= Harvard Crimson men's ice hockey statistical leaders =

The Harvard Crimson men's ice hockey statistical leaders are individual statistical leaders of the Harvard Crimson men's ice hockey program in various categories, including goals, assists, points, and saves. Within those areas, the lists identify single-game, single-season, and career leaders. The Crimson represent Harvard University in the NCAA's ECAC Hockey.

Clarkson began competing in intercollegiate ice hockey in 1897. These lists are updated through the end of the 2021–22 season.

== Goals ==
Career
| Rk | Player | Goals | Seasons |
|---|---|---|---|
| 1 | Lane MacDonald | 111 | 1984–85 1985–86 1986–87 1988–89 |
| 2 | Scott Fusco | 107 | 1981–82 1982–83 1984–85 1985–86 |
| 3 | Bob Cleary | 92 | 1955–56 1956–57 1957–58 |
| 4 | C. J. Young | 84 | 1986–87 1987–88 1988–89 1989–90 |
| 5 | Jimmy Vesey | 80 | 2012–13 2013–14 2014–15 2015–16 |
| 6 | Dan DeMichele | 77 | 1968–69 1969–70 1970–71 |
| 7 | Mike Vukonich | 74 | 1987–88 1988–89 1989–90 1990–91 |
| 8 | George Hughes | 66 | 1975–76 1976–77 1977–78 1978–79 |
| | Peter Ciavaglia | 66 | 1987–88 1988–89 1989–90 1990–91 |
| 10 | Bob McManama | 64 | 1969–70 1970–71 1971–72 1972–73 |
| | Dave Hynes | 64 | 1969–70 1970–71 1971–72 1972–73 |
| | Tim Smith | 64 | 1982–83 1983–84 1984–85 1985–86 |
| | Dominic Moore | 64 | 1999–2000 2000–01 2001–02 2002–03 |

Season
| Rk | Player | Goals | Season |
|---|---|---|---|
| 1 | Bill Cleary | 42 | 1954–55 |
| 2 | Lane MacDonald | 37 | 1986–87 |
| 3 | Bob Cleary | 36 | 1956–57 |
| 4 | Scott Fusco | 34 | 1984–85 |
| 5 | Dan DeMichele | 33 | 1970–71 |
| | Scott Fusco | 33 | 1982–83 |
| | C. J. Young | 33 | 1988–89 |
| 8 | Bob Cleary | 32 | 1957–58 |
| | Jimmy Vesey | 32 | 2014–15 |
| | Mike Vukonich | 32 | 1990–91 |

Single Game
| Rk | Player | Goals | Season | Opponent |
|---|---|---|---|---|
| 1 | Ian Baldwin | 6 | 1932–33 | Brown |
| | Amory Hubbard | 6 | 1950–51 | Williams |
| | Bill Cleary | 6 | 1954–55 | Providence |

== Assists ==
Career
| Rk | Player | Assists | Seasons |
|---|---|---|---|
| 1 | Scott Fusco | 133 | 1981–82 1982–83 1984–85 1985–86 |
| 2 | Peter Ciavaglia | 128 | 1987–88 1988–89 1989–90 1990–91 |
| 3 | Joe Cavanagh | 127 | 1968–69 1969–70 1970–71 |
| 4 | Lane MacDonald | 114 | 1984–85 1985–86 1986–87 1988–89 |
| 5 | Bob Cleary | 108 | 1955–56 1956–57 1957–58 |
| 6 | Mark Benning | 102 | 1984–85 1985–86 1986–87 |
| 7 | Allen Bourbeau | 96 | 1985–86 1986–87 1988–89 |
| 8 | George Hughes | 95 | 1975–76 1976–77 1977–78 1978–79 |
| | Adam Fox | 95 | 2016–17 2017–18 2018–19 |
| 10 | Ted Donato | 94 | 1987–88 1988–89 1989–90 1990–91 |

Season
| Rk | Player | Assists | Season |
|---|---|---|---|
| 1 | Joe Cavanagh | 50 | 1970–71 |
| 2 | Peter Ciavaglia | 48 | 1988–89 |
| 3 | Bill Cleary | 47 | 1954–55 |
| | Scott Fusco | 47 | 1984–85 |
| 5 | Scott Fusco | 44 | 1985–86 |
| 6 | Bob Cleary | 43 | 1957–58 |
| | Allen Bourbeau | 43 | 1988–89 |
| 8 | Ted Drury | 41 | 1992–93 |
| 9 | Joe Cavanagh | 39 | 1969–70 |
| | Peter Ciavaglia | 39 | 1990–91 |
| | Adam Fox | 39 | 2018–19 |

Single Game
| Rk | Player | Assists | Season | Opponent |
|---|---|---|---|---|
| 1 | Bill Cleary | 8 | 1954–55 | Dartmouth |
| 2 | George McManama | 7 | 1969–70 | Boston College |
| 3 | Sid Greeley | 6 | 1946–47 | Williams |
| | David Key | 6 | 1946–47 | Williams |
| | Bob Cleary | 6 | 1957–58 | Tufts |
| | George McManama | 6 | 1967–68 | Penn |
| 7 | Albert Everts | 5 | 1942–43 | Boston University |
| | Lane MacDonald | 5 | 1984–85 | Vermont |
| | Scott Fusco | 5 | 1985–86 | RPI |
| | Tim Smith | 5 | 1985–86 | Brown |
| | Tim Pettit | 5 | 2003–04 | Princeton |
| | Henry Thrun | 5 | 2021–22 | Bentley |

== Points ==
Career
| Rk | Player | Points | Seasons |
|---|---|---|---|
| 1 | Scott Fusco | 240 | 1981–82 1982–83 1984–85 1985–86 |
| 2 | Lane MacDonald | 225 | 1984–85 1985–86 1986–87 1988–89 |
| 3 | Bob Cleary | 199 | 1955–56 1956–57 1957–58 |
| 4 | Peter Ciavaglia | 194 | 1987–88 1988–89 1989–90 1990–91 |
| 5 | Joe Cavanagh | 187 | 1968–69 1969–70 1970–71 |
| 6 | C. J. Young | 162 | 1986–87 1987–88 1988–89 1989–90 |
| 7 | George Hughes | 161 | 1975–76 1976–77 1977–78 1978–79 |
| 8 | Allen Bourbeau | 155 | 1985–86 1986–87 1988–89 |
| 9 | Bob McManama | 151 | 1969–70 1970–71 1971–72 1972–73 |
| 10 | Mike Vukonich | 148 | 1987–88 1988–89 1989–90 1990–91 |

Season
| Rk | Player | Points | Season |
|---|---|---|---|
| 1 | Bill Cleary | 89 | 1954–55 |
| 2 | Scott Fusco | 81 | 1984–85 |
| 3 | Bob Cleary | 76 | 1957–58 |
| 4 | Bob Cleary | 73 | 1956–57 |
| 5 | Joe Cavanagh | 72 | 1970–71 |
| 6 | Scott Fusco | 68 | 1985–86 |
| 7 | Lane MacDonald | 67 | 1986–87 |
| 8 | Peter Ciavaglia | 63 | 1988–89 |
| | Peter Ciavaglia | 63 | 1990–91 |
| | Ted Drury | 63 | 1992–93 |

Single Game
| Rk | Player | Points | Season | Opponent |
|---|---|---|---|---|
| 1 | Bob Cleary | 10 | 1957–58 | Tufts |
| 2 | David Key | 9 | 1946–47 | Williams |
| | Bill Cleary | 9 | 1954–55 | Dartmouth |
| 4 | Sid Greeley | 8 | 1946–47 | Williams |
| | Bill Cleary | 8 | 1954–55 | Providence |
| | George McManama | 8 | 1967–68 | Penn |

== Saves ==
Career
| Rk | Player | Saves | Seasons |
|---|---|---|---|
| 1 | Dov Grumet-Morris | 3,801 | 2001–02 2002–03 2003–04 2004–05 |
| 2 | Grant Blair | 2,976 | 1982–83 1983–84 1984–85 1985–86 |
| 3 | J.R. Prestifilippo | 2,661 | 1996–97 1997–98 1998–99 1999–00 |
| 4 | Kyle Richter | 2,343 | 2006–07 2007–08 2009–10 2010–11 |
| 5 | Merrick Madsen | 2,276 | 2014–15 2015–16 2016–17 2017–18 |
| 6 | Wade Lau | 2,160 | 1978–79 1979–80 1980–81 1981–82 |
| 7 | Tripp Tracy | 2,121 | 1992–93 1993–94 1994–95 1995–96 |
| 8 | Steve Michalek | 2,091 | 2011–12 2013–14 2014–15 |
| 9 | Mitchell Gibson | 2,011 | 2019–20 2021–22 2022–23 |
| 10 | Bruce Durno | 1,921 | 1968–69 1969–70 1970–71 |

Season
| Rk | Player | Saves | Season |
|---|---|---|---|
| 1 | Steve Michalek | 1,029 | 2014–15 |
| 2 | Oliver Jonas | 1,021 | 2000–01 |
| 3 | Ben Charette | 927 | 2025–26 |
| 4 | Dov Grumet-Morris | 923 | 2002–03 |
| 5 | Kyle Richter | 884 | 2007–08 |
| 6 | Raphael Girard | 874 | 2012–13 |
| 7 | Merrick Madsen | 854 | 2016–17 |
| 8 | Dov Grumet-Morris | 847 | 2002–03 |
| 9 | J.R. Prestifilippo | 844 | 1996–97 |
| 10 | Dov Grumet-Morris | 814 | 2003–04 |

Single Game
| Rk | Player | Saves | Season | Opponent |
|---|---|---|---|---|
| 1 | Steve Michalek | 63 | 2014–15 | Boston University |
| 2 | Grant Blair | 60 | 1984–85 | Boston College |
| 3 | Raphael Girard | 52 | 2013–14 | Yale |
| 4 | Bill Fitzsimmons | 48 | 1964–65 | Boston College |
| | Grant Blair | 48 | 1983–84 | RPI |
| | Raphael Girard | 48 | 2011–12 | Yale |
| | Merrick Madsen | 48 | 2017–18 | Minnesota |
