= 1988–89 Harvard Crimson men's ice hockey season =

College ice hockey season

National champion Beanpot, champion ECAC Hockey, champion NCAA tournament, champion
- Conference: 1st ECAC Hockey
- Home ice: Bright-Landry Hockey Center

Record
- Overall: 31–3–0
- Conference: 20–2–0
- Home: 16–0–0
- Road: 10–2–0
- Neutral: 5–1–0

Coaches and captains
- Head coach: Bill Cleary
- Assistant coaches: Ronn Tomassoni
- Captain: Lane MacDonald

The 1988–89 Harvard Crimson men's ice hockey team represented the Harvard University in college ice hockey. In its 18th year under head coach Bill Cleary the team compiled a 31–3–0 record and reached the NCAA tournament for the fourteenth time. The Crimson defeated Minnesota 4–3 in overtime to win the championship game at the St. Paul Civic Center in Saint Paul, Minnesota.

== Season ==
After spending the previous year playing for the US National Team at the 1988 Winter Olympics, Lane MacDonald and Allen Bourbeau returned to Harvard and led a very experienced team that was looking to being the Crimson its first national championship. MacDonald was named team captain and placed on the top line along with Bourbeau and C. J. Young. Over the course of the season Harvard was led by its upper-classmen, with nearly two thirds of the game-to-game roster coming from the veterans. However, the Crimson got major contributions from underclassmen as well. Sophomores Peter Ciavaglia and Ted Donato earned their place on the second line with the former leading the team in scoring. In net Bill Cleary decided to go with a goaltending tandem with the two freshmen Allain Roy and Chuckie Hughes alternating starts.

=== Fast start ===
The Crimson began the year with five wins against different conference opponents, though none were particularly strong squads. The first real test for Harvard came against Hockey East powerhouse Boston College where the two Boston-area rivals battled into overtime where the ivy-leaguers took the game. In the three succeeding games Harvard absolutely pounded their ECAC opponents, scoring 27 goals and routing the competition. Harvard ended 1988 with a pair of games against New Hampshire teams. After an overtime win over UNH the Crimson smashed long-time rival Dartmouth 10–0, Harvard's only shutout of the season.

=== Number one ===
Harvard began the second half of its season in early January and looked to have lost a bit of a step during their three-week break; they continued to win games but their massive goal differentials had vanished. Just when it looked like they were vulnerable, however, the Crimson soundly beat previously-undefeated St. Lawrence and claimed the #1 ranking. The 15–0 Crimson were off to their best start since the depression but couldn't build on their lead for another two weeks. When they finally returned to the ice at the end of the month their offense was nowhere to be found against their arch-rival Yale and Harvard suffered its first loss of the season. The Crimson recovered for the next two games, winning easily against two of the conference's worst teams, before heading to the Boston Garden for the start of the Beanpot.

=== Beanpot champion ===
Despite Harvard's success throughout the 1980s the program hadn't won a Beanpot semifinal since 1981 and they wouldn't have an easy task in the first game as they faced Boston College who were looking for revenge after the earlier loss. Once more the squads fought a close game but Harvard was able to come out as the victor once more, setting up a championship showdown against Boston University a week later. In the meantime Harvard played a pair of road games and suffered their second loss of the season, losing in overtime to 3rd-place Colgate. The Beanpot championship came two days after the loss and Harvard's forwards ran roughshod over the Terriers, scoring nine times to win the match and give the program its ninth Beanpot title.

Harvard faced a bit of a gauntlet in the final two weeks of the regular season, going up against two of the top teams in the conference, but Harvard was able to sweep both weekends and cement its 4th-consecutive ECAC title.

=== ECAC tournament ===
Harvard began the conference tournament by hosting Rensselaer in the best-of-three quarterfinals and won two games handily. The Crimson headed back to Boston Garden for the championship rounds and found themselves in a touch match against the upstart Vermont Catamounts. They fought to a 2–2 draw after regulation and when the sixth-seed team were the ones to find the back of the net Harvard headed to its third consolation game of in four years. While they won the match against Cornell, Harvard's loss in the semifinal gave the top eastern seed to Maine despite the Crimson's 27–3 record.

=== NCAA tournament ===
The slightly lowering of their ranking still gave Harvard a first-round bye in the national tournament, allowing the Crimson to wait at home for their opponent. In late March Harvard played their final home games of the season against defending national champion Lake Superior State and the difference between the two could not have been greater. While Harvard was a fast-skating finesse team, the Lakers were a hard-nosed checking group that relied on their All-American goalie Bruce Hoffort to bail them out on the penalty kill. Harvard's goaltending tandem were able to keep LSSU from scoring much in the two games, allowing the Crimson to win both games and advance to their fourth Frozen Four of the decade.

In the semifinal Harvard faced the team that had stopped them from winning the 1986 championship in Michigan State. The senior class for MSU remembered the win over Harvard and leading-scorer Bobby Reynolds remarked:

"Thank God we're not playing Minnesota."

The relief over facing the Ivy-leaguers was soon erased when Harvard scored twice in the first while Allain Roy stood on his head to make a spectacular save on Reynolds' wrap-around chance. In the end it was the boys from the east who skated away with the victory in front of a mostly-MSU cheering 15,000.

==== Title Game ====
The championship game pitted two teams who had been desperately trying to win the title over the previous decade but came up empty each year. While Harvard wore their home whites it was Minnesota who had a sellout crowd cheering for them in their backyard of Saint Paul. Just prior to the game Lane MacDonald received the Hobey Baker Award, giving both teams a national player of the year (Robb Stauber had won the award in 1988). Both teams were anxious to win the championship and came out flying at the start of the game. Minnesota got on the board first with a fairly soft goal from the stick of Jon Anderson. In Harvard's zeal to tie up the game they took three consecutive penalties in the first period but the penalty kill, which had been good all season, stood strong and prevented Minnesota from extending its lead.

In the second it was Minnesota's turn in the box and the Gophers received three straight minors to start the middle frame. In the second power play for Harvard, Ted Donato fired a shot from the point and the puck sailed past Stauber's glove to tie the score. Four minutes later, just after the Gophers killed off the third penalty, Lane MacDonald managed to get behind Minnesota's defensemen and cut across the front of the net before beating a sprawled Stauber to give Harvard its first lead. Three and a half minutes later Minnesota finally broke through on the power play and the two teams skated into intermission tied at 2.

Minnesota had the balance of power in the third but it was Donato who found the back of the net first, giving Harvard the lead with just over 7 minutes to play. The Gophers fought furiously to tie the score and managed to do just that on their third power play of the period. In overtime Minnesota nearly won the game when a shot from Randy Skarda beat Chuckie Hughes' blocker but it hit the post square and bounced straight back. A few minutes later Harvard won a faceoff in Minnesota's end and Brian McCormack shot a puck from the point. It rebounded off of Stauber and, while Peter Ciavaglia was being tackled by Skarda, Ed Krayer picked up the puck, skated a few feet towards the corner and backhanded a puck that eluded Stauber. The overtime goal silenced the partisan crowd while the cheers from the Harvard squad echoed throughout the building.

=== Awards and honors ===
Ted Donato's two goals in the final games helped him win tournament MOP honors, and he was joined on the All-Tournament team by Kevin Sneddon, Lane MacDonald and Allain Roy. MacDonald's Hobey Baker award was the third for Harvard in a seven-year span and he was the only member of the team to make the AHCA All-American East First Team though linemate C. J. Young made the Second Team. MacDonald was also ECAC Player of the Year and an All-ECAC First Team member. Young, Allen Bourbeau and Peter Ciavaglia made second-team all-conference. As they had been equally critical to the team's success all season, it was fitting that Allain Roy and Chuckie Hughes shared the goaltending spot on the All-ECAC Rookie Team.

Head Coach Bill Cleary remained behind the bench for one more season before becoming the Athletic Director.

== Standings ==
1988–89 ECAC Hockey standings
	Conference							Overall					
	GP	W	L	T	PTS	GF	GA	GP	W	L	T	GF	GA
Harvard†	22	20	2	0	40	130	49	34	31	3	0	191	89
St. Lawrence*	22	18	4	0	36	99	56	36	29	7	0	169	95
Colgate	22	15	6	1	31	108	82	31	19	10	2	161	118
Clarkson	22	13	7	2	28	104	87	32	16	13	3	135	129
Cornell	22	13	9	0	26	76	74	30	16	13	1	113	100
Vermont	22	13	9	0	26	108	73	34	20	13	1	158	116
Yale	22	10	12	0	20	72	84	31	11	19	1	99	137
Rensselaer	22	8	12	2	18	74	82	32	12	17	3	118	123
Dartmouth	22	7	14	1	15	70	96	26	8	17	1	82	113
Army	22	6	15	1	13	62	108	30	13	16	1	93	125
Princeton	22	4	17	1	9	73	113	26	6	19	1	97	133
Brown	22	1	21	0	2	51	132	26	1	25	0	58	155
Championship: St. Lawrence † indicates conference regular season champion * indicates conference tournament champion (Whitelaw Cup)

== Schedule ==
Date	Opponent^{#}	Rank^{#}	Site	Result	Record
Regular season
November 11	vs. Yale		Bright-Landry Hockey Center • Boston, Massachusetts	W 6–3	1–0 (1–0)
November 12	vs. Brown		Bright-Landry Hockey Center • Boston, Massachusetts	W 3–2	2–0 (2–0)
November 18	vs. Army		Tate Rink • West Point, New York	W 6–1	3–0 (3–0)
November 19	at Princeton		Hobey Baker Memorial Rink • Princeton, New Jersey	W 9–5	4–0 (4–0)
November 22	at Dartmouth		Thompson Arena • Hanover, New Hampshire	W 4–2	5–0 (5–0)
November 25	vs. Boston College*		Bright-Landry Hockey Center • Boston, Massachusetts	W 4–3 ^{OT}	6–0 (5–0)
November 28	at Brown		Meehan Auditorium • Providence, Rhode Island	W 10–1	7–0 (6–0)
December 2	vs. Colgate		Bright-Landry Hockey Center • Boston, Massachusetts	W 8–2	8–0 (7–0)
December 4	vs. Cornell		Bright-Landry Hockey Center • Boston, Massachusetts	W 9–1	9–0 (8–0)
December 10	at New Hampshire*		Snively Arena • Durham, New Hampshire	W 4–3 ^{OT}	10–0 (8–0)
December 12	vs. Dartmouth		Bright-Landry Hockey Center • Boston, Massachusetts	W 10–0	11–0 (9–0)
January 6	vs. Rensselaer		Bright-Landry Hockey Center • Boston, Massachusetts	W 4–1	12–0 (10–0)
January 7	vs. Vermont		Bright-Landry Hockey Center • Boston, Massachusetts	W 3–2	13–0 (11–0)
January 13	at Clarkson		Walker Arena • Potsdam, New York	W 5–2	14–0 (12–0)
January 14	at St. Lawrence		Appleton Arena • Canton, New York	W 5–1	15–0 (13–0)
January 31	at Yale		Ingalls Rink • New Haven, Connecticut	L 1–3	15–1 (13–1)
February 3	vs. Princeton		Bright-Landry Hockey Center • Boston, Massachusetts	W 7–2	16–1 (14–1)
February 4	vs. Army		Bright-Landry Hockey Center • Boston, Massachusetts	W 11–1	17–1 (15–1)
Beanpot
February 6	vs. Boston College*		Boston Garden • Boston, Massachusetts (Beanpot Semifinal)	W 5–4	18–1 (15–1)
February 10	at Cornell		Lynah Rink • Ithaca, New York	W 4–2	19–1 (16–1)
February 11	at Colgate		Starr Rink • Hamilton, New York	L 5–6 ^{OT}	19–2 (16–2)
February 13	vs. Boston University*		Boston Garden • Boston, Massachusetts (Beanpot championship)	W 9–6	20–2 (16–2)
February 17	at Vermont		Gutterson Fieldhouse • Burlington, Vermont	W 5–3	21–2 (17–2)
February 18	at Rensselaer		Houston Field House • Troy, New York	W 4–3 ^{OT}	22–2 (18–2)
February 24	vs. St. Lawrence		Bright-Landry Hockey Center • Boston, Massachusetts	W 4–2	23–2 (19–2)
February 25	vs. Clarkson		Bright-Landry Hockey Center • Boston, Massachusetts	W 7–5	24–2 (20–2)
ECAC tournament
March 3	vs. Rensselaer*		Bright-Landry Hockey Center • Boston, Massachusetts (ECAC Quarterfinal game 1)	W 7–3	25–2 (20–2)
March 4	vs. Rensselaer*		Bright-Landry Hockey Center • Boston, Massachusetts (ECAC Quarterfinal game 2)	W 5–4	26–2 (20–2)
Harvard Won Series 2-0
March 10	vs. Vermont*		Boston Garden • Boston, Massachusetts (ECAC Semifinal)	L 2–3 ^{OT}	26–3 (20–2)
March 11	vs. Cornell*		Boston Garden • Boston, Massachusetts (ECAC Consolation Game)	W 6–3	27–3 (20–2)
NCAA tournament
March 24	vs. Lake Superior State*		Bright-Landry Hockey Center • Boston, Massachusetts (National Quarterfinal game 1)	W 4–2	28–3 (20–2)
March 25	vs. Lake Superior State*		Bright-Landry Hockey Center • Boston, Massachusetts (National Quarterfinal game 2)	W 5–2	29–3 (20–2)
Harvard Won Series 2-0
March 30	vs. Michigan State*		St. Paul Civic Center • Saint Paul, Minnesota (National Semifinal)	W 6–3	30–3 (20–2)
April 1	vs. Minnesota*		St. Paul Civic Center • Saint Paul, Minnesota (National championship)	W 4–3 ^{OT}	31–3 (20–2)
*Non-conference game. ^{#}Rankings from USCHO.com Poll. Source:

== Roster and scoring statistics ==
No.	Name	Year	Position	Hometown	S/P/C	Games	Goals	Assists	Pts	PIM
17	Peter Ciavaglia	Sophomore	C	Albany, NY	(New York (state))	34	15	48	63	4
19	Lane MacDonald	Senior	LW	Tulsa, OK	(Oklahoma)	32	31	29	60	42
14	C. J. Young	Junior	RW	Waban, MA	(Massachusetts)	34	33	22	55	24
24	Allen Bourbeau	Junior	C	Worcester, MA	(Massachusetts)	33	11	43	54	48
6	Ted Donato	Sophomore	LW	Boston, MA	(Massachusetts)	34	14	37	51	30
27	John Weisbrod	Senior	C	Syosset, NY	(New York (state))	31	22	13	35	61
11	Ed Krayer	Junior	LW	Acton, MA	(Massachusetts)	34	12	14	26	4
26	John Murphy	Junior	C	Toronto, ON	(Ontario)	33	9	13	22	12
15	Nick Carone	Senior	D	Cheektowaga, NY	(New York (state))	33	8	14	22	36
25	Tod Hartje	Junior	C	Anoka, MN	(Minnesota)	33	4	17	21	40
29	Mike Vukonich	Sophomore	C	Duluth, MN	(Minnesota)	27	11	8	19	12
8	Edmond Presz	Senior	RW	Wilbraham, MA	(Massachusetts)	34	9	7	16	28
5	Kevan Melrose	Sophomore	D	Red Deer, AB	(Alberta)	32	2	13	15	126
9	Paul Howley	Senior	F	Milton, MA	(Massachusetts)	34	6	6	12	28
7	Joshua Caplan	Senior	D	Wellesley, MA	(Massachusetts)	33	0	11	11	34
10	Craig Taucher	Senior	F	Troy, MI	(Michigan)	13	2	7	9	2
23	Scott McCormack	Junior	D	Lake Forest, IL	(Illinois)	19	1	8	9	10
22	Brian McCormack	Freshman	D	Bloomington, MN	(Minnesota)	31	0	8	8	16
21	Kevin Sneddon	Freshman	D	St. Catharines, ON	(Ontario)	32	0	6	6	22
3	Brian Popiel	Sophomore	D	Thunder Bay, ON	(Ontario)	15	0	3	3	2
18	Scott Farden	Senior	D	Virginia, MN	(Minnesota)	4	0	2	2	2
2	Rich DeFreitas	Freshman	D	Manchester, NH	(New Hampshire)	5	0	2	2	6
30	Chuckie Hughes	Freshman	G	Quincy, MA	(Massachusetts)	17	0	2	2	2
16	Tim Burke	Freshman	F	Wellesley, MA	(Massachusetts)	2	1	0	1	0
31	Allain Roy	Freshman	G	Campbellton, NB	(New Brunswick)	16	0	1	1	2
1	Mike Francis	Sophomore	G	Braintree, MA	(Massachusetts)	3	0	0	0	0
10	Aron Allen	Sophomore	F	New Ulm, MN	(Minnesota)	0	-	-	-	-
20	Jim Coady	Freshman	F	Needham, MA	(Massachusetts)	0	-	-	-	-
4	Greg Hess	Freshman	D	Toronto, ON	(Ontario)	0	-	-	-	-
27	Craig Miskovich	Freshman	F	Coleraine, MN	(Minnesota)	0	-	-	-	-
Total							191	334	525	593

== Goaltending statistics ==
No.	Name	Games	Minutes	Wins	Losses	Ties	Goals Against	Saves	Shut Outs	SV %	GAA
31	Allain Roy	16								.912	2.46
30	Chuckie Hughes	17		15	1	0				.906	2.79
1	Mike Francis	3									
Total		38		31	3	0					

== 1989 championship game ==
=== (W2) Minnesota vs. (E2) Harvard ===
April 1	Minnesota	3 – 4	OT	Harvard	St. Paul Civic Center

Scoring summary
Period	Team	Goal	Assist(s)	Time	Score
1st	MIN	Jon Anderson	B. Hankinson and Olimb	6:24	1–0 MIN
2nd	HAR	Ted Donato – PP	MacDonald and Bourbeau	26:30	1–1
2nd	HAR	Lane MacDonald	Young	30:29	2–1 HAR
2nd	MIN	Jason Miller – PP	Pitlick and Chorske	33:01	2–2
3rd	HAR	Ted Donato	Sneddon and Vukonich	52:53	3–2 HAR
3rd	MIN	Peter Hankinson – PP	Pederson and Skarda	56:34	3–3
1st Overtime	HAR	Ed Krayer – GW	B. McCormack and Ciavaglia	64:15	4–3 HAR
Penalty summary
Period	Team	Player	Penalty	Time	PIM
1st	HAR	Ed Krayer	Cross-Checking	13:21	2:00
1st	HAR	Nick Carone	High–Sticking	15:33	2:00
1st	HAR	Kevan Melrose	Holding	17:39	2:00
2nd	MIN	Lance Pitlick	Elbowing	20:56	2:00
2nd	MIN	Todd Richards	Holding	25:57	2:00
2nd	MIN	Tom Chorske	Hooking	27:22	2:00
2nd	HAR	Kevin Sneddon	Hooking	31:08	2:00
2nd	MIN	Tom Chorske	Interference	37:10	2:00
2nd	HAR	Josh Caplan	Elbowing	38:44	2:00
3rd	MIN	Tom Pederson	Roughing	40:46	2:00
3rd	HAR	Nick Carone	Holding	47:29	2:00
3rd	HAR	Allen Bourbeau	High–Sticking	49:59	2:00
3rd	HAR	John Weisbrod	Cross–Checking	54:46	2:00

Shots by period
Team	1	2	3	OT	T
Harvard	11	9	6	2	28
Minnesota	10	10	14	1	35

Goaltenders
Team	Name	Saves	Goals against	Time on ice
HAR	Chuckie Hughes	32	3	64:15
MIN	Robb Stauber	24	4	64:15

== Players drafted into the NHL ==
=== 1989 NHL entry draft ===
= NHL All-Star team	= NHL All-Star	= NHL All-Star and NHL All-Star team	= Did not play in the NHL

Round	Pick	Player	NHL team
2	42	Ted Drury†	Calgary Flames
4	69	Allain Roy	Winnipeg Jets
12	249	Kevin Sneddon	Los Angeles Kings

† incoming freshman

=== 1989 NHL Supplemental Draft ===
Pick	Player	NHL team
5	C. J. Young	New Jersey Devils

== See also ==
- 1989 NCAA Division I Men's Ice Hockey Tournament
- List of NCAA Division I Men's Ice Hockey Tournament champions
