= 1989 NCAA Division I men's ice hockey tournament =

- Teams: 12
- Finals site: St. Paul Civic Center, Saint Paul, Minnesota
- Champions: Harvard Crimson (1st title)
- Runner-up: Minnesota Golden Gophers (9th title game)
- Semifinalists: Michigan State Spartans (7th Frozen Four); Maine Black Bears (2nd Frozen Four)
- Winning coach: Bill Cleary (1st title)
- MOP: Ted Donato (Harvard)
- Attendance: 61,418

The 1989 NCAA Division I Men's Ice Hockey Tournament was the culmination of the 1988–89 NCAA Division I men's ice hockey season, the 42nd such tournament in NCAA history. It was held between March 17 and April 1, 1989, and concluded with Harvard defeating Minnesota 4-3 in overtime. All First Round and Quarterfinals matchups were held at home team venues with the 'Frozen Four' games being played at the St. Paul Civic Center in Saint Paul, Minnesota.

This was the last tournament in which the semifinal games were played on separate days and the last tournament to feature a consolation game.

== Qualifying teams ==
The NCAA permitted 12 teams to qualify for the tournament and divided its qualifiers into two regions (East and West). Each of the tournament champions from the four Division I conferences (CCHA, ECAC, Hockey East and WCHA) received automatic invitations into the tournament with At-large bids making up the remaining 8 teams. The NCAA permitted one Independent team to participate in the tournament and because the previous year the independent qualifier was placed in the West pool the two eastern conferences (ECAC and Hockey East) would split only three open spots as opposed to the West's four open spots. The top four remaining western teams and the top three remaining eastern teams received invitations and were seeded with the automatic qualifiers according to their ranking.

| East | | | | | | | West | | | | | | |
| Seed | School | Conference | Record | Berth type | Appearance | Last bid | Seed | School | Conference | Record | Berth type | Appearance | Last bid |
|---|---|---|---|---|---|---|---|---|---|---|---|---|---|
| 1 | Maine | Hockey East | 29–11–0 | Tournament champion | 3rd | 1988 | 1 | Michigan State | CCHA | 34–7–1 | Tournament champion | 11th | 1988 |
| 2 | Harvard | ECAC Hockey | 27–3–0 | At-large bid | 14th | 1988 | 2 | Minnesota | WCHA | 31–10–3 | At-large bid | 16th | 1988 |
| 3 | St. Lawrence | ECAC Hockey | 29–5–0 | Tournament champion | 11th | 1988 | 3 | Lake Superior State | CCHA | 27–9–6 | At-large bid | 3rd | 1988 |
| 4 | Boston College | Hockey East | 22–9–4 | At-large bid | 16th | 1987 | 4 | Northern Michigan | WCHA | 25–15–2 | Tournament champion | 3rd | 1981 |
| 5 | Providence | Hockey East | 19–15–2 | At-large bid | 6th | 1985 | 5 | Bowling Green | CCHA | 26–16–3 | At-large bid | 8th | 1988 |
| 6 | St. Cloud State | Independent | 19–14–2 | At-large bid | 1st | Never | 6 | Wisconsin | WCHA | 23–14–5 | At-large bid | 10th | 1988 |

== Format ==
The tournament featured four rounds of play. The three odd-number ranked teams from one region were placed into a bracket with the three even-number ranked teams of the other region. The teams were then seeded according to their ranking with the top two teams in each bracket receiving byes into the quarterfinals. In the first round the third and sixth seeds and the fourth and fifth seeds played best-of-three series to determine which school advanced to the Quarterfinals with the winners of the 4 vs. 5 series playing the first seed and the winner of the 3 vs. 6 series playing the second seed. In the Quarterfinals the matches were best-of-three series once more with the victors advancing to the National Semifinals. Beginning with the Semifinals all games were played at the St. Paul Civic Center and all series became Single-game eliminations. The winning teams in the semifinals advanced to the National Championship Game.

== Tournament Bracket ==
First Round; March 17–19
W4 | Northern Michigan | 9 | 2 | 0
E5 | Providence | 5 | 4 | 2
E3 | St. Lawrence | 1 | 2 | –
W6 | Wisconsin | 3 | 4 | –
E4 | Boston College | 8 | 4 | –
W5 | Bowling Green | 5 | 2 | –
W3 | Lake Superior State | 6 | 4 | –
E6 | St. Cloud State | 3 | 2 | –

Quarterfinals; March 24–26
E1 | Maine | 6 | 3 | 4**
E5 | Providence | 8 | 2 | 3
W2 | Minnesota | 4 | 4 | –
W6 | Wisconsin | 2 | 2 | –
W1 | Michigan State | 3 | 7 | 5*
E4 | Boston College | 6 | 2 | 4
E2 | Harvard | 4 | 5 | –
W3 | Lake Superior State | 2 | 2 | –

Frozen Four; March 30–31
E1 | Maine | 4
W2 | Minnesota | 7
W1 | Michigan State | 3
E2 | Harvard | 6

National Championship; April 1
W2 | Minnesota | 3
E2 | Harvard | 4*
Third Place Game
E1 | Maine | 4
W1 | Michigan State | 7

Note: * denotes overtime period(s)

=== First round ===
==== (E3) St. Lawrence vs. (W6) Wisconsin ====
| March 17 | St. Lawrence | 1 – 3 | Wisconsin | Appleton Arena | Recap |
| No scoring | | First period | 01:35 - Gary Shuchuk (Tancill, Sagissor); 17:07 - GW - John Byce (Hill Rohlik); 19:49 - Paul Stanton (Shuchuk, Byce) |
| (Consorte, Laperriere) Martyn Ball - 11:29 | | Second period | No scoring |
| No scoring | | Third period | No scoring |
| (23 saves / 26 shots) Paul Cohen | | Goalie stats | Curtis Joseph (32 saves / 33 shots) |

| March 18 | St. Lawrence | 2 – 4 | Wisconsin | Appleton Arena | Recap |
| (Day, Murray) Dan Laperriere - PP - 10:31 | | First period | No scoring |
| No scoring | | Second period | 03:01 - PP - Rob Andringa (Tancill, Rohlik) |
| (Consorte, Witherell) Rob White - 04:29 | | Third period | 01:14 - Steve Rohlik (Hill, MacDonald); 06:12 - GW - Chris Tancill (Sagissor, Shuchuk); 19:21 - EN - Gary Shuchuk (Rohlik) |
| (32 saves / 35 shots) Les Kuntar (0 saves / 0 shots) Paul Cohen | | Goalie stats | Curtis Joseph (29 saves / 31 shots) |

| Wisconsin won series 2–0 |

==== (E4) Boston College vs. (W5) Bowling Green ====
| March 17 | Boston College | 8 – 5 | Bowling Green | Conte Forum | Recap |
| (Buckley, Sweeney) Steve Heinze - 00:31 (O'Neill) Shawn Kennedy - 11:46 (Heinze, Sweeney) Marty McInnis - 19:43 | | First period | 01:43 - Jim Solly (Holmes, Jiranek) |
| (Sweeney) David Emma - PP - 01:26 (unassisted) Tim Sweeney - SH - 05:49 (Brown, Emma) Steve Heinze - GW - 09:34 (McInnis, Pergola) Joe Cleary - PP - 13:24 | | Second period | 02:24 - PP - Joe Quinn (Emerson, Blake); 10:24 - Peter Holmes (Jiranek, Solly) |
| (unassisted) Mark Mullowney - EN - 18:59 | | Third period | 10:45 - PP - Nelson Emerson (Parks, Blake); 18:12 - PP - Rob Blake (Emerson, Parks) |
| (23 saves / 27 shots) David Littman (0 saves / 1 shot) Sandy Galuppo | | Goalie stats | Paul Connell (24 saves / 31 shots); John Burke (11 saves / 11 shots) |

| March 18 | Boston College | 4 – 2 | Bowling Green | Conte Forum | Recap |
| (Sweeney) Marty McInnis - 00:10 | | First period | 02:57 - Peter Holmes (Parks) |
| (Sweeney, Emma) Steve Heinze - PP - 16:04 (Nolan, Kennedy) Jeff O'Neill - GW - 16:42 | | Second period | No scoring |
| (Littman) Tim Sweeney - EN - 19:50 | | Third period | 18:50 - EA - Kevin Dahl (Emerson) |
| (45 saves / 47 shots) David Littman | | Goalie stats | Paul Connell (22 saves / 25 shots) |

| Boston College won series 2–0 |

==== (W3) Lake Superior State vs. (E6) St. Cloud State ====
| March 17 | Lake Superior State | 6 – 3 | St. Cloud State | Norris Center | Recap |
| (Moger, Palumbo) Pete Stauber - 03:22 (Keczmer, Palumbo) Jeff Napierala - PP - 07:25 (Dowd, Keczmer) Anthony Palumbo - PP - 14:22 (Stauber, Palumbo) Mark Astley - GW - 18:27 | | First period | 11:51 - PP - Tim Hanus (Chartier) |
| (Astley, Cernich) Pete Stauber - PP - 02:07 (Palumbo) Rene Chapdelaine - 05:10 | | Second period | 04:04 - PP - Brian Cook (Saterdalen, Wingate) |
| No scoring | | Third period | 15:25 - PP - Jeff Saterdalen (Esau, Hanus) |
| (24 saves / 27 shots) Bruce Hoffort | | Goalie stats | Mike O'Hara (22 saves / 28 shots); Craig Shermoen (20 saves / 20 shots) |

| March 18 | Lake Superior State | 4 – 2 | St. Cloud State | Norris Center | Recap |
| (Breslin, Laprade) Vince Faucher - 02:17 (unassisted) Anthony Palumbo - 06:45 | | First period | 15:13 - PP - Brian Cook (Hanus, Esau) |
| (Palumbo, Keczner) Pete Stauber - GW - 03:22 (Johnston) Jim Dowd - SH - 15:26 | | Second period | 12:34 - Vic Brodt (Eichstadt) |
| No scoring | | Third period | No scoring |
| (16 saves / 18 shots) Bruce Hoffort | | Goalie stats | Craig Shermoen (20 saves / 24 shots) |

| Lake Superior State won series 2–0 |

==== (W4) Northern Michigan vs. (E5) Providence ====
| March 17 | Northern Michigan | 9 – 5 | Providence | Lakeview Arena | Recap |
| (Soukoroff, Werenka) Dallas Drake - PP - 04:09 (Porter, Soukoroff) Troy Jacobsen - 07:22 (Jacobsen, Scott) Phil Berger - 11:16 | | First period | 05:49 - Lyle Wildgoose (Hughes, Aubé); 16:54 - PP - Mario Aubé (Kane, Wildgoose); 17:10 - Lyle Wildgoose (Aubé, Kane) |
| (Olsen, Berger) Dean Antos - PP - 10:37 (Plandowski, Antos) Eric LeMarque - 11:57 (Brown, Goode) Kevin Scott - GW - 13:09 | | Second period | 02:26 - John Ferguson Jr. (Whittemore, Saundercook) |
| (Jacobsen, Berger) Dave Porter - 06:09 (Antos, Werenka) Darryl Plandowski - 07:23 (Antos, Werenka) Eric LeMarque - PP - 13:51 | | Third period | 01:36 - Pat Madigan (unassisted) |
| (24 saves / 29 shots) Bill Pye | | Goalie stats | Mark Romaine (19 saves / 25 shots); Matt Merten (12 saves / 15 shots) |

| March 18 | Northern Michigan | 2 – 4 | Providence | Lakeview Arena | Recap |
| (Brown, Garrow) Kevin Scott - 00:16 (Jacobsen, Berger) Dave Porter - 15:58 | | First period | No scoring |
| No scoring | | Second period | 06:04 - Paul Saundercook (Gaudreau); 12:57 - PP - Rob Gaudreau (Hughes, Wildgoose) |
| No scoring | | Third period | 12:22 - GW - Rob Gaudreau (Bennett, Boback); 15:54 - Shaun Kane (Boback) |
| (29 saves / 33 shots) Bill Pye | | Goalie stats | Mark Romaine (26 saves / 28 shots) |

| March 19 | Northern Michigan | 0 – 2 | Providence | Lakeview Arena | Recap |
| No scoring | | First period | 01:03 - GW - Rick Bennett (Boback, Serowik) |
| No scoring | | Second period | No scoring |
| No scoring | | Third period | 18:41 - Rob Gaudreau (Boback) |
| (22 saves / 24 shots) Bill Pye | | Goalie stats | Mark Romaine (30 saves / 30 shots) |

| Providence won series 2–1 |

=== Quarterfinals ===
==== (E1) Maine vs. (E5) Providence ====
| March 24 | Maine | 6 – 8 | Providence | Alfond Arena | Recap |
| (Lalonde) Dave Capuano - 12:46 (Vitale, Corkum) Bruce Major - PP - 13:08 (Cambio, Capuano) Guy Perron - PP - 17:29 | | First period | 02:21 - Todd Whittemore (Ferguson, Becker); 09:32 - PP - Mike Boback (Aubé, Wildgoose); 19:15 - PP - Shaun Kane (Wildgoose, Serowik) |
| (Major, Corkum) Luke Vitale - 19:15 | | Second period | 04:31 - Lyle Wildgoose (Madigan, Aubé); 05:04 - Rick Bennett (Gaudreau, Boback); 19:41 - SH - Mike Boback (unassisted) |
| (Beers, Corkum) Bruce Major - 05:47 (Cambio, Barkley) Todd Jenkins - 10:27 | | Third period | 13:00 - GW - Mike Boback (unassisted); 13:47 - Rob Gaudreau (Bennett, Boback) |
| (22 saves / 30 shots) Scott King | | Goalie stats | Mark Romaine (18 saves / 24 shots) |

| March 25 | Maine | 3 – 2 | Providence | Alfond Arena | Recap |
| (Thyer) Dave Capuano - 00:38 (Scremin, Thyer) Bob Corkum - PP - 15:35 | | First period | 12:10 - Rob Gaudreau (unassisted) |
| (Pellerin, Perron) Martin Robitaille - PP GW - 18:35 | | Second period | 12:58 - Mario Aubé (Boback) |
| No scoring | | Third period | No scoring |
| (24 saves / 26 shots) Matt DelGuidice | | Goalie stats | Mark Romaine (25 saves / 28 shots) |

| March 26 | Maine | 4 – 3 | 2OT | Providence | Alfond Arena | Recap |
| (Capuano, Thyer) Vince Guidotti - 16:24 | | First period | | 07:52 - Lyle Wildgoose (Madigan, Aubé) |
| No scoring | | Second period | | 17:16 - PP - Mario Aubé (Hughes, Gaudreau); 18:02 - PP - Mario Aubé (Gaudreau) |
| (Capuano, Lalonde) Mario Thyer - 08:35 (Robitaille, DelGuidice) Scott Pellerin - 17:38 | | Third period | | No scoring |
| (Guidotti, Perron) Martin Robitaille - GW - 05:28 | | Second overtime period | | No scoring |
| (28 saves / 31 shots) Matt DelGuidice | | Goalie stats | | Mark Romaine (33 saves / 37 shots) |

| Maine won series 2–1 |

==== (E2) Harvard vs. (W3) Lake Superior State ====
| March 24 | Harvard | 4 – 2 | Lake Superior State | Bright Hockey Center | Recap |
| (Donato) C. J. Young - PP - 05:14 | | First period | No scoring |
| (Krayer, Melrose) John Weisbrod - PP - 15:36 (Melrose, Caplan) Ed Krayer - PP GW - 19:22 | | Second period | No scoring |
| (Donato) Mike Vukonich - 08:12 | | Third period | 05:08 - Pete Stauber (Astley, Cernich); 12:52 - PP - Jeff Napierala (Dowd, Palumbo) |
| (21 saves / 23 shots) Allain Roy | | Goalie stats | Bruce Hoffort (40 saves / 44 shots) |

| March 25 | Harvard | 5 – 2 | Lake Superior State | Bright Hockey Center | Recap |
| (Carone) Pete Ciavaglia - SH - 10:00 | | First period | 10:49 - PP - Dan Keczmer (Dowd, Palumbo) |
| (Donato, Bourbeau) Pete Ciavaglia - PP - 10:40 (Bourbeau, Young) Pete Ciavaglia - PP GW - 13:58 (Ciavaglia, Weisbrod) Ed Krayer - 17:12 | | Second period | 05:49 - Mike deCarle (Chapdelaine) |
| (Young, Hughes) Lane MacDonald - EN - 17:29 | | Third period | No scoring |
| (31 saves / 33 shots) Chuckie Hughes | | Goalie stats | Bruce Hoffort (36 saves / 40 shots) |

| Harvard won series 2–0 |

==== (W1) Michigan State vs. (E4) Boston College ====
| March 24 | Michigan State | 3 – 6 | Boston College | Munn Ice Arena |
| (Reynolds, Murray) Steve Beadle – PP – 19:55 | | First period | 10:41 – PP – Marty McInnis (Franzosa); 12:41 – Steve Scheifele (Franzosa, Buckley) |
| No scoring | | Second period | 01:11 – Shawn Kennedy (O'Neill, Sweeney) |
| (Hamilton, Brind'Amour) Shawn Heaphy – 11:53 (Cole, Reynolds) Brad Hamilton – PP – 19:16 | | Third period | 06:42 – GW – David Emma (Mullowney); 08:09 – Tim Sweeney (Heinze, McInnis); 12:34 – Shawn Kennedy (Braccia) |
| (19 saves / 25 shots) Jason Muzzatti (3 saves / 3 shots) Jamie Stewart | | Goalie stats | David Littman (23 saves / 25 shots); Sandy Galuppo (1 save / 2 shots) |

| March 25 | Michigan State | 7 – 2 | Boston College | Munn Ice Arena |
| (Reynolds) Danton Cole – 17:59 | | First period | No scoring |
| (White, Woolley) Shawn Heaphy – PP – 07:22 (Bartels, Beadle) Mark Hirth – GW – 09:18 (White, Brind'Amour) Shawn Heaphy – 10:34 (Luongo, Norris) Pat Murray – 13:41 | | Second period | 05:07 – PP – Paul Marshall (Franzosa); 10:49 – Steve Heinze (McInnis) |
| (Luongo) Peter White – 12:16 (Murray, Brind'Amour) Kip Miller – 14:29 | | Third period | No scoring |
| (25 saves / 27 shots) Jason Muzzatti | | Goalie stats | David Littman (25 saves / 30 shots); Sandy Gallupo (9 saves / 11 shots) |

| March 26 | Michigan State | 5 – 4 | OT | Boston College | Munn Ice Arena |
| (Brind'Amour, Woolley) Kip Miller – PP – 05:22 | | First period | | 03:35 – SH – David Emma (Heinze, Brown); 12:41 – Steve Scheifele (Franzosa, Buckley) |
| (Brind'Amour) Peter White – 01:49 | | Second period | | 00:34 – Jeff O'Neill (Brown, Mullowney) |
| (Murray, Beadle) Bobby Reynolds – 01:42 (Heaphy) Rod Brind'Amour – 05:23 | | Third period | | 03:57 – PP – Paul Marshall (Emma, Heinze); 04:22 – Joe Cleary (Braccia, Buckley) |
| (Gibson, Russell) Mark Hirth – GW – 05:57 | | First overtime period | | No scoring |
| (27 saves / 31 shots) Jason Muzzatti | | Goalie stats | | David Littman (24 saves / 29 shots) |

| Michigan State won series 2–1 |

==== (W2) Minnesota vs. (W6) Wisconsin ====
| March 24 | Minnesota | 4 – 2 | Wisconsin | Mariucci Arena | Recap |
| (unassisted) Tom Chorske - 04:33 | | First period | No scoring |
| (Olimb, Anderson) Tom Pederson - PP - 01:19 (Miller, Chorske) Grant Bischoff - GW - 10:43 (Miller, Chorske) Todd Richards - PP - 14:51 | | Second period | 05:13 - Steve Rohlik (Hill); 15:01 - John Byce (Osiecki, Kurtz) |
| No scoring | | Third period | No scoring |
| (27 saves / 29 shots) Robb Stauber | | Goalie stats | Curtis Joseph (21 saves / 25 shots) |

| March 25 | Minnesota | 4 – 2 | Wisconsin | Mariucci Arena | Recap |
| (Anderson) Lance Pitlick - 03:47 | | First period | 11:58 - Tom Sagissor (Decker, Tancill) |
| (Chorske) Jason Miller - 14:44 | | Second period | 13:39 - Dennis Snedden (Decker) |
| (Chorske, Bischoff) Jason Miller - GW - 13:12 (Skarda) Dave Snuggerud - EN - 19:32 | | Third period | No scoring |
| (19 saves / 21 shots) Robb Stauber | | Goalie stats | Curtis Joseph (25 saves / 28 shots) |

| Minnesota won series 2–0 |

== Frozen Four ==
=== National Semifinal ===
==== (W1) Michigan State vs. (E2) Harvard ====
| March 30 | Michigan State | 3 – 6 | Harvard | St. Paul Civic Center |
| No scoring | | First period | 03:58 – Peter Ciavaglia (Weisbrod, Krayer); 06:54 – PP – C. J. Young (Donato, Ciavaglia) |
| (Woolley, Miller) Danton Cole – PP – 15:25 | | Second period | 10:24 – PP – Lane MacDonald (Ciavaglia, Donato); 16:01 – GW – Ted Donato (Vukonich); 16:24 – Ed Krayer (Hartje, Caplan) |
| (White, Hamilton) Shawn Heaphy – 06:37 (unassisted) Danton Cole – 14:16 | | Third period | 05:10 – Ed Krayer (Ciavaglia, Weisbrod) |
| (25 saves / 31 shots) Jason Muzzatti | | Goalie stats | Allain Roy (30 saves / 33 shots) |

==== (E1) Maine vs. (W2) Minnesota ====
| March 31 | Maine | 4 – 7 | Minnesota | St. Paul Civic Center |

=== Consolation Game ===
==== (E1) Maine vs. (W1) Michigan State ====
| April 1 | Maine | 4 – 7 | Michigan State | St. Paul Civic Center |
| (Vitale, Scremin) Bob Corkum – 02:08 | | First period | 07:17 – PP – Shawn Heaphy (unassisted); 13:17 – Shawn Heaphy (Brind'Amour) |
| (Barkley, Jenkins) Chris Cambio – 03:06 (Burke, Guidotti) Scott Pellerin – PP – 04:16 | | Second period | 08:26 – Steve Beadle (Norris, Miller); 11:10 – Kerry Russell (Bartels); 12:50 – GW – Danton Cole (Cummins, Reynolds); 13:07 – Rod Brind'Amour (Heaphy, Beadle); 19:49 – PP – Shawn Heaphy (White, Brind'Amour) |
| (Perron, Robitaille) Mario Thyer – PP – 04:09 | | Third period | No scoring |
| (42 saves / 49 shots) Scott King | | Goalie stats | Jason Muzzatti (21 saves / 25 shots) |

=== National Championship ===
==== (W2) Minnesota vs. (E2) Harvard ====
| April 1 | Minnesota | 3 – 4 | OT | Harvard | St. Paul Civic Center |

Scoring summary
| Period | Team | Goal | Assist(s) | Time | Score |
|---|---|---|---|---|---|
| 1st | MIN | Jon Anderson | B. Hankinson and Olimb | 6:24 | 1–0 MIN |
| 2nd | HAR | Ted Donato – PP | MacDonald and Bourbeau | 26:30 | 1–1 |
| 2nd | HAR | Lane MacDonald | Young | 30:29 | 2–1 HAR |
| 2nd | MIN | Jason Miller – PP | Pitlick and Chorske | 33:01 | 2–2 |
| 3rd | HAR | Ted Donato | Sneddon and Vukonich | 52:53 | 3–2 HAR |
| 3rd | MIN | Peter Hankinson – PP | Pederson and Skarda | 56:34 | 3–3 |
| 1st Overtime | HAR | Ed Krayer – GW | B. McCormack and Ciavaglia | 64:15 | 4–3 HAR |
Penalty summary
| Period | Team | Player | Penalty | Time | PIM |
| 1st | HAR | Ed Krayer | Cross-checking | 13:21 | 2:00 |
| 1st | HAR | Nick Carone | High-sticking | 15:33 | 2:00 |
| 1st | HAR | Kevan Melrose | Holding | 17:39 | 2:00 |
| 2nd | MIN | Lance Pitlick | Elbowing | 20:56 | 2:00 |
| 2nd | MIN | Todd Richards | Holding | 25:57 | 2:00 |
| 2nd | MIN | Tom Chorske | Hooking | 27:22 | 2:00 |
| 2nd | HAR | Kevin Sneddon | Hooking | 31:08 | 2:00 |
| 2nd | MIN | Tom Chorske | Interference | 37:10 | 2:00 |
| 2nd | HAR | Josh Caplan | Elbowing | 38:44 | 2:00 |
| 3rd | MIN | Tom Pederson | Roughing | 40:46 | 2:00 |
| 3rd | HAR | Nick Carone | Holding | 47:29 | 2:00 |
| 3rd | HAR | Allen Bourbeau | High-sticking | 49:59 | 2:00 |
| 3rd | HAR | John Weisbrod | Cross-checking | 54:46 | 2:00 |
| 1st Overtime | none | | | | |

Shots by period
| Team | 1 | 2 | 3 | OT | T |
|---|---|---|---|---|---|
| Harvard | 11 | 9 | 6 | 2 | 28 |
| Minnesota | 10 | 10 | 14 | 1 | 35 |

Goaltenders
| Team | Name | Saves | Goals against | Time on ice |
|---|---|---|---|---|
| HAR | Chuckie Hughes | 32 | 3 | 64:15 |
| MIN | Robb Stauber | 24 | 4 | 64:15 |

== All-Tournament Team ==
- G: Allain Roy (Harvard)
- D: Todd Richards (Minnesota)
- D: Kevin Sneddon (Harvard)
- F: Jon Anderson (Minnesota)
- F: Ted Donato* (Harvard)
- F: Lane MacDonald (Harvard)

* Most Outstanding Player(s)
