= Dan DeMichele =

American baseball and ice hockey player

- Outfield/First baseman/Second baseman
- Born: August 19, 1948 (age 77); Cranston, Rhode Island, U.S.
- Bats: Left Throws: Right

Teams
- Sagamore Canalmen (1965–1966); Yarmouth Indians (1967–1968); Harvard (1969–1971); Caldwell Cubs (1971); Quincy Cubs (1972)

Career highlights and awards
- 3x Cape Cod Baseball League All-Star; 1970 Ivy League batting champion
Ice hockey career
- Height: 6 ft 2 in (188 cm)
- Weight: 213 lb (97 kg; 15 st 3 lb)
- Position: Left wing
- Shoots: Right
- Played for: Harvard Crimson; Braintree Hawks

Daniel Frederick DeMichele (born August 19, 1948) is an American athlete who competed for the Harvard Crimson baseball and ice hockey teams. After graduating, he signed a contract with the Chicago Cubs and played two seasons in minor league baseball.

== High school ==
DeMichele attended Cranston High School East, where he was the leading goal scorer for the school's 1964 state championship hockey team, that also included Joe Cavanagh and Curt Bennett. He then attended Vermont Academy.

== College ==
=== Hockey ===
DeMichele attended Harvard College, where he and Cavanagh played on the first line of the freshman hockey team alongside Steve Owen. During their sophomore season, the Cavanagh–DeMichele–Owen line accounted for 67 goals. DeMichele started the 1969–70 season by scoring a hat-trick in the season opener against Dartmouth. He scored a goal in the championship game of the ECAC Christmas Hockey Tournament at the Boston Garden, but a fractured ankle kept him out of action for the next month. On March 7, he scored his second hat trick in a 9–0 victory over Yale. DeMichele scored 33 goals during his senior season, which was the third most in school history behind Bill and Bob Cleary (since passed by Lane MacDonald and Scott Fusco). He scored four goals in Harvard's 8–0 victory over Princeton. He scored a goal in Harvard's 7–4 win against Clarkson in the ECAC Hockey championship game. In the semifinals of the 1971 NCAA University Division men's ice hockey tournament, Harvard was upset by Minnesota 6–5 in overtime.

Following his collegiate career, DeMichele played one season with the Braintree Hawks in the New England Hockey League (NEnHL) scoring 11 goals and registering 6 assists.

== Baseball ==
DeMichele played four seasons (1965–68) in the Cape Cod Baseball League. He was a member of the Sagamore Canalmen team that won the 1965 league championship and led the league in consecutive hits in 1967 (53) and 1968 (43) as a member of the Yarmouth Indians. He is the only player in league history to be elected to the CCBL All-Star game at three different positions. He was drafted by the New York Mets in the 2nd round of the 1967 Major League Baseball draft.

As a junior, DeMichele batted .421 with five home runs and 10 doubles. His batting average was the highest by a Crimson player since 1922. He won the Ivy League batting title by hitting .477 in league competition. He batted .355 as a senior and helped lead the Crimson a Division I title and an appearance in the 1971 College World Series.

DeMichele signed with the Chicago Cubs on June 19, 1971 and was sent to their Pioneer League affiliate, the Caldwell Cubs. In 60 games with the Cubs, DeMichele batted .349 with 4 home runs and 28 RBI. The following season he played 104 games for the Quincy Cubs of the Midwest League, where he had a .304 batting average, 12 home runs, and 65 RBI.

== Honors ==
DeMichele was elected to the Harvard Varsity Club Hall of Fame in 1995 and the Cape Cod Baseball League Hall of Fame in 2012.
