= ECAC Hockey men's tournament =

Collegiate conference ice hockey tournament for ECAC Hockey

- Conference hockey championship
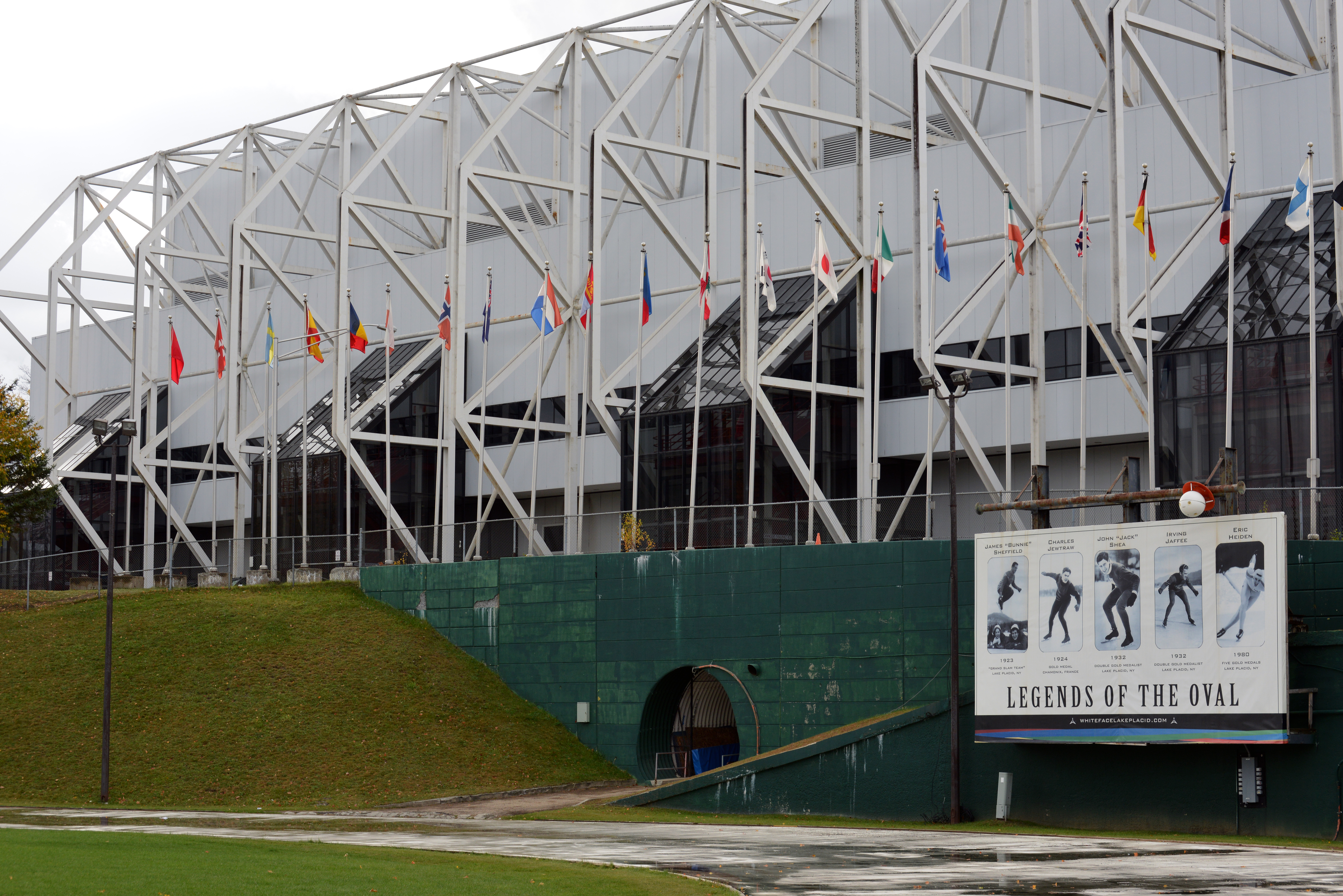
- Herb Brooks Arena in Lake Placid, NY, has hosted the championship game nearly every year since 2014.
- Sport: Ice hockey
- Conference: ECAC Hockey
- Number of teams: 12
- Format: Single-elimination, best two-of-three tournament
- Current stadium: Herb Brooks Arena
- Current location: Lake Placid, New York
- Played: 1962–present
- Last contest: 2026 ECAC Hockey Tournament
- Current champion: Dartmouth (1st title)
- Most championships: Cornell (14)
- Winner trophy: Whitelaw Cup
- TV partner: ESPN+
- Official website: The Official Site of ECAC Hockey

The ECAC Hockey Tournament is the conference tournament for ECAC Hockey. The winner of the tournament receives an automatic berth into the NCAA Tournament, which has occurred every year the NCAA has allowed automatic berths into the tournament. The ECAC tournament champion has only once not received an invitation to the NCAA tournament, that coming in 1963 when Harvard won its first conference championship (the second year in existence for the ECAC).

The tournament was first held in 1962, the first year of conference play. It was held at Boston Arena in Boston from 1962–1966. It then moved to the much larger Boston Garden from 1967–1992 (capacity for ice hockey games was 14,000+ in the Garden as opposed to the ~4,000 at the Arena). Because of a schism that occurred in the ECAC that saw most Boston-area schools break away and form the Hockey East conference in 1984, the championship rounds moved to the Olympic Arena in Lake Placid, New York, for the next decade (1993–2002). From 2003–2010, along with a change to the tournament format, the semifinal and championship games were moved to the Pepsi Arena in Albany, New York, which changed its name to the 'Times Union Center' in 2007. From 2011–2013, the final four games were held at the Boardwalk Hall in Atlantic City, New Jersey, and afterwards it was announced that the 2014 championship would return to Lake Placid and play at the since renamed Herb Brooks Arena.

== History ==
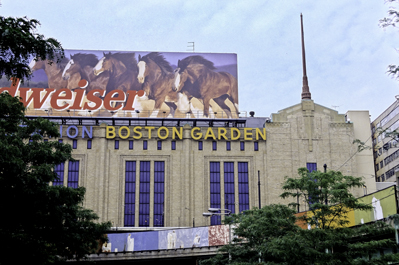
The Boston Garden hosted the ECAC tournament final from 1967 to 1992.

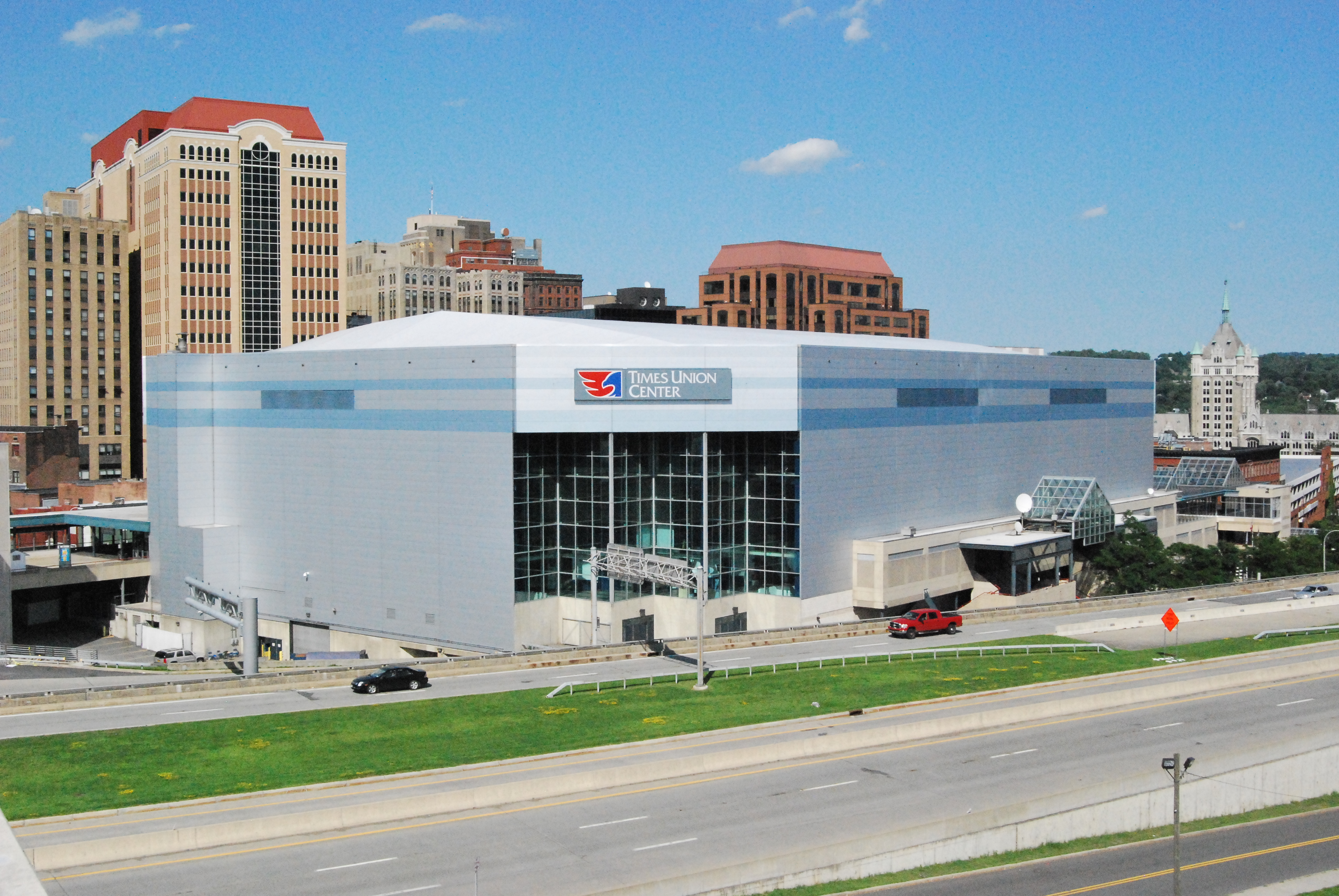
The Times Union Center hosted the ECAC tournament final from 2003 to 2010.

In 1960, two play-in games were held for the top four eastern teams that were up for two spots in the NCAA tournament. About a year and a half later, ECAC Hockey was founded and included nearly 30 programs. Despite the cumbersome arrangement, the league held its first conference tournament in 1962 and has crowned a champion every year since, with the exception of 2020.

In response to a threat from the Ivy League schools to split from the conference over scheduling disagreements, the six teams that comprised the East Division left the conference to form Hockey East in 1984. ECAC Hockey still contained eleven teams after the break and was able to retain its automatic bid to the tournament, a necessity for the stability of a conference.

The tournament was first hosted at the Boston Arena and was moved to the Boston Garden in 1967. The tournament remained there through 1992 and was succeeded by the Herb Brooks Arena in Lake Placid, New York, from 1993 to 2002 and again from 2014 to the present. The Times Union Center and Boardwalk Hall have also hosted ECAC tournament championships.

Cornell has won the most ECAC Hockey championships with 14 and also has the most championship game appearances with 25. Former Cornell coach Mike Schafer has won the most championships with seven and also has coached in the most championship games with 14 appearances.

In 1989, the championship trophy was renamed in honor of retiring commissioner Scotty Whitelaw.

== Formats ==
1962

The ECAC Hockey Tournament format begins as a single-game elimination three-round format featuring the top eight teams in the standings.

1983

The quarterfinal round is changed to a two-game format where if the two teams are tied after the two games are completed, a 10-minute 'mini-game' is held to determine who advances. Overtime is not played in the quarterfinals outside the mini-games.

1990

Two preliminary games are added to determine the final two qualifiers in the tournament played between the teams that finished seventh thru tenth in the standings.

1992

The quarterfinal round was changed to a single-elimination format.

1993

The quarterfinal round was converted into a modified best-of-three series where the first team to receive three points would advance (2 points for a win, 1 point for a tie) with only the third game permitted to continue past a 5-minute overtime if the score was still tied.

1998

The preliminary round was scrapped and the quarterfinal round expanded into 5 modified best-of-three series. The two lowest-seeded teams to advance out of the quarterfinals would then play in a single 'Four vs. Five' game to determine the final semifinalist.

2000

The quarterfinal round was altered to include standard best-of-three series with no ties allowed.

2003

ECAC Hockey added a fourth round to the tournament (called the 'First Round') and includes all 12 conference teams in the tournament. The First Round pits the fifth thru twelfth teams in the standings in four best-of-three series, with the winners advancing to the quarterfinals. The top four teams in the standings automatically advance to the quarterfinal round and play the remaining four teams in reverse order of their finish in the standings in a second best-of-three round. The semifinal, third-place and championship games are all single-elimination.

2014

The third place game was eliminated.

2021

Due to the COVID-19 pandemic, only four competing institutions competed in a single-elimination tournament over the course of one championship weekend.

2023

The First Round of the tournament was changed from a best-of-three format to single-elimination. The quarterfinals remained best-of-three, however, along with the semifinals and final both being single games.

== Champions ==
Year	Winning team	Coach	Losing team	Coach	Score	Location	Venue	Ref
1962	St. Lawrence	George Menard	Clarkson	Len Ceglarski	5–2	Boston	Boston Arena	
1963	Harvard	Cooney Weiland	Boston College	John Kelley	4–3 (OT)	Boston	Boston Arena	
1964	Providence	Tom Eccleston	St. Lawrence	George Menard	3–1	Boston	Boston Arena	
1965	Boston College	John Kelley	Brown	James Fullerton	6–2	Boston	Boston Arena	
1966	Clarkson	Len Ceglarski	Cornell	Ned Harkness	6–2	Boston	Boston Arena	
1967	Cornell	Ned Harkness	Boston University	Jack Kelley	4–3	Boston	Boston Garden	
1968	Cornell	Ned Harkness	Boston College	John Kelley	6–3	Boston	Boston Garden	
1969	Cornell	Ned Harkness	Harvard	Cooney Weiland	4–2	Boston	Boston Garden	
1970	Cornell	Ned Harkness	Clarkson	Len Ceglarski	3–2	Boston	Boston Garden	
1971	Harvard	Cooney Weiland	Clarkson	Len Ceglarski	7–4	Boston	Boston Garden	
1972	Boston University	Jack Kelley	Cornell	Dick Bertrand	4–1	Boston	Boston Garden	
1973	Cornell	Dick Bertrand	Boston College	Len Ceglarski	3–2	Boston	Boston Garden	
1974	Boston University	Jack Parker	Harvard	Bill Cleary	4–2	Boston	Boston Garden	
1975	Boston University	Jack Parker	Harvard	Bill Cleary	7–3	Boston	Boston Garden	
1976	Boston University	Jack Parker	Brown	Richard Toomey	9–2	Boston	Boston Garden	
1977	Boston University	Jack Parker	New Hampshire	Charlie Holt	8–6	Boston	Boston Garden	
1978	Boston College	Len Ceglarski	Providence	Lou Lamoriello	4–2	Boston	Boston Garden	
1979	New Hampshire	Charlie Holt	Dartmouth	George Crowe	3–2	Boston	Boston Garden	
1980	Cornell	Dick Bertrand	Dartmouth	George Crowe	5–1	Boston	Boston Garden	
1981	Providence	Lou Lamoriello	Cornell	Dick Bertrand	8–4	Boston	Boston Garden	
1982	Northeastern	Fern Flaman	Harvard	Bill Cleary	5–2	Boston	Boston Garden	
1983	Harvard	Bill Cleary	Providence	Lou Lamoriello	4–1 (OT)	Boston	Boston Garden	
1984	Rensselaer	Mike Addesa	Boston University	Jack Parker	5–2	Boston	Boston Garden	
1985	Rensselaer	Mike Addesa	Harvard	Bill Cleary	5–1	Boston	Boston Garden	
1986	Cornell	Lou Reycroft	Clarkson	Cap Raeder	3–2 (OT)	Boston	Boston Garden	
1987	Harvard	Bill Cleary	St. Lawrence	Joe Marsh	6–3	Boston	Boston Garden	
1988	St. Lawrence	Joe Marsh	Clarkson	Cap Raeder	3–0	Boston	Boston Garden	
1989	St. Lawrence	Joe Marsh	Vermont	Mike Gilligan	4–1	Boston	Boston Garden	
1990	Colgate	Terry Slater	Rensselaer	Buddy Powers	5–4	Boston	Boston Garden	
1991	Clarkson	Mark Morris	St. Lawrence	Joe Marsh	5–4	Boston	Boston Garden	
1992	St. Lawrence	Joe Marsh	Cornell	Brian McCutcheon	4–2	Boston	Boston Garden	
1993	Clarkson	Mark Morris	Brown	Bob Gaudet	3–1	Lake Placid, New York	Olympic Arena	
1994	Harvard	Ronn Tomassoni	Rensselaer	Buddy Powers	3–0	Lake Placid, New York	Olympic Arena	
1995	Rensselaer	Dan Fridgen	Princeton	Don Cahoon	5–1	Lake Placid, New York	Olympic Arena	
1996	Cornell	Mike Schafer	Harvard	Ronn Tomassoni	2–1	Lake Placid, New York	Olympic Arena	
1997	Cornell	Mike Schafer	Clarkson	Mark Morris	2–1	Lake Placid, New York	Olympic Arena	
1998	Princeton	Don Cahoon	Clarkson	Mark Morris	5–4 (OT)	Lake Placid, New York	Olympic Arena	
1999	Clarkson	Mark Morris	St. Lawrence	Joe Marsh	3–2	Lake Placid, New York	Olympic Arena	
2000	St. Lawrence	Joe Marsh	Rensselaer	Dan Fridgen	2–0	Lake Placid, New York	Olympic Arena	
2001	St. Lawrence	Joe Marsh	Cornell	Mike Schafer	3–1	Lake Placid, New York	Olympic Arena	
2002	Harvard	Mark Mazzoleni	Cornell	Mike Schafer	4–3 (2OT)	Lake Placid, New York	Olympic Arena	
2003	Cornell	Mike Schafer	Harvard	Mark Mazzoleni	3–2 (OT)	Albany, New York	Pepsi Arena	
2004	Harvard	Mark Mazzoleni	Clarkson	George Roll	4–2	Albany, New York	Pepsi Arena	
2005	Cornell	Mike Schafer	Harvard	Ted Donato	3–1	Albany, New York	Pepsi Arena	
2006	Harvard	Ted Donato	Cornell	Mike Schafer	6–2	Albany, New York	Pepsi Arena	
2007	Clarkson	George Roll	Quinnipiac	Rand Pecknold	4–2	Albany, New York	Times Union Center	
2008	Princeton	Guy Gadowsky	Harvard	Ted Donato	4–1	Albany, New York	Times Union Center	
2009	Yale	Keith Allain	Cornell	Mike Schafer	5–0	Albany, New York	Times Union Center	
2010	Cornell	Mike Schafer	Union	Nate Leaman	3–0	Albany, New York	Times Union Center	
2011	Yale	Keith Allain	Cornell	Mike Schafer	6–0	Atlantic City, New Jersey	Boardwalk Hall	
2012	Union	Rick Bennett	Harvard	Ted Donato	3–2	Atlantic City, New Jersey	Boardwalk Hall	
2013	Union	Rick Bennett	Brown	Brendan Whittet	3–1	Atlantic City, New Jersey	Boardwalk Hall	
2014	Union	Rick Bennett	Colgate	Don Vaughan	5–2	Lake Placid, New York	Herb Brooks Arena	
2015	Harvard	Ted Donato	Colgate	Don Vaughan	4–2	Lake Placid, New York	Herb Brooks Arena	
2016	Quinnipiac	Rand Pecknold	Harvard	Ted Donato	4–1	Lake Placid, New York	Herb Brooks Arena	
2017	Harvard	Ted Donato	Cornell	Mike Schafer	4–1	Lake Placid, New York	Herb Brooks Arena	
2018	Princeton	Ron Fogarty	Clarkson	Casey Jones	2–1 (OT)	Lake Placid, New York	Herb Brooks Arena	
2019	Clarkson	Casey Jones	Cornell	Mike Schafer	3–2 (OT)	Lake Placid, New York	Herb Brooks Arena	
2020	Cancelled due to the coronavirus pandemic							
2021	St. Lawrence	Brent Brekke	Quinnipiac	Rand Pecknold	3–2 (OT)	Hamden, Connecticut	People's United Center	
2022	Harvard	Ted Donato	Quinnipiac	Rand Pecknold	3–2 (OT)	Lake Placid, New York	Herb Brooks Arena	
2023	Colgate	Don Vaughan	Harvard	Ted Donato	3–2	Lake Placid, New York	Herb Brooks Arena	
2024	Cornell	Mike Schafer	St. Lawrence	Brent Brekke	3–1	Lake Placid, New York	Herb Brooks Arena	
2025	Cornell	Mike Schafer	Clarkson	Jean-François Houle	3–1	Lake Placid, New York	Herb Brooks Arena	
2026	Dartmouth	Reid Cashman	Princeton	Ben Syer	2–1 (OT)	Lake Placid, New York	Herb Brooks Arena	

=== Championships by School ===
School	Championships	Appearances	Win%
Cornell	14	25	.560
Harvard	11	23	.478
St. Lawrence	7	12	.583
Clarkson	6	16	.375
Boston University	5	7	.714
Rensselaer	3	6	.500
Princeton	3	5	.600
Union	3	4	.750
Boston College	2	5	.400
Providence	2	4	.500
Colgate	2	4	.500
Yale	2	2	1.000
Quinnipiac	1	4	.250
Dartmouth	1	3	.333
New Hampshire	1	2	.500
Northeastern	1	1	1.000
Brown	0	4	.000
Vermont	0	1	.000

=== By coach ===
Appearances	Coach	Record	Pct
14	Mike Schafer	7–7	.500
9	Ted Donato	4–5	.444
8	Joe Marsh	5–3	.625
6	Bill Cleary	2–4	.333
6	Len Ceglarski	2–4	.333
5	Jack Parker	4–1	.800
5	Ned Harkness	4–1	.800
5	Mark Morris	3–2	.600
4	Dick Bertrand	2–2	.500
4	Rand Pecknold	1–3	.250
3	Rick Bennett	3–0	1.000
3	Mark Mazzoleni	2–1	.667
3	Cooney Weiland	2–1	.667
3	Don Vaughan	1–2	.333
3	Lou Lamoriello	1–2	.333
3	John Kelley	1–2	.333
2	Keith Allain	2–0	1.000
2	Mike Addesa	2–0	1.000
2	Brent Brekke	1–1	.500
2	Casey Jones	1–1	.500
2	George Roll	1–1	.500
2	Dan Fridgen	1–1	.500
2	Don Cahoon	1–1	.500
2	Ronn Tomassoni	1–1	.500
2	Charlie Holt	1–1	.500
2	Jack Kelley	1–1	.500
2	George Menard	1–1	.500
2	Buddy Powers	0–2	.000
2	Cap Raeder	0–2	.000
2	George Crowe	0–2	.000
1	Reid Cashman	1–0	1.000
1	Ron Fogarty	1–0	1.000
1	Guy Gadowsky	1–0	1.000
1	Terry Slater	1–0	1.000
1	Lou Reycroft	1–0	1.000
1	Fern Flaman	1–0	1.000
1	Tom Eccleston	1–0	1.000
1	Ben Syer	0–1	.000
1	Jean-François Houle	0–1	.000
1	Brendan Whittet	0–1	.000
1	Nate Leaman	0–1	.000
1	Bob Gaudet	0–1	.000
1	Brian McCutcheon	0–1	.000
1	Mike Gilligan	0–1	.000
1	Richard Toomey	0–1	.000
1	James Fullerton	0–1	.000

== Performance by team ==
The code in each cell represents the furthest the team made it in the respective tournament:

- – Team not in ECAC Hockey
- FR Preliminary / First round (4 teams from 1990 to 1997, 10 teams from 1998 to 2002, 8 teams afterwards)
- QF Quarterfinals (2 teams from 1998 to 2002, no quarterfinals in 2021)
- SF Semifinals (2 teams 2021)
- F Finals
- CH Champion

Note: the remainder of the 2020 tournament was cancelled prior to the start of the quarterfinal round.

School	#	QF	SF	F	CH	62	63	64	65	66	67	68	69	70	71	72	73	74	75	76	77	78	79	80	81	82	83	84	85	86	87	88	89	90	91	92	93	94	95	96	97	98	99	00	01	02	03	04	05	06	07	08	09	10	11	12	13	14	15	16	17	18	19	20	21	22	23	24	25	26
Cornell	56	52	42	25	14				QF	F	CH	CH	CH	CH	SF	F	CH	SF	SF	SF	SF	QF	SF	CH	F				SF	CH		QF	SF	SF	SF	F		QF	QF	CH	CH	QF	FR	SF	F	F	CH	QF	CH	F	QF	SF	F	CH	F	SF	QF	SF	FR	QF	F	SF	F	QF	–	QF	SF	CH	CH	SF
Harvard	57	49	36	23	11	SF	CH	QF			QF	QF	F	SF	CH	SF	QF	F	F	SF						F	CH	QF	F	SF	CH	SF	SF	QF	SF	QF	SF	CH	QF	F	QF	SF	FR	FR	SF	CH	F	CH	F	CH	QF	F	FR	QF	QF	F	FR	FR	CH	F	CH	SF	SF	QF	–	CH	F	QF	QF	QF
St. Lawrence	53	36	20	12	7	CH	SF	F		QF	SF	QF	QF	QF				QF								QF	SF		QF	QF	F	CH	CH	QF	F	CH	QF	FR	FR	QF	FR	FR	F	CH	CH	FR	FR	QF	QF	QF	SF	FR	SF	SF	QF	FR	QF	QF	SF	SF	QF	FR	FR	FR	CH	QF	QF	F	FR	FR
Clarkson	63	51	36	16	6	F	SF	SF	SF	CH	QF	SF	SF	F	F	QF	SF		QF	QF	SF	QF	QF	SF	SF	SF	QF	SF	SF	F	QF	F	QF	SF	CH	SF	CH	SF	SF	SF	F	F	CH	QF	FR	SF	FR	F	QF	QF	CH	QF	FR	FR	FR	FR	FR	QF	FR	QF	QF	F	CH	QF		SF	QF	FR	F	SF
Boston University	17	17	15	7	5				SF	SF	F	SF	SF	SF	SF	CH	QF	CH	CH	CH	CH	SF	SF				QF	F	–	–	–	–	–	–	–	–	–	–	–	–	–	–	–	–	–	–	–	–	–	–	–	–	–	–	–	–	–	–	–	–	–	–	–	–	–	–	–	–	–	–
Rensselaer	53	36	14	6	3	QF		SF					QF		QF	QF	QF	SF			QF	QF		QF			QF	CH	CH	QF	SF	QF	QF	F	QF	SF	SF	F	CH	QF	SF	FR	SF	F	FR	SF	QF	QF	FR	FR	FR	FR	QF	FR	FR	QF	QF	FR	QF	QF	FR	FR	FR	QF	–	QF	FR	QF	FR	FR
Princeton	39	17	8	5	3							QF																	QF			QF		FR	FR	QF	QF	FR	F	FR	SF	CH	SF	FR	FR	FR	FR	FR	FR	FR	QF	CH	SF	FR	FR	FR	FR	FR	FR	FR	QF	CH	FR	QF	–	FR	QF	FR	FR	F
Union	28	17	5	4	3	–	–	–	–	–	–	–	–	–	–	–	–	–	–	–	–	–	–	–	–	–	–	–	–	–	–	–	–	–	–			QF	FR		QF			FR	FR		FR	FR	FR	FR	FR	QF	QF	F	QF	CH	CH	CH	QF	FR	SF	QF	QF	FR	–	QF	FR	QF	QF	QF
Boston College	17	17	7	5	2	QF	F	QF	CH	QF	SF	F	QF	QF			F			QF	QF	CH		QF	QF	QF		SF	–	–	–	–	–	–	–	–	–	–	–	–	–	–	–	–	–	–	–	–	–	–	–	–	–	–	–	–	–	–	–	–	–	–	–	–	–	–	–	–	–	–
Colgate	48	37	15	4	2		QF	QF		QF														QF	SF	QF		QF	QF	QF	QF	QF	QF	CH	QF	FR	QF	QF	SF	QF	FR	FR	QF	SF		FR	QF	SF	SF	SF	QF	SF	FR	QF	SF	SF	FR	F	F	FR	FR	QF	FR	QF	SF	SF	CH	QF	QF	QF
Providence	16	16	5	4	2	QF	QF	CH	QF						QF	QF		QF	QF		QF	F	QF	SF	CH	QF	F	QF	–	–	–	–	–	–	–	–	–	–	–	–	–	–	–	–	–	–	–	–	–	–	–	–	–	–	–	–	–	–	–	–	–	–	–	–	–	–	–	–	–	–
Yale	40	27	6	2	2						QF												QF				QF		QF	SF	SF		QF	QF	QF	QF	QF				QF	SF	FR	FR	FR	FR	QF	FR	FR	QF	FR	QF	CH	QF	CH	QF	SF	QF	QF	QF	QF	FR	QF	QF	–	FR	QF	FR	FR	FR
Quinnipiac	21	20	10	4	1	–	–	–	–	–	–	–	–	–	–	–	–	–	–	–	–	–	–	–	–	–	–	–	–	–	–	–	–	–	–	–	–	–	–	–	–	–	–	–	–	–	–	–	–	QF	F	QF	QF	QF	QF	QF	SF	SF	SF	CH	SF	QF	QF	QF	F	F	SF	SF	SF	QF
Dartmouth	33	23	12	3	1				QF									QF		QF			F	F													FR			FR				FR	SF	QF	SF	SF	QF	SF	SF	FR	FR	FR	SF	QF	QF	QF	QF	SF	FR	QF	QF	FR	–	FR	FR	SF	SF	CH
New Hampshire	14	14	5	2	1				–	–			QF	QF		SF	QF	QF	QF	QF	F	QF	CH		QF	SF	SF	QF	–	–	–	–	–	–	–	–	–	–	–	–	–	–	–	–	–	–	–	–	–	–	–	–	–	–	–	–	–	–	–	–	–	–	–	–	–	–	–	–	–	–
Northeastern	4	4	1	1	1				QF	QF															QF	CH			–	–	–	–	–	–	–	–	–	–	–	–	–	–	–	–	–	–	–	–	–	–	–	–	–	–	–	–	–	–	–	–	–	–	–	–	–	–	–	–	–	–
Brown	45	26	10	4	0		QF		F	SF	QF	QF		QF	QF				QF	F	QF	SF									QF			QF	FR	QF	F	SF	QF	QF		FR	FR			FR	SF	QF	QF	FR	FR	FR	QF	SF	FR	FR	F	FR	FR	FR	FR	FR	SF	FR	–	FR	FR	FR	QF	FR
Vermont	21	15	5	1	0	–	–		–	–	–	–	–	–	–	–	–	–	SF				QF	QF						QF	QF	SF	F	FR	QF	FR	FR	QF	QF	SF	QF	FR	FR		QF		QF	FR	SF	–	–	–	–	–	–	–	–	–	–	–	–	–	–	–	–	–	–	–	–	–
Pennsylvania	3	3	1	0	0	–	–	–	–	–	–				QF	QF	SF						–	–	–	–	–	–	–	–	–	–	–	–	–	–	–	–	–	–	–	–	–	–	–	–	–	–	–	–	–	–	–	–	–	–	–	–	–	–	–	–	–	–	–	–	–	–	–	–
Colby	1	1	1	0	0	SF			–	–	–	–	–	–	–	–	–	–	–	–	–	–	–	–	–	–	–	–	–	–	–	–	–	–	–	–	–	–	–	–	–	–	–	–	–	–	–	–	–	–	–	–	–	–	–	–	–	–	–	–	–	–	–	–	–	–	–	–	–	–
Army	3	3	0	0	0	QF	QF	QF										–	–	–	–	–	–	–												–	–	–	–	–	–	–	–	–	–	–	–	–	–	–	–	–	–	–	–	–	–	–	–	–	–	–	–	–	–	–	–	–	–	–
Maine	1	1	0	0	0	–	–	–	–	–	–	–	–	–	–	–	–	–	–	–	–	–	–		QF				–	–	–	–	–	–	–	–	–	–	–	–	–	–	–	–	–	–	–	–	–	–	–	–	–	–	–	–	–	–	–	–	–	–	–	–	–	–	–	–	–	–
