= C. J. Young =

American ice hockey player (born 1968)

- Born: January 1, 1968 (age 58) Waban, Massachusetts, U.S.
- Height: 5 ft 10 in (178 cm)
- Weight: 180 lb (82 kg; 12 st 12 lb)
- Position: Right wing
- Shot: Right
- Played for: Calgary Flames; Boston Bruins
- National team: United States
- NHL draft: 1989 NHL Supplemental Draft; New Jersey Devils
- Playing career: 1990–1993

Carl Joshua Young (born January 1, 1968) is an American former professional ice hockey right winger who played 44 games in the National Hockey League (NHL) in 1992–93 and competed in the 1992 Winter Olympics. A decorated college athlete, Young played four seasons with the Harvard Crimson program and was a member of the school's 1989 national championship. The New Jersey Devils selected him with the fifth overall in the 1989 NHL Supplemental Draft, though he never played for the team. Young signed with the Calgary Flames in 1990 and made his NHL debut with the team two years later. He was traded to the Boston Bruins mid-season. Young signed with the Florida Panthers prior to the 1993–94 season, but left the sport after becoming embroiled in a dispute with the team.

== Early life ==
Young was born January 1, 1968, in Waban, Massachusetts. As a youth, he played in the 1981 Quebec International Pee-Wee Hockey Tournament with the Boston Bruins minor ice hockey team. He attended Belmont Hill School where he played on the varsity hockey, lacrosse and soccer teams. Young attended Harvard University where he majored in history.

== Playing career ==
=== College ===
While attending Harvard, Young played four seasons of college hockey with the Crimson men's hockey program between 1986 and 1990. He recorded 29 points each in his freshman and sophomore seasons, in 34 and 28 games respectively. Also as a sophomore, Young made his first international appearance as he joined the American junior team for the 1988 World Junior Ice Hockey Championships in Moscow. He scored two goals and added an assist in seven games for the sixth-place Americans.

In the 1988–89 season, Young joined with Lane MacDonald and Allen Bourbeau to form what became known as the "line of fire" as the trio led Harvard offensively. Young was among the team leaders in goal scoring with 33 in all competitions, and was named to the East Coast Athletic Conference (ECAC) second all-star team. On December 12, 1988, Young set an NCAA record for the fastest hat trick by scoring three goals in 49 seconds – all shorthanded. The Crimson reached the 1989 Frozen Four tournament where they defeated the Minnesota Golden Gophers in the national championship final, 4–3 in overtime, to claim Harvard's first hockey championship, and the first national team championship in the school's history.

The New Jersey Devils selected Young with the fifth overall selection at the 1989 NHL Supplemental Draft, but returned to Harvard for his senior year where he was voted the team's captain. He recorded 49 points in 28 games and was named to the ECAC's first all-star team. Young was also named Ivy League player of the year, and was named to his third All-Ivy team. He graduated as one of the school's all-time leaders in goals (84) and points (162) and was elected to the Harvard Varsity Club Hall of Fame in 2005.

=== Professional ===
After failing to sign a contract with the Devils, Young joined the Calgary Flames organization as a free agent in 1990. The Flames assigned him to their International Hockey League (IHL) affiliate, the Salt Lake Golden Eagles for the 1990–91 season where he recorded 31 goals and 67 points in 80 games. He was voted the recipient of the Ken McKenzie Trophy as the IHL's American-born rookie of the year. Young spent most of the 1991–92 season with the United States National Team as it travelled in a barnstorming tour in advance of the 1992 Winter Olympics; Young recorded 17 goals and 17 assists in 49 games with the team. He scored one goal and added three assists in eight games at the 1992 Olympic hockey tournament, for the American team that finished in fourth place. Young Rejoined the Golden Eagles for the remainder of the season where he posted four points in nine games.

Initially unable to come to terms on a new contract prior to the 1992–93 NHL season, Young was absent from the Flames' training camp. He missed the first part of the season before coming to terms with the team on a one-year deal, and on November 21, 1992, made his NHL debut as a replacement for injured forward Joe Nieuwendyk in a 4–3 loss to the New York Islanders. He scored his first two NHL goals on December 31 in a 5–3 victory over the Montreal Canadiens. Head coach Dave King praised his skating ability and defensive play, however in a bid to add veteran experience to the roster, the Flames traded Young to the Boston Bruins on February 1, 1993 in exchange for Brent Ashton. In his fifth game with the Bruins, Young again recorded a two-goal effort in a victory over Montreal. He finished the season in the American Hockey League (AHL) with the Providence Bruins, but appeared in 43 NHL games combined between Calgary and Boston, recording 7 goals and 14 points.

Again a free agent prior to the 1993–94 season, Young opted to join the expansion Florida Panthers, and turned down a superior offer from the Bruins, as he felt he had a better opportunity to play with the Panthers. However, his negotiations with Florida general manager Bob Clarke bogged down in a dispute over whether the team would release him to the American National Team for the 1994 Olympic tournament if he was demoted to the minor leagues. He attended the Panthers' training camp without a contract, and ultimately agreed to a two-year contract without an Olympic participation guarantee, on September 27, 1993. Four days later, the team assigned him to the IHL's Cincinnati Cyclones. Unhappy with how the Panthers handled the situation, Young chose not to report and returned to his Boston home. He never returned to organized hockey.

== Career statistics ==
=== Regular season and playoffs ===
			Regular season					Playoffs
Season	Team	League	GP	G	A	Pts	PIM	GP	G	A	Pts	PIM
1984–85	Belmont Hill School	HS-Prep	—	—	—	—	—	—	—	—	—	—
1985–86	Belmont Hill School	HS-Prep	21	19	19	38	4	—	—	—	—	—
1986–87	Harvard Crimson	ECAC	34	17	12	29	30	—	—	—	—	—
1987–88	Harvard Crimson	ECAC	28	13	16	29	40	—	—	—	—	—
1988–89	Harvard Crimson	ECAC	36	20	31	51	36	—	—	—	—	—
1989–90	Harvard Crimson	ECAC	28	21	28	49	32	—	—	—	—	—
1990–91	Salt Lake Golden Eagles	IHL	80	31	36	67	43	4	1	2	3	2
1991–92	United States National Team	Intl	49	17	17	34	38	—	—	—	—	—
1991–92	Salt Lake Golden Eagles	IHL	9	2	2	4	1	5	0	1	1	4
1992–93	Calgary Flames	NHL	28	3	2	5	20	—	—	—	—	—
1992–93	Boston Bruins	NHL	15	4	5	9	12	—	—	—	—	—
1992–93	Providence Bruins	AHL	7	4	3	7	26	6	1	0	1	16
NHL totals			43	7	7	14	32	—	—	—	—	—

=== International ===
Year	Team	Event	GP	G	A	Pts	PIM
1988	United States	WJC	7	2	1	3	8
1992	United States	OG	8	1	3	4	4
Senior totals			8	1	3	4	4

== Awards and honors ==
Career
Award	Year	Ref.
All-ECAC Hockey Second team	1988–89	
AHCA East Second-Team All-American	1988–89	
All-ECAC Hockey First Team	1989–90	
AHCA East Second-Team All-American	1989–90	
Ken McKenzie Trophy; IHL – US-born Rookie of the Year	1990–91	
