= 1989 ECAC Hockey men's ice hockey tournament =

1989 ECAC Men's ice hockey tournament
- Dates: March 3–11, 1989
- Teams: 8
- Finals site: Boston Garden; Boston, Massachusetts
- Champions: St. Lawrence (3rd title)
- Winning coach: Joe Marsh (2nd title)
- MVP: Doug Murray (St. Lawrence)
- ECAC Men's Ice Hockey Tournaments

The 1989 ECAC Hockey Men's Ice Hockey Tournament was the 28th tournament in league history. It was played between March 3 and March 11, 1989. Quarterfinal games were played at home team campus sites, while the 'final four' games were played at the Boston Garden in Boston, Massachusetts. By winning the tournament, St. Lawrence received the ECAC's automatic bid to the 1989 NCAA Division I Men's Ice Hockey Tournament.

== Format ==
The tournament featured three rounds of play. The four teams that finished below eighth place in the standings were not eligible for tournament play. In the quarterfinals, the first seed and eighth seed, the second seed and seventh seed, the third seed and sixth seed, and the fourth seed and fifth seed played a two-game series to determine the winner.

In the two games, no overtime was permitted and if the two teams remained tied after the two games, then a 10-minute mini-game would be played where a sudden-death overtime was allowed if the scheduled time did not produce a victor. After the opening round every series becomes a single-elimination game. In the semifinals, the highest seed plays the lowest remaining seed while the two remaining teams play with the winners advancing to the championship game and the losers advancing to the third place game. The tournament champion receives an automatic bid to the 1989 NCAA Division I Men's Ice Hockey Tournament.

== Conference standings ==
Note: GP = Games played; W = Wins; L = Losses; T = Ties; PTS = Points; GF = Goals For; GA = Goals Against

1988–89 ECAC Hockey standings
	Conference							Overall					
	GP	W	L	T	PTS	GF	GA	GP	W	L	T	GF	GA
Harvard†	22	20	2	0	40	130	49	34	31	3	0	191	89
St. Lawrence*	22	18	4	0	36	99	56	36	29	7	0	169	95
Colgate	22	15	6	1	31	108	82	31	19	10	2	161	118
Clarkson	22	13	7	2	28	104	87	32	16	13	3	135	129
Cornell	22	13	9	0	26	76	74	30	16	13	1	113	100
Vermont	22	13	9	0	26	108	73	34	20	13	1	158	116
Yale	22	10	12	0	20	72	84	31	11	19	1	99	137
Rensselaer	22	8	12	2	18	74	82	32	12	17	3	118	123
Dartmouth	22	7	14	1	15	70	96	26	8	17	1	82	113
Army	22	6	15	1	13	62	108	30	13	16	1	93	125
Princeton	22	4	17	1	9	73	113	26	6	19	1	97	133
Brown	22	1	21	0	2	51	132	26	1	25	0	58	155
Championship: St. Lawrence † indicates conference regular season champion * indicates conference tournament champion (Whitelaw Cup)

== Bracket ==
Teams are reseeded after the first round

Quarterfinals; March 3–4
1	Harvard	7	5	—
8	Rensselaer	3	4	—
2	St. Lawrence	2	9	—
7	Yale	1	2	—
(Pairings are reseeded after the first round)
3	Colgate	2	4	—
6	Vermont	2	8	—
4	Clarkson	3	0	—
5	Cornell	5	0	—

Semifinals; March 10
1	Harvard	2
6	Vermont	3*
2	St. Lawrence	6
5	Cornell	1

Championship; March 11
2	St. Lawrence	4
6	Vermont	1
Third Place
1	Harvard	6
5	Cornell	3

Note: * denotes overtime period(s)

=== Quarterfinals ===
==== (1) Harvard vs. (8) Rensselaer ====
March 3	Harvard	7 – 3	Rensselaer	Bright Hockey Center

March 4	Harvard	5 – 4	Rensselaer	Bright Hockey Center

Harvard won series 2–0

==== (2) St. Lawrence vs. (7) Yale ====
March 3	St. Lawrence	2 – 1	Yale	Appleton Arena

March 4	St. Lawrence	9 – 2	Yale	Appleton Arena

St. Lawrence won series 2–0

==== (3) Colgate vs. (6) Vermont ====
March 3	Colgate	2 – 2	Vermont	Starr Rink

March 4	Colgate	4 – 8	Vermont	Starr Rink

Vermont won series 1–0–1

==== (4) Clarkson vs. (5) Cornell ====
March 3	Clarkson	3 – 5	Cornell	Walker Arena

March 4	Clarkson	0 – 0	Cornell	Walker Arena

Cornell won series 1–0–1

=== Semifinals ===
==== (1) Harvard vs. (6) Vermont ====
March 10	Harvard	2 – 3	OT	Vermont	Boston Garden

==== (2) St. Lawrence vs. (5) Cornell ====
March 10	St. Lawrence	6 – 1	Cornell	Boston Garden

=== Third Place ===
==== (1) Harvard vs. (5) Cornell ====
March 11	Harvard	6 – 3	Cornell	Boston Garden

=== Championship ===
==== (2) St. Lawrence vs. (6) Vermont ====
March 11	St. Lawrence	4 – 1	Vermont	Boston Garden

== Tournament awards ==
=== All-Tournament Team ===
- F Lane MacDonald (Harvard)
- F Ian Boyce (Vermont)
- F Doug Murray* (St. Lawrence)
- D Russ Mann (St. Lawrence)
- D Mike Hurlbut (St. Lawrence)
- G Paul Cohen (St. Lawrence)

* Most Outstanding Player(s)
