= Ted Donato =

American ice hockey player and coach (born 1969)

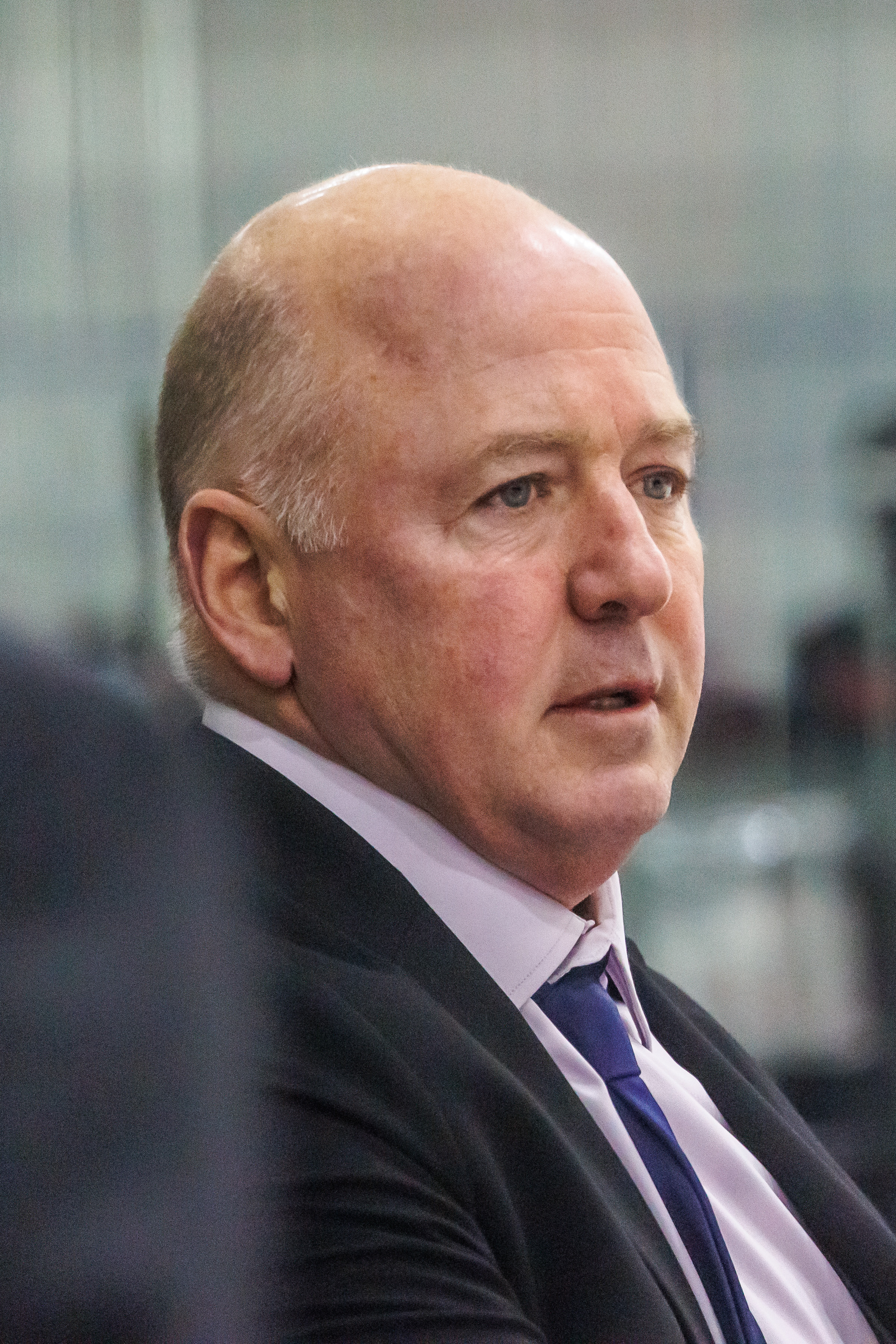
- Donato in 2023
- Born: April 28, 1969 (age 57) Boston, Massachusetts, U.S.
- Height: 5 ft 10 in (178 cm)
- Weight: 180 lb (82 kg; 12 st 12 lb)
- Position: Left wing
- Shot: Left
- Played for: Boston Bruins; New York Islanders; Ottawa Senators; Mighty Ducks of Anaheim; Dallas Stars; Los Angeles Kings; St. Louis Blues; New York Rangers
- National team: United States
- NHL draft: 98th overall, 1987; Boston Bruins
- Playing career: 1991–2004
- Coaching career

Biographical details
- Education: Harvard

Coaching career (HC unless noted)
- 2004–2026: Harvard
- 2026-present: New Jersey Devils (assistant coach)

Head coaching record
- Overall: 334–292–77 (.530)
- Tournaments: 2–8 (.200)

Accomplishments and honors

Championships
- 4× ECAC Hockey tournament (2006, 2015, 2017, 2022; ECAC regular season (2017)

Edward Paul Donato (born April 28, 1969) is an American ice hockey coach and former player who is currently an assistant coach for the New Jersey Devils of the National Hockey League (NHL). He previously served as the head coach at Harvard University from 2004 to 2026, and is the winningest coach in program history.

== Early and personal life ==
Born in Boston, Massachusetts, Donato grew up in Dedham, Massachusetts and attended Catholic Memorial High School, where he became the high school's all-time leading goalscorer.

== Playing career ==
Donato was selected 98th overall in the 1987 NHL entry draft by the Boston Bruins. He played his high school hockey at Catholic Memorial, college hockey at Harvard University, and then moved up to the NHL for the 1991–92 season. Donato played 796 career NHL games, scoring 150 goals and 197 assists for 347 points. During his career, Donato played for the Bruins, New York Islanders, Ottawa Senators, Mighty Ducks of Anaheim, Dallas Stars, Los Angeles Kings, St. Louis Blues, and New York Rangers.

He played his youth hockey for the Hyde Park Eagles, a Boston neighborhood organization, where a banner still hangs honoring his time playing for Hyde Park Youth Hockey.

Donato is the second professional hockey player to appear on the show The Price Is Right (winning his way on-stage and making it to the Showcase Showdown), the first player in the NHL to appear.

In 2023 he would be named one of the top 100 Bruins players of all time.

== Coaching career ==
Donato was the head coach of his alma mater, Harvard University from 2004 to 2026. On December 6, 2025, following a 3–0 victory against the Brown Bears, Donato became the winningest men's ice hockey coach in Harvard history, surpassing his former coach Bill Cleary. On May 7, 2026, he stepped down as head coach. He finished his career as the all-time winningest coach in program history, with a 334–292–77 record and led the Crimson to the 2017 Frozen Four, and won four ECAC tournament championships.

On July 15, 2026, Donato was named assistant coach for the New Jersey Devils.

== Personal life ==
Donato is married to Jeannine Donato. The couple have four children. His son Ryan was selected by the Boston Bruins in the 2014 NHL entry draft and currently plays with the Chicago Blackhawks in the NHL.

== Career statistics ==
=== Regular season and playoffs ===
			Regular season					Playoffs
Season	Team	League	GP	G	A	Pts	PIM	GP	G	A	Pts	PIM
1986–87	Catholic Memorial School	HS-MA	22	29	34	63	30	—	—	—	—	—
1987–88	Harvard Crimson	ECAC	28	12	14	26	24	—	—	—	—	—
1988–89	Harvard Crimson	ECAC	34	14	37	51	30	—	—	—	—	—
1989–90	Harvard Crimson	ECAC	16	5	6	11	34	—	—	—	—	—
1990–91	Harvard Crimson	ECAC	28	19	37	56	26	—	—	—	—	—
1991–92	United States	Intl	52	11	22	33	24	—	—	—	—	—
1991–92	Boston Bruins	NHL	10	1	2	3	8	15	3	4	7	4
1992–93	Boston Bruins	NHL	82	15	20	35	61	4	0	1	1	0
1993–94	Boston Bruins	NHL	84	22	32	54	59	13	4	2	6	10
1994–95	TuTo Hockey	SM-l	14	5	5	10	47	—	—	—	—	—
1994–95	Boston Bruins	NHL	47	10	10	20	10	5	0	0	0	4
1995–96	Boston Bruins	NHL	82	23	26	49	46	5	1	2	3	2
1996–97	Boston Bruins	NHL	67	25	26	51	37	—	—	—	—	—
1997–98	Boston Bruins	NHL	79	16	23	39	54	5	0	0	0	2
1998–99	Boston Bruins	NHL	14	1	3	4	4	—	—	—	—	—
1998–99	New York Islanders	NHL	55	7	11	18	27	—	—	—	—	—
1998–99	Ottawa Senators	NHL	13	3	2	5	10	1	0	0	0	0
1999–2000	Mighty Ducks of Anaheim	NHL	81	11	19	30	26	—	—	—	—	—
2000–01	Dallas Stars	NHL	65	8	17	25	26	8	0	1	1	0
2001–02	Manchester Monarchs	AHL	36	18	25	43	19	5	1	3	4	0
2001–02	Bridgeport Sound Tigers	AHL	1	0	0	0	0	—	—	—	—	—
2001–02	New York Islanders	NHL	1	0	0	0	0	—	—	—	—	—
2001–02	Los Angeles Kings	NHL	2	0	0	0	2	—	—	—	—	—
2001–02	St. Louis Blues	NHL	2	0	0	0	2	—	—	—	—	—
2002–03	Hartford Wolf Pack	AHL	18	8	12	20	14	—	—	—	—	—
2002–03	New York Rangers	NHL	49	2	1	3	6	—	—	—	—	—
2003–04	Boston Bruins	NHL	63	6	5	11	18	2	0	0	0	0
2003–04	Providence Bruins	AHL	15	3	9	12	24	—	—	—	—	—
NHL totals			796	150	197	347	396	58	8	10	18	22

=== International ===
Year	Team	Event	Result	GP	G	A	Pts	PIM
1988	United States	WJC	6th	7	3	2	5	18
1992	United States	OG	4th	8	4	3	7	8
1997	United States	WC	6th	8	4	2	6	8
1999	United States	WC	6th	6	2	6	8	6
2002	United States	WC	7th	7	1	3	4	2
Junior totals				7	3	2	5	18
Senior totals				29	11	14	25	24

== Head coaching record ==
Record table
Season	Team	Overall	Conference	Standing	Postseason
Harvard Crimson (ECAC Hockey) (2004–present)
2004–05	Harvard	21–10–3	15–5–2	2nd	NCAA Northeast Regional Semifinals
2005–06	Harvard	21–12–2	13–8–2	4th	NCAA East Regional Semifinals
2006–07	Harvard	14–17–2	10–10–2	t-7th	ECAC Quarterfinals
2007–08	Harvard	17–13–4	12–7–3	3rd	ECAC Runner-Up
2008–09	Harvard	9–16–6	9–7–6	t-5th	ECAC First Round
2009–10	Harvard	9–21–3	7–12–3	t-8th	ECAC Quarterfinals
2010–11	Harvard	12–21–1	7–14–1	6th	ECAC Quarterfinals
2011–12	Harvard	13–10–11	8–5–9	3rd	ECAC Runner-Up
2012–13	Harvard	10–19–3	6–14–2	12th	ECAC First Round
2013–14	Harvard	10–17–4	6–12–4	11th	ECAC First Round
2014–15	Harvard	21–13–3	11–8–3	6th	NCAA Midwest Regional Semifinals
2015–16	Harvard	19–11–4	12–6–4	3rd	NCAA Northeast Regional Semifinals
2016–17	Harvard	28–6–2	16–4–2	t-1st	NCAA Frozen Four
2017–18	Harvard	15–14–4	11–8–3	4th	ECAC Semifinals
2018–19	Harvard	19–11–3	13–7–2	T–3rd	NCAA Northeast Regional Semifinals
2019–20	Harvard	15–10–6	11–6–5	5th	ECAC Quarterfinals
2021–22	Harvard	21–11–3	14–6–2	T–2nd	NCAA East Regional Semifinals
2022–23	Harvard	24–8–2	18–4–0	2nd	NCAA Northeast Regional Semifinals
2023–24	Harvard	7–19–6	6–10–6	8th	ECAC Quarterfinals
2024–25	Harvard	13–17–3	9–10–3	7th	ECAC Quarterfinals
2025–26	Harvard	16–16–2	11–10–1	6th	ECAC Quarterfinals
Harvard:		334–292–77	225–183–65		
Total:		334–292–77			
National champion Postseason invitational champion Conference regular season champion Conference regular season and conference tournament champion Division regular season champion Division regular season and conference tournament champion Conference tournament champion

== Awards and honors ==
Award	Year
All-NCAA All-Tournament team	1989
NCAA Tournament MVP	1989
All-ECAC Hockey First Team	1990–91

Awards and achievements
Preceded by Bruce Hoffort	NCAA Tournament Most Outstanding Player; 1989	Succeeded by Chris Tancill
