= 1973 ECAC Hockey men's ice hockey tournament =

1973 ECAC Men's ice hockey tournament
- Dates: March 6–10, 1973
- Teams: 8
- Finals site: Boston Garden; Boston, Massachusetts
- Champions: Cornell (5th title)
- Winning coach: Dick Bertrand (1st title)
- MVP: Carlo Ugolini (Cornell)
- ECAC Men's Ice Hockey Tournaments

The 1973 ECAC Hockey Men's Ice Hockey Tournament was the 12th tournament in league history. It was played between March 6 and March 10, 1973. Quarterfinal games were played at home team campus sites, while the 'final four' games were played at the Boston Garden in Boston, Massachusetts. By reaching the championship game both, Cornell and Boston College received invitations to participate in the 1973 NCAA University Division Men's Ice Hockey Tournament.

== Format ==
The tournament featured three rounds of play, all of which were single-elimination. The top eight teams, based on winning percentage, qualified to participate in the tournament. In the quarterfinals the first seed and eighth seed, the second seed and seventh seed, the third seed and sixth seed and the fourth seed and fifth seed played against one another. In the semifinals, the highest seed plays the lowest remaining seed while the two remaining teams play with the winners advancing to the championship game and the losers advancing to the third place game.

== Conference standings ==
Note: GP = Games played; W = Wins; L = Losses; T = Ties; Pct. = Winning percentage; GF = Goals for; GA = Goals against

1972–73 ECAC Hockey standings
	Conference							Overall					
	GP	W	L	T	Pct.	GF	GA	GP	W	L	T	GF	GA
Cornell†*	18	14	3	1	.806	81	60	29	23	5	1	156	92
Harvard†	18	14	3	1	.806	117	62	22	17	4	1	141	79
Boston College	19	13	5	1	.711	118	88	30	22	7	1	188	121
Pennsylvania	22	13	7	2	.636	90	78	27	16	9	2	115	97
New Hampshire	19	11	8	0	.579	93	87	29	16	10	3	129	121
Clarkson	20	11	9	0	.550	101	82	33	18	15	0	176	137
Rensselaer	20	11	9	0	.550	87	67	31	16	15	0	142	124
Boston University^	18	9	8	1	.528	100	51	29	11	17	1	174	86
Brown	19	10	9	0	.526	72	75	23	11	12	0	84	96
Northeastern	21	10	11	0	.476	93	98	29	17	12	0	144	125
St. Lawrence	18	8	10	0	.444	87	89	28	15	13	0	149	131
Dartmouth	20	8	11	1	.425	74	85	24	12	11	1	106	93
Yale	15	5	9	1	.367	47	69	23	12	10	1	102	89
Providence	17	6	11	0	.353	62	79	25	11	14	0	107	110
Colgate	17	5	12	0	.294	58	94	25	11	14	0	107	165
Princeton	21	3	18	0	.143	55	123	23	5	18	0	66	127
Army	10	1	9	0	.100	28	64	27	9	17	1	121	136
Championship: Cornell † indicates conference regular season champion * indicates conference tournament champion^ Boston University was required to forfeit 11 after the season for using an ineligible player

== Bracket ==
Teams are reseeded after the first round

Quarterfinals; March 6
1	Cornell	9
8	Rensselaer	3
2	Harvard	4
7	Clarkson	7
3	Boston College	4
6	New Hampshire	2
4	Boston University	3
5	Pennsylvania	7

Semifinals; March 9
1	Cornell	9
7	Clarkson	4
3	Boston College	5
5	Pennsylvania	3

Championship; March 10
1	Cornell	3
3	Boston College	2
Third Place
5	Pennsylvania	0
7	Clarkson	4

Note: * denotes overtime period(s)

=== Quarterfinals ===
==== (1) Cornell vs. (8) Rensselaer ====
March 6	Cornell	9 – 3	Rensselaer	Lynah Rink

==== (2) Harvard vs. (7) Clarkson ====
March 6	Harvard	4 – 7	Clarkson	Donald C. Watson Rink

==== (3) Boston College vs. (6) New Hampshire ====
March 6	Boston College	4 – 2	New Hampshire	McHugh Forum

==== (4) Boston University vs. (5) Pennsylvania ====
March 6	Boston University	3 – 7	Pennsylvania	Walter Brown Arena

=== Semifinals ===
==== (1) Cornell vs. (7) Clarkson ====
March 9	Cornell	9 – 4	Clarkson	Boston Garden

==== (3) Boston College vs. (5) Pennsylvania ====
March 9	Boston College	5 – 3	Pennsylvania	Boston Garden

=== Third Place ===
==== (5) Pennsylvania vs. (7) Clarkson ====
March 10	Pennsylvania	0 – 4	Clarkson	Boston Garden

=== Championship ===
==== (1) Cornell vs. (3) Boston College ====
March 10	Cornell	3 – 2	Boston College	Boston Garden

== Tournament awards ==
=== All-Tournament Team ===
None

=== MOP ===
- Carlo Ugolini (Cornell)
