= Bruce Major =

Canadian-born American businessman and ice hockey player

- Born: January 3, 1967 (age 59) Vernon, British Columbia, Canada
- Height: 6 ft 3 in (191 cm)
- Weight: 180 lb (82 kg; 12 st 12 lb)
- Position: Center
- Shot: Left
- Played for: Quebec Nordiques
- NHL draft: 99th Overall, 1985; Quebec Nordiques
- Playing career: 1985–1992

Bruce Alan Major (born January 3, 1967) is a Canadian-born American businessman and former ice hockey player. He played 4 games in the National Hockey League for the Quebec Nordiques during the 1990–91 season.

== Hockey career ==
Born in Vernon, British Columbia, Major was drafted by the Nordiques in the 1985 NHL entry draft with the 99th overall pick. However, he decided to play four years of college hockey for the University of Maine. After graduation he signed with the Nordiques, he spent most of his career in the minors but did play in four NHL games in 1990–91.

== Business career ==
Major is a Certified Public Accountant who currently resides in Topsfield, Massachusetts.

In 2006, he and former Cognos salesman Joseph Lally formed a business partnership called Montvale Solutions, which resold Cognos software. Lally later pleaded guilty to having paid kickbacks to Speaker of the Massachusetts House of Representatives Salvatore DiMasi. Major testified under immunity for the prosecution in DiMasi's corruption trial. In his testimony, Major stated that he told Lally he believed that some of the money paid to business consultants Richard McDonough and Richard Vitale was going back to DiMasi. Lally yelled at Major and told him "As far as you know, it's a payment to WN Advisors and that's it." He also testified that Lally "chastised" him for using DiMasi's name in an email and told him never to do it again. Major and Lally dissolved their partnership in late 2007.

== Career statistics ==
=== Regular season and playoffs ===
			Regular season					Playoffs
Season	Team	League	GP	G	A	Pts	PIM	GP	G	A	Pts	PIM
1983–84	Vernon Rockets	BCJHL	58	28	36	64	44	—	—	—	—	—
1984–85	Richmond Sockeyes	BCJHL	48	43	56	99	56	—	—	—	—	—
1985–86	University of Maine	HE	38	14	14	28	39	—	—	—	—	—
1986–87	University of Maine	HE	37	14	10	24	12	—	—	—	—	—
1987–88	University of Maine	HE	26	0	5	5	14	—	—	—	—	—
1988–89	University of Maine	HE	42	13	11	24	22	—	—	—	—	—
1989–90	Greensboro Monarchs	ECHL	12	4	3	7	6	10	2	2	4	12
1989–90	Halifax Citadels	AHL	32	5	6	11	23	—	—	—	—	—
1990–91	Quebec Nordiques	NHL	4	0	0	0	0	—	—	—	—	—
1990–91	Fort Wayne Komets	IHL	62	11	25	36	48	18	1	3	4	6
1990–91	Halifax Citadels	AHL	9	2	0	2	9	—	—	—	—	—
1991–92	Halifax Citadels	AHL	16	1	3	4	11	—	—	—	—	—
AHL totals			57	8	9	17	43	—	—	—	—	—
NHL totals			4	0	0	0	0	—	—	—	—	—
