= Paul Marshall (ice hockey, born 1966) =

American ice hockey player

- Born: October 22, 1966 (age 59) Quincy, Massachusetts, U.S.
- Height: 6 ft 2 in (188 cm)
- Weight: 185 lb (84 kg; 13 st 3 lb)
- Position: Defense
- Shot: Left
- Played for: Ilves; Albany Choppers; San Diego Gulls; Kalamazoo Wings; Dayton Bombers; Birmingham Bulls
- NHL draft: 84th overall, 1985; Philadelphia Flyers
- Playing career: 1989–1994

Paul Marshall (born October 22, 1966) is an American retired professional ice hockey defenseman who played in the Finnish Liiga, International Hockey League (IHL), and East Coast Hockey League (ECHL).

== Career ==
After four seasons at Boston College, where he was team captain his senior season, Marshall started his professional career in Finland with Ilves. He returned to North America after one season and played four more pro seasons in the IHL and ECHL. He was a Second Team All-Star during his final two seasons with the Birmingham Bulls; additionally during his time in Birmingham, Marshall helped to mentor future Pittsburgh Penguins head coach Dan Muse, via a Bulls youth hockey camp.

Marshall was drafted in the fourth round of the 1985 NHL entry draft by the Philadelphia Flyers.

== Career statistics ==
			Regular season					Playoffs
Season	Team	League	GP	G	A	Pts	PIM	GP	G	A	Pts	PIM
1985–86	Boston College Eagles	Hockey East	40	0	12	12	28	—	—	—	—	—
1986–87	Boston College Eagles	Hockey East	36	4	10	14	30	—	—	—	—	—
1987–88	Boston College Eagles	Hockey East	34	12	23	35	50	—	—	—	—	—
1988–89	Boston College Eagles	Hockey East	40	4	18	22	36	—	—	—	—	—
1989–90	Ilves	Liiga	31	1	20	21	14	8	2	0	2	0
1990–91	Albany Choppers	IHL	22	4	10	14	6	—	—	—	—	—
1990–91	San Diego Gulls	IHL	12	1	1	2	6	—	—	—	—	—
1991–92	Kalamazoo Wings	IHL	21	0	2	2	8	—	—	—	—	—
1991–92	Dayton Bombers	ECHL	36	19	29	48	32	3	1	3	4	20
1992–93	Birmingham Bulls	ECHL	62	21	56	77	109	—	—	—	—	—
1993–94	Birmingham Bulls	ECHL	68	13	67	80	100	10	1	8	9	24
Liiga totals			31	1	20	21	14	8	2	0	2	0
