= Kevin Sneddon =

Canadian American ice hockey coach (born 1970)

Current position
- Title: Head coach

Biographical details
- Born: April 24, 1970 (age 56); Burlington, Ontario, Canada

Playing career
- 1988–1992: Harvard
- Position: Defenseman

Coaching career (HC unless noted)
- 1993–1998: Union (assistant)
- 1998–2003: Union
- 2003–2020: Vermont

Head coaching record
- Overall: 301–400–102 (.438)
- Tournaments: 3-3

Accomplishments and honors

Awards
- 2008 Bob Kullen Coach of the Year

Kevin Sneddon (born April 24, 1970) is a Canadian American ice hockey coach. He is the former head coach of Vermont, a position he held from 2003 to 2020. He previously served as the head men's ice hockey coach at Union.

== Playing career ==
The son of former professional hockey player Bob Sneddon, who played for the California Golden Seals, Kevin Sneddon was raised in Burlington, Ontario, and attended Harvard where he was a four-year letterwinner under coaches Bill Cleary and Ronn Tomassoni. He was a freshman defenseman on the Crimson's 1989 national championship team, appearing in 32 games and registering six points. After the 1989 season, Sneddon was selected in the 12th round of the 1989 NHL Draft by the Los Angeles Kings. He continued his playing career at Harvard, captaining the team his senior season, amassing 23 points in his career.

== Coaching career ==
=== Union ===
After injuries sidelined a playing career, Sneddon began his coaching career, joining Union Bruce Delventhal's staff as an assistant in 1993. He also served as an assistant coach under Stan Moore for two seasons before assuming the role of head coach in 1998. As head coach at Union, Sneddon put together an overall record of 50-99-18, increasing the Skating Dutchmen's win record each season, capping it off at 14 wins in during the 2002-2003 season.

=== Vermont ===
On June 25, 2003 Sneddon was named the fourth head men's hockey coach in Vermont history, replacing the retiring Mike Gilligan. After a nine-win season in his first year at the helm of the Catamounts, Sneddon guided Vermont to the 2005 ECAC Hockey Tournament third-place game, losing to Colgate 2-1. The following season, Vermont became a member of Hockey East, and by 2008, the Catamounts third season in the league, UVM finished third in the conference and reached the 2008 Hockey East Tournament Championship, falling to Boston College Eagles men's ice hockey 4-0. A year later, with Hobey Baker Award finalist Viktor Stålberg, Sneddon led Vermont to a 22-12-5 record as the Catamounts made its fourth NCAA Tournament appearance, defeating Yale and Air Force in the East regional to reach the Frozen Four for the second time in school history, and first since 1996. The Catamounts were defeated by eventual national champion Boston University 5-4 in the national semifinal game.

Sneddon has since guided the Catamounts to NCAA Tournament appearances in 2010 and 2014, and also reached the Hockey East Championship semifinals in 2015. On February 5, 2020, Sneddon announced that he would retire and step down from his coaching position at Vermont after the conclusion of the 2019-20 season.

== Head coaching record ==
Record table
Season	Team	Overall	Conference	Standing	Postseason
Union Skating Dutchmen (ECAC Hockey) (1998–2002)
1998–99	Union	3–26–3	1–19–2	12th	
1999–00	Union	8–24–1	6–14–1	10th	ECAC quarterfinals
2000–01	Union	12–18–4	8–12–2	9th	ECAC quarterfinals
2001–02	Union	13–13–6	8–11–3	11th	
Union Dutchmen (ECAC Hockey) (2002–2003)
2002–03	Union	14–18–4	10–10–2	6th	ECAC quarterfinals
Union:		50–99–18 (.353)	33–66–10 (.349)		
Vermont Catamounts (ECAC Hockey) (2003–2005)
2003–04	Vermont	9–22–4	7–14–1	11th	ECAC quarterfinals
2004–05	Vermont	21–14–4	13–6–3	4th	ECAC semifinals
Vermont:		30–36–8	20–20–4		
Vermont Catamounts (Hockey East) (2005–2020)
2005–06	Vermont	18–14–6	10–11–6	6th	Hockey East Quarterfinals
2006–07	Vermont	18–16–5	12–10–5	T-5th	Hockey East Quarterfinals
2007–08	Vermont	17–15–7	13–9–5	3rd	Hockey East Finals
2008–09	Vermont	22–12–5	15–8–4	T-3rd	NCAA Frozen Four
2009–10	Vermont	17–15–7	9–11–7	8th	NCAA West Regional semifinals
2010–11	Vermont	8–20–8	6–14–7	7th	Hockey East Quarterfinals
2011–12	Vermont	6–27–1	3–23–1	10th	
2012–13	Vermont	11–19–6	8–13–6	7th	Hockey East Quarterfinals
2013–14	Vermont	20–15–2	10–10–0	7th	NCAA East Regional semifinals
2014–15	Vermont	22–15–4	10–9–3	7th	Hockey East Semifinals
2015–16	Vermont	15–22–3	6–13–3	9th	Hockey East Quarterfinals
2016–17	Vermont	20–13–5	10–8–4	6th	Hockey East Quarterfinals
2017–18	Vermont	10–20–7	6–12–6	9th	Hockey East Opening Round
2018–19	Vermont	12–19–3	5–16–3	10th	
2019–20	Vermont	5–23–6	2–18–4	11th	
Vermont:		221–265–76	125–186–64		
Total:		301–400–102 (.438)			
National champion Postseason invitational champion Conference regular season champion Conference regular season and conference tournament champion Division regular season champion Division regular season and conference tournament champion Conference tournament champion
