= Allain Roy =

Canadian ice hockey player

- Born: February 6, 1970 (age 56) Campbellton, New Brunswick, Canada
- Height: 5 ft 10 in (178 cm)
- Weight: 170 lb (77 kg; 12 st 2 lb)
- Position: Goaltender
- Caught: Right
- Played for: Jokerit (SM-liiga); Saginaw Wheels (CoHL); Kapfenberg EC (Austria)
- National team: Canada
- NHL draft: 69th overall, 1989; Winnipeg Jets
- Playing career: 1988–1996
Medal record
Men's Ice hockey
Silver medal – second place	1994 Lillehammer	Ice hockey

Allain Roland Roy (born February 6, 1970) is a Canadian former ice hockey goaltender.

== Career ==
Roy won a silver medal at the 1994 Winter Olympics. He went on to play professional roller hockey with the St. Louis Vipers in the RHI from 1994 to 1997.

Roy works as a player agent in St. Louis, Missouri.

== Awards and honors ==
Award	Year
All-ECAC Hockey Rookie Team	1988–89
All-NCAA All-Tournament Team	1989
