= Bill Cleary (ice hockey) =

American ice hockey player, coach, and athletic administrator

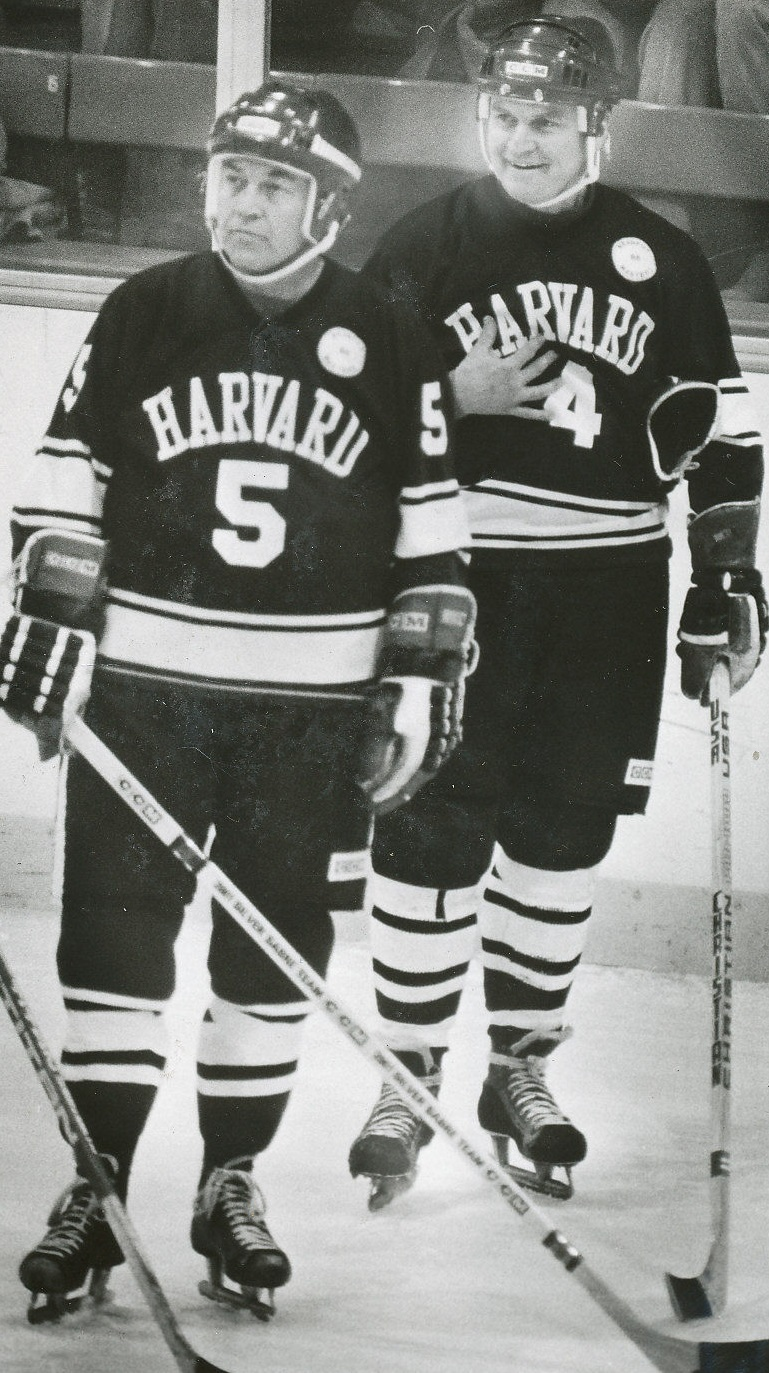
- Bill and Bob Cleary

Biographical details
- Born: August 19, 1934 (age 92); Cambridge, Massachusetts, U.S.

Playing career
- 1953–1955: Harvard
- 1956: US Olympic Team
- 1956–1957: US National Team
- 1958–1959: US National Team
- 1960: US Olympic Team
- Position: Center

Coaching career (HC unless noted)
- 1968–1969: Harvard (freshman)
- 1969–1971: Harvard (assistant)
- 1971–1990: Harvard

Administrative career (AD unless noted)
- 1990–2001: Harvard

Head coaching record
- Overall: 324–201–24

Accomplishments and honors

Championships
- 1973 ECAC Hockey Champion; 1975 ECAC Hockey Champion; 1982 ECAC Hockey Ivy Region Champion; 1983 ECAC Hockey Ivy Region Champion; 1983 ECAC Hockey Tournament Champion; 1984 ECAC Hockey Ivy Region Champion; 1986 ECAC Hockey Champion; 1987 ECAC Hockey Champion; 1987 ECAC Hockey Tournament Champion; 1988 ECAC Hockey Champion; 1989 ECAC Hockey Champion; 1989 NCAA National Championship

Awards
- 1976 US Hockey Hall of Fame; 1983 Spencer Penrose Award; 1988 ECAC Coach of the Year; 1989 US Olympic Hall of Fame (Team); 1993 Hobey Baker Legends of College Hockey; 1997 IIHF Hall of Fame; 1997 Lester Patrick Award
Medal record
Men's ice hockey
Representing the United States
Silver medal – second place	1956 Cortina d'Ampezzo	Team
Gold medal – first place	1960 Squaw Valley	Team

William John Cleary Jr. (born August 19, 1934) is an American former ice hockey player, coach, and athletic administrator. He is an alumnus of Belmont Hill School, played on the United States men's national ice hockey team that won the gold medal in ice hockey at the 1960 Winter Olympics, and was inducted into the International Ice Hockey Federation Hall of Fame in 1997.

== Career ==
=== Playing ===
Cleary was an All-American hockey player at Harvard, starring for two years and setting several team records (many of which still stand) along the way, including most goals in a game (6), longest goal-scoring streak (15), most goals in a season (42) and most points in a single season (89). Cleary's scoring prowess was instrumental in Harvard's invitation to the 1955 NCAA Tournament, the first in school history, and Cleary was named to the All-Tournament First Team after Harvard's third-place finish.

While at Harvard, Bill and his brother Bob played collegiate summer baseball together for the now defunct Sagamore Clouters of the Cape Cod Baseball League.

Taking a year away from college, he won a silver medal as a member of the U.S. ice hockey team at the 1956 Winter Olympics, after turning down a professional-contract offer from the National Hockey League's Montreal Canadiens and Boston Bruins (Cleary opted to go into the insurance business instead and made more money than he probably would have in the NHL). At the 1959 World Ice Hockey Championships, he won the IIHF directorate award for best forward. At the 1960 Winter Olympics, in Squaw Valley, California, Bill and his brother Bob teamed up to win a gold medal with the U.S., with Bill leading the team in scoring through the tournament with 14 points.

=== Coaching ===
After the 1960 Olympics Cleary retired as a player and became an ice hockey official for several years before returning to Harvard in 1968 to coach the freshman squad. Bill was quickly promoted to assistant coach of the varsity team and then became the head coach in 1971 when Cooney Weiland retired. Cleary's teams got off to a fast start with a top two finishing in each of his first four years. Though he couldn't manage to win a tournament in the time (conference or national) Cleary had established himself enough to carry through a down period in the late 1970s.

Harvard missed the postseason each year from 1977 to 1981, ending with a losing record in four of those seasons. There was a slight recovery in 1981–82 when Harvard won its division and was able to use it to propel itself into the ECAC title game and receive a subsequent invitation to the 1982 NCAA Tournament despite its rather bland record. The next season saw return to prominence for the Crimson as they won the ECAC Tournament and made the team's first National Title game, losing 6–2 to Wisconsin. For the stark turnaround not only did Cleary receive the Spencer Penrose Award but Mark Fusco was awarded the Hobey Baker Award.

After a brief dip in the standings for 1983–84, Harvard was a national contender for the remainder of the 1980s, winning at least 20 games each year from '85 to '89. Cleary won four consecutive ECAC regular season titles from '86 to '89 (one shared) and reached the National Championship for a second time in 1986, losing 6–5 to Michigan State. That season Cleary coached his second Hobey Baker winner, Scott Fusco, who remains the top career scorer in the history of the program. Three years later Harvard was once again in the title tilt, this time coming out on top with a 4–3 overtime win against Minnesota, garnering not only Harvard's first (and only) National Title, but their third Hobey Baker winner in Lane MacDonald (the team's all-time goal scoring leader).

Cleary coached the Crimson for one more season before moving on to become an administrator for Harvard's athletic department and formally retired on June 30, 2001.

== Awards and honors ==
Award	Year
AHCA First Team All-American	1954–55
NCAA All-Tournament First Team	1955
IIHF World Championship best forward	1959
IIHF Hall of Fame inductee	1997

Among many of the honors he has received include being named to the NCAA Ice Hockey 50th Anniversary team, chosen as the US Hockey Player of the Decade (1956–1966), tabbed as one of the 100 Golden Olympians by the USOC as well as being named the 33rd-best Massachusetts athlete in the 20th century by Sports Illustrated and #68 on the Boston Globe's top 100 New England athletes of the 20th century. Additionally Cleary is the only person in the history of Harvard University's athletic department to have his jersey number (4) retired. Cleary's three Hobey Baker winners ties him for having coached the most players ever with Mike Sertich and Doug Woog.

Cleary was the driving force behind the structure of ECAC Hockey and a mentor to several successful college coaches, including 1987 CCHA Coach of the Year Val Belmonte. The Cleary Cup, named in his honor in 2001, is awarded to the ECAC's regular-season champion.

Cleary was Ryan O'Neal's stand-in for key ice hockey action scenes in the 1970 film, Love Story, which was about a Harvard hockey player protagonist.

== Head coaching record ==
Record table
Season	Team	Overall	Conference	Standing	Postseason
Harvard Crimson (ECAC Hockey) (1971–1990)
1971–72	Harvard	17–8–1	16–4–1	2nd	ECAC Third Place Game (Loss)
1972–73	Harvard	17–4–1	14–3–1	t-1st	ECAC Quarterfinals
1973–74	Harvard	17–11–1	15–6–0	2nd	NCAA Consolation Game (Loss)
1974–75	Harvard	23–6–0	19–1–0	1st	NCAA Consolation Game (Loss)
1975–76	Harvard	13–10–3	10–7–3	7th	ECAC Third Place Game (Loss)
1976–77	Harvard	14–12–0	12–10–0	9th	
1977–78	Harvard	12–14–0	10–13–0	10th	
1978–79	Harvard	7–18–1	5–16–1	14th	
1979–80	Harvard	8–15–5	7–11–3	12th	
1980–81	Harvard	11–14–1	8–12–1	14th	
1981–82	Harvard	13–15–2	11–8–2	8th	NCAA Quarterfinals
1982–83	Harvard	23–9–2	15–5–1	t-2nd	NCAA Runner-Up
1983–84	Harvard	10–14–3	10–9–1	8th	ECAC Quarterfinals
1984–85	Harvard	21–9–2	15–5–1	2nd	NCAA Quarterfinals
1985–86	Harvard	25–8–1	18–3–0	1st	NCAA Runner-Up
1986–87	Harvard	28–6–0	20–2–0	1st	NCAA Consolation Game (Loss)
1987–88	Harvard	21–11–0	18–4–0	t-1st	NCAA West Regional Quarterfinals
1988–89	Harvard	31–3–0	21–2–0	1st	NCAA National Champion
1989–90	Harvard	13–14–1	12–9–1	6th	ECAC Quarterfinals
Harvard:		324–201–24	256–130–16		
Total:		324–201–24			
National champion Postseason invitational champion Conference regular season champion Conference regular season and conference tournament champion Division regular season champion Division regular season and conference tournament champion Conference tournament champion

Awards and achievements
Preceded by John Mayasich	NCAA Ice Hockey Scoring Champion; 1954–55	Succeeded by Ed Rowe
Preceded by Fern Flaman	Spencer Penrose Award; 1982–83	Succeeded by Mike Sertich
Preceded by Tim Taylor	Tim Taylor Award; 1987–88; With: Mike Gilligan	Succeeded by Joe Marsh
Preceded by John "Connie" Pleban	Hobey Baker Legends of College Hockey Award; 1993	Succeeded by Jack Kelley
Sporting positions
Preceded by Jack Garrity	NCAA Single-Season Points Leader; 1955–1959	Succeeded by Phil Latreille
