= Peter Ciavaglia =

American ice hockey player (born 1969)

- Born: July 15, 1969 (age 56) Albany, New York, U.S.
- Height: 5 ft 10 in (178 cm)
- Weight: 180 lb (82 kg; 12 st 12 lb)
- Position: Center
- Shot: Left
- Played for: Buffalo Sabres; Leksands IF
- National team: United States
- NHL draft: 145th overall, 1987; Calgary Flames
- Playing career: 1991–2000

Peter Anthony Ciavaglia (born July 15, 1969) is an American former professional ice hockey center. After graduating from Nichols School in Buffalo in 1987, Peter was selected in that year's NHL entry draft by the Calgary Flames. Deciding to take the college route, he played four seasons at Harvard University, where he was part of the 1989 national championship team, and eventually played in five games in the National Hockey League with the Buffalo Sabres between 1991 and 1993. He spent most of his professional career, which lasted from 1991 to 2000, in the International Hockey League with the Detroit Vipers.

== Awards and honors ==
Award	Year
All-ECAC Hockey Rookie Team	1987–88
ECAC Hockey All-Tournament Team	1988
All-ECAC Hockey Second Team	1988–89
All-ECAC Hockey First Team	1990–91
AHCA East Second-Team All-American	1990–91

== Career statistics ==
=== Regular season and playoffs ===
			Regular season					Playoffs
Season	Team	League	GP	G	A	Pts	PIM	GP	G	A	Pts	PIM
1985–86	Nichols School	CISAA	60	84	113	197	—	—	—	—	—	—
1986–87	Nichols School	CISAA	58	53	84	137	—	—	—	—	—	—
1987–88	Harvard University	ECAC	30	10	23	33	16	—	—	—	—	—
1988–89	Harvard University	ECAC	34	15	48	63	36	—	—	—	—	—
1989–90	Harvard University	ECAC	28	17	18	35	22	—	—	—	—	—
1990–91	Harvard University	ECAC	28	24	39	63	4	—	—	—	—	—
1991–92	Buffalo Sabres	NHL	2	0	0	0	0	—	—	—	—	—
1991–92	Rochester Americans	AHL	77	37	61	98	16	6	2	5	7	6
1992–93	Buffalo Sabres	NHL	3	0	0	0	0	—	—	—	—	—
1992–93	Rochester Americans	AHL	64	35	67	102	32	17	9	16	25	12
1993–94	United States National Team	Intl	18	2	9	11	6	—	—	—	—	—
1993–94	Leksands IF	SEL	39	14	18	32	34	4	1	1	2	0
1994–95	Detroit Vipers	IHL	73	22	59	81	83	5	1	1	2	6
1995–96	Detroit Vipers	IHL	75	22	56	78	38	12	6	11	17	12
1996–97	Detroit Vipers	IHL	72	21	51	72	54	21	14	19	33	32
1997–98	Detroit Vipers	IHL	35	11	30	41	10	23	8	11	19	12
1998–99	Detroit Vipers	IHL	59	27	31	58	33	11	1	8	9	10
1999–00	Detroit Vipers	IHL	41	5	22	27	14	—	—	—	—	—
IHL totals			355	108	249	357	232	72	30	50	80	72
NHL totals			5	0	0	0	0	—	—	—	—	—

=== International ===
Year	Team	Event	GP	G	A	Pts	PIM
1989	United States	WJC	7	1	4	5	0
1994	United States	OLY	8	2	4	6	0
1994	United States	WC	7	1	0	1	2
Senior totals			15	3	4	7	2

Awards and achievements
Preceded by Dave Gagnon	ECAC Hockey Player of the Year; 1990–91	Succeeded by Daniel Laperrière
