= Allen Bourbeau =

American former ice hockey player

- Born: May 17, 1965 (age 60) Worcester, Massachusetts, U.S.
- Height: 5 ft 9 in (175 cm)
- Weight: 174 lb (79 kg; 12 st 6 lb)
- Position: Center
- Shot: Right
- National team: United States
- NHL draft: 81st overall, 1983; Philadelphia Flyers
- Playing career: 1988–1990

Allen Harold Bourbeau (born May 17, 1965) is an American former ice hockey player. He played for Acton Boxborough HS in Mass and was the leading scorer in Mass HS hockey at the time of his graduation. He went on to star at Harvard University. He was selected by the Philadelphia Flyers in the 4th round (81st overall) of the 1983 NHL entry draft.

Bourbeau played with Team USA at the 1988 Winter Olympics.

== Awards and honors ==
Award	Year
All-NCAA All-Tournament Team	1986
All-ECAC Hockey Second Team	1988–89

== Career statistics ==
=== Regular season and playoffs ===
			Regular season					Playoffs
Season	Team	League	GP	G	A	Pts	PIM	GP	G	A	Pts	PIM
1979–80	Acton-Boxborough Regional High School	HSMA						—	—	—	—	—
1980–81	Acton-Boxborough Regional High School	HSMA						—	—	—	—	—
1981–82	Acton-Boxborough Regional High School	HSMA						—	—	—	—	—
1982–83	Acton-Boxborough Regional High School	HSMA	22	62	40	102		—	—	—	—	—
1984–85	Aurora Tigers	OPJHL	25	29	41	70	20	—	—	—	—	—
1985–86	Harvard University	ECAC	25	24	19	43	26	—	—	—	—	—
1986–87	Harvard University	ECAC	33	23	34	57	46	—	—	—	—	—
1987–88	United States National Team	Intl						—	—	—	—	—
1988–89	Harvard University	ECAC	33	11	43	54	48	—	—	—	—	—
ECAC totals			91	58	96	154	120	—	—	—	—	—

=== International ===
Year	Team	Event	GP	G	A	Pts	PIM
1984	United States	WJC	7	4	4	8	8
1985	United States	WJC	7	4	1	5	18
1988	United States	OG	6	3	1	4	2
Junior totals			14	8	5	13	26
Senior totals			6	3	1	4	2
