= Lane MacDonald =

American ice hockey player (born 1966)

- Born: March 3, 1966 (age 60) Tulsa, Oklahoma, U.S.
- Height: 5 ft 11 in (180 cm)
- Weight: 187 lb (85 kg; 13 st 5 lb)
- Position: Left wing
- Shot: Left
- Played for: HC Lugano
- National team: United States
- NHL draft: 59th overall, 1985; Calgary Flames
- Playing career: 1989–1990

Bradley Lane MacDonald (born March 3, 1966) is an American former ice hockey player.

== Playing career ==
Born in Tulsa to father, former NHL player Lowell MacDonald, MacDonald was a prep star at the University School of Milwaukee, and grew up in Pittsburgh, Pennsylvania. Drafted by the Calgary Flames, MacDonald chose to attend Harvard University, where he graduated with four school scoring records (including career goals), and ranking in the top five in 11 different statistical categories; he studied philosophy under the tutelage of Alexander George. He was twice named a first-team All-American.

MacDonald was a member of the bronze-medal winning American team at the 1986 World Junior Hockey Championship. He took a year off from Harvard in 1987-88 to play member of the United States' 1988 Winter Olympics team in Calgary. MacDonald would return to Harvard as team captain to win the 1989 Hobey Baker Award, given to the top collegiate ice hockey player, while at Harvard University, and leading the Crimson to the NCAA Championship. After college, he played for HC Lugano is the Swiss League before recurring migraine headaches forced him to retire. He attempted a brief comeback with the 1992 US hockey team in preparation for the Albertville Olympics, but left competitive hockey for good prior to the Winter Games. He then went to Stanford Business School and is now a general partner in a Boston-area private equity firm, where he lives with his wife and three children.

MacDonald was inducted into the United States Hockey Hall of Fame in 2005.

== Career statistics ==
=== Regular season and playoffs ===
			Regular season					Playoffs
Season	Team	League	GP	G	A	Pts	PIM	GP	G	A	Pts	PIM
1983–84	University School of Milwaukee	HS-WI	—	—	—	—	—	—	—	—	—	—
1984–85	Harvard University	ECAC	32	21	31	52	30	—	—	—	—	—
1985–86	Harvard University	ECAC	30	22	24	46	45	—	—	—	—	—
1986–87	Harvard University	ECAC	34	37	30	67	26	—	—	—	—	—
1988–89	Harvard University	ECAC	32	31	29	60	42	—	—	—	—	—
1989–90	HC Lugano	NDA	22	15	13	28	4	—	—	—	—	—
ECAC totals			128	111	114	225	143	—	—	—	—	—

=== International ===
Year	Team	Event	GP	G	A	Pts	PIM
1986	United States	WJC	7	1	5	6	0
1987	United States	WC	2	0	0	0	0
1988	United States	OG	6	6	1	7	4
Senior totals			8	6	1	7	4

== Awards and honors ==
Award	Year	Ref
All-ECAC Hockey First Team	1986–87	
AHCA East First-Team All-American	1986–87	
All-ECAC Hockey First Team	1988–89	
AHCA East First-Team All-American	1988–89	
ECAC Hockey All-Tournament Team	1989	
All-NCAA All-Tournament Team	1989	
Hobey Baker Award	1989	

Awards and achievements
Preceded by Doug Dadswell	ECAC Hockey Most Outstanding Player in Tournament; 1987	Succeeded by Pete Lappin
Preceded by Pete Lappin	ECAC Hockey Player of the Year; 1988–89	Succeeded by Dave Gagnon
Preceded by Robb Stauber	Winner of the Hobey Baker Award; 1988–89	Succeeded by Kip Miller
