= List of Colgate Raiders men's ice hockey seasons =

This is a season-by-season list of records compiled by Colgate in men's ice hockey.

Colgate University has made five appearances in the NCAA Tournament, making the Frozen Four and championship game once.

== Season-by-season results ==
Note: GP = Games played, W = Wins, L = Losses, T = Ties

| NCAA D-I Champions | NCAA Frozen Four | Conference regular season champions | Conference Playoff Champions |

| Season | Conference | Regular Season (Note: Code explanation; GP—Games Played, W—Wins, L—Losses, T—Tied games, OTW—Overtime Wins, OTL—Overtime Loses, 3/SW—Win in 3 on 3 overtime or shootout, Pts—Points*) | | | | | | | | | | | | | | Conference Tournament Results | National Tournament Results |
| Season | Conference | Conference | | | | | | | | | Overall | | | | | Conference Tournament Results | National Tournament Results |
| Season | Conference | GP | W | L | T | OTW | OTL | 3/SW | Pts* | Finish | GP | W | L | T | % | Conference Tournament Results | National Tournament Results |
|---|---|---|---|---|---|---|---|---|---|---|---|---|---|---|---|---|---|
No Coach (1915 — 1917)
| 1915–16 | Independent | – | – | – | – | – | – | – | – | – | 1 | 1 | 0 | 0 | 1.000 | | |
| 1916–17 | Independent | – | – | – | – | – | – | – | – | – | 3 | 2 | 1 | 0 | .667 | | |
Program suspended due to World War I
James Ballantine (1920 — 1922)
| 1920–21 | Independent | – | – | – | – | – | – | – | – | – | 5 | 2 | 3 | 0 | .400 | | |
| 1921–22 | Independent | – | – | – | – | – | – | – | – | – | 4 | 0 | 4 | 0 | .000 | | |
Program suspended
James Ballantine (1927 — 1928)
| 1927–28 | Independent | – | – | – | – | – | – | – | – | – | 4 | 0 | 4 | 0 | .000 | | |
Ray Watkins (1928 — 1932)
| 1928–29 | Independent | – | – | – | – | – | – | – | – | – | 7 | 4 | 3 | 0 | .571 | | |
| 1929–30 | Independent | – | – | – | – | – | – | – | – | – | 6 | 1 | 4 | 1 | .250 | | |
| 1930–31 | Independent | – | – | – | – | – | – | – | – | – | 3 | 1 | 2 | 0 | .333 | | |
| 1931–32 | Independent | – | – | – | – | – | – | – | – | – | 2 | 0 | 2 | 0 | .000 | | |
John Howard Starr (1932 — 1942)
| 1932–33 | Independent | – | – | – | – | – | – | – | – | – | 7 | 3 | 4 | 0 | .429 | | |
| 1933–34 | Independent | – | – | – | – | – | – | – | – | – | 11 | 1 | 9 | 1 | .136 | | |
| 1934–35 | Independent | – | – | – | – | – | – | – | – | – | 15 | 4 | 11 | 0 | .267 | | |
| 1935–36 | Independent | – | – | – | – | – | – | – | – | – | 14 | 3 | 10 | 1 | .250 | | |
| 1936–37 | Independent | – | – | – | – | – | – | – | – | – | 7 | 4 | 3 | 0 | .571 | | |
| 1937–38 | Independent | – | – | – | – | – | – | – | – | – | 7 | 3 | 4 | 0 | .428 | | |
| 1938–39 | Independent | – | – | – | – | – | – | – | – | – | 9 | 8 | 1 | 0 | .889 | | |
| 1939–40 | Independent | – | – | – | – | – | – | – | – | – | 13 | 9 | 4 | 0 | .692 | | |
| 1940–41 | Independent | – | – | – | – | – | – | – | – | – | 11 | 6 | 5 | 0 | .545 | | |
| 1941–42 | Independent | – | – | – | – | – | – | – | – | – | 13 | 10 | 3 | 0 | .769 | | |
Gregory Batt (1942 — 1943)
| 1942–43 | Independent | – | – | – | – | – | – | – | – | – | 11 | 11 | 0 | 0 | 1.000 | | |
Albert Prettyman (1943 — 1944)
| 1943–44 | Independent | – | – | – | – | – | – | – | – | – | 6 | 4 | 2 | 0 | .667 | | |
Program suspended due to World War II
John Howard Starr (1945 — 1950)
| 1945–46 | Independent | – | – | – | – | – | – | – | – | – | 8 | 2 | 6 | 0 | .250 | | |
| 1946–47 | Independent | – | – | – | – | – | – | – | – | – | 14 | 14 | 0 | 0 | 1.000 | | |
| 1947–48 | Independent | – | – | – | – | – | – | – | – | – | 12 | 8 | 4 | 0 | .667 | | |
| 1948–49 | Independent | – | – | – | – | – | – | – | – | – | 9 | 5 | 3 | 1 | .611 | | |
| 1949–50 | Independent | – | – | – | – | – | – | – | – | – | 15 | 7 | 7 | 1 | .500 | | |
Tom Dockrell (1950 — 1951)
| 1950–51 | Tri-State League | 5 | 1 | 4 | 0 | – | – | – | 2 | T–5th | 9 | 2 | 7 | 0 | .222 | | |
Program suspended due to lack of ice
Olav Kollevoll (1957 — 1965)
| 1957–58 | Independent | – | – | – | – | – | – | – | – | – | 4 | 2 | 2 | 0 | .500 | | |
| 1958–59 | Independent | – | – | – | – | – | – | – | – | – | 8 | 2 | 6 | 0 | .250 | | |
| 1959–60 | Independent | – | – | – | – | – | – | – | – | – | 15 | 5 | 10 | 0 | .333 | | |
| 1960–61 | Independent | – | – | – | – | – | – | – | – | – | 24 | 8 | 15 | 1 | .354 | | |
| 1961–62 | ECAC Hockey | 24 | 18 | 6 | 0 | – | – | – | .750 | T–6th | 24 | 18 | 6 | 0 | .750 | | |
| 1962–63 | ECAC Hockey | 16 | 11 | 4 | 1 | – | – | – | .719 | 7th | 22 | 16 | 5 | 1 | .750 | Lost Quarterfinal, 3–5 (Harvard) | |
| 1963–64 | ECAC Hockey | 21 | 15 | 6 | 0 | – | – | – | .714 | T–3rd | 27 | 19 | 8 | 0 | .703 | Lost Quarterfinal, 2–3 (Providence) | |
University Division
| 1964–65 | ECAC Hockey | 14 | 4 | 10 | 0 | – | – | – | .286 | 13th | 25 | 11 | 14 | 0 | .440 | | |
Ron Ryan (1965 — 1972)
| 1965–66 | ECAC Hockey | 16 | 8 | 7 | 1 | – | – | – | .531 | 7th | 26 | 14 | 11 | 1 | .558 | Lost Quarterfinal, 2–5 (Clarkson) | |
| 1966–67 | ECAC Hockey | 16 | 5 | 11 | 0 | – | – | – | .313 | 12th | 26 | 11 | 15 | 0 | .423 | | |
| 1967–68 | ECAC Hockey | 17 | 9 | 8 | 0 | – | – | – | .529 | 10th | 23 | 12 | 11 | 0 | .521 | Lost Quarterfinal, 2–5 (Clarkson) | |
| 1968–69 | ECAC Hockey | 16 | 6 | 10 | 0 | – | – | – | .375 | 12th | 25 | 12 | 13 | 0 | .480 | | |
| 1969–70 | ECAC Hockey | 17 | 7 | 7 | 3 | – | – | – | .500 | 8th | 24 | 14 | 7 | 3 | .646 | | |
| 1970–71 | ECAC Hockey | 17 | 4 | 13 | 0 | – | – | – | .235 | 15th | 24 | 7 | 17 | 0 | .292 | | |
| 1971–72 | ECAC Hockey | 19 | 5 | 14 | 0 | – | – | – | .263 | T–14th | 26 | 8 | 18 | 0 | .308 | | |
Brad Houston (1972 — 1975)
| 1972–73 | ECAC Hockey | 17 | 5 | 12 | 0 | – | – | – | .294 | 15th | 25 | 11 | 14 | 0 | .440 | | |
Division I
| 1973–74 | ECAC Hockey | 20 | 5 | 14 | 1 | – | – | – | .275 | 16th | 28 | 11 | 16 | 1 | .410 | | |
| 1974–75 | ECAC Hockey | 22 | 5 | 17 | 0 | – | – | – | .227 | 15th | 27 | 10 | 17 | 0 | .370 | | |
Jim Higgins (1975 — 1977)
| 1975–76 | ECAC Hockey | 20 | 6 | 14 | 0 | – | – | – | .300 | 13th | 25 | 9 | 16 | 0 | .360 | | |
| 1976–77 | ECAC Hockey | 24 | 10 | 14 | 0 | – | – | – | .417 | 12th | 28 | 12 | 16 | 0 | .428 | | |
Terry Slater (1977 — 1991)
| 1977–78 | ECAC Hockey | 25 | 4 | 20 | 1 | – | – | – | .180 | 17th | 28 | 5 | 22 | 1 | .196 | | |
| 1978–79 | ECAC Hockey | 20 | 7 | 13 | 0 | – | – | – | .350 | 12th | 28 | 15 | 13 | 0 | .535 | | |
| 1979–80 | ECAC Hockey | 21 | 10 | 10 | 1 | – | – | – | .500 | T–7th | 31 | 18 | 12 | 1 | .596 | Lost Quarterfinal, 3–8 (Providence) | |
| 1980–81 | ECAC Hockey | 20 | 12 | 7 | 1 | – | – | – | .625 | 3rd | 35 | 21 | 12 | 2 | .628 | Won Quarterfinal, 5–3 (Northeastern); Lost Semifinal, 3–4 (Cornell); Tied Third-place game, 3–3 (Clarkson) | Lost Quarterfinal series, 8–14 (Minnesota) |
| 1981–82 | ECAC Hockey | 20 | 11 | 8 | 1 | – | – | – | .575 | 8th | 30 | 19 | 10 | 1 | .650 | Lost Quarterfinal, 4–7 (Clarkson) | |
| 1982–83 | ECAC Hockey | 20 | 9 | 9 | 2 | – | – | – | .500 | 10th | 28 | 15 | 10 | 3 | .589 | | |
| 1983–84 | ECAC Hockey | 20 | 10 | 9 | 1 | – | – | – | .525 | 7th | 35 | 20 | 14 | 1 | .586 | Lost Quarterfinal series, 0–2 (Rensselaer) | |
| 1984–85 | ECAC Hockey | 21 | 9 | 12 | 0 | – | – | – | 18 | 7th | 32 | 14 | 18 | 0 | .438 | Lost Quarterfinal series, 0–2 (Harvard) | |
| 1985–86 | ECAC Hockey | 21 | 9 | 11 | 1 | – | – | – | 19 | 8th | 32 | 15 | 15 | 2 | .500 | Lost Quarterfinal series, 0–2 (Harvard) | |
| 1986–87 | ECAC Hockey | 22 | 15 | 6 | 1 | – | – | – | 31 | 2nd | 33 | 23 | 9 | 1 | .712 | Lost Quarterfinal series, 1–2 (Rensselaer) | |
| 1987–88 | ECAC Hockey | 22 | 13 | 8 | 1 | – | – | – | 27 | 5th | 32 | 18 | 11 | 3 | .609 | Lost Quarterfinal series, 0–1–1 (Vermont) | |
| 1988–89 | ECAC Hockey | 22 | 15 | 6 | 1 | – | – | – | 31 | 3rd | 31 | 19 | 10 | 2 | .645 | Lost Quarterfinal series, 0–1–1 (Vermont) | |
| 1989–90 | ECAC Hockey | 22 | 18 | 3 | 1 | – | – | – | 37 | 1st | 38 | 31 | 6 | 1 | .829 | Won Quarterfinal series, 2–0 (Yale); Won Semifinal, 5–3 (Clarkson); Won Championship, 5–4 (Rensselaer) | Won Quarterfinal series, 2–0 (Lake Superior State); Won Semifinal, 3–2 (Boston University); Lost Championship, 3–7 (Wisconsin) |
| 1990–91 | ECAC Hockey | 22 | 9 | 9 | 4 | – | – | – | 22 | 7th | 32 | 16 | 12 | 4 | .563 | Lost Quarterfinal series, 0–2 (Cornell) | |
Brian Durocher (1991 — 1992)
| 1991–92 | ECAC Hockey | 22 | 11† | 11† | 0† | – | – | – | 22† | 8th | 31 | 14† | 16† | 1† | .468 | Lost Preliminary, 4–5 (Princeton) | |
Don Vaughan (1992 — 2003)
| 1992–93 | ECAC Hockey | 22 | 9 | 13 | 0 | – | – | – | 18 | T–8th | 34 | 13 | 18 | 3 | .426 | Won Preliminary, 4–3 (Dartmouth); Lost Quarterfinal series, 1–2 (Rensselaer) | |
| 1993–94 | ECAC Hockey | 22 | 10 | 10 | 2 | – | – | – | 22 | 7th | 33 | 14 | 17 | 2 | .455 | Won Preliminary, 4–3 (St. Lawrence); Lost Quarterfinal series, 0–2 (Clarkson) | |
| 1994–95 | ECAC Hockey | 22 | 12 | 9 | 1 | – | – | – | 25 | T–3rd | 37 | 20 | 16 | 1 | .554 | Won Quarterfinal series, 2–1 (Vermont); Lost Semifinal, 1–2 (Rensselaer); Lost Third-place game, 5–10 (Clarkson) | |
| 1995–96 | ECAC Hockey | 22 | 13 | 5 | 4 | – | – | – | 31 | 5th | 34 | 17 | 13 | 4 | .559 | Lost Quarterfinal series, 0–2 (Cornell) | |
| 1996–97 | ECAC Hockey | 22 | 10 | 9 | 3 | – | – | – | 23 | 7th | 33 | 16 | 14 | 3 | .530 | Lost Preliminary, 0–1 (Yale) | |
| 1997–98 | ECAC Hockey | 22 | 9 | 10 | 3 | – | – | – | 21 | T–5th | 35 | 16 | 15 | 4 | .514 | Lost First Round series, 0–2 (Harvard) | |
| 1998–99 | ECAC Hockey | 22 | 12 | 8 | 2 | – | – | – | 26 | T–5th | 35 | 19 | 12 | 4 | .600 | Won First Round series, 2–0 (Yale); Lost Four vs. Five, 2–3 (Princeton) | |
| 1999–00 | ECAC Hockey | 20 | 14 | 4 | 2 | – | – | – | 30 | 2nd | 35 | 24 | 9 | 2 | .714 | Won First Round series, 2–0 (Yale); Lost Semifinal, 1–3 (Rensselaer); Won Third-place game, 4–0 (Cornell) | Lost Regional Quareterfinal, 3–4 (Michigan) |
| 2000–01 | ECAC Hockey | 22 | 8 | 13 | 1 | – | – | – | 17 | 11th | 34 | 10 | 20 | 4 | .353 | | |
| 2001–02 | ECAC Hockey | 22 | 10 | 10 | 2 | – | – | – | 22 | T–6th | 34 | 13 | 19 | 2 | .412 | Lost First Round series, 0–2 (Dartmouth) | |
| 2002–03 | ECAC Hockey | 22 | 9 | 10 | 3 | – | – | – | 21 | T–7th | 40 | 17 | 19 | 4 | .475 | Won First Round series, 2–1 (St. Lawrence); Lost Quarterfinal series, 1–2 (Dartmouth) | |
Stan Moore (2003 — 2004)
| 2003–04 | ECAC Hockey | 22 | 14 | 6 | 2 | – | – | – | 30 | 1st | 39 | 22 | 12 | 5 | .628 | Won First Round series, 2–1 (St. Lawrence); Lost Semifinal, 1–2 (Clarkson); Won Third-place game, 3–2 (Dartmouth) | |
Don Vaughan (2004 — 2023)
| 2004–05 | ECAC Hockey | 22 | 14 | 5 | 3 | – | – | – | 31 | 3rd | 39 | 25 | 11 | 3 | .679 | Won First Round series, 2–0 (Brown); Lost Semifinal, 3–4 (Harvard); Won Third-place game, 2–1 (Vermont) | Lost Regional Semifinal, 5–6 (Colorado College) |
| 2005–06 | ECAC Hockey | 22 | 14 | 6 | 2 | – | – | – | 29 | T–1st | 39 | 20 | 13 | 6 | .513 | Won First Round series, 2–1 (Quinnipiac); Lost Semifinal, 0–2 (Cornell); Lost Third-place game, 2–3 (Dartmouth) | |
| 2006–07 | ECAC Hockey | 22 | 7 | 12 | 3 | – | – | – | 17 | T–8th | 40 | 15 | 21 | 4 | .425 | Won First Round series, 2–0 (Rensselaer); Lost Quarterfinal series, 0–2 (St. Lawrence) | |
| 2007–08 | ECAC Hockey | 22 | 8 | 9 | 5 | – | – | – | 21 | 8th | 42 | 18 | 18 | 6 | .500 | Won First Round series, 2–1 (St. Lawrence); Won Quarterfinal series, 2–1 (Clarkson); Lost Semifinal, 0–3 (Princeton); Lost Third-place game, 2–4 (Cornell) | |
| 2008–09 | ECAC Hockey | 22 | 6 | 11 | 5 | – | – | – | 17 | 10th | 37 | 12 | 18 | 7 | .418 | Lost First Round series, 1–2 (Quinnipiac) | |
| 2009–10 | ECAC Hockey | 22 | 12 | 8 | 2 | – | – | – | 26 | 12th | 36 | 15 | 15 | 6 | .500 | Lost First Round series, 0–2 (St. Lawrence) | |
| 2010–11 | ECAC Hockey | 22 | 4 | 15 | 3 | – | – | – | 11 | 12th | 42 | 11 | 28 | 3 | .297 | Won First Round series, 2–1 (Rensselaer); Won Quarterfinal series, 2–1 (Union); Lost Semifinal, 0–4 (Yale); Lost Third-place game, 3–5 (Dartmouth) | |
| 2011–12 | ECAC Hockey | 22 | 11 | 10 | 1 | – | – | – | 23 | T–4th | 39 | 19 | 17 | 3 | .525 | Won Quarterfinal series, 2–1 (Quinnipiac); Lost Semifinal, 2–6 (Union); Lost Third-place game, 0–3 (Cornell) | |
| 2012–13 | ECAC Hockey | 22 | 6 | 13 | 3 | – | – | – | 15 | 11th | 36 | 14 | 18 | 4 | .444 | Lost First Round series, 0–2 (St. Lawrence) | |
| 2013–14 | ECAC Hockey | 22 | 13 | 6 | 3 | – | – | – | 29 | 2nd | 39 | 20 | 14 | 5 | .577 | Won Quarterfinal series, 2–0 (St. Lawrence); Won Semifinal, 3–2 (Quinnipiac); Lost Championship, 2–5 (Union) | Lost Regional Semifinal, 0–1 (Ferris State) |
| 2014–15 | ECAC Hockey | 22 | 11 | 7 | 4 | – | – | – | 26 | T–4th | 38 | 22 | 12 | 4 | .631 | Won Quarterfinal series, 2–0 (Dartmouth); Won Semifinal, 4–3 (St. Lawrence); Lost Championship, 2–4 (Harvard) | |
| 2015–16 | ECAC Hockey | 22 | 6 | 14 | 2 | – | – | – | 14 | 10th | 37 | 11 | 24 | 2 | .324 | Lost First Round series, 1–2 (Dartmouth) | |
| 2016–17 | ECAC Hockey | 22 | 6 | 13 | 3 | – | – | – | 15 | 10th | 37 | 9 | 22 | 6 | .324 | Lost First Round series, 1–2 (Princeton) | |
| 2017–18 | ECAC Hockey | 22 | 10 | 9 | 3 | – | – | – | 23 | T–5th | 40 | 17 | 17 | 6 | .500 | Won First Round series, 2–1 (Rensselaer); Lost Quarterfinal series, 1–2 (Clarkson) | |
| 2018–19 | ECAC Hockey | 22 | 7 | 12 | 3 | – | – | – | 17 | 10th | 36 | 10 | 23 | 3 | .319 | Lost First Round series, 0–2 (Union) | |
| 2019–20 | ECAC Hockey | 22 | 8 | 9 | 5 | – | – | – | 21 | 8th | 36 | 12 | 16 | 8 | .444 | Won First Round series, 2–0 (Brown); Tournament Cancelled | |
| 2020–21 | ECAC Hockey | 18 | 5 | 9 | 4 | 1 | 0 | 1 | .352 | 4th | 22 | 6 | 11 | 5 | .386 | Lost Semifinal, 4–5 (OT) (St. Lawrence) | |
| 2021–22 | ECAC Hockey | 22 | 9 | 9 | 4 | 1 | 0 | 3 | 33 | 5th | 40 | 18 | 18 | 4 | .500 | Won First Round series, 2–0 (Yale); Won Quarterfinal series, 2–1 (Cornell); Lost Semifinal, 1–3 (Quinnipiac) | |
| 2022–23 | ECAC Hockey | 22 | 11 | 8 | 3 | 4 | 1 | 3 | 36 | 5th | 40 | 19 | 16 | 5 | .538 | Won First Round, 5–3 (Dartmouth); Won Quarterfinal series, 2–0 (St. Lawrence); Won Semifinal, 2–1 (OT) (Quinnipiac); Won Championship, 3–2 (Harvard) | Lost Regional Semifinal, 1–11 (Michigan) |
Mike Harder (2023 — Present)
| 2023–24 | ECAC Hockey | 22 | 13 | 7 | 2 | 2 | 2 | 2 | 43 | 3rd | 36 | 16 | 16 | 4 | .500 | Lost Quarterfinal series, 0–2 (St. Lawrence) | |
| 2024–25 | ECAC Hockey | 22 | 13 | 7 | 2 | 2 | 2 | 1 | 42 | 3rd | 36 | 18 | 15 | 3 | .542 | Lost Quarterfinal series, 0–2 (Cornell) | |
| Totals | | | | | | | | | | | GP | W | L | T | % | Championships | |
| Regular Season | | | | | | | | | | | 2208 | 1052 | 989 | 167 | .514 | 3 ECAC Championships | |
| Conference Post-season | | | | | | | | | | | 150 | 63 | 84 | 3 | .430 | 2 ECAC tournament championships | |
| NCAA Post-season | | | | | | | | | | | 10 | 3 | 7 | 0 | .300 | 6 NCAA Tournament appearances, 1 Frozen Four appearance | |
| Regular Season and Post-season Record | | | | | | | | | | | 2368 | 1118 | 1080 | 170 | .508 | | |

* Winning percentage is used when conference schedules are unbalanced.
† Terry Slater died on December 6, four days after suffering a stroke.
