= Don Vaughan (ice hockey) =

Canadian ice hockey coach and former player

Biographical details
- Born: Almonte, Ontario, Canada

Playing career
- 1980–1981: Canton
- 1981–1984: St. Lawrence
- 1984–1985: Enschede Lions
- Position: Center

Coaching career (HC unless noted)
- 1984–1985: Enschede Lions (player-coach)
- 1985–1987: St. Lawrence (grad. assistant)
- 1987–1988: St. Lawrence (assistant)
- 1988–1990: Cornell (assistant)
- 1990–1992: St. Lawrence (assistant)
- 1992–2003: Colgate
- 2004–2023: Colgate

Administrative career (AD unless noted)
- 2003–2004: Colgate (interim AD)

Head coaching record
- Overall: 472–514–123 (.481)
- Tournaments: 0–4 (.000)

Accomplishments and honors

Championships
- 2006 ECAC Hockey regular season champion 2023 ECAC Hockey tournament champion

Awards
- 2000 ECAC Hockey Coach of the Year Award; 2014 Tim Taylor Award (ECAC Hockey)

Don Vaughan is a Canadian ice hockey retired coach and player. Vaughan had been the head coach at Colgate from 1992 through 2023 and is the programs leader in wins, losses, ties and tenure.

== Career ==
Vaughan began his college career at Canton College, playing for the hockey team for one season before transferring to the cross-town St. Lawrence University, a private university. More importantly Vaughan was now playing for a Division I program. Under Mike McShane Vaughan put up respectable numbers in his three seasons as the Saints posted winning records each year and made the 1983 NCAA Tournament, falling to eventual champion Wisconsin in the quarterfinals.

After graduating with a degree in economics Vaughan headed to Europe to serve as the player-coach for the Enschede Lions, an ice hockey club in the Netherlands.

In 1991 long-time Colgate coach Terry Slater died suddenly and, after the season was finished under Brian Durocher, Vaughan was picked to replace him. The initial seasons were a bit lacking but Vaughan built the program back to its winning ways soon enough, giving the Colgate faithful a 20-win season in 1994–95 which started them on to six consecutive winning seasons culminating with their first NCAA tournament berth in a decade. The season finished with Vaughan being awarded the 2000 ECAC Hockey Coach of the Year Award.

In 2003 Vaughan agreed to serve out the season as Colgate's interim athletic director, allowing long-time assistant Stan Moore to assume control of the team for the year. The Raiders performed exceptionally in his absence, winning a regular season title and earning Moore his own Coach of the Year Award. Not to be outdone, when Vaughen returned the following season he pushed Colgate to a 25-win season (the second-highest total in school history), earning him a second tournament berth which he followed up by winning his first regular season title.

After that the team began to flounder, failing to produce a winning season until 2011–12, but it wasn't all bad news for Vaughan as Colgate established an endowed hockey chair named in his honor. After winning his first conference championship in 2023, Vaughan retired after 30 years as the Raiders' head coach. He left as the program's all time leader in games, wins, losses and ties.

== Career statistics ==
			Regular season					Playoffs
Season	Team	League	GP	G	A	Pts	PIM	GP	G	A	Pts	PIM
1981–82	St. Lawrence	ECAC Hockey	31	11	23	34	10	—	—	—	—	—
1982–83	St. Lawrence	ECAC Hockey	36	15	15	30	40	—	—	—	—	—
1983–84	St. Lawrence	ECAC Hockey	29	15	11	26	20	—	—	—	—	—
NCAA totals			96	41	49	90	70	—	—	—	—	—

== Head coaching record ==
Record table
Season	Team	Overall	Conference	Standing	Postseason
Colgate Red Raiders (ECAC Hockey) (1992–2001)
1992–93	Colgate	13–18–3	9–13–0	t-8th	ECAC Quarterfinals
1993–94	Colgate	14–17–2	10–10–2	7th	ECAC Quarterfinals
1994–95	Colgate	20–16–1	12–9–1	t-3rd	ECAC third-place game (loss)
1995–96	Colgate	17–13–4	13–5–4	5th	ECAC Quarterfinals
1996–97	Colgate	16–14–3	10–9–3	7th	ECAC Preliminary Round
1997–98	Colgate	16–15–4	7–12–3	t-5th	ECAC first round
1998–99	Colgate	19–12–4	12–8–2	t-5th	ECAC Four vs. Five
1999-00	Colgate	24–9–2	14–4–2	2nd	NCAA East regional quarterfinals
2000–01	Colgate	10–20–4	8–13–1	11th	
Colgate:		149–134–27	95–83–18		
Colgate Raiders (ECAC Hockey) (2001–2003)
2001–02	Colgate	13–19–2	10–10–2	t-6th	ECAC first round
2002–03	Colgate	17–19–4	9–10–3	t-7th	ECAC Quarterfinals
Colgate:		30–38–6	19–20–5		
Colgate Raiders (ECAC Hockey) (2004–2003)
2004–05	Colgate	25–11–3	14–5–3	3rd	NCAA Midwest regional semifinals
2005–06	Colgate	20–13–6	14–6–2	t-1st	ECAC third-place game (loss)
2006–07	Colgate	15–21–4	7–12–3	t-8th	ECAC Quarterfinals
2007–08	Colgate	18–18–6	8–9–5	8th	ECAC third-place game (loss)
2008–09	Colgate	12–18–7	6–11–5	10th	ECAC first round
2009–10	Colgate	15–15–6	12–8–2	4th	ECAC Quarterfinals
2010–11	Colgate	11–28–3	4–15–3	12th	ECAC third-place game (loss)
2011–12	Colgate	19–17–3	11–10–1	t-4th	ECAC third-place game (loss)
2012–13	Colgate	14–18–4	6–13–3	11th	ECAC first round
2013–14	Colgate	20–14–5	13–6–3	2nd	NCAA Midwest regional semifinals
2014–15	Colgate	22–12–4	11–7–4	t-4th	ECAC Runner-Up
2015–16	Colgate	11–24–2	6–14–2	10th	ECAC first round
2016–17	Colgate	9–22–6	6–13–3	10th	ECAC first round
2017–18	Colgate	17–17–6	10–9–3	t-5th	ECAC first round
2018–19	Colgate	10–23–3	7–12–3	10th	ECAC first round
2019–20	Colgate	12–16–8	8–9–5	8th	Tournament Cancelled
2020–21	Colgate	6–11–5	5–9–4	4th	ECAC Semifinals
2021–22	Colgate	18–18–4	9–9–4	5th	ECAC Semifinals
2022–23	Colgate	19–16–5	11–8–3	5th	NCAA Midwest Regional Semifinals
Colgate:		293–332–90	168–185–61		
Total:		472–514–123			
National champion Postseason invitational champion Conference regular season champion Conference regular season and conference tournament champion Division regular season champion Division regular season and conference tournament champion Conference tournament champion

== See also ==
- List of college men's ice hockey coaches with 400 wins

Awards and achievements
Preceded by Joe Marsh; Rand Pecknold	Tim Taylor Award; 1999–2000; 2013–14	Succeeded by Mark Morris; Greg Carvel
