= Tim Taylor Award =

The Tim Taylor Award may refer to:

- Tim Taylor Award (NCAA), awarded annually to the NCAA Ice Hockey National Rookie of the Year
- Tim Taylor Award (ECAC Hockey), awarded annually to the best coach of ECAC Hockey

== See also ==
- Tim Taylor (ice hockey coach)
