= Greg Carvel =

American ice hockey player (born 1970)

- Born: August 17, 1970 (age 56) Canton, New York, U.S.
- Height: 5 ft 11 in (180 cm)
- Weight: 180 lb (82 kg; 12 st 12 lb)
- Position: Forward
- Played for: St. Lawrence Saints (NCAA)
- NHL draft: 1991 NHL Supplemental Draft; Pittsburgh Penguins
- Playing career: 1989–1993
- Coaching career

Current position
- Title: Head coach
- Team: Massachusetts
- Conference: Hockey East
- Record: 170–133–25 (.556)
- Annual salary: $500,000

Biographical details
- Education: St. Lawrence University

Playing career
- 1988–1989: Hotchkiss School
- 1989–1993: St. Lawrence
- 1993–1994: Östervåla IF
- Position: Forward

Coaching career (HC unless noted)
- 1994–1995: Canterbury School (assistant)
- 1995–1997: Amherst College (assistant)
- 1997–1999: Lowell Lock Monsters (Dir. Hockey Ops.)
- 1999–2003: Mighty Ducks of Anaheim (Scouting Coordinator)
- 2003–2004: Mighty Ducks of Anaheim (assistant)
- 2005–2011: Ottawa Senators (assistant)
- 2011–2012: St. Lawrence (assistant)
- 2012–2016: St. Lawrence
- 2015: Team USA (assistant)
- 2016–present: Massachusetts

Head coaching record
- Overall: 242–196–40 (.548)
- Tournaments: 8–4 (.667)

Accomplishments and honors

Championships
- NCAA national champion (2021) NCAA Frozen Four Appearance (2019, 2021) Hockey East Champion (2019) Hockey East tournament champion (2021, 2022)

Awards
- Tim Taylor Award (2015) Bob Kullen Coach of the Year Award (2019) Clark Hodder Coach of the Year Award (2019) Spencer Penrose Award (2019)

Records
- Coach; Single-season win record at UMass (31); Single-season Loss record at UMass (29)

Gregory Joseph Carvel (born August 17, 1970) is an American former NCAA ice hockey player and current coach. He is currently the head coach for the UMass Minutemen of the Hockey East conference. Carvel has been a head coach at St Lawrence University and an assistant coach in the National Hockey League (NHL) with both the Anaheim Ducks and Ottawa Senators.

== Career ==
Greg Carvel is a graduate of St. Lawrence University, having played four years for the ice hockey program. After a short professional career, Carvel became an assistant coach and progressed from high school through college and into the NHL as an assistant. After working for the Ottawa Senators for six seasons, Carvel returned to college to work as an assistant under his former coach, Joe Marsh, for one campaign before Marsh retired. Carvel took over the program at his alma mater, getting the team to two conference semifinals and earning a Tim Taylor Award in four years.

=== UMass ===
In 2016, Carvel left St. Lawrence to take over at Massachusetts where the program had fallen on hard times since the retirement of Don Cahoon. After a 5-win season his first year, Carvel got the Minutemen to post 17 wins in year two, their highest total since 2010. After the season, Carvel was given a contract extension through the 2022–23 season. The following year, with eventual Hobey Baker Award winner Cale Makar leading the way, Carvel's team posted the best record in the history of the program. UMass won 31 games as well as their first Hockey East regular season title and made it all the way to the National Championship Game.

On April 10, 2021, Carvel's UMass team won the national title, defeating St. Cloud State 5-0.

== Head coaching record ==
Record table
Season	Team	Overall	Conference	Standing	Postseason
St. Lawrence Saints (ECAC Hockey) (2012–2016)
2012–13	St. Lawrence	18–16–4	9–9–4	T–5th	ECAC quarterfinals
2013–14	St. Lawrence	15–19–4	7–11–4	8th	ECAC quarterfinals
2014–15	St. Lawrence	20–14–3	14–7–1	2nd	ECAC semifinals
2015–16	St. Lawrence	19–14–4	11–8–3	4th	ECAC semifinals
St. Lawrence:		72–63–15 (.530)	41–35–12 (.534)		
Massachusetts Minutemen (Hockey East) (2016–present)
2016–17	Massachusetts	5–29–2	2–19–1	12th	Hockey East Opening Round
2017–18	Massachusetts	17–20–2	9–13–2	8th	Hockey East Quarterfinals
2018–19	Massachusetts	31–10–0	18–6–0	1st	NCAA Runner–Up
2019–20	Massachusetts	21–11–2	14–8–2	2nd	Tournament cancelled
2020–21	Massachusetts	20–5–4	13–5–4	3rd	NCAA National Champion
2021–22	Massachusetts	22–13–2	14–8–2	T–2nd	NCAA Regional Semifinal
2022–23	Massachusetts	13–17–5	7–14–3	9th	Hockey East Opening Round
2023–24	Massachusetts	20–14–3	12–10–2	T–5th	NCAA Regional Semifinal
2023–24	Massachusetts	21–14–5	10–9–5	6th	NCAA Regional Final
Massachusetts:		170–133–25	99–92–21		
Total:		242–196–40 (.548)			
National champion Postseason invitational champion Conference regular season champion Conference regular season and conference tournament champion Division regular season champion Division regular season and conference tournament champion Conference tournament champion

Awards and achievements
Preceded by Award Created	ECAC Hockey Best Defensive Forward; 1992–93	Succeeded by Ian Sharp
Preceded by Don Vaughan	Tim Taylor Award; 2014–15	Succeeded by Rand Pecknold
Preceded by Jerry York	Bob Kullen Coach of the Year Award; 2018–19	Succeeded by Red Gendron
Preceded by Jeff Jackson	Spencer Penrose Award; 2018–19	Succeeded by Mike Schafer / Brad Berry
