= Rand Pecknold =

American ice hockey coach (born 1967)

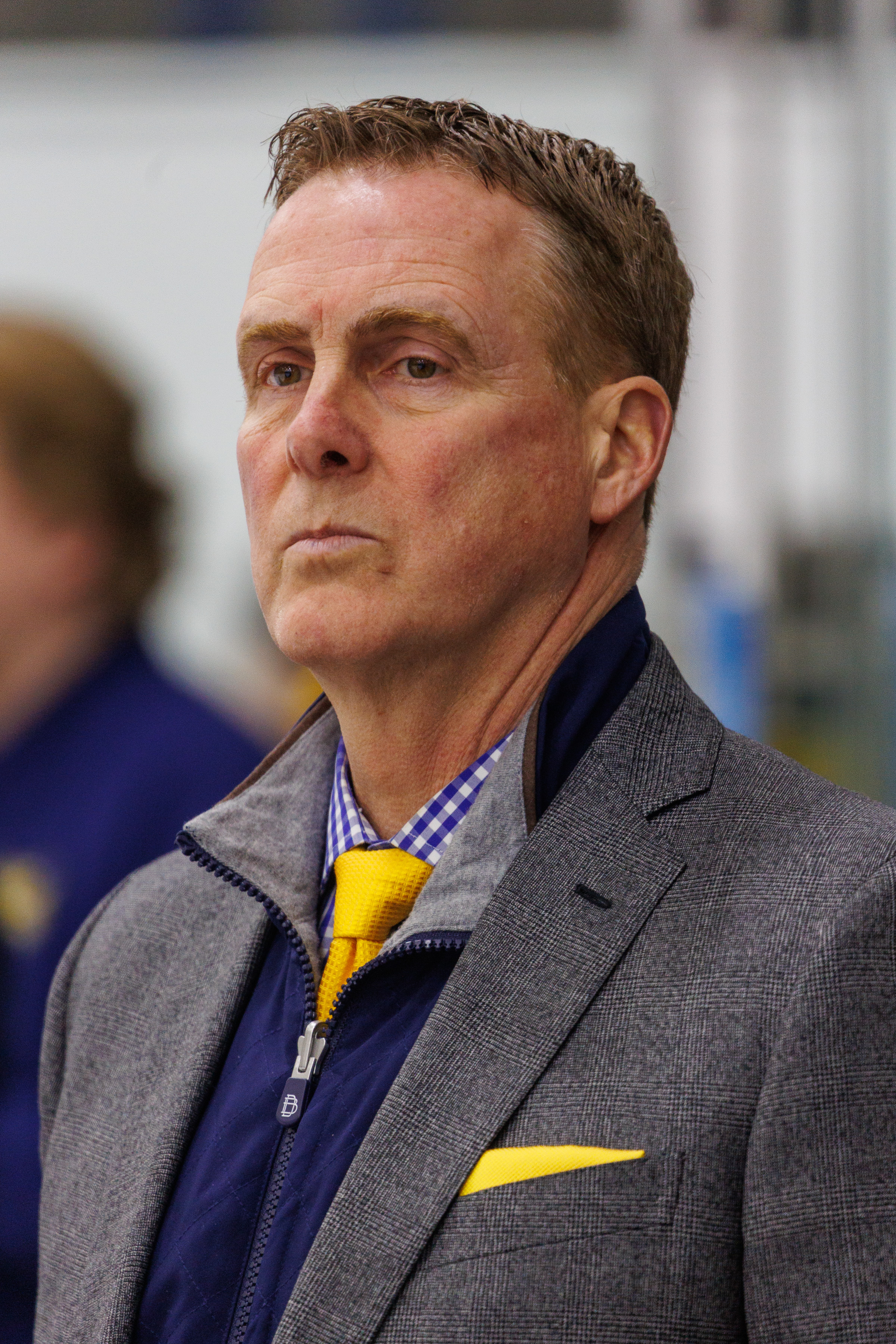

Current position
- Title: Head coach
- Team: Quinnipiac
- Conference: ECAC Hockey
- Record: 701–372–110 (.639)

Biographical details
- Born: February 4, 1967 (age 59); Bedford, New Hampshire, U.S.
- Education: Connecticut College (1990)

Playing career
- 1986–1990: Connecticut College
- Position: Defense

Coaching career (HC unless noted)
- 1991–1994: Connecticut College (assistant)
- 1994–present: Quinnipiac

Head coaching record
- Overall: 701–372–110 (.639)
- Tournaments: 13–10 (.565)

Accomplishments and honors

Championships
- NCAA champion (2023); 2× MAAC champion (1999, 2000); MAAC tournament champion (2002); Atlantic Hockey champion (2005); 10× ECAC Hockey champion (2013, 2015, 2016, 2019, 2021–2026); ECAC Hockey tournament champion (2016)

Awards
- Atlantic Hockey Coach of the Year (2005); 5× Tim Taylor Award (2013, 2016, 2021–2023); College Hockey News Coach of the Year (2016); Spencer Penrose Award (2016)

Records
- Quinnipiac school record for wins: (693)
Medal record
IIHF World U18 Championships
Assistant coach for the United States
Silver medal – second place	2018 Russia
IIHF World Junior Championships
Head coach for the United States
Bronze medal – third place	2023 Canada

Rand Pecknold (born February 4, 1967) is an American ice hockey coach who serves as the head coach for the men's ice hockey team at Quinnipiac University.

== Early life ==
Pecknold was born February 4, 1967, in Bedford, New Hampshire. He attended, and played varsity hockey, for Manchester High School West and Lawrence Academy. He went on to play collegiately at Division III Connecticut College, where he set single season scoring records for goals and points by a defenseman.

== Career ==
Pecknold was an assistant hockey coach at Connecticut College for three years. Pecknold is currently the head coach of the Quinnipiac Bobcats men's ice hockey team. He took over the program at Quinnipiac in 1994 and led the transition from Division II to Division I in the 1998–99 season, when he was able to become full time as coach of the program. In his first five years at Quinnipiac, he continued to teach high school history at North Haven High School.

In his 19th season behind the bench, he led the Bobcats to the 2013 Frozen Four where they lost the national championship to archrival Yale. In the 2014–15 season, Pecknold reached 400 career wins, making him the 33rd Division I head coach to reach such a feat. Pecknold once again led the Bobcats to the Frozen Four in 2015–16 where they fell in the national championship to North Dakota 5–1. In April 2017, Pecknold was selected by USA Hockey as an assistant coach for the U.S. Men's National Team at the 2017 IIHF World Championship in Germany and France. In 2022, he was named head coach of the U.S. National Junior Team at the 2023 IIHF World Junior Championship in Canada. After losing to the defending and eventual back-to-back world junior champions Canada in the semifinals, Pecknold led the U.S. to the bronze medal game, where they defeated Sweden 8–7 in overtime to win the bronze medal. He coached the Quinnipiac Bobcats to the 2022–23 NCAA Men's Ice Hockey Division I National Championship.

== Head coaching record ==
Record table
Season	Team	Overall	Conference	Standing	Postseason
Quinnipiac Braves (ECAC South) (1994–1997)
1994–95	Quinnipiac	6–15–1	5–8–1	T–6th	
1995–96	Quinnipiac	11–12–4	6–3–3	T–3rd	
1996–97	Quinnipiac	13–12–2	8–6–0	4th	
Quinnipiac:		30–39–7			
Quinnipiac Braves Independent (1997–1998)
1997–98	Quinnipiac	19–3–1			
Quinnipiac:		19–3–1			
Quinnipiac Braves (MAAC) (1998–2002)
1998–99	Quinnipiac	26–6–2	22–4–2	1st	MAAC semifinals
1999–00	Quinnipiac	27–6–3	23–1–2	1st	MAAC semifinals
2000–01	Quinnipiac	22–11–4	17–7–2	2nd	MAAC runner-up
2001–02	Quinnipiac	20–13–5	15–6–5	2nd	NCAA first round
Quinnipiac:		95–36–14	77–18–11		
Quinnipiac Bobcats (MAAC) (2002–2003)
2002–03	Quinnipiac	22–13–1	18–7–1	2nd	MAAC runner-up
Quinnipiac:		22–13–1	18–7–1		
Quinnipiac Bobcats (Atlantic Hockey) (2003–2005)
2003–04	Quinnipiac	15–14–6	12–6–6	3rd	Atlantic Hockey Quarterfinals
2004–05	Quinnipiac	21–13–3	16–6–2	1st	Atlantic Hockey runner-up
Quinnipiac:		36–27–9	28–12–8		
Quinnipiac Bobcats (ECAC Hockey) (2005–present)
2005–06	Quinnipiac	20–18–1	8–13–1	10th	ECAC quarterfinals
2006–07	Quinnipiac	21–14–5	10–8–4	5th	ECAC runner-up
2007–08	Quinnipiac	20–15–4	9–9–4	6th	ECAC quarterfinals
2008–09	Quinnipiac	18–18–3	9–10–3	7th	ECAC quarterfinals
2009–10	Quinnpiac	20–18–2	11–11–0	7th	ECAC quarterfinals
2010–11	Quinnipiac	16–15–8	6–9–7	8th	ECAC quarterfinals
2011–12	Quinnipiac	20–14–6	9–8–5	5th	ECAC quarterfinals
2012–13	Quinnipiac	30–8–5	17–2–3	1st	NCAA National Runner-Up
2013–14	Quinnipiac	24–10–6	12–6–4	3rd	NCAA Regional semifinal
2014–15	Quinnipiac	23–12–4	16–3–3	1st	NCAA Regional semifinal
2015–16	Quinnipiac	32–4–7	16–1–5	1st	NCAA National Runner-Up
2016–17	Quinnipiac	23–15–2	13–8–2	5th	ECAC semifinals
2017–18	Quinnipiac	16–18–4	9–11–2	9th	ECAC quarterfinals
2018–19	Quinnipiac	26–10–2	14–6–2	1st	NCAA Midwest Regional final
2019–20	Quinnipiac	21–11–2	14–6–2	3rd	Tournament cancelled
2020–21	Quinnipiac	17–8–4	10–4–4	1st	NCAA West Regional semifinals
2021–22	Quinnipiac	32–7–3	17–4–1	1st	NCAA Midwest Regional finals
2022–23	Quinnipiac	34–4–3	20–2–0	1st	NCAA National Champion
2023–24	Quinnipiac	27–10–2	17–4–1	1st	NCAA East Regional Final
2024–25	Quinnipiac	24–12–2	16–5–1	1st	NCAA Allentown Regional Semifinal
2025–26	Quinnipiac	27–10–3	17–4–1	1st	NCAA Sioux Falls Regional Final
2026–27	Quinnipiac	8–3–0	3–1–0		
Quinnipiac:		476–249–77 (.642)	273–135–55 (.649)		
Total:		701–372–110 (.639)			
National champion Postseason invitational champion Conference regular season champion Conference regular season and conference tournament champion Division regular season champion Division regular season and conference tournament champion Conference tournament champion

== See also ==
- List of college men's ice hockey coaches with 400 wins

Awards and achievements
Preceded by Paul Pearl	Atlantic Hockey Coach of the Year; 2004–05	Succeeded by Brian Riley
Preceded by Rick Bennett; Greg Carvel; Mike Schafer	Tim Taylor Award; 2012–13; 2015–16; 2020–21 / 2021–22 / 2022–23	Succeeded by Don Vaughan; Rick Bennett; Reid Cashman
Preceded by Mike Hastings	Spencer Penrose Award; 2015–16	Succeeded by Jim Montgomery
