= Spencer Penrose Award =

American ice hockey award

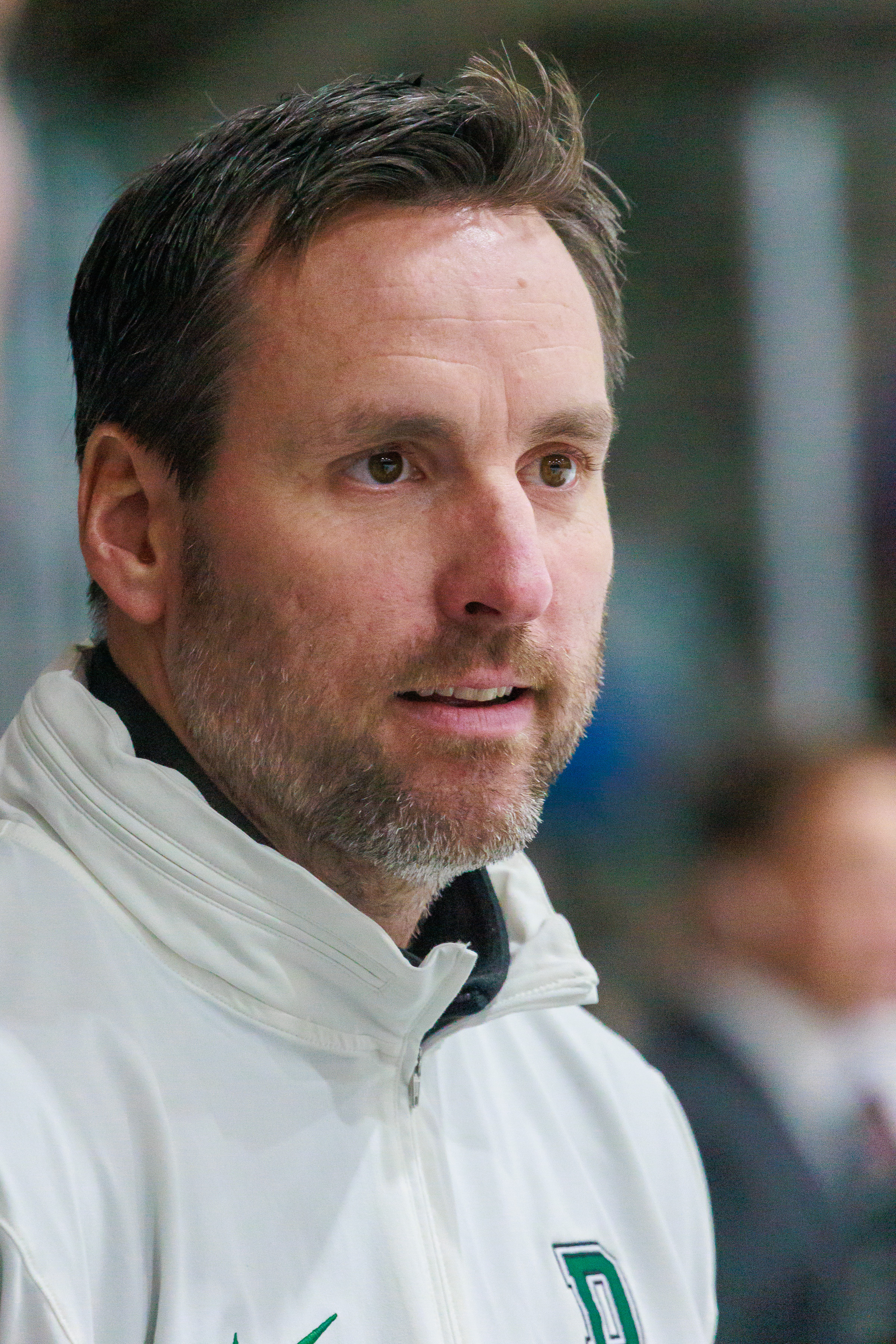
- Dartmouth's Reid Cashman
- Sport: Ice hockey
- Awarded for: The most outstanding coach in NCAA Division I men's ice hockey.

History
- First award: 1951
- Most recent: Reid Cashman

The Spencer Penrose Award is awarded yearly to the top coach in NCAA Division I men's ice hockey by the American Hockey Coaches Association.

The finalists for each year's award comprise the conference Coach of the Year winners from each Division I men's ice hockey conference, plus the coaches of the four Frozen Four teams.

Spencer Penrose was a philanthropist who helped construct The Broadmoor resort in Colorado Springs, Colorado, where the first ten college ice hockey championships were held.

Several coaches have won the award more than once but Len Ceglarski and George Gwozdecky are the only people to have done so for different teams. Mike Hastings is the only coach to win the award in consecutive seasons (As of 2023).

== Award winners ==
Award winners
Year	Coach	Team
1951	Eddie Jeremiah	Dartmouth
1952	Cheddy Thompson	Colorado College
1953	John Mariucci	Minnesota
1954	Vic Heyliger	Michigan
1955	Cooney Weiland	Harvard
1956	William Harrison	Clarkson
1957	Jack Riley	Army
1958	Harry Cleverly	Boston University
1959	John "Snooks" Kelley	Boston College
1960	Jack Riley	Army
1961	Murray Armstrong	Denver
1962	Jack Kelley	Colby
1963	Tony Frasca	Colorado College
1964	Tom Eccleston	Providence
1965	James Fullerton	Brown
1966	Amo Bessone	Michigan State
1966	Len Ceglarski	Clarkson
1967	Eddie Jeremiah	Dartmouth
1968	Ned Harkness	Cornell
1969	Charlie Holt	New Hampshire
1970	John MacInnes	Michigan Tech
1971	Cooney Weiland	Harvard
1972	John "Snooks" Kelley	Boston College
1973	Len Ceglarski	Boston College
1974	Charlie Holt	New Hampshire
1975	Jack Parker	Boston University

Award winners
Year	Coach	Team
1976	John MacInnes	Michigan Tech
1977	Jerry York	Clarkson
1978	Jack Parker	Boston University
1979	Charlie Holt	New Hampshire
1980	Rick Comley	Northern Michigan
1981	Bill O'Flaherty	Clarkson
1982	Fernie Flaman	Northeastern
1983	Bill Cleary	Harvard
1984	Mike Sertich	Minnesota–Duluth
1985	Len Ceglarski	Boston College
1986	Ralph Backstrom	Denver
1987	John Gasparini	North Dakota
1988	Frank Anzalone	Lake Superior State
1989	Joe Marsh	St. Lawrence
1990	Terry Slater	Colgate
1991	Rick Comley	Northern Michigan
1992	Ron Mason	Michigan State
1993	George Gwozdecky	Miami
1994	Don Lucia	Colorado College
1995	Shawn Walsh	Maine
1996	Bruce Crowder	Massachusetts–Lowell
1997	Dean Blais	North Dakota
1998	Tim Taylor	Yale
1999	Dick Umile	New Hampshire
2000	Joe Marsh	St. Lawrence
2001	Dean Blais	North Dakota

Award winners
Year	Coach	Team
2002	Tim Whitehead	Maine
2003	Bob Daniels	Ferris State
2004	Scott Sandelin	Minnesota–Duluth
2005	George Gwozdecky	Denver
2006	Enrico Blasi	Miami
2007	Jeff Jackson	Notre Dame
2008	Red Berenson	Michigan
2009	Jack Parker	Boston University
2010	Wayne Wilson	RIT
2011	Nate Leaman	Union
2012	Bob Daniels	Ferris State
2013	Norm Bazin	Massachusetts–Lowell
2014	Rick Bennett	Union
2015	Mike Hastings	Minnesota State
2016	Rand Pecknold	Quinnipiac
2017	Jim Montgomery	Denver
2018	Jeff Jackson	Notre Dame
2019	Greg Carvel	Massachusetts
2020	Brad Berry	North Dakota
2020	Mike Schafer	Cornell
2021	Mike Hastings	Minnesota State
2022	Mike Hastings	Minnesota State
2023	Bob Motzko	Minnesota
2024	Greg Brown	Boston College
2025	Pat Ferschweiler	Western Michigan
2026	Reid Cashman	Dartmouth

=== Winners by school ===
School	Winners
Boston College	5
Boston University	4
Clarkson	4
Denver	4
New Hampshire	4
North Dakota	4
Colorado College	3
Dartmouth	3
Harvard	3
Minnesota State	3
Army	2
Cornell	2
Ferris State	2
Maine	2
Miami	2
Michigan	2
Michigan State	2
Michigan Tech	2
Minnesota	2
Minnesota–Duluth	2
Northern Michigan	2
Notre Dame	2
St. Lawrence	2
Massachusetts–Lowell	2
Union	2
Brown	1
Colby	1
Colgate	1
Lake Superior State	1
Massachusetts	1
Northeastern	1
Providence	1
Quinnipiac	1
RIT	1
Western Michigan	1
Yale	1

=== Multiple Wins ===
School	Winners
Len Ceglarski	3
Mike Hastings	3
Charlie Holt	3
Jack Parker	3
Dean Blais	2
Rick Comley	2
Bob Daniels	2
George Gwozdecky	2
Jeff Jackson	2
Eddie Jeremiah	2
John "Snooks" Kelley	2
John MacInnes	2
Joe Marsh	2
Jack Riley	2
Cooney Weiland	2

== See also ==
Edward Jeremiah Award
