= Mike Schafer =

Cornell University ice hockey coach

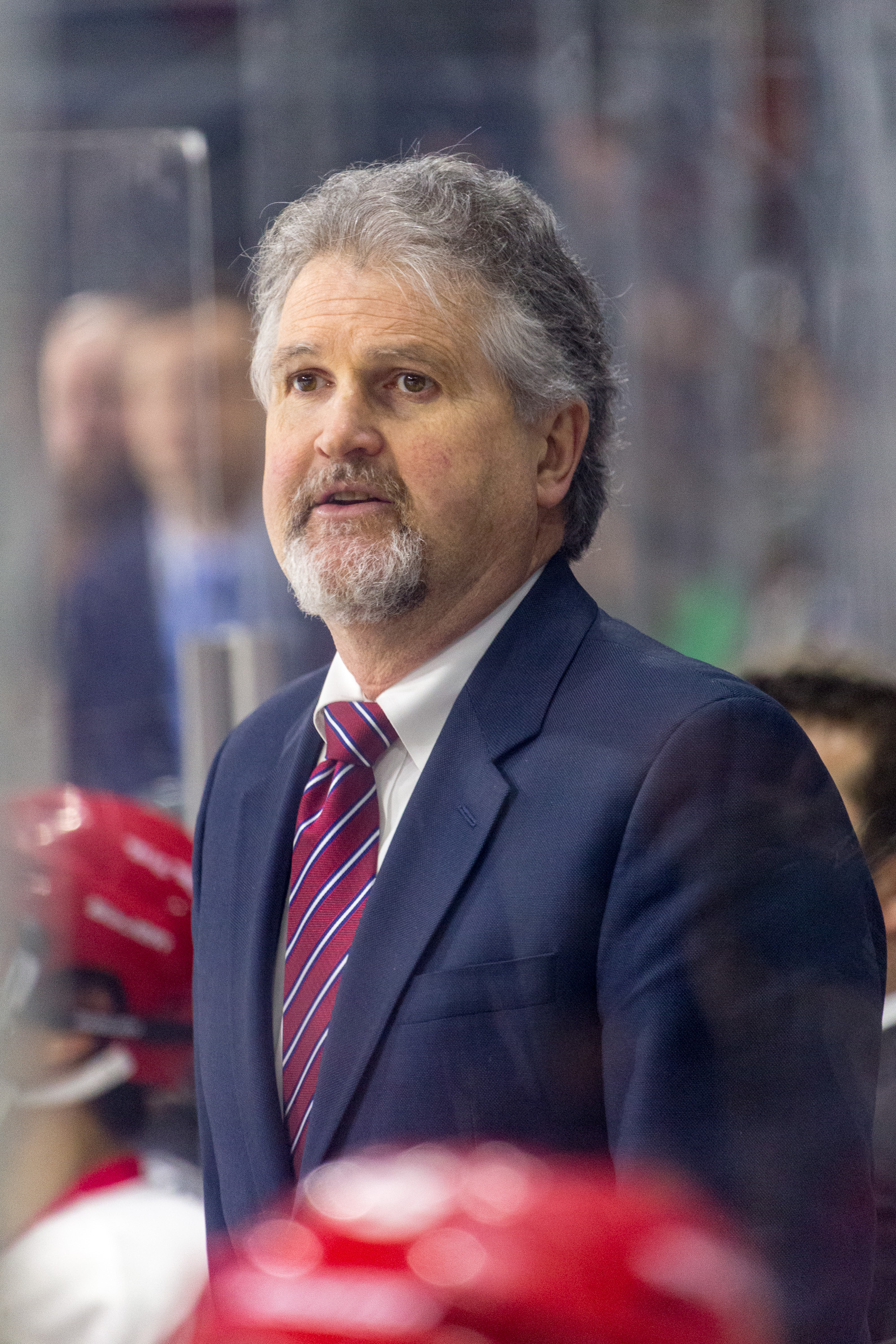
- Schafer at the NCAA East Regional in 2019

Biographical details
- Born: Durham, Ontario, Canada
- Education: Cornell University

Playing career
- 1982–1986: Cornell
- Position: Defenseman

Coaching career (HC unless noted)
- 1986–1990: Cornell (assistant)
- 1990–1995: Western Michigan (assistant)
- 1995–2025: Cornell

Head coaching record
- Overall: 561–300–117 (.633)
- Tournaments: 12–16 (.429)

Accomplishments and honors

Championships
- 6× ECAC regular season champion (2002, 2003, 2005, 2018, 2019, 2020); 7× ECAC Tournament Champion (1996, 1997, 2003, 2005, 2010, 2024, 2025)

Awards
- 2020 Spencer Penrose Award Division I Coach of the Year (co-winner); 5x ECAC Hockey Coach of the Year (2002, 2003, 2005, 2018, 2020); 4x Ivy League Coach of the Year (2018, 2019, 2020, 2024)

Mike Schafer is a former men's ice hockey coach who was the head coach at Cornell University from 1996 until 2025. He graduated from Cornell in 1986 with a degree in business management after leading the team to its first conference tournament championship in six years. Schafer retired as a player after his senior season and immediately became an assistant with the Big Red. Schafer left his alma mater after the 1989–90 season, taking a similar position with the Western Michigan Broncos of the CCHA. Five years later, after a downturn in the program that saw three consecutive losing seasons (including back-to-back single digit-win years) Cornell replaced Brian McCutcheon with Schafer as head coach. Schafer quickly returned the Big Red to prominence, winning the ECAC Hockey conference tournament his first two seasons back in Ithaca. Schafer has remained with Cornell ever since, becoming the longest tenured and the winningest coach in team history.

On June 13, 2024, Schafer announced that he would retire at the conclusion of the 2024-2025 hockey season.

== Career ==
Schafer has been credited as one of college hockey's premier defensive coaches as his teams consistently produce among the lowest goals allowed annually. Two of Schafer's goaltenders (David LeNeveu in 2003 and David McKee in 2005) hold the second and third lowest goals against averages in NCAA history for one season with the former backstopping the Big Red to their first frozen four since 1980 and first overall seed in 2003 (a rarity for ECAC programs). Schafer has made more appearances in the ECAC tournament championship game than any other head coach with 13 and has the record for most victories at seven. Schafer's 2003 team is thus far the only one to reach 30 wins in Cornell's history (though the 1970 undefeated and untied championship team only played 29 games, finishing 29-0-0).

Schafer was named co-winner of the 2020 Spencer Penrose Award as Division I Coach of the Year with Brad Berry of University of North Dakota. The Big Red went 23-2-4 (18-2-2 ECAC) before the season was cut short by the coronavirus pandemic.

== Head coaching record ==
Record table
Season	Team	Overall	Conference	Standing	Postseason
Cornell Big Red (ECAC Hockey) (1995–2025)
1995–96	Cornell	21–9–4	14–4–4	4th	NCAA Regional Quarterfinals
1996–97	Cornell	21–9–5	14–6–2	2nd	NCAA Regional Semifinals
1997–98	Cornell	15–16–2	9–12–1	8th	ECAC Four vs. Five
1998–99	Cornell	12–15–4	9–10–3	7th	ECAC Quarterfinals
1999-00	Cornell	16–14–2	10–9–1	t–4th	ECAC Third Place (Loss)
2000–01	Cornell	16–12–5	11–8–3	4th	ECAC Runner-Up
2001–02	Cornell	25–8–2	17–3–2	1st	NCAA Regional Semifinals
2002–03	Cornell	30–5–1	19–2–1	1st	NCAA Frozen Four
2003–04	Cornell	16–10–6	13–6–3	2nd	ECAC Quarterfinals
2004–05	Cornell	27–5–3	18–2–2	1st	NCAA West Regional Finals
2005–06	Cornell	22–9–4	13–6–3	3rd	NCAA Midwest Regional Finals
2006–07	Cornell	14–13–4	10–8–4	t–4th	ECAC Quarterfinals
2007–08	Cornell	19–14–3	12–9–1	t–4th	ECAC Third Place (Win)
2008–09	Cornell	22–10–4	13–6–3	2nd	NCAA Midwest Regional Finals
2009–10	Cornell	21–9–4	14–5–3	2nd	NCAA East Regional Semifinals
2010–11	Cornell	16–15–3	11–9–2	t–4th	ECAC Runner-Up
2011–12	Cornell	19–9–7	12–4–6	2nd	NCAA Midwest Regional Finals
2012–13	Cornell	15–16–3	8–11–3	t–9th	ECAC Quarterfinals
2013–14	Cornell	17–10–5	11–7–4	4th	ECAC Semifinals
2014–15	Cornell	11–14–6	9–9–4	7th	ECAC First Round
2015–16	Cornell	16–11–7	8–8–6	t-7th	ECAC Quarterfinals
2016–17	Cornell	21–9–5	13–4–5	3rd	NCAA Northeast Regional Semifinals
2017–18	Cornell	25–6–2	17–3–2	1st	NCAA Northeast Regional Semifinals
2018–19	Cornell	21–11–4	13–5–4	T–1st	NCAA East Regional Finals
2019–20	Cornell	23–2–4	18–2–2	1st	Tournament Cancelled
2021–22	Cornell	18–10–4	12–6–4	4th	ECAC Quarterfinals
2022–23	Cornell	21–11–2	15–6–1	3rd	NCAA East Regional Final
2023–24	Cornell	22–7–6	12–6–4	2nd	NCAA Northeast Regional Final
2024–25	Cornell	19–11–6	10–8–4	6th	NCAA Midwest Regional Final
Cornell:		561–300–117 (.633)	347–182–88 (.634)		
Total:		561–300–117 (.633)			
National champion Postseason invitational champion Conference regular season champion Conference regular season and conference tournament champion Division regular season champion Division regular season and conference tournament champion Conference tournament champion

== See also ==
- List of college men's ice hockey coaches with 400 wins

Awards and achievements
Preceded by Mark Morris; Stan Moore; Rick Bennett; Casey Jones	Tim Taylor Award; 2001–02 / 2002–03; 2004–05; 2017–18; 2019–20	Succeeded by Stan Moore; Bob Gaudet; Casey Jones; Rand Pecknold
Preceded by Greg Carvel	Spencer Penrose Award; 2019–20 (with Brad Berry)	Succeeded by Mike Hastings
