= Nate Leaman =

American ice hockey coach (born 1972)

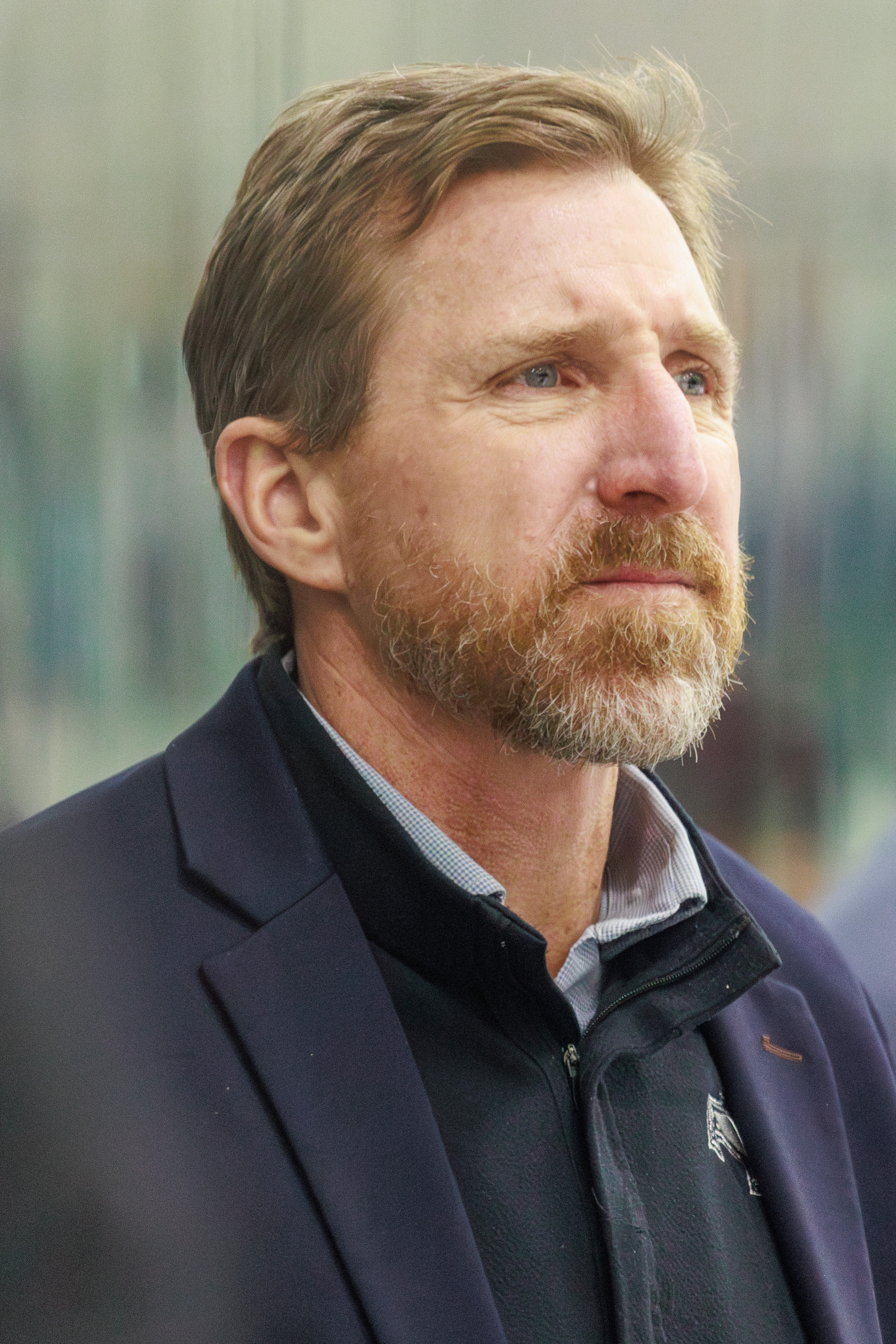
- Leaman in 2025

Current position
- Title: Head coach
- Team: Providence
- Conference: Hockey East
- Record: 280–174–67 (.602)

Biographical details
- Born: November 27, 1972 (age 53); Centerville, Ohio, U.S.
- Education: SUNY Cortland

Coaching career (HC unless noted)
- 1998–1999: Maine (asst.)
- 1999–2003: Harvard (asst.)
- 2003–2011: Union
- 2011–: Providence

Head coaching record
- Overall: 418–301–102 (.571)
- Tournaments: 8–7 (.533)

Accomplishments and honors

Championships
- As An Assistant: NCAA national champions (1999); As a Head Coach: NCAA national champions (2015); 2× NCAA Frozen Four Appearances (2015, 2019); ECAC Hockey Conference regular season champions (2011); Hockey East Conference regular season champions (2016) IIHF World Junior Champions (2021)

Awards
- 2× Tim Taylor Award (2010, 2011) Spencer Penrose Award (2011) 2× Bob Kullen Award (2016, 2026)

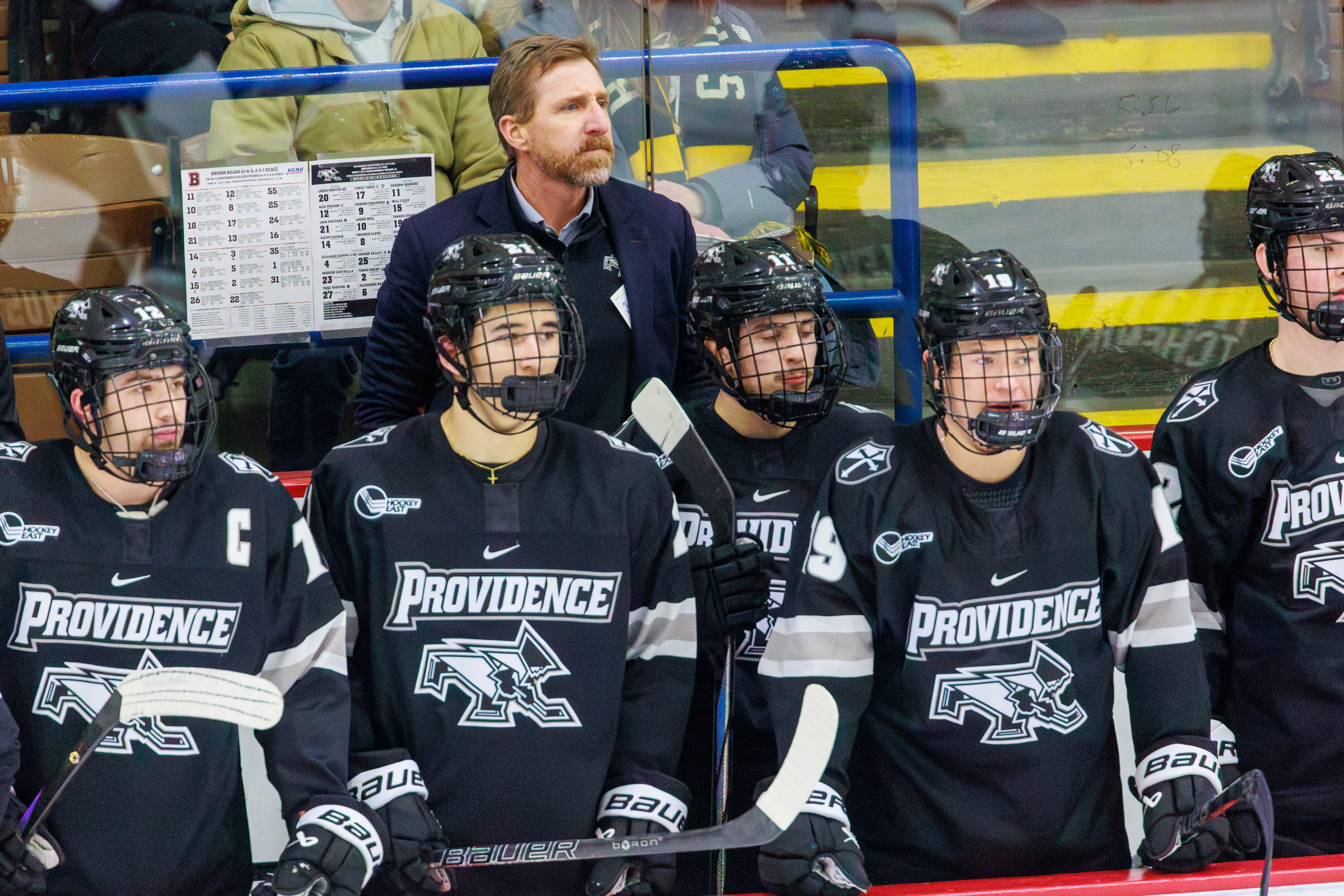
Leaman and players in 2025

Nate Leaman (born November 27, 1972) is an American ice hockey coach. He is currently the head coach for Providence. He was previously head coach at Union.

== Career ==
Leaman grew up in Centerville, Ohio, not playing hockey until he was a teenager. He attended SUNY Cortland, where he played on the hockey team, and graduated in 1997. He was inducted into the Cortland C-Club Hall of Fame in September 2014.

After Mark Mazzoleni resigned as Harvard head coach in June 2004, Leaman was reported to be considered for the position. However, he announced that he would not pursue the Harvard job and remain at Union.

Leaman was named ECAC Coach of the Year for the 2009–10 season and the 2010–11 season. He also won the Spencer Penrose Award for the 2010–11 season.

In April 2011, Leaman was hired to coach the Providence Friars. In September 2013, Leaman signed a contract extension with Providence through the 2020–21 season.

In 2014–15, after leading Providence to winning the national championship, Leaman was named USCHO Coach of the Year.

On January 5, 2021, as the head coach for Team USA's National Junior Team at the 2021 IIHF World Junior Championship in Edmonton, Canada, Leaman guided the team to the gold medal with a 2–0 shutout victory over host country Canada.

== Head coaching record ==
Record table
Season	Team	Overall	Conference	Standing	Postseason
Union Dutchmen (ECAC Hockey) (2003–2011)
2003–04	Union	14–17–5	8–11–3	8th	ECAC First Round
2004–05	Union	13–22–2	8–13–1	8th	ECAC First Round
2005–06	Union	16–16–6	9–9–4	T–6th	ECAC First Round
2006–07	Union	14–19–3	7–14–1	12th	ECAC First Round
2007–08	Union	15–14–6	10–7–5	T–4th	ECAC Quarterfinals
2008–09	Union	19–17–3	9–11–2	T–8th	ECAC Quarterfinals
2009–10	Union	21–12–6	12–6–4	3rd	ECAC Runner-Up
2010–11	Union	26–10–4	17–3–2	1st	NCAA East Regional Semifinals
Union:		138–127–35 (.518)			
Providence Friars (Hockey East) (2011–present)
2011–12	Providence	14–20–4	10–14–3	7th	Hockey East Semifinals
2012–13	Providence	17–14–7	13–8–6	T–3rd	Hockey East Semifinals
2013–14	Providence	22–11–6	11–7–2	3rd	NCAA East Regional Finals
2014–15	Providence	26–13–2	13–8–1	T-2nd	NCAA National Champion
2015–16	Providence	27–7–4	16–3–3	T-1st	NCAA Northeast Regional Semifinals
2016–17	Providence	22–9–5	12–7–3	5th	NCAA East Regional Semifinals
2017–18	Providence	24–12–4	13–7–4	3rd	NCAA East Regional Finals
2018–19	Providence	24–12–6	14–7–3	2nd	NCAA Frozen Four
2019–20	Providence	16–12–6	10–11–3	T–7th	Tournament Cancelled
2020–21	Providence	11–9–5	10–8–5	5th	Hockey East Semifinals
2021–22	Providence	22–14–2	12–11–1	7th	Hockey East Quarterfinals
2022–23	Providence	16–14–7	9–9–6	T–6th	Hockey East Semifinals
2023–24	Providence	18–13–4	11–9–4	4th	Hockey East Quarterfinals
2024–25	Providence	21–11–5	11–8–5	5th	NCAA Manchester Regional Semifinal
Providence:		280–174–67 (.602)			
Total:		418–301–102 (.571)			
National champion Postseason invitational champion Conference regular season champion Conference regular season and conference tournament champion Division regular season champion Division regular season and conference tournament champion Conference tournament champion

== See also ==
- List of college men's ice hockey coaches with 400 wins

Awards and achievements
Preceded by Keith Allain	Tim Taylor Award; 2009–10; 2010–11	Succeeded by Rick Bennett
Preceded by Wayne Wilson	Spencer Penrose Award; 2010–11	Succeeded by Bob Daniels
Preceded by David Quinn	Bob Kullen Coach of the Year Award; 2015–16	Succeeded by Norm Bazin
