= Mark Morris (ice hockey) =

American ice hockey player and coach

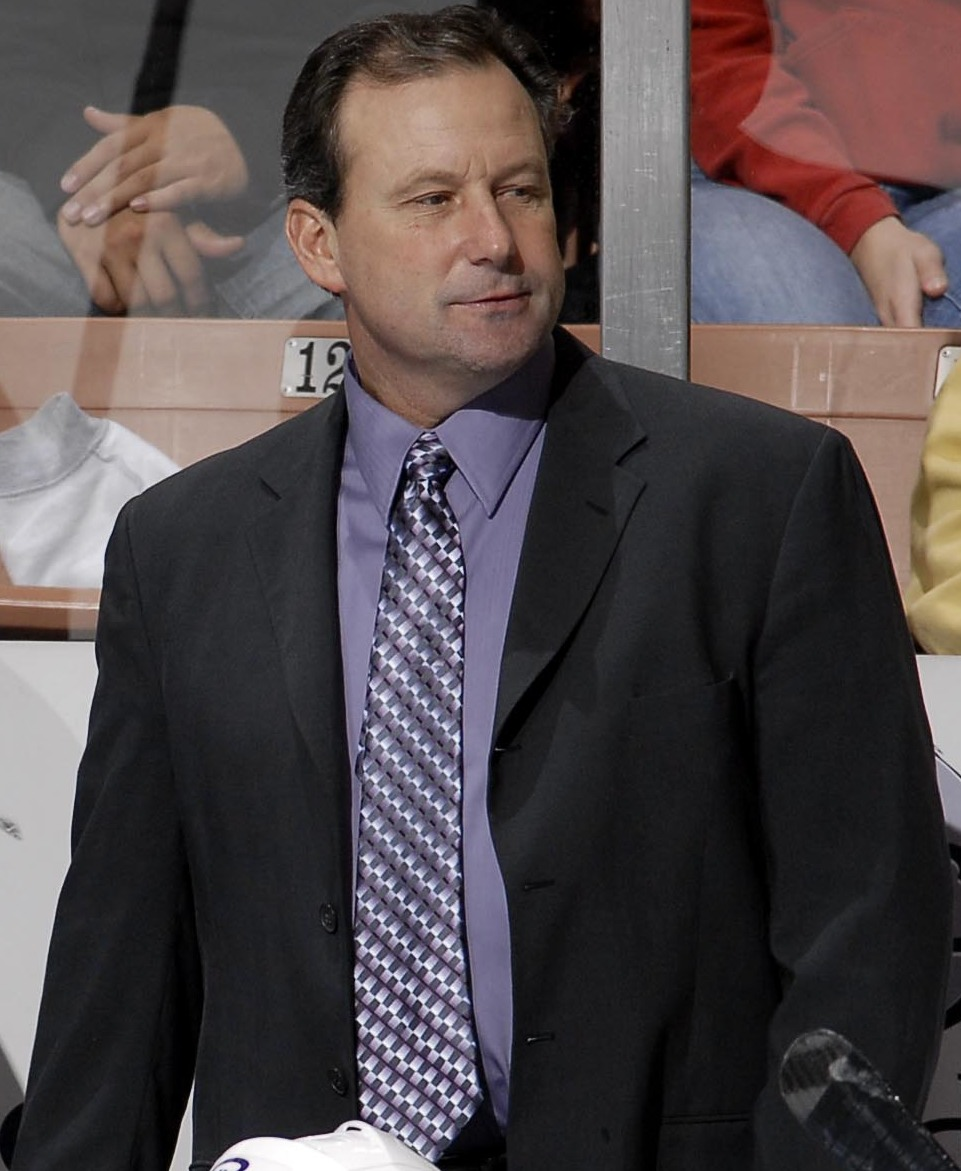
- Morris in 2006
- Born: March 31, 1958 (age 68) Massena, New York, U.S.
- Height: 5 ft 11 in (180 cm)
- Weight: 175 lb (79 kg; 12 st 7 lb)
- Position: Defense
- Played for: New Haven Nighthawks (AHL); Dallas Black Hawks (CHL)
- NHL draft: Undrafted
- Playing career: 1981–1984
- Coaching career

Playing career
- 1977–1981: Colgate
- Position: Defenseman

Coaching career (HC unless noted)
- 1984–1985: Union (assistant)
- 1985–1988: St. Lawrence (assistant)
- 1988–2002: Clarkson
- 2003: Vancouver Canucks (assistant)
- 2003–2004: Saginaw Spirit (assistant)
- 2004–2006: Northwood School Prep
- 2006–2014: Manchester Monarchs
- 2014–2015: Florida Panthers (assistant)
- 2015–2016: Charlotte Checkers
- 2016–2019: St. Lawrence

Head coaching record
- Overall: 337–225–53 (.591)

Accomplishments and honors

Championships
- 1991 ECAC Hockey Regular Season; 1991 ECAC Hockey Tournament; 1993 ECAC Hockey Tournament; 1995 ECAC Hockey Regular Season; 1997 ECAC Hockey Regular Season; 1999 ECAC Hockey Regular Season; 1999 ECAC Hockey Tournament; 2001 ECAC Hockey Regular Season

Awards
- 1991 ECAC Hockey Coach of the Year; 2001 ECAC Hockey Coach of the Year

Mark Morris (born March 31, 1958) is an American former professional ice hockey defenseman. He was the head coach of St. Lawrence from 2016-2019, succeeding Greg Carvel who departed for UMass.

== Career ==
Morris played four seasons (1981 – 1984) of professional hockey, mostly with the New Haven Nighthawks of the American Hockey League (AHL), where he scored 9 goals and 33 assists for 42 points, with 146 penalty minutes, in 156 AHL games played.

Following his playing career, Morris turned to coaching and found his way to Clarkson. He became the Golden Knights most successful coach winning more games, regular season titles, tournament titles and reaching more NCAA tournaments than anyone in school history.

In November 2002, Morris was fired three games into the 2002-03 season following an on-ice incident with one of his own players. Clarkson president Denny Brown said that in light of both the incident and Morris' refusal to take part in an internal investigation that had taken place, Clarkson had no choice but to fire Morris immediately.

In professional hockey, Morris began his professional coaching career under Marc Crawford, serving from February 2003 to April 2003 as the Special Assistant Coach/Interim Strength and Conditioning Coach for the Vancouver Canucks of the NHL. Then, after a two-year stint at a prep school in Lake Placid, Morris landed a job with the Manchester Monarchs of the American Hockey League in 2006. He spent eight years as head coach, compiling a record of 339-223-67, making him the only coach in history with over 300 wins in both the college and professional ranks.

In 2016 Morris returned to the college game, taking over at St. Lawrence, which is less than 10 miles from Clarkson University, and attempted to try and continue the success he had in the 1990s. After a good first season Morris found himself mired in an NCAA investigation that alleged multiple serious rules violations but after three months he was cleared on all but one minor infraction. In his third season Morris posted the second-worst record in program history, including the most losses for any Saints team, and was unsurprisingly fired at the end of the postseason.

== Head coaching record ==
=== College ===
Record table
Season	Team	Overall	Conference	Standing	Postseason
Clarkson Golden Knights (ECAC Hockey) (1988–2003)
1988–89	Clarkson	16–13–3	13–7–2	4th	ECAC Quarterfinals
1989–90	Clarkson	21–11–3	12–7–3	t-3rd	ECAC Semifinals
1990–91	Clarkson	29–9–2	15–5–2	1st	NCAA Frozen Four
1991–92	Clarkson	22–10–1	16–6–1	t-2nd	ECAC Semifinals
1992–93	Clarkson	20–10–5	12–6–4	t-3rd	NCAA East regional quarterfinals
1993–94	Clarkson	20–9–5	13–5–4	2nd	ECAC third-place game (win)
1994–95	Clarkson	23–10–4	14–5–3	1st	NCAA East regional quarterfinals
1995–96	Clarkson	25–10–3	16–4–2	2nd	NCAA East regional semifinals
1996–97	Clarkson	27–10–0	17–5–0	1st	NCAA East regional semifinals
1997–98	Clarkson	23–9–3	16–4–2	2nd	NCAA East regional quarterfinals
1998–99	Clarkson	25–11–1	18–4–0	1st	NCAA East regional semifinals
1999–00	Clarkson	17–15–3	9–8–3	t-4th	ECAC Four vs. Five
2000–01	Clarkson	21–11–3	15–5–2	1st	ECAC Quarterfinals
2001–02	Clarkson	17–15–6	11–6–5	2nd	ECAC third-place game (loss)
2002–03 †	Clarkson	0–3–0 †	0–1–0 †		
Clarkson:		306–156–42	198–78–34		
St. Lawrence Saints (ECAC Hockey) (2016–2019)
2016–17	St. Lawrence	17–13–7	12–6–4	4th	ECAC Quarterfinals
2017–18	St. Lawrence	8–27–2	3–18–1	12th	ECAC first round
2018–19	St. Lawrence	6–29–2	3–17–2	12th	ECAC first round
St. Lawrence:		31–69–11	18–41–7		
Total:		337–225–53			
National champion Postseason invitational champion Conference regular season champion Conference regular season and conference tournament champion Division regular season champion Division regular season and conference tournament champion Conference tournament champion

† Morris was fired mid-season

Awards and achievements
Preceded by Terry Slater; Don Vaughan	Tim Taylor Award; 1990–91; 2000–01	Succeeded by Tim Taylor; Mike Schafer
