= Rick Bennett =

American ice hockey player and coach

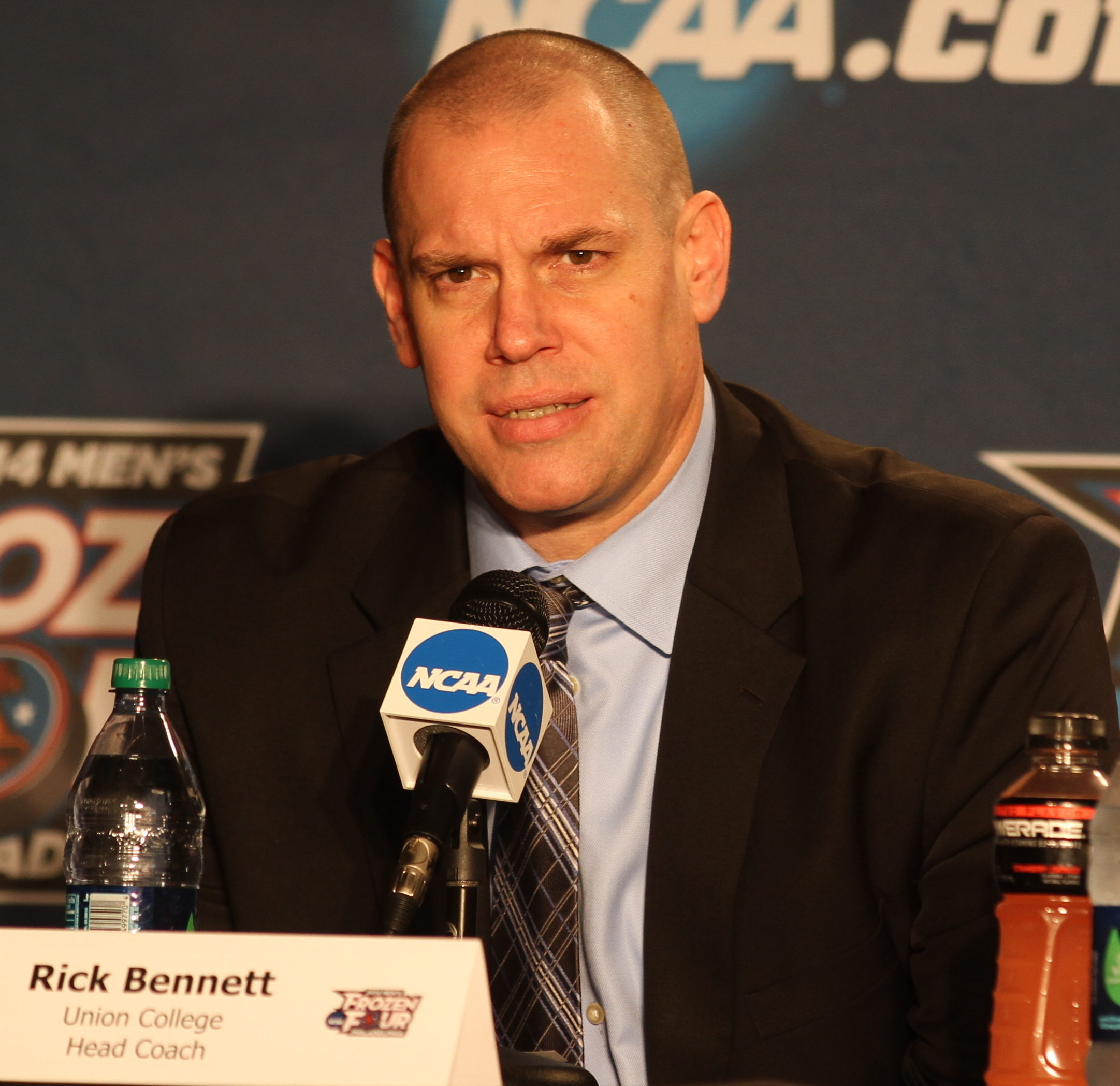
- Bennett with Union in 2014
- Born: July 24, 1967 (age 59) Springfield, Massachusetts, U.S.
- Height: 6 ft 3 in (191 cm)
- Weight: 218 lb (99 kg; 15 st 8 lb)
- Position: Left wing
- Shot: Left
- Played for: New York Rangers
- NHL draft: 54th overall, 1986; Minnesota North Stars
- Playing career: 1990–1999
- Coaching career

Current position
- Title: Assistant coach
- Team: Maine
- Conference: Hockey East

Biographical details
- Education: Providence College

Coaching career (HC unless noted)
- 2000–2005: Providence (asst.)
- 2005–2007: Union (asst.)
- 2007–2011: Union (asso. head coach)
- 2011–2022: Union
- 2022–2024: Savannah Ghost Pirates
- 2024–2025: Quinnipiac (asst.)
- 2025–Present: Maine (asst.)

Head coaching record
- Overall: 192–133–45 (.580)

Accomplishments and honors

Championships
- 2014 NCAA Champion; 3× ECAC regular season champion (2011-12, 2013-14, 2016-17), 3× ECAC Tournament Champion (2012, 2013, 2014)

Awards
- 2014 Spencer Penrose Award; 2014 College Hockey News Coach of the Year; 2014 USCHO Coach of the Year; 2012 Tim Taylor Award; 2017 Tim Taylor Award

Eric John "Rick" Bennett (born July 24, 1967) is an American former ice hockey left winger and former head coach of the Savannah Ghost Pirates. He is the former head coach of the Union Garnet Chargers men's ice hockey team of Union College, where he coached from 2011 until 2022. He played 15 games in the National Hockey League with the New York Rangers over three seasons from 1990 to 1991. The rest of his career, which lasted from 1990 to 1999, was spent in the minor leagues.

== Playing career ==
Bennett was a four-year letterwinner (1986–90) and co-captain at Providence, where he was recognized as a Hobey Baker finalist (1990) and two-time winner of the Lou Lamoriello Trophy as team MVP. He was named an All-American during the 1988-89 season and earned All-Hockey East Second Team honors in 1990. A left-winger, Bennett finished with 134 points (50 goals, 84 assists) in 128 career games. Bennett skated on the famed B-B-G line, along with center Mike Boback and right wing Robbie Gaudreau. Rick, who graduated with a B.A. in general studies, was inducted into the Providence College Athletic Hall of Fame in 2012.

Bennett was a third-round draft pick (54th overall) of the Minnesota North Stars in the 1986 NHL entry draft. His draft rights were later traded to the New York Rangers. Bennett appeared in 15 games with the Rangers over three seasons (1989–90, 1990–91, 1991–92). Bennett's 10-year professional career also included stints with the Binghamton Rangers (AHL), Springfield Indians (AHL), Hershey Bears (AHL), Springfield Falcons (AHL), Albany River Rats (AHL), Cincinnati Cyclones (IHL), Jacksonville Lizard Kings (ECHL) and Pee Dee Pride (ECHL). Bennett served as a player assistant coach for the Jacksonville Lizard Kings and Pee Dee Pride.

== Coaching career ==
Bennett served as head coach at Union College from 2011 to 2022, leading the Dutchmen to three ECAC Hockey regular season titles (2011–12, 2014-14 & 2016-17), three ECAC Hockey tournament titles (2012, 2013 & 2014), four NCAA Tournament appearances (2012, 2013, 2014 & 2017), two Frozen Fours (2012 & 2014) and one NCAA championship title (2014) by defeating Minnesota. Bennett won ECAC Hockey's Tim Taylor Award for conference coach of the year twice (2012 & 2017), and won the American Hockey Coaches Association's Spencer Penrose Award for NCAA Division I coach of the year in 2014. Bennett resigned in 2022 following an allegation about his coaching style and practices that was substantiated through an investigation by Union College.

On May 19, 2022, Bennett was announced to be the first head coach of the ECHL expansion team Savannah Ghost Pirates.

On February 1, 2024, it was announced that Bennett would be relieved from his duties as head coach of the Savannah Ghost Pirates.

== Personal life ==
Bennett and his wife, Karyn have five children together. The family resides in Clifton Park, New York.

== Career statistics ==
=== Regular season and playoffs ===
			Regular season					Playoffs
Season	Team	League	GP	G	A	Pts	PIM	GP	G	A	Pts	PIM
1985–86	Wilbraham & Monson Academy	HS-MA	20	30	69	99	25	—	—	—	—	—
1986–87	Providence College	HE	32	15	12	27	34	—	—	—	—	—
1987–88	Providence College	HE	33	9	16	25	70	—	—	—	—	—
1988–89	Providence College	HE	32	14	32	46	74	—	—	—	—	—
1989–90	Providence College	HE	31	12	24	36	74	—	—	—	—	—
1989–90	New York Rangers	NHL	6	1	0	1	5	—	—	—	—	—
1990–91	New York Rangers	NHL	6	0	0	0	6	—	—	—	—	—
1990–91	Binghamton Rangers	AHL	71	27	32	59	206	10	2	1	3	27
1991–92	New York Rangers	NHL	3	0	1	1	2	—	—	—	—	—
1991–92	Binghamton Rangers	AHL	69	19	23	42	112	11	0	1	1	23
1992–93	Binghamton Rangers	AHL	76	15	22	37	114	10	0	0	0	30
1993–94	Springfield Indians	AHL	67	9	19	28	82	6	1	0	1	31
1994–95	Springfield Falcons	AHL	34	3	5	8	74	—	—	—	—	—
1994–95	Hershey Bears	AHL	30	3	4	7	40	3	2	1	3	14
1995–96	Jacksonville Lizard Kings	ECHL	67	28	34	62	182	18	5	10	15	30
1995–96	Cincinnati Cyclones	IHL	4	0	1	1	0	1	0	0	0	2
1996–97	Jacksonville Lizard Kings	ECHL	64	23	33	56	120	—	—	—	—	—
1996–97	Albany River Rats	AHL	4	0	0	0	0	—	—	—	—	—
1997–98	Pee Dee Pride	ECHL	68	12	30	42	137	8	3	2	5	14
1998–99	Pee Dee Pride	ECHL	66	21	18	39	103	11	3	1	4	33
AHL totals			351	76	105	181	628	40	5	3	8	125
NHL totals			15	1	1	2	13	—	—	—	—	—

== Head coaching record ==
Record table
Season	Team	Overall	Conference	Standing	Postseason
Union Dutchmen (ECAC Hockey) (2011–2022)
2011–12	Union	26–8–7	14–4–4	1st	NCAA Frozen Four
2012–13	Union	22–13–5	10–8–4	4th	NCAA Regional finals
2013–14	Union	32–6–4	18–3–1	1st	NCAA Champions
2014–15	Union	19–18–2	8–13–1	10th	ECAC quarterfinals
2015–16	Union	13–14–9	6–10–6	9th	ECAC first round
2016–17	Union	25–10–3	16–4–2	T-1st	NCAA regional semifinals
2017–18	Union	21–15–2	16–5–1	2nd	ECAC quarterfinals
2018–19	Union	20–13–6	10–10–2	7th	ECAC quarterfinals
2019–20	Union	8–25–4	5–15–2	10th	ECAC first round
2021–22	Union	6–11–3 ^{†}	4–6–1 ^{†}	-	N/A
Union:		192–133–45	107–78–24		
Total:		192–133–45			
National champion Postseason invitational champion Conference regular season champion Conference regular season and conference tournament champion Division regular season champion Division regular season and conference tournament champion Conference tournament champion

† Bennet resigned mid-season.

== Awards and honors ==
Award	Year
All-Hockey East Rookie Team	1986–87
AHCA East Second-Team All-American	1988–89
All-Hockey East Second team	1989–90

Awards and achievements
Preceded by Nate Leaman; Rand Pecknold	Tim Taylor Award; 2011–12; 2016–17	Succeeded by Rand Pecknold; Mike Schafer
Preceded by Norm Bazin	Spencer Penrose Award; 2013–14	Succeeded by Mike Hastings
Sporting positions
Preceded by Nate Leaman	Union Dutchmen men's ice hockey Head Coach; 2011–22	Succeeded by John Ronan
