= Joe Marsh (ice hockey) =

American ice hockey coach

Biographical details
- Born: October 26, 1951 (age 75); Lynn, Massachusetts, U.S.

Playing career
- 1974–1975: New Hampshire
- Position: Forward

Coaching career (HC unless noted)
- 1985–2012: St. Lawrence

Head coaching record
- Overall: 482–418–75 (.533)

Accomplishments and honors

Championships
- 1988 ECAC Champion; 1988 ECAC Tournament champion 1989 ECAC tournament champion 1992 ECAC tournament champion 2000 ECAC Champion; 2000 ECAC tournament champion 2001 ECAC tournament champion 2007 ECAC Champion

Awards
- 1989 ECAC Coach of the Year; 1989 Spencer Penrose Award; 1996 ECAC Coach of the Year; 1999 ECAC Coach of the Year; 2000 Spencer Penrose Award; 2007 Tim Taylor Award

Joe Marsh (born October 26, 1951) is an American retired ice hockey coach who worked as the head coach of the St. Lawrence Saints men's ice hockey from 1985 to 2012.

== Early life ==
Marsh was born in Lynn, Massachusetts. He played collegiate hockey with the New Hampshire Wildcats men's ice hockey team.

== Career ==
Marsh was the head coach of the St. Lawrence Saints men's ice hockey team from 1985 through the end of the 2011–12 season. Marsh led the Saints to an NCAA tournament berth in his second year and a runner-up finish the following season, St. Lawrence's first Frozen Four appearance in 26 years. Over the next 26 seasons, Marsh became the most successful head coach in school history, accumulating 482 wins, two conference regular season titles, five conference tournament titles, eight conference championship appearances, and eight NCAA tournament appearances.

== Head coaching record ==
Record table
Season	Team	Overall	Conference	Standing	Postseason
St. Lawrence Saints (ECAC Hockey) (1985–2012)
1985–86	St. Lawrence	16–15–0	10–11–0	7th	ECAC quarterfinals
1986–87	St. Lawrence	24–11–0	15–7–0	3rd	NCAA regional quarterfinals
1987–88	St. Lawrence	29–9–0	18–4–0	t-1st	NCAA runner-up
1988–89	St. Lawrence	29–7–0	18–4–0	2nd	NCAA regional quarterfinals
1989–90	St. Lawrence	13–15–4	12–8–2	5th	ECAC quarterfinals
1990–91	St. Lawrence	21–13–1	15–6–1	t-2nd	ECAC runner-up
1991–92	St. Lawrence	22–10–2	15–6–1	t-2nd	NCAA regional semifinals
1992–93	St. Lawrence	17–12–3	12–8–2	6th	ECAC quarterfinals
1993–94	St. Lawrence	10–21–0	8–14–0	10th	ECAC Preliminary Round
1994–95	St. Lawrence	15–17–1	10–12–0	8th	ECAC Preliminary Round
1995–96	St. Lawrence	20–12–3	15–4–3	3rd	ECAC quarterfinals
1996–97	St. Lawrence	10–20–5	5–12–5	9th	ECAC Preliminary Round
1997–98	St. Lawrence	9–20–4	8–12–2	t-9th	ECAC first round
1998–99	St. Lawrence	23–13–3	15–4–3	2nd	NCAA regional quarterfinals
1999–00	St. Lawrence	27–8–2	16–3–1	1st	NCAA Frozen Four
2000–01	St. Lawrence	20–13–4	13–6–3	2nd	NCAA regional quarterfinals
2001–02	St. Lawrence	11–21–2	9–11–2	t-9th	ECAC first round
2002–03	St. Lawrence	11–21–5	7–12–3	9th	ECAC first round
2003–04	St. Lawrence	14–21–6	7–12–3	10th	ECAC quarterfinals
2004–05	St. Lawrence	17–19–2	9–12–1	7th	ECAC quarterfinals
2005–06	St. Lawrence	21–17–2	12–9–1	5th	ECAC quarterfinals
2006–07	St. Lawrence	23–14–2	16–5–1	1st	NCAA regional semifinals
2007–08	St. Lawrence	13–20–4	7–13–2	9th	ECAC first round
2008–09	St. Lawrence	21–12–5	11–7–4	4th	ECAC Third Place (win)
2009–10	St. Lawrence	19–16–7	9–8–5	t-5th	ECAC Third Place (loss)
2010–11	St. Lawrence	13–22–5	6–15–1	11th	ECAC quarterfinals
2011–12	St. Lawrence	14–19–3	10–11–1	8th	ECAC first round
St. Lawrence:		482–418–75			
Total:		482–418–75			
National champion Postseason invitational champion Conference regular season champion Conference regular season and conference tournament champion Division regular season champion Division regular season and conference tournament champion Conference tournament champion

== See also ==
- List of college men's ice hockey coaches with 400 wins

Awards and achievements
Preceded by Frank Anzalone; Dick Umile	Spencer Penrose Award; 1988–89; 1999–00	Succeeded by Terry Slater; Dean Blais
Preceded by Bill Cleary/Mike Gilligan; Bob Gaudet; Tim Taylor; Bob Gaudet	Tim Taylor Award; 1988–89; 1995–96; 1998–99; 2006–07	Succeeded by Terry Slater; Stan Moore; Don Vaughan; Guy Gadowsky
