= Tim Taylor Award (ECAC Hockey) =

- Sport: Ice hockey
- Awarded for: The Coach of the Year in ECAC Hockey

History
- First award: 1987
- Most wins: Mike Schafer (5); Rand Pecknold (5)
- Most recent: Reid Cashman

The Tim Taylor Award is an annual award given out at the conclusion of the ECAC Hockey regular season to the best coach in the conference as voted by the coaches of each ECAC team.

The Coach of the Year was first awarded in 1987 and every year thereafter until 2007 when it was renamed in honor of long-time Yale head coach Tim Taylor after he had retired following the 2005–06 season.

The vote for the award was split in its second year, but not since. (as of 2020)

== Award winners ==
Year	Winner	School
1986–87	Tim Taylor	Yale
1987–88	Bill Cleary	Harvard
1987–88	Mike Gilligan	Vermont
1988–89	Joe Marsh	St. Lawrence
1989–90	Terry Slater	Colgate
1990–91	Mark Morris	Clarkson
1991–92	Tim Taylor	Yale
1992–93	Roger Demment	Dartmouth
1993–94	Bruce Delventhal	Union
1994–95	Bob Gaudet	Brown
1995–96	Joe Marsh	St. Lawrence
1996–97	Stan Moore	Union
1997–98	Tim Taylor	Yale
1998–99	Joe Marsh	St. Lawrence
1999–00	Don Vaughan	Colgate
2000–01	Mark Morris	Clarkson
2001–02	Mike Schafer	Cornell
2002–03	Mike Schafer	Cornell
2003–04	Stan Moore	Colgate
2004–05	Mike Schafer	Cornell
2005–06	Bob Gaudet	Dartmouth

Year	Winner	School
2006–07	Joe Marsh	St. Lawrence
2007–08	Guy Gadowsky	Princeton
2008–09	Keith Allain	Yale
2009–10	Nate Leaman	Union
2010–11	Nate Leaman	Union
2011–12	Rick Bennett	Union
2012–13	Rand Pecknold	Quinnipiac
2013–14	Don Vaughan	Colgate
2014–15	Greg Carvel	St. Lawrence
2015–16	Rand Pecknold	Quinnipiac
2016–17	Rick Bennett	Union
2017–18	Mike Schafer	Cornell
2018–19	Casey Jones	Clarkson
2019–20	Mike Schafer	Cornell
2020–21	Rand Pecknold	Quinnipiac
2021–22	Rand Pecknold	Quinnipiac
2022–23	Rand Pecknold	Quinnipiac
2023–24	Reid Cashman	Dartmouth
2024–25	Jean-François Houle	Clarkson
2025–26	Reid Cashman	Dartmouth

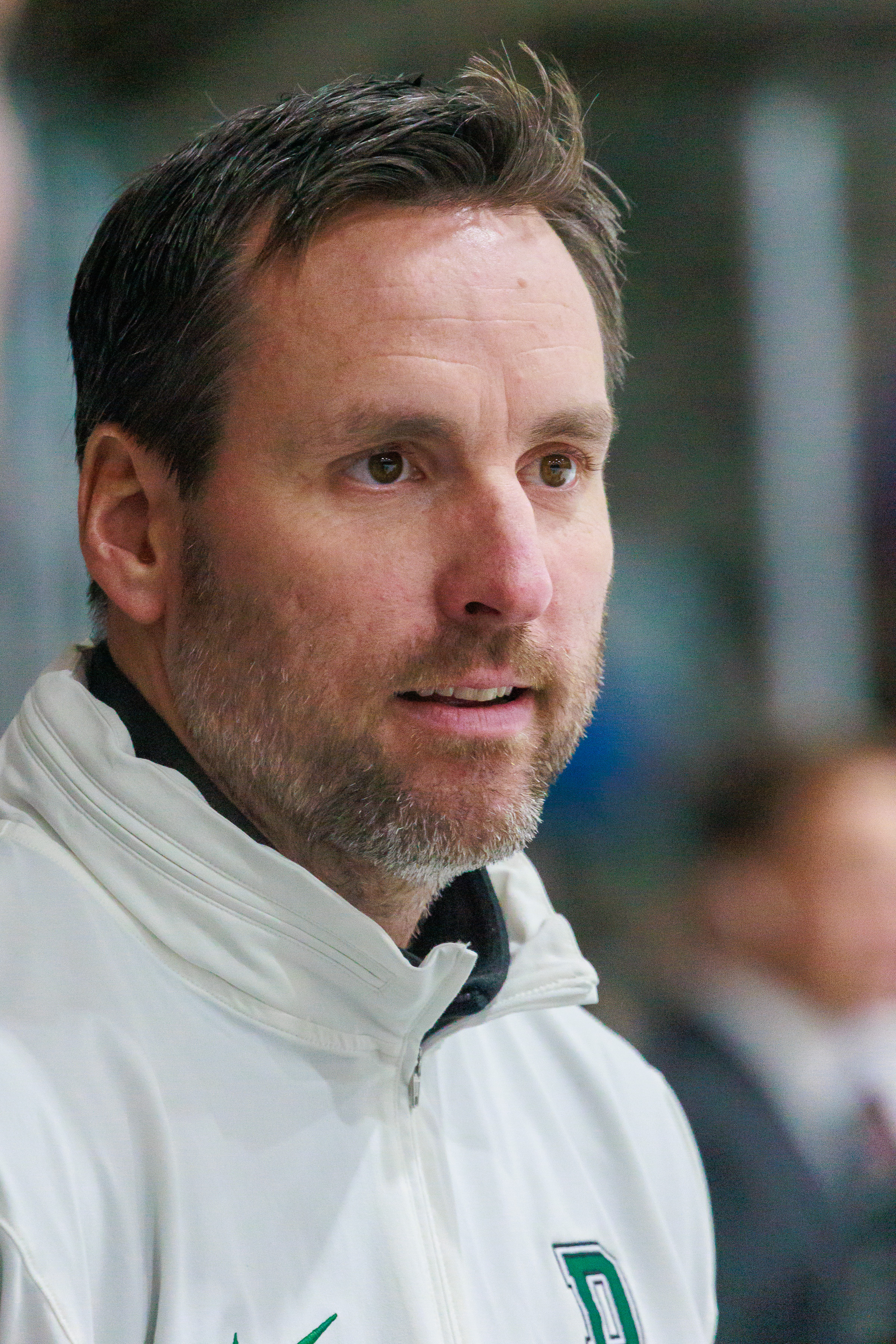
Two-time winner Reid Cashman

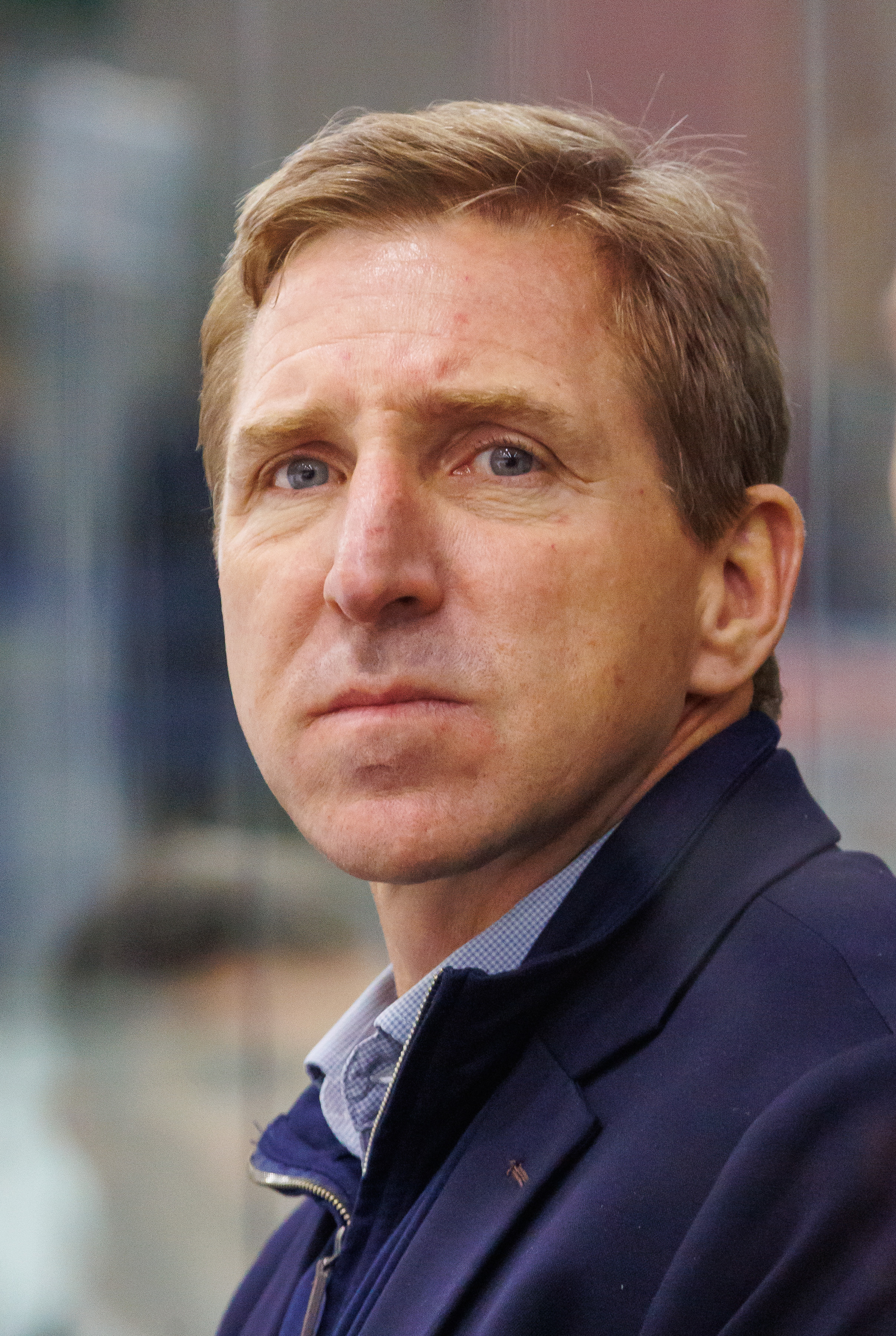
Two-time winner Nate Leaman

=== Winners by school ===
School	Winners
Union	6
Cornell	5
Quinnipiac	5
St. Lawrence	5
Clarkson	4
Colgate	4
Dartmouth	4
Yale	4
Brown	1
Harvard	1
Princeton	1
Vermont	1

=== Multiple winners ===
Recipient	Trophies
Mike Schafer	5
Rand Pecknold	5
Joe Marsh	4
Tim Taylor	3
Rick Bennett	2
Reid Cashman	2
Bob Gaudet	2
Nate Leaman	2
Stan Moore	2
Mark Morris	2
Don Vaughan	2

Five-time winners

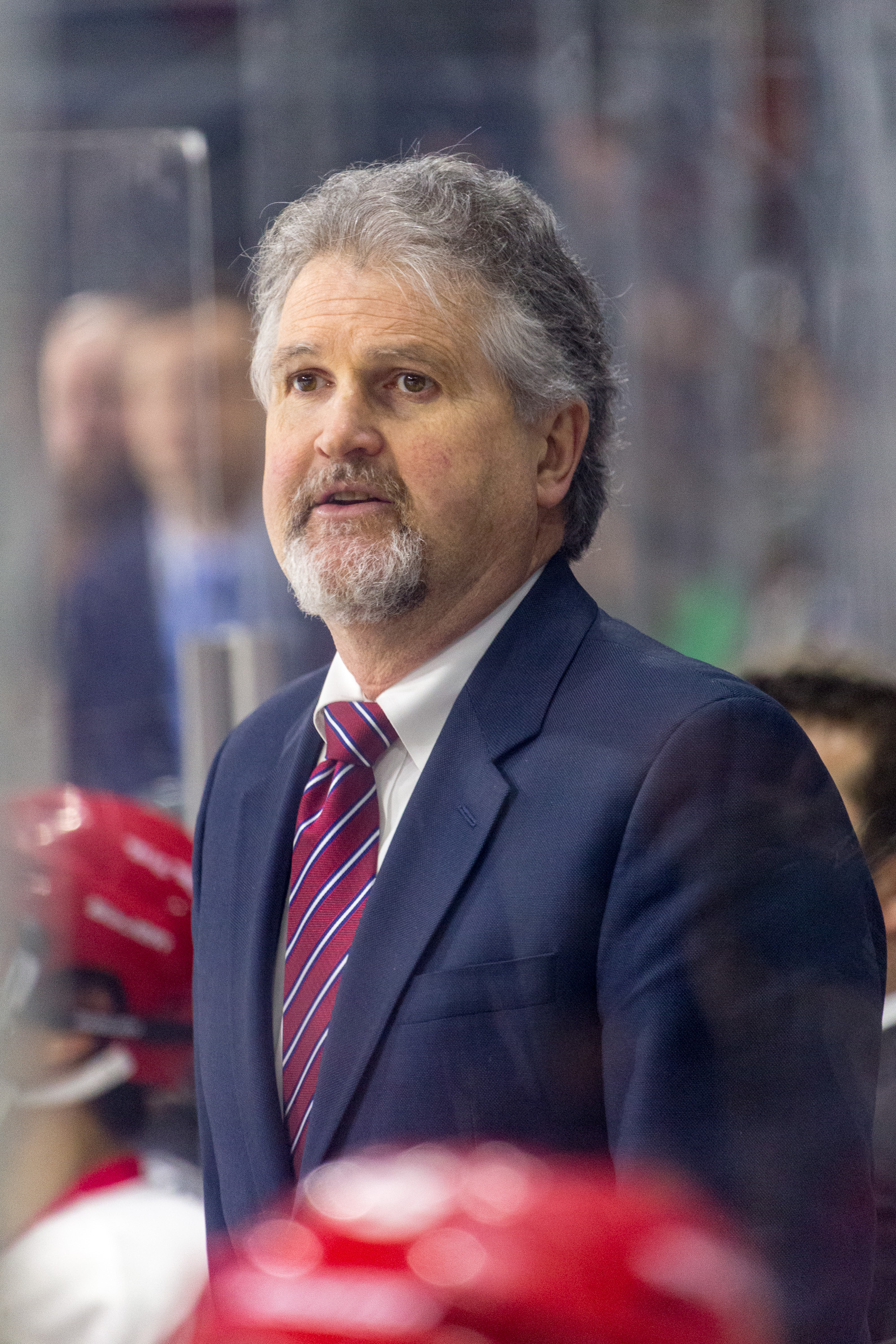
Mike Schafer of Cornell

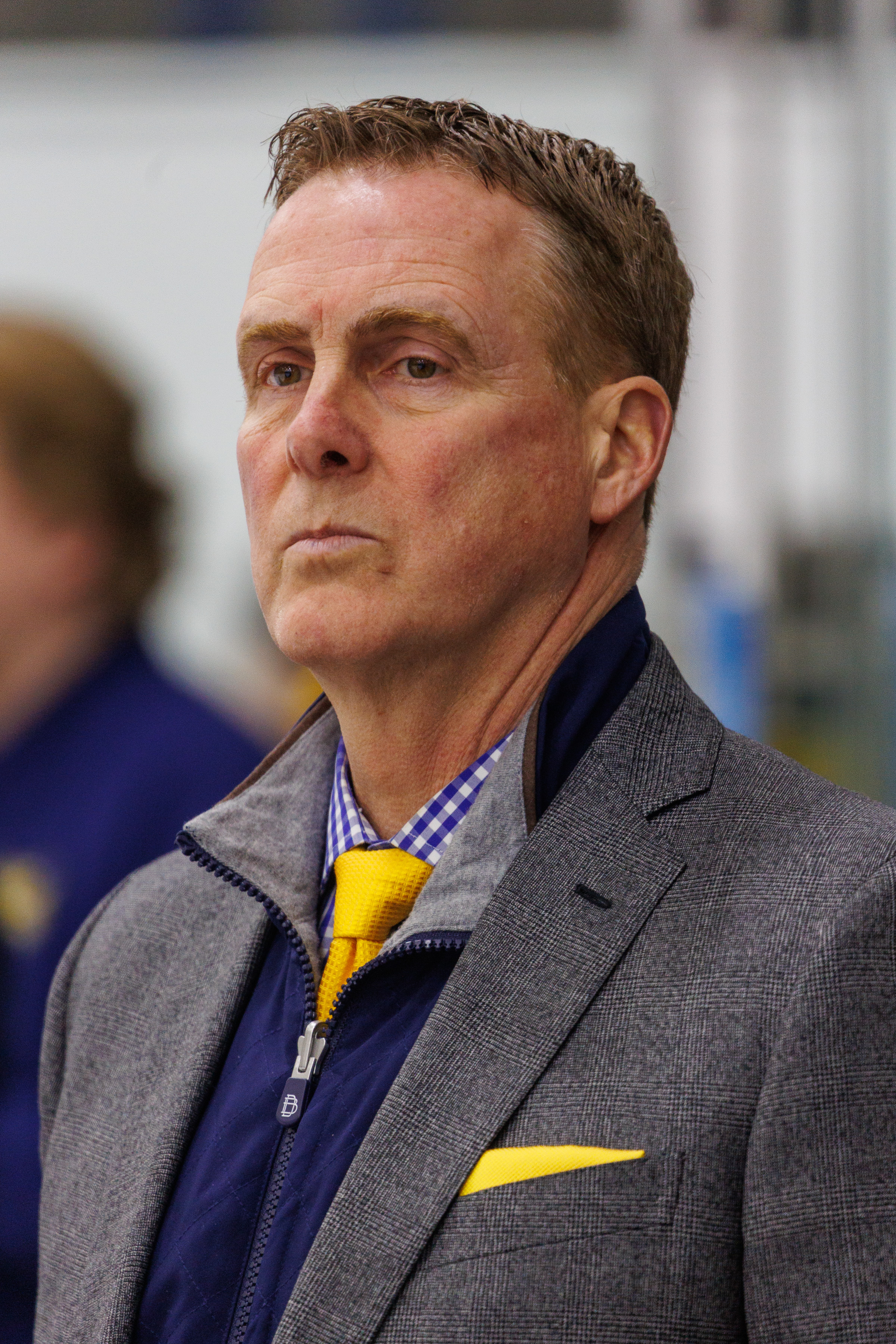
Rand Pecknold of Quinnipiac
