= Terry Slater (ice hockey) =

Canadian ice hockey player and coach

Biographical details
- Born: December 5, 1937; Kirkland Lake, Ontario, Canada
- Died: December 6, 1991 (aged 54); Syracuse, New York, USA

Playing career
- 1958–1961: St. Lawrence
- 1961–1962: Los Angeles Blades
- 1963–1964: Seattle Totems
- 1963–1965: Toledo Blades
- Position: Center

Coaching career (HC unless noted)
- 1965–1966: Toledo
- 1966–1969: Toledo Blades
- 1969–1972: Des Moines Oak Leafs
- 1972–1974: Los Angeles Sharks
- 1975–1977: Cincinnati Stingers
- 1977–1991: Colgate

Head coaching record
- Overall: 251-180-23 (.578)

Accomplishments and honors

Championships
- 1990 ECAC Hockey Regular Season Champion; 1990 ECAC Hockey Tournament Champion

Awards
- 1990 ECAC Hockey Coach of the Year Award; 1990 Spencer Penrose Award

Terry Slater (December 5, 1937 – December 6, 1991) was a Canadian ice hockey player and coach. In the World Hockey Association, he coached the teams Los Angeles Sharks and Cincinnati Stingers.

== Career ==
Born in Kirkland Lake, Ontario, Slater began his career in 1958 at St. Lawrence University, where he was a two time All American, and played hockey in the National Collegiate Athletic Association. In his first season, he scored 50 points in 22 games. After two more seasons at St. Lawrence University, Slater was in 1961 in the former professional hockey league Western Hockey League and signed a contract with the Los Angeles Blades. In his only season he scored 17 goals, 24 assists and scored 41 points in 52 games. In 1963 he continued his career with the Seattle Totems. That same year he left the team and went to the Toledo Blades in the International Hockey League. After two years, 125 games and 106 points scorer for the Toledo Blades, he finished his playing career at an early stage.

His coaching career began with the University of Toledo in 1965 where he coached the Rockets inaugural season and went 19-1. For the 1967/68 season returned to the Toledo Blades and received a contract as coach of the team. Two years later he accepted a job at the Des Moines Oak Leafs, where he worked again as a head coach, reaching the team twice in a row to qualify for the playoffs. In season 1972/73 he was appointed to the newly formed World Hockey Association and became a coach with the Los Angeles Sharks. In his first season with the team he made the move into the playoffs and failed in the first round against the Houston Aeros. The following season he was sacked after 19 games since the team played with five wins and 14 defeats of expectations. For the 1975/76 season Slater took a job with the Cincinnati Stingers, where he worked as a coach. In the first season, the playoffs have been missed in the following season divided the team in the first round by the Indianapolis Racers.

During the 1977-78 season he took a job with the Kalamazoo Wings in the International Hockey League, where he replaced Bob Lemieux during the season as a coach. He then coached the hockey team of Colgate University in the ECAC to 1991. In 1990 he coached the Red Raiders to a school record 31-6-1, winning the championship of the ECAC. As a result, the team took part in the championship of the NCAA and lost to Wisconsin.

Twenty months after the run to the finals Slater suffered a severe stroke while at home. He was transported to Crouse Irving Memorial Hospital where he died 4 days later, just after his 54th birthday.

In 2013, the documentary "The General" was made, which chronicles Terry Slater and the improbable story of the 1989-1990 Colgate University Men's Ice Hockey Team run to the ECAC Championship and Division I NCAA Finals. Featured in the documentary were players Karl Clauss, Joel Gardner, Steve Spott, Grant Slater, as well as assistant coach Brian Durocher and Student Assistant Eric Opin, retired SID Bob Cornell, and numerous Village of Hamilton, New York residents.

== Career statistics ==
			Regular season					Playoffs
Season	Team	League	GP	G	A	Pts	PIM	GP	G	A	Pts	PIM
1958–59	St. Lawrence	Tri-State League	22	21	29	50	4	—	—	—	—	—
1959–60	St. Lawrence	Tri-State League	34	34	38	72	4	—	—	—	—	—
1960–61	St. Lawrence	Tri-State League	20	20	25	45	25	—	—	—	—	—
1961–62	Los Angeles Blades	WHL	52	17	24	41	15	—	—	—	—	—
1963–64	Seattle Totems	WHL	13	0	0	0	0	—	—	—	—	—
1963–64	Toledo Blades	IHL	38	15	16	31	31	13	3	4	7	4
1964–65	Toledo Blades	IHL	70	26	39	65	32	4	2	1	3	0
NCAA totals			76	75	92	167	33	—	—	—	—	—

== Head coaching record ==
=== WHA ===
Team	Year		Regular season							Postseason
Team	Year	G	W	L	T	OTL	SOL	Pts	Finish	Result
Los Angeles Sharks	1972-73	78	37	35	6	0	0	80	3rd in West	Lost in 1st round
Los Angeles Sharks	1973–74	19	5	14	0	0	0	(10)	6th in West	
Cincinnati Stingers	1975-76	80	35	44	1	0	0	71	4th in East	Did not qualify
Cincinnati Stingers	1976–77	81	39	37	5	0	0	83	2nd in East	Lost in 1st round

=== Other leagues ===
Team	Year	League	Regular season								Postseason
Team	Year	League	G	W	L	T	OTL	SOL	Pts	Finish	Result
University of Toledo	1965–66	MCHA	20	19	1	0	0	0	38	MCHA Champions	MCHA Tournament Champions
Toledo Blades	1967–68	IHL	72	29	29	14	0	0	72	NA	Did not qualify
Toledo Blades	1968–69	IHL	72	41	23	8	0	0	90	NA	Lost in 2nd round
Des Moines Oak Leafs	1969–70	IHL	72	31	33	8	0	0	70	NA	Lost in 2nd round
Des Moines Oak Leafs	1971-72	IHL	58	35	34	3	0	0	73	NA	Lost in 1st round
8.5
Total	1965-91		866	437	368	61	0	0			

=== College ===
Record table
Season	Team	Overall	Conference	Standing	Postseason
Colgate Red Raiders (ECAC Hockey) (1977–1992)
1977–78	Colgate	5-22-1	4-20-1	17th	
1978–79	Colgate	15-13-0	7-13-0	12th	
1979–80	Colgate	18-12-1	10-10-1	t-7th	ECAC Quarterfinals
1980–81	Colgate	21-12-2	12-7-1	3rd	NCAA Quarterfinals
1981–82	Colgate	19-10-1	11-8-1	7th	ECAC Quarterfinals
1982–83	Colgate	15-10-3	9-9-2	10th	
1983–84	Colgate	20-14-1	10-9-1	7th	ECAC Quarterfinals
1984–85	Colgate	14-18-0	8-12-0	7th	ECAC Quarterfinals
1985–86	Colgate	15-15-2	9-11-1	8th	ECAC Quarterfinals
1986–87	Colgate	23-9-1	15-6-1	2nd	ECAC Quarterfinals
1987–88	Colgate	18-11-3	13-8-1	5th	ECAC Quarterfinals
1988–89	Colgate	19-10-2	15-6-1	3rd	ECAC Quarterfinals
1989–90	Colgate	31-6-1	18-3-1	1st	NCAA Runner-Up
1990–91	Colgate	16-12-4	9-9-4	7th	ECAC Quarterfinals
1991–92 †	Colgate	2-6-1 †	1-2-0 †		
Colgate:		251-180-23	151-133-16		
Total:		251-180-23			
National champion Postseason invitational champion Conference regular season champion Conference regular season and conference tournament champion Division regular season champion Division regular season and conference tournament champion Conference tournament champion

† Slater died during the season

== Awards and honours ==
Award	Year
AHCA East All-American	1959–60, 1960–61
NCAA All-Tournament Second Team	1960, 1961

Awards and achievements
Preceded by Joe Marsh	Spencer Penrose Award; 1989–90	Succeeded by Rick Comley
Preceded by Joe Marsh	Tim Taylor Award; 1989–90	Succeeded by Mark Morris
