= Tim Taylor (ice hockey coach) =

American ice hockey player and coach

Biographical details
- Born: March 26, 1942; Boston, Massachusetts, U.S.
- Died: April 27, 2013 (aged 71); Branford, Connecticut, U.S.

Playing career
- 1960–1963: Harvard
- Position: Center

Coaching career (HC unless noted)
- 1969–1976: Harvard (assistant)
- 1976–1983: Yale
- 1984: US Olympic Team (assistant)
- 1984–1993: Yale
- 1989: Team USA
- 1991: Team USA
- 1994: US Olympic Team
- 1994–2006: Yale
- 2008: Team USA (assistant)
- 2010: Team USA (assistant)

Head coaching record
- Overall: 337–433–55

Accomplishments and honors

Championships
- ECAC Regular Season Championship (1998)

Awards
- 1987 ECAC Hockey Coach of the Year; 1992 ECAC Hockey Coach of the Year; 1998 ECAC Hockey Coach of the Year; 1998 Spencer Penrose Award

Timothy Blake Taylor (March 26, 1942 – April 27, 2013) was an American ice hockey head coach. He was born in Boston, Massachusetts and grew up in South Natick, Massachusetts. He was the long-time head coach of the Yale Bulldogs from 1976-77 until his forced retirement in 2005-06 season. He twice took leaves of absence from his collegiate duties to coach the US Olympic Team (1984 and 1994) as well as serving as Team USA's head coach for the 1989 World Ice Hockey Championships and the 1991 Canada Cup. At the time of his retirement Taylor had served as Yale's head ice hockey coach for longer than anyone else, earning more wins (337) and losses (433) for the Bulldogs than all others. The respect Taylor had earned over his career was exemplified by ECAC Hockey renaming its annual coaches award in his honor shortly after his retirement as well as the NCAA renaming its national rookie-of-the-Year award after him a few months after his death. In 2015 he was posthumously awarded the Legends of College Hockey Award, by the Hobey Baker Memorial Award Committee.

== Career ==
=== Player ===
Tim Taylor began his collegiate hockey career as a center for Harvard eventually rising to become captain in his senior season and leading the Crimson to its first ECAC regular season and conference tournament championships in 1963. After graduating with a degree in English, Taylor sought a spot on the 1964 US Olympic Team to defend its first Gold medal, but was ultimately cut from the roster shortly before the games began. After the disappointment, Taylor joined the Waterloo Blackhawks of the USHL (then a semi-professional league), suiting up for them from 1964 thru 1969, excluding a brief stint for the 1965 US National Team and the Warroad Lakers later that year. During the 1968–69 season, Taylor made his way back to the Northeast, briefly playing for the Manchester Blackhawks of the New England Hockey League before accepting an assistant coaching position with his alma mater.

=== Coach ===
His first coaching job didn't last very long as Taylor left Harvard after the 1969-70 season to continue his playing career. Two years later he returned to coaching for good, helping the newly appointed Bill Cleary reach the frozen four in both 1974 and 1975. A year later, after recording the two worst records in Yale's history, Paul Lufkin was relieved of his duties and Taylor was tabbed as his successor.

Behind the bench for his alma mater's arch-rival, Taylor swiftly returned Yale to respectability, shepherding the team to a winning season by his third year. Though Taylor had no postseason success through his first seven campaigns he was nonetheless invited to join Team USA's staff for the 1984 Winter Olympics. Taylor turned over his position at Yale to Mike Gilligan for the 1983-84 season to help team USA defend its second gold medal. The '84 team, however, was not able to capture the same magic as their predecessors and finished a disappointing 7th. Taylor returned to Yale the following year and the Bulldogs responded by playing two of the best years for the school since World War II posting 19- and then 20-win seasons, including Yale's first ever postseason victory in the 25th year of the ECAC Tournament. While the Bulldogs' fortunes declined after that, Taylor was asked to be the head coach for Team USA at the 1989 World Ice Hockey Championships. Once again, the Americans' had a poor showing, finishing 6th out of 8 teams. Despite the lack of international success, Taylor was behind the bench less than two years later for Team USA, this time in the 1991 Canada Cup, where the Americans had a much better fate as runners-up to the champion Canadian team.

Once again Yale's records improved after Taylor's international showing, posting winning seasons for the two years after the Canada Cup before Taylor took a second season off from Yale, this time to be the head coach of the US Olympic Team at the 1994 Winter Olympics. With Dan Poliziani standing in for him in New Haven for 1993-94. Taylor was able to get Team USA into the championship round with a 1-1-3 record, but they were soundly defeated by eventual Bronze medalist Finland in the quarterfinals. After 1994 Taylor remained exclusively with his collegiate position until his retirement. 1997-98 ended up being his best season as he earned the only regular season crown of his career and only NCAA berth (Yale lost 0–4 to Ohio State in its first game).

Though Taylor retired from his position at Yale following the 2005–06 season, he remained active in hockey, serving as an assistant coach for Team USA's under-18 squads in 2008 and 2010 as well as team manager for the World Junior Championship teams in 2011 and 2012.

Taylor's health began to decline in later years and he was eventually diagnosed with cancer. He died on April 27, 2013, but not before he was able to witness Yale, the team he had coached for almost three decades, win its first national title under former assistant Keith Allain, which it was able to do two weeks before Taylor's death.

== Head coaching record ==
=== College ===
Record table
Season	Team	Overall	Conference	Standing	Postseason
Yale Bulldogs (ECAC Hockey) (1976–2006)
1976-77	Yale	6-18-1	5-17-1	15th	
1977-78	Yale	12-13-1	12-13-1	9th	
1978-79	Yale	13-12-2	12-9-1	7th	ECAC Quarterfinals
1979-80	Yale	7-16-3	5-14-3	15th	
1980-81	Yale	13-12-1	11-9-1	9th	
1981-82	Yale	15-10-1	11-9-1	9th	
1982-83	Yale	14-14-0	12-9-2	8th	ECAC Quarterfinals
1984-85	Yale	19-11-1	13-7-1	5th	ECAC Quarterfinals
1985-86	Yale	20-10-0	15-6-0	2nd	ECAC 3rd-Place Game (Loss)
1986-87	Yale	15-12-3	13-9-0	4th	ECAC 3rd-Place Game (Loss)
1987-88	Yale	6-20-0	6-16-0	10th	
1988-89	Yale	11-19-1	10-12-0	7th	ECAC Quarterfinals
1989-90	Yale	8-20-1	6-15-1	10th	
1990-91	Yale	11-16-2	9-11-2	t-8th	ECAC Quarterfinals
1991-92	Yale	13-7-7	11-4-7	4th	ECAC Quarterfinals
1992-93	Yale	15-12-4	12-7-3	5th	ECAC Quarterfinals
1994-95	Yale	8-17-3	6-13-3	12th	
1995-96	Yale	7-23-1	4-17-1	12th	
1996-97	Yale	10-19-3	6-14-2	10th	ECAC Quarterfinals
1997-98	Yale	23-9-3	17-4-1	1st	NCAA Regional Quarterfinals
1998-99	Yale	13-14-4	11-7-4	t-5th	ECAC First Round
1999-00	Yale	9-16-5	6-11-4	9th	ECAC First Round
2000-01	Yale	14-6-1	10-11-1	8th	ECAC First Round
2001-02	Yale	10-19-2	9-11-2	t-9th	ECAC First Round
2002-03	Yale	18-14-0	13-9-0	4th	ECAC Quarterfinals
2003-04	Yale	12-19-0	10-12-0	7th	ECAC First Round
2004-05	Yale	5-25-2	3-18-1	12th	ECAC First Round
2005-06	Yale	10-20-3	6-14-2	11th	ECAC Quarterfinals
Yale:		337-433-55	264-308-45		
Total:		337-433-55			
National champion Postseason invitational champion Conference regular season champion Conference regular season and conference tournament champion Division regular season champion Division regular season and conference tournament champion Conference tournament champion

== Awards and honors ==
Award	Year
All-ECAC Hockey First Team	1961–62; 1962–63
ECAC Hockey All-Tournament First Team	1962
ECAC Hockey All-Tournament Second Team	1963

Awards and achievements
Preceded by Award Created; Mark Morris; Stan Moore	Tim Taylor Award; 1986–87; 1991–92; 1997–98	Succeeded by Bill Cleary/Mike Gilligan; Roger Demment; Joe Marsh
Preceded by Dean Blais	Spencer Penrose Award; 1997–98	Succeeded by Dick Umile
Preceded by Jack Parker	Hobey Baker Legends of College Hockey Award; 2015	Succeeded by Bill Selman
