= 1984 ECAC Hockey men's ice hockey tournament =

1984 ECAC Men's ice hockey tournament
- Dates: March 3–10, 1984
- Teams: 8
- Finals site: Boston Garden; Boston, Massachusetts
- Champions: Rensselaer (1st title)
- Winning coach: Mike Addesa (1st title)
- MVP: Adam Oates (Rensselaer)
- ECAC Men's Ice Hockey Tournaments

The 1984 ECAC Hockey Men's Ice Hockey Tournament was the 23rd tournament in league history. It was played between March 2 and March 10, 1984. Quarterfinal games were played at home team campus sites, while the 'final four' games were played at the Boston Garden in Boston, Massachusetts. By winning the tournament, Rensselaer received the ECAC's automatic bid to the 1984 NCAA Division I Men's Ice Hockey Tournament.

== Format ==
The tournament featured three rounds of play. The three teams that were division champions automatically qualified for the tournament while the remaining five seeds were given to the teams with the highest winning percentage. The top four seeds were given out to the three division champions and the top qualifier and assorted based upon winning percentage. The remaining four seeds were assigned to the other qualifiers and assorted based upon winning percentage. In the quarterfinals the first seed and eighth seed, the second seed and seventh seed, the third seed and sixth seed and the fourth seed and fifth seed played a two-game series to determine the winner. In the two games no overtime was permitted and if the two teams remained tied after the two games then a 10-minute mini-game would be played where a sudden-death overtime was allowed if the scheduled time did not produce a victor. After the opening round every series becomes a single-elimination game. In the semifinals, the highest seed plays the lowest remaining seed while the two remaining teams play with the winners advancing to the championship game and the losers advancing to the third place game. The tournament champion receives an automatic bid to the 1984 NCAA Division I Men's Ice Hockey Tournament.

== Conference standings ==
Note: GP = Games played; W = Wins; L = Losses; T = Ties; Pct. = Winning percentage; GF = Goals for; GA = Goals against

1983–84 ECAC Hockey standings
	Conference							Overall					
	GP	W	L	T	Pct.	GF	GA	GP	W	L	T	GF	GA
East Region
Boston College	21	15	6	0	.714	88	72	39	26	13	0	175	141
Boston University	21	15	6	0	.714	75	63	40	28	11	1	167	120
New Hampshire	21	13	8	0	.619	94	73	38	20	17	1	169	139
Providence	21	12	7	2	.619	84	78	35	21	12	2	143	122
Northeastern	21	10	10	1	.500	104	97	29	16	12	1	144	124
Maine	21	7	14	0	.333	75	109	34	14	20	0	130	161
West Region
Rensselaer†*	20	17	3	0	.850	117	53	38	32	6	0	218	113
Clarkson	20	14	6	0	.700	97	63	34	21	11	2	156	110
Colgate	20	10	9	1	.525	83	89	35	20	14	1	171	149
St. Lawrence	20	10	10	0	.500	108	80	32	19	13	0	175	126
Vermont	20	6	13	1	.325	89	97	29	10	18	1	127	132
Ivy Region
Harvard	21	10	9	1	.524	68	61	27	10	14	3	84	90
Yale	21	10	10	1	.500	76	73	26	12	13	1	91	92
Cornell	21	9	12	0	.429	83	94	26	11	15	0	106	113
Brown	21	5	15	1	.262	59	109	26	6	19	1	70	135
Princeton	21	5	15	1	.262	81	103	25	6	18	1	101	126
Dartmouth	21	3	18	0	.143	58	119	26	3	23	0	71	148
Independent
Army^	-	-	-	-	-	-	-	34	28	5	1	241	104
Lowell^	-	-	-	-	-	-	-	34	15	16	3	138	164
Championship: Rensselaer † indicates conference regular season champion * indicates conference tournament champion^ Both Army and Lowell had been accepted into ECAC Hockey but had not begun a conference schedule

== Bracket ==
Teams are reseeded after the first round

Quarterfinals; March 2–3
1	Rensselaer	8	5	—
8	Colgate	5	3	—
2	Boston College	6	3	1
7	Providence	3	5	0
(Pairings are reseeded after the first round)
3	Boston University	3	5	1*
6	New Hampshire	8	2	0
4	Harvard	1	2	—
5	Clarkson	3	2	—

Semifinals; March 9
1	Rensselaer	5
5	Clarkson	1
2	Boston College	4
3	Boston University	6

Championship; March 10
1	Rensselaer	5
3	Boston University	2
Third Place
2	Boston College	1
5	Clarkson	3

Note: * denotes overtime period(s)

=== Quarterfinals ===
==== (1) Rensselaer vs. (8) Colgate ====
March 2	Rensselaer	8 – 5	Colgate	Houston Field House

March 3	Rensselaer	5 – 3	Colgate	Houston Field House

Rensselaer won series 2–0

==== (2) Boston College vs. (7) Providence ====
March 2	Boston College	6 – 3	Providence	McHugh Forum

March 3	Boston College	3 – 5	Providence	McHugh Forum

March 3	Boston College	1 – 0 (mini)	Providence	McHugh Forum

Boston College won series 2–1

==== (3) Boston University vs. (6) New Hampshire ====
March 2	Boston University	3 – 8	New Hampshire	Walter Brown Arena

March 3	Boston University	5 – 2	New Hampshire	Walter Brown Arena

March 3	Boston University	1 – 0 (mini)	OT	New Hampshire	Walter Brown Arena

Boston University won series 2–1

==== (4) Harvard vs. (5) Clarkson ====
March 2	Harvard	1 – 3	Clarkson	Bright Hockey Center

March 3	Harvard	2 – 2	Clarkson	Bright Hockey Center

Clarkson won series 1–0–1

=== Semifinals ===
==== (1) Rensselaer vs. (5) Clarkson ====
March 9	Rensselaer	5 – 4	Clarkson	Boston Garden

==== (2) Boston College vs. (3) Boston University ====
March 9	Boston College	4 – 6	Boston University	Boston Garden

=== Third Place ===
==== (2) Boston College vs. (5) Clarkson ====
March 10	Boston College	1 – 3	Clarkson	Boston Garden

=== Championship ===
==== (1) Rensselaer vs. (3) Boston University ====
March 10	Rensselaer	5 – 2	Boston University	Boston Garden

== Tournament awards ==
=== All-Tournament Team ===
None

=== MOP ===
- Adam Oates (Rensselaer)
