= Stan Moore (ice hockey) =

American ice hockey player

Biographical details
- Born: Massena, New York, U.S.

Playing career
- 1974–1978: Oswego State
- Position: Left wing

Coaching career (HC unless noted)
- 1978–1985: Potsdam State (volunteer assistant)
- 1985–1988: Brown (assistant)
- 1988–1992: Providence (assistant)
- 1992–1996: Colgate (assistant)
- 1996–1998: Union
- 1998–2003: Colgate (assistant)
- 2003–2004: Colgate (interim)
- 2004–2005: Colgate (assistant)
- 2005–2011: Providence (assistant)
- 2011–2012: Colby (interim)
- 2012–2013: Bridgton Academy
- 2018–2019: SV Kaltern
- 2019–2020: Bowdoin (assistant)

Head coaching record
- Overall: 53–62–13 (.465)

Accomplishments and honors

Championships
- 2004 Hockey East regular season champion 2019 Italian Hockey League; 2019 Coppa Italia

Awards
- 1997 ECAC Hockey Coach of the Year Award; 2004 ECAC Hockey Coach of the Year Award

Stan Moore is an American retired ice hockey player and coach.

== Early life and education ==
Moore was born in Massena, New York. He graduated from the State University of New York at Oswego in 1978.

== Career ==
After graduating from college, Moore embarked on a coaching career, taking him to several programs throughout the Northeast. While he spent the majority of his career as an assistant coach, Moore worked as the head coach of Union for two seasons, and then as an interim coach for both Colgate and Colby, each for only one season. Despite the short time he spent as a head coach, Moore has received the ECAC Hockey Coach of the Year Award twice and won a conference regular season title.

For the 2018–2019 season, Moore coached the Italian Hockey League second tier team of Caldaro, which he led to both league and Coppa Italia wins.

== Head coaching record ==
Record table
Season	Team	Overall	Conference	Standing	Postseason
Union Skating Dutchmen (ECAC Hockey) (1996–1998)
1996–97	Union	18–13–3	11–8–3	t-5th	ECAC Quarterfinals
1997–98	Union	6–22–4	4–15–3	12th	
Union:		24–35–7	15–23–6		
Colgate Raiders (ECAC Hockey) (2003–2004)
2003–04	Colgate	22–12–5	14–6–2	1st	ECAC third-place game (win)
Colgate:		22–12–5			
Colby Mules (NESCAC) (2011–2012)
2011–12	Colby	7–15–1	4–13–1	10th	
Colby:		7–15–1	4–13–1		
Total:		53–62–13			
National champion Postseason invitational champion Conference regular season champion Conference regular season and conference tournament champion Division regular season champion Division regular season and conference tournament champion Conference tournament champion

Awards and achievements
Preceded by Joe Marsh; Mike Schafer	Tim Taylor Award; 1996–97; 2003–04	Succeeded by Tim Taylor; Mike Schafer
