= 1995 ECAC Hockey men's ice hockey tournament =

Men's hockey tournament

1995 ECAC Men's ice hockey tournament
- Dates: March 7–18, 1995
- Teams: 10
- Finals site: Olympic Arena; Lake Placid, New York
- Champions: Rensselaer (3rd title)
- Winning coach: Dan Fridgen (1st title)
- MVP: Mike Tamburro (Rensselaer)
- ECAC Men's Ice Hockey Tournaments

The 1995 ECAC Hockey Men's Ice Hockey Tournament was the 34th tournament in league history. It was played between March 7 and March 18, 1995. Preliminary and quarterfinal games were played at home team campus sites, while the 'final four' games were played at the Olympic Arena (subsequently renamed Herb Brooks Arena) in Lake Placid, New York. By winning the tournament, Rensselaer received the ECAC's automatic bid to the 1995 NCAA Division I Men's Ice Hockey Tournament.

== Format ==
The tournament featured four rounds of play. The two teams that finish below tenth place in the standings are not eligible for tournament play. In the preliminary round, the seventh and tenth seeds and the eighth and ninth seeds each play a single game to determine the final qualifying teams for the quarterfinals. In the quarterfinals the first seed and lower ranked qualifier, the second and higher ranked qualifier, the third seed and sixth seed and the fourth seed and fifth seed played a modified best-of-three series, where the first team to receive 3 points moves on. After the opening round every series becomes a single-elimination game. In the semifinals, the highest seed plays the lowest remaining seed while the two remaining teams play with the winners advancing to the championship game and the losers advancing to the third place game. The tournament champion receives an automatic bid to the 1995 NCAA Division I Men's Ice Hockey Tournament.

== Conference standings ==
Note: GP = Games played; W = Wins; L = Losses; T = Ties; PTS = Points; GF = Goals For; GA = Goals Against

1994–95 ECAC Hockey standings
	Conference							Overall					
	GP	W	L	T	PTS	GF	GA	GP	W	L	T	GF	GA
Clarkson†	22	14	5	3	31	116	70	37	23	10	4	195	125
Brown	22	13	7	2	28	78	76	30	15	12	3	108	109
Harvard	22	12	9	1	25	79	68	30	14	14	2	107	99
Colgate	22	12	9	1	25	98	78	37	20	16	1	158	144
Vermont	22	11	9	2	24	85	61	35	19	14	2	134	106
Rensselaer*	22	10	9	3	23	75	78	37	19	14	4	127	123
Princeton	22	9	10	3	21	81	83	35	18	13	4	123	117
St. Lawrence	22	10	12	0	20	83	110	33	15	17	1	116	150
Cornell	22	8	10	4	20	72	76	30	11	15	4	105	115
Union	22	6	12	4	16	70	87	29	9	16	4	100	116
Dartmouth	22	7	13	2	16	80	111	27	9	16	2	95	136
Yale	22	6	13	3	15	65	84	28	8	17	3	91	115
Championship: Rensselaer † indicates conference regular season champion * indicates conference tournament champion (Whitelaw Cup)

== Bracket ==
Teams are reseeded after the first two rounds

Preliminary Round; March 7
7	Princeton	5
10	Union	2
8	St. Lawrence	2
9	Cornell	6

Quarterfinals; March 10–12
1	Clarkson	6	7	—
9	Cornell	2	2	—
2	Brown	3	3	2
7	Princeton	4	2	3**
3	Harvard	2	1	—
6	Rensselaer	2	3	—
4	Colgate	2	2	3
5	Vermont	5	0	1

Semifinals; March 17
1	Clarkson	1
7	Princeton	2
4	Colgate	1
6	Rensselaer	2

Championship; March 18
6	Rensselaer	5
7	Princeton	1
Third Place
1	Clarkson	10
4	Colgate	5

Note: * denotes overtime period(s)

=== Preliminary round ===
==== (7) Princeton vs. (10) Union ====
March 7	Princeton	5 – 2	Union	Hobey Baker Memorial Rink

==== (8) St. Lawrence vs. (9) Cornell ====
March 7	St. Lawrence	2 – 6	Cornell	Appleton Arena

=== Quarterfinals ===
==== (1) Clarkson vs. (9) Cornell ====
March 10	Clarkson	6 – 2	Cornell	Cheel Arena

March 11	Clarkson	7 – 2	Cornell	Cheel Arena

Clarkson won series 2–0

==== (2) Brown vs. (7) Princeton ====
March 10	Brown	3 – 4	Princeton	Meehan Auditorium

March 11	Brown	3 – 2	Princeton	Meehan Auditorium

March 12	Brown	2 – 3	2OT	Princeton	Meehan Auditorium

Princeton won series 2–1

==== (3) Harvard vs. (6) Rensselaer ====
March 10	Harvard	2 – 2	OT	Rensselaer	Bright Hockey Center

March 11	Harvard	1 – 3	Rensselaer	Bright Hockey Center

Rensselaer won series 1–0–1

==== (4) Colgate vs. (5) Vermont ====
March 10	Colgate	2 – 5	Vermont	Starr Rink

March 11	Colgate	2 – 0	Vermont	Starr Rink

March 12	Colgate	3 – 1	Vermont	Starr Rink

Colgate won series 2–1

=== Semifinals ===
==== (1) Clarkson vs. (7) Princeton ====
March 17	Clarkson	1 – 2	Princeton	Olympic Arena

==== (4) Colgate vs. (6) Rensselaer ====
March 17	Colgate	1 – 2	Rensselaer	Olympic Arena

=== Third place ===
==== (1) Clarkson vs. (4) Colgate ====
March 18	Clarkson	10 – 5	Colgate	Olympic Arena

=== Championship ===
==== (6) Rensselaer vs. (7) Princeton ====
March 18	Rensselaer	5 – 1	Princeton	Olympic Arena

== Tournament awards ==
=== All-Tournament Team ===
- F Jonathan Kelly (Princeton)
- F Tim Regan (Rensselaer)
- F Chris Lipsett (Clarkson)
- D Brian Mueller (Clarkson)
- D Adam Bartell (Rensselaer)
- G Mike Tamburro* (Rensselaer)

* Most Outstanding Player(s)
