= Harvard Crimson men's ice hockey =

Men's ice hockey team of Harvard University

- Current season
- University: Harvard University
- Conference: ECAC
- First season: 1897–98
- Head coach: Rob Rassey; 1st season
- Assistant coaches: Jim Tortorella; James Marcou; Brian Robinson
- Arena: Bright-Landry Hockey Center; Boston, Massachusetts
- Colors: Crimson, white, and black

NCAA tournament champions
- 1989

NCAA tournament runner-up
- 1983, 1986

NCAA tournament Frozen Four
- 1955, 1957, 1958, 1969, 1971, 1974, 1975, 1983, 1986, 1987, 1989, 1994, 2017

NCAA tournament appearances
- 1955, 1957, 1958, 1969, 1971, 1974, 1975, 1982, 1983, 1985, 1986, 1987, 1988, 1989, 1993, 1994, 2002, 2003, 2004, 2005, 2006, 2015, 2016, 2017, 2019, 2022, 2023

Conference tournament champions
- IHA: 1903, 1904; ECAC: 1963, 1971, 1983, 1987, 1994, 2002, 2004, 2006, 2015, 2017, 2022

Conference regular season champions
- IHA: 1903, 1904, 1905, 1906, 1909; IHL: 1913, 1915, 1916, 1917; THL: 1920, 1921, 1922, 1923, 1926; Pentagonal League: 1933, 1936, 1937, 1954, 1955; ECAC: 1963, 1973, 1975, 1986, 1987, 1988, 1989, 1992, 1993, 1994, 2017

The Harvard Crimson men's ice hockey team is a National Collegiate Athletic Association (NCAA) Division I college ice hockey program that represents Harvard University. The Crimson are a member of ECAC Hockey. They play at the Bright Hockey Center in Boston, Massachusetts. The Crimson hockey team is one of the oldest college ice hockey teams in the United States, having played their first game on January 19, 1898, in a 0–6 loss to Brown.

The Crimson's archrival is the Cornell Big Red. The teams meet at least twice each season for installments of the historic Cornell–Harvard hockey rivalry.

== History ==
=== Early history ===
The Crimson hockey team was founded in 1898 making the team one of the oldest college ice hockey teams in the United States. The team played on a local pond and played their first recorded intercollegiate game against Brown on January 19, 1898, at Franklin Field in Boston. The rivalry is the oldest continuing college hockey series in the country. The Crimson lost that game 0–6 but the Brown-Harvard rivalry continued and later become US college hockey's oldest rivalry.

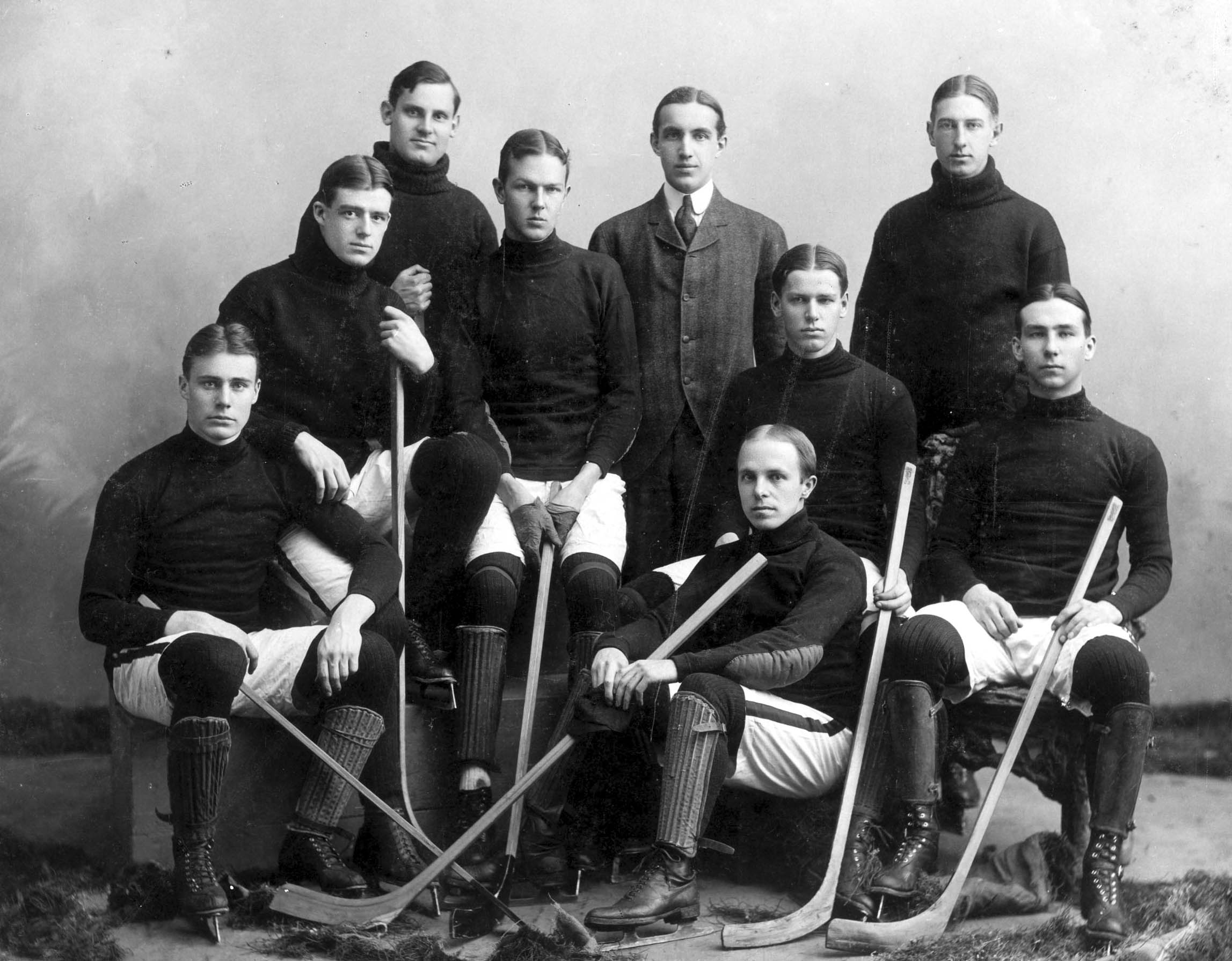
The Harvard men's ice hockey team in 1901, its fourth year of play

The two teams played again the following winter; Brown won that game by a score of 2–1. The Crimson would get their first recorded win in program history in 1900 with a 10–1 win over MIT. That same season Harvard beat Brown in back to back games. On February 26, 1900, Harvard played Yale for the first time. The game was held at the St. Nicholas Rink in New York and the 4–5 loss was the Crimson's only loss of the 1899–1900 season.

In 1903, Alfred Winsor became the team's first official head coach. The team previously used captains in a player-coach role, including Winsor who served as the Crimson's captain from 1901 to 1902. Under Winsor the team recorded a 22-game winning streak that spanned five and a half seasons and lasted from January 10, 1903, to January 19, 1907.

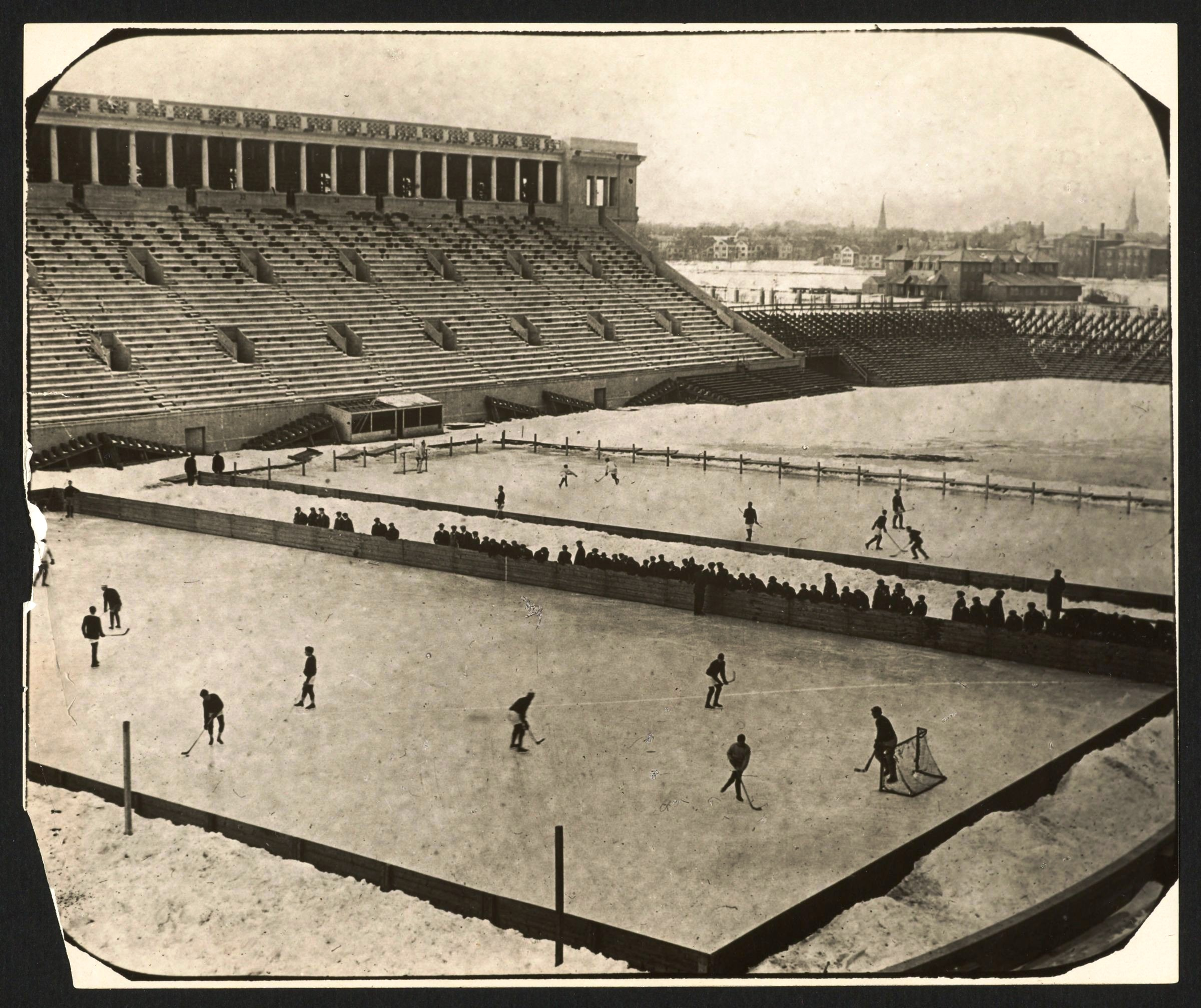
Harvard hockey game at Harvard Stadium in 1910

After beginning the program on a pond and playing on various outdoor rinks constructed on campus over the seasons, the university constructed two ice rinks inside Harvard Stadium for the 1904 season and move some old bleachers to the side of the rink. The university also began charging admission for select important games for the first time. The Crimson later moved home games to the Boston Arena, the first indoor ice rink in Boston and one of the oldest in the United States. A few years after moving into the Boston Arena, on March 14, 1913, the Harvard University Athletic Committee voted to make ice hockey a major sport in the university's athletic department. Following the 1917 season Alfred Winsor stepped down as the head coach after compiling a 124–29 record in 15 seasons as Crimson head coach. The following season was suspended because of World War I with the team resuming play in 1919.

=== 1919–1944 ===
From 1919 to 1921 the team went back to playing at outdoor rinks after the Boston Arena caught fire in the fall of 1918. The Crimson returned to the arena after it was rebuilt in the fall of 1921. Following three seasons again with no official coach, William H. Claflin became the second coach in program history in 1921 On March 7, 1923, William H. Claflin and captain George Owen '23 substituted entire forward lines instead of individuals, in the first recorded use of a line change. The idea proved successful as Harvard defeated Yale 2–1 in overtime.

On March 12, 1930, Harvard and Yale played the final game of a three-game series to end the 1930 season. The two teams split the first two games of the series. The game was called off at midnight due to blue laws despite the teams being tied in the third overtime and a record crowd in excess of 14,000. The resulting tie caused the two rivals to share the 1929–30 intercollegiate title.

Joseph Stubbs became the fourth head coach in program history starting with the 1927–28 season. He stepped down after the 1937–38 season with a record of 95–43–6 record in 11 seasons. Stubbs led the team to four seasons of double-digit wins, including two back-to-back 11-win seasons in 1930–31 and 1931–32, as well as a 12-win season in 1935–36, and leading the Crimson to a 15–1 record in 1936–37.

The Quadrangular League was created for the 1933–34 with Harvard, Yale, Princeton and Dartmouth, the league is considered the predecessor to the Ivy League. In 1936, the Council of Ivy Group Presidents agreed on the formal formation of the League, however the agreement did not go into effect until the 1955–56 season.

=== 1945–1960 ===
The program was suspended for two years during World War II but then returned to the ice for an abbreviated 1945–46 season. In 1950 Ralph "Cooney" Weiland became head coach, Weiland was a former NHL scoring champion who won Stanley Cups as both a player and a coach with the Boston Bruins. With the hire, Weiland became the first non-alumnus to become head coach of the program.

Weiland guided Harvard to win the inaugural Beanpot hockey tournament on December 27, 1952, when the team defeated Boston University 7–4. A few seasons later Weiland's Crimson team competed in the 1955 NCAA Ice Hockey Tournament. It was the first Frozen Four appearance by the university. The 1954–55 season was highlighted by William J. "Billy" Cleary leading the nation in scoring with 89 points in 21 games, his point total still stands as the Harvard single-season record. Cleary and classmate Chuck Flynn become Harvard's first All-Americans. The team returned to the tournament in 1957 and 1958. All three tournament appearances under Weiland saw the Crimson exit in the semi-final round.

In 1956 Harvard moved into the 2,000-seat Donald C. Watson Rink bringing hockey back on campus from the Boston Arena. The rink was located north of Harvard Stadium.

Harvard became a founding member of the ECAC Hockey League in 1961. That same season, on January 4, 1962, Harvard defeated Northeastern 6–1 for the program's 500th win. In its second season in the ECAC, Harvard won both the league regular season championship and, with a 4–3 overtime win over Boston University, won the league championship.

At the conclusion of the 1970–71 season Weiland left the program after 21 years. He compiled a record of 316–172–17, six Ivy League championships, two ECAC championships, and five NCAA appearances. Weiland was named coach of the year by the American Hockey Coaches Association in 1955 and 1971. In 1971 he was inducted into the Hockey Hall of Fame and received the Lester Patrick Award for contribution to hockey in the United States in 1972.

=== 1971–1990 ===
Bill Cleary, former Crimson All-American, took over coaching duties for the 1971–72 season after serving as an assistant coach under Weiland. On March 7, 1975 – Harvard defeated Cornell 6–4 to win the 23rd game of the season, the first 20-win season in program history. Unfortunately, the Crimson would lose in the finals the next day to Boston University and finish fourth in the NCAA Tournament with defeats to Minnesota and the same BU squad. The team was captained by All-American Randy Roth '75, who the previous year was named the Crimson's first ever ECAC Player of the Year.

By the mid-1970s the Donald C. Watson Rink was becoming outdated and the university made plans to construct a new hockey facility. A decision was eventually made to extensively upgrade the facility and in 1978 the walls were removed and the roof was extended before the new arena was installed at a cost exceeding $5-million. During the renovation, Harvard played at B.U.'s Walter Brown Arena. Following the renovation the facility was named after former Harvard hockey player Alec Bright '19. The Bright Hockey Center increased seating by more than 800 people The ice surface was extended by five feet to 204 feet by 87 feet under the direction of coach Cleary.

Cleary lead the Crimson to their third conference tournament championship by beating Providence 4–1 in the ECAC Championship, sending the Crimson to the 1983 NCAA Tournament. Harvard first defeated Michigan State in the two-game quarter-final series by a combined score 9–8. The Crimson advanced to the Frozen Four in Grand Forks, North Dakota and defeated Minnesota 5–3 to send Harvard to the program's first NCAA Championship appearance. The Crimson was defeated in the NCAA final 2–6 by Wisconsin. Despite the loss in the final, Mark Fusco became the school's first Hobey Baker Award winner. Three seasons later, his brother, Scott Fusco became the second player and first ever pair of brothers to win the Award.

It was during this era, the 1984-85 and 1985-86 seasons specifically, that future Canadian Prime Minister Mark Carney was on the roster as a goalie and maintained a perfect save percentage in his lone appearance.

Despite a 2–3 overtime loss to Vermont in the ECAC semifinals, the 1988–89 team received an at-large bid to the 1989 NCAA Tournament, the team's fifth straight NCAA Tournament appearance. Harvard swept Lake Superior State in the two game quarter-final round by a combined score of 9–4. The team advanced to the Frozen Four in St. Paul, Minnesota and defeated Michigan State 6–3 before facing the hometown Minnesota Golden Gophers in the championship. Harvard won their first NCAA Championship on April 1, 1989, when senior forward Ed Krayer score in overtime to give the Crimson a 4–3 overtime victory. Following the game, Lane MacDonald became the third player in program history to earn the Hobey Baker Award.

=== Recent history ===
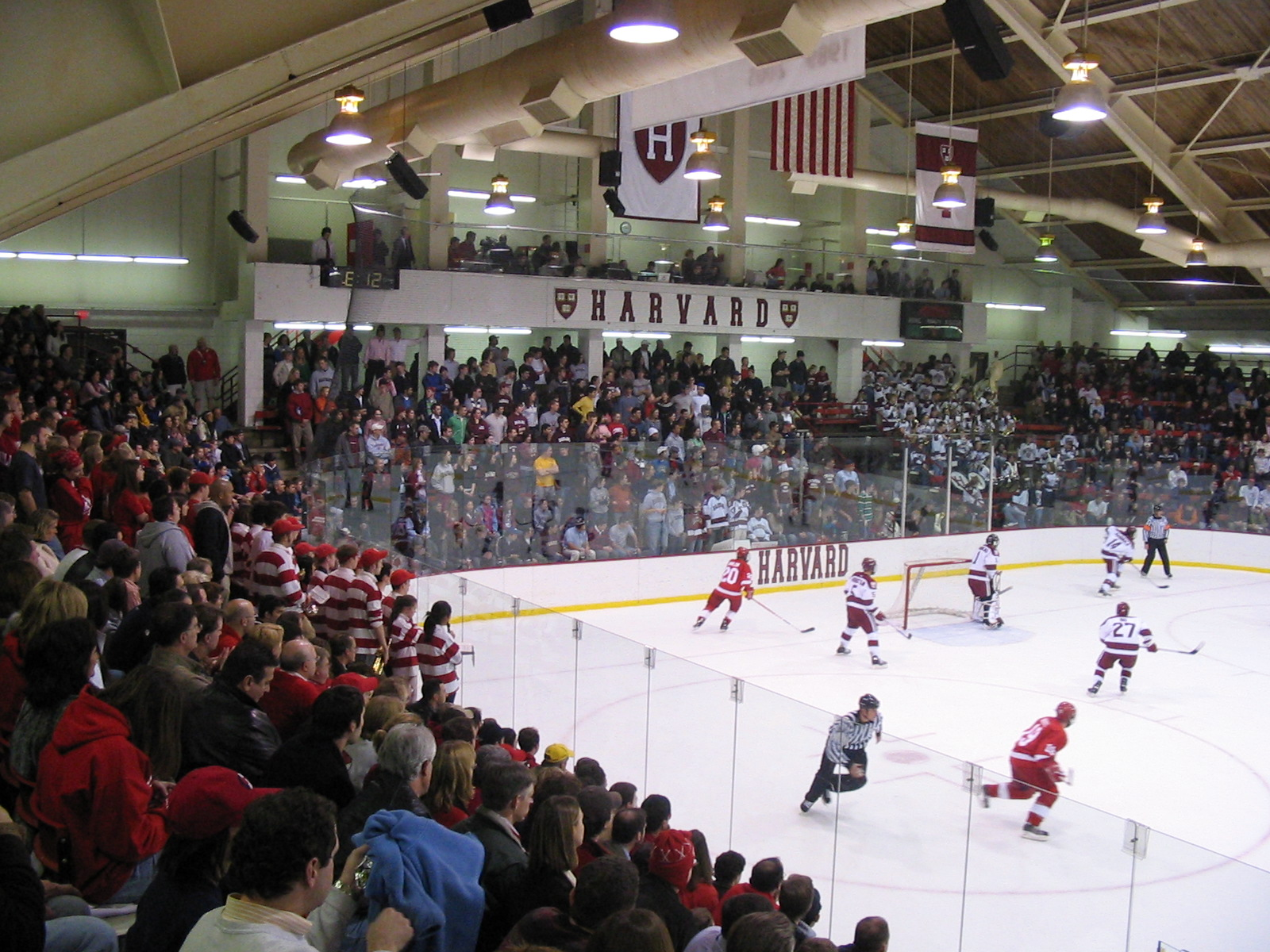
Cornell at Harvard, 2005

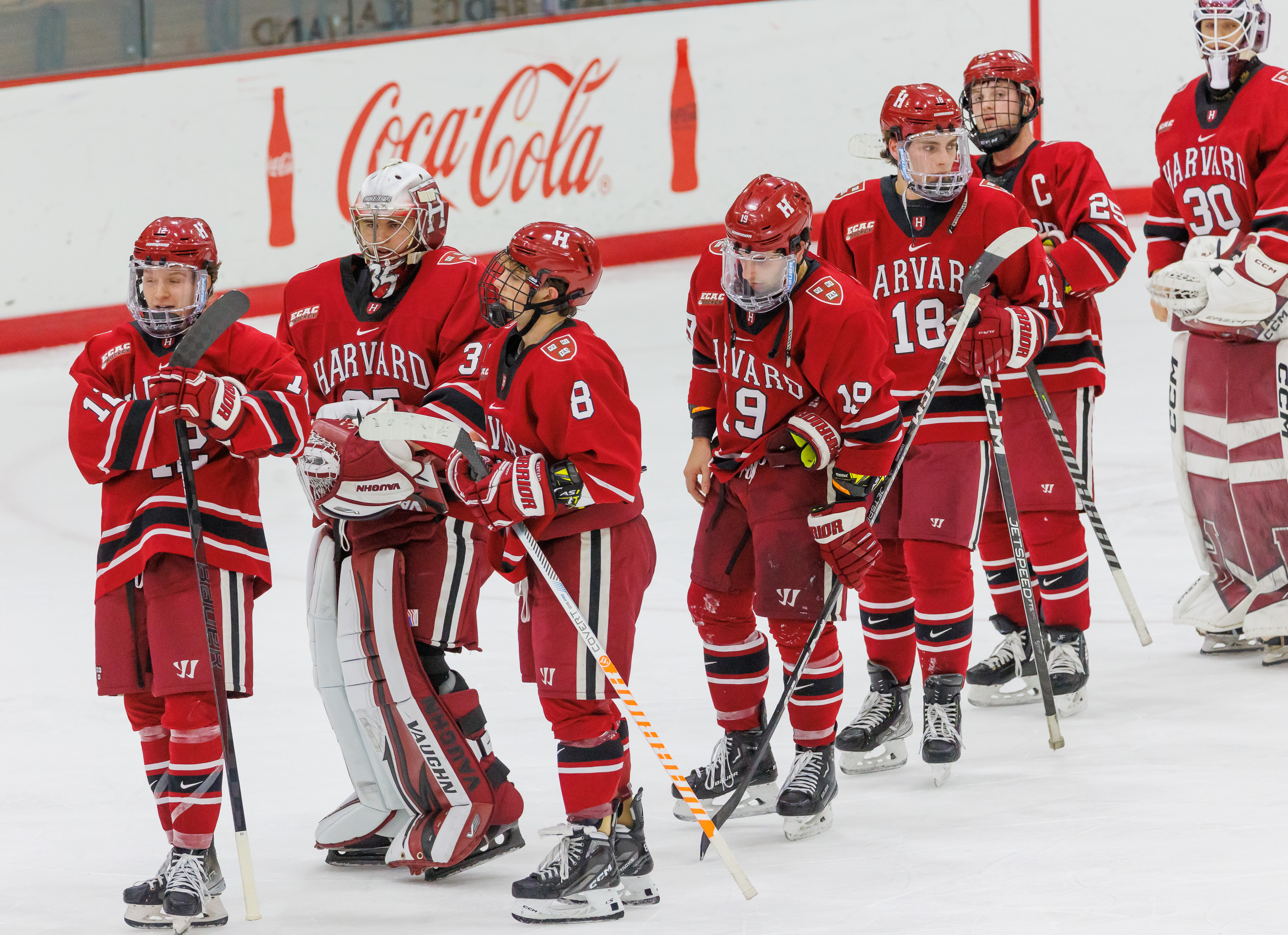
Harvard players in 2023

Bill Cleary ended his tenure as head coach at the conclusion of the 1989–90 season to become the director of athletics. In his 19 seasons as head coach for the program he won 324 games and took the Crimson to the NCAA Tournament nine times, the Frozen Four on seven occasions, and the first national championship for Harvard. The ECAC regular season championship, the Cleary Cup, is named in honor of the former Harvard player, coach, and Olympian for his efforts to form the conference. Longtime assistant Ronn Tomassoni was named head coach for the following season. In his first season as head coach on February 1, 1992, Tomassoni guided Harvard to the program's 1,000 win when it defeats Union, 7–3.

In 1993 the team returned to the NCAA Tournament for the first time since their championship in 1989. The Crimson lost in double overtime to Northern Michigan 2–3. Harvard returned to the NCAA the following season in 1994 and advanced to the Frozen Four with a 7–1 win over New Hampshire. In the NCAA semifinal the Crimson fell to Lake Superior State 3–2 in overtime. finishing the year a record of 24–5–4. The appearance in the 1994 Frozen Four was the last of the program to date.

Mark Mazzoleni became the tenth coach in program history on July 16, 1999. Under Mazzoleni the Crimson reached the NCAA Tournament three straight seasons in 2001–02, 2002–03, and 2003–04. The streak was extended to five straight seasons, tying a program high, by Ted Donato in 2004–05 and 2005–06.

Adam Fox played for the team as a freshman for the 2016–17 season, led all NCAA defensemen with 40 points, and led all NCAA defensemen and all NCAA freshmen skaters in assists with 34, as he played 35 games. He was named 2017 ECAC Rookie of the Year and Ivy League Rookie of the Year. In his junior 2018–19 season, he was the top scoring player and defenseman in the country with 1.45 points per game. He led the NCAA in assists, while also setting school single-season records for assists by a defenseman. Fox also broke the school record for points by a Harvard defenseman in one season, set by Mark Fusco in 1983.

== Season-by-season results ==
Source:

== Championships ==
=== Pre-NCAA ===
- Before the NCAA began holding a national tournament in 1948, Harvard won 17 intercollegiate titles: 1903, 1904, 1905, 1906, 1909, 1913, 1916, 1920, 1921, 1922, 1926, 1927, 1930, 1932, 1933, 1936, 1937

=== NCAA ===
- 1-time NCAA men's champions: 1989

=== Ivy League champions ===
- 24-time Ivy League men's champions: 1956, 1957, 1958, 1961, 1962, 1963, 1974, 1975, 1982, 1983*, 1984*, 1985*, 1986, 1987, 1988, 1989, 1990, 1993, 1994, 2000, 2006, 2016*, 2017, 2022

(*denotes tie)

=== ECAC Hockey ===
- 11-time ECAC men's champions: 1963, 1971, 1983, 1987, 1994, 2002, 2004, 2006, 2015, 2017, 2022
- 11-time ECAC men's regular-season champions: 1963, 1973*, 1975, 1986, 1987, 1988*, 1989, 1992, 1993, 1994, 2017*

(*denotes tie)

=== Season tournaments ===
- 11-time Beanpot champion: 1953, 1955, 1960, 1962, 1969, 1974, 1977, 1981, 1989, 1993, 2017
- 2-time Boston Arena Christmas Tournament champion: 1956, 1962
- 1-time Boston Garden Christmas Hockey Festival champion: 1963
- 1-time ECAC Christmas Hockey Tournament champion: 1969
- 1-time ECAC Holiday Hockey Festival champion: 1970
- 1-time Great Lakes Invitational champion: 1972
- 1-time Shillelagh Tournament champion: 2015
- 1-time Mariucci Classic champion: 2016(Jan)

== Coaches ==
Harvard's men's team has been in continual operation since 1897 with two notable exceptions. The university did not field a team for the 1917–18 season nor was there a team from 1943 through the spring of 1945. These three seasons were lost as a result of the two world wars that occurred during the first half of the 20th century. For two periods early in the team's history the team was coached by their captains; those years have been included here for continuity.

As of completion of 2024–25 season

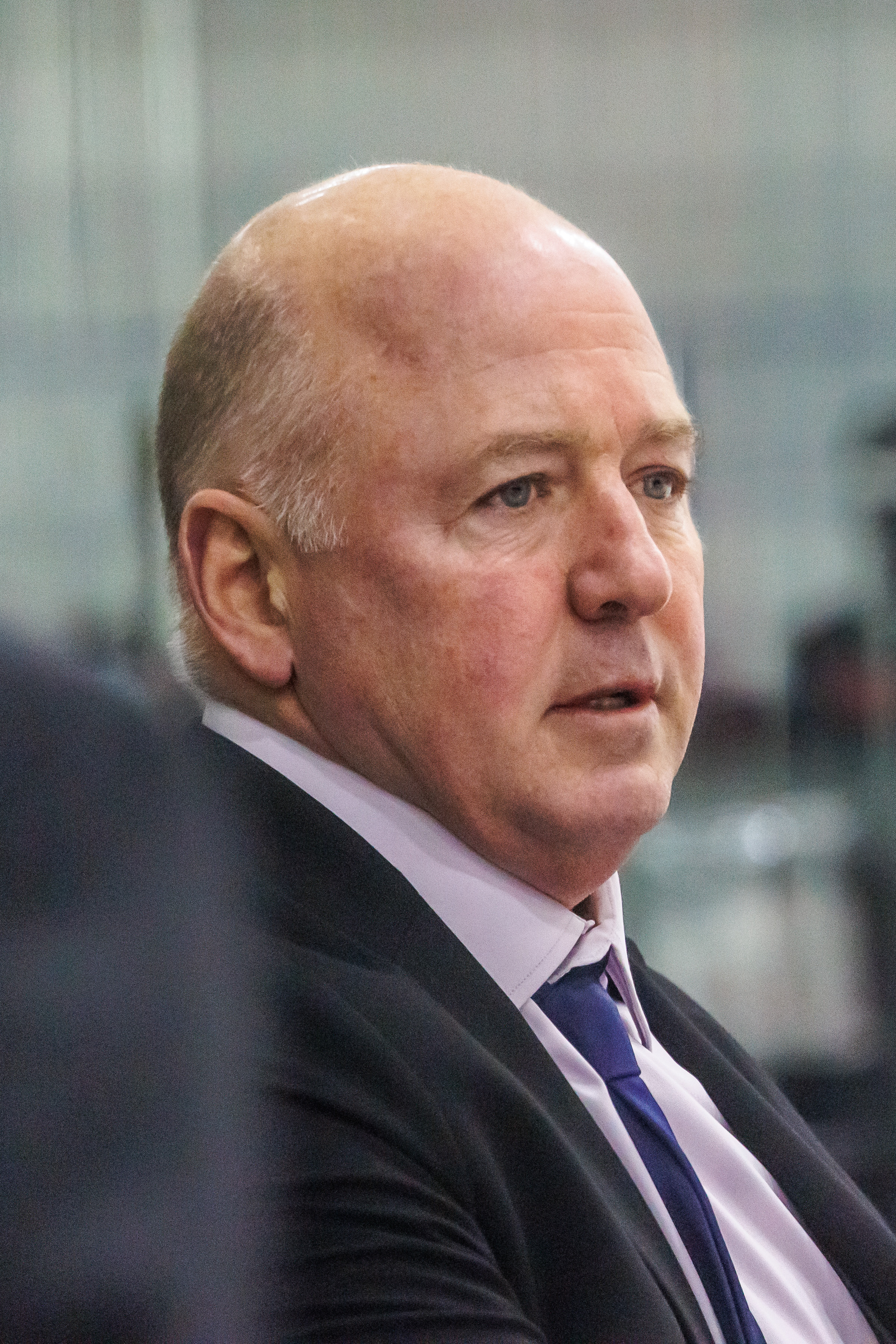
Ted Donato, winningest head coach in program history

#	Tenure	Coach	Years	Record	Pct.
–	1897–1903	(none) (Note: Coached by team captain.)	6	26–6–1	.803
1st	1903–1917, 1923–1924	Alfred Winsor	15	114–38–2	.747
–	1918–1919	(none)	1	7–0–0	1.000
2nd	1919–1923	William Claflin	4	34–10–2	.761
3rd	1924–1927	Edward Bigelow	3	25–8–2	.743
4th	1927–1938	Joseph Stubbs	11	95–43–6	.681
5th	1938–1942	Clark Hodder	4	20–34–3	.377
6th	1942–1943, 1945–1950	John Chase	6	53–44–3	.545
7th	1950–1971	Cooney Weiland	21	315–173–17	.641
8th	1971–1990	Bill Cleary	19	324–201–24	.612
9th	1990–1999	Ronn Tomassoni	9	145–115–24	.553
10th	1999–2004	Mark Mazzoleni	5	82–72–13	.530
11th	2004–2026	Ted Donato	22	334–292–77	.530
12th	2026–present	Rob Rassey	1	0–0–0	–
Totals		12 coaches	125 seasons	1,574–1,036–174	.597

== Awards and honors ==
=== Hockey Hall of Fame ===
- Cooney Weiland (1971)

=== United States Hockey Hall of Fame ===
- Joe Cavanagh (1994)
- John Chase (1973)
- Bill Cleary (1976)
- Bob Cleary (1981)
- Mark Fusco (2002)
- Scott Fusco (2002)
- John Garrison (1973)
- Austie Harding (1974)
- Lane MacDonald (2005)
- Fred Moseley (1975)
- George Owen (1973)
- Robert Ridder (1976)
- Ben Smith (2017)
- Alfred Winsor (1973)

=== NCAA ===
==== Individual awards ====
Hobey Baker Award

- Mark Fusco: 1983
- Scott Fusco: 1986
- Lane MacDonald: 1989
- Jimmy Vesey: 2016

Spencer Penrose Award

- Cooney Weiland: 1955, 1971
- Bill Cleary: 1983

NCAA Division I Ice Hockey Scoring Champion

- Bill Cleary, F: 1955
- Bob Cleary, C: 1957

Tournament Most Outstanding Player

- Ted Donato, LW; 1989

==== All-Americans ====
AHCA First Team All-Americans

- 1954-55: Bill Cleary, F
- 1957-58: Bob Cleary, F
- 1961-62: David Johnston, D
- 1962-63: David Johnston, D
- 1968-69: Joe Cavanagh, F
- 1969-70: Joe Cavanagh, F
- 1970-71: Joe Cavanagh, F
- 1971-72: Dave Hynes, F
- 1972-73: Bob McManama, F
- 1973-74: Randy Roth, F
- 1974-75: Brian Petrovek, G; Randy Roth, F
- 1980-81: Mark Fusco, D
- 1981-82: Mark Fusco, D
- 1982-83: Mark Fusco, D
- 1984-85: Scott Fusco, F
- 1985-86: Scott Fusco, F
- 1986-87: Mark Benning, D; Lane MacDonald, F
- 1988-89: Lane MacDonald, F
- 1992-93: Ted Drury, F
- 1993-94: Sean McCann, D; Steve Martins, F
- 2002-03: Dominic Moore, F
- 2004-05: Noah Welch, F
- 2011-12: Danny Biega, D; Alex Killorn, F
- 2014-15: Jimmy Vesey, F
- 2015-16: Jimmy Vesey, F
- 2016-17: Adam Fox, D
- 2017-18: Adam Fox, D; Ryan Donato, F
- 2018-19: Adam Fox, D
- 2019-20: Jack Rathbone, D
- 2021-22: Nick Abruzzese, F
- 2022-23: Henry Thrun, D; Sean Farrell, F

AHCA Second Team All-Americans

- 1956-57: Bob Cleary, F
- 1985-86: Grant Blair, G; Mark Benning, D
- 1986-87: Hank Lammens, D
- 1987-88: Don Sweeney, D
- 1988-89: C. J. Young, F
- 1989-90: Chris Harvey, G; C. J. Young, F
- 1990-91: Peter Ciavaglia, F
- 1993-94: Derek Maguire, D
- 2002-03: Noah Welch, D
- 2004-05: Dov Grumet-Morris, G
- 2016-17: Alexander Kerfoot, F
- 2019-20: Nick Abruzzese, F
- 2021-22: Henry Thrun, D
- 2022-23: Matthew Coronato, F

=== ECAC Hockey ===
==== Individual awards ====
ECAC Hockey Player of the Year

- Randy Roth; 1974
- Scott Fusco; 1985, 1986
- Lane MacDonald; 1989
- Peter Ciavaglia; 1991
- Ted Drury; 1993
- Steve Martins; 1994
- Jimmy Vesey; 2015, 2016
- Ryan Donato; 2018
- Sean Farrell; 2023

ECAC Hockey Rookie of the Year

- Kent Parrot; 1966
- Joe Cavanagh; 1969
- Jack Hughes; 1977
- Mark Fusco; 1980
- J. R. Prestifilippo; 1997
- Adam Fox; 2017

ECAC Hockey Best Defensive Defenseman

- Dave Johnston: 1963
- Danny Biega: 2012
- Henry Thrun: 2023

ECAC Hockey Best Defensive Forward

- Tom Cavanagh; 2005

Ken Dryden Award

- Oliver Jonas: 2001
- Kyle Richter: 2008

ECAC Hockey Student-Athlete of the Year

- Kyle Criscuolo; 2015, 2016

Tim Taylor Award

- Bill Cleary: 1988

ECAC Hockey Most Outstanding Player in Tournament

- Gene Kinasewich; 1963
- Dave Hynes; 1971
- Mitch Olson; 1983
- Lane MacDonald; 1987
- Sean McCann; 1994
- Tyler Kolarik; 2002
- Brendan Bernakevitch; 2004
- John Dagineau; 2006
- Jimmy Vesey; 2015
- Merrick Madsen; 2017
- Matthew Coronato; 2022

==== All-Conference ====
First Team All-ECAC Hockey

- 1961–62: David Johnston, D; Gene Kinasewich, F; Tim Taylor, F; Dave Grannis, F
- 1962–63: David Johnston, D; Gene Kinasewich, F; Tim Taylor, F
- 1963–64: Gene Kinasewich, F; Ike Ikauniks, F
- 1968–69: Joe Cavanagh, F
- 1970–71: Joe Cavanagh, F
- 1972–73: Bob McManama, F
- 1973–74: Randy Roth, F
- 1974–75: Brian Petrovek, G
- 1976–77: Jack Hughes, D
- 1980–81: Mark Fusco, D
- 1982–83: Mark Fusco, D; Scott Fusco, F
- 1984–85: Scott Fusco, F
- 1985–86: Scott Fusco, F
- 1986–87: Randy Taylor, D; Mark Benning, D; Lane MacDonald, F
- 1987–88: Don Sweeney, D
- 1988–89: Lane MacDonald, F
- 1989–90: C. J. Young, F; Mike Vukonich, F
- 1990–91: Peter Ciavaglia, F; Ted Donato, F
- 1992–93: Ted Drury, F
- 1993–94: Sean McCann, D; Brian Farrell, F; Steve Martins, F
- 2000–01: Oliver Jonas, G
- 2002–03: Dominic Moore, F; Tim Pettit, F
- 2004–05: Noah Welch, D
- 2007–08: Kyle Richter, G
- 2011–12: Danny Biega, D; Alex Killorn, F
- 2014–15: Jimmy Vesey, F
- 2015–16: Jimmy Vesey, F
- 2016–17: Adam Fox, D; Alexander Kerfoot, F
- 2017–18: Adam Fox, D; Ryan Donato, F
- 2018–19: Adam Fox, D
- 2021–22: Nick Abruzzese, F
- 2022–23: Sean Farrell, F; Henry Thrun, D

Second Team All-ECAC Hockey

- 1961–62: Harry Howell, D
- 1962–63: Godfrey Wood, G; Harry Howell, D; Ike Ikauniks, F; Bill Lamarche, F
- 1963–64: Mike Petterson, D
- 1967–68: Bob Carr, D
- 1968–69: Chris Gurry, D
- 1969–70: Joe Cavanagh, F
- 1971–72: Dave Hynes, F; Bob McManama, F
- 1972–73: Bill Corkery, F
- 1973–74: Levy Byrd, D; Bob Goodenow, F
- 1974–75: Jim Thomas, F; Randy Roth, F
- 1977–78: Jack Hughes, D
- 1981–82: Mark Fusco, D
- 1984–85: Grant Blair, G
- 1985–86: Randy Taylor, D; Mark Benning, F; Tim Smith, F
- 1986–87: Tim Barakett, F
- 1988–89: C. J. Young, F; Allen Bourbeau, F; Peter Ciavaglia, F
- 1989–90: Chris Harvey, G
- 1990–91: Mike Vukonich, F
- 1993–94: Derek Maguire, F
- 2000–01: Dominic Moore, F
- 2001–02: Brett Nowak, F
- 2002–03: Noah Welch, D
- 2004–05: Dov Grumet-Morris, G; Tom Cavanagh, F
- 2005–06: Dylan Reese, D
- 2006–07: Dylan Reese, D
- 2010–11: Danny Biega, D
- 2014–15: Patrick McNally, D; Kyle Criscuolo, F
- 2015–16: Kyle Criscuolo, F
- 2016–17: Ryan Donato, F
- 2021–22: Mitchell Gibson, G; Henry Thrun, D
- 2022–23: Mitchell Gibson, G; Alex Laferriere, F

Third Team All-ECAC Hockey

- 2005–06: Kevin Du, F
- 2007–08: Alex Biega, F
- 2008–09: Alex Biega, F
- 2010–11: Patrick McNally, F
- 2015–16: Alexander Kerfoot, F
- 2016–17: Mike Madsen, G
- 2017–18: Reilly Walsh, D
- 2021–22: Alex Laferriere, F
- 2023–24: Joe Miller, F

ECAC Hockey All-Rookie Team

- 1987–88: Peter Ciavaglia, F
- 1988–89: Chuckie Hughes, G; Allain Roy, G; Kevin Sneddon, D
- 1989–90: Ted Drury, F
- 1990–91: Derek Maguire, D; Sean McCann, D
- 1991–92: Ben Coughlin, D; Brad Konik, F; Steve Martins, F
- 1992–93: Aaron Israel, G; Tripp Tracy, G
- 1993–94: Ashlin Halfnight, D
- 1995–96: Ben Storey, D; Craig Adams, F; Craig MacDonald, F
- 1996–97: J. R. Prestifilippo, G
- 1997–98: Steve Moore, D; Chris Bala, F
- 1999–00: Dominic Moore, F
- 2000–01: Tim Pettit, F
- 2001–02: Noah Welch, D
- 2006–07: Alex Biega, D
- 2009–10: Louis Leblanc, F
- 2011–12: Steve Michalek, G; Patrick McNally, D
- 2012–13: Jimmy Vesey, F
- 2016–17: Adam Fox, D
- 2017–18: Reilly Walsh, D; Jack Baldini, F
- 2018–19: Jack Rathbone, D; Casey Dornbach, F; Jack Drury, F
- 2021–22: Ian Moore, D; Alex Laferriere, F; Matthew Coronato, F
- 2022–23: Ryan Healey, D; Joe Miller, F

== Olympians ==
This is a list of Harvard alumni were a part of an Olympic team.

Name	Position	Harvard Tenure	Team	Year	Finish
Willard Rice	Left Wing	N/A	(United States) USA	1924	Silver
John Chase	Forward	1925–1928	(United States) USA	1932	Silver
John Garrison	Defenceman	1928–1931	(United States) USA	1932, 1936, 1948 (coach)	Silver, Bronze, DQ†
Alfred Winsor	Forward	1900–1902	(United States) USA	1932 (coach)	Silver
Frank Stubbs	Forward	1929–1930	(United States) USA	1936	Bronze
Goodwin Harding	Goaltender	1942–1943	(United States) USA	1948	DQ†
Lewis Preston	Center	1946–1947, 1948–1951	(United States) USA	1948	DQ†
Robert Ridder	N/A	N/A	(United States) USA	1952 (manager), 1956 (manager)	Silver, Silver
Bill Cleary	Forward	1953–1955	(United States) USA	1956, 1960	Silver, Gold
Bob Cleary	Center	1955–1958	(United States) USA	1960	Gold
Robert McVey	Defenseman	1955–1958	(United States) USA	1960	Gold
Edwyn Owen	Defenseman	1955–1958	(United States) USA	1960	Gold
Dan Bolduc	Left Wing	1972–1975	(United States) USA	1976	5th
Theodore Thorndike	Right Wing	1972–1975	(United States) USA	1976	5th
Mark Fusco	Defenseman	1979–1983	(United States) USA	1984	7th
Scott Fusco	Center	1981–1983, 1984–1986	(United States) USA	1984, 1988	7th, 7th
Tim Taylor	Center	1960–1963	(United States) USA	1984 (asst. coach), 1994 (coach)	7th, 8th
Allen Bourbeau	Center	1985–1987, 1988–1989	(United States) USA	1988	7th
Lane MacDonald	Left Wing	1984–1987, 1988–1989	(United States) USA	1988	7th
Ben Smith	Forward	1965–1967, 1968–1969	(United States) USA	1988 (asst. coach), 1998 (coach), 2002 (coach), 2006 (coach), 2018 (manager)	7th, Gold, Silver, Bronze, 8th
Ted Donato	Left Wing	1987–1991	(United States) USA	1992	4th
Ted Drury	Center	1989–1991, 1992–1993	(United States) USA	1992, 1994	8th
C. J. Young	Right Wing	1986–1990	(United States) USA	1992	4th
Peter Ciavaglia	Right Wing	1987–1991	(United States) USA	1994	8th
Joe Bertagna	Right Wing	1970–1973	(United States) USA	1994 (asst. coach)	8th
Allain Roy	Goaltender	1988–1992	Canada	1994	Silver
Noah Welch	Defenseman	2001–2005	(United States) USA	2018	7th
Ryan Donato	Center	2015–2018	(United States) USA	2018	7th
Nick Abruzzese	Center	2019–Present	(United States) USA	2022	5th
Sean Farrell	Left Wing	2021–Present	(United States) USA	2022	5th

† Were members of the AHA team that was allowed to play in the Olympics but disqualified from medal contention.

== Statistical leaders ==
=== Career points leaders ===
Player	Years	GP	G	A	Pts	PIM
Scott Fusco	1981–1986	123	107	133	240	
Lane MacDonald	1984–1989	128	111	114	225	
Bob Cleary	1955–1958	81	92	107	199	
Peter Ciavaglia	1987–1991	120	66	128	194	
Joe Cavanagh	1968–1971	79	60	127	187	
C. J. Young	1986–1990	124	84	78	162	
George Hughes	1975–1979	98	66	95	161	
Allen Bourbeau	1985–1989	92	58	96	155	
Bob McManama	1970–1973	75	64	87	151	
Mike Vukonich	1987–1991	114	74	74	148	

=== Career goaltending leaders ===
GP = Games played; Min = Minutes played; W = Wins; L = Losses; T = Ties; GA = Goals against; SO = Shutouts; SV% = Save percentage; GAA = Goals against average

Minimum 40 games

Player	Years	GP	Min	W	L	T	GA	SO	SV%	GAA
Godfrey Wood	1960–1963	50							.918	1.93
Merrick Madsen	2014–2018	90	5289	56	23	8	187	10	.924	2.12
Dov Grumet-Morris	2001–2005	114	6811	63	40	9	255	11	.924	2.25
Mitchell Gibson	2019–2023	79	4656	47	25	6	180	6	.918	2.32
John Dagineau	2002–2006	43	2349	25	12	2	94	3	.914	2.40

Statistics current through the end of the 2022–23 season.

== Harvard Athletic Hall of Fame ==
The following is a list of people associated with the Harvard men's ice hockey program who were elected into the Harvard Athletic Hall of Fame (induction date in parentheses).

- Alfred Winsor (1967)
- Daniel Newhall (1967)
- Trafford Hicks (1967)
- Fred Huntington (1967)
- William Clafin (1967)
- Edward Bigelow (1968)
- Jabish Holmes (1968)
- Clark Hodder (1997)
- John Chase (1969)
- Joseph Morrill (1969)
- Rene Giddens (1969)
- John Garrison (1969)
- Paulde Give (1970)
- Fred Mosely (1970)
- George Ford (1971)
- George Roberts (1971)
- Austie Harding (1971)
- Goodwin Harding (1972)
- Richard Mechem (1973)
- Bill Cleary (1980)
- Charles Flynn (1980)
- Bob Cleary (1982)
- Edwyn Owen (1982)
- John Wylde (1983)
- Albert Everts (1988)
- David Johnston (1988)
- Gene Kinasewich (1991)
- Joe Cavanagh (1993)
- Robert McVey (1995)
- Bruce Durno (1995)
- Dave Hynes (1996)
- Bob McManama (1996)
- Walter Greeley (1997)
- Amory Hubbard (1997)
- Randy Roth (1997)
- John Paine (1998)
- Brian Petrovek (1998)
- Mark Fusco (2002)
- Scott Fusco (2002)
- Mark Benning (2004)
- Lane MacDonald (2004)
- C. J. Young (2005)
- Peter Ciavaglia (2006)
- Ted Donato (2006)
- Sean McCann (2006)
- Allen Bourbeau (2007)
- Ted Drury (2008)
- Jerry Pawloski (2010)
- Don Sweeney (2010)
- Steve Martins (2010)
- Dominic Moore (2018)

== Current roster ==
As of August 28, 2025.

No.	Nat.	Player	Class	Pos	Height	Weight	DoB	Hometown	Previous team	NHL rights
1	(United States)	Evan Zhang	Sophomore	G	6' 1" (1.85 m)	154 lb (70 kg)	2006-02-02	Sherborn, Massachusetts	Roxbury Latin School (US-Prep)	—
2	(United States)	David Hejduk	Junior	D	6' 0" (1.83 m)	194 lb (88 kg)	2004-01-03	Parker, Colorado	Wenatchee Wild (BCHL)	—
3	(United States)	Matthew Biotti	Freshman	D	6' 4" (1.93 m)	181 lb (82 kg)	2004-08-27	Cambridge, Massachusetts	Penticton Vees (BCHL)	—
5	(United States)	Sean Keohane	Sophomore	D	6' 4" (1.93 m)	183 lb (83 kg)	2004-11-04	Boston, Massachusetts	West Kelowna Warriors (BCHL)	BUF, 173rd overall 2023
6	(United States)	Richard Gallant	Freshman	F	5' 8" (1.73 m)	170 lb (77 kg)	2007-06-12	Concord, Massachusetts	USNTDP (USHL)	SJS, 210th overall 2025
7	(United States)	Philip Tresca	Senior	F	6' 0" (1.83 m)	190 lb (86 kg)	2002-04-10	Newton, Massachusetts	Muskegon Lumberjacks (USHL)	—
8	(United States)	Donato Bracco	Freshman	D	5' 10" (1.78 m)	161 lb (73 kg)	2007-07-26	Locust Valley, New York	USNTDP (USHL)	—
9	(United States)	Ryan Healey	Senior	D	6' 0" (1.83 m)	172 lb (78 kg)	2004-05-19	Hull, Massachusetts	Sioux Falls Stampede (USHL)	MIN, 121st overall 2022
10	(United States)	Ryan Fine	Junior	F	5' 9" (1.75 m)	183 lb (83 kg)	2005-03-14	Center Moriches, New York	USNTDP (USHL)	—
11	(United States)	Justin Solovey	Sophomore	F	6' 2" (1.88 m)	209 lb (95 kg)	2004-11-29	Holmdel, New Jersey	Muskegon Lumberjacks (USHL)	—
12	(United States)	Joe Miller (C)	Senior	F	5' 9" (1.75 m)	160 lb (73 kg)	2002-09-15	Minneapolis, Minnesota	Chicago Steel (USHL)	TOR, 180th overall 2020
13	(United States)	Marek Hejduk	Senior	F	6' 0" (1.83 m)	184 lb (83 kg)	2004-01-03	Parker, Colorado	USNTDP (USHL)	—
14	(Canada)	Matthew Morden	Junior	D	6' 4" (1.93 m)	203 lb (92 kg)	2004-07-29	Hamilton, Ontario	Muskegon Lumberjacks (USHL)	UTA, 131st overall 2022
16	(United States)	William McDonough	Sophomore	F	6' 2" (1.88 m)	194 lb (88 kg)	2005-06-18	Duxbury, Massachusetts	Sioux Falls Stampede (USHL)	—
17	(United States)	Will Hughes	Sophomore	F	6' 2" (1.88 m)	183 lb (83 kg)	2003-09-23	Andover, Massachusetts	Green Bay Gamblers (USHL)	—
18	(United States)	Michael Callow	Junior	F	6' 4" (1.93 m)	181 lb (82 kg)	2004-01-15	Boston, Massachusetts	Muskegon Lumberjacks (USHL)	ANA, 154th overall 2022
19	(United States)	Ben MacDonald	Junior	F	6' 0" (1.83 m)	181 lb (82 kg)	2004-02-24	Weston, Massachusetts	West Kelowna Warriors (BCHL)	SEA, 91st overall 2022
20	(United States)	Drake Murray	Freshman	D	6' 1" (1.85 m)	201 lb (91 kg)	2006-03-29	Manhattan Beach, California	Sioux City Musketeers (USHL)	—
21	(Canada)	Cam Johnson	Junior	F	5' 9" (1.75 m)	146 lb (66 kg)	2004-11-28	Vancouver, British Columbia	Chicago Steel (USHL)	—
22	(United States)	Mason Langenbrunner (C)	Senior	D	6' 3" (1.91 m)	179 lb (81 kg)	2002-09-14	Eden Prairie, Minnesota	Fargo Force (USHL)	BOS, 151st overall 2020
23	(United States)	Salvatore Guzzo	Junior	F	5' 11" (1.8 m)	168 lb (76 kg)	2005-04-17	Old Tappan, New Jersey	USNTDP (USHL)	—
24	(United States)	Chase Stefanek	Freshman	F	6' 2" (1.88 m)	192 lb (87 kg)	2006-08-01	Yorba Linda, California	Muskegon Lumberjacks (USHL)	—
26	(United States)	Lucas St. Louis	Sophomore	D	5' 11" (1.8 m)	170 lb (77 kg)	2005-03-30	Burlington, Vermont	Dubuque Fighting Saints (USHL)	—
27	(Canada)	Mick Thompson	Sophomore	F	5' 9" (1.75 m)	170 lb (77 kg)	2004-03-01	Toronto, Ontario	Chicago Steel (USHL)	—
28	(Finland)	Heikki Ruohonen	Freshman	F	6' 2" (1.88 m)	205 lb (93 kg)	2006-06-19	Helsinki, Finland	Dubuque Fighting Saints (USHL)	PHI, 107th overall 2024
29	(United States)	Casey Severo	Senior	F	5' 9" (1.75 m)	177 lb (80 kg)	2001-02-01	Penfield, New York	Madison Capitols (USHL)	—
31	(Canada)	Ben Charette	Sophomore	G	6' 2" (1.88 m)	183 lb (83 kg)	2003-09-23	Aurora, Ontario	Whitecourt Wolverines (AJHL)	—
44	(United States)	James Mackey	Freshman	D	6' 6" (1.98 m)	243 lb (110 kg)	2005-10-15	Villanova, Pennsylvania	Dubuque Fighting Saints (USHL)	—
88	(Canada)	Aidan Lane	Freshman	F	6' 1" (1.85 m)	192 lb (87 kg)	2007-02-04	Mississauga, Ontario	Brampton Steelheads (OHL)	CGY, 176th overall 2025

== Crimson in the NHL ==
As of July 1, 2025.

= NHL All-Star team	= NHL All-Star	= NHL All-Star and NHL All-Star team	= Hall of Famers

Player	Position	Team(s)	Years	Games	Stanley Cups
Nick Abruzzese	Center	TOR	2021–2023	11	0
Craig Adams	Right Wing	CAR, CHI, PIT	2000–2015	951	2
Chris Bala	Left Wing	OTT	2001–2002	6	0
Alex Biega	Defenseman	VAN, DET, TOR	2014–2022	243	0
Danny Biega	Defenseman	CAR	2014–2015	10	0
Colin Blackwell	Center	NSH, NYR, SEA, TOR, CHI, DAL	2018–Present	298	0
Dan Bolduc	Left Wing	DET, CGY	1978–1984	102	0
Greg Britz	Right Wing	TOR, HFD	1983–1987	8	0
Tom Cavanagh	Center	SJS	2007–2009	18	0
Peter Ciavaglia	Center	BUF	1991–1993	5	0
Matthew Coronato	Right Wing	CGY	2022–Present	112	0
Kyle Criscuolo	Center	BUF, DET	2017–2023	16	0
Ryan Donato	Center	BOS, MIN, SJS, SEA, CHI	2017–Present	483	0
Ted Donato	Left Wing	BOS, NYI, OTT, ANA, DAL, STL, NYR	1991–2004	796	0
Jack Drury	Center	CAR, COL	2021–Present	186	0
Ted Drury	Center	CGY, HFD, OTT, ANA, NYI, CBJ	1993–2001	414	0
John Farinacci	Center	BOS	2024–Present	1	0
Sean Farrell	Left Wing	MTL	2022–2023	6	0
Adam Fox	Defenseman	NYR	2019–Present	431	0
Mark Fusco	Defenseman	HFD	1983–1985	80	0
Jack Hughes	Defenseman	COR	1980–1982	46	0
Dave Hynes	Left Wing	BOS	1973–1975	22	0
Alexander Kerfoot	Center	COL, TOR, ARI, UTA	2017–Present	605	0

Player	Position	Team(s)	Years	Games	Stanley Cups
Alexander Killorn	Left Wing	TBL, ANA	2012–Present	950	2
Alex Laferriere	Right Wing	LAK	2023–Present	158	0
Louis Leblanc	Center	MTL	2011–2014	50	0
Craig MacDonald	Center	CAR, FLA, BOS, CGY, CHI, TBL, CBJ	1998–2009	233	0
Sean Malone	Center	BUF, NSH	2016–2021	2	0
John Marino	Defenseman	PIT, NJD, UTA	2019–Present	363	0
Steve Martins	Center	HFD, CAR, OTT, TBL, NYI, STL	1995–2006	267	0
Bob McManama	Center	PIT	1973–1976	99	0
Dominic Moore	Center	NYR, PIT, MIN, TOR, BUF, FLA, MTL, TBL, SJS, BOS	2003–2018	897	0
Ian Moore	Defenseman	ANA	2024–Present	3	0
Steve Moore	Center	COL	2001–2004	69	0
Kirk Nielsen	Rich Wing	BOS	1997–1998	6	0
George Owen	Defenseman	BOS	1928–1933	192	1
Jack Rathbone	Defenseman	VAN	2020–2023	28	0
Dylan Reese	Defenseman	NYI, PIT, ARI	2009–2015	78	0
Marshall Rifai	Defenseman	TOR	2023–2024	2	0
Neil Sheehy	Defenseman	CGY, HFD, WAS	1983–1992	379	0
Don Sweeney	Defenseman	BOS, DAL	1988–2004	1,115	0
Henry Thrun	Defenseman	SJS	2022–Present	119	0
Jimmy Vesey	Left Wing	NYR, BUF, TOR, VAN, NJD, COL	2016–Present	626	0
Reilly Walsh	Defenseman	NJD	2021–2022	1	0
Noah Welch	Defenseman	PIT, FLA, TBL, ATL	2005–2011	75	0
C. J. Young	Right Wing	CGY, BOS	1992–1993	43	0

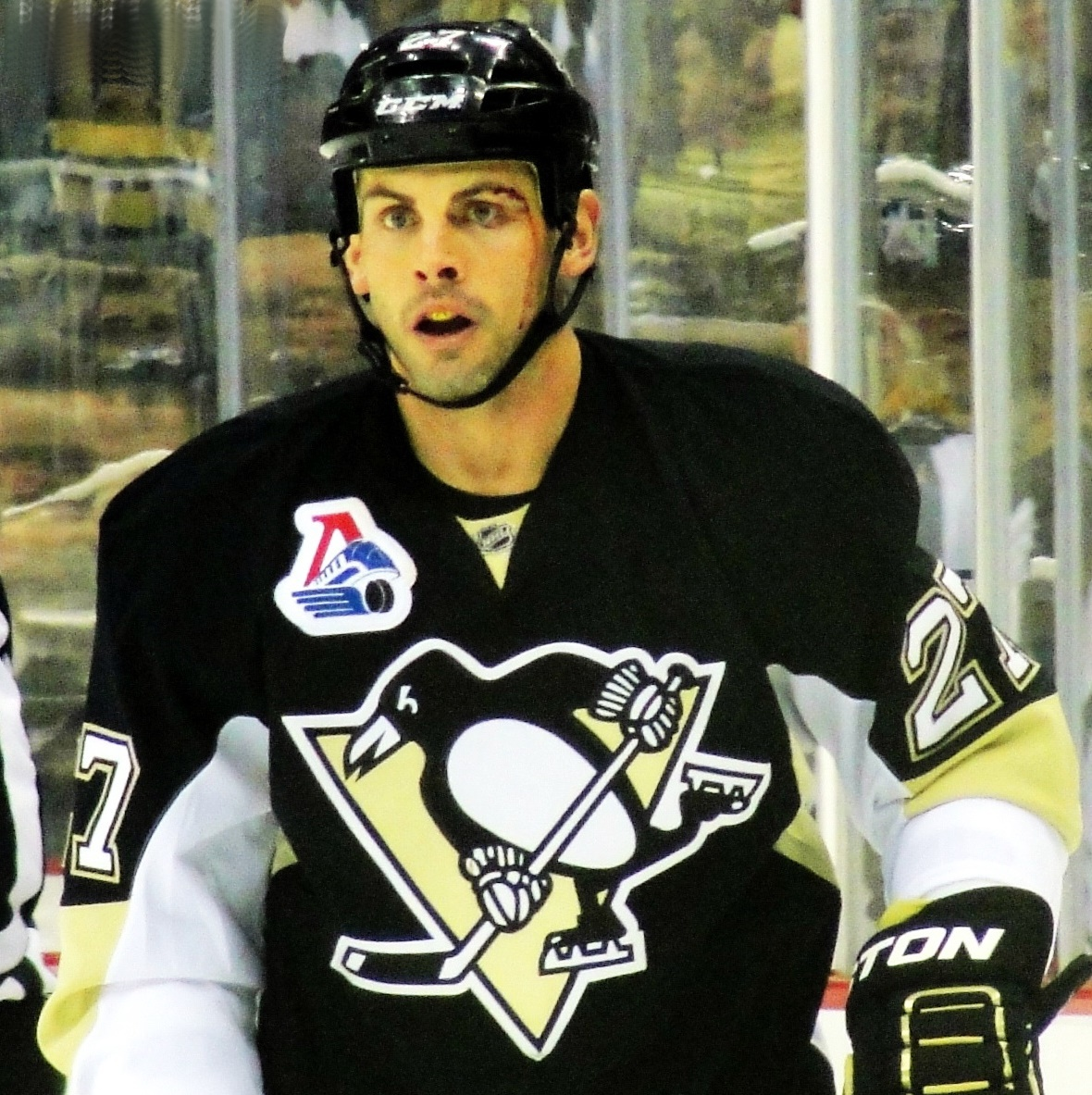
Craig Adams

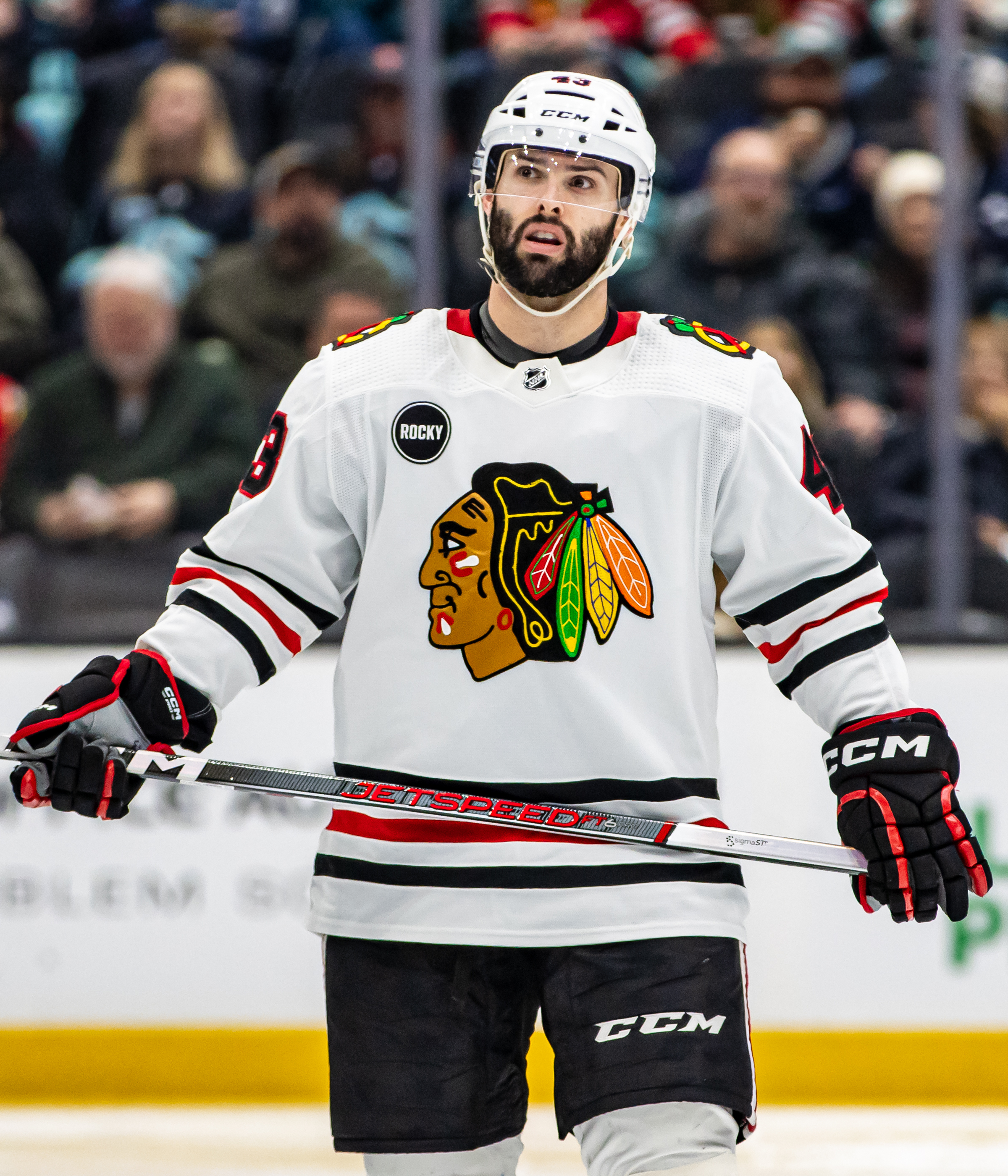
Colin Blackwell

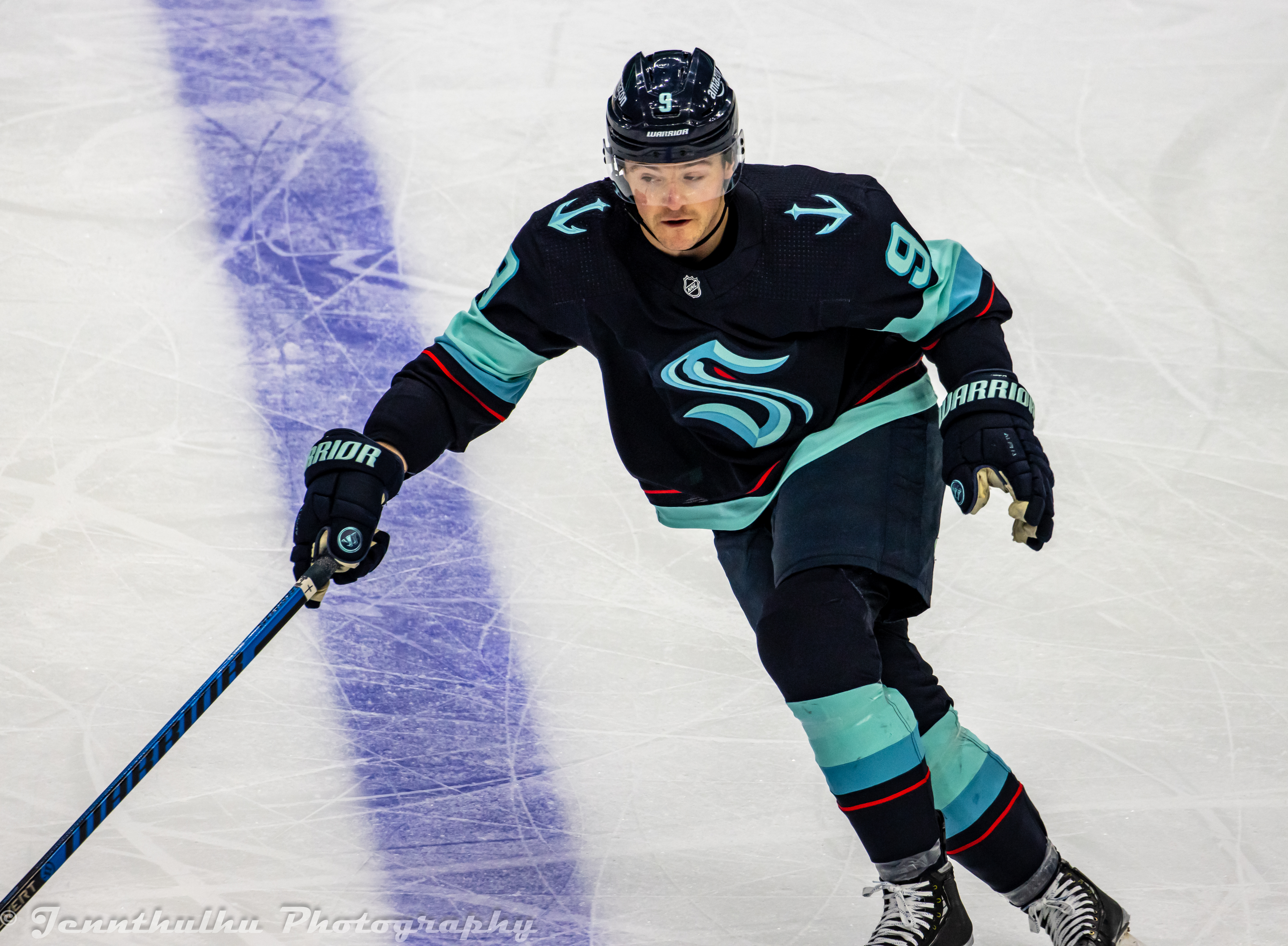
Ryan Donato

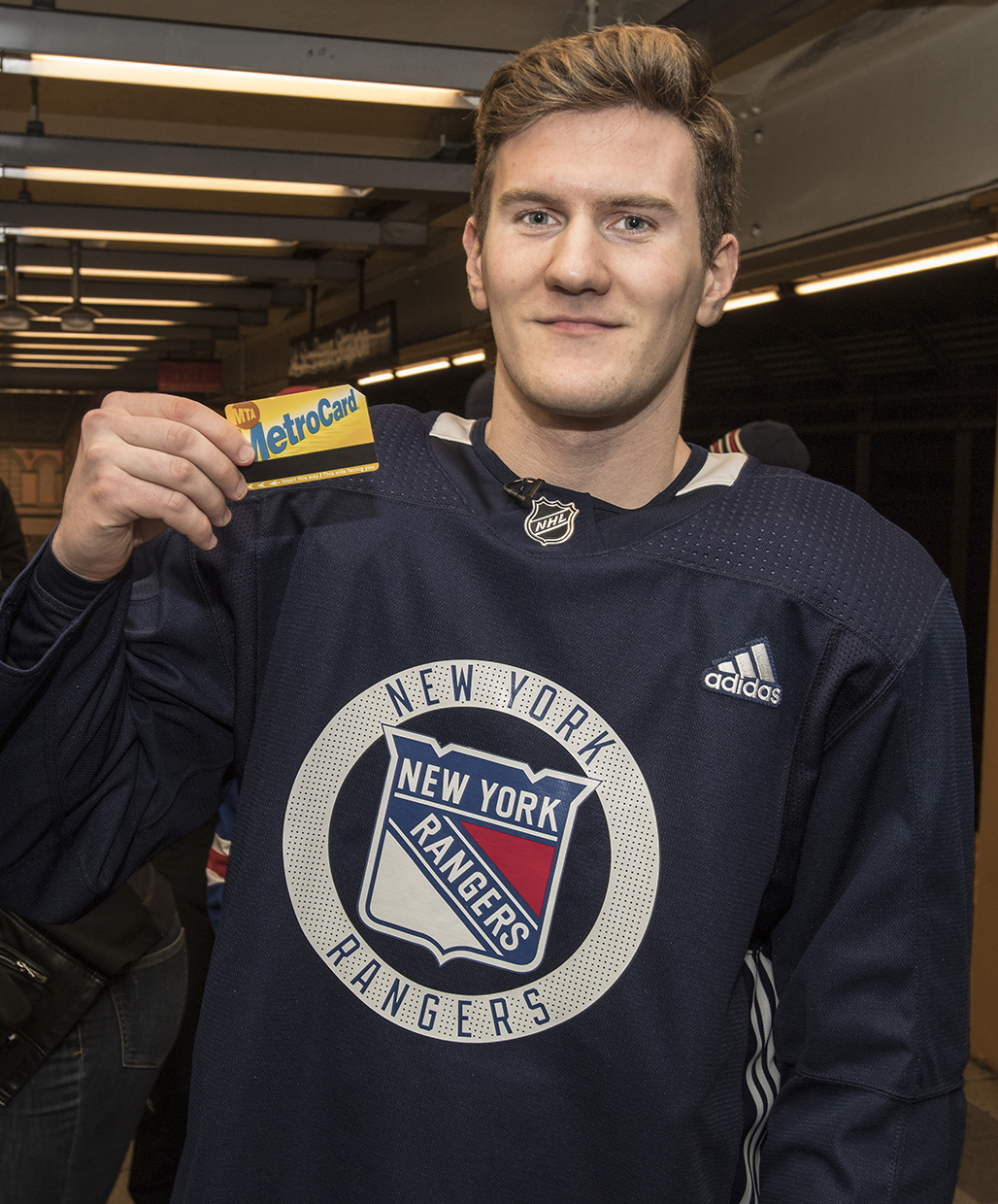
Adam Fox

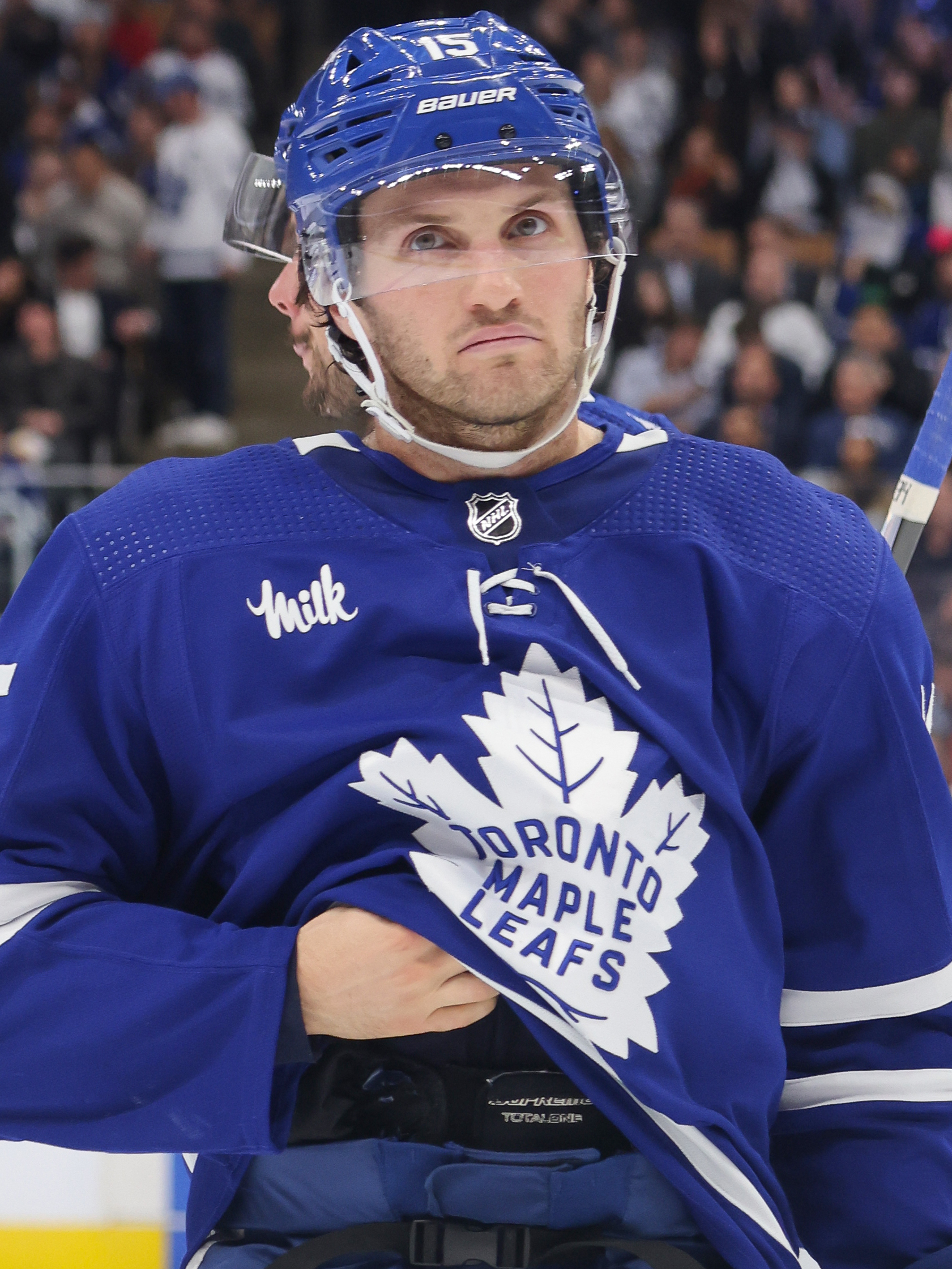
Alexander Kerfoot

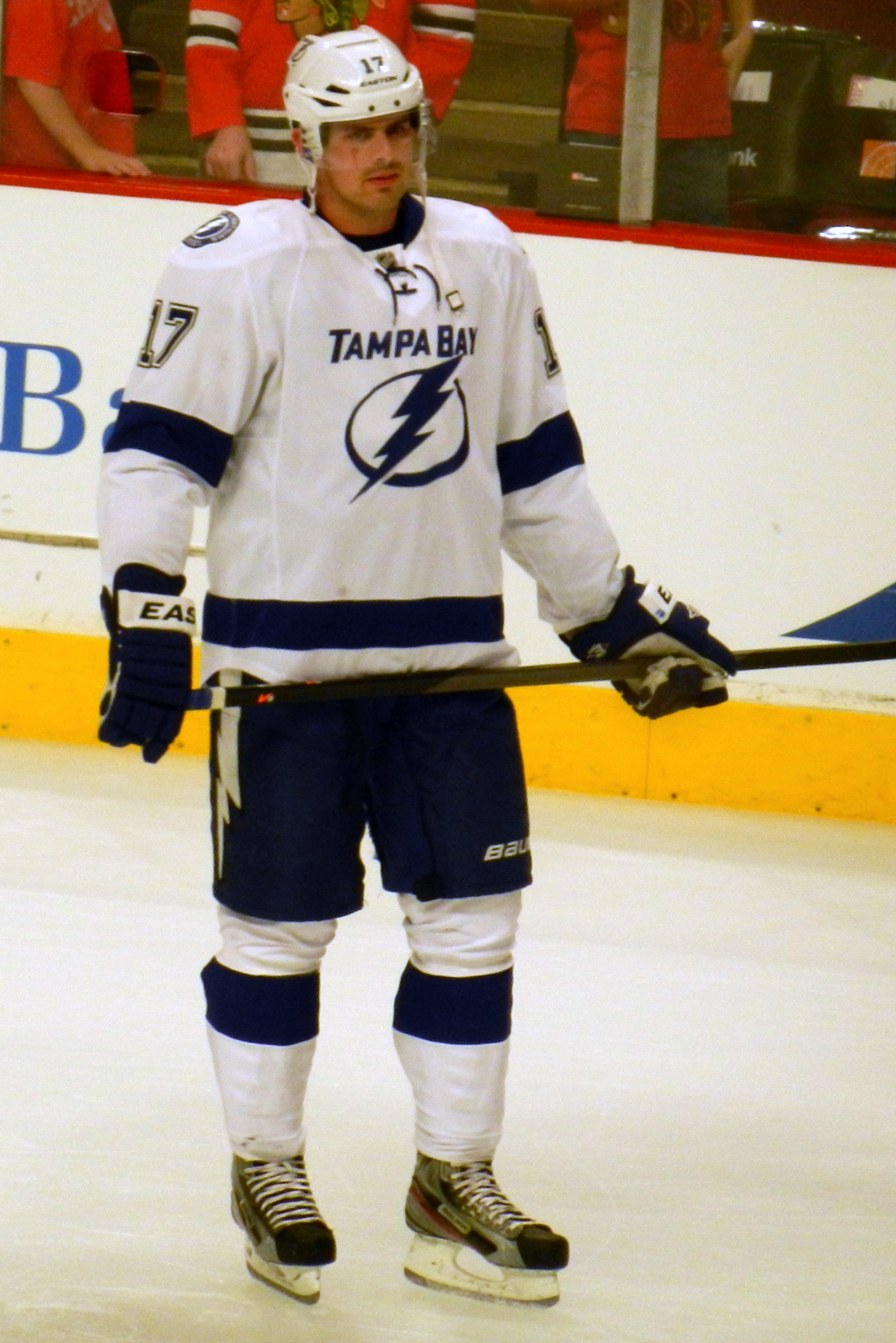
Alexander Killorn

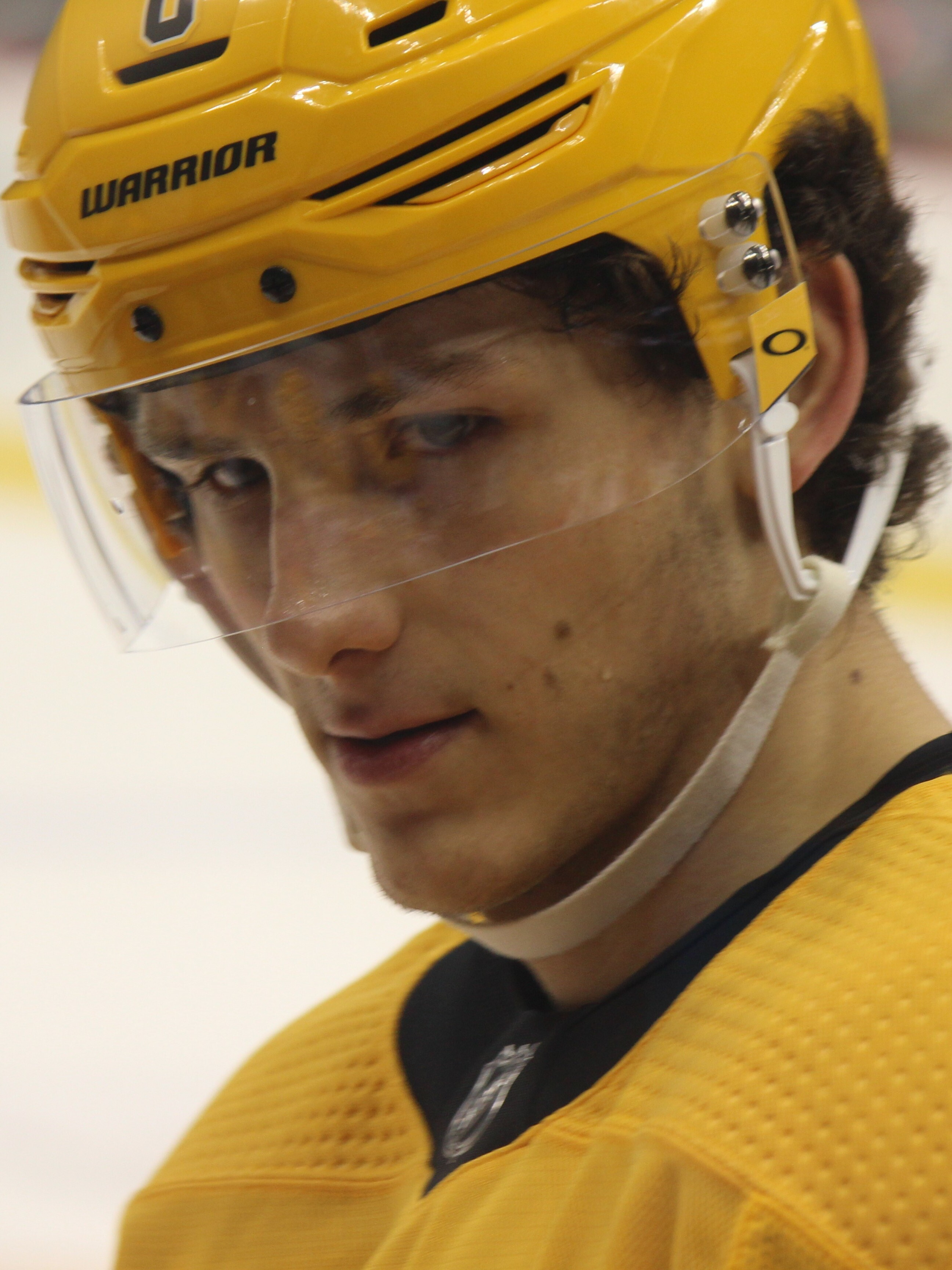
John Marino

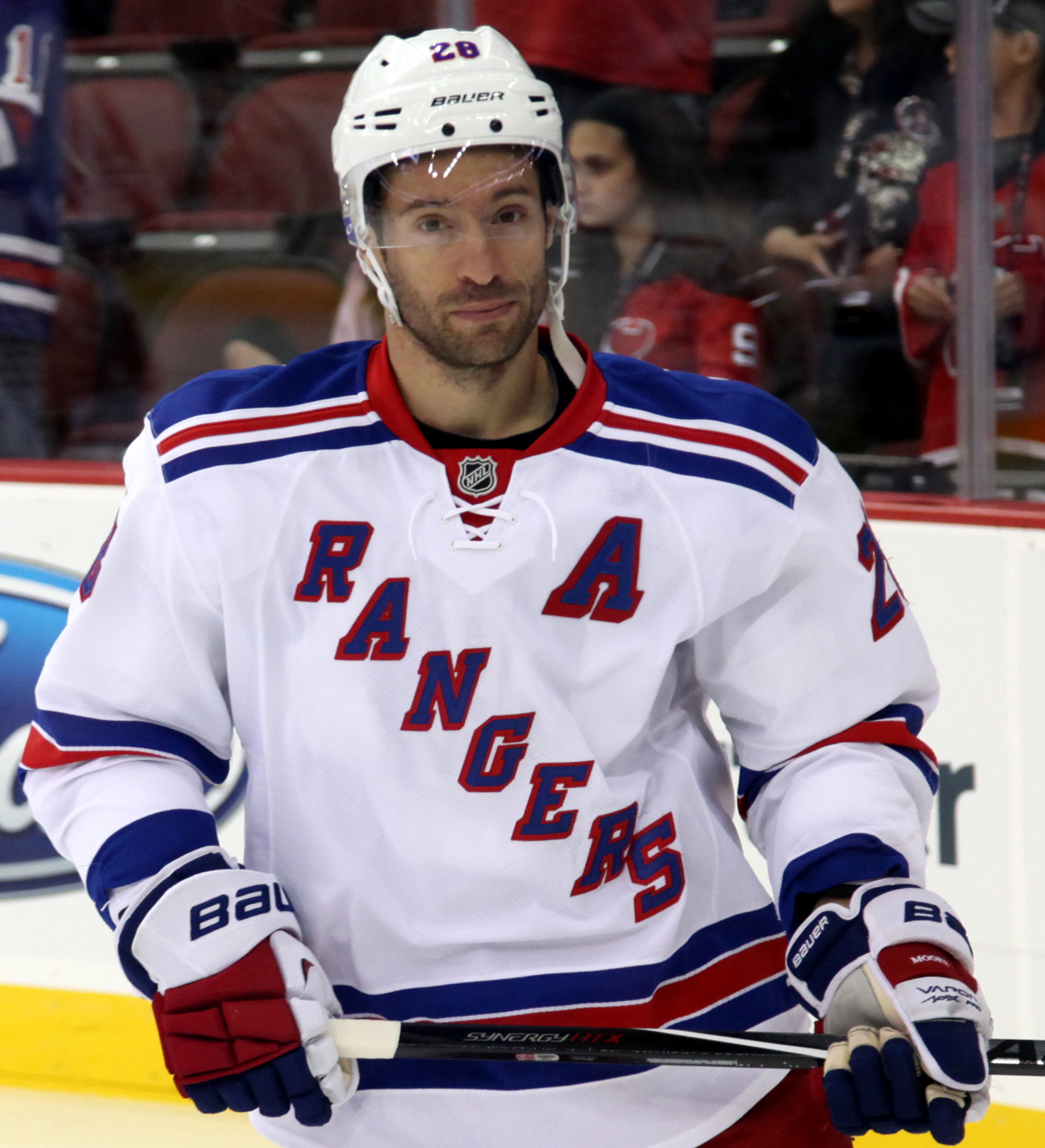
Dominic Moore

== See also ==
- Cornell–Harvard hockey rivalry
- Harvard Crimson women's ice hockey
