= Clark Hodder =

American athlete, coach, and administrator

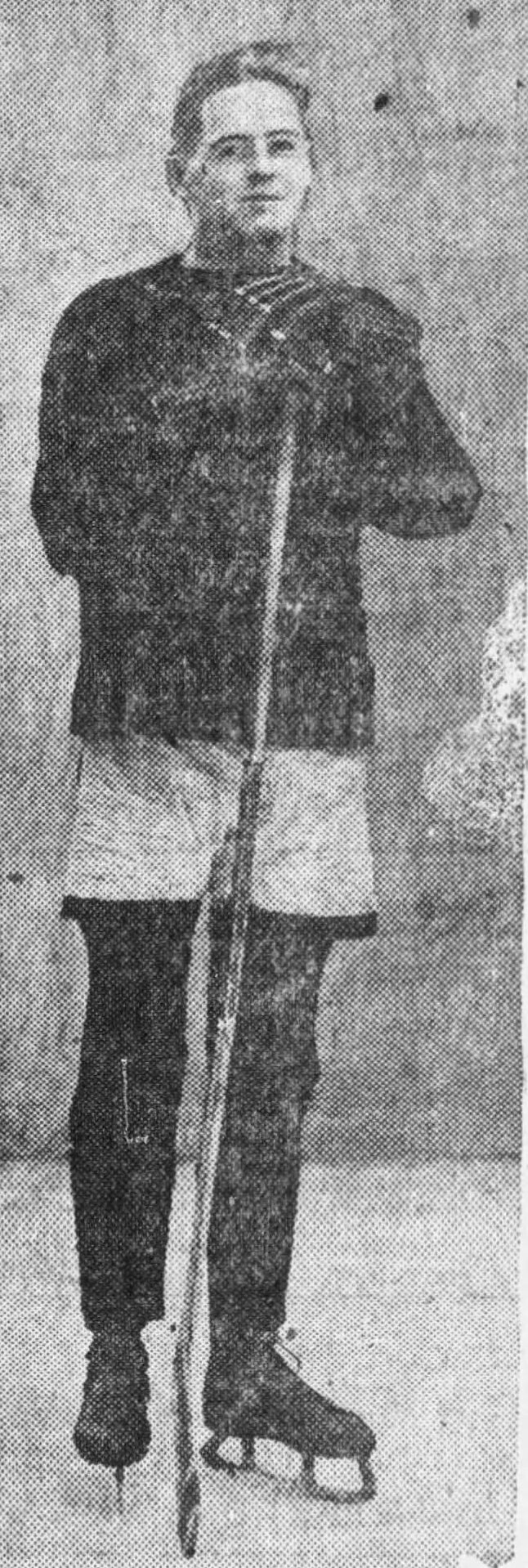
- Hodder as a Crimson ice hockey player in 1924

Biographical details
- Born: November 9, 1903; Brookline, Massachusetts, U.S.
- Died: June 15, 1968 (age 64); Framingham, Massachusetts, U.S.
- Education: Harvard College

Playing career

Golf
- 1924–1925: Harvard

Hockey
- 1921–1925: Harvard
- 1925–1926: Boston A.A.

Baseball
- 1922–1925: Harvard
- Positions: Cover point/Centre (Hockey); Left fielder (Baseball)

Coaching career (HC unless noted)

Hockey
- 1930–1938 1938–1942: Harvard (Freshmen); Harvard

Golf
- 1935–1941: Harvard

Administrative career (AD unless noted)
- 1952 1953–1958: Mass. Golf Assoc. (President); Boston Arena (Manager)

Head coaching record
- Overall: 20–34–3 (Varsity hockey)

Accomplishments and honors

Championships
- Massachusetts Junior Golf Championship (1921, 1922); Massachusetts State Amateur Championship (1936)

Clark Hodder (November 9, 1903 – June 15, 1968) was an American athlete, coach, and administrator who won the Massachusetts State Amateur Championship in golf and played and coached hockey at Harvard College.

== Golf ==
In 1921, Hodder won the Massachusetts Junior Championship. Later that year he won the South Shore Championship. In 1922, Hodder won 10 open amateur tournaments, repeated as state junior champion, and lost the Massachusetts State Amateur Championship to Francis Ouimet by one stroke.

In 1924, he won the Massachusetts mixed four-ball championship with Glenna Collett. He repeated in 1925, this time with Elizabeth Gordon. He and Lina Baker were runners-up in 1927.

The Massachusetts State Amateur Championship long eluded Hodder and in 1936, his 15th year competing in the tournament, he was described by W. A. Whitcomb of The Boston Globe as being "relegated to the category which claims Mac Smith and other stars who always challenge but never quite can win". That year he was able to win the Championship by one stroke over Leo Martin.

In 1951 and 1953, Hodder and his son, James, won the Massachusetts Golf Association's father-son championship.

== Other sports ==
Hodder was an all-around athlete at Newton High School and Harvard College. He played cover point and centre for the Harvard Crimson men's ice hockey team and was the third consecutive Newton High School graduate (after George Owen and Tad Crosby) to serve as captain of the freshman squad. As a senior, he led the Crimson to an 8-2 record. He was the only player to play the entire 90 minutes in an overtime effort against Yale, which they lost 1-0. A sports columnist wrote that Clark's "exhibition of stamina, endurance and stellar play in this contest was the greatest I have ever seen in forty years of observation." He was also the left fielder on Harvard's baseball team. In 1925, he was the captain of the Harvard golf team.

The son of a Boston Yacht Club commodore, Hodder also raced a twelve-foot yacht named Una. After graduating, Hodder continued his hockey career with the Boston Athletic Association and the University Hockey Club. He was admitted to the Harvard Varsity Club Hall of Fame for ice hockey in 1997. His granddaughter, Holly Hodder Eger (Harvard Class of 1982) accepted the award on his behalf.

== Coaching ==
In 1930, Hodder was named freshman hockey coach at Harvard. In 1935, he became the school's varsity golf coach.

In 1938 he was promoted to varsity hockey coach. In his first season as varsity coach, the Crimson, led by Austie Harding, had a successful season. The team then slumped for two seasons before making progress in 1941–42. He resigned on January 15, 1942, after several members of his team caused a disturbance during a Christmas trip to Lake Placid, New York. In his four seasons as head coach, Hodder led Harvard to a 20–34–3 record.

=== Ice hockey ===
Record table
Season	Team	Overall	Conference	Standing	Postseason
Harvard Crimson (Quadrangular League) (1938–1942)
1938–39	Harvard	7–7–1	3–2–1	2nd	
1939–40	Harvard	3–10–1	0–6–0	4th	
1940–41	Harvard	2–9–1	0–5–1	4th	
1941–42	Harvard	8–8–0	1–5–0	4th	
Harvard:		20–34–3	4–18–2		
Total:		20–34–3			
National champion Postseason invitational champion Conference regular season champion Conference regular season and conference tournament champion Division regular season champion Division regular season and conference tournament champion Conference tournament champion

== Personal life ==
On March 5, 1931, Hodder married Marjorie Estabrook of Newton, Massachusetts. They had one child together. On August 18, 1934, she was granted a divorce in Reno, Nevada. Hodder married Marian ("Peggy") Dewey Turner in 1938; they divorced in 1960. Hodder is a direct descendant of the famous writer and ship captain James Riley

== Administration ==
In 1952, Hodder was elected president of the Massachusetts Golf Association. As MGA president he had four key objectives: to have the MGA's executive committee become more active with member clubs, to establish a special public links committee, to reduce the amount of open tournaments and increase the amount of invitationals, and to start a campaign to educate golfers on the rules of the sport. He did not run for reelection in 1953 and was succeeded by George O. Russell Jr.

In 1953, Hodder was named manager of the Boston Arena. He was chosen by the arena authority's chairman, Francis Ouimet. He was responsible for creating the Boston Arena Christmas Tournament. In 1957 the Boston Hockey Coaches and Writers Association created the Clark Hodder Award to honor the New England coach of the year. The inaugural recipient was Harvard's Cooney Weiland.

Hodder also worked for his father's patent firm and for the Framingham, Massachusetts post office. He died unexpectedly on June 15, 1968, at his home in Framingham.
