= Mark Benning =

Canadian ice hockey player

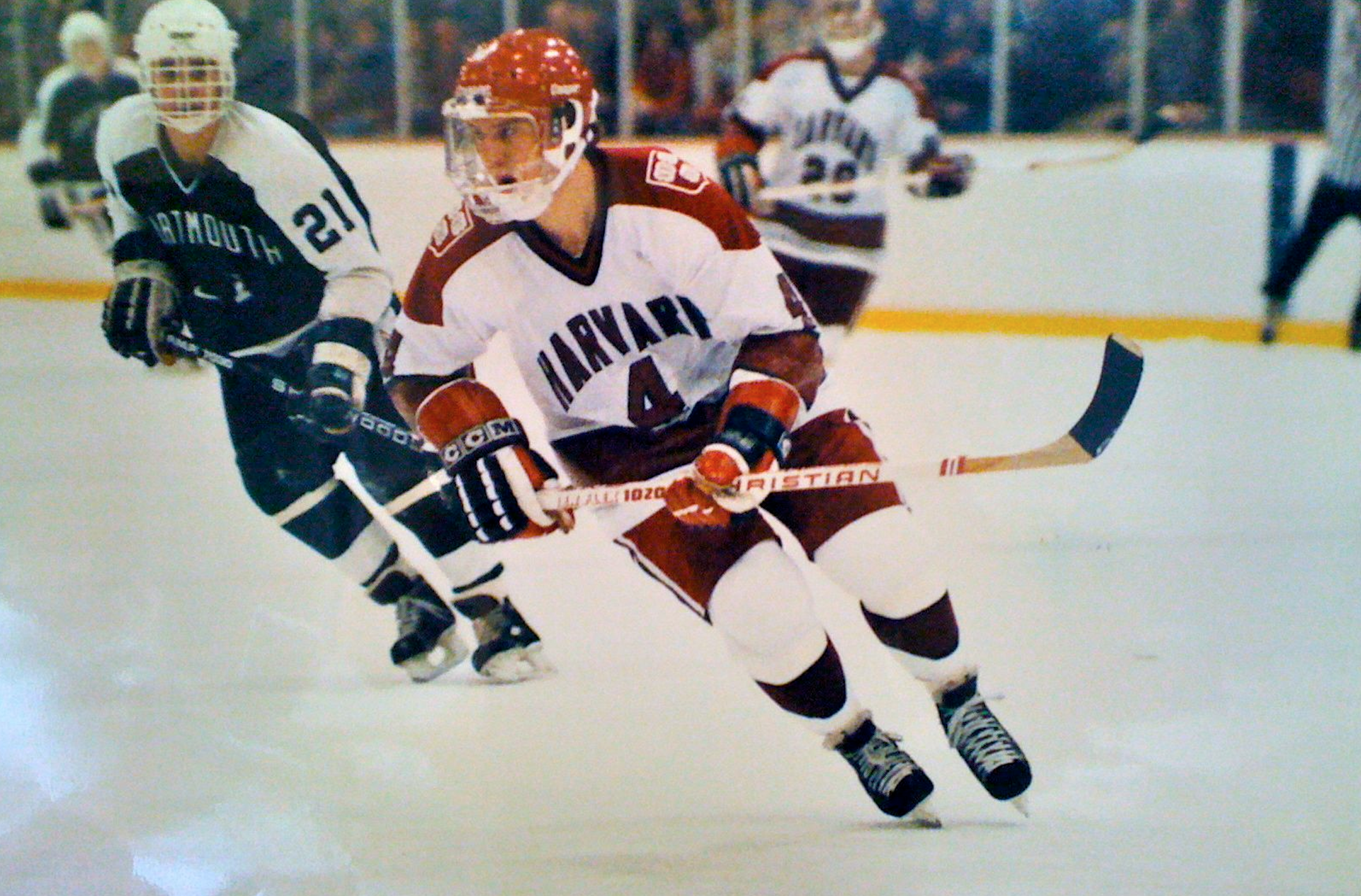
- Born: April 19, 1964 (age 62) Edmonton, Alberta, Canada
- Height: 5 ft 8 in (173 cm)
- Weight: 175 lb (79 kg; 12 st 7 lb)
- Position: Defence
- Shot: Left
- Played for: EC Bad Nauheim
- Playing career: 1987–1989

Mark Benning (born April 19, 1964) is a Canadian former professional ice hockey player and venture capitalist. He is currently serving as the founder and managing partner of Excelsior.vc. He founded and led Sprout Fund VC.

== Biography ==
Benning was born in Edmonton as the son of NHL scout Elmer Benning for the Montreal Canadiens, and brother of former NHL players Jim Benning and Brian Benning, and uncle of Brian's current NHL-playing sons, Matthew Benning and Mike Benning. While studying at Harvard University, he was roommates with Canadian prime minister Mark Carney.

=== Junior and NCAA ===
Benning played for the St. Albert Saints of the Alberta Junior Hockey League (AJHL) junior team. He was recruited by the University of Notre Dame, Benning played for two years with the Fighting Irish while studying electrical engineering and then transferred to Harvard University in 1984. Benning graduated from Harvard with a degree in economics in 1987, and excelled with the Crimson. He was named a first-team All-American, an Academic All-American, All-Ivy League, All-ECAC and as of 2014 still held the record for career assists by a defenceman at Harvard with 102. A three-year letter winner, Benning was also the 1987 Tudor Cup winner for most valuable player at Harvard and the 1987 Bingham Award winner for most valuable athlete in the Harvard senior class.

=== West Germany ===
After college, Benning played for EC Bad Nauheim in the West German Hockey League for two seasons before retiring from hockey in 1989.

=== Later career ===
After his playing career Benning went to Stanford Business School.

== Awards and honors ==
He was inducted into the Harvard Athletic Hall of Fame in 2004.

Award	Year	Ref
AHCA East Second-Team All-American	1985–86	
Academic All-America First Team	1985–86	
All-Ivy League First Team	1985–86, 1986–87	
All-ECAC Hockey Second Team	1985–86	
All-NCAA All-Tournament Team	1986	
AHCA East First-Team All-American	1986–87	
Academic All-America Second Team	1986–87	
All-ECAC Hockey First Team	1986–87	
