= Brian Benning =

Canadian ice hockey player (born 1966)

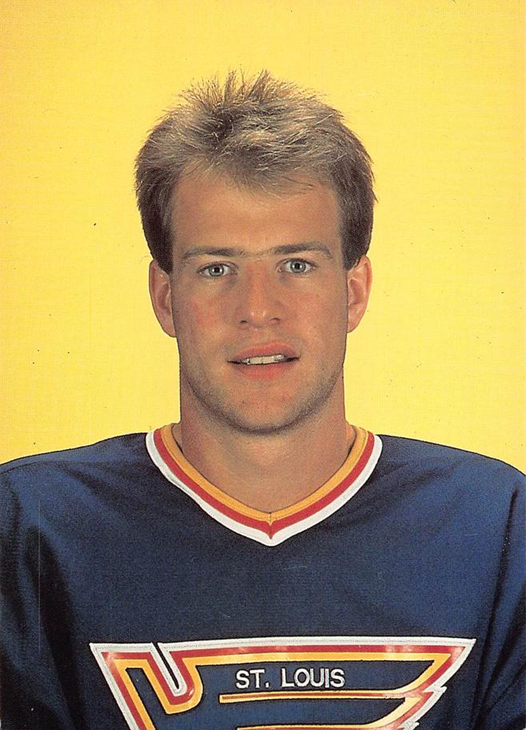
- Benning in 1988 photo
- Born: June 10, 1966 (age 60) Edmonton, Alberta, Canada
- Height: 6 ft 0 in (183 cm)
- Weight: 175 lb (79 kg; 12 st 7 lb)
- Position: Defence
- Shot: Left
- Played for: St. Louis Blues; Los Angeles Kings; Philadelphia Flyers; Edmonton Oilers; Florida Panthers
- National team: Canada
- NHL draft: 26th overall, 1984; St. Louis Blues
- Playing career: 1985–1995

Brian Anthony Benning (born June 10, 1966) is a Canadian former professional ice hockey defenceman who played ten seasons in the National Hockey League (NHL) with the St. Louis Blues, Los Angeles Kings, Philadelphia Flyers, Edmonton Oilers, and Florida Panthers. He is the younger brother of former Vancouver Canucks general manager Jim Benning, and former NCAA player Mark Benning. He is the father of both Toronto Marlies defenceman Matt Benning and Florida Panthers defenceman Mike Benning.

== Playing career ==
Benning was drafted by the St. Louis Blues in the second round, 26th overall in the 1984 NHL entry draft. He made his debut in the NHL during the 1984–85 NHL season with the Blues, playing in four games. Benning finally got the chance to have a full-time job in the NHL during the 1986–87 season. That year he played in 78 games with the Blues and scored a career-high 49 points. Benning then played two more full seasons with the Blues before being traded at the beginning of the 1989–90 season to the Los Angeles Kings. He played three seasons there before having brief stints with the Philadelphia Flyers and Edmonton Oilers.

Benning finished his career with the Florida Panthers. He was on the inaugural 1993–94 Panthers team that surprised many by nearly making the playoffs. He retired after the 1994–95 season.

== Career statistics ==
=== Regular season and playoffs ===
			Regular season					Playoffs
Season	Team	League	GP	G	A	Pts	PIM	GP	G	A	Pts	PIM
1981–82	St. Albert Saints	AJHL	3	0	2	2	14	—	—	—	—	—
1982–83	St. Albert Saints	AJHL	57	8	38	46	81	—	—	—	—	—
1983–84	Portland Winter Hawks	WHL	38	6	41	47	108	—	—	—	—	—
1984–85	Kamloops Blazers	WHL	17	3	18	21	26	—	—	—	—	—
1984–85	St. Louis Blues	NHL	4	0	2	2	0	—	—	—	—	—
1985–86	Canadian National Team	Intl	60	6	13	19	43	—	—	—	—	—
1985–86	St. Louis Blues	NHL	—	—	—	—	—	6	1	2	3	13
1986–87	Canadian National Team	Intl	20	1	4	5	22	—	—	—	—	—
1986–87	St. Louis Blues	NHL	78	13	36	49	110	6	0	4	4	9
1987–88	St. Louis Blues	NHL	77	8	29	37	107	10	1	6	7	25
1988–89	St. Louis Blues	NHL	66	8	26	34	102	7	1	1	2	11
1989–90	St. Louis Blues	NHL	7	1	1	2	2	—	—	—	—	—
1989–90	Los Angeles Kings	NHL	48	5	18	23	104	7	0	2	2	6
1990–91	Los Angeles Kings	NHL	61	7	24	31	127	12	0	5	5	6
1991–92	Los Angeles Kings	NHL	53	2	30	32	99	—	—	—	—	—
1991–92	Philadelphia Flyers	NHL	22	2	12	14	35	—	—	—	—	—
1992–93	Philadelphia Flyers	NHL	37	9	17	26	93	—	—	—	—	—
1992–93	Edmonton Oilers	NHL	18	1	7	8	59	—	—	—	—	—
1993–94	Florida Panthers	NHL	73	6	24	30	107	—	—	—	—	—
1994–95	Florida Panthers	NHL	24	1	7	8	18	—	—	—	—	—
NHL totals			568	63	233	296	963	48	3	20	23	70

=== International ===
Year	Team	Event	Result	GP	G	A	Pts	PIM
1993	Canada	WC	4th	8	1	2	3	0
Senior totals				8	1	2	3	0

== Awards and honours ==
Award	Year
NHL
All-Rookie Team	1987
