= John Chase (ice hockey) =

American ice hockey player and coach (1906–1994)

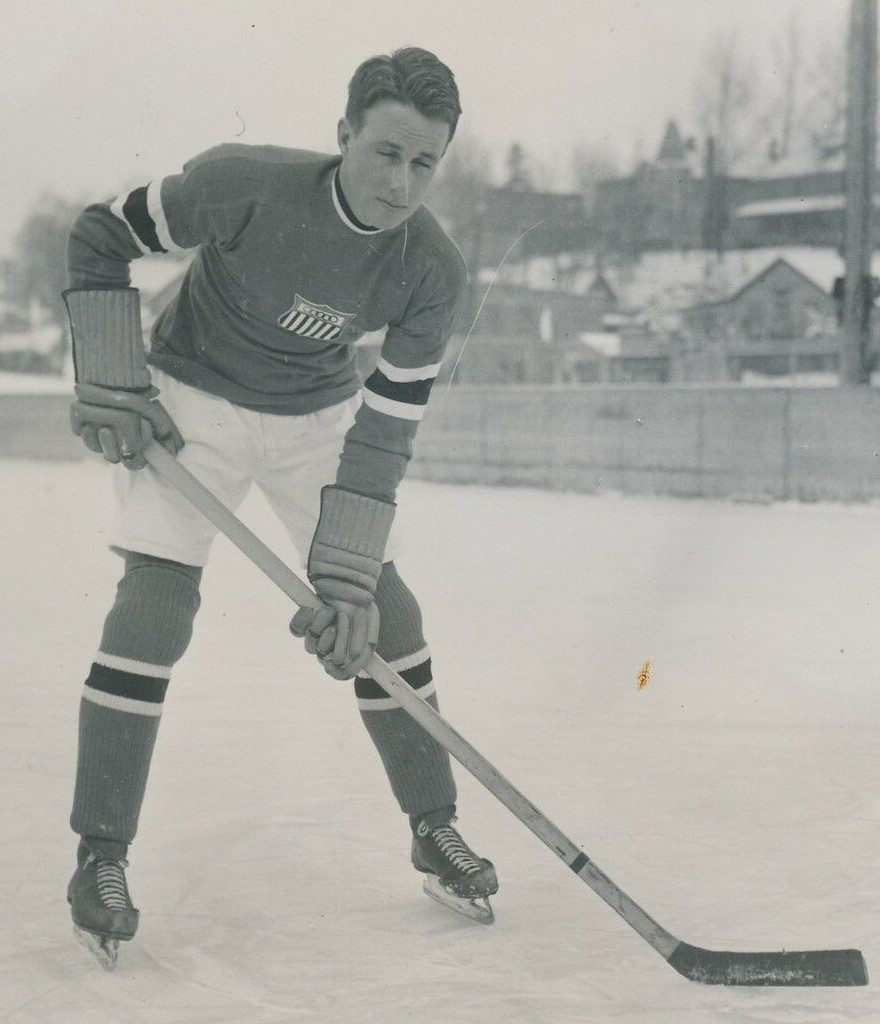

Biographical details
- Born: June 12, 1906; Milton, Massachusetts, U.S.
- Died: April 1, 1994 (aged 87); Marblehead, Massachusetts, U.S.

Playing career
- 1925–1928: Harvard
- 1932: American ice hockey team

Coaching career (HC unless noted)
- 1942–1950: Harvard

Accomplishments and honors

Awards
- 1973 United States Hockey Hall of Fame
Medal record
Men's Ice Hockey
Representing the United States
Olympic Games
Silver medal – second place	1932 Lake Placid	Team

John Pierce Chase (June 12, 1906 – April 1, 1994) was an American ice hockey player and coach who competed in the 1932 Winter Olympics.

== Early life ==
Chase grew up in Massachusetts where he excelled in ice hockey and baseball at Harvard University. He was the 1932 Harvard University Man at the Plate (baseball). He played three seasons for Harvard's baseball team (1926–1928) while simultaneously serving as the team captain for the Harvard hockey team.

== Career ==
Chase was highly sought by National Hockey League teams but chose to pursue a career in business instead. He did continue to play amateur hockey, however. In 1932 he was a member of the American ice hockey team, which won the silver medal. He played all six matches and scored four goals.

He was inducted into the United States Hockey Hall of Fame in 1973.

== Head coaching record ==
Record table
Season	Team	Overall	Conference	Standing	Postseason
Harvard Crimson (Quadrangular League) (1942–1943)
1942–43	Harvard	14-4-1			
Harvard Crimson Independent (1945–1946)
1945–46	Harvard	2-4-2			
Harvard Crimson (Pentagonal League) (1946–1950)
1946–47	Harvard	6-6-0			
1947–48	Harvard	9-14-0			
1948–49	Harvard	12-8-0			
1949–50	Harvard	10-8-0			
Harvard:		53-44-3			
Total:		53-44-3			
National champion Postseason invitational champion Conference regular season champion Conference regular season and conference tournament champion Division regular season champion Division regular season and conference tournament champion Conference tournament champion
