= Jim Benning =

Canadian ice hockey executive & player

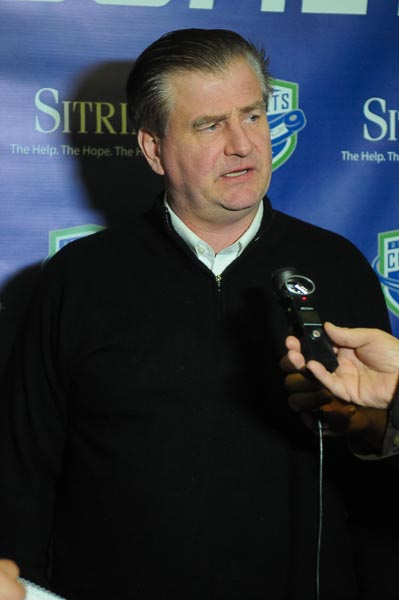
- Benning in December 2014
- Born: April 29, 1963 (age 63) Edmonton, Alberta, Canada
- Height: 6 ft 0 in (183 cm)
- Weight: 190 lb (86 kg; 13 st 8 lb)
- Position: Defence
- Shot: Left
- Played for: Toronto Maple Leafs; Vancouver Canucks
- NHL draft: 6th overall, 1981; Toronto Maple Leafs
- Playing career: 1981–1992

James Elmer Benning (born April 29, 1963) is a Canadian former professional ice hockey executive and former player. He formerly served as the general manager of the Vancouver Canucks of the National Hockey League (NHL). Drafted in the first round, sixth overall, in the 1981 NHL entry draft by the Toronto Maple Leafs, he played 610 games over nine seasons for the Maple Leafs and the Canucks, compiling 52 goals and 243 points. He was identified during his playing career as an offensive defenceman.

== Playing career ==
=== Junior hockey ===
Prior to his professional career, Benning played for the Fort Saskatchewan Traders of the Alberta Junior Hockey League and the Portland Winter Hawks of the Western Hockey League. While with the Winter Hawks in 1980–81, he set league records for most consecutive games with an assist (30) and with a point (45) while compiling 28 goals and a league-leading 111 assists (also a league record for defencemen) for 139 points and being named the league's top defenceman.

At the conclusion of the 1980–81 season, the NHL Central Scouting Bureau ranked Benning as the second-best North American draft-eligible prospect behind only Dale Hawerchuk. His performance in the WHL garnered interest from several National Hockey League scouts, including Johnny Bower of the Toronto Maple Leafs. Maple Leafs' general manager Punch Imlach expressed a desire to select a defenceman in the first round of the 1981 NHL entry draft due to the organization's lack of prospect defencemen at the time, prompting Bower to recommend the selection of Benning. At the Leafs' following rookie camp, Benning impressed onlookers with strong demonstrations of puck-handling, passing, shooting and skating, although Leafs coach Mike Nykoluk stated he needed to "carry his stick with two hands, not one."

=== Professional career ===
Benning joined the Toronto Maple Leafs for the 1981–82 season. After his rookie season, Benning participated in an exhibition match for Team Canada at the 1982 World Ice Hockey Championships, although he did not participate in the tournament. Following a difficult season with the Leafs, coach Mike Nykoluk openly questioned whether the lineup's influx of prospects was the correct decision for the roster. Though Benning's puck-handling skills provided him with security within the team's lineup, critics wanted him to play with greater physicality. He remained with the team, while two of the Leafs' other prospect defencemen, Bob McGill and Fred Boimistruck, were demoted to the Leafs' American Hockey League affiliate, St. Catharines Saints. Some analysts believed he was rushed into the NHL, resulting in lost confidence while playing for a struggling Leafs team.

In his third year with the Leafs, Benning experienced a breakout season in which he scored 51 points. At the midway point of the season, speculation existed that he and teammate Börje Salming would be chosen to represent the Campbell Conference All Stars at the 36th National Hockey League All-Star Game. The Leafs also considered nominating Benning for the Bill Masterton Memorial Trophy, although they ultimately selected Gary Nylund instead. By the 1985–86 season, he had become a crucial member of the team's defence corps, paired on many occasions with Al Iafrate and used in crucial situations. He became the team's leading point-scorer among defencemen in their 1983–84 and 1984–85 seasons and was praised for his playmaking abilities, but he experienced a knee injury partway through the 1985–86 season. Benning tore his right-knee ligaments in a collision with a St. Louis Blues player, resulting in eight weeks out of the Leafs' lineup. The 1985–86 season was also his option year, providing him with multiple decisions regarding his future with the Leafs organization. Benning expressed uncertainty about the team's interest in retaining him, believing he would play elsewhere, as they had experienced some success while he was injured the previous season. In addition, the Leafs had recently hired new coach John Brophy, whose physical brand of hockey was believed not to be compatible with Benning's style of play. Benning stated later that, during the team's 1986 preseason training camp, Brophy discussed with him the type of defencemen he wanted: larger defencemen who fought and demonstrated toughness.

One month into the 1986–87 season, Benning was demoted to the Newmarket Saints of the AHL. On December 2, 1986, Benning was traded to the Vancouver Canucks along with Dan Hodgson in exchange for Rick Lanz. The Canucks required offense and, subsequent to Lanz's trade request, a deal occurred between the two organizations.

Benning spent the next four seasons with the Canucks, becoming a veteran with the team, as well as scoring 12 goals and 70 points in that span despite some injuries. His style of play during this period was described as "effective but rarely conspicuous." Benning was described as becoming a more conservative, albeit more complete player with the Canucks. Early in the 1989–90 season, he was considered one of the Canucks' best performers in the absence of Paul Reinhart. The Canucks, according to coach Bob McCammon, however, found greater success without Benning in their lineup, though it was "no reflection on him." Benning believed he was playing well, resulting in confusion between the two sides. Following a streak of nine consecutive games scratched from the Canucks' lineup, the team requested that Benning be demoted to their International Hockey League affiliate Milwaukee Admirals, although he declined. After a brief period of uncertainty with the Canucks in which he was told not to attend practice, Benning was asked to rejoin the team after an injury to Harold Snepsts vacated a roster position. He experienced a three-point game in his return, but was scratched again for the remainder of the season afterward due to the organization's belief that he was too small.

After the conclusion of the 1989–90 season, Benning signed a termination contract with the Vancouver Canucks. Early in the subsequent preseason, Benning was sidelined with a bruised knee. A month later, he was reassigned to the Milwaukee Admirals as the Canucks sought to trade him. He concluded the 1990–91 season with the Admirals. Benning then joined HC Varese of the Serie A Italian hockey league, playing 18 games for them. Prior to the start of the 1992–93 season, Benning was invited to the Tampa Bay Lightning's inaugural training camp. He was one of the final cuts made to the Lightning roster before the start of the season. Benning subsequently retired as a player in 1992.

== Executive career ==
Following his playing career, Benning served as an amateur scout for the Mighty Ducks of Anaheim during their inaugural 1993–94 season. The following year, he joined the Buffalo Sabres as a scout, serving four years for the organization before being promoted to their position of director of amateur scouting in 1998. Benning remained in that role until 2004. In the summer of 2006, he became the assistant general manager of the Boston Bruins. His name was included on the Stanley Cup for the first time with the Bruins after their Stanley Cup Championship in 2011. The Vancouver Canucks formally introduced him as their general manager in a press conference on May 23, 2014. Upon being hired by the Canucks, he opted to retool his team by making several changes to the roster. In his first off-season with the organization, he made several roster moves including the firing of head coach John Tortorella after just one season on the job following by trading of forward Ryan Kesler to the Anaheim Ducks (at Kesler's request) at the 2014 NHL entry draft, the signing of goaltender Ryan Miller and the acquisition of several players such as Nick Bonino, Linden Vey, Radim Vrbata, and Derek Dorsett. On June 28, 2016, during his third off-season with the Canucks, the NHL fined the Canucks $50,000 due to "tampering" by Benning. At the 2016 NHL entry draft, Benning made inappropriate comments about attempting to acquire Montreal Canadiens defenceman P. K. Subban and pending unrestricted free-agent centre Steven Stamkos, who was still under contract with the Tampa Bay Lightning. On July 25, 2018 Canucks president of hockey operations Trevor Linden stepped down from his position with the team. Subsequently, team owner Francesco Aquilini announced that Benning would assume Linden's duties until a new team President was named. Benning was given a three-year contract extension in August 20, 2019. On December 5, 2021, Benning was fired as general manager of the Canucks along with head coach Travis Green after a home loss against the Pittsburgh Penguins. The Canucks qualified for the playoffs only twice during the eight seasons in which Benning was general manager.

== Personal life ==
Benning is married and has four children. He lives downtown in Vancouver, British Columbia during the season and Sherwood, Oregon in the summer. His father, Elmer Benning (1941–2018), was a scout for the Montreal Canadiens. Former NHL player Brian Benning and former college hockey All-American Mark Benning are his brothers. Another brother, Craig, was the General Manager of the Dawson Creek Senior Canucks of the North Peace Hockey League. He is the uncle of hockey players Matt Benning, and Michael Benning.

== Career statistics ==
			Regular season					Playoffs
Season	Team	League	GP	G	A	Pts	PIM	GP	G	A	Pts	PIM
1978–79	Fort Saskatchewan Traders	AJHL	45	14	57	71	10	—	—	—	—	—
1978–79	Portland Winter Hawks	WHL	—	—	—	—	—	3	0	0	0	0
1979–80	Portland Winter Hawks	WHL	71	11	60	71	42	8	3	9	12	8
1980–81	Portland Winter Hawks	WHL	72	28	111	139	61	9	1	5	6	16
1981–82	Toronto Maple Leafs	NHL	74	7	24	31	46	—	—	—	—	—
1982–83	Toronto Maple Leafs	NHL	74	5	17	22	47	4	1	1	2	2
1983–84	Toronto Maple Leafs	NHL	79	12	39	51	66	—	—	—	—	—
1984–85	Toronto Maple Leafs	NHL	80	9	35	44	55	—	—	—	—	—
1985–86	Toronto Maple Leafs	NHL	52	4	21	25	71	—	—	—	—	—
1986–87	Newmarket Saints	AHL	10	1	5	6	0	—	—	—	—	—
1986–87	Toronto Maple Leafs	NHL	5	0	0	0	4	—	—	—	—	—
1986–87	Vancouver Canucks	NHL	59	2	11	13	40	—	—	—	—	—
1987–88	Vancouver Canucks	NHL	77	7	26	33	58	—	—	—	—	—
1988–89	Vancouver Canucks	NHL	65	3	9	12	48	3	0	0	0	0
1989–90	Vancouver Canucks	NHL	45	3	9	12	26	—	—	—	—	—
1990–91	Milwaukee Admirals	IHL	66	1	31	32	75	6	0	0	0	0
1991–92	HC Varese	Serie A	18	0	12	12	14	7	0	2	2	50
WHL totals			143	39	171	210	103	20	4	14	18	24
NHL totals			610	52	191	243	461	7	1	1	2	2

== Awards ==
- WHL First All-Star Team – 1981

Preceded by Laurie Boschman	Toronto Maple Leafs first-round draft pick 1981	Succeeded by Gary Nylund
Preceded by Mike Gillis	General manager of the Vancouver Canucks; 2014–2021	Succeeded by Stan Smyl (interim)
