= Bob McManama =

American ice hockey player

- Born: October 7, 1951 (age 74) Belmont, Massachusetts, U.S.A.
- Height: 6 ft 0 in (183 cm)
- Weight: 181 lb (82 kg; 12 st 13 lb)
- Position: Center
- Shot: Left
- Played for: Pittsburgh Penguins; New England Whalers
- National team: United States
- NHL draft: Undrafted
- Playing career: 1973–1976

Robert Spang McManama (born October 7, 1951) is an American retired professional ice hockey player. He played 99 games in the National Hockey League for the Pittsburgh Penguins and 37 games in the World Hockey Association for the New England Whalers from 1973 to 1976. He was also a member of the American national team at the 1972 and 1973 World Championships.

== Career statistics ==
=== Regular season and playoffs ===
			Regular season					Playoffs
Season	Team	League	GP	G	A	Pts	PIM	GP	G	A	Pts	PIM
1968–69	Belmont Hill School	HS-MA	—	—	—	—	—	—	—	—	—	—
1969–70	Harvard University	ECAC	—	—	—	—	—	—	—	—	—	—
1970–71	Harvard University	ECAC	27	13	32	45	36	—	—	—	—	—
1971–72	Harvard University	ECAC	26	24	30	54	34	—	—	—	—	—
1972–73	Harvard University	ECAC	22	27	25	52	33	—	—	—	—	—
1973–74	Hershey Bears	AHL	26	10	18	28	12	—	—	—	—	—
1973–74	Pittsburgh Penguins	NHL	47	5	14	19	18	—	—	—	—	—
1974–75	Hershey Bears	AHL	21	9	12	21	19	—	—	—	—	—
1974–75	Pittsburgh Penguins	NHL	40	5	9	14	6	8	0	1	1	6
1975–76	Hershey Bears	AHL	8	3	3	6	6	—	—	—	—	—
1975–76	Pittsburgh Penguins	NHL	12	1	2	3	4	—	—	—	—	—
1975–76	New England Whalers	WHA	37	3	10	13	28	12	4	3	7	4
1975–76	Binghamton Dusters	NAHL	5	3	5	8	0	—	—	—	—	—
WHA totals			37	3	10	13	28	12	4	3	7	4
NHL totals			99	11	25	36	28	8	0	1	1	6

=== International ===
Year	Team	Event	GP	G	A	Pts	PIM
1972	United States	WC-B	6	1	1	2	8
1973	United States	WC-B	7	4	10	14	—
Senior totals			13	5	11	16	—

== Awards and honors ==
Award	Year
All-ECAC Hockey Second Team	1971–72
All-ECAC Hockey First Team	1972–73
AHCA East All-American	1972–73
