= Gary Nylund =

Canadian ice hockey player (born 1963)

- Born: October 28, 1963 (age 62) Surrey, British Columbia, Canada
- Height: 6 ft 4 in (193 cm)
- Weight: 203 lb (92 kg; 14 st 7 lb)
- Position: Defence
- Shot: Left
- Played for: Toronto Maple Leafs; Chicago Blackhawks; New York Islanders
- National team: Canada
- NHL draft: 3rd overall, 1982; Toronto Maple Leafs
- Playing career: 1982–1993

Gary Nylund (born October 28, 1963) is a Canadian former professional ice hockey player who played in 608 National Hockey League games for the Toronto Maple Leafs, Chicago Blackhawks and New York Islanders.

== Overview ==
Nylund was born in Surrey, British Columbia and raised in North Delta, British Columbia. He was selected third overall by Toronto in the 1982 NHL entry draft.

Nylund became the first NHL player to change teams via free agency requiring compensation when he left the Maple Leafs after signing an offer sheet with the Chicago Blackhawks in 1986.

Following his retirement, Nylund became a firefighter in Delta, British Columbia. He was awarded the Medal of Bravery in 2004 for his part in saving the lives of two fellow firefighters in a 2001 chemical fire at a paper mill on Annacis Island in B.C.

Nylund was a part-owner and assistant coach of the BCHL Surrey Eagles franchise from 2010 to 2012, and returned in a coaching role for the 2015-16 season.

== Career statistics ==
=== Regular season and playoffs ===
			Regular season					Playoffs
Season	Team	League	GP	G	A	Pts	PIM	GP	G	A	Pts	PIM
1978–79	Delta Suns	BCHL	57	6	29	35	107	—	—	—	—	—
1978–79	Portland Winter Hawks	WHL	2	0	0	0	0	—	—	—	—	—
1979–80	Portland Winter Hawks	WHL	72	5	21	26	59	8	0	1	1	2
1980–81	Portland Winter Hawks	WHL	70	6	40	46	186	9	1	7	8	17
1981–82	Portland Winter Hawks	WHL	65	7	59	66	267	15	3	16	19	74
1982–83	Toronto Maple Leafs	NHL	16	0	3	3	16	—	—	—	—	—
1983–84	Toronto Maple Leafs	NHL	47	2	14	16	103	—	—	—	—	—
1984–85	Toronto Maple Leafs	NHL	76	3	17	20	99	—	—	—	—	—
1985–86	Toronto Maple Leafs	NHL	79	2	16	18	180	10	0	2	2	25
1986–87	Chicago Blackhawks	NHL	80	7	20	27	190	4	0	2	2	11
1987–88	Chicago Blackhawks	NHL	76	4	15	19	208	5	0	0	0	10
1988–89	Chicago Blackhawks	NHL	23	3	2	5	63	—	—	—	—	—
1988–89	New York Islanders	NHL	46	4	8	12	74	—	—	—	—	—
1989–90	New York Islanders	NHL	64	4	21	25	144	5	0	2	2	17
1990–91	New York Islanders	NHL	72	2	21	23	105	—	—	—	—	—
1991–92	Capital District Islanders	AHL	4	0	0	0	0	—	—	—	—	—
1991–92	New York Islanders	NHL	7	0	1	1	10	—	—	—	—	—
1992–93	Capital District Islanders	AHL	2	0	0	0	0	—	—	—	—	—
1992–93	New York Islanders	NHL	22	1	1	2	43	—	—	—	—	—
NHL totals			608	32	139	171	1235	24	0	6	6	63

=== International ===
Year	Team	Event	GP	G	A	Pts	PIM
1982	Canada	WJC	7	1	3	4	0

== Awards ==
- WHL Second All-Star Team – 1981
- WHL First All-Star Team – 1982

Preceded by Jim Benning	Toronto Maple Leafs first-round draft pick 1982	Succeeded by Russ Courtnall
