= Michael Benning =

Canadian ice hockey player (born 2002)

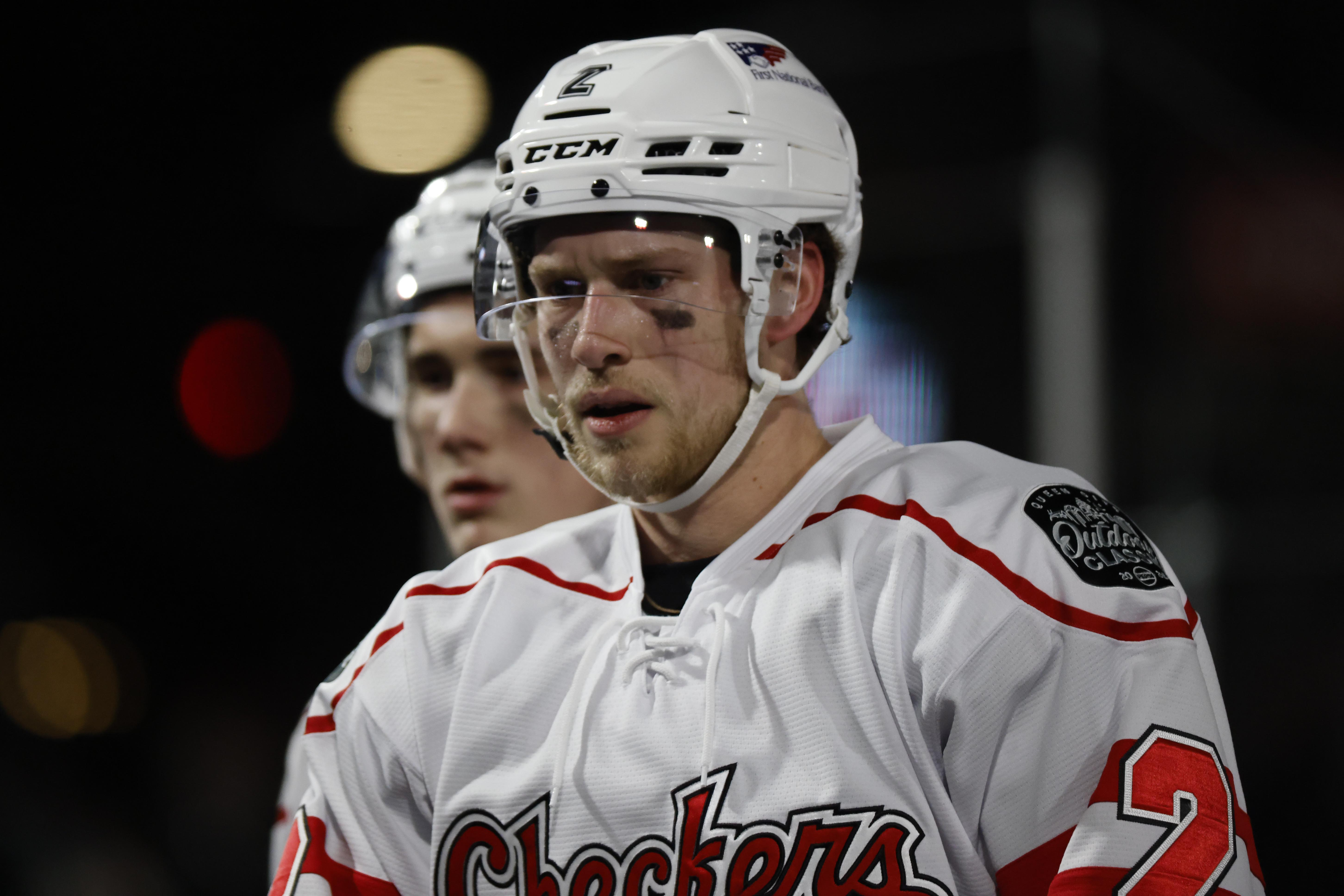
- Benning with the Charlotte Checkers at the 2024 AHL Outdoor Classic
- Born: January 5, 2002 (age 24) St. Albert, Alberta, Canada
- Height: 5 ft 9 in (175 cm)
- Weight: 185 lb (84 kg; 13 st 3 lb)
- Position: Defence
- Shoots: Right
- NHL team (P) Cur. team Former teams: Calgary Flames; Calgary Wranglers (AHL); Florida Panthers
- NHL draft: 95th overall, 2020; Florida Panthers
- Playing career: 2023–present

Michael Benning (born January 5, 2002) is a Canadian professional ice hockey defenceman for the Calgary Wranglers of the American Hockey League (AHL) as a prospect to the Calgary Flames of the National Hockey League (NHL). He was named as the Tournament Most Outstanding Player in the 2022 NCAA Division I Men's Ice Hockey Tournament while representing the University of Denver.

== Playing career ==
Benning played junior hockey for his team in the Alberta Major Bantam Hockey League (AMBHL). During his freshman year in high school, he averaged over a point per game and graduated to the Northern Alberta Elite program. After another outstanding offensive season he began playing Junior A for the Sherwood Park Crusaders in 2018. In his first season with the team, Benning was one of the clubs top scorers and helped them finish second in the league standings. He was named an alternate captain for the following year and continued to put up big numbers. Benning helped the Crusaders win the regular season title, however, the campaign was ended prematurely due to the COVID-19 pandemic. By then, however, he had already shown enough promise for the Florida Panthers to select him in the fourth round of the 2020 NHL entry draft.

After graduating, Benning, along with Sherwood Park teammates Reid Irwin and Carter Savoie, travelled south and began attending the University of Denver. Due in part to a late start and a shortened season, the Denver Pioneers had a poor performance that saw them finish with a losing record for the first time in over 20 years. Despite the difficulties, Denver was still ranked 13th in the preseason poll entering the 2021–22 season. Benning spearheaded the attack from the blueline and helped the Pioneers swiftly rise up the rankings. By the end of the regular season, Denver finished in a tie for the conference title and was guaranteed an NCAA tournament bid. During the postseason, Benning proved to be pivotal in Denver's success, helping the team win three one-goal games to reach the championship match. With his team down in the third period of the final, Benning assisted on the game-tying goal and then scored what proved to be the deciding marker less than three minutes later. After also assisting on the Pioneers' overtime goal in the national semifinal, he was named Tournament Most Outstanding Player.

Following the conclusion of his junior season with the Pioneers in 2022–23, Benning ended his collegiate career in signing a three-year, entry-level contract with the Florida Panthers on April 13, 2023.

On August 14, 2025, Benning signed a one-year, two-way contract to remain with Florida. During the 2025–26 season, Benning made his NHL debut with the Florida Panthers on March 12th, 2026, picking up an assist on Sam Reinhart's overtime goal in a 2–1 win against the Columbus Blue Jackets. In 18 games with the Panthers, Benning scored 2 goals and 4 assists for 6 points. He was later returned to the Checkers and played 57 games with the notching 8 goals and 23 assists to lead all Checkers defenceman in points with 31.

After three seasons within the Panthers organization, Benning left as a free agent and was signed to a one-year, two-way contract with the Calgary Flames for the 2026–27 season on July 1, 2026.

== Personal life ==
Benning is the son of former Panthers defenceman Brian Benning, nephew of former Vancouver Canucks general manager Jim Benning, and the younger brother of Toronto Marlies defenceman Matthew Benning. Rounding out a full pedigree in a hockey family was uncle Mark Benning who played in the NCAA and professionally in the West German Eishockey-Bundesliga, and grandfather Elmer Benning (1941–2018), a scout for the Montreal Canadiens.

== Career statistics ==
| | | | Regular season | | | | | Playoffs |
| Season | Team | League | GP | G | A | Pts | PIM | GP | G | A | Pts | PIM |
|---|---|---|---|---|---|---|---|---|---|---|---|---|
| 2018–19 | Sherwood Park Crusaders | AJHL | 60 | 10 | 51 | 61 | 99 | 12 | 1 | 8 | 9 | 14 |
| 2019–20 | Sherwood Park Crusaders | AJHL | 54 | 12 | 63 | 75 | 54 | — | — | — | — | — |
| 2020–21 | University of Denver | NCHC | 21 | 3 | 8 | 11 | 8 | — | — | — | — | — |
| 2021–22 | University of Denver | NCHC | 41 | 15 | 23 | 38 | 14 | — | — | — | — | — |
| 2022–23 | University of Denver | NCHC | 39 | 13 | 21 | 34 | 38 | — | — | — | — | — |
| 2023–24 | Charlotte Checkers | AHL | 72 | 9 | 17 | 26 | 50 | 3 | 0 | 1 | 1 | 2 |
| 2024–25 | Charlotte Checkers | AHL | 54 | 9 | 23 | 32 | 34 | 18 | 5 | 4 | 9 | 12 |
| 2025–26 | Charlotte Checkers | AHL | 57 | 8 | 23 | 31 | 40 | 3 | 0 | 2 | 2 | 2 |
| 2025–26 | Florida Panthers | NHL | 18 | 2 | 4 | 6 | 2 | — | — | — | — | — |
| NHL totals | | | 18 | 2 | 4 | 6 | 2 | — | — | — | — | — |

== Awards and honours ==
| Award | Year | Ref |
College
| All-NCHC First Team | 2022–23 | |
| All-NCHC Second Team | 2021–22 | |
| All-Tournament Team | 2022 | |
| AHCA West Second Team All-American | 2022–23 | |

Awards and achievements
| Preceded by Bobby Trivigno | NCAA Tournament Most Outstanding Player; 2022 | Succeeded by Jacob Quillan |
| Preceded by Ronnie Attard | NCHC Offensive Defenseman of the Year; 2022–23 | Succeeded by Zeev Buium |
