= Fred Moseley =

American ice hockey player

Frederick Russell Moseley, Jr. (13 July 1913 in Brookline, Massachusetts – 10 March 1989) was an ice hockey player. Moseley was named an All-American ice hockey while at Harvard University in 1934. He was inducted into the United States Hockey Hall of Fame in 1975. He was later a banker with the firm J.P. Morgan & Co. rising from trainee to Executive Vice President.
