= Matt Benning =

Canadian ice hockey player (born 1994)

- Born: May 25, 1994 (age 32) St. Albert, Alberta, Canada
- Height: 6 ft 1 in (185 cm)
- Weight: 203 lb (92 kg; 14 st 7 lb)
- Position: Defence
- Shoots: Right
- NHL team Former teams: Free agent Edmonton Oilers; Nashville Predators; San Jose Sharks; Toronto Maple Leafs
- NHL draft: 175th overall, 2012; Boston Bruins
- Playing career: 2016–present

Matthew Benning (born May 25, 1994) is a Canadian professional ice hockey player who is a defenceman and an unrestricted free agent. He previously played for the Edmonton Oilers, Nashville Predators, San Jose Sharks, Toronto Maple Leafs. He was selected 175th overall in the 2012 NHL entry draft by the Boston Bruins.

== Playing career ==
Benning played two seasons of Junior A hockey for the Spruce Grove Saints of the Alberta Junior Hockey League (AJHL), one season with the Dubuque Fighting Saints junior team, then played for the Northeastern University Huskies from 2013 to 2016.

=== Professional (2016–present) ===
==== Edmonton Oilers (2016–2020) ====
As Benning remained an unsigned draft pick of the Boston Bruins, he opted to sign a two-year, entry-level contract with his hometown club, the Edmonton Oilers, on August 27, 2016.

After attending his first Oilers training camp, he unexpectedly made the Oilers opening night roster for the 2016–17 season. After sitting as a healthy scratch, he was reassigned to make his professional debut with American Hockey League (AHL) affiliate, the Bakersfield Condors. After two games with the Condors, Benning was recalled and made his NHL debut against the Toronto Maple Leafs on November 1, 2016. He scored his first NHL goal against Cory Schneider of the New Jersey Devils on January 7, 2017. On February 3, in a game against the Carolina Hurricanes, Benning suffered a concussion after he was hit by Hurricanes’ forward Viktor Stålberg, resulting in him missing the next 20 games.

==== Nashville Predators (2020–2022) ====
As an impending restricted free agent and due to salary cap considerations, Benning was not tendered a qualifying offer by the Oilers on October 7, 2020, and was released to free agency. On October 9, Benning signed a two-year contract with the Nashville Predators.

==== San Jose Sharks (2022–2024) ====
At the conclusion of his contract with the Predators, Benning left as a free agent and was signed to a four-year contract with the San Jose Sharks on July 13, 2022. On December 3, 2023, Benning suffered a season-ending injury, which required a hip surgery. Before the injury he recorded two assists in 14 games during that season.

After seven games in the 2024–25 season, on October 30, 2024, the Sharks traded Benning and two draft picks to the Toronto Maple Leafs, in exchange for Timothy Liljegren. Benning did not play for the Maple Leafs since the trade, and after clearing waivers, was assigned to AHL affiliate, the Toronto Marlies.

== Personal life ==
Benning was born in St. Albert, Alberta in 1994. He is the son of former NHL defenceman Brian Benning, who was born in Edmonton and played for the same AJHL Saints franchise (then located in St. Albert) 27 years before his son, and also featured with the Oilers through his 10-year career. His uncle, Jim Benning, played 10 seasons as an NHL defenceman and is the former general manager of the NHL's Vancouver Canucks.

Benning is the older brother of Florida Panthers defenceman Michael Benning.

== Career statistics ==
			Regular season					Playoffs
Season	Team	League	GP	G	A	Pts	PIM	GP	G	A	Pts	PIM
2010–11	Spruce Grove Saints	AJHL	43	0	7	7	65	13	0	1	1	20
2011–12	Spruce Grove Saints	AJHL	44	4	14	18	87	11	2	1	3	16
2012–13	Dubuque Fighting Saints	USHL	57	10	16	26	73	11	1	1	2	6
2013–14	Northeastern University	HE	33	3	10	13	28	—	—	—	—	—
2014–15	Northeastern University	HE	36	0	24	24	36	—	—	—	—	—
2015–16	Northeastern University	HE	41	6	13	19	37	—	—	—	—	—
2016–17	Bakersfield Condors	AHL	2	1	1	2	0	—	—	—	—	—
2016–17	Edmonton Oilers	NHL	62	3	12	15	29	12	0	3	3	12
2017–18	Edmonton Oilers	NHL	73	6	15	21	49	—	—	—	—	—
2018–19	Edmonton Oilers	NHL	70	5	12	17	33	—	—	—	—	—
2019–20	Edmonton Oilers	NHL	43	1	7	8	15	4	0	1	1	6
2019–20	Bakersfield Condors	AHL	3	0	1	1	2	—	—	—	—	—
2020–21	Nashville Predators	NHL	53	1	3	4	30	5	0	0	0	6
2021–22	Nashville Predators	NHL	65	0	11	11	39	3	0	1	1	0
2022–23	San Jose Sharks	NHL	77	1	23	24	26	—	—	—	—	—
2023–24	San Jose Sharks	NHL	14	0	2	2	14	—	—	—	—	—
2024–25	San Jose Sharks	NHL	7	0	0	0	4	—	—	—	—	—
2024–25	Toronto Marlies	AHL	39	1	7	8	26	2	0	0	0	2
2025–26	Toronto Marlies	AHL	34	3	13	16	23	11	0	3	3	20
2025–26	Toronto Maple Leafs	NHL	1	0	0	0	0	—	—	—	—	—
NHL totals			465	17	85	102	239	24	0	5	5	24

== Awards and honours ==
Award	Year
AHL
Calder Cup champion	2026

== See also ==
- List of family relations in the National Hockey League
