= Goodwin Harding =

American ice hockey player

- Born: December 11, 1920 Brookline, Massachusetts, U.S.
- Died: May 11, 1951 (aged 30) Dedham, Massachusetts, U.S.
- Position: Goaltender
- National team: United States
- Playing career: 1942–1948

Goodwin Warner Harding (December 11, 1920 - May 11, 1951) was an American ice hockey goaltender who competed in ice hockey at the 1948 Winter Olympics. He graduated from Harvard University.

Harding was a member of the American ice hockey team which played eight games, but was disqualified, at the 1948 Winter Olympics. Harding played in six games as the goaltender.
