= Austie Harding =

American ice hockey player

Francis Austin Harding (September 26, 1917 in Boston, Massachusetts – February 25, 1991 in Natick, Massachusetts) was an ice hockey player. Harding was named an All-American while at Harvard University. In 1938, he won the John Tudor Memorial Cup as the most valuable player. He was inducted into the United States Hockey Hall of Fame in 1974.
