= 2004 ECAC Hockey men's ice hockey tournament =

2004 ECAC Men's ice hockey tournament
- Dates: March 5–20, 2004
- Teams: 12
- Finals site: Pepsi Arena; Albany, New York
- Champions: Harvard (7th title)
- Winning coach: Mark Mazzoleni (2nd title)
- MVP: Brendan Bernakevitch (Harvard)
- ECAC Men's Ice Hockey Tournaments

The 2004 ECAC Hockey Men's Ice Hockey Tournament was the 43rd tournament in league history. It was played between March 5 and March 20, 2004. First Round and Quarterfinal games were played at home team campus sites, while the final four games were played at the Pepsi Arena in Albany, New York. By winning the tournament, Harvard received the ECAC's automatic bid to the 2004 NCAA Division I Men's Ice Hockey Tournament.

== Format ==
The tournament featured four rounds of play. The teams that finish above fifth place in the standings receive a bye to the quarterfinal round. In the first round, the fifth and twelfth seeds, the sixth and eleventh seeds, the seventh and tenth seeds and the eighth and ninth seeds played a best-of-three series with the winners advancing to the quarterfinals. In the quarterfinals the one seed plays the lowest remaining seed, the second seed plays the second-lowest remaining seed, the third seed plays the third-lowest remaining seed and the fourth seed plays the fourth-lowest remaining seed another best-of-three series with the winners of these the series advancing to the Semifinals. In the semifinals the top remaining seed plays the lowest remaining seed while the two remaining teams play against each other. The winners of the semifinals play in the championship game while the losers play in a third-place game. All series after the quarterfinals are single-elimination games. The tournament champion receives an automatic bid to the 2004 NCAA Men's Division I Ice Hockey Tournament.

== Conference standings ==
Note: GP = Games played; W = Wins; L = Losses; T = Ties; PTS = Points; GF = Goals For; GA = Goals Against

2003–04 ECAC Hockey standings
	Conference							Overall					
	GP	W	L	T	PTS	GF	GA	GP	W	L	T	GF	GA
Colgate†	22	14	6	2	30	65	44	39	22	12	5	111	80
Cornell	22	13	6	3	29	53	32	32	16	10	6	85	62
Brown	22	13	7	2	28	62	40	31	15	11	5	80	60
Dartmouth	22	10	5	7	27	66	60	34	14	11	9	95	91
Rensselaer	22	13	8	1	27	70	44	39	22	15	2	116	89
#13 Harvard*	22	10	10	2	22	58	55	36	18	15	3	104	94
Yale	22	10	12	0	20	65	88	31	12	19	0	89	134
Union	22	8	11	3	19	46	52	36	14	17	5	89	108
Clarkson	22	8	12	2	18	51	61	41	18	18	5	121	113
St. Lawrence	22	7	12	3	17	62	67	41	14	21	6	104	119
Vermont	22	7	14	1	15	57	79	35	9	22	4	85	127
Princeton	22	5	15	2	12	50	83	31	5	24	2	62	122
Championship: Harvard † indicates conference regular season champion (Cleary Cup) * indicates conference tournament champion (Whitelaw Cup); Final rankings: USA Today/American Hockey Magazine Poll Top 15 Poll

== Bracket ==
Teams are reseeded after the First Round and Quarterfinals

First Round; March 5–6
5	Rensselaer	5	3*	–
12	Princeton	4	2	–
6	Harvard	3	5	–
11	Vermont	0	3	–
7	Yale	3	3	–
10	St. Lawrence	4*	4*	–
8	Union	3	2	–
9	Clarkson	8	5	–

Quarterfinals; March 12–14
1	Colgate	1	1	2
10	St. Lawrence	2	0	1
2	Cornell	5	4	1
9	Clarkson	1	5	5
3	Brown	2	2	–
6	Harvard	4	3*	–
4	Dartmouth	1	6	1
5	Rensselaer	3	0	0

Semifinals; March 19
1	Colgate	1
9	Clarkson	2
4	Dartmouth	1
6	Harvard	2

Championship; March 20
9	Clarkson	2
6	Harvard	4
Third Place
1	Colgate	3
4	Dartmouth	2

Note: * denotes overtime period(s)

=== First round ===
==== (5) Rensselaer vs. (12) Princeton ====
March 5	Rensselaer	5 – 4	Princeton	Houston Field House	Recap
(Pickett) Ryan Shields – 04:56		First period	No scoring
(Economakos, MacDonald) Kevin Croxton – PP – 06:26 (Economakos, Basiuk) Brad Farnuk – PP – 16:59		Second period	08:40 – Sebastian Borza
(Basiuk, Eizenman) Kevin Croxton – 04:48 (MacDonald, Barr) Nick Economakos – GW PP – 13:23		Third period	07:30 – Patrick Neundorfer (Powe, Young); 16:32 – Darroll Powe (Goeckner-Zoeller); 17:48 – Sharam Fouladger-Mercer (Maglione, Goeckner-Zoeller)
( 22 saves / 26 shots ) Nathan Marsters		Goalie stats	Eric Leroux ( 18 saves / 23 shots )

March 6	Rensselaer	3 – 2	OT	Princeton	Houston Field House	Recap
(Barr) Nick Economakos – 01:28		First period		No scoring
No scoring		Second period		03:21 – PP – Sharam Fouladger-Mercer (Young, Slaton); 15:43 – PP – Dustin Sproat (Neundorfer, Maglione)
(Barr) Scott Basiuk – 17:37		Third period		No scoring
(McNeely, Economakos) Ben Barr – GW – 01:38		First overtime period		No scoring
( 18 saves / 20 shots ) Nathan Marsters		Goalie stats		Eric Leroux ( 41 saves / 44 shots )

Rensselaer won series 2–0

==== (6) Harvard vs. (11) Vermont ====
March 5	Harvard	3 – 0	Vermont	Bright Hockey Center	Recap
(Mandes, Kolarik) Kevin Du – GW – 01:40		First period	No scoring
(Cavanagh, Bernakevitch) Tyler Kolarik – PP – 15:03		Second period	No scoring
(Packard, Hafner) Ryan Maki – 06:40		Third period	No scoring
( 19 saves / 19 shots ) Dov Grumet-Morris		Goalie stats	Travis Russell ( 19 saves / 22 shots )

March 6	Harvard	5 – 3	Vermont	Bright Hockey Center	Recap
(Maki, Lannon) Brendan Bernakevitch – 18:27		First period	No scoring
(Cavanagh, Pettit) Brendan Bernakevitch – PP – 17:51 (Welch, Bernakevitch) Rob Fried – 19:09		Second period	No scoring
(Fried, Welch) Dennis Packard – GW – 04:24 (Cavanagh, Pettit) Rob Fried – EN – 19:09		Third period	04:55 – Scott Mifsud (Child, Mounsey); 17:11 – EA PP – Scott Mifsud (Gunderson, Miles); 17:40 – EA PP – Jaime Sifers (Gunderson, Miles)
( 21 saves / 24 shots ) Dov Grumet-Morris		Goalie stats	Travis Russell ( 25 saves / 29 shots )

Harvard won series 2–0

==== (7) Yale vs. (10) St. Lawrence ====
March 5	Yale	3 – 4	OT	St. Lawrence	Ingalls Rink	Recap
(Hristovski) Ryan Steeves – 00:14 (Burns) Nate Jackson – 07:53		First period		15:00 – PP – T. J. Trevelyan (Peverlay, Zeiler)
No scoring		Second period		05:57 – Stace Page (Bagnall); 19:42 – Jamie Parker (Anderson, McKenna)
(Callahan, Jensen) Nate Jackson – PP – 18:31		Third period		No scoring
No scoring		First overtime period		18:42 – GW – Stace Page (Taylor)
( 17 saves / 18 shots ) Josh Gartner / ( 38 saves / 41 shots ) Peter Dobrowolski		Goalie stats		Mike McKenna ( 39 saves / 42 shots )

March 6	Yale	3 – 4	OT	St. Lawrence	Ingalls Rink	Recap
No Scoring		First period		03:59 – Jeremy Cormier (Hogg, Rank); 09:50 – Drew Bagnall (Peverley)
(Jensen) Vin Hellemeyer – SH – 17:18		Second period		17:47 – PP – Rich Peverley (Trevelyan, Zeiler)
(Hellemeyer, Callahan) Christian Jensen – PP – 13:50 (Callahan, Dwyer) Vin Hellemeyer – EA – 18:51		Third period		No scoring
No scoring		First overtime period		05:14 – GW – Rich Peverley (Zeiler)
( 34 saves / 38 shots ) Matt Modelski		Goalie stats		Mike McKenna ( 32 saves / 35 shots ))

St. Lawrence won series 2–0

==== (8) Union vs. (9) Clarkson ====
March 5	Union	3 – 8	Clarkson	Achilles Center	Recap
(Webb, Poirier) Matt Vogvolgyi – 10:01		First period	08:46 – PP – Chris Blight (Sullivan, Faulkner); 17:11 – Jeff Genovy (Sullivan)
No scoring		Second period	08:01 – Lyon Porter (McKinven, Genovy); 12:54 – GW – Jay Latulippe (Desrochers); 14:19 – Mac Faulkner (Porter, Sullivan)
(Vogvolgyi, Webb) Jonathan Poirier – PP – 10:07 (Webb, Vogvolgyi) Jonathan Poirier – PP – 17:20		Third period	09:48 – EN SH – Chris Blight (Faulkner, Brekelmans); 10:58 – EN SH – Mac Faulkner (Blight); 19:25 – Lyon Porter (Grenzy, McKinven)
( 14 saves / 20 shots ) Kris Mayotte		Goalie stats	Dustin Traylen ( 21 saves / 24 shots )

March 6	Union	2 – 5	Clarkson	Achilles Center	Recap
No Scoring		First period	03:33 – Mac Faulkner (Grenzy, Sullivan); 07:20 – PP – Chris Blight (Latulippe, Faulkner); 14:15 – GW – Tristan Lush (Desrochers, Edwards)
No scoring		Second period	No scoring
(Beal, Poirier) Jordan Webb – 00:44 (Bouchard) Jason Visser – 13:54		Third period	08:30 – PP – Chris Brekelmans (Edwards, Lush); 14:56 – Jay Latulippe (McFeeters, Scuderi)
( 18 saves / 22 shots ) Kris Mayotte / ( 4 saves / 5 shots ) Tim Roth		Goalie stats	Dustin Traylen ( 26 saves / 28 shots )

Clarkson won series 2–0

=== Quarterfinals ===
==== (1) Colgate vs. (10) St. Lawrence ====
March 12	Colgate	1 – 2	St. Lawrence	Starr Arena	Recap
(Spencer, Smyth) Adam Mitchell – 00:16		First period	17:12 – PP – Kyle Rank (Glenn, Zeiler)
No scoring		Second period	No scoring
No scoring		Third period	13:25 – GW – Josh Anderson (Glenn, Taylor)
( 26 saves / 28 shots ) Steve Silverthorn		Goalie stats	Mike McKenna ( 34 saves / 35 shots )

March 13	Colgate	1 – 0	St. Lawrence	Starr Arena	Recap
No Scoring		First period	No scoring
(Masotto, Smyth) Justin Spencer – GW – 02:04		Second period	No scoring
No scoring		Third period	No scoring
( 25 saves / 25 shots ) Steve Silverthorn		Goalie stats	Mike McKenna ( 28 saves / 29 shots )

March 14	Colgate	2 – 1	St. Lawrence	Starr Arena	Recap
(Thomas, Campaner) Darryl McKinnon – PP – 10:05		First period	No scoring
(Smyth) Mike Campaner – GW – 14:00		Second period	00:58 – PP – Rich Peverley (Glenn, Page)
No scoring		Third period	No scoring
( 26 saves / 27 shots ) Steve Silverthorn		Goalie stats	Mike McKenna ( 24 saves / 26 shots ) / Kevin Ackley ( 0 saves / 0 shots )

Colgate won series 2–1

==== (2) Cornell vs. (9) Clarkson ====
March 12	Cornell	5 – 1	Clarkson	Lynah Rink	Recap
(Iggulden, Bitz) Mike Knoepfli – 06:08 (Iggulden) Charlie Cook – GW – 10:06 (Glover) Chris Abbott – 15:40		First period	No scoring
(Cook, Vesce) Mike Knoepfli – PP – 10:48		Second period	No scoring
(Bitz, Cook) Mike Knoepfli – 06:26		Third period	16:18 – PP – Jay Latulippe (Nickerson)
( 16 saves / 17 shots ) David McKee		Goalie stats	Dustin Traylen ( 20 saves / 25 shots )

March 13	Cornell	4 – 5	Clarkson	Lynah Rink	Recap
(Iggulden, O'Byrne) Mitch Carefoot – 09:40 (Cook, Iggulden) Mitch Carefoot – 13:07 (O'Byrne) Mike Knoepfli – 19:33		First period	05:12 – Lyon Porter (Nickerson); 05:48 – Ken Scuderi (McFeeters, Latulippe); 10:24 – PP – Mac Faulkner (Scuderi, Blight)
(Maulson, Hynes) Ben Wallace – PP – 16:26		Second period	05:05 – Rob McFeeters (Blight)
No scoring		Third period	02:29 – GW PP – Mike Sullivan (Lush, Rutherglen)
( 22 saves / 27 shots ) David McKee		Goalie stats	Dustin Traylen ( 29 saves / 33 shots )

March 14	Cornell	1 – 5	Clarkson	Lynah Rink	Recap
No Scoring		First period	05:20 – PP – Chris Blight (Latulippe)
No scoring		Second period	19:03 – GW SH – Mac Faulkner (Curley)
(Abbott, Wallace) Cam Abbott – PP – 09:33		Third period	06:44 – Jamie McKinven (Lush); 10:09 – Trevor Edwards (Lush); 17:41 – Mac Faulkner (Blight)
( 20 saves / 24 shots ) David McKee		Goalie stats	Dustin Traylen ( 26 saves / 27 shots )

Clarkson won series 2–1

==== (3) Brown vs. (6) Harvard ====
March 12	Brown	2 – 4	Harvard	Meehan Auditorium	Recap
No Scoring		First period	No scoring
(Ringstad, Row) Brent Robinson – 09:20		Second period	00:24 – Noah Welch (Johnson, Cavanagh); 15:24 – Tyler Kolarik (Bernakevitch, Pettit)
(Macri, Haggett) Brent Robinson – PP – 19:50		Third period	03:42 – GW – Tim Pettit (Cavanagh); 11:57 – PP – Brendan Bernakevitch (Reese, Kolarik)
( 23 saves / 27 shots ) Yann Danis		Goalie stats	Dov Grumet-Morris ( 28 saves / 30 shots )

March 13	Brown	2 – 3	OT	Harvard	Meehan Auditorium	Recap
(Bauer) Shane Mudryk – 12:31		First period		No scoring
(Crosty) Shane Mudryk – 10:36		Second period		11:03 – Tim Pettit (Johnson)
No scoring		Third period		02:06 – PP – Tyler Kolarik (Welch, Bernakevitch)
No scoring		First overtime period		07:35 – GW – Tom Cavanagh (Reese)
( 39 saves / 42 shots ) Yann Danis		Goalie stats		Dov Grumet-Morris ( 30 saves / 32 shots )

Harvard won series 2–0

==== (4) Dartmouth vs. (5) Rensselaer ====
March 12	Dartmouth	1 – 3	Rensselaer	Thompson Arena	Recap
No Scoring		First period	19:06 – Kirk MacDonald (Economakos, Barr)
No scoring		Second period	10:11 – GW PP – Scott Basiuk (Valentin, MacDonald)
(Stempniak) Mike Ouellette – PP – 04:59		Third period	19:03 – EN – Nick Economakos (Barr Farynuk)
( 27 saves / 29 shots ) Dan Yacey		Goalie stats	Nathan Marsters ( 34 saves / 35 shots )

March 13	Dartmouth	6 – 0	Rensselaer	Thompson Arena	Recap
(Van Abel, Stempniak) Jarrett Sampson – GW – 11:51 (Ouellette, Jessiman) Lee Stempniak – 16:34		First period	No scoring
(Offers, Stempniak) Mike Ouellette – 18:29		Second period	No scoring
(Szymanski) Eric Przepiorka – 05:01 (Turner, Costa) Dan Shribman – 09:28 (Shribman, Costa) Mike Turner – PP – 18:28		Third period	No scoring
( 33 saves / 33 shots ) Dan Yacey		Goalie stats	Nathan Marsters ( 30 saves / 35 shots ) / Andrew Martin ( 4 saves / 5 shots )

March 14	Dartmouth	1 – 0	Rensselaer	Thompson Arena	Recap
No Scoring		First period	No scoring
No scoring		Second period	No scoring
(Glass, Offers) Eric Przepiorka – GW – 00:21		Third period	No scoring
( 32 saves / 32 shots ) Dan Yacey		Goalie stats	Nathan Marsters ( 35 saves / 36 shots )

Dartmouth won series 2–1

=== Semifinals ===
==== (1) Colgate vs. (9) Clarkson ====
March 19	Colgate	1 – 2	Clarkson	Pepsi Arena	Recap
Kyle Wilson – 18:20		First period	03:01 – EA – Matt Curley (Rutherglen, McKinven)
No scoring		Second period	14:34 – GW – Michael Grenzy (Genovy, Porter)
No scoring		Third period	No scoring
( 32 saves / 34 shots ) Steve Silverthorn		Goalie stats	Dustin Traylen ( 27 saves / 28 shots )

==== (4) Dartmouth vs. (6) Harvard ====
March 19	Dartmouth	1 – 2	Harvard	Pepsi Arena	Recap
No Scoring		First period	No scoring
(Van Abel) Lee Stempniak – 19:18		Second period	11:40 – Dave McCulloch
No scoring		Third period	00:33 – GW – Brendan Bernakevitch (Hafner, Lannon)
( 31 saves / 33 shots ) Dan Yacey		Goalie stats	Dov Grumet-Morris ( 30 saves / 31 shots )

=== Third place ===
==== (1) Colgate vs. (4) Dartmouth ====
March 20	Colgate	3 – 2	Dartmouth	Pepsi Arena	Recap
(Mitchell) Darryl McKinnon – PP – 12:14		First period	08:57 – Max Guimond (Jarvis, Marr)
Dave Thomas – 14:42		Second period	No scoring
Rob Brown – GW – 18:40		Third period	10:29 – PP – Mike Ouellette (Szymanski, Stempniak)
( 29 saves / 32 shots ) David Cann		Goalie stats	Sean Samuel ( 35 saves / 37 shots )

=== Championship ===
==== (6) Harvard vs. (9) Clarkson ====
March 20	Harvard	4 – 2	Clarkson	Pepsi Arena	Recap
No Scoring		First period	18:39 – Chris Blight (Faulkner); 17:31 – Tristan Lush (Grenzy)
(Bernakevitch, Pettit) Tom Cavanagh – PP – 00:10 (McCulloch, Reese) Tom Cavanagh – 04:50		Second period	No scoring
(Bernakevitch) Kenny Smith – GW – 19:22 (Cavanagh, Welch) Dennis Packard – EN – 19:47		Third period	No scoring
( 14 saves / 16 shots ) Dov Grumet-Morris		Goalie stats	Dustin Traylen ( 21 saves / 24 shots )

== Tournament awards ==
=== All-Tournament Team ===
- F Tom Cavanagh (Harvard)
- F Brendan Bernakevitch* (Harvard)
- F Tristan Lush (Clarkson)
- D Dave McCulloch (Harvard)
- D Michael Grenzy (Clarkson)
- G Dov Grumet-Morris (Harvard)

* Most Outstanding Player(s)

=== Tournament Three Stars ===
- 3 Rob Brown (Harvard)
- 2 Dustin Traylen (Dartmouth)
- 1 Tom Cavanagh (Cornell)
