= 2003 ECAC Hockey men's ice hockey tournament =

2003 ECAC Men's ice hockey tournament
- Dates: March 7–22, 2003
- Teams: 12
- Finals site: Pepsi Arena; Albany, New York
- Champions: Cornell (10th title)
- Winning coach: Mike Schafer (3rd title)
- MVP: David LeNeveu (Cornell)
- ECAC Men's Ice Hockey Tournaments

The 2003 ECAC Hockey Men's Ice Hockey Tournament was the 42nd tournament in league history. It was played between March 7 and March 22, 2003. First Round and Quarterfinal games were played at home team campus sites, while the final four games were played at the Pepsi Arena in Albany, New York. By winning the tournament, Cornell received the ECAC's automatic bid to the 2003 NCAA Division I Men's Ice Hockey Tournament.

The 2003 Tournament was the first to include 4 rounds of play as well as all member schools of ECAC Hockey in the postseason championship.

== Format ==
The tournament featured four rounds of play. The teams that finish above fifth place in the standings receive a bye to the quarterfinal round. In the first round, the fifth and twelfth seeds, the sixth and eleventh seeds, the seventh and tenth seeds and the eighth and ninth seeds played a best-of-three series with the winners advancing to the quarterfinals. In the quarterfinals the one seed plays the lowest remaining seed, the second seed plays the second-lowest remaining seed, the third seed plays the third-lowest remaining seed and the fourth seed plays the fourth-lowest remaining seed in another best-of-three series with the winners of these the series advancing to the Semifinals. In the semifinals, the top remaining seed plays the lowest remaining seed while the two remaining teams play against each other. The winners of the semifinals play in the championship game while the losers play in a third-place game. All series after the quarterfinals are single-elimination games. The tournament champion receives an automatic bid to the 2003 NCAA Men's Division I Ice Hockey Tournament.

== Conference standings ==
Note: GP = Games played; W = Wins; L = Losses; T = Ties; PTS = Points; GF = Goals For; GA = Goals Against

2002–03 ECAC Hockey standings
	Conference							Overall					
	GP	W	L	T	PTS	GF	GA	GP	W	L	T	GF	GA
#1 Cornell†*	22	19	2	1	39	89	29	36	30	5	1	133	49
#10 Harvard	22	17	4	1	35	94	47	34	22	10	2	133	78
Dartmouth	22	13	9	0	26	77	71	34	20	13	1	127	110
Yale	22	13	9	0	26	94	73	32	18	14	0	121	107
Brown	22	10	8	4	24	65	54	35	16	14	5	96	83
Union	22	10	10	2	22	62	68	36	14	18	4	105	113
Clarkson	22	9	10	3	21	69	56	35	12	20	3	96	99
Colgate	22	9	10	3	21	49	71	40	17	19	4	96	127
St. Lawrence	22	7	12	3	17	65	80	37	11	21	5	103	129
Vermont	22	8	14	0	16	58	85	36	13	20	3	104	142
Rensselaer	22	4	15	3	11	49	84	40	12	25	3	94	134
Princeton	22	2	18	2	6	46	99	31	3	26	2	62	140
Championship: Cornell † indicates conference regular season champion (Cleary Cup) * indicates conference tournament champion (Whitelaw Cup); Final rankings: USA Today/American Hockey Magazine Poll Top 15 Poll

== Bracket ==
Teams are reseeded after the first round and quarterfinals

First round March 7–9
5	Brown	2	3	–
12	Princeton	1	1	–
6	Union	1	2	–
11	Rensselaer	2	3	–
7	Clarkson	2	1	–
10	Vermont	3	6	–
8	Colgate	1	3*	5
9	St. Lawrence	2	2	2

Quarterfinals; March 14–16
1	Cornell	3	4	–
11	Rensselaer	2	0	–
2	Harvard	4	5	–
10	Vermont	2	1	–
3	Dartmouth	3	3	5
8	Colgate	4****	1	2
4	Yale	3	2	0
5	Brown	4*	1	4

Semifinals; March 21
1	Cornell	2
5	Brown	0
2	Harvard	5
3	Dartmouth	3

Championship; March 22
1	Cornell	3*
2	Harvard	2
Third place
3	Dartmouth	4
5	Brown	2

Note: * denotes overtime period(s)

=== First round ===
==== (5) Brown vs. (12) Princeton ====
March 7	Brown	2–1	Princeton	Meehan Auditorium	Recap
No scoring		First period	No scoring
No scoring		Second period	No scoring
(Haggett) Chris Swon – 07:19 (Kirley, Caouette) Pascal Denis – GW – 12:07		Third period	06:56 – Chris Owen (Colclough, Patton)
Yann Danis ( 30 saves / 31 shots )		Goalie stats	Eric Leroux ( 23 saves / 25 shots )

March 8	Brown	3–1	Princeton	Meehan Auditorium	Recap
No scoring		First period	No scoring
No scoring		Second period	No scoring
(Denis, Mudryk) Keith Kirley – 09:26 (Robinson, Tichauer) Chris Swon – GW – 09:50 (Korbl, Swon) Shane Mudryk – PP – 11:41		Third period	10:08 – SH – Matt Maglione (Sproat)
Yann Danis ( 36 saves / 37 shots )		Goalie stats	Eric Leroux ( 40 saves / 43 shots )

Brown won series 2–0

==== (6) Union vs. (11) Rensselaer ====
March 7	Union	1–2	Rensselaer	Achilles Rink	Recap
No scoring		First period	No scoring
No scoring		Second period	07:21 – Vic Pereira (McWilliams, Shields); 10:50 – GW PP – Kevin Croxton (Graham, Eberly)
(Seel) Chris Konnick – 06:40		Third period	No scoring
Kris Mayotte ( 14 saves / 16 shots )		Goalie stats	Nathan Marsters ( 37 saves / 38 shots )

March 8	Union	2–3	Rensselaer	Achilles Rink	Recap
No scoring		First period	No scoring
(Gillies, Goodjohn) Scott Seney – PP – 06:34		Second period	17:44 – Carson Butterwick (Cavosie, McWilliams)
(Gillies, Beal) Kris Goodjohn – PP – 09:53		Third period	11:47 – SH – Ben Barr (Economakos, Basiuk); 12:37 – GW SH – Ben Barr (Economakos, Basiuk)
Kris Mayotte ( 17 saves / 20 shots )		Goalie stats	Nathan Marsters ( 29 saves / 31 shots )

Rensselaer won series 2–0

==== (7) Clarkson vs. (10) Vermont ====
March 7	Clarkson	2–3	Vermont	Cheel Arena	Recap
No scoring		First period	No scoring
No scoring		Second period	07:03 – Phil Youngclaus (Leisenring, Miles)
(Bahen, McFeeters) Kevin O'Flaherty – EA – 18:13 (Bahen, O'Flaherty) Randy Jones – EA PP – 19:30		Third period	03:15 – Jeff Corey (Sifers, Gasparini); 19:02 – GW EN SH – Jaime Sifers
Mike Walsh ( 24 saves / 26 shots )		Goalie stats	Shawn Conschafter ( 27 saves / 29 shots )

March 8	Clarkson	1–6	Vermont	Cheel Arena	Recap
No scoring		First period	No scoring
(Jones) Chris Blight – 13:54		Second period	17:48 – PP – Jaime Sifers (Hajek, Busniuk)
No scoring		Third period	04:17 – GW PP – Brady Leisenring (Hajek); 08:38 – Brady Leisenring (Miles, Corey); 09:54 – Tim Plant (Longo); 17:40 – EN – Phil Youngclaus; 19:26 – Bryson Busniuk (Plant)
Dustin Traylen ( 25 saves / 30 shots )		Goalie stats	Shawn Conschafter ( 29 saves / 30 shots )

Vermont won series 2–0

==== (8) Colgate vs. (9) St. Lawrence ====
March 7	Colgate	1–2	St. Lawrence	Starr Rink	Recap
(Thomas) Steve Silversides – 10:20		First period	03:53 – Matt Macdonald (Peverley, Trevelyan)
No scoring		Second period	No scoring
No scoring		Third period	03:51 – GW – Ziga Petac (Anderson, Hogg)
Steve Silverthorn ( 16 saves / 18 shots )		Goalie stats	Kevin Ackley ( 37 saves / 38 shots )

March 8	Colgate	3–2	OT	St. Lawrence	Starr Rink	Recap
No scoring		First period		13:09 – PP – Ryan Glenn (Trevelyan, Zeiler)
(Smith, Mormina) P.J. Yedon – 00:47 (Tataryn, McKinnon) Kyle Wilson – 14:19		Second period		No scoring
No scoring		Third period		09:47 – T. J. Trevelyan (Glenn)
(Bria) P. J. Yedon – GW – 16:46		First overtime period		No scoring
Steve Silverthorn ( 26 saves / 28 shots )		Goalie stats		Kevin Ackley ( 36 saves / 39 shots )

March 9	Colgate	5–2	St. Lawrence	Starr Rink	Recap
Brad D'Arco – SH – 19:59		First period	No scoring
(Mitchell) P. J. Yedon – 04:28		Second period	08:18 – T. J. Trevelyan (Zeiler, Peverley); 16:31 – Adam Hogg (Lorentz, Anderson)
(Smyth, Smyth) Dave Thomas – GW – 01:57; Adam Mitchell – 17:10; Jon Smyth – EN – 19:17		Third period	No scoring
Steve Silverthorn ( 32 saves / 34 shots )		Goalie stats	Kevin Ackley ( 21 saves / 25 shots )

Colgate won series 2–1

=== Quarterfinals ===
==== (1) Cornell vs. (11) Rensselaer ====
March 14	Cornell	3–2	Rensselaer	Lynah Rink	Recap
(Bâby, Paolini) Ryan Vesce – PP – 03:27		First period	16:09 – Ben Barr (Eberly, MacDonald)
(Bâby, Vesce) Matt Moulson – 09:34		Second period	No scoring
(Cook, Abbott) Greg Hornby – GW – 07:07		Third period	10:50 – Brad Farynuk (Graham, Croxton)
David LeNeveu ( 17 saves / 19 shots )		Goalie stats	Nathan Marsters ( 23 saves / 26 shots )

March 15	Cornell	4–0	Rensselaer	Lynah Rink	Recap
(Bâby, Murray) Ryan Vesce – GW – 18:39		First period	No scoring
(Pegoraro, McRae) Mark Knoepfli – 04:42		Second period	No scoring
(Hornby) Cam Abbott – 03:59 (Paolini, McRae) Shane Hynes – 09:35		Third period	No scoring
David LeNeveu ( 16 saves / 16 shots )		Goalie stats	Nathan Marsters ( 29 saves / 33 shots )

Cornell won series 2–0

==== (2) Harvard vs. (10) Vermont ====
March 14	Harvard	4–2	Vermont	Bright Hockey Center	Recap
(Cavanagh, Johnson) Kenny Turano – PP – 03:41		First period	No scoring
(Nowak, Moore) Dennis Packard – PP – 14:41 (Moore, Turano) Dennis Packard – GW – 19:55		Second period	No scoring
(Fried, Nowak) Dennis Packard – 13:15		Third period	07:01 – PP – Thomas Hajek (Busniuk, Sifers); 09:29 – PP – Jeff Corey (Miller, Miller)
Dov Grumet-Morris ( 32 saves / 34 shots )		Goalie stats	Shawn Conschafter ( 35 saves / 39 shots )

March 15	Harvard	5–1	Vermont	Bright Hockey Center	Recap
(Nowak, Moore) Noah Welch – PP – 02:25 (Moore) Charlie Johnson – GW – 07:22 (Kim, McColloch) Rob Fried – 11:38		First period	No scoring
(Moore, Pettit) Brett Nowak – PP – 11:39		Second period	10:59 – Jeff Miles (Hajek, Miller)
(Welch) Dominic Moore – PP – 01:44		Third period	No scoring
Dov Grumet-Morris ( 22 saves / 23 shots ) / Ben Weiss ( 0 saves / 0 shots )		Goalie stats	Shawn Conschafter ( 37 saves / 42 shots ) / Travis Russell ( 2 saves / 2 shots )

Harvard won series 2–0

==== (3) Dartmouth vs. (7) Colgate ====
March 14	Dartmouth	3–4	4OT	Colgate	Thompson Arena	Recap
(Stempniak, Ouellette) Hugh Jessiman – PP – 06:14		First period		09:57 – PP – Scooter Smith (Yedon)
(Stempniak) Hugh Jessiman – 00:28		Second period		07:03 – Adam Mitchell (Yedon, Smith)
(Ouellette, Stempniak) Trevor Byrne – PP – 10:05		Third period		14:01 – Ryan Smyth (Doyle, McKinnon)
No scoring		Fourth overtime period		01:05 – GW – Kyle Wilson (Yedon)
Nick Boucher ( 66 saves / 70 shots )		Goalie stats		Steve Silverthorn ( 50 saves / 53 shots )

March 15	Dartmouth	3–1	Colgate	Thompson Arena	Recap
(Ouellette, Summerfelt) Lee Stempniak – PP – 06:14		First period	18:05 – Adam Mitchell (Smith)
No scoring		Second period	No scoring
(Ouellette, Summerfelt) Lee Stempniak – GW – 08:21 (Summerfelt) Lee Stempniak – EN – 19:12		Third period	No scoring
Nick Boucher ( 19 saves / 20 shots )		Goalie stats	Steve Silverthorn ( 41 saves / 43 shots )

March 16	Dartmouth	5–2	Colgate	Thompson Arena	Recap
(Przepiorka) Dacy Marr – 01:59		First period	01:20 – Brad D'Arco (Yedon, Yashin); 02:08 – Darryl McKinnon (Tataryn)
(Jessiman, Stempniak) Mike Ouellette – 05:33		Second period	No scoring
(Gaul, Summerfelt) Nathan Szymanski – GW – 05:53 (Murray, Wheelihan) P.J. Martin – 12:35 (Ouellette, Jessiman) Lee Stempniak – EN – 17:51		Third period	No scoring
Nick Boucher ( 26 saves / 28 shots )		Goalie stats	Steve Silverthorn ( 37 saves / 41 shots )

Dartmouth won series 2–1

==== (4) Yale vs. (5) Brown ====
March 14	Yale	3–4	OT	Brown	Ingalls Rink	Recap
(Wax, Higgins) Vin Hellemeyer – PP – 12:01		First period		04:06 – Cory Caouette (Ringstad, Burke)
(Hellemeyer) Chris Higgins – SH – 06:52		Second period		00:37 – Paul Esdale (Legg); 06:00 – Les Haggettsdale (Hellemeyer)
Christian Jensen – 17:07		Third period		No scoring
No scoring		First overtime period		09:40 – GW – Brent Robinson (Haggett, Swon)
Josh Gartner ( 31 saves / 35 shots )		Goalie stats		Yann Danis ( 41 saves / 44 shots )

March 15	Yale	2–1	Brown	Ingalls Rink	Recap
No scoring		First period	06:18 – Shane Mudryk (Denis, Kirley)
(Dwyer, Higgins) Ryan Steeves – PP – 09:11		Second period	No scoring
(Hristovski) Denis Nam – GW – 13:38		Third period	No scoring
Josh Gartner ( 24 saves / 25 shots )		Goalie stats	Yann Danis ( 34 saves / 36 shots )

March 16	Yale	0–4	Brown	Ingalls Rink	Recap
No scoring		First period	No scoring
No scoring		Second period	02:15 – GW – Brent Robinson; 13:48 – Jason Wilson
No scoring		Third period	17:29 – EN – Pascal Denis (Mudryk, Esdale); 19:11 – EN – Brent Robinson (Swon, Esdale)
Josh Gartner ( 26 saves / 28 shots )		Goalie stats	Yann Danis ( 35 saves / 35 shots )

Brown won series 2–1

=== Semifinals ===
==== (1) Cornell vs. (5) Brown ====
March 21	Cornell	2–0	Brown	Pepsi Arena	Recap
No scoring		First period	No scoring
(Abbott, Abbott) Greg Hornby – GW – 17:54		Second period	No scoring
(Pegoraro, Palahicky) Travis Bell – 07:06		Third period	No scoring
David LeNeveu ( 11 saves / 11 shots )		Goalie stats	Yann Danis ( 27 saves / 29 shots )

==== (2) Harvard vs. (3) Dartmouth ====
March 21	Harvard	5–3	Dartmouth	Pepsi Arena	Recap
(Kim, Murphy) David McCollouch – 04:23 (Moore, Turano) Charlie Johnson – 10:57		First period	No scoring
(Nowak, Packard) Tim Pettit – PP – 02:48 (Cavanagh, Lannon) Brendan Bernakevitch – GW PP – 07:59		Second period	01:37 – Kent Gillings (Murray, Byrne)
(Moore) Rob Flynn – EN – 19:55		Third period	13:26 – Hugh Jessiman (Stempniak, Ouellette); 16:09 – PS – Mike Murray
Dov Grumet-Morris ( 31 saves / 34 shots )		Goalie stats	Nick Boucher ( 11 saves / 15 shots ) / Dan Yacey ( 12 saves / 12 shots )

=== Third place ===
==== (3) Dartmouth vs. (5) Brown ====
March 22	Dartmouth	4–2	Brown	Pepsi Arena	Recap
No scoring		First period	No scoring
(Murray, Wheelihan) Kent Gillings – 12:29 (Snizek, Szymanski) Eric Przepiorka – 12:51		Second period	03:12 – Pascal Denis (Mudryk)
(Offers, Summerfeldt) Kent Gillings – GW – 03:24; Hugh Jessiman – EN – 19:16		Third period	07:50 – Mike Meech (Legg)
Dan Yacey ( 26 saves / 28 shots )		Goalie stats	Yann Danis ( 40 saves / 43 shots )

=== Championship ===
==== (1) Cornell vs. (2) Harvard ====
March 22	Cornell	3–2	OT	Harvard	Pepsi Arena	Recap
(Bâby, Vesce) Sam Paolini – PP – 01:53		First period		No scoring
No scoring		Second period		No scoring
(Vesce) Mark McRae – EA – 19:27		Third period		08:04 – Dominic Moore (Johnson, Kolarik); 16:14 – Tyler Kolarik (Nowak, Packard)
(McRae, Hynes) Sam Paolini – GW – 01:23		First overtime period		No scoring
David LeNeveu ( 25 saves / 27 shots )		Goalie stats		Dov Grumet-Morris ( 30 saves / 33 shots )

== Tournament awards ==
=== All-Tournament Team ===
- F Stephen Bâby (Cornell)
- F Dominic Moore (Harvard)
- F Brendan Bernakevitch (Harvard)
- D Douglas Murray (Cornell)
- D Travis Bell (Cornell)
- G Dov Grumet-Morris (Harvard)
- G Yann Danis (Brown)

=== Tournament Three Stars ===
- 3 Tyler Kolarik (Harvard)
- 2 Kent Gillings (Dartmouth)
- 1 Sam Paolini (Cornell)

=== MOP ===
- David LeNeveu (Cornell)

== Tournament notes ==
- In the first game of the quarterfinals Colgate defeated Dartmouth 4-3 in four overtimes the longest game in tournament history.
