= Dominic Moore =

Canadian ice hockey player (born 1980)

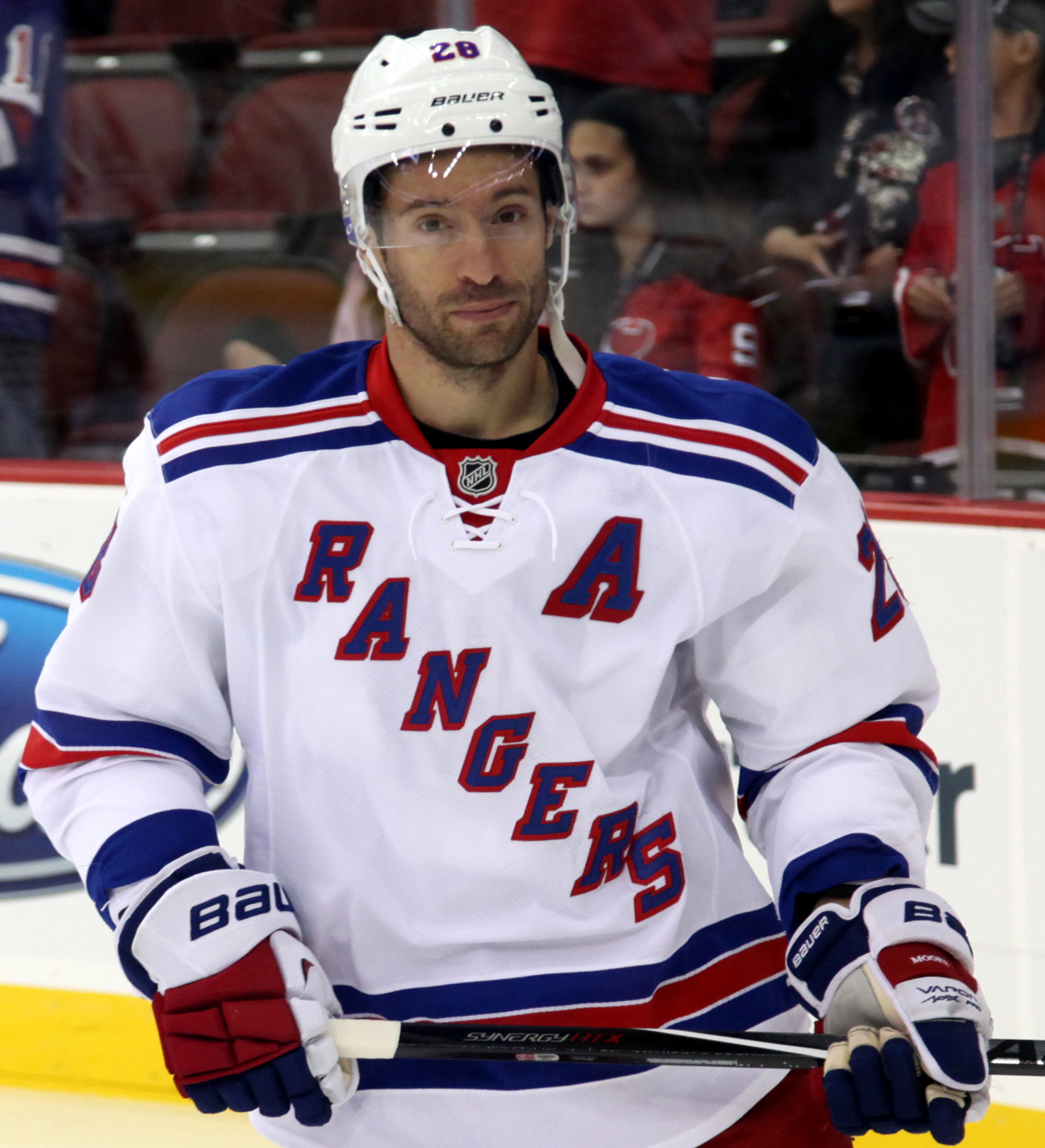
- Moore with the New York Rangers in 2014
- Born: August 3, 1980 (age 46) Thornhill, Ontario, Canada
- Height: 6 ft 0 in (183 cm)
- Weight: 188 lb (85 kg; 13 st 6 lb)
- Position: Centre
- Shot: Left
- Played for: New York Rangers; Pittsburgh Penguins; Minnesota Wild; Toronto Maple Leafs; Buffalo Sabres; Florida Panthers; Montreal Canadiens; Tampa Bay Lightning; San Jose Sharks; Boston Bruins; ZSC Lions
- NHL draft: 95th overall, 2000; New York Rangers
- Playing career: 2003–2019

Dominic Moore (born August 3, 1980) is a Canadian professional ice hockey analyst and former player who serves as the game and studio analyst for the Utah Mammoth. He played as a center, playing nearly 900 National Hockey League (NHL) games. Initially drafted in the third round, 95th overall, by the New York Rangers in the 2000 NHL entry draft, Moore also played in the NHL for the Pittsburgh Penguins, Minnesota Wild, Toronto Maple Leafs, Buffalo Sabres, Florida Panthers, Montreal Canadiens, Tampa Bay Lightning, San Jose Sharks and Boston Bruins.

== Early life ==
Moore attended both St. Michael Catholic Elementary School and St. Anthony's Catholic Elementary School in Thornhill, Ontario. As a youth, he played in the 1994 Quebec International Pee-Wee Hockey Tournament with a minor ice hockey team from Don Mills. He then attended high school at St. Michael's College School in Toronto, followed by Harvard University.

== Playing career ==
=== Amateur ===
Before his professional career, Moore played for the Thornhill Rattlers and Aurora Tigers of the OJHL. He then joined the Harvard Crimson in the NCAA's ECAC Hockey conference, as did his two brothers, Mark and Steve. In the 1999–2000 season, Dominic joined both older brothers on the Crimson ice hockey team, marking the first brother trio in school history to play at the same time. Moore is currently ranked 11th in all-time scoring at Harvard, also ranking tenth on the school's all-time goal-scoring list. At the 2000 NHL entry draft, he was selected in the third round, 95th overall, by the New York Rangers. Continuing his collegiate career, he played for the NCAA First All-American Team (East) in 2002–03.

=== Professional ===
==== New York Rangers ====
Moore began his professional career in the 2003–04 season, split between the New York Rangers and their minor league affiliate, the Hartford Wolf Pack of the American Hockey League (AHL). He made his NHL debut on November 1, 2003, against the Montreal Canadiens, where he tallied three assists in a 5–1 victory. He became the second player to score three points in his NHL debut with the Rangers, joining George Allen, who did so in 1938. Moore spent the majority of the season with the Wolf Pack. During the 2004–05 NHL lock-out, Moore remained with the Wolf Pack, finishing third on the team in scoring for the year.

Moore rejoined the Rangers at the start of the 2005–06 season, where he was placed on a defensive-minded line with Jed Ortmeyer and Ryan Hollweg. Through minor line-changes throughout the year, Moore continued his solid defensive play and continued to improve.

==== Pittsburgh Penguins, Minnesota Wild ====
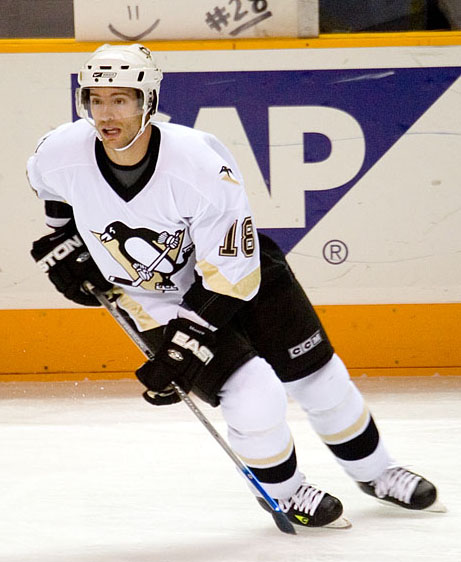
Moore with the Pittsburgh Penguins during the 2006–07 season.

On July 19, 2006, the Rangers traded Moore to the Pittsburgh Penguins in a three-team trade. During his tenure with the team, he recorded 15 points in 59 games.

On February 27, 2007, the Penguins traded Moore to the Minnesota Wild for a 2007 third-round draft pick. Moore finished the season with 17 points in 69 games.

==== Toronto Maple Leafs, Buffalo Sabres ====
On January 11, 2008, the Toronto Maple Leafs claimed Moore off of waivers from the Wild. His debut with the Maple Leafs came on January 12, 2008, against the San Jose Sharks. He was assigned to centre Toronto's top scoring line alongside left winger Jason Blake. On March 4, 2009, Moore was traded by Toronto to the Buffalo Sabres in exchange for a second-round draft pick. At the end of the 2008–09 season, he finished with career-highs in goals (13), assists (32) and points (45) in what remains his highest-scoring season to date.

==== Florida Panthers, Montreal Canadiens ====
On October 4, 2009, Moore signed a one-year, $1.1 million contract with the Florida Panthers. Halfway through the season, on February 11, 2010, he was traded to the Montreal Canadiens in exchange for a second-round draft pick in 2011. In the 2010 Stanley Cup playoffs, Moore scored the series-winning goal as the eighth-seeded Canadiens eliminated the Presidents' Trophy-winning Washington Capitals, and scored again in game 7 against the Penguins, though Montreal later lost the Eastern Conference Finals to the Philadelphia Flyers.

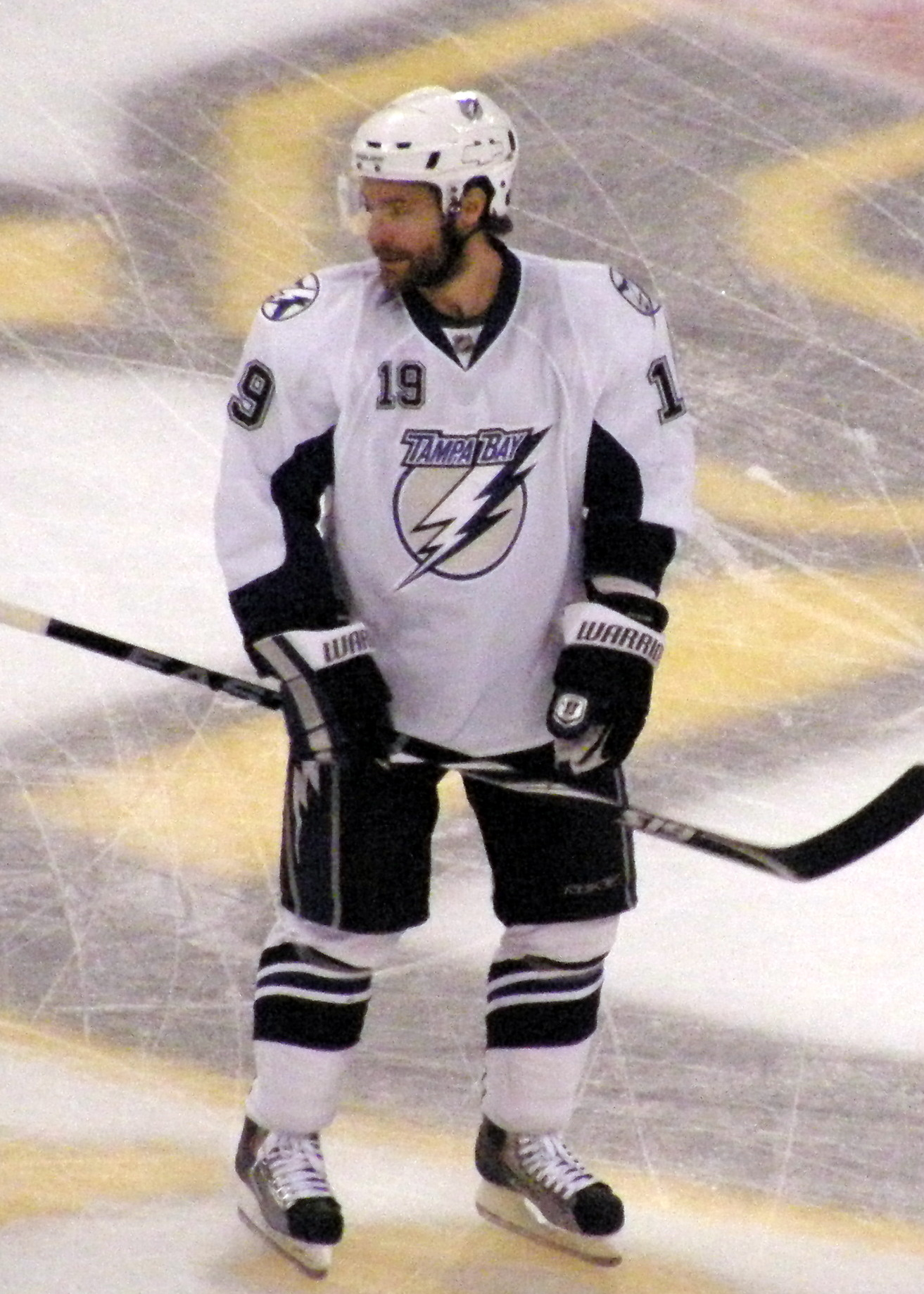
Moore with the Tampa Bay Lightning during the 2011 Eastern Conference Finals.

==== Tampa Bay Lightning, departure from hockey ====
Becoming a free agent following the season, Moore signed with the Tampa Bay Lightning on a two-year, $2.2 million contract. For the second-straight year, Moore reached the Eastern Conference Finals, though his team again was defeated, this time to the eventual Stanley Cup champions, the Boston Bruins.

On February 10, 2012, during the 2011–12 season, Moore was fined $2,500 for an interference infraction that injured the New York Rangers' Ruslan Fedotenko. On February 16, Moore was traded to the San Jose Sharks, along with a seventh-round draft pick, in exchange for a second-round pick. With the trade, it marked Moore's ninth NHL club and the seventh time in his career he has been traded.

Moore played just the first three games of the Sharks in the 2012 playoffs after learning his wife, Katie, had been diagnosed with liver cancer. He sat out the 2012–13 season to tend to Katie, who died in January 2013.

==== Return to the Rangers ====
He returned to hockey in the 2013 off-season by signing a one-year contract with the Rangers, the team that first drafted him in 2000.

Moore would be a crucial piece of the Rangers' deep 2014 playoff run, and his perseverance in returning after a tragic loss earned him the Bill Masterton Memorial Trophy. Reaching the Eastern Conference Finals for the third time in his career, Moore finally reached the Stanley Cup Final after scoring the only goal of Game 6 against the Montreal Canadiens, sending the Rangers to their first Final in 20 years. The Final, however, would be won in five games by the Los Angeles Kings.

On July 1, 2014, Moore re-signed with the Rangers on a two-year, $3 million contract.

==== Boston Bruins ====
After a successful three-year tenure with the Rangers, Moore as a free agent opted to join his 10th NHL club, in agreeing to a one-year contract with the Boston Bruins on August 30, 2016. In his lone season with the club, Moore recorded 25 points in 82 games.

==== Return to the Maple Leafs ====
On July 1, 2017, Moore, as a free agent, signed a one-year, $1 million contract to return for a second stint with the Maple Leafs. Early in the season, Moore battled with Eric Fehr for fourth-line centre role in Toronto, effectively winning the spot after the Maple Leafs waived Fehr in late October.

==== ZSC Lions ====
As a free agent from the NHL, Moore opted to continue his career abroad, joining Swiss club the ZSC Lions of the National League for the remainder of the season on a one-year contract on January 7, 2019.

== Personal life ==
Moore married Katie Urbanic on July 3, 2010, in Newport, Rhode Island. They bought a house in Cambridge, Massachusetts, in which Katie was very involved in planning and designing. She died on January 7, 2013, after a nine-month battle with liver cancer. Moore created a foundation in her name, The Katie Moore Foundation, to help those with rare forms of cancer. Moore took an 18-month leave to care for Urbanic.

Since 2012, Dominic has hosted Smashfest, a charity ping-pong tournament benefiting The Katie Moore Foundation and The Steve Moore Foundation.

A year after his wife's death, Dominic started dating Tennessee native Mary Hirst, a fellow Harvard graduate he met through mutual friends. They got engaged four months later and got married in July 2015.

Dominic has two older brothers: Mark and Steve Moore. Both Mark and Steve also played collegiate hockey for the Harvard Crimson, and Steve was also an NHL player who spent three years in the Colorado Avalanche organization after four years at Harvard.

== Career statistics ==
			Regular season					Playoffs
Season	Team	League	GP	G	A	Pts	PIM	GP	G	A	Pts	PIM
1996–97	Thornhill Rattlers	MetJHL	29	4	6	10	48	1	0	1	1	0
1997–98	Aurora Tigers	OPJHL	51	10	15	25	16	—	—	—	—	—
1998–99	Aurora Tigers	OPJHL	51	34	53	87	70	—	—	—	—	—
1999–2000	Harvard University	ECAC	30	12	12	24	28	—	—	—	—	—
2000–01	Harvard University	ECAC	32	15	28	43	40	—	—	—	—	—
2001–02	Harvard University	ECAC	32	13	16	29	37	—	—	—	—	—
2002–03	Harvard University	ECAC	34	24	27	51	30	—	—	—	—	—
2003–04	Hartford Wolf Pack	AHL	70	14	25	39	60	16	3	3	6	8
2003–04	New York Rangers	NHL	5	0	3	3	0	—	—	—	—	—
2004–05	Hartford Wolf Pack	AHL	78	19	30	49	78	6	1	1	2	4
2005–06	New York Rangers	NHL	82	9	9	18	28	4	0	0	0	2
2006–07	Pittsburgh Penguins	NHL	59	6	9	15	46	—	—	—	—	—
2006–07	Minnesota Wild	NHL	10	2	0	2	10	—	—	—	—	—
2007–08	Minnesota Wild	NHL	30	1	2	3	10	—	—	—	—	—
2007–08	Toronto Maple Leafs	NHL	38	4	10	14	14	—	—	—	—	—
2008–09	Toronto Maple Leafs	NHL	63	12	29	41	69	—	—	—	—	—
2008–09	Buffalo Sabres	NHL	18	1	3	4	23	—	—	—	—	—
2009–10	Florida Panthers	NHL	48	8	9	17	35	—	—	—	—	—
2009–10	Montreal Canadiens	NHL	21	2	9	11	8	19	4	1	5	6
2010–11	Tampa Bay Lightning	NHL	77	18	14	32	52	18	3	8	11	18
2011–12	Tampa Bay Lightning	NHL	56	4	15	19	48	—	—	—	—	—
2011–12	San Jose Sharks	NHL	23	0	6	6	6	3	0	0	0	5
2013–14	New York Rangers	NHL	73	6	12	18	18	25	3	5	8	24
2014–15	New York Rangers	NHL	82	10	17	27	28	19	1	2	3	12
2015–16	New York Rangers	NHL	80	6	9	15	32	5	1	0	1	6
2016–17	Boston Bruins	NHL	82	11	14	25	44	6	0	1	1	4
2017–18	Toronto Maple Leafs	NHL	50	6	6	12	16	2	0	0	0	0
2018–19	ZSC Lions	NL	11	0	1	1	6	—	—	—	—	—
NHL totals			897	106	176	282	487	101	12	17	29	77

== Awards and honours ==
Award	Year
College
All-ECAC Hockey Rookie Team	1999–00
Ivy League Rookie of the Year	1999–00
All-Ivy League Second Team	1999–00
George Pearcy Award (Harvard Rookie of the Year)	1999–00
All-ECAC Hockey Second Team	2000–01
All-Ivy League First Team	2000–01
All-Ivy League Second Team	2001–02
All-ECAC Hockey First Team	2002–03
AHCA East First-Team All-American	2002–03
ECAC Hockey All-Tournament Team	2003
John Tudor Cup - Harvard's MVP	2002–03
ECAC All-Decade Team	2000–09
NHL
Bill Masterton Memorial Trophy	2013–14

== See also ==
- Notable families in the NHL

Awards and achievements
Preceded by Josh Harding	Winner of the Bill Masterton Memorial Trophy; 2014	Succeeded by Devan Dubnyk
