= Dov Grumet-Morris =

American ice hockey player (born 1982)

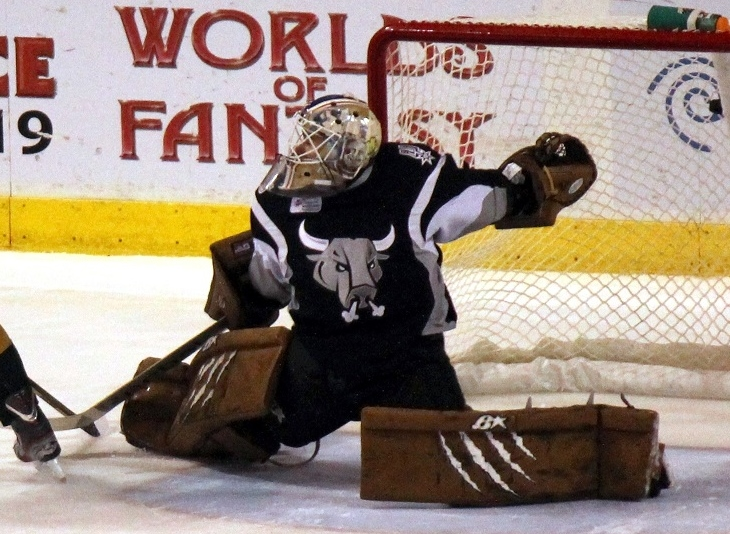
- Grumet-Morris with the San Antonio Rampage in 2014
- Born: February 28, 1982 (age 44) Evanston, Illinois, U.S.
- Height: 6 ft 2 in (188 cm)
- Weight: 198 lb (90 kg; 14 st 2 lb)
- Position: Goaltender
- Caught: Left
- Played for: San Antonio Rampage; Portland Pirates; Hamilton Bulldogs; Manitoba Moose; Milwaukee Admirals; Connecticut Whale; Graz 99ers HK Jesenice; Lørenskog IK; Hartford Wolf Pack
- NHL draft: 161st overall, 2002; Philadelphia Flyers
- Playing career: 2005–2014

Dov Grumet-Morris (born February 28, 1982) is an American former professional ice hockey goaltender who played in the American Hockey League (AHL). He played ten years of professional hockey in North America and Europe.

== Early life ==
Grumet-Morris, who is Jewish, was born in Evanston, Illinois, to Ken Grumet, an internist specializing in geriatric medicine who in college was a goaltender for City College of New York, and Mary Morris, a prosecutor. He attended Solomon Schechter Day School of Metropolitan Chicago, and then Evanston Township High School.

== Playing career ==
Grumet-Morris attended Harvard University, majoring and receiving a Bachelor of Arts degree in government and in Near Eastern languages and civilizations. He was drafted in the fifth round, 161st overall, by the Philadelphia Flyers in the 2002 NHL entry draft, though only played in minor league affiliates.

Grumet-Morris played collegiately for the Harvard Crimson men's ice hockey team before turning professional in 2005. He had 11 shutouts at Harvard, a record at the time, a 2.25 goals-against average, and a .924 save percentage. In 2004–05 he was NCAA (East) Second All-American Team, NCAA (ECAC) Second All-Star Team, NCAA (New England) Most Valuable Player, and won the NCAA (New England) Walter Brown Award. He was an Academic and Athletic All-American at Harvard.

He was part of the Central Hockey League's Laredo Bucks championship team in 2005–06. In 2006–07 Grumet-Morris played for the ECHL's Cincinnati Cyclones and was ECHL Goaltender of the Week (2/11–17), earning call-ups to the AHL's Portland Pirates, Hamilton Bulldogs, and Manitoba Moose.

Grumet-Morris was signed to a contract by the National Hockey League's Nashville Predators on July 2, 2007. He started the season with the Cyclones, and played the second half on call-up to the Milwaukee Admirals.

For the 2008–09 season Grumet-Morris signed with Graz 99ers of the Erste Bank Hockey League. On August 31, 2009, he went back to North America and signed with the Utah Grizzlies. He was signed by the Hartford Wolf Pack on October 18, 2010. The Wolf Pack changed their name to the Connecticut Whale part way through the season. In 2010–2011 he was ECHL Goaltender of the Month in December, ECHL Goaltender of the Week (11/29–12/5 and 12/6-12/12), and a member of the ECHL Second All-Star Team.

After performing admirably for the San Antonio Rampage during the 2011–12 season, Grumet-Morris was signed to a one-year contract with NHL affiliate, the Florida Panthers on July 1, 2012. On December 13, 2013, in the 2013–14 season, Grumet-Morris was traded to the Hartford Wolf Pack, for whom in 31 games he had a 2.43 goals against average, for future considerations.

== International career ==
Grumet-Morris has played in the World Jewish Championships in Israel twice, in 2007 and 2009. He won the gold medal both times, and beat Canada 6–0 in the 2009 Gold Medal Game.

== Awards and honors ==
Award	Year
All-ECAC Hockey Second Team	2004–05
ECAC Hockey All-Tournament Team	2003
AHCA East Second-Team All-American	2004–05
ECAC Hockey All-Tournament Team	2004

== See also ==
- List of select Jewish ice hockey players
