= Tom Cavanagh (ice hockey) =

American ice hockey player (1982–2011)

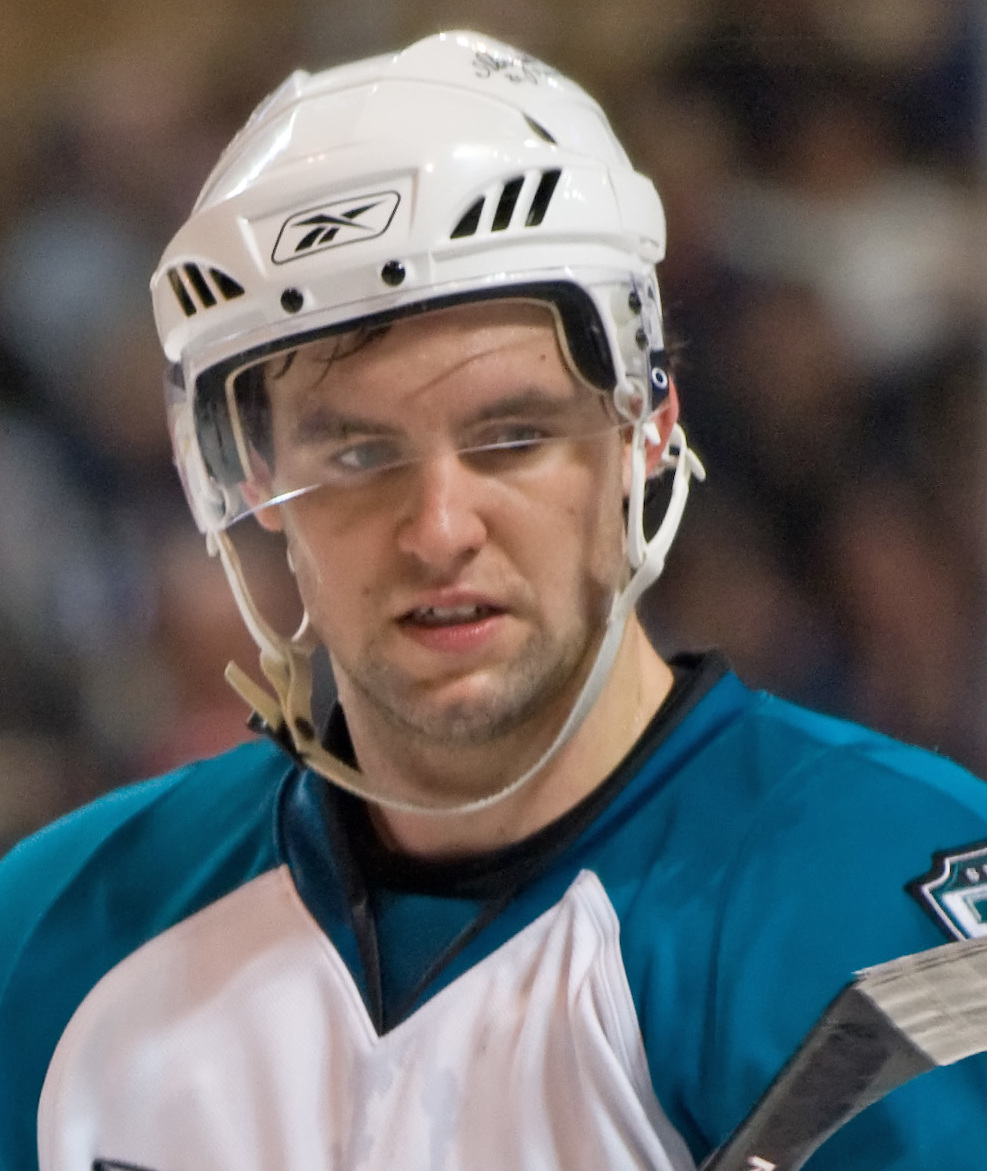
- Cavanagh with the Worcester Sharks in 2008
- Born: March 24, 1982 Warwick, Rhode Island, U.S.
- Died: January 6, 2011 (aged 28) Providence, Rhode Island, U.S.
- Height: 5 ft 10 in (178 cm)
- Weight: 180 lb (82 kg; 12 st 12 lb)
- Position: Center
- Shot: Left
- Played for: San Jose Sharks
- NHL draft: 182nd overall, 2001; San Jose Sharks
- Playing career: 2005–2011

Thomas Garrett Cavanagh (March 24, 1982 – January 6, 2011) was an American professional ice hockey center who last played with the Springfield Falcons of the American Hockey League. He was drafted by the San Jose Sharks in the sixth round, 182nd overall, of the 2001 NHL entry draft. After playing four seasons at Harvard University, he was signed to a professional contract by the Sharks organization.

Cavanagh made his National Hockey League debut with San Jose near the end of the 2007–08 season and recorded an assist on his first shift. The following season, he scored his lone NHL goal March 28, 2009, a backhand shot past Phoenix Coyotes goaltender Ilya Bryzgalov.

== Playing career ==
Cavanagh attended Phillips Exeter Academy.

Cavanagh was the first player to play every single one of the Harvard's games during his collegiate career. Cavanagh made his 138th consecutive appearance in a Crimson jersey in Harvard's final game of the 2005 NCAA Tournament.

Cavanagh is the Worcester Sharks' all-time scoring leader with 138 points in 202 games. Cavanagh holds the San Jose Sharks franchise record for quickest point by a rookie for an assist on a goal by Joe Thornton that came 36 seconds into Cavanagh's first game in the NHL.

== Death ==
Cavanagh was found dead in the Providence Place Mall parking garage on January 6, 2011. The cause of death was identified as multiple traumatic injuries due to blunt force impact. Police have stated that they believe the death to be a suicide. Cavanagh had been diagnosed with schizophrenia, and was institutionalized several times in the last months of his life. Cavanagh had been released from his contract with the Falcons on November 9, 2010.

== Career statistics ==
			Regular season					Playoffs
Season	Team	League	GP	G	A	Pts	PIM	GP	G	A	Pts	PIM
1997–98	Toll Gate High School	HSRI	15	5	17	22	6	4	2	8	10	4
1998–99	Toll Gate High School	HSRI	15	9	20	29	26	5	5	4	9	6
1999–2000	Toll Gate High School	HSRI	18	25	29	54	28	5	0	12	12	9
2000–01	Phillips Exeter Academy	HS Prep	31	42	40	82	34	—	—	—	—	—
2001–02	Harvard University	ECAC	34	8	17	25	4	—	—	—	—	—
2002–03	Harvard University	ECAC	34	14	13	27	31	—	—	—	—	—
2003–04	Harvard University	ECAC	36	16	20	36	26	—	—	—	—	—
2004–05	Harvard University	ECAC	34	10	19	29	22	—	—	—	—	—
2005–06	Cleveland Barons	AHL	62	10	11	21	36	—	—	—	—	—
2006–07	Worcester Sharks	AHL	74	12	32	44	56	6	1	0	1	6
2007–08	Worcester Sharks	AHL	77	19	36	55	55	—	—	—	—	—
2007–08	San Jose Sharks	NHL	1	0	1	1	0	—	—	—	—	—
2008–09	Worcester Sharks	AHL	51	15	24	39	37	12	3	2	5	8
2008–09	San Jose Sharks	NHL	17	1	1	2	4	—	—	—	—	—
2009–10	Manchester Monarchs	AHL	17	3	5	8	10	—	—	—	—	—
2010–11	Springfield Falcons	AHL	5	0	1	1	4	—	—	—	—	—
AHL totals			286	59	109	168	198	18	4	2	6	14
NHL totals			18	1	2	3	4	—	—	—	—	—

== Awards and honors ==
Award	Year
ECAC Hockey All-Tournament Team	2004
All-ECAC Hockey Second Team	2004–05

Awards and achievements
Preceded by Jon Smyth	ECAC Hockey Best Defensive Forward; 2004–05	Succeeded by Mike Ouellette
