= ECAC Hockey Best Defensive Forward =

Annual ice hockey award

- Sport: Ice hockey
- Awarded for: The Best Defensive Forward in ECAC Hockey

History
- First award: 1993
- Most recent: Jonathan Castagna

The ECAC Hockey Best Defensive Forward is an annual award given out at the conclusion of the ECAC Hockey regular season to the best defensive forward in the conference as voted by the coaches of each ECAC team.

The Best Defensive Forward was first awarded in 1993 (the same year that the Best Defensive Defenseman award was revived) and every year thereafter. Four players (Ian Sharp, Stephen Baby, Nico Sturm, and Zach Tsekos) have received the award two separate times, all four doing so in consecutive years.

== Award winners ==
Year	Winner	Position	School
1992–93	Greg Carvel	Forward	St. Lawrence
1993–94	Ian Sharp	Forward	Princeton
1994–95	Ian Sharp	Forward	Princeton
1995–96	Brad Chartrand	Right wing	Cornell
1996–97	Joel Prpic	Center	St. Lawrence
1997–98	Buddy Wallace	Center	Clarkson
1998–99	Syl Apps III	Center	Princeton
1999–00	Doug Stienstra	Left wing	Cornell
2000–01	Mike Gellard	Right wing	St. Lawrence
2001–02	Stephen Baby	Right wing	Cornell
2002–03	Stephen Baby	Right wing	Cornell
2003–04	Jon Smyth	Left wing	Colgate
2004–05	Tom Cavanagh	Center	Harvard
2005–06	Mike Ouellette	Center	Dartmouth
2006–07	Kyle Rank	Right wing	St. Lawrence
2007–08	Nick Dodge	Right wing	Clarkson
2008–09	Tyler Mugford	Left wing	Cornell

Year	Winner	Position	School
2009–10	Travis Vermeulen	Forward	St. Lawrence
2010–11	Adam Presiznuik	Center	Union
2011–12	Kelly Zajac	Center	Union
2012–13	Greg Miller	Center	Cornell
2013–14	Jesse Root	Center	Yale
2014–15	Cole Bardreau	Forward	Cornell
2015–16	Carson Cooper	Forward	Yale
2016–17	Jake Weidner	Forward	Cornell
2017–18	Nico Sturm	Center	Clarkson
2018–19	Nico Sturm	Center	Clarkson
2019–20	Josh Dunne	Forward	Clarkson
2020–21	Zach Tsekos	Center	Clarkson
2021–22	Zach Tsekos	Center	Clarkson
2022–23	Skyler Brind’Amour	Center	Quinnipiac
2023–24	Jacob Quillan	Center	Quinnipiac
2024–25	Jack Ricketts	Center	Quinnipiac
2025–26	Jonathan Castagna	Center	Cornell

=== Winners by school ===
School	Winners
Cornell	9
Clarkson	7
St. Lawrence	5
Princeton	3
Quinnipiac	3
Union	2
Yale	2
Colgate	1
Dartmouth	1
Harvard	1

=== Winners by position ===
Position	Winners
Center	16
Right wing	6
Left wing	3
Forward	9

== See also ==
- ECAC Hockey Awards
