= Stephen Bâby =

American ice hockey player (born 1980)

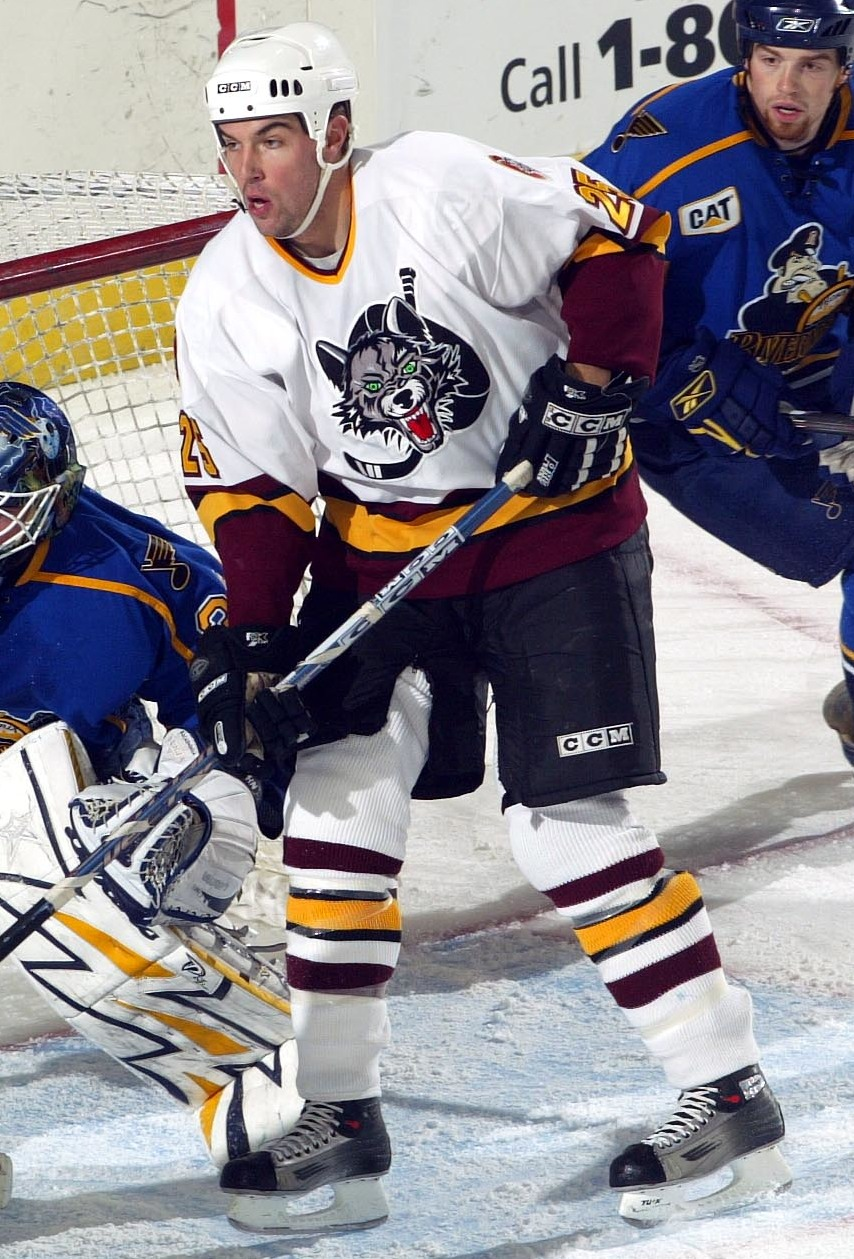
- Baby with the Chicago Wolves in 2005
- Born: January 31, 1980 (age 46) Chicago, Illinois, U.S.
- Height: 6 ft 6 in (198 cm)
- Weight: 235 lb (107 kg; 16 st 11 lb)
- Position: Right wing
- Shot: Right
- Played for: Chicago Wolves; Springfield Falcons
- NHL draft: 188th overall, 1999; Atlanta Thrashers
- Playing career: 2003–2007

Stephen Bâby (born January 31, 1980) is an American former professional ice hockey winger. He played in the AHL with the Chicago Wolves and Springfield Falcons.

== Playing career ==
Baby was drafted in the seventh round, 188th overall, by the Atlanta Thrashers in the 1999 NHL entry draft. Drafted from the United States Hockey League's Green Bay Gamblers, Baby played four seasons with Cornell University before joining the Thrashers' American Hockey League affiliate, the Chicago Wolves, in the 2003–04 season.

Baby played with the Wolves for four seasons until being traded to the Tampa Bay Lightning organization, during the 2006–07 season, and being transferred to their AHL affiliate, the Springfield Falcons.

Baby graduated from Cornell University in 2003, where he was a member of the Quill and Dagger society. While at Cornell a popular cheer for fans of the Big Red consisted of a parody of Bruce Channel's hit Hey! Baby with the lyrics changed to extol Baby's pugnacious nature on the ice. The tribute remains a common refrain in Lynah Rink to this day. The alternate lyrics sung by the fans are "Hey, Hey Bâby... I want to know .... Will you kill someone."

== Career statistics ==
			Regular season					Playoffs
Season	Team	League	GP	G	A	Pts	PIM	GP	G	A	Pts	PIM
1997–98	Green Bay Gamblers	USHL	56	17	17	34	85	4	1	3	4	8
1998–99	Green Bay Gamblers	USHL	55	23	24	47	83	6	1	1	2	4
1999–00	Cornell University	ECAC	31	4	10	14	52	—	—	—	—	—
2000–01	Cornell University	ECAC	32	8	20	28	47	—	—	—	—	—
2001–02	Cornell University	ECAC	35	9	23	32	42	—	—	—	—	—
2002–03	Cornell University	ECAC	36	8	33	41	60	—	—	—	—	—
2003–04	Chicago Wolves	AHL	68	14	12	26	72	10	1	4	5	6
2004–05	Chicago Wolves	AHL	64	6	3	9	115	6	0	0	0	12
2005–06	Chicago Wolves	AHL	39	7	15	22	44	—	—	—	—	—
2006–07	Chicago Wolves	AHL	8	1	2	3	21	—	—	—	—	—
2006–07	Springfield Falcons	AHL	23	2	1	3	24	—	—	—	—	—
AHL totals			202	30	33	63	276	16	1	4	5	18

== Awards and honors ==
Award	Year
All-ECAC Hockey Second team	2001–02
All-ECAC Hockey Second team	2002–03
AHCA East Second-Team All-American	2002–03
ECAC Hockey All-Tournament Team	2003

Awards and achievements
Preceded by Mike Gellard	ECAC Hockey Best Defensive Forward; 2001–02 / 2002–03	Succeeded by Jon Smyth
