= Mike McKenna (ice hockey) =

American ice hockey player (born 1983)

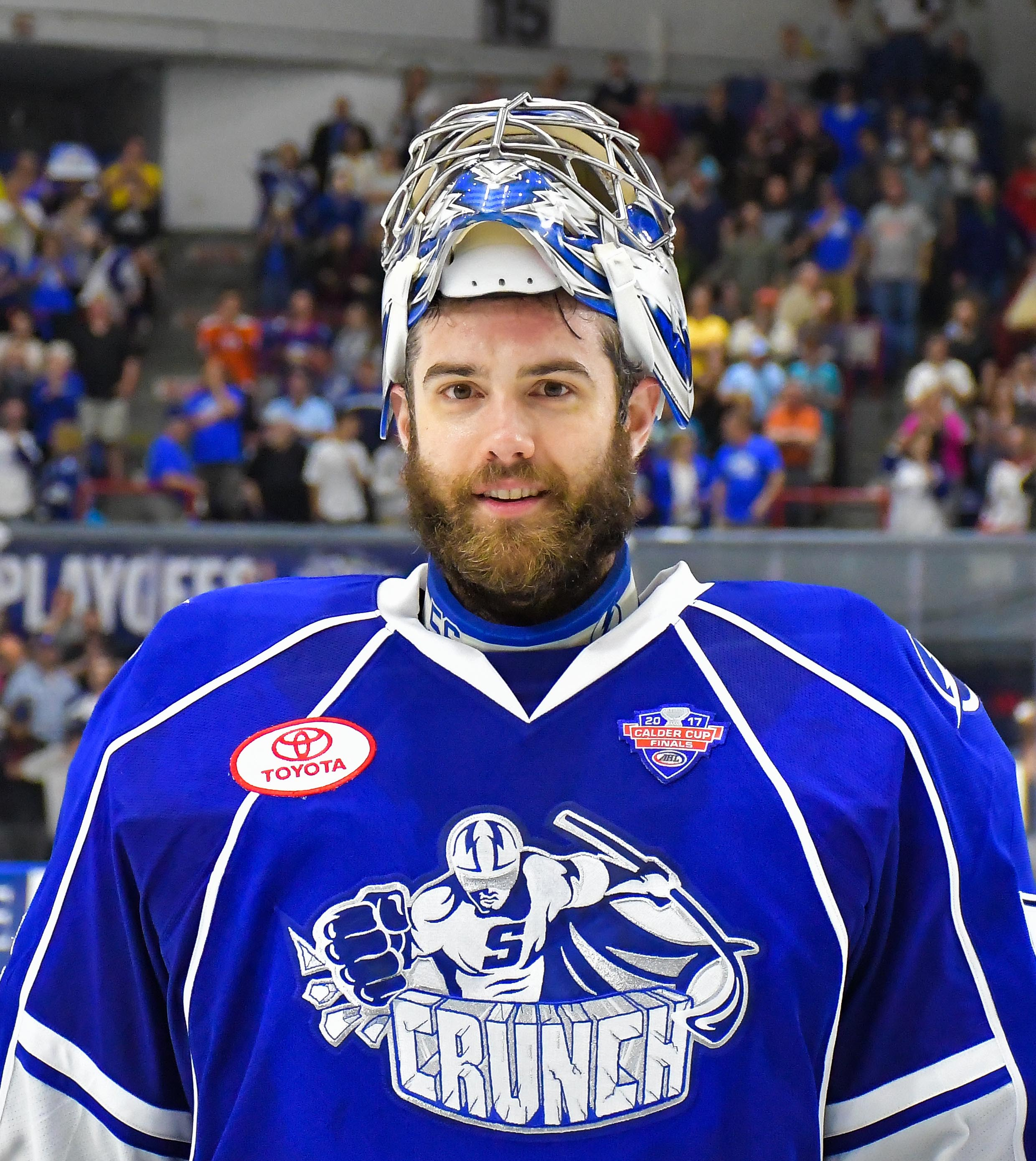
- McKenna with the Syracuse Crunch in 2017
- Born: April 11, 1983 (age 43) St. Louis, Missouri, U.S.
- Height: 6 ft 2 in (188 cm)
- Weight: 195 lb (88 kg; 13 st 13 lb)
- Position: Goaltender
- Caught: Right
- Played for: Tampa Bay Lightning; New Jersey Devils; Columbus Blue Jackets; Arizona Coyotes; Dallas Stars; Ottawa Senators; Philadelphia Flyers
- NHL draft: 172nd overall, 2002; Nashville Predators
- Playing career: 2005–2019

Mike McKenna (born April 11, 1983) is an American former professional ice hockey goaltender. McKenna was selected in the sixth round (172nd overall) of the 2002 NHL entry draft by the Nashville Predators and played in the National Hockey League (NHL) with the Tampa Bay Lightning, New Jersey Devils, Columbus Blue Jackets, Arizona Coyotes, Dallas Stars, Ottawa Senators and Philadelphia Flyers. Mckenna worked the 2022 Stanley Cup Playoffs for TNT.

== Playing career ==
=== Amateur ===
As a youth, McKenna played in the 1997 Quebec International Pee-Wee Hockey Tournament with the St. Louis Blues minor ice hockey team. He later played for the Springfield Jr. Blues in the North American Hockey League for two seasons from 1999 to 2001.

=== College ===
McKenna played his college hockey for St. Lawrence University, an NCAA Division I team in the ECAC. He played for St. Lawrence for four seasons from 2001 to 2005. He was drafted by the Nashville Predators in the sixth round of the 2002 NHL entry draft.

=== Professional ===
Beginning in 2005, McKenna played for the Las Vegas Wranglers for parts of two seasons at the beginning of his professional career. During the 2006–07 ECHL season, he compiled an impressive 27–4–2 record with five shutouts. He was named to the All-Star team and finished second in the league voting for Most Valuable Player. He played one season (2007–08) with the Portland Pirates in the American Hockey League (AHL).

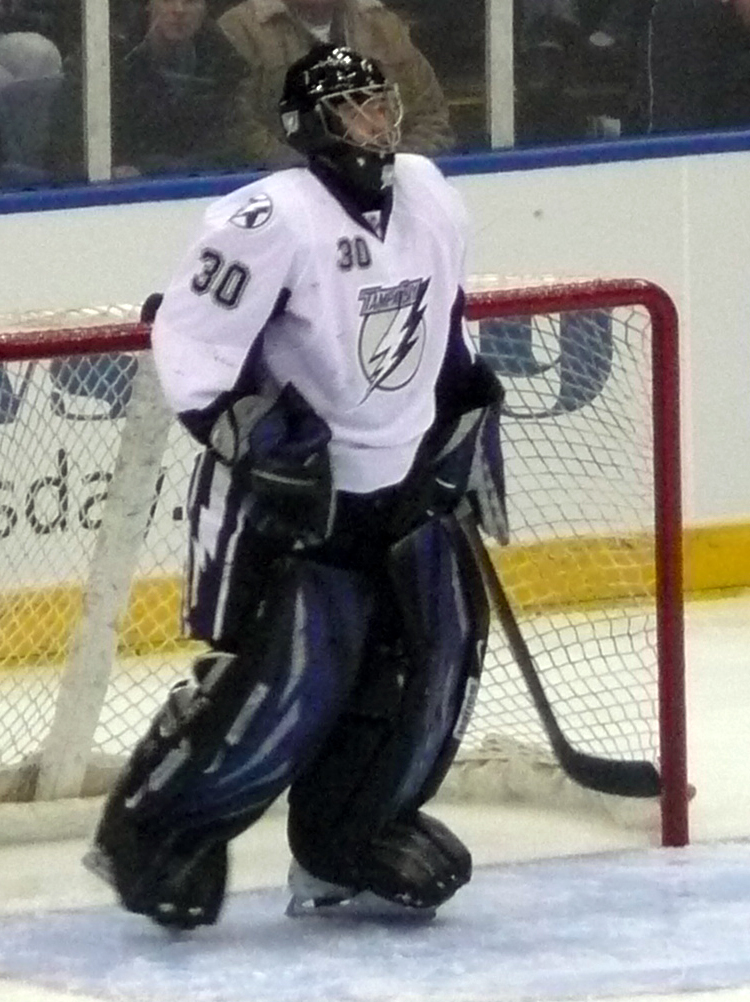
McKenna during his tenure with the Tampa Bay Lightning in 2009.

McKenna was signed to an AHL contract by the Tampa Bay Lightning's affiliate Norfolk Admirals for the 2008–09 season after drifting from several AHL teams during the previous seasons, including a previous stint for Norfolk during the 2005–06 season. He played better than expected, earning Norfolk's starting goalie position. He had an 11–10–0 record with one shutout through early February, when he was signed to an NHL contract by the Lightning after Olaf Kölzig went down for the season with an injury. He made his NHL debut on February 3, 2009, versus the New York Islanders, relieving starter Karri Rämö. The following day, he made his first NHL start in goal on February 4 against the Pittsburgh Penguins, shutting the Penguins out through two periods before losing 4–3 in overtime. McKenna earned his first NHL win and shutout on February 7 with a 28 save, 1–0 home win against the New York Islanders, less than a week into his NHL career.

In 2009, McKenna signed with the New Jersey Devils organization and played one season with the Lowell Devils. That summer the franchise was moved to Albany, NY and became the Albany Devils, where McKenna played one season. He also played two games in the NHL for New Jersey. McKenna's only NHL start of the season was against his hometown St. Louis Blues.

In July 2011, McKenna signed a one-year contract with the Ottawa Senators. He played the whole season with the Senators AHL affiliate, the Binghamton Senators.

On July 1, 2012, McKenna signed a one-year, two-way contract with the St. Louis Blues. He once again played the whole season with the AHL affiliate (Peoria Rivermen).

For a third consecutive season, McKenna continued his journeyman career and signed a one-year, two-way contract with the Columbus Blue Jackets on July 5, 2013. He started the season in their AHL affiliate the Springfield Falcons but was recalled by the Blue Jackets on December 3, 2013, after Sergei Bobrovsky went down with an injury. On December 12, 2013, McKenna made his Blue Jackets debut in relief of an injured Curtis McElhinney, saving 17 of 18 shots faced in a 4–2 win against the New York Rangers.

On July 1, 2014, McKenna signed a one-year, two-way contract with the Arizona Coyotes. He started the season with the AHL affiliate, the Portland Pirates, whom he had previously played for. In the 2014–15 season, after the trading away of Arizona goaltender Devan Dubnyk, McKenna was recalled to the NHL again where he started one game for the Coyotes.

With the Coyotes changing AHL affiliates to Springfield, MA, McKenna was signed to a one-year, two-way contract with the new Portland Pirates' parent club, the Florida Panthers, on July 1, 2015. He spent the majority of the season with the Pirates, save for a two-game recall beginning on February 29, 2016 and ending March 4.

McKenna began the 2016–17 season with the Springfield Thunderbirds (formerly the Portland Pirates). On March 1, 2017, he returned to the Tampa Bay Lightning organization after he was traded by the Panthers in exchange for fellow goaltender Adam Wilcox. Assuming the starting role with AHL affiliate the Syracuse Crunch, McKenna's veteran experience helped the Crunch to advance to the Calder Cup Finals. He recorded a career high 13 playoff wins, and is tied for the Crunch franchise single playoff win record with Cedrick Desjardins with 13.

On July 1, 2017, McKenna signed a one-year, two-way contract with the Dallas Stars. In the 2017–18 season, McKenna spent the majority of the season with the Stars AHL affiliate in Texas, helping them reach the Calder Cup finals, his second successive appearance. He was recalled by Dallas for the last month and a half of the regular season, appearing in two NHL contests and earning his first win since 2014.

As a free agent in the off-season, McKenna extended his career in agreeing to a one-year, two-way contract with the Ottawa Senators on July 1, 2018. He joined AHL affiliate, the Belleville Senators to begin the 2018–19 season. After six games with Belleville, McKenna was recalled by Ottawa. He appeared in 10 games with the Senators, posting 1-4-1 record before he was traded along with Tom Pyatt and a 2019 sixth round draft pick to the Vancouver Canucks in exchange for Anders Nilsson and Darren Archibald on January 2, 2019. He was waived after backing up Jacob Markström for two games, with the Canucks' intention being to reassign him to their AHL affiliate, the Utica Comets. He was promptly claimed on waivers by the Philadelphia Flyers as they dealt with injuries to goaltenders Brian Elliott, Michal Neuvirth, and Anthony Stolarz. McKenna made his Flyers debut on January 8, 2019 against the Washington Capitals. He was the seventh goaltender to start for the Flyers in the 2018–19 season in only the 43rd game. On January 30, 2019, McKenna agreed to a 14-day conditioning loan with the Lehigh Valley Phantoms. He went 2-1 during the stint while playing for an AHL-record thirteenth franchise.

On February 20, 2019, McKenna was waived by the Flyers.

On August 27, 2019, McKenna announced his retirement from professional hockey. Following his retirement, he was hired as a TV analyst for the Vegas Golden Knights.

== Career statistics ==
=== Regular season and playoffs ===
			Regular season										Playoffs
Season	Team	League	GP	W	L	T	OTL	MIN	GA	SO	GAA	SV%	GP	W	L	MIN	GA	SO	GAA	SV%
1999–00	Springfield Jr. Blues	NAHL	16	6	7	1	—	879	48	0	3.28	.867	—	—	—	—	—	—	—	—
2000–01	Springfield Jr. Blues	NAHL	48	18	27	0	—	2743	209	1	4.57	.884	—	—	—	—	—	—	—	—
2001–02	St. Lawrence University	ECAC	20	7	10	1	—	1122	59	0	3.16	.898	—	—	—	—	—	—	—	—
2002–03	St. Lawrence University	ECAC	13	1	7	2	—	618	38	0	3.69	.897	—	—	—	—	—	—	—	—
2003–04	St. Lawrence University	ECAC	27	9	10	3	—	1475	60	3	2.44	.917	—	—	—	—	—	—	—	—
2004–05	St. Lawrence University	ECAC	35	15	17	2	—	2022	92	3	2.73	.908	—	—	—	—	—	—	—	—
2005–06	Las Vegas Wranglers	ECHL	25	19	2	—	1	1383	49	1	2.13	.923	4	1	1	173	9	0	3.12	.905
2005–06	Norfolk Admirals	AHL	7	4	2	—	1	388	25	0	3.86	.883	—	—	—	—	—	—	—	—
2006–07	Las Vegas Wranglers	ECHL	38	27	4	—	7	2258	83	5	2.21	.927	6	3	3	358	15	0	2.51	.913
2006–07	Milwaukee Admirals	AHL	1	0	0	—	0	11	3	0	15.72	.250	—	—	—	—	—	—	—	—
2006–07	Omaha Ak-Sar-Ben Knights	AHL	2	0	1	—	0	96	6	0	3.74	.889	—	—	—	—	—	—	—	—
2007–08	Portland Pirates	AHL	41	24	13	—	1	2269	103	3	2.72	.908	6	2	4	320	18	0	3.38	.886
2008–09	Norfolk Admirals	AHL	24	11	10	—	1	1315	65	1	2.97	.904	—	—	—	—	—	—	—	—
2008–09	Tampa Bay Lightning	NHL	15	4	8	—	1	776	46	1	3.56	.887	—	—	—	—	—	—	—	—
2009–10	Lowell Devils	AHL	50	24	17	—	6	2891	119	3	2.47	.921	5	1	4	317	17	0	3.22	.902
2010–11	Albany Devils	AHL	39	14	20	—	2	2062	124	1	3.61	.886	—	—	—	—	—	—	—	—
2010–11	New Jersey Devils	NHL	2	0	1	—	0	118	6	0	3.05	.893	—	—	—	—	—	—	—	—
2011–12	Binghamton Senators	AHL	41	14	22	—	1	2196	109	0	2.98	.918	—	—	—	—	—	—	—	—
2012–13	Peoria Rivermen	AHL	39	19	18	—	1	2307	93	4	2.42	.923	—	—	—	—	—	—	—	—
2013–14	Springfield Falcons	AHL	36	22	10	—	1	2106	89	3	2.54	.910	5	2	2	245	14	0	3.43	.907
2013–14	Columbus Blue Jackets	NHL	4	1	1	—	1	219	11	0	3.01	.904	—	—	—	—	—	—	—	—
2014–15	Portland Pirates	AHL	52	27	18	—	6	2979	111	7	2.24	.926	2	0	1	41	6	0	8.89	.647
2014–15	Arizona Coyotes	NHL	1	0	1	—	0	60	5	0	5.00	.853	—	—	—	—	—	—	—	—
2015–16	Portland Pirates	AHL	57	33	17	—	5	3256	133	3	2.45	.921	5	2	3	338	12	0	2.13	.918
2016–17	Springfield Thunderbirds	AHL	26	9	10	—	7	1550	73	1	2.83	.907	—	—	—	—	—	—	—	—
2016–17	Syracuse Crunch	AHL	14	5	5	—	3	796	38	0	2.87	.901	22	13	9	1341	60	0	2.68	.911
2017–18	Texas Stars	AHL	32	17	9	—	4	1861	82	1	2.64	.909	22	14	8	1371	55	2	2.41	.927
2017–18	Dallas Stars	NHL	2	1	1	—	0	102	5	0	2.97	.900	—	—	—	—	—	—	—	—
2018–19	Belleville Senators	AHL	6	3	3	—	0	353	16	0	2.72	.914	—	—	—	—	—	—	—	—
2018–19	Ottawa Senators	NHL	10	1	4	—	1	455	30	0	3.96	.897	—	—	—	—	—	—	—	—
2018–19	Philadelphia Flyers	NHL	1	0	1	—	0	57	4	0	4.21	.833	—	—	—	—	—	—	—	—
2018–19	Lehigh Valley Phantoms	AHL	10	5	4	—	0	565	34	0	3.61	.896	—	—	—	—	—	—	—	—
AHL totals			477	231	179	—	39	27,001	1,223	27	2.72	.912	67	34	31	3,973	182	2	2.75	.912
NHL totals			35	7	17	—	3	1,785	107	1	3.60	.890	—	—	—	—	—	—	—	—
