= Mac Faulkner =

Canadian ice hockey player

- Born: May 20, 1983 (age 42) King City, Ontario, Canada
- Height: 6 ft 1 in (185 cm)
- Weight: 203 lb (92 kg; 14 st 7 lb)
- Position: Centre
- Shot: Left
- Played for: Binghamton Senators; Long Beach Ice Dogs; Columbia Inferno; Toronto Marlies; Reading Royals; Norfolk Admirals; Cincinnati Cyclones; Alleghe Hockey; Ritten Sport; Cardiff Devils
- Playing career: 2005–2014

Mac Faulkner (born May 20, 1983) is a Canadian former professional ice hockey centre and a partner at McKinsey & Company He is the coach of the U11A Leaside Wildcats for the 2024-2025 season.

== Career ==
Faulkner played the majority of his professional career in the ECHL, playing for the Long Beach Ice Dogs, Columbia Inferno, Reading Royals and Cincinnati Cyclones. He also played nine games in the American Hockey League, five for the Binghamton Senators, three for the Toronto Marlies and one for the Norfolk Admirals.

In 2009, Faulkner moved to Europe and signed for Italian Serie A team HC Alleghe. After two seasons with Alleghe he moved to fellow Serie A team Ritten Sport. In 2012, Faulkner signed for the Cardiff Devils in the Elite Ice Hockey League in the United Kingdom where he scored 30 goals in just 38 games and was named in the EIHL's First All-Star Team. He re-signed for a second season with the Devils where he became their captain. He racked up 32 goals and 31 assists for 63 points in 52 games and was named in the EIHL's Second All-Star Team. Faulkner departed from the Devils afterwards and soon retired from professional hockey.

Following Faulkner's departure from professional hockey, he joined the management consulting firm McKinsey & Company in Toronto where he is currently a partner.

== Awards and honours ==
Award	Year
EIHL First All-Star team	2012–13
