= Brady Leisenring =

American ice hockey player

- Born: September 7, 1982 (age 43) Stowe, Vermont, U.S.
- Height: 5 ft 11 in (180 cm)
- Weight: 190 lb (86 kg; 13 st 8 lb)
- Position: Forward
- Shot: Right
- Played for: Cleveland Barons; Worcester Sharks; Fresno Falcons; Schwenningen ERC; Landshut Cannibals; Hannover Indians; Odessa Jackalopes; Bridgeport Sound Tigers; Kalamazoo Wings; ESV Kaufbeuren; VIK Västerås HK; Heilbronner Falken; Esbjerg Energy
- National team: United States
- Playing career: 2006–2014

Brady Leisenring (born September 7, 1982) is an American former professional ice hockey player current assistant coach with the Atlanta Gladiators of the ECHL.

== Playing career ==
Leisenring was a standout hockey player for the University of Vermont Catamounts from 2001 to 2006. In his final season at UVM he broke John LeClair's all-time record of most points by a Vermont born player with 117. After the end of the 2005–06 season at UVM, he signed an amateur try-out contract with the Cleveland Barons of the American Hockey League. The next season following his 3-game stint in the AHL Leisenring participated with the San Jose Sharks' prospects in what was called “Pacific Division Shootout”, featuring rookies from the Los Angeles Kings, Anaheim Ducks and Phoenix Coyotes. San Jose would send him to their minor league affiliate the Worcester Sharks. Leisenring would play 27 games for Worcester over the next two season. After several stops he then joined the Hannover Indians in the German 2.GBun for the 2009–10 season.

After spending the 2010–11 season in North America with namely the Kalamazoo Wings and Bridgeport Sound Tigers, Leisenring returned to Germany signing a one-year contract with ESV Kaufbeuren of the 2nd Bundeliga on June 7, 2011. He next headed to Sweden and spent two seasons with VIK Västerås HK, along with a stint with Heilbronner Falken in Germany.

== Coaching career ==
In 2014, Leisenring signed on with the Esbjerg Energy of the Danish Metal Ligaen. After appearing in 16 games, Leisenring retired and took an assistant coaching position with the team. In 2017, Leisenring returned stateside and was named an assistant coach of the Atlanta Gladiators in the ECHL.

== Career statistics ==
=== Regular season and playoffs ===
			Regular season					Playoffs
Season	Team	League	GP	G	A	Pts	PIM	GP	G	A	Pts	PIM
1998–99	U.S. National Development Team	NAHL	54	16	11	27	35	—	—	—	—	—
1999-00	U.S. National Development Team	USDP	53	11	9	20	34	—	—	—	—	—
2000–01	U.S. National Development Team	USDP	37	16	12	28	51	—	—	—	—	—
2001–02	University of Vermont	ECAC	31	5	5	10	12	—	—	—	—	—
2002–03	University of Vermont	ECAC	36	12	15	27	14	—	—	—	—	—
2003–04	University of Vermont	ECAC	35	15	21	36	38	—	—	—	—	—
2004–05	University of Vermont	ECAC	6	3	6	9	6	—	—	—	—	—
2005–06	University of Vermont	HE	37	11	24	35	16	—	—	—	—	—
2005–06	Cleveland Barons	AHL	3	1	0	1	0	—	—	—	—	—
2006–07	Fresno Falcons	ECHL	42	11	16	27	30	4	1	2	3	0
2006–07	Worcester Sharks	AHL	24	2	3	5	12	—	—	—	—	—
2007–08	Fresno Falcons	ECHL	64	25	35	60	58	6	2	4	6	6
2007–08	Worcester Sharks	AHL	3	0	0	0	2	—	—	—	—	—
2008–09	Schwenningen ERC	2.GBun	48	28	26	54	44	2	0	1	1	0
2009–10	Landshut Cannibals	2.GBun	28	5	10	15	20	—	—	—	—	—
2009–10	Hannover Indians	2.GBun	22	7	14	21	24	—	—	—	—	—
2010–11	Odessa Jackalopes	CHL	4	1	1	2	4	—	—	—	—	—
2010–11	Kalamazoo Wings	ECHL	38	8	15	23	31	10	1	1	2	2
2010–11	Bridgeport Sound Tigers	AHL	14	0	2	2	6	—	—	—	—	—
2011-12	ESV Kaufbeuren	2.GBun	48	33	23	56	76	6	3	2	5	2
2012-13	VIK Västerås HK	HockeyAllsvenskan	43	13	13	26	10	2	0	1	1	0
2013-14	Heilbronner Falken	DEL2	35	7	13	20	10	7	0	3	3	0
2014-15	Esbjerg Energy	Metal Ligaen	16	2	6	8	0	-	-	-	-	-
Career Totals			721	232	267	499	533	37	7	14	21	10

=== International ===
Year	Team	Comp	GP	G	A	Pts	PIM
2000	United States	WJC18	6	1	2	3	8
Junior int'l totals			6	1	2	3	8

== Awards and honors ==
Award	Year
All-ECAC Hockey First Team	2003–04
