= Mike Ouellette =

Canadian ice hockey player (born 1982)

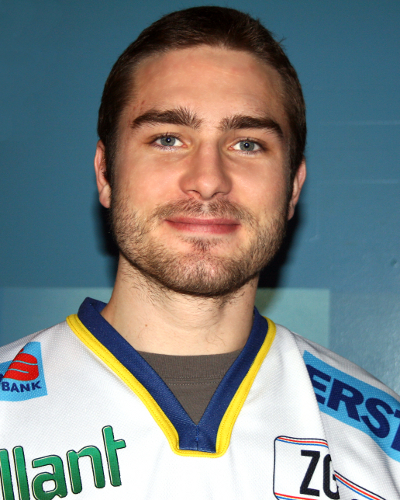
- Born: July 6, 1982 (age 44) Kamloops, British Columbia, Canada
- Height: 6 ft 1 in (185 cm)
- Weight: 185 lb (84 kg; 13 st 3 lb)
- Position: Center
- Shot: Right
- Played for: Springfield Falcons; Charlotte Checkers; Hartford Wolf Pack; KHL Medveščak Zagreb; Graz99ers; Steinbach Black Wings 1992; Vienna Capitals
- Playing career: 2002–2015

Michael Ouellette is a Canadian former ice hockey center who was an All-American for Dartmouth.

== Career ==
Ouellette's college career began in 2002 and he was an instant hit for the Dartmouth hockey team. Ouellette scored just over a point per game as a freshman and helped the Big Green win 20 games for the first time in 54 years. He was named as an alternate captain for his sophomore season but both he and the team declined. Both rebounded in 2005 and Ouellette led the team to another 20-win season. He was named team captain for his senior season and he led Dartmouth to its first ECAC Hockey title. The Big Green had been playing in the conference since 1961 and had never finished higher than third in the standings. The team had a chance to end their 26-year NCAA Tournament drought but a loss to Harvard in the semifinals resulted in their being dropped from the top-15 rankings. For his final season, Ouellette was named as an All-American as well as the top defensive forward in the conference while also leading Dartmouth in scoring.

The following season, Ouellette became a full-time professional player and performed well with the Charlotte Checkers. He played most of the next two seasons with the Hartford Wolf Pack, providing depth scoring. In 2009 he headed to Europe and played six seasons in the Erste Bank Eishockey Liga. He bounced around at first, despite scoring at least 20 goals in each of his first five seasons, but ended up joining Black Wings Linz at the right time. He was second on the Wings in postseason scoring as the team won the Austrian Championship in 2012.

Ouellette retired as a player in 2015 and moved to Hawaii where he earned a real estate license. Before the end of the year, he moved to Los Angeles and joined the Klabin Company. Since then he's become Vice President of the business and continued to work in that field.

== Career statistics ==
=== Regular season and playoffs ===
			Regular season					Playoffs
Season	Team	League	GP	G	A	Pts	PIM	GP	G	A	Pts	PIM
1999–00	North Kamloops Lions U18 AAA	U18 AAA	63	57	76	133	28	—	—	—	—	—
2000–01	Merritt Centennials	BCHL	58	34	29	63	10	15	6	7	13	6
2001–02	Merritt Centennials	BCHL	49	32	41	73	35	4	0	1	1	4
2002–03	Dartmouth	ECAC Hockey	34	14	21	35	12	—	—	—	—	—
2003–04	Dartmouth	ECAC Hockey	34	16	9	25	42	—	—	—	—	—
2004–05	Dartmouth	ECAC Hockey	35	15	26	41	16	—	—	—	—	—
2005–06	Dartmouth	ECAC Hockey	33	13	24	37	26	—	—	—	—	—
2005–06	Toronto Marlies	AHL	3	0	1	1	0	—	—	—	—	—
2006–07	Charlotte Checkers	ECHL	69	17	30	47	27	5	0	0	0	0
2007–08	Charlotte Checkers	ECHL	6	3	2	5	4	—	—	—	—	—
2007–08	Hartford Wolf Pack	AHL	69	13	13	26	16	5	1	2	3	0
2008–09	Hartford Wolf Pack	AHL	77	15	16	31	24	6	1	2	3	4
2009–10	Medveščak Zagreb	EBEL	52	24	24	48	30	11	7	3	10	8
2010–11	Graz99ers	EBEL	54	24	31	55	22	4	1	1	2	8
2011–12	Black Wings Linz	EBEL	49	20	34	54	10	17	5	13	18	10
2012–13	Black Wings Linz	EBEL	52	22	32	54	10	13	4	4	8	2
2013–14	Vienna Capitals	EBEL	30	20	18	38	39	5	1	2	3	6
2014–15	Black Wings Linz	EBEL	39	7	13	20	14	12	2	6	8	2
BCHL totals			107	66	70	136	45	19	6	8	14	10
NCAA totals			136	58	80	138	96	—	—	—	—	—
ECHL totals			75	20	32	52	31	5	0	0	0	0
AHL totals			149	28	30	58	40	11	2	4	6	4
EBEL totals			296	117	152	269	125	62	20	29	49	36

== Awards and honors ==
Award	Year
All-ECAC Hockey First Team	2005–06
AHCA East Second-Team All-American	2005–06

Awards and achievements
Preceded by Tom Cavanagh	ECAC Hockey Best Defensive Forward; 2005–06	Succeeded by Kyle Rank
