= Brent Robinson =

British academic

- Born: Charles Brent Robinson; 19 May 1951; Winchester, England.
- Died: 14 September 1996 (aged 45); Channel Ferry
- Occupation: English Lecturer at Cambridge University.
- Years active: 1980–1996
- Known for: Author, and University Lecturer. Researcher in Information Technology and Teacher Education.
- Notable work: Microcomputers and the Language of Arts (English, Language and Education
- Spouse: Suzanne D Cowling (divorced)

Dr. Brent Robinson (born Charles Brent Robinson, 1951–1996),) was a lecturer at the University of Cambridge and author. He was a Fellow of Hughes Hall, Cambridge, and wrote books such as Microcomputers and the Language of Arts (English, Language and Education), and works relating to information technology use by teachers. He created the Journal of Information Technology For Teacher education, in which he was also a researcher. His major interests were in teacher education, and he was formerly Vice President of the Society for Information Technology and Teacher Education.

His family had a tradition: every male in the family were to be named Charles, as a first name. Brent Robinson, however, preferred to be referred to by his middle name. He produced a number of notable works, such as Education Technology: Leadership Perspective.

Front cover of the above publication.

== Literary research ==
Literary personification was a key research focus for Dr Robinson. He hired a professional writer to play a character who featured in a novel, and then encouraged eighth grade students to write to this character with questions and comments. This however, was done via email communication. Brent was featured in a Cambridge University publication surrounding IT usage in the classroom, when information technology was just coming into fruition.

== Personal life ==
Brent was born in Winchester in 1951. He had a daughter named Charlotte. He married Suzanne D Cowling in 1982, however at a later unknown date, he divorced her.

== Death ==
Robinson died on a Channel ferry on 14 September 1996, according to his family. He was 45.
