= 2008–09 Boston University Terriers men's ice hockey season =

NCAA Division I National Champion Ice Breaker, Champion Denver Cup, Champion Beanpot, Champion Hockey East, Champion Hockey East Tournament, Champion NCAA tournament, Champion
- Conference: 1st Hockey East
- Home ice: Agganis Arena

Rankings
- USCHO.com: 1
- USA Today: 1

Record
- Overall: 35–6–4
- Conference: 18–5–4
- Home: 14–4–2
- Road: 12–2–2
- Neutral: 9–0–0

Coaches and captains
- Head coach: Jack Parker
- Assistant coaches: David Quinn; Mike Bavis; Mike Geragosian
- Captain(s): Matt Gilroy; John McCarthy
- Alternate captain: Brian Strait

The 2008–09 Boston University Terriers Men's ice hockey season was the 81st season of play for the program and 25th in Hockey East. They represented Boston University in the 2008–09 NCAA Division I men's ice hockey season. The Terriers were coached by Jack Parker, in his 36th season, and played their home games at Agganis Arena. The team won the 2009 NCAA Division I men's ice hockey tournament, the 5th national championship in program history.

== Season ==
Entering the year, Boston University had been a program in limbo for several years. While Jack Parker had no trouble recruiting talented players for the Terriers (nearly half of the roster was made up of NHL-drafted players), that hadn't translated into many victories for BU. Over the previous four years, the Terriers had good finishes in the regular season but had squandered several tournament appearance by losing 3 of their last 4 postseason games.

This year, the team's fortunes would hinge on the performance of two freshmen goaltenders, Kieran Millan and Grant Rollheiser, who would vie to take over the starting from the less-than stellar Brett Bennett. At the beginning of the year, the two netminders shared the crease and both played well over the first few weeks of the campaign. By late-November, however, Millan had established himself as the better of the two and would remain a fixture in goal for the rest of the season. Rollheiser got some playing time and did look very capable when he was in the cage, but Millan put up one of the most stellar freshman performances in the history of the NCAA.

BU's goaltenders were insulated by a star-studded cast of defensemen, many of whom would reach the highest level of the game, including Eric Gryba, Brian Strait and Kevin Shattenkirk. It was, however, Matt Gilroy, the team's senior co-Captain who led the defensive corps. While Gilroy led the club in points from the blueline, he was also a standout by wearing the number 97. Jack Parker typically did not allow his players to wear any number above 39, however, Gilroy was a special case. Growing up, Matt and his younger brother Timmy wore numbers 98 and 97 respectively in honor of Wayne Gretzky. That changed when Timmy died in a bicycle accident at the age of 8. Afterwards, Matt Gilroy wore his brother's number and when he told Parker his reasons why, the old-school BU coach made an exception for Gilroy.

The Terriers had a strong roster that season. Led by a 7th overall pick, Colin Wilson, the team recorded one of the highest-scoring offenses in the nation. Boston University had 17 players reach double-digit points and averaged just under four goals per game.

=== Early season gauntlet ===
From the beginning of their campaign, the Terriers faced a difficult test. In their first eleven games, nine came against ranked teams. Despite the tall task, BU shot out to a 6–1 record and were ranked #1 just a month into the season. The team hit a bit of a rough patch in mid-November and lost three of four games. They dropped down to #8 in the polls but jumped back into the top 5 when they took a weekend series from arch-rival and then-#2 Boston College.

=== Piling up wins ===
After returning from the winter break, BU kicked off the second half of their season by winning the Denver Cup. After a poor performance against conference bottom-feeder Providence ten days later, BU went on a long streak and didn't lose another game for the rest of the regular season. The Terriers went 13–0–3 down the stretch and trounced most of their opponents. During their run, they also captured the Beanpot title, dropping #3 Northeastern in the process. By not losing, BU was able to rise up to #1 in the polls and finish atop the Hockey East standings by a single point.

=== Conference tournament ===
Despite being the prohibitive favorite for the NCAA title, BU faced tough challenge from 8th-seeded Maine in the quarterfinals. After eking out a narrow victory in game 1, the Terriers played one of their worst games of the year in the rematch and lost for the first time in over two months. Millan's 6 goals against was by far a season high and put the Terriers on the precipice of getting knocked out of the Hockey East tournament. The shocking loss appeared to wake up the team and they came storming back in the deciding game 3, scoring 6 goals in the first two periods and sailing to an easy victory.

The semifinal pitted BU against BC once more and, at least early-on, it appeared that the Eagles may finally have figured out how to defeat this year's team. The Terriers were held scoreless over the first 50 minutes of the game and were held in check by a stingy Boston College defense. In the second half of the third, BU's offense exploded for 3 goals in 44 seconds and took a 3–1 lead over the stunned BC squad. The Eagles were able to cut into the lead with a second goal just after a BU penalty had expired but Millan held the fort for the rest of the game and allowed the Terriers to escape with a win.

The championship game turned into a goaltending duel between Millan and Massachusetts–Lowell's Nevin Hamilton. It took almost all of the first period for Brandon Yip to net the Terriers' first marker but that was all BU could get past the River Hawk goalie. Fortunately, Millan stood on his head all game long and turned aside all 32 shots to earn a 1–0 shutout and the 31st victory on the year for the Terriers.

=== NCAA tournament ===
BU was given the #1 overall seed for the NCAA tournament, which was typically the kiss-of-death for a team's championship hopes. Since 1996, only Wisconsin in 2006 had won a championship as the top overall seed. While history may have been against them, The Terriers were able to open against a relatively weak Ohio State team and complete dominate the Buckeyes. BU scored the first six goals of the game and were able to relax in the second half, cruising to an 8–3 victory. They received goals from six different players but it was Matt Gilroy who led the way with 4 assists.

The Terriers' road grew much more difficult after the opening round breeze and they got a fight from conference-rival New Hampshire. The Wildcats limited BU to just 23 shots on the night but that didn't stop Corey Trivino from opening the scoring. UNH took over the second period and even the score but, uncharacteristically, it was the Wildcats that got into penalty trouble in the third. Jason Lawrence scored his 24th goal of the year on BU's second power play of the frame with just 15 seconds remaining in regulation to give the Terriers the win and send them to the Frozen Four for the first time in twelve years.

In the national semifinal against another conference rival, Vermont, BU got off to a tremendous start; they outshot the Catamounts 2:1 and led 2–0 after 20 minutes. While it appeared that the Terriers were on their way to another easy win, Vermont came charging back in the second, scoring three consecutive goals in a 6-minute span to take the lead. Vinny Saponari netter a power play goal just before the end of the period to tie the game. The Catamounts retook the lead mid-way through the third on their second power play goal of the game but Chris Higgins became the hero a few minutes later. He scored his 14th of the year on a rush to tie the game and then had Wilson score off of his rebound to put the Terriers ahead for good.

After the wild semifinal, only Miami remained and Boston University met the RedHawks for the championship. Chris Connolly opened the scoring in the first, however, true to form, the Terriers were hampered by having to kill 7 penalties during the game. While Miami wasn't able to score on any of the man-advantages, they were able to keep the Terriers hemmed in their zone for much of the time. The limited offensive opportunities enabled the RedHawks to tie the game in the second and then take a lead in the second half of the third. A third Miami goal with just over 4 minutes remaining in the match appeared to be the final nail in the coffin for BU. After calling a timeout, Parker pulled Kieran Millan with 3:32 remaining. Due to the tough defensing from Miami, it took a while for BU to establish themselves in the offensive zone but eventually they were able to leaky goal from a Zach Cohen backhander. With approximately one minute left, BU needed another goal to tie and the team appeared to be far more energetic. The Terriers were able to get into the Miami end fairly easily and passed the puck around with aplomb. Eventually the rubber made its way through a sea of lumber and legs to the stick of Nick Bonino who fired it into a half-open cage to tie the score with just 17 seconds remaining. The team's momentum carried over into the overtime where BU outshot Miami 9–4. About halfway through the extra period, Colby Cohen fired a shot from the blueline but it was blocked by Kevin Roeder. The puck deflected off of Roeder's leg up into the air, causing Miami's goaltender Cody Reichard to lose track of the shot. The puck arched like a rainbow right over Reichard's shoulder and into the net, giving BU its 5th national championship and one of the more improbable comebacks in the history of all sports, let alone college hockey.

== Departures ==
Player	Position	Nationality	Cause
Brett Bennett	Goaltender	United States	Returned to juniors (Indiana Ice); transferred to Wisconsin
Bryan Ewing	Forward	United States	Graduation (signed with Wheeling Nailers)
Karson Gillespie	Goaltender	Canada	Graduation (retired)
Kevin Kielt	Defenseman	United States	Graduation (retired)
Peter MacArthur	Forward	United States	Graduation (signed with Bridgeport Sound Tigers)
Dan McGoff	Defenseman	United States	Graduation (signed with Trenton Devils)
Brian McGuirk	Forward	United States	Graduation (signed with Columbus Blue Jackets)
Ryan Monaghan	Forward	United States	Graduation (retired)
Craig Sanders	Forward	United States	Signed professional contract (Amsterdam Tigers)
Ryan Weston	Forward	United States	Graduation (signed with Albany River Rats)

== Recruiting ==
Player	Position	Nationality	Age	Notes
Chris Connolly	Forward	United States	21	Duluth, MN
Kevin Gilroy	Forward	United States	21	North Bellmore, NY
Andrew Glass	Forward	United States	19	Wrentham, MA
Kieran Millan	Goaltender	Canada	19	Edmonton, AB
Grant Rollheiser	Goaltender	Canada	19	Chilliwack, BC; selected 158th overall in 2008
Ryan Ruikka	Defenseman	United States	20	Chelsea, MI; red shirt
Vinny Saponari	Forward	United States	18	Powder Springs, GA; selected 94th overall in 2008
Corey Trivino	Forward	Canada	18	Toronto, ON; selected 36th overall in 2008
David Warsofsky	Defenseman	United States	18	Marshfield, MA; selected 95th overall in 2008

== Roster ==
As of October 1, 2008.

No.	Nat.	Player	Class	Pos	Height	Weight	DoB	Hometown	Previous team	NHL rights
2		Eric Gryba	Sophomore	D	6' 4" (1.93 m)	223 lb (101 kg)	1988-04-14	Saskatoon, Saskatchewan	Green Bay Gamblers (USHL)	OTT, 68th overall 2006
3		Kevin Shattenkirk	Sophomore	D	6' 0" (1.83 m)	207 lb (94 kg)	1989-01-29	New Rochelle, New York	USNTDP (USHL)	ANA, 14th overall 2007
4		Ryan Ruikka	Freshman (RS)	D	6' 0" (1.83 m)	201 lb (91 kg)	1988-03-31	Chelsea, Michigan	New Jersey Hitmen (EJHL)	—
5		David Warsofsky	Freshman	D	5' 9" (1.75 m)	170 lb (77 kg)	1990-05-30	Marshfield, Massachusetts	USNTDP (USHL)	STL, 95th overall 2008
6		Joe Pereira	Sophomore	F	5' 10" (1.78 m)	179 lb (81 kg)	1987-03-28	West Haven, Connecticut	South Kent Prep (USHS-Prep)	—
7		Brian Strait (A)	Junior	D	6' 1" (1.85 m)	205 lb (93 kg)	1988-01-04	Waltham, Massachusetts	USNTDP (USHL)	PIT, 65th overall 2006
8		Steve Smolinsky	Senior	F	5' 10" (1.78 m)	168 lb (76 kg)	1986-05-22	Plymouth, Massachusetts	Salisbury School (USHS-Prep)	—
9		Corey Trivino	Freshman	F	6' 1" (1.85 m)	190 lb (86 kg)	1990-01-12	Toronto, Ontario	Stouffville Spirit (OPJHL)	NYI, 36th overall 2008
10		Chris Higgins	Senior	F	5' 11" (1.8 m)	185 lb (84 kg)	1986-04-30	Lynnfield, Massachusetts	New Hampshire Junior Monarchs (EJHL)	—
11		Zach Cohen	Junior	F	6' 3" (1.91 m)	192 lb (87 kg)	1987-02-06	Schaumburg, Illinois	Tri-City Storm (USHL)	—
12		Chris Connolly	Freshman	F	5' 9" (1.75 m)	157 lb (71 kg)	1987-07-23	Duluth, Minnesota	Omaha Lancers (USHL)	—
13		Nick Bonino	Sophomore	F	6' 1" (1.85 m)	194 lb (88 kg)	1988-04-20	Hartford, Connecticut	Avon Old Farms School (USHS-Prep)	SJS, 173rd overall 2007
14		Andrew Glass	Freshman	F	5' 11" (1.8 m)	185 lb (84 kg)	1989-07-14	Wrentham, Massachusetts	Noble and Greenough School (USHS-Prep)	—
15		John McCarthy (C)	Senior	F	6' 1" (1.85 m)	194 lb (88 kg)	1986-08-09	Boston, Massachusetts	Des Moines Buccaneers (USHL)	SJS, 202nd overall 2006
16		Kevin Gilroy	Freshman	F	6' 0" (1.83 m)	194 lb (88 kg)	1987-07-08	North Bellmore, New York	South Shore Kings (EJHL)	—
17		Victor Saponari	Sophomore	F	5' 10" (1.78 m)	170 lb (77 kg)	1987-11-15	Powder Springs, Georgia	Culver Academies (USHS-Prep)	—
18		Brandon Yip	Junior	F	6' 1" (1.85 m)	196 lb (89 kg)	1985-04-25	Maple Ridge, British Columbia	Coquitlam Express (BCHL)	COL, 239th overall 2004
21		Jason Lawrence	Senior	F	5' 10" (1.78 m)	185 lb (84 kg)	1987-02-02	Saugus, Massachusetts	USNTDP (USHL)	—
25		Colby Cohen	Sophomore	D	6' 3" (1.91 m)	216 lb (98 kg)	1989-04-25	Villanova, Pennsylvania	Lincoln Stars (USHL)	COL, 45th overall 2007
26		Luke Popko	Junior	F	5' 10" (1.78 m)	205 lb (93 kg)	1988-03-29	Skillman, New Jersey	USNTDP (USHL)	—
27		Vinny Saponari	Freshman	F	6' 0" (1.83 m)	203 lb (92 kg)	1990-02-15	Powder Springs, Georgia	USNTDP (USHL)	ATL, 94th overall 2008
31		Kieran Millan	Freshman	G	6' 0" (1.83 m)	190 lb (86 kg)	1989-08-31	Edmonton, Alberta	Spruce Grove Saints (AJHL)	—
32		Adam Kraus	Sophomore	G	6' 3" (1.91 m)	175 lb (79 kg)	1987-07-25	Irving, Texas	Alaska Avalanche (NAHL)	—
33		Colin Wilson	Sophomore	F	6' 1" (1.85 m)	215 lb (98 kg)	1989-10-20	Greenwich, Connecticut	USNTDP (USHL)	NSH, 7th overall 2008
35		Grant Rollheiser	Freshman	F	6' 4" (1.93 m)	225 lb (102 kg)	1989-07-24	Chilliwack, British Columbia	Trail Smoke Eaters (BCHL)	TOR, 158th overall 2008
97		Matt Gilroy (C)	Senior	D	6' 1" (1.85 m)	201 lb (91 kg)	1984-07-20	North Bellmore, New York	Walpole Jr. Stars (EJHL)	—

== Standings ==
2008–09 Hockey East standings
	Conference							Overall					
	GP	W	L	T	PTS	GF	GA	GP	W	L	T	GF	GA
#1 Boston University†*	27	18	5	4	40	103	54	45	35	6	4	177	91
#11 Northeastern	27	18	6	3	39	78	59	41	25	12	4	121	91
#6 New Hampshire	27	15	8	4	32	80	78	38	20	13	5	116	112
#3 Vermont	27	15	8	4	32	78	69	39	22	12	5	121	102
Massachusetts–Lowell	27	14	11	2	30	84	66	38	20	16	2	112	86
Boston College	27	11	11	5	27	81	77	37	18	14	5	112	105
Massachusetts	27	10	14	3	23	77	75	39	16	20	3	112	103
Maine	27	7	17	3	17	52	82	39	13	22	4	86	110
Merrimack	27	5	19	3	13	57	80	34	9	21	4	72	89
Providence	27	4	18	5	13	56	106	34	7	22	5	77	133
Championship: Boston University † indicates conference regular season champion * indicates conference tournament champion Final rankings: USA Today/USA Hockey Magazine Top 15 Poll

== Schedule and results ==
Date	Time	Opponent^{#}	Rank^{#}	Site	TV	Decision	Result	Attendance	Record
Exhibition
October 5	2:00 pm	New Brunswick*		Agganis Arena • Boston, Massachusetts (Exhibition)		Millan	W 4–1	3,069	
Ice Breaker Tournament
October 10	7:35 pm	#5 North Dakota*	#9	Agganis Arena • Boston, Massachusetts (Ice Breaker Semifinal)		Millan	W 5–1	3,753	1–0–0
October 11	7:35 pm	#11 Michigan State*	#9	Agganis Arena • Boston, Massachusetts (Ice Breaker Championship)		Rollheiser	W 2–1	4,207	2–0–0
Regular Season
October 17	7:05 pm	vs. Merrimack	#5	Agganis Arena • Boston, Massachusetts		Millan	W 5–2	5,213	3–0–0 (1–0–0)
October 19	5:00 pm	at #6 New Hampshire	#5	Whittemore Center • Durham, New Hampshire		Rollheiser	L 1–2	6,501	3–1–0 (1–1–0)
October 25	7:06 pm	#5 Michigan*	#6	Whittemore Center • Durham, New Hampshire		Millan	W 7–2	6,400	4–1–0
November 1	7:05 pm	at #14 Vermont	#3	Gutterson Fieldhouse • Burlington, Vermont		Rollheiser	W 7–2	4,003	5–1–0 (2–1–0)
November 7	7:00 pm	at Massachusetts–Lowell	#3	Tsongas Center • Lowell, Massachusetts		Millan	W 6–4	4,613	6–1–0 (3–1–0)
November 14	7:00 pm	at #20 Massachusetts	#1	Mullins Center • Amherst, Massachusetts		Rollheiser	L 1–5	7,212	6–2–0 (3–2–0)
November 16	7:30 pm	#7 Northeastern	#1	Agganis Arena • Boston, Massachusetts		Millan	W 3–0	5,496	7–2–0 (4–2–0)
November 21	7:30 pm	#15 Vermont	#2	Agganis Arena • Boston, Massachusetts		Rollheiser	L 3–4	5,187	7–3–0 (4–3–0)
November 22	7:05 pm	#15 Vermont	#2	Agganis Arena • Boston, Massachusetts		Millan	L 3–4	5,209	7–4–0 (4–4–0)
November 25	7:05 pm	Holy Cross	#8	Agganis Arena • Boston, Massachusetts		Rollheiser	W 3–2	4,710	8–4–0
November 29	7:05 pm	St. Lawrence	#8	Agganis Arena • Boston, Massachusetts		Millan	W 4–1	4,322	9–4–0
December 5	7:36 pm	#2 Boston College	#7	Agganis Arena • Boston, Massachusetts (Rivalry)		Millan	T 1–1 ^{OT}	6,221	9–4–1 (4–4–1)
December 6	7:05 pm	at #2 Boston College	#7	Conte Forum • Chestnut Hill, Massachusetts (Rivalry)		Millan	W 3–1	7,884	10–4–1 (5–4–1)
December 12	7:05 pm	Massachusetts–Lowell	#4	Agganis Arena • Boston, Massachusetts		Millan	W 3–2	4,520	11–4–1 (6–4–1)
Denver Cup
January 2	6:37 pm	vs. Rensselaer*	#3	Magness Arena • Denver, Colorado (Denver Cup Semifinal)		Rollheiser	W 6–2	5,453	12–4–1
January 3	9:07 pm	at #5 Denver*	#3	Magness Arena • Denver, Colorado (Denver Cup Championship)		Millan	W 4–1	6,050	13–4–1
January 10	7:05 pm	Maine	#2	Agganis Arena • Boston, Massachusetts (Rivalry)		Millan	W 4–1	5,767	14–4–1 (7–4–1)
January 13	7:05 pm	Providence	#2	Agganis Arena • Boston, Massachusetts		Rollheiser	L 2–4	4,242	14–5–1 (7–5–1)
January 16	7:00 pm	Merrimack	#2	J. Thom Lawler Rink • North Andover, Massachusetts		Millan	W 4–1	2,785	15–5–1 (8–5–1)
January 17	7:05 pm	#12 Boston College	#2	Agganis Arena • Boston, Massachusetts (Rivalry)		Millan	W 5–2	6,221	16–5–1 (9–5–1)
January 23	7:31 pm	#11 New Hampshire	#2	Agganis Arena • Boston, Massachusetts		Millan	W 5–0	6,170	17–5–1 (10–5–1)
January 24	7:00 pm	at #11 New Hampshire	#2	Whittemore Center • Durham, New Hampshire		Millan	W 3–1	6,501	18–5–1 (11–5–1)
January 30	7:00 pm	at Merrimack	#2	J. Thom Lawler Rink • North Andover, Massachusetts		Millan	W 3–1	2,681	19–5–1 (12–5–1)
Beanpot
February 2	5:00 pm	vs. Harvard*	#1	TD Garden • Boston, Massachusetts (Beanpot Semifinal)		Millan	W 4–3	17,565	20–5–1
February 6	7:05 pm	Massachusetts–Lowell	#1	Agganis Arena • Boston, Massachusetts		Millan	W 5–3	5,114	21–5–1 (13–5–1)
February 14	8:05 pm	vs. #3 Northeastern*	#1	TD Garden • Boston, Massachusetts (Beanpot Championship)		Millan	W 5–2	17,565	20–5–1
February 13	7:07 pm	at Maine	#1	Alfond Arena • Orono, Maine (Rivalry)		Millan	W 7–2	5,162	23–5–1 (14–5–1)
February 14	7:07 pm	at Maine	#1	Alfond Arena • Orono, Maine (Rivalry)		Rollheiser	T 2–2 ^{OT}	5,279	23–5–2 (14–5–2)
February 20	7:05 pm	#4 Northeastern	#1	Agganis Arena • Boston, Massachusetts		Millan	T 2–2 ^{OT}	6,221	23–5–3 (14–5–3)
February 21	8:05 pm	at #4 Northeastern	#1	Matthews Arena • Boston, Massachusetts		Millan	T 1–1 ^{OT}	5,407	23–5–4 (14–5–4)
February 27	7:00 pm	at Massachusetts	#1	Mullins Center • Amherst, Massachusetts		Rollheiser	W 6–3	8,291	24–5–4 (15–5–4)
February 28	8:05 pm	Massachusetts	#1	Agganis Arena • Boston, Massachusetts		Millan	W 7–2	5,887	25–5–4 (16–5–4)
March 6	7:05 pm	at Providence	#1	Schneider Arena • Providence, Rhode Island		Millan	W 8–2	1,771	26–5–4 (17–5–4)
March 7	2:15 pm	at Providence	#1	Schneider Arena • Providence, Rhode Island		Rollheiser	W 3–0	4,797	27–5–4 (18–5–4)
Hockey East Tournament
March 13	7:05 pm	Maine*	#1	Agganis Arena • Boston, Massachusetts (Hockey East Quarterfinal Game 1; Rivalry)		Millan	W 2–1	3,825	28–5–4
March 14	7:05 pm	Maine*	#1	Agganis Arena • Boston, Massachusetts (Hockey East Quarterfinal Game 2; Rivalry)		Millan	L 3–6	4,094	28–6–4
March 15	7:05 pm	Maine*	#1	Agganis Arena • Boston, Massachusetts (Hockey East Quarterfinal Game 3; Rivalry)		Millan	W 6–2	3,642	29–6–4
March 20	8:50 pm	vs. #15 Boston College*	#2	TD Garden • Boston, Massachusetts (Hockey East Semifinal; Rivalry)		Millan	W 3–2	14,280	30–6–4
March 21	7:15 pm	vs. #19 Massachusetts–Lowell*	#2	TD Garden • Boston, Massachusetts (Hockey East Championship)		Millan	W 1–0	13,130	31–6–4
NCAA Tournament
March 28	5:58 pm	vs. #14 Ohio State*	#1	Verizon Wireless Arena • Manchester, New Hampshire (Northeast Regional Semifinal)		Millan	W 8–3	6,883	32–6–4
March 29	5:34 pm	vs. #12 New Hampshire*	#1	Verizon Wireless Arena • Manchester, New Hampshire (Northeast Regional Final)		Millan	W 2–1	7,863	33–6–4
April 9	8:30 pm	vs. #11 Vermont*	#1	Verizon Center • Washington, D.C. (National Semifinal)		Millan	W 5–4	18,427	34–6–4
April 11	7:00 pm	vs. #13 Miami*	#1	Verizon Center • Washington, D.C. (National Championship)		Millan	W 4–3 ^{OT}	18,512	35–6–4
*Non-conference game. ^{#}Rankings from USCHO.com Poll. All times are in Eastern Time. Source:

== National championship game ==
April 11, 2009	Boston University	4 – 3 (OT) (1–0, 0–1, 2–2, 1–0)	Miami	Verizon Center, Washington, D. C. Attendance: 18,512

Game reference
Referees: Todd Anderson, Marco Hunt; Tony Czech, Matt Ulwelling

Scoring summary
Period	Team	Goal	Assist(s)	Time	Score
1st	BU	Chris Connolly (10)	Warsofsky and Gryba	15:15	1–0 BU
2nd	MIA	Gary Steffes (11)	Miele and Palmer	22:01	1–1
3rd	MIA	Tommy Wingels (11)	Camper	52:31	2–1 MIA
3rd	MIA	Trent Vogelhuber (2)	Kaufman	55:52	3–1 MIA
3rd	BU	Zach Cohen (13) – EA	Bonino and Yip	59:00	3–2 MIA
3rd	BU	Nick Bonino (18) – EA	Gilroy and Higgins	59:42	3–3
Overtime	BU	Colby Cohen (8) – GW	Shattenkirk and Connolly	71:47	4–3 BU
Penalty summary
Period	Team	Player	Penalty	Time	PIM
1st	BU	Eric Gryba	Tripping	2:23	2:00
1st	BU	Vinny Saponari	Cross–Checking	5:19	2:00
1st	MIA	Chris Wideman	Holding	12:01	2:00
1st	BU	John McCarthy	Roughing	12:01	2:00
1st	BU	Eric Gryba	Cross–Checking	15:46	2:00
1st	MIA	Tommy Wingels	Hooking	19:48	2:00
2nd	BU	Brandon Yip	Holding	23:13	2:00
2nd	MIA	Justin Mercier	Tripping	26:09	2:00
2nd	BU	Colby Cohen	Cross–Checking	37:17	2:00
3rd	BU	Colby Cohen	Slashing	45:51	2:00
3rd	BU	Jason Lawrence	Slashing	53:38	2:00

Shots by period
Team	1	2	3	OT	T
Miami	10	9	9	4	32
Boston University	9	7	7	9	32

Goaltenders
Team	Name	Saves	Goals against	Time on ice
MIA	Cody Reichard	28	4	71:47
BU	Kieran Millan	29	3	69:09

== Scoring statistics ==
Name	Position	Games	Goals	Assists	Points	PIM
Colin Wilson	C	43	17	38	55	52
Nick Bonino	C	44	18	32	50	30
Chris Higgins	C	42	14	34	48	40
Brandon Yip	RW	45	20	23	43	118
Jason Lawrence	F	44	25	14	39	38
Matt Gilroy	D	45	8	29	37	12
Colby Cohen	D	43	8	24	32	65
Chris Connolly	RW	45	10	20	30	12
John McCarthy	LW	45	6	23	29	24
Kevin Shattenkirk	D	43	7	21	28	40
David Warsofsky	D	45	3	20	23	28
Zach Cohen	F	41	13	5	18	22
Vinny Saponari	RW	44	8	9	17	39
Luke Popko	F	45	5	9	14	24
Corey Trivino	C	32	6	7	13	14
Joe Pereira	F	34	3	7	10	74
Brian Strait	D	38	2	5	7	67
Eric Gryba	D	45	0	6	6	106
Andrew Glass	LW	15	2	1	3	2
Kevin Gilroy	F	12	2	0	2	2
Steve Smolinsky	F	14	0	1	1	0
Victor Saponari	F	5	0	0	0	2
Grant Rollheiser	G	12	0	0	0	0
Kieran Millan	G	35	0	0	0	0
Bench	-	-	-	-	-	12
Total			177	328	505	823

== Goaltending statistics ==
Name	Games	Minutes	Wins	Losses	Ties	Goals against	Saves	Shut outs	SV %	GAA
Kieran Millan	35	2072:50	29	2	3	67	776	3	.921	1.94
Grant Rollheiser	12	647:47	6	4	1	23	201	1	.897	2.13
Empty Net	–	11:10	–	–	–	1	–	–	–	–
Total	45	2731:47	35	6	4	91	977	4	.915	2.00

== Rankings ==
Poll	Week																									
Poll	Pre	1	2	3	4	5	6	7	8	9	10	11	12	13	14	15	16	17	18	19	20	21	22	23	24	25 (Final)
USCHO.com	-	9	5	6	3	3	1	2	8	7	4	3	2	2	2	2	1	1	1	1	1	1	2	1	-	-
USA Today	10	9	5	7	3	3	1	2	8	5	4	3	2	2	2	2	1	1	1	2	1	1	1	1	1	1

Note: USCHO did not release a poll in weeks 0, 24 and 25.

== Awards and honors ==
Player	Award	Ref
Matt Gilroy	Hobey Baker Award	
Jack Parker	Spencer Penrose Award	
Kieran Millan	National Rookie of the Year	
Colby Cohen	NCAA Tournament Most Outstanding Player	
Matt Gilroy	AHCA East First Team All-American	
Colin Wilson	AHCA East First Team All-American	
Kevin Shattenkirk	AHCA East Second Team All-American	
Kieran Millan	Hockey East Rookie of the Year	
Kieran Millan	William Flynn Tournament Most Valuable Player	
Matt Gilroy	All-Hockey East First Team	
Colin Wilson	All-Hockey East First Team	
Kieran Millan	Hockey East Second Team	
Kevin Shattenkirk	Hockey East Second Team	
Kieran Millan	Hockey East All-Rookie Team	
Chris Connolly	Hockey East All-Rookie Team	
Kieran Millan	Hockey East All-Tournament Team	
Matt Gilroy	Hockey East All-Tournament Team	
Colin Wilson	Hockey East All-Tournament Team	
John McCarthy	Hockey East All-Tournament Team	
Kieran Millan	NCAA All-Tournament Team	
Colby Cohen	NCAA All-Tournament Team	
Nick Bonino	NCAA All-Tournament Team	
Colin Wilson	NCAA All-Tournament Team	

== Players drafted into the NHL ==
=== 2009 NHL entry draft ===
= NHL All-Star team	= NHL All-Star	= NHL All-Star and NHL All-Star team	= Did not play in the NHL

Round	Pick	Player	NHL team
2	38	Alex Chiasson^{†}	Dallas Stars
5	124	Kieran Millan	Colorado Avalanche
5	138	Wade Megan^{†}	Florida Panthers

† incoming freshman
