= 2009 NCAA Division I men's ice hockey tournament =

- 2009 Frozen Four logo
- Teams: 16
- Finals site: Verizon Center, Washington, D.C.
- Champions: Boston University Terriers (5th title)
- Runner-up: Miami RedHawks (1st title game)
- Semifinalists: Bemidji State Beavers (1st Frozen Four); Vermont Catamounts (2nd Frozen Four)
- Winning coach: Jack Parker (3rd title)
- MOP: Colby Cohen (Boston University)
- Attendance: 135,631

The 2009 NCAA Division I men's ice hockey tournament involved 16 schools playing in single-elimination play to determine the national champion of men's NCAA Division I college ice hockey as the culmination of the 2008–09 season. The tournament began on March 27, 2009, and ended with the championship game on April 11.

Boston University, coached by Jack Parker, won its fifth national title (and first since 1995) with a 4–3 overtime victory in the championship game over Miami University, coached by Enrico Blasi. The game marked the thirteenth time the NCAA championship game has gone to overtime and the first since Minnesota's win over Maine in 2002.

Colby Cohen, sophomore defenseman for Boston University, scored the championship-winning goal in overtime and was named the Frozen Four's Most Outstanding Player.

This year’s Frozen Four featured multiple teams, Bemidji State and Miami, making their first appearance. This last occurred in 1988, when Lake Superior State and Maine both made their first Frozen Four appearances.

== Tournament procedure ==
2008 Regionals (blue) and Frozen Four (red)

The 2009 NCAA Men's Division I Ice Hockey Championship was a single-elimination tournament featuring 16 teams representing all six Division I conferences in the nation. The Championship Committee seeded the entire field from 1 to 16 within four regionals of 4 teams. The winners of the six Division I conference championships received automatic bids to participate in the NCAA Championship.

In setting up the tournament, the Championship Committee sought to ensure "competitive equity, financial success and likelihood of playoff-type atmosphere at each regional site." A team serving as the host of a regional was placed within that regional. The top four teams were assigned overall seeds and placed within the bracket such that the national semifinals would feature the No. 1 seed versus the No. 4 seed and the No. 2 seed versus the No. 3 seed had the top four teams have won their respective regional finals. Number 1 seeds were also placed as close to their home site as possible, with the No. 1 seed receiving first preference. Conference matchups were avoided in the first round; should five or more teams from one conference have made the tournament, this guideline may have been disregarded in favor of preserving the bracket's integrity.

The four regionals were officially named after their geographic areas. The following were the sites for the 2009 regionals:

March 27 and 28
East Regional, Arena at Harbor Yard – Bridgeport, Connecticut (Hosts: Yale University and Fairfield University)
West Regional, Mariucci Arena – Minneapolis, Minnesota (Host: University of Minnesota)

March 28 and 29
Midwest Regional, Van Andel Arena – Grand Rapids, Michigan (Hosts: Central Collegiate Hockey Association and Western Michigan University)
Northeast Regional, Verizon Wireless Arena – Manchester, New Hampshire (Host: University of New Hampshire)

Each regional winner advanced to the Frozen Four:

April 9 and 11
Verizon Center – Washington, D.C. (Hosts: United States Naval Academy and the Greater Washington Sports Alliance)

== Qualifying teams ==
The at-large bids and seeding for each team in the tournament were announced on March 22, 2009. The Central Collegiate Hockey Association (CCHA) and Hockey East each had four teams receive a berth in the tournament, while ECAC Hockey and the Western Collegiate Hockey Association (WCHA) each had three teams receive a berth, and Atlantic Hockey and College Hockey America (CHA) each had one team receive a berth.

Northeast Regional – Manchester						Midwest Regional – Grand Rapids					
Seed	School	Conference	Record	Berth type	Last Bid	Seed	School	Conference	Record	Berth type	Last Bid
1	Boston University (1)	Hockey East	31–6–4	Tournament champion	2007	1	Notre Dame (2)	CCHA	31–5–3	Tournament champion	2008
2	North Dakota	WCHA	24–14–4	At-large bid	2008	2	Northeastern	Hockey East	25–11–4	At-large bid	1994
3	New Hampshire	Hockey East	19–12–5	At-large bid	2008	3	Cornell	ECAC Hockey	21–9–4	At-large bid	2006
4	Ohio State	CCHA	23–14–4	At-large bid	2005	4	Bemidji State	CHA	18–15–1	Tournament champion	2006
West Regional – Minneapolis						East Regional – Bridgeport					
Seed	School	Conference	Record	Berth type	Last Bid	Seed	School	Conference	Record	Berth type	Last Bid
1	Denver (3)	WCHA	23–11–5	At-large bid	2008	1	Michigan (4)	CCHA	29–11–0	At-large bid	2008
2	Minnesota-Duluth	WCHA	21–12–8	Tournament champion	2004	2	Yale	ECAC Hockey	24–7–2	Tournament champion	1998
3	Princeton	ECAC Hockey	22–11–1	At-large bid	2008	3	Vermont	Hockey East	20–11–5	At-large bid	1997
4	Miami	CCHA	20–12–5	At-large bid	2008	4	Air Force	Atlantic Hockey	27–10–2	Tournament champion	2008

== Bracket ==
Regional Semifinals; March 27–28
1	Boston University (1)	8
4	Ohio State	3
Northeast – Bridgeport – Sat/Sun
2	North Dakota	5
3	New Hampshire	6*
1	Michigan (4)	0
4	Air Force	2
East – Manchester – Fri/Sat
2	Yale	1
3	Vermont	4
1	Notre Dame (2)	1
4	Bemidji State	5
Midwest – Grand Rapids – Sat/Sun
2	Northeastern	2
3	Cornell	3
1	Denver (3)	2
4	Miami	4
West – Minneapolis – Fri/Sat
2	Minnesota-Duluth	5*
3	Princeton	4

Regional Finals; March 28–29
1	Boston University (1)	2
3	New Hampshire	1
4	Air Force	2
3	Vermont	3**
4	Bemidji State	4
3	Cornell	1
4	Miami	2
2	Minnesota-Duluth	1

National Semifinals; April 9
NE1	Boston University (1)	5
E3	Vermont	4
MW4	Bemidji State	1
W4	Miami	4

National Championship; April 11
NE1	Boston University (1)	4*
W4	Miami	3

The number in parentheses denotes overall seed in the tournament
(*) denotes overtime period(s).

== Results ==
=== Northeast Regional – Manchester, New Hampshire ===
==== Regional Semifinals ====
March 28, 2009; 6:00 pm	(1) Boston University	8–3 (3–0, 3–2, 2–1)	(4) Ohio State	Verizon Wireless Arena; Attendance: 6,883

Game reference

Kieran Millan
Goalies
Dustin Carlson (out 27:01)
Cal Heeter (in 27:01)
Referees:
Tim Kotyra
Bob Ritchie
Linesmen:
Dave Brow
Brett Reed

(Yip, Gilroy) Nick Bonino – PP – 08:49	1 – 0
(Bonino, C. Cohen) Jason Lawrence – 09:34	2 – 0
(Popko, Gilroy) Zach Cohen – 13:16	3 – 0
(Gilroy) Corey Trivino – GW – 25:57	4 – 0
(McCarthy, Bonino) Brandon Yip – 27:01	5 – 0
(Wilson, Higgins) Jason Lawrence – 33:34	6 – 0
	6 – 1	35:12 – Hunter Bishop (Elkins)
	6 – 2	38:45 – Zach Pelletier (Reed, Schafer)
	6 – 3	51:12 – PP – Matt Bartkowski (Boots, Bishop)
(Gilroy, C. Cohen) Zach Cohen – EN – 53:40	7 – 3
(Wilson) Chris Higgins – EN SH – 57:12	8 – 3

16 min
Penalties
8 min
27
Shots
25

March 28, 2009; 2:00 pm	(2) North Dakota	5–6 (OT) (2–1, 2–2, 1–2, 0–1)	(3) New Hampshire	Verizon Wireless Arena; Attendance: 6,883

Game reference

Brad Eidsness
Goalies
Brian Foster
Referees:
Peter Feola
Chip McDonald
Linesmen:
Joe Testa
Glen Cooke

	0 – 1	2:34 – PP – Mike Sislo (van Riemsdyk, Fritsch)
(unassisted) Jason Gregoire – 3:34	1 – 1
(Kozek) Brad Malone – 13:55	2 – 1
	2 – 2	24:08 – Jerry Pollastrone (Kapstad)
	2 – 3	27:21 – Peter LeBlanc (Collins, Butler)
(Hextall, Gregoire) Ryan Duncan – 29:47	3 – 3
(Malone, Frattin) Chris VandeVelde – 37:06	4 – 3
(Frattin) Chris VandeVelde – 49:08	5 – 3
	5 – 4	51:00 – Greg Collins (Kipp, Butler)
	5 – 5	59:59 – EA – Thomas Fortney (Pollastrone, Sislo)
	5 – 6	60:45 – GW – Peter LeBlanc (Pollastrone, Sislo)

12 min
Penalties
10 min
45
Shots
34

==== Regional Final ====
March 29, 2009; 5:30 pm	(1) Boston University	2–1 (1–0, 0–1, 1–0)	(3) New Hampshire	Verizon Wireless Arena; Attendance: 7,863

Game reference

Kieran Millan
Goalies
Brian Foster
Referees:
Peter Feola
Chip McDonald
Linesmen:
Glen Cooke
Rich Patry

(Connolly, Saponari) Corey Trivino – 13:43	1 – 0
	1 – 1	25:52 – Bobby Butler (LeBlanc, Collins)
(Higgins, C. Cohen) Jason Lawrence – GW PP – 59:45	2 – 1

6 min
Penalties
8 min
23
Shots
28

=== Midwest Regional – Grand Rapids, Michigan ===
==== Regional Semifinals ====
March 28, 2009; 7:40 pm	(1) Notre Dame	1–5 (0–2, 0–1, 1–2)	(4) Bemidji State	Van Andel Arena; Attendance: 4,052

Game reference

Jordan Pearce
Goalies
Matt Dalton
Referees:
Derek Sheppard
Don Adam
Linesmen:
Ed Moberg
Brian Novlesky

	0 – 1	01:42 – Chris McKelvie (unassisted)
	0 – 2	11:03 – GW PP – Tyler Scofield (Hunt, Read)
	0 – 3	33:19 – Ben Kinne (Cramer, Walters)
	0 – 4	40:49 – SH – Matt Read (Scofield, Hardwick)
(Guentzel, Blatchford) Dan Kissel – 46:02	1 – 4
	1 – 5	56:33 – EN – Tyler Scofield (unassisted)

10 min
Penalties
8 min
35
Shots
19

March 28, 2009; 4:00 pm	(2) Northeastern	2–3 (1–0, 1–1, 0–2)	(3) Cornell	Van Andel Arena; Attendance: 4,052

Game reference

Brad Thiessen
Goalies
Ben Scrivens
Referees:
Kevin Hall
Brian Hill
Linesmen:
Chris Davis
Paul Tunison

(Silva, Maley) Louis Liotti – 19:20	1 – 0
(Donovan) Steve Silva – 29:21	2 – 0
	2 – 1	37:58 – Blake Gallagher (Greening, Kennedy)
	2 – 2	56:04 – PP – Colin Greening (Barlow, B. Nash)
	2 – 3	59:42 – GW – Evan Barlow (R. Nash, Gallagher)

10 min
Penalties
14 min
21
Shots
32

==== Regional Final ====
March 29, 2009; 8:00 pm	(3) Cornell	1–4 (0–0, 1–1, 0–3)	(4) Bemidji State	Van Andel Arena; Attendance: 3,170

Game reference

Ben Scrivens
Goalies
Matt Dalton
Referees:
Kevin Hall
Brian Hill
Linesmen:
Chris Davis
Paul Tunison

(Ross, Mugford) Sean Collins – 32:35	1 – 0
	1 – 1	34:25 – Ryan Adams (Scofield)
	1 – 2	44:05 – GW – Tyler Scofield (Read, Hardwick)
	1 – 3	49:30 – Matt Francis (Kinne)
	1 – 4	56:37 – EN – Tyler Scofield (Read, McManamin)

8 min
Penalties
10 min
26
Shots
21

=== West Regional – Minneapolis, Minnesota ===
==== Regional Semifinals ====
March 27, 2009; 4:30 pm	(1) Denver	2–4 (0–2, 2–1, 0–1)	(4) Miami	Mariucci Arena; Attendance: 7,187

Game reference

Marc Cheverie
Goalies
Cody Reichard
Referees:
Tim Benedetto
Jeff Bunyon
Linesmen:
Chris Aughe
Bob Bernard

	0 – 1	07:28 – Justin Mercier (Vogelhuber)
	0 – 2	18:04 – Alden Hirschfeld (Roeder, Wingels)
	0 – 3	25:36 – GW – Bill Loupée (Camper, Wingels)
(Wiercioch, Bozak) Joe Colborne – PP – 37:29	1 – 3
	1 – 4	39:27 – Andy Miele (Steffes, LoVerde)
(Wiercioch, Rakhshani) Tyler Bozak – EA PP – 55:12	2 – 4

12 min
Penalties
12 min
18
Shots
29

March 27, 2009; 8:00 pm	(2) Minnesota-Duluth	5–4 (OT) (1–1, 1–2, 2–1, 1–0)	(3) Princeton	Mariucci Arena; Attendance: 7,187

Game reference

Alex Stalock
Goalies
Zane Kalemba

(Oleksuk, Gergen) Andrew Carroll – 08:17	1 – 0
	1 – 1	14:56 – PP – Brett Wilson (Godlewski)
	1 – 2	21:42 – Derrick Pallis (Bartlett, MacIntyre)
	1 – 3	28:10 – Brett Wilson (Godlewski, Schroeder)
(Akins) Brady Lamb – 28:39	2 – 3
	2 – 4	49:21 – SH – Brandan Kushniruk (unassisted)
(Sharp, M. Connolly) Jack Connolly – EA PP – 59:20	3 – 4
(Sharp, M. Connolly) Evan Oberg – EA – 59:59	4 – 4
(Fontaine, Oberg) Mike Connolly – GW PP – 73:39	5 – 4

4 min
Penalties
12 min
35
Shots
31

==== Regional Final ====
March 28, 2009; 8:00 pm	(2) Minnesota-Duluth	1–2 (0–0, 0–2, 1–0)	(4) Miami	Mariucci Arena; Attendance: 7,554

Game reference

Alex Stalock
Goalies
Cody Reichard
Referees:
Jeff Bunyon
Jim Benedetto
Linesmen:
Bob Bernard
Chris Aughe

	0 – 1	28:42 – SH – Justin Mercier (unassisted)
	0 – 2	36:00 – GW PP – Justin Mercier (Wideman, Schilling)
(M. Connolly, Oberg) MacGregor Sharp – EA – 57:55	1 – 2

16 min
Penalties
14 min
26
Shots
19

=== East Regional – Bridgeport, Connecticut ===
==== Regional Semifinals ====
March 27, 2009; 3:00 pm	(1) Michigan	0–2 (0–1, 0–1, 0–0)	(4) Air Force	Arena at Harbor Yard; Attendance: 8,478

Game reference
Bryan Hogan	Goalies	Andrew Volkening	Referees: John Gravallese; Tom Fyrer; Linesmen: Chris Millea; Chris Federico
0 – 1 / 15:18 – GW PP – Derrick Burnett (Hajner, Flynn); 0 – 2 / 27:02 – Jacques Lamoureux (Fairchild, Flynn)			Referees: John Gravallese; Tom Fyrer; Linesmen: Chris Millea; Chris Federico
14 min	Penalties	16 min	Referees: John Gravallese; Tom Fyrer; Linesmen: Chris Millea; Chris Federico
43	Shots	13	Referees: John Gravallese; Tom Fyrer; Linesmen: Chris Millea; Chris Federico

March 27, 2009; 6:30 pm	(2) Yale	1–4 (0–1, 0–2, 1–1)	(3) Vermont	Arena at Harbor Yard; Attendance: 8,478

Game reference

Alec Richards
Goalies
Rob Madore
Referees:
Todd Anderson
Marco Hunt
Linesmen:
Tony Czech
Matti Ulwelling

	0 – 1	14:28 – Peter Lenes (Medvec)
	0 – 2	21:50 – GW – Viktor Stålberg (Roloff)
	0 – 3	39:01 – Colin Vock (Stacey, Lawson)
	0 – 4	56:25 – Corey Carlson (unassisted)
(Donald) Chris Cahill – 58:15	1 – 4

10 min
Penalties
14 min
26
Shots
26

==== Regional Final ====
March 28, 2009; 6:30 pm	(3) Vermont	3–2 (2OT) (0–0, 0–1, 2–1, 0–0, 1–0)	(4) Air Force	Arena at Harbor Yard; Attendance: 8,478

Game reference

Rob Madore
Goalies
Andrew Volkening
Referees:
Todd Anderson
Marco Hunt
Linesmen:
Tony Czech
Matt Ulwelling

	0 – 1	23:46 – Paul Weisgarber (Bertsch, Mathis)
(Cullity, Milo) Josh Burrows – 43:56	1 – 1
(Carlson) Dan Lawson – 49:29	2 – 1
	2 – 2	51:18 – Sean Bertsch (Phillipich)
(Stacey, Stålberg) Dan Lawson – GW – 94:10	3 – 2

10 min
Penalties
8 min
35
Shots
48

=== Frozen Four – Washington, DC ===
==== National Semifinals ====
April 9, 2009; 5:00 pm	(W4) Miami	4–1 (0–0, 3–1, 1–0)	(MW4) Bemidji State	Verizon Center; Attendance: 18,427

Game reference

Cody Reichard
Goalies
Matt Dalton
Referees:
Peter Feola, Chip McDonald
Glen Cooke, Dave Brown

(Tomassoni, Miele) Tommy Wingels – PP – 23:56	1 – 0
(Wingles, Camper) Alden Hirschfeld – GW – 28:35	2 – 0
	2 – 1	29:46 – PP – Matt Read (Francis, Scofield)
(Weber) Bill Loupée – 30:46	3 – 1
(unassisted) Tommy Wingels – EN – 57:52	4 – 1

8 min
Penalties
4 min
37
Shots
25

April 9, 2009; 8:30 pm	(NE1) Boston University	5–4 (2–0, 1–3, 2–1)	(E3) Vermont	Verizon Center; Attendance: 18,427

Game reference

Kieran Millan
Goalies
Rob Madore
Referees:
Matt Shegos
Brian Hill
Linesmen:
Tony Molina
TJ Likens

(Shattenkirk, Higgins) Colin Wilson – 11:19	1 – 0
(Higgins, Wilson) Jason Lawrence – 16:27	2 – 0
	2 – 1	23:50 – Wahsontiio Stacey (Cullity, Burrows)
	2 – 2	29:04 – PP – Justin Milo (MacKenzie, Stålberg)
	2 – 3	29:49 – Josh Burrows (unassisted)
(Bonino, Yip) Vinnie Saponari – PP – 38:39	3 – 3
	3 – 4	49:40 – PP – Drew MacKenzie (Roloff, Milo)
(Lawrence, Strait) Chris Higgins – 53:06	4 – 4
(Higgins) Colin Wilson – GW – 54:19	5 – 4

10 min
Penalties
18 min
28
Shots
27

==== National Championship ====
April 11, 2009; 7:00 pm	(NE1) Boston University	4 – 3 (OT) (1–0, 0–1, 2–2, 1–0)	(W4) Miami	Verizon Center; Attendance: 18,512

Game reference
Referees: Todd Anderson; Marco Hunt; Linesmen: Tony Czech; Matt Ulwelling

Scoring summary
Period	Team	Goal	Assist(s)	Time	Score
1st	BU	Chris Connolly (10)	Warsofsky and Gryba	15:15	1–0 BU
2nd	MIA	Gary Steffes (11)	Miele and Palmer	22:01	1–1
3rd	MIA	Tommy Wingels (11)	Camper	52:31	2–1 MIA
3rd	MIA	Trent Vogelhuber (2)	Kaufman	55:52	3–1 MIA
3rd	BU	Zach Cohen (13) – EA	Bonino and Yip	59:00	3–2 MIA
3rd	BU	Nick Bonino (18) – EA	Gilroy and Higgins	59:42	3–3
Overtime	BU	Colby Cohen (8) – GW	Shattenkirk and Connolly	71:47	4–3 BU
Penalty summary
Period	Team	Player	Penalty	Time	PIM
1st	BU	Eric Gryba	Tripping	2:23	2:00
1st	BU	Vinny Saponari	Cross–checking	5:19	2:00
1st	MIA	Chris Wideman	Holding	12:01	2:00
1st	BU	John McCarthy	Roughing	12:01	2:00
1st	BU	Eric Gryba	Cross–checking	15:46	2:00
1st	MIA	Tommy Wingels	Hooking	19:48	2:00
2nd	BU	Brandon Yip	Holding	23:13	2:00
2nd	MIA	Justin Mercier	Tripping	26:09	2:00
2nd	BU	Colby Cohen	Cross–checking	37:17	2:00
3rd	BU	Colby Cohen	Slashing	45:51	2:00
3rd	BU	Jason Lawrence	Slashing	53:38	2:00

Shots by period
Team	1	2	3	OT	T
Miami	10	9	9	4	32
Boston University	9	7	7	9	32

Goaltenders
Team	Name	Saves	Goals against	Time on ice
MIA	Cody Reichard	28	4	71:47
BU	Kieran Millan	29	3	69:09

== Record by conference ==
Conference	# of Bids	Record	Win %	Regional Finals	Frozen Four	Championship Game	Champions
Hockey East	4	7–3	.700	3	2	1	1
CCHA	4	3–4	.429	1	1	1	–
ECAC Hockey	3	1–3	.250	1	–	–	–
WCHA	3	1–3	.250	1	–	–	–
Atlantic Hockey	1	1–1	.500	1	–	–	–
CHA	1	2–1	.667	1	1	–	–

== Media ==
=== Television ===
ESPN had US television rights to all games during the tournament. For the fifth consecutive year ESPN aired every game, beginning with the regionals, on ESPN, ESPN2, ESPNU, ESPN Classic and ESPN360.

==== Broadcast Assignments ====
Regionals

- East Regional: Justin Kutcher, Damian DiGiulian, & Ken Hodge – Bridgeport, Connecticut
- West Regional: Clay Matvick & Jim Paradise – Minneapolis, Minnesota
- Midwest Regional: Ben Holden & Sean Ritchlin – Grand Rapids, Michigan
- Northeast Regional: John Buccigross & Barry Melrose – Manchester, New Hampshire

Frozen Four & Championship

- Gary Thorne, Barry Melrose, & Clay Matvick – Washington, DC

=== Radio ===
Westwood One used exclusive radio rights to air both the semifinals and the championship, AKA the "Frozen Four.

- Sean Grande & Cap Raeder

== All-Tournament Team ==
=== East Regional ===
==== All-East Regional Team ====
- Goaltender: Andrew Volkening (Air Force)
- Defensemen: Greg Flynn (Air Force), Dan Lawson (Vermont)
- Forwards: Sean Bertsch (Air Force), Jacques Lamoureux (Air Force), Viktor Stalberg (Vermont)

==== MOP ====
- Dan Lawson (Vermont)

=== Northeast Regional ===
==== All-Northeast Regional Team ====
- Goaltender: Kieran Millan (Boston University)
- Defensemen: Matt Gilroy (Boston University), Kevin Kapstad (New Hampshire)
- Forwards: Nick Bonino (Boston University), Jason Lawrence (Boston University), Peter Leblanc (New Hampshire)

==== MOP ====
- Jason Lawrence (Boston University)

=== West Regional ===
==== All-West Regional Team ====
- Goaltender: Cody Reichard (Miami)
- Defensemen: Evan Oberg (Minnesota-Duluth), Cameron Schilling (Miami)
- Forwards: Mike Connolly (Minnesota-Duluth), Justin Mercier (Miami), Brett Wilson (Princeton)

==== MOP ====
- Justin Mercier (Miami)

=== Midwest Regional ===
==== All-Midwest Regional Team ====
- Goaltender: Matt Dalton (Bemidji State)
- Defensemen: Ryan Adams (Bemidji State), Brad Hunt (Bemidji State)
- Forwards: Evan Barlow (Cornell), Matt Read (Bemidji State), Tyler Scofield (Bemidji State)

==== MOP ====
- Tyler Scofield (Bemidji State)

=== Frozen Four ===
- G: Kieran Millan (Boston University)
- D: Colby Cohen* (Boston University)
- D: Kevin Roeder (Miami)
- F: Nick Bonino (Boston University)
- F: Colin Wilson (Boston University)
- F: Tommy Wingels (Miami)

* Most Outstanding Player(s)
