= 2009 Hockey East men's ice hockey tournament =

2009 Hockey East Men's ice hockey tournament
- Dates: March 13–21, 2009
- Teams: 8
- Finals site: TD Banknorth Garden; Boston, Massachusetts
- Champions: Boston University (7th title)
- Winning coach: Jack Parker (7th title)
- MVP: Kieran Millan (Boston University)
- Hockey East Men's Ice Hockey Tournaments

The 2009 Hockey East Men's Ice Hockey Tournament was the 25th tournament in the history of the conference. It was played between March 13 and March 21, 2009 at campus locations and at the TD Banknorth Garden in Boston, Massachusetts, United States. Boston University won their seventh Hockey East Men's Ice Hockey Tournament and the Lamoriello Trophy and received Hockey East's automatic bid to the 2009 NCAA Division I Men's Ice Hockey Tournament.

== Format ==
The tournament featured three rounds of play. The teams that finish below eighth in the conference are not eligible for tournament play. In the first round, the first and eighth seeds, the second and seventh seeds, the third seed and sixth seeds, and the fourth seed and fifth seeds played a best-of-three with the winner advancing to the semifinals. In the semifinals, the highest and lowest seeds and second-highest and second-lowest seeds play a single-elimination game, with the winner advancing to the championship game. The tournament champion receives an automatic bid to the 2009 NCAA Division I Men's Ice Hockey Tournament.

== Regular season standings ==
Note: GP = Games played; W = Wins; L = Losses; T = Ties; PTS = Points; GF = Goals For; GA = Goals Against

2008–09 Hockey East standings
| | Conference | | | | | | | Overall | | | | | |
| | GP | W | L | T | PTS | GF | GA | GP | W | L | T | GF | GA |
|---|---|---|---|---|---|---|---|---|---|---|---|---|---|
| #1 Boston University†* | 27 | 18 | 5 | 4 | 40 | 103 | 54 | 45 | 35 | 6 | 4 | 177 | 91 |
| #11 Northeastern | 27 | 18 | 6 | 3 | 39 | 78 | 59 | 41 | 25 | 12 | 4 | 121 | 91 |
| #6 New Hampshire | 27 | 15 | 8 | 4 | 32 | 80 | 78 | 38 | 20 | 13 | 5 | 116 | 112 |
| #3 Vermont | 27 | 15 | 8 | 4 | 32 | 78 | 69 | 39 | 22 | 12 | 5 | 121 | 102 |
| Massachusetts–Lowell | 27 | 14 | 11 | 2 | 30 | 84 | 66 | 38 | 20 | 16 | 2 | 112 | 86 |
| Boston College | 27 | 11 | 11 | 5 | 27 | 81 | 77 | 37 | 18 | 14 | 5 | 112 | 105 |
| Massachusetts | 27 | 10 | 14 | 3 | 23 | 77 | 75 | 39 | 16 | 20 | 3 | 112 | 103 |
| Maine | 27 | 7 | 17 | 3 | 17 | 52 | 82 | 39 | 13 | 22 | 4 | 86 | 110 |
| Merrimack | 27 | 5 | 19 | 3 | 13 | 57 | 80 | 34 | 9 | 21 | 4 | 72 | 89 |
| Providence | 27 | 4 | 18 | 5 | 13 | 56 | 106 | 34 | 7 | 22 | 5 | 77 | 133 |
Championship: Boston University † indicates conference regular season champion * indicates conference tournament champion Final rankings: USA Today/USA Hockey Magazine Top 15 Poll

== Bracket ==
Quarterfinals; March 13–15
1 | Boston University | 2 | 3 | 6
8 | Maine | 1 | 6 | 2
2 | Northeastern | 1 | 4 | 3*
7 | Massachusetts | 2 | 1 | 2
(Pairings are reseeded after the first round)
3 | New Hampshire | 3 | 0 | —
6 | Boston College | 5 | 1 | —
4 | Vermont | 3 | 2 | —
5 | Massachusetts-Lowell | 4* | 4 | —

Semifinals; March 20
1 | Boston University | 3
6 | Boston College | 2
2 | Northeastern | 2
5 | Massachusetts-Lowell | 3*

Championship; March 21
1 | Boston University | 1
5 | Massachusetts-Lowell | 0

Note: * denotes overtime period(s)

=== Quarterfinals ===
==== (1) Boston University vs. (8) Maine ====
| March 13 | Boston University | 2 – 1 | Maine | Agganis Arena | Recap |
| No Scoring | | First period | 19:37 - pp - Tanner House |
| Kevin Shattenkirk - 10:59 | | Second period | No scoring |
| Colby Cohen - pp - 17:04 | | Third period | No scoring |
| Kieran Millan ( 20 saves / 21 shots ) | | Goalie stats | Scott Darling ( 23 saves / 25 shots ) |

| March 14 | Boston University | 3 – 6 | Maine | Agganis Arena | Recap |
| Brandon Yip - 03:40; Luke Popko - 05:23; John McCarthy - sh - 11:41 | | First period | 00:42 - Christopher Hahn; 12:07 - pp - Gustav Nyquist; 12:38 - Keif Orsini |
| No scoring | | Second period | 10:11 - pp - Spencer Abbott |
| No scoring | | Third period | 06:16 -pp - Gustav Nyquist; 11:04 - pp - Robby Dee |
| Kieran Millan ( 20 saves / 26 shots ) | | Goalie stats | Scott Darling ( 29 saves / 32 shots ) |

| March 15 | Boston University | 6 – 2 | Maine | Agganis Arena | Recap |
| Colby Cohen - 00:58; Brandon Yip - 16:05; Joe Pereira - 16:34 | | First period | 14:19 - pp - Spencer Abbott |
| Corey Trivino - 09:13; Zach Cohen - 11:24; Nick Bonino - 15:04 | | Second period | No scoring |
| No scoring | | Third period | 17:20 - Gustav Nyquist |
| Kieran Millan ( 24 saves / 26 shots ) | | Goalie stats | Scott Darling ( 20 saves / 26 shots ) Josh Seeley ( 2 saves / 2 shots ) |

| Boston University won series 2–1 |

==== (2) Northeastern vs. (7) Massachusetts ====
| March 13 | Northeastern | 1 – 2 | Massachusetts | Matthews Arena | Recap |
| No Scoring | | First period | No scoring |
| No scoring | | Second period | No scoring |
| Wade MacLeod - sh - 04:51 | | Third period | 08:20 - Matthew Irwin; 12:30 - Chris Davis |
| Brad Thiessen ( 23 saves / 25 shots ) | | Goalie stats | Paul Dainton ( 26 saves / 27 shots ) |

| March 14 | Northeastern | 4 – 1 | Massachusetts | Matthews Arena | Recap |
| No Scoring | | First period | No scoring |
| Kyle Kraemer - 04:13; Steve Quailer - 15:20 | | Second period | No scoring |
| Alex Tuckerman - pp - 14:10; Greg Costa - en - 19:11 | | Third period | 05:20 - pp - Matthew Irwin |
| Brad Thiessen ( 32 saves / 33 shots ) | | Goalie stats | Paul Dainton ( 22 saves / 25 shots ) |

| March 15 | Northeastern | 3 – 2 | OT | Massachusetts | Matthews Arena | Recap |
| No Scoring | | First period | | No scoring |
| Alex Tuckerman - pp - 10:51; Ryan Ginand - 11:29 | | Second period | | 02:06 - pp - James Marcou |
| Alex Tuckerman - 10:26 | | Third period | | 19:25 - Matthew Irwin |
| Brad Thiessen ( 35 saves / 37 shots ) | | Goalie stats | | Paul Dainton ( 36 saves / 39 shots ) |

| Northeastern won series 2–1 |

==== (3) New Hampshire vs. (6) Boston College ====
| March 13 | New Hampshire | 3 – 5 | Boston College | Whittemore Center | Recap |
| No Scoring | | First period | 12:45 - pp - Brock Bradford; 15:38 - Andrew Orpik |
| James van Riemsdyk - sh - 11:48; Bobby Butler - sh - 16:41 | | Second period | 05:06 - sh - Jimmy Hayes; 10:48 - Tim Kunes; 14:42 - Brock Bradford |
| James van Riemsdyk - 02:52 | | Third period | No scoring |
| Brian Foster ( 24 saves / 29 shots ) | | Goalie stats | John Muse ( 35 saves / 38 shots ) |

| March 14 | New Hampshire | 0 – 1 | Boston College | Whittemore Center | Recap |
| No Scoring | | First period | 06:12 - Matt Price |
| No scoring | | Second period | No scoring |
| No scoring | | Third period | No scoring |
| Brian Foster ( 22 saves / 23 shots ) | | Goalie stats | John Muse ( 31 saves / 31 shots ) |

| Boston College won series 2–0 |

==== (4) Vermont vs. (5) Massachusetts-Lowell ====
| March 13 | Vermont | 3 – 4 | OT | Massachusetts-Lowell | Gutterson Fieldhouse | Recap |
| Peter Lenes - 18:19 | | First period | | No scoring |
| Dean Strong - 02:21 | | Second period | | 13:00 - Michael Scheu |
| Dan Lawson - 04:16 | | Third period | | 13:41 - pp - David Vallorani; 19:30 - Nick Schaus |
| No scoring | | First overtime period | | 19:58 - Maury Edwards |
| Rob Madore ( 24 saves / 28 shots ) | | Goalie stats | | Carter Hutton ( 27 saves / 30 shots ) |

| March 14 | Vermont | 2 – 4 | Massachusetts-Lowell | Gutterson Fieldhouse | Recap |
| Viktor Stalberg - pp - 00:59 | | First period | 08:12 - pp - Chris Auger |
| No scoring | | Second period | 15:03 - Mike Potacco |
| Justin Milo - 10:40 | | Third period | 10:29 - pp - Scott Campbell; 19:12 - en - Scott Campbell |
| Rob Madore ( 18 saves / 21 shots ) | | Goalie stats | Nevin Hamilton ( 22 saves / 24 shots ) |

| Massachusetts-Lowell won series 2–0 |

=== Semifinals ===
==== (1) Boston University vs. (6) Boston College ====
| March 20 | Boston University | 3 – 2 | Boston College | TD Banknorth Garden | Recap |
| No Scoring | | First period | No scoring |
| No scoring | | Second period | 17:50 - Ben Smith |
| Zach Cohen - 11:01; Brian Strait - 11:22; Colin Wilson - 11:45 | | Third period | 14:18 - Joe Whitney |
| Kieran Millan ( 17 saves / 18 shots ) | | Goalie stats | John Muse ( 18 saves / 21 shots ) |

==== (2) Northeastern vs. (5) Massachusetts-Lowell ====
| March 20 | Northeastern | 2 – 3 | OT | Massachusetts-Lowell | TD Banknorth Garden | Recap |
| No Scoring | | First period | | No scoring |
| Kyle Kraemer - pp - 08:44; Rob Rassey - 09:09 | | Second period | | 18:44 - Ryan Blair |
| No scoring | | Third period | | 19:40 - pp - Scott Campbell |
| No scoring | | First overtime period | | 03:00 - Chris Auger |
| Brad Thiessen ( 41 saves / 44 shots ) | | Goalie stats | | Carter Hutton ( 25 saves / 27 shots ) |

=== Championship ===
==== (1) Boston University vs. (5) Massachusetts-Lowell ====
| March 21 | Boston University | 1 – 0 | Massachusetts-Lowell | TD Banknorth Garden | Recap |
| Brandon Yip - 18:38 | | First period | No scoring |
| No scoring | | Second period | No scoring |
| No scoring | | Third period | No scoring |
| Kieran Millan ( 32 saves / 32 shots ) | | Goalie stats | Nevin Hamilton ( 31 saves / 32 shots ) |

== Tournament awards ==
=== All-Tournament Team ===
- F Scott Campbell (Massachusetts-Lowell)
- F John McCarthy (Boston University)
- F Colin Wilson (Boston University)
- D Maury Edwards (Massachusetts-Lowell)
- D Matt Gilroy (Boston University)
- G Kieran Millan* (Boston University)

* Tournament MVP(s)
