= John Henrion =

American ice hockey player

- Born: January 19, 1991 (age 34); Worcester, Massachusetts, U.S.
- Height: 5 ft 11 in (180 cm)
- Weight: 205 lb (93 kg; 14 st 9 lb)
- Position: Center
- Shoots: Right
- Allsv team Former teams: AIK IF; Florida Everblades; Vaasan Sport; Karlskrona HK; EHC Visp; Düsseldorfer EG
- NHL draft: Undrafted
- Playing career: 2013–present

John Henrion (born January 19, 1991) is an American professional ice hockey center who is currently playing with AIK IF in the HockeyAllsvenskan (Allsv).

== Playing career ==
Undrafted, Henrion played for the University of New Hampshire Wildcats from 2009 to 2013. He played 33 games for the Florida Everblades of the ECHL during the 2013–14 season before in January, 2014 moving to Finland and Sport of Finland's second highest league Mestis.

On January 18, 2017, Henrion left Karlskrona HK of the Swedish Hockey League to join EHC Visp of the National League B (NLB) for the remainder of the 2016–17 season. In 9 games he registered 7 points.

As a free agent, Henrion opted to continue his career on a one-year contract with German outfit, Düsseldorfer EG of the Deutsche Eishockey Liga, on May 10, 2017.

On September 10, 2019, Henrion returned to Sweden signing a contract with AIK IF of the HockeyAllsvenskan.

Awards and achievements
Preceded by Kieran Millan	Hockey East Three-Stars Award (with Martin Ouellette); 2012–13	Succeeded by Clay Witt
