= Scott Campbell (ice hockey, born 1986) =

Canadian professional ice hockey winger

- Born: June 6, 1986 (age 40) Navan, Ontario, Canada
- Height: 6 ft 2 in (188 cm)
- Weight: 209 lb (95 kg; 14 st 13 lb)
- Position: Left wing
- Shoots: Left
- Metal Ligaen team Former teams: SønderjyskE Ishockey; Houston Aeros; Rochester Americans; Texas Stars; Bridgeport Sound Tigers; Providence Bruins; HC Valpellice
- NHL draft: Undrafted
- Playing career: 2011–present

Scott Campbell (born June 6, 1986) is a Canadian professional ice hockey winger. He is currently playing with SønderjyskE Ishockey of the Danish Metal Ligaen.

== Early life ==
Campbell was born in Navan, Ontario. He played three seasons of junior hockey for the Pembroke Lumber Kings of the Central Canada Hockey League playing 130 games scoring 74 goals and 96 assists for 170 points and a 1.31 points per game average.

Starting in the 2007–08 season Campbell began attending the University of Massachusetts Lowell and playing for the River Hawks. In four seasons of college hockey at UMass Lowell, he played 126 games, scored 39 goals and 46 assists for 85 points and was named to the 2009–10 and 2010–11 Hockey East All-Academic Teams.

== Career ==
Following his final season with UMass Lowell Campbell signed a professional tryout contract with the Houston Aeros and played six games without scoring a point.

The 2011–12 season saw Campbell sign with the Las Vegas Wranglers of the ECHL where he played 51 regular season games, scoring 31 points. In the playoffs, he played 18 games scoring 10 points helping the Wranglers to the Western Conference championship, coming up three games short of a Kelly Cup Championship. On December 21, 2011, the Rochester Americans signed Campbell to a professional tryout contract, he played one game for the Americans before being released to return to the Wranglers. Campbell also signed a tryout contract with the Texas Stars of the AHL on February 18, 2012, where he played 12 games scoring no points, before being returned again to the Wranglers.

Campbell signed an extension with the Wranglers on August 14, 2012, to play in Las Vegas for the 2012–13 ECHL season, however he was signed to a tryout contract by the Bridgeport Sound Tigers on December 18, 2012. Campbell was successful in his tryout and signed a standard player contract with the team on February 13, 2013.

The Boston Bruins invited Campbell to their 2013–14 training camp but he was among the first round of cuts on September 18, 2013 and was reassigned to the Providence Bruins of the AHL. Campbell attended the Providence training camp however he was assigned to their ECHL affiliate the South Carolina Stingrays. After 21 games with the Stingrays he was recalled to the Providence Bruins on December 10, 2013.

On September 13, 2014, Campbell as a free agent signed his first contract abroad, agreeing to a one-year contract with Italian club, HC Valpellice of the Serie A. After one season in Italy, Campbell signed a one-year contract with SønderjyskE Ishockey of the Metal Ligaen.

== Career statistics ==
			Regular season					Playoffs
Season	Team	League	GP	G	A	Pts	PIM	GP	G	A	Pts	PIM
2002–03	Pembroke Lumber Kings	CJHL	51	3	12	15	43	—	—	—	—	—
2004–05	Pembroke Lumber Kings	CJHL	38	18	30	48	32	—	—	—	—	—
2006–07	Pembroke Lumber Kings	CJHL	41	53	54	107	34	15	10	11	21	12
2007–08	UMass Lowell	HE	37	7	11	18	20	—	—	—	—	—
2008–09	UMass Lowell	HE	38	14	16	30	32	—	—	—	—	—
2009–10	UMass Lowell	HE	39	16	18	34	20	—	—	—	—	—
2010–11	UMass Lowell	HE	12	2	1	3	8	—	—	—	—	—
2010–11	Houston Aeros	AHL	6	0	0	0	0	—	—	—	—	—
2011–12	Las Vegas Wranglers	ECHL	51	15	16	31	34	18	8	2	10	14
2011–12	Rochester Americans	AHL	1	0	0	0	0	—	—	—	—	—
2011–12	Texas Stars	AHL	12	0	0	0	0	—	—	—	—	—
2012–13	Las Vegas Wranglers	ECHL	24	4	6	10	17	—	—	—	—	—
2012–13	Bridgeport Sound Tigers	AHL	46	7	11	18	33	—	—	—	—	—
2013–14	South Carolina Stingrays	ECHL	32	11	13	24	11	2	0	0	0	2
2013–14	Providence Bruins	AHL	23	2	1	3	0	—	—	—	—	—
2014–15	HC Valpellice	Serie A	37	26	37	63	16	—	—	—	—	—
2015–16	SønderjyskE	Metal Ligaen	45	26	15	41	20	13	3	5	8	4
AHL totals			88	9	12	21	33	—	—	—	—	—

== Awards and honors ==
Award	Year(s)
CJHL Most Goals	2006–07
CJHL Most Points	2006–07
CJHL Champion - Pembroke Lumber Kings	2006–07
Fred Page Cup Champion - Pembroke Lumber Kings	2006–07
Hockey East All-Tournament Team	2009
NCAA (Hockey East) All-Academic Team	2009–10, 2010–11
