= Maury Edwards =

Canadian ice hockey player

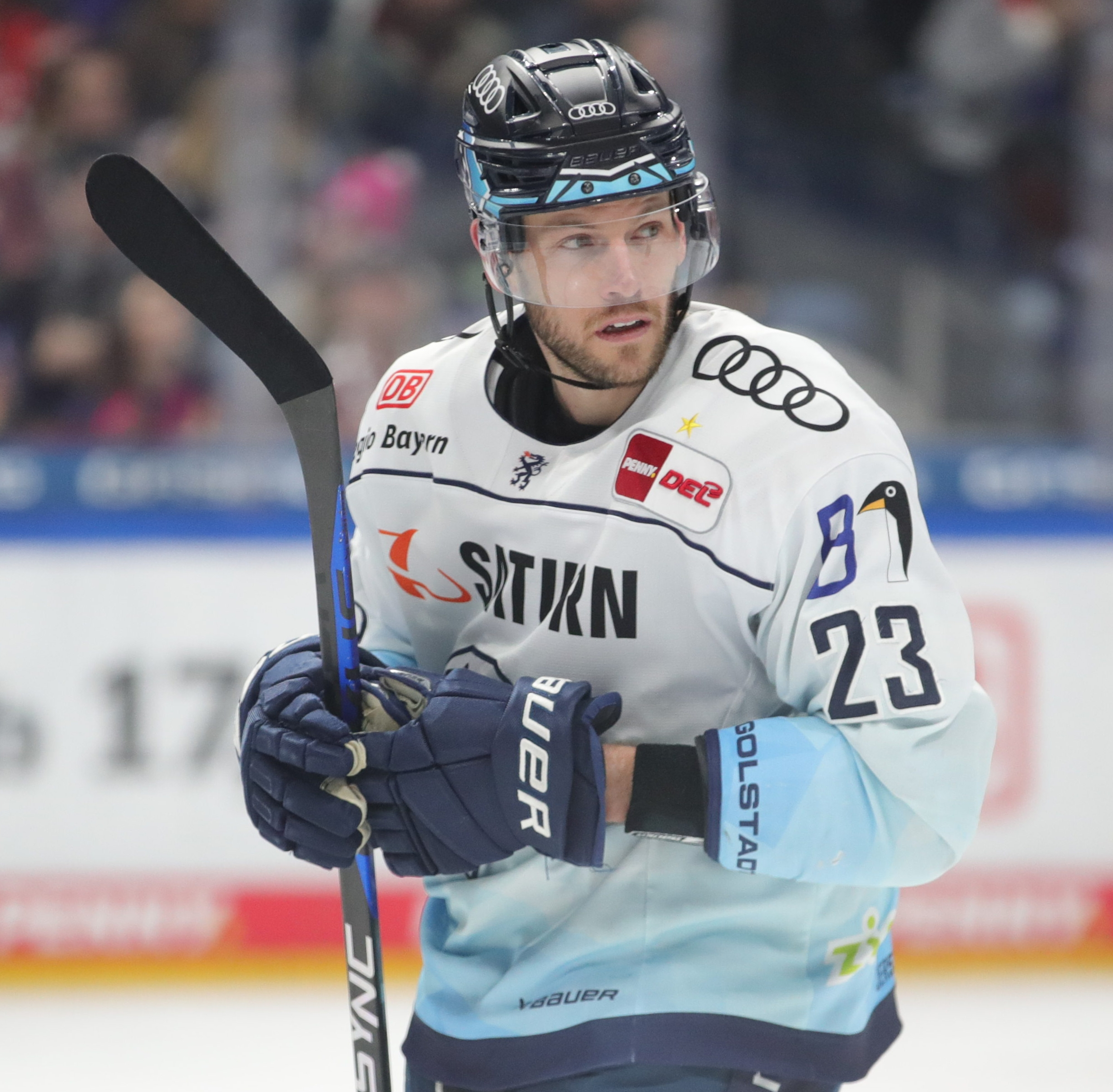
- Born: March 16, 1987 (age 38) Rocky Rapids, Alberta, Canada
- Height: 5 ft 11 in (180 cm)
- Weight: 174 lb (79 kg; 12 st 6 lb)
- Position: Defence
- Shoots: Right
- DEL team Former teams: ERC Ingolstadt; Providence Bruins; Lake Erie Monsters; Peoria Rivermen; Rochester Americans; Straubing Tigers; Kölner Haie
- NHL draft: Undrafted
- Playing career: 2011–present

Maury Edwards (born March 16, 1987) is a Canadian professional ice hockey defenceman who is currently playing for ERC Ingolstadt in the Deutsche Eishockey Liga (DEL).

== Playing career ==
Before turning professional, Edwards attended the University of Massachusetts Lowell where he played four seasons with the UMass Lowell River Hawks men's ice hockey team which competes in NCAA's Division I in the Hockey East conference.

During the 2012–13 season, Edwards was traded by the Cyclones to the Florida Everblades in exchange for Taylor Ellington on January 2, 2013.

On August 9, 2013, Edwards left North America and signed a one-year deal as a free agent with second tier German club, ESV Kaufbeuren. After a solitary season fighting relegation in the inaugural DEL2, Edwards left Kaufbeuren for the Ravensburg Towerstars after the year on April 24, 2014.

In the following 2014–15 season, Edwards continued his prolific scoring pace from the blueline, helping the Towerstars reach the postseason with 51 points in 49 games to be named as the DEL2 defenseman of the year. Edwards performance attracted interest from the top tier German league and on March 26, 2015, he signed a one-year contract with the Straubing Tigers.

Edwards played three seasons in Straubing before leaving as a free agent following the 2017–18 campaign. On April 19, 2018, he agreed to continue in the DEL, joining ERC Ingolstadt on a one-year contract.

On March 20, 2020, Edwards joined his third DEL club as a free agent, agreeing to a two-year contract with Kölner Haie.

After his contract with Kölner Haie, Edwards returned as a free agent to his former club, ERC Ingolstadt, signing a one-year contract on May 15, 2022.

== Career statistics ==
			Regular season					Playoffs
Season	Team	League	GP	G	A	Pts	PIM	GP	G	A	Pts	PIM
2005–06	Alberni Valley Bulldogs	BCHL	57	10	27	37	15	10	2	8	10	6
2006–07	Alberni Valley Bulldogs	BCHL	53	14	31	45	62	5	0	1	1	0
2007–08	UMass Lowell	HE	37	8	11	19	12	—	—	—	—	—
2008–09	UMass Lowell	HE	38	11	18	29	32	—	—	—	—	—
2009–10	UMass Lowell	HE	38	4	11	15	29	—	—	—	—	—
2010–11	UMass Lowell	HE	34	5	11	16	33	—	—	—	—	—
2010–11	Providence Bruins	AHL	3	0	0	0	2	—	—	—	—	—
2010–11	Lake Erie Monsters	AHL	6	1	1	2	4	—	—	—	—	—
2011–12	Cincinnati Cyclones	ECHL	62	7	23	30	14	—	—	—	—	—
2011–12	Peoria Rivermen	AHL	3	0	0	0	0	—	—	—	—	—
2011–12	Rochester Americans	AHL	1	0	0	0	0	—	—	—	—	—
2012–13	Cincinnati Cyclones	ECHL	24	2	5	7	10	—	—	—	—	—
2012–13	Florida Everblades	ECHL	40	3	13	16	18	13	1	3	4	4
2013–14	ESV Kaufbeuren	DEL2	54	16	24	40	79	—	—	—	—	—
2014–15	Ravensburg Towerstars	DEL2	49	15	36	51	78	4	0	2	2	0
2015–16	Straubing Tigers	DEL	49	9	20	29	65	7	3	2	5	4
2016–17	Straubing Tigers	DEL	52	9	19	28	18	2	0	0	0	0
2017–18	Straubing Tigers	DEL	49	6	11	17	12	—	—	—	—	—
2018–19	ERC Ingolstadt	DEL	51	12	26	38	16	7	1	4	5	24
2019–20	ERC Ingolstadt	DEL	52	15	31	46	24	—	—	—	—	—
2020–21	Kölner Haie	DEL	18	1	15	16	8	—	—	—	—	—
2021–22	Kölner Haie	DEL	55	7	17	24	58	4	0	1	1	2
2022–23	ERC Ingolstadt	DEL	56	7	21	28	14	16	2	4	6	8
2023–24	ERC Ingolstadt	DEL	52	7	15	22	12	7	2	4	6	4
AHL totals			13	1	1	2	6	—	—	—	—	—
DEL totals			434	73	175	248	227	43	8	15	23	42

Medal record

Ice hockey

Representing Canada West

World Junior A Challenge
Gold medal – first place	2006 Yorkton	

== Awards and honours ==
Award	Year
College
All-Hockey East Rookie Team	2007–08
All-Hockey East First Team	2008–09
AHCA East Second-Team All-American	2008–09
Hockey East All-Tournament Team	2009
DEL2
Defenseman of the Year	2014–15
DEL
Defenseman of the Year	2019–20
