= Stéphane Da Costa =

French ice hockey player (born 1989)

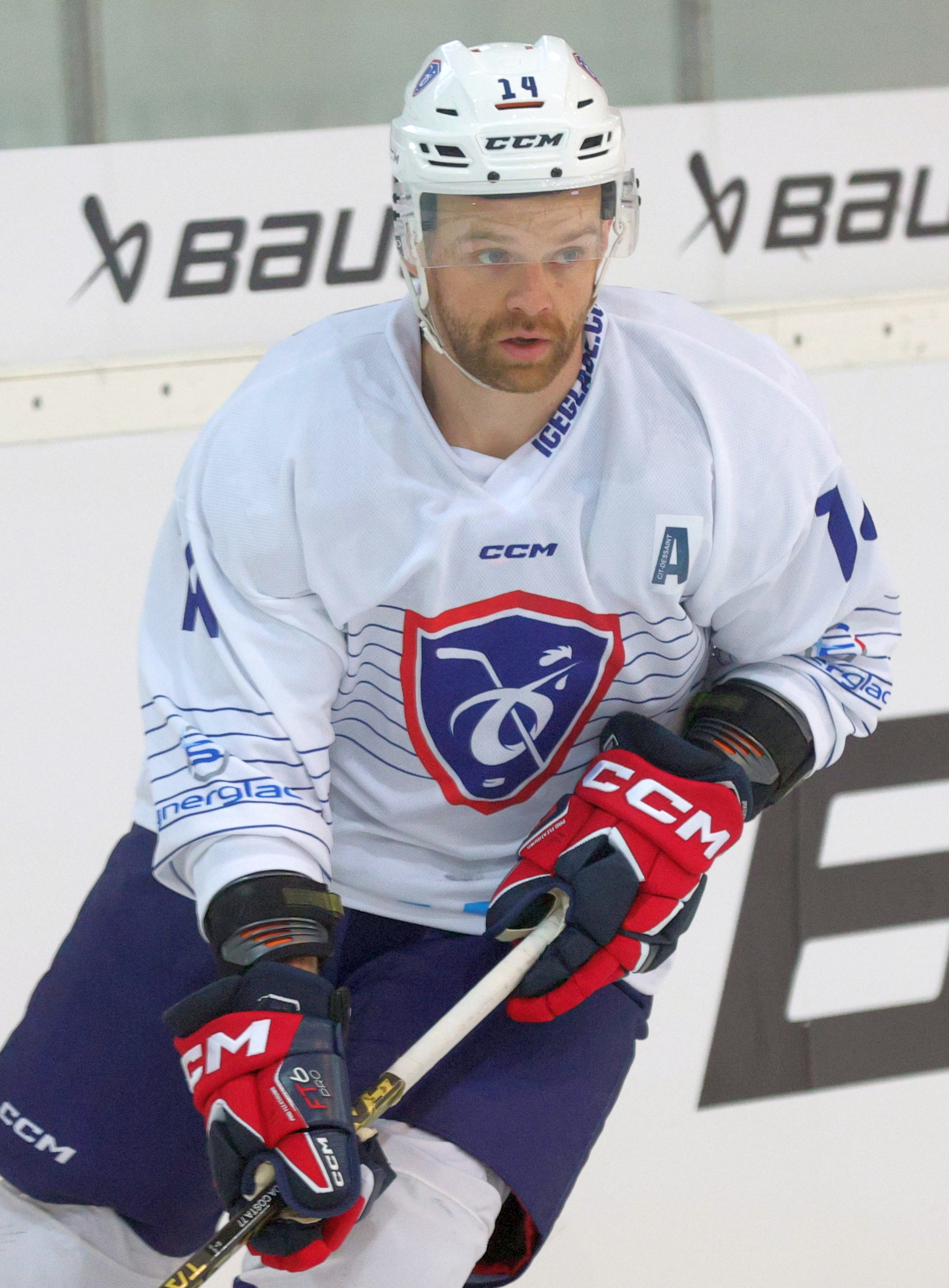
- Da Costa with France in 2024
- Born: 11 July 1989 (age 37) Paris, France
- Height: 5 ft 11 in (180 cm)
- Weight: 179 lb (81 kg; 12 st 11 lb)
- Position: Centre
- Shoots: Right
- KHL team Former teams: Dinamo Minsk; Ottawa Senators; CSKA Moscow; Genève-Servette HC; Avtomobilist Yekaterinburg; Lokomotiv Yaroslavl; Ak Bars Kazan
- National team: France
- NHL draft: Undrafted
- Playing career: 2011–present

Stéphane Da Costa (born 11 July 1989) is a French professional ice hockey centre for Dinamo Minsk of the Kontinental Hockey League (KHL). Born in France, Da Costa moved to the United States as a junior to develop as a player. After junior, Da Costa moved on to NCAA collegiate hockey, playing two seasons with Merrimack College. He then signed as a free agent with the National Hockey League (NHL)'s Ottawa Senators in 2011, and played three seasons in the organization, including 47 games with Ottawa. In 2014, he left the organization as a free agent, signing with CSKA Moscow.

He has represented France in both the IIHF World Championships and Olympics.

== Playing career ==
=== Amateur ===
Da Costa moved from his native country of France to the U.S. to play junior hockey for the Texas Tornado of the North American Hockey League (NAHL) at the age of 17, not yet able to speak English fluently. With the Tornado in 2006–07, Da Costa had 23 goals and 40 points in 50 games, tied for third in team scoring.

Da Costa then transitioned to the United States Hockey League (USHL) in 2007–08, joining the Sioux City Musketeers. In his first season with the team, Da Costa had 12 goals and 37 points in 51 games, helping the team qualify for the playoffs. In four post-season games, Da Costa had a goal and three points.

He returned to the USHL's Musketeers for a second season in 2008–09, leading the team in scoring with 31 goals and 67 points in 48 games. Sioux City, however, failed to qualify for the post-season.

Da Costa joined the Merrimack College Warriors of the NCAA's Hockey East conference in North Andover, Massachusetts, for the 2009–10 season. Going on to have a great freshman campaign. In the second game of his freshman season, Da Costa scored five goals against the United States Military Academy team. He would go on to have 15 multi point games. Finishing the season with 16 goals and 45 points in 34 games leading all rookies in scoring. After the season, Da Costa won the National Rookie of the Year, USCHO Rookie of the Year, Inside College Hockey Rookie of the Year, College Hockey News Rookie of the Year, and Hockey East Rookie of the Year honours.

After receiving numerous offers from NHL teams to sign as a free agent, Da Costa opted to return to Merrimack for a second season in 2010–11. He once again led the team in scoring with 14 goals and 45 points in 33 games, missing multiple games in February due to a knee injury. Still Costa would help lead the warriors to the hockey east championship game and eventually the NCAA tournament. He would later be honored as a ACHA All American at the end of the season.

Da Costa would be named to the Hockey East 35TH Anniversary Team in 2019.

In 2024 Da Costa was inducted into the Merrimack Athletics Hall of Fame.

=== Professional ===
On 30 March 2011, Da Costa signed as an undrafted free agent with the Ottawa Senators of the NHL. He made his NHL debut in the 2010–11 season, appearing in four games with the Senators and registering no points. His first NHL game was on 2 April 2011, against the rival Toronto Maple Leafs. Da Costa became just the sixth player born in France to play in the NHL, joining Cristobal Huet, Philippe Bozon, Pat Daley, Paul MacLean and André Peloffy, and the third French-born and -trained NHL player (along with Bozon and Huet and before Antoine Roussel, Pierre-Édouard Bellemare, and Yohann Auvitu).

After an impressive training camp to start the 2011–12 season, Da Costa made the Senators' opening night roster and joined the team for their first game. He registered his first NHL point on 8 October in his second game of the season, a goal in a 6–5 loss to the Maple Leafs against goaltender James Reimer. After scoring three goals and five points in 22 games in Ottawa, Da Costa was reassigned to their American Hockey League (AHL) affiliate, the Binghamton Senators, on 27 November 2011. In Binghamton, Da Costa registered 13 goals and 36 points in 46 games, including his first professional hat-trick on 26 December 2011, in an 8–3 Binghamton victory over the Albany Devils.

On 25 July 2012, the Senators announced that they had re-signed Da Costa to a one-year, two-way contract extension. The deal would pay $800,000 if he played in Ottawa, and $80,000 if he returned to Binghamton for a second season. The 2012–13 NHL lockout forced Da Costa to begin the season in Binghamton, where he recorded nine goals and 15 assists in his first 31 games. He was recalled to Ottawa on 3 February 2013, following two straight losses by the Senators.

On 12 July 2014, Da Costa left North America and signed as a free agent to a one-year contract with CSKA Moscow of the KHL. During the 2014-15 season Da Costa would score 30 goals and 32 assists in just 46 appearances helping lead Moscow to the Russian Championship.

On 14 October 2017, Da Costa joined Genève-Servette HC of the National League on a one-year deal worth CHF 800,000. Scoring 22 goals and 26 assists in 58 games during the 2018–19 season.

Returning to the KHL for the 2018–19 season with the Russian club, Avtomobilist Yekaterinburg, Da Costa posted 22 goals and 48 points in 58 games. As a free agent after the season, Da Costa opted to continue in the KHL by signing a one-year deal with Lokomotiv Yaroslavl on May 1, 2019. In the following 2019–20 season, Da Costa continued to play in a leading offensive role, posting 14 goals and 35 points in 58 games.

Da Costa left Lokomotiv after his contract, joining AK Bars Kazan on a one-year contract on May 6, 2020. Following a lone season with Ak Bars in 2020–21, in which he led the club in scoring with 27 goals, 30 assists and 57 points in just 52 games. He would also be named forward of the month in December, as well as finishing 5th in the entire league in points. Da Costa returned to his former club, Avtomobilist Yekaterinburg, as a free agent in agreeing to a two-year contract on 21 May 2021.

During the 2021-22 season, Da Costa would only appear in 40 games but would still have a 30-point season. The following, though, he would lead the team with 20 goals and 36 assists in 54 appearances. He would also finish 4th in the league in total points, regaining his spot as one of the top players in the KHL. He would continue this success, leading the team in points the following year with 54 in 60 appearances. Then, for a third consecutive year, he would lead his team in points with 14 goals and 43 assists in 66 games during the 2024-25 season. Da Costa would also become the 14th player in KHL history to reach the 200-goal mark and the first-ever Frenchman to achieve this milestone.

== International play ==
Da Costa plays his international hockey with France, and played in his first international tournament at the 2008 World Junior Ice Hockey Championships – Division I held in Bad Tölz, Germany. In five games with France, Da Costa had five goals and 10 points. France, however, finished with a 1–4–0 record. Da Costa returned for the 2009 World Junior Ice Hockey Championships - Division I held in Herisau, Switzerland, scoring four goals and 13 points in five games and helping France to a 3–2–0 tournament record.

Da Costa also played for France at the 2009 IIHF World Championship held in Bern and Kloten, Switzerland, where he had two assists in six games, as France finished in 12th place. Da Costa was once again named to France for the 2010 IIHF World Championship held in Cologne, Mannheim and Gelsenkirchen, Germany, scoring one goal and three points in five games, though France fell to 14th place. In the 2011 IIHF World Championship held in Bratislava and Košice, Slovakia, Da Costa was held to just one assist in five games as France finished in 12th place.

Da Costa once again suited up for France at the 2012 IIHF World Championship, scoring a goal and six points in seven games in France's best finish at the Worlds since 1995, ninth place. Da Costa scored the insurance goal for France in a key 4–2 upset of Switzerland.

In the 2014 IIHF World Championship opener for France on 9 May, Da Costa scored two goals in a 3–2 shoot-out victory over Canada, a major upset victory. Da Costa would score twice again in France's 6–2 defeat of Denmark, marking the team's first qualification to the World Championship quarter-finals since 1995.

The Russian invasion of Ukraine prevented him from joining the French national team for two years before the Sports Ministry gave its agreement in April 2024. In 2025 Da Costa helped France qualify for the 2026 Winter Olympics for the first time since 2002.

Da Costa has also served as both the team's captain and as an alternate captain during his tenure.

== Personal ==
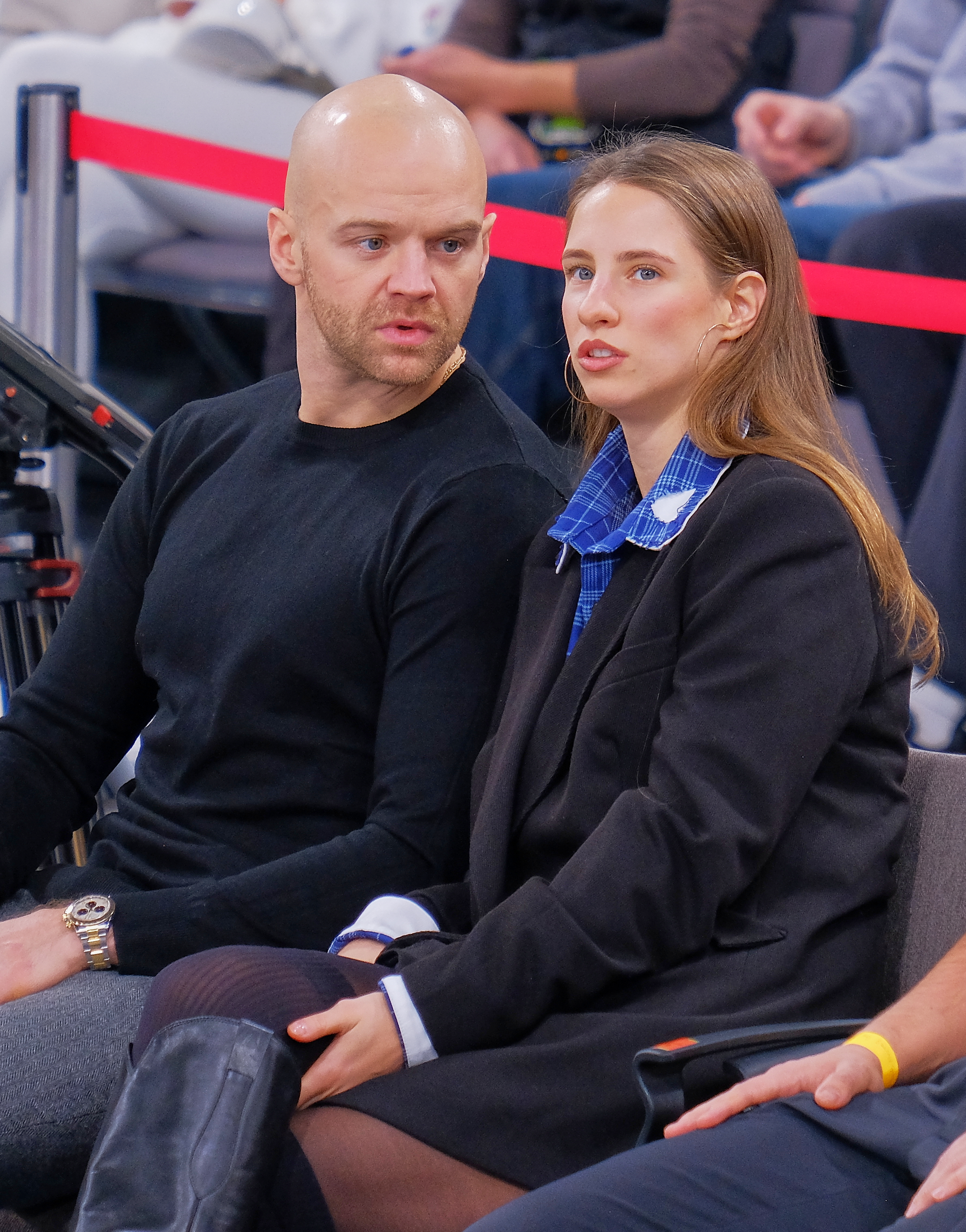
Da Costa in 2024 with Kseniia Levchenko at a basketball game

A native of Paris, Da Costa is the son of a Portuguese–French father and Polish mother. His two brothers, Teddy and Gabriel, also play hockey, competing in the Finnish Mestis and French Ligue Magnus, respectively.

Da Costa is currently in a relationship with Russian basketball player Kseniia Levchenko, whom he met when he attended a women's basketball game in Yekaterinburg and asked her for a jersey for his niece. He has two children from a previous marriage.

== Career statistics ==
=== Regular season and playoffs ===
			Regular season					Playoffs
Season	Team	League	GP	G	A	Pts	PIM	GP	G	A	Pts	PIM
2004–05	OHC Paris–Viry	FRA U18	9	11	3	14	10	6	14	1	15	24
2005–06	Gothiques d'Amiens	FRA U18	9	15	8	23	34	—	—	—	—	—
2005–06	Gothiques d'Amiens	FRA U20	1	0	0	0	0	—	—	—	—	—
2006–07	Texas Tornado	NAHL	50	23	17	40	31	10	4	3	7	6
2007–08	Sioux City Musketeers	USHL	51	12	24	36	22	4	1	2	3	8
2008–09	Sioux City Musketeers	USHL	48	31	36	67	23	—	—	—	—	—
2009–10	Merrimack College	HE	34	16	29	45	41	—	—	—	—	—
2010–11	Merrimack College	HE	33	14	31	45	42	—	—	—	—	—
2010–11	Ottawa Senators	NHL	4	0	0	0	0	—	—	—	—	—
2011–12	Ottawa Senators	NHL	22	3	2	5	8	—	—	—	—	—
2011–12	Binghamton Senators	AHL	46	13	23	36	12	—	—	—	—	—
2012–13	Binghamton Senators	AHL	57	13	25	38	26	3	0	1	1	0
2012–13	Ottawa Senators	NHL	9	1	1	2	0	—	—	—	—	—
2013–14	Ottawa Senators	NHL	12	3	1	4	2	—	—	—	—	—
2013–14	Binghamton Senators	AHL	56	18	40	58	32	4	2	2	4	4
2014–15	CSKA Moscow	KHL	46	30	32	62	12	11	4	4	8	8
2015–16	CSKA Moscow	KHL	24	7	7	14	14	18	7	5	12	6
2016–17	CSKA Moscow	KHL	24	9	11	20	10	10	4	4	8	2
2017–18	Genève–Servette HC	NL	28	8	17	25	6	5	2	2	4	2
2018–19	Avtomobilist Yekaterinburg	KHL	58	22	26	48	51	8	1	2	3	50
2019–20	Lokomotiv Yaroslavl	KHL	58	14	21	35	14	6	3	2	5	6
2020–21	Ak Bars Kazan	KHL	52	27	30	57	24	10	1	3	4	6
2021–22	Avtomobilist Yekaterinburg	KHL	40	14	16	30	16	—	—	—	—	—
2022–23	Avtomobilist Yekaterinburg	KHL	54	20	36	56	42	7	1	6	7	2
2023–24	Avtomobilist Yekaterinburg	KHL	60	18	36	54	30	12	6	4	10	2
2024–25	Avtomobilist Yekaterinburg	KHL	66	14	43	57	31	7	1	3	4	0
2025–26	Avtomobilist Yekaterinburg	KHL	50	15	29	44	12	6	0	2	2	4
NHL totals			47	7	4	11	10	—	—	—	—	—
KHL totals			532	190	287	477	256	95	28	35	63	86

=== International ===
Year	Team	Event	Result	GP	G	A	Pts	PIM
2006	France	WJC18 D1	DNQ	5	3	6	9	2
2008	France	WJC D1	DNQ	5	5	5	10	8
2009	France	WJC D1	DNQ	5	4	9	13	4
2009	France	WC	12th	6	0	2	2	0
2010	France	WC	14th	5	1	2	3	14
2011	France	WC	12th	5	0	1	1	6
2012	France	WC	9th	7	1	5	6	4
2014	France	WC	8th	8	6	3	9	6
2015	France	WC	12th	4	1	2	3	2
2016	France	OGQ	DNQ	3	1	1	2	10
2017	France	WC	9th	6	6	4	10	2
2018	France	WC	12th	5	1	4	5	2
2021	France	OGQ	DNQ	3	1	2	3	4
2024	France	WC	14th	3	2	2	4	0
2024	France	OGQ	Q	3	2	3	5	4
2026	France	OG	11th	4	0	1	1	2
Junior totals				15	12	20	32	14
Senior totals				62	22	32	54	56

== Awards and honours ==
Award	Year
College
All-Hockey East Rookie Team	2009–10
Merrimack Rookie of the year	2009–10
Hockey East Rookie of the year	2009–10
Merrimack team MVP	2009–10, 2010–11
Tim Taylor Award	2009–10
All-Hockey East Second Team	2009–10, 2010–11
AHCA East Second-Team All-American	2010–11
Hockey East 35TH Anniversary Team	2019
Merrimack Athletics Hall of Fame	2024
KHL
Russian championship	2014-15
Played in the KHL all star game 3x	2016, 2019, 2020
Opening Cup	2020-21
Forward of the Month	December 2020

Awards and achievements
Preceded by Kieran Millan	Hockey East Rookie of the Year; 2009–10	Succeeded by Charlie Coyle
Preceded by Kieran Millan	NCAA Ice Hockey National Rookie of the Year; 2009–10	Succeeded by T. J. Tynan
