= Boston University–Maine men's ice hockey rivalry =

College sports rivalry

- Boston University Maine
- First meeting: November 20, 1979
- Latest meeting: October 31, 2026; BU 3, Maine 2
- Next meeting: February 5, 2027
- Stadiums: Alfond Arena (Maine); Agganis Arena (BU)

Statistics
- Total meetings: 152
- All-time series: Boston University leads 76–60–16
- Largest victory: November 16, 1991; Maine 8, BU 1 November 15, 2013; Maine 7, BU 0 November 18, 2017; BU 7, Maine 0 March 5, 2022; Maine 8, BU 1
- Longest win streak: BU, 13 (January 16, 1982 – October 31, 1986)
- Longest unbeaten streak: BU, 13 (January 16, 1982 – October 31, 1986 & November 6, 2005 – March 14, 2009)
- Current win streak: Boston University, 3
- Current unbeaten streak: Boston University, 3

The Boston University–Maine men's ice hockey rivalry is a college hockey rivalry between the Boston University Terriers and the Maine Black Bears in the Hockey East conference. The rivalry was born out of fierce on-ice competition between the two schools, especially in the 1990s and early 2000s, as the two schools were routinely at the top of the Hockey East standings and battled each other for conference supremacy.

== History ==
In the early years of Maine's program, the rivalry was one-sided and had not yet truly formed, as Boston University dominated Maine on the ice, defeating them 13 consecutive times between 1982 and 1986, one of the worst losing streaks to a single opponent in Maine's history. Once legendary Black Bears coach Shawn Walsh took over the program, however, the tides started to turn, and Maine began to make up ground. One notable meeting between the teams occurred on February 19, 1993, at Alfond Arena in Orono, home of the Black Bears. Maine was in the midst of an unprecedentedly successful season, having entered that contest with a record of 30-0-2. Midway through the third period, Maine was leading by a score of 6-2, and it appeared they would cruise to another easy victory. However, the Terriers would rally, and manage to score four unanswered third period goals to tie the game at 6-6 and send it to overtime. In the overtime period, Terriers forward Mike Prendergast would get a breakaway from center ice and proceed to score the game-winning goal for the Terriers, giving them a stunning 7-6 victory and handing Maine their first loss of the season. Prendergast would say after the game, "My sister could have scored that goal" to taunt the Maine players and fans. However, this would end up as Maine's only loss the entire season, as they would not lose another game all season and win their first national title with a stunning 42-1-2 record, including defeating the Terriers twice more by a combined score of 11-3. Boston University would have their revenge, however, winning a national championship of their own in 1995, defeating Maine in the national title game 6-2. The on-ice rivalry between the schools was often overshadowed by the personal rivalry between the coaches, Walsh for Maine and BU's own legendary coach Jack Parker. Both men were impassioned and bombastic coaches, and as such drew the ire of each other and of opposing fans. While they often had choice words for each other during their coaching careers, Parker spoke kindly of Walsh during his cancer treatment and following his 2001 death. While some fans view Boston College and New Hampshire as BU and Maine's historical and primary rivals, respectively, fans from the heat of the rivalry in the 1990s and early 2000s may report that in their opinion, either Maine or BU is their schools true rival, not UNH or BC. Even after Walsh's 2001 death, the rivalry has remained heated and competitive, meeting in the Hockey East playoff tournament in 2002, 2004, 2009, 2010, 2012, and 2024, with Maine winning each matchup aside from 2009 and 2024. The two teams also met in the NCAA National Tournament in 2002, with Maine emerging victorious. On January 24, 2004, the two teams combined for 268 penalty minutes in one game, a men's college hockey record that stands to this day, and stood as the all-levels, both genders record until 2013. The majority of the penalty minutes were accrued during a brawl at the end of the game, which was a 1-0 victory for Boston University. Even as Maine's team performance has declined in the latter part of the 2010s, games between the teams remain tense, chippy affairs, and simultaneous success for the teams would lead to a rejuvenation of the once-heated rivalry.

== Game Results ==
As of November 1, 2026

Maine victories	Boston University victories

No.	Date	Location	Winner	Score
1	November 20, 1979	Boston, MA	Boston University	5–3
2	February 19, 1980	Orono, ME	Maine	8–7
3	December 13, 1980	Orono, ME	Maine	5–4
4	January 21, 1981	Boston, MA	Boston University	3–0
5	December 12, 1981	Boston, MA	Maine	6–5
6	January 16, 1982	Orono, ME	Boston University	7–1
7	December 11, 1982	Orono, ME	Boston University	5–2
8	February 1, 1983	Boston, MA	Boston University	6–2
9	December 10, 1983	Orono, ME	Boston University	3–2 (OT)
10	February 3, 1984	Boston, MA	Boston University	6–2
11	January 20, 1985	Orono, ME	Boston University	6–4
12	February 15, 1985	Boston, MA	Boston University	7–4
13	February 16, 1985	Boston, MA	Boston University	7–2
14	March 9, 1985	Boston, MA†	Boston University	7–4
15	March 10, 1985	Boston, MA†	Boston University	4–2
16	December 1, 1985	Boston, MA	Boston University	4–1
17	February 14, 1986	Orono, ME	Boston University	3–2
18	February 15, 1986	Orono, ME	Boston University	6–3
19	October 31, 1986	Boston, MA	Maine	3–2
20	November 1, 1986	Boston, MA	Maine	7–5
21	February 27, 1987	Orono, ME	Maine	6–3
22	February 28, 1987	Orono, ME	Maine	4–2
23	November 14, 1987	Orono, ME	Maine	7–5
24	December 4, 1987	Boston, MA	Maine	6–2
25	December 5, 1987	Boston, MA	Maine	7–1
26	November 29, 1988	Boston, MA	Maine	8–4
27	February 24, 1989	Orono, ME	Maine	8–4
28	February 25, 1989	Orono, ME	Maine	5–3
29	December 10, 1989	Boston, MA	Maine	3–2 (OT)
30	December 11, 1989	Boston, MA	Boston University	3–2 (OT)
31	February 24, 1990	Orono, ME	Maine	5–2
32	March 9, 1990	Orono, ME†	Maine	3–1
33	December 2, 1990	Boston, MA	Boston University	7–4
34	January 25, 1991	Orono, ME	Maine	4–2
35	January 26, 1991	Orono, ME	Maine	4–0
36	March 10, 1991	Boston, MA††	Boston University	4–3 (OT)
37	November 15, 1991	Boston, MA	Boston University	5–4
38	November 16, 1991	Boston, MA	Maine	8–1
39	January 31, 1992	Orono, ME	Tie	4–4
40	November 20, 1992	Boston, MA	Maine	4–3
41	November 21, 1992	Boston, MA	Maine	6–3
42	February 19, 1993	Orono, ME	Boston University	7–6 (OT)
43	February 20, 1993	Orono, ME	Maine	6–1
44	March 20, 1993	Boston, MA††	Maine	5–2
45	November 19, 1993	Orono, ME	Boston University	5–3
46	November 20, 1993	Orono, ME	Maine	5–1
47	February 19, 1994	Boston, MA	Tie	0–0
48	February 20, 1994	Boston, MA	Boston University	5–1
49	March 11, 1994	Boston, MA†	Boston University	8–5
50	March 12, 1994	Boston, MA†	Boston University	4–3
51	October 30, 1994	Boston, MA	Tie	3–3
52	November 27, 1994	Inglewood, CA	Maine	6–5 (OT)
53	December 2, 1994	Orono, ME	Maine	6–5
54	December 3, 1994	Orono, ME	Tie	5–5
55	April 1, 1995	Providence, RI††††	Boston University	6–2
56	November 14, 1995	Boston, MA	Boston University	5–2
57	January 19, 1996	Boston, MA	Boston University	4–3
58	November 20, 1996	Boston, MA	Tie	3–3
59	January 25, 1997	Boston, MA	Maine	3–1
60	February 21, 1997	Orono, ME	Maine	3–0
61	February 22, 1997	Orono, ME	Maine	7–2
62	November 8, 1997	Orono, ME	Boston University	6–0
63	January 23, 1998	Boston, MA	Boston University	4–3
64	January 24, 1998	Boston, MA	Boston University	3–2
65	January 5, 1999	Boston, MA	Maine	4–3
66	February 19, 1999	Orono, ME	Maine	7–2
67	February 20, 1999	Orono, ME	Boston University	4–1
68	December 10, 1999	Orono, ME	Maine	4–2
69	January 15, 2000	Boston, MA	Boston University	5–4
70	January 16, 2000	Boston, MA	Tie	3–3
71	March 17, 2000	Boston, MA†	Maine	4–2
72	December 8, 2000	Boston, MA	Boston University	3–2
73	January 12, 2001	Orono, ME	Tie	3–3
74	January 13, 2001	Orono, ME	Maine	3–1
75	November 9, 2001	Orono, ME	Boston University	3–2 (OT)
76	March 1, 2002	Boston, MA	Maine	9–6
77	March 2, 2002	Boston, MA	Tie	4–4

No.	Date	Location	Winner	Score
78	March 15, 2002	Boston, MA†	Maine	4–3
79	March 24, 2002	Worcester, MA†††	Maine	4–2
80	November 16, 2002	Boston, MA	Maine	7–3
81	February 28, 2003	Orono, ME	Boston University	4–2
82	March 1, 2003	Orono, ME	Maine	4–2
83	November 1, 2003	Orono, ME	Maine	2–1
84	January 23, 2004	Boston, MA	Maine	8–4
85	January 24, 2004	Boston, MA	Boston University	1–0
86	March 19, 2004	Boston, MA†	Maine	1–0
87	October 31, 2004	Boston, MA	Boston University	2–1
88	January 21, 2005	Orono, ME	Tie	1–1
89	January 22, 2005	Orono, ME	Maine	4–2
90	November 6, 2005	Orono, ME	Boston University	2–1
91	January 13, 2006	Boston, MA	Boston University	3–2
92	January 14, 2006	Boston, MA	Boston University	5–4
93	November 4, 2006	Boston, MA	Tie	2–2
94	January 12, 2007	Orono, ME	Boston University	6–5
95	January 13, 2007	Orono, ME	Boston University	3–0
96	January 12, 2008	Orono, ME	Boston University	3–1
97	February 15, 2008	Boston, MA	Boston University	2–1 (OT)
98	February 16, 2008	Boston, MA	Boston University	1–0 (OT)
99	January 10, 2009	Boston, MA	Boston University	4–1
100	February 13, 2009	Orono, ME	Boston University	7–2
101	February 14, 2009	Orono, ME	Tie	2–2
102	March 13, 2009	Boston, MA†	Boston University	2–1
103	March 14, 2009	Boston, MA†	Maine	6–3
104	March 15, 2009	Boston, MA†	Boston University	6–2
105	November 8, 2009	Orono, ME	Maine	3–2
106	February 12, 2010	Boston, MA	Boston University	7–4
107	February 13, 2010	Boston, MA	Boston University	5–2
108	March 19, 2010	Boston, MA†	Maine	5–2
109	November 6, 2010	Boston, MA	Tie	2–2
110	January 28, 2011	Orono, ME	Boston University	4–3
111	January 29, 2011	Orono, ME	Tie	1–1
112	December 10, 2011	Orono, ME	Boston University	5–1
113	January 27, 2012	Boston, MA	Maine	4–2
114	January 28, 2012	Boston, MA	Maine	3–1
115	March 16, 2012	Boston, MA†	Maine	5–3
116	December 8, 2012	Boston, MA	Boston University	1–0
117	February 15, 2013	Orono, ME	Tie	3–3
118	February 16, 2013	Orono, ME	Boston University	5–4 (OT)
119	November 15, 2013	Orono, ME	Maine	7–0
120	January 11, 2014	Boston, MA	Maine	7–3
121	November 14, 2014	Orono, ME	Boston University	3–1
122	November 21, 2014	Boston, MA	Boston University	3–2 (OT)
123	January 22, 2016	Orono, ME	Boston University	5–2
124	January 23, 2016	Boston, MA	Boston University	6–1
125	January 20, 2017	Boston, MA	Boston University	4–1
126	January 21, 2017	Orono, ME	Boston University	3–1
127	November 17, 2017	Orono, ME	Maine	5–2
128	November 18, 2017	Portland, ME	Boston University	7–0
129	January 6, 2018	Boston, MA	Maine	3–0
130	November 16, 2018	Boston, MA	Boston University	3–2
131	November 17, 2018	Boston, MA	Maine	3–1
132	March 9, 2019	Orono, ME	Maine	6–0
133	November 1, 2019	Orono, ME	Maine	4–2
134	November 2, 2019	Orono, ME	Tie	2–2
135	January 22, 2021	Boston, MA	Boston University	3–2 (OT)
136	January 23, 2021	Boston, MA	Boston University	5–1
137	February 4, 2022	Boston, MA	Boston University	4–0
138	March 4, 2022	Orono, ME	Boston University	5–1
139	March 5, 2022	Orono, ME	Maine	8–1
140	January 20, 2023	Boston, MA	Boston University	5–1
141	January 21, 2023	Boston, MA	Boston University	9–6
142	February 3, 2023	Orono, ME	Boston University	5–3
143	November 17, 2023	Boston, MA	Boston University	3–2
144	November 18, 2023	Boston, MA	Boston University	5–4
145	March 22, 2024	Boston, MA†	Boston University	4–1
146	November 15, 2024	Orono, ME	Maine	5–2
147	November 16, 2024	Orono, ME	Tie	2–2
148	October 31, 2025	Orono, ME	Maine	5–4 (OT)
149	November 1, 2025	Orono, ME	Maine	8–5
150	February 6, 2026	Boston, MA	Boston University	3–2 (OT)
151	October 30, 2026	Boston, MA	Boston University	7–2
152	October 31, 2026	Boston, MA	Boston University	3–2 (OT)
Series: Boston University leads 76–60–16

† Hockey East Tournament
†† Hockey East Championship Game
††† NCAA Tournament
†††† NCAA National Championship Game

=== Results by decade ===
Decade	Series
1970s	Boston University, 1–0–0
1980s	Boston University, 15–14–0
1990s	Maine, 18–15–5
2000s	Boston University, 18–13–6
2010s	Boston University, 14–11–4
2020s	Boston University, 13–4–1
