= Tanner House (ice hockey) =

Canadian ice hockey player (born 1986)

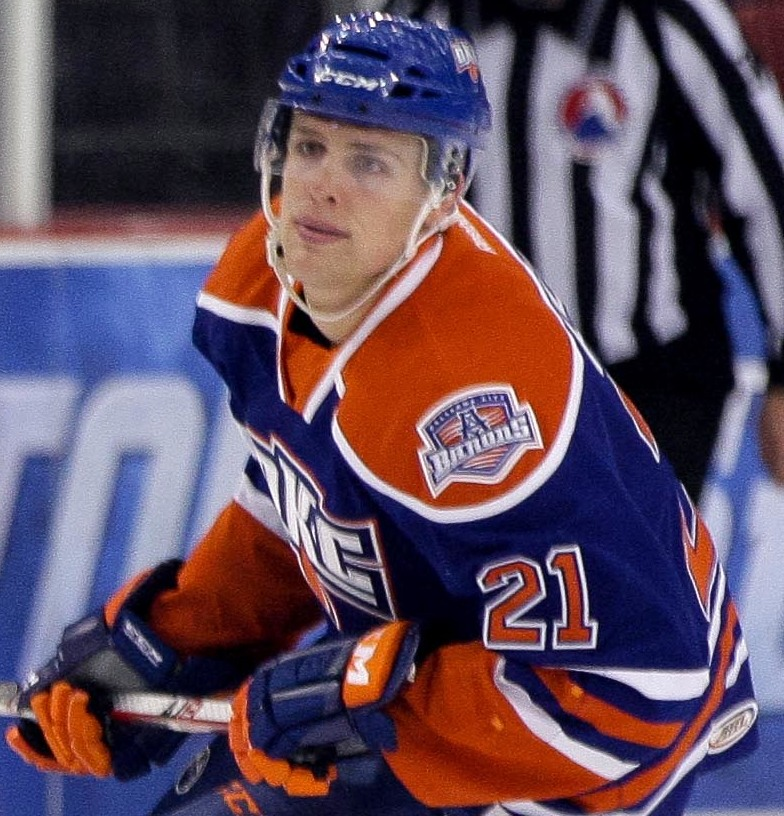
- House with the Oklahoma City Barons in 2012
- Born: April 27, 1986 (age 40) Cochrane, Alberta, Canada
- Height: 6 ft 1 in (185 cm)
- Weight: 195 lb (88 kg; 13 st 13 lb)
- Position: Centre
- Shot: Right
- Played for: Oklahoma City Barons
- NHL draft: Undrafted
- Playing career: 2011–2013

Tanner House (born April 27, 1986) is a retired Canadian professional ice hockey player who spent his entire three-season career in the American Hockey League (AHL) with the Oklahoma City Barons.

== Playing career ==
After spending his junior hockey years with the Canmore Eagles and Penticton Vees, and completing four seasons with the Maine Black Bears, House signed a two-year deal with the Edmonton Oilers on March 19, 2011. He had served as team captain during his final two seasons at Maine and earned accolades including the Hockey East Best Defensive Forward award and the Dean Smith Award, which honours the University of Maine's top male student-athlete.

After signing his contract with the Oilers, House joined their American Hockey League (AHL) affiliate, the Oklahoma City Barons, on an Amateur Tryout (ATO) agreement. He made his debut during the final stretch of the Barons' 2010–11 season, appearing in the last six regular-season games. Despite the limited time, House made an immediate impact, contributing one goal and four assists.

After failing to secure a spot on the Oilers' roster out of training camp, House spent the entire 2011-12 season with the Barons. He appeared in 68 games, maintaining his role as a reliable defensive forward, contributing 20 points, and frequently being tasked with penalty killing and neutralizing key opponents. He returned to the Barons for the 2012-13 season but played in only 55 of the team's 76 games. Following that season, the Oilers chose not to renew his contract, marking the end of his professional hockey career.

== Career statistics ==
			Regular season					Playoffs
Season	Team	League	GP	G	A	Pts	PIM	GP	G	A	Pts	PIM
2002–03	Canmore Eagles	AJHL	2	0	0	0	0	—	—	—	—	—
2003–04	Canmore Eagles	AJHL	58	13	19	32	48	—	—	—	—	—
2004-05	Canmore Eagles	AJHL	58	11	18	29	119	—	—	—	—	—
2005–06	Penticton Vees	BCHL	52	14	17	31	36	15	5	4	9	11
2006–07	Penticton Vees	BCHL	58	14	55	69	69	13	4	6	10	12
2007–08	Maine Black Bears	HE	29	1	10	11	12	—	—	—	—	—
2008–09	Maine Black Bears	HE	39	10	14	24	24	—	—	—	—	—
2009–10	Maine Black Bears	HE	35	18	21	39	29	—	—	—	—	—
2010–11	Maine Black Bears	HE	35	10	25	35	56	—	—	—	—	—
2010–11	Oklahoma City Barons	AHL	6	1	4	5	0	1	0	0	0	0
2011–12	Oklahoma City Barons	AHL	68	8	12	20	31	14	1	2	3	7
2012–13	Oklahoma City Barons	AHL	55	7	2	9	43	9	0	1	1	4
AHL totals			129	16	18	34	74	24	1	3	4	11

Awards and achievements
Preceded by Ben Holmstrom	Hockey East Best Defensive Forward; 2010–11	Succeeded by Chris Connolly
