= Kieran Millan =

Canadian ice hockey player (born 1989)

- Born: August 31, 1989 (age 37) Edmonton, Alberta, Canada
- Height: 6 ft 0 in (183 cm)
- Weight: 190 lb (86 kg; 13 st 8 lb)
- Position: Goaltender
- Caught: Left
- Played for: Lake Erie Monsters
- NHL draft: 124th overall, 2009; Colorado Avalanche
- Playing career: 2012–2014

Kieran Millan (born August 31, 1989) is a Canadian former professional ice hockey goaltender. After a successful four-year collegiate career at Boston University, he played two seasons in hockey's minor leagues as a prospect within the Colorado Avalanche organization of the National Hockey League.

== Playing career ==
In 2006, Millan began a 2-year stint with the minor junior hockey Spruce Grove Saints in the Alberta Junior Hockey League. Upon committing to his collegiate freshman year at Boston University, Millan backstopped the Terriers to the 2009 NCAA Championship title and was selected as the Hockey East Rookie of the Year, Hockey East Second All-Star Team, and the Tournament MVP. By the conclusion of his four-year collegiate career, Millan finished as the Boston Terriers' all-time leader in victories, games played, and saves. He was also selected as BU's most valuable player in two consecutive years.

After his 2008–2009 championship season, Millan was selected by the Colorado Avalanche in the fifth round (124th overall) of the 2009 NHL entry draft.

On May 11, 2012, Millan embarked on his professional career by signing to a two-year entry-level contract with the Avalanche. After initially attending training camp with the Avs' AHL affiliate Lake Erie Monsters, Millan was reassigned to make his pro debut with the Denver Cutthroats of the CHL, a secondary affiliate of the Avalanche. On October 20, 2012, Millan made his first start as a professional only to be pulled after yielding 6 goals in a defeat to the Missouri Mavericks. Millan quickly rebounded to settle in net with the Cutthroats and on November 13, 2012, he recorded his first and the Cutthroats first franchise shut-out, in a 6–0 win over the Arizona Sundogs. Millan continued his form to be named as the CHL's First Star of the Month for November. On December 29, 2012, Millan was recalled to the Monsters and made his AHL debut in a 4–0 defeat against the Charlotte Checkers on January 4, 2013. He was then returned to the Cutthroats and was twice awarded CHL goaltender of the week to finish with an even record before an opening round defeat to the Allen Americans in the playoffs.

At the conclusion of his entry-level contract, Millan was not retained by the Avalanche and was released as a free agent. With limited playing opportunities, Millan opted to retire from professional hockey to take up a job in Calgary. His record in 55 professional games was 22–21–6.

== Career statistics ==
| | | | Regular season | | | | | | | | | Playoffs |
| Season | Team | League | GP | W | L | T/OT | MIN | GA | SO | GAA | SV% | GP | W | L | MIN | GA | SO | GAA | SV% |
|---|---|---|---|---|---|---|---|---|---|---|---|---|---|---|---|---|---|---|---|
| 2006–07 | Spruce Grove Saints | AJHL | 32 | 20 | 7 | 4 | 1883 | 82 | 3 | 2.61 | .919 | 4 | 2 | 2 | 200 | 10 | 1 | 3.00 | .906 |
| 2007–08 | Spruce Grove Saints | AJHL | 43 | 21 | 12 | 8 | 2391 | 121 | 1 | 3.04 | .903 | 15 | 8 | 7 | 931 | 34 | 1 | 2.19 | .921 |
| 2008–09 | Boston University | HE | 35 | 29 | 2 | 3 | 2072 | 67 | 3 | 1.94 | .921 | — | — | — | — | — | — | — | — |
| 2009–10 | Boston University | HE | 32 | 16 | 16 | 0 | 1869 | 98 | 1 | 3.15 | .891 | — | — | — | — | — | — | — | — |
| 2010–11 | Boston University | HE | 36 | 16 | 10 | 8 | 2126 | 95 | 1 | 2.68 | .919 | — | — | — | — | — | — | — | — |
| 2011–12 | Boston University | HE | 35 | 20 | 14 | 1 | 2120 | 92 | 3 | 2.60 | .923 | — | — | — | — | — | — | — | — |
| 2012–13 | Denver Cutthroats | CHL | 38 | 15 | 15 | 4 | 2083 | 101 | 2 | 2.91 | .913 | 4 | 1 | 3 | 201 | 10 | 0 | 2.99 | .899 |
| 2012–13 | Lake Erie Monsters | AHL | 1 | 0 | 1 | 0 | 60 | 4 | 0 | 4.00 | .846 | — | — | — | — | — | — | — | — |
| 2013–14 | Denver Cutthroats | CHL | 11 | 5 | 3 | 2 | 626 | 28 | 1 | 2.68 | .921 | — | — | — | — | — | — | — | — |
| 2013–14 | Wheeling Nailers | ECHL | 5 | 2 | 2 | 0 | 241 | 7 | 1 | 1.75 | .929 | — | — | — | — | — | — | — | — |
| AHL totals | | | 1 | 0 | 1 | 0 | 60 | 4 | 0 | 4.00 | .846 | — | — | — | — | — | — | — | — |

== Awards and honours ==
| Award | Year |
|---|---|
College
| All-Hockey East Rookie Team | 2008–09 |
| NCAA Rookie of the Year | 2008–09 |
| All-Hockey East Second Team | 2008–09, 2010–11 |
| Hockey East All-Tournament Team | 2009 |
| Hockey East Tournament MVP | 2009 |
| NCAA All-Tournament Team | 2009 |
| Hockey East Three Stars Award | 2012 |

Awards and achievements
| Preceded by Colin Wilson | Hockey East Rookie of the Year; 2008–09 | Succeeded by Stéphane Da Costa |
| Preceded by Richard Bachman | NCAA Ice Hockey National Rookie of the Year; 2008–09 | Succeeded by Stéphane Da Costa |
| Preceded by Nathan Gerbe | William Flynn Tournament Most Valuable Player; 2009 | Succeeded by Matt Lombardi |
| Preceded by Paul Thompson | Hockey East Three-Stars Award; 2011–12 | Succeeded by John Henrion / Martin Ouellette |
