= Colin Wilson (ice hockey) =

American ice hockey player (born 1989)

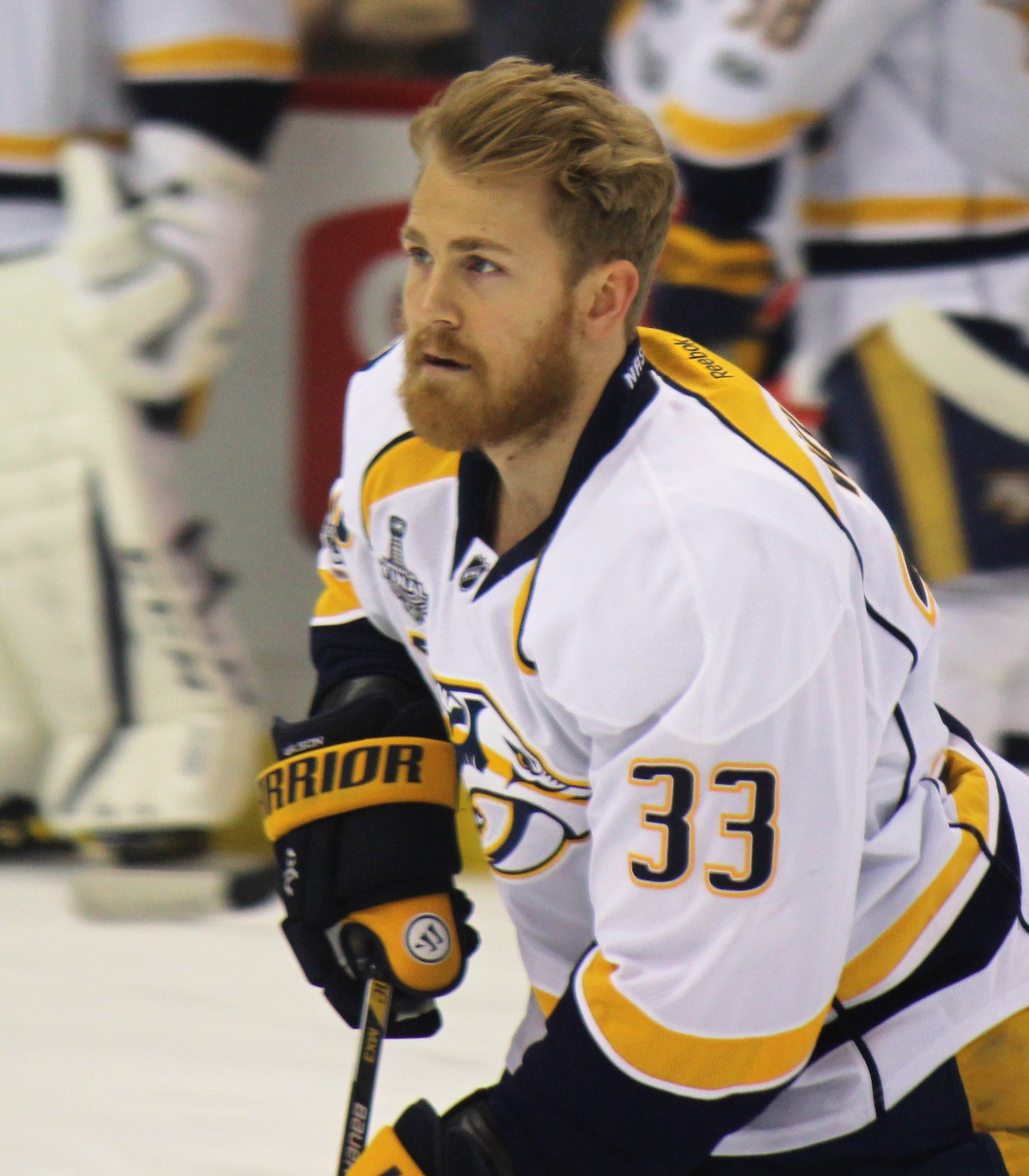
- Wilson with the Nashville Predators during the 2017 Stanley Cup Finals
- Born: October 20, 1989 (age 36) Greenwich, Connecticut, U.S.
- Height: 6 ft 1 in (185 cm)
- Weight: 221 lb (100 kg; 15 st 11 lb)
- Position: Left wing
- Shot: Left
- Played for: Nashville Predators; Colorado Avalanche
- National team: United States
- NHL draft: 7th overall, 2008; Nashville Predators
- Playing career: 2009–2019

Colin Wilson (born October 20, 1989) is an American former professional ice hockey forward. He played eleven seasons in the National Hockey League (NHL) for the Nashville Predators and Colorado Avalanche. He was drafted seventh overall by the Predators in the 2008 NHL entry draft.

Prior to joining the NHL, Wilson played for the Boston University Terriers in the Hockey East conference. During his sophomore year, Wilson was named to the First Team All-American and Hockey East First Team.

== Playing career ==
=== Early career ===
After initially playing with the U.S. National Development Team Program as a junior, Wilson enrolled to play collegiate hockey with the Boston University Terriers of the Hockey East.

After his freshman year with the Terriers in 2007–08, he was awarded New England's college hockey Rookie of the Year, as well as Hockey East Rookie of the Year. He was selected in the first round, 7th overall, by the Nashville Predators of the National Hockey League (NHL) in the 2008 NHL entry draft.

Wilson led the Terriers in points in his sophomore season. He was recognized as one of the best players in NCAA Division I with his election to the Hobey Hat Trick, a group of three players nominated to win the Hobey Baker Memorial Award. His teammate, Matt Gilroy, eventually won the award. Wilson was named a First Team All–American, Hockey East First Team, Hockey East leading goal scorer and was second in the nation in total points. The Terriers were ranked the #1 team in the nation for much of Wilson's sophomore season and went on to win the National Championship.

=== Professional ===
==== Nashville Predators ====
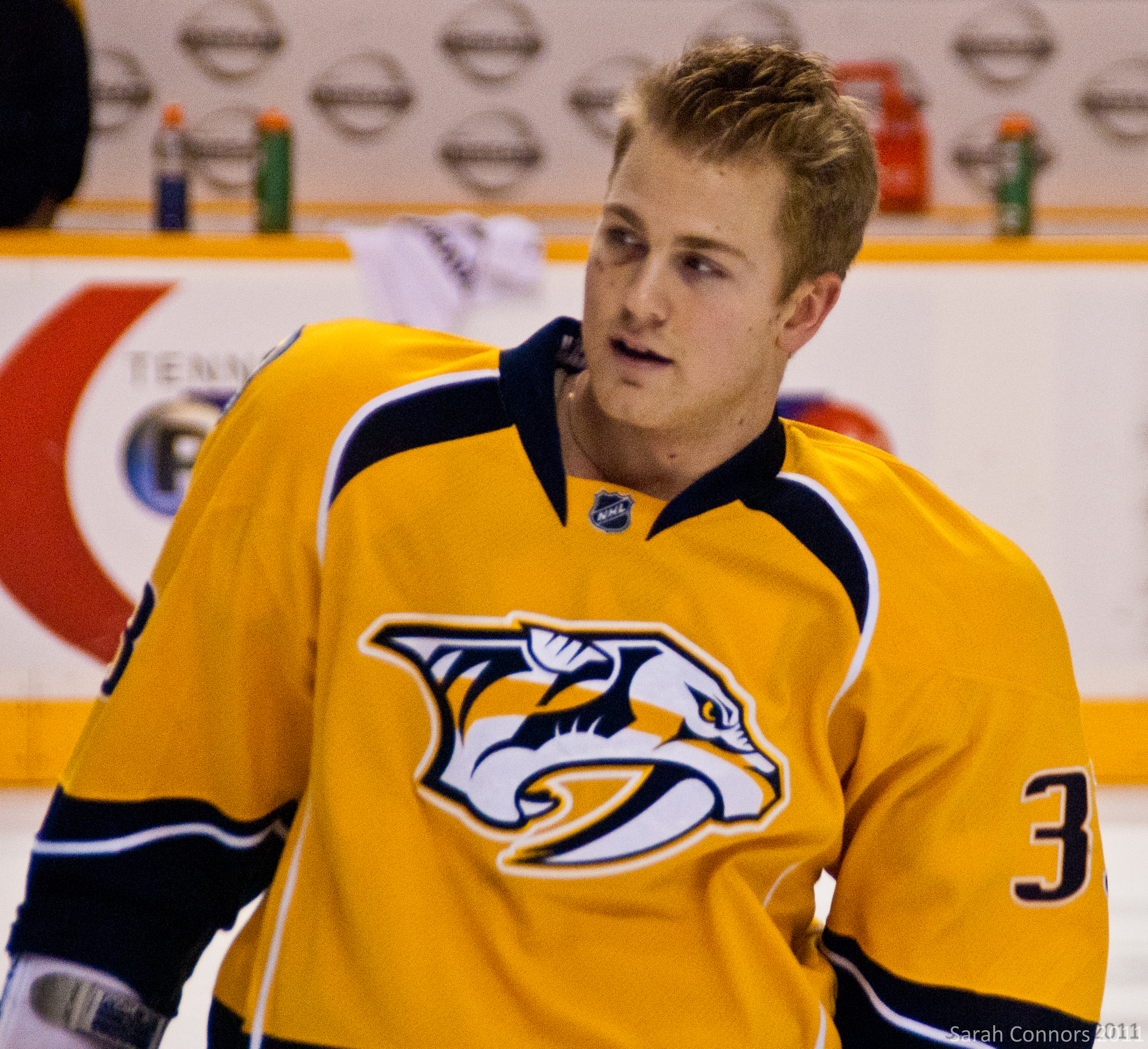
Wilson with the Predators in 2011.

Wilson signed a three-year entry-level contract with Nashville on April 17, 2009, following his sophomore season. Wilson made his NHL debut with the Predators on October 12, 2009. He scored his first NHL goal on October 21 against Tim Thomas of the Boston Bruins.

Following the 2014–15 NHL season Wilson became a restricted free agent under the NHL Collective Bargaining Agreement. The Nashville Predators made him a qualifying offer to retain his NHL rights, and on July 5, 2015, Wilson filed for Salary Arbitration. He signed a four-year, $15.75 million deal with the Predators on July 27, 2015.

==== Colorado Avalanche ====
On July 1, 2017, Wilson was traded by the Predators to the Colorado Avalanche in exchange for a fourth round draft pick in 2019.

Wilson faced his former Nashville teammates in the first round of the 2018 Stanley Cup playoffs. He registered an assist as the Avalanche lost in six games, ending their season.

On July 1, 2019, Wilson agreed to a one-year contract extension with the Avalanche worth $2.6 million.

== International play ==
Medal record

Representing United States

Ice hockey

IIHF U18 Championships
Gold medal – first place	2006 Ängelholm	
Silver medal – second place	2007 Tampere	

Wilson decided to represent Team USA, for whom he had played at the 2008 World Juniors. At the tournament he was tied for the most goals with 6. He was the only roster player never to have played a game in the NHL selected to represent Team USA at the 2009 IIHF World Championships in Bern/Kloten, Switzerland.

== Personal life ==
Wilson is the son of former NHL player Carey Wilson and the grandson of former NHL player Jerry Wilson. He was born in Greenwich, Connecticut while his father played for the New York Rangers, but he was raised in Winnipeg, Manitoba.

Wilson was diagnosed with obsessive–compulsive disorder in 2019.

== Career statistics ==
=== Regular season and playoffs ===
			Regular season					Playoffs
Season	Team	League	GP	G	A	Pts	PIM	GP	G	A	Pts	PIM
2005–06	U.S. NTDP U17	USDP	15	9	7	16	2	—	—	—	—	—
2005–06	U.S. NTDP U18	USDP	16	2	4	6	8	—	—	—	—	—
2005–06	U.S. NTDP U18	NAHL	34	10	11	21	10	7	1	0	1	8
2006–07	U.S. NTDP U18	USDP	41	19	31	50	32	—	—	—	—	—
2006–07	U.S. NTDP U18	NAHL	15	11	13	24	21	—	—	—	—	—
2007–08	Boston University	HE	37	12	23	35	22	—	—	—	—	—
2008–09	Boston University	HE	43	17	38	55	52	—	—	—	—	—
2009–10	Milwaukee Admirals	AHL	40	13	21	34	19	—	—	—	—	—
2009–10	Nashville Predators	NHL	35	8	7	15	7	6	0	1	1	0
2010–11	Nashville Predators	NHL	82	16	18	34	17	3	0	0	0	0
2011–12	Nashville Predators	NHL	68	15	20	35	21	4	1	0	1	0
2012–13	Nashville Predators	NHL	25	7	12	19	4	—	—	—	—	—
2013–14	Nashville Predators	NHL	81	11	22	33	21	—	—	—	—	—
2014–15	Nashville Predators	NHL	77	20	22	42	22	6	5	0	5	0
2015–16	Nashville Predators	NHL	64	6	18	24	14	14	5	8	13	0
2016–17	Nashville Predators	NHL	70	12	23	35	18	14	2	2	4	2
2017–18	Colorado Avalanche	NHL	56	6	12	18	6	6	0	1	1	0
2018–19	Colorado Avalanche	NHL	65	12	15	27	8	12	4	4	8	2
2019–20	Colorado Avalanche	NHL	9	0	4	4	0	—	—	—	—	—
NHL totals			632	113	173	286	138	65	17	16	33	4

=== International ===
Year	Team	Event	Result	GP	G	A	Pts	PIM
2006	United States	U17	2nd place, silver medalist(s)	6	6	2	8	2
2006	United States	WJC18	1st place, gold medalist(s)	6	0	1	1	8
2007	United States	WJC18	2nd place, silver medalist(s)	7	5	7	12	4
2008	United States	WJC	4th	6	6	1	7	4
2009	United States	WJC	5th	6	3	6	9	4
2009	United States	WC	4th	9	0	2	2	2
Junior totals				25	14	15	29	20
Senior totals				9	0	2	2	2

== Awards and honors ==
Award	Year
College
All-Hockey East Rookie Team	2007–08
All-Hockey East First Team	2008–09
AHCA East First-Team All-American	2008–09
Hockey East All-Tournament Team	2009
NCAA All-Tournament Team	2009

Awards and achievements
Preceded by Teddy Purcell	Hockey East Rookie of the Year; 2007–08	Succeeded by Kieran Millan
Preceded by Bryan Ewing	Hockey East Scoring Champion (with James Marcou); 2008–09	Succeeded by Bobby Butler; Gustav Nyquist
Sporting positions
Preceded by Jonathon Blum	Nashville Predators first-round draft pick 2008	Succeeded by Chet Pickard
