= Trent Vogelhuber =

American ice hockey player

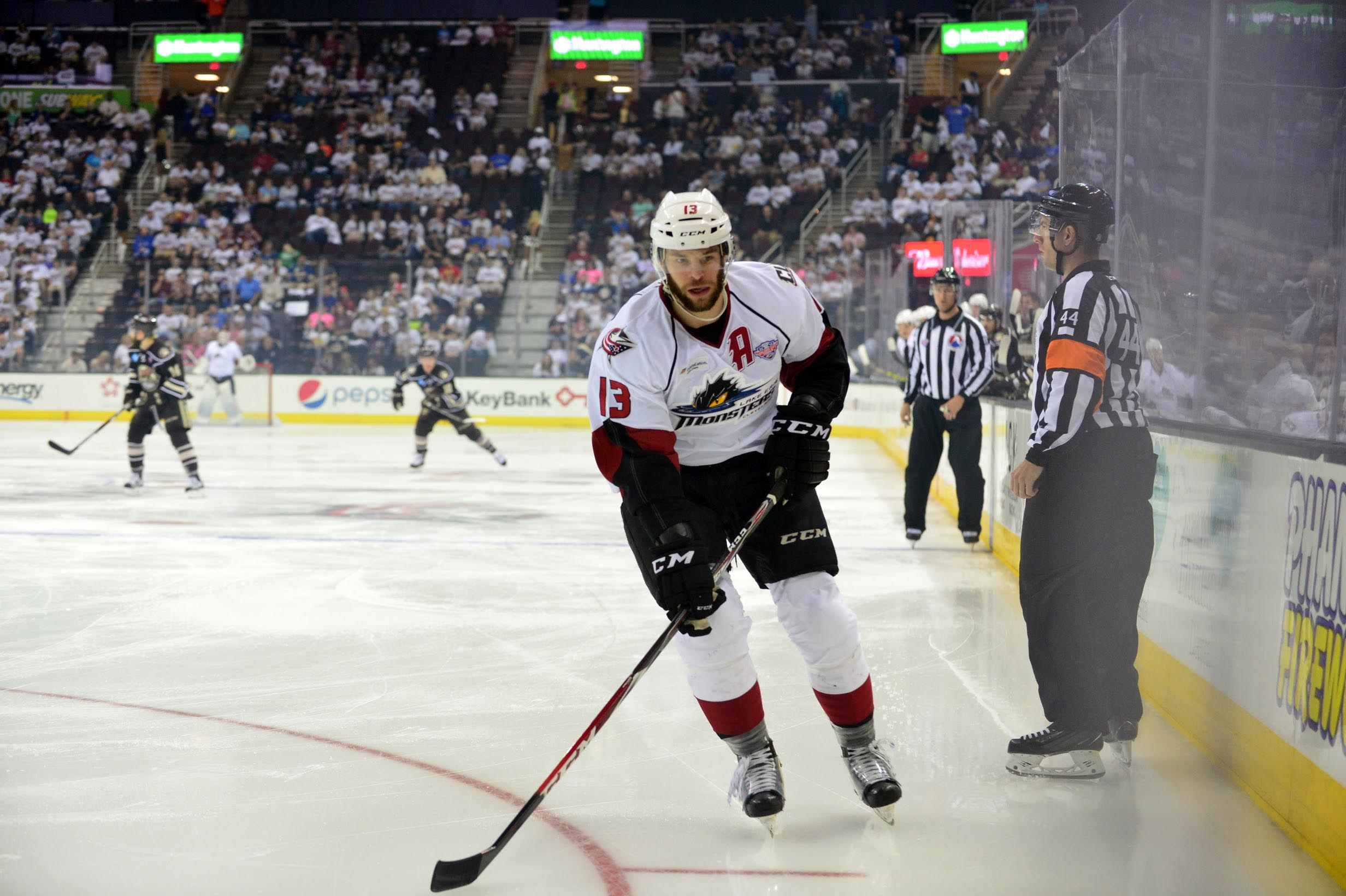
- Vogelhuber with the Lake Erie Monsters in 2016
- Born: 13 July 1988 (age 38) Dublin, Ohio, U.S.
- Height: 6 ft 2 in (188 cm)
- Weight: 185 lb (84 kg; 13 st 3 lb)
- Position: Right wing
- Shot: Right
- Played for: Springfield Falcons; Lake Erie Monsters; San Antonio Rampage
- NHL draft: 211th overall, 2007; Columbus Blue Jackets
- Playing career: 2012–2018
- Coaching career: 2018–present

Trent Vogelhuber (born July 13, 1988) is an American former professional ice hockey forward who most notably played in the American Hockey League (AHL). He was selected in the seventh round, 211th overall, by the Columbus Blue Jackets in the 2007 NHL entry draft. He is currently serving as assistant coach of the Columbus Blue Jackets.

== Playing career ==
=== Amateur ===
Vogelhuber played junior as a product of the Columbus youth hockey system. After appearing with the St. Louis Bandits of the North American Hockey League, Vogelhuber became the first Columbus hockey player to be selected in the NHL draft when he was selected with the last pick in the 2007 NHL entry draft, 211th overall, by the Columbus Blue Jackets. He was limited to just two games due to injury in the 2007–08 season, his last amateur junior year with the Des Moines Buccaneers of the United States Hockey League.

Vogelhuber was the first Columbus-trained player to play at the Division 1 college level with the Miami University RedHawks of the Central Collegiate Hockey Association. In his four-year collegiate career with the RedHawks, Vogelhuber developed his game as a checking-line role player, completing his senior year in the 2011–12 season, and posting career totals of 51 points in 149 games. He immediately embarked on his professional career in playing the final 2 regular season games on an amateur try-out contract with the Blue Jackets AHL affiliate, the Springfield Falcons.

=== Professional ===
Despite being unable to attain an entry-level contract with the Blue Jackets, Vogelhuber remained within the organization by signing an AHL contract to continue with the Springfield Falcons on July 20, 2012. In his rookie season, he began the 2012–13 campaign assigned to ECHL affiliate, the Evansville IceMen. After scoring 16 points in 34 games, Vogelhuber entrenched himself in the AHL with the Falcons. In the following pre-season, having attended the Columbus Blue Jackets training camp on invitation, Vogelhuber became the first Columbus product to feature in an NHL pre-season game, playing the Pittsburgh Penguins on September 16, 2013.

Following his third full season with the Falcons, Vogelhuber continued his progress within the Blue Jackets organization by following their AHL affiliation switch to his home state by signing a one-year deal with the Lake Erie Monsters on June 29, 2015. Entering his fourth full season in AHL, and assuming a veteran role within the Monsters, Vogelhuber was selected as an Alternate captain for the 2015–16 campaign. He responded positively in recording career bests with 11 goals and 27 points in 70 regular season games. In the post-season, he added 2 goals and 7 points as the Monsters dominated the playoffs to collect their first Calder Cup in franchise history.

As a free agent, Vogelhuber secured his first NHL contract in agreeing to a two-year, two-way contract with the Colorado Avalanche on July 1, 2016. Signed through his ties in Columbus with former staffer, Chris MacFarland, Vogelhuber was later joined in Colorado with the hiring of Jared Bednar, his former head coach with the Monsters and Falcons. After suffering an appendectomy, Vogelhuber missed the Avalanche's training camp and was unable to make an impression on his new club. After returning to health and featuring in a single pre-season game, he was among the final cuts to be reassigned to AHL affiliate, the San Antonio Rampage, on October 12, 2016. In the 2016–17 season, Vogelhuber was hit by injury and was limited to just 15 games and 2 assists.

As a free agent from the Avalanche following the conclusion 2017–18 season, Vogelhuber went un-signed over the summer. He accepted an invitation to attend the Columbus Blue Jackets training camp and later returned within the organization by signing a professional try-out contract with the Cleveland Monsters on October 9, 2018.

== Coaching career ==
Vogelhuber did not feature in a game to begin the 2018–19 season, before opting to end his 6-year professional career and immediately assume an assistant coaching role with the Cleveland Monsters on October 23, 2018.

Following the resignation of head coach Mike Eaves at the end of the 2021–22 season, Vogelhuber was named as head coach of the Monsters on June 8, 2022.

== Career statistics ==
			Regular season					Playoffs
Season	Team	League	GP	G	A	Pts	PIM	GP	G	A	Pts	PIM
2006–07	St. Louis Bandits	NAHL	31	10	16	26	24	—	—	—	—	—
2007–08	Des Moines Buccaneers	USHL	2	0	1	1	0	—	—	—	—	—
2008–09	Miami RedHawks	CCHA	29	2	2	4	22	—	—	—	—	—
2009–10	Miami RedHawks	CCHA	42	8	4	12	30	—	—	—	—	—
2010–11	Miami RedHawks	CCHA	39	7	14	21	16	—	—	—	—	—
2011–12	Miami RedHawks	CCHA	39	4	10	14	55	—	—	—	—	—
2011–12	Springfield Falcons	AHL	2	0	0	0	4	—	—	—	—	—
2012–13	Evansville IceMen	ECHL	34	6	10	16	20	—	—	—	—	—
2012–13	Springfield Falcons	AHL	27	4	3	7	14	8	2	0	2	0
2013–14	Springfield Falcons	AHL	30	1	8	9	19	1	0	1	1	0
2014–15	Springfield Falcons	AHL	64	8	8	16	55	—	—	—	—	—
2015–16	Lake Erie Monsters	AHL	70	11	16	27	65	17	2	5	7	8
2016–17	San Antonio Rampage	AHL	15	0	2	2	8	—	—	—	—	—
2017–18	San Antonio Rampage	AHL	59	4	8	12	26	—	—	—	—	—
AHL totals			267	28	45	73	191	26	4	6	10	8

== Awards and honors ==
Awards	Year
AHL
Calder Cup (Lake Erie Monsters)	2016
