= Chris Connolly (ice hockey) =

American ice hockey player

- Born: July 23, 1987 (age 37); Duluth, Minnesota, USA
- Height: 5 ft 9 in (175 cm)
- Weight: 170 lb (77 kg; 12 st 2 lb)
- Position: Forward
- Shot: Left
- Played for: Tappara; Leksands IF; Iserlohn Roosters
- National team: United States
- NHL draft: Undrafted
- Playing career: 2012–2016

Chris Connolly (born July 23, 1987) is a former professional ice hockey forward. He last played for the Iserlohn Roosters of the Deutsche Eishockey Liga (DEL). His younger brother Jack also played professionally.

Undrafted, Connolly played collegiate hockey for Boston University, he was a standout skater with the Terriers and served as a co-captain in 2010–11 and lone Captain in 2011–12 before opting to pursue a professional career abroad in Finland with Liiga club, Tappara.

In his second season with Tappara in the 2013–14 season, Connolly opted for a mid-season transfer to German club, Iserlohn Roosters of the Deutsche Eishockey Liga. After scoring 20 points in 28 games with the Roosters, he left as a free agent and joined his brother Jack in signing with Swedish club Leksands IF of the Swedish Hockey League on April 23, 2014.

For the second consecutive year, Connolly joined the Roosters during the season after appearing in only 5 games with Leksands on October 8, 2014.

Connolly joined the University of Minnesota Duluth women's hockey team as assistant head coach in 2016. However, he resigned in September 2017 to take a sales position in Minneapolis–Saint Paul where his wife and daughter live.

== Awards and honors ==
Award	Year
All-Hockey East Rookie Team	2008–09
All-Hockey East Second Team	2011–12

Awards and achievements
Preceded by Brian Flynn	Len Ceglarski Sportsmanship Award; 2011–12	Succeeded by Chris McCarthy
Preceded by Tanner House	Hockey East Best Defensive Forward; 2011–12	Succeeded by Tim Schaller
