= 2009 ECAC Hockey men's ice hockey tournament =

2009 ECAC Hockey Men's ice hockey tournament
- 2009 ECAC Hockey Men's Ice Hockey Tournament logo
- Dates: March 6–21, 2009
- Teams: 12
- Finals site: Times Union Center; Albany, New York
- Champions: Yale (1st title)
- Winning coach: Keith Allain (1st title)
- MVP: Sean Backman (Yale)
- ECAC Hockey Men's Ice Hockey Tournaments

The 2009 ECAC Hockey Men's Ice Hockey Tournament was the 48th tournament in league history. It was played between March 6 and March 21, 2009. First Round and Quarterfinal games were played at home team campus sites, while the final four games were played at the Times Union Center in Albany, New York. By winning the tournament, Yale received the ECAC Hockey automatic bid to the 2009 NCAA Division I Men's Ice Hockey Tournament.

== Format ==
The tournament features four rounds of play. In the first round, the fifth and twelfth, sixth and eleventh, seventh and tenth, and eighth and ninth seeds as determined by the final regular season standings play a best-of-three series, with the winner advancing to the quarterfinals. There, the first seed and lowest ranked first round winner, the second seed and second lowest ranked first round winner, the third seed and second highest ranked first round winner, and the fourth seed and highest ranked first round winner play a best-of-three series, with the winner advancing to the semifinals. In the semifinals, the highest and lowest seeds and second highest and second lowest seeds play a single-game, with the winner advancing to the championship game and the loser advancing to the third place game. The tournament champion receives an automatic bid to the 2009 NCAA Men's Division I Ice Hockey Tournament.

=== Regular season standings ===
Note: GP = Games played; W = Wins; L = Losses; T = Ties; PTS = Points; GF = Goals For; GA = Goals Against

2008–09 ECAC Hockey standings
	Conference							Overall					
	GP	W	L	T	PTS	GF	GA	GP	W	L	T	GF	GA
#10 Yale†*	22	15	5	2	32	74	48	34	24	8	2	113	76
#12 Cornell	22	13	6	3	29	56	41	36	22	10	4	92	74
#15 Princeton	22	14	8	0	28	53	40	35	22	12	1	99	74
St. Lawrence	22	11	7	4	26	71	48	38	21	12	5	124	92
Harvard	22	9	7	6	24	54	56	31	9	16	6	68	96
Dartmouth	22	11	9	2	24	63	60	31	14	14	3	88	87
Quinnipiac	22	9	10	3	21	62	46	39	18	18	3	124	110
Union	22	9	11	2	20	56	64	39	19	17	3	111	107
Clarkson	22	8	10	4	20	58	68	36	10	19	7	88	115
Colgate	22	6	11	5	17	45	58	37	12	18	7	89	109
Rensselaer	22	6	15	1	13	50	75	39	10	27	2	76	132
Brown	22	3	15	4	10	44	82	33	5	23	5	60	115
Championship: Yale † indicates conference regular season champion (Cleary Cup) * indicates conference tournament champion (Whitelaw Cup); Final rankings: USA Today/USA Hockey Magazine Top 15 Poll

== Bracket ==
Teams are reseeded after the First Round and Quarterfinals

First round March 6–8
5	Harvard	0	0	—
12	Brown	1	2	—
6	Dartmouth	2	1	—
11	Rensselaer	3*	3	—
7	Quinnipiac	3*	4	4*
10	Colgate	2	5*	3
8	Union	5	7	—
9	Clarkson	3	2	—

Quarterfinals; March 13–15
1	Yale	4	2	—
12	Brown	2	0	—
2	Cornell	0	4	4
11	Rensselaer	1	0	3
3	Princeton	3	2	3
8	Union	2	5	1
4	St. Lawrence	5	5	—
7	Quinnipiac	3	3	—

Semifinals; March 20
1	Yale	4
4	St. Lawrence	3
2	Cornell	4**
3	Princeton	3

Championship; March 21
1	Yale	5
2	Cornell	0
Third place
3	Princeton	2
4	St. Lawrence	2

=== First round ===
==== (5) Harvard vs. (12) Brown ====
March 6	Harvard	0 – 1	Brown	Bright Hockey Center	Recap
No Scoring		First period	No scoring
No scoring		Second period	No scoring
No scoring		Third period	03:14 - Harry Zolnierczyk
Ryan Carroll ( 22 saves / 23 shots )		Goalie stats	Mike Clemente ( 39 saves / 39 shots )

March 7	Harvard	0 – 2	Brown	Bright Hockey Center	Recap
No Scoring		First period	02:56 - Eric Slais
No scoring		Second period	No scoring
No scoring		Third period	03:27 - pp - Aaron Volpatti
Ryan Carroll ( 24 saves / 26 shots )		Goalie stats	Mike Clemente ( 47 saves / 47 shots )

Brown won series 2–0

==== (6) Dartmouth vs. (11) Rensselaer ====
March 6	Dartmouth	2 – 3	OT	Rensselaer	Thompson Arena	Recap
Scott Fleming - 03:54		First period		13:33 - Seth Klerer
Scott Fleming - 07:09		Second period		No scoring
No scoring		Third period		02:13 - Jordan Watts
No scoring		First overtime period		13:49 - Christian Morissette
Jody O'Neill ( 33 saves / 36 shots )		Goalie stats		Allen York ( 31 saves / 33 shots )

March 7	Dartmouth	1 – 3	Rensselaer	Thompson Arena	Recap
Joe Gaudet - pp - 14:58		First period	12:23 - Chase Polacek
No scoring		Second period	05:42 - Alex Angers-Goulet; 16:01 - Josh Rabbani
No scoring		Third period	No scoring
Jody O'Neill ( 18 saves / 21 shots )		Goalie stats	Allen York ( 27 saves / 28 shots )

Rensselaer won series 2–0

==== (7) Quinnipiac vs. (10) Colgate ====
March 6	Quinnipiac	3 – 2	OT	Colgate	TD Banknorth Sports Center	Recap
No Scoring		First period		05:09 - Tom Riley; 18:00 - pp - Peter Bogdanich
Jean-Marc Beaudoin - 06:37		Second period		No scoring
David Marshall - pp - 03:54		Third period		No scoring
Brandon Wong - 10:29		First overtime period		No scoring
Bud Fisher ( 31 saves / 33 shots )		Goalie stats		Charles Long ( 27 saves / 30 shots )

March 7	Quinnipiac	4 – 5	OT	Colgate	TD Banknorth Sports Center	Recap
Greg Holt - pp - 17:31		First period		13:22 - Austin Smith
Bryan Leitch - pp - 02:40		Second period		08:28 - David McIntyre
Scott Zurevinski - 12:13; Eric Lampe - sh - 14:28		Third period		17:37 - Nick St. Pierre; 19:41 - pp - Austin Smith
No scoring		First overtime period		00:54 - Austin Smith
Bud Fisher ( 22 saves / 27 shots )		Goalie stats		Charles Long ( 39 saves / 43 shots )

March 8	Quinnipiac	4 – 3	OT	Colgate	TD Banknorth Sports Center	Recap
Greg Holt - 03:34		First period		04:06 - Brian Day; 09:39 - pp - Jason Williams
Mike Atkinson - 03:08; Eric Lampe - pp - 09:58		Second period		No scoring
No scoring		Third period		16:13 - Austin Smith
Brandon Wong - 13:13		First overtime period		No scoring
Bud Fisher ( 39 saves / 42 shots )		Goalie stats		Charles Long ( 31 saves / 35 shots )

Quinnipiac won series 2–1

==== (8) Union vs. (9) Clarkson ====
March 6	Union	5 – 3	Clarkson	Achilles Rink
Mario Valery-Trabucco - 14:14; Adam Presizniuk - 17:27		First period	12:04 - Scott Freeman
Jason Walters - 03:49		Second period	01:13 - Chris D'Alvise; 02:02 - Shea Guthrie
Stephane Boileau - 07:05; Mario Valery-Trabucco - pp - 17:06		Third period	No scoring
Corey Milan ( 18 saves / 21 shots )		Goalie stats	Paul Karpowich ( 30 saves / 35 shots )

March 7	Union	7 – 2	Clarkson	Achilles Rink
Adam Presizniuk - 03:27; Brendan Milnamow - pp - 16:01; Chris Potts - sh - 19:24		First period	No scoring
No scoring		Second period	00:35 - pp - Scott Freeman
Chris Potts - 11:20; Andrew Buote - en sh - 15:11; Andrew Buote - en - 17:42; Matt Cook - pp - 19:18		Third period	14:34 - pp - Tim Marks
Corey Milan ( 32 saves / 34 shots )		Goalie stats	Richie LaVeau ( 11 saves / 14 shots ) Paul Karpowich ( 22 saves / 24 shots )

Union won series 2–0

=== Quarterfinals ===
==== (1) Yale vs. (12) Brown ====
March 13	Yale	4 – 2	Brown	Ingalls Rink	Recap
No Scoring		First period	15:57 - Jordan Pietrus
Patrick Brosnihan - 11:27; Denny Kearney - sh - 19:57		Second period	02:16 - David Brownschidle
Broc Little - pp - 03:06; Kevin Limbert - pp - 09:17		Third period	No scoring
Alec Richards ( 26 saves / 28 shots )		Goalie stats	Mike Clemente ( 31 saves / 35 shots )

March 14	Yale	2 – 0	Brown	Ingalls Rink	Recap
Mark Arcobello - pp - 12:42		First period	No scoring
Sean Backman - pp - 00:37		Second period	No scoring
No scoring		Third period	No scoring
Alec Richards ( 19 saves / 19 shots )		Goalie stats	Mike Clemente ( 34 saves / 36 shots )

Yale won series 2–0

==== (2) Cornell vs. (11) Rensselaer ====
March 13	Cornell	0 – 1	Rensselaer	Lynah Rink
No Scoring		First period	No scoring
No scoring		Second period	No scoring
No scoring		Third period	17:14 - Patrick Cullen
Ben Scrivens ( 13 saves / 14 shots )		Goalie stats	Allen York ( 32 saves / 32 shots )

March 14	Cornell	4 – 0	Rensselaer	Lynah Rink
Evan Barlow - pp - 18:30		First period	No scoring
Riley Nash - 13:14; Evan Barlow - 19:41		Second period	No scoring
Colin Greening - pp - 18:47		Third period	No scoring
Ben Scrivens ( 9 saves / 9 shots )		Goalie stats	Allen York ( 40 saves / 43 shots ) Mathias Lange ( 12 saves / 13 shots )

March 15	Cornell	4 – 3	Rensselaer	Lynah Rink
Evan Barlow - 17:05		First period	No scoring
Evan Barlow - pp - 12:13; Keir Ross - 14:25; Michael Kennedy - 15:49		Second period	11:32 - sh - Matt Angers-Goulet
No scoring		Third period	05:16 - Scott Halpern; 19:04 - Jeff Foss
Ben Scrivens ( 31 saves / 34 shots )		Goalie stats	Allen York ( 22 saves / 26 shots )

Cornell won series 2–1

==== (3) Princeton vs. (8) Union ====
March 13	Princeton	3 – 2	Union	Hobey Baker Memorial Rink
No Scoring		First period	19:40 - pp - Adam Presizniuk
Dan Bartlett - 03:16		Second period	No scoring
Mark Magnowski - 04:21; Lee Jubinville - 09:55		Third period	13:50 - pp - Stephane Boileau
Zane Kalemba ( 25 shots / 27 saves )		Goalie stats	Corey Milan ( 35 shots / 38 saves )

March 14	Princeton	2 – 5	Union	Hobey Baker Memorial Rink
No Scoring		First period	06:41 - Mario Valery-Trabucco; 09:01 - Brendan Milnamow
Dan Bartlett - 14:53		Second period	03:05 - Jason Shaffer; 12:49 - pp - Mario Valery-Trabucco
Dan Bartlett - 14:07		Third period	17:46 - en - Matt Cook
Zane Kalemba ( 17 shots / 21 saves )		Goalie stats	Corey Milan ( 44 shots / 46 saves )

March 15	Princeton	3 – 1	Union	Hobey Baker Memorial Rink
Brett Wilson - 00:56; Dan Bartlett - 02:08; Lee Jubinville - sh - 06:34		First period	No scoring
No scoring		Second period	15:41 - Andrew Buote
No scoring		Third period	No scoring
Zane Kalemba ( 38 shots / 39 saves )		Goalie stats	Corey Milan ( 30 shots / 33 saves )

Princeton won series 2–1

==== (4) St. Lawrence vs. (7) Quinnipiac ====
March 13	St. Lawrence	5 – 3	Quinnipiac	Appleton Arena	Recap
Brock McBride - 10:17; Mike McKenzie - 15:28		First period	No scoring
No scoring		Second period	01:02 - Dan Henningson; 17:49 - Mike Atkinson
Kevin DeVergilio - 01:30; Mark Armstrong - pp - 12:47; Zach Miskovic - 16:01		Third period	11:18 - sh - Mark Nelson
Alex Petizian ( 20 saves / 23 shots )		Goalie stats	Bud Fisher ( 33 saves / 38 shots )

March 14	St. Lawrence	5 – 3	Quinnipiac	Appleton Arena
Travis Vermeulen - 01:06		First period	10:44 - Scott Zurevinski; 15:13 - pp - David Marshall; 16:10 - Eric Lampe
Travis Vermeulen - 01:33; Jared Ross - pp - 03:44; Zach Miskovic - pp - 08:59		Second period	No scoring
Zach Miskovic - 11:27		Third period	No scoring
Alex Petizian ( 33 saves / 36 shots )		Goalie stats	Bud Fisher ( 34 saves / 39 shots )

St. Lawrence won series 2–0

=== Semifinals ===
==== (1) Yale vs. (4) St. Lawrence ====
March 20	Yale	4 – 3	St. Lawrence	Times Union Center	Recap
No Scoring		First period	12:11 - Jared Keller
Broc Little - 04:12; Ken Trentowski - pp - 06:26		Second period	09:39 - Zach Miskovic; 16:54 - Kevin DeVergilio
Mark Arcobello - 18:32; Matt Nelson - 18:54		Third period	No scoring
Alec Richards ( 35 saves / 38 shots )		Goalie stats	Alex Petizian ( 27 saves / 31 shots )

==== (2) Cornell vs. (3) Princeton ====
March 20	Cornell	4 – 3	2OT	Princeton	Times Union Center	Recap
No Scoring		First period		No scoring
Tyler Mugford - 07:15		Second period		01:40 - Sam Sabky; 14:03 - Dan Bartlett
Evan Barlow - 17:08; Riley Nash - 19:35		Third period		11:09 - Cam MacIntyre
Colin Greening - 09:54		Second overtime period		No scoring
Ben Scrivens ( 37 shots / 40 saves )		Goalie stats		Zane Kalemba ( 39 shots / 43 saves )

=== Third place ===
==== (3) Princeton vs. (4) St. Lawrence ====
March 21	Princeton	2 – 2	St. Lawrence	Times Union Center	Recap
Dan Bartlett - 04:59		First period	09:58 - Matt Generous
Dan Bartlett - pp - 01:16		Second period	No scoring
No scoring		Third period	05:48 - Derek Keller
Zane Kalemba ( 34 shots / 36 saves )		Goalie stats	Alex Petizian ( 31 saves / 33 shots )

=== Championship ===
==== (1) Yale vs. (2) Cornell ====
March 21	Yale	5 – 0	Cornell	Times Union Center	Recap
Sean Backman - 14:12		First period	No scoring
Denny Kearney - 13:44; Brian O'Neill - 18:13		Second period	No scoring
Sean Backman - pp - 06:24; Sean Backman - en - 13:50		Third period	No scoring
Alec Richards ( 27 saves / 27 shots )		Goalie stats	Ben Scrivens ( 19 shots / 24 saves )

== Tournament awards ==
=== All-Tournament Team ===
- F Sean Backman* (Yale)
- F Dan Bartlett (Princeton)
- F Broc Little (Yale)
- D Ryan Donald (Yale)
- D Jared Seminoff (Cornell)
- G Alec Richards (Yale)

* Most Outstanding Player(s)
