= Lee Jubinville =

Canadian ice hockey player

- Born: April 30, 1985 (age 41) Edmonton, Alberta, Canada
- Height: 5 ft 10 in (178 cm)
- Weight: 168 lb (76 kg; 12 st 0 lb)
- Position: Forward
- Shot: Left
- Played for: Texas Brahmas
- Playing career: 2005–2010

Lee Edward Jubinville (born April 30, 1985) is a Canadian former ice hockey forward who was an All-American for Princeton.

== Career ==
When Jubinville joined the ice hockey team at Princeton, the program hadn't seen a winning season in seven years and hadn't produced an All-American in almost 20. Nothing changed in his freshman season but the years did allow Jubinville to become acclimated to the college game. His production exploded in his sophomore season, nearly tripling and leading the team. The Tigers fell 1 win shy of .500 but they wouldn't stop there. Jubinville's offence increased again as a junior and he led the team to a program-record 21 wins. He was named an All-American, the ECAC Hockey Player of the Year and became the first Tiger to be nominated for the Hobey Baker Award. That season, the Tigers won just their second ECAC Championship and earned the second NCAA Tournament appearance in program history.

Jubinville's offensive output declined in his final collegiate season, but he still managed to help the team beat the win's record by recording their 22nd win in the conference quarterfinals. Unfortunately, that was their last win. Princeton made the NCAA Tournament for a second consecutive season and built a 4–2 lead that stood until the final minute of regulation. Minnesota–Duluth scored twice in the final 40 seconds, including one with a second to play, and then netted the game-winner in overtime. The miraculous swing denied the Tigers their first postseason victory and ended Jubinville's college career.

After graduating, Jubinville attended the Rochester Americans training camp but ended up signing with the Florida Everblades. Despite high hopes, he ended up playing the entire season at the lowest lever of the minors. Even then his production suffered for the majority of the year, though it did improve during postseason play. Jubinville retired as a player after the season.

== Career statistics ==
=== Regular season and playoffs ===
| | | | Regular season | | | | | Playoffs |
| Season | Team | League | GP | G | A | Pts | PIM | GP | G | A | Pts | PIM |
|---|---|---|---|---|---|---|---|---|---|---|---|---|
| 2000–01 | SSAC Lions U15 AAA | AMBHL | 40 | 22 | 21 | 43 | 22 | — | — | — | — | — |
| 2001–02 | SAC Athletics U18 AAA | AMHL | 36 | 16 | 13 | 29 | 26 | — | — | — | — | — |
| 2002–03 | SAC Athletics U18 AAA | AMHL | 36 | 33 | 28 | 61 | 60 | — | — | — | — | — |
| 2003–04 | Camrose Kodiaks | AJHL | 60 | 26 | 28 | 54 | 18 | — | — | — | — | — |
| 2004–05 | Camrose Kodiaks | AJHL | 64 | 21 | 20 | 41 | 38 | — | — | — | — | — |
| 2005–06 | Princeton | ECAC Hockey | 30 | 3 | 7 | 10 | 30 | — | — | — | — | — |
| 2006–07 | Princeton | ECAC Hockey | 32 | 11 | 18 | 29 | 10 | — | — | — | — | — |
| 2007–08 | Princeton | ECAC Hockey | 34 | 12 | 27 | 39 | 16 | — | — | — | — | — |
| 2008–09 | Princeton | ECAC Hockey | 35 | 10 | 11 | 21 | 16 | — | — | — | — | — |
| 2009–10 | Texas Brahmas | CHL | 41 | 6 | 8 | 14 | 20 | 8 | 3 | 3 | 6 | 10 |
| AMHL totals | | | 72 | 49 | 41 | 90 | 86 | — | — | — | — | — |
| AJHL totals | | | 124 | 47 | 48 | 95 | 56 | — | — | — | — | — |
| NCAA totals | | | 131 | 36 | 63 | 99 | 72 | — | — | — | — | — |

== Awards and honors ==
| Award | Year |
|---|---|
| All-ECAC Hockey First Team | 2007–08 |
| AHCA East First-Team All-American | 2007–08 |

Awards and achievements
| Preceded by Drew Bagnall | ECAC Hockey Player of the Year; 2007–08 | Succeeded by Zane Kalemba |
