= Sean Backman =

American professional ice hockey player

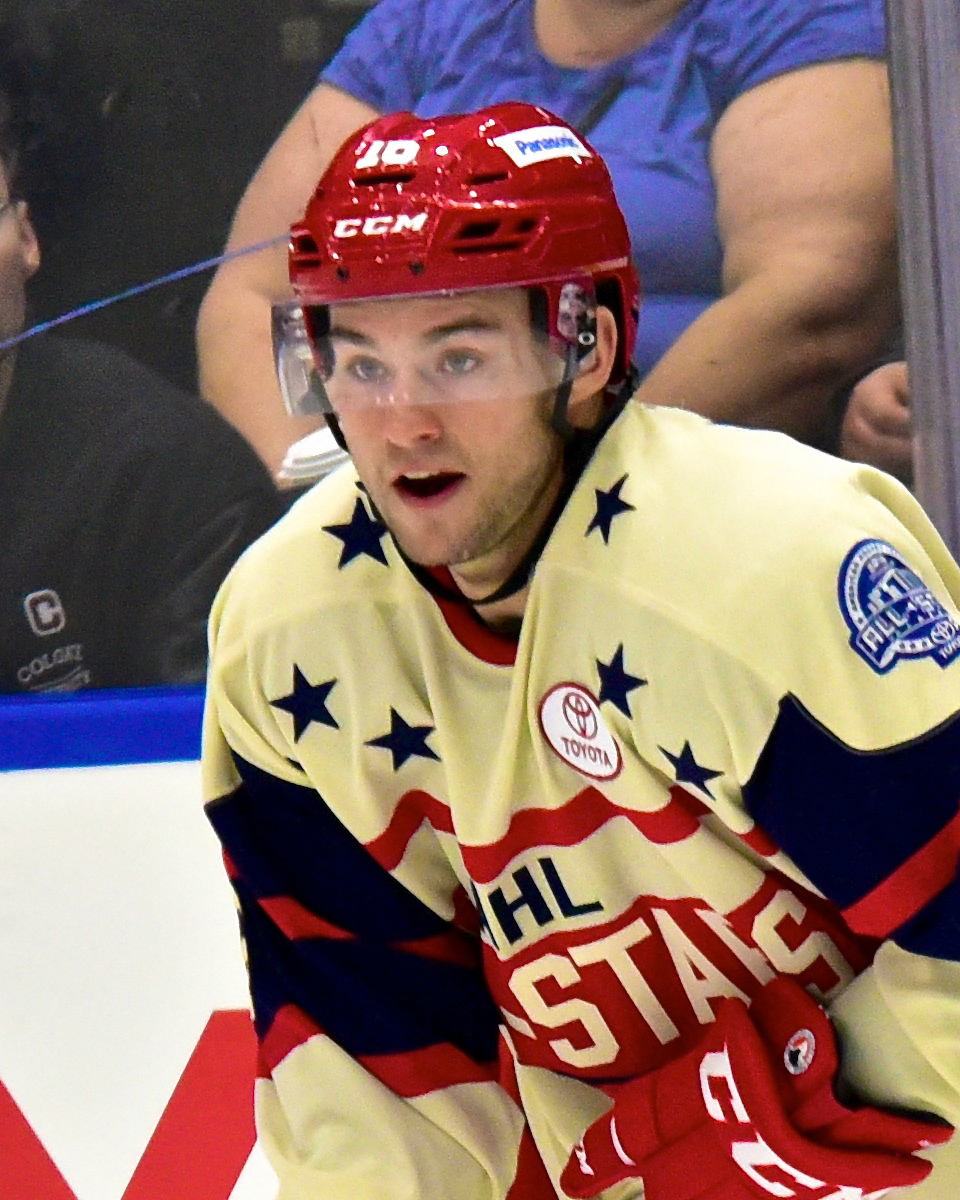
- Backman in 2016
- Born: April 29, 1986 (age 40) Cos Cob, Connecticut, U.S.
- Height: 5 ft 8 in (173 cm)
- Weight: 165 lb (75 kg; 11 st 11 lb)
- Position: Forward
- Shot: Right
- Played for: Texas Stars; Bridgeport Sound Tigers; Manchester Monarchs; Ontario Reign; Eisbären Berlin
- NHL draft: Undrafted
- Playing career: 2010–2020

Sean Backman (born April 29, 1986) is an American former professional ice hockey player. He most notably played in the American Hockey League (AHL) and with Eisbären Berlin of the Deutsche Eishockey Liga (DEL).

== Playing career ==
Sean Backman played high school hockey at Avon Old Farms in Connecticut. Backman began his junior career playing for the Green Bay Gamblers in the USHL. He went on to play ECAC Hockey for Yale University, where he scored 126 points in 122 games during his four-year Yale career. He was selected to the ECAC Second All-Star Team in 2009 and the ECAC First All-Star Team in 2010. He was also selected to the NCAA East Second All-Star Team in 2010. He scored 126 points in 122 games during his four-year Yale career.

Following his successful term playing ECAC Hockey, the undrafted Backman was a free agent for the 2010–11 season. On March 30, 2010, the Dallas Stars organization signed him to a professional contract. He began the 2010–11 AHL season playing for their top farm team - the Texas Stars. On August 8, 2011, Backman signed a one-year two-way deal with the New York Islanders. He is expected to play for the Islanders top farm team, the Bridgeport Sound Tigers of the American Hockey League.

On August 21, 2013, Backman signed a one-year contract to continue in the AHL with the Manchester Monarchs, an affiliate of the Los Angeles Kings. He nearly made his NHL Debut at the Penguins on December 11, 2015, but was not listed on the roster and sent down to the AHL after the game Backman played four seasons within the Kings' AHL affiliates before signing his first contract abroad on a one-year deal with German club Eisbären Berlin, which the Los Angeles Kings also operate.

== Career statistics ==
			Regular season					Playoffs
Season	Team	League	GP	G	A	Pts	PIM	GP	G	A	Pts	PIM
2005–06	Green Bay Gamblers	USHL	57	29	27	56	30	3	0	0	0	6
2006–07	Yale University	ECAC	29	18	13	31	38	—	—	—	—	—
2007–08	Yale University	ECAC	32	18	9	27	16	—	—	—	—	—
2008–09	Yale University	ECAC	32	20	13	33	44	—	—	—	—	—
2009–10	Yale University	ECAC	29	21	14	35	12	—	—	—	—	—
2010–11	Texas Stars	AHL	67	7	16	23	20	6	0	0	0	0
2010–11	Idaho Steelheads	ECHL	5	2	2	4	4	—	—	—	—	—
2011–12	Bridgeport Sound Tigers	AHL	66	7	11	18	20	3	0	0	0	0
2012–13	Bridgeport Sound Tigers	AHL	67	11	10	21	40	—	—	—	—	—
2013–14	Manchester Monarchs	AHL	71	10	16	26	24	4	1	0	1	0
2014–15	Manchester Monarchs	AHL	76	19	25	44	34	19	5	12	17	8
2015–16	Ontario Reign	AHL	68	21	34	55	36	13	1	3	4	8
2016–17	Ontario Reign	AHL	67	12	22	34	24	5	0	1	1	0
2017–18	Eisbären Berlin	DEL	52	24	21	45	51	18	5	6	11	27
2018–19	Eisbären Berlin	DEL	49	13	11	24	34	8	4	3	7	6
2019–20	Eisbären Berlin	DEL	13	1	4	5	16	—	—	—	—	—
AHL totals			482	87	134	221	198	50	7	16	23	16

== Awards and honors ==
Awards	Year
College
All-ECAC Hockey Rookie Team	2006–07
All-ECAC Hockey Third Team	2006–07, 2007–08
All-ECAC Hockey Second Team	2008–09
ECAC Hockey All-Tournament Team	2009
All-ECAC Hockey First Team	2009–10
AHCA East Second-Team All-American	2009–10
AHL
Calder Cup (Manchester Monarchs)	2015

Awards and achievements
Preceded by Bryan Leitch	ECAC Hockey Rookie of the Year; 2006–07; With: Brandon Wong	Succeeded by Riley Nash
Preceded by Zane Kalemba	ECAC Hockey Most Outstanding Player in Tournament; 2009	Succeeded by Ben Scrivens
