= Chase Polacek =

American ice hockey player

- Born: June 19, 1989 (age 36) Edina, Minnesota, U.S.
- Height: 5 ft 8 in (173 cm)
- Weight: 165 lb (75 kg; 11 st 11 lb)
- Position: Forward
- Shot: Right
- AHL team: Peoria Rivermen
- NHL draft: Undrafted
- Playing career: 2007–2012

Chase Polacek (born June 19, 1989) is an American professional ice hockey player who played for the Peoria Rivermen in the American Hockey League.

Prior to turning professional, Polacek attended the Rensselaer Polytechnic Institute where he played four seasons with the RPI Engineers men's ice hockey team, which competes in the ECAC conference, playing NCAA Division I ice hockey.

== Awards and honors ==
Award	Year
All-ECAC Hockey Rookie Team	2007–08
All-ECAC Hockey First Team	2009–10
AHCA East First-Team All-American	2009–10
All-ECAC Hockey First Team	2010–11
AHCA East First-Team All-American	2010–11

== Career statistics ==
			Regular season					Playoffs
Season	Team	League	GP	G	A	Pts	PIM	GP	G	A	Pts	PIM
2006–07	Academy of Holy Angels	HSMN	28	26	38	64		—	—	—	—	—
2007–08	RPI Engineers	ECAC	38	7	21	28	24	—	—	—	—	—
2008–09	RPI Engineers	ECAC	39	11	21	32	59	—	—	—	—	—
2009–10	RPI Engineers	ECAC	39	26	26	52	40	—	—	—	—	—
2010–11	RPI Engineers	ECAC	38	21	27	48	36	—	—	—	—	—
2010–11	Peoria Rivermen	AHL	2	0	0	0	0	2	0	0	0	0
2011–12	Peoria Rivermen	AHL	16	1	1	2	2	—	—	—	—	—
2011–12	Alaska Aces	ECHL	2	2	0	2	0	—	—	—	—	—
AHL totals			18	1	1	2	2	2	0	0	0	0

Awards and achievements
Preceded by Zane Kalemba	ECAC Hockey Player of the Year; 2009–10 / 2010–11	Succeeded by Austin Smith
