= ECAC Hockey Player of the Year =

Annual ice hockey award

- Sport: Ice hockey
- Awarded for: The Player of the Year in ECAC Hockey

History
- First award: 1962
- Most recent: Hayden Stavroff

The ECAC Hockey Player of the Year is an annual award given out at the conclusion of the ECAC Hockey regular season to the best player in the conference as voted by the coaches of each ECAC team.

The Player of the Year was first awarded in 1962 and every year thereafter.

Four players (Bob Brinkworth, Scott Fusco, Chase Polacek and Jimmy Vesey) have received the award two separate times, each doing so in consecutive years. The award has been split twice in its history, 2002–03 and 2013–14.

== Award winners ==
Year	Winner	Position	School
1961–62	Ron Ryan	Right wing	Colby
1962–63	Bob Brinkworth	Center	Rensselaer
1963–64	Bob Brinkworth	Center	Rensselaer
1964–65	John Cunniff	Left wing	Boston College
1965–66	Terry Yurkiewicz	Goaltender	Clarkson
1966–67	Doug Ferguson	Center	Cornell
1967–68	Wayne Small	Forward	Brown
1968–69	Ken Dryden	Goaltender	Cornell
1969–70	Tim Sheehy	Center	Boston College
1970–71	Bruce Bullock	Goaltender	Clarkson
1971–72	Bob Brown	Defenceman	Boston University
1972–73	Tom Mellor	Defenceman	Boston College
1973–74	Randy Roth	Forward	Harvard
1974–75	Ron Wilson	Defenceman	Providence
1975–76	Peter Brown	Defenceman	Boston University
1976–77	Dave Taylor	Right wing	Clarkson
1977–78	Lance Nethery	Center	Cornell
1978–79	Ralph Cox	Center	New Hampshire
1979–80	Craig Homola	Center	Vermont
1980–81	Ed Small	Defenceman	Clarkson
1981–82	Steve Cruickshank	Center	Clarkson
1982–83	Randy Velischek	Defenceman	Providence

Year	Winner	Position	School
1983–84	Cleon Daskalakis	Goaltender	Boston University
1984–85	Scott Fusco	Center	Harvard
1985–86	Scott Fusco	Center	Harvard
1986–87	Joe Nieuwendyk	Center	Cornell
1987–88	Pete Lappin	Right wing	St. Lawrence
1988–89	Lane MacDonald	Left wing	Harvard
1989–90	Dave Gagnon	Goaltender	Colgate
1990–91	Peter Ciavaglia	Center	Harvard
1991–92	Daniel Laperrière	Defenceman	St. Lawrence
1992–93	Ted Drury	Center	Harvard
1993–94	Steve Martins	Center	Harvard
1994–95	Martin St. Louis	Right wing	Vermont
1995–96	Éric Perrin	Center	Vermont
1996–97	Todd White	Center	Clarkson
1997–98	Ray Giroux	Defenceman	Yale
1998–99	Eric Heffler	Goaltender	St. Lawrence
1999–00	Andy McDonald	Center	Colgate
2000–01	Erik Anderson	Center	St. Lawrence
2001–02	Marc Cavosie	Left wing	Rensselaer
2002–03	Chris Higgins	Left wing	Yale
2002–03	David LeNeveu	Goaltender	Cornell
2003–04	Yann Danis	Goaltender	Brown

Year	Winner	Position	School
2004–05	David McKee	Goaltender	Cornell
2005–06	T. J. Trevelyan	Left wing	St. Lawrence
2006–07	Drew Bagnall	Defenceman	St. Lawrence
2007–08	Lee Jubinville	Forward	Princeton
2008–09	Zane Kalemba	Goaltender	Princeton
2009–10	Chase Polacek	Right wing	Rensselaer
2010–11	Chase Polacek	Right wing	Rensselaer
2011–12	Austin Smith	Right wing	Colgate
2012–13	Eric Hartzell	Goaltender	Quinnipiac
2013–14	Greg Carey	Left wing	St. Lawrence
2013–14	Shayne Gostisbehere	Defenceman	Union
2014–15	Jimmy Vesey	Left wing	Harvard
2015–16	Jimmy Vesey	Left wing	Harvard
2016–17	Mike Vecchione	Forward	Union
2017–18	Ryan Donato	Center	Harvard
2018–19	Adam Fox	Defenceman	Harvard
2019–20	Morgan Barron	Forward	Cornell
2020–21	Odeen Tufto	Center	Quinnipiac
2021–22	Yaniv Perets	Goaltender	Quinnipiac
2022–23	Sean Farrell	Left wing	Harvard
2023–24	Collin Graf	Right wing	Quinnipiac
2024–25	Ayrton Martino	Left wing	Clarkson
2025–26	Hayden Stavroff	Forward	Dartmouth

=== Winners by school ===
School	Winners
Harvard	10
Clarkson	7
Cornell	7
St. Lawrence	7
Rensselaer	5
Quinnipiac	4
Boston College	3
Boston University	3
Colgate	3
Vermont	3
Brown	2
Princeton	2
Providence	2
Union	2
Yale	2
Colby	1
Dartmouth	1
New Hampshire	1

=== Winners by position ===
Position	Winners
Center	20
Right wing	7
Left wing	8
Forward	6
Defenceman	11
Goaltender	12

== See also ==
- ECAC Hockey Awards
