= Zach Miskovic =

American ice hockey player (born 1985)

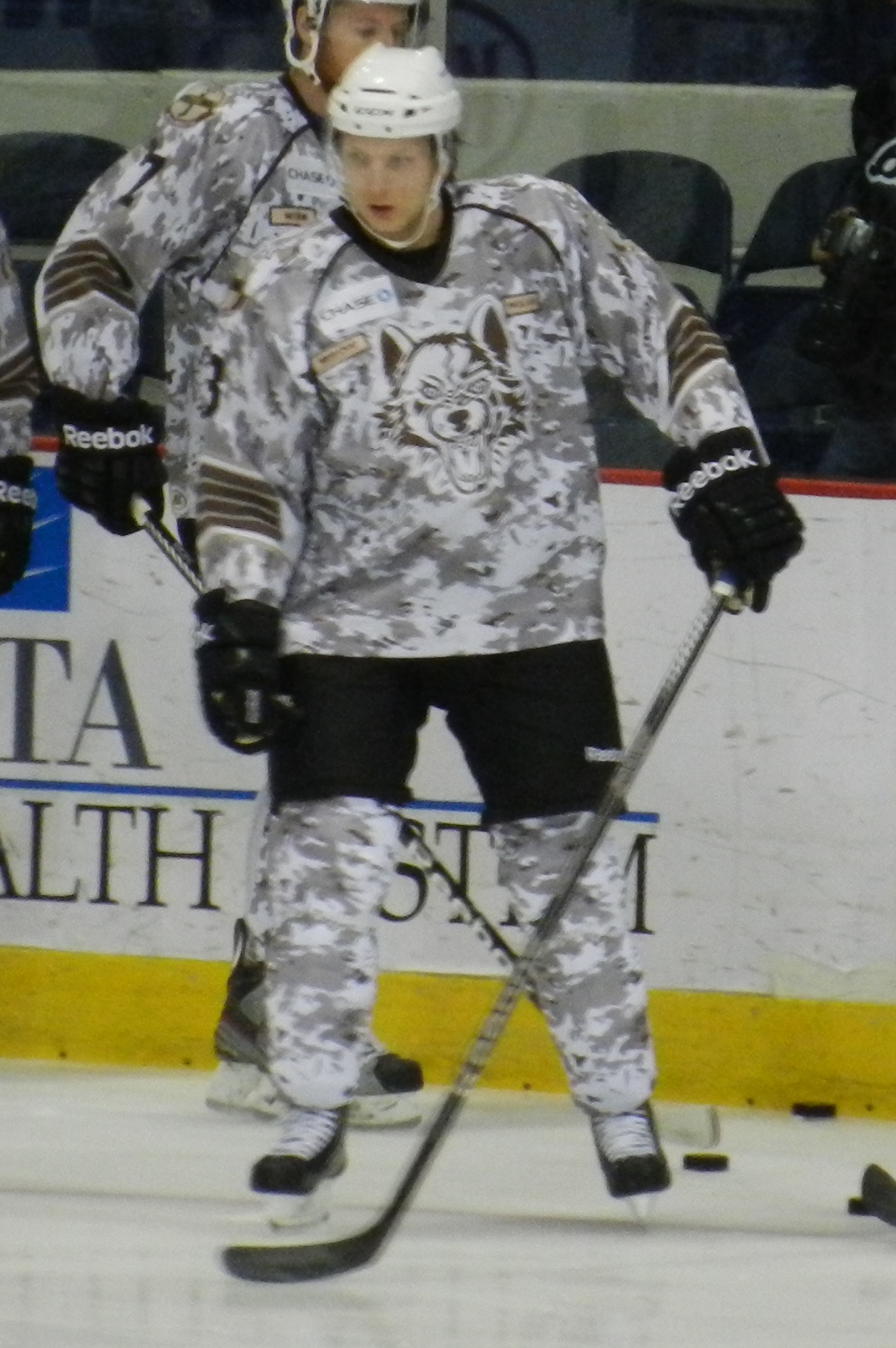
- Miskovic playing for the Chicago Wolves during a military appreciation night in 2013
- Born: May 8, 1985 (age 41) River Forest, Illinois, U.S.
- Height: 6 ft 1 in (185 cm)
- Weight: 185 lb (84 kg; 13 st 3 lb)
- Position: Defense
- Shot: Right
- Played for: Hershey Bears; Chicago Wolves; San Antonio Rampage; Rockford IceHogs; Iowa Wild; Charlotte Checkers
- NHL draft: Undrafted
- Playing career: 2009–2019

Zach Miskovic (born May 8, 1985) is an American professional ice hockey player of Croatian ancestry. He most recently played with the Indy Fuel in the ECHL.

== Professional career ==
On March 25, 2009, he signed with the Washington Capitals as a free agent, marking a significant step in his professional hockey career. After spending time with the organization and demonstrating his abilities, the Capitals decided to extend their commitment to him. On July 15, 2010, they re-signed him to a new one-year contract as a restricted free agent, showing their continued interest in having him contribute to the team’s future success.

Miskovic faced a challenging beginning to the 2010–11 season after suffering a knee injury in July 2010 caused by a hit from the 6-foot-8, 262-pound Joe Finley during the Capitals' development camp. This injury disrupted his off-season training, but he pushed through and managed to play 58 games with the Hershey Bears, achieving a career-best seven goals. In recognition of his efforts, the Washington Capitals signed him to another one-year contract extension on May 18, 2011.

On February 26, 2014, Miskovic was traded from the Rockford IceHogs to the Iowa Wild in exchange for future considerations. After the trade, he joined the Wild's roster and participated in 19 games for the remainder of the season.

On July 2, 2014, Miskovic decided to return to the Rockford IceHogs by agreeing to a one-year contract.

On September 23, 2015, following a period of remaining unsigned throughout the offseason, Miskovic decided to stay within the Rockford IceHogs organization by signing a one-year contract with their ECHL affiliate team, the Indy Fuel.

== Career statistics ==
			Regular season					Playoffs
Season	Team	League	GP	G	A	Pts	PIM	GP	G	A	Pts	PIM
2002–03	Cedar Rapids RoughRiders	USHL	60	2	6	8	91	7	0	0	0	12
2003–04	Cedar Rapids RoughRiders	USHL	60	6	15	21	139	4	1	1	2	2
2004–05	Cedar Rapids RoughRiders	USHL	60	4	16	20	149	8	1	0	1	14
2005–06	St. Lawrence University	ECAC	40	1	15	16	30	—	—	—	—	—
2006–07	St. Lawrence University	ECAC	39	2	10	12	48	—	—	—	—	—
2007–08	St. Lawrence University	ECAC	37	8	12	20	36	—	—	—	—	—
2008–09	St. Lawrence University	ECAC	38	16	9	25	32	—	—	—	—	—
2009–10	Hershey Bears	AHL	59	6	20	26	25	6	1	1	2	0
2010–11	Hershey Bears	AHL	58	7	9	16	58	5	0	0	0	8
2011–12	Hershey Bears	AHL	35	0	3	3	26	—	—	—	—	—
2012–13	Chicago Wolves	AHL	15	2	1	3	9	—	—	—	—	—
2012–13	San Antonio Rampage	AHL	27	4	9	13	22	—	—	—	—	—
2013–14	San Antonio Rampage	AHL	10	0	2	2	2	—	—	—	—	—
2013–14	Cincinnati Cyclones	ECHL	6	2	2	4	2	—	—	—	—	—
2013–14	Rockford IceHogs	AHL	14	0	6	6	10	—	—	—	—	—
2013–14	Iowa Wild	AHL	19	1	0	1	16	—	—	—	—	—
2014–15	Rockford IceHogs	AHL	42	2	6	8	40	2	1	0	1	2
2015–16	Indy Fuel	ECHL	63	9	13	22	53	—	—	—	—	—
2015–16	Charlotte Checkers	AHL	7	0	4	4	2	—	—	—	—	—
2016–17	Indy Fuel	ECHL	51	2	12	14	60	—	—	—	—	—
2017–18	Indy Fuel	ECHL	72	7	12	19	75	4	0	2	2	4
2018–19	Indy Fuel	ECHL	68	3	12	15	56	—	—	—	—	—
AHL totals			286	22	61	83	210	16	2	3	5	10

== Awards and honors ==
Award	Year
College
All-ECAC Hockey First Team	2008–09
AHCA East First-Team All-American	2008–09
