= Lane Caffaro =

Canadian ice hockey player (born 1984)

- Born: March 5, 1984 (age 41) Slave Lake, Alberta, Canada
- Height: 6 ft 1 in (185 cm)
- Weight: 190 lb (86 kg; 13 st 8 lb)
- Position: Defence
- Shot: Left
- Played for: Wilkes-Barre/Scranton Penguins; Hannover Indians
- NHL draft: Undrafted
- Playing career: 2009–2011

Lane Caffaro (born March 5, 1984) is a Canadian former professional ice hockey defenceman who last played for the Hannover Indians in the German 2nd Bundesliga.

Prior to turning professional, Caffaro attended the Union College where he played four seasons with the Union Garnet Chargers men's ice hockey team which competes in NCAA's Division I in the ECAC Hockey conference. In his senior year (2008–09) Caffaro was named to the All-ECAC Hockey First-Team.

== Awards and honours ==
Award	Year
College
All-ECAC Hockey Second Team	2007–08
All-ECAC Hockey First Team	2008–09
