= Matt Generous =

American ice hockey player (born 1985)

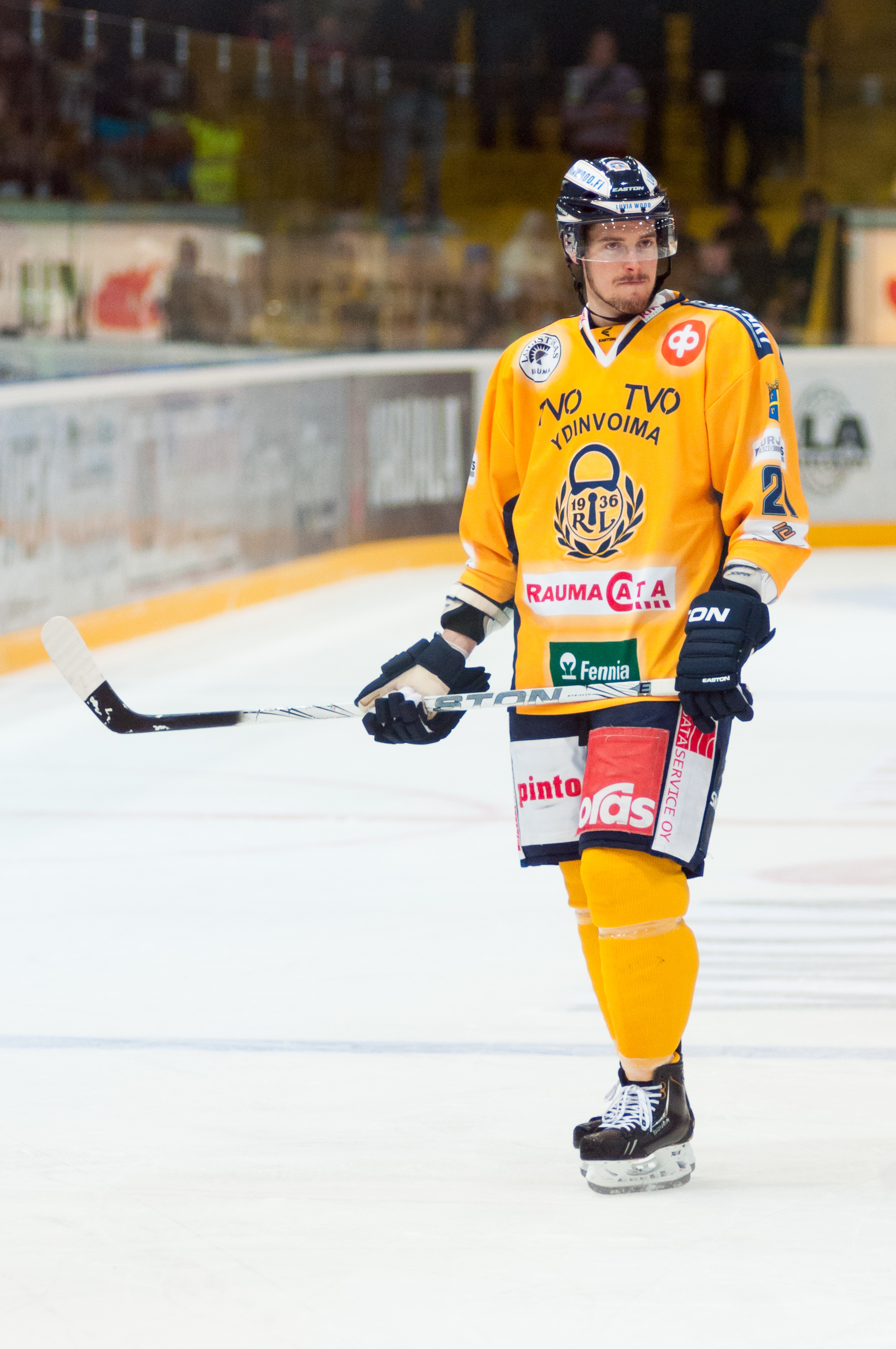
- Born: May 4, 1985 (age 41) Cheshire, Connecticut, U.S.
- Height: 6 ft 3 in (191 cm)
- Weight: 200 lb (91 kg; 14 st 4 lb)
- Position: Defense
- Shot: Right
- Played for: Portland Pirates; Lake Erie Monsters; Lukko; Sport; HIFK; EC Red Bull Salzburg; Ilves
- NHL draft: 208th overall, 2005; Buffalo Sabres
- Playing career: 2009–2019

Matthew James Generous (born May 4, 1985) is an American former professional ice hockey defenseman who last played for Ilves of the Finnish Liiga.

== Playing career ==
Generous first played Junior A hockey in the EJHL with the New England Jr Falcons before he was drafted in the seventh round, 208th overall, in the 2005 NHL entry draft by the Buffalo Sabres. Generous then committed to play collegiate hockey in the ECAC with St. Lawrence University. In his senior year in 2008–09, Generous had 8 goals for 17 points and was +5 in 35 games to be named the ECAC's Outstanding Defensive Defenseman. Generous completed his four-year Saints career with 56 points (18+38) in 139 games, and was a four-time member of the ECAC All-Academic Team.

On April 1, 2009, Generous signed a one-year, entry-level contract with the Buffalo Sabres and was immediately assigned to AHL affiliate, the Portland Pirates, to begin his professional career in the remainder of the 2008–09 campaign.

After attending the Sabres training camp for the 2009–10 season, Generous was then reassigned to the Pirates on September 22, 2009. In his first full professional season, Generous remained with the Pirates for the entirety of the year and in 61 games posted 2 goals and 11 assists.

Without a contract offer from the Sabres at season's end, Generous attended fellow AHL team, the Providence Bruins, training camp on a try-out for the 2010–11 season. On October 1, Generous was released from the Bruins, however, he was then signed a one-year contract with ECHL affiliate, the Reading Royals. After starting the season on the Blueline with Royals Generous was then signed to a professional try-out contract with the Lake Erie Monsters of the AHL on December 14, 2010.

After three seasons with Lukko, Generous opted to join newly promoted Sport on a one-year contract on April 17, 2014. During the season Generous was traded to HIFK on February 3, 2015. He left the team after the conclusion of the 2016–17 season and signed with EC Red Bull Salzburg of the Austrian EBEL on May 23, 2017.

In the 2017–18 season, Generous served as Salzburg's shutdown defenseman with 6 points in 39 games. In the post-season, Generous helped Salzburg reach the final as Austrian Champions, before losing in game 7 to HC Bolzano. In the off-season Generous opted to return to Finland, securing a one-year contract with his fourth Liiga outfit, Ilves Tampere, on May 25, 2018.

== Career statistics ==
			Regular season					Playoffs
Season	Team	League	GP	G	A	Pts	PIM	GP	G	A	Pts	PIM
2002–03	New England Jr. Coyotes	EJHL	49	3	7	10	90	—	—	—	—	—
2003–04	New England Jr. Coyotes	EJHL	34	4	4	8	90	—	—	—	—	—
2004–05	New England Jr. Falcons	EJHL	49	8	16	24	105	—	—	—	—	—
2005–06	St. Lawrence University	ECAC	34	4	11	15	34	—	—	—	—	—
2006–07	St. Lawrence University	ECAC	37	3	6	9	34	—	—	—	—	—
2007–08	St. Lawrence University	ECAC	33	3	12	15	31	—	—	—	—	—
2008–09	St. Lawrence University	ECAC	35	8	9	17	34	—	—	—	—	—
2008–09	Portland Pirates	AHL	4	1	0	1	13	4	0	0	0	0
2009–10	Portland Pirates	AHL	61	2	11	13	74	—	—	—	—	—
2010–11	Reading Royals	ECHL	22	1	4	5	20	—	—	—	—	—
2010–11	Lake Erie Monsters	AHL	40	1	4	5	63	7	0	0	0	2
2011–12	Lukko	SM-l	57	3	10	13	102	—	—	—	—	—
2012–13	Lukko	SM-l	60	1	6	7	38	13	1	1	2	14
2013–14	Lukko	Liiga	52	1	6	7	47	15	1	1	2	10
2014–15	Sport	Liiga	45	1	3	4	81	—	—	—	—	—
2014–15	HIFK	Liiga	11	3	1	4	45	7	0	0	0	28
2015–16	HIFK	Liiga	48	1	6	7	134	16	1	2	3	16
2016–17	HIFK	Liiga	34	1	7	8	67	14	0	1	1	38
2017–18	EC Red Bull Salzburg	AUT	39	2	4	6	44	11	1	2	3	26
2018–19	Ilves	Liiga	40	0	0	0	45	6	0	0	0	4
AHL totals			105	4	15	19	150	11	0	0	0	2
Liiga totals			347	11	39	50	559	71	3	5	8	110

== Awards and honors ==
Award	Year
College
All-ECAC Rookie Team	2005–06

Awards and achievements
Preceded by Mike Moore	ECAC Hockey Best Defensive Defenseman; 2008–09	Succeeded by Justin Krueger
