= Austin Smith (ice hockey) =

American ice hockey player

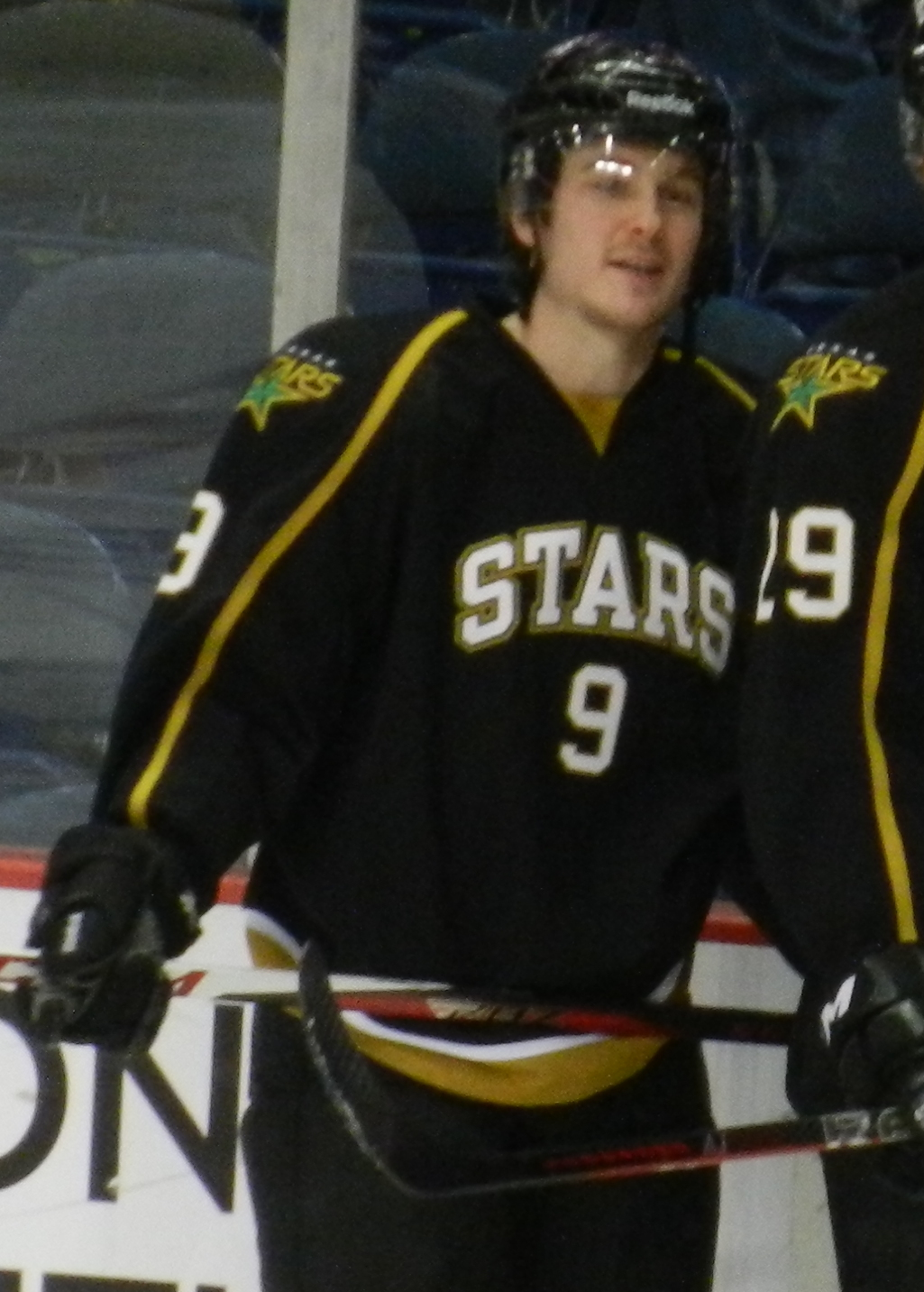
- Born: November 7, 1988 (age 37) Dallas, Texas, U.S.
- Height: 5 ft 11 in (180 cm)
- Weight: 181 lb (82 kg; 12 st 13 lb)
- Position: Forward
- Shot: Right
- Played for: Texas Stars; Ässät; Ravensburg Towerstars; HC TWK Innsbruck; HC Bolzano
- NHL draft: 128th overall, 2007; Dallas Stars
- Playing career: 2012–2018

Austin Smith (born November 7, 1988) is an American former professional ice hockey player. He was selected by the Dallas Stars in the 5th round (128th overall) of the 2007 NHL entry draft.

== Playing career ==
A graduate of Colgate University, Smith played with the Colgate Raiders in the NCAA Men's Division I ECAC Hockey conference. In his senior year, Smith's outstanding play was recognized when he was recognized as ECAC Hockey's most valuable player and was selected to the 2011–12 ECAC Hockey First Team, as well as a Hobey Baker finalist and First Team All-American.

In March 2012 Dallas Stars signed Austin Smith to a two-year entry-level contract.

In these two years, Smith split between AHL and ECHL affiliates Texas Stars and Idaho Steelheads. In AHL games, he scored 2 goals with 4 assists in 38 games. In the ECHL he was the Steelheads leading scorer with 27 goals and 23 assists in 38 games in 2012–13 season.

Austin was loaned to the Liiga (Finland's Top Pro League) by the Dallas Stars in December 2013. After a successful loan period with Ässät during the latter half of the 2013–14 season, as an impending free agent with the Dallas Stars, Smith opted to remain with Pori in signing a one-year contract for the following season on January 22, 2014. After a dispute with one of the coaches which led to no discussion between the two in October 2014, ECHL team Allen Americans signed forward Austin Smith to a contract for the 2014–15 season.

In December 2014, Smith returned to Europe and signed a contract with Ravensburg Towerstars in the German second-level league DEL2. In the 2015–16 season he shared with 37 goals in 40 games the top spot in the DEL2 goal scoring ranks.

== Career statistics ==
			Regular season					Playoffs
Season	Team	League	GP	G	A	Pts	PIM	GP	G	A	Pts	PIM
2003–04	Jesuit High School	HSTX
2004–05	Jesuit High School	HSTX
2005–06	The Gunnery	HS Prep	34	23	19	42		—	—	—	—	—
2006–07	The Gunnery	HS Prep	32	24	39	63		—	—	—	—	—
2007–08	Penticton Vees	BCHL	60	32	35	67	42	15	11	11	22	12
2008–09	Colgate University	ECAC	37	17	14	31	24	—	—	—	—	—
2009–10	Colgate University	ECAC	36	16	25	41	20	—	—	—	—	—
2010–11	Colgate University	ECAC	41	10	21	31	36	—	—	—	—	—
2011–12	Colgate University	ECAC	39	36	21	57	30	—	—	—	—	—
2011–12	Texas Stars	AHL	12	0	3	3	8	—	—	—	—	—
2012–13	Texas Stars	AHL	16	2	1	3	6	—	—	—	—	—
2012–13	Idaho Steelheads	ECHL	38	27	23	50	15	17	7	5	12	12
2013–14	Texas Stars	AHL	10	0	0	0	4	—	—	—	—	—
2013–14	Idaho Steelheads	ECHL	4	1	0	1	18	—	—	—	—	—
2013–14	Ässät	Liiga	28	6	7	13	20	—	—	—	—	—
2014–15	Ässät	Liiga	10	2	1	3	8	—	—	—	—	—
2014–15	Allen Americans	ECHL	7	3	6	9	6	—	—	—	—	—
2014–15	Ravensburg Towerstars	DEL2	29	22	19	41	26	4	1	2	3	8
2015–16	Ravensburg Towerstars	DEL2	40	37	18	55	40	11	7	4	11	14
2016–17	HC TWK Innsbruck	AUT	54	27	28	55	36	4	0	2	2	5
2017–18	HC Bolzano	AUT	28	15	19	34	18	16	4	6	10	12
AHL totals			38	2	4	6	18	—	—	—	—	—
Liiga totals			38	8	8	16	28	—	—	—	—	—

== Awards and honors ==
Award	Year
College
ECAC All-Academic Team	2010, 2011, 2012
ECAC Hockey Player of the Year	2012
All-ECAC Hockey First Team	2012
AHCA East First-Team All-American	2012
DEL2
Best Goal scorer (37)	2016

Awards and achievements
Preceded by Chase Polacek	ECAC Hockey Player of the Year; 2011–12	Succeeded by Eric Hartzell
