= 2007–08 NCAA Division I men's ice hockey season =

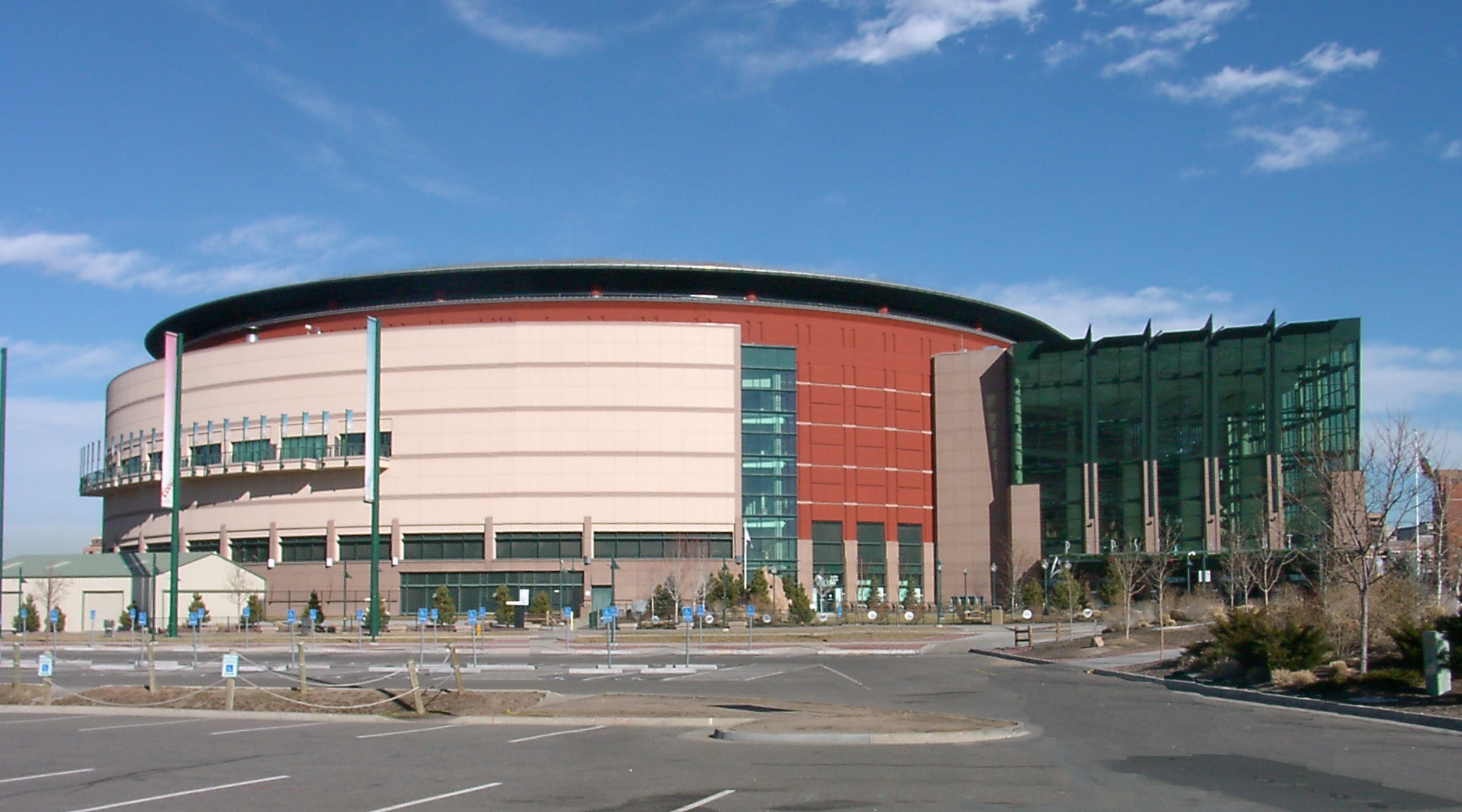
- Pepsi Center in Denver, Colorado hosted the 2008 Frozen Four
- Duration: October 7, 2007– April 12, 2008
- NCAA tournament: 2008
- National championship: Pepsi Center; Denver, Colorado
- NCAA champion: Boston College
- Hobey Baker Award: Kevin Porter (Michigan)

The 2007–08 NCAA Division I men's ice hockey season began on October 7, 2007 and ended with the 2008 NCAA Division I men's ice hockey tournament's championship game on April 12, 2008 at Pepsi Center in Denver, Colorado. Boston College won their third NCAA Division I Men's Ice Hockey Championship, defeating Notre Dame 4–1 in the national championship game. This was the 61st season in which an NCAA ice hockey championship was held and is the 114th year overall where an NCAA school fielded a team.

== Season Outlook ==
=== Pre-season polls ===
The top teams in the nation as ranked before the start of the season.

The U.S. College Hockey Online/College Sports Television poll was voted on by coaches, media, and NHL scouts. The USA Today/USA Hockey Magazine poll was voted on by coaches and media.

USCHO Poll
Rank	Team
1	North Dakota (13)
2	Boston College (3)
3	Michigan State (11)
4	Miami (1)
5	Minnesota (1)
6	New Hampshire
7	Clarkson
8	Notre Dame
9	Boston University
10	Michigan
11	Colorado College
12	Maine
13	Denver
14	Quinnipiac
15	Wisconsin
16	St. Lawrence
17	St. Cloud State
18	Cornell
19	Ohio State
20	Vermont

USA Today Poll
Rank	Team
1	North Dakota (14)
2	Michigan State (14)
3	Boston College
4	Minnesota (3)
5	Miami (2)
6	New Hampshire (1)
7	Clarkson
8	Notre Dame
9	Boston University
10	Michigan
11	Colorado College
12	Denver
13	Maine
14	Wisconsin
15	Quinnipiac

== Regular season ==
=== Standings ===
2007–08 Atlantic Hockey standings
	Conference							Overall					
	GP	W	L	T	PTS	GF	GA	GP	W	L	T	GF	GA
Army†	28	17	8	3	37	84	51	37	19	14	4	101	73
RIT	28	15	8	5	35	87	72	37	19	12	6	116	109
Air Force*	28	14	9	5	33	89	65	39	21	12	6	130	91
Sacred Heart	28	14	11	3	31	91	79	38	16	19	3	111	116
Mercyhurst	28	11	10	7	29	83	89	41	15	19	7	112	133
Canisius	28	10	13	5	25	80	79	37	11	20	6	93	121
Connecticut	28	11	14	3	25	62	84	37	13	21	3	79	126
Bentley	28	9	13	6	24	81	88	36	9	21	6	89	124
Holy Cross	28	9	15	4	22	66	85	36	10	19	7	88	114
American International	28	8	17	3	19	67	98	36	8	23	5	83	135
Championship: Air Force † indicates conference regular season champion * indicates conference tournament champion Final rankings: USA Today/USA Hockey Magazine Top 15 Poll

2007–08 Central Collegiate Hockey Association standings
	Conference							Overall					
	GP	W	L	T	PTS	GF	GA	GP	W	L	T	GF	GA
#2 Michigan†*	28	20	4	4	44	107	62	43	33	6	4	170	89
#5 Miami	28	21	6	1	43	114	56	42	33	8	1	169	78
#7 Michigan State	28	19	6	3	41	92	58	42	25	12	5	135	98
#3 Notre Dame	28	15	9	4	34	74	57	47	27	16	4	136	100
Ferris State	28	12	12	4	28	77	72	39	18	16	5	109	98
Northern Michigan	28	12	13	3	27	76	78	44	20	20	4	116	120
Bowling Green	28	13	15	0	26	73	84	39	18	21	0	105	120
Nebraska–Omaha	28	11	13	4	26	87	99	40	17	19	4	125	142
Alaska	28	0^	28^	0^	20	61	80	35	0^	35^	0^	80	104
Lake Superior State	28	7	15	6	20	65	101	37	10	20	7	91	125
Ohio State	28	7	18	3	17	61	93	41	12	25	4	98	136
Western Michigan	28	4	22	2	10	53	100	38	8	27	3	82	126
Championship: Michigan † indicates conference regular season champion * indicates conference tournament champion Final rankings: USA Today/USA Hockey Magazine Top 15 Poll^ Alaska was retroactively required to forfeit all wins and ties due to player ineligibilities.

2007–08 College Hockey America standings
	Conference							Overall					
	GP	W	L	T	PTS	GF	GA	GP	W	L	T	GF	GA
Bemidji State†	20	13	4	3	29	71	39	36	17	16	3	102	82
Niagara*	20	12	6	2	26	71	51	37	22	11	4	128	98
Robert Morris	20	10	7	3	23	67	67	34	15	15	4	114	127
Wayne State	20	6	14	0	12	54	71	38	11	25	2	90	132
Alabama–Huntsville	20	3	13	4	10	40	75	31	6	21	4	60	117
Championship: Niagara † indicates conference regular season champion * indicates conference tournament champion Final rankings: USA Today/USA Hockey Magazine Top 15 Poll

2007–08 ECAC Hockey standings
	Conference							Overall					
	GP	W	L	T	PTS	GF	GA	GP	W	L	T	GF	GA
#10 Clarkson†	22	15	4	3	33	72	47	39	22	13	4	108	93
#11 Princeton*	22	14	8	0	28	75	57	35	21	14	0	112	95
Harvard	22	12	7	3	27	59	41	34	17	13	4	98	79
Union	22	10	7	5	25	50	57	35	15	14	6	79	91
Cornell	22	12	9	1	25	60	43	36	19	14	3	102	78
Quinnipiac	22	9	9	4	22	62	67	39	20	15	4	120	118
Yale	22	9	9	4	22	58	61	34	16	14	4	93	94
Colgate	22	8	9	5	21	58	55	42	18	18	6	113	104
St. Lawrence	22	7	13	2	16	58	68	37	13	20	4	103	109
Rensselaer	22	6	13	3	15	45	69	38	11	23	4	79	113
Brown	22	6	13	3	15	50	68	31	6	21	4	67	108
Dartmouth	22	6	13	3	15	64	78	32	12	16	4	98	107
Championship: Princeton † indicates conference regular season champion (Cleary Cup) * indicates conference tournament champion (Whitelaw Cup); Final rankings: USA Today/USA Hockey Magazine Top 15 Poll

2007–08 Hockey East standings
	Conference							Overall					
	GP	W	L	T	PTS	GF	GA	GP	W	L	T	GF	GA
#6 New Hampshire†	27	19	5	3	41	84	54	38	25	10	3	132	94
Boston University	27	15	9	3	33	97	72	40	19	17	4	135	117
Vermont	27	13	9	5	31	67	78	39	17	15	7	88	106
#1 Boston College*	27	11	9	7	29	82	67	44	25	11	8	160	101
Providence	27	11	11	5	27	66	66	36	14	17	5	91	99
Northeastern	27	12	13	2	26	73	80	37	16	18	3	92	105
Massachusetts–Lowell	27	10	13	4	24	70	76	37	16	17	4	100	96
Massachusetts	27	9	13	5	23	73	71	36	14	16	6	98	97
Maine	27	9	15	3	21	59	73	34	13	18	3	77	92
Merrimack	27	6	18	3	15	48	82	34	12	18	4	71	93
Championship: Boston College † indicates conference regular season champion * indicates conference tournament champion Final rankings: USA Today/USA Hockey Magazine Top 15 Poll

2007–08 Western Collegiate Hockey Association standings
	Conference							Overall					
	GP	W	L	T	PTS	GF	GA	GP	W	L	T	GF	GA
#8 Colorado College†	28	21	6	1	43	95	52	41	28	12	1	136	88
#4 North Dakota	28	18	7	3	39	85	53	43	28	11	4	129	80
#9 Denver*	28	16	11	1	33	75	67	41	26	14	1	116	94
#15 Minnesota State	28	12	12	4	28	71	75	39	19	16	4	106	97
#14 St. Cloud State	28	12	12	4	28	79	74	40	19	16	5	118	94
#13 Wisconsin	28	11	12	5	27	68	68	40	16	17	7	114	102
#12 Minnesota	28	9	12	7	25	64	70	45	19	17	9	109	109
Minnesota–Duluth	28	9	14	5	23	55	76	36	13	17	6	74	91
Michigan Tech	28	9	15	4	22	55	77	39	14	20	5	78	99
Alaska–Anchorage	28	3	19	6	12	54	89	36	7	21	8	81	112
Championship: Denver † indicates conference regular season champion * indicates conference tournament champion Final rankings: USA Today/USA Hockey Magazine Top 15 Poll

== 2008 NCAA tournament ==
Regional semifinals
1	Michigan	5
4	Niagara	1
East Regional
2	St. Cloud State	1
3	Clarkson	2
1	New Hampshire	3
4	Notre Dame	7
West Regional
2	Colorado College	1
3	Michigan State	3
1	Miami	3*
4	Air Force	2
Northeast Regional
2	Boston College	5
3	Minnesota	2
1	North Dakota	5
4	Princeton	3
Midwest Regional
2	Denver	2
3	Wisconsin	6

Regional Finals
1	Michigan	2
3	Clarkson	0
4	Notre Dame	3
3	Michigan State	1
1	Miami	3
2	Boston College	4*
1	North Dakota	3*
3	Wisconsin	2

Frozen Four
E1	Michigan	4
W4	Notre Dame	5*
NE2	Boston College	6
MW1	North Dakota	1

National championship
W4	Notre Dame	1
NE2	Boston College	4

Note: * denotes overtime period(s)

== Player stats ==
=== Scoring leaders ===
The following players led the league in points at the conclusion of the season.

GP = Games played; G = Goals; A = Assists; Pts = Points; PIM = Penalty minutes

Player	Class	Team	GP	G	A	Pts	PIM
Nathan Gerbe	Junior	Boston College	43	35	33	68	65
Kevin Porter	Senior	Michigan	43	33	30	63	18
Chad Kolarik	Senior	Michigan	39	30	26	56	24
Ryan Lasch	Sophomore	St. Cloud State	40	25	28	53	12
Simon Lambert	Senior	RIT	37	21	30	51	40
Joe Whitney	Freshman	Boston College	44	11	40	51	50
Ben Smith	Sophomore	Boston College	44	25	25	50	12
Ryan Jones	Senior	Miami	42	31	18	49	83
Ryan Cruthers	Senior	Robert Morris	34	22	27	49	40
Matt Fornataro	Senior	New Hampshire	38	18	28	46	52
Vince Rocco	Junior	Niagara	37	14	32	46	10

=== Leading goaltenders ===
The following goaltenders led the league in goals against average at the end of the regular season while playing at least 33% of their team's total minutes.

GP = Games played; Min = Minutes played; W = Wins; L = Losses; OT = Overtime/shootout losses; GA = Goals against; SO = Shutouts; SV% = Save percentage; GAA = Goals against average

Player	Class	Team	GP	Min	W	L	OT	GA	SO	SV%	GAA
Jeff Zatkoff	Junior	Miami	36	2,161:26	27	8	1	62	3	.933	1.72
Jean-Philippe Lamoureux	Senior	North Dakota	42	2,507:38	27	11	4	73	6	.932	1.75
Richard Bachman	Freshman	Colorado College	35	2,102:47	25	9	1	65	4	.931	1.85
Josh Kassel	Junior	Army	30	1,754:09	18	10	2	56	5	.925	1.92
Billy Sauer	Junior	Michigan	38	2,271:35	30	4	3	74	4	.924	1.95
Alex Kangas	Freshman	Minnesota	31	1,966:45	12	10	9	65	0	.930	1.98
Ben Scrivens	Sophomore	Cornell	35	1,964:49	19	12	3	66	4	.930	2.02
Jordan Pearce	Junior	Notre Dame	43	2,558:00	23	15	4	87	2	.914	2.04
Mike Zacharias	Junior	Minnesota State	36	2,221:13	18	13	4	77	5	.924	2.08
Andrew Volkening	Sophomore	Air Force	39	2,271:05	21	11	6	79	4	.911	2.09

== Awards ==
=== NCAA ===
Award		Recipient
Hobey Baker Memorial Award		Kevin Porter, Michigan
Spencer T. Penrose Award		Red Berenson, Michigan
Tournament Most Outstanding Player		Nathan Gerbe, Boston College
National Rookie of the Year		Richard Bachman, Colorado College
Derek Hines Unsung Hero Award		Chase Podsiad, Army
Lowe's Senior CLASS Award		Landis Stankievech, Princeton
AHCA All-American Teams
East First Team	Position	West First Team
Kevin Regan, New Hampshire	G	Richard Bachman, Colorado College
Matt Gilroy, Boston University	D	Tyler Eckford, Alaska
Mike Moore, Princeton	D	Jack Hillen, Colorado College
Nathan Gerbe, Boston College	F	Ryan Jones, Miami
Lee Jubinville, Princeton	F	T. J. Oshie, North Dakota
Mike Radja, New Hampshire	F	Kevin Porter, Michigan
East Second Team	Position	West Second Team
Josh Kassel, Army	G	Jeff Lerg, Michigan State
Grant Clitsome, Clarkson	D	Chris Butler, Denver
Brad Flaishans, New Hampshire	D	Alec Martinez, Miami
Bryan Ewing, Boston University	F	Chad Kolarik, Michigan
Matt Fornataro, New Hampshire	F	Ryan Lasch, St. Cloud State
Pete MacArthur, Boston University	F	Chad Rau, Colorado College

=== Atlantic Hockey ===
Award		Recipient
Player of the Year		Josh Kassel, Army
Best Defensive Forward		David Kasch, Canisius
Best Defenseman		Zach McKelvie, Army
Rookie of the Year		Erik Peterson, Bentley
Regular Season Goaltending Award		Josh Kassel, Army
Coach of the Year		Brian Riley, Army
Most Valuable Player in Tournament		Brent Olson, Air Force
Individual Sportsmanship		Alexandre Parent, Sacred Heart
Regular Season Scoring Trophy		Simon Lambert, RIT
All-Atlantic Hockey Teams
First Team	Position	Second Team
Josh Kassel, Army	G	Beau Erickson, Connecticut
Zach McKelvie, Army	D	Scott Marchesi, Sacred Heart
Dan Ringwald, RIT	D	Greg Flynn, Air Force
Simon Lambert, RIT	F	Owen Meyer, Army
Alexandre Parent, Sacred Heart	F	Ben Cottreau, Mercyhurst
Luke Flicek, Army	F	Bear Trapp, Sacred Heart
Third Team	Position	Rookie Team
Joe Calvi, Bentley	G	Joe Calvi, Bentley
Bobby Raymond, RIT	D	Jeff Terminesi, Mercyhurst
Matt Burke, Holy Cross	D	Mark Znutas, Holy Cross
Eric Ehn, Air Force	F	Everett Sheen, Holy Cross
Brodie Sheahan, Holy Cross	F	Vincent Scarsella, Canisius
Jereme Tendler, American International	F	Erik Peterson, Bentley

=== CCHA ===
Awards		Recipient
Player of the Year		Kevin Porter, Michigan
Best Defensive Forward		Justin Abdelkader, Michigan State
Best Defensive Defenseman		Alec Martinez, Miami
Best Offensive Defenseman		Tyler Eckford, Alaska
Rookie of the Year		Max Pacioretty, Michigan
Best Goaltender		Jeff Zatkoff, Miami
Coach of the Year		Red Berenson, Michigan
Terry Flanagan Memorial Award		Dan VeNard, Notre Dame
Ilitch Humanitarian Award		Justin Abdelkader, Michigan State
Perani Cup Champion		Kevin Porter, Michigan
Scholar-Athlete of the Year		Jeff Lerg Michigan State
Most Valuable Player in Tournament		Tim Miller, Michigan
All-CCHA Teams
First Team	Position	Second Team
Jeff Lerg, Michigan State	G	Jeff Zatkoff, Miami
Tyler Eckford, Alaska	D	Mitch Ganzak, Miami
Alec Martinez, Miami	D	Mark Mitera, Michigan
Kevin Porter, Michigan	F	Bryan Marshall, Nebraska-Omaha
Ryan Jones, Miami	F	Derek Whitmore, Bowling Green
Chad Kolarik, Michigan	F	Tim Kennedy, Michigan State
Rookie Team	Position	
Nick Eno, Bowling Green	G	
Erik Gustafsson, Northern Michigan	D	
Jeff Petry, Michigan State	D	
Carter Camper, Miami	F	
Max Pacioretty, Michigan	F	
Jacob Cepis, Bowling Green	F	
Mark Olver, Northern Michigan	F	

=== CHA ===
Award		Recipient
Player of the Year		Ryan Cruthers, Robert Morris
Rookie of the Year		Matt Read, Bemidji State
Coach of the Year		Tom Serratore, Bemidji State
Student-Athlete of the Year		Joel Gasper, Robert Morris
Easton Three-Star Player of the Year		Ryan Cruthers, Robert Morris
Most Valuable Player in Tournament		Ted Cook, Niagara
All-CHA Teams
First Team	Position	Second Team
Juliano Pagliero, Niagara	G	Matt Climie, Bemidji State
Jeff Caister, Wayne State	D	Tyler Gotto, Niagara
Cody Bostock, Bemidji State	D	
Ryan Annesley, Niagara	D	
Ryan Cruthers, Robert Morris	F	Matt Caruana, Niagara
Vince Rocco, Niagara	F	Travis Winter, Bemidji State
Stavros Paskaris, Wayne State	F	Chris Margott, Robert Morris
Rookie Team	Position	
Adam Avramenko, Niagara	G	
Denny Urban, Robert Morris	D	
Ryan Adams, Wayne State	D	
Matt Read, Bemidji State	F	
Nathan Longpre, Robert Morris	F	
Andrew Coburn, Alabama-Huntsville	F	

=== ECAC ===
Award		Recipient
Player of the Year		Lee Jubinville, Princeton
Rookie of the Year		Riley Nash, Cornell
Tim Taylor Award		Guy Gadowsky, Princeton
Best Defensive Forward		Nick Dodge, Clarkson
Best Defensive Defenseman		Mike Moore, Princeton
Ken Dryden Award		Kyle Richter, Harvard
Student-Athlete of the Year		Landis Stankievech, Princeton
Most Outstanding Player in Tournament		Zane Kalemba, Princeton
All-ECAC Hockey Teams
First Team	Position	Second Team
Kyle Richter, Harvard	G	David Leggio, Clarkson
Grant Clitsome, Clarkson	D	Lane Caffaro, Union
Mike Moore, Princeton	D	Sean Hurley, Brown
Nick Johnson, Dartmouth	F	Tyler Burton, Colgate
Lee Jubinville, Princeton	F	Colin Greening, Cornell
Steve Zalewski, Clarkson	F	Brett Wilson, Princeton
Third Team	Position	Rookie Team
Mark Dekanich, Colgate	G	Corey Milan, Union
Alex Biega, Harvard	D	Mike Devin, Cornell
Evan Stephens, Dartmouth	D	Evan Stephens, Dartmouth
Sean Backman, Yale	F	Riley Nash, Cornell
Matt Beca, Clarkson	F	Chase Polacek, Rensselaer
Jesse Winchester, Colgate	F	Adam Presizniuk, Union

=== Hockey East ===
Award		Recipient
Player of the Year		Kevin Regan, New Hampshire
Rookie of the Year		Colin Wilson, Boston University
Bob Kullen Coach of the Year Award		Kevin Sneddon, Vermont
Len Ceglarski Award		Chris Higgins, Boston University
Best Defensive Forward		Matt Greene, Boston College
Best Defensive Defenseman		Joe Charlebois, New Hampshire
Three-Stars Award		Bryan Ewing, Boston University
William Flynn Tournament Most Valuable Player		Nathan Gerbe, Boston College
All-Hockey East Teams
First Team	Position	Second Team
Kevin Regan, New Hampshire	G	Ben Bishop, Maine
Brad Flaishans, New Hampshire	D	Mike Kostka, Massachusetts
Matt Gilroy, Boston University	D	Craig Switzer, New Hampshire
	D	Matt Taormina, Providence
Nathan Gerbe, Boston College	F	Kory Falite, Massachusetts-Lowell
Bryan Ewing, Boston University	F	Matt Fornataro, New Hampshire
Pete MacArthur, Boston University	F	Joe Vitale, Northeastern
Mike Radja, New Hampshire	F	
Rookie Team	Position	
Paul Dainton, Massachusetts	G	
Maury Edwards, Massachusetts-Lowell	D	
Kevin Shattenkirk, Boston University	D	
James Marcou, Massachusetts	F	
Joe Whitney, Boston College	F	
James van Riemsdyk, New Hampshire	F	
Colin Wilson, Boston University	F	

=== WCHA ===
Award		Recipient
Player of the Year		Richard Bachman, Colorado College
Defensive Player of the Year		Jack Hillen, Colorado College
Rookie of the Year		Richard Bachman, Colorado College
Student-Athlete of the Year		Joel Hanson, Minnesota State
Coach of the Year		Troy Jutting, Minnesota State
Most Valuable Player in Tournament		Alex Kangas, Minnesota
All-WCHA Teams
First Team	Position	Second Team
Richard Bachman, Colorado College	G	Jean-Philippe Lamoureux, North Dakota
Jack Hillen, Colorado College	D	Chris Butler, Denver
Taylor Chorney, North Dakota	D	Chay Genoway, North Dakota
Chad Rau, Colorado College	F	Andreas Nödl, St. Cloud State
T. J. Oshie, North Dakota	F	Ryan Duncan, North Dakota
Ryan Lasch, St. Cloud State	F	Garrett Roe, St. Cloud State
Third Team	Position	Rookie Team
Peter Mannino, Denver	G	Richard Bachman, Colorado College
Robbie Bina, North Dakota	D	Ryan McDonagh, Wisconsin
Jamie McBain, Wisconsin	D	Cade Fairchild, Minnesota
Tyler Bozak, Denver	F	Kyle Turris, Wisconsin
Blake Wheeler, Minnesota	F	Tyler Bozak, Denver
Kyle Turris, Wisconsin	F	Garrett Roe, St. Cloud State

== 2008 NHL entry draft ==
Round	Pick	Player	College	Conference	NHL team
1	7	Colin Wilson	Boston University	Hockey East	Nashville Predators
1	16	Joe Colborne ^{†}	Denver	WCHA	Boston Bruins
1	17	Jake Gardiner ^{†}	Wisconsin	WCHA	Anaheim Ducks
1	29	Daultan Leveille ^{†}	Michigan State	CCHA	Atlanta Thrashers
2	36	Corey Trivino ^{†}	Boston University	Hockey East	New York Islanders
2	37	Cody Goloubef	Wisconsin	WCHA	Columbus Blue Jackets
2	40	Aaron Ness ^{†}	Minnesota	WCHA	New York Islanders
2	42	Patrick Wiercioch ^{†}	Denver	WCHA	Ottawa Senators
2	43	Justin Schultz ^{†}	Wisconsin	WCHA	Anaheim Ducks
2	45	Zac Dalpe ^{†}	Ohio State	CCHA	Carolina Hurricanes
2	51	Derek Stepan ^{†}	Wisconsin	WCHA	New York Rangers
2	52	Brandon Burlon ^{†}	Michigan	CCHA	New Jersey Devils
2	56	Danny Kristo ^{†}	North Dakota	WCHA	Montreal Canadiens
2	60	Jimmy Hayes ^{†}	Boston College	Hockey East	Toronto Maple Leafs
3	62	Justin Daniels ^{†}	Northeastern	Hockey East	San Jose Sharks
3	63	Robbie Czarnik ^{†}	Michigan	CCHA	Los Angeles Kings
3	66	David Toews ^{†}	North Dakota	WCHA	New York Islanders
3	81	Corey Fienhage ^{†}	North Dakota	WCHA	Buffalo Sabres
3	86	Steve Quailer ^{†}	Northeastern	Hockey East	Pittsburgh Penguins
3	89	Scott Winkler ^{†}	Colorado College	WCHA	Dallas Stars
3	91	Max Nicastro ^{†}	Boston University	Hockey East	Detroit Red Wings
4	94	Vinny Saponari ^{†}	Boston University	Hockey East	Atlanta Thrashers
4	95	David Warsofsky ^{†}	Boston University	Hockey East	St. Louis Blues
4	96	Matt Donovan ^{†}	Denver	WCHA	New York Islanders
4	101	Justin Jokinen ^{†}	Minnesota State	WCHA	Buffalo Sabres
4	108	Nick Larson ^{†}	Notre Dame	CCHA	Calgary Flames
4	113	Ryan Hegarty ^{†}	Maine	Hockey East	Anaheim Ducks
4	115	Sean Lorenz ^{†}	Notre Dame	CCHA	Minnesota Wild
4	118	Drew Olson ^{†}	Minnesota–Duluth	WCHA	Columbus Blue Jackets
4	119	Derek Grant ^{†}	Michigan State	CCHA	Ottawa Senators
4	121	Gustav Nyquist ^{†}	Maine	Hockey East	Detroit Red Wings
5	128	Greg Pateryn ^{†}	Michigan	CCHA	Toronto Maple Leafs
5	136	Taylor Stefishen ^{†}	Ohio State	CCHA	Nashville Predators
5	139	Mark Borowiecki ^{†}	Clarkson	ECAC Hockey	Ottawa Senators
5	140	Mark Olver	Northern Michigan	WCHA	Colorado Avalanche
5	151	Julien Cayer ^{†}	Clarkson	ECAC Hockey	Detroit Red Wings
6	157	Cam Atkinson ^{†}	Boston College	Hockey East	Columbus Blue Jackets
6	158	Grant Rollheiser ^{†}	Boston University	Hockey East	Toronto Maple Leafs
6	159	Brett Hextall ^{†}	North Dakota	WCHA	Phoenix Coyotes
6	160	Luke Witkowski ^{†}	Western Michigan	CCHA	Tampa Bay Lightning
6	166	Jeff Foss	Rensselaer	ECAC Hockey	Nashville Predators
6	169	Ben Smith	Boston College	Hockey East	Chicago Blackhawks
6	172	David Wohlberg ^{†}	Michigan	CCHA	New Jersey Devils
6	173	Nick Tremblay ^{†}	Clarkson	ECAC Hockey	Boston Bruins
6	174	Greg Burke ^{†}	New Hampshire	Hockey East	Washington Capitals
6	177	Tommy Wingels	Miami	CCHA	San Jose Sharks
6	179	Braden Birch ^{†}	Cornell	ECAC Hockey	Chicago Blackhawks
7	183	Garrett Roe	St. Cloud State	WCHA	Los Angeles Kings
7	184	Zach Redmond ^{†}	Ferris State	CCHA	Atlanta Thrashers
7	185	Paul Karpowich ^{†}	Clarkson	ECAC Hockey	St. Louis Blues
7	187	Sean Collins ^{†}	Cornell	ECAC Hockey	Columbus Blue Jackets
7	188	Andrew MacWilliam ^{†}	North Dakota	WCHA	Toronto Maple Leafs
7	190	Matt Bartkowski ^{†}	Ohio State	CCHA	Florida Panthers
7	192	Joe Gleason ^{†}	North Dakota	WCHA	Chicago Blackhawks
7	194	Drew Daniels ^{†}	Northeastern	Hockey East	San Jose Sharks
7	197	Mark Goggin ^{†}	Dartmouth	ECAC Hockey	Boston Bruins
7	200	Nate Condon ^{†}	Minnesota	WCHA	Colorado Avalanche
7	203	David Carle ^{†}	Denver	WCHA	Tampa Bay Lightning
7	206	Patrick Johnson	Wisconsin	WCHA	Montreal Canadiens
7	208	Nick Pryor ^{†}	Maine	Hockey East	Anaheim Ducks
7	209	Mike Bergin ^{†}	Rensselaer	ECAC Hockey	Dallas Stars
7	210	Nick D'Agostino ^{†}	Cornell	ECAC Hockey	Pittsburgh Penguins

† incoming freshman

== See also ==
- 2007–08 NCAA Division III men's ice hockey season
