= Bryan Leitch =

Canadian ice hockey player

- Born: June 17, 1984 (age 41) Coquitlam, British Columbia, Canada
- Height: 6 ft 1 in (185 cm)
- Weight: 190 lb (86 kg; 13 st 8 lb)
- Position: Left wing
- Shot: Left
- Played for: ECHL; Cincinnati Cyclones; Alaska Aces; Florida Everblades; Kalamazoo Wings; Toledo Walleye; Victoria Salmon Kings
- NHL draft: Undrafted
- Playing career: 2009–2010

Bryan Leitch (born June 17, 1984) is a former Canadian professional ice hockey player who played the 2009-10 season in the ECHL.

Born in Coquitlam, British Columbia, Leitch played three seasons of junior hockey in the British Columbia Hockey League with the Coquitlam Express and Merritt Centennials before attending Quinnipiac University where he played four seasons with the Quinnipiac Bobcats men's ice hockey team, which competes in NCAA's Division I in the ECAC conference. He made an immediate impact in ECAC and was named the ECAC Rookie of the Year for the 2005–06 season.

In four seasons as a Bobcat, Leitch clicked for 169 points and 124 penalty minutes in 157 games, including his senior year (2008–09) when he registered 59 points to earn the title as the top scorer in NCAA Division I in ice hockey, and was a finalist for the Hobey Baker Award awarded to the NCAA men's top ice hockey player.

Following his standout college career, Leitch signed with the Milwaukee Admirals of the American Hockey League and was assigned to the Cincinnati Cyclones of the ECHL where he began the 2009–10 season.

Leitch currently resides in Hamden, CT.

== Awards and honours ==
Award	Year
College
All-ECAC Hockey Rookie Team	2005–06
All-ECAC Hockey Second team	2008–09
NCAA finalist for the Hobey Baker Award	2008–09

Awards and achievements
Preceded by Joe Fallon	ECAC Hockey Rookie of the Year; 2005–06	Succeeded by Sean Backman; Brandon Wong
Preceded by Nathan Gerbe	NCAA Ice Hockey Scoring Champion; 2008–09	Succeeded by Gustav Nyquist
