= Zane Kalemba =

American ice hockey player (born 1985)

- Born: December 19, 1985 (age 40) Saddle Brook, New Jersey, U.S.
- Height: 5 ft 11 in (180 cm)
- Weight: 185 lb (84 kg; 13 st 3 lb)
- Position: Goaltender
- Caught: Left
- Played for: Missouri Mavericks (CHL); Elmira Jackals (ECHL); Reading Royals (ECHL); Stockton Thunder (ECHL); Missouri Mavericks (CHL); Rungsted Cobras (Metal Ligaen); Manchester Storm (EIHL)
- NHL draft: Undrafted
- Playing career: 2010–2018

Zane Kalemba (born December 19, 1985) is an American former professional ice hockey goaltender who most recently for Manchester Storm in the Elite Ice Hockey League.

Kalemba grew up in Saddle Brook, New Jersey. He played youth hockey with the New Jersey Devils Youth Hockey Club where he won a USA Hockey Bantam National Championship in 2001. He attended Bergen Catholic High School before transferring to the Hotchkiss School at the start of his sophomore year.

Prior to turning professional, Kalemba attended the Princeton University where he played four seasons with the Princeton Tigers men's ice hockey team which competes in NCAA's Division I in the ECAC conference.

On March 8, 2018, Kalemba signed an emergency professional tryout contract with the Winnipeg Jets of the National Hockey League after goaltender Michael Hutchinson's flight was delayed, causing him to arrive late to the game.

== Awards and honors ==
Award	Year
College
ECAC Hockey All-Tournament Team	2008
All-ECAC Hockey First Team	2008–09
AHCA East Second-Team All-American	2008–09

Awards and achievements
Preceded by Chris D'Alvise	ECAC Hockey Most Outstanding Player in Tournament; 2008	Succeeded by Sean Backman
Preceded by Lee Jubinville	ECAC Hockey Player of the Year; 2008–09	Succeeded by Chase Polacek
Preceded by Kyle Richter	Ken Dryden Award; 2008–09	Succeeded by Ben Scrivens
