= Ben Scrivens =

Canadian ice hockey player (born 1986)

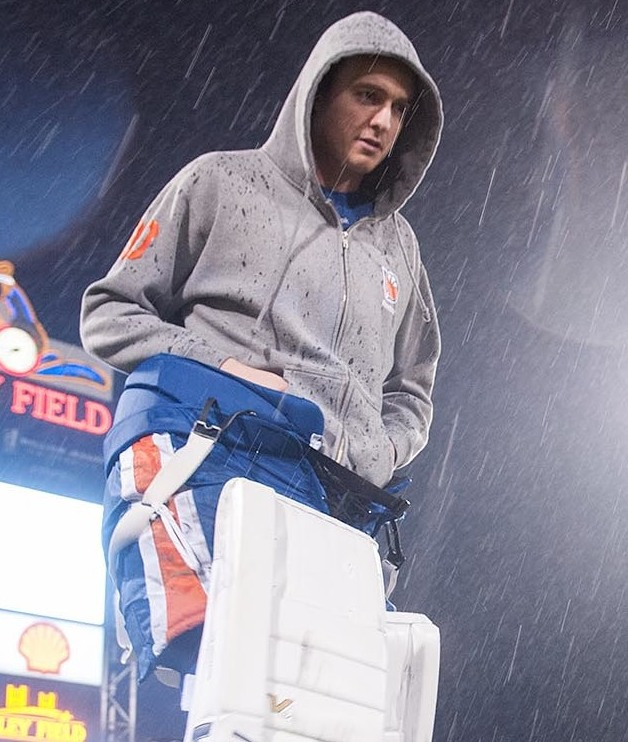
- Scrivens in 2015
- Born: September 11, 1986 (age 40) Spruce Grove, Alberta, Canada
- Height: 6 ft 2 in (188 cm)
- Weight: 181 lb (82 kg; 12 st 13 lb)
- Position: Goaltender
- Caught: Left
- Played for: Toronto Maple Leafs; Los Angeles Kings; Edmonton Oilers; Montreal Canadiens; HC Dinamo Minsk; Salavat Yulaev Ufa
- National team: Canada
- NHL draft: Undrafted
- Playing career: 2010–2018

Benjamin John Scrivens (born September 11, 1986) is a Canadian professional ice hockey executive and former player. He is the current team manager of the University of Denver Pioneers. Scrivens has played in the National Hockey League (NHL) for the Toronto Maple Leafs, Los Angeles Kings, Edmonton Oilers, and Montreal Canadiens.

He played four years with the Cornell Big Red of the ECAC Hockey. After his senior season, Scrivens was named a first team All-American, ECAC Goaltender of the Year and was one of 10 finalists for the Hobey Baker Award. He started his professional career with the Reading Royals of the ECHL, before being called up to join the Toronto Marlies of the American Hockey League (AHL) at the end of the 2010–11 AHL season.

== Playing career ==
=== Junior ===
Scrivens played in the Alberta Junior Hockey League (AJHL) for two seasons. He broke into the league with the Drayton Valley Thunder during the 2004–05 season, playing a single game with the team before moving on to the Calgary Canucks. During his final year of junior hockey, Scrivens played with the Spruce Grove Saints. He won 27 games, while losing 12 and tying three, finishing the year with a 2.43 goals against average (GAA) and .921 save percentage. He was named the Saints' Most Valuable Player and Player of the Year for the 2005–06 season. Scrivens played in the AJHL All-Star game, and represented Team North at the 2006 Viking Cup, where they won the championship.

=== College ===
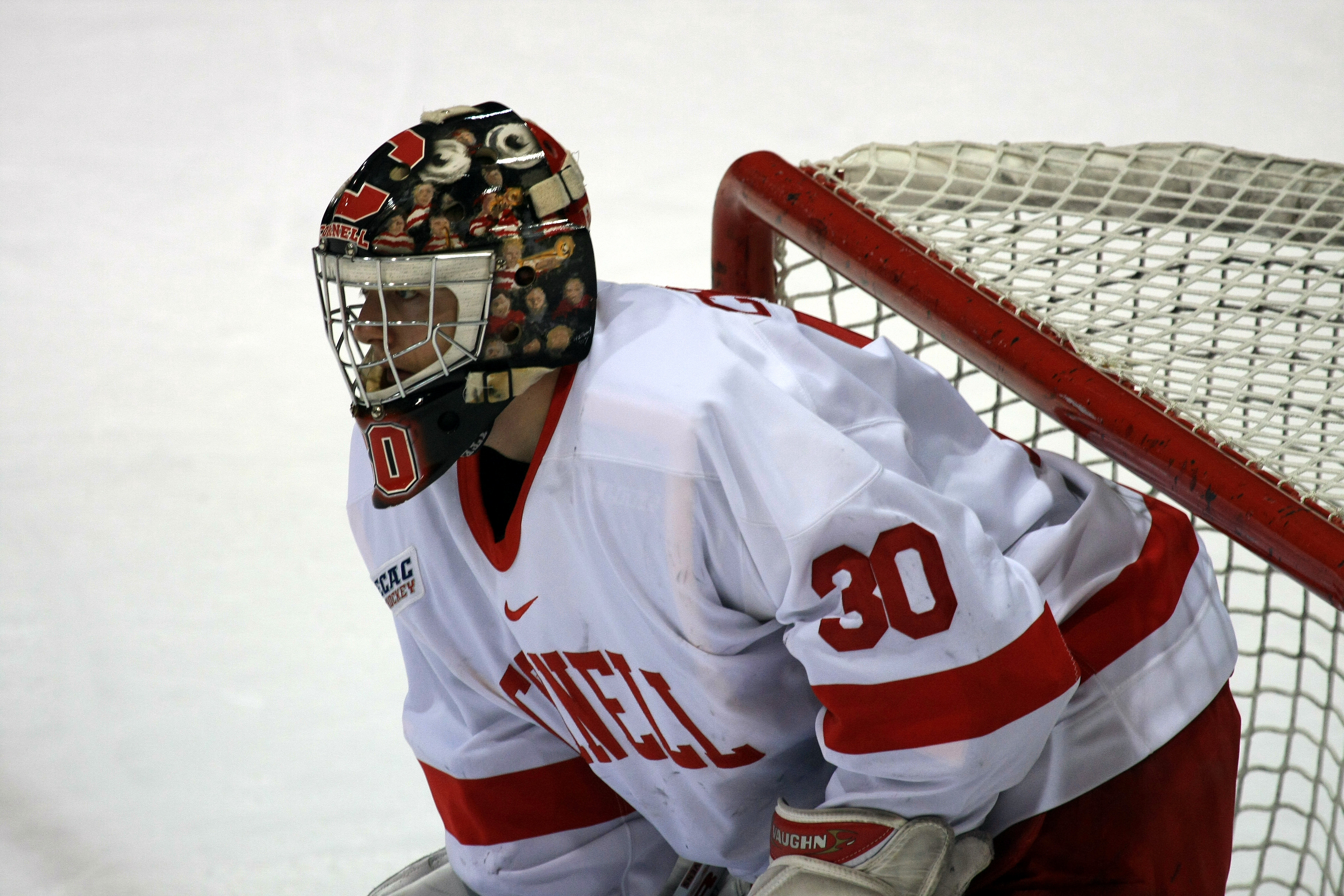
At Cornell in 2009

Scrivens joined the Cornell Big Red for the 2006–07 season. He played in 12 games, starting eight and recording three wins. He recorded his first collegiate shutout in a 6–0 win against Union College. During his sophomore season at Cornell, Scrivens established himself as the team's starting goaltender, playing in 35 of the team's 36 games. For the week of December 3, 2007, Scrivens was named the ECAC Hockey goaltender of the week. He was an honorable mention All-Ivy League after the season. He won 19 games, and finished with a 2.30 GAA and .911 save percentage. Scrivens retained his starting job with the Big Red during his junior season, and joined the ranks of top NCAA goaltenders across the country. He played in 36 games with the Big Red, recording 22 wins, a GAA of 1.81 and a .931 save percentage. Scrivens picked up many awards for his playing during the 2008–09 season, including being named the National Player of the Week for the first week of the season, as well as second team All-ECAC and an honorable mention All-Ivy League at the end of the season. He was also tapped as a member of Quill and Dagger at the conclusion of the season.

Scrivens' senior season with the Big Red saw him earn First Team All-American honors, while playing in 34 games and winning 21. He had a 1.87 GAA and a .934 save percentage. Scrivens captured the Ken Dryden Trophy as ECAC goaltender of the year, and was named one of ten finalists for the Hobey Baker Award. He finished his collegiate career with 19 shutouts, fourth all-time in NCAA history.

=== Professional ===
==== Toronto Maple Leafs ====
After completing his collegiate career, and as an unrestricted free agent, Scrivens signed a one-year contract with the Toronto Maple Leafs on April 28, 2010. Scrivens signed with Toronto largely due to the presence of goaltending coach François Allaire, with whom Scrivens had worked during an off-season goaltender camp.

Scrivens started the 2010–11 season with the Reading Royals of the ECHL, the Maple Leafs' second tier affiliate. He played in 13 games with the Royals, winning 10. For his efforts he was selected to represent the Royals in the ECHL All-Star Classic. His strong play at the ECHL level, and injuries to other goaltenders in the Maple Leafs systems, earned Scrivens two separate callups to the Toronto Marlies of the American Hockey League (AHL), one in November and one in February. Scrivens was one of two goaltenders on the Marlies Clear Day roster announced on March 8, 2011, meaning he would be spending the remainder of the season at the AHL level, barring injury or suspension.

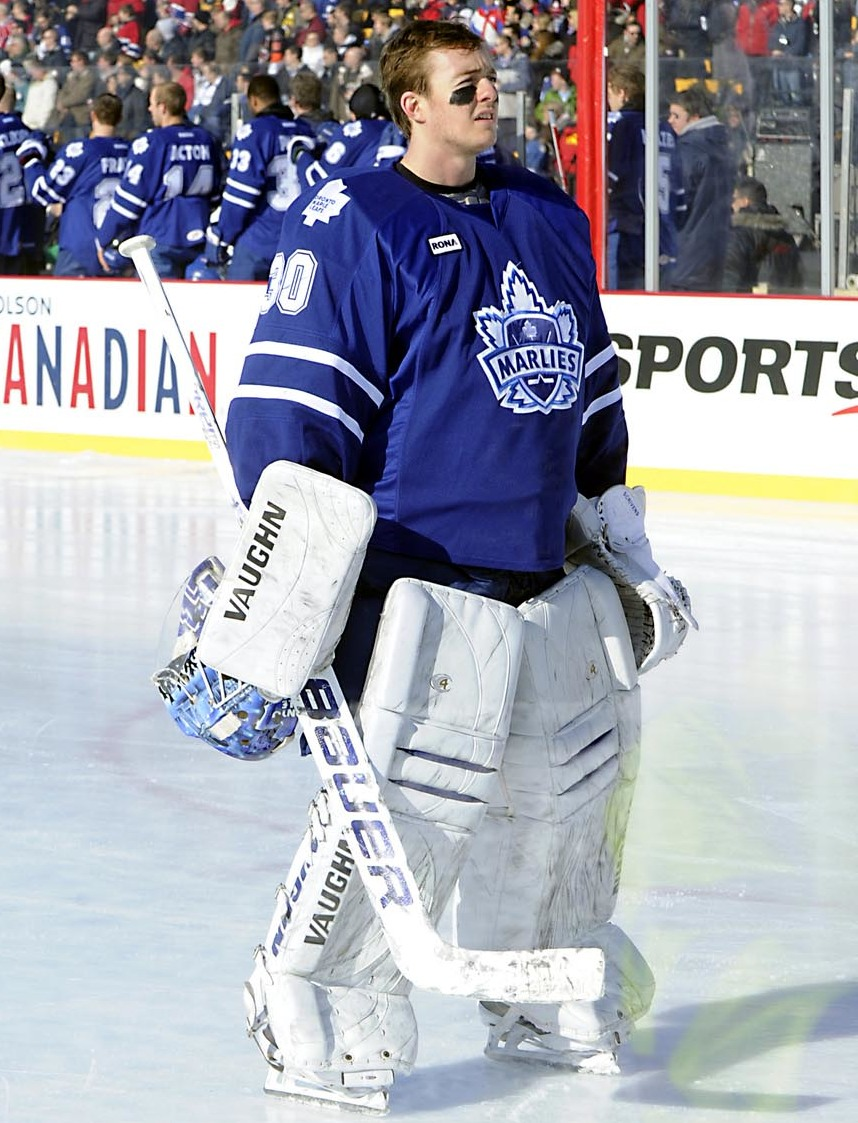
Scrivens with the Toronto Marlies in 2012

The Maple Leafs re-signed Scrivens on July 1, 2011. He was called up to the NHL as of October 24, in an emergency situation. After serving as backup for the previous games, he made his first regular season start on November 3, against the Columbus Blue Jackets. In that game, he recorded his first career win and stopped 38 shots in a 4–1 game. As the NHL resumed play after the 2012–13 NHL lockout, Scrivens became a full-time NHL goaltender for the first time, serving as the backup to James Reimer, starting Toronto's first two games. Scrivens recorded his first NHL career shutout on February 16, 2013, in a 3–0 victory over the Ottawa Senators.

==== Los Angeles Kings ====
Scrivens was traded to the Los Angeles Kings in June 2013 along with Matt Frattin and a second-round pick in exchange for goaltender Jonathan Bernier. Scrivens served as the backup goaltender to Jonathan Quick. On November 12, Scrivens relieved an injured Quick with 1:20 remaining in overtime against the Buffalo Sabres. Scrivens then started the next three games, posting 23 saves in a 3–2 comeback victory over the New York Islanders on November 14, and recording consecutive shutouts against the New Jersey Devils on November 15 (with 26 saves), and the New York Rangers on November 17 (with 37 saves). Shortly after Quick's return in January 2014, however, Scrivens became expendable due to the play of third goaltender Martin Jones, and he was subsequently traded to the Edmonton Oilers for a third-round pick in the 2014 NHL entry draft (later traded away, ultimately used to select Dominic Turgeon).

==== Edmonton Oilers ====
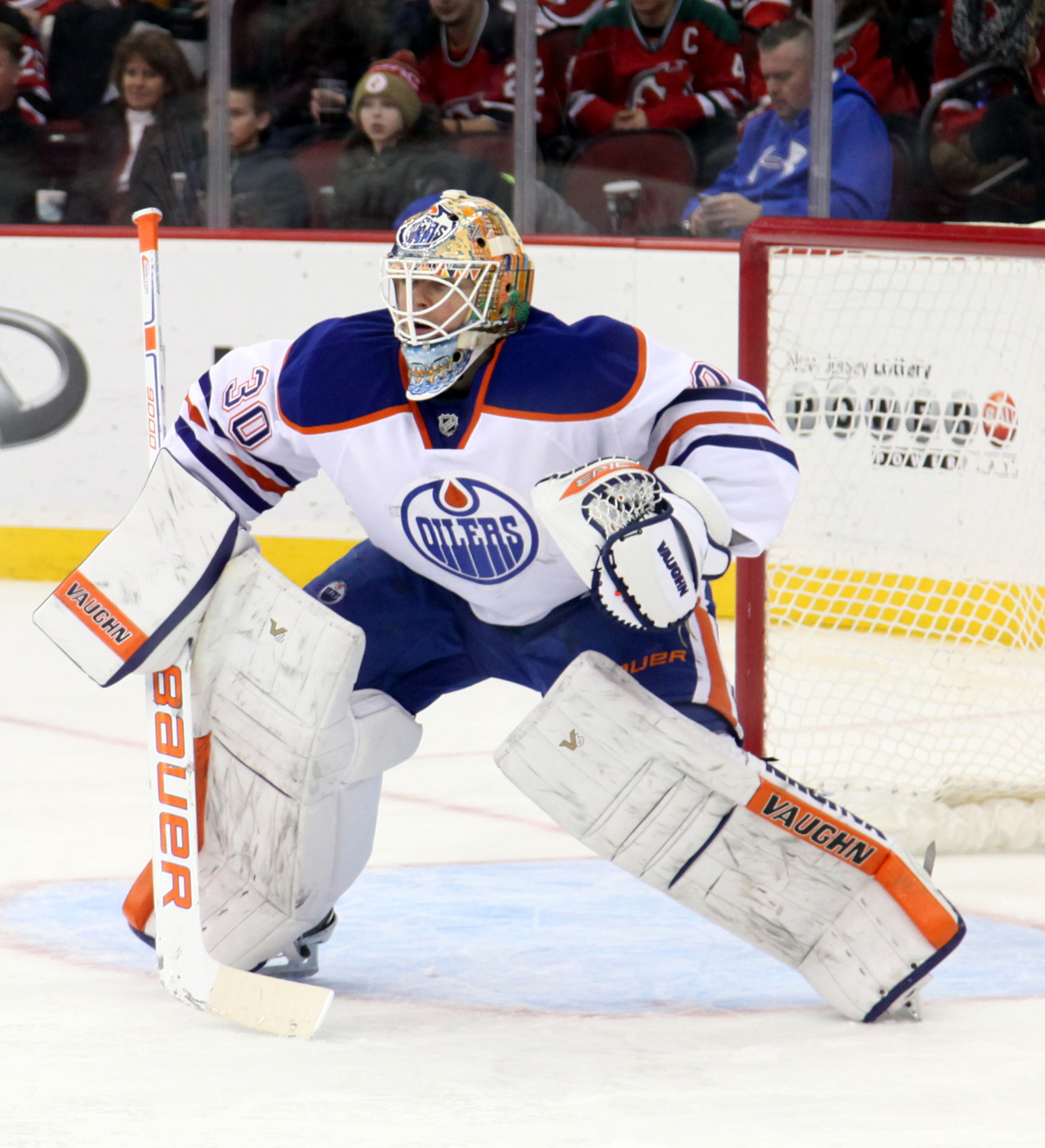
Scrivens with the Oilers in 2015

On January 29, 2014, Scrivens set the NHL record for most saves by a goaltender in a regular season shutout, stopping 59 shots from the San Jose Sharks during 60 minutes of regulation time, leading the Oilers to a 3–0 victory. Scrivens also set an Oilers franchise record in the process for most saves in a game, surpassing the previous record of 56 set by Bill Ranford in 1993.

The Oilers re-signed Scrivens to a two-year contract worth $2.3 million per season on March 3, 2014.

==== Montreal Canadiens ====
On December 28, 2015, Scrivens was traded to the Montreal Canadiens in exchange for forward Zack Kassian.

==== KHL ====
On July 14, 2016, Scrivens agreed to a one-year contract with HC Dinamo Minsk of the Kontinental Hockey League (KHL) for the 2016–17 season. He played for Salavat Yulaev Ufa in the 2017–18 season after which he announced his retirement.

== Post-retirement ==
On September 9, 2018, Scrivens announced he would be managing the University of Denver's men's ice hockey team as he pursued a master's degree at the school.

== International play ==
Medal record

Representing Canada

Ice hockey

Olympic Games
Bronze medal – third place	2018 Pyeongchang	

Scrivens was invited and accepted to play for Canada national team at the 2014 World Championship. In his international tournament debut, he finished as Canada's starting goaltender in the quarterfinals loss to Finland. Canada finished the tournament in fifth place.

Scrivens played for Canada's bronze medal-winning team at the 2018 Winter Olympics. He appeared in three games and recorded a 1.61 GAA before suffering an injury in the quarterfinal game against Finland.

== Personal life ==
Scrivens is from Spruce Grove. He is the middle child of Wayne and Dawna Scrivens, with an older brother, Adam, and a younger sister, Bronwyn. While playing ice hockey at Cornell, Scrivens studied hotel administration. He is married to Jenny Scrivens since June 2012, also an ice hockey goaltender.

== Career statistics ==
=== Regular season and playoffs ===
			Regular season									Playoffs
Season	Team	League	GP	W	L	OTL	MIN	GA	SO	GAA	SV%	GP	W	L	MIN	GA	SO	GAA	SV%
2004–05	Drayton Valley Thunder	AJHL	1	0	1	0	59	3	0	3.03	—	—	—	—	—	—	—	—	—
2004–05	Calgary Canucks	AJHL	16	7	3	3	857	43	1	3.01	—	—	—	—	—	—	—	—	—
2005–06	Spruce Grove Saints	AJHL	45	27	12	2	2,469	100	3	2.43	—	13	9	4	777	37	2	2.86	—
2006–07	Cornell Big Red	NCAA	12	3	6	2	574	22	1	2.30	.911	—	—	—	—	—	—	—	—
2007–08	Cornell Big Red	NCAA	35	19	12	3	1,965	66	4	2.02	.930	—	—	—	—	—	—	—	—
2008–09	Cornell Big Red	NCAA	36	22	10	4	2,152	65	7	1.81	.931	—	—	—	—	—	—	—	—
2009–10	Cornell Big Red	NCAA	34	21	9	4	2,018	63	7	1.87	.934	—	—	—	—	—	—	—	—
2010–11	Reading Royals	ECHL	13	10	3	0	779	29	0	2.23	.938	3	0	1	107	9	0	5.04	.873
2010–11	Toronto Marlies	AHL	33	13	12	5	1,930	75	2	2.33	.924	—	—	—	—	—	—	—	—
2011–12	Toronto Marlies	AHL	39	22	15	1	2,293	78	4	2.04	.926	17	11	6	1,030	33	3	1.92	.935
2011–12	Toronto Maple Leafs	NHL	12	4	5	2	672	35	0	3.13	.902	—	—	—	—	—	—	—	—
2012–13	Toronto Maple Leafs	NHL	20	7	9	2	1,025	46	2	2.69	.915	—	—	—	—	—	—	—	—
2013–14	Los Angeles Kings	NHL	19	7	5	4	975	32	3	1.97	.931	—	—	—	—	—	—	—	—
2013–14	Edmonton Oilers	NHL	21	9	11	0	1,235	62	1	3.01	.916	—	—	—	—	—	—	—	—
2014–15	Edmonton Oilers	NHL	57	15	26	11	3,228	170	1	3.16	.890	—	—	—	—	—	—	—	—
2015–16	Bakersfield Condors	AHL	10	2	6	1	554	32	1	3.47	.893	—	—	—	—	—	—	—	—
2015–16	Montreal Canadiens	NHL	15	5	8	0	822	42	0	3.07	.906	—	—	—	—	—	—	—	—
2015–16	St. John's IceCaps	AHL	1	0	1	0	60	4	0	4.00	.826	—	—	—	—	—	—	—	—
2016–17	HC Dinamo Minsk	KHL	55	28	18	8	3,232	123	8	2.28	.918	5	1	4	270	16	0	3.55	.896
2017–18	Salavat Yulaev Ufa	KHL	35	19	11	2	1,941	74	4	2.29	.917	11	6	5	645	23	1	2.14	.922
NHL totals			144	47	64	17	7957	387	7	2.92	.905	—	—	—	—	—	—	—	—

=== International ===
Year	Team	Event	Result	GP	W	L	T/OT	MIN	GA	SO	GAA	SV%
2014	Canada	WC	5th	4	3	1	0	241	7	0	1.74	.938
2018	Canada	OG	3rd place, bronze medalist(s)	3	1	1	0	149	4	0	1.61	.929
Senior totals				7	4	2	0	390	11	0	1.65	.934

== Awards and honours ==
Award	Year	Ref
Junior
Spruce Grove Saints most valuable player	2006	
Spruce Grove Saints Player of the Year	2006	
Alberta Junior Hockey League All-Star	2006	
College
All-ECAC Hockey Second Team	2008–09	
All-ECAC Hockey First Team	2009–10	
AHCA East First-Team All-American	2009–10	
ECAC HockeyAll-Tournament Team	2010	
AHL
Harry "Hap" Holmes Memorial Award	2011–12	

Awards and achievements
Preceded by Sean Backman	ECAC Hockey Most Outstanding Player in Tournament; 2010	Succeeded by Ryan Rondeau
