= 2008–09 NCAA Division I men's ice hockey season =

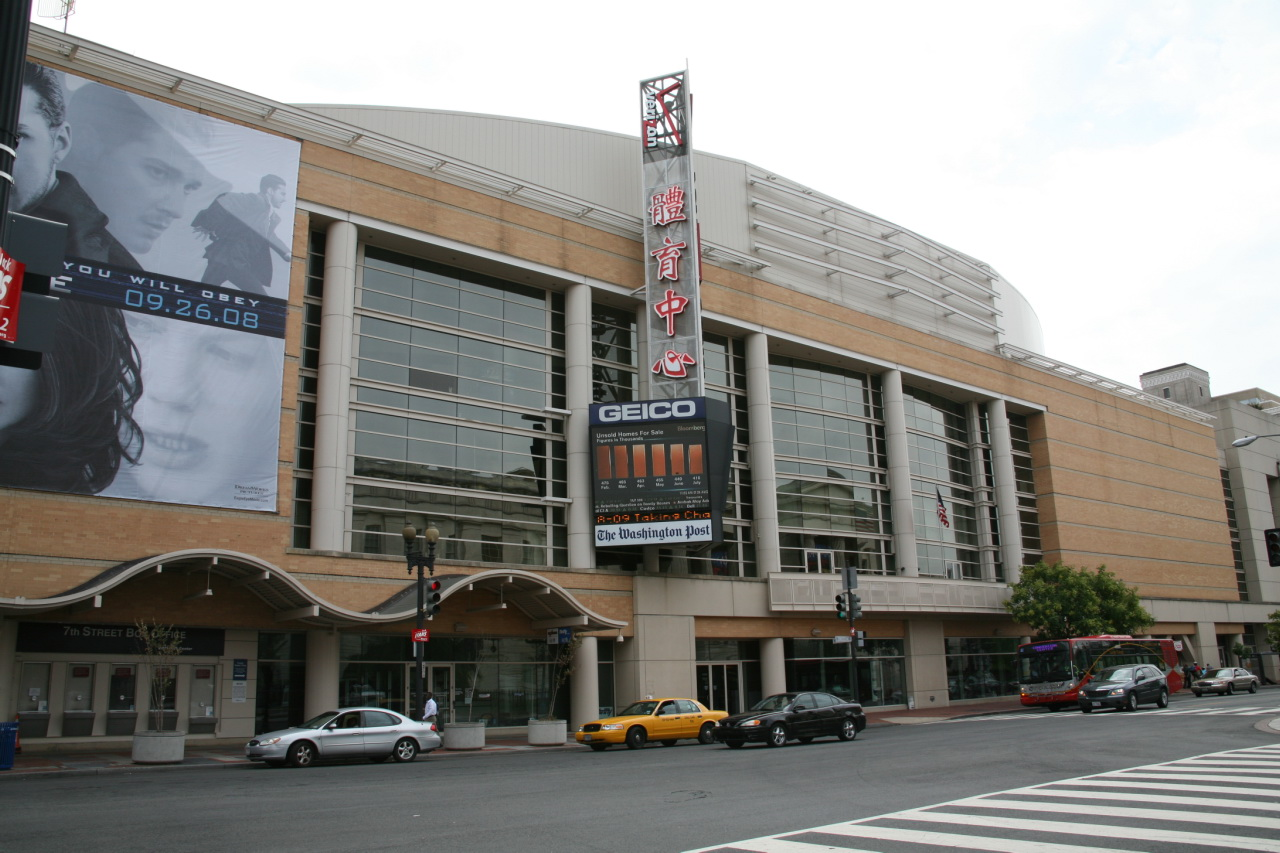
- The Verizon Center in Washington, D.C. hosted the 2009 Frozen Four
- Duration: October 10, 2008– April 11, 2009
- NCAA tournament: 2009
- National championship: Verizon Center; Washington, D.C.
- NCAA champion: Boston University
- Hobey Baker Award: Matt Gilroy (Boston University)

The 2008–09 NCAA Division I men's ice hockey season began on October 10, 2008 and concluded with the 2009 NCAA Division I men's ice hockey tournament's championship game on April 11, 2009 at the Verizon Center in Washington, D.C. Over the course of the season, five teams achieved the nation's #1 ranking, with Boston University finishing the season as the top-ranked team after winning the national championship tournament. This was the 62nd season in which an NCAA ice hockey championship was held and is the 115th year overall where an NCAA school fielded a team.

== Season Outlook ==
=== Pre-season polls ===
The top teams in the nation as ranked before the start of the season.

The U.S. College Hockey Online/CBS College Sports Network poll was voted on by coaches, media, and NHL scouts. The USA Today/USA Hockey Magazine poll was voted on by coaches and media.

College Sports Television was acquired by CBS in 2008 and rebranded CBS College Sports Network. The network stopped sponsoring the USCHO poll after the end of the season.

USCHO Poll
Rank	Team
1	Boston College (36)
2	Michigan (5)
3	Colorado College (7)
4	Notre Dame (1)
5	North Dakota (1)
6	Denver
7	New Hampshire
8	Miami
9	Boston University
10	Minnesota
11	Michigan State
12	Princeton
13	Clarkson
14	Wisconsin
15	St. Cloud State
16	Northern Michigan
17	Cornell
18	Minnesota State
19	Harvard
20	Vermont

USA Today Poll
Rank	Team
1	Boston College (27)
2	Michigan (4)
3	Notre Dame
4	North Dakota (1)
5	Colorado College (2)
6	Denver
7	New Hampshire
8	Miami
9	Minnesota
10	Boston University
11	Clarkson
12	Michigan State
13	Wisconsin
14	Northern Michigan
15	St. Cloud State

== Regular season ==
=== Season format ===
Beginning in 2008–09, a shootout is used to determine CCHA conference games that end in a tie. Shootout losers receive one point and an addition to their total number of ties. Shootout winners receive one point and an addition to their total number of ties, and as a bonus, receive one bonus point and an addition to their total number of shootout wins.

=== Season tournaments ===
Tournament	Dates	Teams	Champion
Ice Breaker Tournament	October 10–11	4	Boston University
Superior Cup	October 10–11	4	Minnesota-Duluth
Kendall Hockey Classic	October 10–11	4	Alaska
Mutual of Omaha Stampede	October 17–18	4	Nebraska-Omaha
Brice Alaska Goal Rush	October 17–18	4	Alaska-Anchorage
Governor's Cup	October 24–25	4	Union
Showcase at Brown	October 31–November 1	4	
Rensselaer Holiday Tournament	November 28–29	4	Mercyhurst
College Hockey Showcase	November 28–29	4	
Badger Showdown	December 27–28	4	Wisconsin
Florida College Classic	December 27–28	4	Cornell
Great Lakes Invitational	December 27–28	4	Michigan
Ledyard Bank Classic	December 28–29	4	Dartmouth
UConn Hockey Classic	December 29–30	4	Quinnipiac
Dodge Holiday Classic	January 2–3	4	Minnesota
Denver Cup	January 2–3	4	Boston University
Ohio Hockey Classic	January 2–3	4	Ohio State
Catamount Cup	January 2–3	4	Vermont
Shillelagh Tournament	January 2–3	4	Notre Dame
Beanpot	February 2–9	4	Boston University

=== Standings ===
2008–09 Atlantic Hockey standings
	Conference							Overall					
	GP	W	L	T	PTS	GF	GA	GP	W	L	T	GF	GA
#14 Air Force†*	28	20	6	2	42	105	61	41	28	11	2	148	86
RIT†	28	20	6	2	42	112	73	38	23	13	2	148	117
Mercyhurst	28	17	8	3	37	117	73	40	22	15	3	155	119
Bentley	28	15	11	2	32	91	76	38	19	17	2	116	116
Canisius	28	12	12	4	28	86	80	37	15	16	6	114	111
Army	28	10	12	6	26	77	91	36	11	19	6	92	125
Holy Cross	28	10	15	3	23	73	87	38	13	20	5	106	130
Sacred Heart	28	9	16	3	21	83	107	38	11	23	4	99	147
Connecticut	28	8	18	2	18	74	107	37	9	26	2	89	142
American International	28	5	22	1	11	53	116	35	5	28	2	58	141
Championship: Air Force † indicates conference regular season co-champion * indicates conference tournament champion Final rankings: USA Today/USA Hockey Magazine Top 15 Poll

2008–09 Central Collegiate Hockey Association standings
	Conference								Overall					
	GP	W	L	T	SW	PTS	GF	GA	GP	W	L	T	GF	GA
#4 Notre Dame†*	28	21	4	3	3	48	95	52	40	31	6	3	135	69
#5 Michigan	28	20	8	0	0	40	98	51	41	29	12	0	145	84
#2 Miami	28	17	7	4	2	40	89	57	41	23	13	5	128	89
Alaska	28	0^	28^	0^	0^	34	54	51	39	0^	39^	0^	74	68
Ohio State	28	13	11	4	3	33	87	85	42	23	15	4	143	119
Northern Michigan	28	11	12	5	3	30	72	73	41	19	17	5	111	103
Western Michigan	28	9	13	6	2	26	75	86	41	14	20	7	111	130
Nebraska–Omaha	28	8	13	7	3	26	62	76	40	15	17	8	98	103
Ferris State	28	9	14	5	2	25	58	68	38	12	19	7	90	105
Lake Superior State	28	7	15	6	1	21	73	86	39	11	20	8	110	115
Michigan State	28	7	17	4	3	21	43	85	38	10	23	5	62	118
Bowling Green	28	8	19	1	0	17	60	96	38	11	24	3	89	131
Championship: Notre Dame † indicates conference regular season champion * indicates conference tournament champion Final rankings: USA Today/USA Hockey Magazine Top 15 Poll^ Alaska was retroactively required to forfeit all wins and ties due to player ineligibilities.

2008–09 College Hockey America standings
	Conference							Overall					
	GP	W	L	T	PTS	GF	GA	GP	W	L	T	GF	GA
#9 Bemidji State†*	18	12	5	1	25	55	38	37	20	16	1	106	97
Niagara	18	9	5	4	22	53	44	36	16	14	6	98	92
Robert Morris	18	5	8	5	15	46	57	36	10	19	7	93	121
Alabama–Huntsville	18	3	11	4	10	43	58	30	5	20	5	63	99
Championship: Bemidji State † indicates conference regular season champion * indicates conference tournament champion Final rankings: USA Today/USA Hockey Magazine Top 15 Poll

2008–09 ECAC Hockey standings
	Conference							Overall					
	GP	W	L	T	PTS	GF	GA	GP	W	L	T	GF	GA
#10 Yale†*	22	15	5	2	32	74	48	34	24	8	2	113	76
#12 Cornell	22	13	6	3	29	56	41	36	22	10	4	92	74
#15 Princeton	22	14	8	0	28	53	40	35	22	12	1	99	74
St. Lawrence	22	11	7	4	26	71	48	38	21	12	5	124	92
Harvard	22	9	7	6	24	54	56	31	9	16	6	68	96
Dartmouth	22	11	9	2	24	63	60	31	14	14	3	88	87
Quinnipiac	22	9	10	3	21	62	46	39	18	18	3	124	110
Union	22	9	11	2	20	56	64	39	19	17	3	111	107
Clarkson	22	8	10	4	20	58	68	36	10	19	7	88	115
Colgate	22	6	11	5	17	45	58	37	12	18	7	89	109
Rensselaer	22	6	15	1	13	50	75	39	10	27	2	76	132
Brown	22	3	15	4	10	44	82	33	5	23	5	60	115
Championship: Yale † indicates conference regular season champion (Cleary Cup) * indicates conference tournament champion (Whitelaw Cup); Final rankings: USA Today/USA Hockey Magazine Top 15 Poll

2008–09 Hockey East standings
	Conference							Overall					
	GP	W	L	T	PTS	GF	GA	GP	W	L	T	GF	GA
#1 Boston University†*	27	18	5	4	40	103	54	45	35	6	4	177	91
#11 Northeastern	27	18	6	3	39	78	59	41	25	12	4	121	91
#6 New Hampshire	27	15	8	4	32	80	78	38	20	13	5	116	112
#3 Vermont	27	15	8	4	32	78	69	39	22	12	5	121	102
Massachusetts–Lowell	27	14	11	2	30	84	66	38	20	16	2	112	86
Boston College	27	11	11	5	27	81	77	37	18	14	5	112	105
Massachusetts	27	10	14	3	23	77	75	39	16	20	3	112	103
Maine	27	7	17	3	17	52	82	39	13	22	4	86	110
Merrimack	27	5	19	3	13	57	80	34	9	21	4	72	89
Providence	27	4	18	5	13	56	106	34	7	22	5	77	133
Championship: Boston University † indicates conference regular season champion * indicates conference tournament champion Final rankings: USA Today/USA Hockey Magazine Top 15 Poll

2008–09 Western Collegiate Hockey Association standings
	Conference							Overall					
	GP	W	L	T	PTS	GF	GA	GP	W	L	T	GF	GA
#13 North Dakota†	28	17	7	4	38	96	74	43	24	15	4	146	118
#7 Denver	28	16	8	4	36	96	68	40	23	12	5	132	96
Wisconsin	28	14	11	3	31	92	78	40	20	16	4	131	106
Colorado College	28	12	9	7	31	79	82	38	16	12	10	103	103
Minnesota	28	12	11	5	29	87	83	37	17	13	7	119	105
St. Cloud State	28	13	13	2	28	83	81	38	18	17	3	122	107
#8 Minnesota–Duluth*	28	10	11	7	27	78	72	43	22	13	8	128	98
Minnesota State	28	11	13	4	26	88	90	38	15	17	6	117	122
Alaska–Anchorage	28	9	14	5	23	69	93	36	14	17	5	95	111
Michigan Tech	28	2	19	7	11	47	94	38	6	25	7	62	122
Championship: Minnesota–Duluth † indicates conference regular season champion * indicates conference tournament champion Final rankings: USA Today/USA Hockey Magazine Top 15 Poll

== 2009 NCAA tournament ==
Regional semifinals
1	Michigan	0
4	Air Force	2
East Regional
2	Yale	1
3	Vermont	4
1	Boston University	8
4	Ohio State	3
Northeast Regional
2	New Hampshire	6*
3	North Dakota	5
1	Denver	2
4	Miami	4
West Regional
2	Minnesota–Duluth	5*
3	Princeton	4
1	Notre Dame	1
4	Bemidji State	5
Midwest Regional
2	Northeastern	2
3	Cornell	3

Regional Finals
4	Air Force	2
3	Vermont	3**
1	Boston University	2
3	New Hampshire	1
4	Miami	2
2	Minnesota–Duluth	1
4	Bemidji State	4
3	Cornell	1

Frozen Four
E3	Vermont	4
NE1	Boston University	5
W4	Miami	4
MW4	Bemidji State	1

National championship
NE1	Boston University	4*
W4	Miami	3

Note: * denotes overtime period(s)

== Player stats ==
=== Scoring leaders ===
The following players led the league in points at the conclusion of the season.

GP = Games played; G = Goals; A = Assists; Pts = Points; PIM = Penalty minutes

Player	Class	Team	GP	G	A	Pts	PIM
Bryan Leitch	Senior	Quinnipiac	39	12	47	59	20
Colin Wilson	Sophomore	Boston University	43	17	38	55	42
Jacques Lamoureux	Junior	Air Force	41	33	20	53	28
MacGregor Sharp	Senior	Minnesota–Duluth	43	26	24	50	50
Steve Cameron	Sophomore	Mercyhurst	40	22	28	50	10
Nick Bonino	Sophomore	Boston University	44	18	32	50	42
Aaron Palushaj	Sophomore	Michigan	39	13	37	50	24
Louie Caporusso	Sophomore	Michigan	41	24	25	49	28
Garrett Roe	Sophomore	St. Cloud State	38	17	31	48	66
Justin Fontaine	Sophomore	Minnesota–Duluth	43	15	33	48	44
Chris Higgins	Senior	Boston University	42	14	34	48	50

=== Leading goaltenders ===
The following goaltenders led the league in goals against average at the end of the regular season while playing at least 33% of their team's total minutes.

GP = Games played; Min = Minutes played; W = Wins; L = Losses; OT = Overtime/shootout losses; GA = Goals against; SO = Shutouts; SV% = Save percentage; GAA = Goals against average

Player	Class	Team	GP	Min	W	L	OT	GA	SO	SV%	GAA
Chad Johnson	Senior	Alaska	35	2,062:29	14	16	5	57	6	.940	1.66
Jordan Pearce	Senior	Notre Dame	39	2,326:20	30	6	3	65	8	.931	1.68
Ben Scrivens	Junior	Cornell	36	2,152:50	22	10	4	65	7	.931	1.81
Zane Kalemba	Junior	Princeton	34	2,041:37	22	10	1	62	2	.932	1.82
Kieran Millan	Freshman	Boston University	35	2,072:48	29	2	3	67	3	.921	1.94
Andrew Volkening	Junior	Air Force	41	2,502:37	28	11	2	82	6	.920	1.97
Bryan Hogan	Sophomore	Michigan	31	1,792:43	24	6	0	59	3	.914	1.97
Alec Richards	Senior	Yale	25	1,458:13	19	5	1	50	4	.923	2.06
Carter Hutton	Junior	Massachusetts–Lowell	19	1,106:15	9	8	1	38	3	.916	2.06
Connor Knapp	Freshman	Miami	23	1,349:53	13	5	3	47	2	.904	2.09

== Awards ==
=== NCAA ===
Award		Recipient
Hobey Baker Award		Matt Gilroy, Boston University
Spencer T. Penrose Award		Jack Parker, Boston University
National Rookie of the Year		Kieran Millan, Boston University
Derek Hines Unsung Hero Award		Mike Phillipich, Air Force
Lowe's Senior CLASS Award		Jeff Lerg, Michigan State
Tournament Most Outstanding Player		Colby Cohen, Boston University
AHCA All-American Teams
East First Team	Position	West First Team
Brad Thiessen, Northeastern	G	Alex Stalock, Minnesota–Duluth
Matt Gilroy, Boston University	D	Ian Cole, Notre Dame
Zach Miskovic, St. Lawrence	D	Jamie McBain, Wisconsin
David McIntyre, Colgate	F	Louie Caporusso, Michigan
Viktor Stalberg, Vermont	F	Aaron Palushaj, Michigan
Colin Wilson, Boston University	F	Ryan Stoa, Minnesota
East Second Team	Position	West Second Team
Zane Kalemba, Princeton	G	Chad Johnson, Alaska
Maury Edwards, Massachusetts–Lowell	D	Chay Genoway, North Dakota
Kevin Shattenkirk, Boston University	D	Erik Gustafsson, Northern Michigan
Mark Arcobello, Yale	F	Carter Camper, Miami
Jacques Lamoureux, Air Force	F	Erik Condra, Notre Dame
James Marcou, Massachusetts	F	Chad Rau, Colorado College

=== Atlantic Hockey ===
Award		Recipient
Player of the Year		Jacques Lamoureux, Air Force
Best Defensive Forward		Anthony Canzoneri, Bentley
Best Defenseman		Greg Flynn, Air Force
Rookie of the Year		David Kostuch, Canisius
Regular Season Goaltending Award		Andrew Volkening, Air Force
Coach of the Year		Ryan Soderquist, Bentley
Most Valuable Player in Tournament		Matt Fairchild, Air Force
Individual Sportsmanship		Anthony Canzoneri, Bentley
Regular Season Scoring Trophy		Jacques Lamoureux, Air Force
All-Atlantic Hockey Teams
First Team	Position	Second Team
Andrew Volkening, Air Force	G	Ryan Zapolski, Mercyhurst
Greg Flynn, Air Force	D	Bobby Raymond, RIT
Zach McKelvie, Army	D	Sean Erickson, Connecticut
Dan Ringwald, RIT	D	
Jacques Lamoureux, Air Force	F	Dain Prewitt, Bentley
Owen Meyer, Army	F	Steve Cameron, Mercyhurst
Brennan Sarazin, RIT	F	Matt Pierce, Mercyhurst
Third Team	Position	Rookie Team
Kyle Rank, Bentley	G	Kyle Rank, Bentley
Al Mazur, RIT	D	Marcel Alvarez, Army
Carl Hudson, Canisius	D	Scott Mathis, Air Force
Matt Fairchild, Bentley	F	David Kostuch, Canisius
Jason Weeks, Canisius	F	Phil Ginand, Mercyhurst
Scott Pitt, Mercyhurst	F	Tyler Brenner, RIT

=== CCHA ===
Awards		Recipient
Player of the Year		Chad Johnson, Alaska
Best Defensive Forward		Tim Miller, Michigan
Best Defensive Defenseman		Kyle Lawson, Notre Dame
Best Offensive Defenseman		Erik Gustafsson, Northern Michigan
Rookie of the Year		David Wohlberg, Michigan
Best Goaltender		Chad Johnson, Alaska
Coach of the Year		Dallas Ferguson, Alaska
Terry Flanagan Memorial Award		Erik Condra, Notre Dame
Ilitch Humanitarian Award		Jeff Lerg, Michigan State
		Jerad Kaufmann, Nebraska-Omaha
Perani Cup Champion		Chad Johnson, Alaska
Scholar-Athlete of the Year		Jordan Pearce, Notre Dame
Most Valuable Player in Tournament		Jordan Pearce, Notre Dame
All-CCHA Teams
First Team	Position	Second Team
Chad Johnson, Alaska	G	Jeff Lerg, Michigan State
Erik Gustafsson, Northern Michigan	D	Kyle Lawson, Notre Dame
Ian Cole, Notre Dame	D	Eddie DelGrosso, Nebraska-Omaha
Carter Camper, Miami	F	Erik Condra, Notre Dame
Aaron Palushaj, Michigan	F	Christian Hanson, Notre Dame
Louie Caporusso, Michigan	F	Patrick Galivan, Western Michigan
Rookie Team	Position	
Connor Knapp, Miami	G	
Chris Wideman, Miami	D	
Matt Bartkowski, Ohio State	D	
Brandon Burlon, Michigan	D	
Zac Dalpe, Ohio State	F	
Billy Maday, Notre Dame	F	
David Wohlberg, Michigan	F	

=== CHA ===
Award		Recipient
Player of the Year		Juliano Pagliero, Niagara
Rookie of the Year		Brad Hunt, Bemidji State
Coach of the Year		Tom Serratore, Bemidji State
Student-Athlete of the Year		Vince Rocco, Niagara
Most Valuable Player in Tournament		Matt Read, Bemidji State
All-CHA Teams
First Team	Position	Second Team
Juliano Pagliero, Niagara	G	Matt Dalton, Bemidji State
Denny Urban, Robert Morris	D	Tyler Gotto, Niagara
Brad Hunt, Bemidji State	D	Cody Bostock, Bemidji State
Matt Read, Bemidji State	F	Tyler Scofield, Bemidji State
Chris Margott, Robert Morris	F	Vince Rocco, Niagara
Nathan Longpre, Robert Morris	F	Egor Mironov, Niagara
Rookie Team	Position	
Brooks Ostergard, Robert Morris	G	
James Lyle, Robert Morris	D	
Brad Hunt, Bemidji State	D	
Dan Baco, Niagara	F	
Cody Campbell, Alabama-Huntsville	F	
Ben Kinne, Bemidji State	F	

=== ECAC ===
Award		Recipient
Player of the Year		Zane Kalemba, Princeton
Rookie of the Year		Jody O'Neill, Dartmouth
Tim Taylor Award		Keith Allain, Yale
Best Defensive Forward		Tyler Mugford, Cornell
Best Defensive Defenseman		Matt Generous, St. Lawrence
Ken Dryden Award		Zane Kalemba, Princeton
Student-Athlete of the Year		Matt Cook, Union
Most Outstanding Player in Tournament		Sean Backman, Yale
All-ECAC Hockey Teams
First Team	Position	Second Team
Zane Kalemba, Princeton	G	Ben Scrivens, Cornell
Lane Caffaro, Union	D	Tom Dignard, Yale
Zach Miskovic, St. Lawrence	D	Brendon Nash, Cornell
Mark Arcobello, Yale	F	Bryan Leitch, Quinnipiac
Riley Nash, Cornell	F	Colin Greening, Cornell
David McIntyre, Colgate	F	Brett Wilson, Princeton
Third Team	Position	Rookie Team
Alec Richards, Yale	G	Jody O'Neill, Dartmouth
Alex Biega, Harvard	D	Jeff Buvinow, Brown
Jody Peterson, Princeton	D	Keir Ross, Cornell
Brock McBride, St. Lawrence	F	Patrick Cullen, Rensselaer
Broc Little, Yale	F	Doug Jones, Dartmouth
Adam Presizniuk, Union	F	Brian O'Neill, Yale

=== Hockey East ===
Award		Recipient
Player of the Year		Brad Thiessen, Northeastern
Rookie of the Year		Kieran Millan, Boston University
Bob Kullen Coach of the Year Award		Greg Cronin, Northeastern
Len Ceglarski Award		Dean Strong, Vermont
Best Defensive Forward		Joe Vitale, Northeastern
Best Defensive Defenseman		Louis Liotti, Northeastern
Three-Stars Award		Brad Thiessen, Northeastern
William Flynn Tournament Most Valuable Player		Kieran Millan, Boston University
All-Hockey East Teams
First Team	Position	Second Team
Brad Thiessen, Northeastern	G	Kieran Millan, Boston University
Matt Gilroy, Boston University	D	Justin Braun, Massachusetts
Maury Edwards, Massachusetts-Lowell	D	Kevin Shattenkirk, Boston University
Colin Wilson, Boston University	F	Brock Bradford, Boston College
Viktor Stålberg, Vermont	F	Ryan Ginand, Northeastern
James Marcou, Massachusetts	F	James van Riemsdyk, New Hampshire
Rookie Team	Position	
Kieran Millan, Boston University	G	
Karl Stollery, Merrimack	D	
Chris Connolly, Boston University	D	
Gustav Nyquist, Maine	F	
Steve Quailer, Northeastern	F	
Casey Wellman, Massachusetts	F	
David Vallorani, Massachusetts-Lowell	F	

=== WCHA ===
Award		Recipient
Player of the Year		Jamie McBain, Wisconsin
Defensive Player of the Year		Chay Genoway, North Dakota
Rookie of the Year		Jordan Schroeder, Minnesota
Student-Athlete of the Year		J. P. Testwuide, Denver
Coach of the Year		Dave Hakstol, North Dakota
Most Valuable Player in Tournament		Alex Stalock, Minnesota-Duluth
All-WCHA Teams
First Team	Position	Second Team
Alex Stalock, Minnesota-Duluth	G	Marc Cheverie, Denver
Jamie McBain, Wisconsin	D	Patrick Wiercioch, Denver
Chay Genoway, North Dakota	D	Garrett Raboin, St. Cloud State
Ryan Stoa, Minnesota	F	Ryan Duncan, North Dakota
Chad Rau, Colorado College	F	Jordan Schroeder, Minnesota
Ryan Lasch, St. Cloud State	F	Justin Fontaine, Minnesota-Duluth
Third Team	Position	Rookie Team
Brad Eidsness, North Dakota	G	Brad Eidsness, North Dakota
Josh Meyers, Minnesota-Duluth	D	Patrick Wiercioch, Denver
Kurt Davis, Minnesota State	D	Jake Gardiner, Wisconsin
Garrett Roe, St. Cloud State	F	Jordan Schroeder, Minnesota
Anthony Maiani, Denver	F	Joe Colborne, Denver
Rhett Rakhshani, Denver	F	Mike Connolly, Minnesota-Duluth

== 2009 NHL entry draft ==
Round	Pick	Player	College	Conference	NHL team
1	16	Nick Leddy ^{†}	Minnesota	WCHA	Minnesota Wild
1	18	Louis Leblanc ^{†}	Harvard	ECAC Hockey	Montreal Canadiens
1	19	Chris Kreider ^{†}	Boston College	Hockey East	New York Rangers
1	22	Jordan Schroeder	Minnesota	WCHA	Vancouver Canucks
1	26	Kyle Palmieri ^{†}	Notre Dame	CCHA	Anaheim Ducks
1	28	Dylan Olsen ^{†}	Minnesota–Duluth	WCHA	Chicago Blackhawks
2	36	Chris Brown ^{†}	Michigan	CCHA	Phoenix Coyotes
2	38	Alex Chiasson ^{†}	Boston University	Hockey East	Dallas Stars
2	41	Zach Budish ^{†}	Minnesota	WCHA	Nashville Predators
2	43	William Wrenn ^{†}	Denver	WCHA	San Jose Sharks
2	44	Drew Shore ^{†}	Denver	WCHA	Florida Panthers
2	50	Kenny Ryan ^{†}	Boston College	Hockey East	Toronto Maple Leafs
2	51	Brian Dumoulin ^{†}	Boston College	Hockey East	Carolina Hurricanes
2	56	Kevin Lynch ^{†}	Michigan	CCHA	Columbus Blue Jackets
2	59	Brandon Pirri ^{†}	Rensselaer	ECAC Hockey	Chicago Blackhawks
2	61	Philip Samuelsson ^{†}	Boston College	Hockey East	Pittsburgh Penguins
3	63	Ben Hanowski ^{†}	St. Cloud State	WCHA	Pittsburgh Penguins
3	67	Josh Birkholz ^{†}	Minnesota	WCHA	Florida Panthers
3	69	Reilly Smith ^{†}	Miami	CCHA	Dallas Stars
3	83	Kevin Connauton	Western Michigan	CCHA	Vancouver Canucks
3	89	Dan DeLisle ^{†}	Minnesota–Duluth	WCHA	Chicago Blackhawks
3	91	Mike Lee ^{†}	St. Cloud State	WCHA	Phoenix Coyotes
4	98	Craig Smith ^{†}	Wisconsin	WCHA	Nashville Predators
4	99	Kyle Bigos ^{†}	Merrimack	Hockey East	Edmonton Oilers
4	100	Chris Wideman	Miami	CCHA	Ottawa Senators
4	110	Nick Oliver ^{†}	St. Cloud State	WCHA	Nashville Predators
4	114	Seth Helgeson ^{†}	Minnesota	WCHA	New Jersey Devils
4	115	Patrick Wey ^{†}	Boston College	Hockey East	Washington Capitals
4	116	Alexander Fällström ^{†}	Harvard	ECAC Hockey	Minnesota Wild
5	123	Alex Velischek ^{†}	Providence	Hockey East	Pittsburgh Penguins
5	124	Kieran Millan	Boston University	Hockey East	Colorado Avalanche
5	128	Eric Knodel ^{†}	New Hampshire	Hockey East	Toronto Maple Leafs
5	134	Mark Adams ^{†}	Providence	Hockey East	Buffalo Sabres
5	135	Corban Knight ^{†}	North Dakota	WCHA	Florida Panthers
5	136	Radoslav Illo ^{†}	Bemidji State	CHA	Anaheim Ducks
5	137	Thomas Larkin ^{†}	Colgate	ECAC Hockey	Columbus Blue Jackets
5	138	Wade Megan ^{†}	Boston University	Hockey East	Florida Panthers
5	144	Derek Rodwell ^{†}	North Dakota	WCHA	New Jersey Devils
5	146	Jeff Costello ^{†}	Notre Dame	CCHA	Ottawa Senators
5	150	Nick Jensen ^{†}	St. Cloud State	WCHA	Detroit Red Wings
6	152	Anders Lee ^{†}	Notre Dame	CCHA	New York Islanders
6	158	Jerry D'Amigo ^{†}	Rensselaer	ECAC Hockey	Toronto Maple Leafs
6	159	Curtis McKenzie ^{†}	Miami	CCHA	Dallas Stars
6	164	Connor Knapp	Miami	CCHA	Buffalo Sabres
6	169	Dustin Walsh ^{†}	Dartmouth	ECAC Hockey	Montreal Canadiens
6	173	Joe Cannata	Merrimack	Hockey East	Vancouver Canucks
6	177	David Pacan ^{†}	Vermont	Hockey East	Chicago Blackhawks
7	182	Erik Haula ^{†}	Minnesota	WCHA	Minnesota Wild
7	183	Kirill Gotovets ^{†}	Cornell	ECAC Hockey	Tampa Bay Lightning
7	184	Gus Young ^{†}	Yale	ECAC Hockey	Colorado Avalanche
7	190	Brad Peltz ^{†}	Yale	ECAC Hockey	Ottawa Senators
7	191	Michael Sdao ^{†}	Princeton	ECAC Hockey	Ottawa Senators
7	192	Cam Reid ^{†}	St. Cloud State	WCHA	Nashville Predators
7	195	Paul Phillips ^{†}	Denver	WCHA	Chicago Blackhawks
7	196	Oliver Lauridsen	St. Cloud State	WCHA	Philadelphia Flyers
7	198	Nic Dowd ^{†}	St. Cloud State	WCHA	Los Angeles Kings
7	199	Michael Cichy ^{†}	North Dakota	WCHA	Montreal Canadiens
7	202	Max Tardy ^{†}	Minnesota–Duluth	WCHA	St. Louis Blues
7	203	Jordan Samuels-Thomas ^{†}	Bowling Green	CCHA	Atlanta Thrashers
7	204	Curtis Gedig ^{†}	Ohio State	CCHA	New Jersey Devils
7	206	Ben Sexton ^{†}	Clarkson	ECAC Hockey	Boston Bruins

† incoming freshman

== See also ==
- 2008–09 NCAA Division III men's ice hockey season
