= 2006 ECAC Hockey men's ice hockey tournament =

2006 ECAC Men's ice hockey tournament
- Dates: March 3–18, 2006
- Teams: 12
- Finals site: Pepsi Arena; Albany, New York
- Champions: Harvard (7th title)
- Winning coach: Ted Donato (1st title)
- MVP: John Daigneau (Harvard)
- ECAC Men's Ice Hockey Tournaments

The 2006 ECAC Hockey Men's Ice Hockey Tournament was the 45th tournament in conference history. It was played between March 3 and March 18, 2006. Opening round and quarterfinal games were played at home team campus sites, while the final four games were played at the Pepsi Arena (subsequently renamed Times Union Center) in Albany, New York. By winning the tournament, Harvard received the ECAC's automatic bid to the 2006 NCAA Division I Men's Ice Hockey Tournament.

== Conference standings ==
Note: GP = Games played; W = Wins; L = Losses; T = Ties; PTS = Points; GF = Goals For; GA = Goals Against

2005–06 ECAC Hockey standings
	Conference							Overall					
	GP	W	L	T	PTS	GF	GA	GP	W	L	T	GF	GA
Dartmouth†	22	14	6	2	30	84	56	33	19	12	2	113	92
Colgate†	22	14	6	2	30	66	46	39	20	13	6	113	93
#7 Cornell	22	13	6	3	29	61	48	35	22	9	4	99	77
#10 Harvard*	22	13	8	1	27	63	59	35	21	12	2	111	92
St. Lawrence	22	12	9	1	25	74	66	40	21	17	2	130	121
Rensselaer	22	8	8	6	22	53	56	37	14	17	6	105	111
Union	22	9	9	4	22	48	53	38	16	16	6	90	103
Clarkson	22	9	11	2	20	61	70	38	18	17	3	121	111
Princeton	22	7	12	3	17	62	69	31	10	18	3	81	96
Quinnipiac	22	8	13	1	17	70	74	39	20	18	1	130	110
Yale	22	6	14	2	14	65	83	33	10	20	3	89	123
Brown	22	3	14	5	11	45	72	32	5	20	7	69	106
Championship: Harvard † indicates conference regular season champion (Cleary Cup) * indicates conference tournament champion (Whitelaw Cup); Final rankings: USA Today/USA Hockey Magazine Top 15 Poll

== Bracket ==
Teams are reseeded after the First Round and Quarterfinals

First round March 3–5
5	St. Lawrence	3*	2	5*
12	Brown	2	3	4
6	Union	1	2	—
11	Yale	2*	3*****	—
7	Rensselaer	1	2	—
10	Quinnipiac	2	4	—
8	Clarkson	2	5	—
9	Princeton	1	0	—

Quarterfinals; March 10–12
1	Dartmouth	5	3	—
11	Yale	1	1	—
2	Colgate	0	5	4
10	Quinnipiac	3	3	0
3	Cornell	4**	3**	—
8	Clarkson	3	2	—
4	Harvard	1	3	8
5	St. Lawrence	5	2	4

Semifinals; March 17
1	Dartmouth	1
4	Harvard	10
2	Colgate	0
3	Cornell	2

Championship; March 18
4	Harvard	6
3	Cornell	2
Third place
1	Dartmouth	3
2	Colgate	2

Note: * denotes overtime period(s)

=== First round ===
==== (5) St. Lawrence vs. (12) Brown ====
March 3	St. Lawrence	3 – 2	OT	Brown	Appleton Arena	Recap
No scoring		First period		18:59 – PP – Brian McNary (Hurley, Slais)
(Sandrzyk, Bagnall) Kevin DeVergilio – 15:30		Second period		13:34 – Sean Dersch (Crosty)
(Miskovic, Fensel) Jared Ross – PP – 00:56		Third period		No scoring
(Trevelyan, Madill) Mike Zbriger – GW – 00:25		First overtime period		No scoring
( 25 saves / 27 shots ) Justin Pesony		Goalie stats		Adam D'Alba ( 51 saves / 54 shots )

March 4	St. Lawrence	2 – 3	Brown	Appleton Arena	Recap
No scoring		First period	03:35 – Seth Seidman (Dersch); 05:08 – Sean Dersch (Poli, McNary)
(Rank) Jared Ross – PP – 02:10 (Hogg, Miskovic) Jared Ross – 18:59		Second period	No scoring
No scoring		Third period	04:34 – GW PP – Jeff Prough (Poli, McNary)
( 10 saves / 13 shots ) Justin Pesony		Goalie stats	Adam D'Alba ( 54 saves / 56 shots )

March 5	St. Lawrence	5 – 4	OT	Brown	Appleton Arena	Recap
(Parker, Bagnall) Simon Watson – 14:51		First period		No scoring
No scoring		Second period		No scoring
(DeVergilio, Miskovic) Andrzej Sandrzyk – 07:51 (Trull, Zbriger) T.J. Trevelyan – 11:03 (Trevelyan, Trull) Mike Zbriger – PP – 12:35		Third period		02:54 – Brian McNary (Poli, LeCain); 08:47 – Chris Poli (McNary, Crosty); 14:16 – PP – Eric Slais (McNary); 19:56 – EA – Jeff Prough (Hurley, Dersch)
(DeVBergilio, Sandrzyk) Brock McBride – GW – 04:28		First overtime period		No scoring
( 29 saves / 33 shots ) Justin Pesony		Goalie stats		Adam D'Alba ( 48 saves / 53 shots )

St. Lawrence won series 2–1

==== (6) Union vs. (11) Yale ====
March 3	Union	1 – 2	OT	Yale	Achilles Center	Recap
No scoring		First period		14:30 – PP – David Meckler (Karwoski, Zappala)
(Streich, Mayotte) Torren Delforte – PP – 09:46		Second period		No scoring
No scoring		Third period		No scoring
No scoring		First overtime period		09:21 – GW – Matt Cohen (Burns, Germain)
( 29 saves / 31 shots ) Kris Mayotte		Goalie stats		Alec Richards ( 40 saves / 41 shots )

March 4	Union	2 – 3	5OT	Yale	Achilles Center	Recap
(Bouchard) Bryan Campbell – PP – 09:55		First period		No scoring
No scoring		Second period		04:54 – Nate Jackson (Germain)
(Streich, Delforte) Jason Visser – PP – 11:59		Third period		04:37 – Matt Cohen (Zappala)
No scoring		Fifth overtime period		01:35 – GW SH – David Meckler (Mayer)
( 58 saves / 61 shots ) Kris Mayotte		Goalie stats		Alec Richards ( 57 saves / 59 shots )

Yale won series 2–0

==== (7) Rensselaer vs. (10) Quinnipiac ====
March 3	Rensselaer	1 – 2	Quinnipiac	Houston Field House	Recap
No scoring		First period	03:09 – Jamie Bates (Nelson); 04:24 – GW PP – David Marshall (Cashman, Agnew)
No scoring		Second period	No scoring
(Colling, Croxton) Oren Eizenman – 02:58		Third period	No scoring
( 21 saves / 23 shots ) Mathias Lange		Goalie stats	Bud Fisher ( 28 saves / 29 shots )

March 4	Rensselaer	2 – 4	Quinnipiac	Houston Field House	Recap
(Colling, Croxton) Oren Eizenman – PP – 00:41		First period	04:50 – PP – Ben Nelson (Bates, Leitch); 13:55 – 5x3 – Reid Cashman (Sorteberg, Beitch); 18:05 – GW – Jamie Bates (Leitch)
(Kipp) Kevin Broad – 15:23		Second period	16:51 – John Kelly (unassisted)
No scoring		Third period	No scoring
( 14 saves / 18 shots ) Mathias Lange		Goalie stats	Bud Fisher ( 33 saves / 35 shots )

Quinnipiac won series 2–0

==== (8) Clarkson vs. (9) Princeton ====
March 3	Clarkson	2 – 1	Princeton	Cheel Arena	Recap
No scoring		First period	No scoring
(Dodge, Cayer) Mike Sullivan – 05:20		Second period	11:19 – PP – Kyle Hagel (Goeckner-Zoeller)
(Mason) Mike Sullivan – GW 4x4 – 06:27		Third period	No scoring
( 23 saves / 24 shots ) David Leggio		Goalie stats	Eric Leroux ( 17 saves / 19 shots )

March 4	Clarkson	5 – 0	Princeton	Cheel Arena	Recap
(Dodge, Grenzy) David Cayer – GW – 08:55		First period	No scoring
(Weller, Clitsome) Chris D'Alvise – PP – 07:35 (Cayer, Dodge) Mike Sullivan – 09:25 (Grenzy, Paquet) Chris D'Alvise – 4x4 – 16:19		Second period	No scoring
(Mason) Mike Willemsen – 06:27		Third period	No scoring
( 20 saves / 20 shots ) David Leggio		Goalie stats	Eric Leroux ( 32 saves / 37 shots )

Clarkson won series 2–0

=== Quarterfinals ===
==== (1) Dartmouth vs. (11) Yale ====
March 10	Dartmouth	5 – 1	Yale	Thompson Arena	Recap
(Lovejoy, Ouellette) Tanner Glass – 02:09 (Ouellette, Glass) Sean Offers – GW – 05:18		First period	No scoring
(Shields) John Gibson – 01:59 (Offers, Lewis) Tanner Glass – PP – 08:09 (Jones, Glass) Mike Ouellette – PP – 19:35		Second period	09:29 – David Meckler (Mayer, Jackson)
No scoring		Third period	No scoring
( 35 saves / 36 shots ) Mike Devine		Goalie stats	Alec Richards ( 20 saves / 25 shots ) Josh Gartner ( 5 saves / 5 shots )

March 11	Dartmouth	3 – 1	Yale	Thompson Arena	Recap
(Offers) Mike Ouellette – 5x3 – 13:25 (Lovejoy, Swallow) Ryan Bellows – GW – 17:13		First period	09:39 – Brad Mills (Hristovski, LeClerc)
No scoring		Second period	No scoring
(Przepiorka) Sean Offers – 03:20		Third period	No scoring
( 20 saves / 21 shots ) Mike Devine		Goalie stats	Alec Richards ( 44 saves / 47 shots )

Dartmouth won series 2–0

==== (2) Colgate vs. (10) Quinnipiac ====
March 10	Colgate	0 – 3	Quinnipiac	Starr Rink	Recap
No scoring		First period	19:54 – GW – Joe Dumais (Bordieri)
No scoring		Second period	No scoring
No scoring		Third period	05:05 – Chris Myers (Marshall, Meyer); 12:07 – Ben Nelson (Leitch)
( 20 saves / 23 shots ) Mark Dekanich		Goalie stats	Bud Fisher ( 28 saves / 28 shots )

March 11	Colgate	5 – 3	Quinnipiac	Starr Rink	Recap
(Camper, Tataryn) Peter Bogdanich – 05:30 (Campaner, Anderson) Tyler Burton – 4x4 – 11:53 (Smyth, Burton) Mark Anderson – PP – 14:54		First period	05:10 – PP – Bryan Leitch (Cashman, Sorteberg); 09:16 – PP – Jamie Bates (Nelson, Cashman)
(Smyth, Wilson) Marc Fulton – GW – 08:02		Second period	03:07 – PP – Reid Cashman (unassisted)
(Burton, Smyth) Jesse Winchester – 08:46		Third period	No scoring
( 30 saves / 33 shots ) Mark Dekanich		Goalie stats	Bud Fisher ( 24 saves / 29 shots )

March 12	Colgate	4 – 0	Quinnipiac	Starr Rink	Recap
(Winchester, Burton) Jon Smyth – GW – 19:33		First period	No scoring
(Smyth, Winchester) Tyler Burton – 03:07		Second period	No scoring
(Camper, Tataryn) Peter Bogdanich – 08:28 (Anderson, Campaner) Kyle Wilson – 4x4 – 16:37		Third period	No scoring
( 30 saves / 30 shots ) Mark Dekanich		Goalie stats	Bud Fisher ( 22 saves / 26 shots )

Colgate won series 2–1

==== (3) Cornell vs. (8) Clarkson ====
March 10	Cornell	4 – 3	2OT	Clarkson	Lynah Rink	Recap
(Kennedy, McCutcheon) Evan Barlow – 09:26		First period		No scoring
(Pegoraro, Abbott) Mark McCutcheon – 01:30 (unassisted) Dan Glover – 07:10		Second period		01:00 – Shea Guthrie (Weller Zalewski)
No scoring		Third period		10:34 – 4x4 – Nick Dodge (unassisted); 15:59 – Steve Zalewski (Weller, Mason)
(Abbott) Raymond Sawada – GW – 08:30		Second overtime period		No scoring
( 27 saves / 30 shots ) David McKee		Goalie stats		David Leggio ( 50 saves / 54 shots )

March 11	Cornell	3 – 2	2OT	Clarkson	Lynah Rink	Recap
(Scott, Moulson) Byron Bitz – PP – 02:54		First period		13:29 – Chris Brekelmans (unassisted)
(Pokulok, Abbott) Topher Scott – 15:40		Second period		07:17 – Max Kolu (McKinven)
No scoring		Third period		No scoring
(Bitz, Seminoff) Matt Moulson – GW 4x4 – 10:32		Second overtime period		No scoring
( 23 saves / 25 shots ) David McKee		Goalie stats		David Leggio ( 56 saves / 59 shots )

Cornell won series 2–0

==== (4) Harvard vs. (5) St. Lawrence ====
March 10	Harvard	1 – 5	St. Lawrence	Bright Hockey Center	Recap
No scoring		First period	04:31 – PP – Kevin DeVergilio (Miskovic, Rank); 14:37 – GW – Charlie Griffin (Wallmann, Rank)
No scoring		Second period	No scoring
(Murphy) Ryan Maki – 10:37		Third period	02:34 – Kevin DeVergilio (McBride); 13:28 – Kyle Rank (unassisted); 17:48 – 4x4 EN – Drew Bagnall (Madill, Rank)
( 26 saves / 30 shots ) John Daigneau ( 2 saves / 2 shots ) Justin Tobe		Goalie stats	Justin Pesony ( 31 saves / 32 shots )

March 11	Harvard	3 – 2	St. Lawrence	Bright Hockey Center	Recap
(Watters, Dufault) Tom Walsh – PP – 11:00		First period	No scoring
No scoring		Second period	00:51 – PP – Chase Trull (Madill, Trevelyan); 13:06 – Mike Madill (Sandrzyk, McBride)
(Du) Ryan Maki – 00:59 (Reese, Dufault) Dave Watters – GW – 17:34		Third period	No scoring
( 29 saves / 31 shots ) John Daigneau		Goalie stats	Justin Pesony ( 25 saves / 28 shots )

March 12	Harvard	8 – 4	St. Lawrence	Bright Hockey Center	Recap
(Pelle, Dufault) Dave Watters – 00:25 (McCafferty) Dan Murphy – 04:38 (Mandes) Tyler Magura – SH – 11:10		First period	18:10 – Jamie Parker (Fensel)
(Christian) Alex Meintel – 09:00 (McCafferty, Dufault) Steve Mandes – GW 4x4 – 10:33 (Coskren, MacDonald) Dan Murphy – 18:16		Second period	09:45 – Mike Zbriger (Rank, Ross)
(Du, Pelle) Dan Murphy – PP – 00:46 (Walsh, Johnson) Dave Watters – PP – 03:24		Third period	06:28 – PP – T.J. Trevelyan (Madill); 14:49 – PP – Simon Watson (Ross, Parker)
( 32 saves / 36 shots ) John Daigneau ( 1 save / 1 shot ) Mike Coskren		Goalie stats	Justin Pesony ( 27 saves / 34 shots ) Ryan Thorpe ( 0 saves / 0 shots ) John Hallas ( 4 saves / 5 shots )

Harvard won series 2–1

=== Semifinals ===
==== (1) Dartmouth vs. (4) Harvard ====
March 17	Dartmouth	1 – 10	Harvard	Pepsi Arena	Recap
No scoring		First period	09:01 – Tom Walsh (Dufault, Pelle); 13:35 – GW – Dylan Reese (Mandes)
No scoring		Second period	01:17 – Tyler Magura (McCafferty, Mandes); 04:17 – PP – Paul Dufault (Watters, Du); 05:16 – SH – Steve Mandes (unassisted); 19:52 – Kevin Du (McCafferty, Maki)
(Przepiorka, Sampson) Nick Johnson – 05:41		Third period	03:06 – PP – Joe Pelle (McCafferty, Reese); 05:58 – Paul Dufault (Pelle); 11:54 – 4x4 – Steve Mandes (unassisted); 18:17 – Ryan Maki (Murphy, Du)
( 17 saves / 23 shots ) Mike Devine ( 8 saves / 12 shots ) Dan Goulding		Goalie stats	John Daigneau ( 34 saves / 35 shots ) Justin Tobe ( 10 saves / 10 shots )

==== (2) Colgate vs. (3) Cornell ====
March 17	Colgate	0 – 2	Cornell	Pepsi Arena	Recap
No scoring		First period	No scoring
No scoring		Second period	06:49 – GW PP – Byron Bitz (Moulson, Scott)
No scoring		Third period	19:48 – EN SH – Daniel Pegoraro (O'Byrne, Gleed)
( 29 saves / 30 shots ) Mark Dekanich		Goalie stats	David McKee ( 20 saves / 20 shots )

=== Third place ===
==== (1) Dartmouth vs. (2) Colgate ====
March 18	Dartmouth	3 – 2	Colgate	Pepsi Arena	Recap
(Grecu) Rob Pritchard – 03:39 (Offers, Ouellette) Tanner Glass – PP – 10:08		First period	No scoring
(Ouellette, Offers) David Jones – GW 4x4 – 09:51		Second period	12:22 – Marc Fulton (St. Pierre, Smyth)
No scoring		Third period	15:40 – Marc Fulton (Smyth, Wilson)
( 21 saves / 23 shots ) Mike Devine		Goalie stats	Mark Dekanich ( 39 saves / 42 shots )

=== Championship ===
==== (3) Cornell vs. (4) Harvard ====
March 18	Cornell	2 – 6	Harvard	Pepsi Arena	Recap
No scoring		First period	04:30 – PP – Jimmy Fraser (McCafferty, Reese); 13:33 – 5x3 – Dylan Reese (Johnson, Maki); 19:36 – GW PP – Dan Murphy (Fraser, McCafferty)
(Carefoot) Michael Kennedy – 14:10 (Pokulok, Pegoraro) Ryan O'Byrne – 18:36		Second period	19:03 – PP – Jimmy Fraser (Murphy)
No scoring		Third period	06:09 – PP – Dan Murphy (Fraser, Reese); 10:12 – Kevin Du (Murphy, McCafferty)
( 19 saves / 25 shots ) David McKee ( 4 saves / 4 shots ) Louis Chabot		Goalie stats	John Daigneau ( 19 saves / 21 shots )

== Tournament awards ==
=== All-Tournament Team ===
- F Kevin Du (Harvard)
- F Jimmy Fraser (Harvard)
- F Dan Murphy (Harvard)
- D Ryan O'Byrne (Cornell)
- D Dylan Reese (Harvard)
- G John Dagineau* (Harvard)

* Most Outstanding Player(s)

== Tournament notes ==
- Yale's five overtime win over Union remains the second longest game in tournament history
