= 2005 ECAC Hockey men's ice hockey tournament =

2005 ECAC Hockey Men's ice hockey tournament
- Dates: March 4–19, 2005
- Teams: 12
- Finals site: Pepsi Arena; Albany, New York
- Champions: Cornell (11th title)
- Winning coach: Mike Schafer (4th title)
- MVP: Charlie Cook (Cornell)
- ECAC Hockey Men's Ice Hockey Tournaments

The 2005 ECAC Hockey Men's Ice Hockey Tournament was the 44th tournament in league history. It was played between March 4 and March 19, 2005. Opening round and quarterfinal games were played at home team campus sites, while the final four games were played at the Pepsi Arena (subsequently renamed Times Union Center) in Albany, New York. By winning the tournament, Cornell received the ECAC's automatic bid to the 2005 NCAA Division I Men's Ice Hockey Tournament.

== Conference standings ==
Note: GP = Games played; W = Wins; L = Losses; T = Ties; PTS = Points; GF = Goals For; GA = Goals Against

2004–05 ECAC Hockey standings
	Conference							Overall					
	GP	W	L	T	PTS	GF	GA	GP	W	L	T	GF	GA
#5 Cornell†*	22	18	2	2	38	70	26	35	27	5	3	112	45
#10 Harvard	22	15	5	2	32	71	38	34	21	10	3	98	64
#14 Colgate	22	14	5	3	31	55	38	39	25	11	3	108	78
Vermont	22	13	6	3	29	66	37	39	21	14	4	108	85
Dartmouth	22	14	8	0	28	74	49	35	20	13	2	120	83
Brown	22	9	11	2	20	54	60	33	16	14	3	89	87
St. Lawrence	22	9	12	1	19	70	73	38	17	19	2	116	117
Union	22	8	13	1	17	43	72	37	13	22	2	79	111
Clarkson	22	7	13	2	16	44	66	39	13	23	3	92	120
Princeton	22	6	14	2	14	59	81	31	8	20	3	81	120
Rensselaer	22	6	15	1	13	46	73	38	14	22	2	102	118
Yale	22	3	18	1	7	50	89	32	5	25	2	70	140
Championship: Cornell † indicates conference regular season champion (Cleary Cup) * indicates conference tournament champion (Whitelaw Cup); Final rankings: USA Today/USA Hockey Magazine Top 15 Poll

== Bracket ==
Teams are reseeded after the first round and quarterfinals

First round March 4–6
5	Dartmouth	7	4	5
12	Yale	2	5*	1
6	Brown	7	4	—
11	Rensselaer	4	3	—
7	St. Lawrence	7	4	—
10	Princeton	0	2	—
8	Union	0	2*	3
9	Clarkson	1*	1	4*

Quarterfinals; March 11–13
1	Cornell	5	3*	—
9	Clarkson	0	2	—
2	Harvard	2	3	—
7	St. Lawrence	0	2	—
3	Colgate	4	3	—
6	Brown	1	0	—
4	Vermont	2	3*	2
5	Dartmouth	3	2	1

Semifinals; March 18
1	Cornell	3
4	Vermont	0
2	Harvard	4**
3	Colgate	3

Championship; March 19
1	Cornell	3
2	Harvard	1
Third place
3	Colgate	2
4	Vermont	1

Note: * denotes overtime period(s)

=== First round ===
==== (5) Dartmouth vs. (12) Yale ====
March 4	Dartmouth	7 – 2	Yale	Thompson Arena	Recap
Nick Johnson – 06:55; Sean Offers – 08:17; Lee Stempniak – GW – 12:53; Tanner Glass – SH – 17:28		First period	19:33 - Jean-Francois Boucher
Sean Offers – 00:27; Mike Ouellette – 08:55		Second period	17:19 – Bradley Mills
Eric Przepiorka – PP – 16:50		Third period	No scoring
Dan Yacey ( 18 saves / 20 shots )		Goalie stats	Matt Modelski ( 14 saves / 20 shots ) / Josh Gartner ( 16 saves / 17 shots )

March 5	Dartmouth	4 – 5	OT	Yale	Thompson Arena	Recap
Jarrett Sampson – 03:26		First period		01:01 – Jeff Hristovski
Lee Stempniak – SH – 03:33		Second period		02:25 – PP – Bradley Mills; 15:47 – Will Engasser
Eric Przepiorka – 15:51; Jarrett Sampson – 18:04		Third period		12:43 – Robert Burns
No Scoring		First overtime period		02:41 – GW – Will Engasser
Dan Yacey ( 22 saves / 27 shots )		Goalie stats		Josh Gartner ( 60 saves / 64 shots )

March 6	Dartmouth	5 – 1	Yale	Thompson Arena	Recap
No Scoring		First period	No scoring
Nick Johnson – PP – 09:04; David Jones – GW PP – 16:35; Lee Stempniak – 18:45		Second period	01:06 - Jean-Francois Boucher
Eric Przepiorka – PP – 04:28; Mike Ouellette – 19:41		Third period	No scoring
Dan Yacey ( 18 saves / 19 shots )		Goalie stats	Josh Gartner ( 52 saves / 57 shots )

Dartmouth won series 2–1

==== (6) Brown vs. (11) Rensselaer ====
March 4	Brown	7 – 4	Rensselaer	Meehan Auditorium	Recap
Chris Poli – 03:52; Brian Ihnacak – PP – 07:26		First period	05:59 – PP – Kevin Broad
Sean Hurley – 10:25; Chris Poli – PP – 15:36		Second period	07:12 – PP – Alexander Valentin; 14:51 – PP – Jake Luthi
Brian McNary – GW – 12:25; Mike Meech – 13:38; Chris Swon – EN – 13:38		Third period	11:17 – Kevin Croxton
Adam D'Alba ( 26 saves / 30 shots )		Goalie stats	Andrew Martin ( 18 saves / 24 shots )

March 5	Brown	4 – 3	OT	Rensselaer	Meehan Auditorium	Recap
Jeff Prough – PP – 03:52; Mike Meech – 12:44		First period		10:23 – PP – Alexander Valentin
Gerry Burke – 10:51		Second period		08:24 – Kirk MacDonald; 09:32 – Kevin Croxton
No scoring		Third period		No scoring
Chris Poli – 05:33		First overtime period		No scoring
Adam D'Alba ( 23 saves / 26 shots )		Goalie stats		Andrew Martin ( 23 saves / 27 shots )

Brown won series 2–0

==== (7) St. Lawrence vs. (10) Princeton ====
March 4	St. Lawrence	7 – 0	Princeton	Appleton Arena	Recap
Max Taylor – GW PP – 08:31; John Zeiler – PP – 14:49		First period	No scoring
Mike Zbriger – 09:18; Jim Hakewill – 11:10; Josh Anderson – 16:17		Second period	No scoring
Simon Watson – 07:00; Stace Page – 14:59		Third period	No scoring
Mike McKenna ( 23 saves / 23 shots )		Goalie stats	Eric Leroux ( 25 saves / 28 shots ) / B.J. Sklapsky ( 16 saves / 20 shots )

March 5	St. Lawrence	4 – 2	Princeton	Appleton Arena	Recap
No Scoring		First period	No scoring
Kyle Rank – SH – 03:24		Second period	No scoring
Josh Anderson – 01:08; Matt Macdonald – GW – 18:10; T.J. Trevelyan – EN – 19:19		Third period	07:59 – Dustin Sproat; 13:37 – Dustin Sproat
Mike McKenna ( 20 saves / 22 shots )		Goalie stats	Eric Leroux ( 52 saves / 55 shots )

St. Lawrence won series 2–0

==== (8) Union vs. (9) Clarkson ====
March 4	Union	0 – 1	OT	Clarkson	Achilles Center	Recap
No Scoring		First period		No scoring
No scoring		Second period		No scoring
No scoring		Third period		No scoring
No scoring		First overtime period		15:43 – GW – David Cayer
Justin Mrazek ( 21 saves / 22 shots )		Goalie stats		Dustin Traylen ( 32 saves / 32 shots )

March 5	Union	2 – 1	OT	Clarkson	Achilles Center	Recap
No Scoring		First period		No scoring
No scoring		Second period		03:11 – Michael Grenzy
Torren Delforte – 12:06		Third period		No scoring
Torren Delforte – GW – 10:39		First overtime period		No scoring
Justin Mrazek ( 27 saves / 28 shots )		Goalie stats		Dustin Traylen ( 28 saves / 30 shots )

March 6	Union	3 – 4	OT	Clarkson	Achilles Center	Recap
Olivier Bouchard – PP – 19:04		First period		16:58 – Chris Brekelmans
Jordan Webb – 04:10		Second period		08:52 – PP – Jay Latulippe; 10:47 – Max Kolu
Olivier Bouchard – PP – 16:27		Third period		No scoring
No scoring		First overtime period		18:18 – GW – Shawn Weller
Justin Mrazek ( 40 saves / 44 shots )		Goalie stats		Dustin Traylen ( 31 saves / 34 shots )

Clarkson won series 2–1

=== Quarterfinals ===
==== (1) Cornell vs. (9) Clarkson ====
March 11	Cornell	5 – 0	Clarkson	Lynah Rink	Recap
Mike Knoepfli – GW SH – 07:46; Byron Bitz – PP – 16:16		First period	No scoring
Shane Hynes – PP – 12:09; Mike Iggulden – SH – 14:31; Byron Bitz – PP – 16:15		Second period	No scoring
No scoring		Third period	No scoring
David McKee ( 20 saves / 20 shots )		Goalie stats	Dustin Traylen ( 19 saves / 23 shots ) / Kyle McNulty ( 5 saves / 6 shots )

March 12	Cornell	3 – 2	OT	Clarkson	Lynah Rink	Recap
Shane Hynes – PP – 03:56		First period		01:48 – Jay Latulippe; 11:22 – David Cayer
Matt Moulson – 08:58		Second period		No scoring
No scoring		Third period		No scoring
Topher Scott – GW – 12:00		First overtime period		No scoring
David McKee ( 34 saves / 36 shots )		Goalie stats		Dustin Traylen ( 34 saves / 37 shots )

Cornell won series 2–0

==== (2) Harvard vs. (7) St. Lawrence ====
March 11	Harvard	2 – 0	St. Lawrence	Bright Hockey Center	Recap
No Scoring		First period	No scoring
Charlie Johnson – GW PP – 16:44		Second period	No scoring
Jon Pelle – 13:22		Third period	No scoring
Dov Grumet-Morris ( 33 saves / 33 shots )		Goalie stats	Mike McKenna ( 14 saves / 16 shots )

March 12	Harvard	5 – 3	St. Lawrence	Bright Hockey Center	Recap
No Scoring		First period	No scoring
Brendan Bernakevitch – 05:32; Kevin Du – PP – 17:47		Second period	No scoring
Tyler Magura – GW SH – 10:43		Third period	05:36 – PP – Mike Zbriger; 05:36 – PP – Max Taylor
Dov Grumet-Morris ( 32 saves / 34 shots )		Goalie stats	Mike McKenna ( 26 saves / 29 shots ) / Justin Pesony ( 0 saves / 0 shots )

Harvard won series 2–0

==== (3) Colgate vs. (6) Brown ====
March 11	Colgate	4 – 1	Brown	Starr Rink	Recap
No Scoring		First period	No scoring
Adam Mitchell – PP – 13:37; Jon Smyth – GW – 17:50		Second period	08:30 – PP – Brian McNary
Mike Campaner – PP – 03:53; Dustin Gillanders – PP – 14:38		Third period	No scoring
Steve Silverhorn ( 11 saves / 12 shots )		Goalie stats	Adam D'Alba ( 28 saves / 32 shots )

March 12	Colgate	3 – 0	Brown	Starr Rink	Recap
No Scoring		First period	No scoring
Anthony Masotto – GW PP – 06:52; Tyler Burton – 13:26		Second period	No scoring
Dave Thomas – 17:12		Third period	No scoring
Steve Silverhorn ( 19 saves / 19 shots )		Goalie stats	Adam D'Alba ( 26 saves / 29 shots )

Colgate won series 2–0

==== (4) Vermont vs. (5) Dartmouth ====
March 11	Dartmouth	2 – 3	Vermont	Gutterson Fieldhouse	Recap
Andy Corran – PP – 01:55		First period	12:49 – Nick Johnson
Scott Mifsud – 02:48		Second period	15:59 – Mike Ouellette
No Scoring		Third period	02:34 – Lee Stempniak
Joe Fallon ( 26 saves / 29 shots )		Goalie stats	Dan Yacey ( 18 saves / 20 shots )

March 12	Dartmouth	3 – 2	OT	Vermont	Gutterson Fieldhouse	Recap
Baron Becker – 06:30; Jeff Corey – PP – 15:13		First period		No scoring
No Scoring		Second period		07:11 – David Jones
No Scoring		Third period		12:02 – Nick Johnson
Chris Myers – GW PP – 17:34		First overtime period		No scoring
Joe Fallon ( 24 saves / 26 shots )		Goalie stats		Dan Yacey ( 32 saves / 35 shots )

March 13	Dartmouth	2 – 1	Vermont	Gutterson Fieldhouse	Recap
Jaime Sifers – PP – 06:05		First period	No scoring
No scoring		Second period	No scoring
Mark Lutz – GW PP – 06:02		Third period	02:10 – Eric Przepiorka
Joe Fallon ( 24 saves / 25 shots )		Goalie stats	Dan Yacey ( 24 saves / 26 shots )

Vermont won series 2–1

=== Semifinals ===
==== (1) Cornell vs. (4) Vermont ====
March 18	Cornell	3 – 0	Vermont	Pepsi Arena	Recap
Topher Scott – GW – 13:22		First period	No scoring
Matt Moulson – PP – 09:56		Second period	No scoring
Chris Abbott – EN – 18:42		Third period	No scoring
David McKee ( 25 saves / 25 shots )		Goalie stats	Joe Fallon ( 19 saves / 21 shots )

==== (2) Harvard vs. (3) Colgate ====
March 18	Harvard	4 – 3	2OT	Colgate	Pepsi Arena	Recap
No Scoring		First period		No scoring
Dan Murphy – PP – 06:38		Second period		No scoring
Charlie Johnson – 16:01; Tom Cavanagh – 18:03		Third period		00:27 – Jon Smyth; 16:46 – Joey Mormina; 18:39 – Joey Mormina
Kevin Du – GW – 16:01		Second overtime period		No scoring
Dov Grumet-Morris ( 46 saves / 49 shots )		Goalie stats		Steve Silverhorn ( 47 saves / 51 shots )

=== Third place ===
==== (3) Colgate vs. (4) Vermont ====
March 19	Colgate	2 – 1	Vermont	Pepsi Arena	Recap
Tyler Burton – PP – 05:17; Joey Mormina – GW PP – 19:39		First period	No scoring
No Scoring		Second period	08:24 – PP – Matt Syroczynski
No scoring		Third period	No scoring
Steve Silverhorn ( 34 saves / 35 shots )		Goalie stats	Joe Fallon ( 18 saves / 20 shots )

=== Championship ===
==== (1) Cornell vs. (2) Harvard ====
March 18	Cornell	3 – 1	Harvard	Pepsi Arena	Recap
No Scoring		First period	18:23 – PP – Dylan Reese
Paul Varteressian – 09:35; Charlie Cook – 10:30		Second period	No scoring
Charlie Cook – PP – 06:35		Third period	No scoring
David McKee ( 17 saves / 18 shots )		Goalie stats	Dov Grumet-Morris ( 29 saves / 32 shots )

== Tournament awards ==
=== All-Tournament Team ===
- F Kevin Du (Harvard)
- F Matt Moulson (Cornell)
- F Daniel Pegoraro (Cornell)
- D Charlie Cook* (Cornell)
- D Joey Mormina (Colgate)
- G David McKee (Cornell)

* Most Outstanding Player(s)
