= 2008 ECAC Hockey men's ice hockey tournament =

2008 ECAC Men's ice hockey tournament
- Dates: March 7–22, 2008
- Teams: 12
- Finals site: Times Union Center; Albany, New York
- Champions: Princeton (2nd title)
- Winning coach: Guy Gadowsky (1st title)
- MVP: Zane Kalemba (Princeton)
- ECAC Men's Ice Hockey Tournaments

The 2008 ECAC Hockey Men's Ice Hockey Tournament was the 47th tournament in league history. It was played between March 7 and March 22, 2008. First Round and Quarterfinal games were played at home team campus sites, while the final four games were played at the Times Union Center in Albany, New York. By winning the tournament, Princeton received the ECAC Hockey automatic bid to the 2008 NCAA Division I Men's Ice Hockey Tournament.

== Format ==
The tournament featured four rounds of play. The teams that finish above fifth place in the standings receive a bye to the quarterfinal round. In the first round, the fifth and twelfth seeds, the sixth and eleventh seeds, the seventh and tenth seeds and the eighth and ninth seeds played a best-of-three series with the winners advancing to the quarterfinals. In the quarterfinals the one seed plays the lowest remaining seed, the second seed plays the second-lowest remaining seed, the third seed plays the third-lowest remaining seed and the fourth seed plays the fourth-lowest remaining seed another best-of-three series with the winners of these the series advancing to the Semifinals. In the semifinals the top remaining seed plays the lowest remaining seed while the two remaining teams play against each other. The winners of the semifinals play in the championship game while the losers play in a third-place game. All series after the quarterfinals are single-elimination games. The tournament champion receives an automatic bid to the 2008 NCAA Men's Division I Ice Hockey Tournament.

== Conference standings ==
Note: GP = Games played; W = Wins; L = Losses; T = Ties; PTS = Points; GF = Goals For; GA = Goals Against

2007–08 ECAC Hockey standings
	Conference							Overall					
	GP	W	L	T	PTS	GF	GA	GP	W	L	T	GF	GA
#10 Clarkson†	22	15	4	3	33	72	47	39	22	13	4	108	93
#11 Princeton*	22	14	8	0	28	75	57	35	21	14	0	112	95
Harvard	22	12	7	3	27	59	41	34	17	13	4	98	79
Union	22	10	7	5	25	50	57	35	15	14	6	79	91
Cornell	22	12	9	1	25	60	43	36	19	14	3	102	78
Quinnipiac	22	9	9	4	22	62	67	39	20	15	4	120	118
Yale	22	9	9	4	22	58	61	34	16	14	4	93	94
Colgate	22	8	9	5	21	58	55	42	18	18	6	113	104
St. Lawrence	22	7	13	2	16	58	68	37	13	20	4	103	109
Rensselaer	22	6	13	3	15	45	69	38	11	23	4	79	113
Brown	22	6	13	3	15	50	68	31	6	21	4	67	108
Dartmouth	22	6	13	3	15	64	78	32	12	16	4	98	107
Championship: Princeton † indicates conference regular season champion (Cleary Cup) * indicates conference tournament champion (Whitelaw Cup); Final rankings: USA Today/USA Hockey Magazine Top 15 Poll

== Bracket ==
Teams are reseeded after the First Round and Quarterfinals

First Round; March 7–9
5	Cornell	3	3	6
12	Dartmouth	2	5	0
6	Quinnipiac	7*	7	–
11	Brown	6	1	–
7	Yale	3***	3*	–
10	Rensselaer	2	2	–
8	Colgate	2	3	3
9	St. Lawrence	5	2	1

Quarterfinals; March 14–16
1	Clarkson	1	3	2
8	Colgate	0	4	3**
2	Princeton	3	3	4
7	Yale	0	4	0
3	Harvard	11	4	3
6	Quinnipiac	0	7	1
4	Union	2	2	–
5	Cornell	3	3	–

Semifinals; March 21
2	Princeton	3
8	Colgate	0
3	Harvard	3
5	Cornell	2

Championship; March 22
2	Princeton	4
3	Harvard	1
Third Place
5	Cornell	4
8	Colgate	2

Note: * denotes overtime period(s)

=== First round ===
==== (5) Cornell vs. (12) Dartmouth ====
March 7	Cornell	3 – 2	Dartmouth	Lynah Rink
No Scoring		First period	No scoring
(Nash, Kennedy) Colin Greening - 01:02 (Nash) Raymond Sawada - 13:25		Second period	03:11 - PP - Andrew Owsiak (Gaudet, Grecu); 13:00 - Joe Stejskal (unassisted)
(Devin, Scott) Raymond Sawada - GW PP - 13:46		Third period	No scoring
( 23 saves / 25 shots ) Ben Scrivens		Goalie stats	Mike Devine ( 31 saves / 34 shots )

March 8	Cornell	3 – 5	Dartmouth	Lynah Rink
No Scoring		First period	17:36 - Adam Estoclet (Boldt, Reber)
(Kennedy, Greening) Riley Nash - 16:58		Second period	16:41 - Joe Gaudet (Gillam); 18:05 - Brandon Harrington (Pritchard, Grecu)
(Scott, Sawada) Michael Kennedy - 03:05 (Nash, Scott) Raymond Sawada - EA PP - 17:38		Third period	06:56 - GW SH - Rob Pritchard (Fleming, Boldt); 19:22 - EN - Rob Pritchard (Johnson, Stephens)
( 25 saves / 29 shots ) Ben Scrivens		Goalie stats	Mike Devine ( 40 saves / 43 shots )

March 9	Cornell	6 – 0	Dartmouth	Lynah Rink
(Scott, Kennedy) Raymond Sawada - GW PP - 19:00		First period	No scoring
(Kennedy, Sawada) Brendon Nash - 04:23 (Barlow) Blake Gallagher - 08:56 (Krueger, Scrivens) Raymond Sawada - 12:18		Second period	No scoring
(Greening) Mike Devin - 02:17 (Nash, Greening) Patrick Kennedy - 13:20		Third period	No scoring
( 32 saves / 32 shots ) Ben Scrivens		Goalie stats	Mike Devine ( 22 saves / 28 shots )

Cornell won series 2–1

==== (6) Quinnipiac vs. (11) Brown ====
March 7	Quinnipiac	7 – 6	OT	Brown	TD Banknorth Center	Recap
No Scoring		First period		18:03 - Sean Muncy (Brownschidle)
(Henningson) Brandon Wong - 00:41 (Leitch, Bates) Ben Nelson - 00:58 (Leitch, Marshall) Ben Nelson - 02:00 (Bates) Bryan Leitch - 02:50 (Bates, Hansen) Bryan Leitch - PP - 04:53 (Dickinson, Leitch) Jamie Bates - 18:48		Second period		10:34 - PP - Ryan Garbutt (Prough, Hurley); 17:49 - PP - Chris Poli (Hurley, Prough)
No scoring		Third period		12:59 - Sean McMonagle (Baiser, Robertson); 15:14 - PP - Ryan Garbutt (Poli, Timberlake); 19:54 - EA - Jeff Prough (Vokes, Robertson)
(Lampe) David Marshall - GW - 11:58		First overtime period		No scoring
( 24 saves / 30 shots ) Bud Fisher		Goalie stats		Dan Rosen ( 18 saves / 23 shots ) / Mark Sibbald ( 19 saves / 21 shots )

March 8	Quinnipiac	7 – 1	Brown	TD Banknorth Center	Recap
(Holt, Leitch) Jamie Bates - PP - 07:01		First period	17:24 - PP - Ryan Garbutt (Timberlake, Prough)
(Hansen, Nelson) Brandon Wong - GW - 02:22 (Bates, Nelson) Greg Holt - PP - 04:04 (Travis, Holt) Brandon Wong - 09:20 (Hansen, Meyer) Dan Lefort - 14:22		Second period	No scoring
(Holt, Nelson) Jamie Bates - PP - 05:11 (Wong) Dan Travis - 12:43		Third period	No scoring
( 25 saves / 26 shots ) Bud Fisher / ( 1 saves / 1 shots ) Dan Cullen		Goalie stats	Dan Rosen ( 8 saves / 12 shots ) / Mark Sibbald ( 11 saves / 14 shots )

Quinnipiac won series 2–0

==== (7) Yale vs. (10) Rensselaer ====
March 7	Yale	3 – 2	3OT	Rensselaer	Ingalls Rink
(Arcobello) Chris Cahill - 05:42 (Matczak, Martin) Matthew Thorney - PP - 13:35		First period		16:43 - Garrett Vassel (Kerins); 19:18 - Scott Halpern (Helfrich, Polacek)
No scoring		Second period		No scoring
No scoring		Third period		No scoring
(Kearney) Broc Little - GW - 05:40		Third overtime period		No scoring
( 27 saves / 29 shots ) Alec Richards		Goalie stats		Mathias Lange ( 53 saves / 56 shots )

March 8	Yale	3 – 2	OT	Rensselaer	Ingalls Rink
No Scoring		First period		18:17 - Tyler Helfrich (Polacek, Merth); 19:07 - Jonathan Ornelas (Burgdoerfer)
(Little) Ryan Donald - 01:47		Second period		No scoring
(Kearney) Broc Little - 14:39		Third period		No scoring
(Ronald, Cahill) Sean Backman - GW - 05:11		First overtime period		No scoring
( 16 saves / 18 shots ) Alec Richards		Goalie stats		Mathias Lange ( 35 saves / 38 shots )

Yale won series 2–0

==== (8) Colgate vs. (9) St. Lawrence ====
March 7	Colgate	2 – 5	St. Lawrence	Starr Rink	Recap
No Scoring		First period	15:44 - Jared Ross (Fensel, Griffin)
No scoring		Second period	04:28 - Zach Miskovic (McKenzie, McBride); 10:47 - GW - Sean Flanagan (Griffin, Muir); 19:42 - PP - Zach Miskovic (DeVergilio, McBride)
(Williams, Anderson) Ethan Cox - 01:16 (Cox, Torti) Jason Williams - 19:26		Third period	16:25 - Travis Vermeulen (McBride)
( 21 saves / 25 shots ) Mark Dekanich / ( 11 saves / 12 shots ) Justin Kowalkoski		Goalie stats	John Hallas ( 30 saves / 32 shots )

March 8	Colgate	3 – 2	St. Lawrence	Starr Rink	Recap
(McNamara, Burton) Ben Camper - 13:50		First period	No scoring
(Fredricks, Bogdanich) Tyler Burton - 01:11 (McNamara, Winchester) Tyler Burton - GW - 10:15		Second period	00:48 - Travis Vermeulen (Generous); 15:31 - Casey Parenteau (Bogosian, Ross)
No scoring		Third period	No scoring
( 31 saves / 33 shots ) Mark Dekanich		Goalie stats	John Hallas ( 30 saves / 33 shots )

March 9	Colgate	3 – 1	St. Lawrence	Starr Rink	Recap
(Bogdanich, Burton) Ben Camper - 18:08		First period	No scoring
No scoring		Second period	No scoring
(Camper) Tyler Burton - GW - 00:29 (McNamara, Winchester) Tyler Burton - PP - 07:47		Third period	07:47 - PP - Charlie Griffin (McBride)
( 31 saves / 32 shots ) Mark Dekanich		Goalie stats	John Hallas ( 26 saves / 29 shots )

Colgate won series 2–1

=== Quarterfinals ===
==== (1) Clarkson vs. (8) Colgate ====
March 14	Clarkson	1 – 0	Colgate	Cheel Arena	Recap
(Clitsome, D'Alvise) Steven Zalewski - GW PP - 16:24		First period	No scoring
No scoring		Second period	No scoring
No scoring		Third period	No scoring
( 19 saves / 19 shots ) David Leggio		Goalie stats	Mark Dekanich ( 24 saves / 25 shots )

March 15	Clarkson	3 – 4	Colgate	Cheel Arena	Recap
(Beca, Zalewski) Nick Dodge - 04:18 (Dodge, DeFazio) David Cayer - 16:17		First period	04:18 - Tom Riley (Day, McIntyre); 14:12 - Ethan Cox (Gillanders)
(Beca, Mason) Steven Zalewski - 12:06		Second period	09:44 - David McIntyre (Day, Riley)
No scoring		Third period	01:58 - GW - David McIntyre (Day, Sloane)
( 23 saves / 27 shots ) David Leggio		Goalie stats	Mark Dekanich ( 21 saves / 24 shots )

March 16	Clarkson	2 – 3	2OT	Colgate	Cheel Arena	Recap
(Tuohimaa) Chris D'Alvise - SH - 10:08		First period		No scoring
No scoring		Second period		01:14 - PP - Tyler Burton (Poplawski, Winchester); 16:44 - PP - David McIntyre (Riley, McNamara)
(Mason, Dodge) Scott Freeman - 04:57		Third period		No scoring
No scoring		Second overtime period		07:36 - GW - David McIntyre (Riley, McNamara)
( 29 saves / 32 shots ) David Leggio		Goalie stats		Mark Dekanich ( 52 saves / 54 shots )

Colgate won series 2–1

==== (2) Princeton vs. (7) Yale ====
March 14	Princeton	3 – 0	Yale	Hobey Baker Memorial Rink	Recap
(Wilson) Lee Jubinville - GW - 00:39 (Kaiser) Mike Moore - 04:17		First period	No scoring
(Moore, Fedun) Matt Arhontas - PP - 10:55		Second period	No scoring
No scoring		Third period	No scoring
( 30 saves / 30 shots ) Zane Kalemba		Goalie stats	Alec Richards ( 35 saves / 38 shots )

March 15	Princeton	3 – 4	Yale	Hobey Baker Memorial Rink	Recap
(Magnowski, Kramer) Matt Arhontas - PP - 06:31 (Wilson, Moore) Cam MacIntyre - PP - 07:17		First period	09:28 - PP - Thomas Dignard (Little, Backman); 12:08 - Jean-Francois Boucher (Dignard, Anderson)
No scoring		Second period	00:18 - Brendan Mason (Dignard, Anderson); 10:18 - GW - Broc Little (Kearney)
(Wilson) Cam MacIntyre - EA - 19:01		Third period	No scoring
( 22 saves / 26 shots ) Zane Kalemba		Goalie stats	Billy Blase ( 32 saves / 35 shots )

March 16	Princeton	4 – 0	Yale	Hobey Baker Memorial Rink	Recap
(Fedun) Brett Wilson - GW PP - 03:27 (Magnowski, Arhontas) Cam MacIntyre - 14:24		First period	No scoring
(Kaiser, Hagel) Brandan Kushniruk - 16:26		Second period	No scoring
(Moore, Fedun) Matt Arhontas - SH - 05:41		Third period	No scoring
( 31 saves / 31 shots ) Zane Kalemba		Goalie stats	Billy Blase ( 28 saves / 32 shots )

Princeton won series 2–1

==== (3) Harvard vs. (6) Quinnipiac ====
March 14	Harvard	11 – 0	Quinnipiac	Bright Hockey Center	Recap
(Rogers, Biega) Mike Taylor - GW - 03:03 (Mientel, Biega) Dave Watters - 05:33		First period	No scoring
(MacDonald, Magura) Steve Rolecek - 09:29 (Taylor, Rogers) Matt McCollem - 10:51 (McCollem, Dufault) Dave Watters - PP - 15:09 (McCollem, Taylor) Doug Rogers - 17:28 (Watters, Meintel) Pier-Olivier Michaud - 19:37		Second period	No scoring
(Biega, Taylor) Jon Pelle - PP - 01:15 (Fraser, McCollem) Dave Watters - PP - 03:34 (Watters, Meintel) Dave MacDonald - 05:36 (Magura, Fraser) Steve Rolecek - 12:56		Third period	No scoring
( 27 saves / 27 shots ) Kyle Richter / ( 2 saves / 2 shots ) John Riley		Goalie stats	Bud Fisher ( 19 saves / 24 shots ) / Pat McGann ( 12 saves / 17 shots ) / Dan Cullen ( 6 saves / 7 shots )

March 15	Harvard	4 – 7	Quinnipiac	Bright Hockey Center	Recap
(Watters) Pier-Olivier Michaud - 13:10 (Taylor, Rogers) Jon Pelle - PP - 18:19		First period	02:43 - PP - Jamie Bates (Henningson, Nelson); 08:10 - Ben Nelson (Tranvik, Lampe); 16:48 - PP - Dan Henningson (Bates, Nelson)
(Michaud, Watters) Alex Meintel - 11:44		Second period	00:19 - PP - Jamie Bates (Henningson, Nelson); 02:54 - GW PP - Dan Henningson (Nelson, Wong); 19:34 - SH - Eric Lampe (unassisted)
(Michaud, Watters) Alex Meintel - 12:25		Third period	19:33 - EN - Andrew Meyer (unassisted)
( 20 saves / 26 shots ) Kyle Richter		Goalie stats	Bud Fisher ( 41 saves / 45 shots )

March 16	Harvard	3 – 1	Quinnipiac	Bright Hockey Center	Recap
(unassisted) Mike Taylor - SH - 13:07		First period	No scoring
(Taylor, Biega) Doug Rogers - GW PP - 11:34		Second period	10:57 - Bryan Leitch (Hansen, Nelson)
(Rogers, Tallett) Mike Taylor - 14:45		Third period	No scoring
( 26 saves / 27 shots ) Kyle Richter		Goalie stats	Bud Fisher ( 26 saves / 29 shots )

Harvard won series 2–1

==== (4) Union vs. (5) Cornell ====
March 14	Union	2 – 3	Cornell	Achilles Center	Recap
(Wakita, Presizniuk) Torren Delforte - 16:06		First period	01:00 - Chris Fontas (Mugford, Scali)
No scoring		Second period	09:25 - Chris Fontas (unassisted)
(Boileau, Shaffer) Michael Beynon - 11:32		Third period	14:17 - GW PP - Brendon Nash (Krantz, Greening)
( 24 saves / 27 shots ) Justin Mrazek		Goalie stats	Ben Scrivens ( 24 saves / 26 shots )

March 15	Union	2 – 3	Cornell	Achilles Center	Recap
(Presizniuk, Cook) Stephane Boileau - PP - 08:16		First period	No scoring
No scoring		Second period	02:18 - Patrick Kennedy (Greening, Nash); 11:30 - PP - Blake Gallagher (Nash, Nash)
(Boileau, Valery-Trabucco) Lane Caffaro - 03:16		Third period	08:40 - GW PP - Evan Barlow (Gallagher, Greening)
( 18 saves / 21 shots ) Corey Milan		Goalie stats	Ben Scrivens ( 41 saves / 43 shots )

Cornell won series 2–0

=== Semifinals ===
==== (2) Princeton vs. (8) Colgate ====
March 21	Princeton	3 – 0	Colgate	Times Union Center	Recap
No Scoring		First period	No scoring
No scoring		Second period	No scoring
(Magnowski) Matt Arhontas - GW - 08:04 (Shattenkirk, Stankievech) Kevin Lohry - 14:44 (Shattenkirk) Kevin Lohry - EN - 19:39		Third period	No scoring
( 27 saves / 27 shots ) Zane Kalemba		Goalie stats	Mark Dekanich ( 19 saves / 21 shots )

==== (3) Harvard vs. (5) Cornell ====
March 21	Harvard	3 – 1	Cornell	Times Union Center	Recap
No Scoring		First period	No scoring
(McCafferty, Fraser) Dave Watters - PP - 03:35 (Rogers, Taylor) Jon Pelle - GW PP - 05:02		Second period	06:57 - Topher Scott (Sawada, Kennedy)
(Biega, Taylor) Jon Pelle - PP - 17:24		Third period	No scoring
( 31 saves / 32 shots ) Kyle Richter		Goalie stats	Ben Scrivens ( 30 saves / 33 shots )

=== Third place ===
==== (5) Cornell vs. (8) Colgate ====
March 22	Cornell	4 – 2	Colgate	Times Union Center	Recap
(Kennedy) Doug Kantz - 13:45		First period	16:04 - Sean Carty (Werner, DeBello)
(Devin, Kennedy) Raymond Sawada - PP - 07:31 (Scott, Kennedy) Justin Krueger - GW PP - 08:57		Second period	No scoring
(Nash, Nash) Colin Greening - PP - 03:16		Third period	18:35 - Tyler Burton (Camper, Fredricks)
( 22 saves / 23 shots ) Ben Scrivens / ( 3 saves / 4 shots ) Dan DiLeo		Goalie stats	Mark Dekanitch ( 12 saves / 15 shots ) / Justin Kowalkoski ( 8 saves / 9 shots )

=== Championship ===
==== (2) Princeton vs. (3) Harvard ====
March 22	Princeton	4 – 1	Harvard	Times Union Center	Recap
(Kushniruk, Hagel) Mike Moore - 05:04		First period	No scoring
(Moore) Landis Stankievech - GW - 12:34		Second period	No scoring
(MacIntyre) Brett Wilson - PP - 16:54 (unassisted) Mark Magnowski - EN - 18:22		Third period	00:24 - PP - Jon Pelle (Taylor, Biega)
( 35 saves / 36 shots ) Zane Kalemba		Goalie stats	Kyle Richter ( 24 saves / 27 shots )

== Tournament awards ==
=== All-Tournament Team ===
- F Mike Kennedy (Cornell)
- F Kevin Lohry* (Princeton)
- F Jon Pelle (Harvard)
- D Alex Biega (Harvard)
- D Mike Moore (Princeton)
- G Zane Kalemba* (Princeton)

* Most Outstanding Player(s)
