= 2010 ECHL All-Star Game =

	1	2	3	OT	SO	Total
American	2	5	2	0	1	10
National	3	2	4	0	0	9
- Date: January 20, 2010
- Arena: Citizens Business Bank Arena
- City: Ontario, California
- MVP: Evan Barlow
- Attendance: 7,615

The 2010 ECHL All-Star Game presented by Reebok was the held at the Citizens Business Bank Arena in Ontario, California, United States, home of the Ontario Reign. The game was held between two teams, each representing a conference (American and National) of the ECHL.

The game was part of a two-day event of activities. On Tuesday, a skills competition among the ECHL players, called the ECHL All-Star Skills Competition presented by Reebok Hockey and was also sponsored by Toyota and the city of Ontario, California. It was the 13th edition of the skills challenge. The All-Star Game itself was played on a Wednesday evening.

== Skills Competition ==
The 13th edition of the skills competition was held on the evening of Tuesday, January 19, 2010. The competition included seven individual competitions that tested the participants' hockey skills, each of which was sponsored. Sponsors for the event included ice hockey equipment maker Sher-Wood Hockey (both puck control relays), athletic apparel company Reebok (fastest skater and hardest shot), outdoor barbecue grill producer Bull Outdoor Products (rapid fire), game-worn jersey supplier MeiGray Group (accuracy shooting competition) and Southern California-based ice hockey rink company Ice Town (breakaway relay).

The first competition of the night was the Sher-Wood Hockey Puck Control Relay which consisted of three players from each conference, was won by the National Conference team of Evan Barlow (Idaho), Chris d'Alvise (Stockton) and John Lammers (Alaska). The Sher-Wood Hockey Individual Puck Control Relay followed and was won by the National Conference's Peter Lenes (Ontario) who defeated the American Conference's Jacob Micflikier (Florida).

The next event was the Reebok Faster Skater, a time trial style race around the rink which consisted of three members from each conference was won by the National Conference with an average time of 14.406 seconds to the American Conference's 14.462. The National Conference's Adam Miller (Las Vegas) had the fastest individual time at 14.287. The Reebok 8.0.8 Hardest Shot competition was won by the American Conference with an average slap shot speed of 97.9 m.p.h. to 94.7 m.p.h. The American Conference's A. J. Thelen (Florida) had the hardest shot at 101.9 m.p.h.

The Bull Outdoor Products Rapid Fire competition tested a goaltender's skills with the player facing 10 shots, alternating from each face off circle. All six goaltenders that were selected to the All-Star Game competed. The American Conference won the competition with a score of 22 saves to 20 and the American Conference's Braden Holtby (South Carolina) had the most saves with nine.

The MeiGray Group Accuracy Shooting Competition consisted of three players from each conference attempting to hit four targets placed at each corner of the net. The players had six shots to hit the four total targets. The National Conference won the competition hitting 11 targets to the American Conference's 9 and the National Conference's Ryan Kinasewich (Utah) had the best score hitting four targets in four shots.

The final competition of the evening was the Ice Town Breakaway Relay which would have each of the six goaltenders facing off against six shooters from the opposing conference's team and an amateur player, with each goaltender attempting to block each participant on a breakaway. The American Conference won the event with 7 goals scored to the National Conference's 5. The American Conference's Braden Holtby had the best score, stopping six of seven shooters and won the Outstanding Goaltender award having stopped a total of 15 shots through the two goaltender competitions.

The National Conference would win the overall competition with a score of 11 to 10, winning the skills competition for the third straight time and the fifth time in the past six skills competitions.

== Rosters ==
The National Conference roster was announced on December 30, 2009 and the American Conference roster was announced the following day.

	National Conference	American Conference
Coach:	(Canada) Derek Laxdal (Idaho Steelheads)	(Canada) Cail MacLean (South Carolina Stingrays)
Assistant Coach:	(Canada) Marty Raymond (Bakersfield Condors)	(Canada) Derek Wilkinson (Charlotte Checkers)
Captains:	(Canada) David Walker	(Canada) J. C. Sawyer
Starters:	(Canada) 1 – G David Shantz (Victoria Salmon Kings) (Canada) 6 – D Sasha Pokulok (Bakersfield Condors) (Canada) 27 – D David Walker (Ontario Reign) – (C) (Canada) 21 – F Greg Hogeboom (Ontario Reign) (Canada) 9 – F Ryan Kinasewich (Utah Grizzlies) (Canada) 20 – F John Lammers (Alaska Aces)	(Canada) 34 – G Todd Ford (South Carolina Stingrays) (Canada) 12 – D J. C. Sawyer (Toledo Walleye) – (C) (United States) 4 – D Zach Tarkir (South Carolina Stingrays) (Canada) 27 – F Justin Donati (Elmira Jackals) (United States) 76 – F Ben Gordon (Reading Royals) (Canada) 11 – F Jacob Micflikier (Florida Everblades)
Reserves:	(United States) 31 – G Richard Bachman (Idaho Steelheads) (Germany) 33 – G Timo Pielmeier (Bakersfield Condors) (Canada) 7 – D Vic Bartley (Utah Grizzlies) (Canada) 2 – D Taylor Ellington (Victoria Salmon Kings) (United States) 17 – D Brendan Milnamow (Idaho Steelheads) (Canada) 29 – D Eric Regan (Bakersfield Condors) (Canada) 19 – F Evan Barlow (Idaho Steelheads) (Canada) 23 – F Judd Blackwater (Stockton Thunder) (Canada) 8 – F Chris d'Alvise (Stockton Thunder) (United States) 3 – F Peter Lenes (Ontario Reign) (United States) 42 – F Nick Mazzolini (Alaska Aces) (United States) 12 – F Adam Miller (Las Vegas Wranglers) (Canada) 37 – F A. J. Perry (Utah Grizzlies) (United States) 22 – F John Swanson (Idaho Steelheads) (United States) 18 – F Shawn Weller (Bakersfield Condors)	(Canada) 31 – G Braden Holtby (South Carolina Stingrays) (United States) 30 – G Jeremy Smith (Cincinnati Cyclones) (United States) 23 – D Mitch Ganzak (Wheeling Nailers) (Canada) 6 – D Drew Paris (Gwinnett Gladiators) (Canada) 7 – D Sam Roberts (Gwinnett Gladiators) (United States) 49 – D A. J. Thelen (Florida Everblades) (Canada) 84 – F Brandon Buck (Florida Everblades) (Canada) 19 – F Rick Cleaver (Kalamazoo Wings) (Russia) 93 – F Maxime Gratchev (Elmira Jackals) (Russia) 17 – F Nikita Kashirsky (South Carolina) (Canada) 20 – F Matt Pierce (Cincinnati Cyclones) (United States) 43 – F Jeff Prough (Trenton Devils) (United States) 24 – F Matt Schepke (Charlotte Checkers) (Canada) 15 – F Connor Shields (Johnstown Chiefs) (Canada) 61 – F Maxime Tanguay (Toledo Walleye)
