= Joey Mormina =

Canadian ice hockey player

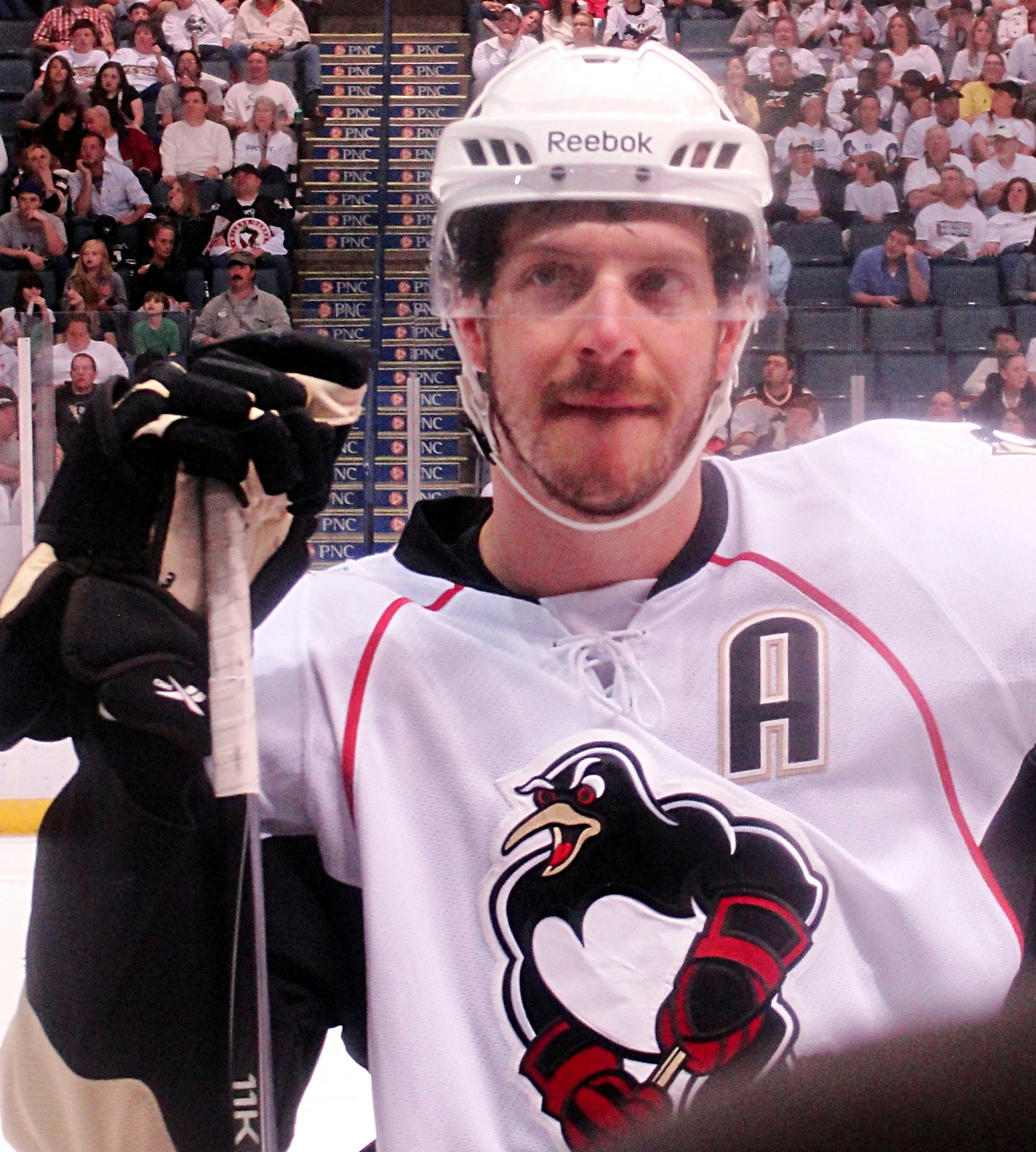
- Mormina with the Wilkes-Barre/Scranton Penguins in 2012
- Born: June 29, 1982 (age 44) Montreal, Quebec, Canada
- Height: 6 ft 6 in (198 cm)
- Weight: 220 lb (100 kg; 15 st 10 lb)
- Position: Defence
- Shot: Left
- Played for: Carolina Hurricanes
- NHL draft: 193rd overall, 2002; Philadelphia Flyers
- Playing career: 2005–2016

Joey Mormina (born June 29, 1982) is a Canadian former professional ice hockey defenceman who was a veteran of the American Hockey League (AHL) playing in 670 regular season games. He played a solitary game in the National Hockey League (NHL) with the Carolina Hurricanes.

== Playing career ==
Mormina was drafted 193rd overall by the Philadelphia Flyers in the 2002 NHL entry draft from Colgate University. Without a contract from the Flyers, Mormina began his professional career by playing two seasons with the Manchester Monarchs, the AHL affiliate of the Los Angeles Kings.

On July 2, 2007, Mormina signed with the Carolina Hurricanes and received his first callup to the NHL. Mormina consequently played in one game for the Hurricanes before being sent back to the AHL. On July 8, 2008, Mormina signed with the Pittsburgh Penguins and spent the entire 2008–09 season with the Wilkes-Barre/Scranton Penguins. On July 9, 2009, Mormina returned to the franchise that originally drafted him, signing a one-year contract with the Philadelphia Flyers.

On August 5, 2010, Mormina signed a contract with the DEL's Kassel Huskies. However, the Huskies declaring bankruptcy on August 27, 2010, Mormina became an unrestricted free agent again. On September 7, 2010, Mormina signed a contract with the EC Red Bull Salzburg of the Erste Bank Hockey League. After featuring in a European pre-season tournament, Mormina sought a release from Salzburg and returned to North America, returning to Wilkes-Barre/Scranton Penguins for the 2010–11 season.

During the 2015–16 season, while in his third year with the Syracuse Crunch, Mormina was traded to the Rochester Americans for future considerations on March 4, 2016. Upon the conclusion of the season with the Americans, Mormina ended his professional career after 11 seasons in accepting an assistant coaching role with the Mercyhurst University on September 21, 2016.

== Career statistics ==
			Regular season					Playoffs
Season	Team	League	GP	G	A	Pts	PIM	GP	G	A	Pts	PIM
1998–99	Gatineau L'Intrépide	QMAAA	39	0	3	3	47	—	—	—	—	—
1999–2000	Holderness School	HS Prep
2000–01	Holderness School	HS Prep	29	15	15	30		—	—	—	—	—
2001–02	Colgate University	ECAC	34	2	13	15	28	—	—	—	—	—
2002–03	Colgate University	ECAC	40	4	9	13	28	—	—	—	—	—
2003–04	Colgate University	ECAC	28	2	10	12	26	—	—	—	—	—
2004–05	Colgate University	ECAC	39	8	8	16	50	—	—	—	—	—
2005–06	Manchester Monarchs	AHL	61	0	13	13	70	7	0	0	0	4
2006–07	Manchester Monarchs	AHL	62	2	9	11	108	1	0	0	0	2
2007–08	Albany River Rats	AHL	77	4	9	13	96	7	0	0	0	4
2007–08	Carolina Hurricanes	NHL	1	0	0	0	0	—	—	—	—	—
2008–09	Wilkes–Barre/Scranton Penguins	AHL	70	2	9	11	71	12	0	0	0	12
2009–10	Adirondack Phantoms	AHL	77	5	18	23	102	—	—	—	—	—
2010–11	Wilkes–Barre/Scranton Penguins	AHL	50	2	9	11	44	12	0	0	0	16
2011–12	Wilkes–Barre/Scranton Penguins	AHL	59	6	15	21	70	12	1	1	2	10
2012–13	Wilkes–Barre/Scranton Penguins	AHL	54	3	7	10	60	15	1	7	8	36
2013–14	Syracuse Crunch	AHL	56	3	10	13	86	—	—	—	—	—
2014–15	Syracuse Crunch	AHL	54	4	16	20	70	3	0	0	0	0
2015–16	Syracuse Crunch	AHL	30	0	3	3	24	—	—	—	—	—
2015–16	Rochester Americans	AHL	20	0	3	3	36	—	—	—	—	—
AHL totals			670	31	121	152	837	66	2	8	10	84
NHL totals			1	0	0	0	0	—	—	—	—	—

== Awards and honors ==
Award	Year
ECAC Hockey All-Tournament Team	2005

== See also ==
- List of players who played only one game in the NHL

Awards and achievements
Preceded by Ryan Craig	Captain of the Wilkes-Barre/Scranton Penguins; 2012-13	Succeeded by Tom Kostopoulos
