= Charlie Cook (ice hockey) =

American ice hockey player (born 1982)

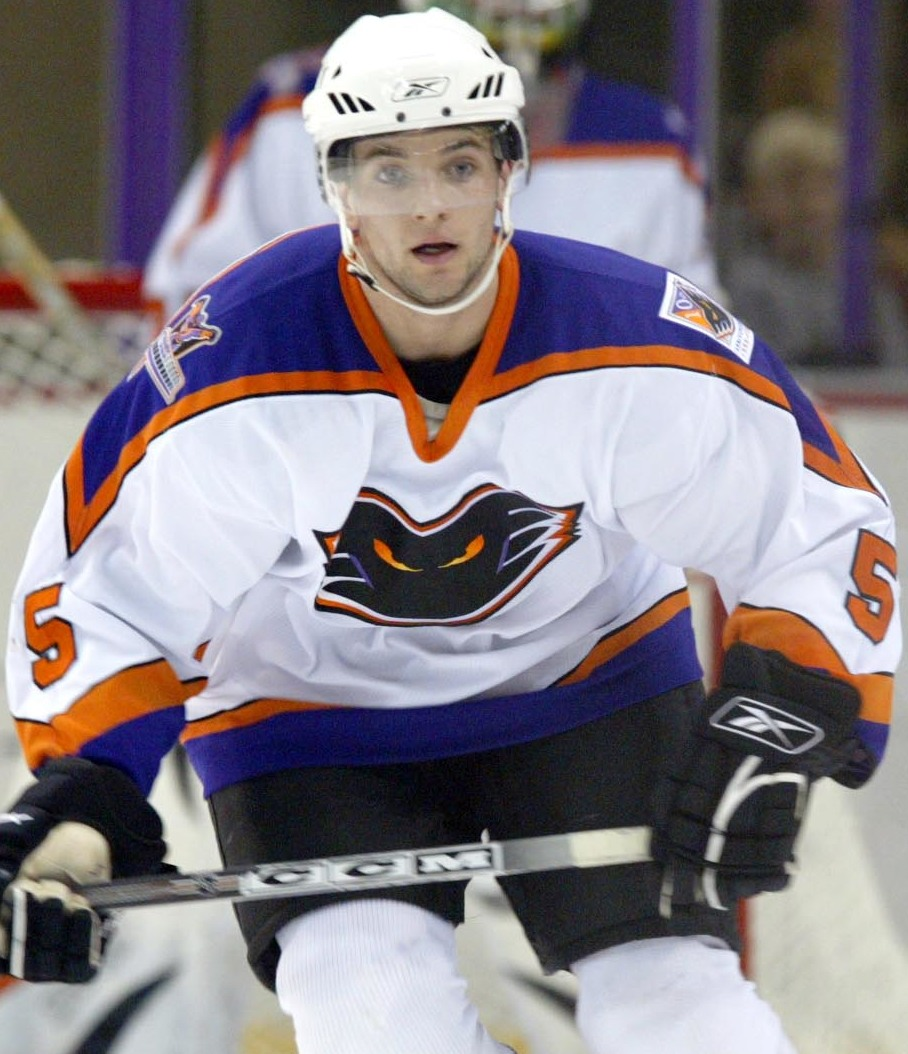
- Cook with the Philadelphia Phantoms in 2005
- Born: October 22, 1982 (age 43) Port Huron, Michigan, U.S.
- Height: 5 ft 11 in (180 cm)
- Weight: 187 lb (85 kg; 13 st 5 lb)
- Position: Defense
- Shot: Right
- Played for: Philadelphia Phantoms; Binghamton Senators; HIFK; HC Sparta Praha; Tappara; Lukko; Modo Hockey; HC Davos; SCL Tigers; Hamburg Freezers
- NHL draft: Undrafted
- Playing career: 2005–2016

Charlie Cook (born October 22, 1982) is an American former professional ice hockey defenseman who played in the American Hockey League, Finnish Liiga, Czech Extraliga, and Swedish Hockey League.

== Playing career ==
After playing four years at Cornell University, Cook signed an amateur tryout with the Philadelphia Phantoms of the American Hockey League (AHL). He made his professional debut during the Phantom's last regular-season game against the Norfolk Admirals. He played three games during the 2005 Calder Cup playoffs to help the Phantoms win the Calder Cup. On July 17, 2005, Cook re-signed a one-year deal with the Phantoms. On July 17, 2006, Cook signed a one-year contract with the Binghamton Senators of the AHL. On July 17, 2007, Cook joined the Finnish professional team HIFK of the Liiga. While playing for HIFK, Cook was selected to compete at the 2007 Deutschland Cup for Team USA. Cook played 38 games for HIFK collecting 15 points. However, due to the return of defenceman Libor Ustrnula, Cook became a surplus foreign player and left the club to join HC Sparta Praha in the Czech Extraliga league. His career with HC Sparta Praha was short-lived, however, as on June 27, 2008, Cook joined the Tappara of the Liiga on a one-year contract.

In December 2008, Cook joined Lukko of the Liiga, playing a total of 105 games and earning 45 points. After two seasons, Cooke signed a contract with Modo Hockey of the HockeyAllsvenskan for the 2010–11 season. After playing in 22 games, Cook signed with HC Davos of the National League to play in the Spengler Cup. On January 20, 2011, Cook joined the SCL Tigers.

On June 29, 2011, Cook left the SCL Tigers to sign with the German Hamburg Freezers of the Deutsche Eishockey Liga.

Due to the 2012–13 NHL lockout, Cook was forced out of his position with European teams due to a need to sign NHL players. As a result, Cook signed with the Las Vegas Wranglers of the ECHL for the 2012–13 season. After playing nearly six years in Europe, Cook made his North American debut on October 14. On August 20, 2013, Cook re-signed with the Las Vegas Wranglers.

After not playing during the 2014–15 season, Cook joined VIK Västerås HK of the HockeyAllsvenskan in Sweden.

In 2018, Cook was inducted into the Port Huron Sports Hall of Fame.

== Awards and honors ==
Award	Year
All-ECAC Hockey Second Team	2004–05
AHCA East Second-Team All-American	2004–05
ECAC Hockey All-Tournament Team	2005

Awards and achievements
Preceded by Brendan Bernakevitch	ECAC Hockey Most Outstanding Player in Tournament; 2005	Succeeded by John Dagineau
