= Mike Moore (ice hockey) =

Canadian ice hockey player

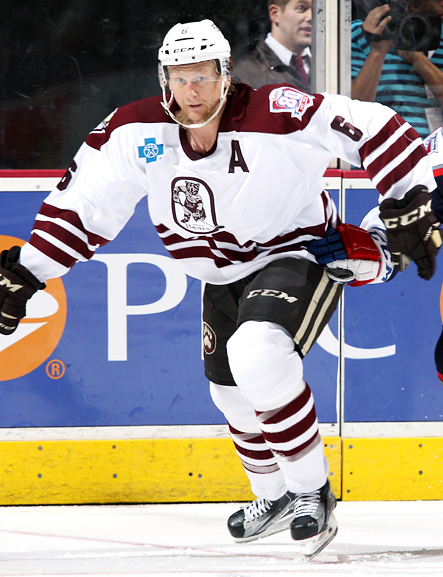
- Moore with the Hershey Bears in 2015
- Born: December 12, 1984 (age 41) Calgary, Alberta, Canada
- Height: 6 ft 1 in (185 cm)
- Weight: 200 lb (91 kg; 14 st 4 lb)
- Position: Defence
- Shoots: Left
- DEL team Former teams: Fischtown Pinguins; San Jose Sharks
- NHL draft: Undrafted
- Playing career: 2008–present

Michael Kenneth Moore (born December 12, 1984) is a Canadian professional ice hockey defenceman for the Fischtown Pinguins of the Deutsche Eishockey Liga (DEL).

== Playing career ==
Undrafted, Moore was signed by the San Jose Sharks to an entry-level contract. Moore scored his first NHL goal on November 17, 2010, against goaltender Peter Budaj of the Colorado Avalanche in just his second NHL game.

After spending his first four professional seasons within the Sharks organization, Moore left as a free agent to sign a one-year contract with the Nashville Predators on July 3, 2012.

On July 5, 2013, Moore was again a free agent and signed a one-year, two-way contract with the Boston Bruins. He was assigned to lead AHL affiliate, the Providence Bruins, for the duration of the 2013–14 season, posting 21 points in 75 games.

On July 1, 2014, Moore left the Bruins organization and signed as a free agent to a one-year, two-way contract with the Washington Capitals.

Moore spent the next two seasons within the Capitals organization with AHL affiliate, the Hershey Bears. After a run with the Bears to the Calder Cup Finals in the 2015–16 season, Moore left as a free agent to pursue a European career. On July 17, 2016, he agreed to a one-year deal with new DEL entrant, the Fischtown Pinguins.

== Career statistics ==
			Regular season					Playoffs
Season	Team	League	GP	G	A	Pts	PIM	GP	G	A	Pts	PIM
2003–04	Surrey Eagles	BCHL	52	6	21	27	148	10	0	2	2	6
2004–05	Princeton University	ECAC	25	3	7	10	22	—	—	—	—	—
2005–06	Princeton University	ECAC	30	0	4	4	42	—	—	—	—	—
2006–07	Princeton University	ECAC	32	4	10	14	50	—	—	—	—	—
2007–08	Princeton University	ECAC	34	7	17	24	40	—	—	—	—	—
2007–08	Worcester Sharks	AHL	3	0	0	0	16	—	—	—	—	—
2008–09	Worcester Sharks	AHL	76	5	13	18	132	12	0	1	1	17
2009–10	Worcester Sharks	AHL	64	3	19	22	82	11	0	0	0	14
2010–11	Worcester Sharks	AHL	49	2	10	12	50	—	—	—	—	—
2010–11	San Jose Sharks	NHL	6	1	0	1	7	—	—	—	—	—
2011–12	Worcester Sharks	AHL	61	4	16	20	85	—	—	—	—	—
2012–13	Milwaukee Admirals	AHL	50	5	11	16	42	4	1	0	1	2
2013–14	Providence Bruins	AHL	75	7	14	21	106	12	0	2	2	22
2014–15	Hershey Bears	AHL	41	3	11	14	47	9	0	1	1	10
2015–16	Hershey Bears	AHL	48	5	5	10	59	—	—	—	—	—
2016–17	Fischtown Pinguins	DEL	45	2	13	15	95	6	1	0	1	8
2017–18	Fischtown Pinguins	DEL	48	5	14	19	70	7	1	0	1	6
2018–19	Fischtown Pinguins	DEL	47	7	21	28	36	—	—	—	—	—
2019–20	Fischtown Pinguins	DEL	47	3	7	10	34	—	—	—	—	—
2020–21	Fischtown Pinguins	DEL	38	3	4	7	18	3	0	1	1	2
NHL totals			6	1	0	1	7	—	—	—	—	—

== Awards and honors ==
Award	Year
College
All-ECAC First Team	2007–08
AHCA East First-Team All-American	2007–08
ECAC All-Tournament Team	2008

Awards and achievements
Preceded by Drew Bagnall	ECAC Hockey Best Defensive Defenseman; 2007–08	Succeeded by Matt Generous
