= Matt Moulson =

Canadian ice hockey player (born 1983)

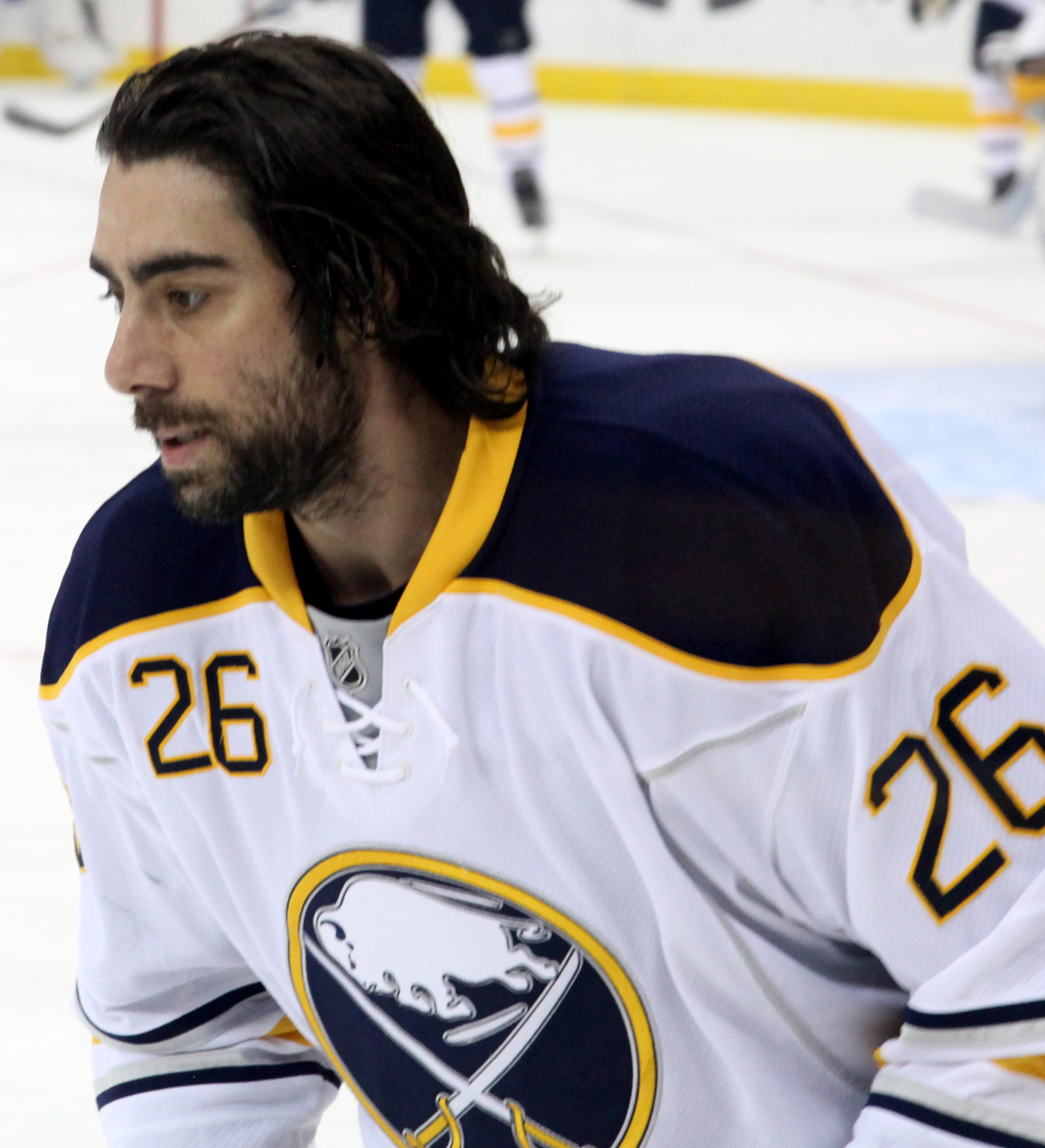
- Moulson with the Buffalo Sabres in 2016
- Born: November 1, 1983 (age 42) North York, Ontario, Canada
- Height: 6 ft 1 in (185 cm)
- Weight: 210 lb (95 kg; 15 st 0 lb)
- Position: Left wing
- Shot: Left
- Played for: Los Angeles Kings; New York Islanders; Buffalo Sabres; Minnesota Wild
- NHL draft: 263rd overall, 2003; Pittsburgh Penguins
- Playing career: 2006–2022

Matthew Keith Moulson (born November 1, 1983) is a Canadian former ice hockey left winger. Moulson played 650 games in the National Hockey League (NHL), the majority of which were spent with the New York Islanders and Buffalo Sabres.

== Playing career ==
=== Junior ===
Moulson grew up in Mississauga, Ontario, playing minor hockey for A Erindale, AA York Toros, AAA North York Canadiens, AAA Mississauga Senators, AAA Markham Islanders, AAA Mississauga Reps and at Midget for the AA Mississauga Braves of the Greater Toronto Hockey League (GTHL). He also attended Our Lady of Mount Carmel Secondary School in Mississauga, where he was a part of the school's hockey team.

After his midget career, Moulson signed with the Guelph Dominators Junior B club of the Midwestern Ontario Junior B League (OHA) for the 2000–01 and 2001–02 seasons. In the following four years, Moulson attended Cornell University to play for the Big Red ice hockey team of the ECAC Hockey conference.

Whilst playing for Cornell, Moulson was drafted 263rd overall by the Pittsburgh Penguins in the 2003 NHL entry draft. In 2006, he graduated from Cornell, where he served as team captain of the hockey team and was a member of the Quill and Dagger society in his senior year.

=== Professional ===
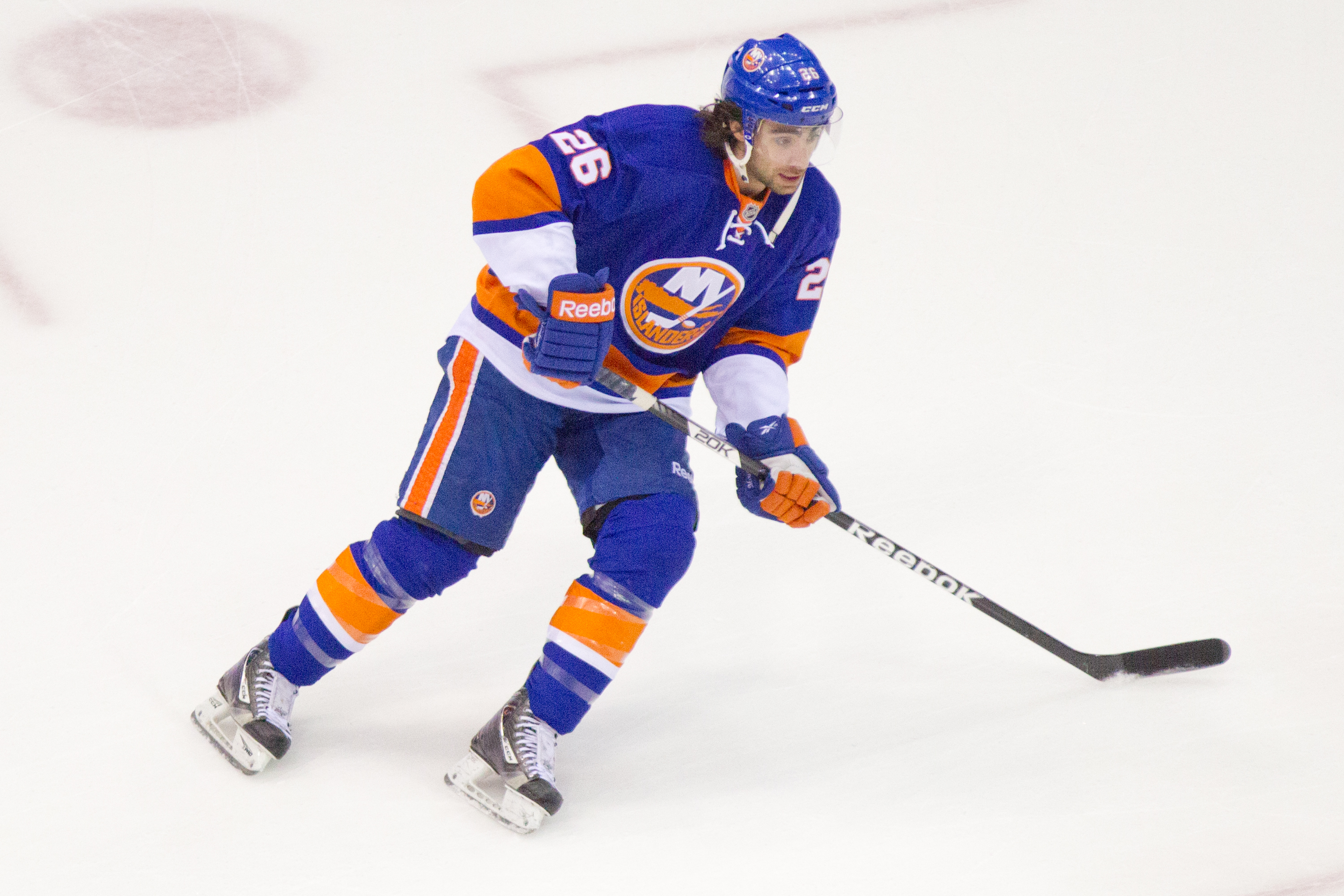
Moulson during his tenure with the Islanders.

Moulson signed with the Los Angeles Kings as a free agent on an entry-level contract on September 1, 2006. He was then assigned to the Kings' minor league affiliate, the Manchester Monarchs of the American Hockey League (AHL), for the 2006–07 season, where he registered 57 points in 77 games. He made his NHL debut in the 2007–08 season on November 2, 2007, against the San Jose Sharks. Moulson also scored his first career NHL goal in the 5–2 Kings victory.

On July 6, 2009, Moulson signed a one-year contract with the New York Islanders. He was a leading scorer in the NHL pre-season and made the team out of camp as a linemate of John Tavares. He scored his first NHL hat-trick — a natural hat trick — on December 3, 2009, against the Atlanta Thrashers.

On July 27, 2010, Moulson signed a one-year, $2.45 million contract extension with the Islanders just minutes before his arbitration hearing was scheduled to begin. On January 27, 2011, he then signed a three-year, $9.45 million contract extension with New York.

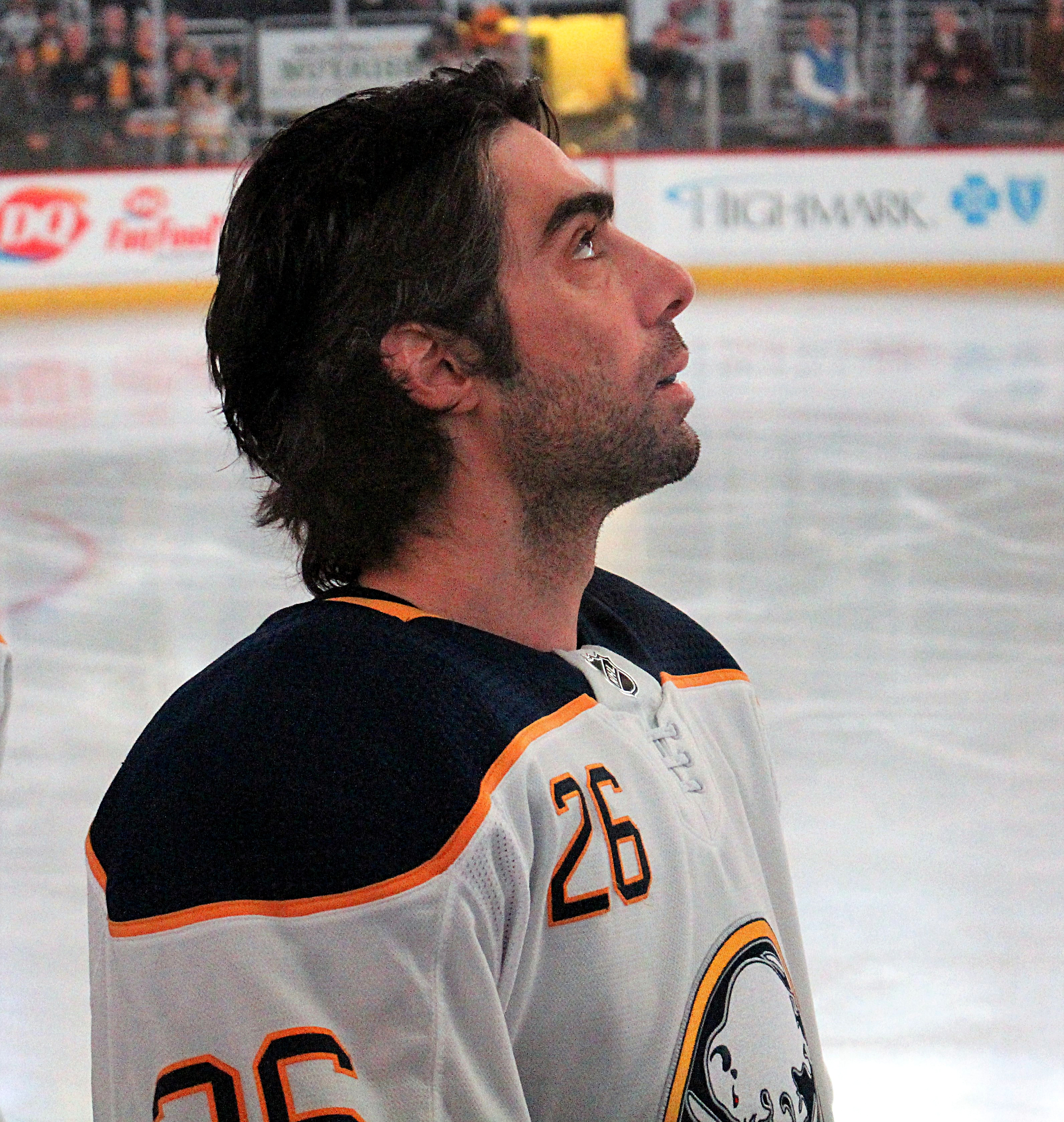
Moulson with the Sabres in 2017

After the 2011–12 season, Moulson became the first New York Islander since Žigmund Pálffy to post three consecutive 30-goal seasons. On May 16, 2013, Moulson was named a finalist, along with Patrick Kane and Martin St. Louis, for the Lady Byng Memorial Trophy, awarded annually to the player adjudged to have exhibited the best type of sportsmanship and gentlemanly conduct combined with a high standard of playing ability.

On October 27, 2013, Moulson and a 2015 first- and second-round draft pick were traded by the Islanders to the Buffalo Sabres in exchange for Thomas Vanek. Moulson scored two goals in his first game as a Sabre in a 4–3 losing effort to the Dallas Stars.

Moulson and Sabres forward Cody McCormick were then both traded to the Minnesota Wild on March 5, 2014, in exchange for Torrey Mitchell, a 2014 second-round pick (acquired from Winnipeg) and Minnesota's 2016 second-round pick (later traded to Montreal for Josh Gorges).

On July 1, 2014, Moulson returned to the Sabres, signing a five-year, $25 million contract.

After a difficult 2015–16 season that saw Moulson struggle under new Sabres coach Dan Bylsma and score a career-low 21 points (8 goals and 13 assists), he was rumored to be a buyout candidate. The Sabres ultimately decided to keep Moulson, and he eventually improved to 32 points (14 goals and 18 assists) in 2016–17.

Moulson was placed on waivers by the Sabres on December 4, 2017. He cleared waivers the following day and, with the Sabres unwilling to clear a roster spot on the Rochester Americans for him at the expense of their up-and-coming prospects, was lent to the Ontario Reign.

On July 24, 2019, Moulson signed a one-year contract with the Hershey Bears. He was recently selected as captain of the 2020 AHL All-Star Classic alongside Matthew Ford. The Hershey Bears later confirmed his retirement on July 11, 2022.

== Personal life ==
Moulson married Alicia Backman, who is the daughter of former NHL player Mike Backman, on July 3, 2010. Alicia's sister, Jaclyn, is married to former star NHL goaltender Jonathan Quick. Moulson's sister Shannon played her NCAA college ice hockey for the Niagara Purple Eagles women's ice hockey program and formerly competed in the Canadian Women's Hockey League for the Toronto Furies. Moulson's brother Chris played for two years at Cornell University, Matt's alma mater, and last played at Acadia University.

The couple have two children together, their first child, Mila Toni, was born on August 6, 2012, and the couple's second child, George Benjamin, was born on October 11, 2013. Former Islanders' teammate John Tavares is the godfather of Moulson's daughter, Mila and Kyle Okposo is the godfather of Moulson's son, George, who is also believed to be named after his wife's own godfather George McPhee, who is President of Hockey Operations for the Vegas Golden Knights.

Moulson is also a lacrosse player; in fact, he was drafted higher in the National Lacrosse League (NLL) than in the NHL, being selected in the fourth round, 37th overall, by the Rochester Knighthawks.

== Career statistics ==
| | | | Regular season | | | | | Playoffs |
| Season | Team | League | GP | G | A | Pts | PIM | GP | G | A | Pts | PIM |
|---|---|---|---|---|---|---|---|---|---|---|---|---|
| 1999–00 | Mississauga Braves AA | GTHL U18 | — | — | — | — | — | — | — | — | — | — |
| 2000–01 | Guelph Dominators | MWJHL | 43 | 31 | 24 | 55 | 63 | 5 | 7 | 5 | 12 | 18 |
| 2001–02 | Guelph Dominators | MWJHL | 42 | 56 | 46 | 102 | 80 | — | — | — | — | — |
| 2001–02 | Springfield Spirit | NAHL | 1 | 2 | 0 | 2 | 2 | — | — | — | — | — |
| 2002–03 | Cornell University | ECAC | 33 | 13 | 10 | 23 | 22 | — | — | — | — | — |
| 2003–04 | Cornell University | ECAC | 32 | 18 | 17 | 35 | 37 | — | — | — | — | — |
| 2004–05 | Cornell University | ECAC | 34 | 22 | 20 | 42 | 33 | — | — | — | — | — |
| 2005–06 | Cornell University | ECAC | 35 | 18 | 20 | 38 | 14 | — | — | — | — | — |
| 2006–07 | Manchester Monarchs | AHL | 77 | 25 | 32 | 57 | 23 | 16 | 2 | 3 | 5 | 8 |
| 2007–08 | Manchester Monarchs | AHL | 57 | 28 | 28 | 56 | 29 | 4 | 2 | 0 | 2 | 4 |
| 2007–08 | Los Angeles Kings | NHL | 22 | 5 | 4 | 9 | 4 | — | — | — | — | — |
| 2008–09 | Los Angeles Kings | NHL | 7 | 1 | 0 | 1 | 2 | — | — | — | — | — |
| 2008–09 | Manchester Monarchs | AHL | 54 | 21 | 26 | 47 | 35 | — | — | — | — | — |
| 2009–10 | New York Islanders | NHL | 82 | 30 | 18 | 48 | 16 | — | — | — | — | — |
| 2010–11 | New York Islanders | NHL | 82 | 31 | 22 | 53 | 24 | — | — | — | — | — |
| 2011–12 | New York Islanders | NHL | 82 | 36 | 33 | 69 | 6 | — | — | — | — | — |
| 2012–13 | New York Islanders | NHL | 47 | 15 | 29 | 44 | 4 | 6 | 2 | 1 | 3 | 10 |
| 2013–14 | New York Islanders | NHL | 11 | 6 | 3 | 9 | 6 | — | — | — | — | — |
| 2013–14 | Buffalo Sabres | NHL | 44 | 11 | 18 | 29 | 20 | — | — | — | — | — |
| 2013–14 | Minnesota Wild | NHL | 20 | 6 | 7 | 13 | 8 | 10 | 1 | 2 | 3 | 4 |
| 2014–15 | Buffalo Sabres | NHL | 77 | 13 | 28 | 41 | 4 | — | — | — | — | — |
| 2015–16 | Buffalo Sabres | NHL | 81 | 8 | 13 | 21 | 16 | — | — | — | — | — |
| 2016–17 | Buffalo Sabres | NHL | 81 | 14 | 18 | 32 | 10 | — | — | — | — | — |
| 2017–18 | Buffalo Sabres | NHL | 14 | 0 | 0 | 0 | 2 | — | — | — | — | — |
| 2017–18 | Ontario Reign | AHL | 49 | 18 | 28 | 46 | 16 | 4 | 1 | 1 | 2 | 2 |
| 2018–19 | Ontario Reign | AHL | 68 | 28 | 34 | 62 | 48 | — | — | — | — | — |
| 2019–20 | Hershey Bears | AHL | 62 | 22 | 19 | 41 | 24 | — | — | — | — | — |
| 2020–21 | Hershey Bears | AHL | 33 | 12 | 12 | 24 | 43 | — | — | — | — | — |
| 2021–22 | Hershey Bears | AHL | 24 | 5 | 12 | 17 | 10 | — | — | — | — | — |
| AHL totals | | | 424 | 159 | 191 | 350 | 228 | 24 | 5 | 4 | 9 | 12 |
| NHL totals | | | 650 | 176 | 193 | 369 | 122 | 16 | 3 | 3 | 6 | 14 |

== Awards and honours ==
| Award | Year |
|---|---|
College
| All-ECAC Hockey First Team | 2004–05 |
| AHCA East Second-Team All-American | 2004–05 |
| ECAC Hockey All-Tournament Team | 2005 |
| All-ECAC Hockey Second Team | 2005–06 |
