= Jean-Claude Sawyer =

Canadian ice hockey player

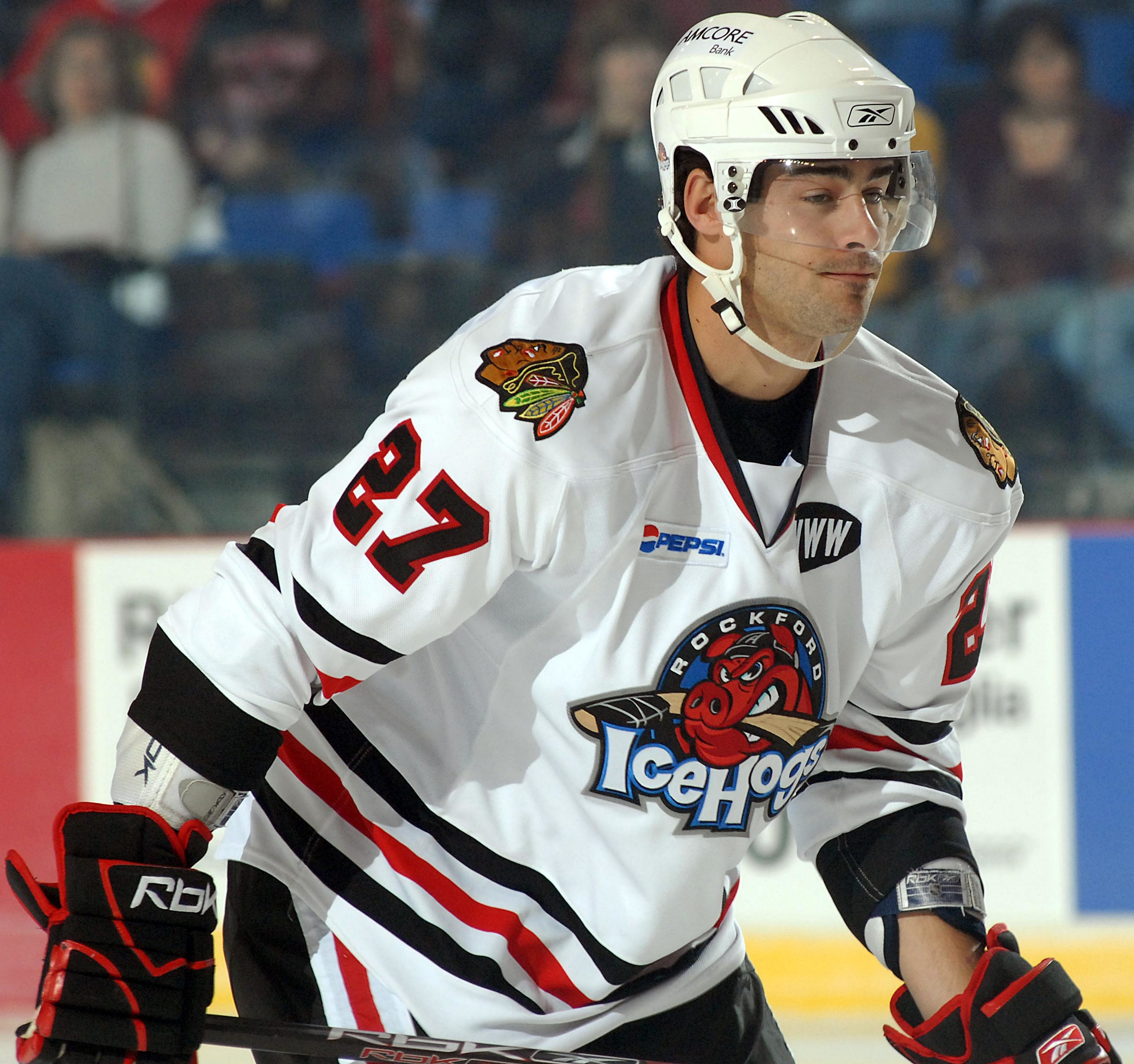
- Sawyer with the Rockford IceHogs in 2007
- Born: August 12, 1986 (age 39) Saint John, New Brunswick, Canada
- Height: 6 ft 3 in (191 cm)
- Weight: 194 lb (88 kg; 13 st 12 lb)
- Position: Defence
- Shot: Left
- Played for: Rockford IceHogs
- NHL draft: 161st overall, 2004; Minnesota Wild
- Playing career: 2007–2011

Jean-Claude Sawyer (born August 12, 1986) is a Canadian former professional ice hockey player who last played for the Cincinnati Cyclones in the ECHL. He was selected by the Minnesota Wild in the 5th round (161st overall) of the 2004 NHL entry draft.

On July 2, 2007, he was signed as a free agent by the Chicago Blackhawks.

== Awards and honours ==
- ECHL Defenseman of the Year (2009–10)
- ECHL First All-Star Team (2009–10)

== Career statistics ==
			Regular season					Playoffs
Season	Team	League	GP	G	A	Pts	PIM	GP	G	A	Pts	PIM
2002–03	Cape Breton Screaming Eagles	QMJHL	31	3	2	5	44	3	0	0	0	2
2003–04	Cape Breton Screaming Eagles	QMJHL	56	5	13	18	48	2	0	0	0	2
2004–05	Cape Breton Screaming Eagles	QMJHL	58	10	22	32	53	5	2	2	4	4
2005–06	Cape Breton Screaming Eagles	QMJHL	69	12	41	53	108	9	4	0	4	15
2006–07	Cape Breton Screaming Eagles	QMJHL	68	15	62	77	87	16	3	16	19	6
2007–08	Rockford IceHogs	AHL	4	0	0	0	4	—	—	—	—	—
2007–08	Pensacola Ice Pilots	ECHL	65	7	25	32	50	—	—	—	—	—
2008–09	Rockford IceHogs	AHL	19	3	1	4	19	—	—	—	—	—
2008–09	Fresno Falcons	ECHL	6	1	1	2	6	—	—	—	—	—
2008–09	Gwinnett Gladiators	ECHL	31	5	7	12	35	5	1	0	1	2
2009–10	Rockford IceHogs	AHL	4	0	1	1	2	—	—	—	—	—
2009–10	Toledo Walleye	ECHL	67	21	38	59	43	4	2	1	3	4
2010–11	Cincinnati Cyclones	ECHL	2	1	3	4	2	—	—	—	—	—
AHL totals			27	3	2	5	25	—	—	—	—	—
ECHL totals			171	35	84	119	136	9	3	1	4	6
