= David McKee (ice hockey) =

American ice hockey player (born 1983)

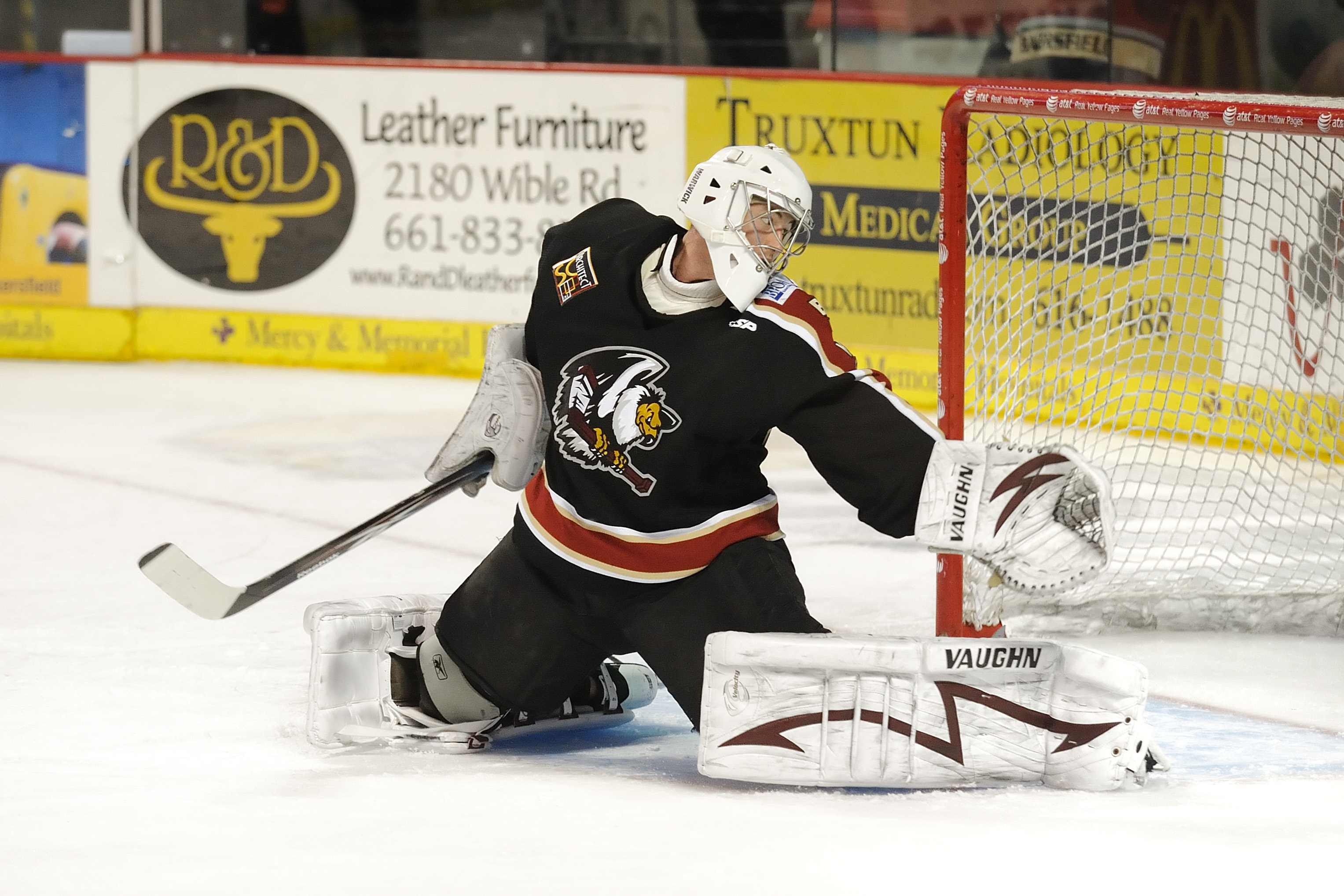
- McKee in 2009 with the Bakersfield Condors
- Born: December 5, 1983 (age 42) Midland, Texas, U.S.
- Height: 6 ft 1 in (185 cm)
- Weight: 180 lb (82 kg; 12 st 12 lb)
- Position: Goaltender
- Caught: Left
- CHL team Former teams: Quad City Mallards; AHL; Portland Pirates; Iowa Stars; ECHL; Augusta Lynx; Phoenix RoadRunners; Bakersfield Condors; CHL; Allen Americans; Odessa Jackalopes
- Playing career: 2003–2012

David McKee (born December 5, 1983) is an American professional hockey goaltender. He most recently played with the Quad City Mallards of the Central Hockey League during the 2011–12 season. McKee was formerly a star college goaltender at Cornell University.

== Early life ==
McKee was born in Midland, Texas. He started for three years at Cornell University. During his record-breaking college career, he had a career record of 65–24–13 with a .926 SV%, 1.71 GAA and 18 shutouts. During the 2003–04 season, he had a shutout streak of 159:27 from December 5 to December 28. Even though his rookie year was astounding, nothing could compare to the end of the 2004–05 season, where over his final 21 games, he allowed just 20 goals while posting a 0.93 goals against average and a .962 save percentage to go along with an 18–2–1 record to help lead his team to win the ECAC title. He led the Cornell Big Red to a season record 19-game unbeaten streak. During that season, McKee also recorded a record-breaking 10 shutouts.

== Career ==
On April 1, 2006, the Mighty Ducks of Anaheim announced that they signed him with a two-year entry-level contract. Mighty Ducks executive vice president and general manager Brian Burke said, "Over the past two seasons, David McKee has proven to be one of the premier players at the collegiate level. He is a great addition to the core of young talented players within our organization.”

McKee began the season playing for the Augusta Lynx, the ECHL affiliate of the Anaheim Ducks. He was briefly assigned to the Portland Pirates of the AHL, but was sent down to get playing experience. He quickly became starting goaltender for the Lynx, picking up his first professional win came on October 21, 2006, against the Gwinnett Gladiators. He topped the ECHL standings, with the most shootout wins (3), the second-most wins (8), the fourth-most saves (355), and was fifth in minutes played (651).

McKee was called up to the NHL several times during his first professional season. His first stint began on November 21, 2006, as the backup for Jean-Sébastien Giguère while Ilya Bryzgalov was unavailable due to a lower-body injury. He was dressed for three games, until Giguère sustained an injury and was scratched against the Calgary Flames on November 26. McKee backed up Mike Wall, who was called up from Portland on the same day. After his fourth game, McKee rejoined the Lynx. McKee also played in the 2006 Men's World Ice Hockey Championships.

== Awards and honors ==
Award	Year
All-ECAC Hockey Rookie Team	2003–04
All-ECAC Hockey First Team	2004–05
AHCA East First-Team All-American	2004–05
ECAC Hockey All-Tournament Team	2005

- 2003-04: ECAC Co-Rookie of the Year
- 2003-04: Cornell Big Red Most Promising Freshman
- 2004-05: Cornell Big Red Most Valuable Player
- 2004-05: ECAC and Ivy League Player of the Year
- 2004-05: ECAC and Ivy League Goalie of the Year
- 2004-05: NCAA Hobey Hat Trick Finalist
- 2006-07: Augusta Lynx Most Valuable Player
- 2006-07: Augusta Lynx Rookie of the Year
- 2006-07: Portland Pirates Player of the Week

== Records ==
- Cornell Big Red franchise record for most consecutive career starts: 102
- Cornell Big Red franchise record for most shutouts in a single season: (2004–05) - 10
- ECAC league record for most shutouts in a single season: (2004–05) - 10
- NCAA All-Time Individual NCAA Tournament Save Percentage record min. 200 minutes: (2005–06) - .955%
- Augusta Lynx franchise record for most wins in a season: (2006–07) - 29

== Career statistics ==
Season	Team	League	GP	W	L	T	MIN	GA	SO	GAA	SV%
2003–04	Cornell Big Red	ECAC	32	16	10	6	1929	59	5	1.84	.920
2004–05	Cornell Big Red	ECAC	35	27	5	3	2125	44	10	1.24	.947
2005–06	Cornell Big Red	ECAC	35	22	9	4	2139	74	3	2.08	.910
Cornell totals			102	65	24	13	6193	177	18	1.71	.926

Awards and achievements
Preceded by Hugh Jessiman	ECAC Hockey Rookie of the Year; 2003–04 (With Brian Ihnacak)	Succeeded by Joe Fallon
Preceded by Yann Danis	ECAC Hockey Player of the Year; 2004–05	Succeeded by T. J. Trevelyan
Preceded by Yann Danis	Ken Dryden Award; 2004–05	Succeeded by Mark DeKanich
