= Jon Pelle =

American ice hockey player

- Born: March 29, 1986 (age 40) West Islip, NY, USA
- Height: 5 ft 8 in (173 cm)
- Weight: 168 lb (76 kg; 12 st 0 lb)
- Position: Forward
- Shot: Right
- Played for: Frederikshavn White Hawks (Denmark); Rapid City Rush (CHL); Cardiff Devils (EIHL); Belfast Giants (EIHL)
- NHL draft: Undrafted
- Playing career: 2008–2012

Jon Pelle (born March 29, 1986) is a retired American professional ice hockey player.

After four seasons in Harvard University, Pelle signed with the Frederikshavn White Hawks in Denmark in 2008 and finished that season with the Central Hockey League's Rapid City Rush, re-signing with them for the 2009-10 season. He then moved to the United Kingdom in 2010 with the Cardiff Devils and in 2011 he signed with the Belfast Giants.

== Awards and honors ==
Award	Year
ECAC Hockey All-Tournament Team	2008
EIHL First All-Star team	2010–11
