= Ethan Cox =

Canadian professional ice hockey player

- Born: July 25, 1987 (age 38) Richmond, British Columbia, Canada
- Height: 5 ft 10 in (178 cm)
- Weight: 174 lb (79 kg; 12 st 6 lb)
- Position: Right wing
- Shoots: Left
- ECHL team Former teams: Reading Royals; Portland Pirates; Peoria Rivermen; Bridgeport Sound Tigers
- NHL draft: Undrafted
- Playing career: 2010–present

Ethan Cox (born July 25, 1987) is a Canadian professional ice hockey player. He is currently playing with the Reading Royals of the ECHL.

Cox played attended Colgate University and played four seasons of college hockey with the Colgate Raiders men's ice hockey where he scored 17 goals and 24 assists for 41 points, and earned 70 penalty minutes in 150 games played.
