= Raymond Sawada =

Canadian ice hockey player (1985–2023)

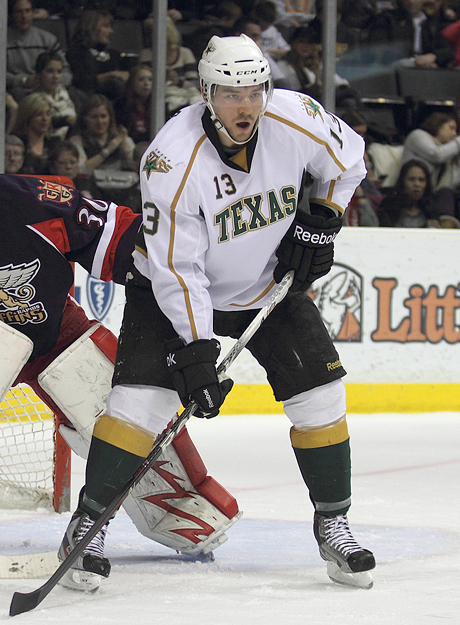
- Sawada with the Texas Stars in 2012
- Born: February 19, 1985 Richmond, British Columbia, Canada
- Died: April 10, 2023 (aged 38) Richmond, British Columbia, Canada
- Height: 6 ft 2 in (188 cm)
- Weight: 205 lb (93 kg; 14 st 9 lb)
- Position: Right wing
- Shot: Right
- Played for: Dallas Stars; Tappara; Belfast Giants; Oji Eagles
- NHL draft: 52nd overall, 2004; Dallas Stars
- Playing career: 2008–2016

Raymond Masao Sawada (February 19, 1985 – April 10, 2023) was a Canadian professional ice hockey winger. The Dallas Stars of the National Hockey League (NHL) selected him in the second round of the 2004 NHL entry draft, and he played 11 games with them between 2008 and 2011. Sawada spent most of his career, which lasted from 2008 to 2016, in the American Hockey League, with subsequent stints in the ECHL, SM-Liiga, Elite Ice Hockey League, and Asia League Ice Hockey. After he retired from the sport he become a firefighter. Sawada died in 2023 after suffering a heart attack during a recreational hockey game.

== Early life ==
Sawada was born on February 19, 1985, in Richmond, British Columbia, to Jack and Regina Sawada. He played minor ice hockey for the Richmond Sockeyes of the Pacific International Junior Hockey League, winning a championship with the team in 2003. After that, he was offered a role with the Nanaimo Clippers of the British Columbia Hockey League, scoring 52 points in 54 games during the 2003–04 season.

== Playing career ==
The Dallas Stars of the National Hockey League (NHL) selected Sawada in the second round, 52nd overall, of the 2004 NHL entry draft. He spent the next four years playing for the Cornell Big Red men's ice hockey team, serving as co-captain during his final season. Sawada played 137 games with Cornell, during which he scored 31 goals and 76 points. On March 28, 2008, the Stars signed Sawada to a two-year entry-level contract.

Sawada made his NHL debut on February 19, 2009, his 24th birthday, scoring a goal in Dallas's 4–2 victory over the Edmonton Oilers. Between 2008 and 2011, Sawada played 11 NHL games, recording one goal. He also played 287 American Hockey League (AHL) games for the Iowa Stars, Manitoba Moose, Texas Stars and St. John's IceCaps.

Sawada began the 2013–14 professional ice hockey season with the Colorado Eagles of the ECHL, waiting for another NHL contract. When one failed to materialize, he left the Eagles after 15 points in 18 games to join Tappara in SM-Liiga. There, Sawada recorded three goals and eight points in 29 regular season games. After winning a silver medal with Tappara, Sawada signed a one-year contract with the Belfast Giants of the Elite Ice Hockey League for the 2014–15 season. Sawada played his final season of professional ice hockey with the Oji Eagles of Asia League Ice Hockey in 2015–16, recording 13 goals and 34 points in 33 games.

== Personal life ==
Sawada was of Italian and Japanese descent. After retiring from professional ice hockey in 2016, Sawada became a firefighter in Burnaby, British Columbia, and he lived in Richmond with his wife Nicole and their two daughters.

On April 10, 2023, Sawada suffered a fatal cardiac arrest while playing recreational ice hockey in Richmond. He was 38.

== Career statistics ==
=== Regular season and playoffs ===
			Regular season					Playoffs
Season	Team	League	GP	G	A	Pts	PIM	GP	G	A	Pts	PIM
2001–02	Richmond Sockeyes	PIJHL	3	1	0	1	6	—	—	—	—	—
2002–03	Richmond Sockeyes	PIJHL	36	7	17	24	155	—	—	—	—	—
2003–04	Nanaimo Clippers	BCHL	54	20	32	52	93	25	6	16	22	22
2004–05	Cornell University	ECAC	35	4	5	9	48	—	—	—	—	—
2005–06	Cornell University	ECAC	35	7	13	20	20	—	—	—	—	—
2006–07	Cornell University	ECAC	31	10	11	21	29	—	—	—	—	—
2007–08	Cornell University	ECAC	36	10	16	26	34	—	—	—	—	—
2007–08	Iowa Stars	AHL	10	2	7	9	14	—	—	—	—	—
2008–09	Dallas Stars	NHL	5	1	0	1	0	—	—	—	—	—
2008–09	Manitoba Moose	AHL	52	6	15	21	31	22	4	4	8	4
2009–10	Dallas Stars	NHL	5	0	0	0	0	—	—	—	—	—
2009–10	Texas Stars	AHL	60	8	11	19	92	24	3	5	8	20
2010–11	Texas Stars	AHL	57	11	18	29	91	6	1	5	6	2
2010–11	Dallas Stars	NHL	1	0	0	0	0	—	—	—	—	—
2011–12	Texas Stars	AHL	26	6	10	16	19	—	—	—	—	—
2011–12	St. John's IceCaps	AHL	17	1	2	3	14	15	3	3	6	10
2012–13	St. John's IceCaps	AHL	65	13	16	29	88	—	—	—	—	—
2013–14	Colorado Eagles	ECHL	18	7	8	15	26	—	—	—	—	—
2013–14	Tappara	FIN	29	3	5	8	10	1	0	0	0	2
2014–15	Belfast Giants	EIHL	52	21	38	59	89	4	2	2	4	2
2015–16	Oji Eagles	ALH	33	13	21	34	58	2	2	0	2	2
AHL totals			287	47	79	126	349	67	11	17	28	36
NHL totals			11	1	0	1	0	—	—	—	—	—
