= Max Kolu =

Finnish ice hockey player

- Born: July 7, 1983 (age 42) Turku, FIN
- Height: 6 ft 0 in (183 cm)
- Weight: 205 lb (93 kg; 14 st 9 lb)
- Position: Defence/Left wing
- Shot: Left
- SM-liiga team Former teams: TPS; NCAA; Clarkson University
- Playing career: 2007–2011

Max Kolu (born July 7, 1983, in Turku, Finland) is a Finnish professional ice hockey player. He is currently playing for TPS Turku of the SM-liiga.

== Playing career ==
Kolu started his professional career playing college hockey in 2003–04. There he played for Clarkson University. After three seasons, he returned to Finland to play for SM-liiga team TPS. Kolu is a hard hitter, and is especially known for his good work rate. In TPS, he has become one of the biggest fan favourites.

== Career statistics ==
| | | | Regular season | | | | | Playoffs |
| Season | Team | League | GP | G | A | Pts | PIM | GP | G | A | Pts | PIM |
|---|---|---|---|---|---|---|---|---|---|---|---|---|
| 2003–2004 | Clarkson University | NCAA | 39 | 2 | 7 | 9 | 24 | - | - | - | - | - |
| 2004–2005 | Clarkson University | NCAA | 37 | 1 | 2 | 3 | 20 | - | - | - | - | - |
| 2005–2006 | Clarkson University | NCAA | 37 | 4 | 0 | 4 | 34 | - | - | - | - | - |
| 2006–2007 | Clarkson University | NCAA | 38 | 1 | 6 | 7 | 28 | - | - | - | - | - |
| 2007–2008 | TPS | SM-liiga | 56 | 2 | 6 | 8 | 48 | 2 | 1 | 0 | 1 | 2 |
| 2008–2009 | TPS | SM-liiga | 58 | 6 | 5 | 11 | 32 | 8 | 1 | 1 | 2 | 6 |
