= Jeff Prough =

American ice hockey player (born 1986)

- Born: April 20, 1986 (age 39) Farmington Hills, Michigan, U.S.
- Height: 5 ft 10 in (178 cm)
- Weight: 170 lb (77 kg; 12 st 2 lb)
- Position: Forward
- Shot: Right
- Played for: Florida Everblades; Gwinnett Gladiators; Lowell Devils; Albany Devils; Connecticut Whale; Greenville Road Warriors
- NHL draft: Undrafted
- Playing career: 2008–2012

Jeff Prough (born April 20, 1986) is an American former professional ice hockey player.

== Awards and honors ==
Award	Year
All-ECAC Hockey Second Team	2006–07

- Played in the 2010 ECHL All-Star Game
