= 2007 ECAC Hockey men's ice hockey tournament =

2007 ECAC Men's ice hockey tournament
- Dates: March 2–17, 2007
- Teams: 12
- Finals site: Times Union Center; Albany, New York
- Champions: Clarkson (5th title)
- Winning coach: George Roll (1st title)
- MVP: Chris D'Alvise (Clarkson)
- ECAC Men's Ice Hockey Tournaments

The 2007 ECAC Hockey Men's Ice Hockey Tournament was the 46th tournament in league history. It was played between March 2 and March 17, 2007. First Round and Quarterfinal games were played at home team campus sites, while the final four games were played at the Times Union Center in Albany, New York. By winning the tournament, Clarkson received the ECAC Hockey automatic bid to the 2007 NCAA Division I Men's Ice Hockey Tournament.

== Format ==
The tournament featured four rounds of play. The teams that finish above fifth place in the standings receive a bye to the quarterfinal round. In the first round, the fifth and twelfth seeds, the sixth and eleventh seeds, the seventh and tenth seeds and the eighth and ninth seeds played a best-of-three series with the winners advancing to the quarterfinals. In the quarterfinals the one seed plays the lowest remaining seed, the second seed plays the second-lowest remaining seed, the third seed plays the third-lowest remaining seed and the fourth seed plays the fourth-lowest remaining seed another best-of-three series with the winners of these the series advancing to the Semifinals. In the semifinals the top remaining seed plays the lowest remaining seed while the two remaining teams play against each other. The winners of the semifinals play in the championship game while the losers play in a third-place game. All series after the quarterfinals are single-elimination games. The tournament champion receives an automatic bid to the 2007 NCAA Men's Division I Ice Hockey Tournament.

== Conference standings ==
Note: GP = Games played; W = Wins; L = Losses; T = Ties; PTS = Points; GF = Goals For; GA = Goals Against

2006–07 ECAC Hockey standings
	Conference							Overall					
	GP	W	L	T	PTS	GF	GA	GP	W	L	T	GF	GA
#14 St. Lawrence†	22	16	5	1	33	73	55	39	23	14	2	122	104
#7 Clarkson*	22	13	4	4	30	74	53	39	25	9	5	136	93
Dartmouth	22	12	7	3	27	69	60	33	18	12	3	105	93
Cornell	22	10	8	4	24	64	55	31	14	13	4	90	78
Quinnipiac	22	10	8	4	24	74	63	40	21	14	5	140	106
Harvard	22	10	10	2	22	67	65	33	14	17	2	88	90
Princeton	22	10	10	2	22	69	63	34	15	16	3	102	100
Colgate	22	7	12	3	17	53	60	40	15	21	4	100	105
Rensselaer	22	6	11	5	17	55	84	36	10	18	8	88	130
Yale	22	8	13	1	17	56	72	31	11	17	3	78	98
Brown	22	6	12	4	16	65	69	32	11	15	6	96	95
Union	22	7	14	1	15	54	74	36	14	19	3	103	119
Championship: Clarkson † indicates conference regular season champion (Cleary Cup) * indicates conference tournament champion (Whitelaw Cup); Final rankings: USA Today/USA Hockey Magazine Top 15 Poll

== Bracket ==
Teams are reseeded after the First Round and Quarterfinals

First Round; March 2–4
5	Quinnipiac	3	5*	–
12	Union	1	4	–
6	Princeton	3	2*	4
11	Brown	4*	1	3
7	Harvard	5	2	–
10	Yale	2	1	–
8	Colgate	3	4	–
9	Rensselaer	1	1	–

Quarterfinals; March 9–10
1	St. Lawrence	6	5	–
8	Colgate	1	1	–
2	Clarkson	3	2	–
7	Harvard	0	1	–
3	Dartmouth	6	3	–
6	Princeton	2	2	–
4	Cornell	0	2	–
5	Quinnipiac	1*	3	–

Semifinals; March 16
1	St. Lawrence	0
5	Quinnipiac	4
2	Clarkson	5
3	Dartmouth	4

Championship; March 17
5	Quinnipiac	2
2	Clarkson	4
Third Place
1	St. Lawrence	5
3	Dartmouth	3

Note: * denotes overtime period(s)

=== First round ===
==== (5) Quinnipiac vs. (12) Union ====
March 2	Quinnipiac	3 – 1	Union	TD Banknorth Center	Recap
(Cashman, Sorteberg) Ben Nelson - PP - 19:36		First period	No scoring
(Marshall) Eric Lampe - GW - 19:44		Second period	No scoring
(Bates, Henningson) Bryan Leitch - PP - 04:48		Third period	17:18 - EA PP - Olivier Bouchard (Fox, Schreiber)
( 25 saves / 26 shots ) Bud Fisher		Goalie stats	Justin Mrazek ( 30 saves / 33 shots )

March 3	Quinnipiac	5 – 4	OT	Union	TD Banknorth Center	Recap
No Scoring		First period		17:34 - Lane Caffaro (Bouchard, Coyle)
(Holt, Bates) Reid Cashman - PP - 05:00 (Cashman, Bates) Matt Sorteberg - PP - 14:04		Second period		No scoring
(Cashman, Marshall) Chris Myers - 02:43 (Beaudoin, Holt) Brandon Wong - 07:26		Third period		01:05 - PP - Chris Potts (Walters, Schreiber); 10:16 - PP - Josh Coyle (Bouchard, Fox); 16:23 - Torren Delforte (Fox, Beynon)
(Leitch, Cashman) Jamie Bates - GW PP - 01:20		First overtime period		No scoring
( 18 saves / 22 shots ) Bud Fisher		Goalie stats		Justin Mrazek ( 27 saves / 32 shots )

Quinnipiac won series 2–0

==== (6) Princeton vs. (11) Brown ====
March 2	Princeton	3 – 4	OT	Brown	Hobey Baker Rink	Recap
No Scoring		First period		01:22 - PP - Ryan Garbutt (Poli, Ihnacak)
(Goeckner-Zoeller, Cousins) Brett Wilson - PP - 06:43 (Westgarth, Stankievech) Kyle Hagel - 08:16		Second period		10:34 - PP - Brian McNary (Prough, Hurley)
(Stankievech, Magnowski) Daryl Marcoux - 16:53		Third period		16:53 - PP - Ryan Garbutt (Ihnacak, Russell)
No scoring		First overtime period		01:24 - GW - Sean Muncy (Ihnacak, Dersch)
( 23 saves / 27 shots ) Zane Kalemba		Goalie stats		Dan Rosen ( 36 saves / 39 shots )

March 3	Princeton	2 – 1	OT	Brown	Hobey Baker Rink	Recap
No Scoring		First period		No scoring
(Jubinville, Westgarth) Cam MacIntyre - PP - 13:31		Second period		15:38 - Devin Timberlake (Poli, Palmer)
No scoring		Third period		No scoring
(Jubinville, Powe) Brett Wilson - GW - 01:50		First overtime period		No scoring
( 21 saves / 22 shots ) B.J. Sklapsky		Goalie stats		Dan Rosen ( 33 saves / 35 shots )

March 4	Princeton	4 – 3	Brown	Hobey Baker Rink	Recap
(Bartlett, Shattenkirk) Daryl Marcoux - 18:24		First period	No scoring
(Wilson, Powe) Lee Jubinville - 06:29		Second period	06:06 - Aaron Volpatti (Poli, Timberlake); 09:46 - Aaron Volpatti (Palmer, Poli); 14:39 - PP - Matt Vokes (Hurley, Russell)
(Goeckner-Zoeller, Wilson) Kevin Westgarth - PP - 01:31 (Magnowski, Marcoux) Grant Goeckner-Zoeller - GW - 07:22		Third period	No scoring
( 32 saves / 35 shots ) B.J. Sklapsky		Goalie stats	Dan Rosen ( 27 saves / 31 shots )

Princeton won series 2–1

==== (7) Harvard vs. (10) Yale ====
March 2	Harvard	5 – 2	Yale	Bright Hockey Center	Recap
No Scoring		First period	07:26 - PP - Chris Cahill (Mills, Boucher); 18:16 - Robert Page
(Fraser, Du) Dylan Reese - PP - 06:41 (Du, Pelle) Dylan Reese - PP - 14:05		Second period	No scoring
(Rogers, Fraser) Dylan Reese - GW PP - 01:16 (McCafferty, Biega) Doug Rogers - PP - 05:34 (Maki, MacDonald) Alex Meintel - 13:03		Third period	No scoring
( 16 saves / 18 shots ) Justin Tobe		Goalie stats	Alec Richards ( 23 saves / 27 shots )

March 3	Harvard	2 – 1	Yale	Bright Hockey Center	Recap
(McCafferty, Taylor) Jimmy Fraser - 18:43		First period	12:34 - PP - Brad Mills (Boucher, Cahill)
(Morin, Christian) Steve Rolecek - GW - 17:15		Second period	No scoring
No scoring		Third period	No scoring
( 28 saves / 29 shots ) Justin Tobe		Goalie stats	Matt Modelski ( 22 saves / 24 shots ))

Harvard won series 2–0

==== (8) Colgate vs. (9) Rensselaer ====
March 2	Colgate	3 – 1	Rensselaer	Starr Rink	Recap
(Fulton, St. Pierre) Tom Riley - PP - 02:06 (Burton, Bogdanich) Jesse Winchester - GW PP - 16:03		First period	No scoring
No scoring		Second period	00:25 - PP - Oren Eizenman (Uryadov, Luthi)
(Burton) David McIntyre - 07:18		Third period	No scoring
( 16 saves / 17 shots ) Mark Dekanich		Goalie stats	Mathias Lange ( 16 saves / 19 shots )

March 3	Colgate	4 – 1	Rensselaer	Starr Rink	Recap
(Fulton, Fredricks) Jason Williams - PP - 04:34		First period	13:13 - Jonathan Ornelas (MacDonald, Morissette)
(Dekanich) Tom Riley - GW - 07:00		Second period	No scoring
Jesse Winchester - PS - 14:12 (Williams, Fulton) Tom Riley - 15:50		Third period	No scoring
( 25 saves / 26 shots ) Mark Dekanich / ( 1 saves / 1 shots ) Justin Kowalkoski		Goalie stats	Jordan Alford ( 30 saves / 34 shots )

Colgate won series 2–0

=== Quarterfinals ===
==== (1) St. Lawrence vs. (8) Colgate ====
March 9	St. Lawrence	6 – 1	Colgate	Appleton Arena	Recap
(Taylor, McBride) Casey Parenteau - PP - 03:41 (Rank, Bagnall) Mike McKenzie - GW - 11:10 (Vermeulen, Curran) Casey Parenteau - 13:04		First period	01:37 - Jason Williams (Fulton)
(Taylor, McBride) Kevin DeVergilio - 00:47 (Parenteau, Bagnall) Mike McKenzie - PP - 12:06 (Rank, McKenzie) Casey Parenteau - PP - 12:49		Second period	No scoring
No scoring		Third period	No scoring
( 26 saves / 28 shots ) Alex Petizian		Goalie stats	Charles Long ( 9 saves / 13 shots ) / Justin Kowalkoski ( 13 saves / 15 shots )

March 10	St. Lawrence	5 – 1	Colgate	Appleton Arena	Recap
Andrzej Sandrzyk - SH - 10:48 (McBride, Taylor) Jared Ross - GW - 14:38 (DeVergilio, Miskovic) Max Taylor - PP - 18:01		First period	No scoring
(Curran) Kevin DeVergilio - 17:34 (Taylor, DeVergilio) Shawn Fensel - 19:41		Second period	12:35 - Jason Fredricks (Fulton, Winchester)
No scoring		Third period	No scoring
( 22 saves / 23 shots ) Alex Petizian		Goalie stats	Justin Kowalkoski ( 31 saves / 36 shots )

St. Lawrence won series 2–0

==== (2) Clarkson vs. (7) Harvard ====
March 9	Clarkson	3 – 0	Harvard	Cheel Arena	Recap
No Scoring		First period	No scoring
(Kolu) Brodie Rutherglen - GW - 10:25		Second period	No scoring
(Weller, Cayer) Nick Dodge - PP - 14:09 (Dodge) Shawn Weller - EN - 19:32		Third period	No scoring
( 27 saves / 27 shots ) David Leggio		Goalie stats	Justin Tobe ( 18 saves / 20 shots )

March 10	Clarkson	2 – 1	Harvard	Cheel Arena	Recap
(Weller, Cayer) Grant Clitsome - PP - 13:51		First period	No scoring
No scoring		Second period	14:12 - PP - Mike Taylor (Maki, Rogers)
(Cayer) Mike Sullivan - GW - 16:19		Third period	No scoring
( 37 saves / 38 shots ) David Leggio		Goalie stats	Justin Tobe ( 27 saves / 29 shots )

Clarkson won series 2–0

==== (3) Dartmouth vs. (6) Princeton ====
March 9	Dartmouth	6 – 2	Princeton	Thompson Arena	Recap
(Shields, Swallow) J. T. Wyman - PP - 11:54		First period	No scoring
(Swallow, Wyman) TJ Galiardi - 00:35 (Lewis, Galiardi) J. T. Wyman - GW - 04:27 (Glass, Johnson) David Jones - 07:29 (Swallow, Shields) Ben Lovejoy - PP - 10:31		Second period	14:57 - Jofy Pederson (Kaiser, Shattenkirk); 18:57 - PP - Darroll Powe (Westgarth, Marcoux)
(Wyman, Devine) Rob Pritchard - EN SH - 15:33		Third period	No scoring
( 23 saves / 27 shots ) Mike Devine		Goalie stats	Zane Kalemba ( 13 saves / 18 shots ) / Thomas Sychterz ( 8 saves / 8 shots )

March 10	Dartmouth	3 – 2	Princeton	Thompson Arena	Recap
(Glass, Johnson) David Jones - 06:38		First period	No scoring
No scoring		Second period	07:22 - Lee Jubinville (Westgarth, Westgarth)
(Lewis, Glass) David Jones - SH - 11:49 (Swallow, Galiardi) J. T. Wyman - GW - 13:15		Third period	13:49 - Mark Magnowski (Goeckner-Zoeller, MacIntyre)
( 27 saves / 29 shots ) Mike Devine		Goalie stats	B.J. Sklapsky ( 29 saves / 32 shots )

Dartmouth won series 2–0

==== (4) Cornell vs. (5) Quinnipiac ====
March 9	Cornell	0 – 1	OT	Quinnipiac	Lynah Rink	Recap
No Scoring		First period		No scoring
No scoring		Second period		No scoring
No scoring		Third period		No scoring
No scoring		First overtime period		02:08 - GW - Dan Lefort (Lampe)
( 23 saves / 24 shots ) Troy Davenport		Goalie stats		Bud Fisher ( 23 saves / 23 shots )

March 10	Cornell	2 – 3	Quinnipiac	Lynah Rink	Recap
(Nash, McCutcheon) Evan Barlow - 14:34 (Gallagher, Nash) Colin Greening - PP - 16:56		First period	00:23 - David Marshall (Lampe)
No scoring		Second period	16:12 - Brandon Wong (Holt, Cashman)
No scoring		Third period	15:39 - GW PP - Ben Nelson (Cashman)
( 24 saves / 27 shots ) Troy Davenport		Goalie stats	Bud Fisher ( 19 saves / 21 shots )

Quinnipiac won series 2–0

=== Semifinals ===
==== (1) St. Lawrence vs. (5) Quinnipiac ====
March 16	St. Lawrence	0 – 4	Quinnipiac	Times Union Center	Recap
No Scoring		First period	05:10 - GW - Ben Nelson (Leitch, Duncan)
No scoring		Second period	06:52 - PP - Brandon Wong (Cashman, Marshall); 19:25 - David Marshall
No scoring		Third period	15:55 - GW - Ben Nelson (Leitch)
( 24 saves / 28 shots ) Alex Petizian		Goalie stats	Bud Fisher ( 23 saves / 23 shots )

==== (2) Clarkson vs. (3) Dartmouth ====
March 16	Clarkson	5 – 4	Dartmouth	Times Union Center	Recap
(Dodge, Cayer) Shawn Weller - PP - 08:28		First period	No scoring
(Sullivan, Clitsome) Nick Dodge - 09:26 (Tuttle, Kolu) Mike Willemsen - 15:59		Second period	08:48 - Rob Pritchard (Shribman, Grecu)
(Guthrie, Marks) Chris D'Alvise - 05:05 (Weller, Grenzy) Steve Zalewski - GW - 19:19		Third period	03:38 - Grant Lewis (Swallow, Lovejoy); 06:16 - PP - TJ Galiardi (Jones); 18:20 - J. T. Wyman (Swallow, Galiardi)
( 25 saves / 29 shots ) David Leggio		Goalie stats	Mike Devine ( 24 saves / 29 shots )

=== Third place ===
==== (1) St. Lawrence vs. (3) Dartmouth ====
March 17	St. Lawrence	5 – 3	Dartmouth	Times Union Center	Recap
No Scoring		First period	19:36 - Nick Johnson (Jones)
(Generous, Keller) Kevin DeVergilio - EA - 06:47 (Bagnall, Rank) Mike McKenzie - 07:33 (Wallmann, Griffin) Jeremiah Cunningham - 12:20		Second period	02:05 - PP - TJ Galiardi (Johnson); 02:05 - J. T. Wyman (Galiardi, Lovejoy)
(Bagnall, Sandrzyk) Mike McKenzie - GW - 11:27 (Curran) Max Taylor - EN - 19:52		Third period	No scoring
( 24 saves / 27 shots ) Alex Petizian		Goalie stats	Mike Devine ( 37 saves / 41 shots )

=== Championship ===
==== (2) Clarkson vs. (5) Quinnipiac ====
March 17	Clarkson	4 – 2	Quinnipiac	Times Union Center	Recap
No Scoring		First period	00:32 - Jean-Marc Beaudoin; 19:54 - Bryan Leitch (Bates, Nelson)
No scoring		Second period	No scoring
(Guthrie) Chris D'Alvise - 01:43 (Zalewski, Weller) Philippe Paquet - 12:30 (D'Alvise, Guthrie) Brodie Rutherglen - GW - 13:20 (D'Alvise) Shawn Weller - EN - 19:04		Third period	No scoring
( 23 saves / 25 shots ) David Leggio		Goalie stats	Bud Fisher ( 26 saves / 29 shots )

== Tournament awards ==
=== All-Tournament Team ===
- F Shawn Weller (Clarkson)
- F Chris D'Alvise* (Clarkson)
- F Ben Nelson (Quinnipiac)
- D Drew Bagnall (St. Lawrence)
- D Reid Cashman (Quinnipiac)
- G Bud Fisher (Quinnipiac)

* Most Outstanding Player(s)
