= 2010 ECAC Hockey men's ice hockey tournament =

2010 ECAC Men's ice hockey tournament
- 2010 ECAC Hockey Men's Ice Hockey Tournament logo
- Dates: March 5–20, 2010
- Teams: 12
- Finals site: Times Union Center; Albany, New York
- Champions: Cornell (12th title)
- Winning coach: Mike Schafer (5th title)
- MVP: Ben Scrivens (Cornell)
- ECAC Men's Ice Hockey Tournaments

The 2010 ECAC Hockey Men's Ice Hockey Tournament was the 49th tournament in league history. It was played between March 5 and March 20, 2010. First Round and Quarterfinal games were played at home team campus sites, while the final four games were played at the Times Union Center in Albany, New York. By winning the tournament, Cornell received the ECAC Hockey automatic bid to the 2010 NCAA Division I Men's Ice Hockey Tournament.

In the Quarterfinals series between Union and Quinnipiac the first match became the longest game played in NCAA history when the winning goal was scored in the 151st minute of play (the fifth overtime).

== Format ==
The tournament features four rounds of play. In the first round, the fifth and twelfth, sixth and eleventh, seventh and tenth, and eighth and ninth seeds as determined by the final regular season standings play a best-of-three series, with the winner advancing to the quarterfinals. There, the first seed and lowest ranked first round winner, the second seed and second lowest ranked first round winner, the third seed and second highest ranked first round winner, and the fourth seed and highest ranked first round winner play a best-of-three series, with the winner advancing to the semifinals. In the semifinals, the highest and lowest seeds and second highest and second lowest seeds play a single-game, with the winner advancing to the championship game and the loser advancing to the third place game. The tournament champion receives an automatic bid to the 2010 NCAA Men's Division I Ice Hockey Tournament.

=== Regular season standings ===
Note: GP = Games played; W = Wins; L = Losses; T = Ties; PTS = Points; GF = Goals For; GA = Goals Against

2009–10 ECAC Hockey standings
	Conference							Overall					
	GP	W	L	T	PTS	GF	GA	GP	W	L	T	GF	GA
#6 Yale†	22	15	5	2	32	92	72	34	21	10	3	141	105
#9 Cornell*	22	14	5	3	31	74	43	34	21	9	4	107	67
Union	22	12	6	4	28	81	60	39	21	12	6	134	100
Colgate	22	12	8	2	26	78	70	36	15	15	6	118	119
St. Lawrence	22	9	8	5	23	62	61	42	19	16	7	118	121
Rensselaer	22	10	9	3	23	64	58	39	18	17	4	109	108
Quinnipiac	22	11	11	0	22	71	63	40	20	18	2	123	114
Princeton	22	8	12	2	18	65	76	31	12	16	3	91	103
Harvard	22	7	12	3	17	61	70	33	9	21	3	82	113
Dartmouth	22	7	12	3	17	69	79	32	10	19	3	96	115
Brown	22	6	12	4	16	64	95	37	13	20	4	103	134
Clarkson	22	4	15	3	11	50	84	37	9	24	4	92	136
Championship: Cornell † indicates conference regular season champion (Cleary Cup) * indicates conference tournament champion (Whitelaw Cup); Final rankings: USA Today/USA Hockey Magazine Top 15 Poll

== Bracket ==
Teams are reseeded after the First Round and Quarterfinals

First round March 5–7
5	St. Lawrence	3*	3	3
12	Clarkson	2	4*	2
6	Rensselaer	1	4	2
11	Brown	3	1	3
7	Quinnipiac	3	3	2
10	Dartmouth	2	6	1
8	Princeton	2	0	—
9	Harvard	4	3	—

Quarterfinals; March 12–14
1	Yale	2	6	0
11	Brown	3	3	1
2	Cornell	5	3	—
9	Harvard	1	0	—
3	Union	2	3	2
7	Quinnipiac	3*****	1	1
4	Colgate	1	3	—
5	St. Lawrence	2	4	—

Semifinals; March 19
2	Cornell	3
11	Brown	0
3	Union	3
5	St. Lawrence	1

Championship; March 20
2	Cornell	3
3	Union	0
Third place
5	St. Lawrence	0
11	Brown	3

Note: * denotes overtime period(s)

=== First round ===
==== (5) St. Lawrence vs. (12) Clarkson ====
March 5	St. Lawrence	3 – 2	OT	Clarkson	Appleton Arena
(Flanagan, Bogosian) Brandon Bollig - 00:40		First period		16:48 - Brandon DeFazio (Oakley, Freeman)
(Hughes, Vermeulen) Alex Curran - PP - 08:18		Second period		No scoring
No scoring		Third period		06:37 - PP - Mark Borowiecki (Beca, Rufenach)
(Hughes, Keller) Aaron Bogosian - GW - 10:09		First overtime period		No scoring
( 21 saves / 23 shots ) Alex Petizian		Goalie stats		Paul Karpowich ( 47 saves / 50 shots )

March 6	St. Lawrence	3 – 4	OT	Clarkson	Appleton Arena
No Scoring		First period		05:19 - PP - Mark Borowiecki (Tamblyn, Beca)
(Flanagan, Caister) Aaron Bogosian - 03:25 (Klancher, Armstrong) Jacob Drewiske - 04:50		Second period		No scoring
(Vermeulen) Mike McKenzie - 12:47		Third period		08:21 - Matt Beca (Tremblay); 16:28 - Nick Tremblay (Borowiecki, Tamblyn)
No scoring		First overtime period		06:48 - GW - Jake Morley (DeFazio, Himelson)
( 24 saves / 28 shots ) Alex Petizian		Goalie stats		Paul Karpowich ( 31 saves / 34 shots )

March 7	St. Lawrence	3 – 2	Clarkson	Appleton Arena
(Bogosian, Flanagan) Jeff Caister - PP - 06:04		First period	No scoring
No scoring		Second period	11:57 - Tim Marks (Rufenach); 19:47 - PP - Brandon DeFazio (Freeman, Himelson)
(McKenzie, Keller) Rick Carden - 14:47 (Vermeulen, Caister) Mike McKenzie - GW - 18:37		Third period	No scoring
( 23 saves / 25 shots ) Kain Tisi		Goalie stats	Paul Karpowich ( 30 saves / 33 shots )

St. Lawrence won series 2–1

==== (6) Rensselaer vs. (11) Brown ====
March 5	Rensselaer	1 – 3	Brown	Houston Field House	Recap
(Bergin, Polacek) Paul Kerins - PP - 07:57		First period	No scoring
No scoring		Second period	No scoring
No scoring		Third period	01:40 - Jarred Smith (Brownschidle, Fratkin); 02:53 - GW - Bobby Farnham (Timberlake, Volpatti); 18:55 - EN - Aaron Volpatti (Timberlake, Farnham)
( 25 saves / 27 shots ) Allen York		Goalie stats	Mike Clemente ( 24 saves / 25 shots )

March 6	Rensselaer	4 – 1	Brown	Houston Field House	Recap
(D'Amigo, Pirri) Paul Kerins - PP - 07:01		First period	15:05 - Aaron Volpatti (Zolnierczyk, McMonagle)
(Merth) Patrick Cullen - GW - 14:41 (unassisted) Brandon Pirri - 15:56		Second period	No scoring
(D'Amigo, Kerins) Chase Polacek - PP - 10:09		Third period	No scoring
( 23 saves / 24 shots ) Allen York		Goalie stats	Mike Clemente ( 30 saves / 34 shots )

March 7	Rensselaer	2 – 3	Brown	Houston Field House	Recap
No Scoring		First period	07:05 - Aaron Volpatti (Farnham, Timberlake)
No scoring		Second period	12:24 - Jack MacLellan (Buvinow, Volpatti)
(Cullen, Brutlag) Paul Kerins - 05:49 (Burgdoerfer, Cullen) Jeff Foss - EA - 16:55		Third period	00:18 - GW - Chris Zaires (Zolnierczyk)
( 22 saves / 25 shots ) Allen York		Goalie stats	Mike Clemente ( 28 saves / 30 shots )

Brown won series 2–1

==== (7) Quinnipiac vs. (10) Dartmouth ====
March 5	Quinnipiac	3 – 2	Dartmouth	TD Banknorth Sports Center	Recap
No Scoring		First period	No scoring
(Hansen, Beaudoin) Brandon Wong - PP - 05:12		Second period	01:23 - Dustin Walsh (Jones, Walsh)
(Beaudoin, Zurevinski) Eric Lampe - 05:31 (Wong, Lampe) Jean-Marc Beaudoin - GW PP - 09:33		Third period	18:41 - Scott Fleming (Estoclet, Reber)
( 23 saves / 25 shots ) Dan Clarke		Goalie stats	James Mello ( 17 saves / 20 shots )

March 6	Quinnipiac	3 – 6	Dartmouth	TD Banknorth Sports Center	Recap
No Scoring		First period	02:50 - Paul Lee (Goodship)
(Arnt, Oakes) Bobby Tyson - 18:44		Second period	02:11 - Doug Jones (Fleming, Reber); 05:42 - Adam Estoclet (Jones, Fleming); 16:27 - GW - Matt Reber (Estoclet, Fleming)
(Ketchum) D'Arcy Oakes - 04:23 (Holt, Davies) Jean-Marc Beaudoin - PP - 18:17		Third period	10:02 - Scott Fleming (Reber, Stephens); 11:57 - Matt Reber (Fleming)
( 29 saves / 35 shots ) Dan Clarke		Goalie stats	James Mello ( 28 saves / 31 shots )

March 7	Quinnipiac	2 – 1	Dartmouth	TD Banknorth Sports Center	Recap
(unassisted) Eric Lampe - 16:36		First period	No scoring
(Goodman, Arnt) Ben Ketchum - 01:57		Second period	No scoring
No scoring		Third period	13:57 - Joe Stejskal (Fleming, Reber)
( 26 saves / 27 shots ) Dan Clarke		Goalie stats	James Mello ( 7 saves / 8 shots ) / Jody O'Neill ( 20 saves / 21 shots )

Quinnipiac won series 2–1

==== (8) Princeton vs. (9) Harvard ====
March 5	Princeton	2 – 4	Harvard	Hobey Baker Memorial Rink	Recap
(Godlewski, Bartlett) Marc Hagel - 15:27		First period	No scoring
(Pederson, Kramer) Mark Magnowski - 15:27		Second period	No scoring
No scoring		Third period	08:05 - Daniel Moriarty (Michaud, Morrison); 10:35 - Danny Biega (Grenier, Huxley); 14:05 - GW - Michael Del Mauro (Christian, Grimshaw); 17:50 - Danny Biega (Leblanc, Biega)
( 31 saves / 35 shots ) Zane Kalemba		Goalie stats	Kyle Richter ( 33 saves / 35 shots )

March 6	Princeton	0 – 3	Harvard	Hobey Baker Memorial Rink	Recap
No Scoring		First period	No scoring
No scoring		Second period	No scoring
No scoring		Third period	07:11 - GW PP - Daniel Moriarty (Leblanc, Biega); 14:23 - Danny Biega (Del Mauro, Grenier); 18:45 - EN - Luke Grenier (Biega, Del Mauro)
( 14 saves / 16 shots ) Zane Kalemba		Goalie stats	Kyle Richter ( 37 saves / 37 shots )

Harvard won series 2–0

=== Quarterfinals ===
==== (1) Yale vs. (11) Brown ====
March 12	Yale	2 – 3	Brown	Ingalls Rink	Recap
No Scoring		First period	No scoring
No scoring		Second period	00:07 - Jeff Buvinow (MacLellan); 01:04 - Aaron Volpatti (Buvinow, Farnham)
(O'Neill, Miller) Thomas Dignard - PP - 06:18 (Dignard, Arcobello) Denny Kearney - EA - 19:22		Third period	06:18 - GW - Bobby Farnham (Volpatti, Crowley)
( 28 saves / 31 shots ) Billy Blase		Goalie stats	Mike Clemente ( 37 saves / 39 shots )

March 13	Yale	6 – 3	Brown	Ingalls Rink	Recap
(Dignard, Kearney) Broc Little - 00:26 (Kearney) Jimmy Martin - PP - 06:11		First period	No scoring
(Kearney) Kevin Limbert - 01:31 (Miller, Little) Brian O'Neill - GW - 10:28		Second period	No scoring
(Miller, Dignard) Brian O'Neill - PP - 04:08 (unassisted) Andrew Miller - 18:19		Third period	02:58 - SH - Jack MacLellan (Zolnierczyk); 13:52 - PP - Aaron Volpatti (Buvinow, MacLellan); 19:11 - Scott Van der Linden (Ryan)
( 22 saves / 25 shots ) Billy Blase		Goalie stats	Mike Clemente ( 20 saves / 24 shots ) / Dan Rosen ( 17 saves / 19 shots )

March 14	Yale	0 – 1	Brown	Ingalls Rink	Recap
No Scoring		First period	01:14 - GW SH - Jack MacLellan (unassisted)
No scoring		Second period	No scoring
No scoring		Third period	No scoring
( 20 saves / 21 shots ) Billy Blase		Goalie stats	Mike Clemente ( 44 saves / 44 shots )

Brown won series 2–1

==== (2) Cornell vs. (9) Harvard ====
March 12	Cornell	5 – 1	Harvard	Lynah Rink
(Nash, D'Agostino) Colin Greening - 04:35 (Devin, Kennedy) Nick D'Agostino - GW PP - 12:41		First period	09:30 - PP - Pier-Olivier Michaud (Morrison, Biega)
(Roeszler, Gallagher) Nick D'Agostino - 12:27		Second period	No scoring
(unassisted) Riley Nash - 05:44 (Greening, Jillson) Riley Nash - 10:01		Third period	No scoring
( 26 saves / 27 shots ) Ben Scrivens		Goalie stats	Kyle Richter ( 21 saves / 26 shots ) / Ryan Carroll ( 3 saves / 3 shots )

March 13	Cornell	3 – 0	Harvard	Lynah Rink
No Scoring		First period	No scoring
(Whitney, Nash) Blake Gallagher - GW PP - 12:05		Second period	No scoring
(Greening, Kennedy) Sean Collins - 14:27 (Nash, Gallagher) Colin Greening - EN PP - 19:26		Third period	No scoring
( 17 saves / 17 shots ) Ben Scrivens		Goalie stats	Kyle Richter ( 29 saves / 31 shots )

Cornell won series 2–0

==== (3) Union vs. (7) Quinnipiac ====
March 12	Union	2 – 3	5OT	Quinnipiac	Achilles Center	Recap
(unassisted) Stephane Boileau - 07:13 (Walters, Zajac) Mario Valery-Trabucco - PP - 09:42		First period		13:01 - Scott Zurevinski (Lampe)
No scoring		Second period		01:12 - PP - Jeremy Langlois (Holt, Davies)
No scoring		Third period		No scoring
No scoring		Fifth overtime period		10:22 - GW - Greg Holt (Wong, Oakes)
( 52 saves / 55 shots ) Keith Kinkaid		Goalie stats		Dan Clarke ( 73 saves / 75 shots )

March 13	Union	3 – 1	Quinnipiac	Achilles Center	Recap
(Valery-Trabucco, Zajac) Adam Presizniuk - PP - 05:01 (Pallos, Julseth-White) Luke Cain - GW - 18:27		First period	17:15 - PP - Brandon Wong (Holt, Davies)
No scoring		Second period	No scoring
(Julseth-White) Adam Presizniuk - 01:17		Third period	No scoring
( 27 saves / 28 shots ) Corey Milan		Goalie stats	Dan Clarke ( 29 saves / 32 shots )

March 14	Union	2 – 1	Quinnipiac	Achilles Center	Recap
(Schreiber) Wayne Simpson - 02:01		First period	No scoring
No scoring		Second period	No scoring
(Cain, Zajac) Jeremy Welsh - GW - 01:04		Third period	15:31 - Reese Rolheiser (Langlois, Currie)
( 30 saves / 31 shots ) Corey Milan		Goalie stats	Dan Clarke ( 33 saves / 35 shots )

Union won series 2–1

==== (4) Colgate vs. (5) St. Lawrence ====
March 12	Colgate	1 – 2	St. Lawrence	Starr Rink
No Scoring		First period	17:07 - Aaron Bogosian (Hughes, Child)
(Day, Poplawski) Austin Smith - 15:35		Second period	No scoring
No scoring		Third period	15:21 - GW PP - Mike McKenzie (Curran, Vermeulen)
( 29 saves / 31 shots ) Alex Evin		Goalie stats	Kain Tisi ( 31 saves / 32 shots )

March 13	Colgate	3 – 4	St. Lawrence	Starr Rink
(McIntyre, Poplawski) Jeremy Price - PP - 16:08		First period	No scoring
(McIntyre) Jeremy Price - PP - 02:30		Second period	10:20 - PP - Mike McKenzie (Hughes, Child)
(Larkin, McNamara) Brian Day - PP - 10:56		Third period	01:21 - Nick Pitsikoulis (Bogosian); 14:23 - Jacob Drewiske (Keller, Armstrong); 18:53 - GW - Matt Raley (Flanagan, Carden)
( 25 saves / 29 shots ) Alex Evin		Goalie stats	Kain Tisi ( 33 saves / 36 shots )

St. Lawrence won series 2–0

=== Semifinals ===
==== (2) Cornell vs. (11) Brown ====
March 19	Cornell	3 – 0	Brown	Times Union Center	Recap
No Scoring		First period	No scoring
(Esposito) Locke Jillson - GW - 15:35		Second period	No scoring
(Krueger) John Esposito - 06:40 (Greening) Riley Nash - 13:40		Third period	No scoring
( 23 saves / 23 shots ) Ben Scrivens		Goalie stats	Mike Clemente ( 24 saves / 27 shots )

==== (3) Union vs. (5) St. Lawrence ====
March 19	Union	3 – 1	St. Lawrence	Times Union Center	Recap
(Boileau, Simpson) Luke Cain - 10:25		First period	No scoring
No scoring		Second period	19:35 - Derek Keller (Caister)
(Walters, Boileau) Adam Preszniuk - GW - 09:26 (Julseth-White) Mario Valery-Trabucco - EN - 19:55		Third period	No scoring
( 29 saves / 30 shots ) Keith Kinkaid		Goalie stats	Kain Tisi ( 16 saves / 18 shots )

=== Third place ===
==== (5) St. Lawrence vs. (8) Brown ====
March 20	St. Lawrence	0 – 3	Brown	Times Union Center	Recap
No Scoring		First period	No scoring
No scoring		Second period	14:34 - GW - Aaron Volpatti (Zaires, Rosen)
No scoring		Third period	04:05 - Jesse Fratkin (Zolnierczyk, Zaires); 16:52 - EN - Harry Zolnierczyk (Pietrus, McMonagle)
( 34 saves / 36 shots ) Alex Petizian		Goalie stats	Dan Rosen ( 21 saves / 21 shots )

=== Championship ===
==== (2) Cornell vs. (3) Union ====
March 20	Cornell	3 – 0	Union	Times Union Center	Recap
(Roeszler, Devin) Joe Devin - GW PP - 15:09		First period	No scoring
(Nash, Nash) Sean Whitney - PP - 17:25		Second period	No scoring
(unassisted) Patrick Kennedy - EN - 19:43		Third period	No scoring
( 32 saves / 32 shots ) Ben Scrivens		Goalie stats	Keith Kinkaid ( 31 saves / 33 shots )

== Tournament awards ==
=== All-Tournament Team ===
- F Colin Greening (Cornell)
- F Riley Nash (Cornell)
- F Adam Presiznuk (Union)
- D Justin Krueger (Cornell)
- D Mike Schreiber (Union)
- G Ben Scrivens* (Cornell)

* Most Outstanding Player(s)
