= Riley Nash =

Canadian ice hockey player (born 1989)

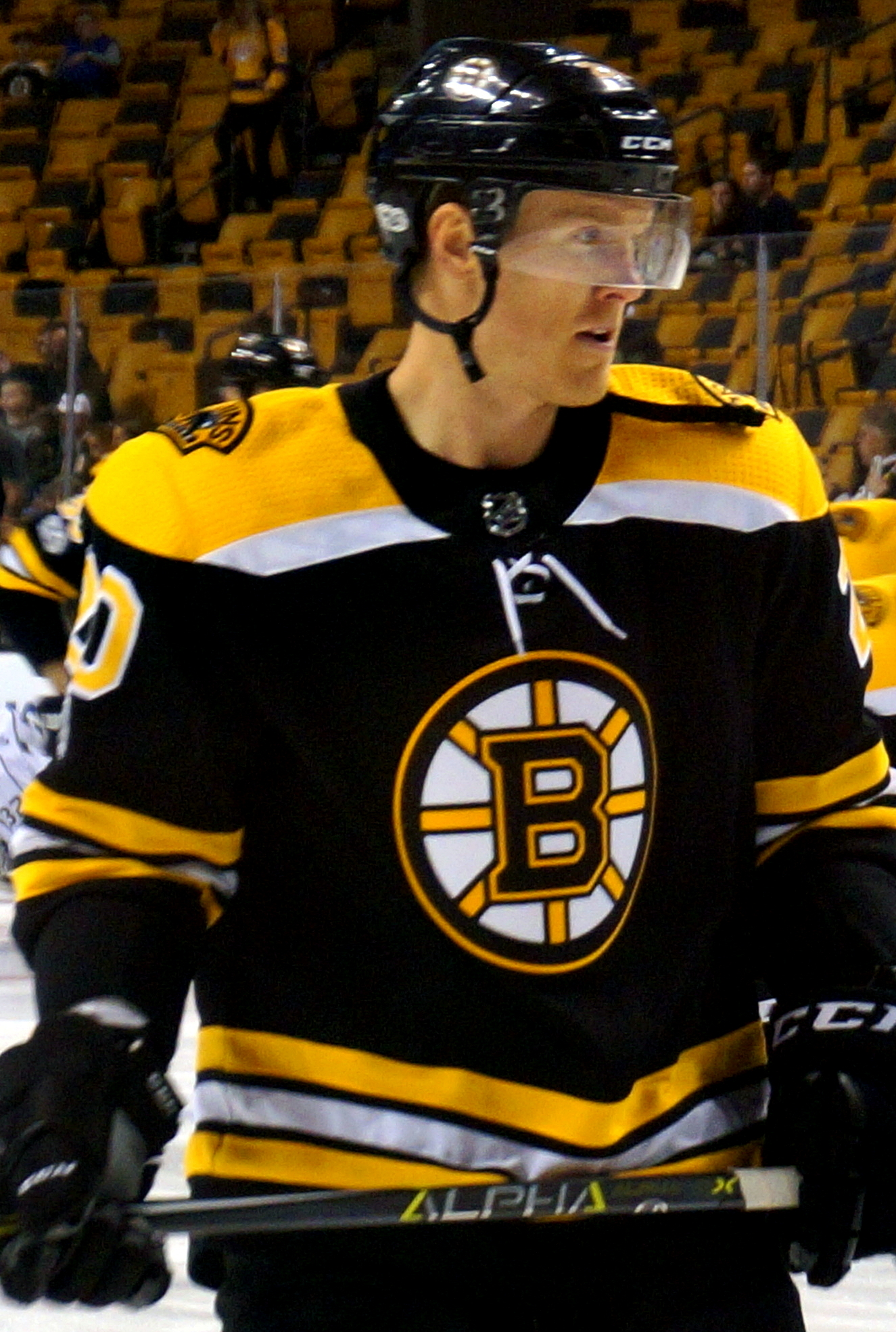
- Nash with the Boston Bruins in 2017
- Born: May 9, 1989 (age 37) Consort, Alberta, Canada
- Height: 6 ft 1 in (185 cm)
- Weight: 173 lb (78 kg; 12 st 5 lb)
- Position: Forward
- Shot: Right
- Played for: Carolina Hurricanes; Boston Bruins; Columbus Blue Jackets; Toronto Maple Leafs; Winnipeg Jets; Tampa Bay Lightning; Arizona Coyotes; New York Rangers
- NHL draft: 21st overall, 2007; Edmonton Oilers
- Playing career: 2010–2024

Riley Nash (born May 9, 1989) is a Canadian former professional ice hockey forward. He was originally selected by the Edmonton Oilers in the first round, 21st overall, of the 2007 NHL entry draft and has played in the National Hockey League (NHL) for the Carolina Hurricanes, Boston Bruins, Columbus Blue Jackets, Toronto Maple Leafs, Winnipeg Jets, Tampa Bay Lightning, Arizona Coyotes, and the New York Rangers.

== Early life ==
Nash was born on May 9, 1989, in Consort, Alberta, but raised in Kamloops, British Columbia. Riley's brother, Brendon Nash, played for the Montreal Canadiens and the Hartford Wolf Pack in the American Hockey League (AHL). Their older sister Jenna is a mortgage specialist. His cousin through his mother's side, Kelly Olynyk, is a professional basketball player for the Toronto Raptors of the National Basketball Association.

They are of no relation to Rick Nash, although Riley and Rick both played for the Boston Bruins during the 2017–18 season.

== Playing career ==
=== Amateur ===
In his first full Junior A season in the British Columbia Hockey League (BCHL) with the Salmon Arm Silverbacks in 2006–07, Nash scored 84 points in 55 games to finish as the Silverbacks' top scorer, rookie of the year and the team's most valuable player (MVP). Although he was drafted 21st overall by the Edmonton Oilers at the end of the season at the 2007 NHL entry draft, he opted against immediately signing with the team.

Instead, Nash went on to play college ice hockey at Cornell University of the NCAA's ECAC conference, where he was a linemate of future NHLer Colin Greening. As was the case at Salmon Arm, Nash played at Cornell with his older brother Brendon, a defenceman. In his freshman year with the Big Red, Nash was selected as the Cornell University Hockey Rookie of the Year and to the 2007–08 College Hockey News All-Rookie Team.

=== Professional ===
==== Carolina Hurricanes ====
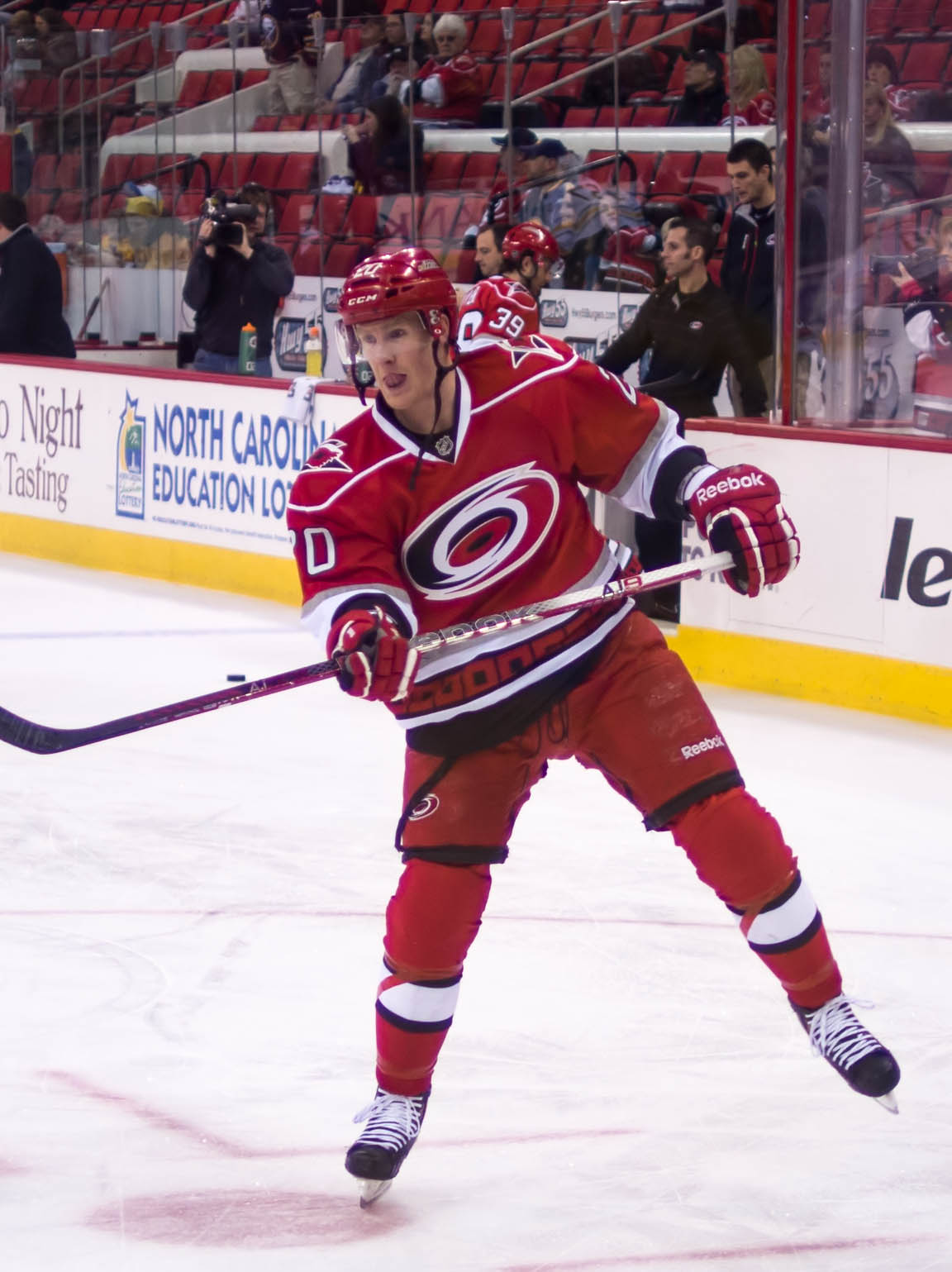
Nash with the Carolina Hurricanes in March 2013

On June 26, 2010, Nash was traded to the Carolina Hurricanes in exchange for the 46th pick at the 2010 NHL entry draft. Nearly one month later, on July 19, Nash signed a three-year, entry-level contract with the Hurricanes, forgoing his final year of eligibility at Cornell. He ended his collegiate career with 37 goals and 65 assists in 102 collegiate games. Following the signing, Nash joined the Hurricanes training camp but was reassigned to their American Hockey League (AHL) affiliate, the Charlotte Checkers, to begin the 2010–11 season. Nash remained with the Checkers for the entire season and became one of five rookies in the franchise's history to reach the 30-point mark. He also helped lead the team to the Eastern Conference Finals, the deepest playoff run the franchise had seen up at that point.

The following year, Nash was returned to the Checkers after attending the Hurricanes training camp. He played 31 games within the AHL, recording two goals and seven assists, before earning his first NHL recall on December 21, 2011. Nash made his NHL debut on that night against the Phoenix Coyotes and later recorded his first NHL assist on Andreas Nodl’s first-period goal against the Ottawa Senators. He was reassigned to the AHL once Tim Brent was healthy again but earned another recall on January 30, 2012. He played three more games with the Hurricanes following his second recall before being reassigned on February 6. Nash finished his second professional season with 20 points in 58 regular season AHL games.

Nash returned to the Checkers for the 2012–13 season after attending the Hurricanes 2012 training camp. By January, Nash matched a Checkers franchise record with four points in one game and surpassed his previous career high for points in a season. As a result, Nash was recalled to the NHL in March and recorded his first career NHL goal on March 2, 2013, against the Florida Panthers to give his team a 5–0 lead in the second period. He concluded his third season with the Hurricanes organization by signing a two-year, two-way contract worth $550,000 on the NHL level.

Following the signing of his contract, Nash became a mainstay in the Hurricanes lineup. He played the entire 2013–14 season in the NHL, where he recorded nine points in 32 games. Nash suffered a lower-body injury on December 31, 2013, and missed five games to recover. On March 31, 2015, Nash suffered a concussion and missed during warmups prior to a game against the Boston Bruins. He subsequently required 15 stitches on his ear to repair the damage and was placed out of the lineup to recover. Despite this, Nash concluded his second full season in the NHL with career-highs in assists and points. As a result, he signed a one-year $1,150,000 contract to remain with the Hurricanes in 2015–16.

==== Boston Bruins ====
After six seasons with the Hurricanes organization, Nash left as a free agent to sign a two-year contract with the Boston Bruins on July 1, 2016. Following the signing, Nash joined the Bruins for their 2016 training camp and played on their fourth line alongside Dominic Moore and Danton Heinen for their opening night. While serving in this role, Nash helped the Bruins qualify for the postseason for the first time since 2014.

The following year, Nash enjoyed a breakout season by establishing new career highs with 15 goals, 26 assists, and 41 points in 76 regular season games. At the start of the 2017–18 season, Nash replaced an injured Patrice Bergeron on the Bruins top line alongside Brad Marchand and David Pastrňák. He eventually returned to the Bruins third line, centering Tim Schaller and David Backes. On October 21, 2017, in a 5–4 loss to the Buffalo Sabres, Nash recorded the 100th point of his NHL career. By late December, Nash had scored 15 goals and tied his career high of three points in one game. Two months later, Nash tied a career high for goals in a season with 10 and set his career high in points with 26. Following another injury to the Bruins top line, Nash returned again to replace Bergeron in late February 2018.

While the Bruins qualified for the 2018 Stanley Cup playoffs, Nash missed Boston's final five games after a misfire shot by teammate Torey Krug resulted in more than 40 stitches to close a cut near his ear. As a result, he was expected to miss Game 1 of the playoffs against the Toronto Maple Leafs. Nash returned to the lineup for Game 3 against the Leafs and played with wingers Danton Heinen and David Backes. The following game, Nash played with Pastrnak and Marchand to help the Bruins win Game 4.

==== Columbus Blue Jackets ====
As a free agent, Nash left the Bruins and signed a three-year, $8.25 million contract with the Columbus Blue Jackets on July 1, 2018. When speaking about the signing, club general manager Jarmo Kekäläinen said "Nash is right-handed center who showed great versatility in having the best season of his career last year...he plays a very sound two-way game, will provide depth for our club down the middle and we are excited to welcome him to the Columbus Blue Jackets family." In his first season with the Jackets, Nash recorded three goals and nine assists for 12 points in 78 games. Despite this, Nash was a key part of the Jackets playoff roster until he was injured by former teammate Zdeno Chara in Game 2 of the second round. While he was recovering from the injury, the Blue Jackets failed to win a game and were eliminated from the post season.

During his second season, Nash was confined to a bottom-six center role where he recorded five goals and nine points in 70 games and finishing with a plus-minus of six. Nash also placed 12th across the league in goals allowed by his team per 60 minutes and fourth in expected goals allowed. During the 2020–21 season, Nash suffered a knee sprain in the second period of a 3–0 loss to the Florida Panthers and was placed on injured reserve on April 6, 2021.

==== Later years ====
While on injured reserve, Nash was traded by the Blue Jackets to the Toronto Maple Leafs for a conditional seventh-round pick in the 2022 NHL entry draft on April 9, 2021, with the pick converting to a sixth if Nash appeared in 25% of Toronto's playoff games (condition met when Nash played in 2 of Toronto's 7 games). Remaining on the sidelines for the regular season, Nash returned to play in the postseason, making his Maple Leafs debut, going scoreless in two contests of a first-round defeat to the Montreal Canadiens.

As a free agent from the Maple Leafs, on July 31, 2021, Nash remained in Canada by agreeing to a one-year, $750,000 contract with the Winnipeg Jets. In the following 2021–22 season, Nash in a fourth-line role went scoreless over 15 games before he was placed on waivers by the Jets. On December 7, Nash's tenure with the Jets ended as he was claimed off waivers by the two-time defending Stanley Cup champions, the Tampa Bay Lightning. After 10 games with the Lightning, Nash was placed on waivers again on January 5, 2022. He was subsequently claimed by the Arizona Coyotes, marking his seventh NHL club and fifth in under a calendar year.

Nash made 24 appearances with the rebuilding Coyotes, registering four assists. Prior to the NHL trade deadline, Nash was placed on waivers by the Coyotes and subsequently cleared. On March 21, 2022, he was traded back to the Lightning in exchange for future considerations as added forward depth insurance and he was immediately reassigned to AHL affiliate, the Syracuse Crunch.

He enjoyed an offensive resurgence in the AHL with the Charlotte Checkers in the 2022–23 season, lead the team in scoring with 24 goals, 35 assists for 59 points through 66 games.

As a free agent, Nash secured an NHL contract in agreeing to a two-year, two-way contract with the New York Rangers on July 1, 2023.

After missing the entirety of the 2024-25 season due to a knee injury, Nash announced his retirement from hockey on July 8, 2025.

== Personal life ==
Nash and his wife were married in summer of 2019, and the couple have one son.

== Career statistics ==
=== Regular season and playoffs ===
			Regular season					Playoffs
Season	Team	League	GP	G	A	Pts	PIM	GP	G	A	Pts	PIM
2004–05	Thompson Blazers AAA	Midget	26	22	21	43	28	—	—	—	—	—
2004–05	Salmon Arm Silverbacks	BCHL	1	0	0	0	0	—	—	—	—	—
2005–06	Thompson Blazers AAA	Midget	33	28	29	57	57	—	—	—	—	—
2005–06	Salmon Arm Silverbacks	BCHL	1	0	0	0	0	—	—	—	—	—
2006–07	Salmon Arm Silverbacks	BCHL	55	38	46	84	87	—	—	—	—	—
2007–08	Cornell University	ECAC	36	12	20	32	28	—	—	—	—	—
2008–09	Cornell University	ECAC	36	13	22	35	34	—	—	—	—	—
2009–10	Cornell University	ECAC	30	12	24	36	39	—	—	—	—	—
2010–11	Charlotte Checkers	AHL	79	14	18	32	26	16	1	3	4	16
2011–12	Charlotte Checkers	AHL	58	8	12	20	26	—	—	—	—	—
2011–12	Carolina Hurricanes	NHL	5	0	1	1	2	—	—	—	—	—
2012–13	Charlotte Checkers	AHL	51	13	24	37	20	5	1	2	3	0
2012–13	Carolina Hurricanes	NHL	32	4	5	9	8	—	—	—	—	—
2013–14	Carolina Hurricanes	NHL	73	10	14	24	29	—	—	—	—	—
2014–15	Carolina Hurricanes	NHL	68	8	17	25	12	—	—	—	—	—
2015–16	Carolina Hurricanes	NHL	64	9	13	22	18	—	—	—	—	—
2016–17	Boston Bruins	NHL	81	7	10	17	14	6	0	2	2	2
2017–18	Boston Bruins	NHL	76	15	26	41	18	9	0	1	1	4
2018–19	Columbus Blue Jackets	NHL	78	3	9	12	19	7	1	2	3	4
2019–20	Columbus Blue Jackets	NHL	64	5	9	14	10	10	1	1	2	0
2020–21	Columbus Blue Jackets	NHL	37	2	5	7	4	—	—	—	—	—
2020–21	Toronto Maple Leafs	NHL	—	—	—	—	—	2	0	0	0	0
2021–22	Winnipeg Jets	NHL	15	0	0	0	4	—	—	—	—	—
2021–22	Tampa Bay Lightning	NHL	10	0	0	0	2	8	0	0	0	2
2021–22	Arizona Coyotes	NHL	24	0	4	4	4	—	—	—	—	—
2021–22	Syracuse Crunch	AHL	17	10	8	18	4	—	—	—	—	—
2022–23	Charlotte Checkers	AHL	66	24	35	59	37	7	3	2	5	6
2023–24	Hartford Wolf Pack	AHL	41	11	16	27	38	7	4	2	6	0
2023–24	New York Rangers	NHL	1	0	0	0	0	—	—	—	—	—
NHL totals			579	63	109	172	134	42	2	6	8	12

=== International ===
Year	Team	Event	Result	GP	G	A	Pts	PIM
2006	Canada Pacific	U17	4th	6	0	3	3	0
Junior totals				6	0	3	3	0

== Awards and honours ==
Award	Year	Ref
BCHL
Interior Conference Rookie of the Year	2006–07	
College
All-ECAC Hockey Rookie Team	2007–08	
ECAC Hockey Rookie of the Year	2007–08	
Ivy League Hockey Rookie of the Year	2007–08	
All-ECAC Hockey First Team	2008–09	
All-ECAC Hockey Third Team	2009–10	
ECAC Hockey All-Tournament Team	2010	

Awards and achievements
Preceded by Sean Backman; Brandon Wong	ECAC Hockey Rookie of the Year; 2007–08	Succeeded by Jody O'Neill
Preceded by Alex Plante	Edmonton Oilers first-round draft pick 2007	Succeeded by Jordan Eberle
