= Bob McKenzie (broadcaster) =

Canadian hockey commentator (born 1956)

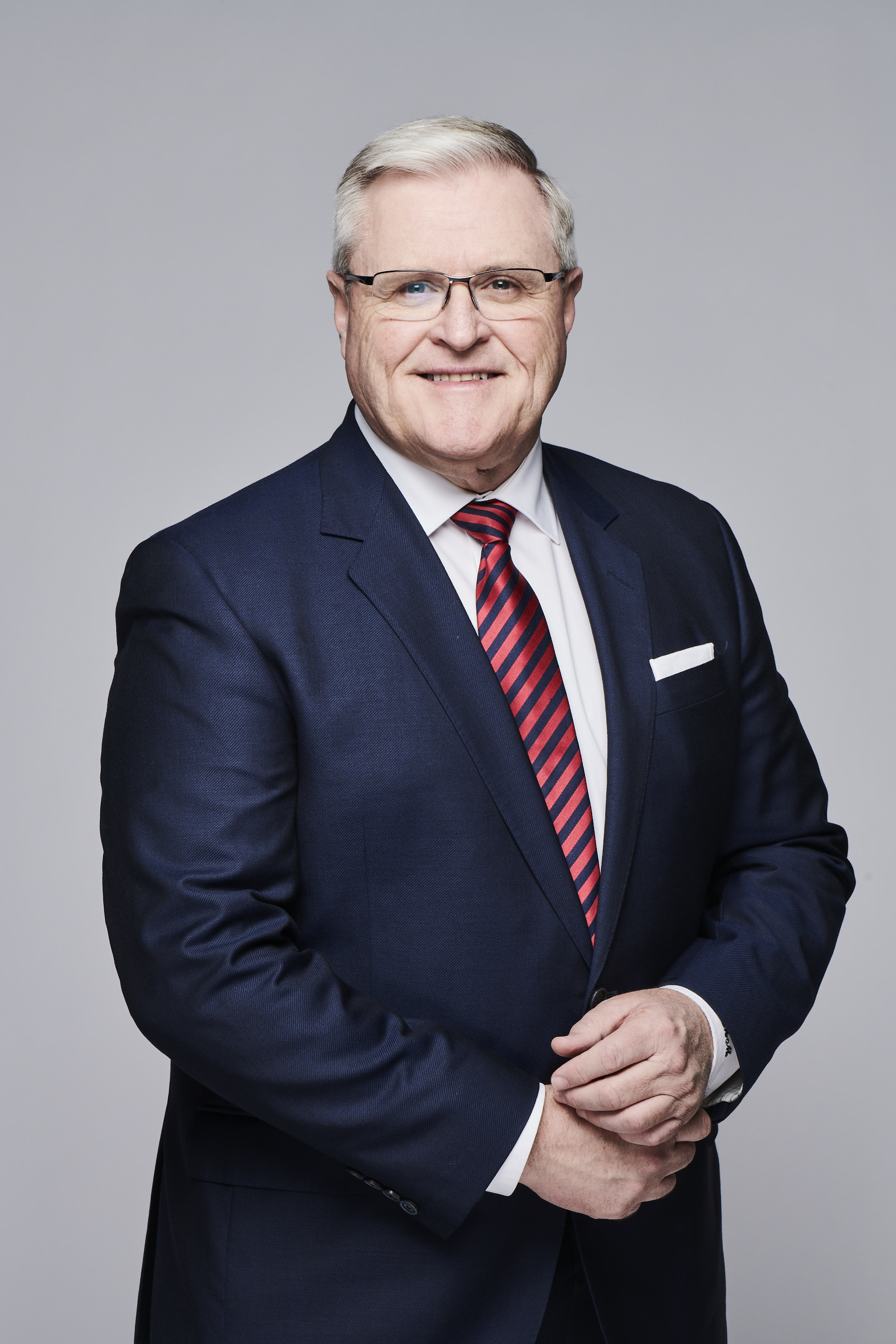
- Born: August 16, 1956 (age 70); Toronto, Ontario, Canada
- Occupation: Sportscaster
- Employer: TSN
- Known for: The NHL on TSN
- Spouse: Cindy
- Children: 3; including Mike McKenzie

Robert Malcomson McKenzie (born August 16, 1956) is a Canadian former hockey commentator who covered hockey at TSN from 1986 to 2025. As a TSN Hockey Insider and TSN's Draft Expert, McKenzie provided analysis for NHL on TSN telecasts, as well as for the IIHF World Junior Championships, NHL Draft, NHL Trade Deadline, Free Agency, and for six Olympic Winter Games.

== Early life and education ==
McKenzie was born in Toronto and attended Bendale Public School. After graduating from Ryerson Polytechnic Institute, McKenzie was hired for his first full-time newspaper job at The Sault Star in 1979.

== Career ==
In 1981, McKenzie quit The Sault Star and moved back to Toronto to earn a job in the sports department at one of the mainstream papers. Although he earned a position as a copy editor in The Globe and Mail's sports department, he was not offered any full-time positions.

In 1982, McKenzie was offered a position as editor-in-chief of The Hockey News. McKenzie stayed at the magazine for nine years before joining the Toronto Star as a hockey columnist until 1998. While with the Toronto Star, McKenzie was reporting from the Tampa Bay Lightning dressing room after a loss when he was asked to leave by Phil Esposito. Upon refusing, a scuffle ensued and McKenzie filed a complaint with Toronto police claiming assault. McKenzie returned to The Hockey News for three years where he participated in their half-hour segments on The Sports Network (TSN), and was eventually hired as an analyst for Canadian Hockey League games. He was eventually offered a position with TSN's broadcasting team in 2000.

In honour of his reporting skills, McKenzie won the Gemini Award for Best Studio Analyst for his work on the 2008 IIHF World Junior Championship: Gold Final.

In October 2014, McKenzie and Darren Dreger began appearing as full-time contributors on NBCSN. This was because TSN lost their NHL broadcasting rights package to Sportsnet. Two years later, he received the 2016 Canadian Screen award for Best Sports Analyst.

McKenzie was awarded the 2015 Elmer Ferguson Memorial Award, as selected by the Professional Hockey Writers Association. He was inducted into the Whitby Sports Hall of Fame in 2017. In 2019, McKenzie signed a five-year contract extension with TSN.

On July 1, 2025, McKenzie retired after 48 years as a commentator.

== Personal life ==
McKenzie and his wife Cindy have three sons, all of whom played hockey. Although one of his sons quit the sport due to concussions, his son Mike McKenzie went on to play professionally. Another son, Shawn, is a sportscaster for Sportsnet. Cindy is the older sister of John Goodwin, a former professional ice hockey player.
