= Chris D'Alvise =

Canadian ice hockey player

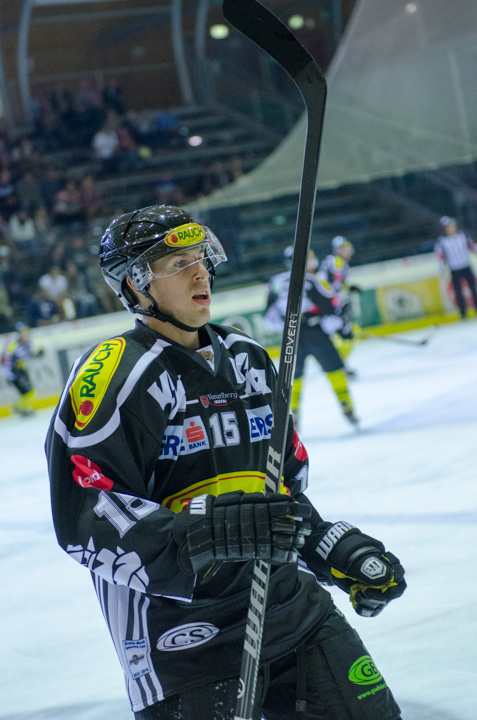
- Born: January 28, 1986 (age 40) Mississauga, Ontario, Canada
- Height: 5 ft 11 in (180 cm)
- Weight: 180 lb (82 kg; 12 st 12 lb)
- Position: Centre
- Shoots: Left
- Austrian National League team Former teams: EHC Lustenau; Springfield Falcons; HDD Olimpija Ljubljana
- NHL draft: Undrafted
- Playing career: 2009–present

Chris D'Alvise (born January 28, 1986) is a Canadian professional ice hockey player who is currently playing for EHC Lustenau in the Austrian National League. His father is Dan D'Alvise, who represented Canada at the 1980 Winter Olympics.

== Playing career ==
D'Alvise played hockey for four years while attending Clarkson University. In November 2010, he signed a professional try-out (PTO) agreement with the Springfield Falcons, after he scored 10 goals and 7 assists in 12 games with the Stockton Thunder of the ECHL. Through his first 28 games in with the Falcons, he has scored 9 goals and 9 assists, while wearing number 9. On January 14, 2011, D'Alvise signed a standard American Hockey League contract with the Falcons.

D'Alvise signed his first European contract with Slovenian club, HDD Olimpija Ljubljana of the Austrian EBEL. After a single season in 2012–13, D'Alvise moved to Austrian rival, Dornbirner EC on June 5, 2013.

== Career statistics ==
			Regular season					Playoffs
Season	Team	League	GP	G	A	Pts	PIM	GP	G	A	Pts	PIM
2003–04	Wexford Raiders	OPJHL	43	15	32	47	10	—	—	—	—	—
2004–05	Wexford Raiders	OPJHL	48	28	28	56	26	—	—	—	—	—
2005–06	Clarkson University	ECAC	37	8	17	25	10	—	—	—	—	—
2006–07	Clarkson University	ECAC	37	16	10	26	31	—	—	—	—	—
2007–08	Clarkson University	ECAC	39	12	17	29	20	—	—	—	—	—
2008–09	Clarkson University	ECAC	32	13	12	25	56	—	—	—	—	—
2009–10	Stockton Thunder	ECHL	68	34	33	67	38	13	6	3	9	4
2010–11	Stockton Thunder	ECHL	12	10	7	17	12	—	—	—	—	—
2010–11	Springfield Falcons	AHL	43	11	12	23	25	—	—	—	—	—
2011–12	Stockton Thunder	ECHL	22	11	9	20	27	8	3	5	8	39
2011–12	Springfield Falcons	AHL	3	0	0	0	0	—	—	—	—	—
2012–13	HDD Olimpija Ljubljana	EBEL	54	26	25	51	32	—	—	—	—	—
2013–14	Dornbirner EC	EBEL	54	32	18	50	16	6	4	4	8	32
2014–15	Dornbirner EC	EBEL	45	23	24	47	22	—	—	—	—	—
2015–16	Dornbirner EC	EBEL	54	26	21	47	30	6	1	1	2	6
AHL totals			46	11	12	23	25	—	—	—	—	—

== Awards and honors ==
Award	Year
ECAC Hockey All-Tournament Team	2007

Awards and achievements
Preceded by John Dagineau	ECAC Hockey Most Outstanding Player in Tournament; 2007	Succeeded by Zane Kalemba
