= Justin Krueger =

German-Canadian ice hockey player

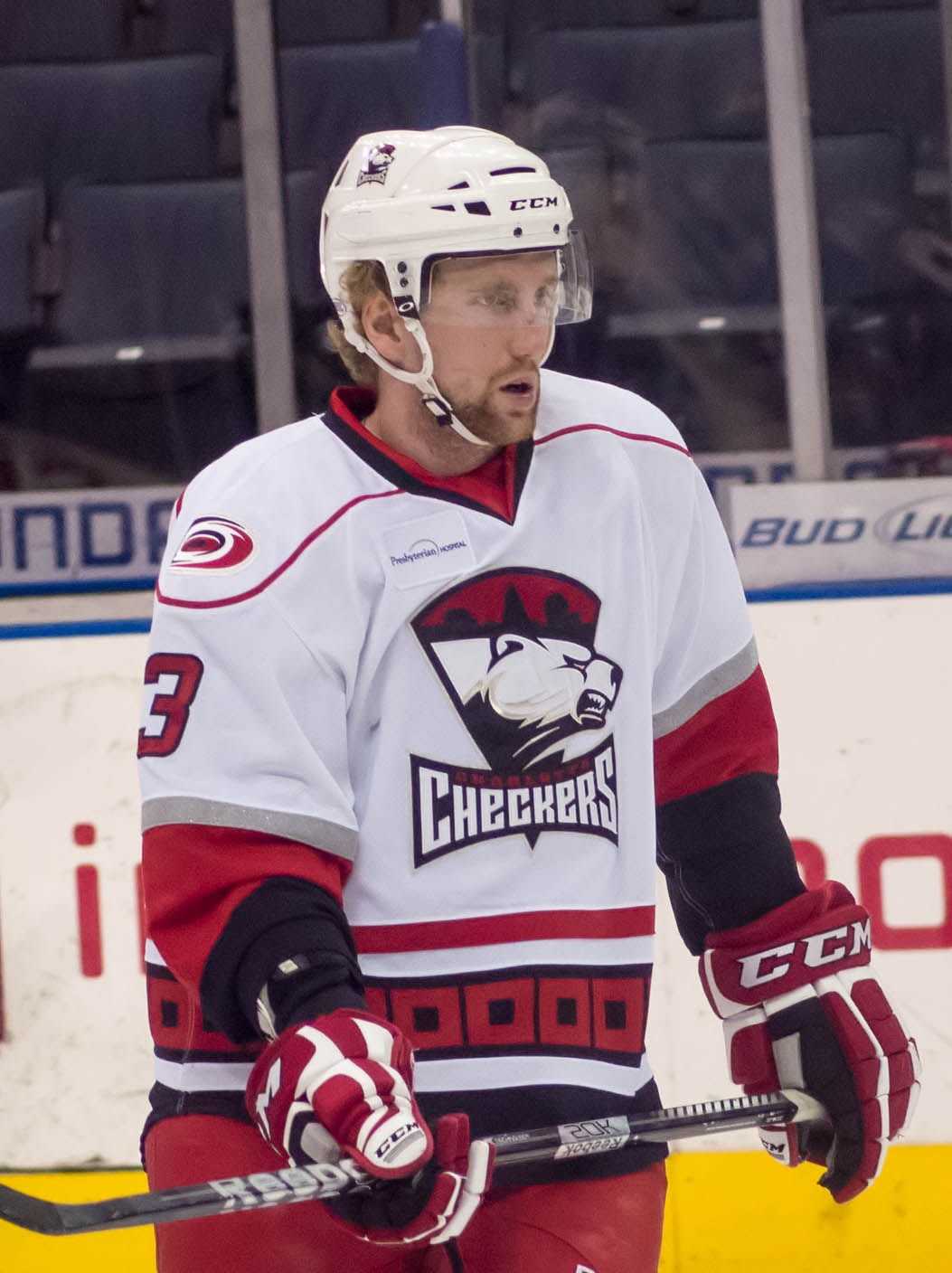
- Born: 6 October 1986 (age 39) Düsseldorf, West Germany
- Height: 6 ft 3 in (191 cm)
- Weight: 216 lb (98 kg; 15 st 6 lb)
- Position: Defence
- Shot: Right
- Played for: Charlotte Checkers; SC Bern; Lausanne HC
- National team: Germany
- NHL draft: 213th overall, 2006; Carolina Hurricanes
- Playing career: 2010–2022

Justin Matthew Krueger (born 6 October 1986) is a German-Canadian former professional ice hockey defenceman who played for SC Bern and Lausanne HC of the Swiss National League (NL) and for the Charlotte Checkers, the American Hockey League (AHL) affiliate of the Carolina Hurricanes. He was selected by the Hurricanes in the seventh round (213th overall) of the 2006 NHL entry draft.

== Playing career ==
Krueger began his ice hockey career at Duisburger SV in Germany, where his father Ralph Krueger had his first stint as a coach in 1989. After his father had signed with the Austrian club VEU Feldkirch in 1991, he continued his career in the Feldkirch youth setup. He then joined the HC Davos junior team, after his father had been named head coach of the Swiss men's national team.

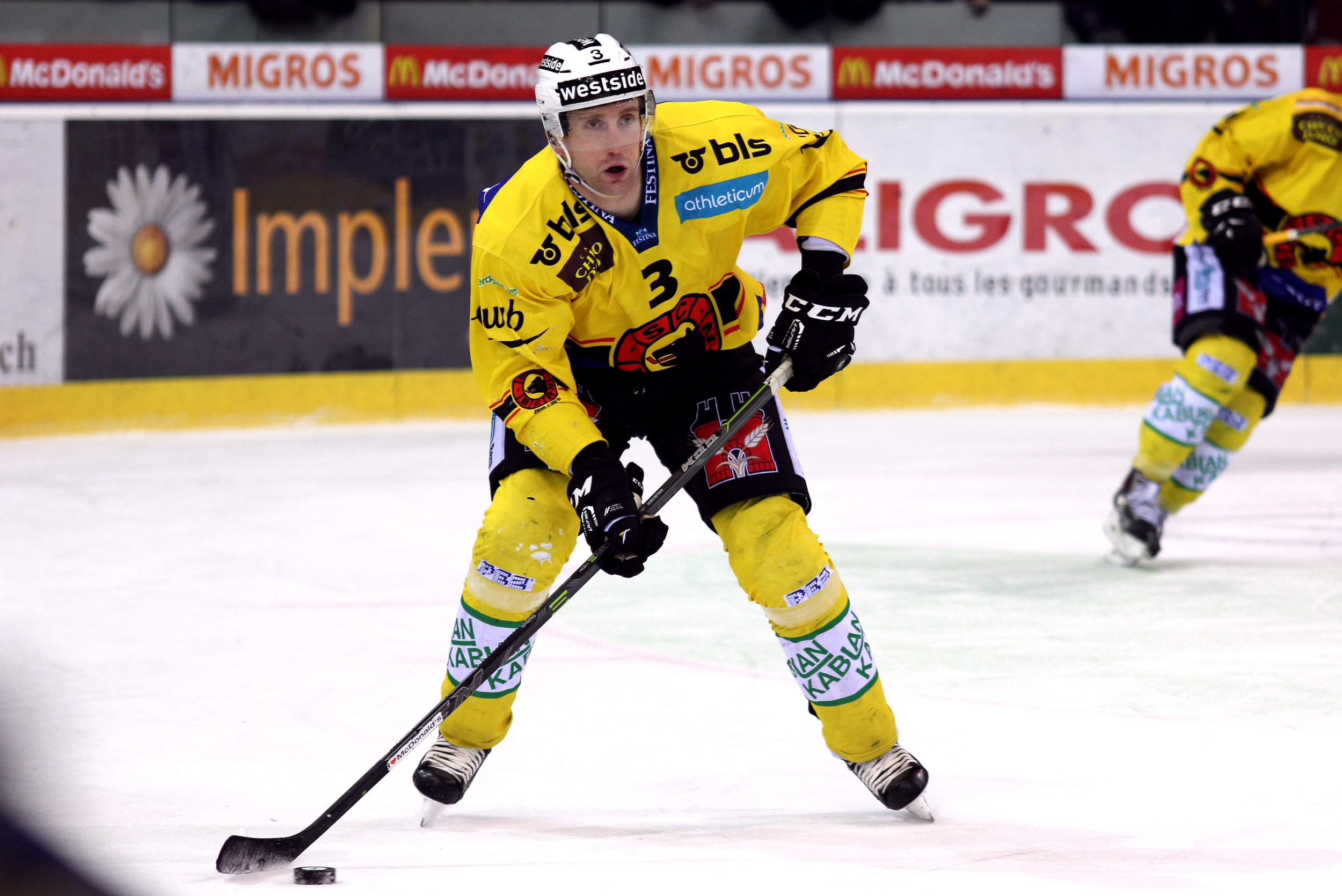
Krueger during his tenure with SC Bern.

In 2004, Justin recorded 17 points (five goals, 12 assists) in 38 games for HC Davos in the Swiss Junior League. Krueger moved after one year from Davos to North America and signed with the Penticton Vees of the BCHL. After this season he was named the Best Conditioned Athlete by the Penticton Vees and was drafted in the seventh round, 213th overall, by the Carolina Hurricanes in the 2006 NHL entry draft, being the last overall pick. He was then recruited to play collegiate hockey, joining the Cornell Big Red as a freshman in 2006. In his final season at Cornell (2009–10), Krueger was named ECAC Hockey Defensive Defenseman of the Year.

Krueger played for the SC Bern team in the 2010–11 season, and began playing in North America within the Carolina Hurricanes' farm system for the 2011–12 season. After two years in the American Hockey League, he returned to SC Bern on a two-year deal in May 2013 and in November 2014 had his contract extended through the 2017–18 season. He won the Swiss championship with SCB in 2016 and 2017.

On June 2, 2020, Krueger joined Lausanne HC on a one-year deal.

== International play ==
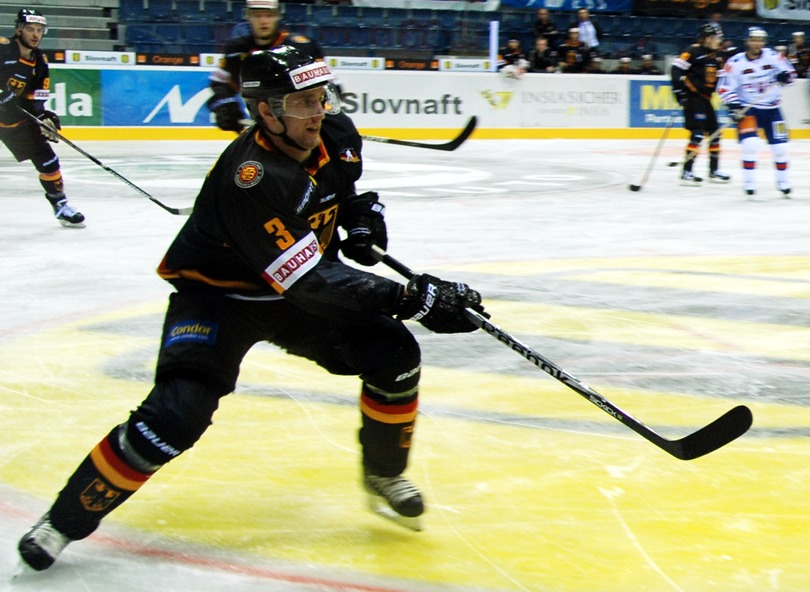
Krueger with the German national team.

Krueger landed a spot on the roster of the German under-18 Men's National Team in 2003 and represented Germany at the 2004 under-18 and 2005 under-20 World Championships. At the 2005 tournament, he served as captain of the German squad.

He first tried out for the German Men's National Team before the 2009 Deutschland Cup held in Munich, Germany, but did not play for that tournament. He was chosen to play for Team Germany for the first time in April 2010 and then participated in the 2010 IIHF World Championship in Germany. In October 2018, he retired from the German men's national team. He received 99 caps during his international career, representing Team Germany at seven World Championships.

== Personal life ==
Krueger is the son of former Buffalo Sabres head coach Ralph Krueger. In 2010, he earned a bachelor's degree in hotel management at Cornell University. His paternal grandparents emigrated to Canada from Germany in 1952.

== Career statistics ==
=== Regular season and playoffs ===
			Regular season					Playoffs
Season	Team	League	GP	G	A	Pts	PIM	GP	G	A	Pts	PIM
2002–03	HC Davos	SUI U20	12	0	0	0	4	2	0	0	0	0
2002–03	HC Prättigau–Herrschaft	SUI.4	12	0	3	3		—	—	—	—	—
2003–04	HC Davos	SUI U20	33	2	0	2	14	—	—	—	—	—
2003–04	EHC Lenzerheide–Valbella	SUI.3	2	0	0	0		—	—	—	—	—
2004–05	HC Davos	SUI U20	38	5	12	17	76	4	1	2	3	2
2004–05	EHC St. Moritz	SUI.3	9	1	0	1		—	—	—	—	—
2005–06	Penticton Vees	BCHL	55	7	15	22	25	15	3	6	9	13
2006–07	Cornell University	ECAC	31	1	5	6	24	—	—	—	—	—
2007–08	Cornell University	ECAC	35	4	5	9	33	—	—	—	—	—
2008–09	Cornell University	ECAC	35	1	4	5	24	—	—	—	—	—
2009–10	Cornell University	ECAC	34	1	11	12	22	—	—	—	—	—
2010–11	SC Bern	NLA	50	1	10	11	61	11	0	2	2	8
2011–12	Charlotte Checkers	AHL	58	2	11	13	36	—	—	—	—	—
2012–13	Charlotte Checkers	AHL	69	1	14	15	31	5	0	2	2	0
2013–14	SC Bern	NLA	48	3	5	8	26	—	—	—	—	—
2014–15	SC Bern	NLA	41	3	14	17	43	9	0	0	0	2
2015–16	SC Bern	NLA	43	5	13	18	10	13	1	0	1	14
2016–17	SC Bern	NLA	47	1	3	4	33	16	1	3	4	31
2017–18	SC Bern	NL	48	0	2	2	49	10	1	0	1	2
2018–19	SC Bern	NL	41	0	6	6	59	18	0	2	2	0
2019–20	SC Bern	NL	39	0	2	2	39	—	—	—	—	—
2020–21	Lausanne HC	NL	47	0	0	0	6	6	0	0	0	25
2021–22	Lausanne HC	NL	40	0	1	1	14	8	0	0	0	2
NLA/NL totals			444	13	56	69	340	91	3	7	10	84
AHL totals			127	3	25	28	67	5	0	2	2	0

=== International ===
Year	Team	Event	Result	GP	G	A	Pts	PIM
2004	Germany	WJC18 D1	11th	5	0	1	1	4
2006	Germany	WJC D1	11th	5	0	1	1	2
2010	Germany	WC	4th	9	0	1	1	0
2011	Germany	WC	7th	7	0	1	1	8
2012	Germany	WC	12th	7	1	0	1	2
2013	Germany	WC	9th	4	0	0	0	0
2014	Germany	WC	14th	6	0	0	0	4
2015	Germany	WC	10th	7	0	2	2	2
2017	Germany	WC	8th	8	0	0	0	2
Junior totals				10	0	2	2	6
Senior totals				48	1	4	5	18

== Awards and honors ==
Award	Year
College
ECAC All-Tournament Team	2010
ECAC Best Defensive Defenseman	2010
NL
Champion (SC Bern)	2016, 2017, 2019

Awards and achievements
Preceded by Matt Generous	ECAC Hockey Best Defensive Defenseman; 2009–10	Succeeded by Brock Matheson
