= Colin Greening =

Canadian ice hockey player (born 1986)

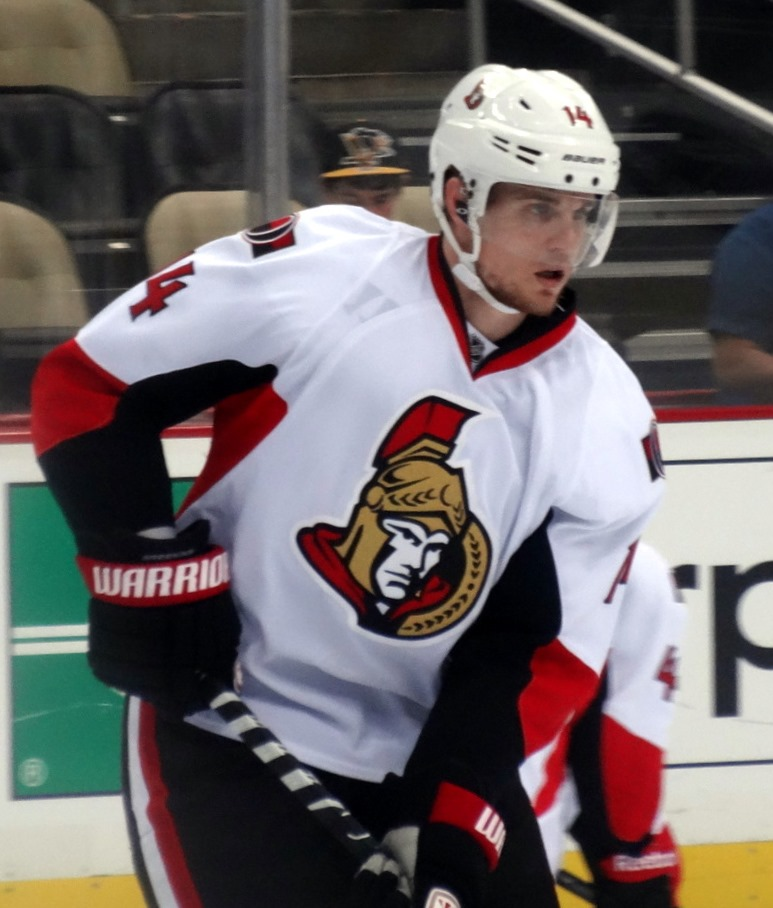
- With the Senators during the 2013 playoffs
- Born: March 9, 1986 (age 40) St. John's, Newfoundland, Canada
- Height: 6 ft 2 in (188 cm)
- Weight: 210 lb (95 kg; 15 st 0 lb)
- Position: Left wing
- Shot: Left
- Played for: Ottawa Senators; Aalborg Pirates; Toronto Maple Leafs
- NHL draft: 204th overall, 2005; Ottawa Senators
- Playing career: 2010–2019

Colin Peter Greening (born March 9, 1986) is a Canadian former professional ice hockey left winger. He played for the Ottawa Senators and the Toronto Maple Leafs in the National Hockey League (NHL). He was originally drafted by the Senators in the seventh round, 204th overall, in the 2005 NHL entry draft.

== Playing career ==
While playing for Upper Canada College in Toronto, Ontario, Greening was selected by the Ottawa Senators in the seventh round, 204th overall, of the 2005 NHL entry draft. Greening played four full seasons of NCAA collegiate hockey at Cornell University without missing a single game, serving as captain in his junior and senior year and being selected for membership in the Quill and Dagger society. At Cornell, Greening played on a line with another future NHLer, Riley Nash.

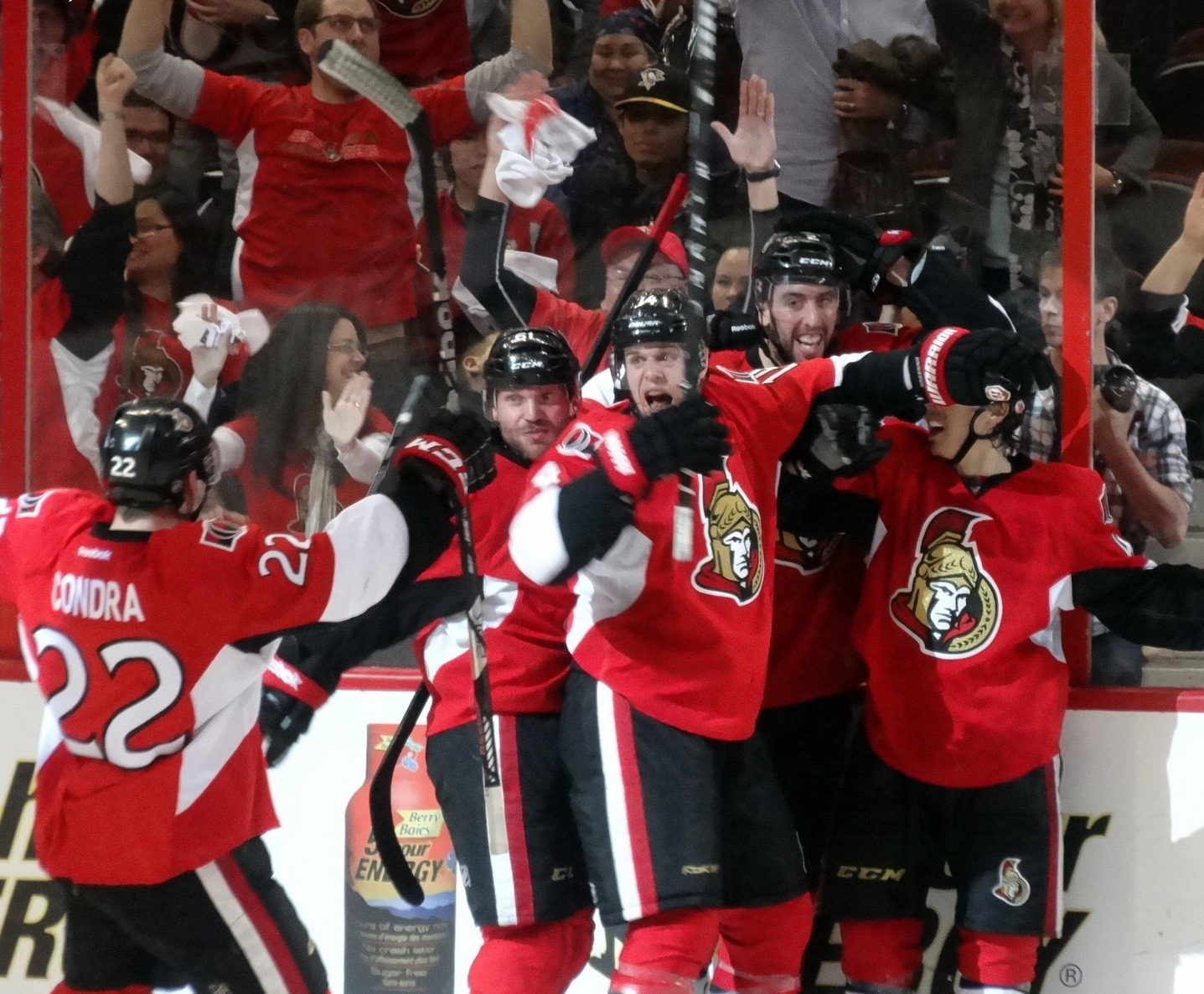
Greening scored the game-winning goal in double overtime for the Ottawa Senators in game three during the 2013 Stanley Cup playoffs against the Pittsburgh Penguins.

After graduating from Cornell in 2010, Greening joined the Binghamton Senators of the American Hockey League (AHL), the top minor league affiliate of the Ottawa Senators. He made his NHL debut on February 1, 2011, in a game in Newark against the New Jersey Devils. On March 3, 2011, Greening scored his first career NHL goal against the Atlanta Thrashers in a 3–1 Ottawa victory. On May 19, 2011, Greening was signed to a three-year, one-way contract by the Senators that will pay him $700,000 in 2011–12, $800,000 in 2012–13, and $950,000 in 2013–14.

On January 12, 2012, Greening was selected to participate in the NHL YoungStars Game, which coincided with the 2012 All-Star Game held in Ottawa. He finished his rookie season with 17 goals and 37 points while playing in all 82 of Ottawa's games, largely playing on the first line with Daniel Alfredsson and Jason Spezza.

During the 2012–13 NHL lockout, Greening spent time with the Aalborg Pirates of Denmark's AL-Bank Ligaen.

On September 9, 2013, Greening signed a three-year, $7.95 million contract extension that pays him $2 million in 2014–15, $2.75 million in 2015–16 and $3.2 million in 2016–17. Since 2015, his playing time has been split between Ottawa and Binghamton.

On February 9, 2016, Greening was traded to the Toronto Maple Leafs in a nine-player deal which saw Dion Phaneuf going to the Ottawa Senators. Greening would make his Toronto debut two days later against the Edmonton Oilers.

On July 1, 2017, Greening as a free agent opted to remain with the Maple Leafs, re-signing to a one-year, two-way deal. After the conclusion of the 2017–18 season, where the Marlies won their first Calder Cup, Greening signed a one-year AHL contract with the Marlies.

Following the 2018–19 AHL season, Greening retired from professional hockey in order to further his education, enrolling at Harvard Business School to pursue a Master of Business Administration (MBA).

== Career statistics ==
			Regular season					Playoffs
Season	Team	League	GP	G	A	Pts	PIM	GP	G	A	Pts	PIM
2002–03	St. John’s Maple Leafs AAA	NLMHL	60	24	34	58	48	—	—	—	—	—
2003–04	Upper Canada College	CISAA	53	30	43	73	40	—	—	—	—	—
2004–05	Upper Canada College	CISAA	35	24	22	46	24	—	—	—	—	—
2005–06	Nanaimo Clippers	BCHL	56	27	35	62	46	5	3	0	3	2
2006–07	Cornell University	ECAC	31	11	8	19	26	—	—	—	—	—
2007–08	Cornell University	ECAC	36	14	19	33	41	—	—	—	—	—
2008–09	Cornell University	ECAC	36	15	16	31	28	—	—	—	—	—
2009–10	Cornell University	ECAC	34	15	20	35	31	—	—	—	—	—
2010–11	Binghamton Senators	AHL	59	15	25	40	41	23	1	4	5	13
2010–11	Ottawa Senators	NHL	24	6	7	13	10	—	—	—	—	—
2011–12	Ottawa Senators	NHL	82	17	20	37	46	7	0	1	1	0
2012–13	Aalborg Pirates	DNK	17	13	12	25	12	—	—	—	—	—
2012–13	Ottawa Senators	NHL	47	8	11	19	11	10	3	1	4	2
2013–14	Ottawa Senators	NHL	76	6	11	17	41	—	—	—	—	—
2014–15	Ottawa Senators	NHL	26	1	0	1	29	—	—	—	—	—
2014–15	Binghamton Senators	AHL	12	5	2	7	13	—	—	—	—	—
2015–16	Binghamton Senators	AHL	41	7	6	13	52	—	—	—	—	—
2015–16	Ottawa Senators	NHL	1	0	0	0	0	—	—	—	—	—
2015–16	Toronto Maple Leafs	NHL	30	7	8	15	13	—	—	—	—	—
2016–17	Toronto Marlies	AHL	69	10	14	24	49	11	2	2	4	0
2017–18	Toronto Marlies	AHL	73	16	13	29	35	20	4	5	9	10
2018–19	Toronto Marlies	AHL	61	4	10	14	8	13	1	0	1	0
NHL totals			286	45	57	102	150	17	3	2	5	2

== Awards and honors ==
Award	Year
College
All-ECAC Hockey Second team	2007–08
All-ECAC Hockey Second team	2008–09
All-ECAC Hockey Second team	2009–10
ECAC Hockey All-Tournament Team	2010
ECAC Hockey Student-Athlete of the Year	2009–10
Lowe's Senior CLASS Award (ice hockey)	2010
All-Ivy League First Team All-Star	2010
ESPN The Magazine/CoSIDA Academic All-America First Team	2010
AHL
2x Calder Cup Champion (Binghamton Senators; Toronto Marlies)	2011, 2018
NHL
YoungStars Game	2012

Awards and achievements
Preceded by Matt Cook	ECAC Hockey Student-Athlete of the Year; 2009–10	Succeeded by Stéphane Boileau
