= J. T. Wyman =

American ice hockey player

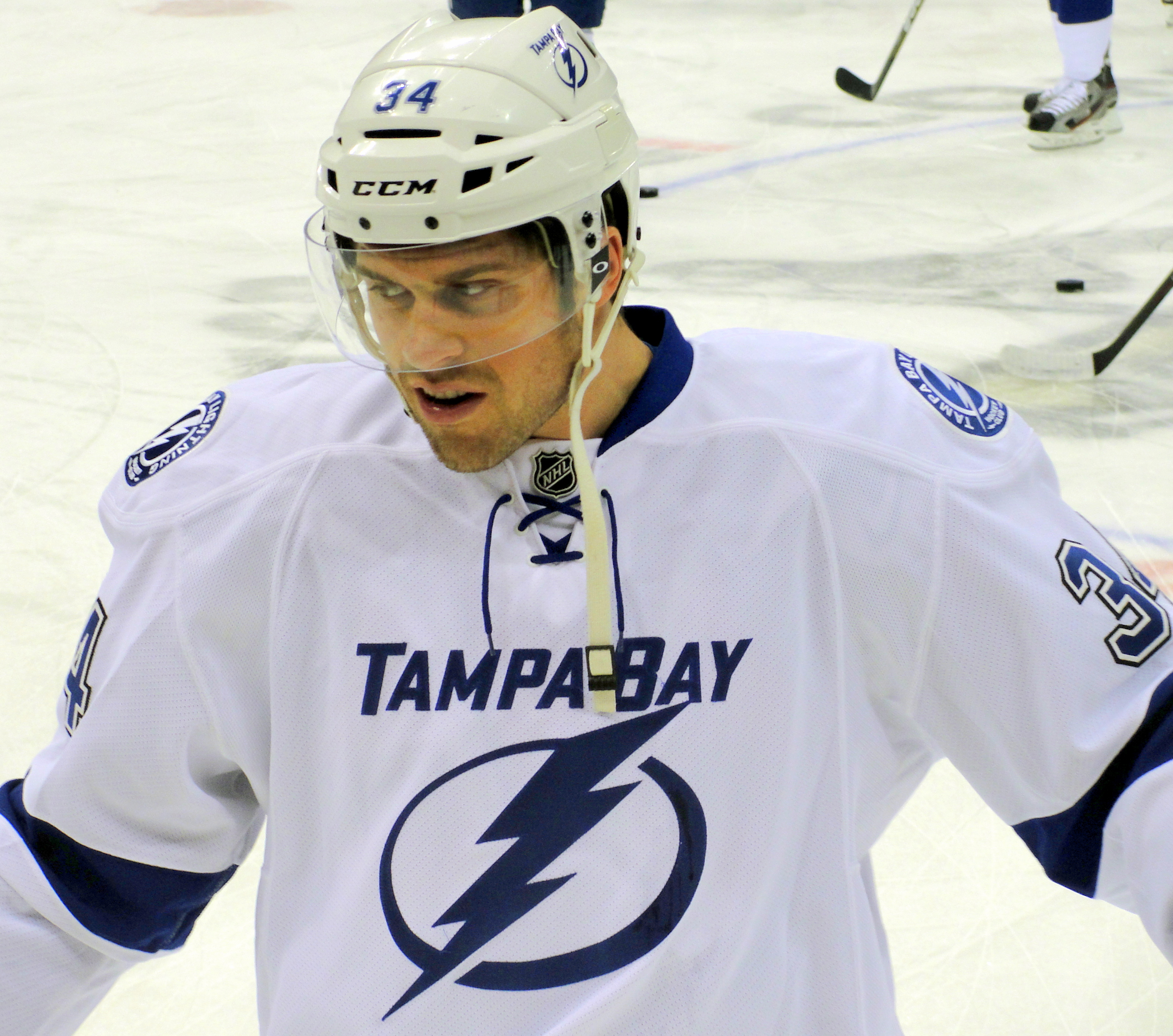
- Wyman with the Tampa Bay Lightning in 2012
- Born: February 27, 1986 (age 40) Edina, Minnesota, U.S.
- Height: 6 ft 2 in (188 cm)
- Weight: 212 lb (96 kg; 15 st 2 lb)
- Position: Right wing
- Shot: Right
- Played for: Montreal Canadiens; Tampa Bay Lightning; Thomas Sabo Ice Tigers
- NHL draft: 100th overall, 2004; Montreal Canadiens
- Playing career: 2008–2015

James Thomas Wyman (born February 27, 1986) is an American former professional ice hockey right winger. He was selected in the fourth round, 100th overall, by the Montreal Canadiens in the 2004 NHL entry draft. During his NHL career, Wyman also played for the Tampa Bay Lightning.

== Playing career ==
Wyman was originally drafted in the fourth round, 100th overall, by the Montreal Canadiens in the 2004 NHL entry draft. After attending The Blake School (Minneapolis), Wyman committed to a four-year collegiate career with Dartmouth College. Wyman was signed by the Canadiens to a two-year entry-level contract. In the 2009–10 season, Wyman was recalled from AHL affiliate, the Hamilton Bulldogs, and made his NHL debut with the Canadiens against the Columbus Blue Jackets on November 24, 2009.

On July 1, 2011, Wyman was signed as an unrestricted free agent by the Tampa Bay Lightning. On December 29, 2011, as a member of the Lighting, Wyman scored his first NHL goal against Carey Price of the Montreal Canadiens, the team that drafted him. Wyman appeared in a career high 40 games for the Lightning, recording 2 goals and 11 points.

On June 15, 2012, Wyman was re-signed by the Lightning to a one-year extension. Due to the NHL lockout, he was assigned to new Lightning AHL affiliate, the Syracuse Crunch. Wyman spent the majority of the 2012–13 season with the Crunch, compiling 38 points in 76 games as the Crunch reached the Calder Cup finals. He was recalled by the Lightning to play in a solitary game against the Buffalo Sabres on April 14, 2013.

Wyman left the Lightning organization as a free agent and signed a one-year contract with the Colorado Avalanche on July 5, 2013. After attending the Avalanche training camp he was reassigned to AHL affiliate, the Lake Erie Monsters to begin the 2013–14 season. As a veteran on the Monsters, Wyman was selected as an alternate captain and remained with the club for the year. Unable to accumulate the previous season's production, Wyman finished with 7 goals and 22 points in 66 games. He was not re-signed by the Avalanche at the end of his contract and was released to free agency.

Unsigned, on September 17, 2014, Wyman accepted an invitation to attend the Vancouver Canucks 2014 training camp on a professional try-out. Upon his release from camp, Wyman signed a one-year contract abroad with German club, Thomas Sabo Ice Tigers of the DEL on October 7, 2014.

== Career statistics ==
			Regular season					Playoffs
Season	Team	League	GP	G	A	Pts	PIM	GP	G	A	Pts	PIM
2001–02	The Blake School	HSMN	26	7	5	12		—	—	—	—	—
2002–03	The Blake School	HSMN	28	17	23	40	12	—	—	—	—	—
2003–04	Team TDS Transportation	UMSEHL	24	8	8	16		—	—	—	—	—
2003–04	The Blake School	HSMN	27	31	24	55	4	—	—	—	—	—
2004–05	Dartmouth College	ECAC	33	5	6	11	4	—	—	—	—	—
2005–06	Dartmouth College	ECAC	28	8	12	20	6	—	—	—	—	—
2006–07	Dartmouth College	ECAC	33	13	11	24	20	—	—	—	—	—
2007–08	Dartmouth College	ECAC	29	15	15	30	18	—	—	—	—	—
2007–08	Hamilton Bulldogs	AHL	8	0	1	1	5	—	—	—	—	—
2008–09	Hamilton Bulldogs	AHL	52	6	5	11	8	6	0	1	1	2
2008–09	Cincinnati Cyclones	ECHL	15	0	8	8	4	—	—	—	—	—
2009–10	Hamilton Bulldogs	AHL	76	17	20	37	12	19	1	3	4	2
2009–10	Montreal Canadiens	NHL	3	0	0	0	0	—	—	—	—	—
2010–11	Hamilton Bulldogs	AHL	80	18	18	36	36	20	3	5	8	8
2011–12	Norfolk Admirals	AHL	29	6	6	12	6	—	—	—	—	—
2011–12	Tampa Bay Lightning	NHL	40	2	9	11	8	—	—	—	—	—
2012–13	Syracuse Crunch	AHL	76	13	25	38	34	18	3	4	7	11
2012–13	Tampa Bay Lightning	NHL	1	0	0	0	0	—	—	—	—	—
2013–14	Lake Erie Monsters	AHL	66	7	15	22	31	—	—	—	—	—
2014–15	Thomas Sabo Ice Tigers	DEL	44	2	5	7	22	8	0	1	1	6
AHL totals			387	67	90	157	132	63	7	13	20	23
NHL totals			44	2	9	11	8	—	—	—	—	—
