= Aaron Volpatti =

Canadian ice hockey player

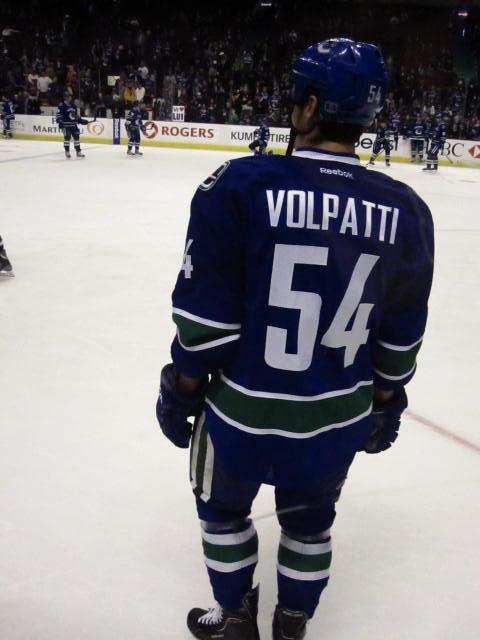
- Volpatti with the Vancouver Canucks in 2011
- Born: May 30, 1985 (age 41) Revelstoke, British Columbia, Canada
- Height: 6 ft 0 in (183 cm)
- Weight: 215 lb (98 kg; 15 st 5 lb)
- Position: Left wing
- Shot: Left
- Played for: Vancouver Canucks; Washington Capitals
- NHL draft: Undrafted
- Playing career: 2010–2015

Anthony Aaron Volpatti (born May 30, 1985) is a Canadian former professional ice hockey winger who played with the Vancouver Canucks and the Washington Capitals of the National Hockey League (NHL).

== Playing career ==
A native of Revelstoke, British Columbia, Volpatti played Junior A hockey for the Vernon Vipers of the British Columbia Hockey League (BCHL). After recording 5 points (1 goal and 4 assists) over 55 games as a rookie in 2003–04, he improved to 18 points (6 goals and 12 assists) over 57 games the following season. In the 2005 BCHL playoffs, the Vipers advanced to the Fred Page Cup Finals, where they were defeated by the Surrey Eagles. During a team camping trip that summer, Volpatti received burns to over 35% of his body (including his abdomen and face) in a bonfire accident. Hospitalized for five months, doctors told him he would not play again for two years, if at all. The use of his right hand was in particular jeopardy. Despite the prognosis, Volpatti returned to the lineup for the start of the 2005–06 season, although injuries to his muscles limited him to 25 of the team's 60 games. Upon his lengthy recovery from those injuries he recorded 6 goals and 14 points.

Following his three-year junior career, Volpatti moved on to the college level, joining the Brown Bears of the ECAC Hockey Conference (within the National Collegiate Athletic Association; NCAA circuit). Vopatti majored in human biology at the university and captained the team during his four-year college tenure. After recording a college career-high 32 points over 37 games with Brown in 2009–10, Volpatti was signed as a free agent by the Vancouver Canucks of the National Hockey League (NHL) on March 22, 2010. He was subsequently assigned to their American Hockey League (AHL) affiliate, the Manitoba Moose, for the remainder of their 2009–10 season. He recorded one goal and one assist over eight games.

After attending his first NHL training camp with the team in September 2010, Volpatti was reassigned to the Moose for the start of the 2010–11 season. He received his first NHL call-up on December 16, and made his NHL debut two nights later in a home game against the Toronto Maple Leafs. He scored his first NHL goal in his second game against Jaroslav Halak of the St. Louis Blues on December 20, 2010. Volpatti finished his rookie professional season with a goal and an assist over 15 NHL games and 11 points (2 goals and 9 assists) over 53 AHL games. He added 3 points (1 goal and 2 assists) over 12 AHL playoff games.

The following season, Volpatti made the Canucks' roster out of training camp, playing on the fourth line with Maxim Lapierre and Dale Weise. During a game against the Los Angeles Kings in November 2011, Volpatti hurt his shoulder after receiving a hit from opposing defenceman Matt Greene. Playing through the injury, he re-aggravated his shoulder the following month. Diagnosed with a torn left labrum, the injury required surgery that sidelined him for the remainder of the season.

In the off-season Volpatti re-signed with the Canucks, signing a one-year two-way contract. The deal was a slight pay cut for Volpatti's NHL salary and much larger cut at the minor league level. His NHL salary went from $625,000 to $600,000, while his minor league contract went from $200,000 to $105,000. The minor league salary represented the maximum amount allowed to avoid being subject to re-entry or recall waivers. He began the 2012–13 season with the Canucks, playing in 16 games, and scoring 1 goal. After Vancouver had players return from injury Volpatti became the team's thirteenth forward and a regular healthy scratch. Needing a roster spot to activate forward Steve Pinizzotto from the injured reserve list, the Canucks put Volpatti on waivers. Vancouver's plan was to assign him to their minor league affiliate, the Chicago Wolves, in order to give him increased playing time and work on the penalty kill. However, before that could happen he was claimed off waivers by the Washington Capitals.

== Career statistics ==
			Regular season					Playoffs
Season	Team	League	GP	G	A	Pts	PIM	GP	G	A	Pts	PIM
2003–04	Vernon Vipers	BCHL	55	1	4	5	134	—	—	—	—	—
2004–05	Vernon Vipers	BCHL	57	6	12	18	106	—	—	—	—	—
2005–06	Vernon Vipers	BCHL	25	6	8	14	39	—	—	—	—	—
2006–07	Brown University	ECAC	23	5	2	7	39	—	—	—	—	—
2007–08	Brown University	ECAC	31	4	6	10	28	—	—	—	—	—
2008–09	Brown University	ECAC	32	6	7	13	54	—	—	—	—	—
2009–10	Brown University	ECAC	37	17	15	32	115	—	—	—	—	—
2009–10	Manitoba Moose	AHL	8	1	1	2	17	5	1	0	1	21
2010–11	Manitoba Moose	AHL	53	2	9	11	74	12	1	2	3	36
2010–11	Vancouver Canucks	NHL	15	1	1	2	16	—	—	—	—	—
2011–12	Vancouver Canucks	NHL	23	1	0	1	37	—	—	—	—	—
2012–13	Vancouver Canucks	NHL	16	1	0	1	28	—	—	—	—	—
2012–13	Washington Capitals	NHL	17	0	1	1	7	—	—	—	—	—
2013–14	Washington Capitals	NHL	41	2	0	2	49	—	—	—	—	—
NHL totals			112	5	2	7	137	—	—	—	—	—

== Awards and honors ==
College

Award	Year
All-ECAC Hockey Third Team	2009–10
