= Mike McKenzie (ice hockey) =

Canadian ice hockey player (born 1986)

- Born: April 29, 1986 (age 40) Whitby, Ontario, Canada
- Height: 6 ft 0 in (183 cm)
- Weight: 190 lb (86 kg; 13 st 8 lb)
- Position: Left wing
- Shot: Left
- Played for: St. Lawrence Saints; Albany River Rats; Charlotte Checkers; Florida Everblades; Houston Aeros; Ontario Reign
- Coached for: Kitchener Rangers
- Playing career: 2006–2012
- Coaching career: 2012–present

Mike McKenzie (born April 29, 1986) is a Canadian former professional ice hockey player who last played for the Ontario Reign in the ECHL during the 2011–12 season. He is the son of The Sports Network (TSN) hockey analyst Bob McKenzie. McKenzie is currently the general manager of the Kitchener Rangers of the Ontario Hockey League.

== College hockey ==
=== St. Lawrence Saints (2006-2010) ===
McKenzie joined the St. Lawrence Saints of the NCAA for the 2006-07 season, where as a freshman, he scored 12 goals and 25 points in 31 games, finishing fourth in team scoring. The Saints won the Cleary Cup as the top regular season team in the ECAC Hockey Conference.

In his sophomore season with the club during the 2007-08 season, McKenzie skated in 34 games, scoring seven goals and 20 points for the rebuilding Saints. McKenzie was named to the ECAC All-Academic Team during this season.

In 2008-09, during his junior season with the Saints, McKenzie saw his offensive production increase to new heights, as he scored 16 goals and 34 points in 38 games to lead the club in scoring. For the second consecutive season, McKenzie was named to the ECAC All-Academic Team.

In his final season with St. Lawrence in 2009-10, McKenzie was named an alternate captain. In 41 games, McKenzie scored 14 goals and 35 points, finishing second on the club in both goals and points.

Overall, in four years with the Saints, McKenzie scored 49 goals and 114 points in 165 games.

== Professional career ==
=== Albany River Rats (2009-2010) ===
On March 24, 2010, McKenzie was signed to an Amateur Tryout with the Albany River Rats of the American Hockey League. The River Rats were the top minor league of the Carolina Hurricanes of the National Hockey League.

McKenzie made his professional hockey debut on April 3, 2010, as he recorded his first career AHL point, an assist on a goal scored by Brad Herauf, in a 4-2 victory over the Adirondack Phantoms. McKenzie would appear in three games with Albany during the 2009-10 season, earning one assist.

=== Charlotte Checkers (2010-2012) ===
On August 3, 2010, McKenzie signed a one-year contract with the Charlotte Checkers of the American Hockey League. The Checkers were the top affiliate of the Carolina Hurricanes, as McKenzie had an amateur tryout with their previous AHL affiliate, the Albany River Rats in the 2009-10 season.

McKenzie was assigned to the Florida Everblades of the ECHL after training camp. In 55 games with Florida, McKenzie scored 18 goals and 38 points, earning a promotion back to the AHL with Charlotte. On March 22, 2011, McKenzie scored his first career AHL goal against Michael Leighton of the Adirondack Phantoms in a 5-2 victory. McKenzie finished the 2010-11 season by playing 14 games with Charlotte and recording the one goal. In December 2010, McKenzie was named the ECHL Rookie of the Month after scoring nine goals and 17 points in 14 games with the Everblades.

The Checkers extended McKenzie's contract, however, McKenzie was once again assigned to the Everblades to begin the 2011-12 season. In 19 games with Florida, McKenzie scored five goals and 15 points.

In December 2011, McKenzie was traded to the Houston Aeros.

=== Houston Aeros (2011-2012) ===
McKenzie joined the Houston Aeros after his trade to the club by the Charlotte Checkers midway through the 2011-12 season. The Aeros were the American Hockey League affiliate of the Minnesota Wild.

He made his Aeros debut on December 6, 2011, as McKenzie earned an assist on a goal by Joey Martin in a 6-1 win over the San Antonio Rampage. McKenzie would appear in 19 games with Houston during the season, scoring a goal and three points. Late in the season, McKenzie was assigned to the Ontario Reign of the ECHL. In five games with Ontario, McKenzie scored a goal.

On March 31, 2012, McKenzie announced his retirement.

== Coaching and management career ==
=== Kitchener Rangers (2012-present) ===
On June 7, 2012, McKenzie was hired by the Kitchener Rangers of the Ontario Hockey League as an assistant coach, working under head coach Steve Spott.

In his first season with the Rangers in 2012-13, Kitchener finished the year with a 39-20-9 record, earning 87 points and fourth place in the Western Conference. In the post-season, the Rangers lost to the London Knights in five games in the Western Conference semi-finals. Following the season, Spott stepped down from his position as head coach, and was replaced with Troy Smith. McKenzie remained on the staff as an assistant coach.

The Rangers struggled during the 2013-14 season, as the club began to rebuild. Kitchener missed the post-season, as the club finished in ninth place in the Western Conference with a 22-41-5 record, earning 49 points.

Kitchener saw some improvement in 2014-15, as the team earned a 32-26-10 record, finishing in sixth place in the Western Conference with 74 points, and returning to the post-season. The Rangers lost to the London Knights in the first round in six games. Following the season, the Rangers replaced head coach Troy Smith with Mike Van Ryn. McKenzie remained as an assistant coach, and was also named the assistant general manager.

The Rangers had a very successful season in 2015-16, as the club earned a 44-17-7 record, accumulating 95 points and a fourth place finish in the Western Conference. Kitchener made the second round of the playoffs, however, they were swept by the London Knights in four games. Following the season, Mike Van Ryn stepped down as head coach of the team, and was replaced by Jay McKee. McKenzie remained an assistant coach on the coaching staff.

Kitchener had another solid season in 2016-17, as the team had a record of 36-27-5, earning 77 points and sixth place in the Western Conference. The Rangers lost to the Owen Sound Attack in the first round of the post-season. Following this season, McKenzie was promoted to the position of general manager after Murray Hiebert stepped down.

In his first season as general manager in 2017-18, McKenzie made a number of trades, bringing in players such as Kole Sherwood, Logan Stanley, Logan Brown, Givani Smith, and Mario Culina, as Kitchener finished the regular season with a 43-21-4 record, earning 90 points and finishing first place in the Midwest Division for the first time since the 2007-08 season. In the post-season, the Rangers defeated the Guelph Storm and Sarnia Sting before matching up with the heavily favoured Sault Ste. Marie Greyhounds. The Rangers lost a memorable seven game series, as the Greyhounds scored in double overtime in game seven in the Western Conference finals to eliminate Kitchener from the post-season.

In 2018-19, the Rangers slid back in the standings, as the club finished the season with a 34-30-4 record, earning 72 points and fifth place in the Western Conference. In the post-season, the rebuilding club was swept by the Guelph Storm in the first round.

Prior to the 2019-20 season, McKenzie acquired goaltender Jacob Ingham from the Mississauga Steelheads to solidify the position. Also, due to the uncertainty of overage forward Joseph Garreffa returning to Kitchener for the season, McKenzie acquired overage forward Liam Hawel from the Guelph Storm, as the Rangers boasted three of the top overage players in the league, with Greg Meireles and Jonathan Yantsis as the other overage players on the club. The Rangers eventually traded Garreffa to the Ottawa 67's for draft picks. Kitchener drafted import defenseman and Arizona Coyotes prospect Axel Bergkvist at the 2019 CHL Import Draft to help out the blue line. The club got off to a slow start, posting a 7-10-2-2 record and sitting in last place through their first 21 games. On November 25, 2019, McKenzie relieved head coach Jay McKee of his duties and named himself as the interim head coach. In his first game as head coach of the Rangers on November 28, Kitchener defeated the Erie Otters 5-4 in a shootout, as McKenzie earned his first career OHL victory. Under McKenzie, Kitchener had a very impressive 33-6-3-0 record, as the team climbed from last place in the Midwest Division to finish the season with a 40-16-5-2 record, earning 87 points, and second place in the division. Due to the 2020 coronavirus pandemic in North America, the post-season was cancelled. On June 10, 2020, McKenzie announced that he would remain the head coach of the Rangers for the next season.

At the 2020 OHL Priority Selection, the Rangers selected twin brothers Andrew Leblanc and Jacob Leblanc in the first and third rounds respectively. At the 2020 CHL Import Draft, Kitchener selected goaltender Pavel Cajan from the Czech Republic. Due to COVID-19, the 2020-21 season was cancelled.

The Rangers selected Carson Rehkopf with their first selection of the 2021 OHL Priority Selection. During the 2021-22 season with Kitchener struggling, the club traded away defenseman Arber Xhekaj to the Hamilton Bulldogs for Navrin Mutter and five draft picks. Kitchener managed to earn a spot in the post-season, as they finished the season in seventh place in the Western Conference with a 30-31-5-2 record, earning 67 points. In the post-season, the Rangers upset the London Knights in the Western Conference quarter-finals, winning in seven games. In the conference semi-finals, Kitchener lost to the Windsor Spitfires.

On June 27, 2022, McKenzie stepped down as head coach of the team, as he shifted his focus to general manager duties. The next day, the Rangers announced that Chris Dennis as head coach.

The Rangers opened the 2022-23 expecting to be one of the top teams in the league. During the season, McKenzie made some trades, acquiring overage goaltender Marco Costantini from the Hamilton Bulldogs, Lleyton Moore from the Oshawa Generals, Francesco Arcuri from the Kingston Frontenacs and Danny Zhilkin from the Guelph Storm. Despite the moves and expecting to be contenders, the Rangers struggled to a 21-24-2-0 record, sitting in eighth place in the Western Conference. On February 10, McKenzie fired head coach Chris Dennis and announced that he would take over head coaching duties for the remainder of the season. Under McKenzie, the Rangers put together a solid 12-5-4-0, finishing in eighth place in the Western Conference, qualifying for the post-season. In their first round matchup, Kitchener defeated the heavily favoured and top seeded Windsor Spitfires in a four game sweep. The Rangers lost in the conference semi-finals to the London Knights in five games.

== Career statistics ==
			Regular season					Playoffs
Season	Team	League	GP	G	A	Pts	PIM	GP	G	A	Pts	PIM
2002–03	Oshawa Legionaires	OPJHL	47	19	17	36	26	12	5	6	11	28
2003–04	Oshawa Legionaires	OPJHL	6	2	2	4	24	—	—	—	—	—
2003–04	Bowmanville Eagles	OPJHL	12	2	4	6	20	14	3	7	10	37
2004–05	St. Michael's Buzzers	OPJHL	45	23	26	49	81	11	4	5	9	42
2005–06	St. Michael's Buzzers	OPJHL	40	39	38	77	110	25	13	19	32	60
2006–07	St. Lawrence Saints	ECAC	31	12	13	25	29	—	—	—	—	—
2007–08	St. Lawrence Saints	ECAC	34	7	13	20	34	—	—	—	—	—
2008–09	St. Lawrence Saints	ECAC	38	16	18	34	60	—	—	—	—	—
2009–10	St. Lawrence Saints	ECAC	41	14	21	35	60	—	—	—	—	—
2009–10	Albany River Rats	AHL	3	0	1	1	0	—	—	—	—	—
2010–11	Florida Everblades	ECHL	55	18	20	38	62	—	—	—	—	—
2010–11	Charlotte Checkers	AHL	14	1	0	1	4	—	—	—	—	—
2011–12	Florida Everblades	ECHL	19	5	10	15	22	—	—	—	—	—
2011–12	Ontario Reign	ECHL	5	1	0	1	0	—	—	—	—	—
2011–12	Houston Aeros	AHL	19	1	2	3	9	—	—	—	—	—
AHL totals			36	2	3	5	13	—	—	—	—	—
ECHL totals			79	20	34	54	84	—	—	—	—	—

== Coaching record ==
=== Ontario Hockey League ===
Team	Year	Regular season							Post season
Team	Year	G	W	L	OTL	SO	Pts	Finish	Result
Kitchener Rangers	2019–20	42	33	6	3	0	69	2nd in Midwest	Playoffs cancelled
Kitchener Rangers	2021–22	68	30	31	5	2	67	4th in Midwest	Won in conference quarter-finals (4-3 vs. LDN); Lost in conference semi-finals (1-4 vs. WSR)
Kitchener Rangers	2022–23	21	12	5	4	0	28	4th in Midwest	Won in conference quarter-finals (4-0 vs. WSR); Lost in conference semi-finals (1-4 vs. LDN)
OHL Total		131	75	42	12	2	164		0 J. Ross Robertson Cups (10-11, 0.476)

== Notable awards and honours ==
- 2007-2008: NCAA (ECAC) All-Academic Team
- 2008-2009: NCAA (ECAC) All-Academic Team
- 2010-2011: ECHL Rookie of the Month (December)
