= 2013 WCHA men's ice hockey tournament =

2013 WCHA Men's ice hockey tournament
- Dates: March 15–23, 2013
- Teams: 12
- Finals site: Xcel Energy Center; St. Paul, Minnesota
- Champions: Wisconsin (12th title)
- Winning coach: Mike Eaves (1st title)
- MVP: Nic Kerdiles (Wisconsin)
- WCHA Men's Ice Hockey Tournaments

The 2013 WCHA Men's Ice Hockey Tournament was the 54th conference playoff in league history and 59th season where a WCHA champion was crowned. The 2013 tournament was played between March 15 and March 23, 2013, at five conference arenas and the Xcel Energy Center in St. Paul, Minnesota. By winning the tournament, Wisconsin received the Broadmoor Trophy and was awarded the Western Collegiate Hockey Association's automatic bid to the 2013 NCAA Division I Men's Ice Hockey Tournament.

== Format ==
The first round of the postseason tournament features a best-of-three games format. All twelve conference teams participate in the tournament. Teams are seeded No. 1 through No. 12 according to their final conference standing, with a tiebreaker system used to seed teams with an identical number of points accumulated. The top six seeded teams each earn home ice and host one of the lower seeded teams.

The winners of the first round series advance to the Xcel Energy Center for the WCHA Final Five, the collective name for the quarterfinal, semifinal, and championship rounds. The Final Five uses a single-elimination format. Teams are re-seeded No. 1 through No. 6 according to the final regular season conference standings, with the top two teams automatically advancing to the semifinals. All Final Five games will be broadcast by Fox Sports North and carried by Root Sports Rocky Mountain and Fox College Sports Central.

=== Conference standings ===
Note: GP = Games played; W = Wins; L = Losses; T = Ties; PTS = Points; GF = Goals For; GA = Goals Against

2012–13 Western Collegiate Hockey Association standings
	Conference record							Overall record					
	GP	W	L	T	PTS	GF	GA	GP	W	L	T	GF	GA
#4 St. Cloud State †	28	18	9	1	37	94	66	42	25	16	1	141	103
#6 Minnesota †	28	16	7	5	37	94	65	40	26	9	5	139	80
#7 North Dakota	28	14	7	7	35	93	71	42	22	13	7	135	103
#12 Wisconsin *	28	13	8	7	33	69	64	42	22	13	7	112	89
#14 Denver	28	14	9	5	33	92	81	39	20	14	5	131	108
#13 Minnesota State	28	16	11	1	33	90	68	41	24	14	3	127	99
Omaha	28	14	12	2	30	92	91	39	19	18	2	127	117
Colorado College	28	11	13	4	26	88	98	42	18	19	5	133	141
Minnesota–Duluth	28	10	13	5	25	75	83	38	14	19	5	99	109
Michigan Tech	28	8	16	4	20	75	92	37	13	20	4	107	116
Bemidji State	28	5	16	7	17	58	87	36	6	22	8	74	110
Alaska–Anchorage	28	2	20	6	10	52	106	36	4	25	7	67	133
Championship: March 23, 2013 † indicates conference regular season champion; * indicates conference tournament champion Rankings: USCHO.com Top 20 Poll

== Bracket ==
Teams are reseeded after the first round

First round March 15–17
1	St. Cloud State	6	5	—
12	Alaska-Anchorage	1	1	—
2	Minnesota	2*	4	—
11	Bemidji State	1	3	—
3	North Dakota	5	1	6
10	Michigan Tech	3	2	0
4	Wisconsin	3	4	—
9	Minnesota Duluth	1	1	—
5	Denver	5	1	3
8	Colorado College	3	2	4
6	Minnesota State	4*	1	3
7	Nebraska-Omaha	3	2	1

Quarterfinals; March 21
4	Wisconsin	7
6	Minnesota State	2
3	North Dakota	3
8	Colorado College	4*

Semifinals; March 22
1	St. Cloud State	1
4	Wisconsin	4
2	Minnesota	0
8	Colorado College	2

Championship; March 23
4	Wisconsin	3
8	Colorado College	2

Note: * denotes overtime periods

== Results ==
=== First round ===
All times are local.

==== (1) St. Cloud State vs. (12) Alaska Anchorage ====
March 15	St. Cloud State	6–1	Alaska Anchorage	National Hockey Center	Recap
Garrett Milan (2) - (Morley, Benik) - 03:15; David Morley (10) - PP - (Hanowski, Benik) - 15:08		First period	04:24 - Scott Warner (3) - (Allen, Gellert)
Jonny Brodzinski (20) - (LeBlanc, Johnson) - 04:06; Joey Benik (3) - PP - (Morley, Prow) - 07:40; Jimmy Murray (5) - (Hanowski) - 19:21		Second period	No scoring
Jonny Brodzinski (21) - (unassisted) - 00:22		Third period	No scoring
Ryan Faragher ( 19 saves / 20 shots ) Joe Phillippi ( 3 saves / 3 shots )		Goalie stats	Rob Gunderson ( 26 saves / 32 shots )

March 16	St. Cloud State	5–1	Alaska Anchorage	National Hockey Center	Recap
Drew LeBlanc (13) - (Kossila) - 05:46		First period	No scoring
No scoring		Second period	No scoring
David Morley (11) - (Johnson, Milan) - 04:56; Nic Dowd (14) - PP - (Jensen, LeBlanc) - 09:13; Cory Thorson (10) - (Hanowski, Murray) - 13:20; Ben Hanowski (15) - EN - (Dowd, LeBlanc) - 18:47		Third period	05:58 - Blake Tatchell (9) - (Gellert, Docken)
Ryan Faragher ( 19 saves / 20 shots )		Goalie stats	Chris Kamal ( 41 saves / 45 shots )

St. Cloud State wins series 2 - 0

==== (2) Minnesota vs. (11) Bemidji State ====
March 15	Minnesota	2–1	OT	Bemidji State	Mariucci Arena	Recap
No scoring		First period		No scoring
Ben Marshall (6) - (Rau) - 14:14		Second period		No scoring
No scoring		Third period		19:22 - EA - Brance Orban (9) - (Illo, Jubinville)
Kyle Rau (15) - (Schmidt, Isackson) - 13:18		First overtime period		No scoring
Adam Wilcox ( 17 saves / 18 shots )		Goalie stats		Andrew Walsh ( 49 saves / 51 shots )

March 16	Minnesota	4–3	Bemidji State	Mariucci Arena	Recap
No scoring		First period	16:49 - PP - Jordan George (9) - (Kinne, Illo)
Nick Bjugstad (21) - (Rau, Haula) - PP - 15:33; Nate Condon (12) - (Haula, Budish) - 18:54		Second period	09:27 - Cory Ward (9) - (Rendle, Windle); 15:47 - Jeff Jubinville (6) - (Brewer, Orban)
A.J. Michaelson (3) - (Haula, Budish) - 07:38; Ben Marshall (8) - (unassisted) - 19:07		Third period	No scoring
Adam Wilcox ( 19 saves / 22 shots )		Goalie stats	Andrew Walsh ( 37 saves / 41 shots )

Minnesota wins series 2–0

==== (3) North Dakota vs. (10) Michigan Tech ====
March 15	North Dakota	5–3	Michigan Tech	Ralph Engelstad Arena	Recap
Michael Parks (7) - (Grimaldi) - 07:03; Dillon Simpson (4) - (Kristo, Knight) - PP - 18:07		First period	14:38 - PP - Ryan Furne (6) - (Petan, Khaira)
Derek Rodwell (2) - (unassisted) - 15:45		Second period	01:48 - Jacob Johnstone (2) - (Furne, Stebner)
Danny Kristo (22) - (Simpson, Gleason) - PP - 04:33; Danny Kristo (23) - (O'Donnell, Rowney) - 16:12		Third period	15:14 - Riley Sweeney (2) - (unassisted)
Zane Gothberg ( 31 saves / 34 shots )		Goalie stats	Jamie Phillips ( 19 saves / 24 shots )

March 16	North Dakota	1–2	Michigan Tech	Ralph Engelstad Arena	Recap
No scoring		First period	No scoring
No scoring		Second period	00:20 - Tanner Kero (11) - (Pietila)
Danny Kristo (24) - (Grimaldi) - 14:57		Third period	17:58 - C.J. Eick (3) - (Furne, Stebner)
Clarke Saunders ( 29 saves / 31 shots )		Goalie stats	Pheonix Copley ( 29 saves / 30 shots )

March 17	North Dakota	6–0	Michigan Tech	Ralph Engelstad Arena	Recap
Dillon Simpson (5) - (unassisted) - 12:13		First period	No scoring
Corban Knight (15) - (Kristo, Forbort) - 04:45; Carter Rowney (10) - (Grimaldi, MacWilliam) - 09:24; Mitch MacMillan (5) - (Gaarder, Forbort) - 13:54; Colton St. Clair (3) - (Gleason) - SH - 16:23		Second period	No scoring
Brendan O'Donnell (2) - (Knight, Kristo) - 16:45		Third period	No scoring
Clarke Saunders ( 27 saves / 27 shots ) Tate Maris ( 1 save / 1 shot )		Goalie stats	Pheonix Copley ( 38 saves / 44 shots )

North Dakota wins series 2 - 1

==== (4) Wisconsin vs. (9) Minnesota-Duluth ====
March 15	Wisconsin	3–1	Minnesota Duluth	Kohl Center	Recap
No scoring		First period	07:38 - Dan DeLisle (3) - (Herbert, Seidel)
Nic Kerdiles (7) - (Zengerle, Ramage) - 06:21; John Ramage (7) - (Kerdiles, Zengerle) - PP - 15:31		Second period	No scoring
Mark Zengerle (9) - (McCabe) - EA - 19:38		Third period	No scoring
Joel Rumpel ( 26 saves / 27 shots )		Goalie stats	Aaron Crandall ( 30 saves / 32 shots )

March 16	Wisconsin	4–1	Minnesota Duluth	Kohl Center	Recap
Jefferson Dahl (5) - (Little, Simonelli) - 02:48; Michael Mersch (23) - (LaBate, Wittchow) - 04:09; Kevin Schulze (4) - (Kerdiles, Barnes) - 07:53		First period	04:41 - Justin Crandall (7) - (Welinski, Herbert)
No scoring		Second period	No scoring
Tyler Barnes (11) - (Kerdiles, Zengerle) - 10:39		Third period	No scoring
Joel Rumpel ( 29 saves / 30 shots )		Goalie stats	Aaron Crandall ( 3 saves / 6 shots ) Matt McNeely ( 28 saves / 29 shots )

Wisconsin wins series 2–0

==== (5) Denver vs. (8) Colorado College ====
March 15	Denver	5–3	Colorado College	Magness Arena	Recap
Larkin Jacobson (5) - (Mayfield, Doremus) - 16:17; Quentin Shore (8) - (N. Shore, Zajac) - 17:46		First period	11:07 - Eamonn McDermott (3) - (Krushelnyski, Schwartz)
Shawn Ostrow (15) - (Knowlton, Mayfield) - PP - 08:46; Zac Larraza (12) - (Doremus, Tabrum) - 16:45		Second period	12:07 - Aaron Harstad (2) - (Taft, Krushelnyski)
Ty Loney (8) - (unassisted) - 08:51		Third period	07:00 - Alexander Krushelnyski (14) - (Schwartz)
Juho Olkinuora ( 39 saves / 42 shots )		Goalie stats	Joe Howe ( 34 saves / 39 shots )

March 16	Denver	1–2	Colorado College	Magness Arena	Recap
No scoring		First period	09:44 - Rylan Schwartz (16) - (Taft, Krushelnyski)
Quentin Shore (9) - (Knowlton, Brittain) - 00:33		Second period	05:58 - Archie Skalbeck (12) - (Hamburg, Winkler)
No scoring		Third period	No scoring
Sam Brittain ( 20 saves / 22 shots )		Goalie stats	Joe Howe ( 41 saves / 42 shots )

March 17	Denver	3–4	Colorado College	Magness Arena	Recap
Nick Shore (14) - (Loney, Zajac) - 12:34; Daniel Doremus (11) - (Makowski) - 13:54		First period	No scoring
No scoring		Second period	03:51 - Cody Bradley (4) - (Fejes, Hamburg); 06:55 - Hunter Fejes (7) - (Hamburg, Bradley); 08:56 - SH - Rylan Schwartz (17) - (unassisted)
David Makowski (9) - (N. Shore) - 03:39		Third period	09:49 - Charlie Taft (6) - (Schwartz)
Juho Olkinuora ( 22 saves / 26 shots )		Goalie stats	Joe Howe ( 37 saves / 40 shots )

Colorado College wins series 2 - 1

==== (6) Minnesota State vs. (7) Nebraska-Omaha ====
March 15	Minnesota State	4–3	OT	Nebraska-Omaha	Verizon Wireless Center	Recap
Zach Palmquist (6) - (Leitner, Nelson) - PP - 17:06		First period		05:16 - Brent Gwidt (8) - (Raubenheimer, Sustr)
Jean-Paul Lafontaine (9) - (Palmquist, Lehrke) - PP - 03:47		Second period		05:53 - Matt White (16) - (unassisted); 18:24 - PP - Ryan Walters (22) - (Sustr, Zombo)
Bryce Gervais (7) - (Lafontaine, Jutzi) - 09:39		Third period		No scoring
Chase Grant (7) - (Lafontaine, Elbrecht) - 07:04		First overtime period		No scoring
Stephon Williams ( 32 saves / 35 shots )		Goalie stats		John Faulkner ( 30 saves / 34 shots )

March 16	Minnesota State	1–2	Nebraska-Omaha	Verizon Wireless Center	Recap
Matt Leitner (16) - (Grant) - 10:46		First period	14:17 - Tanner Lane (3) - (Adams, Polk)
No scoring		Second period	No scoring
No scoring		Third period	05:21 - Dominic Zombo (11) - (O'Rourke, Megna)
Stephon Williams ( 25 saves / 27 shots )		Goalie stats	John Faulkner ( 34 saves / 35 shots )

March 17	Minnesota State	3–1	Nebraska-Omaha	Verizon Wireless Center	Recap
Bryce Gervais (8) - (Grant, Leitner) - 08:23		First period	No scoring
Max Gaede (1) - (Herndon, Lehrke) - 13:45		Second period	18:43 - Dominic Zombo (12) - (Archibald, Walters)
Matt Leitner (17) - (LaFontaine, Hayes) - PP - 04:30		Third period	No scoring
Stephon Williams ( 26 saves / 27 shots )		Goalie stats	John Faulkner ( 32 saves / 35 shots )

Minnesota State wins series 2 - 1

=== Quarterfinals ===
All times are local (UTC−5).

==== (4) Wisconsin vs. (6) Minnesota State ====
March 21	Wisconsin	7–2	Minnesota State	Xcel Energy Center	Recap
Tyler Barnes (12) - (unassisted) - 01:03; Jefferson Dahl (6) - (Little) - SH - 06:11; Nic Kerdiles (8) - (Zengerle, Ramage) - 08:11		First period	No scoring
Jefferson Dahl (7) - (McCabe) - SH - 08:50; Tyler Barnes (13) - (unassisted) - 12:24		Second period	10:53 - PP - Zach Palmquist (7) - (Lafontaine, Leitner); 13:51 - PP - Eriah Hayes (20) - (Lafontaine, Leitner)
Frankie Simonelli (3) - (Barnes, Kerdiles) - 11:05; Joseph LaBate (8) - (Woods, Mersch) - 17:16		Third period	No scoring
Joel Rumpel ( 38 saves / 40 shots )		Goalie stats	Stephon Williams ( 14 saves / 19 shots ) Phil Cook ( 6 saves / 8 shots )

==== (3) North Dakota vs. (8) Colorado College ====
March 21	North Dakota	3–4	OT	Colorado College	Xcel Energy Center	Recap
Drake Caggiula (7) - (Grimaldi, Rowney) - 14:23; Danny Kristo (25) - (O'Donnell) - 19:50		First period		03:06 - PP - Rylan Schwartz (18) - (Bradley, Rapuzzi)
No scoring		Second period		07:54 - SH - Alexander Krushelnyski (15) - (Schwartz)
Drake Caggiula (8) - (St. Clair, Pattyn) - 12:45		Third period		03:42 - Hunter Fejes (8) - (Hamburg)
No scoring		First overtime period		04:52 - Peter Stoykewych (2) - (Maric, Collett)
Clarke Saunders ( 19 saves / 23 shots )		Goalie stats		Joe Howe ( 29 saves / 32 shots )

=== Semifinals ===
All times are local (UTC−5).

==== (1) St. Cloud State vs. (4) Wisconsin ====
March 22	St. Cloud State	1–4	Wisconsin	Xcel Energy Center	Recap
Ben Hanowski (16) - (Dowd, Jensen) - PP - 14:29		First period	10:46 - Joseph LaBate (9) - (Woods, McCabe)
No scoring		Second period	02:08 - PP - John Ramage (8) - (Kerdiles, Woods)
No scoring		Third period	10:29 - PP - Nic Kerdiles (9) - (Ramage, LaBate); 18:49 - EN - Tyler Barnes (14) - (unassisted)
Ryan Faragher ( 17 saves / 21 shots )		Goalie stats	Joel Rumpel ( 30 saves / 31 shots )

==== (2) Minnesota vs. (8) Colorado College ====
March 22	Minnesota	0–2	Colorado College	Xcel Energy Center	Recap
No scoring		First period	No scoring
No scoring		Second period	00:59 - Rylan Schwartz (19) - (Stoykewych, McDermott); 04:24 - Charlie Taft (7) - (Krushelnyski)
No scoring		Third period	No scoring
Adam Wilcox ( 18 saves / 20 shots )		Goalie stats	Joe Howe ( 35 saves / 35 shots )

=== Championship ===
All times are local (UTC−5).

==== (4) Wisconsin vs. (8) Colorado College ====
March 23	Wisconsin	3–2	Colorado College	Xcel Energy Center	Recap
Tyler Barnes (15) - (Kerdiles, Simonelli) - 19:43		First period	No scoring
Sean Little (3) - (McCabe, Dahl) - 03:28; Nic Kerdiles (10) - (Ramage, Zengerle) - 16:15		Second period	07:19 - Charlie Taft (8) - (Schwartz); 19:32 - Rylan Schwartz (20) - (Krushennyski)
No scoring		Third period	No scoring
Joel Rumpel ( 20 saves / 22 shots )		Goalie stats	Joe Howe ( 30 saves / 33 shots )

== Tournament awards ==
=== All-Tournament Team ===
- F Tyler Barnes (Wisconsin)
- F Nic Kerdiles* (Wisconsin)
- F Rylan Schwartz (Colorado College)
- D John Ramage (Wisconsin)
- D Peter Stoykewych (Colorado College)
- G Joel Rumpel (Wisconsin)

* Most Valuable Player(s)
