= 2012–13 University of North Dakota men's ice hockey team =

2012–13 University of North Dakota men's ice hockey season
- Conference: 3rd WCHA
- Home ice: Ralph Engelstad Arena

Rankings
- USA Today/USA Hockey Magazine: #7
- USCHO.com/CBS College Sports: #7

Record
- Overall: 22–13–7
- Home: 11–4–6
- Road: 9–7–1
- Neutral: 2–2–0

Coaches and captains
- Head coach: Dave Hakstol
- Captain: Andrew MacWilliam

The University of North Dakota men's ice hockey team competed in the Western Collegiate Hockey Association.

== Season stats ==
=== Final record ===
Situation	Record
Overall	22–13–7
WCHA	14–7–7
Home	11–4–6
Away	9–7–1
Neutral	2–2–0
Exhibition	2–0–0

=== Standings ===
2012–13 Western Collegiate Hockey Association standings
	Conference record							Overall record					
	GP	W	L	T	PTS	GF	GA	GP	W	L	T	GF	GA
#4 St. Cloud State †	28	18	9	1	37	94	66	42	25	16	1	141	103
#6 Minnesota †	28	16	7	5	37	94	65	40	26	9	5	139	80
#7 North Dakota	28	14	7	7	35	93	71	42	22	13	7	135	103
#12 Wisconsin *	28	13	8	7	33	69	64	42	22	13	7	112	89
#14 Denver	28	14	9	5	33	92	81	39	20	14	5	131	108
#13 Minnesota State	28	16	11	1	33	90	68	41	24	14	3	127	99
Omaha	28	14	12	2	30	92	91	39	19	18	2	127	117
Colorado College	28	11	13	4	26	88	98	42	18	19	5	133	141
Minnesota–Duluth	28	10	13	5	25	75	83	38	14	19	5	99	109
Michigan Tech	28	8	16	4	20	75	92	37	13	20	4	107	116
Bemidji State	28	5	16	7	17	58	87	36	6	22	8	74	110
Alaska–Anchorage	28	2	20	6	10	52	106	36	4	25	7	67	133
Championship: March 23, 2013 † indicates conference regular season champion; * indicates conference tournament champion Rankings: USCHO.com Top 20 Poll

=== 2012–13 schedule and results ===
- Green background indicates regulation or overtime win.
- Red background indicates regulation or overtime loss.
- White background indicates tie or overtime tie.

#	Date	Visitor	Score	Home	OT	Decision	Attendance	WCHA	Overall	Notes
(EX)	October 6	University of Manitoba	3–5	#4 North Dakota		Saunders	10,477	0–0–0	0–0–0
(EX)	October 12	U.S. Under-18 Team	4–6	#4 North Dakota		Saunders	10,251	0–0–0	0–0–0
1†	October 19	#2 North Dakota	5–0	Alaska-Anchorage		Saunders	2,007	0–0–0	1–0–0	Brice Alaska Goal Rush (Fairbanks, AK)
2†	October 20	#2 North Dakota	1–2	Alaska-Fairbanks		Saunders	2,938	0–0–0	1–1–0	Brice Alaska Goal Rush (Fairbanks, AK)
3	October 26	Alaska-Anchorage	1–4	#4 North Dakota		Gothberg	11,446	1–0–0	2–1–0
4	October 27	Alaska-Anchorage	3–3	#4 North Dakota	OT	Saunders	11,581	1–0–1	2–1–1
5†	November 2	#12 Boston University	2–4	#6 North Dakota		Saunders	11,589	1–0–1	3–1–1
6†	November 3	#12 Boston University	4–2	#6 North Dakota		Gothberg	11,977	1–0–1	3–2–1
7	November 9	#6 North Dakota	3–0	St. Cloud State		Saunders	4,738	2–0–1	4–2–1
8	November 10	#6 North Dakota	2–5	St. Cloud State		Saunders	5,201	2–1–1	4–3–1
9	November 16	Minnesota-Duluth	4–4	#5 North Dakota	OT	Saunders	11,872	2–1–2	4–3–2
10	November 17	Minnesota-Duluth	3–4	#5 North Dakota	OT	Gothberg	11,918	3–1–2	5–3–2
11†	November 23	#7 North Dakota	2–1	#6 Notre Dame		Saunders	5,022	3–1–2	6–3–2
12†	November 24	#7 North Dakota	2–5	#6 Notre Dame		Gothberg	4,733	3–1–2	6–4–2
13	November 30	#8 North Dakota	3–5	#18 Colorado College		Saunders	6,695	3–2–2	6–5–2
14	December 1	#8 North Dakota	3–2	#18 Colorado College	OT	Saunders	7,021	4–2–2	7–5–2
15	December 7	#6 Denver	2–2	#9 North Dakota	OT	Saunders	11,717	4–2–3	7–5–3
16	December 8	#6 Denver	3–6	#9 North Dakota		Saunders	11,899	5–2–3	8–5–3
17	December 14	#8 North Dakota	6–1	Michigan Tech		Saunders	2,649	6–2–3	9–5–3
18	December 15	#8 North Dakota	4–1	Michigan Tech		Saunders	2,702	7–2–3	10–5–3
19†	January 4	#20 Holy Cross	2–5	#7 North Dakota		Saunders	10,741	7–2–3	11–5–3	Subway Holiday Classic
20†	January 5	#20 Holy Cross	2–3	#7 North Dakota		Saunders	11,587	7–2–3	12–5–3	Subway Holiday Classic
21	January 11	Colorado College	4–3	#7 North Dakota		Saunders	11,571	7–3–3	12–6–3
22	January 12	Colorado College	3–5	#7 North Dakota		Gothberg	11,915	8–3–3	13–6–3
23	January 18	#6 North Dakota	1–5	#1 Minnesota		Saunders	10,318	8–4–3	13–7–3
24	January 19	#6 North Dakota	4–4	#1 Minnesota	OT	Gothberg	10,256	8–4–4	13–7–4
25	January 25	#16 St. Cloud State	3–1	#5 North Dakota		Gothberg	11,821	8–5–4	13–8–4
26	January 26	#16 St. Cloud State	2–2	#5 North Dakota	OT	Saunders	11,937	8–5–5	13–8–5
27	February 1	#19 Wisconsin	1–1	#7 North Dakota	OT	Gothberg	11,864	8–5–6	13–8–6
28	February 2	#19 Wisconsin	1–4	#7 North Dakota		Gothberg	11,962	9–5–6	14–8–6
29	February 8	#7 North Dakota	2–1	#14 Nebraska-Omaha		Gothberg	9,487	10–5–6	15–8–6
30	February 9	#7 North Dakota	5–2	#14 Nebraska-Omaha		Gothberg	13,650	11–5–6	16–8–6	Mutual of Omaha Battles on Ice (TD Ameritrade Park Omaha)
31	February 22	#6 North Dakota	4–5	#10 Denver		Saunders	6,031	11–6–6	16–9–6
32	February 23	#6 North Dakota	6–1	#10 Denver		Saunders		12–6–6	17–9–6
33	March 1	Bemidji State	2–4	North Dakota		Saunders	11,944	13–6–6	18–9–6
34	March 2	Bemidji State	2–2	North Dakota	OT	Gothberg	12,177	13–6–7	18–9–7
35	March 8	#5 North Dakota	4–3	#10 MN-State Mankato		Gothberg	4,618	14–6–7	19–9–7
36	March 9	#5 North Dakota	1–2	#10 MN-State Mankato	OT	Gothberg	5,088	14–7–7	19–10–7
37	March 15	Michigan Tech	3–5	#4 North Dakota		Gothberg	10,571	15–7–7	20–10–7	WCHA First Round
38	March 16	Michigan Tech	2–1	#4 North Dakota		Saunders	10,953	15–8–7	20–11–7	WCHA First Round
39	March 17	Michigan Tech	0–6	#4 North Dakota		Saunders	10,384	16–8–7	21–11–7	WCHA First Round
40	March 21	Colorado College	4–3	#6 North Dakota	OT	Saunders	17,038	16–9–7	21–12–7	WCHA Final Five, Xcel Energy Center, St. Paul, MN
41†	March 29	#14 Niagara	1–2	#7 North Dakota		Gothberg	2,289	16–9–7	22–12–7	NCAA West Regionals (Grand Rapids, MI)
42†	March 30	#15 Yale	4–1	#7 North Dakota		Saunders	1,918	16–9–7	22–13–7	NCAA West Regionals (Grand Rapids, MI)

Notes:

(EX) Denotes an exhibition game

† Denotes a non-conference game

== Player statistics ==
Final Stats

=== Skaters ===
Note: Pos = Position; GP = Games played; G = Goals; A = Assists; Pts = Points; PIM = Penalty minutes; +/- = Plus/minus; PPG = Power-play goals; SHG = Short-handed goals; GWG = Game-winning goals

Regular season
Player	GP	G	A	Pts	+/-	PIM
Danny Kristo	40	26	26	52	17	24
Corban Knight	41	16	33	49	16	40
Rocco Grimaldi	40	13	23	36	14	18
Carter Rowney	41	10	17	27	5	10
Mark MacMillan	42	13	12	25	10	28
Dillon Simpson	42	5	19	24	4	12
Joe Gleason	41	5	13	18	3	18
Derek Forbort	42	4	13	17	11	26
Drake Caggiula	39	8	8	16	9	31
Nick Mattson	38	3	12	15	9	8
Andrew MacWilliam	41	2	11	13	13	116
Jordan Schmaltz	42	3	9	12	8	31
Connor Gaarder	34	4	7	11	2	12
Brendan O'Donnell	29	2	8	10	0	20
Michael Parks	25	7	1	8	−4	31
Mitch MacMillan	20	5	2	7	3	4
Colten St. Clair	40	3	4	7	2	32
Stephane Pattyn	41	2	2	4	−2	60
Derek Rodwell	32	2	1	3	0	34
Bryn Chyzyk	13	1	2	3	1	10
Dan Senkbeil	19	1	1	2	−2	35
Zane Gothberg	17	0	2	4	0	2
Andrew Panzarella	7	0	0	0	−1	6
Colten Sanderson	2	0	0	0	0	0
Matt Carey	2	1	0	1	−1	2
David Rundblad^{†}	5	0	0	0	−1	0
Brad Mills	3	0	0	0	−1	0
Teuvo Teravainen	3	0	0	0	0	0
Totals	42	135	226	361	118	614
