= 2012–13 Yale Bulldogs men's ice hockey season =

College ice hockey season

NCAA Division I champion 2013 NCAA Tournament, champion
- Conference: 3rd ECAC Hockey
- Home ice: Ingalls Rink

Rankings
- USCHO: 1
- USA Today: 1

Record
- Overall: 22–12–3
- Conference: 12–9–1
- Home: 10–3–1
- Road: 7–7–1
- Neutral: 5–2–1

Coaches and captains
- Head coach: Keith Allain
- Assistant coaches: Red Gendron; Dan Muse
- Captain: Andrew Miller

The 2012–13 Yale Bulldogs men's ice hockey team represented Yale University in the 2012–13 NCAA Division I men's ice hockey season. The Bulldogs were coached by Keith Allain who was in his seventh season as head coach. His assistant coaches were Red Gendron and Dan Muse. The Bulldogs played their home games in Ingalls Rink and competed in the ECAC Hockey conference.

The Bulldogs posted a regular season record of 16 wins, 10 losses, and 3 ties. They were seeded third for the 2013 ECAC Hockey men's ice hockey tournament, winning their quarterfinal series, but losing in the semifinals to eventual champion Union. Yale was invited to the 2013 NCAA Division I men's ice hockey tournament as the tournament's 15th overall seed out of 16 teams, and the 4th seed in the west regional. In their first game in Grand Rapids, Michigan, the Bulldogs defeated Minnesota, 3–2, on a Jesse Root goal 9 seconds into overtime. In the second round against North Dakota, Yale trailed most of the game, before netting 4 goals in the final 8 minutes to win 4–1 and advance to the school's first Frozen Four since 1952.

In the Frozen Four at Consol Energy Center in Pittsburgh, the Bulldogs scored 2 goals in the first period against UMass Lowell, before the River Hawks answered with 2 goals in the second. After a scoreless third period, captain Andrew Miller scored 6:59 into overtime to send the Bulldogs to the national championship against Quinnipiac, setting up an all-ECAC and all-Connecticut matchup. In the final, goaltender Jeff Malcolm stopped all 36 Quinnipiac shots, and the Bulldogs scored 4 to win their first national championship.

== 2012–13 Roster ==
As of March 31, 2013.

Goaltenders
| # | State | Player | Catches | Year | Hometown | Previous Team |
| 29 | (North Carolina) | Connor Wilson | L | Sophomore | Cary, North Carolina | Chicago (USHL) |
| 31 | (California) | Nick Maricic | L | Senior | Alta Loma, California | Tri-City (USHL) |
| 33 | (Alberta) | Jeff Malcolm | L | Senior | Lethbridge, Alberta | Quesnel (BCHL) |

Defensemen
| # | State | Player | Shoots | Year | Hometown | Previous Team |
| 2 | (Massachusetts) | Gus Young | | Junior | Dedham, Massachusetts | Noble and Greenough School (USHS-MA) |
| 4 | (New York (state)) | Rob O'Gara | | Freshman | Nesconset, New York | Milton Academy (USHS-MA) |
| 7 | (New Jersey) | Matt Killian | | Sophomore | Basking Ridge, New Jersey | Delbarton (USHS-NJ) |
| 10 | (Illinois) | Mitch Witek | | Freshman | Downers Grove, Illinois | Waterloo (USHL) |
| 14 | (Michigan) | Ryan Obuchowski | | Freshman | West Bloomfield, Michigan | Indiana (USHL) |
| 21 | (Alberta) | Colin Dueck | | Senior | Calgary, Alberta | Nanaimo (BCHL) |
| 22 | (Minnesota) | Tommy Fallen | | Sophomore | Plymouth, Minnesota | Cedar Rapids (USHL) |

Forwards
| # | State | Player | Shoots | Year | Hometown | Previous Team |
| 6 | (New York (state)) | Stu Wilson | | Freshman | Pittsford, New York | Cedar Rapids (USHL) |
| 8 | (Illinois) | Josh Balch | | Senior | Wilmette, Illinois | Des Moines (USHL); Chicago (USHL) |
| 9 | (Alberta) | Carson Cooper | | Freshman | Bow Island, Alberta | Ft. McMurray (AJHL) |
| 11 | (Florida) | Trent Ruffolo | | Sophomore | Coral Springs, Florida | New Hampshire (EJHL) |
| 12 | (New Hampshire) | Cody Learned | | Freshman | Amherst, New Hampshire | Boston (EJHL) |
| 13 | (New Jersey) | Matthew Beattie | | Freshman | Whitehouse Station, New Jersey | Phillips Exeter (USHS-NH) |
| 15 | (Michigan) | Clinton Bourbonais | | Junior | Dexter, Michigan | St. Mary's Preparatory (USHS-MI) |
| 16 | (Vermont) | Alex Ward | | Sophomore | Burlington, Vermont | Deerfield (USHS-MA) |
| 17 | (Michigan) | Andrew Miller | | Senior | Bloomfield Hills, Michigan | Chicago (USHL) |
| 18 | (New Jersey) | Kenny Agostino | | Junior | Flanders, New Jersey | Delbarton School (USHS-NJ) |
| 19 | (New Hampshire) | Anthony Day | | Sophomore | Buffalo, New York | Waterloo (EJHL) |
| 20 | (Pennsylvania) | Jesse Root | | Junior | Pittsburgh, Pennsylvania | Taft School (USHS-CT) |
| 26 | (Norway) | Nicholas Weberg | | Sophomore | Oslo, Norway | Shattuck-Saint Mary's School (USHS-MN) |
| 27 | (New Jersey) | Charles Orzetti | | Freshman | Wyckoff, New Jersey | Surrey (BCHL) |
| 28 | (Quebec) | Antoine Laganière | | Senior | L'Île-Cadieux, Quebec | Deerfield (USHS-MA) |

== Standings ==
2012–13 ECAC Hockey standings
| | Conference record | | | | | | | Overall record | | | | | |
| | GP | W | L | T | PTS | GF | GA | GP | W | L | T | GF | GA |
|---|---|---|---|---|---|---|---|---|---|---|---|---|---|
| #2 Quinnipiac † | 22 | 17 | 2 | 3 | 37 | 73 | 32 | 43 | 30 | 8 | 5 | 130 | 72 |
| Rensselaer | 22 | 12 | 7 | 3 | 27 | 61 | 49 | 37 | 18 | 14 | 5 | 106 | 88 |
| #1 Yale | 22 | 12 | 9 | 1 | 25 | 60 | 62 | 37 | 22 | 12 | 3 | 107 | 96 |
| #10 Union * | 22 | 10 | 8 | 4 | 24 | 64 | 52 | 40 | 22 | 13 | 5 | 123 | 85 |
| Dartmouth | 22 | 9 | 9 | 4 | 22 | 56 | 57 | 34 | 15 | 14 | 5 | 94 | 88 |
| St. Lawrence | 22 | 9 | 9 | 4 | 22 | 60 | 68 | 38 | 18 | 16 | 4 | 107 | 109 |
| Brown | 22 | 7 | 9 | 6 | 20 | 54 | 51 | 36 | 16 | 14 | 6 | 90 | 85 |
| Princeton | 22 | 8 | 10 | 4 | 20 | 52 | 60 | 31 | 10 | 16 | 5 | 72 | 89 |
| Cornell | 22 | 8 | 11 | 3 | 19 | 49 | 55 | 34 | 15 | 16 | 3 | 83 | 91 |
| Clarkson | 22 | 8 | 11 | 3 | 19 | 58 | 67 | 36 | 9 | 20 | 7 | 89 | 113 |
| Colgate | 22 | 6 | 13 | 3 | 15 | 52 | 66 | 36 | 14 | 18 | 4 | 109 | 102 |
| Harvard | 22 | 6 | 14 | 2 | 14 | 45 | 65 | 32 | 10 | 19 | 3 | 73 | 101 |
Championship: March 23, 2013 † indicates conference regular season champion (Cleary Cup) * indicates conference tournament champion (Whitelaw Cup); Rankings: USCHO.com Top 20 Poll

== Schedule ==
| Date | Time | Opponent^{#} | Rank^{#} | Site | TV | Decision | Result | Attendance | Record |
Exhibition
| December 28 | 7:00 pm | Russian Red Stars* | | Ingalls Rink • New Haven, CT | | Malcolm | W 10–2 | 3,500 | 7–3–2 (3–3–1) |

Regular season
| Game | Date | Opponent | Score | Location | Attendance | Decision | Conference | Overall |
|---|---|---|---|---|---|---|---|---|
| 1* | October 26 | vs. Dartmouth | T, 2–2 (OT) | Meehan Auditorium • Providence, Rhode Island (Ivy Shootout) | 1,219 | Maricic | — | 0–0–1 |
| 2* | October 27 | vs. Princeton | W, 3–2 | Meehan Auditorium • Providence, Rhode Island (Ivy Shootout) | 1,046 | Malcolm | — | 1–0–1 |
| 3 | November 2 | at Dartmouth | L, 4–7 | Thompson Arena • Hanover, New Hampshire | 3,021 | Maricic | 0–1–0 | 1–1–1 |
| 4 | November 3 | at Harvard | W, 5–1 | Bright Hockey Center • Boston, Massachusetts | 2,726 | Malcolm | 1–1–0 | 2–1–1 |
| 5 | November 9 | Clarkson | L, 0–1 | Ingalls Rink • New Haven, Connecticut | 3,274 | Malcolm | 1–2–0 | 2–2–1 |
| 6 | November 10 | St. Lawrence | W, 4–2 | Ingalls Rink • New Haven, Connecticut | 3,500 | Malcolm | 2–2–0 | 3–2–1 |
| 7* | November 23 | at Denver | W, 2–1 (OT) | Magness Arena • Denver, Colorado | 4,766 | Malcolm | 2–2–0 | 4–2–1 |
| 8* | November 24 | at Colorado College | W, 6–5 (OT) | Colorado Springs World Arena • Colorado Springs, Colorado | 6,654 | Maricic | 2–2–0 | 5–2–1 |
| 9 | December 1 | Brown | W, 4–3 | Ingalls Rink • New Haven, Connecticut | 3,500 | Malcolm | 3–2–0 | 6–2–1 |
| 10 | December 7 | RPI | L, 1–6 | Ingalls Rink • New Haven, Connecticut | 3,137 | Malcolm | 3–3–0 | 6–3–1 |
| 11 | December 8 | Union | T, 2–2 (OT) | Ingalls Rink • New Haven, Connecticut | 3,500 | Malcolm | 3–3–1 | 6–3–2 |
| 12* | December 11 | Massachusetts | W, 4–2 | Ingalls Rink • New Haven, Connecticut | 2,865 | Malcolm | 3–3–1 | 7–3–2 |
| 13* | December 30 | at Holy Cross | L, 4–5 | New England Sports Center • Worcester, Massachusetts | 1,406 | Malcolm | 3–3–1 | 7–4–2 |
| 14* | January 4 | at Boston College | T, 3–3 (OT) | Conte Forum • Chestnut Hill, Massachusetts | 7,213 | Malcolm | 3–3–1 | 7–4–3 |
| 15 | January 11 | at St. Lawrence | W, 5–3 | Appleton Arena • Canton, New York | 1,120 | Malcolm | 4–3–1 | 8–4–3 |
| 16 | January 12 | at Clarkson | W, 3–1 | Cheel Arena • Potsdam, New York | 2,297 | Malcolm | 5–3–1 | 9–4–3 |
| 17 | January 18 | Harvard | W, 4–0 | Ingalls Rink • New Haven, Connecticut | 3,500 | Malcolm | 6–3–1 | 10–4–3 |
| 18 | January 19 | Dartmouth | W, 4–2 | Ingalls Rink • New Haven, Connecticut | 3,500 | Malcolm | 7–3–1 | 11–4–3 |
| 19 | January 25 | at Cornell | W, 3–2 (OT) | Lynah Rink • Ithaca, New York | 4,267 | Malcolm | 8–3–1 | 12–4–3 |
| 20 | January 26 | at Colgate | L, 1–4 | Starr Rink • Hamilton, New York | 1,962 | Malcolm | 8–4–1 | 12–5–3 |
| 21 | February 1 | Princeton | W, 4–2 | Ingalls Rink • New Haven, Connecticut | 3,500 | Maricic | 9–4–1 | 13–5–3 |
| 22 | February 2 | Quinnipiac | L, 2–6 | Ingalls Rink • New Haven, Connecticut | 3,500 | Maricic | 9–5–1 | 13–6–3 |
| 23 | February 12 | at Brown | L, 0–1 | Meehan Auditorium • Providence, Rhode Island | 1,205 | Maricic | 9–6–1 | 13–7–3 |
| 24 | February 15 | at Union | L, 2–4 | Achilles Center • Schenectady, New York | 2,085 | Wilson | 9–7–1 | 13–8–3 |
| 25 | February 16 | at RPI | L, 1–4 | Houston Field House • Troy, New York | 4,113 | Wilson | 9–8–1 | 13–9–3 |
| 26 | February 22 | at Quinnipiac | L, 1–4 | TD Bank Sports Center • Hamden, Connecticut | 4,074 | Wilson | 9–9–1 | 13–10–3 |
| 27 | February 23 | at Princeton | W, 4–3 | Hobey Baker Rink • Princeton, New Jersey | 2,374 | Malcolm | 10–9–1 | 14–10–3 |
| 28 | March 1 | Colgate | W, 4–3 (OT) | Ingalls Rink • New Haven, Connecticut | 3,500 | Malcolm | 11–9–1 | 15–10–3 |
| 29 | March 2 | Cornell | W, 2–1 | Ingalls Rink • New Haven, Connecticut | 3,500 | Malcolm | 12–9–1 | 16–10–3 |

*Non-conference game

=== Postseason ===
2013 ECAC Tournament
| Game | Date | Opponent | Score | Location | Attendance | Decision | Overall |
|---|---|---|---|---|---|---|---|
| 1 | March 15 | St. Lawrence | W, 6–1 | Ingalls Rink • New Haven, Connecticut (Quarterfinals) | 2,413 | Malcolm | 17–10–3 |
| 2 | March 16 | St. Lawrence | W, 3–0 | Ingalls Rink • New Haven, Connecticut (Quarterfinals) | 2,833 | Malcolm | 18–10–3 |
| 3 | March 22 | Union | L, 0–5 | Boardwalk Hall • Atlantic City, New Jersey (Semifinals) | 3,145 | Malcolm | 18–11–3 |
| 4 | March 23 | Quinnipiac | L, 0–3 | Boardwalk Hall • Atlantic City, New Jersey (Third-place game) | 4,017 | Malcolm | 18–12–3 |

2013 NCAA Tournament
| Game | Date | Opponent | Score | Location | Attendance | Decision | Overall |
|---|---|---|---|---|---|---|---|
| 1 | March 29 | Minnesota | W, 3–2 (OT) | Van Andel Arena • Grand Rapids, Michigan (West Regional semifinal) | 2,289 | Malcolm | 19–12–3 |
| 2 | March 30 | North Dakota | W, 4–1 | Van Andel Arena • Grand Rapids, Michigan (West Regional Final) | 1,918 | Malcolm | 20–12–3 |
| 3 | April 11 | UMass Lowell | W, 3–2 | Consol Energy Center • Pittsburgh, Pennsylvania (National semifinal) | 17,428 | Malcolm | 21–12–3 |
| 4 | April 13 | Quinnipiac | W, 4–0 | Consol Energy Center • Pittsburgh, Pennsylvania (National Final) | 18,184 | Malcolm | 22–12–3 |

== 2013 national championship ==
| April 13, 2013; 7:00 pm ESPN | (W4) Yale | 4 – 0 (0–0, 1–0, 3–0) | (E1) Quinnipiac | Consol Energy Center, Pittsburgh; Attendance: 18,184 |

Game reference
| Referees: Jeff Bunyon; Kevin Shea; Linesmen: Bob Bernard; Tommy George |

Scoring summary
| Period | Team | Goal | Assist(s) | Time | Score |
|---|---|---|---|---|---|
| 1st | None | | | | |
| 2nd | Yale | Clinton Bourbonais (4) | Young | 39:56 | 1–0 Yale |
| 3rd | Yale | Charles Orzetti (2) | Bourbonais and Laganière | 43:35 | 2–0 Yale |
| 3rd | Yale | Andrew Miller (18) | Agostino | 49:06 | 3–0 Yale |
| 3rd | Yale | Jesse Root (12) – EN | Miller and O'Gara | 53:02 | 4–0 Yale |
Penalty summary
| Period | Team | Player | Penalty | Time | PIM |
| 1st | Yale | Rob O'Gara | Elbowing | 02:41 | 2:00 |
| 1st | QUI | Cory Hibbeler | Interference | 04:51 | 2:00 |
| 1st | Yale | Colin Dueck | Tripping | 07:48 | 2:00 |
| 1st | QUI | Mike Dalhuisen | Tripping | 15:23 | 2:00 |
| 2nd | QUI | Jeremy Langlois | Roughing | 27:17 | 2:00 |
| 2nd | Yale | Bench (Served by Anthony Day) | Too Many Players | 30:28 | 2:00 |
| 2nd | Yale | Clinton Bourbonais | Charging | 31:25 | 2:00 |
| 2nd | QUI | Bench (Served by Russell Goodman) | Too Many Players | 32:38 | 2:00 |
| 2nd | QUI | Zach Davies | Interference | 33:25 | 2:00 |
| 3rd | Yale | Antoine Laganière | Slashing | 51:37 | 2:00 |
| 3rd | QUI | Travis St. Denis | Slashing | 51:37 | 2:00 |

Shots by period
| Team | 1 | 2 | 3 | T |
|---|---|---|---|---|
| Yale | 9 | 14 | 8 | 31 |
| Quinnipiac | 11 | 15 | 10 | 36 |

Goaltenders
| Team | Name | Saves | Goals against | Time on ice |
|---|---|---|---|---|
| Yale | Jeff Malcolm | 36 | 0 | 60:00 |
| QUI | Eric Hartzell | 27 | 3 | 59:24 |

== Player stats ==
=== Skaters ===
| Name | Games | Goals | Assists | Points | PIM |
|---|---|---|---|---|---|
| Andrew Miller | 37 | 18 | 23 | 41 | 8 |
| Kenny Agostino | 37 | 17 | 24 | 41 | 32 |
| Antoine Laganière | 37 | 15 | 14 | 29 | 58 |
| Jesse Root | 34 | 12 | 11 | 23 | 24 |
| Tommy Fallen | 37 | 7 | 16 | 23 | 18 |
| Stu Wilson | 37 | 9 | 8 | 17 | 0 |
| Clinton Bourbonais | 36 | 4 | 13 | 17 | 64 |
| Trent Ruffolo | 34 | 7 | 6 | 13 | 4 |
| Ryan Obuchowski | 37 | 3 | 9 | 12 | 16 |
| Nicholas Weberg | 24 | 4 | 7 | 11 | 0 |
| Gus Young | 37 | 2 | 7 | 9 | 58 |
| Josh Balch | 37 | 3 | 5 | 8 | 20 |
| Rob O'Gara | 37 | 0 | 7 | 7 | 32 |
| Carson Cooper | 37 | 1 | 5 | 6 | 29 |
| Colin Dueck | 37 | 1 | 5 | 6 | 30 |
| Matt Killian | 22 | 0 | 6 | 6 | 0 |
| Anthony Day | 37 | 1 | 4 | 5 | 10 |
| Mitch Witek | 23 | 1 | 3 | 4 | 2 |
| Charles Orzetti | 19 | 2 | 1 | 3 | 16 |
| Nick Maricic | 9 | 0 | 0 | 0 | 0 |
| Cody Learned | 8 | 0 | 0 | 0 | 15 |
| Alex Ward | 7 | 0 | 0 | 0 | 6 |
| Matthew Beattie | 15 | 0 | 0 | 0 | 8 |
| Connor Wilson | 5 | 0 | 0 | 0 | 0 |
| Jeff Malcolm | 30 | 0 | 0 | 0 | 0 |
| Team | 37 | 107 | 174 | 281 | 450 |

=== Goaltenders ===
| Name | Games | Minutes | Wins | Losses | Ties | Goals against | GAA | Shots | Saves | SV % | Shut outs |
|---|---|---|---|---|---|---|---|---|---|---|---|
| Jeff Malcolm | 30 | 1711 | 20 | 6 | 2 | 64 | 2.24 | 793 | 729 | .919 | 3 |
| Nick Maricic | 9 | 402 | 2 | 3 | 1 | 19 | 2.84 | 200 | 181 | .905 | 0 |
| Connor Wilson | 5 | 137 | 0 | 3 | 0 | 11 | 4.82 | 73 | 62 | .849 | 0 |

== Rankings ==
| Poll | Week | | | | | | | | | | | | | | | | | | | | | | | | | | |
| Poll | Pre | 1 | 2 | 3 | 4 | 5 | 6 | 7 | 8 | 9 | 10 | 11 | 12 | 13 | 14 | 15 | 16 | 17 | 18 | 19 | 20 | 21 | 22 | 23 | 24 | 25 | 26 (Final) |
|---|---|---|---|---|---|---|---|---|---|---|---|---|---|---|---|---|---|---|---|---|---|---|---|---|---|---|---|
| USCHO.com | NR | NR | NR | NR | NR | NR | NR | NR | 15 | 15 | 15 | 15 | 17 | 14 | 12 | 8 | 8 | 10 | 10 | 13 | 15 | 13 | 13 | 11 | 15 | - | 1 (47) |
| USA Today | NR | NR | NR | NR | NR | NR | NR | NR | 13 | 15 | 15 | 14 | NR | 14 | 12 | 7 | 7 | 9 | 9 | 14 | 14 | 13 | 13 | 10 | 15 | 4 | 1 (34) |

Note: USCHO did not release a poll in week 25.

== Players drafted into the NHL ==
=== 2013 NHL entry draft ===
| = NHL All-Star team | = NHL All-Star | = NHL All-Star and NHL All-Star team | = Did not play in the NHL |

| Round | Pick | Player | NHL team |
|---|---|---|---|
| 3 | 74 | John Hayden^{†} | Chicago Blackhawks |

† incoming freshman
