= 2012–13 Alabama–Huntsville Chargers men's ice hockey season =

American college ice hockey team season

2012–13 Alabama–Huntsville Chargers men's ice hockey
- Conference: Independent
- Record: 3–21–1
- Head coach: Kurt Kleinendorst (1st season)
- Assistant coaches: Bruce Garber; Gavin Morgan
- Captain: Curtis deBruyn
- Alternate captain: Sebastian Geoffrion
- Home stadium: Propst Arena

The 2012–13 Alabama–Huntsville Chargers ice hockey team represented the University of Alabama in Huntsville in the 2012–13 NCAA Division I men's ice hockey season. The Chargers were coached by Kurt Kleinendorst who was in his first season as head coach. His assistant coaches were Gavin Morgan and Tim Flynn. The Chargers played their home games in the Propst Arena at the Von Braun Center and compete as an independent.

On September 25, 2012, only 11 days before the season began, former New Jersey Devils assistant coach and U.S. Under-18 head coach Kurt Kleinendorst was announced as head coach, replacing Chris Luongo.

On January 17, 2013, after months of discussions with conference officials and league member representatives, UAH formally applied to and was accepted to join the Western Collegiate Hockey Association beginning with the 2013-14 season.

== Recruiting ==
UAH added 8 freshmen for the 2012–13 season, including 1 goalie, 3 forwards and 4 defensemen:

Player	Position	Nationality	Notes
Chad Brears	Forward	Canada	Cold Lake, Alberta
Gregg Greuhl	Goalie	United States	Mayfield Heights, Ohio
Steven Hickey	Forward	United States	New Haven, Connecticut
Jamie Kendra	Forward	Canada	Markham, Ontario; former Markham Waxers captain
Steven Koshey	Defenseman	Canada	Trail, British Columbia
Frank Misuraca	Defenseman	United States	Detroit, Michigan
Jack Prince	Defenseman	United Kingdom	Leicester, United Kingdom
Anderson White	Defenseman	Canada	Caledon, Ontario

== Roster ==
=== Departures from 2011–12 team ===
- Tom Durnie, D, graduated
- Andrew Creppin, F
- Jamie Easton, F, graduated
- Nickolas Gatt, D, transferred to Michigan State
- Mac Roy, F, transferred to Robert Morris
- Clarke Saunders, G, transferred to North Dakota

=== 2012–13 team ===
As of August 30, 2012.

No.	Nat.	Player	Class	Pos	Height	Weight	DoB	Hometown	Previous team	NHL rights
2		Graeme Strukoff	Sophomore	D	6' 0" (1.83 m)	190 lb (86 kg)	1991-03-30	Chilliwack, British Columbia	Victoria (BCHL)	—
3		Anderson White	Freshman	D	6' 4" (1.93 m)	200 lb (91 kg)	1991-08-16	Caledon, Ontario	Chilliwack (BCHL)	—
4		Frank Misuraca	Freshman	D	5' 11" (1.8 m)	195 lb (88 kg)	1991-09-06	Clinton Township, Michigan	Corpus Christi (NAHL)	—
5		Brice Geoffrion	Junior	F	6' 0" (1.83 m)	190 lb (86 kg)	1990-11-04	Brentwood, Tennessee	Motor City (NAHL)	—
7		Jamie Kendra	Freshman	F	5' 10" (1.78 m)	195 lb (88 kg)	1992-02-25	Markham, Ontario	Markham (OJHL)	—
8		Alex Allan	Junior	F	5' 11" (1.8 m)	185 lb (84 kg)	1989-08-28	Calgary, Alberta	Victoria (BCHL)	—
9		Chad Brears	Freshman	F	6' 0" (1.83 m)	175 lb (79 kg)	1991-05-08	Ottawa, Ontario	Merritt (BCHL)	—
10		Mat Hagen	Junior	D	6' 0" (1.83 m)	185 lb (84 kg)	1989-12-27	Ottawa, Ontario	Kanata (CJHL)	—
11		Jack Prince	Freshman	F	6' 1" (1.85 m)	200 lb (91 kg)	1991-02-14	London, England	Texas (NAHL)	—
13		Michael Webley	Sophomore	F	6' 0" (1.83 m)	190 lb (86 kg)	1990-10-13	Stittsville, Ontario	Gloucester (CCHL)	—
14		Stephen Hickley	Freshman	D	6' 3" (1.91 m)	185 lb (84 kg)	1991-09-25	Ancaster, Ontario	Oakville (OJHL)	—
15		Tyler Kotlarz	Sophomore	F	6' 0" (1.83 m)	190 lb (86 kg)	1990-11-03	Hudsonville, Michigan	Markham (OJHL)	—
16		Doug Reid	Sophomore	F	6' 0" (1.83 m)	200 lb (91 kg)	1990-03-20	Innisfil, Ontario	Markham (OJHL)	—
19		Craig Pierce	Sophomore	F	5' 11" (1.8 m)	185 lb (84 kg)	1990-10-18	Roswell, Georgia	Rochester (EJHL)	—
20		Lasse Uusivirta	Junior	D	6' 1" (1.85 m)	185 lb (84 kg)	1989-07-27	Espoo, Finland	Blues U20 (Jr. A SM-liiga)	—
21		Jeff Vanderlugt	Sophomore	F	6' 3" (1.91 m)	220 lb (100 kg)	1990-05-12	Richmond Hill, Ontario	Surrey (BCHL)	—
22		Sebastian Geoffrion (A)	Senior	F	5' 10" (1.78 m)	190 lb (86 kg)	1989-07-26	Brentwood, Tennessee	Lincoln (USHL)	—
23		Curtis deBruyn (C)	Senior	D	5' 10" (1.78 m)	180 lb (82 kg)	1988-10-07	Calgary, Alberta	Olds (AJHL)	—
24		Steven Koshey	Freshman	D	5' 9" (1.75 m)	190 lb (86 kg)	1991-03-27	Trail, British Columbia	Surrey (BCHL)	—
26		Justin Cseter	Senior	F	5' 10" (1.78 m)	180 lb (82 kg)	1988-08-24	Menominee, Wisconsin	Salmon Arm (BCHL)	—
27		Kyle Lysaght	Sophomore	F	6' 0" (1.83 m)	190 lb (86 kg)	1990-08-23	Marietta, Georgia	Oakville (OJHL)	—
28		Ben Reinhardt	Sophomore	D	5' 10" (1.78 m)	185 lb (84 kg)	1990-03-24	Arnprior, Ontario	Pembroke (CCHL)	—
31		John Griggs	Senior	G	6' 1" (1.85 m)	180 lb (82 kg)	1988-06-28	Barrington, Illinois	Cumberland (CJHL)	—
32		CJ Groh	Junior	G	6' 2" (1.88 m)	185 lb (84 kg)	1990-04-16	Cincinnati, Ohio	St. Louis (NAHL)	—
33		Gregg Gruehl	Freshman	G	5' 11" (1.8 m)	190 lb (86 kg)	1991-08-06	Mayfield Heights, Ohio	Amarillo (NAHL)	—

== Regular season ==
=== Schedule ===
- Green background indicates win.
- Red background indicates loss.
- Yellow background indicates tie.

Date	Time	Opponent	Site	Decision	Result	Attendance	Record
October 6	7:00 pm	Alabama*	Von Braun Center • Huntsville, Alabama (Exhibition)	Gruehl	W 12–1	1,929	—
October 7	3:00 pm	Alabama*	Von Braun Center • Huntsville, Alabama (Exhibition)	Groh	W 10–0	804	—
October 12	7:00 pm	Minnesota State*	Von Braun Center • Huntsville, Alabama	Griggs	L 1–4	5,106	0–1–0
October 13	7:00 pm	Minnesota State*	Von Braun Center • Huntsville, Alabama	Griggs	T 2–2 ^{OT}	1,431	0–1–1
October 19	7:35 pm	at St. Cloud State*	Herb Brooks National Hockey Center • St. Cloud, Minnesota	Griggs	L 3–8	4,149	0–2–1
October 20	7:05 pm	at St. Cloud State*	Herb Brooks National Hockey Center • St. Cloud, Minnesota	Griggs	L 0–4	4,147	0–3–1
October 26	6:05 pm	at Bentley*	John A. Ryan Skating Arena • Waltham, Massachusetts	Griggs	L 1–9	413	0–4–1
October 27	6:05 pm	at American International*	Olympia Ice Center • West Springfield, Massachusetts	Griggs	L 3–4	117	0–5–1
November 2	6:00 pm	at #16 St. Lawrence*	Appleton Arena • Canton, New York	Griggs	L 0–4	2,366	0–6–1
November 3	6:00 pm	at #16 St. Lawrence*	Appleton Arena • Canton, New York	Griggs	L 1–3	1,703	0–7–1
November 10	6:00 pm	at Northeastern*	Matthews Arena • Boston, Massachusetts	Griggs	L 0–3	2,198	0–8–1
November 11	6:00 pm	at Northeastern*	Matthews Arena • Boston, Massachusetts	Gruehl	L 1–3	1,448	0–9–1
November 16	6:35 pm	at Lake Superior State*	Taffy Abel Arena • Sault Ste. Marie, Michigan	Griggs	W 2–1	1,658	1–9–1
November 17	6:05 pm	at Lake Superior State*	Taffy Abel Arena • Sault Ste. Marie, Michigan	Gruehl	L 0–4	1,729	1–10–1
November 23	7:35 pm	at #15 Nebraska–Omaha*	CenturyLink Center • Omaha, Nebraska	Griggs	L 2–3	5,134	1–11–1
November 24	7:05 pm	at #15 Nebraska–Omaha*	CenturyLink Center • Omaha, Nebraska	Gruehl	L 0–8	5,039	1–12–1
November 30	7:00 pm	US Under-18 Team*	Von Braun Center • Huntsville, Alabama (Exhibition)	Griggs	L 2–6	1,381	1–12–1
December 1	7:00 pm	US Under-18 Team*	Von Braun Center • Huntsville, Alabama (Exhibition)	Griggs	T 1–1 ^{OT}	1,469	1–12–1
December 7	7:00 pm	Finlandia*	Von Braun Center • Huntsville, Alabama	Griggs	W 5–2	1,254	2–12–1
December 8	3:00 pm	Finlandia*	Von Braun Center • Huntsville, Alabama	Gruehl	W 4–1	1,004	3–12–1
December 13	7:05 pm	at Wisconsin*	Kohl Center • Madison, Wisconsin	Griggs	L 0–5	7,473	3–13–1
December 14	7:05 pm	at Wisconsin*	Kohl Center • Madison, Wisconsin	Griggs	L 1–4	9,538	3–14–1
December 29	4:05 pm	#1 Boston College*	Mariucci Arena • Minneapolis, Minnesota (Mariucci Classic)	Griggs	L 2–5	10,113	3–15–1
December 30	4:05 pm	Air Force*	Mariucci Arena • Minneapolis, Minnesota (Mariucci Classic)	Gruehl	L 1–6	10,230	3–16–1
January 4	7:00 pm	#7 (D-III) Adrian*	Von Braun Center • Huntsville, Alabama	Griggs	L 2–4	1,121	3–17–1
January 5	7:00 pm	Vanderbilt*	Von Braun Center • Huntsville, Alabama (Exhibition)	Groh	W 11–0	1,181	3–17–1
January 11	7:30 pm	Oklahoma*	Benton H. Wilcoxon Municipal Ice Complex • Huntsville, Alabama (Exhibition)	Gruehl	W 3–1	1,007	3–17–1
January 12	3:00 pm	Oklahoma*	Von Braun Center • Huntsville, Alabama (Exhibition)	Griggs	W 4–0	1,114	3–17–1
February 8	6:30 pm	at Penn State*	Penn State Ice Pavilion • State College, Pennsylvania	Griggs	L 0–4	1,300	3–18–1
February 9	6:30 pm	at Penn State*	Penn State Ice Pavilion • State College, Pennsylvania	Griggs	L 3–4	1,300	3–19–1
March 1	7:05 pm	at Minnesota–Duluth*	AMSOIL Arena • Duluth, Minnesota	Griggs	L 2–4	5,792	3–20–1
March 2	7:05 pm	at Minnesota–Duluth*	AMSOIL Arena • Duluth, Minnesota	Griggs	L 0–4	6,039	3–21–1
*Non-conference game. All times are in Central Time.

=== Standings ===
2012–13 NCAA Division I Independent ice hockey standings
	Overall record					
	GP	W	L	T	GF	GA
Alabama–Huntsville	25	3	21	1	36	103
Penn State	27	13	14	0	74	80
Rankings: USCHO.com Top 20 Poll

=== Opponents by conference ===
Conference	Teams
WCHA	5 (Minnesota–Duluth, Minnesota State, Nebraska–Omaha, St. Cloud State, Wisconsin)
Atlantic Hockey	3 (American International, Air Force, Bentley)
Hockey East	2 (Boston College, Northeastern)
MCHA (D-III)	2 (Adrian, Finlandia)
CCHA	1 (Lake Superior State)
D-I Independents	1 (Penn State)
ECAC	1 (St. Lawrence)

== Player stats ==
=== Skaters ===
Regular season
Player	GP	G	A	Pts	PIM
Jeff Vanderlugt	25	7	3	10	28
Kyle Lysaght	23	5	5	10	12
Graeme Strukoff	25	3	6	9	43
Michael Webley	25	4	4	8	8
Alex Allan	24	1	7	8	25
Steven Koshey	16	2	5	7	4
Frank Misuraca	20	2	4	6	2
Justin Cseter	25	2	3	5	4
Doug Reid	24	2	2	4	12
Curtis deBruyn	24	1	3	4	2
Lasse Uusivirta	24	1	3	4	30
Craig Pierce	23	3	0	3	8
Sebastian Geoffrion	25	1	2	3	60
Brice Geoffrion	25	1	2	3	14
Jack Prince	20	0	3	3	0
Chad Brears	25	1	1	2	12
Stephen Hickey	11	0	2	2	0
Anderson White	23	0	2	2	33
Mat Hagen	2	0	1	1	0
Ben Reinhardt	20	0	1	1	6
C. J. Groh	3	0	0	0	0
Gregg Gruehl	8	0	0	0	0
John Griggs	21	0	0	0	0
Jamie Kendra	21	0	0	0	4
Team	25	36	59	95	313

=== Goaltenders ===
Regular season
Player	GP	TOI	W	L	T	GA	GAA	SA	SV	SV%	SO
John Griggs	21	1106:45	2	17	1	73	3.96	701	628	.896	0
Gregg Gruehl	8	323:01	1	4	0	21	3.90	180	159	.883	0
C. J. Groh	3	70:15	0	0	0	7	5.98	35	28	.800	0
