= 2012–13 NCAA Division I men's ice hockey season =

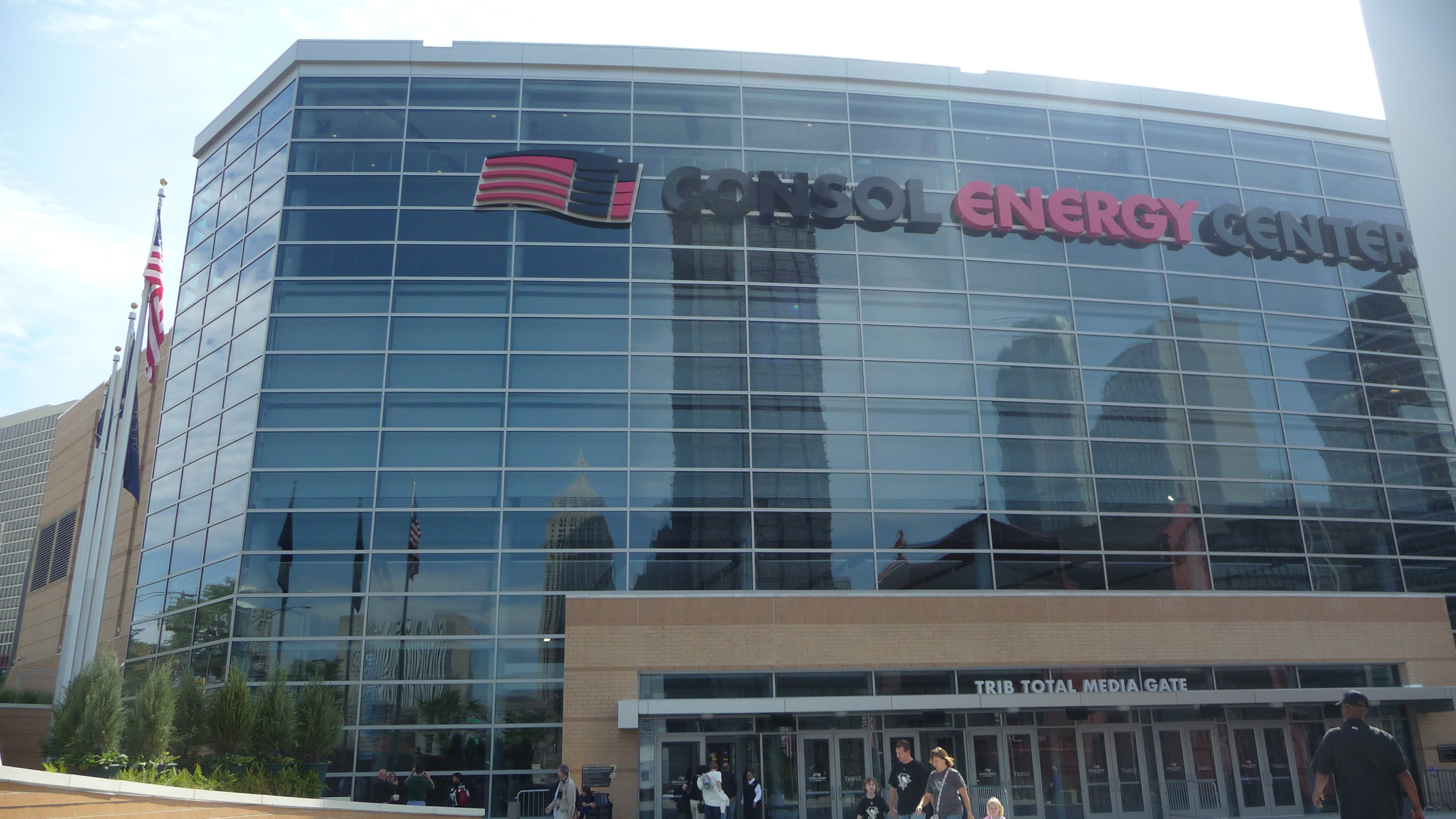
- The Consol Energy Center hosted the 2013 NCAA Division I Men's Ice Hockey Tournament
- Duration: October 6, 2012– April 13, 2013
- NCAA tournament: 2013
- National championship: Consol Energy Center; Pittsburgh, Pennsylvania
- NCAA champion: Yale
- Hobey Baker Award: Drew LeBlanc (St. Cloud State)

The 2012–13 NCAA Division I men's ice hockey season began on October 6, 2012, and concluded with the 2013 NCAA Division I Men's Ice Hockey Tournament's championship game on April 13, 2013, at the Consol Energy Center in Pittsburgh, Pennsylvania. This was the 66th season in which an NCAA ice hockey championship was held and is the 119th year overall where an NCAA school fielded a team.

== Season Outlook ==
=== Pre-season polls ===
The top teams in the nation as ranked before the start of the season.

The U.S. College Hockey Online poll was voted on by coaches, media, and NHL scouts. The USA Today/USA Hockey Magazine poll was voted on by coaches and media.

USCHO Poll
Rank	Team
1	Boston College (35)
2	Minnesota (12)
3	Michigan (3)
4	North Dakota
5	Union
6	Cornell
7	Massachusetts–Lowell
8	Denver
9	Miami
10	Western Michigan
11	Ferris State
12	Minnesota–Duluth
13	Boston University
14	Notre Dame
15	Maine
16	Michigan State
17	Harvard
18	Wisconsin
19	Air Force
20	Colorado College

USA Today Poll
Rank	Team
1	Boston College (20)
2	Minnesota (12)
3	Michigan (2)
4	North Dakota
5	Union
6	Cornell
7	Massachusetts–Lowell
8	Denver
9	Miami
10	Notre Dame
11	Western Michigan
12	Minnesota–Duluth
13	Boston University
14	Ferris State
15	Wisconsin

== Regular season ==
=== Standings ===
2012–13 Atlantic Hockey standings
	Conference record							Overall record					
	GP	W	L	T	PTS	GF	GA	GP	W	L	T	GF	GA
#15 Niagara †	27	20	5	2	42	92	60	38	23	10	5	116	95
Air Force	27	15	7	5	35	92	56	37	17	13	7	120	92
Holy Cross	27	15	9	3	33	83	79	37	20	14	3	111	106
Connecticut	27	14	10	3	31	77	70	37	19	14	4	102	94
Robert Morris	27	13	11	3	29	85	85	38	20	14	4	118	105
Mercyhurst	27	12	11	4	28	90	73	41	19	17	5	128	112
#19 Canisius *	27	12	13	2	26	71	69	43	19	19	5	113	104
RIT	27	11	12	4	26	88	89	38	15	18	5	122	126
American International	27	9	12	6	24	72	78	35	12	17	6	88	112
Bentley	27	10	14	3	23	85	87	35	12	20	3	108	116
Army	27	7	15	5	19	64	92	34	7	22	5	73	121
Sacred Heart	27	2	21	4	8	67	128	36	2	30	4	83	182
Championship: March 23, 2013 † indicates conference regular season champion; * indicates conference tournament champion Rankings: USCHO.com Top 20 Poll

2012–13 Central Collegiate Hockey Association standings
	Conference record								Overall record					
	GP	W	L	T	SW	PTS	GF	GA	GP	W	L	T	GF	GA
#5 Miami †	28	17	7	4	4	59	75	50	42	25	12	5	106	73
#8 Notre Dame *	28	17	8	3	2	56	90	64	41	25	13	3	119	91
#16 Western Michigan	28	15	7	6	3	54	63	55	38	19	11	8	87	78
Ohio State	28	13	10	5	1	45	71	63	40	16	17	7	95	96
Ferris State	28	13	12	3	1	43	67	63	37	16	16	5	96	89
Alaska	28	12	13	3	1	40	73	79	37	17	16	4	95	97
#20 Michigan	28	10	15	3	3	36	81	96	40	18	19	3	129	130
Lake Superior State	28	11	16	1	1	35	65	77	39	17	21	1	92	109
Bowling Green	28	10	15	3	1	34	65	75	41	15	21	5	100	105
Northern Michigan	28	9	15	4	1	32	64	79	38	15	19	4	90	109
Michigan State	28	9	18	1	0	28	57	70	42	14	25	3	87	115
Championship: March 24, 2013 † indicates conference regular season champion; * indicates conference tournament champion Rankings: USCHO.com Top 20 Poll

2012–13 NCAA Division I Independent ice hockey standings
	Overall record					
	GP	W	L	T	GF	GA
Alabama–Huntsville	25	3	21	1	36	103
Penn State	27	13	14	0	74	80
Rankings: USCHO.com Top 20 Poll

2012–13 ECAC Hockey standings
	Conference record							Overall record					
	GP	W	L	T	PTS	GF	GA	GP	W	L	T	GF	GA
#2 Quinnipiac †	22	17	2	3	37	73	32	43	30	8	5	130	72
Rensselaer	22	12	7	3	27	61	49	37	18	14	5	106	88
#1 Yale	22	12	9	1	25	60	62	37	22	12	3	107	96
#10 Union *	22	10	8	4	24	64	52	40	22	13	5	123	85
Dartmouth	22	9	9	4	22	56	57	34	15	14	5	94	88
St. Lawrence	22	9	9	4	22	60	68	38	18	16	4	107	109
Brown	22	7	9	6	20	54	51	36	16	14	6	90	85
Princeton	22	8	10	4	20	52	60	31	10	16	5	72	89
Cornell	22	8	11	3	19	49	55	34	15	16	3	83	91
Clarkson	22	8	11	3	19	58	67	36	9	20	7	89	113
Colgate	22	6	13	3	15	52	66	36	14	18	4	109	102
Harvard	22	6	14	2	14	45	65	32	10	19	3	73	101
Championship: March 23, 2013 † indicates conference regular season champion (Cleary Cup) * indicates conference tournament champion (Whitelaw Cup); Rankings: USCHO.com Top 20 Poll

2012–13 Hockey East standings
	Conference record							Overall record					
	GP	W	L	T	PTS	GF	GA	GP	W	L	T	GF	GA
#3 Massachusetts–Lowell † *	27	16	9	2	34	81	63	41	28	11	2	123	83
#9 Boston College	27	15	9	3	33	88	72	38	22	12	4	128	107
#17 Boston University	27	15	10	2	32	82	73	39	21	16	2	120	110
#11 New Hampshire	27	13	8	6	32	81	58	39	20	12	7	122	90
#18 Providence	27	13	8	6	32	75	63	38	17	14	7	105	90
Merrimack	27	13	11	3	29	68	66	38	15	17	6	91	98
Vermont	27	8	13	6	22	60	80	36	11	19	6	82	110
Maine	27	7	12	8	22	57	72	38	11	19	8	77	104
Massachusetts	27	9	16	2	20	72	79	34	12	19	3	93	102
Northeastern	27	5	18	4	14	59	97	34	9	21	4	81	118
Championship: March 23, 2013 † indicates conference regular season champion; * indicates conference tournament champion Rankings: USCHO.com Top 20 Poll

2012–13 Western Collegiate Hockey Association standings
	Conference record							Overall record					
	GP	W	L	T	PTS	GF	GA	GP	W	L	T	GF	GA
#4 St. Cloud State †	28	18	9	1	37	94	66	42	25	16	1	141	103
#6 Minnesota †	28	16	7	5	37	94	65	40	26	9	5	139	80
#7 North Dakota	28	14	7	7	35	93	71	42	22	13	7	135	103
#12 Wisconsin *	28	13	8	7	33	69	64	42	22	13	7	112	89
#14 Denver	28	14	9	5	33	92	81	39	20	14	5	131	108
#13 Minnesota State	28	16	11	1	33	90	68	41	24	14	3	127	99
Omaha	28	14	12	2	30	92	91	39	19	18	2	127	117
Colorado College	28	11	13	4	26	88	98	42	18	19	5	133	141
Minnesota–Duluth	28	10	13	5	25	75	83	38	14	19	5	99	109
Michigan Tech	28	8	16	4	20	75	92	37	13	20	4	107	116
Bemidji State	28	5	16	7	17	58	87	36	6	22	8	74	110
Alaska–Anchorage	28	2	20	6	10	52	106	36	4	25	7	67	133
Championship: March 23, 2013 † indicates conference regular season champion; * indicates conference tournament champion Rankings: USCHO.com Top 20 Poll

== 2013 NCAA Tournament ==
Regional Semi-finals
1	Quinnipiac	4
4	Canisius	3
East Regional
2	Boston College	1
3	Union	5
1	Notre Dame	1
4	St. Cloud State	5
Midwest Regional
2	Miami	4
3	Minnesota State	0
1	Minnesota	2
4	Yale	3*
West Regional
2	North Dakota	2
3	Niagara	1
1	Massachusetts–Lowell	6
4	Wisconsin	1
Northeast Regional
2	New Hampshire	5
3	Denver	2

Regional Finals
1	Quinnipiac	5
3	Union	1
4	St. Cloud State	4
2	Miami	1
4	Yale	4
2	North Dakota	1
1	Massachusetts–Lowell	2
3	New Hampshire	0

Frozen Four
E1	Quinnipiac	4
MW4	St. Cloud State	1
W4	Yale	3*
NE1	Massachusetts–Lowell	2

National Championship
E1	Quinnipiac	0
W4	Yale	4

Note: * denotes overtime period(s)

== Player stats ==
=== Scoring leaders ===
GP = Games played; G = Goals; A = Assists; Pts = Points; PIM = Penalty minutes

Player	Class	Team	GP	G	A	Pts	PIM
Rylan Schwartz	Senior	Colorado College	41	20	33	53	35
Danny Kristo	Senior	North Dakota	40	26	26	52	24
Ryan Walters	Junior	Nebraska–Omaha	39	22	30	52	20
Erik Haula	Junior	Minnesota	37	16	35	51	14
Greg Carey	Junior	St. Lawrence	38	28	23	51	40
Johnny Gaudreau	Sophomore	Boston College	35	21	30	51	29
Drew LeBlanc	Senior	St. Cloud State	42	13	37	50	14
Corban Knight	Senior	North Dakota	41	16	33	49	40
Matt Leitner	Sophomore	Minnesota State	41	17	30	47	47
Kyle Flanagan	Senior	St. Lawrence	35	15	32	47	42

=== Leading goaltenders ===
GP = Games played; Min = Minutes played; W = Wins; L = Losses; T = Ties; GA = Goals against; SO = Shutouts; SV% = Save percentage; GAA = Goals against average

Player	Class	Team	GP	Min	W	L	T	GA	SO	SV%	GAA
Connor Hellebuyck	Freshman	Massachusetts–Lowell	24	1397:11	20	3	0	32	6	.952	1.37
Ryan McKay	Freshman	Miami	23	1299:28	13	7	2	30	4	.946	1.39
Eric Hartzell	Senior	Quinnipiac	42	2522:02	30	7	5	66	5	.933	1.57
Jason Kasdorf	Freshman	Rensselaer	23	1329:43	14	5	2	36	3	.935	1.62
Anthony Borelli	Senior	Brown	28	1596:53	14	9	5	49	4	.942	1.84
Adam Wilcox	Freshman	Minnesota	39	2331:00	25	8	5	73	3	.921	1.88
Carsen Chubak	Junior	Niagara	35	2100:46	23	7	5	67	6	.939	1.91
Matt Grogan	Senior	Connecticut	23	1274:35	14	4	3	41	2	.937	1.93
Jay Williams	Freshman	Miami	21	1235:20	12	5	3	40	2	.924	1.94
Joel Rumpel	Sophomore	Wisconsin	29	1716:20	16	9	4	56	4	.929	1.96

== Awards ==
=== NCAA ===
Award		Recipient
Hobey Baker Award		Drew LeBlanc, St. Cloud State
Spencer T. Penrose Award		Norm Bazin, Massachusetts–Lowell
National Rookie of the Year		Jon Gillies, Providence
Derek Hines Unsung Hero Award		Kyle Murphy, Providence
Lowe's Senior CLASS Award		Cheyne Rocha, Army
Tournament Most Outstanding Player		Andrew Miller, Yale
AHCA All-American Teams
East First Team	Position	West First Team
Eric Hartzell, Quinnipiac	G	Brady Hjelle, Ohio State
Nick Bailen, Rensselaer	D	Nick Jensen, St. Cloud State
Chad Ruhwedel, Massachusetts–Lowell	D	Jacob Trouba, Michigan
Trevor van Riemsdyk, New Hampshire	D	
Kyle Flanagan, St. Lawrence	F	Austin Czarnik, Miami
Johnny Gaudreau, Boston College	F	Danny Kristo, North Dakota
Steven Whitney, Boston College	F	Drew LeBlanc, St. Cloud State
East Second Team	Position	West Second Team
Jon Gillies, Providence	G	Juho Olkinuora, Denver
Shayne Gostisbehere, Union	D	Danny DeKeyser, Western Michigan
George Hughes, St. Lawrence	D	Nate Schmidt, Minnesota
Greg Carey, St. Lawrence	F	Corban Knight, North Dakota
Mike Collins, Merrimack	F	Anders Lee, Notre Dame
Andrew Miller, Yale	F	Ryan Walters, Omaha

=== Atlantic Hockey ===
Award		Recipient
Player of the Year		Carsen Chubak, Niagara
Best Defensive Forward		Marc Zanette, Niagara
Best Defenseman		Adam McKenzie, Air Force
Rookie of the Year		Andrew Gladiuk, Bentley
Individual Sportsmanship		Eric Delong, Sacred Heart
Regular Season Scoring Trophy		Matthew Zay, Mercyhurst
Regular Season Goaltending Award		Matt Grogan, Connecticut
Coach of the Year		Dave Burkholder, Niagara
Most Valuable Player in Tournament		Kyle Gibbons, Canisius
All-Atlantic Hockey Teams
First Team	Position	Second Team
Carsen Chubak, Niagara	G	Ben Meisner, American International
Nick Jones, Mercyhurst	D	Dan Weiss, Niagara
Chris Saracino, RIT	D	Steve Weinstein, Bentley
Adam McKenzie, Air Force	D	
Kyle De Laurell, Air Force	F	Ryan Misiak, Mercyhurst
Giancarlo Iuorio, Niagara	F	Adam Pleskach, American International
Brett Gensler, Bentley	F	Adam Brace, Robert Morris
Third Team	Position	Rookie Team
Matt Grogan, Connecticut	G	
Kevin Ryan, Niagara	D	Matt Blomquist, Bentley
Jeff Ceccacci, American International	D	Karl Beckman, Holy Cross
Matthew Zay, Mercyhurst	F	Andrew Gladiuk, Bentley
Kyle Gibbons, Canisius	F	Joe Kozlak, Army
Eric Delong, Sacred Heart	F	Chris Porter, American International

=== CCHA ===
Awards		Recipient
Player of the Year		Austin Czarnik, Miami
Best Defensive Forward		Dane Walters, Western Michigan
Best Defensive Defenseman		Danny DeKeyser, Western Michigan
Best Offensive Defenseman		Jacob Trouba, Michigan
Rookie of the Year		Riley Barber, Miami
Best Goaltender		Brady Hjelle, Ohio State
Coach of the Year		Enrico Blasi, Miami
Terry Flanagan Memorial Award		Joe Rogers, Notre Dame
Ilitch Humanitarian Award		Brett Beebe, Western Michigan
Ilitch Humanitarian Award		Kaare Odegard, Alaska
Perani Cup Champion		Brady Hjelle, Ohio State
Scholar-Athlete of the Year		Adam Henderson, Alaska
Most Valuable Player in Tournament		T. J. Tynan, Notre Dame
All-CCHA Teams
First Team	Position	Second Team
Brady Hjelle, Ohio State	G	Frank Slubowski, Western Michigan
Jacob Trouba, Michigan	D	Luke Witkowski, Western Michigan
Danny DeKeyser, Western Michigan	D	Bobby Shea, Bowling Green
Austin Czarnik, Miami	F	Tanner Fritz, Ohio State
Anders Lee, Notre Dame	F	Ryan Carpenter, Bowling Green
Riley Barber, Miami	F	Andy Taranto, Alaska
Rookie Team	Position	
Ryan McKay, Miami	G	
Jacob Trouba, Michigan	D	
Matthew Caito, Miami	D	
Kenney Morrison, Western Michigan	D	
Riley Barber, Miami	F	
Mario Lucia, Notre Dame	F	
Tyler Morley, Alaska	F	

=== ECAC ===
Award		Recipient
Player of the Year		Eric Hartzell, Quinnipiac
Best Defensive Forward		Greg Miller, Cornell
Best Defensive Defenseman		Zach Davies, Quinnipiac
Rookie of the Year		Jason Kasdorf, Rensselaer
Ken Dryden Award		Eric Hartzell, Quinnipiac
Tim Taylor Award		Rand Pecknold, Quinnipiac
Student-Athlete of the Year		Matt Zarbo, Clarkson
Most Outstanding Player in Tournament		Troy Grosenick, Union
All-ECAC Hockey Teams
First Team	Position	Second Team
Eric Hartzell, Quinnipiac	G	Jason Kasdorf, Rensselaer
Nick Bailen, Rensselaer	D	Mike Keenan, Dartmouth
George Hughes, St. Lawrence	D	Shayne Gostisbehere, Union
Greg Carey, St. Lawrence	F	Kenny Agostino, Yale
Kyle Flanagan, St. Lawrence	F	Andrew Calof, Princeton
Andrew Miller, Yale	F	Matt Lorito, Brown
Third Team	Position	Rookie Team
Anthony Borelli, Brown	G	Jason Kasdorf, Rensselaer
Mat Bodie, Union	D	Paul Geiger, Clarkson
Zach Davies, Quinnipiac	D	Ryan Obuchowski, Yale
Daniel Carr, Union	F	Kyle Baun, Colgate
Jeremy Langlois, Quinnipiac	F	Tylor Spink, Colgate
Greg Miller, Cornell	F	Jimmy Vesey, Harvard

=== Hockey East ===
Award		Recipient
Player of the Year		Johnny Gaudreau, Boston College
Rookie of the Year		Jon Gillies, Providence
Bob Kullen Coach of the Year Award		Norm Bazin, Massachusetts-Lowell
Len Ceglarski Award		Chris McCarthy, Vermont
Best Defensive Forward		Tim Schaller, Providence
Best Defensive Defenseman		Patrick Wey, Boston College
Three-Stars Award		John Henrion, New Hampshire
Three-Stars Award		Martin Ouellette, Maine
William Flynn Tournament Most Valuable Player		Connor Hellebuyck, Massachusetts-Lowell
All-Hockey East Teams
First Team	Position	Second Team
Jon Gillies, Providence	G	Connor Hellebuyck, Massachusetts-Lowell
Chad Ruhwedel, Massachusetts-Lowell	D	Jordan Heywood, Merrimack
Trevor van Riemsdyk, New Hampshire	D	Patrick Wey, Boston College
Mike Collins, Merrimack	F	Joseph Pendenza, Massachusetts-Lowell
John Gaudreau, Boston College	F	Evan Rodrigues, Boston University
Steven Whitney, Boston College	F	Riley Wetmore, Massachusetts-Lowell
Rookie Team	Position	
Jon Gillies, Providence	G	
Connor Hellebuyck, Massachusetts-Lowell	G	
Matt Grzelcyk, Boston University	D	
Mike Matheson, Boston College	D	
Danny O'Regan, Boston University	F	
Kevin Roy, Northeastern	F	

=== WCHA ===
Award		Recipient
Player of the Year		Drew LeBlanc, St. Cloud State
Student-Athlete of the Year		Drew LeBlanc, St. Cloud State
Defensive Player of the Year		Nick Jensen, St. Cloud State
Rookie of the Year		Stephon Williams, Minnesota State
Scoring Champion		Ryan Walters, Nebraska–Omaha
Goaltending Champion		Stephon Williams, Minnesota State
Coach of the Year		Mike Hastings, Minnesota State
Most Valuable Player in Tournament		Nic Kerdiles, Wisconsin
All-WCHA Teams
First Team	Position	Second Team
Stephon Williams, Minnesota State	G	Juho Olkinuora, Denver
Nate Schmidt, Minnesota	D	Joey LaLeggia, Denver
Nick Jensen, St. Cloud State	D	Mike Boivin, Colorado College
Ryan Walters, Nebraska–Omaha	F	Corban Knight, North Dakota
Drew LeBlanc, St. Cloud State	F	Erik Haula, Minnesota
Danny Kristo, North Dakota	F	Rylan Schwartz, Colorado College
Third Team	Position	Rookie Team
Adam Wilcox, Minnesota	G	Stephon Williams, Minnesota State
Andrej Sustr, Nebraska–Omaha	D	Nolan Zajac, Denver
Jake McCabe, Wisconsin	D	Andrew Welinski, Minnesota–Duluth
Matt Leitner, Minnesota State	F	Tony Cameranesi, Minnesota–Duluth
Nick Bjugstad, Minnesota	F	Alex Petan, Michigan Tech
Eriah Hayes, Minnesota State	F	Rocco Grimaldi, North Dakota

== 2013 NHL entry draft ==
Round	Pick	Player	College	Conference	NHL team
2	31	Ian McCoshen ^{†}	Boston College	Hockey East	Florida Panthers
2	35	J. T. Compher ^{†}	Michigan	CCHA	Buffalo Sabres
2	38	Connor Hurley ^{†}	Notre Dame	CCHA	Buffalo Sabres
2	42	Steve Santini ^{†}	Boston College	Hockey East	New Jersey Devils
2	46	Gustav Olofsson ^{†}	Colorado College	WCHA	Minnesota Wild
3	65	Adam Tambellini ^{†}	North Dakota	WCHA	New York Rangers
3	66	Brett Pesce	New Hampshire	Hockey East	Carolina Hurricanes
3	70	Eamon McAdam ^{†}	Penn State	Independent	New York Islanders
3	74	John Hayden ^{†}	Yale	ECAC Hockey	Chicago Blackhawks
3	76	Taylor Cammarata ^{†}	Minnesota	WCHA	New York Islanders
3	77	Jake Guentzel ^{†}	Omaha	WCHA	Pittsburgh Penguins
3	87	Keaton Thompson ^{†}	North Dakota	WCHA	Anaheim Ducks
4	92	Evan Cowley ^{†}	Denver	WCHA	Florida Panthers
4	97	Michael Downing ^{†}	Michigan	CCHA	Florida Panthers
4	98	Matt Buckles ^{†}	Cornell	ECAC Hockey	Florida Panthers
4	104	Andrew Copp	Michigan	CCHA	Winnipeg Jets
4	106	Stephon Williams	Minnesota State	WCHA	New York Islanders
4	109	David Pope ^{†}	Omaha	WCHA	Detroit Red Wings
4	113	Aidan Muir ^{†}	Western Michigan	CCHA	Edmonton Oilers
4	118	Hudson Fasching ^{†}	Minnesota	WCHA	Los Angeles Kings
4	120	Ryan Fitzgerald ^{†}	Boston College	Hockey East	Boston Bruins
4	121	Tyler Motte ^{†}	Michigan	CCHA	Chicago Blackhawks
5	123	Will Butcher ^{†}	Denver	WCHA	Colorado Avalanche
5	127	Tucker Poolman ^{†}	North Dakota	WCHA	Winnipeg Jets
5	128	Evan Campbell ^{†}	Massachusetts–Lowell	Hockey East	Edmonton Oilers
5	129	Cal Petersen ^{†}	Notre Dame	CCHA	Buffalo Sabres
5	132	Terrance Amorosa ^{†}	Clarkson	ECAC Hockey	Philadelphia Flyers
5	133	Connor Clifton ^{†}	Quinnipiac	ECAC Hockey	Phoenix Coyotes
5	134	Luke Johnson ^{†}	North Dakota	WCHA	Chicago Blackhawks
5	137	Carson Soucy ^{†}	Minnesota–Duluth	WCHA	Minnesota Wild
5	140	Teemu Kivihalme ^{†}	Colorado College	WCHA	Nashville Predators
5	141	Michael Brodzinski ^{†}	Minnesota	WCHA	San Jose Sharks
5	143	Anthony Florentino ^{†}	Providence	Hockey East	Buffalo Sabres
5	147	Grant Besse ^{†}	Wisconsin	WCHA	Anaheim Ducks
5	148	Jonny Brodzinski	St. Cloud State	WCHA	Los Angeles Kings
5	150	Wiley Sherman ^{†}	Harvard	ECAC Hockey	Boston Bruins
5	151	Gage Ausmus ^{†}	North Dakota	WCHA	Los Angeles Kings
6	153	Ben Storm ^{†}	St. Cloud State	WCHA	Colorado Avalanche
6	157	Tim Harrison ^{†}	Colgate	ECAC Hockey	Calgary Flames
6	159	Sean Malone ^{†}	Harvard	ECAC Hockey	Buffalo Sabres
6	161	Chris LeBlanc ^{†}	Merrimack	Hockey East	Ottawa Senators
6	162	Merrick Madsen ^{†}	Harvard	ECAC Hockey	Philadelphia Flyers
6	164	Dane Birks ^{†}	Michigan Tech	WCHA	Pittsburgh Penguins
6	167	Avery Peterson ^{†}	Minnesota–Duluth	WCHA	Minnesota Wild
6	168	Quentin Shore	Denver	WCHA	Ottawa Senators
6	174	Brian Pinho ^{†}	Providence	Hockey East	Washington Capitals
6	175	Mike Williamson ^{†}	Penn State	Independent	Vancouver Canucks
6	179	Blaine Byron ^{†}	Maine	Hockey East	Pittsburgh Penguins
6	181	Anthony Louis ^{†}	Miami	CCHA	Chicago Blackhawks
7	185	Wade Murphy ^{†}	North Dakota	WCHA	Nashville Predators
7	193	Jedd Soleway ^{†}	Wisconsin	WCHA	Phoenix Coyotes
7	195	Peter Quenneville ^{†}	Quinnipiac	ECAC Hockey	Columbus Blue Jackets
7	197	Nolan De Jong ^{†}	Michigan	CCHA	Minnesota Wild
7	198	John Gilmour	Providence	Hockey East	Calgary Flames
7	201	Jake Jackson ^{†}	Michigan Tech	WCHA	San Jose Sharks
7	209	Troy Josephs ^{†}	Clarkson	ECAC Hockey	Pittsburgh Penguins

† incoming freshman

== See also ==
- 2012–13 NCAA Division II men's ice hockey season
- 2012–13 NCAA Division III men's ice hockey season
