= Danny Kristo =

American professional ice hockey forward (born 1990)

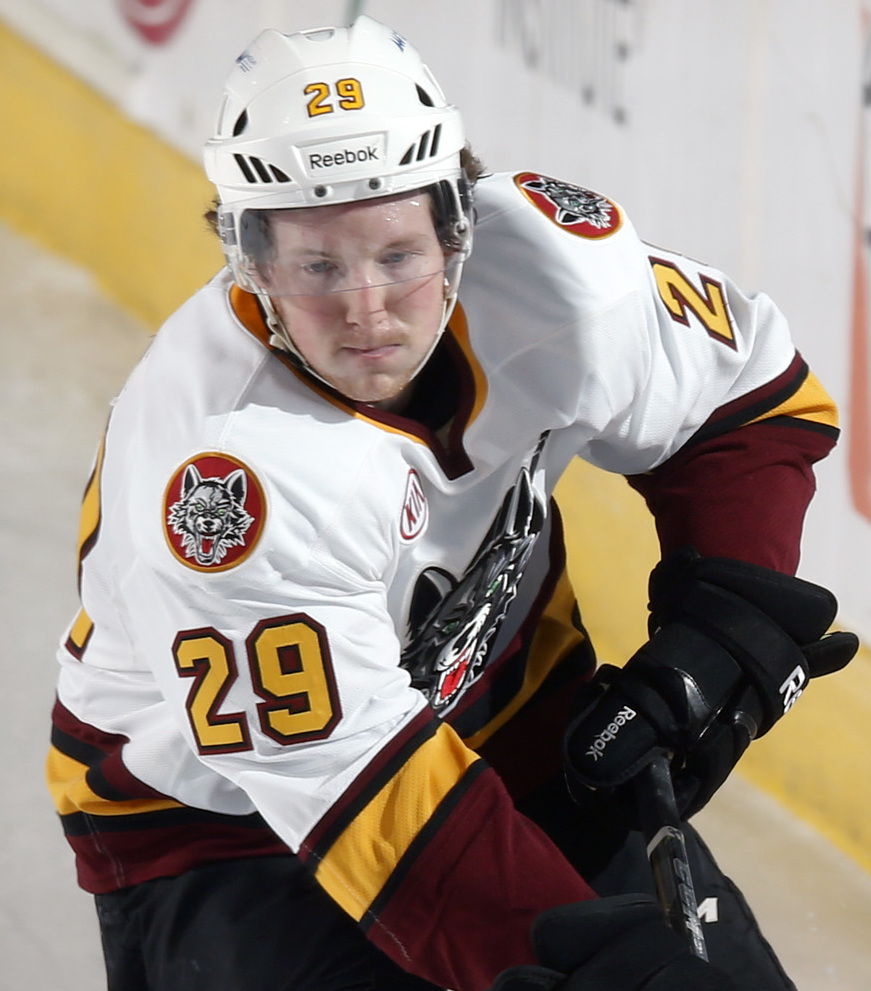
- Kristo with the Chicago Wolves
- Born: June 18, 1990 (age 36) Eden Prairie, Minnesota, U.S.
- Height: 5 ft 11 in (180 cm)
- Weight: 185 lb (84 kg; 13 st 3 lb)
- Position: Right wing
- Shoots: Right
- EIHL team Former teams: Coventry Blaze; Dinamo Riga; Brynäs IF; SC Rapperswil-Jona Lakers; Kunlun Red Star; Augsburger Panther; Rytíři Kladno; HK Dukla Michalovce; Sheffield Steelers
- National team: United States
- NHL draft: 56th overall, 2008; Montreal Canadiens
- Playing career: 2013–present

Daniel Kristo (born June 18, 1990) is an American professional ice hockey forward for the Coventry Blaze in the Elite Ice Hockey League (EIHL). He was selected in the second round, 56th overall, by the Montreal Canadiens in the 2008 NHL entry draft.

== Playing career ==
Kristo was drafted by the Montreal Canadiens, 56th overall in the 2008 NHL entry draft. He played college hockey with the University of North Dakota in the NCAA Men's Division I WCHA conference. In his senior year, Kristo's outstanding play was rewarded with a selection to the 2012–13 All-WCHA First Team.

On July 2, 2013, Kristo was traded, by the Canadiens, to the New York Rangers for right winger Christian Thomas. On August 19, 2014, the Rangers announced that they had re-signed Kristo, who was a restricted free agent, to a one-year $826,875 contract.

On July 2, 2015, Kristo left the Rangers as a free agent, signing a one-year, two-way contract with the St. Louis Blues. In the 2015–16 season, Kristo was assigned to play with the Blues AHL affiliate, the Chicago Wolves. In playing the entirety of the year with the Wolves, Kristo appeared in 71 games in compiling 25 goals and 48 points. On August 2, 2016, Kristo re-signed with the St. Louis Blues on a one-year, two-way contract.

In the 2016–17 season, his second year with the Wolves, Kristo had 2 assists in 8 games before he was dealt by the Blues to the Pittsburgh Penguins in exchange for defenseman Reid McNeill on November 19, 2016. Remaining in the AHL with the Wilkes-Barre/Scranton Penguins, Kristo added 6 goals and 11 points in 32 games before on February 23, 2017, he was dealt again by the Penguins to the Carolina Hurricanes along with a second round draft pick in exchange for Ron Hainsey. He played out the season with the Hurricanes AHL affiliate, the Charlotte Checkers, contributing with 10 points in 14 games.

With dwindling NHL prospects going forward, Kristo opted to sign his first contract abroad in agreeing to a one-year deal with Latvian based Dinamo Riga of the KHL on June 30, 2017.

After a two-year stint in the Swiss National League with SC Rapperswil-Jona Lakers, Kristo left as a free agent to return to the KHL, agreeing to a one-year deal with Chinese club, HC Kunlun Red Star, on July 29, 2020. Kristo collected 4 goals in 14 contests with Kunlun before leaving to KHL to join German club, Augsburger Panther of the Deutsche Eishockey Liga (DEL) on January 8, 2021.

As a free agent, following completing the season with the Augsburger Panther, Kristo moved to the Czech Republic in agreeing to a one-year contract with Rytíři Kladno of the ELH, on July 14, 2021.

In October 2022, following a spell in Slovakia with HK Dukla Michalovce, Kristo moved to the UK to sign for Elite Ice Hockey League (EIHL) side Sheffield Steelers.

In July 2023, Kristo moved to fellow Elite League club Coventry Blaze.

== Personal life ==
Kristo's second cousin Ben Blood was drafted by the Ottawa Senators in the 2007 NHL entry draft. He currently plays for Tappara in the Liiga.

== Career statistics ==
=== Regular season and playoffs ===
			Regular season					Playoffs
Season	Team	League	GP	G	A	Pts	PIM	GP	G	A	Pts	PIM
2006–07	U.S. NTDP U17	USDP	59	12	16	28	36	—	—	—	—	—
2006–07	U.S. NTDP U18	NAHL	39	8	10	18	34	6	0	1	1	2
2007–08	U.S. NTDP U17	USDP	2	1	1	2	2	—	—	—	—	—
2007–08	U.S. NTDP U18	NAHL	14	4	4	8	6	—	—	—	—	—
2007–08	U.S. NTDP U18	USDP	55	21	17	38	49	—	—	—	—	—
2008–09	Omaha Lancers	USHL	50	22	36	58	18	3	3	0	3	2
2009–10	University of North Dakota	WCHA	41	15	21	36	8	—	—	—	—	—
2010–11	University of North Dakota	WCHA	34	8	20	28	18	—	—	—	—	—
2011–12	University of North Dakota	WCHA	42	19	26	45	33	—	—	—	—	—
2012–13	University of North Dakota	WCHA	40	26	26	52	24	—	—	—	—	—
2012–13	Hamilton Bulldogs	AHL	9	0	3	3	2	—	—	—	—	—
2013–14	Hartford Wolf Pack	AHL	65	25	18	43	18	—	—	—	—	—
2014–15	Hartford Wolf Pack	AHL	72	22	24	46	35	15	3	3	6	2
2015–16	Chicago Wolves	AHL	71	25	23	48	29	—	—	—	—	—
2016–17	Chicago Wolves	AHL	8	0	2	2	2	—	—	—	—	—
2016–17	Wilkes–Barre/Scranton Penguins	AHL	32	6	5	11	10	—	—	—	—	—
2016–17	Charlotte Checkers	AHL	14	4	6	10	4	5	0	1	1	0
2017–18	Dinamo Rīga	KHL	42	8	13	21	6	—	—	—	—	—
2018–19	Brynäs IF	SHL	10	0	4	4	6	—	—	—	—	—
2018–19	SC Rapperswil–Jona Lakers	NL	37	9	15	24	6	—	—	—	—	—
2019–20	SC Rapperswil-Jona Lakers	NL	39	11	11	22	0	—	—	—	—	—
2020–21	Kunlun Red Star	KHL	14	4	0	4	4	—	—	—	—	—
2020–21	Augsburger Panther	DEL	31	8	12	20	10	—	—	—	—	—
2021–22	Rytíři Kladno	Czech	38	3	8	11	12	—	—	—	—	—
2021–22	Västerås IK	Swe-1	15	4	5	9	2	7	2	1	3	4
2022–23	HK Dukla Michalovce	Slovak	6	1	1	2	0	—	—	—	—	—
2022–23	Sheffield Steelers	EIHL	47	12	18	30	12	4	2	3	5	2
AHL totals			271	82	81	163	100	20	3	4	7	2

Medal record

Representing United States

Ice hockey

World Championships
Bronze medal – third place	2013 Sweden/Finland	

World Junior Championships
Gold medal – first place	2010 Canada	

World Junior A Challenge
Gold medal – first place	2008 Camrose	

IIHF World U18 Championship
Bronze medal – third place	2008 Russia	

=== International ===
Year	Team	Event	Result	GP	G	A	Pts	PIM
2008	United States	WJC18	3rd place, bronze medalist(s)	7	3	3	6	2
2009	United States	WJC	5th	6	1	0	1	0
2010	United States	WJC	1st place, gold medalist(s)	7	5	3	8	0
2013	United States	WC	3rd place, bronze medalist(s)	10	1	2	3	2
Junior totals				20	9	6	15	2
Senior totals				10	1	2	3	2

== Awards and achievements ==
Award	Year
College
All-WCHA Rookie Team	2009–10
All-WCHA First Team	2012–13
AHCA West First-Team All-American	2012–13

Awards and achievements
Preceded by Jordan Schroeder	WCHA Rookie of the Year; 2009–10	Succeeded by Jason Zucker
