= Corban Knight =

Canadian ice hockey player (born 1990)

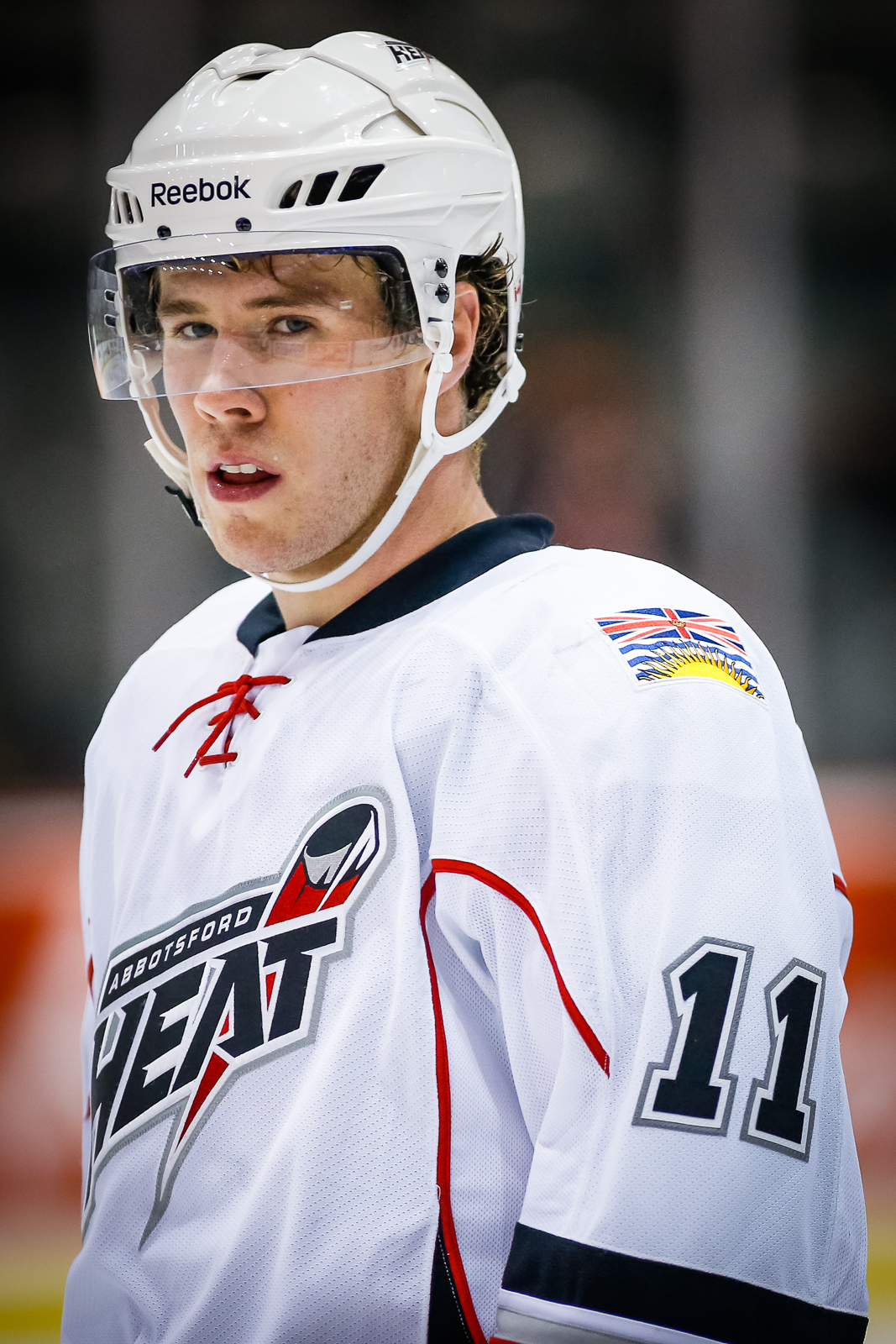
- Knight in 2013
- Born: September 10, 1990 (age 35) Oliver, British Columbia, Canada
- Height: 6 ft 2 in (188 cm)
- Weight: 195 lb (88 kg; 13 st 13 lb)
- Position: Centre
- Shot: Right
- NL team Former teams: SC Bern; Calgary Flames; Florida Panthers; Philadelphia Flyers; Barys Nur-Sultan; Avangard Omsk
- National team: Canada
- NHL draft: 135th overall, 2009; Florida Panthers
- Playing career: 2013–2024

Corban Knight (born September 10, 1990) is a Canadian professional ice hockey forward who is currently a free agent. He was a fifth-round selection, 135th overall, by the Florida Panthers in the 2009 NHL entry draft, but was traded to the Calgary Flames after the Panthers were unable to sign him to a contract. Knight played four seasons of college hockey with the University of North Dakota and was a finalist for the Hobey Baker Award in 2012–13.

== Early life ==
Knight was born in Oliver, British Columbia and moved to High River, Alberta, at age 11. His parents are Jack and Laurie Knight. Jack Knight is a Baptist minister and chaplain for the Calgary Flames and Calgary Stampeders.

Playing midget hockey with the Strathmore UFA Bisons, Knight led the Alberta Midget Hockey League in scoring in 2007–08 with 65 points. He was also named the most valuable player of the 2007 Mac's Midget AAA World Invitational Tournament after leading the event in scoring. A late developer physically, he was not drafted to play junior hockey in the Western Hockey League and opted to play Junior A with the Okotoks Oilers of the Alberta Junior Hockey League (AJHL). He played a handful of games with the Oilers in 2007–08, then won the league's Rookie of the Year award in 2008–09 after finishing eighth overall in AJHL scoring with 72 points, including 34 goals.

== Playing career ==
=== College ===
The Florida Panthers selected Knight with their fifth-round selection, 135th overall, at the 2009 NHL entry draft. While he had expected to return to Okotoks for the 2009–10 season, he instead joined the University of North Dakota (UND) on a full scholarship after junior forward Matt Frattin was dismissed from the squad. Knight studied physical education, exercise science and wellness while attending UND.

In his freshman year, Knight finished second on the team in rookie scoring with 13 points and was twice named Western Collegiate Hockey Association (WCHA) rookie of the week. Knight and UND won their first of three consecutive Broadmoor Trophies as WCHA playoff champions. He finished second on the team and 10th in the WCHA with 40 points in his sophomore year, 2010–11, and set a school record for faceoff efficiency; he won 59.9 percent of his draws to surpass Zach Parise's mark of 59.1 percent in 2003–04. Knight was named an assistant captain in his junior season of 2011–12, and finished with 40 points. He won the Archie Krum Memorial Athletic Scholarship, given by the school to a player who "demonstrates leadership qualities, high academic standards and athletic excellence."

Completing his college eligibility in 2012–13, Knight recorded his third consecutive 40-point season as his 16 goals and 33 assists totaled a personal high of 49 points. He had a 19-game point streak, the longest for any UND player in 25 years. Knight won the Jeff Anderson Scholarship Award as UND's most valuable player, was named to the National Collegiate Athletic Association West Region All-Tournament Team and was named to the second team at both the All-WCHA and All-American levels. He was also named a top-ten finalist for the Hobey Baker Award as top player in American college hockey; the award was ultimately won by Drew LeBlanc.

=== Professional ===
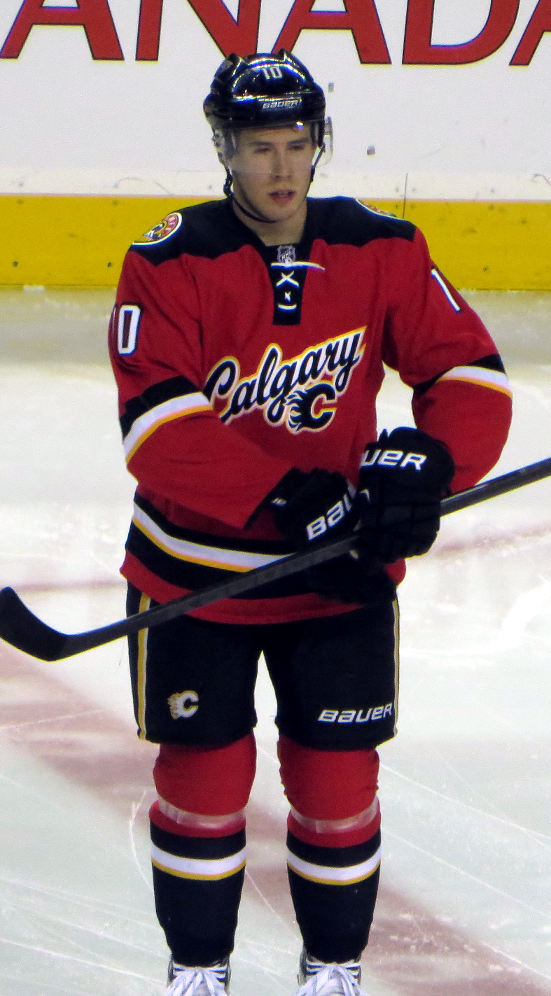
Knight with the Calgary Flames in 2014.

Upon graduation, the Panthers were required to sign Knight to a contract or risk losing his playing rights as he would become an unrestricted free agent. Unable to come to terms on a deal, Florida chose to trade him to the Calgary Flames in exchange for a fourth-round selection at the 2013 NHL entry draft. Knight began the 2013–14 season with Calgary's American Hockey League (AHL) affiliate, the Abbotsford Heat. He had 14 goals and 51 points in his first 53 games when a string of injuries in Calgary led to his recall on March 5, 2014. Knight made his NHL debut that night in a 4–1 win over the Ottawa Senators. He scored his first goal (and point) against goaltender Frederik Andersen in a 7–2 victory over the Anaheim Ducks on March 12, 2014.

During the 2014–15 season, while with AHL affiliate the Adirondack Flames, Knight was traded by the Flames in a return to his original club, the Florida Panthers, in exchange for Drew Shore on January 9, 2015.

Knight signed a one-year AHL contract with the Lehigh Valley Phantoms on September 1, 2016. In the 2016–17 season, he appeared in 72 games with the Phantoms where he recorded 11 goals and 29 assists for 40 points. On July 1, 2017, Knight was rewarded for his season by regaining an NHL contract in accepting a two-year, two-way deal with the Phantoms' NHL affiliate, the Philadelphia Flyers. Knight performed quite well in the 2017–18 season with the Phantoms tallying 14 goals and 23 assists appearing in just 58 games.

As a free agent from the Flyers, he left North America and signed a one-year contract with Barys Nur-Sultan of the KHL on May 28, 2019. He made an immediate impact with the Kazakh-based club, posting 20 goals and 40 points in 60 regular season games in the 2019–20 season. He added an assist during Barys' opening-round victory in the playoffs before the season was cancelled due to the COVID-19 pandemic.

As a free agent at the conclusion of his contract with Barys, Knight continued in the KHL, securing a lucrative two-year contract with Russian club Avangard Omsk on May 1, 2020.

Following three productive seasons with Omsk, Knight left the KHL as a free agent and continued his career abroad by agreeing to a one-year contract with Swiss club, SC Bern of the NL, on August 30, 2023. He scored 11 goals and 14 assists for 25 points in 41 games before leaving the club in the offseason.

== International play ==
In January 2022, Knight was selected to play for Team Canada at the 2022 Winter Olympics.

== Career statistics ==
=== Regular season and playoffs ===
			Regular season					Playoffs
Season	Team	League	GP	G	A	Pts	PIM	GP	G	A	Pts	PIM
2006–07	UFA Bisons AAA	AMHL	36	6	18	24	44	8	2	4	6	16
2007–08	UFA Bisons AAA	AMHL	36	29	36	65	64	6	5	4	9	10
2007–08	Okotoks Oilers	AJHL	4	1	0	1	0	7	0	0	0	0
2008–09	Okotoks Oilers	AJHL	61	34	38	72	55	9	10	2	12	12
2009–10	University of North Dakota	WCHA	37	6	7	13	35	—	—	—	—	—
2010–11	University of North Dakota	WCHA	44	14	30	44	34	—	—	—	—	—
2011–12	University of North Dakota	WCHA	39	16	24	40	36	—	—	—	—	—
2012–13	University of North Dakota	WCHA	41	16	33	49	40	—	—	—	—	—
2013–14	Abbotsford Heat	AHL	70	18	26	44	50	2	0	1	1	2
2013–14	Calgary Flames	NHL	7	1	0	1	0	—	—	—	—	—
2014–15	Adirondack Flames	AHL	22	8	4	12	12	—	—	—	—	—
2014–15	Calgary Flames	NHL	2	0	0	0	0	—	—	—	—	—
2014–15	San Antonio Rampage	AHL	36	8	16	24	8	3	1	0	1	0
2015–16	Portland Pirates	AHL	33	4	7	11	8	5	0	3	3	6
2015–16	Florida Panthers	NHL	20	2	5	7	4	—	—	—	—	—
2016–17	Lehigh Valley Phantoms	AHL	72	11	29	40	44	5	0	1	1	2
2017–18	Lehigh Valley Phantoms	AHL	58	14	23	37	20	13	1	3	4	4
2018–19	Philadelphia Flyers	NHL	23	1	3	4	0	—	—	—	—	—
2018–19	Lehigh Valley Phantoms	AHL	8	4	6	10	2	—	—	—	—	—
2019–20	Barys Nur–Sultan	KHL	60	20	20	40	12	5	0	1	1	0
2020–21	Avangard Omsk	KHL	57	18	22	40	6	24	5	11	16	2
2021–22	Avangard Omsk	KHL	47	18	30	48	21	13	3	4	7	10
2022–23	Avangard Omsk	KHL	58	15	19	34	14	14	5	5	10	8
2023–24	SC Bern	NL	41	11	14	25	4	1	0	0	0	0
AHL totals			299	67	112	179	144	28	2	8	10	14
NHL totals			52	4	8	12	4	—	—	—	—	—
KHL totals			222	71	91	162	53	56	13	21	34	20

=== International ===
Year	Team	Event	Result	GP	G	A	Pts	PIM
2022	Canada	OG	6th	5	2	1	3	0
Senior totals				5	2	1	3	0

== Awards and honours ==
Award	Year
AJHL
Rookie of the Year	2008–09
College
All-WCHA Second Team	2012–13
AHCA West Second-Team All-American	2012–13
NCAA West Region All-Tournament Team	2012–13
KHL
Gagarin Cup (Avangard Omsk)	2021
