= 2012–13 NCAA Division I men's ice hockey rankings =

- NCAA tournament: 2013
- NCAA champion: Yale
- Preseason No. 1 (USA Today): Boston College т Minnesota т
- Preseason No. 1 (USCHO): Minnesota
- NCAA Division I men's ice hockey rankings

Two human polls made up the 2012–13 NCAA Division I men's ice hockey rankings, the USCHO.com/CBS College Sports poll and the USA Today/USA Hockey Magazine poll. As the 2012–13 season progressed, rankings were updated weekly.

== Legend ==
	Increase in ranking
	Decrease in ranking
	Not ranked previous week
Italics	Number of first place votes
(#-#)	Win–loss–tie record
т	Tied with team above or below also with this symbol

== USCHO ==
	Preseason Sep 24	Week 1 Oct 8	Week 2 Oct 15	Week 3 Oct 22	Week 4 Oct 29	Week 5 Nov 5	Week 6 Nov 12	Week 7 Nov 19	Week 8 Nov 26	Week 9 Dec 3	Week 10 Dec 10	Week 11 Dec 17	Week 12 Dec 31	Week 13 Jan 7	Week 14 Jan 14	Week 15 Jan 21	Week 16 Jan 28	Week 17 Feb 4	Week 18 Feb 11	Week 19 Feb 18	Week 20 Feb 25	Week 21 Mar 4	Week 22 Mar 11	Week 23 Mar 18	Week 24 Mar 25	Final Apr 15	
1.	Boston College (35)	Boston College (0–0–0) (37)	Minnesota (2–0–0) (46)	Boston College (2–1–0) (27)	Boston College (4–1–0) (38)	Boston College (6–1–0) (48)	Boston College (8–1–0) (50)	Boston College (9–1–0) (47)	Boston College (10–1–0) (49)	New Hampshire (11–1–2) (31)	Boston College (11–2–1) (35)	Boston College (11–2–1) (44)	Minnesota (13–3–3) (35)	Minnesota (13–3–3) (38)	Minnesota (16–3–3) (47)	Minnesota (17–3–4) (48)	Minnesota (18–4–4) (28)	Minnesota (18–4–4) (30)	Quinnipiac (21–3–4) (41)	Quinnipiac (22–4–4) (34)	Quinnipiac (23–4–5) (37)	Quinnipiac (24–5–5) (36)	Quinnipiac (24–5–5) (39)	Minnesota (26–7–5) (22)	Quinnipiac (27–7–5) (26)	Yale (22–12–3) (47)	1.
2.	Minnesota (12)	Minnesota (0–0–0) (12)	North Dakota (0–0–0) (1)	Minnesota (3–1–0) (12)	Minnesota (4–1–0) (3)	Minnesota (5–2–0)	Denver (7–1–0)	Denver (9–1–0) (2)	New Hampshire (9–1–2) (1)	Boston College (11–2–0) (19)	New Hampshire (11–2–2) (9)	New Hampshire (11–2–2) (4)	Boston College (12–3–1) (5)	Notre Dame (14–4–0) (8)	Boston College (13–4–2)	Quinnipiac (17–3–3) (2)	Quinnipiac (18–3–3) (22)	Quinnipiac (19–3–4) (20)	Minnesota (19–5–4) (9)	Minnesota (20–6–4) (15)	Minnesota (21–6–5) (10)	Minnesota (22–7–5) (12)	Minnesota (24–7–5) (11)	Quinnipiac (26–6–5) (27)	Minnesota (26–8–5) (10)	Quinnipiac (30–8–5) (3)	2.
3.	Michigan (3)	Michigan (0–0–0) (1)	Boston College (0–1–0) (2)	Miami (3–0–1) (4)	Denver (4–0–0) (6)	Denver (5–1–0) (1)	Minnesota (6–2–1)	New Hampshire (8–1–1) (1)	Minnesota (9–2–2)	Miami (9–2–3)	Notre Dame (13–4–0) (3)	Notre Dame (14–4–0) (2)	Notre Dame (14–4–0) (9)	Boston College (12–3–2) (1)	New Hampshire (14–4–2) (1)	Boston College (14–5–2)	New Hampshire (15–6–2)	Miami (17–6–5)	Miami (18–7–5)	Miami (19–8–5)	Miami (21–8–5) (2)	Miami (22–9–5)	Miami (22–9–5)	Miami (24–10–5)	Massachusetts–Lowell (26–10–2) (14)	Massachusetts–Lowell (28–11–2)	3.
4.	North Dakota	North Dakota (0–0–0)	Miami (2–0–0)	North Dakota (1–1–0) (1)	Miami (4–1–1)	Cornell (3–0–1)	Miami (6–2–2)	Minnesota (7–2–2)	Miami (7–2–3)	Minnesota (10–3–2)	Minnesota (11–3–3) (3)	Minnesota (11–3–3)	New Hampshire (11–3–2)	New Hampshire (13–3–2) (1)	Quinnipiac (17–3–3) (2)	New Hampshire (14–5–2)	Miami (15–6–5)	New Hampshire (16–7–2)	Boston College (16–7–2)	Boston College (17–8–2) (1)	Boston College (18–8–3) (1)	New Hampshire (18–8–6)	North Dakota (19–10–7)	Boston College (22–10–4)	Notre Dame (25–12–3)	St. Cloud State (25–16–1)	4.
5.	Union	Cornell (0–0–0)	Michigan (1–1–0)	Denver (2–0–0) (3)	North Dakota (2–1–1)	Miami (5–2–1)	New Hampshire (6–1–1)	Miami (7–2–3)	Denver (9–3–0)	Notre Dame (11–4–0)	Miami (10–3–3)	Miami (11–3–4)	Quinnipiac (14–3–2)	Quinnipiac (16–3–2) (2)	Notre Dame (15–6–0)	North Dakota (13–7–4)	Boston College (14–7–2)	Boston College (15–7–2)	New Hampshire (16–7–3)	New Hampshire (16–8–4)	New Hampshire (17–8–5)	North Dakota (18–9–7)	Boston College (20–10–4)	Massachusetts–Lowell (24–10–2) (1)	Miami (24–11–5)	Miami (25–12–5)	5.
6.	Cornell	Massachusetts–Lowell (0–0–0)	Cornell (0–0–0)	Michigan (2–1–0)	Cornell (2–0–0)	North Dakota (3–2–1)	North Dakota (4–3–1)	Notre Dame (8–3–0)	Notre Dame (9–4–0)	Denver (9–4–1)	Boston University (10–5–0)	Boston University (10–5–0)	Miami (12–4–4)	Miami (12–4–4)	North Dakota (13–6–3)	Miami (13–6–5)	Western Michigan (16–6–4)	Western Michigan (17–6–5)	Western Michigan (18–7–5)	North Dakota (16–8–6)	North Dakota (17–9–6)	Boston College (19–10–3)	Massachusetts–Lowell (22–10–2)	North Dakota (21–11–7)	Boston College (22–11–4)	Minnesota (26–8–5)	6.
7.	Massachusetts–Lowell	Denver (0–0–0)	Denver (0–0–0)	Cornell (0–0–0) (1)	Notre Dame (5–1–0)	Notre Dame (6–2–0)	Union (6–2–1)	North Dakota (5–3–2)	North Dakota (6–4–2)	Boston University (8–5–0) т	Western Michigan (10–3–1)	North Dakota (10–5–3)	North Dakota (10–5–3)	North Dakota (12–5–3)	Denver (13–6–4)	Notre Dame (15–9–0)	North Dakota (13–8–5)	North Dakota (14–8–6)	North Dakota (16–8–6)	St. Cloud State (18–11–1)	St. Cloud State (19–12–1)	Massachusetts–Lowell (21–9–2) (2)	New Hampshire (18–9–7)	St. Cloud State (23–14–1)	North Dakota (21–12–7)	North Dakota (22–13–7)	7.
8.	Denver	Miami (0–0–0)	Union (2–1–0)	Union (2–1–0) (1)	Michigan (3–2–0)	Union (5–1–1) (1)	Notre Dame (6–3–0)	Union (6–2–1)	Union (8–2–1)	Western Michigan (8–3–1) т	North Dakota (8–5–3)	Western Michigan (11–4–1)	Dartmouth (8–2–2) (1)	Boston University (11–6–0)	Miami (12–5–5)	Yale (11–4–3)	Yale (12–5–3)	St. Cloud State (17–10–1)	St. Cloud State (18–11–1)	Western Michigan (18–8–6)	Western Michigan (18–8–8)	St. Cloud State (20–13–1)	St. Cloud State (21–14–1)	Minnesota State (24–11–3)	Wisconsin (22–12–7)	Notre Dame (25–13–3)	8.
9.	Miami	Western Michigan (0–0–0)	Notre Dame (2–0–0)	Notre Dame (3–1–0)	New Hampshire (4–0–1) (2)	New Hampshire (5–1–1)	Western Michigan (5–2–1)	Western Michigan (6–3–1)	Boston University (7–4–0)	North Dakota (7–5–2)	Quinnipiac (12–3–2)	Quinnipiac (12–3–2)	Boston University (10–6–0)	Denver (12–6–3)	Boston University (12–7–0)	Western Michigan (14–6–4)	Notre Dame (16–10–0)	Denver (15–8–4)	Minnesota State (18–9–3)	Minnesota State (20–9–3)	Minnesota State (20–9–3)	Western Michigan (19–9–8)	Western Michigan (19–9–8)	Notre Dame (23–12–3)	St. Cloud State (23–15–1)	Boston College (22–12–4)	9.
10.	Western Michigan	Union (0–1–0)	Massachusetts–Lowell (0–0–1)	Western Michigan (3–1–0)	Union (3–1–1) (1)	Western Michigan (4–2–0)	Cornell (3–2–1)	Boston University (6–4–0)	Western Michigan (6–3–1)	Dartmouth (6–2–2)	Dartmouth (7–2–2)	Dartmouth (7–2–2)	Western Michigan (11–5–2)	Western Michigan (12–5–3)	Western Michigan (13–5–4)	Denver (13–8–4)	Denver (13–8–4)	Yale (13–6–3)	Yale (13–6–3)	Denver (15–9–5)	Denver (16–10–5)	Minnesota State (21–10–3)	Minnesota State (22–11–3)	New Hampshire (19–11–7)	New Hampshire (19–11–7)	Union (22–13–5)	10.
11.	Ferris State	Ferris State (0–0–0)	Boston University (1–0–0)	Massachusetts–Lowell (1–1–1)	Western Michigan (3–1–0)	Boston University (4–2–0)	Boston University (5–3–0)	Dartmouth (5–1–2)	Dartmouth (5–2–2)	Cornell (6–3–2)	Denver (9–5–2)	Cornell (6–3–2)	Denver (10–6–3)	Minnesota State (14–6–2)	Dartmouth (9–5–2)	Boston University (12–9–0)	Boston University (13–9–1)	Minnesota State (16–9–3) т	Denver (15–9–5)	Notre Dame (19–12–1)	Notre Dame (19–12–3)	Notre Dame (21–12–3)	Denver (19–11–5)	Yale (18–10–3)	Minnesota State (24–13–3)	New Hampshire (20–12–7)	11.
12.	Minnesota–Duluth	Boston University (0–0–0)	Western Michigan (1–1–0)	New Hampshire (3–0–0)	Boston University (3–1–0)	Michigan (3–3–1)	Dartmouth (5–0–1)	St. Cloud State (6–4–0)	Cornell (4–3–2)	Union (8–3–2)	Cornell (6–3–2)	Omaha (11–6–1)	Cornell (7–4–2)	Dartmouth (8–5–2)	Yale (9–4–3)	Dartmouth (10–6–2)	St. Cloud State (15–10–1)	Notre Dame (16–11–1) т	Notre Dame (18–11–1)	Massachusetts–Lowell (16–9–2)	Massachusetts–Lowell (18–9–2)	Denver (17–11–5)	Notre Dame (21–12–3)	Western Michigan (19–11–8)	Denver (20–13–5)	Wisconsin (22–13–7)	12.
13.	Boston University	Minnesota–Duluth (0–0–0)	Minnesota–Duluth (1–1–0)	Boston University (1–1–0)	Harvard (1–0–0)	St. Lawrence (5–1–0)	Michigan (4–4–1)	Cornell (3–3–2)	Omaha (8–3–1)	Quinnipiac (10–3–2)	Omaha (10–5–1)	Union (8–3–4)	Union (9–4–4)	Omaha (13–8–1)	Omaha (13–9–2)	Omaha (13–9–2)	Massachusetts–Lowell (14–7–2)	Boston University (13–10–1)	Boston University (13–11–1)	Yale (13–9–3)	Omaha (18–12–2)	Yale (16–10–3)	Yale (16–10–3)	Denver (20–13–5)	Union (21–12–5)	Minnesota State (24–14–3)	13.
14.	Notre Dame	Notre Dame (0–0–0)	Northeastern (2–0–0)	Minnesota–Duluth (2–2–0)	Massachusetts–Lowell (1–3–1)	Harvard (2–1–0)	Colorado College (7–3–0)	Colorado College (7–5–0)	St. Cloud State (7–5–0)	Omaha (9–4–1)	Union (8–3–4)	Denver (9–6–3)	Minnesota State (12–6–2)	Yale (7–4–3)	Minnesota State (14–8–2)	Minnesota State (15–8–3)	Omaha (15–9–2)	Omaha (16–10–2)	Massachusetts–Lowell (14–9–2)	Omaha (18–12–2)	Niagara (21–6–5)	Wisconsin (16–11–7)	Wisconsin (17–12–7)	Wisconsin (19–12–7)	Niagara (23–9–5)	Denver (20–14–5)	14.
15.	Maine	Wisconsin (0–0–0)	New Hampshire (2–0–0)	Northeastern (2–1–0)	Northeastern (2–2–1)	St. Cloud State (5–3–0)	St. Cloud State (6–4–0)	Omaha (6–3–1)	Yale (5–2–1)	Yale (6–2–1)	Yale (6–3–2)	Yale (7–3–2)	St. Cloud State (12–8–0)	Cornell (7–6–2)	Niagara (13–3–4)	Massachusetts–Lowell (13–7–1)	Minnesota State (16–9–3)	Niagara (17–4–5)	Niagara (18–5–5)	Boston University (14–12–1)	Yale (14–10–3)	Niagara (21–8–5)	Niagara (21–8–5)	Niagara (23–8–5)	Yale (18–12–3)	Niagara (23–10–5)	15.
16.	Michigan State	Michigan State (0–0–0)	Ferris State (0–1–1)	Northern Michigan (3–1–0)	St. Lawrence (3–1–0)	Northern Michigan (4–3–1)	St. Lawrence (5–2–1)	Ferris State (6–4–2)	Quinnipiac (8–3–2)	Ferris State (7–4–3)	Niagara (10–2–3)	St. Cloud State (11–7–0)	Omaha (11–8–1)	Union (9–6–4)	Cornell (7–6–2)	St. Cloud State (14–10–0)	Dartmouth (11–7–2)	Massachusetts–Lowell (14–9–2)	Omaha (16–12–2)	Niagara (19–6–5)	Wisconsin (14–10–7)	Omaha (18–14–2)	Rensselaer (17–12–5)	Providence (17–13–7)	Western Michigan (19–11–8)	Western Michigan (19–11–8)	16.
17.	Harvard	Harvard (0–0–0)	Harvard (0–0–0) т	Harvard (0–0–0)	Minnesota–Duluth (2–3–1)	Massachusetts–Lowell (1–3–1)	Harvard (3–2–0)	Harvard (4–3–0)	Ferris State (6–4–2)	St. Cloud State (8–6–0)	St. Cloud State (9–7–0)	Niagara (10–2–4)	Yale (7–4–2)	Niagara (11–3–4)	Union (10–7–4)	Niagara (14–4–4)	Niagara (15–4–5)	Dartmouth (11–8–3)	Dartmouth (11–8–4)	Merrimack (14–10–6)	Merrimack (14–11–6)	Rensselaer (17–12–5)	Providence (15–12–7)	Boston University (20–15–2)	Boston University (21–16–2)	Boston University (21–16–2)	17.
18.	Wisconsin	Quinnipiac (1–0–0)	Northern Michigan (2–0–0) т	Ferris State (1–1–2)	St. Cloud State (4–2–0)	Ferris State (3–3–2)	Omaha (6–3–1)	Quinnipiac (7–3–1)	Colorado College (7–6–1)	Niagara (10–2–3)	Harvard (4–3–1)	Minnesota State (10–6–2)	Niagara (10–3–4)	St. Cloud State (12–10–0)	Massachusetts–Lowell (11–7–1)	Cornell (8–7–2)	Union (13–8–4)	Union (13–8–5)	Wisconsin (12–9–7)	Wisconsin (13–10–7)	Dartmouth (13–10–4)	Providence (14–11–7)	Boston University (18–15–2)	Union (19–12–5)	Providence (17–14–7)	Providence (17–14–7)	18.
19.	Air Force	Merrimack (1–0–0)	Colorado College (2–0–0)	Colorado College (3–1–0)	Ferris State (2–2–2)	Colorado College (5–3–0)	Northern Michigan (4–4–2)	Michigan (4–6–1)	Harvard (4–3–0)	Colorado College (8–7–1)	Ferris State (7–6–3)	Ferris State (7–7–3)	Robert Morris (9–4–2)	Colgate (11–7–2)	St. Cloud State (12–10–0)	Union (11–8–4)	Wisconsin (11–8–5)	Wisconsin (11–9–6)	Merrimack (13–10–5)	Dartmouth (12–9–4)	Boston University (14–14–2)	Boston University (16–15–2)	Union (17–12–5)	Rensselaer (18–14–5)	Michigan (18–19–3)	Canisius (19–19–5)	19.
20.	Colorado College	Maine (0–1–0)	Quinnipiac (2–1–0)	Quinnipiac (3–1–1)	Northern Michigan (3–3–0)	Minnesota–Duluth (2–3–1)	Ferris State (4–4–2)	Niagara (8–2–3)	Niagara (8–2–3)	Harvard (4–3–0)	Minnesota State (9–5–2)	Colgate (9–7–2) т Harvard (4–4–1) т	Holy Cross (10–4–2)	Massachusetts–Lowell (9–7–1)	Colgate (11–7–2)	Wisconsin (9–8–5)	Alaska (12–8–4)	Merrimack (12–10–5)	Alaska (13–11–4)	Union (15–10–5)	Providence (13–10–7)	Union (17–12–5)	Omaha (18–16–2)	Michigan (17–18–3)	Canisius (19–18–5)	Michigan (18–19–3)	20.
	Preseason Sep 24	Week 1 Oct 8	Week 2 Oct 15	Week 3 Oct 22	Week 4 Oct 29	Week 5 Nov 5	Week 6 Nov 12	Week 7 Nov 19	Week 8 Nov 26	Week 9 Dec 3	Week 10 Dec 10	Week 11 Dec 17	Week 12 Dec 31	Week 13 Jan 7	Week 14 Jan 14	Week 15 Jan 21	Week 16 Jan 28	Week 17 Feb 4	Week 18 Feb 11	Week 19 Feb 18	Week 20 Feb 25	Week 21 Mar 4	Week 22 Mar 11	Week 23 Mar 18	Week 24 Mar 25	Final Apr 15	
		Dropped: Air Force; Colorado College	Dropped: Maine; Merrimack; Michigan State; Wisconsin	None	Dropped: Colorado College; Quinnipiac	Dropped: Northeastern	Dropped: Massachusetts–Lowell; Minnesota–Duluth	Dropped: Northern Michigan; St. Lawrence	Dropped: Michigan	None	Dropped: Colorado College	None	Dropped: Colgate; Ferris State; Harvard	Dropped: Holy Cross; Robert Morris	None	Dropped: Colgate	Dropped: Cornell	Dropped: Alaska	Dropped: Union	Dropped: Alaska	Dropped: Union	Dropped: Dartmouth; Merrimack	None	Dropped: Omaha	Dropped: Rensselaer	None	

== USA Today/USA Hockey Magazine ==
	Preseason Sep 24	Week 1 Oct 8	Week 2 Oct 15	Week 3 Oct 22	Week 4 Oct 29	Week 5 Nov 5	Week 6 Nov 12	Week 7 Nov 19	Week 8 Nov 26	Week 9 Dec 3	Week 10 Dec 10	Week 11 Dec 17	Week 13 Jan 1	Week 14 Jan 7	Week 15 Jan 14	Week 16 Jan 21	Week 17 Jan 28	Week 18 Feb 4	Week 19 Feb 11	Week 20 Feb 18	Week 21 Feb 25	Week 22 Mar 4	Week 23 Mar 11	Week 24 Mar 18	Week 25 Mar 25	Week 26 Apr 1	Final Apr 15	
1.	Boston College (20) т	Minnesota (0–0–0) (14)	Minnesota (2–0–0) (30)	Boston College (2–1–0) (18)	Boston College (4–1–0) (28)	Boston College (6–1–0) (33)	Boston College (8–1–0) (34)	Boston College (9–1–0) (33)	Boston College (10–1–0) (33)	New Hampshire (11–1–2) (24)	Boston College (11–2–1) (22)	Boston College (11–2–1) (28)	Minnesota (13–3–3) (25)	Minnesota (13–3–3) (21)	Minnesota (16–3–3) (31)	Minnesota (17–3–4) (31)	Minnesota (18–4–4) (23)	Minnesota (18–4–4) (21)	Quinnipiac (21–3–4) (28)	Quinnipiac (22–4–4) (26)	Quinnipiac (23–4–5) (30)	Quinnipiac (24–5–5) (25)	Quinnipiac (24–5–5) (31)	Quinnipiac (26–6–5) (23)	Quinnipiac (27–7–5) (16) т	Quinnipiac (29–7–5) (22)	Yale (22–12–3) (34)	1.
2.	Minnesota (12) т	Boston College (0–0–0) (19)	North Dakota (0–0–0) (1)	Minnesota (3–1–0) (11)	Minnesota (4–1–0)	Minnesota (5–2–0)	Denver (7–1–0)	Denver (9–1–0) (1)	New Hampshire (9–1–2) (1)	Boston College (11–2–0) (10)	New Hampshire (11–2–2) (9)	New Hampshire (11–2–2) (5)	Notre Dame (14–4–0) (9)	Boston College (12–3–2) (5)	Boston College (13–4–2)	Quinnipiac (17–3–3) (3)	Quinnipiac (18–3–3) (11)	Quinnipiac (19–3–4) (13)	Minnesota (19–5–4) (6)	Minnesota (20–6–4) (8)	Minnesota (21–6–5) (3)	Minnesota (22–7–5) (8)	Minnesota (24–7–5) (3)	Minnesota (26–7–5) (11)	Minnesota (26–8–5) (9) т	Massachusetts–Lowell (28–10–2) (12)	Quinnipiac (30–8–5)	2.
3.	Michigan (2)	Michigan (0–0–0) (1)	Boston College (0–1–0) (1)	Miami (3–0–1) (3)	Denver (4–0–0) (5)	Denver (5–1–0)	Minnesota (6–2–1)	New Hampshire (8–1–1)	Minnesota (9–2–2)	Miami (9–2–3)	Notre Dame (13–4–0) (1)	Notre Dame (14–4–0) (1)	Boston College (12–3–1)	Notre Dame (14–4–0) (2)	New Hampshire (14–4–2)	Boston College (14–5–2)	Miami (15–6–5)	Miami (17–6–5)	Miami (18–7–5)	Miami (19–8–5)	Miami (21–8–5) (1)	Miami (22–9–5)	Miami (22–9–5)	Miami (24–10–5)	Massachusetts–Lowell (26–10–2) (9)	St. Cloud State (25–15–1)	Massachusetts–Lowell (28–11–2)	3.
4.	North Dakota	North Dakota (0–0–0)	Miami (2–0–0)	North Dakota (1–1–0)	Miami (4–1–1)	Cornell (3–0–1)	Miami (6–2–2)	Minnesota (7–2–2)	Miami (7–2–3)	Notre Dame (11–4–0)	Minnesota (11–3–3) (3)	Minnesota (11–3–3)	New Hampshire (12–3–2)	New Hampshire (13–3–2) (3)	Notre Dame (15–6–0)	New Hampshire (14–5–2)	New Hampshire (15–6–2)	Boston College (15–7–2)	Boston College (16–7–2)	Boston College (17–8–2)	Boston College (18–8–3)	New Hampshire (18–8–6)	North Dakota (19–10–7)	Boston College (22–10–4)	Notre Dame (25–12–3)	Yale (20–12–3)	St. Cloud State (25–16–1)	4.
5.	Union	Cornell (0–0–0)	Cornell (0–0–0)	Denver (2–0–0) (1)	Cornell (2–0–0)	Miami (5–2–1)	North Dakota (4–3–1)	Miami (7–2–3)	Denver (9–3–0)	Minnesota (10–3–2)	Miami (10–3–3)	Miami (11–3–4)	Quinnipiac (14–3–2)	Quinnipiac (16–3–2) (3)	Quinnipiac (17–3–3) (3)	North Dakota (13–7–4)	Boston College (14–7–2)	New Hampshire (16–7–2)	New Hampshire (16–7–3)	New Hampshire (16–8–4)	New Hampshire (17–8–5)	North Dakota (18–9–7)	Boston College (20–10–4)	Massachusetts–Lowell (24–10–2)	Miami (24–11–5)	Minnesota (26–8–5)	Minnesota (26–8–5)	5.
6.	Cornell	Massachusetts–Lowell (0–0–0)	Michigan (1–1–0)	Michigan (2–1–0)	North Dakota (2–1–1)	North Dakota (3–2–1)	New Hampshire (6–1–1)	Notre Dame (8–3–0)	Notre Dame (9–4–0)	Denver (9–4–1)	Boston University (10–5–0)	Boston University (10–5–0)	Miami (12–4–4)	Miami (12–4–4)	North Dakota (13–6–3)	Miami (13–6–5)	Western Michigan (16–6–4)	Western Michigan (17–6–5)	Western Michigan (18–7–5)	North Dakota (16–8–6)	North Dakota (17–9–6)	Boston College (19–10–3)	Massachusetts–Lowell (22–10–2)	North Dakota (21–11–7)	Boston College (22–11–4)	Miami (25–12–5)	Miami (25–12–5)	6.
7.	Massachusetts–Lowell	Western Michigan (0–0–0)	Union (2–1–0) (1)	Cornell (0–0–0)	Michigan (3–2–0)	Union (5–1–1) (1)	Notre Dame (6–3–0)	North Dakota (5–3–2)	Union (8–2–1)	Boston University (8–5–0)	Western Michigan (10–3–1)	Western Michigan (11–4–1)	North Dakota (10–5–3)	North Dakota (12–5–3)	Denver (13–6–4)	Yale (11–4–3)	Yale (12–5–3)	North Dakota (14–8–6)	North Dakota (16–8–6)	Western Michigan (18–8–6)	Minnesota State (20–9–3)	Massachusetts–Lowell (21–9–2) (1)	New Hampshire (18–9–7)	St. Cloud State (23–14–1)	North Dakota (21–12–7)	North Dakota (22–13–7)	North Dakota (22–13–7)	7.
8.	Denver	Miami (0–0–0)	Denver (0–0–0)	Union (2–1–0) (1)	Notre Dame (5–1–0)	Notre Dame (6–2–0)	Union (6–2–1)	Union (6–2–1)	North Dakota (6–4–2)	Western Michigan (8–3–1)	North Dakota (8–5–3)	North Dakota (10–5–3)	Dartmouth (8–3–2)	Boston University (11–6–0)	Miami (12–5–5)	Notre Dame (15–9–0)	North Dakota (13–8–5)	Denver (15–8–4)	St. Cloud State (18–11–1)	St. Cloud State (18–11–1)	Western Michigan (18–8–8)	St. Cloud State (20–13–1)	St. Cloud State (21–14–1)	Minnesota State (24–11–3)	Minnesota State (24–13–3) т	Notre Dame (25–13–3)	Boston College (22–12–4)	8.
9.	Miami	Union (0–1–0)	Massachusetts–Lowell (0–0–1)	Notre Dame (3–1–0)	Union (3–1–1) (1)	New Hampshire (5–1–1)	Western Michigan (5–2–1)	Western Michigan (6–3–1)	Boston University (7–4–0)	North Dakota (7–5–2)	Quinnipiac (12–3–2)	Quinnipiac (12–3–2)	Boston University (10–6–0)	Denver (12–6–3)	Boston University (12–7–0)	Western Michigan (14–6–4)	Boston University (13–9–1)	Yale (13–6–3)	Yale (13–6–3)	Minnesota State (20–9–3)	St. Cloud State (19–12–1)	Western Michigan (19–9–8)	Western Michigan (19–9–8)	Notre Dame (23–12–3)	Wisconsin (22–12–7) т	Boston College (22–12–4)	Notre Dame (25–13–3)	9.
10.	Notre Dame	Denver (0–0–0)	Notre Dame (2–0–0)	Western Michigan (3–1–0)	New Hampshire (4–0–1)	Western Michigan (4–2–0)	Cornell (3–2–1)	Boston University (6–4–0)	Western Michigan (6–3–1)	Dartmouth (6–2–2)	Denver (9–5–2)	Dartmouth (7–2–2)	Western Michigan (11–5–2)	Western Michigan (12–5–3)	Western Michigan (13–5–4)	Boston University (12–9–0)	Denver (13–8–4)	St. Cloud State (17–10–1)	Minnesota State (18–9–3)	Denver (15–9–5)	Massachusetts–Lowell (18–9–2)	Minnesota State (21–10–3)	Denver (19–11–5)	Yale (18–10–3)	New Hampshire (19–11–7)	Union (22–13–5)	Union (22–13–5)	10.
11.	Western Michigan	Ferris State (0–0–0)	Boston University (1–0–0)	New Hampshire (3–0–0)	Western Michigan (3–1–0)	Michigan (3–3–1)	Boston University (5–3–0)	Dartmouth (5–1–2)	Dartmouth (5–2–2)	Quinnipiac (10–3–2)	Dartmouth (7–2–2)	Cornell (6–3–2)	Denver (10–6–3)	Minnesota State (14–6–2)	Dartmouth (9–5–2)	Denver (13–8–4)	Notre Dame (16–10–0)	Boston University (13–10–1)	Denver (15–9–5)	Notre Dame (19–12–1)	Denver (16–10–5)	Denver (17–11–5)	Minnesota State (22–11–3)	New Hampshire (19–11–7)	St. Cloud State (23–15–1)	New Hampshire (20–12–7)	New Hampshire (20–12–7)	11.
12.	Minnesota–Duluth	Minnesota–Duluth (0–0–0)	Western Michigan (1–1–0)	Massachusetts–Lowell (1–1–1)	Boston University (3–1–0)	Boston University (4–2–0)	Dartmouth (5–0–1)	St. Cloud State (6–4–0)	Cornell (4–3–2)	Union (8–3–2)	Cornell (6–3–2)	Union (8–3–4)	Cornell (7–4–2)	Dartmouth (8–5–2)	Yale (9–4–3)	Massachusetts–Lowell (13–7–1)	Massachusetts–Lowell (14–7–2)	Notre Dame (16–11–1)	Notre Dame (18–11–1)	Massachusetts–Lowell (16–9–2)	Notre Dame (19–12–3)	Notre Dame (21–12–3)	Notre Dame (21–12–3)	Denver (20–13–5)	Denver (20–13–5)	Minnesota State (24–14–3)	Minnesota State (24–14–3)	12.
13.	Boston University	Notre Dame (0–0–0)	Minnesota–Duluth (1–1–0)	Boston University (1–1–0)	Harvard (1–0–0)	Harvard (2–1–0)	Michigan (4–4–1)	Cornell (3–3–2)	Yale (5–2–1)	Cornell (6–3–2)	Union (8–3–4)	Omaha (11–6–1)	Union (9–4–4)	Omaha (13–8–1)	Omaha (13–9–2)	Dartmouth (10–6–2)	St. Cloud State (15–10–1)	Minnesota State (16–9–3)	Boston University (13–11–1)	Boston University (14–12–1)	Niagara (21–6–5)	Yale (16–10–3)	Yale (16–10–3)	Western Michigan (19–11–8)	Union (21–12–5)	Wisconsin (22–13–7)	Wisconsin (22–13–7)	13.
14.	Ferris State	Boston University (0–0–0)	Ferris State (0–1–1)	Minnesota–Duluth (2–2–0)	Massachusetts–Lowell (1–3–1)	St. Lawrence (5–1–0)	Colorado College (7–3–0)	Omaha (6–3–1)	Omaha (8–3–1)	Omaha (9–4–1)	Omaha (10–5–1)	Yale (7–3–2)	Minnesota State (12–6–2)	Yale (7–4–3)	Minnesota State (14–8–2)	Omaha (13–9–2)	Omaha (15–9–2)	Niagara (17–4–5)	Niagara (18–5–5)	Yale (13–9–3)	Yale (14–10–3)	Wisconsin (16–11–7)	Niagara (21–8–5)	Niagara (23–8–5)	Niagara (23–9–5)	Denver (20–14–5)	Denver (20–14–5)	14.
15.	Wisconsin	Wisconsin (0–0–0)	Northern Michigan (2–0–0)	Northern Michigan (3–1–0)	St. Lawrence (3–1–0)	Massachusetts–Lowell (1–3–1)	St. Cloud State (6–4–0)	Harvard (4–3–0)	St. Cloud State (7–5–0)	Yale (6–2–1)	Yale (6–3–2)	Denver (9–6–3)	Omaha (11–8–1)	Cornell (7–6–2)	Massachusetts–Lowell (11–7–1)	St. Cloud State (14–10–0)	Minnesota State (16–9–3)	Omaha (16–10–2)	Massachusetts–Lowell (14–9–2)	Niagara (19–6–5)	Omaha (18–12–2)	Rensselaer (17–12–5)	Wisconsin (17–12–7)	Wisconsin (19–12–7)	Yale (18–12–3)	Niagara (23–10–5)	Niagara (23–10–5)	15.
	Preseason Sep 24	Week 1 Oct 8	Week 2 Oct 15	Week 3 Oct 22	Week 4 Oct 29	Week 5 Nov 5	Week 6 Nov 12	Week 7 Nov 19	Week 8 Nov 26	Week 9 Dec 3	Week 10 Dec 10	Week 11 Dec 17	Week 13 Jan 1	Week 14 Jan 7	Week 15 Jan 14	Week 16 Jan 21	Week 17 Jan 28	Week 18 Feb 4	Week 19 Feb 11	Week 20 Feb 18	Week 21 Feb 25	Week 22 Mar 4	Week 23 Mar 11	Week 24 Mar 18	Week 25 Mar 25	Week 26 Apr 1	Final Apr 15	
		None	Dropped: Wisconsin	Dropped: Ferris State	Dropped: Minnesota–Duluth; Northern Michigan	None	Dropped: Harvard; Massachusetts–Lowell; St. Lawrence	Dropped: Colorado College; Michigan	Dropped: Harvard	Dropped: St. Cloud State	None	None	Dropped: Yale	Dropped: Union	Dropped: Cornell	Dropped: Minnesota State	Dropped: Dartmouth	Dropped: Massachusetts–Lowell	Dropped: Omaha	None	Dropped: Boston University	Dropped: Niagara; Omaha	Dropped: Rensselaer	None	Dropped: Western Michigan	None	None	
