= 2011 ECAC Hockey men's ice hockey tournament =

2011 ECAC Men's ice hockey tournament
- Dates: March 4–19, 2011
- Teams: 12
- Finals site: Boardwalk Hall; Atlantic City, New Jersey
- Champions: Yale (2nd title)
- Winning coach: Keith Allain (2nd title)
- MVP: Ryan Rondeau (Yale)
- ECAC Men's Ice Hockey Tournaments

The 2011 ECAC Hockey Men's Ice Hockey Tournament was played between March 4 and March 19, 2011, at campus locations and at the Boardwalk Hall in Atlantic City, New Jersey, United States. Yale won its second ECAC Hockey Men's Ice Hockey Tournament and received ECAC Hockey's automatic bid to the 2011 NCAA Division I Men's Ice Hockey Tournament.

== Format ==
The tournament features four rounds of play. In the first round, the fifth and twelfth, sixth and eleventh, seventh and tenth, and eighth and ninth seeds as determined by the final regular season standings play a best-of-three series, with the winner advancing to the quarterfinals. There, the first seed and lowest-ranked first-round winner, the second seed and second-lowest-ranked first-round winner, the third seed and second-highest-ranked first-round winner, and the fourth seed and highest-ranked first-round winner play a best-of-three series, with the winner advancing to the semifinals. In the semifinals, the highest and lowest seeds and second-highest and second-lowest seeds play a single game, with the winner advancing to the championship game and the loser advancing to the third-place game. The tournament champion receives an automatic bid to the 2011 NCAA Men's Division I Ice Hockey Tournament.

=== Regular season standings ===
Note: GP = Games played; W = Wins; L = Losses; T = Ties; PTS = Points; GF = Goals For; GA = Goals Against

2010–11 ECAC Hockey standings
	Conference							Overall					
	GP	W	L	T	PTS	GF	GA	GP	W	L	T	GF	GA
#12 Union†	22	17	3	2	36	75	43	40	26	10	4	144	84
#6 Yale*	22	17	4	1	35	84	46	36	28	7	1	151	74
#15 Dartmouth	22	12	8	2	26	70	48	34	19	12	3	111	87
#20 Cornell	22	11	9	2	24	57	53	34	16	15	3	86	88
#16 Rensselaer	22	11	9	2	24	67	52	38	20	13	5	110	90
Princeton	22	11	9	2	24	69	70	32	17	13	2	105	88
Clarkson	22	9	12	1	19	58	78	36	15	19	2	98	117
Quinnipiac	22	6	9	7	19	49	62	39	16	15	8	95	102
Brown	22	8	12	2	18	55	70	31	10	16	5	83	107
Harvard	22	7	14	1	15	49	61	34	12	21	1	77	98
St. Lawrence	22	6	15	1	13	53	73	40	13	22	5	101	124
Colgate	22	4	15	3	11	51	81	42	11	28	3	107	142
Championship: March 19, 2009 † indicates conference regular season champion (Cleary Cup) * indicates conference tournament champion (Whitelaw Cup); Rankings: USCHO.com/CBS College Sports Top 20 Poll

== Bracket ==
First round March 4–6
5	Rensselaer	4	2	1
12	Colgate	2	5	2**
6	Princeton	4	2	1
11	St. Lawrence	1	3	2
7	Clarkson	1	4	—
10	Harvard	2	6	—
8	Quinnipiac	4	4	—
9	Brown	0	0	—

Quarterfinals; March 11–13
1	Union	4	2	3
12	Colgate	1	4	4
2	Yale	3	5	4
11	St. Lawrence	4*	2	0
3	Dartmouth	2	2	4
10	Harvard	3	1	3
4	Cornell	2	0	3
8	Quinnipiac	1	1	2

Semifinals; March 18
2	Yale	4
12	Colgate	0
3	Dartmouth	0
4	Cornell	3

Championship; March 19
2	Yale	6
4	Cornell	0
Third place
3	Dartmouth	5
12	Colgate	3

Note: * denotes overtime period(s)

=== First round ===
==== (5) Rensselaer vs. (12) Colgate ====
March 4	Rensselaer	4 - 2	Colgate	Houston Field House	Recap
Marty O'Grady - 01:15; Brock Higgs - pp - 15:00; Chase Polacek - pp - 17:26		First period	No scoring
No scoring		Second period	No scoring
Brock Higgs - 18:51		Third period	Austin Smith - 04:44; Jeremy Price - pp - 18:12
Allen York ( 24 saves / 26 shots )		Goalie stats	Erik Mihalik ( 23 saves / 27 shots )

March 5	Rensselaer	2 - 5	Colgate	Houston Field House	Recap
No scoring		First period	Nick Prockow - 01:51
Chase Polacek - sh - 05:56; Chase Polacek - pp - 18:56		Second period	Francois Brisebois - 09:16; Chris Wagner - 16:49
No scoring		Third period	Nick Prockow - en - 18:49; Francois Brisebois - pp - en - 19:57
Allen York ( 25 saves / 28 shots )		Goalie stats	Erik Mihalik ( 29 saves / 31 shots )

March 6	Rensselaer	1 - 2	2OT	Colgate	Houston Field House	Recap
No scoring		First period		Austin Mayer - sh - 13:08
Tyler Helfrich - 18:48		Second period		No scoring
No scoring		Third period		No scoring
No scoring		Second overtime period		Robbie Bourdon - 10:06
Allen York ( 37 saves / 39 shots )		Goalie stats		Erik Mihalik ( 40 saves / 41 shots )

Colgate wins series 2-1

==== (6) Princeton vs. (11) St. Lawrence ====
March 4	Princeton	4 - 1	St. Lawrence	Hobey Baker Memorial Rink	Recap
Andrew Calof - 01:40		First period	No scoring
Matt Arhontas - 06:18; Michael Sdao - pp - 07:39		Second period	Kyle Flanagan - pp - 11:34
Rob Kleebaum - 07:22		Third period	No scoring
Sean Bonar ( 22 saves / 23 shots )		Goalie stats	Robby Moss ( 12 saves / 15 shots ) Matt Weninger ( 20 saves / 21 shots )

March 5	Princeton	2 - 3	St. Lawrence	Hobey Baker Memorial Rink	Recap
Rob Kleebaum - 05:50		First period	Greg Carey - pp - 09:38
Andrew Calof - 04:13		Second period	Greg Carey - pp - 12:09
No scoring		Third period	Kyle Essery - 09:42
Sean Bonar ( 19 saves / 22 shots )		Goalie stats	Matt Weninger ( 28 saves / 30 shots )

March 6	Princeton	1 - 2	St. Lawrence	Hobey Baker Memorial Rink	Recap
No scoring		First period	Greg Carey - 05:27; Kyle Essery - 10:11
Derrick Pallis - pp - 12:57		Second period	No scoring
No scoring		Third period	No scoring
Sean Bonar ( 14 saves / 16 shots )		Goalie stats	Matt Weninger ( 48 saves / 49 shots )

St. Lawrence wins series 2-1

==== (7) Clarkson vs. (10) Harvard ====
March 4	Clarkson	1 - 2	Harvard	Cheel Arena	Recap
No scoring		First period	Danny Biega - 03:32
No scoring		Second period	No scoring
Alex Boak - 04:14		Third period	Michael Biega - 09:25
Paul Karpowich ( 16 saves / 18 shots )		Goalie stats	Ryan Carroll ( 32 saves / 33 shots )

March 5	Clarkson	4 - 6	Harvard	Cheel Arena	Recap
No Scoring		First period	No Scoring
Nik Pokulok - 02:29; Bryan Rufenach - 4x4 - 09:56; Brandon DeFazio - 13:51		Second period	Pier-Olivier Michaud - 04:00; Alex Fallstrom - 13:40
Ben Sexton - 7:29		Third period	Daniel Moriarty - pp - 02:28; Daniel Moriarty - pp - 03:12; Michael Biega - 07:01; Alex Killorn - 13:15
Paul Karpowich ( 36 saves / 42 shots )		Goalie stats	Ryan Carroll ( 29 saves / 33 shots )

Harvard wins series 2-0

==== (8) Quinnipiac vs. (9) Brown ====
March 4	Quinnipiac	4 - 0	Brown	TD Bank Sports Center	Recap
Jeremy Langlois - 00:15; Yuri Bouharevich - 12:56		First period	No scoring
Zach Hansen - 04:55; Kellen Jones - 4x4 - 05:57		Second period	No scoring
No scoring		Third period	No scoring
Dan Clarke ( 22 saves / 22 shots )		Goalie stats	Matt Clemente ( 8 saves / 12 shots ) Anthony Borelli (15 saves / 15 shots)

March 5	Quinnipiac	4 - 0	Brown	TD Bank Sports Center	Recap
No scoring		First period	No scoring
Zack Currie - pp - 00:35; Jeremy Langlois - 02:25		Second period	No scoring
Zach Hansen - 10:55; Ben Arnt - 14:07		Third period	No scoring
Eric Hartzell ( 26 saves / 26 shots )		Goalie stats	Matt Clemente ( 22 saves / 25 shots ) Anthony Borelli ( 6 saves / 7 shots )

Quinnipiac wins series 2-0

=== Quarterfinals ===
==== (1) Union vs. (12) Colgate ====
March 11	Union	4 - 1	Colgate	Achilles Rink	Recap
Andrew Boute - 03:46; Wayne Simpson - pp - 15:12		First period	No scoring
No scoring		Second period	Chris Wagner - 13:09
Matt Hatch - 03:02; Wayne Simpson - pp - 19:21		Third period	No scoring
Keith Kinkaid - ( 19 saves / 20 shots )		Goalie stats	Erik Mihalik - ( 38 saves / 42 shots )

March 12	Union	2 - 4	Colgate	Achilles Rink	Recap
Wayne Simpson - 05:21		First period	No scoring
Mat Bodie - 08:01		Second period	No scoring
No scoring		Third period	Austin Mayer - 05:48; Chris Wagner - pp - 11:06; Robbie Bourdon - 14:48; Brian Day - en - 19:22
Keith Kinkaid - ( 18 saves / 21 shots )		Goalie stats	Erik Mihalik - ( 27 saves / 29 shots )

March 13	Union	3 - 4	OT	Colgate	Achilles Rink	Recap
Andrew Buote - 12:02		First period		No Scoring
Jeremy Welsh - PP - 05:15		Second period		Austin Smith - PP - 02:59; Kurtis Bartliff - PP - 13:01
Kelly Zajac - 13:03		Third period		Francois Brisebois - 17:33
No scoring		First overtime period		Wade Poplawski - 12:52
Keith Kinkaid - ( 29 saves / 33 shots )		Goalie stats		Erik Mihalik - ( 34 saves / 37 shots )

Colgate Wins Series 2-1

==== (2) Yale vs. (11) St. Lawrence ====
March 11	Yale	3 - 4	OT	St. Lawrence	Ingalls Rink	Recap
Denny Kearney - pp - 03:10; Jimmy Martin - pp - 08:15		First period		Patrick Raley - 00:53
Jimmy Martin - pp - 03:58		Second period		No scoring
No scoring		Third period		Aaron Bogosian - 06:27; Greg Carey - pp - 13:47
No scoring		First overtime period		Greg Carey - 16:28
Ryan Rondeau - ( 25 saves / 29 shots )		Goalie stats		Matt Weninger - ( 31 saves / 34 shots )

March 12	Yale	5 - 2	St. Lawrence	Ingalls Rink	Recap
Denny Kearney - 15:12		First period	Kyle Flanagan - pp - 19:58
Kevin Limbert - 08:37; Clinton Bourbonais - 11:56; Kevin Peel - 13:47		Second period	Nick Pitsikoulis - 17:41
Broc Little - pp - 08:38		Third period	No scoring
Ryan Rondeau - ( 29 saves / 31 shots )		Goalie stats	Matt Weninger - ( 28 saves / 33 shots )

March 13	Yale	4 - 0	St. Lawrence	Ingalls Rink	Recap
Chris Cahill - pp - 02:41; Brian O'Neill - pp - 07:24		First period	No scoring
Kevin Limbert - 04:44; Broc Little - 05:48		Second period	No scoring
No scoring		Third period	No scoring
Ryan Rondeau - ( 21 saves / 21 shots )		Goalie stats	Matt Weninger - ( 38 saves / 42 shots )

Yale Wins Series 2-1

==== (3) Dartmouth vs. (10) Harvard ====
March 11	Dartmouth	2 - 3	Harvard	Thompson Arena	Recap
Adam Estoclet - 16:00		First period	Alex Killorn - pp - 05:39; Ryan Grimshaw - 17:15
No scoring		Second period	Michael Del Mauro - 18:49
Scott Fleming - 18:34		Third period	No scoring
James Mello - ( 28 saves / 31 shots )		Goalie stats	Ryan Carroll - ( 27 saves / 29 shots )

March 12	Dartmouth	2 - 1	OT	Harvard	Thompson Arena	Recap
Adam Estoclet - 13:56		First period		No scoring
No scoring		Second period		No scoring
No scoring		Third period		Michael Biega - pp - 11:12
Andrew Owsiak - 01:37		First overtime period		No scoring
James Mello - ( 24 saves / 25 shots )		Goalie stats		Ryan Carroll - ( 25 saves / 27 shots )

March 13	Dartmouth	4 - 3	Harvard	Thompson Arena	Recap
No scoring		First period	Alex Fallstrom - 07:15
Doug Jones - pp - 00:56		Second period	No scoring
Matt Lindblad - 07:07; Evan Stephens - 13:43; Matt Lindblad - pp - 16:50		Third period	Michael Del Mauro - 04:54; Alex Fallstrom - pp - 19:40
James Mello - ( 35 saves / 38 shots )		Goalie stats	Ryan Carroll - ( 27 saves / 31 shots )

Dartmouth Wins Series 2-1

==== (4) Cornell vs. (8) Quinnipiac ====
March 11	Cornell	2 - 1	Quinnipiac	Lynah Rink	Recap
Joe Devin - 01:58		First period	Scott Zurevinski - 18:36
Joe Devin - pp - 19:35		Second period	No scoring
No scoring		Third period	No scoring
Mike Garman - ( 36 saves / 37 shots )		Goalie stats	Dan Clarke - ( 25 saves / 27 shots )

March 12	Cornell	0 - 1	Quinnipiac	Lynah Rink	Recap
No scoring		First period	Jeremy Langlois - 14:12
No scoring		Second period	No scoring
No scoring		Third period	No scoring
Andy Iles - ( 30 saves / 31 shots )		Goalie stats	Eric Hartzell - ( 24 saves / 24 shots )

March 13	Cornell	3 - 2	OT	Quinnipiac	Lynah Rink	Recap
Patrick Kennedy - pp - 03:13		First period		No scoring
Joe Devin - 12:30		Second period		No scoring
No scoring		Third period		Scott Zurevinski - 08:56; Yuri Bouharevich - 13:47
Joe Devin - 10:41		First overtime period		No scoring
Mike Garman - ( 37 saves / 39 shots )		Goalie stats		Eric Hartzell - ( 29 saves / 32 shots )

Cornell Wins Series 2-1

=== Semifinals ===
==== (2) Yale vs. (12) Colgate ====
March 18	Yale	4 - 0	Colgate	Boardwalk Hall	Recap
No scoring		First period	No scoring
Chris Cahill - 05:07		Second period	No scoring
Kenny Agostino - 06:42; Andrew Miller - 14:49; Antoine Laganiere - en - 19:45		Third period	No scoring
Ryan Rondeau - ( 22 saves / 22 shots )		Goalie stats	Eric Mihalik - ( 36 saves / 39 shots )

==== (3) Dartmouth vs. (4) Cornell ====
March 18	Dartmouth	0 - 3	Cornell	Boardwalk Hall	Recap
No scoring		First period	Sean Whitney - 18:05; Armand de Swardt - 18:29
No scoring		Second period	No scoring
No scoring		Third period	Locke Jillson - en - 18:59
James Mello - ( 15 saves / 17 shots )		Goalie stats	Mike Garman - ( 36 saves / 36 shots )

=== 3rd Place Game ===
==== (3) Dartmouth vs. (12) Colgate ====
March 19	Dartmouth	5 - 3	Colgate	Boardwalk Hall	Recap
(Lindblad, Walsh) Connor Goggin - PP - 14:35 (Estoclet) Matt Lindblad - PP - 19:41		First period	07:41 - Robbie Bourdon (Poplawski, Larkin)
(Stephens, Reeds) Robbie Smith - 02:41 (Fleming) Adam Estoclet - GW - 15:49		Second period	12:57 - PP - Francis Brisbois (Bartliff, Smith)
(Lindblad) Dustin Walsh - 08:51		Third period	16:01 - Robbie Bourdon (Leidl, Day)
( 20 saves / 23 shots ) James Mello		Goalie stats	Eric Mihalik ( 29 saves / 34 shots )

=== Championship ===
==== (2) Yale vs. (4) Cornell ====
March 19	Yale	6 - 0	Cornell	Boardwalk Hall	Recap
(Kearney, Martin) Kevin Limbert - PP GW - 03:03 (Martin, Kearney) Kevin Limbert - PP - 15:50		First period	No scoring
(O'Neill, Miller) Antoine Laganière - 01:39 (O'Neill) Chris Cahill - 06:00 (Miller, Peel) Colin Dueck - 08:37 (Kearney) Broc Little - PP - 17:28		Second period	No scoring
No scoring		Third period	No scoring
( 22 saves / 22 shots ) Ryan Rondeau		Goalie stats	Andy Iles ( 10 saves / 15 shots ) / Mike Garman ( 17 saves / 18 shots )

== Tournament awards ==
=== All-Tournament Team ===
- F Chris Cahill (Yale)
- F Andrew Miller (Yale)
- F Brian O’Neill (Yale)
- D Connor Goggin (Dartmouth)
- D Jimmy Martin (Yale)
- G Ryan Rondeau* (Yale)

* Most Outstanding Player(s)
