= 2012 ECAC Hockey men's ice hockey tournament =

2012 ECAC Men's ice hockey tournament
- 2012 ECAC Hockey Men's Ice Hockey Tournament logo
- Dates: March 2–17, 2012
- Teams: 12
- Finals site: Boardwalk Hall; Atlantic City, New Jersey
- Champions: Union (1st title)
- Winning coach: Rick Bennett (1st title)
- MVP: Jeremy Welsh (Union)
- ECAC Men's Ice Hockey Tournaments

The 2012 ECAC Hockey Men's Ice Hockey Tournament was played between March 2 and March 17, 2012 at campus locations and at Boardwalk Hall in Atlantic City, New Jersey, United States. The winner of the tournament received ECAC Hockey's automatic bid to the 2012 NCAA Division I Men's Ice Hockey Tournament.

== Format ==
The tournament features four rounds of play. In the first round, the fifth and twelfth, sixth and eleventh, seventh and tenth, and eighth and ninth seeds as determined by the final regular season standings play a best-of-three series, with the winner advancing to the quarterfinals. There, the first seed and lowest-ranked first-round winner, the second seed and second-lowest-ranked first-round winner, the third seed and second-highest-ranked first-round winner, and the fourth seed and highest-ranked first-round winner play a best-of-three series, with the winner advancing to the semifinals. In the semifinals, the highest and lowest seeds and second-highest and second-lowest seeds play a single game, with the winner advancing to the championship game and the loser advancing to the third-place game. The tournament champion receives an automatic bid to the 2012 NCAA Men's Division I Ice Hockey Tournament.

=== Regular season standings ===
Note: GP = Games Played; W = Wins; L = Losses; T = Ties; PTS = Points; GF = Goals For; GA = Goals Against

2011–12 ECAC Hockey standings
| | Conference | | | | | | | Overall | | | | | |
| | GP | W | L | T | PTS | GF | GA | GP | W | L | T | GF | GA |
|---|---|---|---|---|---|---|---|---|---|---|---|---|---|
| #3 Union†* | 22 | 14 | 4 | 4 | 32 | 76 | 38 | 41 | 26 | 8 | 7 | 143 | 75 |
| #10 Cornell | 22 | 12 | 4 | 6 | 30 | 66 | 46 | 35 | 19 | 9 | 7 | 100 | 79 |
| #18 Harvard | 22 | 8 | 5 | 9 | 25 | 61 | 59 | 34 | 13 | 10 | 11 | 106 | 100 |
| Colgate | 22 | 11 | 10 | 1 | 23 | 60 | 57 | 39 | 19 | 17 | 3 | 121 | 113 |
| Quinnipiac | 22 | 9 | 8 | 5 | 23 | 60 | 57 | 40 | 20 | 14 | 6 | 122 | 98 |
| Yale | 22 | 10 | 10 | 2 | 22 | 74 | 61 | 35 | 16 | 16 | 3 | 123 | 106 |
| Clarkson | 22 | 9 | 9 | 4 | 22 | 57 | 60 | 39 | 16 | 17 | 6 | 105 | 109 |
| St. Lawrence | 22 | 10 | 11 | 1 | 21 | 50 | 64 | 36 | 14 | 19 | 3 | 88 | 120 |
| Dartmouth | 22 | 8 | 11 | 3 | 19 | 63 | 74 | 33 | 13 | 16 | 4 | 93 | 102 |
| Rensselaer | 22 | 7 | 12 | 3 | 17 | 43 | 61 | 39 | 12 | 24 | 3 | 78 | 111 |
| Princeton | 22 | 6 | 12 | 4 | 16 | 58 | 72 | 32 | 9 | 16 | 7 | 85 | 105 |
| Brown | 22 | 5 | 13 | 4 | 14 | 54 | 75 | 32 | 9 | 18 | 5 | 75 | 97 |
Championship: Union 3, Harvard 1 † indicates conference regular season champion (Cleary Cup) * indicates conference tournament champion (Whitelaw Cup); Rankings: USCHO.com Top 20 Poll

== Bracket ==
First round March 2–4
5 | Quinnipiac | 1 | 3 | 4
12 | Brown | 4 | 0 | 2
6 | Yale | 4 | 4 | 7
11 | Princeton | 2 | 5* | 3
7 | Clarkson | 1 | 4*** | 1
10 | Rensselaer | 5 | 3 | 4
8 | St. Lawrence | 3 | 1 | —
9 | Dartmouth | 6 | 4 | —

Quarterfinals; March 9–11
1 | Union | 3 | 4 | —
10 | Rensselaer | 2 | 2 | —
2 | Cornell | 4** | 3 | —
9 | Dartmouth | 3 | 1 | —
3 | Harvard | 1 | 4** | 8
6 | Yale | 2* | 3 | 2
4 | Colgate | 4 | 2 | 4
5 | Quinnipiac | 2 | 4 | 0

Semifinals; March 16
1 | Union | 6
4 | Colgate | 2
2 | Cornell | 1
3 | Harvard | 6

Championship; March 17
1 | Union | 3
3 | Harvard | 1
Third place
2 | Cornell | 3
4 | Colgate | 0

Note: * denotes overtime period(s)

=== First round ===
==== (5) Quinnipiac vs. (12) Brown ====
| March 2 | Quinnipiac | 1 - 4 | Brown | TD Bank Sports Center | Recap |
| (C. Jones, Peca) Zack Currie - PP - 12:53 | | First period | 17:44 - Jarred Smith (Quick, Zaires) |
| No scoring | | Second period | 08:51 - GW - Ryan Jacobson (Maclellan, Lorito) |
| No scoring | | Third period | 17:12 - Chris Zaires (Quick, Smith); 17:42 - EN - Bobby Farnham (Jacobson, Robertson) |
| ( 26 saves / 29 shots ) Eric Hartzell | | Goalie stats | Mike Clemente ( 25 saves / 26 shots ) |

| March 3 | Quinnipiac | 3 - 0 | Brown | TD Bank Sports Center | Recap |
| (Peca, K. Jones) Connor Jones - GW PP - 02:11 (Peca, K. Jones) Loren Baron - 10:05 | | First period | No scoring |
| No scoring | | Second period | No scoring |
| (Currie, K. Jones) Matthew Peca - PP - 06:44 | | Third period | No scoring |
| ( 16 saves / 16 shots ) Eric Hartzell | | Goalie stats | Mike Clemente ( 39 saves / 42 shots ) |

| March 4 | Quinnipiac | 4 - 2 | Brown | TD Bank Sports Center | Recap |
| (Peca) Kellen Jones - PP - 01:16 (Van Brabant, Dalhuisen) Kevin Bui - 09:29 | | First period | No scoring |
| (Heichman, Currie) Clay Harvey - GW - 16:35 | | Second period | No scoring |
| (unassisted) Yuri Bouharevich - EN - 19:45 | | Third period | 02:34 - PP - Bobby Farnham (Buvinow, Crowley); 03:43 - Matt Harlow (Buvinow, Hourihan) |
| ( 35 saves / 37 shots ) Eric Hartzell | | Goalie stats | Mike Clemente ( 29 saves / 32 shots ) |

| Quinnipiac wins series 2-1 |

==== (6) Yale vs. (11) Princeton ====
| March 2 | Yale | 4 - 2 | Princeton | Ingalls Rink | Recap |
| (Root, Dueck) Brian O'Neill - 06:12 (Root) Colin Dueck - 16:38 | | First period | No scoring |
| (Bourbonais, Agostino) Nick Jaskowiak - GW PP - 16:27 | | Second period | 14:28 - PP - Rob Kleebaum (Meland, Hagel) |
| (unassisted) Antoine Laganière - EN - 19:00 | | Third period | 04:20 - Jack Berger (Hagel, Kleebaum) |
| ( 25 saves / 27 shots ) Nick Maricic | | Goalie stats | Sean Bonar ( 29 saves / 32 shots ) |

| March 3 | Yale | 4 - 5 | OT | Princeton | Ingalls Rink | Recap |
| No Scoring | | First period | | 05:01 - Rob Kleebaum (Hagel, Berger) |
| No scoring | | Second period | | 18:35 - PP - Andrew Calof (Kleebaum, Meland) |
| (Jaskowiak, Agostino) Kevin Peel - PP - 06:33 (Dueck) Jesse Root - SH - 12:31 (Fallen, O'Neill) Antoine Laganière - PP - 14:00 (O'Neill, Fallen) Andrew Miller - PP - 17:36 | | Third period | | 09:08 - Rob Kleebaum (Hagel, MacDonald); 14:27 - Michael Sdao (MacDonald, Brockett) |
| No scoring | | First overtime period | | 00:33 - Andrew Calof (Ammon) |
| ( 26 saves / 31 shots ) Nick Maricic | | Goalie stats | | Sean Bonar ( 38 saves / 42 shots ) |

| March 4 | Yale | 7 - 3 | Princeton | Ingalls Rink | Recap |
| (Agostino) Anthony Day - 04:52 (Young) Antoine Laganière - SH - 07:55 (Agostino, Young) Anthony Day - 10:23 | | First period | 16:13 - Andrew Calof (Rush) |
| (Limbert, Miller) Antoine Laganière - GW - 12:10 (O'Neill, Root) Antoine Laganière - PP - 16:53 | | Second period | 15:39 - Andrew Calof (Pallis) |
| (Miller) Brian O'Neill - EN - 12:10 (Peel, Dueck) Clinton Bourbonais - PP - 18:50 | | Third period | 00:56 - Michael Sdao (Calof, Meland) |
| ( 27 saves / 30 shots ) Jeff Malcolm | | Goalie stats | Sean Bonar ( 35 saves / 41 shots ) |

| Yale wins series 2-1 |

==== (7) Clarkson vs. (10) Rensselaer ====
| March 2 | Clarkson | 1 - 5 | Rensselaer | Cheel Arena | Recap |
| (McPherson, Labrecque) Nick Tremblay - PP - 03:25 | | First period | 05:44 - PP EA - Matt Tinordi (Haggerty, Lee); 06:33 - GW PP - Nick Bailen (Bergin, Neal); 09:39 - PP - Nick Bailen (Lalibertè, Bergin); 12:17 - Joel Malchuk (Leboeuf, O'Grady) |
| No scoring | | Second period | 17:32 - Jacob Lalibertè (Haggerty, Neal) |
| No scoring | | Third period | No scoring |
| ( 27 saves / 32 shots ) Paul Karpowich | | Goalie stats | Bryce Merrian ( 16 saves / 17 shots ) |

| March 3 | Clarkson | 4 - 3 | 3OT | Rensselaer | Cheel Arena | Recap |
| (Labrecque, Sexton) Nick Tremblay - PP - 15:56 | | First period | | 08:43 - PP - C. J. Lee (Cullen) |
| No scoring | | Second period | | 06:47 - Patrick Cullen (Tinordi, Higgs) |
| (Zarbo, Tamblyn) Alex Boak - PP - 06:25 (unassisted) Sam Labrecque - 15:01 | | Third period | | 11:00 - Patrick Cullen (Dolan, Schroeder) |
| (McPherson, Pokulok) Ben Sexton - GW - 13:48 | | Third overtime period | | No scoring |
| ( 50 saves / 53 shots ) Paul Karpowich | | Goalie stats | | Bryce Merrian ( 40 saves / 44 shots ) |

| March 4 | Clarkson | 1 - 4 | Rensselaer | Cheel Arena | Recap |
| No Scoring | | First period | No scoring |
| (Tremblay, Morley) Sam Labrecque - PP - 08:03 | | Second period | 13:02 - Ryan Haggerty (Bailen, Leboeuf) |
| No scoring | | Third period | 04:14 - Mike Bergin (Higgs, McGowan); 05:47 - Joel Malchuk (Leonard, Dolan); 18:28 - Marty O'Grady (Lee, Bailen) |
| ( 26 saves / 29 shots ) Paul Karpowich | | Goalie stats | Bryce Merrian ( 23 saves / 24 shots ) |

| Rensselaer wins series 2-1 |

==== (8) St. Lawrence vs. (9) Dartmouth ====
| March 2 | St. Lawrence | 3 - 6 | Dartmouth | Appleton Arena | Recap |
| No Scoring | | First period | 19:08 - Nick Walsh (Lee, Pinkston) |
| (Carden) Mark Armstrong - 09:54 (Mobley, Drewiske) Tommy Thompson - 10:19 | | Second period | 02:52 - Connor Goggin (Walsh, Keenan) |
| (Flanagan, Martin) Greg Carey - 02:41 | | Third period | 02:29 - PP - Doug Jones (Keenan); 11:15 - GW - Eric Neiley (Sikura, Keenan); 12:39 - Jason Bourgea (Mosey); 15:21 - Matt Lindblad (Sikura) |
| ( 20 saves / 26 shots ) Matt Weninger | | Goalie stats | Jody O'Neill ( 30 saves / 33 shots ) |

| March 3 | St. Lawrence | 1 - 4 | Dartmouth | Appleton Arena | Recap |
| No Scoring | | First period | 04:27 - Andy Simpson (Lindblad, Neiley); 07:24 - GW - Matt Lindblad (Sikura, Neiley) |
| (Flanagan, Hughes) Greg Carey - 02:29 | | Second period | 15:02 - Doug Jones (Robinson) |
| No scoring | | Third period | 19:03 - Nick Walsh (unassisted) |
| ( 18 saves / 21 shots ) Matt Weninger | | Goalie stats | Jody O'Neill ( 38 saves / 39 shots ) |

| Dartmouth wins series 2-0 |

=== Quarterfinals ===
==== (1) Union vs. (10) Rensselaer ====
| March 9 | Union | 3 - 2 | Rensselaer | Achilles Rink | Recap |
| (Hatch, Julseth-White) Max Novak - 06:32 (Bodie, Zajac) Wayne Simpson - PP - 13:19 | | First period | 00:42 - Matt Tinordi (McGowan, Leboeuf) |
| (Bodie, Zajac) Greg Coburn - GW PP - 10:19 | | Second period | No scoring |
| No scoring | | Third period | 10:32 - SH - Alex Angers-Goulet (Bergin, Leonard) |
| ( 21 saves / 23 shots ) Troy Grosenick | | Goalie stats | Bryce Merriam ( 24 saves / 27 shots ) |

| March 10 | Union | 4 - 2 | Rensselaer | Achilles Rink | Recap |
| (Gostisbehere, Simpson) Kyle Bodie - PP - 10:14 (Carr, Jooris) Jeremy Welsh - 14:03 | | First period | No scoring |
| (Stuart, Bodie) [Kevin Sullivan - GW - 17:37 | | Second period | 15:03 - Brock Higgs (Cullen, Bergin); 16:36 - PP - Matt Neal (Lalibertè, Bergin) |
| (Bodie, Coburn) Kevin Sullivan - 05:58 | | Third period | No scoring |
| ( 28 saves / 30 shots ) Troy Grosenick | | Goalie stats | Bryce Merriam ( 20 saves / 24 shots ) |

| Union Wins Series 2-0 |

==== (2) Cornell vs. (9) Dartmouth ====
| March 9 | Cornell | 4 - 3 | 2OT | Dartmouth | Lynah Rink | Recap |
| (Miller, Mowrey) John Esposito - 06:10 (D'Agostino, Ryan) John Esposito - PP - 10:20 (Miller, Gotovets) Dustin Mowrey - 18:11 | | First period | | 02:20 - PP - Tyler Sikura (Lindblad); 14:18 - PP - Connor Goggin (Sikura, Lindblad) |
| No scoring | | Second period | | 12:32 - Kyle Schussler (Mosey, Bourgea) |
| No scoring | | Third period | | No scoring |
| (de Swardt, Gotovets) Sean Whitney - GW - 17:40 | | Second overtime period | | No scoring |
| ( 46 saves / 49 shots ) Andy Iles | | Goalie stats | | Jody O'Neill ( 45 saves / 49 shots ) |

| March 10 | Cornell | 3 - 1 | Dartmouth | Lynah Rink | Recap |
| (Esposito, Miller) Dustin Mowrey - 01:07 (Axell, Ryan) Locke Jillson - GW - 05:42 (Lowry, Collins) Sean Whitney - PP - 08:21 | | First period | 11:29 - Charlie Mosey (Simpson, Goggin) |
| No scoring | | Second period | No scoring |
| No scoring | | Third period | No scoring |
| ( 27 saves / 28 shots ) Andy Iles | | Goalie stats | Jody O'Neill ( 4 saves / 7 shots ) / James Mello ( 23 saves / 23 shots ) |

| Cornell Wins Series 2-0 |

==== (3) Harvard vs. (6) Yale ====
| March 9 | Harvard | 1 - 2 | OT | Yale | Bright Hockey Center | Recap |
| No Scoring | | First period | | 15:50 - Trent Ruffolo (Bourbonais, Day) |
| (Biega, Kroshus) Luke Greiner - 19:33 | | Second period | | No scoring |
| No scoring | | Third period | | No scoring |
| No scoring | | First overtime period | | 03:49 - GW - Kenny Agostino (Laganière, Peel) |
| ( 42 saves / 44 shots ) Raphaël Girard | | Goalie stats | | Nick Maricic ( 32 saves / 33 shots ) |

| March 10 | Harvard | 4 - 3 | 2OT | Yale | Bright Hockey Center | Recap |
| No Scoring | | First period | | 05:17 - Colin Dueck (Ziegler); 16:36 - Chad Ziegler (Miller) |
| (Killorn, McNally) Danny Biega - PP - 08:09 (Fallstrom, McNally) Marshall Everson - PP - 16:07 | | Second period | | No scoring |
| (Killorn, McNally) Danny Biega - PP - 11:20 | | Third period | | 19:33 - Antoine Laganière (Bourbonais, Peel) |
| (Morrison, Moore) Dan Ford - GW - 09:20 | | Second overtime period | | No scoring |
| ( 48 saves / 51 shots ) Raphaël Girard | | Goalie stats | | Nick Maricic ( 49 saves / 53 shots ) |

| March 11 | Harvard | 8 - 2 | Yale | Bright Hockey Center | Recap |
| (Everson) Alex Killorn - 06:49 | | First period | 04:06 - Chad Ziegler (Bourbonais, Weberg) |
| (Killorn, Everson) Alex Fallstrom - 00:35 (Morrinson, O'Regan) David Valek - GW - 10:00 (Grimshaw) Alex Killorn - 12:26 (Killorn, Fallstrom) Marshall Everson - 17:15 | | Second period | No scoring |
| (McNally, O'Regan) David Valek - 11:20 (Biega, Everson) Daniel Moriarty - PP - 15:10 (Moriarty, Moore) David Valek - PP - 19:41 | | Third period | 10:41 - PP - Antoine Laganière (O'Neill, Miller) |
| ( 39 saves / 41 shots ) Raphaël Girard | | Goalie stats | Nick Maricic ( 28 saves / 33 shots ) / Jeff Malcolm ( 3 saves / 5 shots ) / Connor Wilson ( 2 saves / 3 shots ) |

| Harvard Wins Series 2-1 |

==== (4) Colgate vs. (5) Quinnipiac ====
| March 9 | Colgate | 4 - 2 | Quinnipiac | Starr Arena | Recap |
| (Goulakos) Austin Smith - 03:15 | | First period | 15:35 - PP - Connor Jones (K. Jones, Baron) |
| (Wilson, Sinz) Chris Wagner - 00:14 | | Second period | 15:50 - PP - Connor Jones (Peca, Baron) |
| (Wilson, Smith) Chris Wagner - GW PP - 11:32 (Mayer, Sinz) Matt Firman - 11:49 | | Third period | No scoring |
| ( 29 saves / 31 shots ) Eric Mihalik | | Goalie stats | Eric Hartzell ( 32 saves / 36 shots ) |

| March 10 | Colgate | 2 - 4 | Quinnipiac | Starr Arena | Recap |
| (unassisted) Chris Wagner - PS - 11:31 | | First period | 04:15 - Kellen Jones (Peca, Baron); 06:18 - Connor Jones (Peca, Baron) |
| (Price) Kurtis Bartliff - 13:04 | | Second period | 19:53 - GW PP - Jeremy Langlois (Jones, Peca) |
| No scoring | | Third period | 18:32 - PP - Scott Zurevinski (Hartzell) |
| ( 29 saves / 33 shots ) Eric Mihalik | | Goalie stats | Eric Hartzell ( 19 saves / 21 shots ) |

| March 11 | Colgate | 4 - 0 | Quinnipiac | Starr Arena | Recap |
| (Wilson, McPherson) Chris Wagner - GW - 04:37 | | First period | No scoring |
| (Bartliff, Bourdon) John Lidgett - 08:55 (Wagner, Sinz) Austin Smith - 17:08 | | Second period | No scoring |
| (Smith) Chris Wagner - EN - 15:48 | | Third period | No scoring |
| ( 31 saves / 31 shots ) Eric Mihalik | | Goalie stats | Eric Hartzell ( 27 saves / 30 shots ) |

| Colgate Wins Series 2-1 |

=== Semifinals ===
==== (1) Union vs. (4) Colgate ====
| March 16 | Union | 6 - 2 | Colgate | Boardwalk Hall | Recap |
| (Jooris) Daniel Carr - 01:35 (unassisted) Max Novak - 13:11 | | First period | No scoring |
| (Bodie, Welsh) Josh Jooris - GW PP - 13:57 | | Second period | 00:26 - Joe Wilson (Wagner, Smith) |
| (Welsh) Daniel Carr - SH - 03:39 (Jooris) Jeremy Welsh - 07:19 (Jooris, Hatch) Shawn Stuart - 18:19 | | Third period | 13:20 - Matt Firman (unassisted) |
| ( 28 saves / 30 shots ) Troy Grosenick | | Goalie stats | Eric Mihalik ( 24 saves / 19 shots ) / Alex Evin ( 8 saves / 9 shots ) |

==== (2) Cornell vs. (3) Harvard ====
| March 16 | Cornell | 1 - 6 | Harvard | Boardwalk Hall | Recap |
| No scoring | | First period | 04:38 - Patrick McNally (Grimshaw, Kroshus); 07:11 - GW - Alex Killorn (Blackwell, Biega) |
| No scoring | | Second period | 04:37 - Colin Moore (Valek, O'Regan); 09:09 - PP - Marshall Everson (Blackwell, McNally) |
| (Collins, McCarron) Joel Lowry - 18:54 | | Third period | 15:00 - Alex Killorn (Blackwell); 16:28 - Marshall Everson (Blackwell, Killorn) |
| ( 24 saves / 30 shots ) Andy Iles | | Goalie stats | Raphael Girard ( 18 saves / 19 shots ) |

=== 3rd Place Game ===
==== (3) Cornell vs. (4) Colgate ====
| March 17 | Cornell | 3 - 0 | Colgate | Boardwalk Hall | Recap |
| (Jillson, Lowry) Sean Collins - GW - 19:35 | | First period | No scoring |
| (Miller, Ryan) Dustin Mowrey - PP - 13:34 (unassisted) John McCarron - 17:48 | | Second period | No scoring |
| No scoring | | Third period | No scoring |
| ( 25 saves / 25 shots ) Andy Iles | | Goalie stats | Alex Evin ( 25 saves / 28 shots ) |

=== Championship ===
==== (1) Union vs. (3) Harvard ====
| March 17 | Union | 3 - 1 | Harvard | Boardwalk Hall | Recap |
| No scoring | | First period | No scoring |
| No scoring | | Second period | No scoring |
| (Sullivan, Forgaard) Jeremy Welsh - 05:29 (Gotisbehere, Jooris) Daniel Carr - GW - 09:34 (Carr) Josh Jooris - EN - 19:38 | | Third period | 04:52 - Alex Killorn (Fallstrom, Everson) |
| ( 16 saves / 17 shots ) Troy Grosenick | | Goalie stats | Raphael Girard ( 31 saves / 34 shots ) |

== Tournament awards ==
=== All-Tournament Team ===
- F Daniel Carr (Union)
- F Alex Killorn (Harvard)
- F Jeremy Welsh* (Union)
- D Danny Biega (Harvard)
- D Shayne Gostisbehere (Union)
- G Troy Grosenick (Union)

* Most Outstanding Player(s)
