= Troy Grosenick =

American ice hockey player (born 1989)

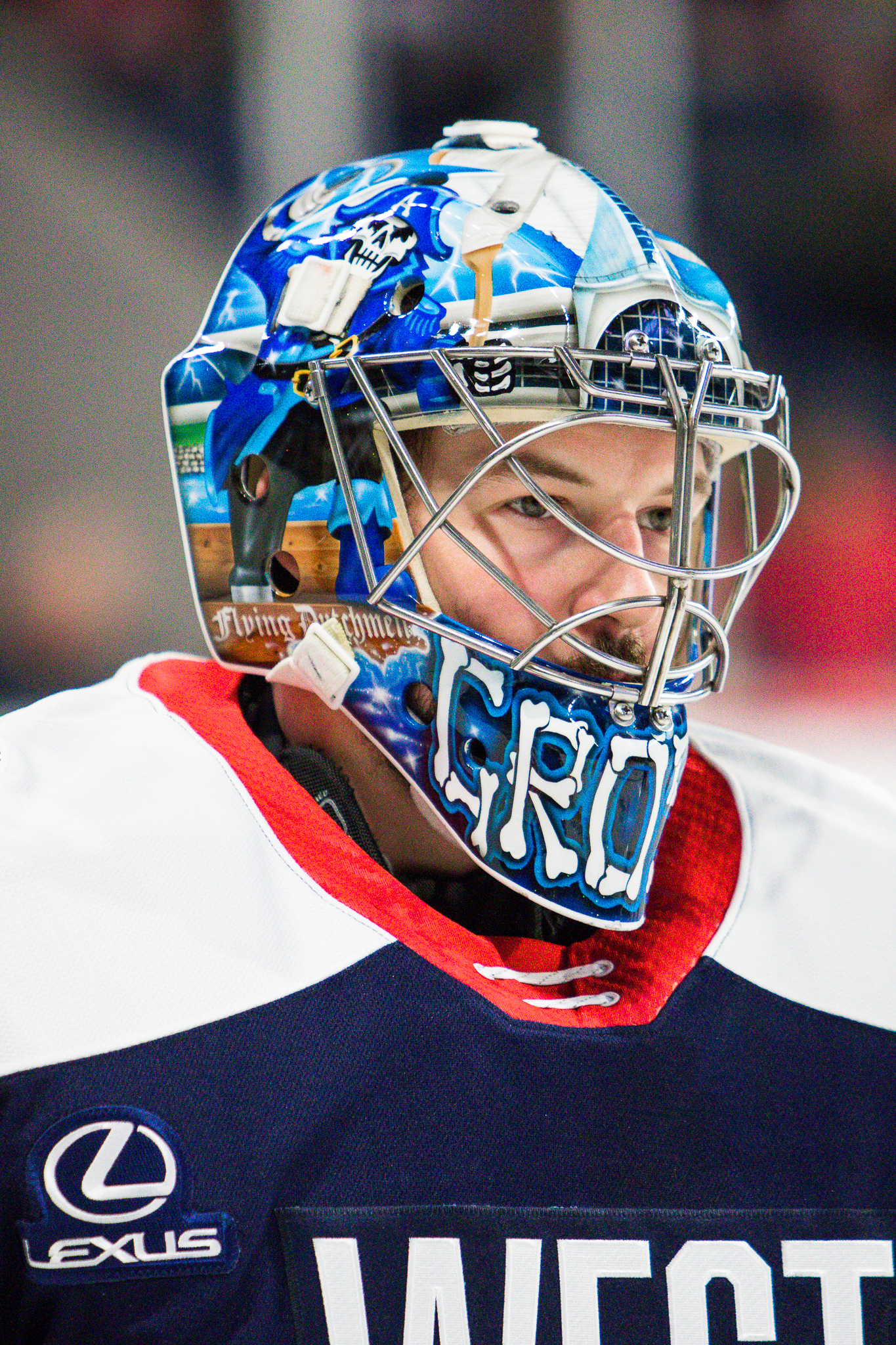
- Grosenick at the 2019 AHL All-Star Game
- Born: August 27, 1989 (age 37) Brookfield, Wisconsin, U.S.
- Height: 6 ft 1 in (185 cm)
- Weight: 190 lb (86 kg; 13 st 8 lb)
- Position: Goaltender
- Catches: Left
- NHL team Former teams: Free agent San Jose Sharks; Los Angeles Kings
- NHL draft: Undrafted
- Playing career: 2013–present

Troy Grosenick (/ˈɡroʊsnɪk/ GROHSS-nik; born August 27, 1989) is an American professional ice hockey goaltender who is currently an unrestricted free agent. He was most recently under contract with the Minnesota Wild of the National Hockey League (NHL).

== Playing career ==
Grosenick was born and raised in the Milwaukee/Waukesha suburb of Brookfield, Wisconsin, where he attended Brookfield East High School and graduated in 2007. He then went on to play with Team Illinois' Midget Major team for a year, and eventually ended up playing for the Cedar Rapids RoughRiders for two years before heading off to play for Union College in New York.

Grosenick played for the Union Dutchmen in the NCAA Men's Division I ECAC Hockey conference. In his sophomore year (2011–2012), Grosenick's outstanding play was recognized when he won the Ken Dryden Award as the ECAC Goaltender of the Year, and was selected to the 2011–12 ECAC First Team All-League. He was also named a First-Team AHCA All-American and was a Hobey Baker Award Finalist.

On April 8, 2013, following his third year at Union, Grosenick signed a one-year entry-level contract with the San Jose Sharks.

On November 12, 2014, Grosenick was called up after goalie Alex Stalock was placed on injured reserve. He made his NHL debut on November 16, 2014 against the Carolina Hurricanes where he went on to record a 45-save 2–0 shutout, becoming the 22nd goalie to record a shutout in their debut, and at the same time setting a record for most saves in a shutout debut in the modern era.

Grosenick was recalled once more on January 3, 2016 when Alex Stalock was sent down to the Sharks' AHL affiliate, the San Jose Barracuda, on a conditioning assignment.

He was re-signed by San Jose on June 5, 2017.

On February 25, 2018, Grosenick along with Brandon Bollig were traded to the Nashville Predators in exchange for a sixth round draft pick in 2018.

Grosenick started the 2018–19 season with the Milwaukee Admirals before being recalled by the Predators on October 22. He was reassigned to Milwaukee on October 31. On March 1, 2019, after posting a 14–12–3 record, Grosenick signed a one-year, two-way contract with the Predators.

On October 9, 2020, Grosenick was signed as a free agent to a one-year, two-way contract with the Los Angeles Kings. After attending the Kings training camp, Grosenick initially made the Kings roster, serving as the backup in their opening 2020–21 season game before he was placed on waivers. He was subsequently claimed the following day by the Edmonton Oilers on January 16, 2021. Added by the Oilers as insurance with an injury to veteran Mike Smith, Grosenick remained on the Oilers roster without making an appearances until he was subsequently re-claimed by the Kings off waivers on February 6, 2021. He was immediately assigned to AHL affiliate, the Ontario Reign. On March 10, 2021, Grosenick was called back up to the Kings to make his first NHL start since the 2014–15 season, against the Anaheim Ducks. He made 33 saves for the Kings and earned his second career victory in a 5–1 victory.

As a free agent following his lone season with the Kings, Grosenick was signed to a one-year, two-way contract with the Boston Bruins on July 28, 2021.

After a standout season within the Bruins organization, Grosenick left as a free agent and was signed to a one-year, $750,000 contract with the Philadelphia Flyers on July 13, 2022. In the following 2022–23 season, Grosenick was assigned to AHL affiliate, the Lehigh Valley Phantoms and was limited to just 6 games through injury.

On July 1, 2023, having concluded his contract with the Flyers, Grosenick was signed to a one-year, two-way contract in a return to former club, the Nashville Predators, for the 2023–24 season.

At the conclusion of his contract within the Predators organization, Grosenick left as a free agent and was signed to a one-year, two-way contract with the Minnesota Wild on July 1, 2024. On October 1, 2024 it was announced that he would miss the entirety of the 2024–25 season due to injury.

== Career statistics ==
			Regular season									Playoffs
Season	Team	League	GP	W	L	T/OT	MIN	GA	SO	GAA	SV%	GP	W	L	MIN	GA	SO	GAA	SV%
2008–09	Cedar Rapids RoughRiders	USHL	24	13	5	4	1363	53	1	2.33	.910	1	0	0	39	0	2	3.09	.778
2009–10	Cedar Rapids RoughRiders	USHL	44	26	14	2	2509	110	4	2.63	.902	4	2	1	192	6	1	1.88	.949
2010–11	Union College	ECAC	3	0	0	1	84	3	0	2.12	.897	—	—	—	—	—	—	—	—
2011–12	Union College	ECAC	34	22	6	3	1922	53	5	1.65	.936	—	—	—	—	—	—	—	—
2012–13	Union College	ECAC	34	17	10	5	1928	68	2	2.12	.926	—	—	—	—	—	—	—	—
2013–14	Worcester Sharks	AHL	35	18	14	0	1966	86	2	2.62	.903	—	—	—	—	—	—	—	—
2014–15	Worcester Sharks	AHL	36	20	13	3	2167	95	1	2.63	.906	2	1	0	88	5	0	3.41	.886
2014–15	San Jose Sharks	NHL	2	1	1	0	118	3	1	1.53	.948	—	—	—	—	—	—	—	—
2015–16	San Jose Barracuda	AHL	28	11	10	4	1574	83	0	3.16	.894	1	0	0	4	0	0	0.00	1.000
2016–17	San Jose Barracuda	AHL	49	30	10	7	2729	93	10	2.04	.926	15	8	7	914	41	2	2.69	.910
2017–18	San Jose Barracuda	AHL	20	6	9	2	1126	56	0	2.98	.902	—	—	—	—	—	—	—	—
2017–18	Milwaukee Admirals	AHL	7	3	4	0	414	19	0	2.75	.911	—	—	—	—	—	—	—	—
2018–19	Milwaukee Admirals	AHL	46	24	14	6	2634	106	1	2.41	.919	5	2	3	282	17	0	3.62	.874
2019–20	Milwaukee Admirals	AHL	33	20	9	3	1910	73	2	2.29	.920	—	—	—	—	—	—	—	—
2020–21	Ontario Reign	AHL	4	1	2	1	244	17	0	4.18	.856	—	—	—	—	—	—	—	—
2020–21	Los Angeles Kings	NHL	2	1	1	0	120	6	0	3.00	.922	—	—	—	—	—	—	—	—
2021–22	Providence Bruins	AHL	30	16	6	4	1651	55	3	2.00	.933	2	0	2	143	4	0	1.68	.939
2022–23	Lehigh Valley Phantoms	AHL	6	3	2	0	325	18	0	3.32	.892	—	—	—	—	—	—	—	—
2023–24	Milwaukee Admirals	AHL	30	17	8	2	1735	74	2	2.56	.907	11	5	5	586	26	1	2.66	.902
NHL totals			4	2	2	0	239	9	1	2.27	.933	—	—	—	—	—	—	—	—

== Awards and honors ==
Award	Year
College
Ken Dryden Award - ECAC Goaltender of the Year	2012
All-ECAC Hockey First Team	2012
AHCA East First-Team All-American	2012
ECAC Hockey All-Tournament Team	2012, 2013
AHL
All-Star Game	2017
First All-Star Team	2017
Aldege "Baz" Bastien Memorial Award	2017
Harry "Hap" Holmes Memorial Award	2020
Yanick Dupre Memorial Award	2020
Second All-Star Team	2022

Awards and achievements
Preceded by Keith Kinkaid	Ken Dryden Award; 2011–12	Succeeded by Eric Hartzell
Preceded by Jeremy Welsh	ECAC Hockey Most Outstanding Player in Tournament; 2013	Succeeded by Daniel Carr
Preceded by Peter Budaj	Aldege "Baz" Bastien Memorial Award; 2016–17	Succeeded by Garret Sparks
