= Alex Biega (ice hockey) =

Canadian ice hockey player (born 1988)

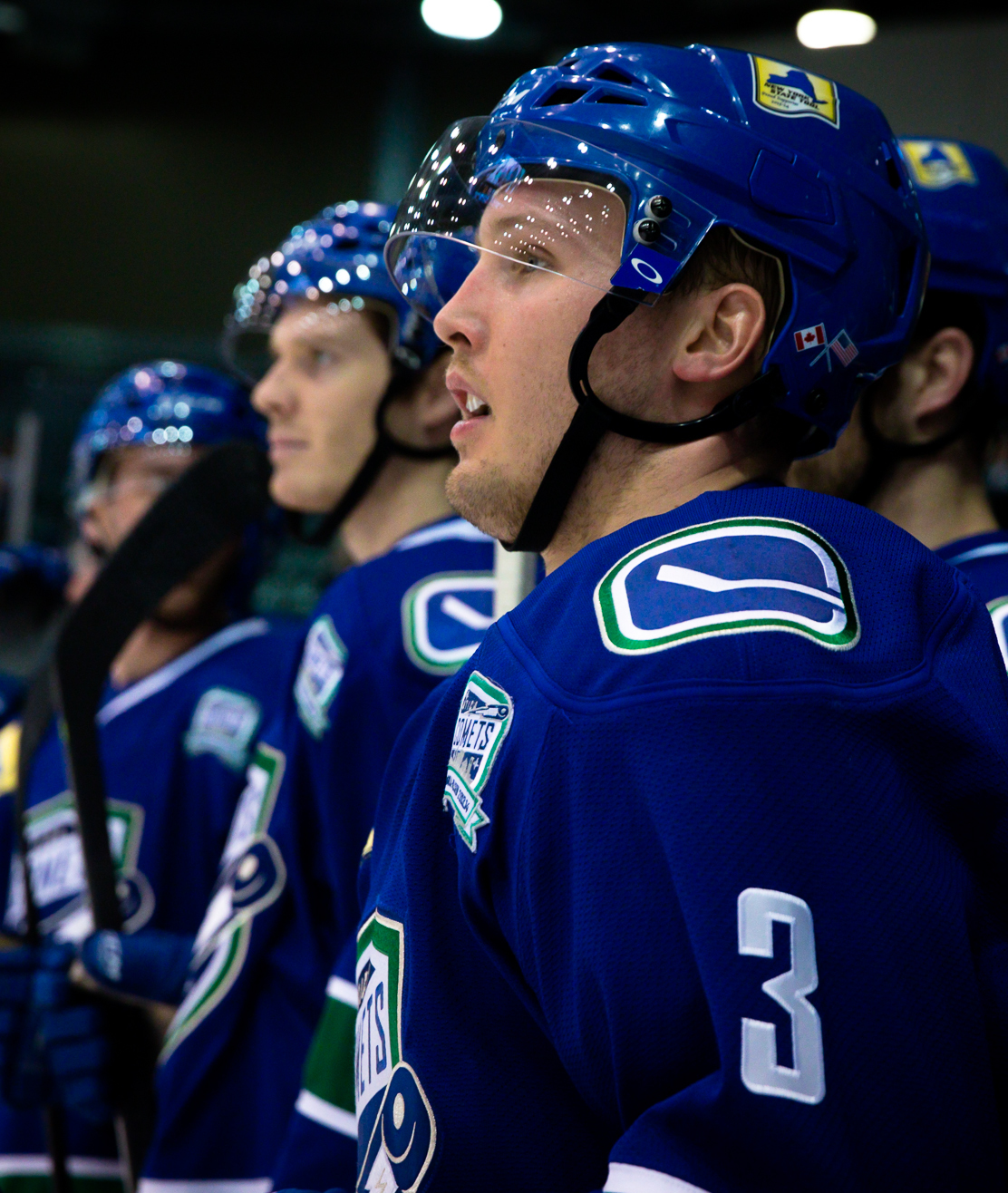
- Biega with the Utica Comets in 2014
- Born: April 4, 1988 (age 38) Montreal, Quebec, Canada
- Height: 5 ft 11 in (180 cm)
- Weight: 194 lb (88 kg; 13 st 12 lb)
- Position: Defence
- Shot: Right
- Played for: Vancouver Canucks; Detroit Red Wings; Toronto Maple Leafs
- NHL draft: 147th overall, 2006; Buffalo Sabres
- Playing career: 2010–2022

Alex Biega (born April 4, 1988) is a Canadian former professional ice hockey defenceman. Biega was selected by the Buffalo Sabres in the 5th round (147th overall) of the 2006 NHL entry draft and played the majority of his career with the Vancouver Canucks.

== Playing career ==
As a youth, Biega played in the 2001 and 2002 Quebec International Pee-Wee Hockey Tournaments with a minor ice hockey team from West Island, Montreal.

=== Amateur ===
Biega was drafted by the Rimouski Océanic in the first round (11th overall) of the 2004 QMJHL Entry Draft, but choose instead to play high school hockey at Salisbury School in Salisbury, Connecticut. Biega then attended Harvard University, where he played four seasons of NCAA Division I ice hockey with the Harvard Crimson men's ice hockey team. Biega was a standout player for the Crimson where, in his freshman season, he was named to the ECAC Hockey All-Rookie team, and in his junior year he was awarded the John Tudor Memorial Cup as the Crimson's most valuable player. In his senior year, Biega was named the team's captain.

=== Professional ===
Biega was selected by the Buffalo Sabres in the 2006 NHL entry draft. Upon graduation from university, on May 27, 2010, Biega was signed by the Sabres to a two-year contract. He attended his first Sabres training camp, but was cut and sent to the team's American Hockey League (AHL) affiliate, the Portland Pirates. On October 9, 2010, Biega made his professional debut playing with the Pirates, and on November 20, 2010, scored his first professional goal to help his team to a 2–1 win over the visiting Worcester Sharks. He went on to play in 61 regular-season games with the Pirates during the 2010–11 AHL season and also played 12 playoff games during his rookie campaign. Biega spent the entire 2011–12 season with the Rochester Americans, the new AHL affiliate of the Buffalo Sabres. He registered 5 goals and 25 points in 72 games and played in 3 playoff games with no points.

On July 5, 2013, Biega agreed to a one-year contract as a free agent with the Vancouver Canucks. He was assigned to AHL affiliate, the Utica Comets for their inaugural season in 2013–14, appearing in a career-high 73 games for 22 points from the blueline. On July 1, 2014, Biega re-signed with the Canucks, on a one-year contract worth $600,000. He was called up to Vancouver after posting 10 points in 25 games with Utica. Biega made his NHL debut with the Canucks on February 16, 2015, scoring his first NHL goal in a 3–2 win over the Minnesota Wild. Biega's goal would be the game winner. He finished the season with 7 games played for the Canucks, scoring the one goal. With the Comets, he finished with 3 goals and 19 points in 69 regular season games and four points in 16 playoff games en route to the Calder Cup final.

Biega started the 2015–16 season with the Comets where he was named captain. He was called up to the Canucks in mid-December and on December 20, 2015, Biega earned his first career assist. It came on a Jannik Hansen goal in a 5−4 shootout loss to the Florida Panthers. On February 2, 2016, Biega signed a one-way, two-year contract extension valued at $1.5 million. At the start of the 2016–17 NHL season, Biega made the Canucks out of training camp, but only appeared in one game as a forward before being sent down to the Comets for a conditioning stint in November. In 2017–18, Biega played 31 games with the Canucks, registering 6 assists. On February 28, 2018, Biega was again signed to a two-year, $1.65 million contract extension by the Canucks. Biega made the Canucks out of camp again at the start of the 2018–19 NHL season, but was sent down to Utica on October 18 not having played a game. He was recalled on October 25 and scored his first goal of the season and second overall for the Canucks in an overtime loss to the Chicago Blackhawks on February 7, 2019. He finished the season appearing in 41 games, scoring two goals and registering 16 points.

On September 30, 2019, Biega was placed on waivers by the Canucks, prior to the start of the 2019–20 NHL season. He cleared waivers the next day. On October 6, 2019, Biega was traded by the Canucks to the Detroit Red Wings in exchange for David Pope. He made his debut for the Red Wings on October 15, in a game against his former team, the Vancouver Canucks. He finished the season with 3 points in 48 games with the Red Wings. On March 9, 2020, Biega signed a one-year contract extension with the Red Wings. During the pandemic-shortened 2020–21 season, Biega was placed on waivers for the purpose of transferring him to the Red Wings' taxi squad. He finished the season with 3 points in 13 games with the Red Wings.

On July 28, 2021, having left the Red Wings as a free agent, Biega was signed to a one-year, two-way contract with the Toronto Maple Leafs. Biega saw little action with the Maple Leafs, playing in only two games. He made his debut for the Maple Leafs on January 1, 2022, against the Ottawa Senators. He played in 31 games with the Maple Leafs AHL affiliate, the Toronto Marlies. On March 21, 2022, Biega was traded to the Nashville Predators for future considerations. He was assigned to the Predators' AHL affiliate, the Milwaukee Admirals.

On December 19, 2022, Biega announced his retirement from professional hockey.

== Personal life ==
Biega's brother, Danny Biega, was also a professional ice hockey player who last played for the Carolina Hurricanes. He also has two other brothers, Marc and Michael. Alex, Danny, and Michael all played hockey for Harvard University, becoming the first trio of brothers since 2000 to play for Harvard.

Biega met his wife Diana while in Boston. They had a son together in April 2015. While with the Vancouver Canucks, Biega became involved with the National Hockey League Players' Association's Core Development Program, which helps former NHL players transition from their hockey careers post retirement, helping to develop the program.

== Career statistics ==
=== Regular season and playoffs ===
			Regular season					Playoffs
Season	Team	League	GP	G	A	Pts	PIM	GP	G	A	Pts	PIM
2003–04	West Island Lions	QMAAA	37	7	17	24	58	9	0	9	9	15
2004–05	Salisbury School	USHS	27	9	22	31	45	—	—	—	—	—
2005–06	Salisbury School	USHS	28	10	17	27	51	—	—	—	—	—
2006–07	Harvard University	ECAC	33	6	12	18	36	—	—	—	—	—
2007–08	Harvard University	ECAC	34	3	19	22	28	—	—	—	—	—
2008–09	Harvard University	ECAC	31	4	16	20	50	—	—	—	—	—
2009–10	Harvard University	ECAC	33	2	8	10	30	—	—	—	—	—
2010–11	Portland Pirates	AHL	61	3	15	18	52	12	1	1	2	6
2011–12	Rochester Americans	AHL	65	5	18	23	47	2	0	2	2	6
2012–13	Rochester Americans	AHL	72	5	20	25	59	3	0	2	2	2
2013–14	Utica Comets	AHL	73	3	19	22	53	—	—	—	—	—
2014–15	Utica Comets	AHL	62	3	16	19	24	23	0	4	4	16
2014–15	Vancouver Canucks	NHL	7	1	0	1	0	—	—	—	—	—
2015–16	Utica Comets	AHL	14	1	5	6	8	—	—	—	—	—
2015–16	Vancouver Canucks	NHL	51	0	7	7	22	—	—	—	—	—
2016–17	Vancouver Canucks	NHL	36	0	3	3	18	—	—	—	—	—
2016–17	Utica Comets	AHL	1	0	0	0	2	—	—	—	—	—
2017–18	Vancouver Canucks	NHL	44	1	8	9	32	—	—	—	—	—
2018–19	Utica Comets	AHL	3	0	2	2	0	—	—	—	—	—
2018–19	Vancouver Canucks	NHL	41	2	14	16	22	—	—	—	—	—
2019–20	Detroit Red Wings	NHL	49	0	3	3	24	—	—	—	—	—
2020–21	Detroit Red Wings	NHL	13	0	3	3	4	—	—	—	—	—
2021–22	Toronto Marlies	AHL	31	1	6	7	28	—	—	—	—	—
2021–22	Toronto Maple Leafs	NHL	2	0	0	0	0	—	—	—	—	—
2021–22	Milwaukee Admirals	AHL	15	3	4	7	14	2	0	0	0	0
AHL totals			397	24	105	129	287	42	1	9	10	30
NHL totals			243	4	38	42	122	—	—	—	—	—

=== International ===
Year	Team	Event	Result	GP	G	A	Pts	PIM
2005	Canada Quebec	U17	9th	5	0	0	0	4
Junior totals				5	0	0	0	4

== Awards and honours ==
Award	Year
College
All-ECAC Hockey Rookie Team	2006–07
All-ECAC Hockey Third Team	2007–08
ECAC Hockey All-Tournament Team	2008
All-ECAC Hockey Third Team	2008–09
All-Ivy League First All-Star Team	2008–09
ECAC Hockey All-Academic Team	2008–09
