= Jeremy Welsh =

Canadian ice hockey player (born 1988)

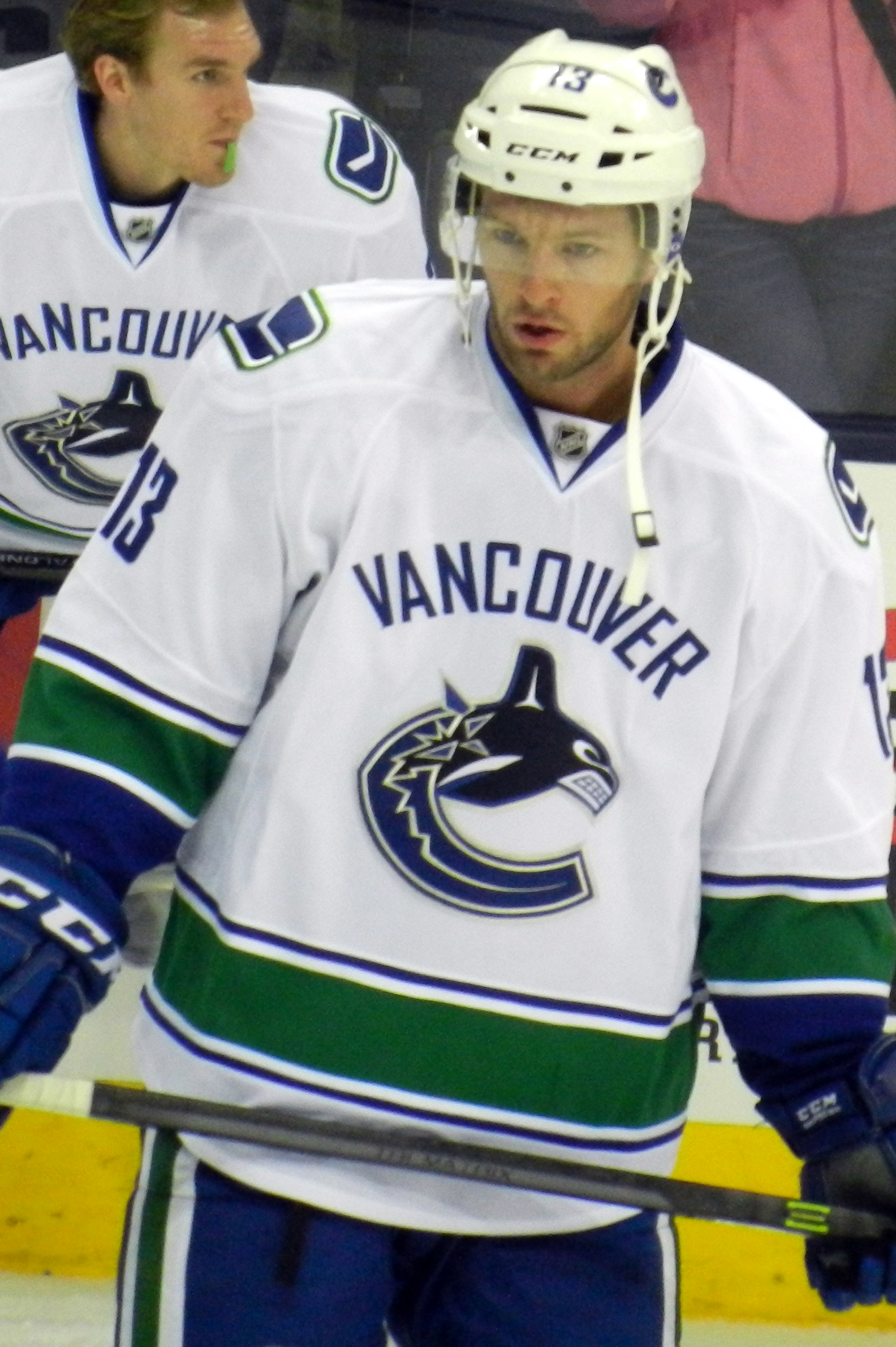
- Welsh with the Vancouver Canucks in 2013
- Born: April 30, 1988 (age 38) Bayfield, Ontario, Canada
- Height: 6 ft 3 in (191 cm)
- Weight: 210 lb (95 kg; 15 st 0 lb)
- Position: Centre
- Shoots: Left
- Erste Liga team Former teams: Corona Brașov; Carolina Hurricanes; Vancouver Canucks; St. Louis Blues; Fischtown Pinguins; Düsseldorfer EG; HC Dynamo Pardubice; Grizzlys Wolfsburg; Krefeld Pinguine; Cracovia; Nottingham Panthers
- NHL draft: Undrafted
- Playing career: 2012–present

Jeremy Welsh (born April 30, 1988) is a Canadian professional ice hockey centre currently playing under contract with Romanian Erste Liga Corona Brașov. Welsh was most recently with UK EIHL side Nottingham Panthers, Cracovia of the Polska Hokej Liga (PHL) and formerly played in the National Hockey League (NHL) with the Carolina Hurricanes, Vancouver Canucks and St. Louis Blues.

== Playing career ==
Welsh signed a one-year entry-level contract with the Carolina Hurricanes on April 5, 2012 and played in his first NHL game two days later against the Florida Panthers. Prior to the start of the 2013–14 season Welsh was traded, along with Zac Dalpe, to the Vancouver Canucks in exchange for Kellan Tochkin and a fourth round selection in the 2014 NHL Draft.

Welsh scored his first NHL goal with the Canucks on November 22, 2013, against Sergei Bobrovsky of the Columbus Blue Jackets.

On July 21, 2014, Welsh signed a one-year, two-way deal as a free agent with the St. Louis Blues.

After two seasons within the Blues organization, Welsh left to sign his first contract abroad, agreeing to a one-year deal with new German DEL entrant, the Fischtown Pinguins on September 1, 2016. In his debut season in Germany in 2016–17, Welsh enjoyed a productive season in compiling 13 goals and 29 points in 36 games.

At the conclusion of his contract, Welsh opted to continue in the DEL, in agreeing to a one-year deal as a free agent with Düsseldorfer EG on May 17, 2017.

As a free agent to begin the 2018–19 season, Welsh agreed to a try-out contract with Czech outfit, HC Dynamo Pardubice of the Czech Extraliga on November 23, 2018. Welsh made 4 appearances for Pardubice, collecting 1 assist, before ending his trial with the club and returning to the DEL in securing a one-year deal for the remainder of the season with Grizzlys Wolfsburg on December 10, 2018. Welsh contributed to Wolfsburg offensively with 18 points in 26 games before leaving as a free agent at the conclusion of the season on March 8, 2019.

On May 5, 2019, Welsh opted to continue in the DEL, signing a one-year contract with his fourth top flight club, Krefeld Pinguine.

After spending the 2020–21 season in the Polska Hokej Liga with KS Cracovia, Welsh agreed to join the UK Elite Ice Hockey League side Nottingham Panthers for the 2021–22 season.

After two years with Nottingham, Welsh joined Romanian Erste Liga side HSC Csíkszereda in October 2023.

== Career statistics ==
			Regular season					Playoffs
Season	Team	League	GP	G	A	Pts	PIM	GP	G	A	Pts	PIM
2007–08	Oakville Blades	OJHL	48	17	35	52	26	—	—	—	—	—
2008–09	Oakville Blades	OJHL	49	36	47	83	38	—	—	—	—	—
2009–10	Union Dutchmen	ECAC	39	10	9	19	45	—	—	—	—	—
2010–11	Union Dutchmen	ECAC	40	16	21	37	34	—	—	—	—	—
2011–12	Union Dutchmen	ECAC	40	27	17	44	47	—	—	—	—	—
2011–12	Carolina Hurricanes	NHL	1	0	0	0	4	—	—	—	—	—
2012–13	Charlotte Checkers	AHL	69	14	12	26	16	5	0	3	3	2
2012–13	Carolina Hurricanes	NHL	5	0	1	1	0	—	—	—	—	—
2013–14	Utica Comets	AHL	49	7	8	15	14	—	—	—	—	—
2013–14	Vancouver Canucks	NHL	19	1	0	1	6	—	—	—	—	—
2014–15	Chicago Wolves	AHL	75	20	21	41	32	5	1	1	2	2
2015–16	Chicago Wolves	AHL	74	15	13	28	54	—	—	—	—	—
2015–16	St. Louis Blues	NHL	2	0	0	0	2	—	—	—	—	—
2016–17	Fischtown Pinguins	DEL	36	13	16	29	33	6	3	1	4	25
2017–18	Düsseldorfer EG	DEL	49	10	10	20	8	—	—	—	—	—
2018–19	HC Dynamo Pardubice	ELH	4	0	1	1	2	—	—	—	—	—
2018–19	Grizzlys Wolfsburg	DEL	26	7	11	18	8	—	—	—	—	—
2019–20	Krefeld Pinguine	DEL	45	7	8	15	12	—	—	—	—	—
2020–21	Cracovia	Polska Hokej Liga	12	2	3	5	6	17	4	8	12	2
2021–22	Nottingham Panthers	EIHL	53	17	40	57	8	2	1	1	2	0
2022–23	Nottingham Panthers	EIHL	49	9	23	32	12	4	0	0	0	0
NHL totals			27	1	1	2	12	—	—	—	—	—

== Awards and honors ==
Award	Year
College
All-ECAC Hockey Third Team	2010–11
All-ECAC Hockey Second Team	2011–12
AHCA East Second-Team All-American	2011–12
ECAC Hockey All-Tournament Team	2012

Awards and achievements
Preceded by Ryan Rondeau	ECAC Hockey Most Outstanding Player in Tournament; 2012	Succeeded by Troy Grosenick
