= Alex Killorn =

Canadian ice hockey player (born 1989)

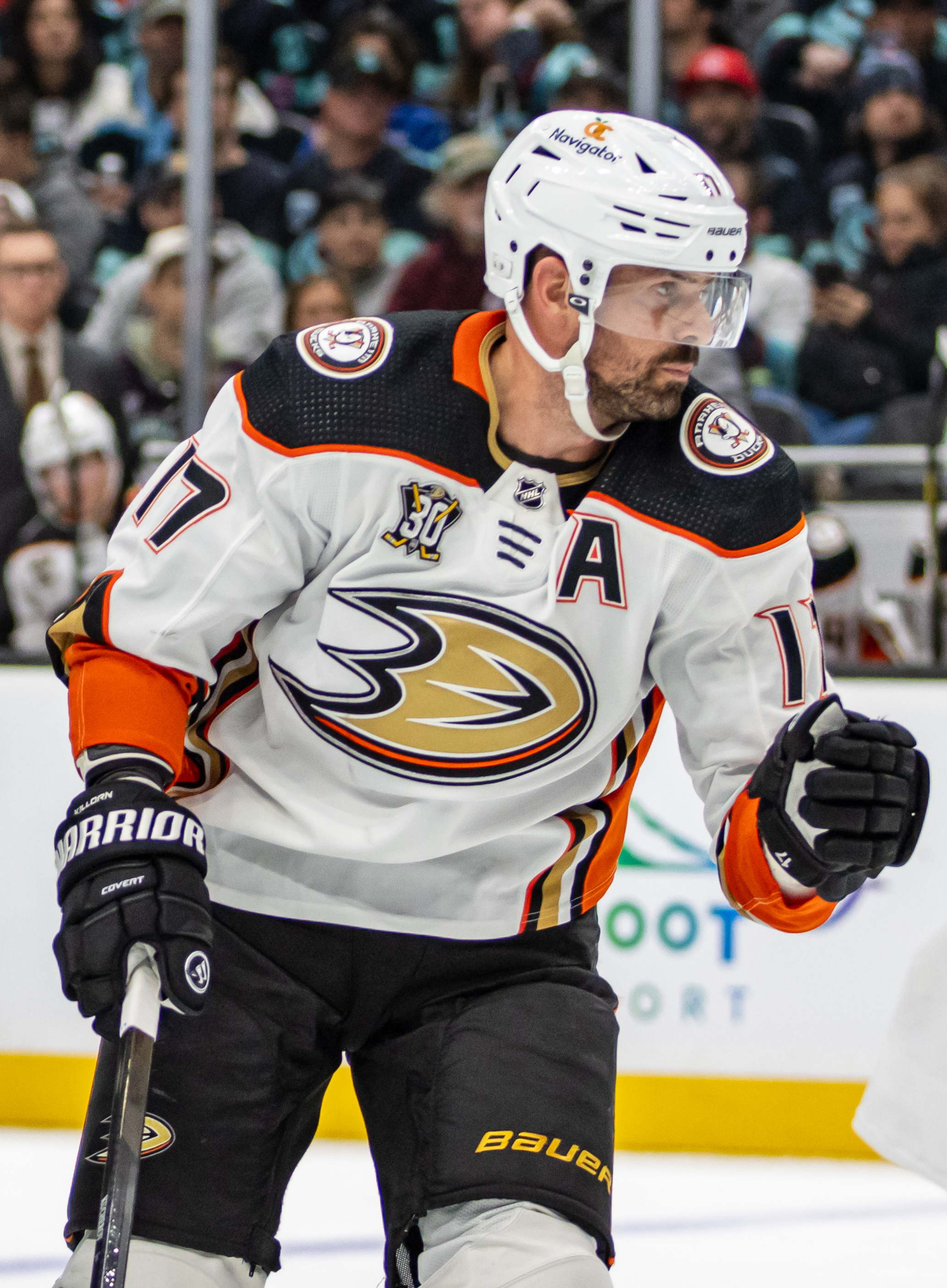
- Killorn with the Anaheim Ducks in March 2024
- Born: September 14, 1989 (age 37) Halifax, Nova Scotia, Canada
- Height: 6 ft 1 in (185 cm)
- Weight: 194 lb (88 kg; 13 st 12 lb)
- Position: Forward
- Shoots: Left
- NHL team Former teams: Anaheim Ducks; Tampa Bay Lightning
- National team: Canada
- NHL draft: 77th overall, 2007; Tampa Bay Lightning
- Playing career: 2012–present

Alexander Joseph Killorn (born September 14, 1989) is a Canadian professional ice hockey player who is a forward and alternate captain for the Anaheim Ducks of the National Hockey League (NHL). He was selected by the Tampa Bay Lightning in the third round, 77th overall, of the 2007 NHL entry draft. Killorn won back-to-back Stanley Cup titles with the Lightning in 2020 and 2021.

== Early life ==
Although born in Halifax, Nova Scotia, he grew up in Beaconsfield, Quebec, with two sisters. He attended Loyola High School in Montreal and played Lakeshore minor hockey. He played midget AAA hockey for the Lac St. Louis Lions before attending Deerfield Academy in Deerfield, Massachusetts for two seasons.

== Playing career ==
=== Collegiate ===
Killorn was selected by the Tampa Bay Lightning of the National Hockey League (NHL) in the third round, 77th overall, of the 2007 NHL entry draft before his senior year at Deerfield. He then played collegiate hockey in the United States with Harvard University in the NCAA Men's Division I ECAC Hockey conference. In his senior year, Killorn's outstanding play was recognized when he was selected to the 2011–12 ECAC Hockey First Team.

=== Professional (2012–present) ===
==== Tampa Bay Lightning (2012–2023) ====
After finishing his senior season with Harvard, Killorn was assigned to the Norfolk Admirals of the American Hockey League (AHL) at the end of the 2011–12 campaign. Killorn turned out to be a key player for the Admirals as they went on to win the Calder Cup.

On May 19, 2012, Killorn signed a two-year, entry-level contract with the Tampa Bay Lightning. During the 2012 NHL lockout, Killorn played for the Lightning's American Hockey League top affiliate, the Syracuse Crunch then came up to the NHL for the Lightning after the lockout ended in January 2013. On February 10, 2013, he recorded his first career NHL assist and point on a goal scored by captain Vincent Lecavalier, against the New York Rangers. On February 16, Killorn scored his first goal on José Théodore in a 6–5 overtime win against the inner-state rival Florida Panthers. Killorn finished his rookie year, the 48-game lockout-shortened 2012–13 season with seven goals and 12 assists for 19 points in 38 games, while the Lightning as a team finished second-to-last in the Eastern Conference and third-to-last in the league altogether.

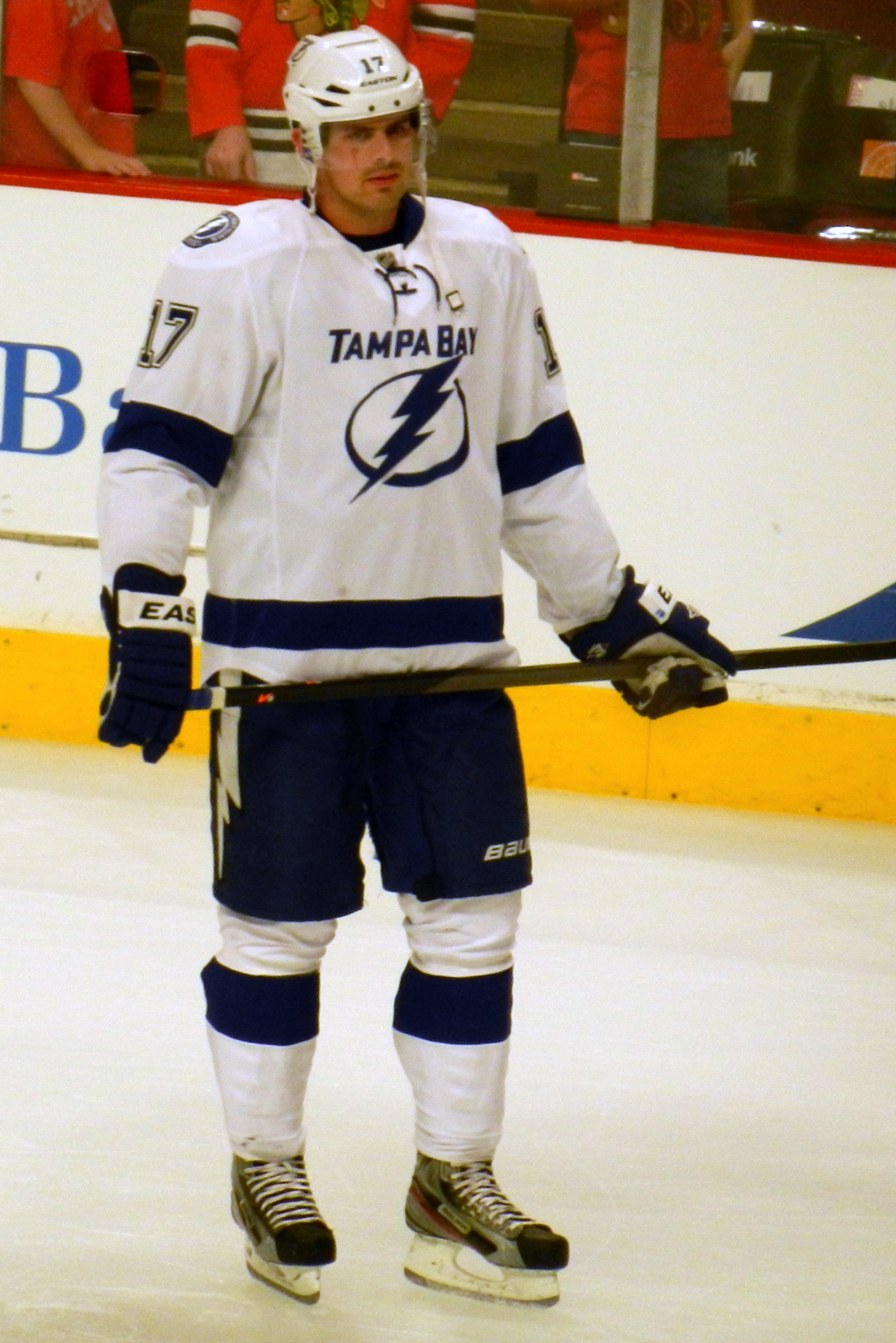
Killorn with the Tampa Bay Lightning in October 2013

Killorn had a breakout season during the 2013–14 season, his second in the NHL, finishing the season with 17 goals, 24 assists, and 41 points recorded in all 82 games played, helping the Lightning qualify for the playoffs for the first time since 2011 as the team finished third in the East. Killorn made his Stanley Cup playoff debut on April 16, 2014, in the first game in the opening round of the 2014 playoffs, which ended in a 5–4 loss against the Montreal Canadiens, recording a goal on Carey Price and an assist on a goal scored by captain Steven Stamkos. The Lightning would eventually get swept in four games by the sixth-seeded Canadiens and Killorn finished his first playoff year and series with a goal and an assist for two points in all four contests played.

On June 19, 2014, the Lightning announced that they had re-signed Killorn to a two-year $5.1 million contract extension for $2.55 million annually. Killorn played 71 games in the 2014–15 season, recording 15 goals, 23 assists, and 38 points. During the 2015 playoffs, Killorn had a successful post season run with the Lightning, as the team would defeat the Detroit Red Wings in seven games in the opening round (erasing a 3–2 series deficit in doing so) before defeating the Montreal Canadiens in six games in the second round and the Presidents' Trophy-winning New York Rangers in seven games in the third round to reach the Stanley Cup Final, where the Lightning ended up falling to the Chicago Blackhawks in six games. During the run, Killorn posted several records for former players from Harvard. In the Finals, Killorn's game one goal on Corey Crawford on June 3, 2015, was the first goal scored by a Harvard alum in a Stanley Cup Finals game. Killorn added a second goal in game four of the series on Crawford a week later on June 10 to become the first Harvard alum with multiple goals and/or assists in a Stanley Cup Finals series. His 2015 postseason scoring totaled (nine goals and assists for 18 points in all 26 games played), which are all single-postseason records among the twelve Harvard alumni who have played in the Stanley Cup playoffs. Killorn's ten goals over two postseasons are second only to Dominic Moore (11 goals) on the Harvard all-time list, which was achieved in only 30 playoff games (in the opening round in 2014 and all four rounds in 2015 combined) to Moore's 88.

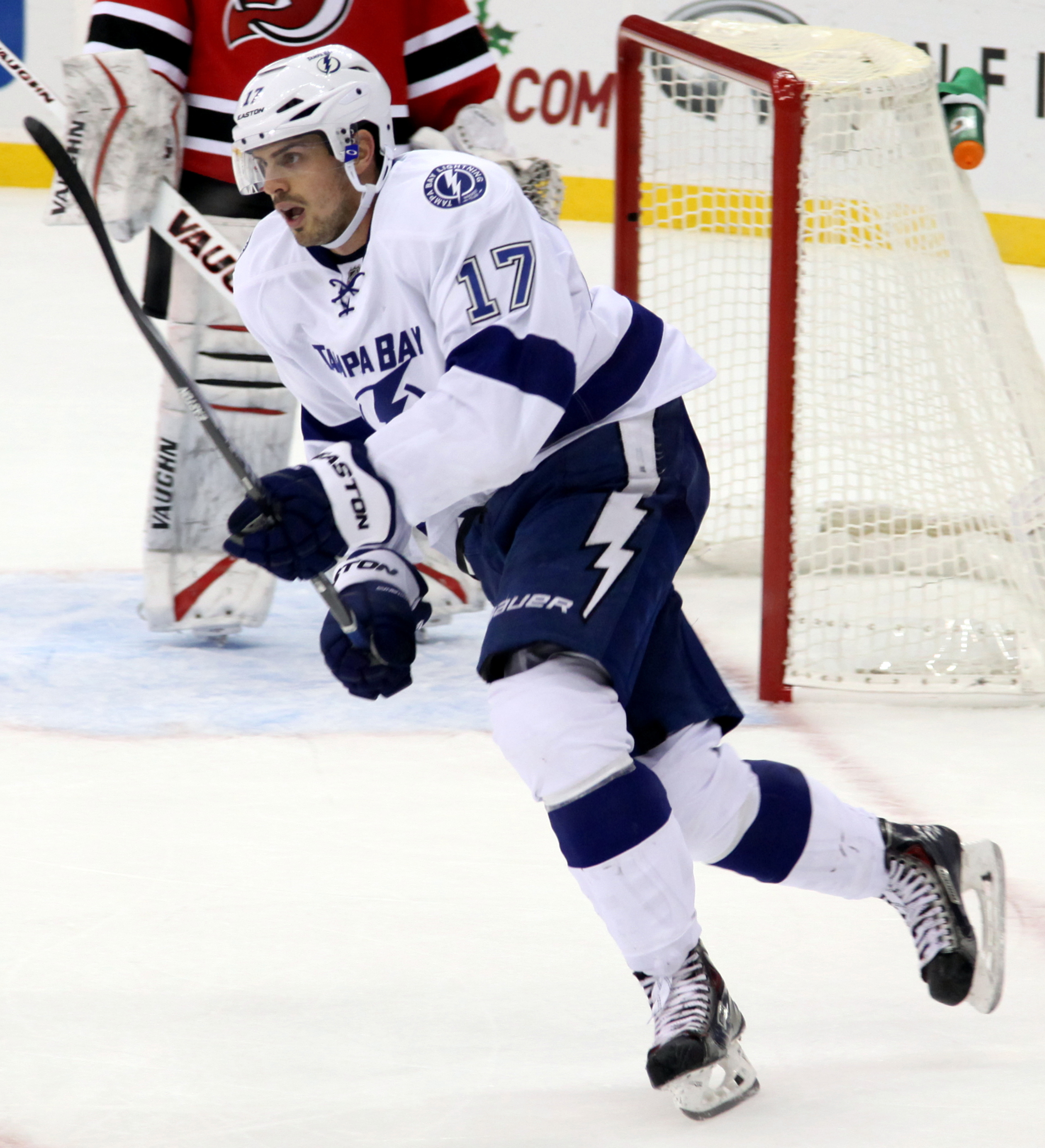
Killorn in game action with the Lightning in December 2014

In the 2015–16 season, Killorn appeared in 81 games with the team, recording 14 goals and 26 assists for 40 points. In the 2016 playoffs, Killorn and the Lightning would go on another deep playoff run as they defeated the Detroit Red Wings in the first round for the second consecutive time, this time in five games before defeating the New York Islanders in five games in the second round and falling to the eventual Stanley Cup champion Pittsburgh Penguins in the third round in seven games, one win short from a second consecutive appearance in the Stanley Cup Finals and erasing a 3–2 series lead in the process. Killorn skated in all 17 Stanley Cup playoff games, scoring five goals, and eight assists for 13 points.

On July 17, 2016, Killorn signed a seven-year, $31 million extension with the Lightning. On March 23, 2017, Killorn recorded his 100th career assist on a goal scored by Jonathan Drouin in a 6–3 win against the Boston Bruins. Killorn finished the 2016–17 season with 81 games played and 19 goals, 17 assists, and 36 points recorded as the Lightning as a team finished one point out of a playoff spot, missing the playoffs for the first time since 2013.

On November 3, 2017, the NHL Department of Player Safety fined Killorn $5,000 for an incident that occurred during a game against the New York Rangers the previous night. Killorn completed the 2017–18 campaign playing in all 82 games and recording 15 goals, 32 assists, and 47 points as the Lightning as a team finished as the top seed in the East to return to the playoffs. In the 2018 playoffs (after narrowly missing the playoffs the previous season), Killorn and the Lightning went on another lengthy run as they defeated the New Jersey Devils in five games in the first round along with the Boston Bruins in five games in the second round before losing in seven games in the third round to the eventual Stanley Cup champion Washington Capitals, one win short from reaching the Stanley Cup Finals once more and surrendering a 3–2 series lead in doing so. Killorn ended the run with five goals and two assists for seven points in all 17 games.

On February 19, 2019, Killorn recorded his 100th career NHL goal against Carter Hart in a 5-2 Lightning victory over the Philadelphia Flyers. On February 28, Killorn played his 500th NHL game in a 4–1 loss to the Boston Bruins. Killorn recorded his first career NHL hat-trick against the Washington Capitals on March 16. Killorn ended the 2018–19 season playing in all 82 contests once more and putting up 18 goals and 22 assists for 40 points as the Lightning clinched the Presidents' Trophy for the first time in franchise history as the regular season champions. In the opening round of the 2019 playoffs, however, Killorn would be limited to one goal and no assists for one point in all four games as the Lightning would be on the receiving end of a four-game sweep by the Columbus Blue Jackets. After the Lightning's abrupt early playoff exit, it was revealed that Killorn played game four through a medial collateral ligament tear.

Killorn was named alternate captain for the Lightning prior to the 2019–20 season after Ryan Callahan went into an early retirement due to a degenerative back disease caused by multiple back injuries in a short time span. The last three weeks of the season would get canceled due to the COVID-19 pandemic and the playoffs would get postponed until the summer, resulting in Killorn finishing the season playing in 68 games with 26 goals, 23 assists and 49 points recorded. The 26 goals was a career high for Killorn as he was on pace for scoring 30+ goals for the first time in his career at the time the NHL announced the last 12 games would be canceled. On September 10, 2020, Killorn was suspended one game by the NHL Department of Player Safety for boarding New York Islanders' forward Brock Nelson during the Eastern Conference final playoff game against the Islanders the previous day. Killorn and the Lightning would eventually defeat the Islanders in the third round in six games then the Dallas Stars in six games in the 2020 Stanley Cup Final to clinch the Stanley Cup. He ended the 2020 playoffs with five goals and assists for 10 points in 24 games. Killorn was nominated for the Bill Masterton Memorial Trophy by the Lightning following the season but did not win it or was named a top three finalist by the NHL.

Killorn finished the 2020–21 pandemic-shortened season playing in all 56 games with 15 goals, 18 assists and 33 points recorded. After defeating the inner-state rival Florida Panthers in six games, the Carolina Hurricanes in six games and the New York Islanders in the first three rounds of the 2021 playoffs, Killorn sustained a broken fibula on June 28, 2021, in game one of the 2021 Stanley Cup Final when blocking a shot from Montreal Canadiens defenseman Jeff Petry; he did not play the rest of the series although he tried to do so after returning to practice just days after the injury occurred. In his absence, the Lightning went on to defeat the Canadiens in five games to win the Stanley Cup for the second consecutive season. He would end the playoffs with eight goals and nine assists for 17 points while playing in 19 games.

On October 28, 2021, Killorn recorded his 200th NHL assist on a goal scored by Andrej Sustr in a 5–1 win over the Arizona Coyotes. Killorn kept up his durability in the 2021–22 season by playing all 82 games again and putting up 25 goals, 34 assists and 59 points. In the 2022 playoffs, Killorn and the Lightning would defeat the Toronto Maple Leafs in seven games in the first round (erasing a 3–2 series deficit in doing so), the inner-state rival and Presidents' Trophy-winning Florida Panthers in a four-game sweep in the second round and the New York Rangers in six games in the third round to clinch a third consecutive appearance Stanley Cup Finals (fourth in Killorn's Lightning tenure) and would go on to lose in six games to the Colorado Avalanche. He was held goalless in the playoffs for the first time in his career and recorded four assists for four points in all 23 games played. Following the season, Killorn was again nominated for the Bill Masterton Memorial Trophy but wasn’t a top three finalist by the NHL.

Killorn finished the 2022–23 season playing in all 82 games again and putting up career highs in goals (27), assists (37) and points (64). As the Lightning opened the 2023 playoffs matched up against the Toronto Maple Leafs in the opening round for the second consecutive season, Killorn followed up with three goals and two assists for five points in all six games as the Lightning would this time lose to the Maple Leafs in six games.

==== Anaheim Ducks (2023–present) ====
On July 1, 2023, after 11 seasons with the Lightning, Killorn signed a four-year contract with the Anaheim Ducks. After missing the first ten games of the 2023–24 season due to a broken finger in a preseason game against the San Jose Sharks, Killorn made his season and Ducks debut on November 5, in a 4–2 Ducks win over the Vegas Golden Knights. Killorn scored his first goal for Anaheim in a 5–2 loss to the Los Angeles Kings on November 24. On December 2, Killorn recorded his 200th NHL goal on goaltender Ivan Prosvetov in a 4–3 win over the Colorado Avalanche. Killorn ended the 2023–24 season playing in 63 games with 18 goals, 18 assists and 36 points recorded.

== International play ==
Medal record

Representing Canada

Men's ice hockey

World Championships
Silver medal – second place	2017 Germany/France	

On April 19, 2017, Killorn was named to the Canada senior team for the 2017 World Championship. On May 21, he earned a silver medal with Canada's team when they lost to the Sweden senior team 2–1 in the final.

== Career statistics ==
=== Regular season and playoffs ===
			Regular season					Playoffs
Season	Team	League	GP	G	A	Pts	PIM	GP	G	A	Pts	PIM
2005–06	Lac Saint-Louis Lions	QMAAA	43	18	34	52	94	10	9	6	15	8
2006–07	Deerfield Academy	USHS	25	18	14	32	22	—	—	—	—	—
2007–08	Deerfield Academy	USHS	24	28	27	55	18	—	—	—	—	—
2008–09	Harvard University	ECAC	30	6	8	14	48	—	—	—	—	—
2009–10	Harvard University	ECAC	32	9	11	20	26	—	—	—	—	—
2010–11	Harvard University	ECAC	34	15	14	29	36	—	—	—	—	—
2011–12	Harvard University	ECAC	34	23	23	46	47	—	—	—	—	—
2011–12	Norfolk Admirals	AHL	10	2	4	6	2	17	3	9	12	8
2012–13	Syracuse Crunch	AHL	44	16	22	38	32	—	—	—	—	—
2012–13	Tampa Bay Lightning	NHL	38	7	12	19	14	—	—	—	—	—
2013–14	Tampa Bay Lightning	NHL	82	17	24	41	63	4	1	1	2	4
2014–15	Tampa Bay Lightning	NHL	71	15	23	38	36	26	9	9	18	12
2015–16	Tampa Bay Lightning	NHL	81	14	26	40	44	17	5	8	13	42
2016–17	Tampa Bay Lightning	NHL	81	19	17	36	66	—	—	—	—	—
2017–18	Tampa Bay Lightning	NHL	82	15	32	47	45	17	5	2	7	12
2018–19	Tampa Bay Lightning	NHL	82	18	22	40	45	4	1	0	1	6
2019–20	Tampa Bay Lightning	NHL	68	26	23	49	20	24	5	5	10	27
2020–21	Tampa Bay Lightning	NHL	56	15	18	33	37	19	8	9	17	6
2021–22	Tampa Bay Lightning	NHL	82	25	34	59	66	23	0	4	4	12
2022–23	Tampa Bay Lightning	NHL	82	27	37	64	45	6	3	2	5	0
2023–24	Anaheim Ducks	NHL	63	18	18	36	54	—	—	—	—	—
2024–25	Anaheim Ducks	NHL	82	19	18	37	30	—	—	—	—	—
2025–26	Anaheim Ducks	NHL	82	15	18	33	40	12	4	5	9	8
NHL totals			1,032	250	322	572	605	152	41	45	86	129

=== International ===
Year	Team	Event	Result	GP	G	A	Pts	PIM
2006	Canada Quebec	U17	1st place, gold medalist(s)	6	1	1	2	8
2017	Canada	WC	2nd place, silver medalist(s)	10	0	0	0	8
Junior totals				6	1	1	2	8
Senior totals				10	0	0	0	8

== Awards and honours ==
Award	Year	Ref
College
All-ECAC Hockey First Team	2012	
AHCA East First-Team All-American	2012	
All-Ivy League First-Team	2012	
ECAC Hockey All-Tournament Team	2012	
AHL
Calder Cup champion	2012	
NHL
Stanley Cup champion	2020, 2021	
