= Danny Biega =

Canadian ice hockey player (born 1991)

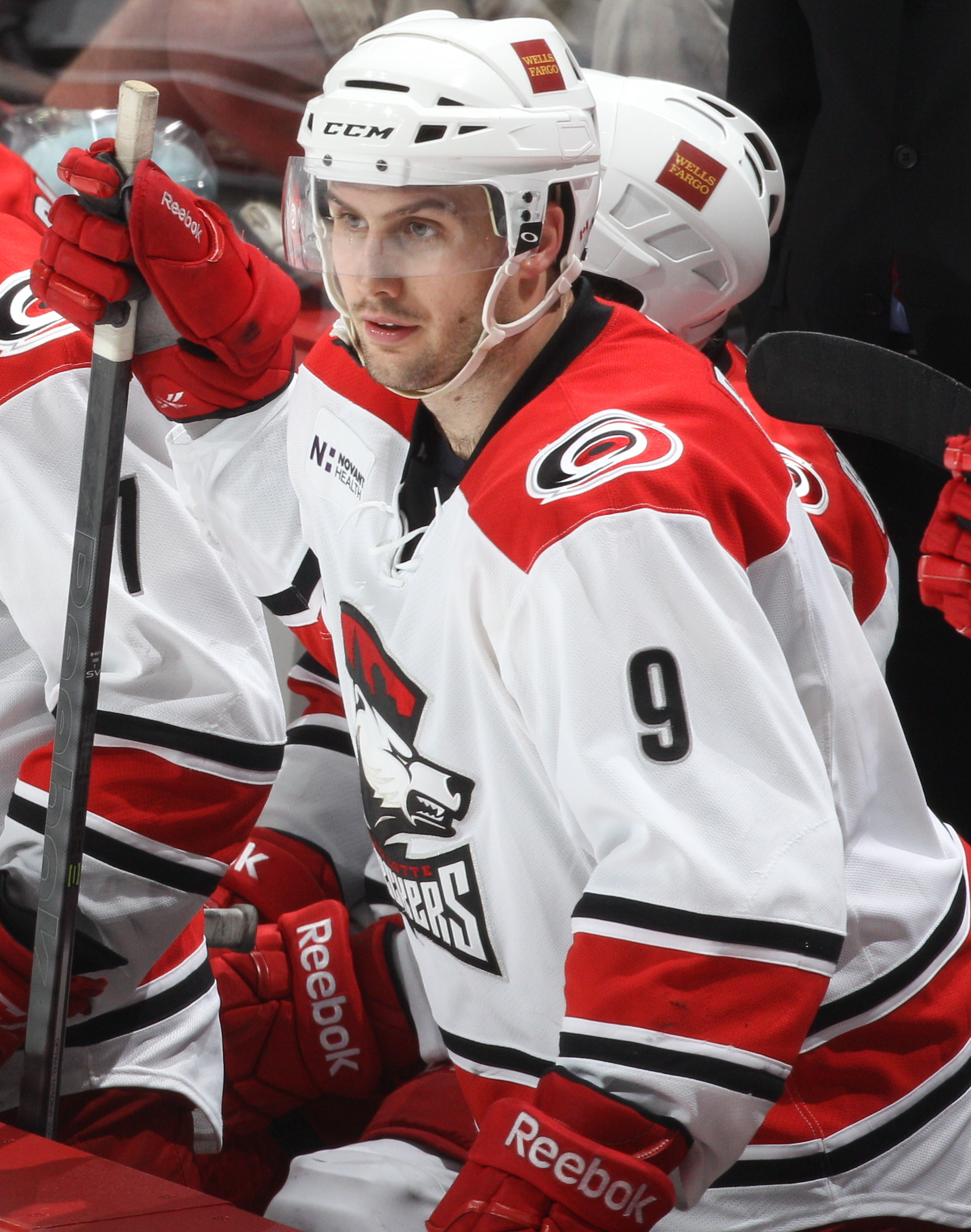
- Biega with the Carolina Hurricanes in 2013
- Born: September 29, 1991 (age 35) Montreal, Quebec, Canada
- Height: 6 ft 1 in (185 cm)
- Weight: 210 lb (95 kg; 15 st 0 lb)
- Position: Defence
- Shot: Right
- Played for: Carolina Hurricanes
- NHL draft: 67th overall, 2010; Carolina Hurricanes
- Playing career: 2010–2016

Danny Biega (born September 29, 1991) is a Canadian former professional ice hockey defenceman. He played for the Carolina Hurricanes of the National Hockey League (NHL). He was selected by the Hurricanes in the third round (67th overall) of the 2010 NHL entry draft. His brother, Alex Biega, has played 250 games in the NHL. He is under contract to the Toronto Maple Leafs.

== Playing career ==
As a youth, Biega played in the 2004 Quebec International Pee-Wee Hockey Tournament with a minor ice hockey team from West Island, Montreal.

Biega attended the Salisbury School in Salisbury, CT, and played hockey there for 2 years. In 2009, his senior year, Biega captained the hockey team to the New England prep school championship.

Biega played his collegiate hockey for the Harvard Crimson in the ECAC Hockey conference. In his junior year, Biega's outstanding play was recognized when he was named the ECAC's best defensive defenceman and selected to the 2011–12 ECAC Hockey First Team. During his senior year at Harvard, Biega signed a three-year contract with the Carolina Hurricanes of the National Hockey League (NHL) and was assigned to their American Hockey League affiliate, the Charlotte Checkers.

During the 2014–15 season, Biega played for the Hurricanes of the National Hockey League. Biega made his NHL debut with the Hurricanes on March 19, 2015, in his hometown of Montreal.

== Personal life ==
Biega is the younger brother of Alex Biega, a former professional ice hockey player who last played for the Toronto Maple Leafs in 2021-22. Biega also has two other brothers, Marc and Michael. Alex, Danny, and Michael all played hockey for Harvard University, becoming the first trio of brothers since 2000 to play for Harvard.

== Career statistics ==
| | | | Regular season | | | | | Playoffs |
| Season | Team | League | GP | G | A | Pts | PIM | GP | G | A | Pts | PIM |
|---|---|---|---|---|---|---|---|---|---|---|---|---|
| 2007–08 | Salisbury School | USHS | 26 | 4 | 13 | 17 | 20 | — | — | — | — | — |
| 2008–09 | Salisbury School | USHS | 29 | 8 | 14 | 22 | 28 | — | — | — | — | — |
| 2009–10 | Harvard University | ECAC | 32 | 5 | 4 | 9 | 47 | — | — | — | — | — |
| 2010–11 | Harvard University | ECAC | 34 | 11 | 19 | 30 | 34 | — | — | — | — | — |
| 2011–12 | Harvard University | ECAC | 34 | 10 | 25 | 35 | 41 | — | — | — | — | — |
| 2012–13 | Harvard University | ECAC | 32 | 2 | 9 | 11 | 43 | — | — | — | — | — |
| 2012–13 | Charlotte Checkers | AHL | 1 | 0 | 0 | 0 | 0 | 3 | 0 | 2 | 2 | 8 |
| 2013–14 | Charlotte Checkers | AHL | 65 | 3 | 15 | 18 | 22 | — | — | — | — | — |
| 2014–15 | Charlotte Checkers | AHL | 69 | 2 | 12 | 14 | 89 | — | — | — | — | — |
| 2014–15 | Carolina Hurricanes | NHL | 10 | 0 | 2 | 2 | 0 | — | — | — | — | — |
| 2015–16 | Charlotte Checkers | AHL | 27 | 3 | 5 | 8 | 40 | — | — | — | — | — |
| NHL totals | | | 10 | 0 | 2 | 2 | 0 | — | — | — | — | — |

== Awards and honours ==
| Award | Year |
|---|---|
| All-ECAC Hockey Second Team | 2010–11 |
| ECAC Best Defensive Defenceman | 2011–12 |
| All-ECAC Hockey First Team | 2011–12 |
| AHCA East First-Team All-American | 2011–12 |
| ECAC Hockey All-Tournament Team | 2012 |

Awards and achievements
| Preceded by Brock Matheson | ECAC Hockey Best Defensive Defenseman; 2011–12 | Succeeded by Zach Davies |
