= Antoine Laganière =

Canadian ice hockey player

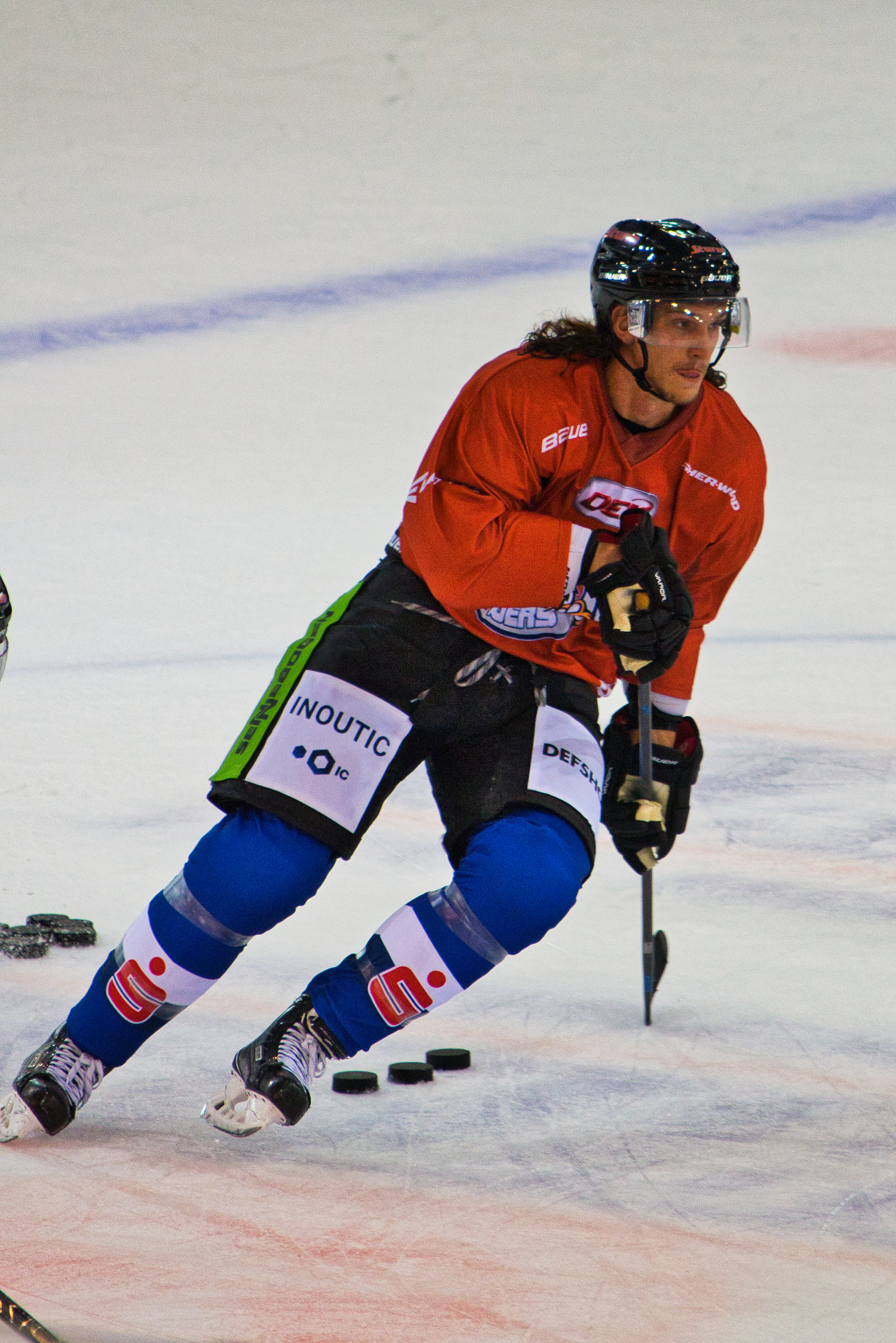
- Born: July 5, 1990 (age 36) L'Île-Cadieux, Quebec, Canada
- Height: 6 ft 4 in (193 cm)
- Weight: 196 lb (89 kg; 14 st 0 lb)
- Position: Forward
- Shoots: Left
- team Former teams: Free Agent; Norfolk Admirals; San Diego Gulls; Ässät; Straubing Tigers
- NHL draft: Undrafted
- Playing career: 2013–present

Antoine Charles Laganière (born July 5, 1990) is a Canadian professional ice hockey forward who is currently an unrestricted free agent who most recently played for the Straubing Tigers of the Deutsche Eishockey Liga (DEL).

== Playing career ==
Undrafted, Laganière played collegiate hockey with the Yale Bulldogs in the ECAC. In his senior season with the Bulldogs in 2012–13, Laganière was a focal part of the offense, placing third amongst Yale in contributing with 15 goals and 29 points in 37 games, to help the Bulldogs advance to the Frozen Four and capture the college's first NCAA Division 1 Championship title.

On April 17, 2013, as a coveted free agent, Laganière agreed to a one-year, entry-level contract with the Anaheim Ducks of the National Hockey League. In his first professional season after attending the Ducks 2013 training camp he was assigned to American Hockey League primary affiliate, the Norfolk Admirals for the duration of the 2013–14 campaign. He established himself as a regular for Norfolk appearing in 72 games for 10 goals and 18 points. On July 18, 2014, he agreed to a one-year, two-way extension to remain with the Ducks.

In his second season assigned to the Norfolk Admirals in 2014–15, Laganière increased his offensive output with 14 goals and 21 points in 73 games. As a restricted free agent from the Ducks, Laganière was not signed to another NHL contract by the Ducks, however remained in the organization by agreeing to an AHL contract with inaugural affiliate, the San Diego Gulls on July 8, 2015.

After concluding his first season with San Diego in 2015–16 and having again increased his contribution within the team, Laganière agreed to return for his fourth season within the Ducks organization in signing a one-year extension with the Gulls on September 8, 2016. During the 2016–17 season, Laganière made his 200th appearance in the AHL, and established a career high of 21 goals and 16 assists for 37 points in 64 games.

As a free agent in the off-season, Laganière ended his association with the Ducks in opting to pursue a career abroad by signing a one-year contract with Finnish club, Ässät Pori of the Liiga on August 28, 2017. In the 2017–18 season, Laganière made a quick transition to the Finnish game, leading the club with 17 goals and placing second with 35 points in 57 games. Having progressed through the wild-card round, he was unable to help Ässät progress past the qualifying round in a 4-1 series defeat to Oulun Kärpät, contributing with 4 points in 7 games.

Laganière left Finland after one season, opting to continue his European career in Germany, securing a one-year deal with the Straubing Tigers of the DEL on June 6, 2018.

== Career statistics ==
			Regular season					Playoffs
Season	Team	League	GP	G	A	Pts	PIM	GP	G	A	Pts	PIM
2005–06	Châteauguay Patriotes	QMAAA	44	14	12	26	8	19	11	10	21	14
2006–07	Châteauguay Patriotes	QMAAA	44	20	23	43	30	3	2	2	4	2
2007–08	Deerfield Academy	USHS	25	8	30	38	14	—	—	—	—	—
2008–09	Deerfield Academy	USHS	24	12	16	28	10	—	—	—	—	—
2009–10	Yale University	ECAC	25	7	3	10	18	—	—	—	—	—
2010–11	Yale University	ECAC	25	5	8	13	14	—	—	—	—	—
2011–12	Yale University	ECAC	35	19	14	33	45	—	—	—	—	—
2012–13	Yale University	ECAC	37	15	14	29	58	—	—	—	—	—
2013–14	Norfolk Admirals	AHL	72	10	8	18	36	4	0	0	0	2
2014–15	Norfolk Admirals	AHL	73	14	7	21	42	—	—	—	—	—
2015–16	San Diego Gulls	AHL	57	16	16	32	36	9	2	2	4	4
2016–17	San Diego Gulls	AHL	64	21	16	37	30	10	1	2	3	2
2017–18	Ässät	Liiga	57	17	18	35	73	7	1	3	4	12
2018–19	Straubing Tigers	DEL	52	13	20	33	30	2	1	1	2	0
2019–20	Straubing Tigers	DEL	42	13	18	31	26	—	—	—	—	—
2020–21	Straubing Tigers	DEL	37	9	17	26	20	3	2	1	3	0
AHL totals			266	61	47	108	144	23	3	4	7	8

== Awards and honours ==
Award	Year
College
All-Ivy League Second Team	2013
NCAA Champions (Yale)	2013
