= Eric Hartzell =

American ice hockey player

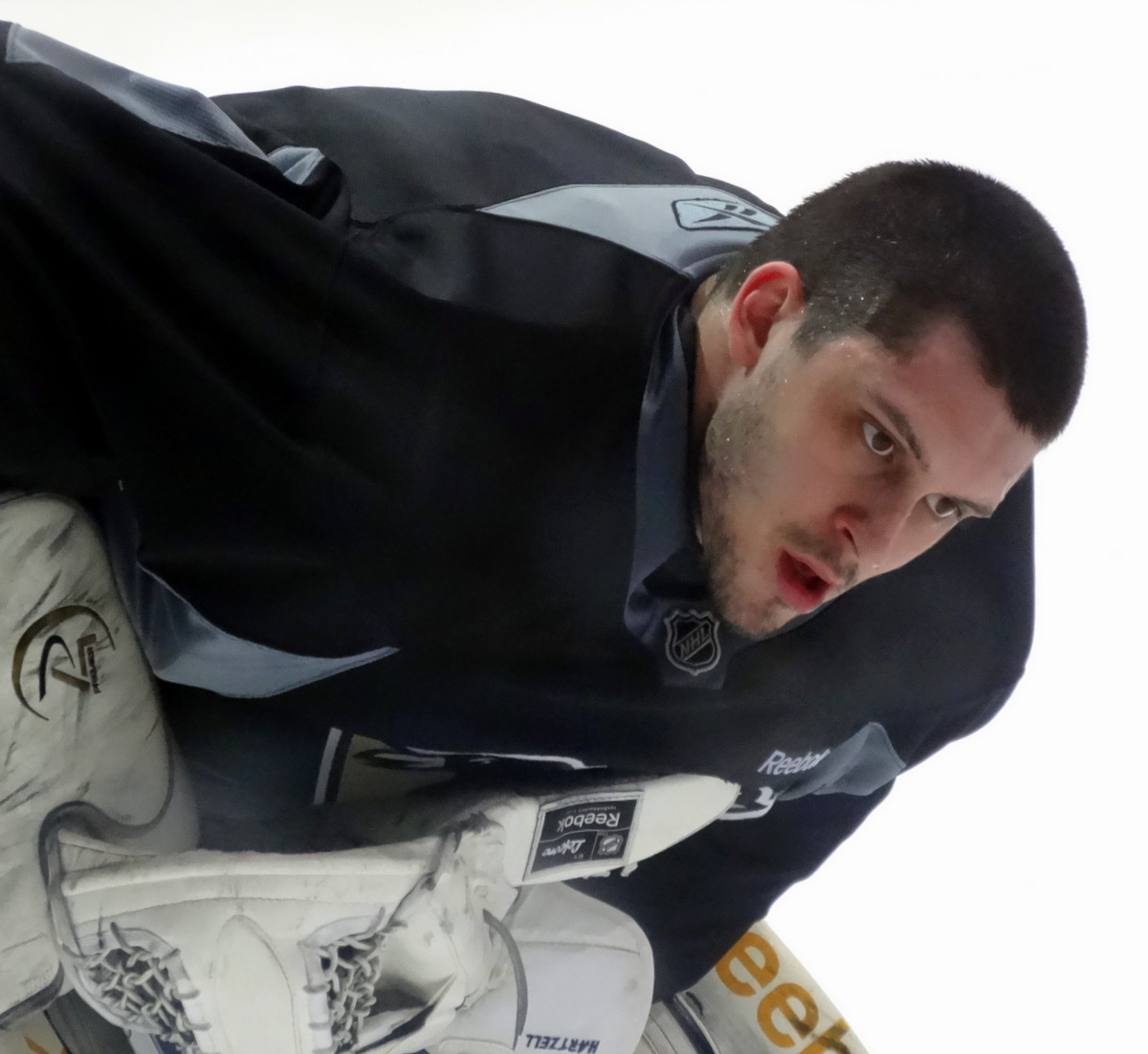
- Hartzell practicing with the Penguins in 2013.
- Born: May 28, 1989 (age 37) White Bear Lake, Minnesota, U.S.
- Height: 6 ft 4 in (193 cm)
- Weight: 205 lb (93 kg; 14 st 9 lb)
- Position: Goaltender
- Caught: Left
- Played for: WBS Penguins; Stockton Heat; Heilbronner Falken; HK Nitra
- NHL draft: Undrafted
- Playing career: 2013–2018

Eric Hartzell (born May 28, 1989) is an American former professional ice hockey goaltender. He last played abroad for HK Nitra in the Slovak Extraliga (Slovak).

== Playing career ==
Before turning professional, Hartzell attended Quinnipiac University, where he played four seasons of NCAA Men's Division I Ice Hockey with the Quinnipiac Bobcats men's ice hockey team. In his final year with the Bobcats, Hartzell was selected to the 2012–2013 NCAA (East) First All-American Team, was named NCAA Top Collegiate Player Hobey Baker Award Hat Trick Finalist, and was selected as the USCHO.com Player of the Year. On April 14, 2013, Hartzell was signed to a two-year entry-level contract with the Pittsburgh Penguins.

He made his professional debut in the 2013–14 season with Pittsburgh's American Hockey League affiliate, the Wilkes-Barre/Scranton Penguins.

After his contract with the Penguins, Hartzell was not tendered a new deal and was released to free agency. Unable to garner interest in the NHL or AHL, Hartzell was signed by the Idaho Steelheads of the ECHL on October 11, 2015. Hartzell appeared in 5 games with the Steelheads in the 2015–16 season, before he was loaned on a professional try-out contract to the Stockton Heat of the AHL on November 7, 2015. After featured in relief in a single games with the Heat, Hartzell opted to venture to Germany for the remainder of the season, linking up with Heilbronner Falken of the DEL2.

As a free agent after his tenure with Heilbronner, Hartzell opted to return to the ECHL, signing a one-year deal with the Fort Wayne Komets to share goaltending duties alongside Pat Nagle on August 8, 2016. In the 2016–17 season, Hartzell appeared in 19 games with the Komets for 7 wins. Relegated to a backup role, Hartzell opted to conclude his contract with Fort Wayne and return to Europe, signing a deal for the remainder of the year with the Slovak club HK Nitra of Slovak Extraliga on January 7, 2017.

== Career statistics ==
			Regular season									Playoffs
Season	Team	League	GP	W	L	T/OT	MIN	GA	SO	GAA	SV%	GP	W	L	MIN	GA	SO	GAA	SV%
2006–07	Sioux Falls Stampede	USHL	1	0	1	0	60	5	0	5.00	.865	—	—	—	—	—	—	—	—
2007–08	Sioux Falls Stampede	USHL	32	19	9	2	1835	84	5	2.75	.913	2	0	2	140	7	0	3.00	.920
2008–09	Sioux Falls Stampede	USHL	46	20	22	2	2599	142	1	3.28	.900	2	0	2	73	9	0	7.39	.736
2009–10	Quinnipiac University	ECAC	6	4	2	0	299	13	1	2.61	.894	—	—	—	—	—	—	—	—
2010–11	Quinnipiac University	ECAC	28	12	7	6	1570	58	3	2.22	.927	—	—	—	—	—	—	—	—
2011–12	Quinnipiac University	ECAC	30	12	11	6	1748	64	1	2.20	.913	—	—	—	—	—	—	—	—
2012–13	Quinnipiac University	ECAC	42	30	7	5	2522	66	5	1.57	.933	—	—	—	—	—	—	—	—
2013–14	Wilkes-Barre/Scranton Penguins	AHL	25	10	8	1	1233	51	3	2.48	.902	—	—	—	—	—	—	—	—
2013–14	Wheeling Nailers	ECHL	14	8	5	1	843	44	1	3.13	.900	—	—	—	—	—	—	—	—
2014–15	Wheeling Nailers	ECHL	32	17	14	1	1855	85	1	2.75	.914	5	2	2	255	10	0	2.36	.924
2014–15	Wilkes-Barre/Scranton Penguins	AHL	2	2	0	0	123	6	0	2.92	.882	—	—	—	—	—	—	—	—
2015–16	Idaho Steelheads	ECHL	5	2	3	0	274	17	0	3.73	.878	—	—	—	—	—	—	—	—
2015–16	Stockton Heat	AHL	1	0	0	0	38	0	0	0.00	1.000	—	—	—	—	—	—	—	—
2015–16	Heilbronner Falken	DEL2	22	7	14	0	1284	80	1	3.74	.911	—	—	—	—	—	—	—	—
2016–17	Fort Wayne Komets	ECHL	19	7	7	0	950	54	1	3.41	.888	—	—	—	—	—	—	—	—
2016–17	HK Nitra	Slovak	15	—	—	—	868	37	0	2.56	.918	13	—	—	750	27	0	2.16	.932
2017–18	HK Nitra	Slovak	11	5	6	0	539	29	1	3.23	.881	—	—	—	—	—	—	—	—
2017–18	Quad City Mallards	ECHL	16	3	8	0	777	59	0	4.56	.874	—	—	—	—	—	—	—	—
AHL totals			27	12	8	1	1357	57	3	2.52	0.900	—	—	—	—	—	—	—	—

== Awards and honors ==
Award	Year
College
All-ECAC Hockey First Team	2012–13
AHCA East First-Team All-American	2012–13
USA Hockey College Player of the Year	2012–13
AHL
Goalie of the month (January)	2014

Awards and achievements
Preceded by Austin Smith	ECAC Hockey Player of the Year; 2012–13	Succeeded by Greg Carey; Shayne Gostisbehere
Preceded by Troy Grosenick	Ken Dryden Award; 2012–13	Succeeded by Colin Stevens
