= Chris Wagner =

American ice hockey player (born 1991)

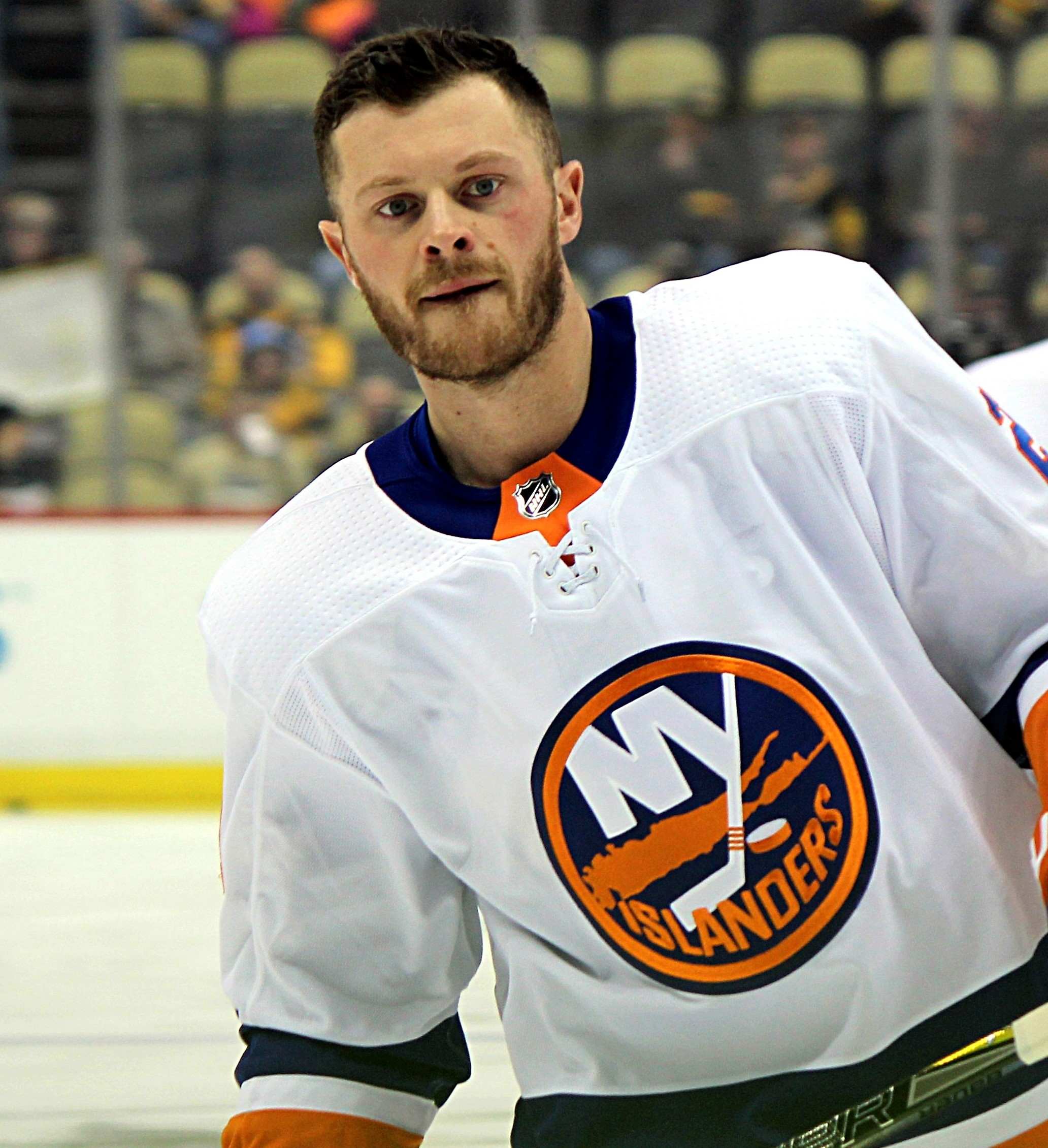
- Wagner with the New York Islanders in 2018
- Born: May 27, 1991 (age 35) Needham, Massachusetts, U.S.
- Height: 6 ft 0 in (183 cm)
- Weight: 198 lb (90 kg; 14 st 2 lb)
- Position: Center
- Shoots: Right
- AHL team Former teams: Springfield Thunderbirds; Anaheim Ducks; Colorado Avalanche; New York Islanders; Boston Bruins
- NHL draft: 122nd overall, 2010; Anaheim Ducks
- Playing career: 2012–present

Christopher Wagner (born May 27, 1991) is an American professional ice hockey forward for the Springfield Thunderbirds of the American Hockey League (AHL). Wagner was selected by the Anaheim Ducks in the fifth round (122nd overall) of the 2010 NHL entry draft.

== Playing career ==
=== Early career ===
As a youth, Wagner played in the 2004 Quebec International Pee-Wee Hockey Tournament with the South Shore Kings. Attended and played hockey at Xaverian Brothers High School in Westwood, Massachusetts.

=== Amateur ===
Wagner as a Massachusetts native played junior hockey in the Eastern Junior Hockey League with the South Shore Kings where he and his family lived. In his second season with the Kings in 2009–10 as an 18-year-old, Wagner matched an EJHL single-season scoring record with 83 points in only 44 games. He captained the team to the Southern Division Championship before committing to play collegiate hockey with the Colgate Raiders of the ECAC conference in the NCAA. Wagner's development promise gained notice and as a result was he was selected by the Anaheim Ducks in the 2010 NHL entry draft.

In his freshman season with the Raiders in 2010–11, he led rookies in team scoring with nine goals and 28 points in 41 games. Wagner continued his upswing in potential the following season by leading Colgate and placing second in the ECAC in scoring. His 51 points in 38 games led all NCAA underclassmen and he was selected in the Second All-Star Team. His two-way presence was noticed as he finished as a finalist for the ECAC's best defensive forward. On April 3, 2012, Wagner ended his collegiate career prematurely when he was signed to a three-year entry-level contract with the Anaheim Ducks.

=== Professional ===
Wagner made his professional debut with the Ducks' AHL affiliate, the Norfolk Admirals to open the 2012–13 season, in a contest against the Worcester Sharks on October 12, 2012. In remaining with the Admirals for the duration of the year, Wagner appeared in 70 games with 8 goals and 21 points. In his second season, Wagner continued his development in Norfolk, ending the 2013–14 season, as the only player to appear in every game.

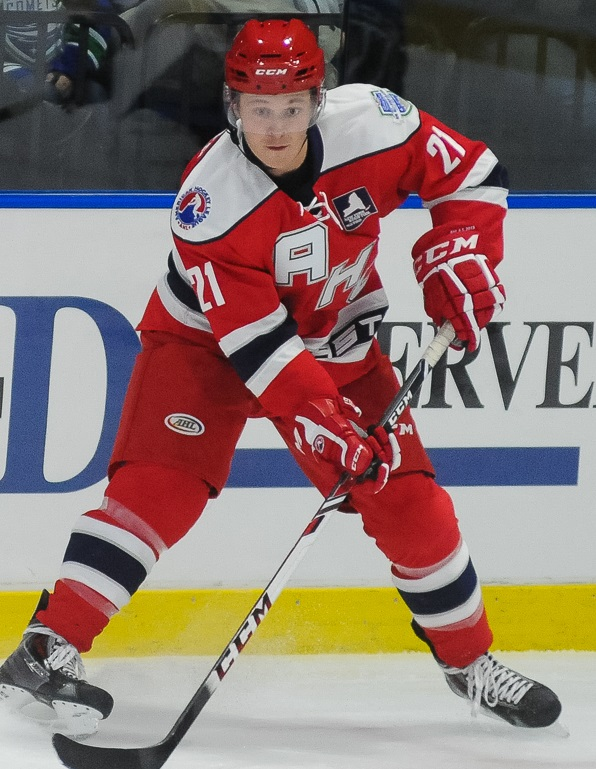
Wagner at the 2015 AHL All Star Game

Approaching the final year of his entry-level deal, Wagner was amongst the last cuts to make the Ducks opening night roster for the 2014–15 season. Wagner immediately responded in Norfolk to earn AHL player-of-week honors to open the season. He was soon recalled by the Ducks from the Admirals and made his NHL debut in 2–1 victory over the Minnesota Wild on October 17, 2014. Wagner was recalled on several occasions during the season, used in a physical checking-line role finishing scoreless over 9 games. He increased his scoring presence in the AHL with the Admirals, earning a selection to the AHL All-Star Game. At the conclusion of the Admirals season he was recalled for the Ducks post-season and made his playoff debut in the opening round victory over the Winnipeg Jets.

As a restricted free agent, Wagner was signed by the Ducks to a one-year extension on July 17, 2015. Wagner was amongst the Ducks' most impressive during the pre-season, and made his first NHL opening night roster to begin the 2015–16 season. As the Ducks extra forward, he featured in one game before he was exposed to his waiver eligibility, upon being assigned to new AHL affiliate, the San Diego Gulls on October 21, 2015. He was recalled to Anaheim after three games with the Gulls and played in a further 10 scoreless games with the Ducks as their fourth-line center before he was again placed on waivers. On November 15, 2015, Wagner was claimed off waivers by the Colorado Avalanche. He made his Avalanche debut two days later on the November 17, in a 5–1 road loss to the Toronto Maple Leafs. In his fifth game with the Avalanche, Wagner scored his first NHL goal in a 5–3 loss to the Ottawa Senators on November 25, 2015. Wagner remained on the Avalanche in a rotating role on the fourth-line. After 26 games posting 4 goals, Wagner was placed back on waivers by the Avalanche on February 24, 2016. The following day he was re-claimed by the Anaheim Ducks and directly assigned to AHL affiliate in the Gulls.

On February 26, 2018, the day of the trade deadline in the 2017–18 season, Wagner was traded to the New York Islanders in exchange for Jason Chimera. Wagner played out the remainder of the season, posting just 1 goal in 15 games as the Islanders finished out of playoff contention.

On July 1, 2018, having left the Islanders as a free agent, Wagner signed a two-year deal worth $2.5 million with his hometown club the Boston Bruins. In returning home, Wagner quickly found his role in the Bruins bottom six forwards for the 2018–19 season, establishing career highs with 12 goals and 19 points in 76 regular season games. Adding depth to the Bruins in the post-season, Wagner recorded 2 goals in 12 games before suffering a season ending injury which rendered him unavailable to participate in the 2019 Stanley Cup Finals where the Bruins fell to the St. Louis Blues in seven games.

On November 27, 2019, Wagner (in the final year of his contract) signed a three-year, $4.05 million contract extension with the Bruins.

On October 9, 2021, Wagner was placed on waivers and cleared.

Wagner was called up for the final game of the 2021–22 season in order to rest key Bruins players ahead of the playoffs. In his sole regular season game, Wagner registered 11 hits, winning him a spot on the roster for the upcoming playoffs. Wagner made his playoff debut that year in Game 3 of the Bruins first round series against the Carolina Hurricanes.

Wagner was once again assigned to Providence at the beginning of the 2022–23 season. After an injury to Jake DeBrusk, Wagner was recalled to the NHL team on January 5, 2023. He played one game before being sent back down to the AHL, where he spent the rest of the season.

Following five seasons within the Bruins organization, Wagner left as a free agent and was signed to a one-year, two-way contract in a returning to former club, the Colorado Avalanche, on July 1, 2023. During off-season training, Wagner ruptured his achilles tendon, ruling him out indefinitely into the 2023–24 season. He missed the first half of the season rehabilitating his injury before he was placed on waivers and re-assigned to AHL affiliate, the Colorado Eagles, upon his return to health on January 11, 2024.

Wagner left the Avalanche organization after two seasons as a free agent. He opted to continue his career in the AHL, signing a two-year contract with the Springfield Thunderbirds, affiliate to the St. Louis Blues, on July 1, 2025. He would be named captain for the remainder of the 2025–26 season on March 11 after Matthew Peca was traded to the Syracuse Crunch.

== Career statistics ==
			Regular season					Playoffs
Season	Team	League	GP	G	A	Pts	PIM	GP	G	A	Pts	PIM
2008–09	South Shore Kings	EJHL	38	20	14	34	72	2	2	0	2	0
2009–10	South Shore Kings	EJHL	44	34	49	83	70	4	3	6	9	8
2010–11	Colgate University	ECAC	41	9	10	19	26	—	—	—	—	—
2011–12	Colgate University	ECAC	38	17	34	51	69	—	—	—	—	—
2012–13	Norfolk Admirals	AHL	70	8	13	21	65	—	—	—	—	—
2013–14	Norfolk Admirals	AHL	76	14	14	28	68	10	2	3	5	10
2014–15	Norfolk Admirals	AHL	48	15	13	28	65	—	—	—	—	—
2014–15	Anaheim Ducks	NHL	9	0	0	0	2	2	0	0	0	0
2015–16	Anaheim Ducks	NHL	17	0	2	2	19	2	0	0	0	0
2015–16	San Diego Gulls	AHL	15	6	4	10	22	7	2	2	4	4
2015–16	Colorado Avalanche	NHL	26	4	0	4	9	—	—	—	—	—
2016–17	Anaheim Ducks	NHL	43	6	1	7	6	17	3	0	3	6
2016–17	San Diego Gulls	AHL	30	12	7	19	18	—	—	—	—	—
2017–18	Anaheim Ducks	NHL	64	6	9	15	35	—	—	—	—	—
2017–18	New York Islanders	NHL	15	1	0	1	2	—	—	—	—	—
2018–19	Boston Bruins	NHL	76	12	7	19	51	12	2	0	2	2
2019–20	Boston Bruins	NHL	67	6	4	10	47	12	2	1	3	4
2020–21	Boston Bruins	NHL	41	2	3	5	24	11	0	0	0	2
2021–22	Providence Bruins	AHL	62	15	12	27	39	—	—	—	—	—
2021–22	Boston Bruins	NHL	1	0	0	0	0	3	0	0	0	0
2022–23	Providence Bruins	AHL	62	19	12	31	69	3	0	0	0	2
2022–23	Boston Bruins	NHL	1	0	0	0	0	—	—	—	—	—
2023–24	Colorado Eagles	AHL	21	8	6	14	20	3	1	0	1	0
2023–24	Colorado Avalanche	NHL	13	1	1	2	9	2	0	0	0	0
2024–25	Colorado Avalanche	NHL	28	1	0	1	14	—	—	—	—	—
2024–25	Colorado Eagles	AHL	44	19	12	31	47	9	2	1	3	16
2025–26	Springfield Thunderbirds	AHL	67	24	26	50	61	11	2	5	7	24
NHL totals			401	39	27	66	218	61	7	1	8	14

== Awards and honors ==
Award	Year
EJHL
MVP	2009–10
Offensive Player of the Year	2009–10
College
All-ECAC Hockey Second Team	2011–12
Boston Bruins
NESN Boston Bruins 7th Player Award	2019
