= Keith Allain =

American ice hockey coach (born 1958)

Biographical details
- Born: September 26, 1958 (age 68); Worcester, Massachusetts, U.S.
- Education: Yale University

Playing career
- 1976–1980: Yale
- 1980–1982: Väsby IK
- Position: Goaltender

Coaching career (HC unless noted)
- 1984–1985: Yale (Asst.)
- 1993–1997: Washington Capitals (Asst.)
- 2002–2003: Worcester IceCats (Goalie)
- 2003: St. Louis Blues (Goalie)
- 2003–2005: Worcester IceCats (Goalie)
- 2005–2006: St. Louis Blues (Goalie)
- 2006–2025: Yale

Head coaching record
- Overall: 282–254–54 (.524)
- Tournaments: 6–5 (.545)

Accomplishments and honors

Championships
- 2009 ECAC Champion; 2009 ECAC Tournament champion 2010 ECAC Champion; 2011 ECAC tournament champion 2013 NCAA National Champion; 7× Ivy League Champion (2007, 2009, 2010, 2011, 2013, 2015, 2016)

Awards
- 2009 Tim Taylor Award; 2× Ivy League Coach of the Year (2015, 2016)

Records
- Most wins in one season in Yale history (28)

Keith Allain (born September 26, 1958) is an American retired ice hockey coach and player. He was formerly the head coach of the Yale Bulldogs men's ice hockey team. He took over the program following Tim Taylor in 2006. In 2013, he led Yale to its first ever NCAA men's ice hockey National Championship. It would eventually become his last victory over Quinnipiac of his career.

Allain, who played as a goaltender with the Yale Bulldogs men's ice hockey team, was an assistant coach in the National Hockey League with the Washington Capitals from 1993–1997, and also served as the goaltending coach for the St. Louis Blues from 1998 to 2006.

Allain served as an assistant coach with the United States men's national ice hockey team at the 1992, 2006, and 2018 Winter Olympics.

Allain announced his retirement on August 9, 2025.

== Playing career statistics ==
			Regular season					Postseason
Season	Team	League	GP	A	PIM	GAA	SV%	GP	A	PIM	GAA	SV%
1976–77	Yale Bulldogs	ECAC Hockey	23	0	8	5.50	—	—	—	—	—	—
1977–78	Yale Bulldogs	ECAC Hockey	20	0	0	4.38	.863	—	—	—	—	—
1978–79	Yale Bulldogs	ECAC Hockey	16	0	0	4.56	—	—	—	—	—	—
1979–80	Yale Bulldogs	ECAC Hockey	16	0	0	4.50	—	—	—	—	—	—
NCAA totals			39	0	8	4.79	—	—	—	—	—	—

== Head coaching record ==
Record table
Season	Team	Overall	Conference	Standing	Postseason
Yale Bulldogs (ECAC Hockey) (2006–2025)
2006–07	Yale	18–15–0	11–9–0	T-10th	ECAC first round
2007–08	Yale	11–17–3	8–13–1	T-6th	ECAC quarterfinals
2008–09	Yale	24–8–2	15–5–2	1st	NCAA regional semifinals
2009–10	Yale	21–10–3	15–5–2	1st	NCAA Regional finals
2010–11	Yale	28–7–1	17–4–1	2nd	NCAA Regional finals
2011–12	Yale	16–16–3	10–10–2	6th	ECAC quarterfinals
2012–13	Yale	22–12–3	12–9–1	3rd	NCAA Champions
2013–14	Yale	17–11–5	10–8–4	T-5th	ECAC quarterfinals
2014–15	Yale	18–10–5	12–6–4	3rd	NCAA regional semifinals
2015–16	Yale	19–9–4	14–5–3	2nd	NCAA regional semifinals
2016–17	Yale	13–15–5	7–11–4	8th	ECAC quarterfinals
2017–18	Yale	15–15–1	10–11–1	8th	ECAC first round
2018–19	Yale	15–15–3	11–10–1	T-5th	ECAC quarterfinals
2019–20	Yale	15–15–2	10–10–2	6th	ECAC quarterfinals
2021–22	Yale	8–21–1	7–14–1	T–11th	ECAC first round
2022–23	Yale	8–20–4	6–14–2	10th	ECAC quarterfinals
2023–24	Yale	10–18–2	7–13–2	T–9th	ECAC first round
2024–25	Yale	6–21–3	5–14–3	11th	ECAC first round
Yale:		282–254–54	192–176–36		
Total:		282–254–54			
National champion Postseason invitational champion Conference regular season champion Conference regular season and conference tournament champion Division regular season champion Division regular season and conference tournament champion Conference tournament champion

Awards and achievements
Preceded by Guy Gadowsky	Tim Taylor Award; 2008–09	Succeeded by Nate Leaman
