= 2015–16 Yale Bulldogs men's ice hockey season =

College ice hockey season

Ivy League Co-Champions NCAA East Regional semifinal, L 2–3 OT vs. UMass-Lowell
- Conference: 2nd ECAC Hockey
- Home ice: Ingalls Rink

Rankings
- USCHO: #11
- USA Today: #10

Record
- Overall: 19–9–4
- Conference: 14–5–3
- Home: 8–5–1
- Road: 8–3–2
- Neutral: 3–1–1

Coaches and captains
- Head coach: Keith Allain
- Assistant coaches: Josh Siembida; Ryan Donald; Stephen Volek; Nick Costanzo
- Captain: Mitch Witek

The 2015–16 Yale Bulldogs men's ice hockey team represented Yale University in the 2015–16 NCAA Division I men's ice hockey season. The team was coached by Keith Allain, '80, his tenth season behind the bench at Yale. His assistant coaches were Jason Guerriero, Josh Siembida, and Stephen Volek. The Bulldogs played their home games at Ingalls Rink on the campus of Yale University, competing in the ECAC.

== Offseason ==
Seven Senior Bulldogs graduated in May: Captain Tommy Fallen – D, Anthony Day – F, Matt Killian – D, Trent Ruffolo – F, Nicholas Weberg – F, and Connor Wilson – G.

On April 22, 2015, it was announced that Senior defensemen Mitch Witek was named Captain for the 2015–16 season.

On July 6, 2015, Josh Siembida was promoted from Volunteer Goalie Coach for Yale to a full-time Assistant Coach.

On October 5, 2015, Ryan Donald, a 2010 Yale graduate and the 2009-10 Yale hockey team captain, was named Assistant Coach of the Bulldogs.

== Recruiting ==
Yale added seven freshmen for the 2015–16 season: four forwards, two defensemen, and one goalie.

Player	Position	Nationality	Notes
Charlie Curti	Defense	United States	Mound, Mn; Played for the Cedar Rapids RoughRiders (USHL)
Andrew Gaus	Forward	United States	Wexford, PA; Played for the Cedar Rapids RoughRiders (USHL)
Ted Hart	Forward	United States	Cumberland, ME; Played for Phillips Exeter Academy
J.M. Piotrowski	Forward	United States	Irving, TX; Played for the Sioux City Musketeers (USHL)
Joe Snively	Forward	United States	Herndon, VA; Played for the Sioux City Musketeers (USHL)
Sam Tucker	Goalie	United States	Wilton, CT; Played for Choate Rosemary Hall (USHS-CT)
Anthony Walsh	Defense	United States	Burr Ridge, IL; Played for the Green Bay Gamblers (USHL)

== 2015-16 Roster ==
=== Departures from 2014–2015 team ===
- Anthony Day, F - Graduation
- Tommy Fallen, D - Graduation
- Matt Killian, D - Graduation
- Trent Ruffolo, F - Graduation
- Nicholas Weberg, F - Graduation
- Connor Wilson, G - Graduation

=== 2015-16 Bulldogs ===
As of December 22, 2015.

No.	Nat.	Player	Class	Pos	Height	Weight	DoB	Hometown	Previous team	NHL rights
1	(United States)	Sam Tucker	Freshman	G	6' 2" (1.88 m)	180 lb (82 kg)	1996-04-16	Wilton, Connecticut	Choate Rosemary Hall (USHS–CT)	—
2	(United States)	Adam Larkin	Sophomore	D	6' 1" (1.85 m)	182 lb (83 kg)	1995-01-28	Clarkston, Michigan	Muskegon Lumberjacks (USHL)	—
3	(United States)	Dan O'Keefe	Junior	D	6' 3" (1.91 m)	205 lb (93 kg)	1994-03-06	North Wall, New Jersey	Surrey Eagles (BCHL)	—
4	(United States)	Rob O'Gara	Senior	D	6' 4" (1.93 m)	205 lb (93 kg)	1993-07-06	Nesconset, New York	Milton Academy (USHS–MA)	BOS, 151st overall 2011
5	(United States)	Tim Bonner	Junior	F	5' 9" (1.75 m)	175 lb (79 kg)	1992-08-19	Plymouth, Minnesota	Tri-City Storm (USHL)	—
6	(United States)	Stu Wilson	Senior	F	5' 10" (1.78 m)	170 lb (77 kg)	1991-11-15	Pittsford, New York	Cedar Rapids RoughRiders (USHL)	—
7	(United States)	Joe Snively	Freshman	F	5' 9" (1.75 m)	165 lb (75 kg)	1996-01-01	Herndon, Virginia	Sioux City Musketeers (USHL)	—
9	(Canada)	Carson Cooper	Senior	F	5' 11" (1.8 m)	191 lb (87 kg)	1992-03-18	Bow Island, Alberta	Fort McMurray Oil Barons (AJHL)	—
10	(United States)	Mitch Witek (C)	Senior	D	6' 1" (1.85 m)	205 lb (93 kg)	1992-02-04	Downers Grove, Illinois	Waterloo Black Hawks (USHL)	—
11	(United States)	Andrew Gaus	Freshman	F	6' 0" (1.83 m)	185 lb (84 kg)	1995-02-23	Wexford, Pennsylvania	Cedar Rapids RoughRiders (USHL)	—
12	(United States)	Cody Learned	Senior	F	5' 9" (1.75 m)	175 lb (79 kg)	1991-10-02	Amherst, New Hampshire	Boston Junior Bruins (EJHL)	—
13	(United States)	Matthew Beattie	Senior	F	6' 3" (1.91 m)	190 lb (86 kg)	1992-12-14	Whitehouse Station, New Jersey	Phillips Exeter Academy (USHS–NH)	VAN, 207th overall 2012
14	(United States)	Ryan Obuchowski	Senior	D	6' 1" (1.85 m)	185 lb (84 kg)	1992-06-07	West Bloomfield, Michigan	Indiana Ice (USHL)	—
15	(United States)	Henry Hart	Sophomore	F	5' 7" (1.7 m)	155 lb (70 kg)	1994-09-27	Stillwater, Minnesota	Phillips Exeter Academy (USHS–NH)	—
16	(United States)	Anthony Walsh	Freshman	D	5' 9" (1.75 m)	180 lb (82 kg)	1995-09-21	Burr Ridge, Illinois	Green Bay Gamblers (USHL)	—
17	(United States)	Frankie DiChiara	Junior	F	6' 2" (1.88 m)	218 lb (99 kg)	1993-09-22	Ronkonkoma, New York	Dubuque Fighting Saints (USHL)	—
18	(United States)	Nate Repensky	Sophomore	D	5' 11" (1.8 m)	180 lb (82 kg)	1993-11-22	Duluth, Minnesota	Bismarck Bobcats (NAHL)	—
19	(United States)	Ted Hart	Freshman	F	6' 1" (1.85 m)	185 lb (84 kg)	1996-02-20	Cumberland, Maine	Phillips Exeter Academy (USHS–NH)	—
20	(United States)	John Baiocco	Sophomore	F	5' 8" (1.73 m)	170 lb (77 kg)	1995-06-06	New Vernon, New Jersey	Dubuque Fighting Saints (USHL)	—
21	(United States)	John Hayden	Junior	F	6' 3" (1.91 m)	210 lb (95 kg)	1995-02-14	Greenwich, Connecticut	USNTDP (USHL)	CHI, 74th overall 2013
22	(United States)	J. M. Piotrowski	Freshman	F	6' 2" (1.88 m)	185 lb (84 kg)	1995-05-01	Irving, Texas	Sioux City Musketeers (USHL)	—
23	(United States)	Charlie Curti	Freshman	D	6' 0" (1.83 m)	192 lb (87 kg)	1995-05-24	Mound, Minnesota	Cedar Rapids RoughRiders (USHL)	—
24	(United States)	Mike Doherty	Junior	F	5' 11" (1.8 m)	170 lb (77 kg)	1993-08-21	Reading, Massachusetts	Middlesex Islanders (EJHL)	—
25	(United States)	Chris Izmirlian	Junior	F	5' 10" (1.78 m)	185 lb (84 kg)	1992-12-28	Highland Beach, Florida	Middlesex Islanders (EJHL)	—
27	(United States)	Charles Orzetti	Senior	F	6' 4" (1.93 m)	223 lb (101 kg)	1992-02-02	Ridgewood, New Jersey	Surrey Eagles (BCHL)	—
28	(United States)	Ryan Hitchcock	Sophomore	F	5' 10" (1.78 m)	170 lb (77 kg)	1996-03-30	Manhasset, New York	USNTDP (USHL)	—
30	(Canada)	Patrick Spano	Junior	G	6' 1" (1.85 m)	180 lb (82 kg)	1993-03-01	Montreal, Quebec	Cowichan Valley Capitals (BCHL)	—
34	(United States)	Alex Lyon	Junior	G	6' 1" (1.85 m)	200 lb (91 kg)	1992-12-09	Baudette, Minnesota	Omaha Lancers (USHL)	—

=== Coaching staff ===
Name	Position	Seasons Coaching at Yale University	Alma mater
Keith Allain	Head Coach	14	Yale University (1980)
Josh Siembida	Assistant coach	3	Quinnipiac (2006)
Ryan Donald	Assistant coach	1	Yale University (2010)
Stephen Volek	Assistant director Strength & Conditioning	2	Penn State (2010)
Nick Costanzo	Volunteer Coach	1	Johnson and Wales University (2013)

== Standings ==
- 2015–16 ECAC Hockey men's standings
  	Conference record							Overall record					
  	GP	W	L	T	PTS	GF	GA	GP	W	L	T	GF	GA
  #2 Quinnipiac † *	22	16	1	5	37	84	44	43	32	4	7	163	85
  #10 Yale	22	14	5	3	31	57	37	32	19	9	4	86	57
  #9 Harvard	22	12	6	4	28	72	47	34	19	11	4	116	81
  #17 St. Lawrence	22	11	8	3	25	68	50	37	19	14	4	106	84
  Clarkson	22	10	9	3	23	52	51	38	20	15	3	101	95
  Rensselaer	22	8	7	7	23	47	49	40	18	15	7	97	104
  Dartmouth	22	11	11	0	22	60	69	35	18	16	1	94	104
  #18 Cornell	22	8	8	6	22	46	50	34	16	11	7	79	82
  Union	22	6	10	6	18	53	62	36	13	14	9	91	96
  Colgate	22	6	14	2	14	45	71	37	11	24	2	95	132
  Brown	22	3	13	6	12	47	70	31	5	19	7	75	107
  Princeton	22	3	16	3	9	40	71	31	5	23	3	60	99
  Championship: March 19, 2016 † indicates conference regular season champion (Cleary Cup) * indicates conference tournament champion (Whitelaw Cup); Rankings: USCHO.com Top 20 Poll; updated March 8, 2016

== Schedule ==
Date	Time	Opponent^{#}	Rank^{#}	Site	TV	Decision	Result	Attendance	Record
Exhibition
December 29	7:00 pm	McGill*	#13	Ingalls Rink • New Haven, CT		Lyon	W 4-1	3,215	6-4-2 (3-3-2)
Regular season
October 30	7:30 pm	vs. Princeton*	#13	Sun Center • Trenton, NJ (Capital City Classic)		Lyon	W 3-1	1,200	1-0-0 (0-0-0)
October 31	7:30 pm	vs. Massachusetts*	#13	Sun Center • Trenton, NJ (Capital City Classic)		Lyon	W 6-1	530	2-0-0 (0-0-0)
November 6	7:00 pm	at #7 Harvard	#12	Bright Hockey Center • Cambridge, MA	NESN+	Lyon	T 2–2 ^{OT}	3,095	2–0–1 (0–0–1)
November 7	7:00 pm	at Dartmouth	#12	Thompson Arena • Hanover, NH		Lyon	W 3-2	2,506	3-0-1 (1-0-1)
November 13	7:00 pm	at RPI	#10	Houston Field House • Troy, NY	RPI TV	Lyon	L 2-3 ^{OT}	3,019	3-1-1 (1-1-1)
November 14	7:00 pm	at Union	#10	Achilles Rink • Schenectady, NY		Lyon	W 2-1 ^{OT}	2,017	4-1-1 (2-1-1)
November 20	7:00 pm	Cornell	#11	Ingalls Rink • New Haven, CT		Lyon	T 0-0 ^{OT}	3,500	4-1-2 (2-1-2)
November 21	7:00 pm	Colgate	#11	Ingalls Rink • New Haven, CT		Lyon	W 3-1	3,500	5-1-2 (3-1-2)
November 28	7:00 pm	at #1 Providence*	#10	Schneider Arena • Providence, RI	OSN	Lyon	L 3-4	3,030	5-2-2 (3-1-2)
December 4	6:30 pm	#3 Quinnipiac	#10	Ingalls Rink • New Haven, CT	ASN	Lyon	L 0-3	3,500	5-3-2 (3-2-2)
December 6	7:00 pm	Princeton	#10	Ingalls Rink • New Haven, CT		Lyon	L 2-4	3,145	5-4-2 (3-3-2)
December 11	7:00 pm	Boston University*	#15	Ingalls Rink • New Haven, CT	ESPN3	Lyon	W 3-2	3,500	6-4-2 (3-3-2)
January 5	7:00 pm	at Massachusetts*	#12	Mullins Center • Amherst, MA		Lyon	W 3-2 ^{OT}	1,313	7-4-2 (3-3-2)
January 8	10:00 pm	vs. Arizona State*	#12	Gila River Arena • Glendale, AZ (Desert Hockey Classic)	Pac-12 Network	Lyon	W 4-0	5,028	8-4-2 (3-3-2)
January 10	12:00 pm	vs. Michigan Tech*	#12	Gila River Arena • Glendale, AZ (Desert Hockey Classic)	Pac-12 Network	Lyon	T 1-1 ^{OT}		8-4-3 (3-3-2)
January 15	7:00 pm	Brown	#12	Ingalls Rink • New Haven, CT		Lyon	W 3-2	3,500	9-4-3 (4-3-2)
January 16	7:00 pm	at Brown	#12	Meehan Auditorium • Providence, RI		Lyon	W 2-1 ^{OT}	1,452	10-4-3 (5-3-2)
January 22	7:00 pm	at Clarkson	#12	Cheel Arena • Potsdam, NY		Lyon	T 2-2 ^{OT}	2,186	10-4-4 (5-3-3)
January 23	7:00 pm	at St. Lawrence	#12	Appleton Arena • Canton, NY		Lyon	W 3-2	1,545	11-4-4 (6-3-3)
January 29	7:00 pm	Union	#11	Ingalls Rink • New Haven, CT	ESPN3	Lyon	L 1-2	3,500	11-5-4 (6-4-3)
January 30	7:00 pm	#16 RPI	#11	Ingalls Rink • New Haven, CT		Lyon	W 3-0	3,500	12-5-4 (7-4-3)
February 5	7:00 pm	Dartmouth	#11	Ingalls Rink • New Haven, CT	ESPN3	Lyon	W 5-1	3,500	13-5-4 (8-4-3)
February 6	7:00 pm	#7 Harvard	#11	Ingalls Rink • New Haven, CT		Lyon	W 2-1	3,500	14-5-4 (9-4-3)
February 12	7:00 pm	at Colgate	#10	Starr Rink • Hamilton, NY		Lyon	W 3-0	1,397	15-5-4 (10-4-3)
February 13	7:00 pm	at #15 Cornell	#10	Lynah Rink • Ithaca, NY		Lyon	W 4-2	4,267	16-5-4 (11-4-3)
February 19	7:00 pm	#18 St. Lawrence	#8	Ingalls Rink • New Haven, CT		Lyon	W 4-3	3,500	17-5-4 (12-4-3)
February 20	7:00 pm	#20 Clarkson	#8	Ingalls Rink • New Haven, CT		Lyon	W 3-1	3,500	18-5-4 (13-4-3)
February 26	7:00 pm	at Princeton	#7	Hobey Baker Memorial Rink • Princeton, NJ		Lyon	W 6-0	2,084	19-5-4 (14-4-3)
February 27	7:00 pm	at #1 Quinnipiac	#7	TD Bank Sports Center • Hamden, CT (Heroes Hat)	SNY	Lyon	L 1-4	3,696	19-6-4 (14-5-3)
ECAC Tournament
March 11	7:00 pm	Dartmouth*	#7	Ingalls Rink • New Haven, CT (ECAC Tournament Quarterfinals)		Lyon	L 3-4 ^{OT}	3,500	19-7-4 (14-5-3)
March 12	7:00 pm	Dartmouth*	#7	Ingalls Rink • New Haven, CT (ECAC Tournament Quarterfinals)		Lyon	L 1-2	3,500	19-8-4 (14-5-3)
NCAA Tournament
March 26	7:30 pm	vs. #8 UMass-Lowell*	#11	Times Union Center • Albany, NY (NCAA East Regional semifinal)	ESPN3	Lyon	L 2-3 ^{OT}		19-9-4 (14-5-3)
*Non-conference game. ^{#}Rankings from USCHO.com Poll. All times are in Eastern Time.

- On September 21, Yale was picked to win the ECAC Hockey Title by the ECAC Hockey Media Association, with 10 first place votes.
- On October 31, the Bulldogs beat Massachusetts 6–1 to win the Capital City Classic at the Sun Center.
- On January 5, Yale's Ryan Hitchcock was away, representing the United States at the 2016 World Junior Ice Hockey Championships in Helsinki, Finland. The US beat Sweden 8–3 to win the bronze medal.
- On January 10, the Bulldogs lost to Michigan Tech 2–1 in a shootout to finish 2nd in the inaugural Desert Hockey Classic at the Gila River Arena.
- On January 30, Alex Lyon broke the school record for most wins in a career which was previously 42 by Alex Westlund.
- On February 10, the ECAC suspended senior defenseman Rob O'Gara for two games due to his actions in the third period of the game against Harvard on February 6.
- On March 20, the NCAA tournament Selection Committee placed Yale as the 3-seed in the East Regional at Albany, playing 1-seed UMass-Lowell in the first round.
- On March 26, Yale lost to 2-seed UMass-Lowell in OT by a score of 3–2 in the first round.

== Rankings ==
Poll	Week																							
Poll	Pre	1	2	3	4	5	6	7	8	9	10	11	12	13	14	15	16	17	18	19	20	21	22	23 (Final)
USCHO.com	12	13	13	13	12	10	11	10	10	15	13	12	12	12	11	11	10	8	7	8	7	10	11	11
USA Today	12	14	15	15	9	8	10	9	10	15	12	12	12	12	12	11	10	8	7	8	7	11	12	10

== Statistics ==
As of the completion of the season.

=== Skaters ===
No.	Player	POS	YR	GP	G	A	Pts	PIM	PP	SHG	GWG	+/-	SOG
7	Joe Snively	F	FR	32	10	18	28	12	2	0	0	+5	75
6	Stu Wilson	F	SR	31	8	18	26	8	3	0	2	+1	112
21	John Hayden	F	JR	32	16	7	23	26	6	0	5	+2	136
17	Frankie DiChiara	F	JR	32	7	8	15	18	1	0	0	+4	78
28	Ryan Hitchcock	F	SO	22	8	6	14	0	2	0	1	E	40
12	Cody Learned	F	SR	31	6	6	12	6	0	1	2	+8	42
25	Chris Izmirlian	F	JR	27	4	8	12	10	0	0	1	+6	58
4	Rob O'Gara	D	SR	30	4	8	12	41	1	0	1	+5	61
14	Ryan Obuchowski	D	SR	32	4	8	12	20	2	0	1	+5	63
24	Mike Doherty	F	JR	22	2	10	12	23	1	0	0	+5	55
10	Mitch Witek	D	SR	32	0	12	12	2	0	0	0	+12	63
9	Carson Cooper	F	SR	30	3	8	11	28	1	0	0	+4	57
19	Ted Hart	F	FR	24	3	6	9	4	0	0	2	-2	41
11	Andrew Gaus	F	FR	18	3	1	4	2	1	0	2	-5	44
22	JM Piotrowski	F	FR	28	3	1	4	10	0	0	2	+4	39
18	Nate Repensky	D	SO	13	1	3	4	6	1	0	0	E	18
23	Charlie Curti	D	FR	23	1	3	4	2	1	0	0	-5	22
2	Adam Larkin	D	SO	30	0	3	3	4	0	0	0	E	23
16	Anthony Walsh	D	FR	27	2	0	2	12	0	0	0	+2	28
15	Henry Hart	F	SO	17	1	1	2	0	0	0	0	+4	6
3	Dan O'Keefe	D	JR	10	0	2	2	2	0	0	0	+2	4
34	Alex Lyon	G	JR	31	0	1	1	0	0	0	0	+15	0
30	Patrick Spano	G	JR	1	0	0	0	0	0	0	0	-2	0
20	John Baiocco	F	SO	4	0	0	0	2	0	0	0	+1	5
27	Charles Orzetti	F	SR	24	0	0	0	6	0	0	0	-1	17
	Bench							2					
	Team			32	86	138	224	246	22	1	19	+12	1087

=== Goaltenders ===
No.	Player	POS	YR	GP	MIN	W	L	T	GA	GAA	SA	SV	SV%	SO
34	Alex Lyon	JR	G	31	1905:37	19	8	4	52	1.64	818	766	.936	5
30	Patrick Spano	JR	G	1	59:18	0	1	0	3	3.04	30	27	.900	0
	Empty Net			11	5:24				2		2			
	Team			32	1970:19	19	8	4	57	1.74	850	793	.933	5

== Awards and honors ==
=== Preseason awards ===
ECAC All-League Team

- Alex Lyon, G - Preseason All-League Team
- Rob O'Gara, D - Preseason All-League Team

=== Weekly awards ===
ECAC Player of the Week

- John Hayden, F – Week of December 15, 2015

ECAC Rookie of the Week

- Joe Snively, F – Week of November 3, 2015
- Joe Snively, F – Week of February 23, 2016

ECAC Goaltender of the Week

- Alex Lyon, G – Week of November 3, 2015
- Alex Lyon, G – Week of November 10, 2015
- Alex Lyon, G – Week of February 16, 2015

American Sports Network Player of the Week

- Alex Lyon, G – Week of February 9, 2016

College Hockey News Warrior Player of the Week

- Alex Lyon, G – Week of February 16, 2016

=== Monthly awards ===
ECAC Rookie of the Month

- Joe Snively, F – Month of January 2016

ECAC Goaltender of the Month

- Alex Lyon, G – Month of January 2016
- Alex Lyon, G – Month of February 2016

=== Postseason awards ===
Ivy League All-Stars

- Stu Wilson, F – 1st Team All-Ivy
- Rob O'Gara, D – 1st Team All-Ivy
- Alex Lyon, G – 1st Team All-Ivy
- Ryan Obuchowski, F – 2nd Team All-Ivy
- John Hayden, F – Honorable Mention All-Ivy
- Joe Snively, F – Honorable Mention All-Ivy
- Mitch Witek, D – Honorable Mention All-Ivy

Ivy League Awards

- Joe Snively, F – Ivy League Rookie of the Year
- Keith Allain – Ivy League Coach of the Year

ECAC All-Stars

- Rob O'Gara, D – First Team All-League
- Alex Lyon, G – First Team All-League
- Joe Snively, F – All-Rookie Team

ECAC Awards

- Carson Cooper, F – Best Defensive Forward
- Rob O'Gara, D – Best Defensive Defenseman
- Alex Lyon, G – Ken Dryden Goaltender of the Year
- Carson Cooper, F – Best Defensive Forward
- Joe Snively, F – Rookie of the Year
- Yale University Bulldogs – Sportsmanship Trophy
