= 2018 ECAC Hockey men's ice hockey tournament =

2018 ECAC Men's ice hockey tournament
- Dates: March 2–17, 2018
- Teams: 12
- Finals site: Herb Brooks Arena; Lake Placid, New York
- Champions: Princeton (3rd title)
- Winning coach: Ron Fogarty (1st title)
- MVP: Ryan Ferland (Princeton)
- ECAC Men's Ice Hockey Tournaments

The 2018 ECAC Hockey Men's Ice Hockey Tournament was the 57th tournament in league history. It was played between March 2 and March 17, 2018. First round and quarterfinal games were played at home team campus sites, while the final four games were played at the Herb Brooks Arena in Lake Placid, New York. By winning the tournament Princeton received the ECAC's automatic bid to the 2018 NCAA Division I Men's Ice Hockey Tournament.

== Format ==
The tournament features four rounds of play. The teams that finish above fifth place in the standings receive a bye to the quarterfinal round. In the first round, the fifth and twelfth seeds, the sixth and eleventh seeds, the seventh and tenth seeds and the eighth and ninth seeds played a best-of-three series with the winners advancing to the quarterfinals. In the quarterfinals the one seed plays the lowest remaining seed, the second seed plays the second-lowest remaining seed, the third seed plays the third-lowest remaining seed and the fourth seed plays the fourth-lowest remaining seed another best-of-three series with the winners of these the series advancing to the semifinals. In the semifinals the top remaining seed plays the lowest remaining seed while the two remaining teams play against each other. The winners of the semifinals play in the championship game, and no third-place game is played. All series after the quarterfinals are single-elimination games. The tournament champion receives an automatic bid to the 2018 NCAA Division I Men's Ice Hockey Tournament.

== Conference standings ==
Note: GP = Games played; W = Wins; L = Losses; T = Ties; PTS = Points; GF = Goals For; GA = Goals Against

2017–18 ECAC Hockey men's standings
	Conference record							Overall record					
	GP	W	L	T	PTS	GF	GA	GP	W	L	T	GF	GA
#8 Cornell†	22	17	3	2	36	61	32	33	25	6	2	102	52
Union	22	16	5	1	33	70	48	38	21	15	2	115	98
#12 Clarkson	22	12	5	5	29	74	49	40	23	11	6	122	75
Harvard	22	11	8	3	25	68	50	33	15	14	4	104	85
Dartmouth	22	11	10	1	23	55	69	35	16	17	2	83	107
Colgate	22	10	9	3	23	49	46	40	17	17	6	87	88
#15 Princeton*	22	10	10	2	22	77	79	36	19	13	4	131	110
Yale	22	10	11	1	21	67	59	31	15	15	1	87	88
Quinnipiac	22	9	11	2	20	59	56	38	16	18	4	105	106
Brown	22	7	14	1	15	45	63	31	8	19	4	67	104
Rensselaer	22	4	16	2	10	45	86	37	6	27	4	73	129
St. Lawrence	22	3	18	1	7	43	76	37	8	27	2	80	122
Championship: March 17, 2018 † indicates conference regular season champion (Cleary Cup) * indicates conference tournament champion (Whitelaw Cup); Rankings: USCHO.com Top 20 Poll; updated February 26, 2018

== Bracket ==
Teams are reseeded after the first round and quarterfinals

First Round; March 2–4
5	Dartmouth	2	2	2
12	St. Lawrence	1	4	1
6	Colgate	3	0	2
11	Rensselaer	1	1	0
7	Princeton	8	7	–
10	Brown	2	1	–
8	Yale	1	1	–
9	Quinnipiac	5	4	–

Quarterfinals; March 9–11
1	Cornell	9	2	–
9	Quinnipiac	1	0	–
2	Union	3	2	–
7	Princeton	5	3	–
3	Clarkson	1	3	5
6	Colgate	2	0	1
4	Harvard	1	7	4
5	Dartmouth	4	1	2

Semifinals; March 17
1	Cornell	1
7	Princeton	4
3	Clarkson	5*
4	Harvard	4

Championship; March 18
7	Princeton	2*
3	Clarkson	1

Note: * denotes overtime period(s)

== Results ==
=== First round ===
==== (5) Dartmouth vs. (12) St. Lawrence ====
March 2	Dartmouth	2 – 1	St. Lawrence	Thompson Arena	Recap
No scoring		First period	No scoring
(Graber, Foreman) Shane Sellar - 17:27 (Michalowski, Warpecha) Kevan Kilistoff - GW - 18:20		Second period	10:58 - Mike Marnell (Ederer, Hanson)
No scoring		Third period	No scoring
( 25 saves / 26 shots ) Devin Buffalo		Goalie stats	Arthur Brey ( 30 saves / 32 shots )

March 3	Dartmouth	2 – 4	St. Lawrence	Thompson Arena	Recap
(Strong, Yau) Ryan Blankemeier - 02:32		First period	13:49 - Cade Gleekel (Nielsen, Hanson)
(Graber, Sellar) River Rymsha - 19:29		Second period	05:48 - Mike Marnell (Ederer)
No scoring		Third period	09:53 - GW PP - Ryan Lough (Alftberg, Gluchowski); 18:48 - EN - Keenan Suthers (Sullivan)
( 18 saves / 21 shots ) Devin Buffalo		Goalie stats	Arthur Brey ( 26 saves / 28 shots )

March 4	Dartmouth	2 – 1	St. Lawrence	Thompson Arena	Recap
No scoring		First period	No scoring
(Yau, Kalk) Will Graber - PP - 06:33		Second period	18:48 - Jacob Pritchard (Gilmour)
(Baker) Corey Kalk - GW - 06:33		Third period	No scoring
( 26 saves / 27 shots ) Devin Buffalo		Goalie stats	Arthur Brey ( 31 saves / 33 shots )

Dartmouth won series 2–1

==== (6) Colgate vs. (11) Rensselaer ====
March 2	Colgate	3 – 1	Rensselaer	Class of 1965 Arena	Recap
(Austin, Cockrell) Trevor Cosgrove - PP - 06:14		First period	No scoring
(Brooks) Hunter Racine - GW - 10:48		Second period	00:19 - Donovan Ott (Prapavessis, Jerry)
(Meyer) Mike Panowyk - EN - 19:56		Third period	No scoring
( 26 saves / 27 shots ) Colton Point		Goalie stats	Linden Marshall ( 22 saves / 24 shots )

March 3	Colgate	0 – 1	Rensselaer	Class of 1965 Arena	Recap
No scoring		First period	12:43 - GW - Mat Harris (Reisinger, Burke)
No scoring		Second period	No scoring
No scoring		Third period	No scoring
( 25 saves / 26 shots ) Colton Point		Goalie stats	Linden Marshall ( 29 saves / 29 shots )

March 4	Colgate	2 – 1	Rensselaer	Class of 1965 Arena	Recap
No scoring		First period	No scoring
(Brooks, Panowyk) Josh McKechney - GW PP - 05:54		Second period	No scoring
(McGuire, Dauda) Evan Tschumi - 03:05		Third period	No scoring
( 23 saves / 23 shots ) Colton Point		Goalie stats	Linden Marshall ( 30 saves / 32 shots )

Colgate won series 2–1

==== (7) Princeton vs. (10) Brown ====
March 2	Princeton	8 – 2	Brown	Hobey Baker Rink	Recap
(Cressey) Josh Teves - 03:20 (Véronneau, Cressey) Ryan Kuffner - 08:00		First period	18:18 - Tommy Marchin (Lafferty)
(Keenan, Yochim) Derek Topatigh - GW - 08:16 (Teves, Véronneau) Ryan Kuffner - PP - 10:47 (Kuffner, Teves) Max Véronneau - PP - 17:34		Second period	01:37 - PP - Alec Mehr (Marchin, Lafferty)
(unassisted) Liam Grande - 11:54 (Hallisey, Kuffner) Josh Teves - PP - 16:00 (Keenan, Grande) Jake Paganelli - PP - 16:39		Third period	No scoring
( 33 saves / 35 shots ) Ryan Ferland		Goalie stats	Luke Kania ( 28 saves / 35 shots ) / Gavin Nieto ( 3 saves / 4 shots )

March 3	Princeton	7 – 1	Brown	Hobey Baker Rink	Recap
(Yochim) Jackson Cressey - 19:01		First period	No scoring
(Véronneau, Thom) Ryan Kuffner - GW - 03:37 (Robinson, Yochim) Derek Topatigh - PP - 05:03 (Paganelli, Teves) Luke Keenan - 15:32 (Kuffner, Véronneau) Alex Riche - 19:44		Second period	No scoring
(Riche, Kuffner) Max Véronneau - 12:33 (Robinson, Grabowski) Matt Nelson - PP - 19:26		Third period	08:13 - PP - Zach Giuttari (Gottlieb, Lafferty)
( 27 saves / 28 shots ) Ryan Ferland / ( 2 saves / 2 shots ) Ben Halford		Goalie stats	Luke Kania ( 37 saves / 44 shots )

Princeton won series 2–0

==== (8) Yale vs. (9) Quinnipiac ====
March 2	Yale	1 – 5	Quinnipiac	Ingalls Rink	Recap
(Welsh, Lindstrand) Ryan Hitchcock - 13:32		First period	No scoring
No scoring		Second period	02:09 - Joe O'Connor (MacMaster)
No scoring		Third period	02:41 - GW - Chase Priskie (Davidson); 08:43 - Kevin McKernan (Forchuk, Martin); 18:38 - EN - Alex Whelan (Pieper, Duane); 19:22 - Scott Davidson (unassisted)
( 27 saves / 31 shots ) Sam Tucker		Goalie stats	Keith Petruzzelli ( 21 saves / 22 shots )

March 3	Yale	1 – 4	Quinnipiac	Ingalls Rink	Recap
No Scoring		First period	No scoring
No scoring		Second period	04:41 - PP - Chase Priskie (Tufto, Furgele); 11:51 - GW - Odeen Tufto (MacMaster, Jermain)
(unassisted) Kevin O'Neil - 13:22		Third period	10:43 - Brogan Rafferty (Duane, Martin); 19:00 - EN - Alex Whelan (Rafferty)
( 26 saves / 29 shots ) Corbin Kaczperski		Goalie stats	Keith Petruzzelli ( 20 saves / 21 shots )

Quinnipiac won series 2–0

=== Quarterfinals ===
==== (1) Cornell vs. (9) Quinnipiac ====
March 9	Cornell	9 – 1	Quinnipiac	Lynah Rink	Recap
(Locke, Donaldson) Alec McCrea - PP - 01:47 (Kaldis, McCrea) Alex Rauter - GW PP - 18:08 (Fiegl, Kaldis) Jeff Malott - PP - 19:19		First period	12:57 - PP - Tanner MacMaster (Čukste, Furgele)
(Locke, Kaldis) Mitch Vanderlaan - 00:30 (Fiegl) Beau Starrett - 09:43 (Locke, Donaldson) Mitch Vanderlaan - 11:16 (Barron, Mullin) Alex Rauter - PP - 11:59 (Angello, Kaldis) Beau Starrett - 12:53 (Nuttle, Locke) Cody Haiskanen - 15:48		Second period	No scoring
		Third period
( 12 saves / 13 shots ) Matthew Galajda / ( 5 saves / 5 shots ) Hayden Stewart		Goalie stats	Keith Petruzzelli ( 18 saves / 24 shots ) / Josh Mayanja ( 5 saves / 8 shots )

March 10	Cornell	2 – 0	Quinnipiac	Lynah Rink	Recap
No scoring		First period
(Betts, Mullin) Alex Rauter - GW - 02:01		Second period
(Betts, Rauter) Mitch Vanderlaan - 08:46		Third period
( 22 saves / 22 shots ) Matthew Galajda		Goalie stats	Keith Petruzzelli ( 13 saves / 15 shots )

Cornell won series 2–0

==== (2) Union vs. (7) Princeton ====
March 9	Union	3 – 5	Princeton	Achilles Center	Recap
(Maier, Scarfo) Liam Morgan - 01:50		First period	13:30 - Max Véronneau (Nelson, Kuffner)
(Scarfo) Cole Maier - 04:16 (Harrison) Anthony Rinaldi - 18:17		Second period	01:32 - Jackson Cressey (Robinson, Topatigh)
No scoring		Third period	07:06 - PP - Ryan Kuffner (Cressey, Véronneau); 17:51 - GW - Liam Grande (Germain, Teves); 18:48 - EN - Eric Robinson (Becker, Nelson)
( 21 saves / 25 shots ) Jake Kupsky		Goalie stats	Ryan Ferland ( 24 saves / 27 shots )

March 10	Union	2 – 3	Princeton	Achilles Center	Recap
No scoring		First period	14:44 - GW - Alex Riche (Véronneau, Teves); 18:49 - SH - Eric Robinson (Grabowski)
(Campbell, Kupsky) Anthony Rinaldi - PP - 07:53 (Scarfo, Morgan) Ryan Walker - 09:07		Second period	No scoring
No scoring		Third period	19:50 - David Hallisey (Teves, Robinson)
( 19 saves / 22 shots ) Jake Kupsky		Goalie stats	Ryan Ferland ( 29 saves / 31 shots )

Princeton won series 2–0

==== (3) Clarkson vs. (6) Colgate ====
March 9	Clarkson	1 – 2	Colgate	Cheel Arena	Recap
No scoring		First period	No scoring
		Second period	14:04 - PP - Adam Dauda (Cosgrove, McMann); 17:54 - GW - Jared Cockrell (Jeanson, Brooks)
(Thow, Gervais) Marly Quince - 09:51		Third period
( 12 saves / 14 shots ) Jake Kielly		Goalie stats	Colton Point ( 31 saves / 32 shots )

March 10	Clarkson	3 – 0	Colgate	Cheel Arena	Recap
(Dickinson, Astrén) Haralds Egle - GW PP - 11:56		First period	No scoring
		Second period	No scoring
(Rempal, Sturm) Devin Brosseau - PP EN - 00:24 (Jokiharju) Marly Quince - 00:57		Third period	No scoring
( 19 saves / 19 shots ) Jake Kielly		Goalie stats	Colton Point ( 31 saves / 34 shots )

March 11	Clarkson	5 – 1	Colgate	Cheel Arena	Recap
(Jacome, Rempal) Nic Pierog - 13:14 (Charyszyn, Thow) Jack Jacome - GW - 16:56		First period	No Scoring
(Sturm, Rempal) Terrance Amorosa - PP - 02:45 (Sturm, Summers) Sheldon Rempal - PP - 12:28 (Pierog, Gareau) Tyko Karjalainen - PP - 16:44		Second period	16:26 - Adam Dauda (Racine, McMann)
No scoring		Third period	No scoring
( 32 saves / 33 shots ) Jake Kielly		Goalie stats	Colton Point ( 24 saves / 29 shots )

Clarkson won series 2–1

==== (4) Harvard vs. (5) Dartmouth ====
March 9	Harvard	1 – 4	Dartmouth	Bright-Landry Hockey Center	Recap
No scoring		First period	04:14 - Cam Strong (Rutherford, Blankemeier); 08:58 - GW - Daniel Warpecha (Kilistoff, Michalowski)
		Second period	10:35 - Matt Baker (Jasiek, Kalk)
(Horton, Donato) Nathan Krusko - 05:13		Third period	16:24 - EN - Corey Kalk (Jasiek, Less)
( 17 saves / 20 shots ) Merrick Madsen		Goalie stats	Devin Buffalo ( 34 saves / 35 shots )

March 10	Harvard	7 – 1	Dartmouth	Bright-Landry Hockey Center	Recap
(Fox, Walsh) Lewis Zerter-Gossage - PP - 09:29 (Floodstrand, Horton) Benjamin Solin - GW - 09:53		First period	No scoring
(Pelton-Byce, Donato) Nathan Krusko - 08:18 (Ellis, Marino) Adam Fox - 09:23 (Krusko, Donato) Adam Fox - 15:42 (Fox, Marino) Ryan Donato - PP - 19:56		Second period	09:30 - Corey Kalk (Jasiek)
(Donato, Olson) Ty Pelton-Byce - 13:08		Third period	No scoring
( 21 saves / 22 shots ) Merrick Madsen		Goalie stats	Devin Buffalo ( 23 saves / 29 shots ) / Adrian Clark ( 3 saves / 4 shots )

March 11	Harvard	4 – 2	Dartmouth	Bright-Landry Hockey Center	Recap
(Fox, Walsh) Ryan Donato - PP - 11:41		First period	04:43 - Collin Rutherford (Kalk, Baker)
(Pelton-Byce, Donato) Ryan Donato - 08:18		Second period	No scoring
(Solin, Floodstrand) Adam Fox - GW - 13:08 (Marino) Ryan Donato - 13:16		Third period	16:17 - Quin Foreman (Rutherford, Graber)
( 20 saves / 22 shots ) Merrick Madsen		Goalie stats	Devin Buffalo ( 25 saves / 29 shots )

Harvard won series 2–1

=== Semifinals ===
==== (1) Cornell vs. (7) Princeton ====
March 16	Cornell	1 – 4	Princeton	Herb Brooks Arena	Recap
(Donaldson) Trevor Yates - 15:38		First period	No Scoring
No scoring		Second period	08:51 - Liam Grande (Teves); 14:04 - GW - Eric Robinson (Keenan)
No scoring		Third period	10:17 - Max Véronneau (Kuffner, Thom); 19:26 - EN - Eric Robinson (unassisted)
( 14 saves / 17 shots ) Matthew Galajda		Goalie stats	Ryan Ferland ( 27 saves / 28 shots )

==== (3) Clarkson vs. (4) Harvard ====
March 16	Clarkson	5 – 4	OT	Harvard	Herb Brooks Arena	Recap
No scoring		First period		11:37 - PP - Reilly Walsh (Pelton-Byce, Donato)
(Egle) Jack Jacome - PP - 13:57 (Eden, Thompson) Eric Sweetman - PP - 17:23		Second period		05:47 - PP - Lewis Zerter-Gossage (Walsh, Fox); 07:58 - Ty Pelton-Byce (Donato, Krusko)
(Egle, Summers) Nic Pierog - 00:15 (Rempal) Devin Brosseau - 01:11 (Egle) Dylan Gareau - 04:02		Third period		00:06 - Ty Pelton-Byce (unassisted)
(Sturm, Brosseau) Sheldon Rempal - 00:15		First overtime period		No scoring
( 29 saves / 33 shots ) Jake Kielly		Goalie stats		Merrick Madsen ( 31 saves / 36 shots )

=== Championship ===
==== (3) Clarkson vs. (7) Princeton ====
March 21	Clarkson	1 – 2	OT	Princeton	Herb Brooks Arena	Recap
No Scoring		First period		16:43 - Josh Teves (Kuffner, Véronneau)
No scoring		Second period		No scoring
(Amorosa, Rempal) Josh Dickinson - 12:17		Third period		No scoring
No scoring		First overtime period		02:37 - GW - Max Becker (Germain, Grande)
( 21 saves / 23 shots ) Jake Kielly		Goalie stats		Ryan Ferland ( 31 saves / 32 shots )

== Tournament awards ==
=== All-Tournament Team ===
- F Eric Robinson (Princeton)
- F Max Becker (Princeton)
- F Sheldon Rempal (Clarkson)
- D Kelly Summers (Clarkson)
- D Josh Teves (Princeton)
- G Ryan Ferland* (Princeton)

* Most Outstanding Player(s)
