= 2017–18 Yale Bulldogs men's ice hockey season =

College ice hockey season

- Conference: 8th ECAC Hockey
- Home ice: Ingalls Rink

Rankings
- USCHO: NR
- USA Today: NR

Record
- Overall: 15–15–1
- Conference: 10–11–1
- Home: 9–7–1
- Road: 5–7–0
- Neutral: 1–1–0

Coaches and captains
- Head coach: Keith Allain
- Assistant coaches: Josh Siembida; Ryan Donald
- Captain: Ryan Hitchcock

The 2017–18 Yale Bulldogs Men's ice hockey season was the 123rd season of play for the program and the 57th season in the ECAC Hockey conference. The Bulldogs represented Yale University and were coached by Keith Allain, in his 12th season.

== Season ==
Yale played up and down all season long, hovering around the .500 mark. Redshirt sophomore Corbin Kaczperski got some playing time in goal at the end of Yale's 5-game losing streak and the team began to rotate their goaltenders thereafter. The team showed modest improvement as the season went along and entered the conference tournament with a home date in the first round. Unfortunately, the team faltered against Quinnipiac and lost both of their postseason games.

== Departures ==
Player	Position	Nationality	Cause
Frank DiChiara	Forward	United States	Graduation (signed with Worcester Railers)
Michael Doherty	Forward	United States	Graduation (signed with Manchester Monarchs)
Henry Hart	Forward	United States	Did Not Play (Retired)
John Hayden	Forward	United States	Graduation (signed with Chicago Blackhawks)
Chris Izmirlian	Forward	Canada	Graduation (signed with Knoxville Ice Bears)
Dan O'Keefe	Defenseman	United States	Graduation (Retired)
Patrick Spano	Goaltender	Canada	Graduation (signed with Knoxville Ice Bears)

== Recruiting ==
Player	Position	Nationality	Age
Brett Jewell	Forward	Canada	20
Phil Kemp	Defenseman	United States	18
Nicholas MacNab	Goaltender	United States	21
Brian Matthews	Defenseman	United States	19
Kevin O'Neil	Forward	United States	19
Dante Palecco	Forward	United States	19
Tyler Welsh	Forward	Canada	20

== Roster ==
No.	Nat.	Player	Class	Pos	Height	Weight	DoB	Hometown	Previous team	NHL rights
1	(United States)	Sam Tucker	Junior	G	6' 2" (1.88 m)	180 lb (82 kg)	1996-04-16	Wilton, Connecticut	Choate Rosemary Hall (US-Prep)	—
2	(United States)	Adam Larkin	Senior	D	6' 0" (1.83 m)	190 lb (86 kg)	1995-01-28	Clarkston, Michigan	Muskegon Lumberjacks (USHL)	—
3	(United States)	Charlie Curti	Junior	D	6' 0" (1.83 m)	192 lb (87 kg)	1996-05-04	Mound, Minnesota	Cedar Rapids RoughRiders (USHL)	—
4	(United States)	Matt Foley	Sophomore	D	6' 1" (1.85 m)	198 lb (90 kg)	1995-04-20	Longmeadow, Massachusetts	Bloomington Thunder (USHL)	—
5	(United States)	Brian Matthews	Freshman	D	6' 0" (1.83 m)	195 lb (88 kg)	1998-04-21	Marshfield, Massachusetts	Omaha Lancers (USHL)	—
6	(United States)	Billy Sweezey	Sophomore	D	6' 2" (1.88 m)	204 lb (93 kg)	1996-02-06	Hanson, Massachusetts	Chicago Steel (USHL)	—
7	(United States)	Joe Snively	Junior	C	5' 9" (1.75 m)	165 lb (75 kg)	1996-01-01	Herndon, Virginia	Sioux City Musketeers (USHL)	—
8	(United States)	Will D'Orsi	Sophomore	F	5' 11" (1.8 m)	180 lb (82 kg)	1997-01-07	Sudbury, Massachusetts	Lincoln Stars (USHL)	—
9	(Canada)	Robbie DeMontis	Sophomore	F	5' 9" (1.75 m)	170 lb (77 kg)	1996-02-17	Kleinburg, Ontario	Muskegon Lumberjacks (USHL)	—
10	(United States)	Chandler Lindstrand	Sophomore	D	6' 0" (1.83 m)	195 lb (88 kg)	1996-02-21	Medina, Minnesota	Des Moines Buccaneers (USHL)	—
11	(United States)	Andrew Gaus	Junior (RS)	F	6' 0" (1.83 m)	185 lb (84 kg)	1995-02-23	Wexford, Pennsylvania	Cedar Rapids RoughRiders (USHL)	—
12	(United States)	Dante Palecco	Freshman	F	5' 11" (1.8 m)	185 lb (84 kg)	1998-04-18	Whippany, New Jersey	Green Bay Gamblers (USHL)	—
13	(Canada)	Evan Smith	Sophomore	F	6' 0" (1.83 m)	190 lb (86 kg)	1996-08-28	Stouffville, Ontario	Dubuque Fighting Saints (USHL)	—
14	(Canada)	Mitchell Smith	Sophomore	F	5' 11" (1.8 m)	185 lb (84 kg)	1996-08-28	Stouffville, Ontario	Dubuque Fighting Saints (USHL)	—
16	(United States)	Anthony Walsh	Junior	D	5' 10" (1.78 m)	180 lb (82 kg)	1999-12-30	Burr Ridge, Illinois	Sioux City Musketeers (USHL)	—
17	(United States)	Kevin O'Neil	Freshman	F	5' 11" (1.8 m)	175 lb (79 kg)	1998-02-23	Latham, New York	Madison Capitols (USHL)	—
19	(United States)	Ted Hart	Junior	F	6' 1" (1.85 m)	185 lb (84 kg)	1996-02-20	Cumberland, Maine	Phillips Exeter Academy (US-Prep)	—
20	(United States)	John Baiocco	Senior	F	5' 8" (1.73 m)	174 lb (79 kg)	1995-06-06	Harding, New Jersey	Dubuque Fighting Saints (USHL)	—
21	(Canada)	Tyler Welsh	Freshman	F	5' 9" (1.75 m)	165 lb (75 kg)	1997-03-17	Whistler, British Columbia	Victoria Grizzlies (BCHL)	—
22	(United States)	J. M. Piotrowski	Junior	F	6' 2" (1.88 m)	194 lb (88 kg)	1995-05-01	Dallas, Texas	Sioux Falls Stampede (USHL)	—
25	(United States)	Phil Kemp	Freshman	D	6' 3" (1.91 m)	200 lb (91 kg)	1999-02-12	Greenwich, Connecticut	USNTDP (USHL)	EDM, 208th overall 2017
26	(Canada)	Brett Jewell	Freshman	F	6' 2" (1.88 m)	195 lb (88 kg)	1996-11-09	Vernon, British Columbia	Merritt Centennials (BCHL)	—
27	(United States)	Luke Stevens	Sophomore	F	6' 4" (1.93 m)	212 lb (96 kg)	1997-02-11	Duxbury, Massachusetts	Noble & Greenough School (USHS–MA)	CAR, 126th overall 2015
28	(United States)	Ryan Hitchcock (C)	Senior	F	5' 10" (1.78 m)	176 lb (80 kg)	1996-03-30	Manhasset, New York	USNTDP (USHL)	—
33	(United States)	Corbin Kaczperski	Sophomore (RS)	G	6' 3" (1.91 m)	185 lb (84 kg)	1996-03-02	China Township, Michigan	Lone Star Brahmas (NAHL)	—

== Standings ==
2017–18 ECAC Hockey men's standings
	Conference record							Overall record					
	GP	W	L	T	PTS	GF	GA	GP	W	L	T	GF	GA
#8 Cornell†	22	17	3	2	36	61	32	33	25	6	2	102	52
Union	22	16	5	1	33	70	48	38	21	15	2	115	98
#12 Clarkson	22	12	5	5	29	74	49	40	23	11	6	122	75
Harvard	22	11	8	3	25	68	50	33	15	14	4	104	85
Dartmouth	22	11	10	1	23	55	69	35	16	17	2	83	107
Colgate	22	10	9	3	23	49	46	40	17	17	6	87	88
#15 Princeton*	22	10	10	2	22	77	79	36	19	13	4	131	110
Yale	22	10	11	1	21	67	59	31	15	15	1	87	88
Quinnipiac	22	9	11	2	20	59	56	38	16	18	4	105	106
Brown	22	7	14	1	15	45	63	31	8	19	4	67	104
Rensselaer	22	4	16	2	10	45	86	37	6	27	4	73	129
St. Lawrence	22	3	18	1	7	43	76	37	8	27	2	80	122
Championship: March 17, 2018 † indicates conference regular season champion (Cleary Cup) * indicates conference tournament champion (Whitelaw Cup); Rankings: USCHO.com Top 20 Poll; updated February 26, 2018

== Schedule and results ==
Date	Time	Opponent^{#}	Rank^{#}	Site	TV	Decision	Result	Attendance	Record
Exhibition
October 13	7:00 PM	vs. Western Ontario*		Ingalls Rink • New Haven, Connecticut (Exhibition)		MacNab	W 6–4	1,286	
Regular season
October 27	7:00 PM	vs. Brown		Ingalls Rink • New Haven, Connecticut		Tucker	L 1–4	2,588	0–1–0 (0–1–0)
October 28	7:00 PM	vs. Brown		Meehan Auditorium • Providence, Rhode Island		Tucker	W 5–2	553	1–1–0 (1–1–0)
November 3	7:00 PM	at #3 Harvard		Bright-Landry Hockey Center • Boston, Massachusetts		Tucker	W 5–2	2,774	2–1–0 (2–1–0)
November 4	7:00 PM	at Dartmouth		Thompson Arena • Hanover, New Hampshire		Tucker	L 1–3	2,421	2–2–0 (2–2–0)
November 10	7:00 PM	vs. St. Lawrence		Ingalls Rink • New Haven, Connecticut		Tucker	W 6–1	3,031	3–2–0 (3–2–0)
November 11	7:00 PM	vs. #11 Clarkson		Ingalls Rink • New Haven, Connecticut		Tucker	L 1–4	3,189	3–3–0 (3–3–0)
November 17	7:00 PM	at Princeton		Hobey Baker Memorial Rink • Princeton, New Jersey		Tucker	L 4–5	1,948	3–4–0 (3–4–0)
November 18	7:00 PM	at Quinnipiac		TD Bank Sports Center • Hamden, Connecticut		Tucker	L 0–3	3,625	3–5–0 (3–5–0)
November 25	7:00 PM	vs. #13 New Hampshire*		Ingalls Rink • New Haven, Connecticut		Tucker	L 0–4	3,349	3–6–0
December 1	7:00 PM	at Rensselaer		Houston Field House • Troy, New York		Kaczperski	L 1–2	2,831	3–7–0 (3–6–0)
December 2	7:00 PM	at #19 Union		Achilles Rink • Schenectady, New York		Tucker	W 5–3	1,919	4–7–0 (4–6–0)
December 9	7:00 PM	vs. Sacred Heart		Webster Bank Arena • Bridgeport, Connecticut		Tucker	W 2–1	507	5–7–0
Ledyard Bank Classic
December 29	4:05 PM	vs. #17 Minnesota–Duluth*		Thompson Arena • Hanover, New Hampshire (Ledyard Bank Game 1)		Tucker	L 0–5	3,376	5–8–0
December 30	4:05 PM	vs. #16 New Hampshire*		Thompson Arena • Hanover, New Hampshire (Ledyard Bank Game 2)		Kaczperski	W 4–2	—	6–8–0
January 5	7:00 PM	vs. Massachusetts*		Ingalls Rink • New Haven, Connecticut		Kaczperski	W 5–3	2,632	7–8–0
January 12	7:00 PM	vs. #4 Cornell		Ingalls Rink • New Haven, Connecticut		Tucker	T 3–3 ^{OT}	3,500	7–8–1 (4–6–1)
January 13	7:00 PM	vs. #19 Colgate		Ingalls Rink • New Haven, Connecticut		Kaczperski	W 5–1	3,235	8–8–1 (5–6–1)
January 19	7:00 PM	vs. Union		Ingalls Rink • New Haven, Connecticut		Tucker	L 2–3	3,500	8–9–1 (5–7–1)
January 19	7:00 PM	vs. Rensselaer		Ingalls Rink • New Haven, Connecticut		Kaczperski	W 5–1	3,500	9–9–1 (6–7–1)
January 26	7:00 PM	at #3 Clarkson		Cheel Arena • Potsdam, New York		Tucker	L 1–4	2,873	9–10–1 (6–8–1)
January 27	7:00 PM	at St. Lawrence		Appleton Arena • Canton, New York		Kaczperski	L 0–1	1,581	9–11–1 (6–9–1)
February 2	7:00 PM	vs. Arizona State*		Ingalls Rink • New Haven, Connecticut		Tucker	W 3–2 ^{OT}	2,939	10–11–1
February 3	7:00 PM	vs. Arizona State*		Ingalls Rink • New Haven, Connecticut		Kaczperski	W 4–3 ^{OT}	3,219	11–11–1
February 9	7:00 PM	at Quinnipiac		Ingalls Rink • New Haven, Connecticut		Tucker	W 3–2	3,500	12–11–1 (7–9–1)
February 10	7:00 PM	vs. Princeton		Ingalls Rink • New Haven, Connecticut		Kaczperski	W 7–2	3,500	13–11–1 (8–9–1)
February 16	7:05 PM	at Colgate		Class of 1965 Arena • Hamilton, New York		Tucker	W 4–3	1,006	14–11–1 (9–9–1)
February 17	7:03 PM	at #4 Cornell		Lynah Rink • Ithaca, New York		Kaczperski	L 2–3	4,267	14–12–1 (9–10–1)
February 23	7:00 PM	vs. Dartmouth		Ingalls Rink • New Haven, Connecticut		Tucker	L 4–6	3,500	14–13–1 (9–11–1)
February 24	7:00 PM	vs. Harvard		Ingalls Rink • New Haven, Connecticut		Kaczperski	W 2–1	3,500	15–13–1 (10–11–1)
ECAC Hockey Tournament
March 2	7:00 PM	vs. Quinnipiac*		Ingalls Rink • New Haven, Connecticut (First Round Game 1)		Tucker	L 1–5	2,672	15–14–1
March 3	7:00 PM	vs. Quinnipiac*		Ingalls Rink • New Haven, Connecticut (First Round Game 2)		Kaczperski	L 1–4	3,224	15–15–1
Yale Lost Series 0–2
*Non-conference game. ^{#}Rankings from USCHO.com Poll. All times are in Eastern Time.

== Scoring statistics ==
Name	Position	Games	Goals	Assists	Points	PIM
Joe Snivley	LW	31	19	17	36	18
Ryan Hitchcock	C/LW	31	7	13	20	6
Evan Smith	C/LW	31	10	7	17	60
Ted Heart	C/RW	31	8	6	14	26
Dante Palecco	LW	30	7	6	13	4
Robbie DeMontis	LW	31	6	7	13	20
Kevin O'Neil	RW	31	7	4	11	14
Luke Stevens	LW	30	6	5	11	12
Charlie Curti	D	25	3	8	11	8
Billy Sweezey	D	30	1	9	10	46
Mitchell Smith	LW	30	3	6	9	16
Phil Kemp	D	26	3	5	8	8
Anthony Walsh	D/F	31	1	7	8	28
Adam Larkin	D	31	1	6	7	10
J. M. Piotrowski	F	27	2	3	5	16
Tyler Welsh	F	28	0	5	5	8
Matt Foley	D	16	0	4	4	22
Will D'Orsi	C	12	1	1	2	0
Brett Jewell	RW	24	1	1	2	13
Andrew Gaus	RW	4	0	2	2	0
Corbin Kaczperski	G	12	0	2	2	0
Chandler Lindstrand	D	21	0	2	2	10
Brian Matthews	D	6	1	0	1	4
John Baiocco	F	1	0	0	0	0
Sam Tucker	G	20	0	0	0	0
Bench	-	31	-	-	-	6
Total			87	126	213	355

== Goaltending statistics ==
Name	Games	Minutes	Wins	Losses	Ties	Goals against	Saves	Shut outs	SV %	GAA
Corbin Kaczperski	12	684	7	4	0	23	318	0	.933	2.02
Sam Tucker	20	1169	8	11	1	60	501	0	.893	3.08
Empty Net	-	16	-	-	-	5	-	-	-	-
Total	31	1870	15	15	1	88	819	0	.903	2.82

== Rankings ==
Poll	Week																								
Poll	Pre	1	2	3	4	5	6	7	8	9	10	11	12	13	14	15	16	17	18	19	20	21	22	23	24 (Final)
USCHO.com	NR	–	NR	NR	NR	NR	NR	NR	NR	NR	NR	NR	NR	NR	NR	NR	NR	NR	NR	NR	NR	NR	NR	NR	NR
USA Today	NR	NR	NR	NR	NR	NR	NR	NR	NR	NR	NR	NR	NR	NR	NR	NR	NR	NR	NR	NR	NR	NR	NR	NR	NR

*USCHO did not release a poll in week 1.

== Awards and honors ==
=== ECAC hockey ===
Honor	Player	Position	Ref
All-ECAC Hockey Second Team	Joe Snivley	Forward	

== Players drafted into the NHL ==
=== 2018 NHL entry draft ===
Round	Pick	Player	NHL team
4	112	Jack St. Ivany†	Philadelphia Flyers
4	119	Curtis Hall†	Boston Bruins

† incoming freshman
