= Ben Hanowski =

American ice hockey player

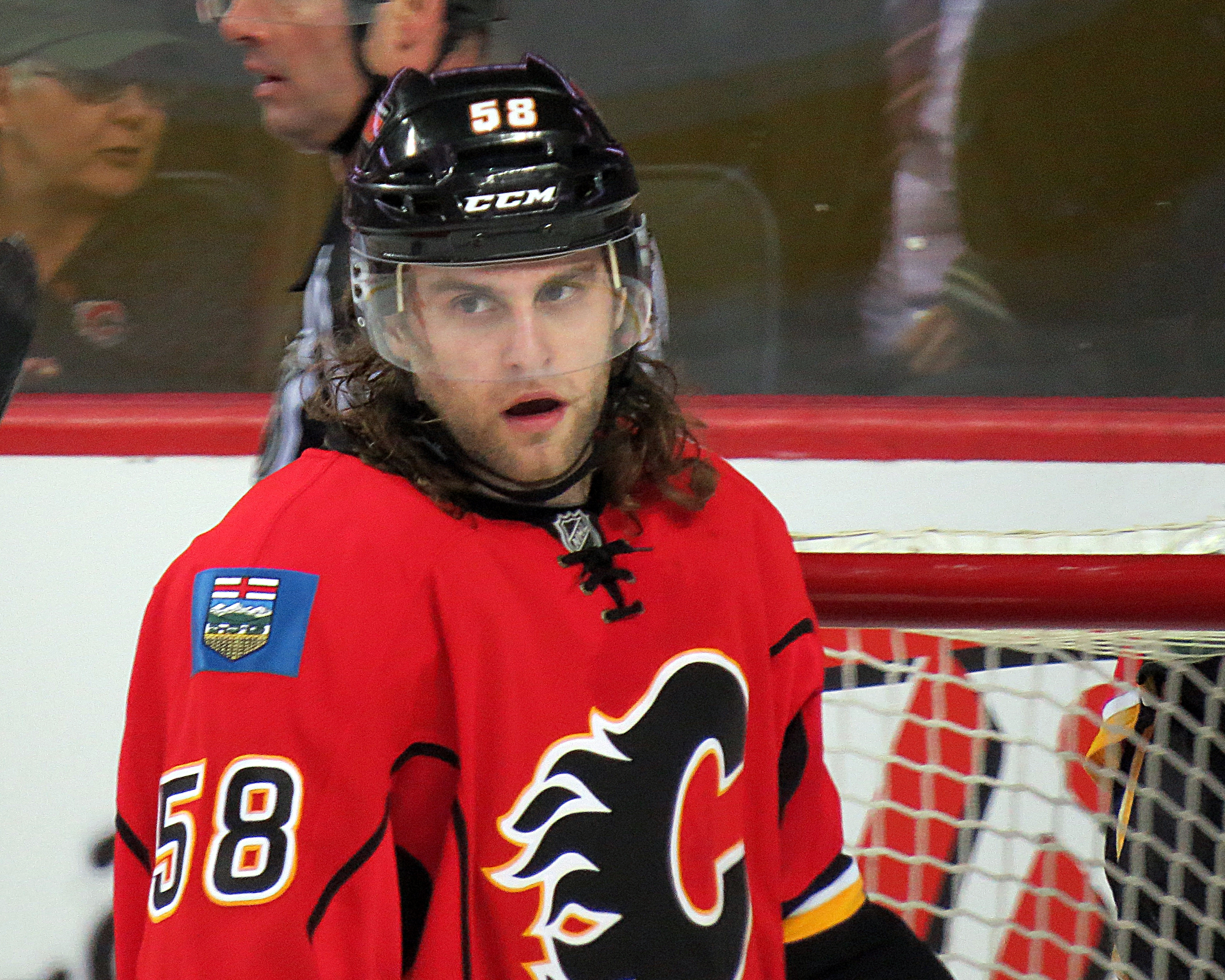
- Born: October 18, 1990 (age 35) Little Falls, Minnesota, U.S.
- Height: 6 ft 2 in (188 cm)
- Weight: 195 lb (88 kg; 13 st 13 lb)
- Position: Right wing
- Shot: Left
- Played for: Calgary Flames; Augsburger Panther; Kölner Haie
- NHL draft: 63rd overall, 2009; Pittsburgh Penguins
- Playing career: 2013–2020

Benjamin Robert Hanowski (born October 18, 1990) is an American former professional ice hockey player. An alumnus of the St. Cloud State Huskies, he was a third-round selection of the Pittsburgh Penguins, 63rd overall, at the 2009 NHL entry draft. Hanowski was dealt to the Calgary Flames before turning professional as part of the trade that sent Jarome Iginla to Pittsburgh. He made his NHL debut late in the 2012–13 season, scoring his first goal in his first game.

== Early life ==
Hanowski grew up in Little Falls, Minnesota, where he played both baseball and ice hockey for Little Falls High School, graduating in 2009. He is the all-time leading scorer in Minnesota High School ice hockey history, recording 405 points in 117 games. He was a finalist for the Minnesota Mr. Hockey award, and named Minnesota Player of the Year by the Associated Press in 2008–09 following a season in which he scored 73 goals and 62 assists in 31 games. He was selected by the Pittsburgh Penguins in the third round of the 2009 NHL entry draft, 63rd overall. Before embarking on a professional career, Hanowksi attended St. Cloud State University first as a business major before switching to finance.

== Playing career ==
=== College ===
Hanowski played four years for the St. Cloud State Huskies (SCSU), completing his college career with 62 goals and 51 assists for 113 points in 156 games. He was named the Western Collegiate Hockey Association (WCHA) scholar-athlete in 2012, and was named to the all-WCHA Academic team twice. He began his college career in 2009–10, scoring his first two goals on October 23, 2009, against the Minnesota-Duluth Bulldogs en route to a 19-point season.

Following a sophomore season in which he scored 20 points, Hanowski was named one of three captains for the 2011–12 campaign. He led the team with 128 shots, 23 goals and 43 points. Hanowski returned for his senior season in 2012–13 as co-captain with Drew LeBlanc, finishing the year with 37 points in 31 games and a semifinal appearance in the 2013 national championship.

=== Professional ===
Hanowski's NHL rights were traded late in his senior season as the Penguins dealt him to the Calgary Flames along with Kenny Agostino and a first round draft pick in exchange for Calgary captain Jarome Iginla. Hanowski struggled to explain his place in the blockbuster deal: "I don't know how to describe it, being part of a trade for a future Hall of Famer. It was kind of weird to see yourself be part of that deal". Immediately following SCSU's elimination from the 2013 Frozen Four and the conclusion of his college season, Hanowski signed a two-year entry-level contract with the Flames worth $810,000 per season. He made his NHL debut on April 15, 2013, in Calgary against his hometown Minnesota Wild, and scored his first goal in a 4–3 loss.

As a free agent from the Flames and with little interest from fellow NHL organizations, Hanowski signed a one-year contract with the German club, Augsburger Panther of the Deutsche Eishockey Liga (DEL) on September 7, 2015. He eventually stayed until the end of the 2016–17 season and then headed to fellow DEL outfit, Kölner Haie, putting pen to paper on a one-year deal in April 2017.

== Career statistics ==
			Regular season					Playoffs
Season	Team	League	GP	G	A	Pts	PIM	GP	G	A	Pts	PIM
2005–06	Little Falls High	USHS	31	35	29	64	10	—	—	—	—	—
2006–07	Little Falls High	USHS	29	40	71	111	18	—	—	—	—	—
2007–08	Little Falls High	USHS	26	48	47	95	20	—	—	—	—	—
2008–09	Little Falls High	USHS	31	73	62	135	16	—	—	—	—	—
2009–10	St. Cloud State Huskies	WCHA	43	9	10	19	19	—	—	—	—	—
2010–11	St. Cloud State Huskies	WCHA	37	13	7	20	18	—	—	—	—	—
2011–12	St. Cloud State Huskies	WCHA	39	23	20	43	25	—	—	—	—	—
2012–13	St. Cloud State Huskies	WCHA	37	17	14	31	18	—	—	—	—	—
2012–13	Calgary Flames	NHL	5	1	0	1	0	—	—	—	—	—
2013–14	Abbotsford Heat	AHL	55	13	18	31	18	4	0	1	1	2
2013–14	Calgary Flames	NHL	11	0	2	2	2	—	—	—	—	—
2014–15	Adirondack Flames	AHL	56	16	9	25	21	—	—	—	—	—
2015–16	Augsburger Panther	DEL	52	20	22	42	45	—	—	—	—	—
2016–17	Augsburger Panther	DEL	52	21	13	34	10	7	3	2	5	14
2017–18	Kölner Haie	DEL	52	18	21	39	10	6	1	3	4	0
2018–19	Kölner Haie	DEL	31	10	10	20	6	11	1	1	2	6
2019–20	Kölner Haie	DEL	52	12	13	25	20	—	—	—	—	—
NHL totals			16	1	2	3	2	—	—	—	—	—
