= Kenny Agostino =

American ice hockey player (born 1992)

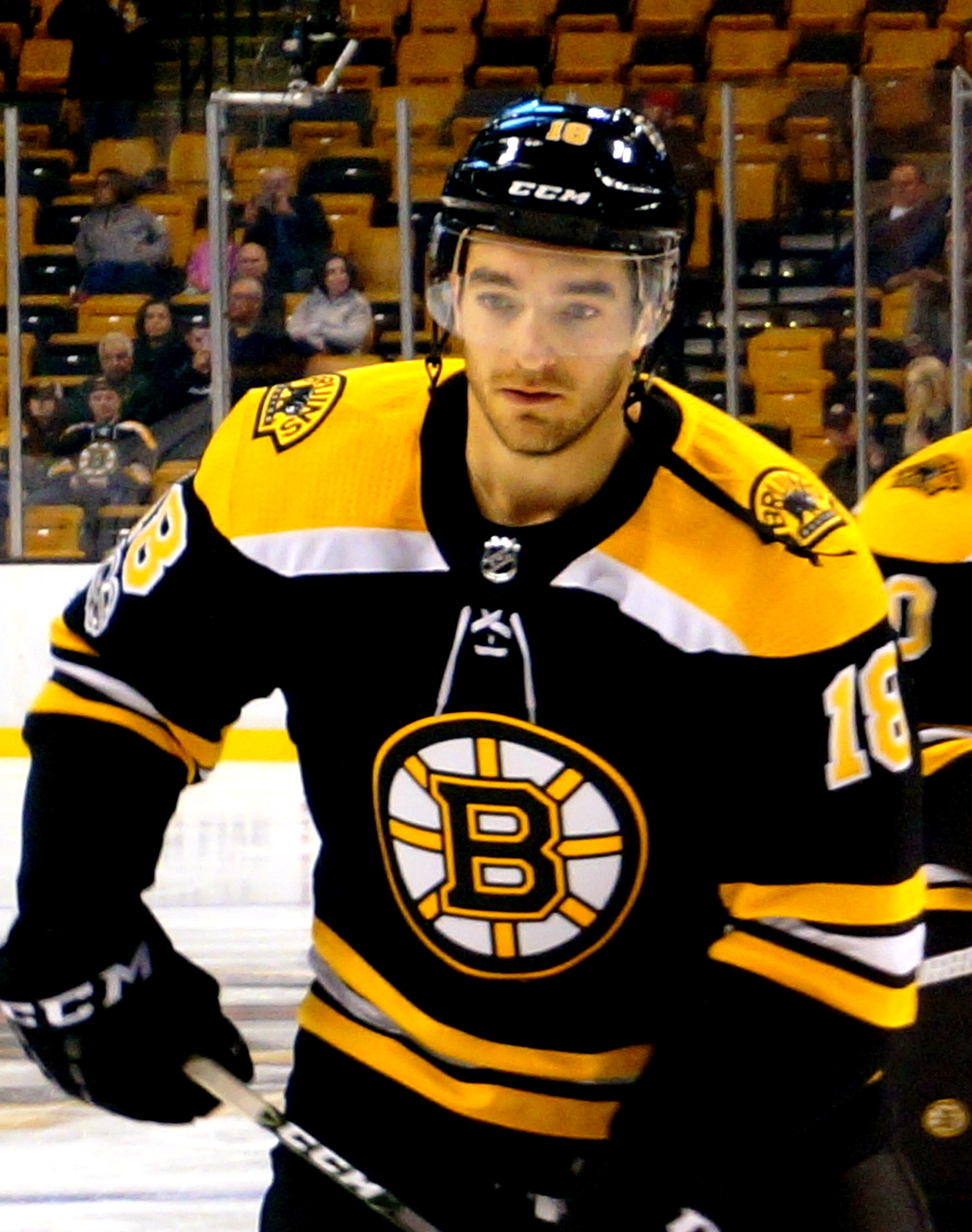
- Kenny Agostino at Boston Bruins warm-ups October 2017
- Born: April 30, 1992 (age 34) Morristown, New Jersey, U.S.
- Height: 6 ft 0 in (183 cm)
- Weight: 200 lb (91 kg; 14 st 4 lb)
- Position: Left wing
- Shoots: Left
- DEL team Former teams: ERC Ingolstadt; Calgary Flames; St. Louis Blues; Boston Bruins; Montreal Canadiens; New Jersey Devils; Toronto Maple Leafs; Torpedo Nizhny Novgorod; Düsseldorfer EG
- National team: United States
- NHL draft: 140th overall, 2010; Pittsburgh Penguins
- Playing career: 2014–present

Kenneth Tyler Agostino (born April 30, 1992) is an American professional ice hockey forward who currently plays for ERC Ingolstadt of the Deutsche Eishockey Liga (DEL). He was a fifth-round selection, 140th overall, of the Pittsburgh Penguins at the 2010 NHL entry draft and was acquired by the Calgary Flames in the Jarome Iginla trade. Agostino played four seasons of college hockey for the Yale Bulldogs and was a member of the school's 2013 national championship winning team.

== Playing career ==
=== Youth and college hockey ===
Agostino is a native of the Flanders, New Jersey section of Mount Olive Township, New Jersey. As a youth, he played in the 2005 Quebec International Pee-Wee Hockey Tournament with the New Jersey Devils minor ice hockey team.

Agostino played high school hockey for Delbarton School where he graduated as the school's all-time leading scorer with 261 points. He was named New Jersey High School Player of the Year by the Newark Star-Ledger in 2009 and 2010 and recorded 50 goals and 83 points in his senior year of 2009–10. The Pittsburgh Penguins selected Agostino with their fifth-round pick, 140th overall, at the 2010 NHL entry draft.

Agostino committed to play college hockey for the Yale Bulldogs, and on January 2, 2011, became only the third freshman in school history to record a hat-trick; he added two assists to his three goals in the game to tie a school record with five points by a freshman in a 10–3 victory over the Holy Cross Crusaders. After finishing with 25 points in 2010–11, Agostino improved to 34 points in his sophomore season of 2011–12. As a junior, he was Yale's leading scorer with 41 points in 37 games. As he prepared for the 2013 Frozen Four national championship tournament, the Penguins traded Agostino's NHL rights. Pittsburgh also sent Ben Hanowski and a first-round draft pick to the Calgary Flames in exchange for Jarome Iginla on March 27, 2013.

Yale reached the championship game and defeated Quinnipiac 4–0 to win the first NCAA team championship of any sport in the school's history. Agostino considered turning professional following the win but opted to return for his senior season with the Bulldogs. He completed his final season, 2013–14, with 32 points in 32 games. Over his four-year college career, Agostino recorded 132 points in 134 games.

Agostino turned professional at the conclusion of Yale's 2013–14 season and signed a two-year contract with the Flames worth $900,000 per season.

=== NHL and AHL ===
Agostino made his NHL debut on March 21, 2014, in a 6–5 loss to the Nashville Predators. His first goal came on April 4, against goaltender Roberto Luongo in a 2–1 victory over the Florida Panthers.

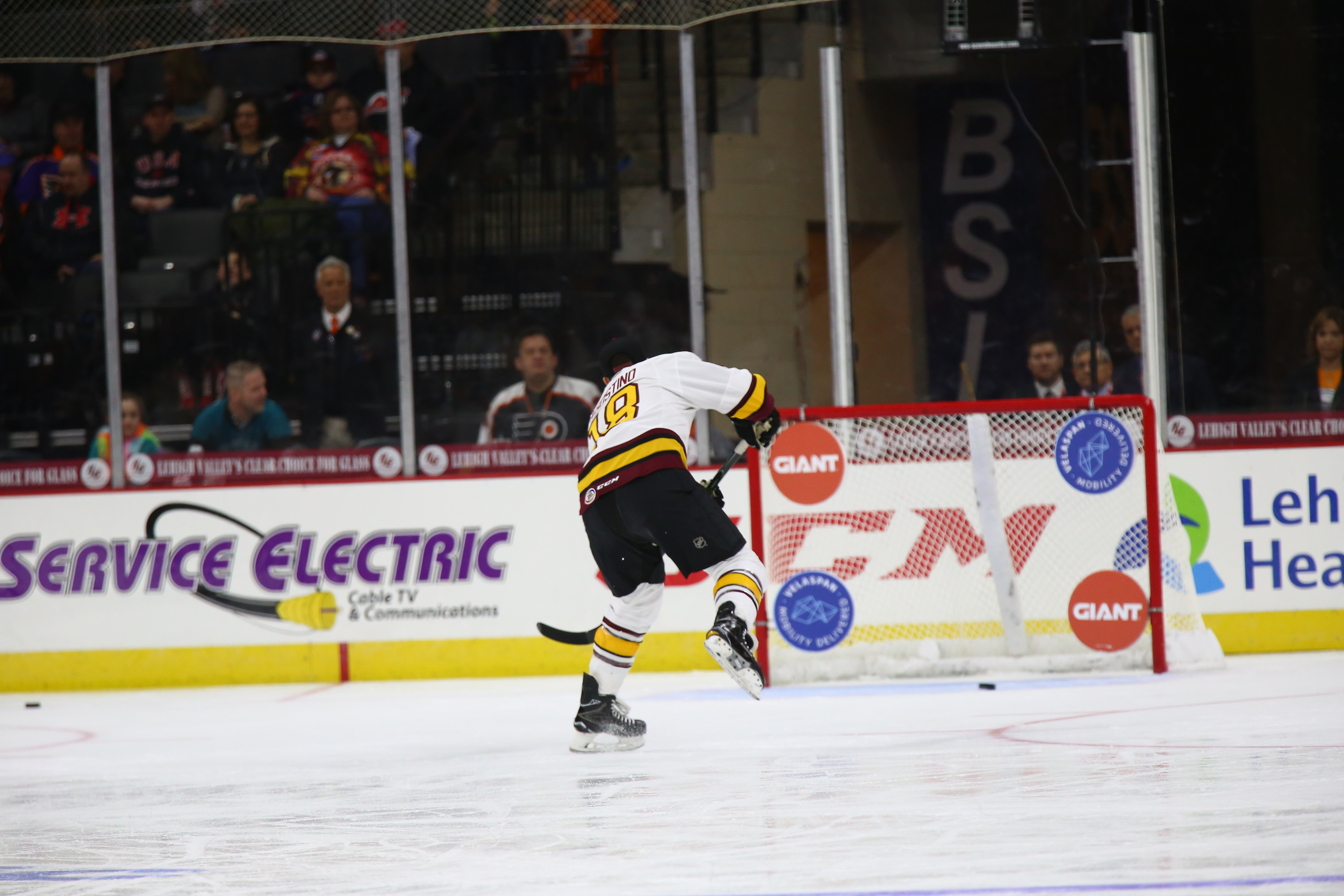
Agostino at the AHL All-Star skills competition in 2017

On July 2, 2016, Agostino, having left the Flames organization after not being tendered a qualifying offer, signed a one-year, two-way contract as a free agent with the St. Louis Blues. Assigned to the Blues' AHL affiliate, the Chicago Wolves, Agostino was named the American Hockey League MVP in the 2016–17 season after posting 24 goals while leading the league with 59 assists and 83 points in 65 games with the Wolves.

On the first day of the 2017 free agency window on July 1, Agostino signed a one-year, one-way $850,000 deal with the Boston Bruins.

Unable to break in with the Bruins, Agostino left as a free agent in the off-season to sign a one-year, two-way $700,000 contract with the Montreal Canadiens on July 1, 2018. Agostino began the 2018–19 season in the AHL with affiliate, the Laval Rocket. On November 7, 2018, Agostino was recalled by the Canadiens after injuries to regulars Joel Armia and Paul Byron. At the time, he was the lead scorer of the Rocket, with 4 goals and 10 points. He eclipsed his previous stints in the NHL, registering 11 points in 36 games with the Canadiens before he was placed on waivers and later claimed by hometown team, the New Jersey Devils, on February 11, 2019. He was claimed by general manager Ray Shero, who originally drafted him while with the Penguins in 2010.

As the New Jersey Devils did not choose to re-sign Agostino, he left as a free agent and signed with the Toronto Maple Leafs on a two-year, one-way $700,000 contract. The deal was officially announced by the team nearly a month after it was initially rumored, on July 24.

Having played as a journeyman with 6 NHL clubs through 8 professional seasons, Agostino opted to pursue a career abroad, agreeing to a one-year contract as a free agent with Russian club Torpedo Nizhny Novgorod of Russia's top-tier Kontinental Hockey League (KHL) on June 1, 2021.

=== Europe ===
Agostino played through the 2021–22 KHL season, which was shortened by roughly 20 games (cancellations varied by team) due to the COVID-19 pandemic in Russia. On February 16, 2022, the KHL announced that it would proceed with the Gagarin Cup playoffs, with a start date of March 1. On February 24, the Russian invasion of Ukraine started, and by March 5 a number of non-Russian KHL players, as well as two complete teams based outside Russia, had withdrawn from the league. The NHL suspended all interactions with the KHL by March 8. Agostino was approached by a team in Sweden's top-tier Swedish Hockey League (SHL), but chose to sign a contract extension with Torpedo Nizhny Novgorod for the 2022–23 KHL season.

On August 21, 2023, after the conclusion of his contract extension in the KHL, Agostino agreed to a one-year contract with Swedish club Skellefteå AIK for the 2023–24 SHL season. Due to increased scrutiny over his choosing to extend his contract in the KHL when other non-Russian players left, and it directly opposing the SHL's stance to not sign players from that league, Agostino's contract was dissolved with the SHL on August 27, 2023.

On September 25, 2023, after the 2023-24 DEL season of Germany's top tier Deutsche Eishockey Liga had already started, Agostino signed a one-year contract with Düsseldorfer EG when that team lost top-six player Stephen MacAulay to a season-ending injury. He finished fourth in league scoring, but the team failed to qualify for the playoffs.

== Career statistics ==
=== Regular season and playoffs ===
			Regular season					Playoffs
Season	Team	League	GP	G	A	Pts	PIM	GP	G	A	Pts	PIM
2006–07	Delbarton School	HS-Prep	24	12	20	32		—	—	—	—	—
2006–07	New Jersey Colonials 14U AAA	AYHL	18	20	24	44	28	—	—	—	—	—
2007–08	Delbarton School	HS-Prep	24	24	48	72		—	—	—	—	—
2007–08	New Jersey Colonials 16U AAA	AYHL	24	21	28	49	14	—	—	—	—	—
2008–09	New Jersey Colonials 16U AAA	AYHL	29	30	43	73	26	—	—	—	—	—
2009–10	Delbarton School	HS-Prep	27	50	33	83	40	—	—	—	—	—
2009–10	New Jersey Colonials 18U AAA	AYHL	14	23	11	34	16	—	—	—	—	—
2009–10	U.S. NTDP U18	USDP	2	0	0	0	2	—	—	—	—	—
2010–11	Yale Bulldogs	ECAC	31	11	14	25	30	—	—	—	—	—
2011–12	Yale Bulldogs	ECAC	33	14	20	34	32	—	—	—	—	—
2012–13	Yale Bulldogs	ECAC	37	17	24	41	32	—	—	—	—	—
2013–14	Yale Bulldogs	ECAC	33	14	18	32	46	—	—	—	—	—
2013–14	Calgary Flames	NHL	8	1	1	2	0	—	—	—	—	—
2014–15	Adirondack Flames	AHL	67	15	28	43	52	—	—	—	—	—
2015–16	Stockton Heat	AHL	65	23	34	57	18	—	—	—	—	—
2015–16	Calgary Flames	NHL	2	0	0	0	0	—	—	—	—	—
2016–17	Chicago Wolves	AHL	65	24	59	83	48	10	5	5	10	8
2016–17	St. Louis Blues	NHL	7	1	2	3	2	—	—	—	—	—
2017–18	Providence Bruins	AHL	64	16	37	53	35	4	0	4	4	2
2017–18	Boston Bruins	NHL	5	0	1	1	4	—	—	—	—	—
2018–19	Laval Rocket	AHL	12	4	6	10	4	—	—	—	—	—
2018–19	Montreal Canadiens	NHL	36	2	9	11	26	—	—	—	—	—
2018–19	New Jersey Devils	NHL	27	4	9	13	8	—	—	—	—	—
2019–20	Toronto Marlies	AHL	53	27	22	49	36	—	—	—	—	—
2020–21	Toronto Marlies	AHL	22	9	13	22	2	—	—	—	—	—
2020–21	Toronto Maple Leafs	NHL	1	0	0	0	0	—	—	—	—	—
2021–22	Torpedo Nizhny Novgorod	KHL	46	20	20	40	16	—	—	—	—	—
2022–23	Torpedo Nizhny Novgorod	KHL	29	4	7	11	2	1	0	0	0	0
2023–24	Düsseldorfer EG	DEL	48	14	34	48	26	—	—	—	—	—
2024–25	ERC Ingolstadt	DEL	50	12	33	45	20	12	5	3	8	18
2025–26	ERC Ingolstadt	DEL	50	19	27	46	12	6	1	3	4	10
NHL totals			86	8	22	30	40	—	—	—	—	—
KHL totals			75	24	27	51	18	1	0	0	0	0

=== International ===
Year	Team	Event	Result	GP	G	A	Pts	PIM
2022	United States	OG	5th	4	1	0	1	8
Senior totals				4	1	0	1	8

== Awards and honors ==
Award	Year
College
All-ECAC Second All-Star Team	2013
All-Ivy League Second All-Star Team	2013, 2014
All-ECAC Third All-Star Team	2014
AHL
First All-Star Team	2017
John B. Sollenberger Trophy	2017
Les Cunningham Award	2017
