= Andrew Miller (ice hockey) =

American ice hockey player

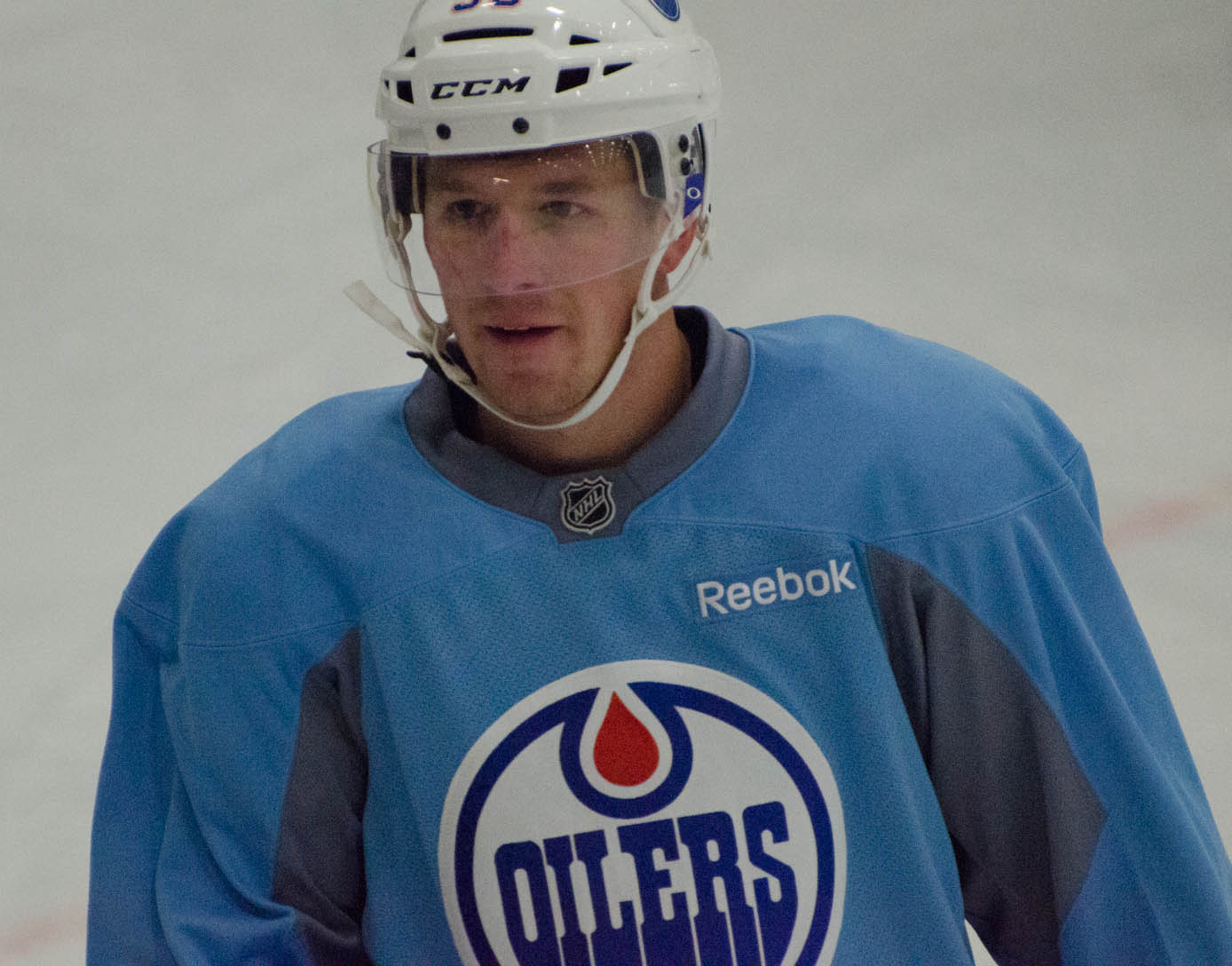
- Miller at the Oilers' training camp in 2014
- Born: September 18, 1988 (age 37) Bloomfield Hills, Michigan, U.S.
- Height: 5 ft 10 in (178 cm)
- Weight: 181 lb (82 kg; 12 st 13 lb)
- Position: Right wing
- Shot: Right
- Played for: Edmonton Oilers; HC Fribourg-Gottéron; Kunlun Red Star
- NHL draft: Undrafted
- Playing career: 2013–2020

Andrew Robert Miller IV (born September 18, 1988) is an American former professional ice hockey player.

== Playing career ==
In his senior collegiate season in 2012–13, Miller was instrumental in helping Yale to the National Championship, scoring the overtime-winning goal in the semi-final against UMass Lowell to send Yale to its first-ever National Championship game. Miller scored the third goal and assisted on an empty-net goal with 6:38 left in the Championship game, to go up 4–0 on Quinnipiac.

On April 17, 2013, the Edmonton Oilers agreed to terms with Miller on a one-year entry-level contract. On July 15, 2014, the Edmonton Oilers agreed to terms for another one-year deal for the 2014–15 season.

On March 27, 2015, he scored his first NHL goal against Kari Lehtonen of the Dallas Stars during a penalty shot. Miller is the first player in Oilers franchise history to score his first NHL goal on a penalty shot.

In the following 2015–16 season, Miller featured in a further 6 scoreless games with the Oilers but was primarily assigned to the AHL affiliate Bakersfield Condors. After producing 39 points in 44 games with the Condors, Miller was loaned by the Oilers to the Charlotte Checkers, an affiliate of the Carolina Hurricanes, in exchange for Zach Boychuk on March 7, 2016.

While Miller was released to free agency by the Oilers in the off-season, he opted to remain with the Carolina Hurricanes, agreeing to a one-year, two-way contract on July 1, 2016.

On June 13, 2017, the Hurricanes re-signed Miller to a one-year, two-way contract worth $650,000 at the NHL level and $285,000 at the AHL level, with a guarantee of $305,000.

On May 1, 2018, Miller signed a one-year contract with HC Fribourg-Gottéron of the National League (NL). In his debut European 2018–19 season, Miller contributed offensively with 11 goals and 27 points in 40 games with Fribourg-Gottéron.

After missing the post-season with Fribourg-Gottéron, Miller left Switzerland after his contract and signed a two-year contract with Chinese club, HC Kunlun Red Star of the KHL, on May 23, 2019.

== Career statistics ==
			Regular season					Playoffs
Season	Team	League	GP	G	A	Pts	PIM	GP	G	A	Pts	PIM
2005–06	Cranbrook Schools	HS-MI						—	—	—	—	—
2006–07	Cranbrook Schools	HS-MI		37	45	82		—	—	—	—	—
2007–08	Chicago Steel	USHL	59	14	27	41	28	7	2	4	6	4
2008–09	Chicago Steel	USHL	58	32	50	82	76	—	—	—	—	—
2009–10	Yale University	ECAC	34	5	29	34	12	—	—	—	—	—
2010–11	Yale University	ECAC	36	12	33	45	18	—	—	—	—	—
2011–12	Yale University	ECAC	34	7	29	36	8	—	—	—	—	—
2012–13	Yale University	ECAC	37	18	23	41	15	—	—	—	—	—
2013–14	Oklahoma City Barons	AHL	52	8	26	34	14	3	0	0	0	4
2014–15	Oklahoma City Barons	AHL	63	27	33	60	16	10	3	3	6	8
2014–15	Edmonton Oilers	NHL	9	1	5	6	0	—	—	—	—	—
2015–16	Bakersfield Condors	AHL	44	15	24	39	18	—	—	—	—	—
2015–16	Edmonton Oilers	NHL	6	0	0	0	0	—	—	—	—	—
2015–16	Charlotte Checkers	AHL	11	3	3	6	0	—	—	—	—	—
2016–17	Charlotte Checkers	AHL	55	11	30	41	10	5	3	2	5	2
2017–18	Charlotte Checkers	AHL	55	15	37	52	20	8	1	4	5	4
2018–19	HC Fribourg–Gottéron	NL	40	11	16	27	12	—	—	—	—	—
2019–20	Kunlun Red Star	KHL	52	11	20	31	16	—	—	—	—	—
NHL totals			15	1	5	6	0	—	—	—	—	—

== Awards and honors ==
Award	Year
USHL
Dave Tyler Junior Player of the Year Award	2008–09
Player of the Year	2008–09
Forward of the Year	2008–09
College
All-ECAC Hockey First Team	2010–11
ECAC Hockey All-Tournament Team	2011
All-ECAC Hockey First Team	2012–13
AHCA East Second-Team All-American	2012–13
NCAA All-Tournament Team	2013
NCAA Championship	2013
AHL
All-Star Game	2015

Awards and achievements
Preceded by Parker Milner	NCAA Tournament Most Outstanding Player; 2013	Succeeded by Shayne Gostisbehere
