= 2013 NCAA Division I men's ice hockey tournament =

- 2013 Frozen Four logo
- Teams: 16
- Finals site: Consol Energy Center, Pittsburgh, Pennsylvania
- Champions: Yale Bulldogs (1st title)
- Runner-up: Quinnipiac Bobcats (1st title game)
- Semifinalists: St. Cloud State Huskies (1st Frozen Four); Massachusetts–Lowell River Hawks (1st Frozen Four)
- Winning coach: Keith Allain (1st title)
- MOP: Andrew Miller (Yale)
- Attendance: 18,184 (Championship); 53,040 (Frozen Four); 109,940 (Tournament)

The 2013 NCAA Division I men's ice hockey tournament was the national championship tournament for men's college ice hockey in the United States in 2013. The tournament involved 16 teams in single-elimination play to determine the national champion at the Division I level of the National Collegiate Athletic Association (NCAA), the highest level of competition in college hockey. The tournament's Frozen Four – the semifinals and finals – was hosted by Robert Morris University at the Consol Energy Center in Pittsburgh. Robert Morris' bid to host was co-sponsored by VisitPittsburgh and the Pittsburgh Penguins.

Yale defeated Quinnipiac 4–0 in the championship game to win the program's first NCAA title. This was the first time since 1978 that two teams from ECAC Hockey reached the national championship game.

This year’s Frozen Four was the second year in a row to feature multiple teams making their first appearances, with Massachusetts-Lowell, Quinnipiac and St. Cloud State all making their Frozen Four debut.

== Tournament procedure ==
2013 Regionals (blue) and Frozen Four (red)

The tournament consists of four groups of four teams in regional brackets. The four regionals are officially named after their geographic areas. The following were the sites for the 2013 regionals:

March 29 and 30
Northeast Regional, Verizon Wireless Arena – Manchester, New Hampshire (Host: University of New Hampshire)
West Regional, Van Andel Arena – Grand Rapids, Michigan (Host: University of Michigan)
March 30 and 31
East Regional, Dunkin' Donuts Center – Providence, Rhode Island (Host: Brown University)
Midwest Regional, Huntington Center – Toledo, Ohio (Host: Bowling Green State University)

The winner of each regional will advance to the Frozen Four:

April 11 and 13
Consol Energy Center – Pittsburgh, Pennsylvania (Host: Robert Morris University)

== Qualifying teams ==
The at-large bids and seeding for each team in the tournament were announced on March 24. The Western Collegiate Hockey Association (WCHA) had six teams receive a berth in the tournament, ECAC Hockey and Hockey East each had three teams receive a berth, and the Central Collegiate Hockey Association (CCHA) and Atlantic Hockey each had two teams receive a berth.

East Regional – Providence					Midwest Regional – Toledo				
Seed	School	Conference	Record	Berth type	Seed	School	Conference	Record	Berth type
1	Quinnipiac (1)	ECAC Hockey	27–7–5	At-large bid	1	Notre Dame (4)	CCHA	25–12–3	Tournament champion
2	Boston College	Hockey East	22–11–4	At-large bid	2	Miami	CCHA	24–11–5	At-large bid
3	Union	ECAC Hockey	21–12–5	Tournament champion	3	Minnesota State	WCHA	24–13–3	At-large bid
4	Canisius	Atlantic Hockey	19–18–5	Tournament champion	4	St. Cloud State	WCHA	23–15–1	At-large bid
West Regional – Grand Rapids					Northeast Regional – Manchester				
Seed	School	Conference	Record	Berth type	Seed	School	Conference	Record	Berth type
1	Minnesota (2)	WCHA	26–8–5	At-large bid	1	Massachusetts–Lowell (3)	Hockey East	26–10–2	Tournament champion
2	North Dakota	WCHA	21–12–7	At-large bid	2	New Hampshire	Hockey East	19–11–7	At-large bid
3	Niagara	Atlantic Hockey	23–9–5	At-large bid	3	Denver	WCHA	20–13–5	At-large bid
4	Yale	ECAC Hockey	18–12–3	At-large bid	4	Wisconsin	WCHA	22–12–7	Tournament champion

Number in parentheses denotes overall seed in the tournament.

== Regionals ==
=== East Regional – Providence, Rhode Island ===
Regional semifinals March 30
1	Quinnipiac (1)	4
4	Canisius	3
3	Union	5
2	Boston College	1

Regional final March 31
1	Quinnipiac	5
3	Union	1

Note: * denotes overtime period(s)
All times are local (UTC−4).

==== Regional semifinals ====
March 30, 2013; 5:30 pm ESPN3	(4) Canisius	3–4 (0–1, 2–0, 1–3)	(1) Quinnipiac	Dunkin' Donuts Center, Providence; Attendance: 6253

Game reference

Tony Capobianco
Goalies
Eric Hartzell
Referees:
Brad Shepherd
Todd Anderson
Linesmen:
Andy Dokken
Justin Hills

	0 – 1	8:43 – C. Jones (K. Jones)
Farrell (Shupe, Cuddemi) – 24:24	1 – 1
Sullivan (McKellar, Parker) – 25:08	2 – 1
Gibbons – 43:43	3 – 1
	3 – 2	48:02 – Peca (C. Jones)
	3 – 3	50:42 – Samuels-Thomas (Dalhuisen, Davies) (PP)
	3 – 4	54:28 – Bui (Van Brabant, Arnt)

6 min
Penalties
4 min
23
Shots
40

March 30, 2013; 9:00 pm ESPNU	(3) Union	5–1 (1–0, 3–0, 1–1)	(2) Boston College	Dunkin' Donuts Center, Providence; Attendance: 6253

Game reference

Troy Grosenick
Goalies
Parker Milner
Referees:
Ryan Sweeney
Shane Ferrier
Linesmen:
Brendon Blanchard
Bill McGoldrick

Jooris (Sullivan, Carr) (PP) – 9:25	1 – 0
Jooris (Simpson) – 20:39	2 – 0
Ikkala (Novak) – 21:04	3 – 0
Gostisbehere (Carr, Hatch) (PP) – 38:16	4 – 0
Ciampini (Coburn, Simpson) (PP) – 45:19	5 – 0
	5 – 1	56:02 – Gaudreau (Wey)

14 min
Penalties
14 min
35
Shots
30

==== Regional final ====
March 31, 2013; 6:30 pm ESPNU	(3) Union	1–5 (0–3, 0–2, 1–0)	(1) Quinnipiac	Dunkin' Donuts Center, Providence; Attendance: 5007

Game reference

Troy Grosenick
Goalies
Eric Hartzell
Referees:
Derek Shepherd
Marco Hunt
Linesmen:
Sam Shikowsky
Nick Bradshaw

	0 – 1	9:46 – Peca (C. Jones, K. Jones)
	0 – 2	10:59 – Peca
	0 – 3	12:58 – Peca (K. Jones) (PP)
	0 – 4	27:22 – Samuels-Thomas (St. Denis, Davies) (PP)
	0 – 5	31:42 – K. Jones (Peca, C. Jones)
Ciampini (Coburn, Simpson) (PP) – 43:15	1 – 5

38 min
Penalties
12 min
19
Shots
26

=== West Regional – Grand Rapids, Michigan ===
Regional semifinals March 29
1	Minnesota (2)	2
4	Yale	3*
3	Niagara	1
2	North Dakota	2

Regional final March 30
4	Yale	4
2	North Dakota	1

Note: * denotes overtime period(s)
All times are local (UTC−4).

==== Regional semifinals ====
March 29, 2013; 2:00 pm ESPNU	(4) Yale	3 – 2 OT (0–0, 2–0, 0–2, 1–0)	(1) Minnesota	Van Andel Arena, Grand Rapids; Attendance: 2289

Game reference

Jeff Malcolm
Goalies
Adam Wilcox
Referees:
Jeff Bunyon
Kevin Shea
Linesmen:
Chris Millea
Bob Bernard

Agostino (Miller, O'Gara) – 27:08	1 – 0
Young (Bourbonais, Wilson) (PP) – 35:28	2 – 0
	2 – 1	48:12 – Schmidt (Rau, Haula) (PP)
	2 – 2	53:40 – Budish (Haula)
Root (Agostino) – 60:09	3 – 2

10 min
Penalties
6 min
26
Shots
28

March 29, 2013; 5:30 pm ESPNU	(3) Niagara	1–2 (0–0, 1–0, 0–2)	(2) North Dakota	Van Andel Arena, Grand Rapids; Attendance: 2289

Game reference

Carsen Chubak
Goalies
Zane Gothberg
Referees:
Jack Millea
Scott Hansen
Linesmen:
Marc Sullivan
Tommy George

Beattie (Williams) – 26:27	1 – 0
	1 – 1	41:56 – MacWilliam
	1 – 2	53:40 – Kristo (Forbort, Grimaldi)

14 min
Penalties
14 min
29
Shots
43

==== Regional final ====
March 30, 2013; 4:00 pm ESPNU	(4) Yale	4–1 (0–1, 0–0, 4–0)	(2) North Dakota	Van Andel Arena, Grand Rapids; Attendance: 1918

Game reference

Jeff Malcolm
Goalies
Clarke Saunders
Referees:
Jeff Bunyon
Kevin Shea
Linesmen:
Bob Bernard
Tom George

	0 – 1	7:22 – Knight (MacWilliam, Forbort)
Balch (Day, Wilson) – 52:25	1 – 1
Root (Miller, Fallen) (PP) – 55:04	2 – 1
Wilson (Day) – 57:39	3 – 1
Agostino (EN) – 59:00	4 – 1

8 min
Penalties
12 min
39
Shots
25

=== Northeast Regional – Manchester, New Hampshire ===
Regional semifinals March 29
1	Massachusetts–Lowell (3)	6
4	Wisconsin	1
3	Denver	2
2	New Hampshire	5

Regional final March 30
1	Massachusetts–Lowell	2
2	New Hampshire	0

Note: * denotes overtime period(s)
All times are local (UTC−4).

==== Regional semifinals ====
March 29, 2013; 4:30 pm ESPN3	(4) Wisconsin	1–6 (0–1, 0–2, 1–3)	(1) Massachusetts–Lowell	Verizon Wireless Arena, Manchester; Attendance: 8049

Game reference

Joel Rumpel
Goalies
Connor Hellebuyck
Referees:
Steve McInchak
Brian Aaron
Linesmen:
T. J. Likens
Joseph Hutek

	0 – 1	7:11 – Pendenza (White, Houk)
	0 – 2	23:12 – Folin (Wilson)
	0 – 3	34:08 – Thompson (Suter)
Kerdiles (LaBate, Ramage) (PP) – 48:19	1 – 3
	1 – 4	53:56 – Arnold (McGrath)
	1 – 5	59:12 – Chapie (EN)
	1 – 6	59:57 – McGrath (Amlong) (PP)

12 min
Penalties
14 min
32
Shots
26

March 29, 2013; 8:00 pm ESPNU	(3) Denver	2–5 (2–1, 0–2, 0–2)	(2) New Hampshire	Verizon Wireless Arena, Manchester; Attendance: 8049

Game reference

Juho Olkinuora
Goalies
Casey DeSmith

Doremus (Jacobson, Tabrum) – 2:24	1–0
	1–1	5:39 – Thrush (Pesce, van Riemsdyk)
Q. Shore (N. Shore) – 17:21	2–1
	2–2	34:34 – van Riemsdyk (Knodel, Downing) (PP)
	2–3	39:38 – Speelman (Kostolansky, Hardowa)
	2–4	48:49 – Henrion (Agosta, Sorkin)
	2–5	57:40 – Thrush (Henrion, Silengo) (EN)

31 min
Penalties
14 min
33
Shots
41

==== Regional final ====
March 30, 2013; 6:30 pm ESPNU	(2) New Hampshire	0–2 (0–0, 0–1, 0–1)	(1) Massachusetts–Lowell	Verizon Wireless Arena, Manchester; Attendance: 8357

Game reference
Casey DeSmith	Goalies	Connor Hellebuyck
0–1 / 39:30 – Wilson (Ruhwedel, White); 0–2 / 53:58 – Chapie (Wilson)
6 min	Penalties	6 min
28	Shots	28

=== Midwest Regional – Toledo, Ohio ===
Regional semifinals March 30
1	Notre Dame (4)	1
4	St. Cloud State	5
3	Minnesota State	0
2	Miami	4

Regional final March 31
2	Miami	1
4	St. Cloud State	4

Note: * denotes overtime period(s)
All times are local (UTC−4).

==== Regional semifinals ====
March 30, 2013; 1:30 pm ESPN3	(4) St. Cloud State	5–1 (1–0, 3–0, 1–1)	(1) Notre Dame	Huntington Center, Toledo; Attendance: 2988

Game reference

Ryan Faragher
Goalies
Steven Summerhays
Mike Johnson
Referees:
Chip McDonald
Robert St. Lawrence
Linesmen:
Dave Blow
Justin Pruszak

Hanowski (Prochno, Kossila) – 11:32	1 – 0
Benik (Jensen, Hanowski) (PP) – 29:28	2 – 0
Thorson (Bertsch, Benik) – 33:35	3 – 0
Brodzinski (Murray) – 34:53	4 – 0
	4 – 1	47:44 – Voran (Rust) (SH)
Benik (Prow, Prochno) (PP) – 51:07	5 – 1

2 min
Penalties
14 min
23
Shots
18

March 30, 2013; 5:00 pm ESPN3	(3) Minnesota State	0–4 (0–0, 0–1, 0–3)	(2) Miami	Huntington Center, Toledo; Attendance: 2988

Game reference

Stephon Williams
Goalies
Ryan McKay
Referees:
Peter Feolia
Scott Whittemore
Linesmen:
Glen Cooke
Jim Briggs

0 – 1	31:04 – McKenzie (Czarnik, Barber)
0 – 2	42:30 – Hagel (Coleman, Murphy)
0 – 3	49:24 – Murphy (Cook, Coleman)
0 – 4	59:02 – Cook (Czarnik) (EN)

15 min
Penalties
8 min
20
Shots
26

==== Regional final ====
March 31, 2013; 4:00 pm ESPNU	(4) St. Cloud State	4–1 (1–0, 2–1, 1–0)	(2) Miami	Huntington Center, Toledo; Attendance: 2460

Game reference

Ryan Faragher
Goalies
Ryan McKay
Referees:
Pete Feola
Chip McDonald
Linesmen:
David Brown
Glen Cooke

Benik (Thorson) – 5:28	1 – 0
Benik (Bertsch, Gravel) – 25:36	2 – 0
	2 – 1	27:50 – Coleman (Spinell, Wideman) (PP)
Thorson (Bertsch) – 30:12	3 – 1
Thorson (EN) – 59:59	4 – 1

8 min
Penalties
8 min
22
Shots
21

== Frozen Four – Pittsburgh ==
The Frozen Four featured four teams that were seeking their first championship. This was only the second time this had happened since the first NCAA championship tournament in 1948, the other time being in 1958. Additionally, of the four Frozen Four participants in 2013, only Yale had previously reached the tournament semifinals, having finished third in the 1952 tournament. Yale's championship was the first for a team from ECAC Hockey since 1989. The championship game between Yale and Quinnipiac was the first time the championship game was contested between two ECAC Hockey teams since 1978. With Quinnipiac defeating Union to advance to the Frozen Four and Quinnipiac losing to Yale in the final, the only teams to defeat an ECAC school in the tournament were other schools from the ECAC.

National semifinals April 11
E1	Quinnipiac	4
MW4	St. Cloud State	1
W4	Yale	3*
NE1	Massachusetts–Lowell	2

National championship April 13
E1	Quinnipiac	0
W4	Yale	4

Note: * denotes overtime period(s)
All times are local (UTC−4).

=== National semifinals ===
April 11, 2013; 4:30 pm ESPN2	(W4) Yale	3–2 (2–0, 0–2, 0–0, 1–0)	(NE1) Massachusetts–Lowell	Consol Energy Center, Pittsburgh; Attendance: 17,428

Game reference

Jeff Malcolm
Goalies
Connor Hellebuyck

Witek (Cooper, Miller) (PP) – 12:55	1–0
Laganiere (Killian) – 19:09	2–0
	2–1	34:38 – Wetmore (Arnold, Wilson)
	2–2	34:52 – Pendenza (White, Holmstrom)
Miller (Cooper) – 66:59	3–2

2 min
Penalties
8 min
47
Shots
18

April 11, 2013; 8:00 pm ESPN2	(MW4) St. Cloud State	1–4 (0–3, 1–1, 0–0)	(E1) Quinnipiac	Consol Energy Center, Pittsburgh; Attendance: 17,428

Game reference

Ryan Faragher
Goalies
Eric Hartzell

	0–1	1:49 – Samuels-Thomas (Goodman) (PP)
	0–2	5:07 – Arnt (Samuels-Thomas)
	0–3	11:19 – Langlois (Davies)
Benik (Gravel, Thorson) – 26:25	1–3
	1–4	34:31 – K. Jones (Tolkinen, Davies)

8 min
Penalties
10 min
34
Shots
28

=== National championship ===
April 13, 2013; 7:00 pm ESPN	(W4) Yale	4–0 (0–0, 1–0, 3–0)	(E1) Quinnipiac	Consol Energy Center, Pittsburgh; Attendance: 18,184

Game reference
Referees: Jeff Bunyon; Kevin Shea; Linesmen: Bob Bernard; Tommy George

Scoring summary
Period	Team	Goal	Assist(s)	Time	Score
1st	None				
2nd	Yale	Clinton Bourbonais (4)	Young	39:56	1–0 Yale
3rd	Yale	Charles Orzetti (2)	Bourbonais and Laganière	43:35	2–0 Yale
3rd	Yale	Andrew Miller (18)	Agostino	49:06	3–0 Yale
3rd	Yale	Jesse Root (12) – EN	Miller and O'Gara	53:02	4–0 Yale
Penalty summary
Period	Team	Player	Penalty	Time	PIM
1st	Yale	Rob O'Gara	Elbowing	02:41	2:00
1st	QUI	Cory Hibbeler	Interference	04:51	2:00
1st	Yale	Colin Dueck	Tripping	07:48	2:00
1st	QUI	Mike Dalhuisen	Tripping	15:23	2:00
2nd	QUI	Jeremy Langlois	Roughing	27:17	2:00
2nd	Yale	Bench (Served by Anthony Day)	Too many men on ice	30:28	2:00
2nd	Yale	Clinton Bourbonais	Charging	31:25	2:00
2nd	QUI	Bench (Served by Russell Goodman)	Too many men on ice	32:38	2:00
2nd	QUI	Zach Davies	Interference	33:25	2:00
3rd	Yale	Antoine Laganière	Slashing	51:37	2:00
3rd	QUI	Travis St. Denis	Slashing	51:37	2:00

Shots by period
Team	1	2	3	T
Yale	9	14	8	31
Quinnipiac	11	15	10	36

Goaltenders
Team	Name	Saves	Goals against	Time on ice
Yale	Jeff Malcolm	36	0	60:00
QUI	Eric Hartzell	27	3	59:24

== Record by conference ==
Conference	# of Bids	Record	Win %	Regional Finals	Frozen Four	Championship Game	Champions
WCHA	6	3–6	.333	2	1	–	–
ECAC Hockey	3	8–2	.800	3	2	2	1
Hockey East	3	3–3	.500	2	1	–	–
CCHA	2	1–2	.333	1	–	–	–
Atlantic Hockey	2	0–2	.000	–	–	–	–

== Media ==
=== Television ===
ESPN had US television rights to all games during the tournament. For the ninth consecutive year ESPN aired every game, beginning with the regionals, on ESPN, ESPN2, and ESPNU, and ESPN3. They also streamed them online via WatchESPN.

==== Broadcast Assignments ====
Regionals

- Northeast Regional: Clay Matvick & Jim Paradise – Manchester, New Hampshire
- West Regional: Joe Davis & Sean Ritchlin – Grand Rapids, Michigan
- East Regional: John Buccigross & Barry Melrose – Providence, Rhode Island
- Midwest Regional: Ben Holden & Darren Eliot – Toledo, Ohio

Frozen Four & Championship

- John Buccigross, Barry Melrose, & Clay Matvick – Pittsburgh, Pennsylvania

=== Radio ===
Dial Global Sports used exclusive radio rights to air both the semifinals and the championship, AKA the "Frozen Four."

- Sean Grande & Cap Raeder

== All-Tournament Team ==
=== Frozen Four ===
- G: Jeff Malcolm (Yale)
- D: Zach Davies (Quinnipiac)
- D: Gus Young (Yale)
- F: Clinton Bourbonais (Yale)
- F: Andrew Miller* (Yale)
- F: Jordan Samuels-Thomas (Quinnipiac)

* Most Outstanding Player(s)
