= Colton Point =

Canadian ice hockey player (born 1998)

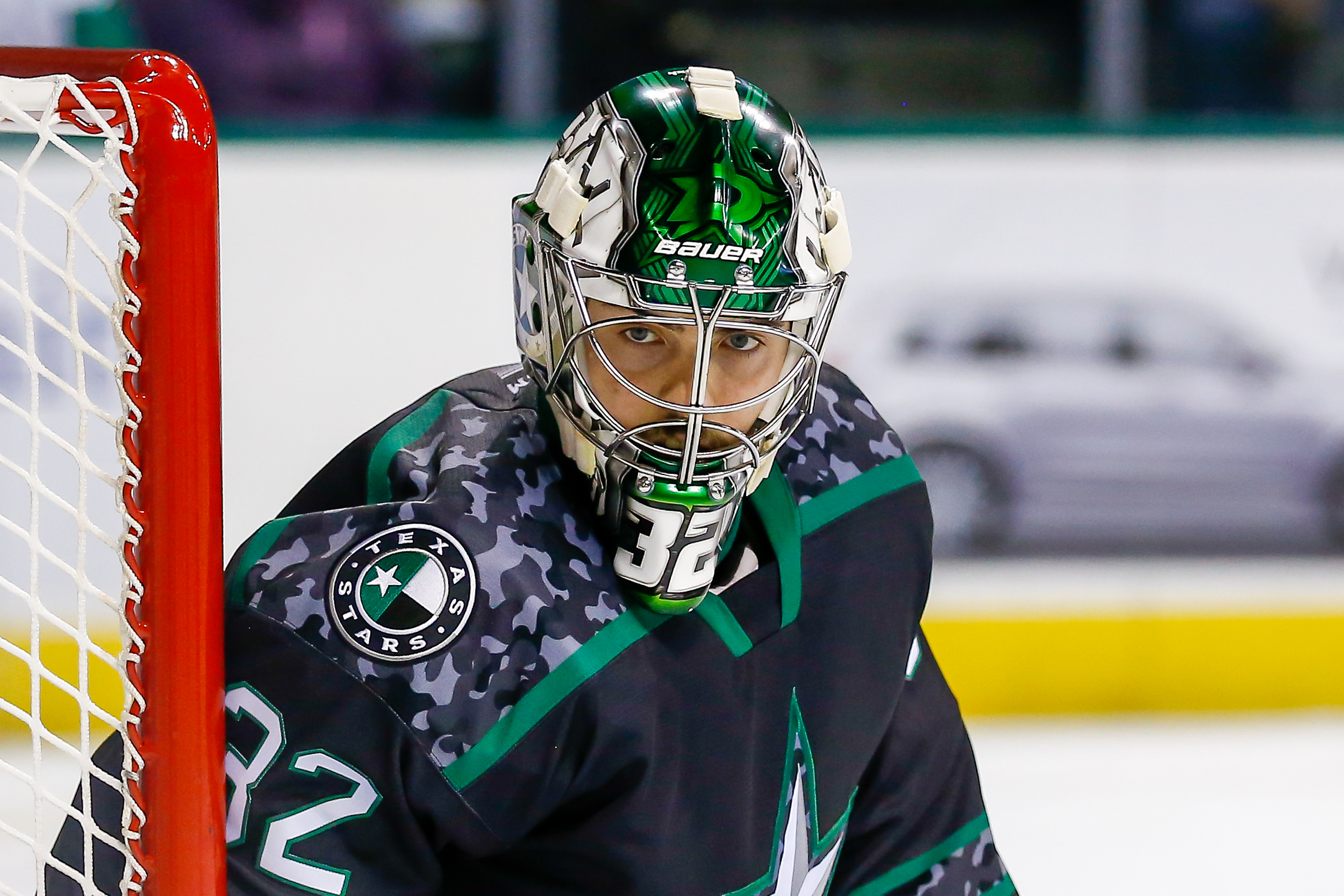
- Point with the Texas Stars in 2021
- Born: March 4, 1998 (age 28) North Bay, Ontario, Canada
- Height: 6 ft 4 in (193 cm)
- Weight: 220 lb (100 kg; 15 st 10 lb)
- Position: Goaltender
- Caught: Left
- Played for: Texas Stars
- NHL draft: 128th overall, 2016; Dallas Stars
- Playing career: 2018–2023

Colton Robert Point (born March 4, 1998) is a Canadian former professional ice hockey goaltender. Point was drafted in the fifth-round, 128th overall, by the Dallas Stars in the 2016 NHL entry draft. Prior to turning professional, he attended Colgate University, where he was named to the AHCA East Second-Team All-American, NCAA (ECAC) Second All-Star Team, and was a Hobey Baker Award finalist.

Internationally, Point has represented Canada at the 2018 World Junior Ice Hockey Championships where he won gold.

== Early life ==
Point was born and raised in North Bay to parents Gary and Colleen. He attended Chippewa Secondary School before committing to Colgate University.

== Playing career ==
=== Junior ===
Point played Junior hockey with the Carleton Place Canadians for one year during the 2015–16 season. During that season, he led the Canadians to the Fred Page Cup and was named to the Tournament All-Star Team.

Leading up to the 2016 NHL entry draft, Point was ranked fourth overall for North American goaltenders by the NHL Central Scouting Bureau. Point was eventually drafted in the fifth round, 128th overall, by the Dallas Stars in the 2016 NHL Entry Draft. Despite having the option to join the Erie Otters in the Ontario Hockey League, Point kept his commitment and attended Colgate University that year on a Division 1 hockey scholarship.

=== Collegiate ===
While majoring in Educational Studies at Colgate University, Point played in only 10 games for the Raiders in his freshman season due to an illness. In those 10 games, Point recorded a .918 save percentage. At the end of the season, Point was awarded the Judge Harry J Reynolds Memorial Trophy for his dedication to hockey.

Point's sophomore season was much more successful. He played in 33 games and recorded a 16-12-5 record with a .944 save percentage during the 2017–18 season. At the conclusion of the season, Point was named an AHCA East Second-Team All-American as well as a top 10-Hobey Baker Award finalist and NCAA (ECAC) Second All-Star Team. Point was planning on re-joining Colgate University the following season but was convinced by Stars general manager Jim Nill and player development coordinator Rich Peverley to turn professional earlier. On July 1, 2018, the Stars signed Point to a three-year, entry-level contract.

=== Professional ===
Point began the 2018–19 season in the American Hockey League (AHL) with the Texas Stars after being cut from the Dallas Stars training camp. After playing five games in the AHL, Point was assigned to the Stars ECHL team, the Idaho Steelheads, where he made his debut on November 7, 2018. On November 18, he was reassigned to the Texas Stars after playing in four games.

Leaving the Stars organization as a free agent after four seasons, Point continued his professional career in agreeing to a one-year contract with the Fort Wayne Komets of the ECHL on August 22, 2022. He was later signed to a one-year AHL contract with the Komets affiliate, the Bakersfield Condors, on September 14, 2022.

Re-assigned to continue his tenure with the Fort Wayne Komets in the 2022–23 season, Point registered just 2 wins in 11 games before opting to end his five-year professional career on March 1, 2023.

== International play ==
Medal record

Representing Canada

Ice hockey

World Junior Championships
| Gold medal – first place | 2018 United States | |

Having the choice to play for either the United States or Canada due to being a dual citizen, Point has chosen to represent Canada internationally. He was named to Team Canada's junior team at the 2018 World Junior Ice Hockey Championships where he played backup to goaltender Carter Hart. Point played one game during the tournament, a 6–0 shutout against Slovakia to help Canada on the route to gold.

== Career statistics ==
=== Regular season and playoffs ===
| | | | Regular season | | | | | | | | | Playoffs |
| Season | Team | League | GP | W | L | OT | MIN | GA | SO | GAA | SV% | GP | W | L | MIN | GA | SO | GAA | SV% |
|---|---|---|---|---|---|---|---|---|---|---|---|---|---|---|---|---|---|---|---|
| 2015–16 | Carleton Place Canadians | CCHL | 33 | 23 | 6 | 2 | 1891 | 68 | 7 | 2.16 | .915 | 16 | — | — | — | — | — | 1.82 | .933 |
| 2016–17 | Colgate University | ECAC | 10 | 2 | 5 | 2 | 589 | 24 | 0 | 2.45 | .918 | — | — | — | — | — | — | — | — |
| 2017–18 | Colgate University | ECAC | 33 | 16 | 12 | 5 | 1997 | 58 | 6 | 1.74 | .944 | — | — | — | — | — | — | — | — |
| 2018–19 | Texas Stars | AHL | 7 | 2 | 3 | 1 | 335 | 21 | 0 | 3.77 | .857 | — | — | — | — | — | — | — | — |
| 2018–19 | Idaho Steelheads | ECHL | 13 | 5 | 3 | 1 | 622 | 34 | 0 | 3.28 | .887 | — | — | — | — | — | — | — | — |
| 2019–20 | Idaho Steelheads | ECHL | 20 | 7 | 9 | 2 | 1133 | 54 | 1 | 2.86 | .898 | — | — | — | — | — | — | — | — |
| 2019–20 | Texas Stars | AHL | 1 | 0 | 1 | 0 | 60 | 4 | 0 | 4.00 | .875 | — | — | — | — | — | — | — | — |
| 2020–21 | Texas Stars | AHL | 16 | 8 | 5 | 1 | 878 | 45 | 0 | 3.08 | .898 | — | — | — | — | — | — | — | — |
| 2021–22 | Texas Stars | AHL | 5 | 1 | 2 | 0 | 191 | 14 | 0 | 4.40 | .843 | — | — | — | — | — | — | — | — |
| 2021–22 | Idaho Steelheads | ECHL | 19 | 7 | 8 | 2 | 1057 | 45 | 3 | 2.56 | .912 | — | — | — | — | — | — | — | — |
| 2021–22 | Texas Stars | AHL | 5 | 1 | 2 | 0 | 191 | 14 | 0 | 4.40 | .843 | — | — | — | — | — | — | — | — |
| 2022–23 | Fort Wayne Komets | ECHL | 11 | 2 | 5 | 1 | 526 | 43 | 0 | 4.91 | .851 | — | — | — | — | — | — | — | — |
| AHL totals | | | 29 | 11 | 11 | 2 | 1,464 | 84 | 0 | 3.45 | .882 | — | — | — | — | — | — | — | — |

=== International ===
| Year | Team | Event | Result | GP | W | L | OT | MIN | GA | SO | GAA | SV% |
|---|---|---|---|---|---|---|---|---|---|---|---|---|
| 2018 | Canada | WJC | 1st place, gold medalist(s) | 1 | 1 | 0 | 0 | 60 | 0 | 1 | 0.00 | 1.000 |
| Junior totals | | | | 1 | 1 | 0 | 0 | 60 | 0 | 1 | 0.00 | 1.000 |

== Awards and honors ==
| Award | Year | Ref |
College
| Judge Harry J Reynolds Memorial Trophy | 2017 | |
| AHCA East Second-Team All-American | 2018 | |
| Top 10 Hobey Baker Award Finalist | 2018 | |
| Mike Richter Award Finalist | 2018 | |
| ECAC Hockey Player of the Year Finalist | 2018 | |
| ECAC Hockey Goaltender of the Year Finalist | 2018 | |
| 2017-18 Colgate Student-Athlete of the Year | 2018 | |
| NCAA (ECAC) Second All-Star Team | 2018 | |
