= Rob O'Gara =

American ice hockey player

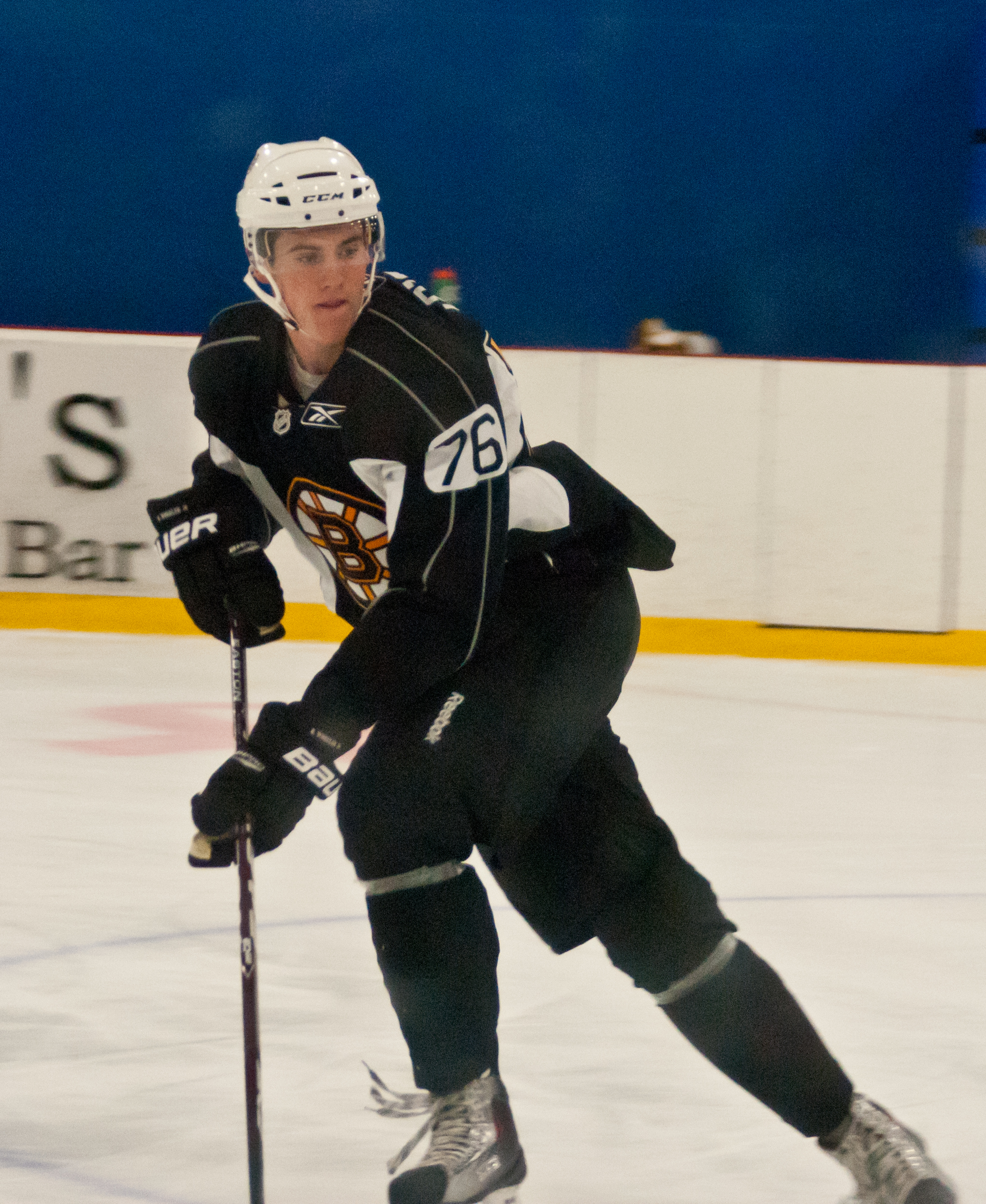
- O'Gara at the Boston Bruins 2011 Development Camp
- Born: July 6, 1993 (age 33) Massapequa, New York, U.S.
- Height: 6 ft 4 in (193 cm)
- Weight: 207 lb (94 kg; 14 st 11 lb)
- Position: Defense
- Shot: Left
- Played for: Boston Bruins; New York Rangers
- NHL draft: 151st overall, 2011; Boston Bruins
- Playing career: 2016–2021 Coaching career

Biographical details
- Education: Yale University

Coaching career (HC unless noted)
- 2021–2026: Yale (assistant)

Robert Dominick O'Gara (born July 6, 1993) is an American professional ice hockey defenseman who retired following the 2021 season. He was an Assistant Coach for the men's Yale Hockey team. O'Gara was selected by the Boston Bruins in the fifth-round (151st overall) of the 2011 NHL entry draft.

== Playing career ==
O'Gara was born on Long Island, to parents Christine Rittmeyer and Brian O'Gara. As a youth, he played in the 2006 Quebec International Pee-Wee Hockey Tournament with the New York Islanders minor ice hockey team. Rob grew up a die-hard New York Islanders fan, a fact he shared during an interview with The Broadway Hat Podcast. Following two seasons at Milton Academy, O'Gara enrolled at Yale University to play NCAA Division I hockey with the Yale Bulldogs. In his freshman season he helped the Bulldogs capture the 2012–13 NCAA Championship, the first national championship title for the team. The following season, O'Gara was named to the NCAA All-Ivy League Second Team, and in his junior year his outstanding play was rewarded when he selected as ECAC Hockey's Best Defensive Defenseman and was named to the NCAA (East) First All-American Team.

On March 29, 2016, the Boston Bruins signed O'Gara to a two-year, entry-level contract beginning in the 2016–17 season. The Providence Bruins, the AHL affiliate to Boston, signed him to an ATO (amateur try-out) for the remainder of the 2015–16 season.

On February 20, 2018, the Bruins traded O'Gara, along with a 2018 third-round draft pick, to the New York Rangers in exchange for Nick Holden.

On August 20, 2019, as a free agent from the Rangers, O'Gara signed one-year AHL contract with the San Antonio Rampage, the primary affiliate of the St. Louis Blues. Entering the 2019–20 season, O'Gara was limited to just 5 scoreless games with the Rampage, serving as a depth option to the blueline. On December 6, 2019, O'Gara was traded to the Springfield Thunderbirds, affiliate to the Florida Panthers, in exchange for future considerations.

As a free agent from the Thunderbirds leading into the pandemic delayed 2020–21 season, O'Gara was signed to a professional tryout contract to attend the Hershey Bears training camp on January 20, 2021.

== Career statistics ==
			Regular season					Playoffs
Season	Team	League	GP	G	A	Pts	PIM	GP	G	A	Pts	PIM
2010–11	Milton Academy	USHS	29	2	7	9	22	—	—	—	—	—
2011–12	Milton Academy	USHS	24	5	20	25	24	—	—	—	—	—
2012–13	Yale University	ECAC	37	0	7	7	32	—	—	—	—	—
2013–14	Yale University	ECAC	33	4	7	11	30	—	—	—	—	—
2014–15	Yale University	ECAC	33	6	15	21	31	—	—	—	—	—
2015–16	Yale University	ECAC	30	4	8	12	41	—	—	—	—	—
2015–16	Providence Bruins	AHL	5	1	0	1	4	—	—	—	—	—
2016–17	Providence Bruins	AHL	59	4	9	13	30	3	0	0	0	4
2016–17	Boston Bruins	NHL	3	0	0	0	0	—	—	—	—	—
2017–18	Providence Bruins	AHL	43	2	6	8	16	—	—	—	—	—
2017–18	Boston Bruins	NHL	8	0	0	0	0	—	—	—	—	—
2017–18	New York Rangers	NHL	22	0	3	3	6	—	—	—	—	—
2018–19	Hartford Wolf Pack	AHL	47	3	8	11	64	—	—	—	—	—
2019–20	San Antonio Rampage	AHL	5	0	0	0	6	—	—	—	—	—
2019–20	Springfield Thunderbirds	AHL	20	3	3	6	4	—	—	—	—	—
2020–21	Hershey Bears	AHL	26	1	3	4	33	—	—	—	—	—
NHL totals			33	0	3	3	6	—	—	—	—	—

== Awards and honors ==
Award	Year
College
All-Ivy League Second Team	2013–14
All-Ivy League First Team	2014–15
ECAC Hockey Best Defensive Defenseman	2014–15
All-ECAC Hockey First All-Star Team	2014–15
NCAA (East) First All-American Team	2014–15
All-Ivy League First Team	2015–16

Awards and achievements
Preceded by Shayne Gostisbehere; Dennis Robertson	ECAC Hockey Best Defensive Defenseman; 2014–15; 2015–16	Succeeded by James de Haas
