= 1980–81 Yale Bulldogs men's ice hockey season =

NCAA ice hockey team season

Ivy League Champions
- Conference: 9th ECAC Hockey
- Home ice: Ingalls Rink

Record
- Overall: 13–12–1 (7–2–1)
- Home: 7–2–1
- Road: 5–9–0
- Neutral: 1–1–0

Coaches and captains
- Head coach: Tim Taylor
- Assistant coaches: Bob Richardson; Ben Smith
- Captain: Doug Tingey

The 1980–81 Yale Bulldogs men's ice hockey team represented Yale University in the 1980–81 NCAA Division I men's ice hockey season. The team is coached by Tim Taylor, his fifth season behind the bench at Yale. The Bulldogs play their home games at Ingalls Rink on the campus of Yale University, competing in the ECAC.

The Bulldogs posted a regular season record of 13 wins, 12 losses, and 1 tie. Despite finishing 2nd in the Ivy Region of the ECAC Conference, Yale didn't qualify for the postseason.

== Offseason ==
Five Senior Bulldogs graduated in May: Captain Gary Lawerence – F, Keith Allain – G, Steve Harrington – D, Wally Row – F, and Gavin Thurston – F

On June 11, forward Bob Brooke was drafted 75th overall by the St. Louis Blues in the 1980 NHL entry draft.

Senior defensemen Doug Tingey was named Captain for the 1980–81 season.

== 1980–81 Roster ==
=== Departures from 1979–1980 team ===
- Gary Lawerence, F – Graduation
- Keith Allain, G – Graduation
- Steve Harrington, D – Graduation
- Wally Row, F – Graduation
- Gavin Thurston, F – Graduation

=== 1980–81 Bulldogs ===
No.	Nat.	Player	Class	Pos	Height	Weight	DoB	Hometown	Previous team	NHL rights
		Bob Brooke	Sophomore	F	6' 2" (1.88 m)	205 lb (93 kg)	1960-12-18	Acton, Massachusetts		STL, 75th overall 1980
		John Meehan	Junior	D	5' 10" (1.78 m)	175 lb (79 kg)	1958-04-10	North Scituate, Rhode Island		—
		Bill Nichols	Sophomore	D	6' 2" (1.88 m)	195 lb (88 kg)	1961-06-29	Glen Head, New York		—
		Daniel Poliziani	Junior	F	5' 10" (1.78 m)	180 lb (82 kg)	1959-03-05	Burlington, Ontario	Mount Hamilton A's (OPJHL)	—

=== Coaches ===
Name	Position	Seasons Coaching at Yale University	Alma mater
Tim Taylor	Head Coach	5	Harvard University (1963)
Bob Richardson	Assistant coach	2	Providence College (1975)
Ben Smith	Assistant coach	4	Harvard University (1968)

=== Staff ===
Name	Position	Seasons Staffing at Yale University
Edward Maturo	Equipment Manager	3
Christopher Carosa	Student manager	2

== Standings ==
- 1980–81 ECAC Hockey standings
  	Conference							Overall					
  	GP	W	L	T	Pct.	GF	GA	GP	W	L	T	GF	GA
  East Region
  Boston College	22	13	6	3	.659	85	72	31	20	8	3	126	100
  Maine	21	12	9	0	.571	101	93	34	23	11	0	197	147
  Northeastern	21	12	9	0	.571	118	104	26	13	13	0	140	139
  Providence*	22	12	9	1	.568	106	90	33	17	15	1	165	143
  New Hampshire	24	13	10	1	.563	128	100	33	19	13	1	166	129
  Boston University	22	10	12	0	.455	87	88	29	14	15	0	115	116
  West Region
  Clarkson†	20	17	2	1	.875	119	65	37	26	7	4	202	119
  Colgate	20	12	7	1	.625	99	84	35	21	12	2	194	150
  Rensselaer	21	10	11	0	.476	98	83	29	16	13	0	158	118
  St. Lawrence	22	9	12	1	.432	77	87	33	15	16	2	137	126
  Vermont	22	4	16	2	.227	81	114	34	9	23	2	136	173
  Ivy Region
  Cornell	22	12	9	1	.568	95	79	31	19	11	1	144	110
  Yale	21	11	9	1	.548	96	101	26	13	12	1	127	137
  Princeton	21	10	11	0	.476	78	99	25	12	13	0	93	111
  Harvard	21	8	12	1	.405	79	98	26	11	14	1	103	119
  Dartmouth	22	8	14	0	.364	87	115	26	10	16	0	100	138
  Brown	22	3	18	1	.159	67	125	26	5	20	1	83	144
  Independent
  Army^	-	-	-	-	-	-	-	35	21	13	1	230	160
  Championship: Providence † indicates conference regular season champion * indicates conference tournament champion^ Army had been accepted into ECAC Hockey but had not begun a conference schedule

== Schedule ==
Date	Opponent^{#}	Rank^{#}	Site	Result	Record
Exhibition
December 31	Vasby-Sweden*		Ingalls Rink • New Haven, Connecticut	W 4–3	2–5–0 (1–2–0)
Regular season
November 25	vs. Merrimack*		Ingalls Rink • New Haven, Connecticut	W 12–3	1–0–0 (0-0-0)
November 30	at Colgate		Starr Arena • Hamilton, New York	L 3–8	1–1–0 (0–1–0)
December 6	St. Lawrence		Ingalls Rink • New Haven, Connecticut	L 2–3 ^{OT}	1–2–0 (0–2–0)
December 10	at Boston University		Walter Brown Arena • Boston, Massachusetts	L 3–5	1–3–0 (0–3–0)
December 13	at Princeton		Hobey Baker Memorial Rink • Princeton, New Jersey	W 5–2	2–3–0 (1–3–0)
December 28	at Wisconsin*		Dane County Coliseum • Madison, Wisconsin	L 5–10	2–4–0 (1–3–0)
December 29	at Wisconsin*		Dane County Coliseum • Madison, Wisconsin	L 1–12	2–5–0 (1–3–0)
January 2	vs. Toronto*		New Haven Coliseum • New Haven, Connecticut (Yale Invitational)	L 3–6	2–6–0 (1–3–0)
January 3	vs. Vermont*		New Haven Coliseum • New Haven, Connecticut (Yale Invitational)	W 7–2	3–6–0 (1–3–0)
January 6	Clarkson		Ingalls Rink • New Haven, Connecticut	L 5–6	3–7–0 (1–4–0)
January 10	Brown		Ingalls Rink • New Haven, Connecticut	W 8–6	4–7–0 (2–4–0)
January 17	at Vermont		Gutterson Fieldhouse • Burlington, Vermont	W 7–4	5–7–0 (3–4–0)
January 20	at Boston College		McHugh Forum • Chestnut Hill, Massachusetts	L 1–6	5–8–0 (3–5–0)
January 24	at Dartmouth		Thompson Arena • Hanover, New Hampshire	W 5–4 ^{OT}	6–8–0 (4–5–0)
January 27	RPI		Ingalls Rink • New Haven, Connecticut	W 4–3	7–8–0 (5–5–0)
January 30	Cornell		Ingalls Rink • New Haven, Connecticut	W 7–3	8–8–0 (6–5–0)
January 31	Princeton		Ingalls Rink • New Haven, Connecticut	W 4–3 ^{OT}	9–8–0 (7–5–0)
February 6	at Maine		Alfond Arena • Orono, Maine	L 4–5 ^{OT}	9–9–0 (7–6–0)
February 7	at New Hampshire		Snively Arena • Durham, New Hampshire	L 2–12	9–10–0 (7–7–0)
February 14	at Harvard		Bright Hockey Center • Allston, Massachusetts	L 2–6	9–11–0 (7–8–0)
February 17	Northeastern		Ingalls Rink • New Haven, Connecticut	W 7–5	10–9–0 (8–8–0)
February 21	Harvard		Ingalls Rink • New Haven, Connecticut	T 5–5 ^{OT}	10–9–1 (8–8–1)
February 24	at Brown		Meehan Auditorium • Providence, Rhode Island	W 6–4	11–9–1 (9–8–1)
February 27	at Providence		Schneider Arena • Providence, Rhode Island	W 4–3	12–9–1 (10–8–1)
March 4	Dartmouth		Ingalls Rink • New Haven, Connecticut	W 10–3	13–9–1 (11–8–1)
March 7	at Cornell		Lynah Rink • Ithaca, New York	L 1–5	13–12–1 (11–9–1)
*Non-conference game. ^{#}Rankings from USCHO.com Poll.

== Statistics ==
Player	POS	Age	GP	G	A	Pts	PIM
Bob Brooke	F	19	27	12	30	42	59
Joe Gagliardi	F		27	17	21	38	32
Dan Poliziani	F	21	26	17	21	38	14
Dan Brugman	F		27	17	16	33	18
Jim Murphy	F		27	5	19	24	18
Ed Kilroy	F		27	6	17	23	56
Mark Crerar	F		27	14	7	21	8
Jim Steiner	F		27	9	9	18	16
Paul Castraberti	F		14	4	13	17	6
Bill Nichols	D	19	27	4	13	17	10
David Williams	F		27	8	7	15	14
Matt Bohan	F		27	6	5	11	14
John Meehan	D	22	27	1	9	10	4
Bill Thurston	D		27	0	10	10	31
Blair Wheeler	D		25	3	6	9	50
Dave Tewksbury	D		27	0	6	6	18
George Minowada	F		17	2	1	3	2
Doug Tingey	D		13	0	3	3	30
John Weber	D		23	2	0	2	10
Matt Baab	D		9	0	2	2	0
Ted Lowe	G		1	0	0	0	0
Paul Tortorella	G		3	0	0	0	0
Ken Shaw	G		9	0	0	0	0
Mark Rodrigues	G		24	0	0	0	0
	Team		27	127	215	342	410
