= Christopher Carosa =

American journalist

Board Member of the Town of Mendon
- In office January 1, 1992 – December 31, 1995

Personal details
- Born: July 15, 1960 (age 65) Buffalo, New York, USA
- Spouse: Betsy Kay Lundell (m. 1991)
- Children: daughter Cesidia Maria, daughter Catarina Lena, and son Peter Samuel
- Education: Yale University (B.S., Physics and Astronomy, 1982); University of Rochester (M.B.A., Finance and Marketing, 1991)
- Occupation: Newspaper Publisher, Author, Journalist, Speaker, Investment Adviser
- Website: chriscarosa.com

Christopher Carosa (born July 15, 1960) is an American author, journalist, and investment adviser. He is a senior contributor to Forbes.com, chief contributing editor of FiducaryNews.com, the publisher of the Mendon-Honeoye Falls-Lima Sentinel, and is a weekly and monthly columnist for ALM's BenefitsPRO, an online news site, and Benefits Selling, a monthly print magazine. Carosa served as President of the National Society of Newspaper Columnists from 2019 to 2020 and is a current board member of the New York Press Association.

== Early life ==
Christopher Carosa was born in Buffalo, New York, at Mercy Hospital, July 15, 1960, the first child of Patsy Dominic Carosa and Lena Butera. His grandparents were native Italians, and played a large role in his approach to business and life. His book, "A Pizza the Action", recounts how his family, both in the home and at their place of business, helped shape his outlook on life, as well as the lesson his grandparents shared about the business world.

== Education ==
Carosa attended elementary schools in the Frontier Central School District in Hamburg, New York, a southern suburb of Buffalo, until the family moved to Chili, New York, a suburb of Rochester. There he attended elementary, junior, and senior high school in the Gates Chili Central School District. While attending high school, he played football, was captain of the Chess Team, and served as concert master of the orchestra. Carosa attended Yale University in 1978–1982, graduating with a B.S. (Intensive) in Physics and Astronomy. During this time, he was the General Manager of the Yale Bulldogs men's ice hockey team, being persuaded by then-player and now the team's Head Coach, Keith Allain, and roommate Daniel Poliziani, who eventually became captain of the team and later served one year as interim Head Coach of the Bulldogs. Carosa was also a popular disc jockey and sports broadcaster on the college's AM Radio Station. Carosa received an M.B.A. in Finance and Marketing from University of Rochester in 1991.

== Career ==
Upon graduating from college, Carosa was hired by Manning & Napier Advisors, Inc., a registered investment adviser located in Rochester, New York. As his position there initially focused on information technology, he served as president for local computer user groups. In his capacity as president of computerAccess, a consortium of all local computer groups, he helped organize a Computer Fair that attracted more than 2,000 people. His work in artificial intelligence at Manning & Napier was profiled as part of a cover story in the June 1987 issue of Wall Street Computer Review. Later at Manning & Napier, he assisted in the creation of the firm's mutual funds, developed the firm's custodial operations division, and started their affiliated trust company. In 1989, Carosa co-founded the Mendon-Honeoye Falls-Lima Sentinel with Shirley Arena and severed as co-publisher until he sold his shares to Arena in the mid-1990s. Using the proceeds of that sale, he left Manning & Napier to start Carosa, Stanton Asset Management LLC, a SEC Registered Investment Adviser, where he continues to serve as president. In 1997, he created Bullfinch Fund, Inc., a family of no-load flexible mutual funds, where he continues to serve as chairman of the board, president, and portfolio manager, and in 2000, Carosa created Independent Fiduciary Consultants, a division of Carosa, Stanton Asset Management LLC that serves 401(k) plan sponsors. Carosa started FiduciaryNews.com, an online trade journal/news site, in September 2009, where he continues to serve as Chief Contributing Editor. In December 2015, Carosa reprised his role as publisher of the Mendon-Honeoye Falls-Lima Sentinel when his wife's publishing company, Pandamensional Solutions, Inc., acquired the paper. Following the released of his 2018 book, Hamburger Dreams: How Classic Crime Solving Techniques Helped Crack the Case of America's Greatest Culinary Mystery, Carosa has been making press appearances across the United States. Some media members have referred to him as a "Hamburger Historian" due to his extensive research in the early history of the hamburger in America.

== Honors ==
In 2005, the Journal of Financial Planning named Carosa as the winner of their annual call-for-papers competition under the "academic" category. His paper introduced the "snapshot-in-time" anomaly as it pertains to measuring investment performance. In 2006, Allan Roth formally challenged and claimed there was a math error, but the Appeal Committee did not find enough evidence in their review to recommend retracting and stated that it "came down to methodology rather than mathematics." After further inquires made by Journal and Financial Planning Association staff and no follow-up research provided by Carosa, the paper was retracted by the Journal in May 2007 for possible flaws.

Carosa was inducted into the Gates Chili Central School District Alumni Hall of Fame in 2009.

The New York Press Association (NYPA) recognized Carosa as a 2017 Honorable Mention winner in the Editorial Writing category for his weekly column in the Mendon-Honeoye Falls-Lima Sentinel. The judges said Carosa's works "distinguished themselves with their strong voice and writing, their depth of knowledge and their focus on issues of local importance." In 2018, Carosa was again honored by the NYPA, this time as an Honorable Mention winner in the Best News or Feature Series category. His multi-month series, titled "Hamburger Helper," earned praise from the judges who said, "the topic was entertaining - I’ve never read a story about the history of the hamburger." The NYPA awarded Carosa first place for best online news project or presentation in their 2020 Better Newspaper Contest. In response to the COVID-19 pandemic, Carosa began producing a weekly video series, titled "Mayors & Supervisors Update," in which he interviewed local government officials to provide the community with relevant up-to-date information regarding efforts and challenges during the pandemic. Judges said, "It had the right number of participants, the pace was brisk, the questions and answers were relevant, and it achieved what it wanted to do in under 30 minutes. Well done."

In May 2021, Carosa's ebook edition of his 2018 book, Hamburger Dreams: How Classic Crime Solving Techniques Helped Crack the Case of America's Greatest Culinary Mystery, achieved the number one ranking on Amazon's New Releases in the Historical Essays category.

== Published works ==
Carosa has authored seven books. He often writes about his home-region, Greater Western New York, as well as the financial industry with a particular focus on retirement and fiduciary issues.

- Due Diligence: The Individual Trustee's Guide to Selecting and Monitoring a Professional Investment Adviser, Christopher Carosa, ARDMAN Regional (1999), ISBN 0-9669745-0-6
- 401(k) Fiduciary Solutions: Expert Guidance for 401(k) Plan Sponsors on how to Effectively and Safely Manage Plan Compliance and Investments by Sharing the Fiduciary Burden with Experienced Professionals, Christopher Carosa, Pandamensional Solutions, Inc. (2012) ISBN 1-938465-00-8
- 50 Hidden Gems of Greater Western New York: A handbook for those too proud to believe "wide right" and "no goal" define us, Christopher Carosa, Pandamensional Solutions, Inc. (2012) ISBN 1-938465-01-6
- A Pizza The Action: Everything I Ever Learned About Business I Learned by Working in a Pizza Stand at the Erie County Fair, Christopher Carosa, Pandamensional Solutions, Inc. (2014) ISBN 1-938465-02-4
- Hey! What's My Number?: How to Improve The Odds You Will Retire in Comfort, Christopher Carosa, Pandamensional Solutions, Inc. (2014) ISBN 1-938465-03-2
- From Cradle to Retirement: The Child IRA: How to start a newborn on the road to comfortable retirement while still in a cozy cradle, Christopher Carosa, Pandamensional Solutions, Inc. (2018) ISBN 1-938465-05-9
- Hamburger Dreams: How Classic Crime Solving Techniques Helped Crack the Case of America's Greatest Culinary Mystery, Christopher Carosa, Pandamensional Solutions, Inc. (2018) ISBN 1-938465-06-7
