= Mendon-Honeoye Falls-Lima Sentinel =

- Type: Weekly newspaper
- Format: Broadsheet
- Owner: Pandamensional Solutions Inc.
- Founder(s): Shirley Arena; Christopher Carosa
- Publisher: Christopher Carosa
- President: Betsy Carosa
- Editor: Donna Mackenzie
- Launched: March 23, 1989; 37 years ago
- Language: English
- Headquarters: 3909 Rush Mendon Road; Mendon, New York 14506; United States
- City: Mendon, NY
- Country: United States
- ISSN: 1049-4960
- OCLC number: 19507534
- Website: MHFLSentinel.com
- Free online archives: NYSHistoricNewspapers.org

The Mendon-Honeoye Falls-Lima Sentinel (The Sentinel) is a weekly newspaper serving the greater southern Monroe County, New York area. Its offices are located at 3909 Rush Mendon Road in Mendon, New York, The Sentinel is published by Sentinel Publications, a division of Pandamensional Solutions Inc. The first issue of the Mendon-Honeoye Falls-Lima Sentinel was published on March 23, 1989 and has been published weekly on Thursdays since. The Sentinel is a member of the New York Press Association.

== History ==
Founded in March 1989 as the Mendon-Honeoye Falls-Lima Sentinel by Shirley Arena and Christopher Carosa, the paper took the place of the Honeoye Falls Times and Lima Recorder both of which ceased publication on January 12, 1989 and were merged with the Honeoye Lake Courier and Livonia Gazette to form the Town & Country Gazette. The Honeoye Falls Times had served the Mendon-Honeoye Falls area since 1888, while the Lima Recorder had served the Lima area since 1869. The Town & Country Gazette abruptly stopped publication on March 23, 1989 when its owner, Downtown Magazine, Inc., filed Chapter 11. Richard A. Gagliano, who published the Town & Country Gazette, had previously purchased the Honeoye Falls Times, Lima Recorder, and other area newspaper from Dorotha Bradley in 1987.

In mid-January 1989, Arena, who had spent five years working for the Honeoye Falls Times, and Carosa, who previously published two newsletters and was currently a Managing Director at Manning and Napier Advisers, Inc., met to discuss forming a new newspaper to replace the now folded Honeoye Falls Times and Lima Recorder. In a little more than eight weeks, the two founders went from an idea to setting up a full-fledged publishing outfit using what was then new desktop publishing technology, making the Mendon-Honeoye Falls-Lima Sentinel one of the first print papers to use such an advanced electronic system. The first issue of the Sentinel was eight pages and was mailed for free to five thousand households in the Honeoye Falls-Lima Central School District. Arena wrote the "Heard on the Street" column and Carosa, who, ironically once led his high school classmates to walk out of their Advanced Placement English class in an impromptu "strike", penned a "homespun" column called "The Carosa Commentary". According to published reports, readers were delighted with this first issue: "The response was phenomenal," Carosa was quoted as saying, "People were writing notes on their checks saying 'great idea.' People were calling us for ads." At the time the annual subscription rate was $12.50 a year and individual issues cost 35 cents. The original advisory board for Sentinel Publications was Robert Borsching Sr., Leslie Edgecomb III, Judith Farrar, Elliot Frank, Dr. James Frenck, Rev. Charles Latus, J. Arnold Leckie, Everett Lewis, Johanna O'Brien, Pat Reynolds, Jim Robeson, Ken Schreib, John Stanwix, Richard Walker, Rick West, Pete Yendell, and Robert Young.

In the mid-1990s, Carosa sold his share of the Sentinel to Arena, who continued to operate the newspaper until her death in April 2009. From 2009 to 2015, Michael Shellman, Arena's grandson, owned and operated the weekly newspaper. In December 2015, Pandamensional Solutions Inc., a publishing firm located in Mendon, purchased the Mendon-Honeoye Falls-Lima Sentinel and began operations in January 2016. With the exception of Shellman, the current staff was retained. Betsy Carosa, the wife of Christopher Carosa, is the President/Owner of Pandamensional Solutions, Inc. and the owner of the Sentinel. Christopher Carosa returned as Publisher, although he continues to manage and operate Carosa Stanton Asset Management, LLC and the Bullfinch Fund, firms he started using seed money from the proceeds of his original sale of the Sentinel to Arena.

== Coverage ==
Coverage of the Mendon-Honeoye Falls-Lima Sentinel in Monroe, Livingston, and Ontario Counties, in New York. Towns and villages where the Sentinel is an official paper. Towns and villages also served by the Sentinel.

The Mendon-Honeoye Falls-Lima Sentinel serves the areas of Mendon, Honeoye Falls, Lima, Avon, Bloomfield, Henrietta, Pittsford, Rush, Scottsville, Victor, Wheatland, and West Bloomfield. The Sentinel is the official paper for the Honeoye Falls-Lima Central School District, Town of Lima, Town of Mendon, Town of Pittsford, Town of Rush, Town of Wheatland, Village of Honeoye Falls, Village of Lima, and Village of Scottsville. The Sentinel is also listed as one of only eight newspapers recognized by Monroe County as a designated newspaper for proof of publication.

== Prices ==
The Mendon-Honeoye Falls-Lima Sentinel prices are: $1 newsstand, $40 annual print subscription (instate), and $50 annual print subscription (out of state).
