= 1981 ECAC Hockey men's ice hockey tournament =

1981 ECAC Men's ice hockey tournament
- Dates: March 10–14, 1981
- Teams: 8
- Finals site: Boston Garden; Boston, Massachusetts
- Champions: Providence (2nd title)
- Winning coach: Lou Lamoriello (1st title)
- MVP: Kurt Kleinendorst (Providence)
- ECAC Men's Ice Hockey Tournaments

The 1981 ECAC Hockey Men's Ice Hockey Tournament was the 20th tournament in league history. It was played between March 10 and March 14, 1981. Quarterfinal games were played at home team campus sites, while the 'final four' games were played at the Boston Garden in Boston, Massachusetts. By winning the tournament, Providence received the ECAC's automatic bid to the 1981 NCAA Division I Men's Ice Hockey Tournament.

== Format ==
The tournament featured three rounds of play, all of which were single-elimination. The three teams that were division champions automatically qualified for the tournament while the remaining five seeds were given to the teams with the highest winning percentage. The top four seeds were given out to the three division champions and the top qualifier and assorted based upon winning percentage. The remaining four seeds were assigned to the other qualifiers and assorted based upon winning percentage. In the quarterfinals the first seed and eighth seed, the second seed and seventh seed, the third seed and sixth seed and the fourth seed and fifth seed played against one another. In the semifinals, the highest seed plays the lowest remaining seed while the two remaining teams play with the winners advancing to the championship game and the losers advancing to the third place game. The tournament champion receives an automatic bid to the 1981 NCAA Division I Men's Ice Hockey Tournament.

== Conference standings ==
Note: GP = Games played; W = Wins; L = Losses; T = Ties; Pct. = Winning percentage; GF = Goals for; GA = Goals against

1980–81 ECAC Hockey standings
	Conference							Overall					
	GP	W	L	T	Pct.	GF	GA	GP	W	L	T	GF	GA
East Region
Boston College	22	13	6	3	.659	85	72	31	20	8	3	126	100
Maine	21	12	9	0	.571	101	93	34	23	11	0	197	147
Northeastern	21	12	9	0	.571	118	104	26	13	13	0	140	139
Providence*	22	12	9	1	.568	106	90	33	17	15	1	165	143
New Hampshire	24	13	10	1	.563	128	100	33	19	13	1	166	129
Boston University	22	10	12	0	.455	87	88	29	14	15	0	115	116
West Region
Clarkson†	20	17	2	1	.875	119	65	37	26	7	4	202	119
Colgate	20	12	7	1	.625	99	84	35	21	12	2	194	150
Rensselaer	21	10	11	0	.476	98	83	29	16	13	0	158	118
St. Lawrence	22	9	12	1	.432	77	87	33	15	16	2	137	126
Vermont	22	4	16	2	.227	81	114	34	9	23	2	136	173
Ivy Region
Cornell	22	12	9	1	.568	95	79	31	19	11	1	144	110
Yale	21	11	9	1	.548	96	101	26	13	12	1	127	137
Princeton	21	10	11	0	.476	78	99	25	12	13	0	93	111
Harvard	21	8	12	1	.405	79	98	26	11	14	1	103	119
Dartmouth	22	8	14	0	.364	87	115	26	10	16	0	100	138
Brown	22	3	18	1	.159	67	125	26	5	20	1	83	144
Independent
Army^	-	-	-	-	-	-	-	35	21	13	1	230	160
Championship: Providence † indicates conference regular season champion * indicates conference tournament champion^ Army had been accepted into ECAC Hockey but had not begun a conference schedule

== Bracket ==
Teams are reseeded after the first round

Quarterfinals; March 10
1	Clarkson	3
8	New Hampshire	2
2	Boston College	2
7	Providence	5
3	Colgate	5
6	Northeastern	3
4	Cornell	7
5	Maine	4

Semifinals; March 13
1	Clarkson	3
7	Providence	4*
3	Colgate	3
4	Cornell	4

Championship; March 14
4	Cornell	4
7	Providence	8
Third Place
1	Clarkson	3*
3	Colgate	3

Note: * denotes overtime period(s)

=== Quarterfinals ===
==== (1) Clarkson vs. (8) New Hampshire ====
March 10	Clarkson	3 – 2	New Hampshire	Walker Arena

==== (2) Boston College vs. (7) Providence ====
March 10	Boston College	2 – 5	Providence	McHugh Forum

==== (3) Colgate vs. (6) Northeastern ====
March 10	Colgate	5 – 3	Northeastern	Starr Rink

==== (4) Cornell vs. (5) Maine ====
March 10	Cornell	7 – 4	Maine	Lynah Rink

=== Semifinals ===
==== (1) Clarkson vs. (7) Providence ====
March 13	Clarkson	3 – 4	OT	Providence	Boston Garden

==== (3) Colgate vs. (4) Cornell ====
March 13	Colgate	3 – 4	Cornell	Boston Garden

=== Third Place ===
==== (1) Clarkson vs. (3) Colgate ====
March 14	Clarkson	3 – 3	OT	Colgate	Boston Garden

=== Championship ===
==== (4) Cornell vs. (7) Providence ====
March 14	Cornell	4 – 8	Providence	Boston Garden

== Tournament awards ==
=== All-Tournament Team ===
None

=== MOP ===
- Kurt Kleinendorst (Providence)
