= Jeff Hamilton (ice hockey) =

American ice hockey player (born 1977)

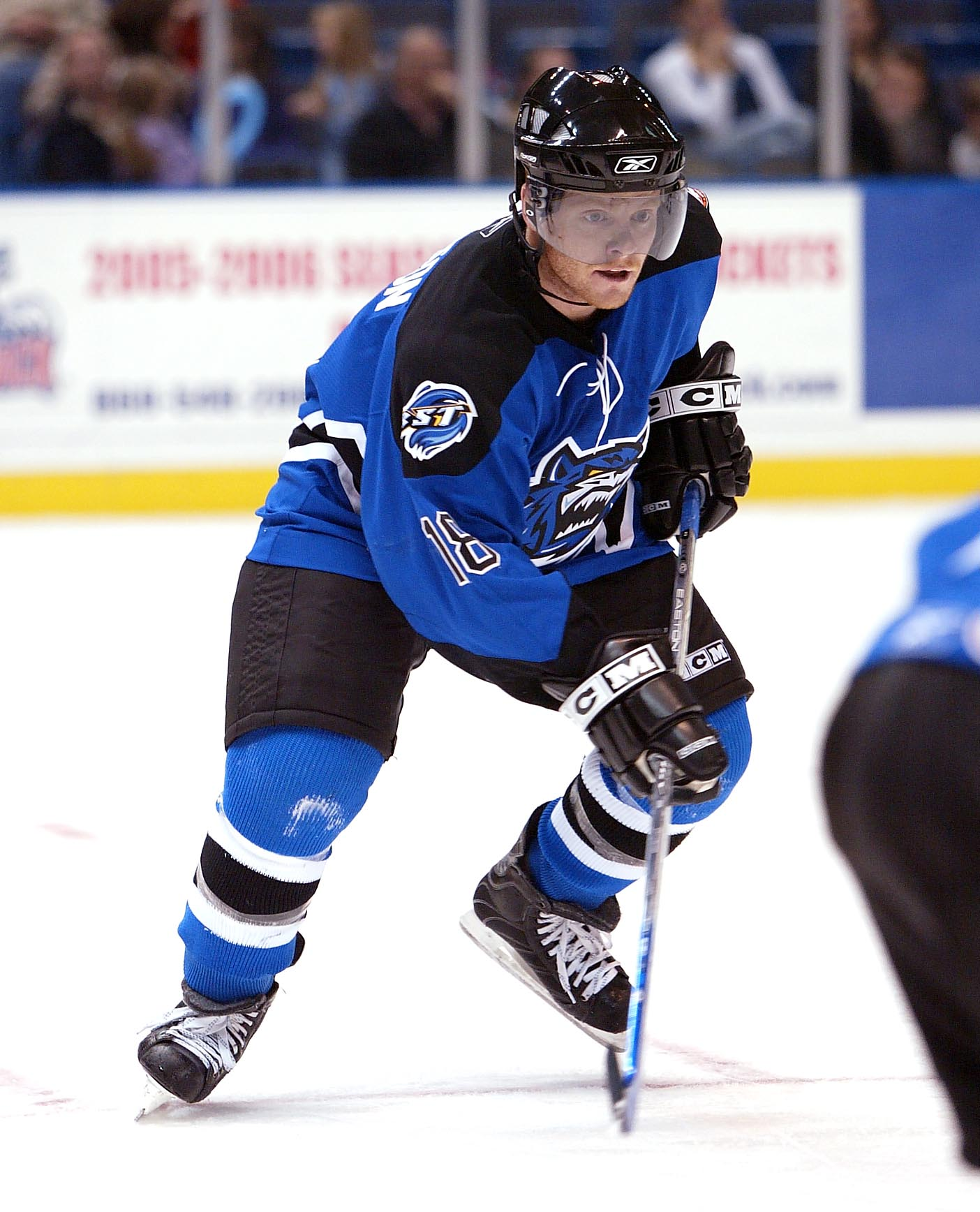
- Hamilton with the Bridgeport Sound Tigers in 2005
- Born: September 4, 1977 (age 49) Englewood, Ohio, U.S.
- Height: 5 ft 10 in (178 cm)
- Weight: 180 lb (82 kg; 12 st 12 lb)
- Position: Right wing
- Shot: Right
- Played for: Oulun Kärpät; New York Islanders; Ak Bars Kazan; Chicago Blackhawks; Carolina Hurricanes; Toronto Maple Leafs; HC Lugano; HIFK
- Current ECAC Hockey coach: Yale University Bulldogs
- National team: United States
- NHL draft: Undrafted
- Playing career: 2001–2011

Jeffrey Hamilton (born September 4, 1977) is Malcolm G. Chace Head Coach of Men’s Hockey at Yale University and American former professional ice hockey forward. Hamilton's wife, Jane, is sister of former U.S. women's ice hockey player Helen Resor.

== Playing career ==
Hamilton spent his high school career playing for Avon Old Farms and his college career playing for Yale University where he tallied 80 goals and 174 points in 127 contests, setting the school's all-time scoring mark. In 2001, he signed with Kärpät of the SM-liiga and played there for one season before being signed by the New York Islanders. He played with their American Hockey League (AHL) affiliate, the Bridgeport Sound Tigers, for two seasons before signing with the Hartford Wolf Pack, also of the AHL, in 2004.

In 2005, he started the season playing with Ak Bars Kazan of the Russian Superleague (RSL), but left after playing only eight games. He was then re-signed by the Islanders and sent back to the Sound Tigers. Jeff scored his first NHL goal on December 17, 2005, against David Aebischer and the Colorado Avalanche during an Islanders 5–4 win. It was his second career game.

In the summer of 2006, he signed as a free agent with the Chicago Blackhawks. After scoring a career-high 18 goals and 39 points, he signed as a free agent with the Carolina Hurricanes on July 1, 2007. However, in July 2008, he was bought out of his contract and made a free agent.

On September 3, 2008, Hamilton signed with the Chicago Wolves of the AHL.

On March 5, 2009, Hamilton became a member of the Toronto Maple Leafs after the team bought his contract from the Wolves.

On August 5, 2009, Hamilton left North America and signed abroad for HC Lugano of the Swiss National League A. After a season with Lugano, Hamilton returned to familiar stomping grounds in Finland in playing with HIFK of the SM-liiga for the 2010–11 season. His career ended in an injury just before playoffs, but he won the Finnish championship with HIFK after producing at a point-per-game ratio in the regular season.

== Career statistics ==
=== Regular season and playoffs ===
			Regular season					Playoffs
Season	Team	League	GP	G	A	Pts	PIM	GP	G	A	Pts	PIM
1993–94	Avon Old Farms	HS-Prep
1994–95	Avon Old Farms	HS-Prep
1995–96	Avon Old Farms	HS-Prep	24	29	23	52		—	—	—	—	—
1996–97	Yale University	ECAC	31	10	13	23	26	—	—	—	—	—
1997–98	Yale University	ECAC	33	27	20	47	28	—	—	—	—	—
1998–99	Yale University	ECAC	30	20	28	48	51	—	—	—	—	—
1999–2000	Yale University	ECAC	2	0	1	1	0	—	—	—	—	—
2000–01	Yale University	ECAC	31	23	32	55	39	—	—	—	—	—
2001–02	Kärpät	SM-l	39	18	15	33	16	3	0	0	0	0
2002–03	Bridgeport Sound Tigers	AHL	67	22	16	38	35	9	3	3	6	0
2003–04	Bridgeport Sound Tigers	AHL	67	43	25	68	26	7	4	0	4	4
2003–04	New York Islanders	NHL	1	0	0	0	0	—	—	—	—	—
2004–05	Hartford Wolf Pack	AHL	60	23	29	52	32	6	4	3	7	0
2005–06	AK Bars Kazan	RSL	8	0	0	0	16	—	—	—	—	—
2005–06	Bridgeport Sound Tigers	AHL	39	24	25	49	28	—	—	—	—	—
2005–06	New York Islanders	NHL	13	2	6	8	8	—	—	—	—	—
2006–07	Chicago Blackhawks	NHL	70	18	21	39	22	—	—	—	—	—
2007–08	Carolina Hurricanes	NHL	58	9	15	24	10	—	—	—	—	—
2007–08	Albany River Rats	AHL	9	3	6	9	6	—	—	—	—	—
2008–09	Chicago Wolves	AHL	50	16	37	53	18	—	—	—	—	—
2008–09	Toronto Maple Leafs	NHL	15	3	3	6	4	—	—	—	—	—
2009–10	HC Lugano	NLA	46	22	24	46	28	—	—	—	—	—
2010–11	HIFK	SM-l	33	14	19	33	38	—	—	—	—	—
AHL totals			292	131	139	270	145	22	11	6	17	4
NHL totals			157	32	45	77	44	—	—	—	—	—

=== International ===
Year	Team	Event	Result	GP	G	A	Pts	PIM
2004	United States	WC	3rd place, bronze medalist(s)	6	1	0	1	2
Senior totals				6	1	0	1	2

== Awards and honors ==
Award	Year
All-ECAC Hockey Rookie Team	1996–97
All-ECAC Hockey First Team	1997–98
AHCA East Second-Team All-American	1997–98
All-ECAC Hockey First Team	1998–99
AHCA East Second-Team All-American	1998–99
All-ECAC Hockey First Team	2000–01
AHCA East First-Team All-American	2000–01
AHL First All-Star Team	2003–04
AHL Willie Marshall Award	2003–04
SM-liiga Kanada-malja	2010–11
