= Bob Brooke =

American professional ice hockey forward

- Born: December 18, 1960 (age 65) Melrose, Massachusetts, U.S.
- Height: 6 ft 1 in (185 cm)
- Weight: 205 lb (93 kg; 14 st 9 lb)
- Position: Centre
- Shot: Right
- Played for: New York Rangers; Minnesota North Stars; New Jersey Devils
- National team: United States
- NHL draft: 75th overall, 1980; St. Louis Blues
- Playing career: 1983–1990

Robert Wesley Brooke (born December 18, 1960) is an American former professional ice hockey forward who played 447 games in the National Hockey League (NHL) with the New York Rangers, Minnesota North Stars, and New Jersey Devils between 1984 and 1990. Internationally Brooke played for the American national team at several tournaments, including the 1984 Winter Olympics and the 1984 and 1987 Canada Cups, as well as three World Championships.

== Playing career ==
Brooke was the first of the "AB Pros," the handful of NHL players that grew up through the Acton-Boxborough youth hockey program of the 1960s, 1970s, and 1980s (Tom Barrasso, Ted Crowley, Bob Sweeney, Ian Moran, and Jeff Norton). He graduated from Acton-Boxborough Regional High School in 1979. After graduation, Brooke played for the Yale University men's ice hockey team graduating in 1983. He played international hockey as a member of the United States national team at the 1984 Winter Olympics in Sarajevo. He also played baseball for Yale alongside future New York Mets' pitcher Ron Darling.

In the NHL, he played for the New York Rangers, Minnesota North Stars and New Jersey Devils. After joining the NHL, he also played for US team in the 1984 Canada Cup, 1985 and 1987 Ice Hockey World Championships as well as the 1987 Canada Cup.

After his playing career, he went to Harvard Business School for his MBA.

== Career statistics ==
=== Regular season and playoffs ===
			Regular season					Playoffs
Season	Team	League	GP	G	A	Pts	PIM	GP	G	A	Pts	PIM
1978–79	Acton-Boxborough Regional High School	HS-MA	—	—	—	—	—	—	—	—	—	—
1979–80	Yale University	ECAC	24	7	22	29	38	—	—	—	—	—
1980–81	Yale University	ECAC	27	12	30	42	59	—	—	—	—	—
1981–82	Yale University	ECAC	25	12	30	42	60	—	—	—	—	—
1982–83	Yale University	ECAC	25	10	30	40	48	—	—	—	—	—
1983–84	United States National Team	Intl	54	7	18	25	75	—	—	—	—	—
1983–84	New York Rangers	NHL	9	1	2	3	4	5	0	0	0	7
1984–85	New York Rangers	NHL	72	7	9	16	79	3	0	0	0	8
1985–86	New York Rangers	NHL	79	24	20	44	111	16	6	9	15	28
1986–87	New York Rangers	NHL	15	3	5	8	20	—	—	—	—	—
1986–87	Minnesota North Stars	NHL	65	10	18	28	78	—	—	—	—	—
1987–88	Minnesota North Stars	NHL	77	5	20	25	108	—	—	—	—	—
1988–89	Minnesota North Stars	NHL	57	7	9	16	57	5	3	0	3	2
1989–90	Minnesota North Stars	NHL	38	4	4	8	33	—	—	—	—	—
1989–90	New Jersey Devils	NHL	35	8	10	18	30	5	0	0	0	14
NHL totals			447	69	97	166	520	34	9	9	18	59

=== International ===
Year	Team	Event	GP	G	A	Pts	PIM
1980	United States	WJC	5	3	2	5	8
1983	United States	WC B	7	4	4	8	—
1984	United States	OG	6	1	1	2	10
1984	United States	CC	5	0	1	1	4
1985	United States	WC	10	0	1	1	14
1987	United States	WC	10	2	1	3	10
1987	United States	CC	5	1	0	1	4
Senior totals			43	8	8	16	—

== Awards and honors ==
Award	Year
All-ECAC Hockey First Team	1982–83
AHCA East All-American	1982–83
