= Yale Bulldogs men's ice hockey =

American university ice hockey team

- Current season
- University: Yale University
- Conference: ECAC Hockey
- Governing Body: NCAA
- First season: 1895–96; 131 years ago
- Head coach: Jeff Hamilton; 1st season, 0–0–0
- Captain(s): Rhys Bentham
- Arena: Ingalls Rink; New Haven, Connecticut
- Colors: Yale blue and White
- Fight song: Down the Field; Bull-Dog
- Mascot: Handsome Dan

NCAA tournament champions
- 2013

NCAA tournament Frozen Four
- 1952, 2013

NCAA tournament appearances
- 1952, 1998, 2009, 2010, 2011, 2013, 2015, 2016

Conference tournament champions
- ECAC: 2009, 2011

Conference regular season champions
- Pentagonal League: 1935, 1940, 1952; ECAC: 1998, 2009, 2010

Ivy League regular season champions
- 1981, 1985, 1992, 1998, 1999, 2001, 2007, 2009, 2010, 2011, 2013, 2015, 2016

Current uniform

The Yale Bulldogs men's ice hockey team represents Yale University in New Haven, Connecticut and is the oldest collegiate ice hockey team in the United States. The Bulldogs compete in the Ivy League and the ECAC Hockey League (ECACHL) and play their home games at Ingalls Rink, also called the Yale Whale. The current head coach is Jeff Hamilton, Yale College Class of 2001, who took over April 4, 2026. On April 13, 2013, the Bulldogs shut out Quinnipiac 4–0 to win their first NCAA Division I Championship.

== Team history ==
=== Origins: Malcolm Greene Chace ===
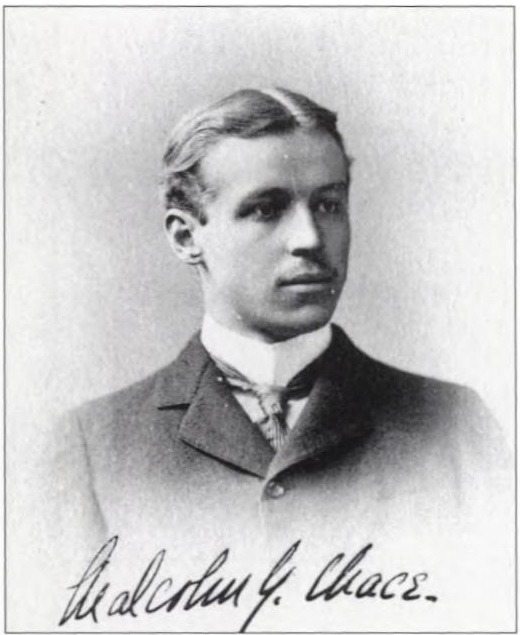
Malcolm Greene Chace

Financier Malcolm Greene Chace (Yale class of 1896) is credited with introducing ice hockey to the United States while a Yale student. Chace had been a tennis champion and avid player of ice polo, a game which predated hockey in the United States. In 1892, while competing in an international tennis tournament in Niagara Falls, New York, Chace was introduced to the game of ice hockey by members of Canada's Victoria Hockey Club. During the following Christmas break, Chace formed a team made up of Brown, Harvard, Cornell and Columbia students and played a ten-game schedule in Canada, with the goal of learning the Canadian game. After their tour, the students established hockey clubs at their respective schools.

Chace led the Yale team as captain in their game against Baltimore on February 14, 1896, winning 2–1. Over a century later in 1998, Yale established the position of Malcolm G. Chace Head Hockey Coach in his honor. A portrait of Chace hangs in The Schley Room at Ingalls Rink. The Malcolm G. Chace Award is given each year to the player who "best exemplifies leadership and the traditions of the sport at Yale".

=== Early history (1893–1963) ===
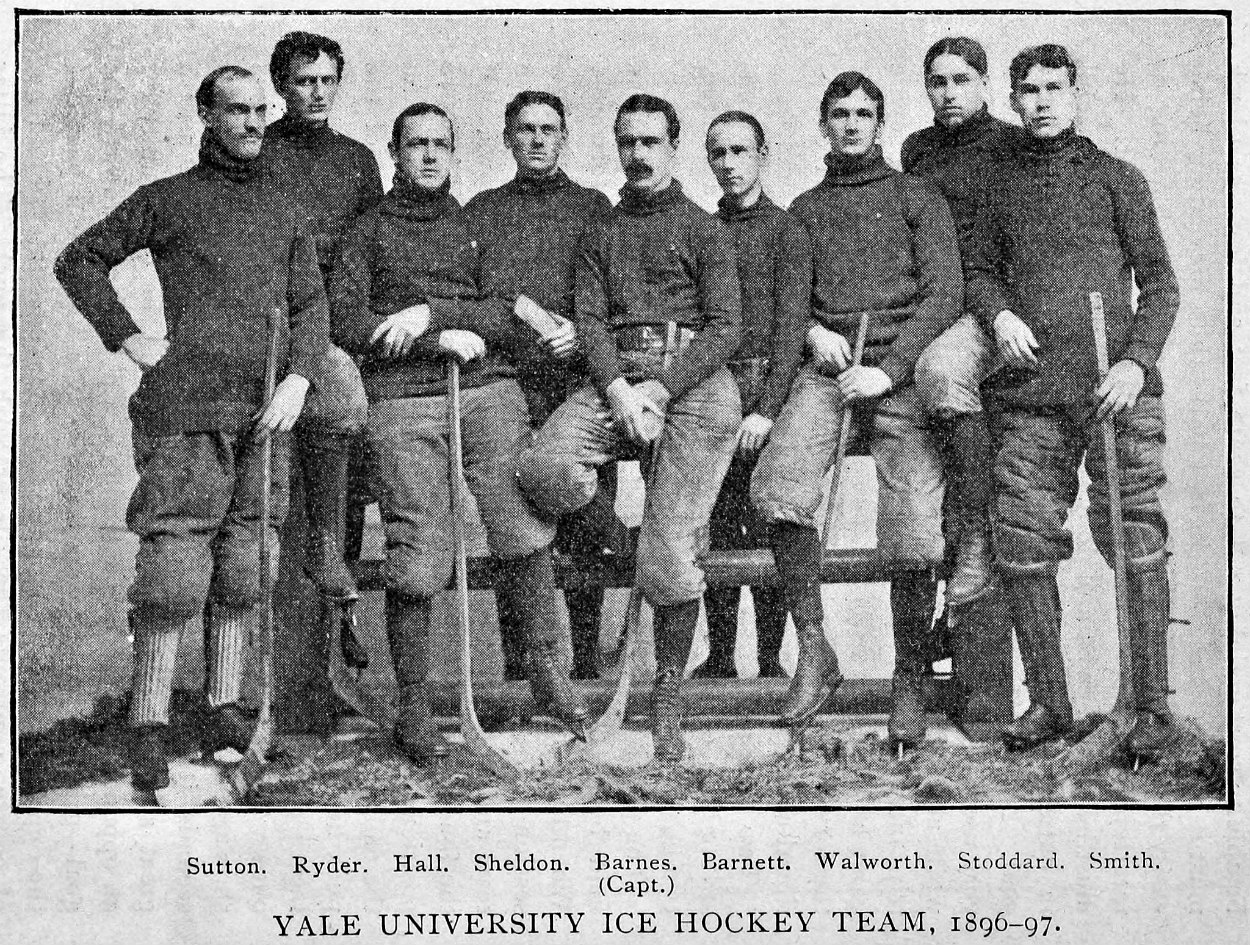
Yale University hockey team in 1896–97. From left: Herbert Sutton, Henry Ryder, John Hall, George Sheldon, Amos Barnes, William Barnett, Clarence Walworth, Sanford Stoddard, Robert Smith.

The Yale Men's Ice Hockey team is the oldest existing intercollegiate ice hockey program in the United States, the program traces its roots back to 1893. Yale played its first intercollegiate match on February 1, 1896, against Johns Hopkins, resulting in a 2–2 tie.

In the early years of the program, the team played under the direction of captains in a player-coach role and team managers. Despite not having an official head coach, the team proved successful in the early years of the program playing various amateur athletic clubs and a growing number of intercollegiate teams at various schools in the Northeast. Yale won its first intercollegiate championship in the fourth season of the program in 1899 when the Bulldogs went 6–0 through the season. Yale continued its early success winning the intercollegiate championship in each of the next three seasons. On February 22, 1904, the Bulldogs played their 100th game at the St. Nicholas Rink in New York, a 2–5 loss against rival Harvard. The team won its 100th game on January 8, 1913, with a 6–0 shutout at Columbia.

Fred Rocque became the program's first head coach in the 1916–17 season, during which the team finished with ten wins and four losses. The following two seasons from 1917 to 1919, the team only played three games due to the World War. Following the break, Talbot Hunter took over as head coach for the 1919–20 season. Hunter's Yale team began the season on a five-game trip to Canada, the first time an American university would make such a trip. During the rest of the 1919–20 season and through the 1920–21 season Yale played home games in Philadelphia at the Philadelphia Auditorium and Ice Palace due to poor ice conditions at the Bulldogs home rink. Clarence Wanamaker took over as head coach after serving as the coach of Dartmouth from 1915 to 1920. Wanamaker would become the first multi-year head coach in program history and led the team from 1921 to 1928. In his sixth season, the 1926–27 season, ice hockey was given major sport status by the university. He led the program to a record high 18-win season in 1922–23 and followed that season with a 14-win season, the first back to back double digit-win seasons in program history.

The Quadrangular League was created for the 1933–34 with Harvard, Yale, Princeton and Dartmouth. The league is considered the predecessor to the Ivy League and ECAC Hockey. In 1936, the Council of Ivy Group Presidents agreed on the formal formation of the League, however the agreement did not go into effect until the 1955–56 season. Yale won the Hobey Baker Trophy, given to Quadrangular League champions in the 1934–35 season.

In 1938, the university hired former New York Rangers player, Murray Murdoch to take over the hockey program. Murdoch quickly turned the Bulldogs team around, after three consecutive losing seasons, he recorded back-to-back 10-win seasons followed by a 12-win and 14-win season. Seasons were shortened from 1942 to 1946 during World War II and following the war Army joined the Quadrangular League and it became known as the Pentagonal League in 1946–47. Army left the league after two season, but was replaced by Brown. In the 1951–52 season, the Bulldogs swept through the Pentagonal League with a 6–1–0 league record and finished the regular season 16–7–0. The team received a bid to the 1952 NCAA Ice Hockey tournament. It was the first Frozen Four appearance by the university. The four-team tournament, still in its early years, having first been played in 1948, was held at the Broadmoor Arena in Colorado Springs, Colorado. Yale lost to the hometown Colorado College Tigers but won the consolation game 4–1 over St. Lawrence to place third in the tournament. Murdoch guided Yale to its 500th program win in the 1953–54 season on March 3, 1954, in a 10–7 win over Providence.

In 1961 Yale and the other members of the Pentagonal League joined various other schools in New England to form the 28-team ECAC Hockey. After two seasons a number of the smaller programs split leaving the ECAC with the Ivy League schools and a number of other Division I programs. Murray Murdoch ended his tenure as Yale head coach after 27 seasons in 1965. Murdoch finished with a record of 271–234–20, lead the Bulldogs to two Hobey Baker Trophy Quadrangular League Championships, and the program's first NCAA Frozen Four appearance.

=== Taylor era (1976–2006) ===
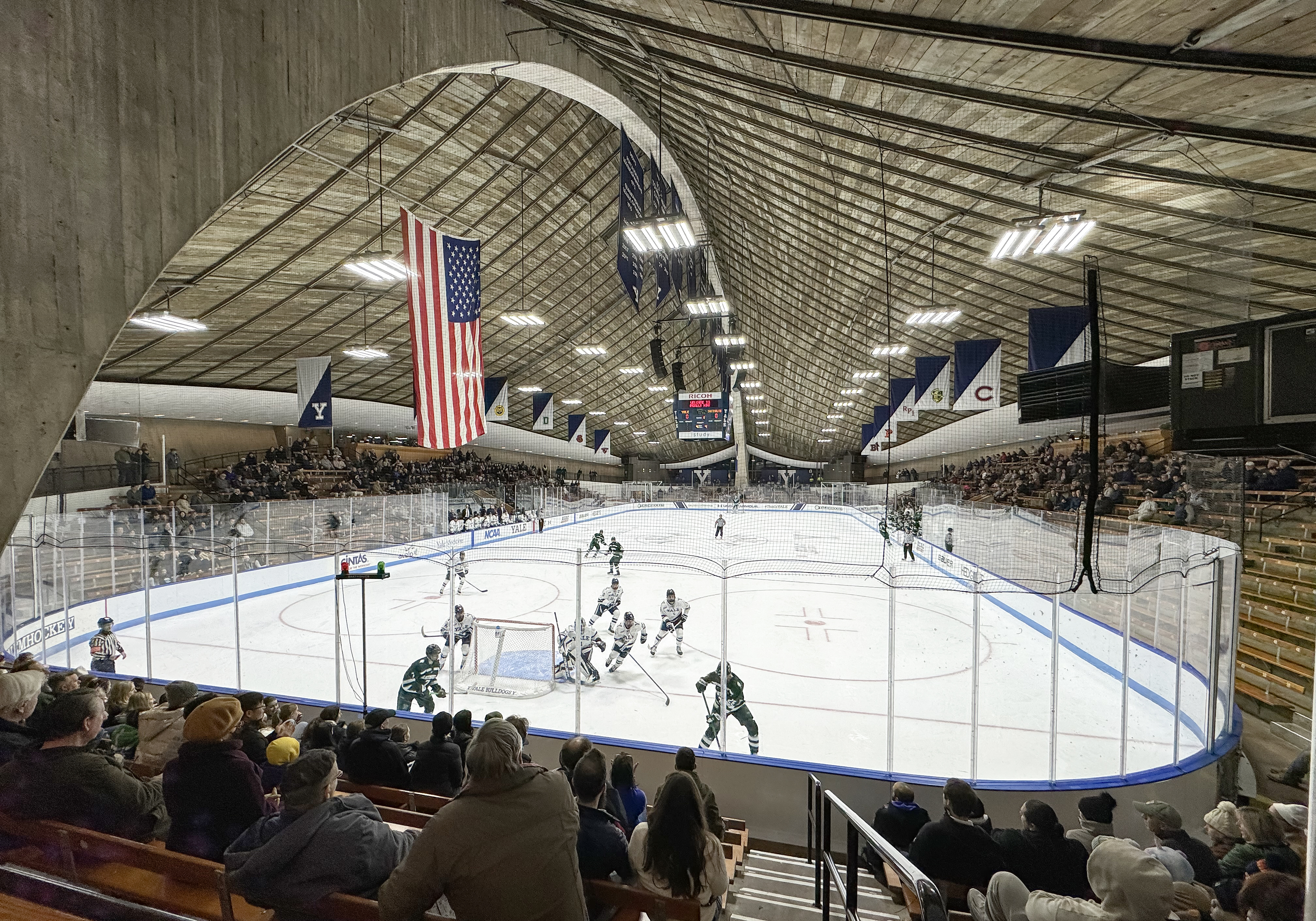
Ingalls Rink, completed in 1958

Tim Taylor, a 1963 Harvard graduate and Crimson assistant coach from 1969 to 1976 under Cooney Weiland, took over the Yale program in 1976 after a number of losing seasons, including the 1974–75 season when the team finished 1–21–1 (.065). With Taylor behind the bench, the program turned around and within two seasons Taylor lead the Bulldogs to a 14-win season. In the 1984–85 and 1985–86 seasons, Yale reached back-to-back 20-win seasons for the first time in program history. That same season, on November 15, 1986, Yale beat rival Harvard 7–5 to win the 100th game of the Taylor era. With the win he became the second Yale coach to win at least 100 games.

Yale won its first ECAC Regular season Champion in the 1997–98 season. Despite losing in the ECAC playoffs to Harvard, Yale received an at-large bid to the 1998 NCAA Ice Hockey tournament. The Bulldogs lost in the opening round of the NCAA tournament 0–4 to Ohio State. The Bulldogs finished the season setting a new program best record of 23–9–3 (.700). With the success of the season coach Taylor was named the national coach of the year in 1997–98 by the American Hockey Coaches Association. In 2001–02 Yale got their revenge against Ohio State when the Bulldogs beat the Buckeyes 6–2 in Columbus, Ohio, to win the university's 2,000th game.

Yale made the 2006 ECAC playoffs and faced Union in the best-of-3 series first round series. After winning the first game 2–1 in overtime the second game of the series on March 4, 2006, was tied 2–2 at the end of regulation. 11th-seeded Yale eventually won 3–2 when David Meckler redirected a Zach Mayer shot 1:35 into the fifth overtime for a shorthanded goal, giving the a 3–2 victory over the 6th-seeded Union. The fifth overtime goal came at 1:10 a.m., six hours and 10 minutes after start of the game. The 141 minutes and 35 seconds set a new NCAA record for the longest played in NCAA men's hockey history. The win would become Taylor's last victory as Yale head coach after Yale's season ended with a 2-game sweep by Dartmouth in the second round of the ECAC playoffs.

Tim Taylor was let go at the conclusion of the 2005–06 season after 28 seasons as head coach of the team. During his program leading tenure Taylor recorded 342 wins, 433 losses 55 ties; becoming the first Yale coach to eclipse the 300 win mark. He coached more games than any other ECAC coach and guided Yale to 19 ECAC playoff appearances, the 1997 Cleary Cup- awarded to the ECAC Regular season Champion, and one NCAA tournament appearance. In addition, he coached all six of the school's Hobey Baker Award finalists 30 years at Yale. Taylor missed two seasons in 1984 and 1994 to coach United States Olympic Team.

=== Allain era (2006–2025) ===
In 2006 Keith Allain, a 1980 graduate of Yale, was named the school's eighth coach in program history and first new head coach in 30 years. Allain coached his first game as head coach on October 21, 2006, when Yale played McGill in an exhibition game. His first NCAA game and NCAA win came on October 27, 2006, against Holy Cross 2–1. After finishing his first season 11–17–3, Allain's Bulldogs rebounded the following season recording a 16 win season. Yale captured the Cleary Cup for ECAC Regular season Champions in the 2008–09 season. The Bulldogs followed the regular season by sweeping Brown in the ECAC Quarterfinal Round then getting a 4–3 win over St. Lawrence 4–3. In the ECAC Championship, Yale shut out Cornell 5–0 for the program's first ECAC Playoff Championship. The win sent the Bulldogs to the 2009 NCAA Ice Hockey tournament. After falling 1–4 to Vermont in the NCAA East Regional, Yale finished the season with a record of 24–8–2, the first 20-win season since the 1997–98 season.

The Bulldogs repeated as Cleary Cup Champions in the 2009–10 season and received an at-large bid to the 2010 NCAA Ice Hockey tournament after falling to Brown 2 games to 1 in a best-of-three quarterfinal round of the ECAC Tournament. The third-seeded Bulldogs faced the second-seeded North Dakota in the NCAA Northeast Regional held in Worcester, Massachusetts. After starting the third period with a three-goal lead, Yale held on during a Fighting Sioux comeback to win the game 3–2. The win was the first NCAA tournament win since 1952. In the second round of the tournament, Yale lost to Boston College in a high scoring game, 7–9.

In the 2010–11 NCAA Division I men's ice hockey rankings, the Bulldogs ranked number 1 in the poll in December 2010 for the first time in the history of the poll. Yale finished the regular season second in the ECAC but won the ECAC playoffs with a 6–0 win over Cornell in the finals. The Bulldogs advanced into their third consecutive NCAA tournament. Yale was seeded first in the 2011 NCAA Ice Hockey tournament and placed into the East Regional, held in Bridgeport, Connecticut. In the opening round the Bulldogs came close to an upset but defeated the fourth-seeded Air Force 2–1 in overtime. The win over Air Force sent the hometown Bulldogs to the East Regional Finals where they would take on three-seeded Minnesota–Duluth. The game would become the final game of Yale's season after Minnesota-Duluth defeated Yale 5–3 and eventually went on to win the NCAA Championship. Despite the loss, Yale finished the season 28–7–1, recording the best record in the history of the program.

In the 2012–2013 season, the Bulldogs won another Ivy League Championship. The team finished fourth in the 2013 ECAC tournament after losing to Union 0–5 in the semifinal and falling to Quinnipiac 0–3 in the third-place match. Despite their disappointing showing in the ECAC tournament, the Bulldogs qualified for the last at-large bid in the 2013 NCAA tournament thanks to Notre Dame's victory over Michigan in the CCHA Tournament final. In the first round of the NCAA tournament, the 15th-seeded Bulldogs shocked 2nd-seeded Minnesota, winning 3–2 after forward Jesse Root scored 9 seconds into the overtime period, the fastest overtime goal in the history of the NCAA tournament. The next day, the Bulldogs defeated North Dakota 4–1, earning them their first berth in the Frozen Four in 61 years. In the Frozen Four semifinal, Yale defeated University of Massachusetts Lowell 3–2 on captain Andrew Miller's overtime goal. In the final, the Bulldogs defeated 1st-overall-seeded Quinnipiac 4–0 for their first NCAA Division I National Championship. Two weeks after winning their first championship, longtime Yale coach, Tim Taylor, died at the age of 71, he had been the coach for the Bulldogs prior to Keith Allain.

The 2013–2014 season was an off-year for the Bulldogs after finishing 3rd in the Ivy League and being eliminated in the quarterfinal round of the 2014 ECAC tournament in a 0–2 series with Quinnipiac. Yale looked to rebound in the 2014–15 season and successfully did by capturing their 12th Ivy League Championship. For the second year in a row the Bulldogs were eliminated in the quarterfinal round of the ECAC tournament in a 1–2 series with Harvard. The Bulldogs still received an at-large bid to the 2015 NCAA tournament thanks to Harvard's victory over Colgate in the ECAC Tournament final and Boston University's victory over University of Massachusetts Lowell in the Hockey East Tournament final. In the first round of the NCAA tournament, the 14th-seeded Bulldogs faced off against 3rd-seeded Boston University, losing 2–3 after Terrier forward Danny O'Regan scored in the overtime period.

In August of 2025, Allain announced his retirement. Due to the short time frame for the upcoming season, Joe Howe, who had been an assistant coach since 2021, was named interim head coach while a national search for a full time coach would take place following the 2025–26 season.

On April 20, 2026, Jeff Hamilton was announced as the new Malcolm G. Chace Head Coach of Men's Hockey. He is a Yale College alum who captained the team. He is also the program's all time leading scorer.

== Season-by-season results ==
Source:

== Head coaching record ==
Starting in 1998, the head coach position has been known as the Malcolm G. Chace Head Coach of Men's Hockey as a memorial to Malcolm Chace, an 1896 alumnus and the man credited with bringing ice hockey to the United States.

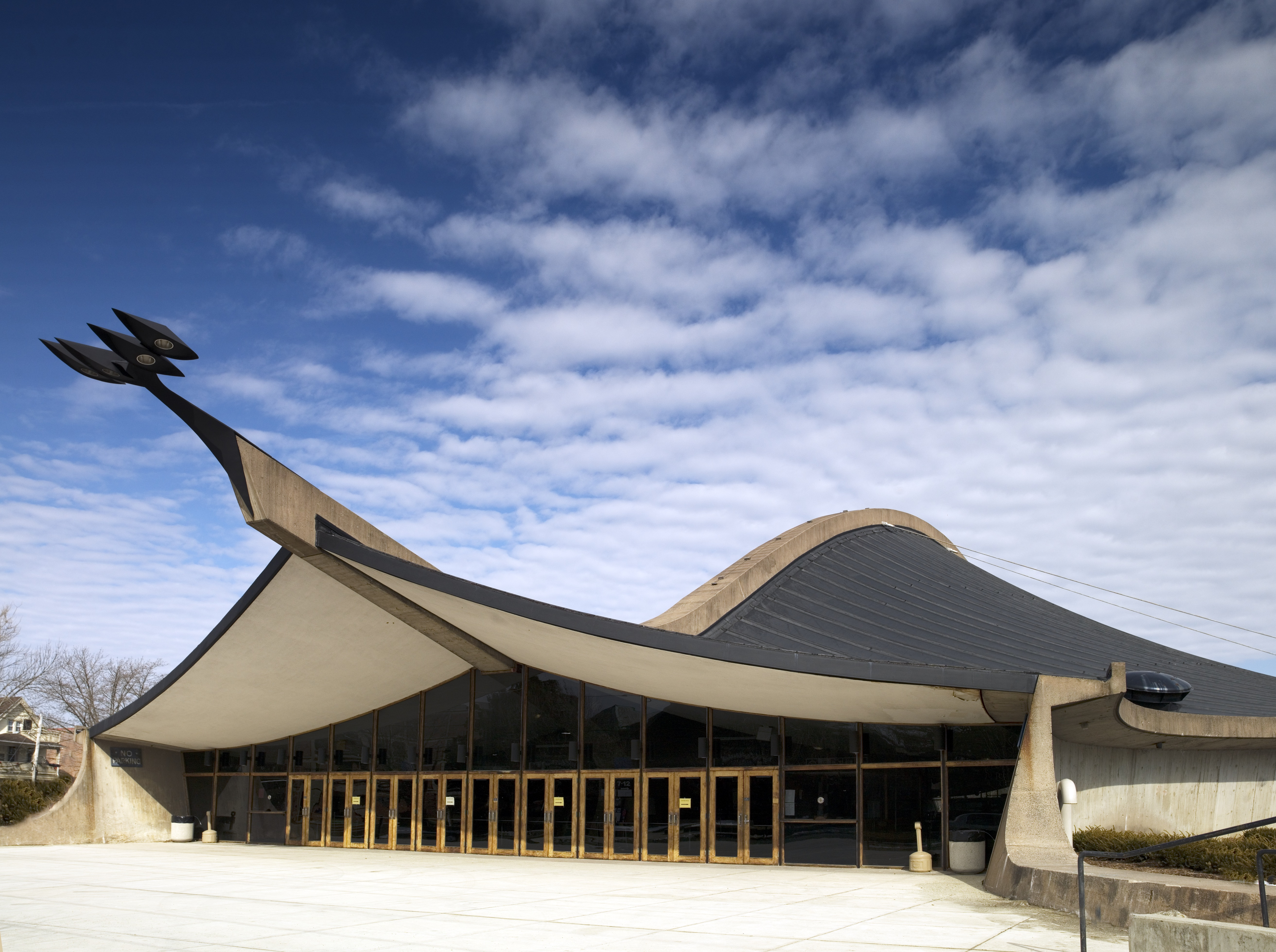
Front of Ingalls Rink, home of Yale men's and women's ice hockey

As of the completion of the 2025–26 season.

Tenure	Coach	Years	Record	Pct.
1895–1916, 1917–1919	No Coach	23	125–120–11	.510
1916–1917	Fred Rocque	1	10–4–0	.714
1919–1920	Talbot Hunter	1	4–5–0	.444
1920–1921	Francis Bangs	1	3–6–1	.350
1921–1928	Clarence Wanamaker	7	76–41–4	.645
1928–1930	Lawrence Noble*	2	32–2–2	.917
1930–1938	Holcomb York*	8	77–64–5	.545
1938–1965	Murray Murdoch	27	263–235–20	.527
1965–1972	Richard Gagliardi	7	60–105–2	.365
1972–1976	Paul Lufkin	4	25–68–2	.274
1976–1983, 1984–1993, 1994–2006	Tim Taylor	28	337–433–55	.442
1983–1984	Mike Gilligan (interim)	1	12–13–1	.481
1993–1994	Daniel Poliziani* (interim)	1	5–21–1	.204
2006–2025	Keith Allain*	18	282–254–54	.524
2025-2026	Joe Howe (interim)	1	8-22-1	.274
2026-Present	Jeff Hamilton*	1	0-0-0	.000
Totals	13 coaches	129 seasons	1,311–1,371–158	.489

Note: (*) indicates former Bulldogs player

== Championships ==
=== National championships ===
Year	Champion	Score	Runner-up	City	Arena
2013	Yale	4–0	Quinnipiac	Pittsburgh, PA	Consol Energy Center

=== ECAC Tournament championships ===
Year	Champion	Score	Runner-up	City	Arena
2009	Yale	5–0	Cornell	Albany, NY	Times Union Center
2011	Yale	6–0	Cornell	Atlantic City, NJ	Boardwalk Hall

=== ECAC regular season championships ===
(Known as Cleary Cup Championships)

Year	Conference record	Overall record	Coach
1997–98	17–4–1	23–9–3	Tim Taylor
2008–09	15–5–2	24–8–2	Keith Allain
2009–10	15–5–2	21–10–3	Keith Allain

Runners-up in 1985–86, 2010–11, 2015–16

=== Trophies ===
- Intercollegiate Champions (five times):
  - 1899, 1900, 1901, 1902, 1930 (Co-champions)
- Quadrangular League Champions (two times):
  - 1935, 1940
- Pentagonal League Champions (one time):
  - 1952
- Ivy League Champions (13 times):
  - 1981, 1985 (Co-champions), 1992, 1998, 1999 (Co-champions), 2001, 2007 (Co-champions), 2009, 2010, 2011, 2013, 2015, 2016 (Co-champions)
- Heroes Hat Champions: Annual Game (since 2007) played at Quinnipiac (three times):
  - 2011, 2012, 2015 (Co-champions)
- Rivalry on Ice Champions: Annual Game (played from 2014 to 2015) vs. Harvard Played at Madison Square Garden (two times):
  - 2014, 2015

== Records by opponent ==
Ivy League Opponents
as of the conclusion of the 2015–16 season
Note: GP = Games played, W = Wins, L = Losses, T = Ties, Win % = Win Percentage

Opponent	GP	W-L-T	Win %	First meeting	Last meeting
Princeton	255	142–103–10	0.576	11–0 W 1900	6–0 W February 26, 2016
Harvard	252	90–142–20	0.397	5–4 W February 26, 1900	2–1 W February 7, 2016
Dartmouth	215	109–92–14	0.540	2–4 L January 16, 1907	1–2 L March 12, 2016
Brown	179	95–76–8	0.553	0–1 L January 29, 1898	2–1 W January 16, 2016
Cornell	150	62–82–6	0.433	5–0 W February 22, 1902	4–2 W February 13, 2016
Penn	31	17–13–1	0.565	4–1 L 1899	0–4 W February 11, 1978
Columbia	23	20–2–1	0.891	7–2 W March 27, 1897	10–2 W December 14, 1921

=== Rivals ===
Ever since the Quinnipiac Bobcats moved to the ECAC, they have become one of Yale's biggest non-Ivy rivals. The rivalry is dubbed the Battle of Whitney Avenue as the two campuses are separated by a mere 8 miles on Whitney Avenue in Hamden, Connecticut, to New Haven, Connecticut. The two teams met on April 13, 2013, for the fourth time in the 2012–13 season in Pittsburgh, Pennsylvania to play for the national championship. Although, Quinnipiac had won the previous three meetings (all in the 2012–13 season) by a combined score of 13–3, Yale shut them out in the national championship game, 4–0.

== Awards and honors ==
Spencer Penrose Award

- Tim Taylor, 1998

NCAA tournament Most Outstanding Player

- Andrew Miller, 2013

ECAC Player of the Year

- Ray Giroux, D: 1998
- Chris Higgins, F: 2003

ECAC Defensive Player of the Year

- Ray Giroux, D: 1998
- Rob O'Gara, D: 2015, 2016

Ken Dryden Award (ECAC Goalie of the Year)

- Alex Westlund, G: 1998
- Alex Lyon, G: 2015, 2016

ECAC Defensive Forward of the Year

- Jesse Root, F: 2014
- Carson Cooper, F: 2016

ECAC Rookie of the Year

- Chris Higgins, F: 2002
- Sean Backamn, F: 2007
- Joe Snively, F: 2016

Tim Taylor Award (ECAC Coach of the Year)

- Tim Taylor: 1987, 1992, 1998
- Keith Allain: 2009

ECAC Sportsmanship Trophy

- Yale University Bulldogs: 2015, 2016

ECAC Tournament MVP

- Sean Backman, F: 2009
- Ryan Rondeau, G: 2010

Ivy League Player of the Year

- Dan Poliziani, F: 1982
- Mike O'Neill, G: 1989
- Mark Kaufmann, F: 1993
- Ray Giroux, D: 1998
- Jeff Hamilton, F: 1999, 2001
- Brian O'Neill, F: 2012
- Andrew Miller, F: 2013

Ivy League Rookie of the Year

- Jeff Dwyer, D: 2001
- Chris Higgins, F: 2002
- Michael Karwoski, F: 2006
- Sean Backman, F: 2007
- Alex Lyon, G: 2014
- Ryan Hitchcock, F: 2015
- Joe Snively, F: 2016

Ivy League Coach of the Year

- Keith Allain: 2015, 2016

AHCA First Team All-Americans

- 2014-14: Alex Lyon, G: Rob O'Gara, D
- 2002–03: Chris Higgins, F
- 2000–01: Jeff Hamilton, F
- 1997–98: Ray Giroux, D
- 1992–93: Jack Duffy, D
- 1988–89: Mike O'Neill, G
- 1982–83: Bob Brooke, F
- 1966–67: Jack Morrison, F
- 1958–59, Gerry Jones, G

== Program records ==
=== Career ===
- Most goals in a career: Ding Palmer, 87 (1927–30)
- Most assists in a career: Andrew Miller, 114 (2009–13)
- Most points in a career: Jeff Hamilton, 173 (1996–01)
- Most penalty minutes in a career: John Emmons, 293 (1992–96)
- Most points in a career, defenseman: Dave Baseggio, 108 (1985–89)
- Most wins in a career, Alex Lyon, 50 (2014–2016)
- Most shutouts in a career, Alex Lyon, 15 (2014–2016)

=== Season ===
- Most goals in a season: Ding Palmer, 52 (1927–28)
- Most assists in a season: Mark Kaufmann, 38 (1992–93)
- Most points in a season: Mark Kaufmann, 63 (1992–93)
- Most penalty minutes in a season: Jean-Francois Boucher, 107 (2005–06)
- Most points in a season, defenseman: Ray Giroux, 39 (1997–98)
- Most points in a season, freshman: Tom Walsh, 41 (1984–85)
- Most wins in a season: Ryan Rondeau, 27 (2010–11)
- Most shutouts in a season: Alex Lyon, 7 (2014–15)
- Most power play goals in a season: Martin Leroux, 14 (1992–93)

=== Game ===
- Most goals in a game: John Heron, 8 (vs. Columbia, 2/3/1909)
- Most assists in a game: 3 players, 6 (last time: John Sather vs St. Lawrence, 111/20/1990)
- Most points in a game: John Heron, 8 (vs. Columbia, 2/3/1909)

== Current roster ==
As of August 28, 2025.

No.	Nat.	Player	Class	Pos	Height	Weight	DoB	Hometown	Previous team	NHL rights
1	(United States)	Jack Stark	Junior	G	5' 9" (1.75 m)	146 lb (66 kg)	2003-06-19	Chaska, Minnesota	Chicago Steel (USHL)	—
2	(United States)	Bayard Hall	Senior	D	6' 1" (1.85 m)	176 lb (80 kg)	2002-08-16	Oldwick, New Jersey	Youngstown Phantoms (USHL)	—
4	(United States)	Dylan Hunt	Freshman	D	6' 0" (1.83 m)	174 lb (79 kg)	2006-02-09	Marlborough, Massachusetts	Cedar Rapids RoughRiders (USHL)	—
5	(Finland)	Joose Pesonen	Freshman	D	5' 10" (1.78 m)	163 lb (74 kg)	2005-05-12	Kuopio, Finland	South Shore Kings (NCDC)	—
6	(United States)	Hudson Miller	Freshman	D	6' 4" (1.93 m)	190 lb (86 kg)	2005-07-14	New York, New York	West Kelowna Warriors (BCHL)	—
7	(United States)	Tucker Hartmann	Senior	D	5' 11" (1.8 m)	174 lb (79 kg)	2002-04-04	Southborough, Massachusetts	Salmon Arm Silverbacks (BCHL)	—
8	(United States)	Ronan O'Donnell	Sophomore	F	6' 2" (1.88 m)	174 lb (79 kg)	2004-02-26	Fairfield, Connecticut	Madison Capitols (USHL)	—
9	(United States)	Micah Berger	Sophomore	F	5' 11" (1.8 m)	174 lb (79 kg)	2004-06-29	Bethesda, Maryland	Surrey Eagles (BCHL)	—
10	(United States)	James Shannon	Freshman	F	5' 10" (1.78 m)	179 lb (81 kg)	2004-08-12	New York, New York	Coquitlam Express (BCHL)	—
11	(Canada)	Hughie Hooker	Sophomore	D	5' 7" (1.7 m)	159 lb (72 kg)	2003-10-11	Brandon, Manitoba	Brooks Bandits (BCHL)	—
12	(United States)	Will Richter	Junior	F	6' 1" (1.85 m)	172 lb (78 kg)	2004-08-20	Greenwich, Connecticut	Penticton Vees (BCHL)	—
13	(Finland)	Iisai Pesonen	Junior	F	5' 10" (1.78 m)	150 lb (68 kg)	2004-02-20	Kuopio, Finland	KalPa U20 (U20 SM-sarja)	—
14	(Canada)	Tom Molson	Freshman	F	5' 8" (1.73 m)	154 lb (70 kg)	2005-01-05	Montréal, Quebec	Victoria Grizzlies (BCHL)	—
15	(Canada)	Kalen Szeto	Senior	F	5' 7" (1.7 m)	155 lb (70 kg)	2002-10-12	Vancouver, British Columbia	Victoria Grizzlies (BCHL)	—
16	(United States)	David Andreychuk	Junior	F	6' 1" (1.85 m)	190 lb (86 kg)	2002-04-02	Los Angeles, California	Northeast Generals (NAHL)	—
17	(United States)	Zach Wagnon	Sophomore	F	6' 0" (1.83 m)	174 lb (79 kg)	2004-03-26	Red Bank, New Jersey	Surrey Eagles (BCHL)	—
18	(Canada)	Seiya Tanaka-Campbell	Junior	F	5' 9" (1.75 m)	170 lb (77 kg)	2003-02-12	Mill Bay, British Columbia	Vernon Vipers (BCHL)	—
19	(Canada)	JoJo Tanaka-Campbell	Senior	F	5' 11" (1.8 m)	185 lb (84 kg)	2001-01-11	Mill Bay, British Columbia	Vernon Vipers (BCHL)	—
20	(Canada)	Owen Forester	Junior	D	5' 10" (1.78 m)	185 lb (84 kg)	2003-06-17	Mississauga, Ontario	Milton Menace (OJHL)	—
21	(United States)	Kurt Gurkan	Freshman	F	5' 10" (1.78 m)	179 lb (81 kg)	2004-02-13	Darien, Connecticut	Muskegon Lumberjacks (USHL)	—
22	(Canada)	Rhys Bentham	Junior	D	5' 10" (1.78 m)	172 lb (78 kg)	2002-05-15	Calgary, Alberta	Cranbrook Bucks (BCHL)	—
23	(United States)	Joe Blackley	Sophomore	D	5' 11" (1.8 m)	185 lb (84 kg)	2003-09-08	Lockport, New York	Cranbrook Bucks (BCHL)	—
24	(United States)	David Chen	Senior	F	6' 0" (1.83 m)	172 lb (78 kg)	2003-04-01	Livingston, New Jersey	Cedar Rapids RoughRiders (USHL)	—
26	(Canada)	Elan Bar-Lev-Wise	Senior	F	6' 0" (1.83 m)	190 lb (86 kg)	2001-02-01	Vancouver, British Columbia	West Kelowna Warriors (BCHL)	—
27	(United States)	Donovan Frias	Sophomore	F	6' 4" (1.93 m)	201 lb (91 kg)	2004-11-09	Hudson, Massachusetts	Cranbrook Bucks (BCHL)	—
28	(United States)	Julian Frias	Sophomore	F	6' 4" (1.93 m)	201 lb (91 kg)	2004-11-09	Hudson, Massachusetts	Cranbrook Bucks (BCHL)	—
29	(Canada)	Braden Keeble	Freshman	F	5' 10" (1.78 m)	170 lb (77 kg)	2004-06-01	Brandon, Manitoba	Whitecourt Wolverines (AJHL)	—
31	(Canada)	Noah Pak	Sophomore	G	6' 0" (1.83 m)	161 lb (73 kg)	2003-06-01	Oakville, Ontario	Collingwood Blues (OJHL)	—

== Olympians ==
This is a list of Yale alumni were a part of an Olympic team.

Name	Position	Yale Tenure	Team	Year	Finish
Johnny Bent	Forward	1927–1930	(United States) USA	1932	Silver
Winthrop Palmer	Forward	1927–1930	(United States) USA	1932	Silver
Franklin Farrell	Goaltender	1928–1931	(United States) USA	1932	Silver
Francis Nelson	Forward	1928–1931	(United States) USA	1932	Silver
John Cookman	Forward	1929–1931	(United States) USA	1932	Silver
Fred Pearson	Left wing	1942–1943, 1945–1947	(United States) USA	1948	DQ†
Jack Morrison	Center	1965–1967	(United States) USA	1968	6th
Bob Brooke	Center	1979–1983	(United States) USA	1984	7th
Mark Arcobello	Center	2006–2010	(United States) USA	2018	7th
Broc Little	Center	2007–2011	(United States) USA	2018	7th
Brian O'Neill	Center	2008–2012	(United States) USA	2018, 2022	7th, 5th
Kenny Agostino	Left wing	2010–2014	(United States) USA	2022	5th

† Were members of the AHA team that was allowed to play in the Olympics but disqualified from medal contention.

== Bulldogs in the NHL ==
As of July 1, 2025.

= NHL All-Star team	= NHL All-Star	= NHL All-Star and NHL All-Star team	= Hall of Famers

Player	Position	Team(s)	Years	Games	Stanley Cups
Kenny Agostino	Left wing	CGY, STL, BOS, MTL, NJD, TOR	2013–2021	86	0
Peter Allen	Defenseman	PIT	1995–1996	8	0
Mark Arcobello	Center	EDM, NSH, PIT, ARI, TOR	2012–2016	139	0
Bob Brooke	Center	NYR, MNS, NJD	1983–1990	447	0
Joe Callahan	Defenseman	NYI, SJS, FLA	2002–2014	46	0
John Emmons	Defenseman	OTT, TBL, BOS	1999–2002	85	0
Craig Ferguson	Center	MTL, CGY, FLA	1993–2000	27	0
Raymond Giroux	Defenseman	NYI, NJD	1999–2004	38	0
Jeff Hamilton	Center	NYI, CHI, CAR, TOR	2003–2009	157	0
John Hayden	Right wing	CHI, NJD, ARI, BUF, SEA	2016–Present	269	0
Chris Higgins	Left wing	MTL, NYR, CGY, FLA, VAN	2003–2016	711	0
Philip Kemp	Defenseman	EDM	2023–2024	1	0

Player	Position	Team(s)	Years	Games	Stanley Cups
Bob Kudelski	Center	LAK, OTT, FLA	1987–1996	442	0
Bob Logan	Right wing	BUF, LAK	1986–1989	42	0
Alex Lyon	Goaltender	PHI, CAR, FLA, DET	2017–Present	113	0
Andrew Miller	Right Wing	EDM	2014–2016	15	0
Bradley Mills	Forward	NJD, CHI	2010–2014	34	0
Rob O'Gara	Defenseman	BOS, NYR	2016–2018	33	0
Brian O'Neill	Right wing	NJD	2015–2016	22	0
Mike O'Neill	Goaltender	WPG, ANA	1991–1997	21	0
Joe Snively	Center	WSH	2021–2024	27	0
Jack St. Ivany	Defenseman	PIT	2023–Present	33	0
Billy Sweezey	Defenseman	CBJ	2022–2023	9	0
Randy Wood	Left wing	NYI, BUF, TOR, DAL	1986–1997	741	0

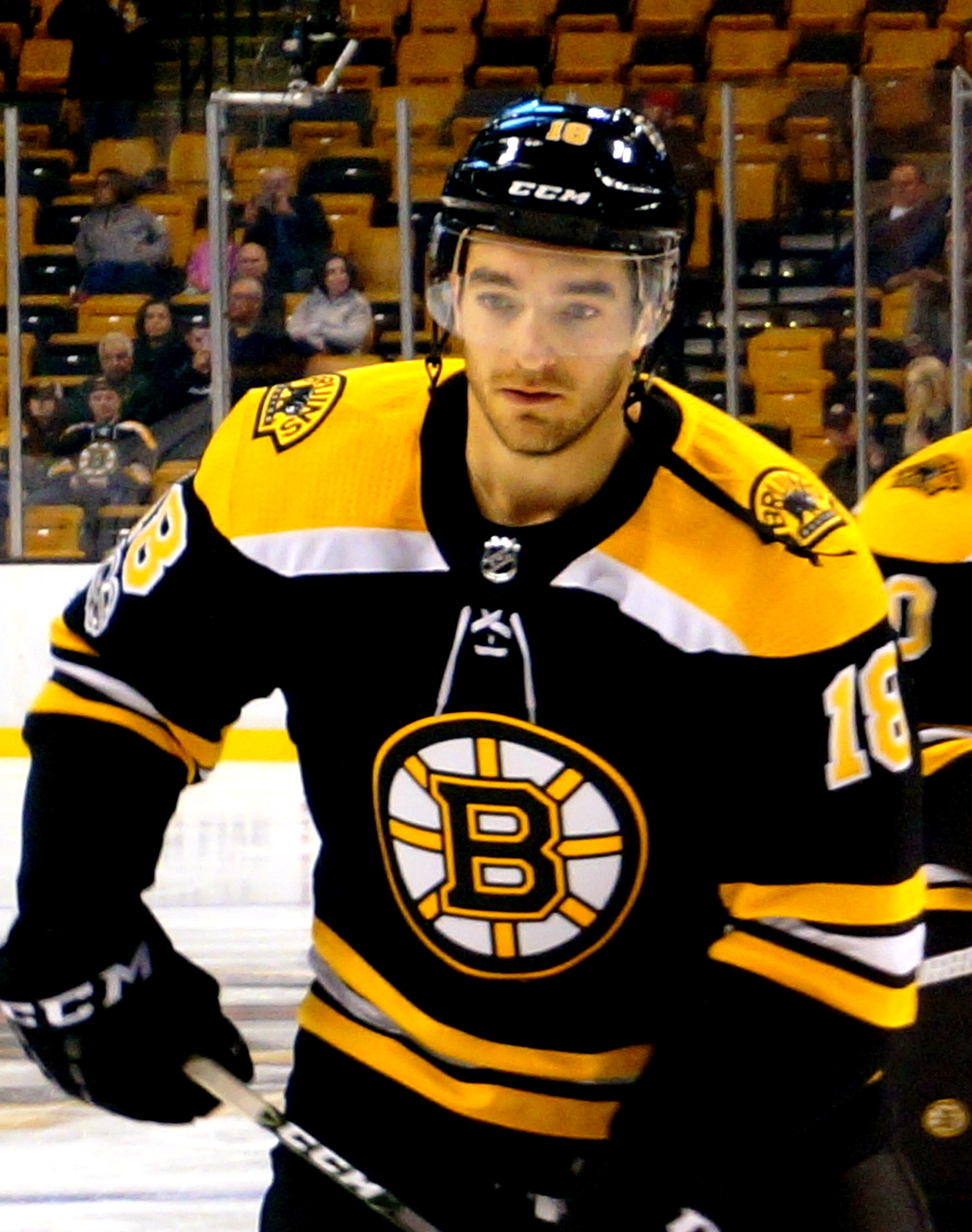
Kenny Agostino

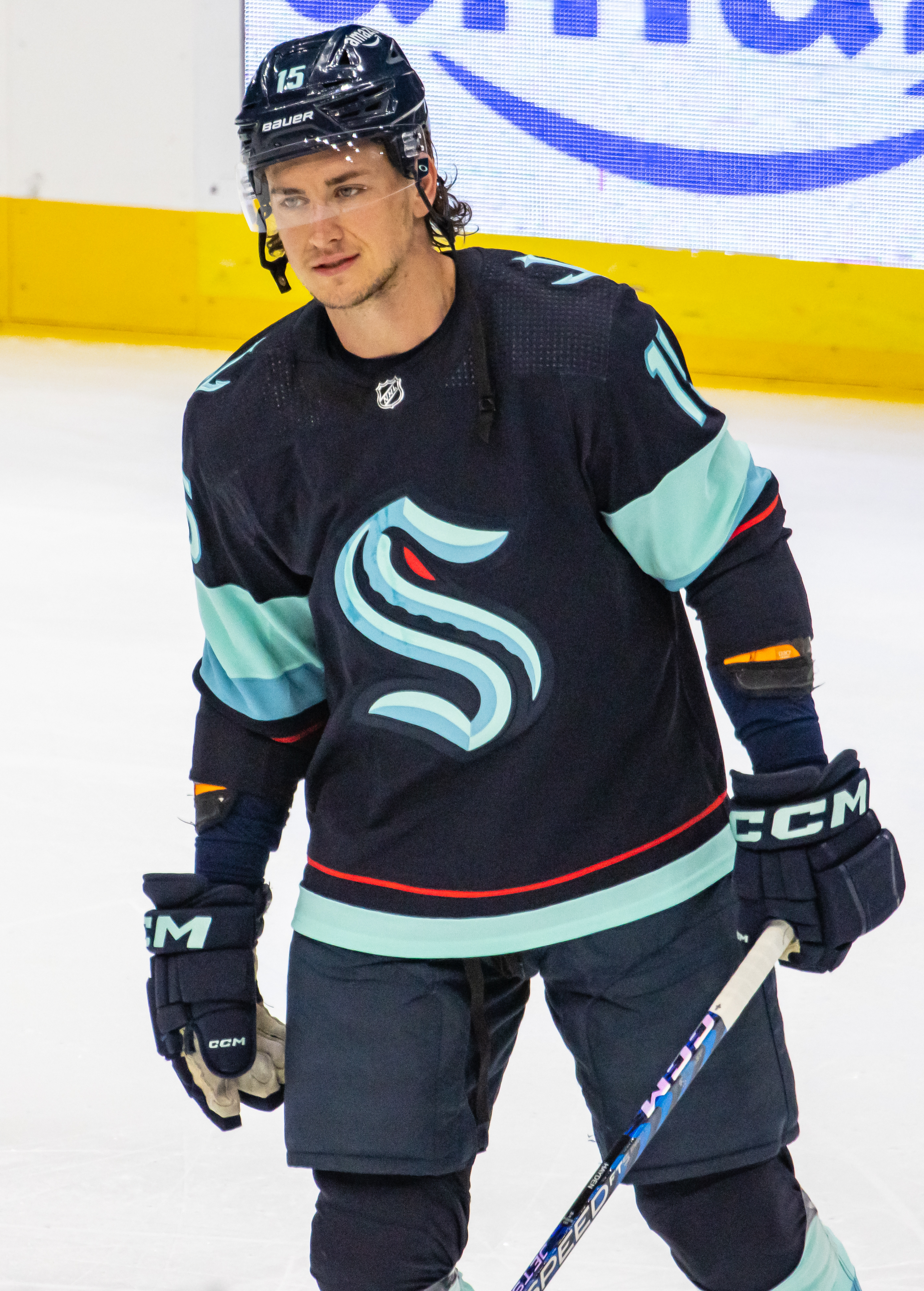
John Hayden

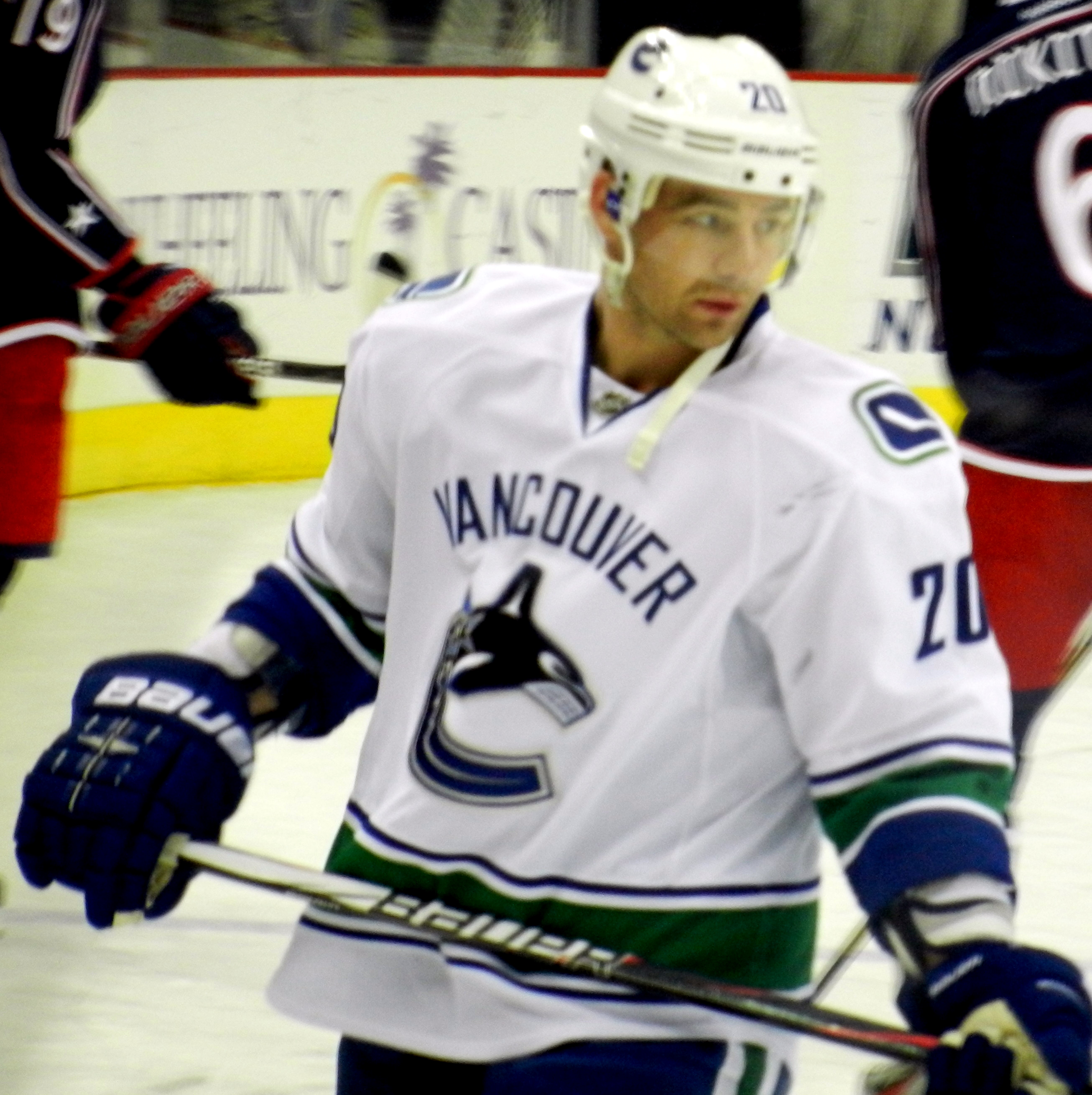
Chris Higgins

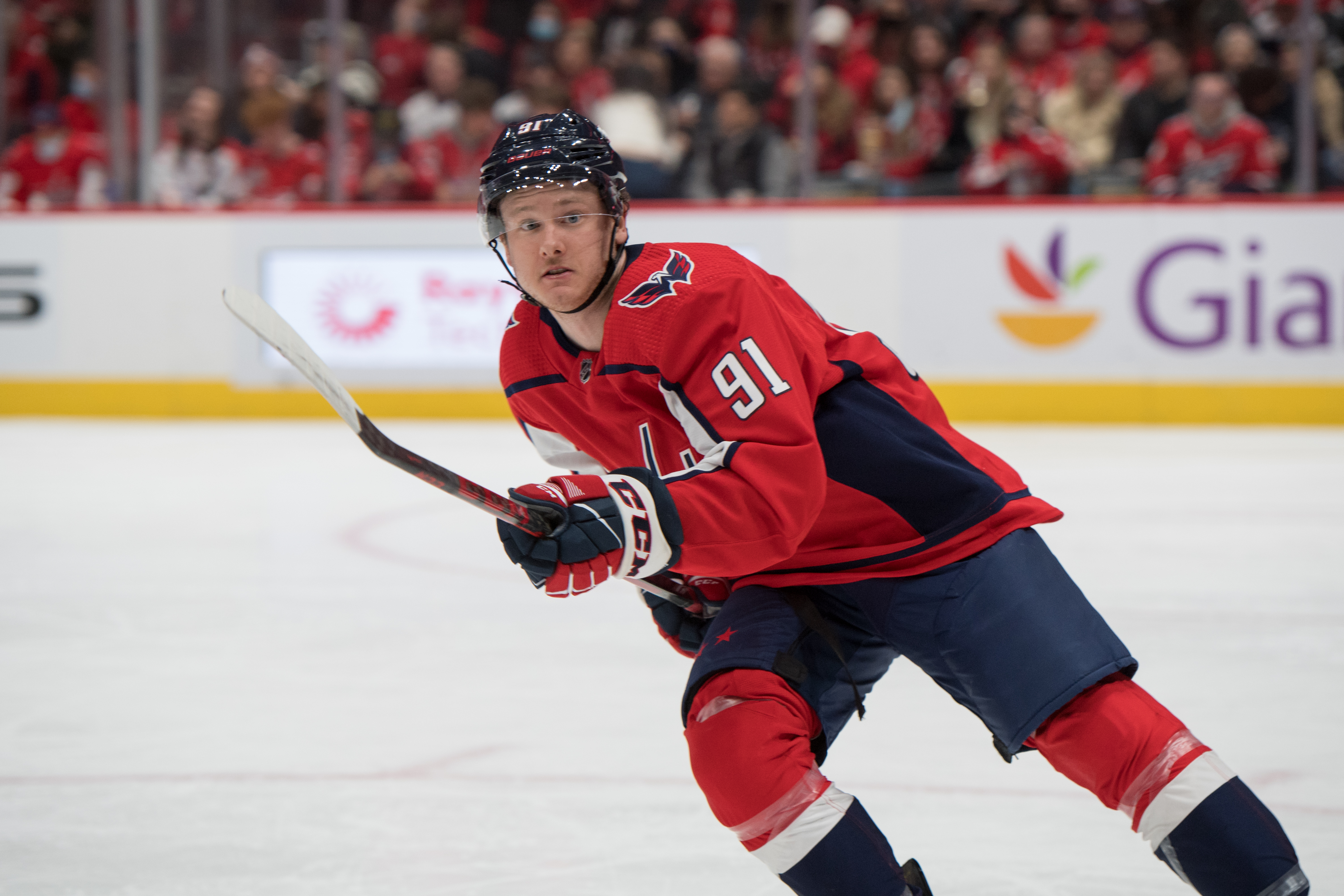
Joe Snively
