= Daniel Poliziani =

Canadian ice hockey player and coach

Current position
- Title: Associate coach
- Team: York University

Biographical details
- Born: March 5, 1959 (age 67); Burlington, Ontario, Canada
- Education: Yale University

Playing career
- 1978-82: Yale Bulldogs
- 1982: New Haven Nighthawks
- 1982-1983: Saginaw Gears
- 1983-1984: Fort Wayne Komets
- 1983-1984: Kalamazoo Wings
- 1983-1984: Dundas-Hamilton Tigers
- Position: Centre

Coaching career (HC unless noted)
- 1984-95: Yale Bulldogs (Assistant)
- 1993-94: Yale Bulldogs (Interim Head Coach)
- 1998-99: North York Rangers
- 2002-14: Appleby Bluedogs
- 2014-20: Stanstead Spartans
- 2021-Present: York University Lions (Associate Coach)

Head coaching record
- Overall: 171-148-27

Accomplishments and honors

Awards
- Second-team All-Ivy (1978-79); 2× First-team All-Ivy (1980-81, 1981-82); Ivy Player of the Year (1981-82)

Daniel James Poliziani (born March 5, 1959) is a Canadian ice hockey coach. He is currently an associate coach for the York University Lions Men's Ice Hockey team.

Poliziani played as a Centre with the Yale Bulldogs, New Haven Nighthawks, Saginaw Gears, Fort Wayne Komets, Kalamazoo Wings, and Dundas-Hamilton Tigers. Poliziani was an assistant coach with the Yale Bulldogs from 1984–95 and was the interim head coach of the Bulldogs during the 1993–94 season, while regular head coach Tim Taylor coached the United States Olympic Team. Additionally, Poliziani was head coach with both the North York Rangers from 1998–99 and Appleby Bluedogs from 2002-14.

== Playing career statistics ==
| Season | Team | League | GP | G | A | Pts | PIM |
|---|---|---|---|---|---|---|---|
| 1978-79 | Yale Bulldogs | ECAC Hockey | 27 | 10 | 25 | 35 | 10 |
| 1979-80 | Yale Bulldogs | ECAC Hockey | 23 | 10 | 10 | 20 | 20 |
| 1980-81 | Yale Bulldogs | ECAC Hockey | 26 | 17 | 21 | 38 | 14 |
| 1981-82 | Yale Bulldogs | ECAC Hockey | 25 | 22 | 16 | 38 | 18 |
| 1981-82 | New Haven Nighthawks | AHL | 3 | 0 | 1 | 1 | 0 |
| 1982-83 | Saginaw Gears | IHL | 54 | 28 | 49 | 77 | 54 |
| 1983-84 | Fort Wayne Komets | IHL | 11 | 4 | 6 | 10 | 2 |
| 1983-84 | Kalamazoo Wings | IHL | 25 | 9 | 6 | 15 | 2 |
| 1983-84 | Dundas-Hamilton Tigers | IHL | — | — | — | — | — |
| Totals | | | 194 | 100 | 134 | 234 | 120 |

== Head coaching record ==
| Season | Team | League | GP | W | L | T | Result | Playoffs |
|---|---|---|---|---|---|---|---|---|
| 1993–94 | Yale Bulldogs | ECAC Hockey | 27 | 5 | 21 | 1 | 11th ECAC | DNQ |
| 1998–99 | North York Rangers | OPJHL | 51 | 15 | 32 | 4 | 9th OPJHL-C | DNQ |
| 2010-11 | Appleby Bluedogs | CISAA | 17 | 6 | 2 | 9 | 2nd CISAA | Lost in Semi-finals |
| 2011-12 | Appleby Bluedogs | CISAA | 15 | 3 | 10 | 2 | 5th CISAA | DNQ |
| 2012-13 | Appleby Bluedogs | CISAA | 15 | 6 | 7 | 2 | 4th CISAA | Lost in Semi-finals |
| 2013-14 | Appleby Bluedogs | CISAA | 15 | 0 | 13 | 2 | 6th CISAA | DNQ |
| 2014-15 | Stanstead Spartans | MPHL | 50 | 32 | 13 | 5 | 1st Bowers Division | Lost in Semi-finals |
| 2015-16 | Stanstead Spartans | MPHL | 53 | 31 | 20 | 2 | 1st Bowers Division | Lost in Semi-finals |
| 2016-17 | Stanstead Spartans | MPHL | 51 | 34 | 17 | 0 | 1st Bowers Division | Lost in Finals |
| 2017-18 | Stanstead Spartans | MPHL | 52 | 39 | 13 | 0 | 1st Bowers Division | Lost in Finals |
| Totals | | | 346 | 171 | 148 | 27 |
