= 2020–21 ECAC Hockey men's season =

- Season: 2020–21
- Conference: ECAC Hockey
- Division: Division I
- Sport: men's ice hockey
- Duration: November 22, 2020– March 27, 2021
- Number of teams: 4

Regular Season
- Season champions: Quinnipiac
- Season MVP: Odeen Tufto
- Top scorer: Odeen Tufto

ECAC Hockey tournament
- Tournament champions: St. Lawrence
- Runners-up: Quinnipiac
- Tournament MVP: David Jankowski
- Top scorer: David Jankowski; Luc Salem

NCAA tournament
- Bids: 1
- Record: 0–1
- Best Finish: Regional semifinal
- Team(s): Quinnipiac

The 2020–21 ECAC Hockey men's season was the 60th season of play for ECAC Hockey and took place during the 2020–21 NCAA Division I men's ice hockey season. The regular was delayed until on November 22, 2020 and conclude on March 6, 2021.

== Season ==
Following the early conclusion to the 2020 season, there was a great deal of uncertainty about college hockey under the cloud of COVID-19. At the beginning of July, Rensselaer was one of the first schools to announce that it would be suspending all of its athletic programs until January at the earliest. Afterwards, most other ECAC programs prepared to begin the season at some unknown date. When the beginning of the season was tentatively set for November, many players began practicing in October. Yale ended up getting hit hard by the pandemic, having 18 players test positive just weeks before the first game was to be played. Partly as a result, the Ivy League made the decision to cancel all athletics for the 2020-21 scholastic year.

Six ECAC programs were members of the Ivy League and abided by the decision, which immediately cut the conference in half. Shortly afterwards, Rensselaer extended its suspensions to mirror those of the Ivies and were soon joined by Union. The result was that ECAC Hockey had only 4 active teams for the 2021 season. Due to the pandemic, the NCAA selection committee decided not to stick to the letter of their bylaws, which required six participating programs for a conference to receive an automatic bid for its tournament champion, and would include the ECAC champion in the NCAA tournament.

With just 4 teams available, the active programs went outside the ECAC to schedule non-conference games early in the season. Most games were played against Atlantic Hockey teams and resulted in Quinnipiac being the top-ranked ECAC program. That trend continued throughout the season and the Bobcats were not adversely affected in the national ranking despite playing what was regarded as a weak schedule. As the teams prepared to begin the ECAC tournament, Clarkson abruptly ended its season when several players violated university protocols regarding COVID safety. The tournament became a 3-team format as a result with Quinnipiac as the heavy favorite. St. Lawrence, however, pulled off a surprising upset and won their first league championship in 20 years.

With the Saints preparing for the national tournament, head coach Brent Brekke tested positive for COVID the very next day and the team was forced to withdraw. Quinnipiac, the regular season champion, was chosen as the ECAC representative instead and placed opposite Minnesota State in the first round. The Bobcats scored twice in the first period and then exchanged goals with the Mavericks to hold a 3–1 lead with just over 11 minutes remaining. MSU scored twice in the final 5:06 to tie the match and sent the game into overtime. With the late scored, all of the momentum swung to Minnesota State and Quinnipiac was constantly on their heels in the extra session. They were outshout 7–2 in just over 11 minutes and a scramble around the net resulted in the MSU earning the goal, ending probably the strangest ECAC season.

== Standings ==
2020–21 ECAC Hockey Standings
	Conference record											Overall record					
	GP	W	L	T	OTW	OTL	3/SW	PTS	PT%	GF	GA	GP	W	L	T	GF	GA
#11 Quinnipiac †	18	10	4	4	1	1	3	37	.685	54	34	29	17	8	4	100	59
#20 Clarkson	14	6	4	4	1	2	2	25	.595	29	25	22	11	7	4	62	52
St. Lawrence *	14	4	8	2	1	1	1	15	.357	30	37	17	6	8	3	40	45
Colgate	18	5	9	4	1	0	1	16	.352	34	51	22	6	11	5	48	66
Brown	0	-	-	-	-	-	-	-	-	-	-	0	-	-	-	-	-
Cornell	0	-	-	-	-	-	-	-	-	-	-	0	-	-	-	-	-
Dartmouth	0	-	-	-	-	-	-	-	-	-	-	0	-	-	-	-	-
Harvard	0	-	-	-	-	-	-	-	-	-	-	0	-	-	-	-	-
Princeton	0	-	-	-	-	-	-	-	-	-	-	0	-	-	-	-	-
Rensselaer	0	-	-	-	-	-	-	-	-	-	-	0	-	-	-	-	-
Union	0	-	-	-	-	-	-	-	-	-	-	0	-	-	-	-	-
Yale	0	-	-	-	-	-	-	-	-	-	-	0	-	-	-	-	-
Championship: March 20, 2021 † indicates conference regular season champion (Cleary Cup) * indicates conference tournament champion (Whitelaw Cup); Rankings: USCHO.com Top 20 Poll

== Coaches ==
Reid Cashman was hired on June 1, 2020, however, due to the COVID-19 pandemic he did not coach this season.

=== Records ===
Team	Head coach	Season at school	Record at school	ECAC Hockey record
Clarkson	Casey Jones	10	168–137–41	83–69–24
Colgate	Don Vaughan	28	429–459–109	259–260–73
Quinnipiac	Rand Pecknold	27	532–318–93	173–111–46
St. Lawrence	Brent Brekke	2	4–27–5	2–18–2

== Statistics ==
=== Leading scorers ===
GP = Games played; G = Goals; A = Assists; Pts = Points; PIM = Penalty minutes

Player	Position	Team	GP	G	A	Pts	PIM
Odeen Tufto	Senior	Quinnipiac	18	4	21	25	16
Ethan de Jong	Junior	Quinnipiac	18	8	9	17	20
Zach Metsa	Junior	Quinnipiac	18	3	11	14	6
Cameron Buhl	Sophomore	St. Lawrence	14	3	9	12	19
Zach Tsekos	Senior	Clarkson	14	3	8	11	4
Josh McKechney	Senior	Colgate	18	6	5	11	10
Michael Lombardi	Junior	Quinnipiac	18	3	8	11	0

=== Leading goaltenders ===
Minimum 1/3 of team's minutes played in conference games.
GP = Games played; Min = Minutes played; GA = Goals against; SO = Shutouts; SV% = Save percentage; GAA = Goals against average

Player	Class	Team	GP	Min	W	L	T	GA	SO	SV%	GAA
Ethan Haider	Freshman	Clarkson	13	802	6	3	4	21	0	.938	1.57
Keith Petruzzelli	Senior	Quinnipiac	18	1080	10	4	4	3	32	.927	1.78
Emil Zetterquist	Junior	St. Lawrence	13	778	4	7	2	31	0	.927	2.39

== ECAC tournament ==
Semifinals; March 18			Championship; March 20
			1	Quinnipiac	2
3	St. Lawrence	5*	3	St. Lawrence	3*
4	Colgate	4

Note: * denotes overtime period(s)

== NCAA tournament ==
=== Regional semifinal ===
==== West ====
March 27, 2021; 2:00 PM	(2) Minnesota State	4 – 3 (OT) (0–2, 1–0, 2–1, 1–0)	(3) Quinnipiac	Budweiser Events Center, Loveland, Colorado; Attendance: 101

Game reference

Dryden McKay
Goalies
Keith Petruzzelli
Referees:
Toni Czech
Brett Sheva
Linesmen:
Justin Cornell
Pat Richardson

	0–1	03:00 – Odeen Tufto (8) (Räsänen)
	0–2	15:35 – Peter DiLiberatore (5) (van Nes, Fillion)
(Napravnik) Jake Jaremko (4) – PP – 38:09	1–2
	1–3	48:54 – C. J. McGee (1) (Miller, Harris)
(Gerads, Aamodt) Nathan Smith (6) – 54:54	2–3
(Livingstone) Cade Borchardt (9) – EA – 58:58	3–3
(Furry, Lutz) Ryan Sandelin (6) – GW – 71:13	4–3

6 min
Penalties
4 min
38
Shots
30

== Ranking ==
=== USCHO ===
Team	Pre	1	2	3	4	5	6	7	8	9	10	11	12	13	14	15	16	17	18	19	20	Final
Clarkson	8	8	9	9	7	7	8	10	10	13	14	12	13	14	13	15	14	14	18	20	N/A	20
Colgate	NR	NR	NR	NR	NR	NR	NR	NR	NR	NR	NR	NR	NR	NR	NR	NR	NR	NR	NR	NR	N/A	NR
Quinnipiac	13	13	12	11	11	11	16	12	13	11	10	11	12	11	12	12	11	12	10	11	N/A	12
St. Lawrence	NR	NR	NR	NR	NR	NR	NR	NR	NR	NR	NR	NR	NR	NR	NR	NR	NR	NR	NR	NR	N/A	NR

=== USA Today ===
Team	Pre	1	2	3	4	5	6	7	8	9	10	11	12	13	14	15	16	17	18	19	20	Final
Clarkson	8	8	9	8	7	8	9	12	10	12	14	14	13	15	13	13	14	14	NR	NR	NR	NR
Colgate	NR	NR	NR	NR	NR	NR	NR	NR	NR	NR	NR	NR	NR	NR	NR	NR	NR	NR	NR	NR	NR	NR
Quinnipiac	14	14	11	11	10	11	NR	13	12	11	10	11	11	11	11	11	10	11	10	10	11	11
St. Lawrence	NR	NR	NR	NR	NR	NR	NR	NR	NR	NR	NR	NR	NR	NR	NR	NR	NR	NR	NR	NR	NR	NR

== Awards ==
=== NCAA ===
Award	Recipient	
Derek Hines Unsung Hero Award	Josh Kosack, Union	
AHCA All-American Teams
East First Team	Pos	Team
Odeen Tufto	F	Quinnipiac

=== ECAC ===
Award		Recipient
Player of the Year		Odeen Tufto, Quinnipiac
Best Defensive Forward		Zach Tsekos, Clarkson
Best Defensive Defenseman		Pierson Brandon, Colgate
Rookie of the Year		Ethan Haider, Clarkson
Ken Dryden Award		Keith Petruzelli, Quinnipiac
Student-Athlete of the Year		Kyle Betts, Cornell
Tim Taylor Award		Rand Pecknold, Quinnipiac
All-ECAC Hockey Teams
First Team	Position	Rookie Team
Keith Petruzelli, Quinnipiac	G	Ethan Haider, Clarkson
Zach Metsa, Quinnipiac	D	Pierson Brandon, Colgate
Connor McCarthy, Clarkson	D	Luc Salem, St. Lawrence
Odeen Tufto, Quinnipiac	F	Ty Smilanic, Quinnipiac
Zach Tsekos, Clarkson	F	Alex Young, Colgate
Cameron Buhl, St. Lawrence	F	Greg Lapointe, St. Lawrence
Josh McKechney, Colgate	F	

=== Conference tournament ===
Most Outstanding Player
David Jankowski	St. Lawrence
All-Tournament team
None selected

== 2021 NHL entry draft ==
Round	Pick	Player	College	NHL team
1	13	Matthew Coronato^{†}	Harvard	Calgary Flames
3	73	Ayrton Martino^{†}	Clarkson	Dallas Stars
3	79	Justin Ertel^{†}	Cornell	Dallas Stars
5	137	Aku Koskenvuo^{†}	Harvard	Vancouver Canucks
5	138	Jack Bar^{†}	Harvard	Dallas Stars
7	208	Hank Kempf^{†}	Cornell	New York Rangers
7	211	Robert Flinton^{†}	Dartmouth	Tampa Bay Lightning
7	223	Samuel Lipkin^{†}	Quinnipiac	Arizona Coyotes

† incoming freshman
