= 2020–21 Yale Bulldogs men's ice hockey season =

College ice hockey season

- Conference: ECAC Hockey
- Home ice: Ingalls Rink

Rankings
- USCHO.com: NR
- USA Today/ US Hockey Magazine: NR

Record

Coaches and captains
- Head coach: Keith Allain
- Assistant coaches: Josh Siembida; Paul Kirtland; Bill Maniscalco
- Captain: Phil Kemp

The 2020–21 Yale Bulldogs Men's ice hockey season would have been the 126th season of play for the program and the 60th season in the ECAC Hockey conference.

== Season ==
As a result of the ongoing COVID-19 pandemic the entire college ice hockey season was delayed. Despite the issues, Yale and most of ECAC Hockey were expecting to start playing some time in November. After the team had assembled and began practicing, however, a sizable number of Bulldog players tested positive for coronavirus. On October 16, Yale raised the campus alert status from green to yellow when the 18th member of the men's ice hockey team tested positive. Less than a month later, the Ivy League, Yale's primary conference, announced that it was cancelling all winter sports for 2020–21. Additionally the schools would not be participating in any Spring sports until the end of February. The announcement was not particularly surprising, considering that, unlike other conference, the Ivy League does not rely on revenue generated from its athletic programs.

Because the NCAA had previously announced that all winter sports athletes would retain whatever eligibility they possessed through at least the following year, none of Yale's players would lose a season of play. However, the NCAA also approved a change in its transfer regulations that would allow players to transfer and play immediately rather than having to sit out a season, as the rules previously required. Because of this, players who would have been members of Yale for the 2021 season had a pathway to leave the program and play for another university.

While all Ivy League teams were shut down, the cancellation of Yale's ice hockey season was particularly galling. World Wars, the Great Depression and even their own home rink burning down had never completely hindered the Elis before but, for the first time in 125 years, Yale University would not play an official ice hockey game due to COVID-19.

== Departures ==
Player	Position	Nationality	Cause
Will D'Orsi	Forward	United States	Graduation
Robbie DeMontis	Forward	Canada	Graduation
Matt Foley	Forward	United States	Graduation (signed with Wheeling Nailers)
Corbin Kaczperski	Goaltender	United States	Graduate transfer to Denver
Phil Kemp	Forward	United States	Signed professional contract (Edmonton Oilers)
Chandler Lindstrand	Defenseman	United States	Graduation
Evan Smith	Forward	Canada	Graduation
Mitchell Smith	Forward	Canada	Graduation
Jack St. Ivany	Defenseman	United States	Transferred to Boston College
Luke Stevens	Forward	United States	Graduation (signed with Wilkes-Barre/Scranton Penguins)
Billy Sweezey	Defenseman	United States	Graduation (signed with Wilkes-Barre/Scranton Penguins)

== Recruiting ==
Player	Position	Nationality	Age	Notes
Niklas Allain	Forward	United States	21	North Branford, CT
Ian Carpentier	Forward	United States	20	Worcester, MA
Reilly Connors	Forward	United States	20	Madison, CT
Ryan Conroy^{†}	Defenseman	Canada	19	Chestermere, AB
Nathan Reid^{†}	Goaltender	United States	20	Madison, WI
Ryan Stevens^{†}	Forward	United States	20	Duxbury, MA
Henry Wagner^{†}	Forward	United States	19	St. Louis, MO

† played junior hockey or equivalent during 2020–21 season.

== Roster ==
As of October 30, 2020.

No.	Nat.	Player	Class	Pos	Height	Weight	DoB	Hometown	Previous team	NHL rights
1	(United States)	Connor Hopkins	Sophomore	G	6' 1" (1.85 m)	185 lb (84 kg)	2000-03-09	Malden, Massachusetts	West Kelowna Warriors (BCHL)	—
3	(United States)	Michael Young	Sophomore	D	6' 1" (1.85 m)	210 lb (95 kg)	1998-08-21	Medford, Massachusetts	Vernon Vipers (BCHL)	—
5	(United States)	Brian Matthews	Senior	D	6' 0" (1.83 m)	195 lb (88 kg)	1998-04-21	Marshfield, Massachusetts	Omaha Lancers (USHL)	—
7	(United States)	Brandon Tabakin	Sophomore	D	5' 10" (1.78 m)	160 lb (73 kg)	2000-05-21	Woodbury, New York	Sioux Falls Stampede (USHL)	—
8	(Canada)	Ryan Conroy	Freshman	D	5' 9" (1.75 m)	175 lb (79 kg)	2001-02-06	Chestermere, Alberta	Spruce Grove Saints (AJHL)	—
9	(United States)	Henry Wagner	Freshman	F	5' 9" (1.75 m)	170 lb (77 kg)	2001-05-11	St. Louis, Missouri	Drayton Valley Thunder (AJHL)	—
10	(United States)	Reilly Connors	Freshman	F	6' 1" (1.85 m)	190 lb (86 kg)	2000-03-17	Madison, Connecticut	Bonnyville Pontiacs (AJHL)	—
11	(United States)	Niklas Allain	Freshman	F	6' 2" (1.88 m)	180 lb (82 kg)	1999-09-08	North Branford, Connecticut	Boston Junior Bruins (NCDC)	—
12	(United States)	Dante Palecco	Senior	F	5' 11" (1.8 m)	185 lb (84 kg)	1998-04-18	Whippany, New Jersey	Green Bay Gamblers (USHL)	—
14	(United States)	Ryan Stevens	Freshman	F	6' 0" (1.83 m)	185 lb (84 kg)	2000-03-04	Duxbury, Massachusetts	South Shore Kings (NCDC)	—
15	(Canada)	Kyle Johnson	Junior	F	5' 11" (1.8 m)	186 lb (84 kg)	1998-06-03	Port Moody, British Columbia	Prince George Spruce Kings (BCHL)	—
16	(United States)	Teddy Wooding	Sophomore	F	6' 0" (1.83 m)	180 lb (82 kg)	1999-12-30	Wrentham, Massachusetts	Vernon Vipers (BCHL)	—
17	(United States)	Kevin O'Neil	Senior	F	5' 11" (1.8 m)	180 lb (82 kg)	1998-02-23	Latham, New York	Madison Capitols (USHL)	—
18	(United States)	Justin Pearson	Junior	F	6' 1" (1.85 m)	185 lb (84 kg)	1998-05-17	Nashua, New Hampshire	Islanders Hockey Club (NCDC)	—
19	(Canada)	Quinton Ong	Sophomore	F	5' 10" (1.78 m)	170 lb (77 kg)	1999-07-23	Saskatoon, Saskatchewan	Canmore Eagles (AJHL)	—
20	(United States)	Curtis Hall	Junior	F	6' 3" (1.91 m)	210 lb (95 kg)	2000-04-26	Chagrin Falls, Ohio	Youngstown Phantoms (USHL)	BOS, 119th overall 2018
21	(Canada)	Tyler Welsh	Senior	F	5' 10" (1.78 m)	175 lb (79 kg)	1997-03-17	Whistler, British Columbia	Victoria Grizzlies (BCHL)	—
22	(United States)	Hayden Rowan	Sophomore	F	5' 9" (1.75 m)	175 lb (79 kg)	1999-01-22	Pemberville, Ohio	Trail Smoke Eaters (BCHL)	—
23	(United States)	Cole Donhauser	Sophomore	F	5' 11" (1.8 m)	180 lb (82 kg)	1999-12-27	Buffalo, New York	Chilliwack Chiefs (BCHL)	—
24	(United States)	Graham Lillibridge	Junior	D	5' 9" (1.75 m)	160 lb (73 kg)	1999-01-29	Geneva, Illinois	Chicago Steel (USHL)	—
25	(United States)	Phil Kemp (C)	Senior	D	6' 3" (1.91 m)	210 lb (95 kg)	1999-02-12	Greenwich, Connecticut	USNTDP (USHL)	EDM, 208th overall 2017
26	(Canada)	Brett Jewell	Senior	F	6' 2" (1.88 m)	195 lb (88 kg)	1996-11-09	Vernon, British Columbia	Merritt Centennials (BCHL)	—
27	(United States)	Ian Carpentier	Freshman	F	6' 0" (1.83 m)	175 lb (79 kg)	2000-06-22	Worcester, Massachusetts	Boston Junior Bruins (NCDC)	—
29	(United States)	Nicholas MacNab	Senior	G	6' 2" (1.88 m)	185 lb (84 kg)	1996-07-15	Indianapolis, Indiana	Des Moines Buccaneers (USHL)	—
47	(United States)	Nathan Reid	Freshman	G	6' 2" (1.88 m)	195 lb (88 kg)	2000-07-12	Madison, Wisconsin	Sioux Falls Stampede (USHL)	—
	(United States)	Eddie Massaro	Senior	G	6' 0" (1.83 m)	180 lb (82 kg)	1998-06-16	Purchase, New York	Rye Country Day School (USHS–NY)	—

== Standings ==
2020–21 ECAC Hockey Standings
	Conference record											Overall record					
	GP	W	L	T	OTW	OTL	3/SW	PTS	PT%	GF	GA	GP	W	L	T	GF	GA
#11 Quinnipiac †	18	10	4	4	1	1	3	37	.685	54	34	29	17	8	4	100	59
#20 Clarkson	14	6	4	4	1	2	2	25	.595	29	25	22	11	7	4	62	52
St. Lawrence *	14	4	8	2	1	1	1	15	.357	30	37	17	6	8	3	40	45
Colgate	18	5	9	4	1	0	1	16	.352	34	51	22	6	11	5	48	66
Brown	0	-	-	-	-	-	-	-	-	-	-	0	-	-	-	-	-
Cornell	0	-	-	-	-	-	-	-	-	-	-	0	-	-	-	-	-
Dartmouth	0	-	-	-	-	-	-	-	-	-	-	0	-	-	-	-	-
Harvard	0	-	-	-	-	-	-	-	-	-	-	0	-	-	-	-	-
Princeton	0	-	-	-	-	-	-	-	-	-	-	0	-	-	-	-	-
Rensselaer	0	-	-	-	-	-	-	-	-	-	-	0	-	-	-	-	-
Union	0	-	-	-	-	-	-	-	-	-	-	0	-	-	-	-	-
Yale	0	-	-	-	-	-	-	-	-	-	-	0	-	-	-	-	-
Championship: March 20, 2021 † indicates conference regular season champion (Cleary Cup) * indicates conference tournament champion (Whitelaw Cup); Rankings: USCHO.com Top 20 Poll

== Schedule and results ==
Season Cancelled
