= 2020–21 Union Dutchmen ice hockey season =

- Conference: ECAC Hockey
- Home ice: Achilles Center

Rankings
- USCHO: NR
- USA Today: NR

Record

Coaches and captains
- Head coach: Rick Bennett
- Assistant coaches: John Ronan

The 2020–21 Union Dutchmen ice hockey season would have been the 80th season of play for the program and the 30th season in the ECAC Hockey conference.

== Season ==
As a result of the ongoing COVID-19 pandemic the entire college ice hockey season was delayed. Despite the issues, Union and most of ECAC Hockey was expecting to start playing some time in November. On October 16, Yale raised the campus alert status from green to yellow when the 18th member of the men's ice hockey team tested positive for coronavirus. Less than a month later, the Ivy League, the primary conference for 6 ECAC programs, announced that it was cancelling all winter sports for 2020–21. Additionally the schools would not be participating in any Spring sports until the end of February. While Union was not bound by the IVY League's ruling, the other capitol-district school Rensselaer cancelled its season on November 16 and Union followed suit the following day.

Because the NCAA had previously announced that all winter sports athletes would retain whatever eligibility they possessed through at least the following year, none of Union's players would lose a season of play. However, the NCAA also approved a change in its transfer regulations that would allow players to transfer and play immediately rather than having to sit out a season, as the rules previously required.

== Departures ==
| Player | Position | Nationality | Cause |
|---|---|---|---|
| Jack Adams | Forward | United States | Transfer (Providence) |
| Lucas Breault | Forward | Canada | Returned to Juniors (Salmon Arm Silverbacks) |
| Zachary Emelifeonwu | Forward | Canada | Graduation |
| Parker Foo | Forward | Canada | Signed Professional Contract (HC Kunlun Red Star) |
| Josh Graziano | Goaltender | United States | Returned to Juniors (New Mexico Ice Wolves) |
| Darion Hanson | Goaltender | United States | Transferred to (Connecticut) |
| Vas Kolias | Defenseman | United States | Graduation |
| Sam Morton | Forward | United States | Transfer (Minnesota State) |
| Ben Pirko | Defenseman | United States | Transfer (Trinity) |
| Anthony Rinaldi | Forward | Canada | Graduation (signed with Kansas City Mavericks) |
| Colin Schmidt | Forward | United States | Transfer (Minnesota) |

== Recruiting ==
| Player | Position | Nationality | Age | Notes |
|---|---|---|---|---|
| Trevor Adams | Forward | United States | 21 | Muskegon, MI |
| Ville Immonen | Forward | Finland | 21 | Seinäjoki, FIN |
| Nathan Kelly^{†} | Defenseman | Canada | 19 | South Delta, BC |
| Gleb Murtazin | Forward | Russia | 19 | Penza, RUS |
| Nic Petruolo | Defenseman | United States | 20 | Neshanic, NJ |
| Bram Scheerer | Forward | United States | 21 | Edina, MN |
| Tyler Watkins | Forward | United States | 20 | Hermantown, MN |

† played junior hockey or equivalent during 2020–21 season.

== Roster ==
As of January 25, 2021.

| No. | Nat. | Player | Class | Pos | Height | Weight | DoB | Hometown | Previous team | NHL rights |
|---|---|---|---|---|---|---|---|---|---|---|
| 1 | (United States) | Garrett Nieto | Sophomore | G | 6' 4" (1.93 m) | 245 lb (111 kg) | 1998-05-15 | Yorba Linda, California | Janesville Jets (NAHL) | — |
| 2 | (United States) | Taylor Brierley | Senior | D | 5' 10" (1.78 m) | 160 lb (73 kg) | 1996-07-31 | East Grand Forks, Minnesota | Dubuque Fighting Saints (USHL) | — |
| 4 | (United States) | Joseph Campolieto | Senior | D | 6' 0" (1.83 m) | 185 lb (84 kg) | 1998-04-29 | Eynon, Pennsylvania | Tri-City Storm (USHL) | — |
| 5 | (United States) | Nic Petruolo | Freshman | D | 5' 11" (1.8 m) | 180 lb (82 kg) | 2000-01-29 | Neshanic, New Jersey | Green Bay Gamblers (USHL) | — |
| 7 | (United States) | Brandon Estes | Senior | D | 6' 0" (1.83 m) | 175 lb (79 kg) | 1998-02-13 | Richardson, Texas | Youngstown Phantoms (USHL) | — |
| 8 | (United States) | Chaz Smedsrud | Sophomore | F | 6' 2" (1.88 m) | 195 lb (88 kg) | 1998-06-04 | Luverne, Minnesota | Madison Capitols (USHL) | — |
| 9 | (Russia) | Gleb Murtazin | Freshman | F | 6' 3" (1.91 m) | 198 lb (90 kg) | 2000-10-26 | Penza, Russia | Amarillo Bulls (NAHL) | — |
| 10 | (United States) | Ryan Sidorski | Junior | D | 6' 2" (1.88 m) | 195 lb (88 kg) | 1999-10-02 | Williamsville, New York | Buffalo Jr. Sabres (OJHL) | — |
| 11 | (Sweden) | Gabriel Seger | Sophomore | F | 6' 4" (1.93 m) | 216 lb (98 kg) | 1999-11-15 | Uppsala, Sweden | Amarillo Bulls (NAHL) | — |
| 12 | (United States) | Fletcher Fineman | Junior | D | 6' 3" (1.91 m) | 210 lb (95 kg) | 1999-02-17 | Lake Worth, Florida | Springfield Jr. Blues (NAHL) | — |
| 13 | (United States) | Tyler Watkins | Freshman | F | 5' 9" (1.75 m) | 175 lb (79 kg) | 1999-12-19 | Hermantown, Minnesota | Minnesota Wilderness (NAHL) | — |
| 14 | (United States) | Drew Blackmun | Senior | F | 6' 1" (1.85 m) | 190 lb (86 kg) | 1996-01-18 | Minneapolis, Minnesota | Northeastern (HEA) | — |
| 16 | (United States) | Christian Sanda | Sophomore | F | 6' 0" (1.83 m) | 185 lb (84 kg) | 1998-03-13 | Vadnais Heights, Minnesota | Coquitlam Express (BCHL) | — |
| 17 | (United States) | Matt Allen | Sophomore | F | 6' 2" (1.88 m) | 187 lb (85 kg) | 1999-03-14 | Smithfield, Rhode Island | Boston Junior Bruins (NCDC) | — |
| 18 | (Finland) | Ville Immonen | Freshman | F | 6' 2" (1.88 m) | 188 lb (85 kg) | 1999-06-18 | Seinäjoki, Finland | Minot Minotauros (NAHL) | — |
| 19 | (Canada) | Liam Robertson | Sophomore | F | 6' 5" (1.96 m) | 175 lb (79 kg) | 2000-05-14 | Courtice, Ontario | Youngstown Phantoms (USHL) | — |
| 21 | (United States) | Michael Ryan | Junior | D | 5' 11" (1.8 m) | 175 lb (79 kg) | 1997-01-19 | Marion, Massachusetts | West Kelowna Warriors (BCHL) | — |
| 23 | (United States) | Trevor Adams | Freshman | F | 5' 9" (1.75 m) | 174 lb (79 kg) | 1999-08-19 | Muskegon, Michigan | Chilliwack Chiefs (BCHL) | — |
| 24 | (United States) | Alex Cohen | Sophomore | F | 6' 0" (1.83 m) | 180 lb (82 kg) | 1998-06-15 | Boca Raton, Florida | Northeast Generals (NAHL) | — |
| 25 | (United States) | Owen Farris | Sophomore | F | 6' 3" (1.91 m) | 212 lb (96 kg) | 2000-06-08 | Dallas, Texas | Muskegon Lumberjacks (USHL) | — |
| 26 | (Canada) | Nathan Kelly | Freshman | D | 5' 11" (1.8 m) | 180 lb (82 kg) | 2000-11-22 | South Delta, British Columbia | Chilliwack Chiefs (BCHL) | — |
| 27 | (Canada) | Josh Kosack | Senior | F | 6' 0" (1.83 m) | 180 lb (82 kg) | 1997-06-25 | Oakville, Ontario | Green Bay Gamblers (USHL) | — |
| 28 | (Canada) | Dylan Anhorn | Sophomore | D | 6' 0" (1.83 m) | 175 lb (79 kg) | 1999-01-21 | Calgary, Alberta | Prince George Spruce Kings (BCHL) | — |
| 29 | (United States) | Sean Harrison | Senior | F | 5' 11" (1.8 m) | 175 lb (79 kg) | 1996-03-29 | Anchorage, Alaska | Central Illinois Flying Aces (USHL) | — |
| 33 | (Canada) | Merek Pipes | Sophomore | G | 5' 11" (1.8 m) | 170 lb (77 kg) | 1998-11-12 | Cobble Hill, British Columbia | Swan Valley Stampeders (MJHL) | — |
| 63 | (United States) | Bram Scheerer | Freshman | F | 6' 3" (1.91 m) | 185 lb (84 kg) | 1999-06-03 | Edina, Minnesota | Minnesota Wilderness (NAHL) | — |

== Standings ==
2020–21 ECAC Hockey Standings
| | Conference record | | | | | | | | | | | Overall record | | | | | |
| | GP | W | L | T | OTW | OTL | 3/SW | PTS | PT% | GF | GA | GP | W | L | T | GF | GA |
|---|---|---|---|---|---|---|---|---|---|---|---|---|---|---|---|---|---|
| #11 Quinnipiac † | 18 | 10 | 4 | 4 | 1 | 1 | 3 | 37 | .685 | 54 | 34 | 29 | 17 | 8 | 4 | 100 | 59 |
| #20 Clarkson | 14 | 6 | 4 | 4 | 1 | 2 | 2 | 25 | .595 | 29 | 25 | 22 | 11 | 7 | 4 | 62 | 52 |
| St. Lawrence * | 14 | 4 | 8 | 2 | 1 | 1 | 1 | 15 | .357 | 30 | 37 | 17 | 6 | 8 | 3 | 40 | 45 |
| Colgate | 18 | 5 | 9 | 4 | 1 | 0 | 1 | 16 | .352 | 34 | 51 | 22 | 6 | 11 | 5 | 48 | 66 |
| Brown | 0 | - | - | - | - | - | - | - | - | - | - | 0 | - | - | - | - | - |
| Cornell | 0 | - | - | - | - | - | - | - | - | - | - | 0 | - | - | - | - | - |
| Dartmouth | 0 | - | - | - | - | - | - | - | - | - | - | 0 | - | - | - | - | - |
| Harvard | 0 | - | - | - | - | - | - | - | - | - | - | 0 | - | - | - | - | - |
| Princeton | 0 | - | - | - | - | - | - | - | - | - | - | 0 | - | - | - | - | - |
| Rensselaer | 0 | - | - | - | - | - | - | - | - | - | - | 0 | - | - | - | - | - |
| Union | 0 | - | - | - | - | - | - | - | - | - | - | 0 | - | - | - | - | - |
| Yale | 0 | - | - | - | - | - | - | - | - | - | - | 0 | - | - | - | - | - |
Championship: March 20, 2021 † indicates conference regular season champion (Cleary Cup) * indicates conference tournament champion (Whitelaw Cup); Rankings: USCHO.com Top 20 Poll

== Schedule and results ==
Season Cancelled

== Awards and honors ==
| Player | Award | Ref |
|---|---|---|
| Josh Kosack | Derek Hines Unsung Hero Award | |
