= 2020–21 Cornell Big Red men's ice hockey season =

Collegiate ice hockey season

- Conference: ECAC Hockey
- Home ice: Lynah Rink

Rankings
- USCHO: NR
- USA Today: NR

Record

Coaches and captains
- Head coach: Mike Schafer
- Assistant coaches: Ben Syer; Sean Flanagan; Mitch Stephens

The 2020–21 Cornell Big Red Men's ice hockey season would have been the 105th season of play for the program and the 60th season in the ECAC Hockey conference. The Big Red represented Cornell University and played their home games at Lynah Rink in Ithaca, New York.

== Season ==
As a result of the ongoing COVID-19 pandemic the entire college ice hockey season was delayed. Despite the issues, Cornell and most of ECAC Hockey were expecting to start playing some time in November. After the teams had assembled and began practicing, however, a sizable number of Yale's players tested positive for coronavirus. On October 16, Yale raised the campus alert status from green to yellow when the 18th member of the men's ice hockey team tested positive. Less than a month later, the Ivy League, Cornell's primary conference, announced that it was cancelling all winter sports for 2020–21. Additionally the schools would not be participating in any Spring sports until the end of February. The announcement was not particularly surprising, considering that, unlike other conferences, the Ivy League does not rely on revenue generated from its athletic programs.

Because the NCAA had previously announced that all winter sports athletes would retain whatever eligibility they possessed through at least the following year, none of Cornell's players would lose a season of play. However, the NCAA also approved a change in its transfer regulations that would allow players to transfer and play immediately rather than having to sit out a season, as the rules previously required. Because of this, players who would have been members of Cornell for the 2021 season had a pathway to leave the program and immediately play for another university.

== Departures ==
Player	Position	Nationality	Cause
Morgan Barron	Forward	Canada	Signed professional contract (New York Rangers)
Noah Bauld	Forward	Canada	Graduation
Matt Cairns	Forward	Canada	Transfer (Minnesota–Duluth)
Cam Donaldson	Defenseman	United States	Transfer (Massachusetts)
Alex Green	Defenseman	United States	Signed Professional Contract (Tampa Bay Lightning)
Yanni Kaldis	Defenseman	Canada	Graduation (signed with Bakersfield Condors)
Jeff Malott	Forward	Canada	Graduation (signed with Manitoba Moose)
Peter Muzyka	Defenseman	Canada	Returned to Juniors (New Mexico Ice Wolves)

== Recruiting ==
Player	Position	Nationality	Age	Notes
Jack Lagerstrom	Defenseman	United States	20	Edina, MN
Jack O'Leary^{†}	Forward	United States	20	Smithtown, NY
Kyle Penney^{†}	Forward	Canada	20	Cole Harbour, NS
Tim Rego^{†}	Defenseman	United States	19	Mansfield, MA

† played junior hockey or equivalent during the 2020–21 season

== Roster ==
As of October 7, 2020

No.	Nat.	Player	Class	Pos	Height	Weight	DoB	Hometown	Previous team	NHL rights
3	(United States)	Cody Haiskanen	Senior	D	6' 4" (1.93 m)	198 lb (90 kg)	1997-03-27	Fargo, North Dakota	Fargo Force (USHL)	—
4	(Canada)	Joe Leahy	Junior	D	6' 4" (1.93 m)	192 lb (87 kg)	1997-04-29	Waterloo, Ontario	Salmon Arm Silverbacks (BCHL)	—
5	(Canada)	Sebastian Dirven	Sophomore	D	6' 3" (1.91 m)	196 lb (89 kg)	1998-06-22	Bainsville, Ontario	Central Illinois Flying Aces (USHL)	—
7	(United States)	Cam Donaldson	Senior	F	5' 8" (1.73 m)	169 lb (77 kg)	1998-07-14	Pittsboro, North Carolina	Powell River Kings (BCHL)	—
8	(United States)	Jack Lagerstrom	Freshman	D	6' 2" (1.88 m)	185 lb (84 kg)	2000-03-30	Edina, Minnesota	Tri-City Storm (USHL)	—
9	(United States)	Jack O'Leary	Freshman	F	5' 7" (1.7 m)	160 lb (73 kg)	2000-03-28	St. James, New York	Cedar Rapids RoughRiders (USHL)	—
10	(United States)	Travis Mitchell	Sophomore	D	6' 3" (1.91 m)	205 lb (93 kg)	1999-11-25	South Lyon, Michigan	Omaha Lancers (USHL)	—
11	(Canada)	Kyle Betts	Senior	F	6' 1" (1.85 m)	177 lb (80 kg)	1997-09-17	Flesherton, Ontario	Powell River Kings (BCHL)	—
12	(United States)	Tim Rego	Freshman	D	6' 0" (1.83 m)	175 lb (79 kg)	2000-10-31	Mansfield, Massachusetts	Brooks Bandits (AJHL)	—
13	(United States)	Jack Malone	Sophomore	F	6' 1" (1.85 m)	190 lb (86 kg)	2000-10-13	Madison, New Jersey	Youngstown Phantoms (USHL)	VAN, 180th overall 2019
14	(Canada)	Ben Tupker	Sophomore	F	6' 3" (1.91 m)	191 lb (87 kg)	1999-12-23	Collingwood, Ontario	Carleton Place Canadians (CCHL)	—
15	(Russia)	Max Andreev	Junior	F	6' 0" (1.83 m)	184 lb (83 kg)	1998-10-22	Moscow, Russia	Central Illinois Flying Aces (USHL)	—
17	(Canada)	Zach Bramwell	Junior	F	6' 1" (1.85 m)	192 lb (87 kg)	1999-05-09	Hamilton, Ontario	Oakville Blades (OJHL)	—
18	(China)	Misha Song	Junior	D	6' 1" (1.85 m)	183 lb (83 kg)	1997-01-31	Beijing, China	Madison Capitols (USHL)	NYI, 172nd overall 2015
19	(Canada)	Michael Regush	Junior	F	6' 1" (1.85 m)	211 lb (96 kg)	1998-09-12	Surrey, British Columbia	Youngstown Phantoms (USHL)	—
20	(Canada)	Matt Stienburg	Sophomore	F	6' 2" (1.88 m)	186 lb (84 kg)	2000-10-07	Halifax, Nova Scotia	St. Andrew's College (CISAA)	COL, 63rd overall 2019
21	(Canada)	Zach Tupker	Sophomore	F	6' 1" (1.85 m)	187 lb (85 kg)	1999-12-23	Collingwood, Ontario	Carleton Place Canadians (CCHL)	—
22	(Canada)	Kyle Penney	Freshman	F	6' 1" (1.85 m)	195 lb (88 kg)	2000-07-18	Lawrencetown, Nova Scotia	Chilliwack Chiefs (BCHL)	—
23	(Canada)	Liam Motley	Junior	F	6' 3" (1.91 m)	203 lb (92 kg)	1997-05-08	Calgary, Alberta	Whitecourt (AJHL)	—
24	(United States)	Sam Malinski	Sophomore	D	5' 11" (1.8 m)	190 lb (86 kg)	1998-07-27	Lakeville, Minnesota	Bismarck Bobcats (NAHL)	—
26	(Canada)	Tristan Mullin	Senior	F	6' 2" (1.88 m)	196 lb (89 kg)	1996-10-09	Cartwright, Manitoba	Powell River Kings (BCHL)	—
28	(Canada)	Brenden Locke	Senior	F	5' 10" (1.78 m)	177 lb (80 kg)	1997-10-09	Iroquois Falls, Ontario	Cobourg Cougars (OJHL)	—
29	(Canada)	Ben Berard	Sophomore	F	6' 0" (1.83 m)	192 lb (87 kg)	1999-02-13	Duncan, British Columbia	Powell River Kings (BCHL)	—
32	(Canada)	Austin McGrath	Senior	G	6' 1" (1.85 m)	179 lb (81 kg)	1998-02-10	Lloydminster, Alberta	Lloydminster Bobcats (AJHL)	—
33	(Canada)	Nate McDonald	Junior	G	6' 2" (1.88 m)	181 lb (82 kg)	1999-08-11	North Bay, Ontario	Markham Royals (OJHL)	—
35	(Canada)	Matthew Galajda	Senior	G	6' 0" (1.83 m)	192 lb (87 kg)	1997-10-07	Aurora, Ontario	Victoria Grizzlies (BCHL)	—

== Standings ==
2020–21 ECAC Hockey Standings
	Conference record											Overall record					
	GP	W	L	T	OTW	OTL	3/SW	PTS	PT%	GF	GA	GP	W	L	T	GF	GA
#11 Quinnipiac †	18	10	4	4	1	1	3	37	.685	54	34	29	17	8	4	100	59
#20 Clarkson	14	6	4	4	1	2	2	25	.595	29	25	22	11	7	4	62	52
St. Lawrence *	14	4	8	2	1	1	1	15	.357	30	37	17	6	8	3	40	45
Colgate	18	5	9	4	1	0	1	16	.352	34	51	22	6	11	5	48	66
Brown	0	-	-	-	-	-	-	-	-	-	-	0	-	-	-	-	-
Cornell	0	-	-	-	-	-	-	-	-	-	-	0	-	-	-	-	-
Dartmouth	0	-	-	-	-	-	-	-	-	-	-	0	-	-	-	-	-
Harvard	0	-	-	-	-	-	-	-	-	-	-	0	-	-	-	-	-
Princeton	0	-	-	-	-	-	-	-	-	-	-	0	-	-	-	-	-
Rensselaer	0	-	-	-	-	-	-	-	-	-	-	0	-	-	-	-	-
Union	0	-	-	-	-	-	-	-	-	-	-	0	-	-	-	-	-
Yale	0	-	-	-	-	-	-	-	-	-	-	0	-	-	-	-	-
Championship: March 20, 2021 † indicates conference regular season champion (Cleary Cup) * indicates conference tournament champion (Whitelaw Cup); Rankings: USCHO.com Top 20 Poll

== Schedule and results ==
Season cancelled

== Awards and honors ==
Player	Award	Ref
Kyle Betts	ECAC Hockey Student-Athlete of the Year	

== Players drafted into the NHL ==
=== 2021 NHL entry draft ===
Round	Pick	Player	NHL team
3	79	Justin Ertel^{†}	Dallas Stars
7	208	Hank Kempf^{†}	New York Rangers

† incoming freshman Source:
