= 2020–21 Princeton Tigers men's ice hockey season =

- Conference: ECAC Hockey
- Home ice: Hobey Baker Memorial Rink

Rankings
- USCHO.com: NR
- USA Today/ US Hockey Magazine: NR

Record

Coaches and captains
- Head coach: Ron Fogarty
- Assistant coaches: Brad Dexter; Tommy Davis

The 2020–21 Princeton Tigers Men's ice hockey season would have been the 119th season of play for the program and the 60th season in the ECAC Hockey conference. The Tigers represent the Princeton University and played their home games at the Hobey Baker Memorial Rink.

== Season ==
As a result of the COVID-19 pandemic the entire college ice hockey season was delayed. Despite the issues, Princeton and most of ECAC Hockey were expecting to start playing some time in November. After the teams had assembled and began practicing, however, a sizable number of Yale's players tested positive for coronavirus. On October 16, Yale raised the campus alert status from green to yellow when the 18th member of the men's ice hockey team tested positive. Less than a month later, the Ivy League, Princeton's primary conference, announced that it was cancelling all winter sports for 2020–21. Additionally the schools would not be participating in any Spring sports until the end of February. The announcement was not particularly surprising, considering that, unlike other conference, the Ivy League does not rely on revenue generated from its athletic programs.

Because the NCAA had previously announced that all winter sports athletes would retain whatever eligibility they possessed through at least the following year, none of Princeton's players would lose a season of play. However, the NCAA also approved a change in its transfer regulations that would allow players to transfer and play immediately rather than having to sit out a season, as the rules previously required. Because of this, players who would have been members of Princeton for the 2021 season had a pathway to leave the program and immediately play for another university.

== Departures ==
Player	Position	Nationality	Cause
Jackson Cressey	Forward	Canada	Graduation (signed with Tyringe SoSS)
Joey Fallon	Forward	United States	Graduation
Jordan Fogarty	Forward	United States	Graduation (signed with Virserums SGF)
Jeremy Germain	Forward	United States	Graduation
Liam Grande	Forward	Canada	Graduation (signed with Alfta GIF)
Luke Keenan	Forward	Canada	Left University
Matthew Thom	Defenseman	Canada	Graduation
Derek Topatigh	Defenseman	Canada	Graduation (signed with Macon Mayhem)

== Recruiting ==
Player	Position	Nationality	Age	Notes
Joe Berg	Forward	United States	20	Plano, TX
Nick Carabin	Defenseman	United States	20	Mahwah, NJ
Mike Kennedy	Defenseman	United States	20	Holyoke, MA
MacKenzie Merriman^{†}	Forward	Canada	20	White Rock, BC
Ian Murphy	Forward	United States	21	Braintree, MA

† played junior hockey or equivalent during 2020–21 season.

== Roster ==
As of October 14, 2020.

No.	Nat.	Player	Class	Pos	Height	Weight	DoB	Hometown	Previous team	NHL rights
1	(Canada)	Jérémie Forget	Junior	G	6' 1" (1.85 m)	185 lb (84 kg)	1997-10-15	Mascouche, Quebec	Carleton Place Canadians (CCHL)	—
2	(United States)	Mike Ufberg	Junior	D	5' 9" (1.75 m)	180 lb (82 kg)	1997-09-24	Richboro, Pennsylvania	Vernon Vipers (BCHL)	—
3	(United States)	Mike Kennedy	Freshman	D	6' 1" (1.85 m)	190 lb (86 kg)	2000-07-17	Holyoke, Massachusetts	Nanaimo Clippers (BCHL)	—
6	(Canada)	Matt Kellenberger	Junior	D	6' 1" (1.85 m)	185 lb (84 kg)	1999-01-11	Toronto, Ontario	Oakville Blades (OJHL)	—
7	(United States)	Nick Carabin	Freshman	D	5' 10" (1.78 m)	175 lb (79 kg)	2000-04-30	Mahwah, New Jersey	Coquitlam Express (BCHL)	—
8	(Canada)	Sami Pharaon	Junior	D	5' 10" (1.78 m)	170 lb (77 kg)	1999-05-28	North Vancouver, British Columbia	Alberni Valley Bulldogs (BCHL)	—
9	(Canada)	Mackenzie Merriman	Freshman	F	5' 11" (1.8 m)	190 lb (86 kg)	2000-04-14	White Rock, British Columbia	Nanaimo Clippers (BCHL)	—
11	(United States)	Adam Robbins	Sophomore	F	5' 8" (1.73 m)	155 lb (70 kg)	2000-04-12	New York, New York	Chicago Steel (USHL)	—
12	(United States)	Ian Murphy	Freshman	F	5' 11" (1.8 m)	176 lb (80 kg)	1999-04-06	Scituate, Massachusetts	Tri-City Storm (USHL)	—
13	(United States)	Nick Seitz	Sophomore	F	6' 1" (1.85 m)	190 lb (86 kg)	2000-01-18	Manhattan, New York	Corpus Christi IceRays (NAHL)	—
14	(United States)	Liam Gorman	Sophomore	F	6' 3" (1.91 m)	197 lb (89 kg)	2000-05-08	Arlington, Massachusetts	Saint Sebastian's School (USHS–MA)	PIT, 177th overall 2018
15	(Canada)	Spencer Kersten	Sophomore	F	5' 10" (1.78 m)	185 lb (84 kg)	2000-05-16	Waterloo, Ontario	Oakville Blades (OJHL)	—
16	(Canada)	Finn Evans	Junior	F	6' 4" (1.93 m)	185 lb (84 kg)	1999-08-21	Toronto, Ontario	Ottawa Jr. Senators (CCHL)	—
17	(Canada)	Reid Yochim	Senior	D	5' 7" (1.7 m)	180 lb (82 kg)	1998-06-21	Port Robinson, Ontario	Langley Rivermen (BCHL)	—
18	(Canada)	Matt Hayami	Sophomore	F	5' 10" (1.78 m)	185 lb (84 kg)	2000-05-21	Oakville, Ontario	Markham Royals (OJHL)	—
19	(Canada)	Neil Doef	Senior	F	5' 11" (1.8 m)	175 lb (79 kg)	1997-02-10	Smiths Falls, Ontario	Smiths Falls Bears (CCHL)	—
20	(United States)	Christian O'Neill	Junior	F	5' 11" (1.8 m)	175 lb (79 kg)	1998-06-17	Westwood, Massachusetts	Omaha Lancers (USHL)	—
21	(United States)	Pito Walton	Sophomore	D	6' 2" (1.88 m)	192 lb (87 kg)	2000-03-17	Peapack, New Jersey	Coquitlam Express (BCHL)	—
22	(Canada)	Colin Tonge	Senior	F	5' 10" (1.78 m)	185 lb (84 kg)	1998-02-10	Kingston, Ontario	Brockville Braves (CCHL)	—
23	(United States)	Joe Berg	Freshman	F	5' 11" (1.8 m)	185 lb (84 kg)	1999-10-07	Plano, Texas	Tri-City Storm (USHL)	—
26	(United States)	Jake Paganelli (A)	Senior	F	5' 11" (1.8 m)	175 lb (79 kg)	1997-03-28	Verona, New Jersey	Fargo Force (USHL)	—
27	(Canada)	Corey Andonovski	Junior	F	6' 1" (1.85 m)	195 lb (88 kg)	1999-03-26	Uxbridge, Ontario	Chilliwack Chiefs (BCHL)	—
30	(United States)	Ryan Ferland	Senior	G	6' 0" (1.83 m)	175 lb (79 kg)	1998-02-11	Franklin, Massachusetts	New Jersey Titans (NAHL)	—
35	(United States)	Aidan Porter	Sophomore	G	6' 2" (1.88 m)	180 lb (82 kg)	1999-05-18	Weston, Massachusetts	Vernon Vipers (BCHL)	—

== Standings ==
2020–21 ECAC Hockey Standings
	Conference record											Overall record					
	GP	W	L	T	OTW	OTL	3/SW	PTS	PT%	GF	GA	GP	W	L	T	GF	GA
#11 Quinnipiac †	18	10	4	4	1	1	3	37	.685	54	34	29	17	8	4	100	59
#20 Clarkson	14	6	4	4	1	2	2	25	.595	29	25	22	11	7	4	62	52
St. Lawrence *	14	4	8	2	1	1	1	15	.357	30	37	17	6	8	3	40	45
Colgate	18	5	9	4	1	0	1	16	.352	34	51	22	6	11	5	48	66
Brown	0	-	-	-	-	-	-	-	-	-	-	0	-	-	-	-	-
Cornell	0	-	-	-	-	-	-	-	-	-	-	0	-	-	-	-	-
Dartmouth	0	-	-	-	-	-	-	-	-	-	-	0	-	-	-	-	-
Harvard	0	-	-	-	-	-	-	-	-	-	-	0	-	-	-	-	-
Princeton	0	-	-	-	-	-	-	-	-	-	-	0	-	-	-	-	-
Rensselaer	0	-	-	-	-	-	-	-	-	-	-	0	-	-	-	-	-
Union	0	-	-	-	-	-	-	-	-	-	-	0	-	-	-	-	-
Yale	0	-	-	-	-	-	-	-	-	-	-	0	-	-	-	-	-
Championship: March 20, 2021 † indicates conference regular season champion (Cleary Cup) * indicates conference tournament champion (Whitelaw Cup); Rankings: USCHO.com Top 20 Poll

== Schedule and results ==
Season Cancelled
