= 2020–21 Dartmouth Big Green men's ice hockey season =

- Conference: ECAC Hockey
- Home ice: Thompson Arena

Rankings
- USCHO.com: NR
- USA Today/ US Hockey Magazine: NR

Record

Coaches and captains
- Head coach: Reid Cashman
- Assistant coaches: Jason Tapp; Stavros Paskaris

The 2020–21 Dartmouth Big Green Men's ice hockey season would have been the 115th season of play for the program and the 60th season in the ECAC Hockey conference. The Big Green represent Dartmouth College.

== Season ==
As a result of the ongoing COVID-19 pandemic the entire college ice hockey season was delayed. Despite the issues, Dartmouth and most of ECAC Hockey were expecting to start playing some time in November. After the teams had assembled and began practicing, however, a sizable number of Yale's players tested positive for coronavirus. On October 16, Yale raised the campus alert status from green to yellow when the 18th member of the men's ice hockey team tested positive. Less than a month later, the Ivy League, Dartmouth's primary conference, announced that it was cancelling all winter sports for 2020–21. Additionally the schools would not be participating in any Spring sports until the end of February. The announcement was not particularly surprising, considering that, unlike other conference, the Ivy League does not rely on revenue generated from its athletic programs.

Because the NCAA had previously announced that all winter sports athletes would retain whatever eligibility they possessed through at least the following year, none of Dartmouth's players would lose a season of play. However, the NCAA also approved a change in its transfer regulations that would allow players to transfer and play immediately rather than having to sit out a season, as the rules previously required. Because of this, players who would have been members of Dartmouth for the 2021 season had a pathway to leave the program and immediately play for another university.

== Departures ==
Player	Position	Nationality	Cause
Ryan Blankemeier	Forward	United States	Graduation
Adrian Clark	Goaltender	Canada	Graduation
Ben DiMaio	Defenseman	United States	Graduation
Will Graber	Forward/Defenseman	United States	Graduation (signed with Hershey Bears)
Clay Han	Defenseman	United States	Graduation
Drew O'Connor	Forward	United States	Signed Professional Contract (Pittsburgh Penguins)
Dean Shatzer	Goaltender	United States	Graduation
Cam Strong	Forward	United States	Graduation
Daniel Warpecha	Forward	United States	Graduation

== Recruiting ==
Player	Position	Nationality	Age	Notes
Tyler Borsch^{†}	Defenseman	United States	20	Maple Grove, MN
Troy Burkhart	Goaltender	United States	19	Tampa, FL
Luke House^{†}	Forward	United States	20	Chicago, IL
Ryan Lovett	Forward	United States	20	Franklin, MA
Joey Musa	Goaltender	United States	19	Orange Park, FL
Ryan Sorkin^{†}	Forward	United States	19	Chicago, IL
Clay Stevenson	Goaltender	Canada	21	Chilliwack, BC
Nick Unruh	Forward	Canada	20	Fort McMurray, AB
Josh Waters^{†}	Forward	United States	20	Collegeville, PA

† played junior hockey or equivalent during 2020–21 season.

== Roster ==
As of September 11, 2020.

No.	Nat.	Player	Class	Pos	Height	Weight	DoB	Hometown	Previous team	NHL rights
2	(United States)	Harrison Markell	Junior	D	6' 1" (1.85 m)	185 lb (84 kg)	1997-02-12	Andover, Massachusetts	Boston Junior Bruins (NCDC)	—
3	(United States)	Joey Matthews	Senior	D	5' 10" (1.78 m)	190 lb (86 kg)	1997-06-24	Columbia, Illinois	Sioux City Musketeers (NAHL)	—
4	(United States)	Tyler Borsch	Freshman	D	6' 0" (1.83 m)	185 lb (84 kg)	2000-03-27	Maple Grove, Minnesota	Jersey Hitmen (NCDC)	—
5	(United States)	Brock Paul	Sophomore	D	6' 3" (1.91 m)	205 lb (93 kg)	1999-11-10	Carmel, Indiana	Waterloo Black Hawks (USHL)	—
6	(United States)	Tanner Palocsik	Sophomore	D	5' 11" (1.8 m)	190 lb (86 kg)	1999-05-26	Aliquippa, Pennsylvania	Jersey Hitmen (NCDC)	—
7	(Canada)	Jack Cameron	Sophomore	D	6' 3" (1.91 m)	190 lb (86 kg)	1999-04-18	Halifax, Nova Scotia	Coquitlam Express (BCHL)	—
8	(United States)	Joey Musa	Freshman	F	5' 9" (1.75 m)	160 lb (73 kg)	2000-06-11	Orange Park, Florida	Langley Rivermen (BCHL)	—
9	(United States)	Collin Rutherford	Senior	F	5' 8" (1.73 m)	165 lb (75 kg)	1997-12-29	Tonawanda, New York	Des Moines Buccaneers (USHL)	—
10	(United States)	Ryan Sorkin	Freshman	F	5' 10" (1.78 m)	175 lb (79 kg)	2001-06-13	Chicago, Illinois	New Jersey Rockets (NCDC)	—
11	(United States)	Mark Gallant	Sophomore	F	6' 0" (1.83 m)	185 lb (84 kg)	2000-05-01	Concord, Massachusetts	Langley Rivermen (BCHL)	—
12	(Canada)	Nick Unruh	Freshman	F	6' 3" (1.91 m)	205 lb (93 kg)	2000-04-03	Fort McMurray, Alberta	Salmon Arm Silverbacks (BCHL)	—
14	(Canada)	Matt Baker	Senior	F	5' 11" (1.8 m)	175 lb (79 kg)	1997-02-21	Barrie, Ontario	Wenatchee Wild (BCHL)	—
16	(Canada)	Tyler Campbell	Sophomore	F	5' 9" (1.75 m)	170 lb (77 kg)	1999-10-01	Winnipeg, Manitoba	Brooks Bandits (AJHL)	—
17	(United States)	Quin Foreman	Senior	F	6' 3" (1.91 m)	200 lb (91 kg)	1996-05-25	Needham, Massachusetts	West Kelowna Warriors (BCHL)	—
18	(United States)	Josh Waters	Freshman	F	5' 11" (1.8 m)	175 lb (79 kg)	2000-01-23	Collegeville, Pennsylvania	Jersey Hitmen (NCDC)	—
19	(United States)	Luke House	Freshman	F	6' 3" (1.91 m)	185 lb (84 kg)	2000-07-08	Chicago, Illinois	New Jersey Rockets (NCDC)	—
20	(United States)	Erik Urbank	Junior	F	6' 2" (1.88 m)	195 lb (88 kg)	1999-03-28	Orchard Park, New York	Chicago Steel (USHL)	—
21	(United States)	Christian LeSueur	Junior	F	5' 10" (1.78 m)	175 lb (79 kg)	1999-01-07	Greenwich, Connecticut	Brunswick School (USHS–CT)	—
22	(United States)	Sam Hesler	Junior	F	6' 1" (1.85 m)	190 lb (86 kg)	1998-06-06	Boxborough, Massachusetts	Wenatchee Wild (BCHL)	—
24	(United States)	Brendan Less	Senior	D	5' 11" (1.8 m)	170 lb (77 kg)	1998-04-24	Kinnelon, New Jersey	Jersey Hitmen (USPHL)	—
26	(United States)	Jeff Losurdo	Junior	F	6' 0" (1.83 m)	185 lb (84 kg)	1998-03-09	Elmhurst, Illinois	Jersey Hitmen (NCDC)	—
27	(United States)	Brendan Demler (C)	Senior	D	6' 2" (1.88 m)	195 lb (88 kg)	1997-08-18	Lebanon, Ohio	Des Moines Buccaneers (USHL)	—
28	(United States)	Ryan Lovett	Freshman	F	6' 2" (1.88 m)	200 lb (91 kg)	1999-07-06	Franklin, Massachusetts	Boston Junior Bruins (NCDC)	—
29	(United States)	Sean Keohan	Sophomore	D	5' 11" (1.8 m)	180 lb (82 kg)	1999-02-09	Milton, Massachusetts	Boston Junior Bruins (NCDC)	—
30	(United States)	Troy Burkhart	Freshman	G	6' 1" (1.85 m)	170 lb (77 kg)	2001-03-20	Tampa, Florida	Henry B. Plant High School (USHS–FL)	—
31	(United States)	Justin Ferguson	Junior	G	6' 2" (1.88 m)	165 lb (75 kg)	1997-08-06	Hudson, New Hampshire	Islanders Hockey Club (NCDC)	—
35	(Canada)	Clay Stevenson	Freshman	G	6' 4" (1.93 m)	195 lb (88 kg)	1999-03-03	Port Coquitlam, British Columbia	Coquitlam Express (BCHL)	—

== Standings ==
2020–21 ECAC Hockey Standings
	Conference record											Overall record					
	GP	W	L	T	OTW	OTL	3/SW	PTS	PT%	GF	GA	GP	W	L	T	GF	GA
#11 Quinnipiac †	18	10	4	4	1	1	3	37	.685	54	34	29	17	8	4	100	59
#20 Clarkson	14	6	4	4	1	2	2	25	.595	29	25	22	11	7	4	62	52
St. Lawrence *	14	4	8	2	1	1	1	15	.357	30	37	17	6	8	3	40	45
Colgate	18	5	9	4	1	0	1	16	.352	34	51	22	6	11	5	48	66
Brown	0	-	-	-	-	-	-	-	-	-	-	0	-	-	-	-	-
Cornell	0	-	-	-	-	-	-	-	-	-	-	0	-	-	-	-	-
Dartmouth	0	-	-	-	-	-	-	-	-	-	-	0	-	-	-	-	-
Harvard	0	-	-	-	-	-	-	-	-	-	-	0	-	-	-	-	-
Princeton	0	-	-	-	-	-	-	-	-	-	-	0	-	-	-	-	-
Rensselaer	0	-	-	-	-	-	-	-	-	-	-	0	-	-	-	-	-
Union	0	-	-	-	-	-	-	-	-	-	-	0	-	-	-	-	-
Yale	0	-	-	-	-	-	-	-	-	-	-	0	-	-	-	-	-
Championship: March 20, 2021 † indicates conference regular season champion (Cleary Cup) * indicates conference tournament champion (Whitelaw Cup); Rankings: USCHO.com Top 20 Poll

== Schedule and results ==
Season Cancelled

== Players drafted into the NHL ==
=== 2021 NHL entry draft ===
Round	Pick	Player	NHL team
7	211	Robert Flinton^{†}	Tampa Bay Lightning

† incoming freshman
