= 2020–21 RPI Engineers men's ice hockey season =

American sporting competition

- Conference: ECAC Hockey
- Home ice: Houston Field House

Rankings
- USCHO: NR
- USA Today: NR

Record

Coaches and captains
- Head coach: Dave Smith
- Assistant coaches: Scott Moser; Chuck Weber; Nate Skidmore

The 2020–21 RPI Engineers Men's ice hockey season would have been the 102nd season of play for the program and the 60th season in the ECAC Hockey conference. The Engineers represent Rensselaer Polytechnic Institute, and play their home games at Houston Field House.

== Season ==
On July 1, 2020, Rensselaer announced that all of its athletic programs would be suspended for the fall semester due to concerns over the COVID-19 pandemic. The school did not make a determination on the fate of their spring semester at the time and said that the final decision on winter and spring sports would be made in due course. After 18 members of Yale's ice hockey team tested positive in October, the season for all college hockey teams was put in jeopardy. Less than a month later the Ivy League made the decision to cancel all winter sports. As a result of that decision, which cut ECAC Hockey in half for the 2020–21 season, Rensselaer elected to follow suit and cancel their season as well on November 16.

== Departures ==
Player	Position	Nationality	Cause
Tristan Ashbrook	Forward	United States	Transfer (Michigan Tech)
Shane Bear	Forward	United States	Graduation
Todd Burgess	Forward	United States	Graduate Transfer (Minnesota State)
Mike Gornall	Forward	Canada	Graduation (signed with Knoxville Ice Bears)
Jake Marrello	Forward	United States	Graduation
Patrick Polino	Forward	United States	Graduation
Will Reilly	Defenseman	United States	Graduation (signed with Wilkes-Barre/Scranton Penguins)
T. J. Samec	Defenseman	United States	Graduation
Owen Savory	Goaltender	Canada	Transfer (Massachusetts–Lowell)
Chase Zieky	Defenseman	United States	Graduation

== Recruiting ==
Player	Position	Nationality	Age	Notes
John Beaton	Forward	Canada	19	Stittsville, ON
Jack Brackett^{†}	Forward	United States	19	Manassas, VA
Dylan Davies	Forward	United States	19	Traverse City, MI
Jake Gagnon	Forward	Canada	20	Pointe-Claire, PQ
James McIsaac	Forward	Canada	21	Winnipeg, MB
Altti Nykänen	Forward	Finland	19	Vihti, FIN
Henri Schreifels^{†}	Forward	United States	20	Agoura Hills, CA
Shane Sellar	Forward	United States	23	Transfer from Dartmouth
Lauri Sertti	Defenseman	Finland	21	Espoo, FIN

† played junior hockey or equivalent during 2020–21 season.

== Roster ==
As of January 26, 2021.

No.	Nat.	Player	Class	Pos	Height	Weight	DoB	Hometown	Previous team	NHL rights
1	(Canada)	Linden Marshall	Senior	G	6' 3" (1.91 m)	195 lb (88 kg)	1998-07-21	Victoria, British Columbia	Trail Smoke Eaters (BCHL)	—
2	(United States)	Simon Kjellberg	Sophomore	D	6' 3" (1.91 m)	190 lb (86 kg)	2000-02-17	Nashville, Tennessee	Dubuque Fighting Saints (USHL)	NYR, 163rd overall 2018
3	(Finland)	Lauri Sertti	Freshman	D	6' 1" (1.85 m)	190 lb (86 kg)	1999-07-11	Espoo, Finland	Amarillo Bulls (NAHL)	—
4	(United States)	Mason Klee	Sophomore	D	6' 2" (1.88 m)	195 lb (88 kg)	1999-10-04	Morrison, Colorado	Sioux Falls Stampede (USHL)	—
6	(United States)	Brady Ferner	Junior	D	5' 10" (1.78 m)	190 lb (86 kg)	1997-08-27	Dakota Dunes, South Dakota	Sioux City Musketeers (USHL)	—
7	(United States)	Nick Bowman	Junior	F	6' 0" (1.83 m)	200 lb (91 kg)	1997-12-19	Shelby, Michigan	Coulee Region Chill (NAHL)	—
8	(Canada)	James McIsaac	Freshman	F	5' 10" (1.78 m)	175 lb (79 kg)	1999-04-29	Winnipeg, Manitoba	Brooks Bandits (AJHL)	—
10	(United States)	Dylan Davies	Freshman	D	6' 3" (1.91 m)	195 lb (88 kg)	2001-02-09	Traverse City, Michigan	Sioux Falls Stampede (USHL)	—
11	(Finland)	Ottoville Leppänen	Junior	F	5' 10" (1.78 m)	185 lb (84 kg)	1998-06-18	Espoo, Finland	Espoo Blues U20 (Nuorten SM-liiga)	—
12	(United States)	Henri Schreifels	Freshman	F	6' 1" (1.85 m)	195 lb (88 kg)	2000-07-01	Newbury Park, California	Victoria Grizzlies (BCHL)	—
13	(Canada)	Tommy Lee	Junior	F	5' 8" (1.73 m)	160 lb (73 kg)	1997-12-07	Calgary, Alberta	Chilliwack Chiefs (BCHL)	—
14	(United States)	Zach Dubinsky	Sophomore	F	5' 8" (1.73 m)	175 lb (79 kg)	2000-03-14	Highland Park, Illinois	Lincoln Stars (USHL)	—
15	(Finland)	Altti Nykänen	Freshman	F	6' 3" (1.91 m)	185 lb (84 kg)	2001-09-26	Vihti, Finland	Bishop's College School (CISAA)	—
16	(United States)	Rory Herrman	Sophomore	F	6' 0" (1.83 m)	200 lb (91 kg)	1999-03-16	Poway, California	Fargo Force (USHL)	—
17	(Canada)	John Beaton	Freshman	F	6' 1" (1.85 m)	190 lb (86 kg)	2000-10-30	Stittsville, Ontario	Youngstown Phantoms (USHL)	—
18	(United States)	Daniel DiGrande	Junior	F	5' 11" (1.8 m)	180 lb (82 kg)	1997-08-05	Macomb, Michigan	Green Bay Gamblers (USHL)	—
19	(United States)	Ture Linden	Junior	F	6' 0" (1.83 m)	190 lb (86 kg)	1997-07-06	Great Falls, Virginia	Lone Star Brahmas (NAHL)	—
20	(United States)	Billy Jerry	Senior	F	6' 4" (1.93 m)	190 lb (86 kg)	1997-11-21	River Falls, Wisconsin	Madison Capitols (USHL)	—
21	(United States)	Louie Helsen	Sophomore	D	6' 2" (1.88 m)	200 lb (91 kg)	1998-06-08	Dallas, Texas	Amarillo Bulls (NAHL)	—
22	(Canada)	Cory Babichuk	Sophomore	D	5' 10" (1.78 m)	175 lb (79 kg)	1998-09-28	Edmonton, Alberta	Spruce Grove Saints (AJHL)	—
23	(United States)	Jake Johnson	Junior	D	6' 0" (1.83 m)	185 lb (84 kg)	1998-08-13	Bloomington, Minnesota	Cedar Rapids RoughRiders (USHL)	—
24	(United States)	Jack Brackett	Freshman	F	5' 10" (1.78 m)	180 lb (82 kg)	2000-12-31	Manassas, Virginia	Powell River Kings (BCHL)	—
25	(Canada)	Ryan Mahshie	Sophomore	F	6' 3" (1.91 m)	210 lb (95 kg)	1999-04-05	Stoney Creek, Ontario	Brooks Bandits (AJHL)	—
26	(United States)	Shane Sellar	Graduate	F	6' 3" (1.91 m)	200 lb (91 kg)	1997-06-14	Carlisle, Pennsylvania	Dartmouth (ECAC)	—
27	(Canada)	Jake Gagnon	Freshman	F	5' 10" (1.78 m)	170 lb (77 kg)	1999-11-04	Pointe-Claire	Wellington Dukes (OJHL)	—
28	(United States)	Kyle Hallbauer	Junior	D	5' 11" (1.8 m)	190 lb (86 kg)	1997-03-02	Howell, New Jersey	Lone Star Brahmas (NAHL)	—
30	(United States)	Brett Miller	Freshman	G	6' 0" (1.83 m)	185 lb (84 kg)	1999-04-26	Northville, Michigan	Austin Bruins (NAHL)	—
38	(United States)	Alec Calvaruso	Senior	G	6' 2" (1.88 m)	180 lb (82 kg)	1998-07-09	Livonia, Michigan	Sioux Falls Stampede (USHL)	—
39	(Slovakia)	Jakub Lacka	Junior	F	6' 0" (1.83 m)	190 lb (86 kg)	1998-11-20	Bratislava, Slovakia	Central Illinois Flying Aces (USHL)	—

== Standings ==
2020–21 ECAC Hockey Standings
	Conference record											Overall record					
	GP	W	L	T	OTW	OTL	3/SW	PTS	PT%	GF	GA	GP	W	L	T	GF	GA
#11 Quinnipiac †	18	10	4	4	1	1	3	37	.685	54	34	29	17	8	4	100	59
#20 Clarkson	14	6	4	4	1	2	2	25	.595	29	25	22	11	7	4	62	52
St. Lawrence *	14	4	8	2	1	1	1	15	.357	30	37	17	6	8	3	40	45
Colgate	18	5	9	4	1	0	1	16	.352	34	51	22	6	11	5	48	66
Brown	0	-	-	-	-	-	-	-	-	-	-	0	-	-	-	-	-
Cornell	0	-	-	-	-	-	-	-	-	-	-	0	-	-	-	-	-
Dartmouth	0	-	-	-	-	-	-	-	-	-	-	0	-	-	-	-	-
Harvard	0	-	-	-	-	-	-	-	-	-	-	0	-	-	-	-	-
Princeton	0	-	-	-	-	-	-	-	-	-	-	0	-	-	-	-	-
Rensselaer	0	-	-	-	-	-	-	-	-	-	-	0	-	-	-	-	-
Union	0	-	-	-	-	-	-	-	-	-	-	0	-	-	-	-	-
Yale	0	-	-	-	-	-	-	-	-	-	-	0	-	-	-	-	-
Championship: March 20, 2021 † indicates conference regular season champion (Cleary Cup) * indicates conference tournament champion (Whitelaw Cup); Rankings: USCHO.com Top 20 Poll

== Schedule and results ==
Season Cancelled
