= 2020–21 St. Lawrence Saints men's ice hockey season =

ECAC Tournament, Champion NCAA Tournament, Withdrawal
- Conference: 3rd ECAC Hockey
- Home ice: Appleton Arena

Rankings
- USCHO.com: NR
- USA Today/ US Hockey Magazine: NR

Record
- Overall: 6–8–3
- Conference: 4–8–2
- Home: 1–5–2
- Road: 5–3–1
- Neutral: 0–0–0

Coaches and captains
- Head coach: Brent Brekke
- Assistant coaches: Ben Murphy; Tommy Hill
- Captain(s): Callum Cusinato; Dylan Woolf

The 2020–21 St. Lawrence Saints Men's ice hockey season was the 81st season of play for the program and the 60th season in the ECAC Hockey conference. The Saints represented the St. Lawrence University and were coached by Brent Brekke, in his 2nd season.

== Season ==
As a result of the ongoing COVID-19 pandemic the entire college ice hockey season was delayed. Because the NCAA had previously announced that all winter sports athletes would retain whatever eligibility they possessed through at least the following year, none of St. Lawrence's players would lose a season of play. However, the NCAA also approved a change in its transfer regulations that would allow players to transfer and play immediately rather than having to sit out a season, as the rules previously required.

After an abysmal season, St. Lawrence continued to see a great deal of roster turnover as the program recovered from Mark Morris's tenure. The Saints got a late start to the season, even after the delay due to COVID, but the team played surprisingly well once they got on the ice. buoyed by the play of junior netminder Emil Zetterquist, SLU gave opponents fits throughout the season, holding at least a .500 record until February when the team ran into league-leading Quinnipiac and lost four consecutive matches against the Bobcats. Even with the losses, however, St. Lawrence kept the score close and demonstrated great strides by a team that had finished last in the ECAC for three consecutive years.

St. Lawrence's final matchup of the regular season was cancelled when Clarkson ended their season due to COVID protocol violations. The Saints ended in 3rd place, giving them a home game for the ECAC Tournament. Ordinarily this would have been seen as a positive for the team, but St. Lawrence hadn't won a single home game through 7 games. Despite the recent history, SLU produced its largest offensive output of the season and defeated Colgate 5–4 in overtime. The Saints found themselves playing for a chance to go to the NCAA Tournament despite a 5–8–3 record and got out to an early lead. Quinnipiac took over in the second and then tried to play in a defensive shell for the remainder of the contest but the Larries scored late and then David Jankowski scored the game-winner in the fourth minute of overtime.

The miraculous, albeit short, run for the Saints gave them their first league championship in 20 years and their first tournament berth since 2007. Unfortunately, everything came crashing to a halt a day later when Brent Brekke tested positive for COVID-19 and St. Lawrence was forced to withdraw from the tournament. St. Lawrence was just the second ECAC Tournament champion to not play in the NCAA Tournament and the second time a team declined an automatic invitation to a national tournament, the previous time for both was by Harvard in 1963.

Grant Adams and Luke Erickson sat out the season.

== Departures ==
Player	Position	Nationality	Cause
Carson Dimoff	Forward	United States	Left program
Ryan Garvey	Forward	Canada	Graduation
Carson Gicewicz	Forward	United States	Transferred to Massachusetts
Alex Gilmour	Forward	Canada	Graduation (Signed with Birmingham Bulls)
Cade Gleekel	Forward	United States	Left program
Bo Hanson	Defenseman	United States	Transferred to Denver
Michael Laidley	Forward	Canada	Graduation (Signed with Pensacola Ice Flyers)
Daniel Mannella	Goaltender	Canada	Graduation
Ted McGeen	Forward	Canada	Transferred to Guelph
Andrew McIntyre	Forward	Canada	Left program
Eddie Pavlini	Forward	United States	Left program
Zac Risteau	Forward	United States	Transferred to St. Thomas
Keenan Suthers	Forward	Canada	Transferred to Maine

== Recruiting ==
Player	Position	Nationality	Age	Notes
Grant Adams	Goaltender	United States	20	Niles, MI
Max Dorrington	Forward	United States	19	North Reading, MA
Luke Erickson	Defenseman	United States	21	Woodbury, MN
Greg Lapointe	Forward	Canada	19	Granby, QC
Tucker McIntosh	Defenseman	Canada	19	Toronto, ON
Reilly Moran	Forward	United States	20	Hingham, MA
Justin Paul	Forward	Canada	20	Thunder Bay, ON
Logan Ritchie	Forward	United States	21	O'Fallon, MO
Luc Salem	Defenseman	United States	21	Los Angeles, CA
Nick Trela	Forward	United States	21	Trenton, MI

== Roster ==
As of December 31, 2020.

No.	Nat.	Player	Class	Pos	Height	Weight	DoB	Hometown	Previous team	NHL rights
1	(Sweden)	Emil Zetterquist	Junior	G	6' 1" (1.85 m)	190 lb (86 kg)	1998-09-21	Stockholm, Sweden	Coulee Region Chill (NAHL)	—
2	(United States)	Dylan Woolf (C)	Senior	D	6' 1" (1.85 m)	205 lb (93 kg)	1996-05-03	Victoria, Minnesota	Lincoln Stars (USHL)	—
3	(United States)	Mark Mahoney	Junior	D	5' 11" (1.8 m)	185 lb (84 kg)	1999-05-08	Canton, New York	Hotchkiss School (USHS–CT)	—
4	(Canada)	Cameron White	Senior	D	6' 3" (1.91 m)	200 lb (91 kg)	1997-03-12	Toronto, Ontario	Ottawa Jr. Senators (CCHL)	—
7	(United States)	Luc Salem	Freshman	D	5' 10" (1.78 m)	175 lb (79 kg)	1999-07-09	Santa Monica, California	Topeka Pilots (NAHL)	—
9	(United States)	Luke Erickson	Freshman	D	6' 2" (1.88 m)	210 lb (95 kg)	1999-04-15	Woodbury, Minnesota	Fairbanks Ice Dogs (NAHL)	—
10	(Canada)	David Jankowski	Junior	F	6' 1" (1.85 m)	175 lb (79 kg)	1997-05-25	Waterdown, Ontario	Hawkesbury Hawks (CCHL)	—
12	(Canada)	Greg Lapointe	Freshman	F	5' 9" (1.75 m)	175 lb (79 kg)	2001-01-01	Granby, Quebec	Coquitlam Express (BCHL)	—
13	(Finland)	Aleksi Peltonen	Sophomore	F	5' 10" (1.78 m)	180 lb (82 kg)	1998-06-08	Helsinki, Finland	Omaha Lancers (USHL)	—
14	(Canada)	Justin Paul	Freshman	F	5' 11" (1.8 m)	188 lb (85 kg)	2000-04-10	Thunder Bay, Ontario	Wellington Dukes (OJHL)	—
15	(United States)	Jacob Nielsen	Senior	F	6' 0" (1.83 m)	180 lb (82 kg)	1998-02-21	New Berlin, Wisconsin	Lincoln Stars (USHL)	—
16	(United States)	Nicholas Wildgoose	Sophomore	F	5' 10" (1.78 m)	185 lb (84 kg)	1999-12-07	Cary, North Carolina	Rockland Nationals (CCHL)	—
17	(United States)	Reilly Moran	Freshman	F	5' 11" (1.8 m)	176 lb (80 kg)	2000-04-24	Hingham, Massachusetts	Powell River Kings (BCHL)	—
18	(United States)	Kaden Pickering	Junior	F	5' 9" (1.75 m)	180 lb (82 kg)	1998-12-17	Madrid, New York	Chilliwack Chiefs (BCHL)	—
19	(United States)	Max Dorrington	Freshman	F	6' 3" (1.91 m)	205 lb (93 kg)	2001-08-30	North Reading, Massachusetts	Cushing Academy (USHS–MA)	—
20	(United States)	Nicholas Trela	Freshman	F	6' 2" (1.88 m)	185 lb (84 kg)	1999-08-26	Trenton, Michigan	Amarillo Bulls (NAHL)	—
21	(United States)	Cameron Buhl	Sophomore	F	5' 10" (1.78 m)	184 lb (83 kg)	1998-12-03	South St. Paul, Minnesota	Minnesota Magicians (NAHL)	—
22	(Canada)	Jeff Clarke	Junior	D	6' 4" (1.93 m)	215 lb (98 kg)	1999-04-15	London, Ontario	Oakville Blades (OJHL)	—
23	(United States)	Ashton Fry	Sophomore	F	5' 11" (1.8 m)	185 lb (84 kg)	1998-07-16	Highlands Ranch, Colorado	Kemptville 73's (CCHL)	—
24	(Canada)	Tucker McIntosh	Freshman	D	6' 1" (1.85 m)	175 lb (79 kg)	2001-05-20	Toronto, Ontario	Ottawa Jr. Senators (CCHL)	—
27	(United States)	Logan Ritchie	Freshman	F	5' 11" (1.8 m)	180 lb (82 kg)	1999-07-27	O'Fallon, Missouri	Kenai River Brown Bears (NAHL)	—
28	(Canada)	Callum Cusinato (C)	Senior	F	6' 2" (1.88 m)	205 lb (93 kg)	1998-09-29	Toronto, Ontario	Toronto Jr. Canadiens (OJHL)	—
29	(United States)	Jordan Steinmetz	Sophomore	F	5' 8" (1.73 m)	160 lb (73 kg)	1999-01-10	Chippewa Falls, Wisconsin	Sioux City Musketeers (USHL)	—
31	(Canada)	Francis Boisvert	Sophomore	G	6' 2" (1.88 m)	170 lb (77 kg)	1999-03-11	Blainville, Quebec	Ottawa Jr. Senators (CCHL)	—
32	(Sweden)	Philip Alftberg	Senior	D	5' 8" (1.73 m)	180 lb (82 kg)	1997-01-19	Märsta, Sweden	Fargo Force (USHL)	—
33	(United States)	Tim Makowski	Sophomore	D	6' 1" (1.85 m)	195 lb (88 kg)	1998-11-14	St. Louis, Missouri	Aberdeen Wings (NAHL)	—
35	(United States)	Grant Adams	Freshman	G	6' 2" (1.88 m)	195 lb (88 kg)	2000-09-22	South Bend, Indiana	Salmon Arm Silverbacks (BCHL)	—
44	(United States)	Jake Stevens	Senior	D	6' 2" (1.88 m)	205 lb (93 kg)	1996-12-06	Naperville, Illinois	Victoria Grizzlies (BCHL)	—

== Standings ==
2020–21 ECAC Hockey Standings
	Conference record											Overall record					
	GP	W	L	T	OTW	OTL	3/SW	PTS	PT%	GF	GA	GP	W	L	T	GF	GA
#11 Quinnipiac †	18	10	4	4	1	1	3	37	.685	54	34	29	17	8	4	100	59
#20 Clarkson	14	6	4	4	1	2	2	25	.595	29	25	22	11	7	4	62	52
St. Lawrence *	14	4	8	2	1	1	1	15	.357	30	37	17	6	8	3	40	45
Colgate	18	5	9	4	1	0	1	16	.352	34	51	22	6	11	5	48	66
Brown	0	-	-	-	-	-	-	-	-	-	-	0	-	-	-	-	-
Cornell	0	-	-	-	-	-	-	-	-	-	-	0	-	-	-	-	-
Dartmouth	0	-	-	-	-	-	-	-	-	-	-	0	-	-	-	-	-
Harvard	0	-	-	-	-	-	-	-	-	-	-	0	-	-	-	-	-
Princeton	0	-	-	-	-	-	-	-	-	-	-	0	-	-	-	-	-
Rensselaer	0	-	-	-	-	-	-	-	-	-	-	0	-	-	-	-	-
Union	0	-	-	-	-	-	-	-	-	-	-	0	-	-	-	-	-
Yale	0	-	-	-	-	-	-	-	-	-	-	0	-	-	-	-	-
Championship: March 20, 2021 † indicates conference regular season champion (Cleary Cup) * indicates conference tournament champion (Whitelaw Cup); Rankings: USCHO.com Top 20 Poll

== Schedule and results ==
Date	Time	Opponent^{#}	Rank^{#}	Site	TV	Decision	Result	Attendance	Record
Regular season
December 31	4:00 PM	vs. #12 Quinnipiac		Appleton Arena • Canton, New York		Zetterquist	T 2–2 ^{SOL}	0	0–0–1 (0–0–1)
January 3	1:00 PM	at #12 Quinnipiac		People's United Center • Hamden, Connecticut		Zetterquist	W 4–2	0	1–0–1 (1–0–1)
January 7	5:00 PM	at Colgate		Class of 1965 Arena • Hamilton, New York		Zetterquist	W 2–1	0	2–0–1 (2–0–1)
January 9	7:00 PM	vs. Colgate		Appleton Arena • Canton, New York		Zetterquist	L 2–4	0	2–1–1 (2–1–1)
January 10	5:00 PM	vs. Colgate		Appleton Arena • Canton, New York		Zetterquist	T 1–1 ^{SOW}	0	2–1–2 (2–1–2)
January 15	5:00 PM	at #15 Clarkson		Cheel Arena • Potsdam, New York		Zetterquist	W 2–1 ^{OT}	0	3–1–2 (3–1–2)
January 17	4:00 PM	vs. #15 Clarkson		Appleton Arena • Canton, New York		Zetterquist	L 1–2	0	3–2–2 (3–2–2)
January 21	5:00 PM	vs. Colgate		Appleton Arena • Canton, New York		Zetterquist	L 3–4 ^{OT}	0	3–3–2 (3–3–2)
January 23	6:00 PM	at Colgate		Class of 1965 Arena • Hamilton, New York		Zetterquist	W 4–3	0	4–3–2 (4–3–2)
January 24	4:00 PM	at Colgate		Class of 1965 Arena • Hamilton, New York		Boisvert	L 3–4	0	4–4–2 (4–4–2)
February 5	4:00 PM	at #12 Quinnipiac		People's United Center • Hamden, Connecticut		Zetterquist	L 1–4	0	4–5–2 (4–5–2)
February 6	4:00 PM	at #12 Quinnipiac		People's United Center • Hamden, Connecticut		Zetterquist	L 1–2	0	4–6–2 (4–6–2)
February 13	7:30 PM	at Sacred Heart*		Webster Bank Arena • Bridgeport, Connecticut		Zetterquist	T 2–2 ^{OT}	0	4–6–3
February 26	4:00 PM	vs. #12 Quinnipiac		Appleton Arena • Canton, New York		Zetterquist	L 2–4	0	4–7–3 (4–7–2)
February 27	4:00 PM	vs. #12 Quinnipiac		Appleton Arena • Canton, New York		Zetterquist	L 2–3	0	4–8–3 (4–8–2)
ECAC Hockey Tournament
March 18	5:00 PM	vs. Colgate*		Class of 1965 Arena • Hamilton, New York (ECAC Semifinal)		Zetterquist	W 5–4 ^{OT}	0	5–8–3
March 20	4:00 PM	vs. #10 Quinnipiac*		People's United Center • Hamden, Connecticut (ECAC Championship)		Zetterquist	W 3–2 ^{OT}	0	6–8–3
NCAA Tournament
St. Lawrence Withdrew due to COVID-19 positive
*Non-conference game. ^{#}Rankings from USCHO.com Poll. All times are in Eastern Time.

== Scoring statistics ==
Name	Position	Games	Goals	Assists	Points	PIM
Cameron Buhl	F	17	5	10	15	19
David Jankowski	C	15	4	8	12	0
Kaden Pickering	RW	17	7	4	11	6
Luc Salem	D	17	3	7	10	14
Greg Lapointe	F	17	4	5	9	6
Nicholas Trela	F	17	4	4	8	6
Justin Paul	LW	14	3	2	5	6
Philip Alftberg	D/RW	17	1	4	5	12
Tim Makowski	D	17	1	4	5	6
Reilly Moran	RW	16	1	3	4	4
Tucker McIntosh	D	6	2	1	3	6
Ashton Fry	F	16	2	1	3	14
Jordan Steinmetz	F	17	2	1	3	8
Dylan Woolf	D	12	1	2	3	16
Jake Stevens	D	16	0	2	2	12
Aleksi Peltonen	F	16	0	2	2	2
Callum Cusinato	C/LW	10	0	1	1	2
Jacob Nielsen	F	11	0	1	1	15
Jeff Clarke	D	11	0	1	1	4
Max Dorrington	F	14	0	1	1	6
Francis Boisvert	G	1	0	0	0	0
Nichlas Wildgoose	RW	2	0	0	0	0
Cameron White	D	4	0	0	0	0
Mark Mahoney	D	6	0	0	0	0
Logan Ritchie	F	15	0	0	0	0
Emil Zetterquist	G	16	0	0	0	0
Bench	36	-	-	-	-	2
Total			40	64	104	166

== Goaltending statistics ==
Name	Games	Minutes	Wins	Losses	Ties	Goals against	Saves	Shut outs	SV %	GAA
Emil Zetterquist	16	975	6	7	3	39	488	0	.926	2.40
Francis Boisvert	1	58	0	1	0	4	17	0	.810	4.09
Empty Net	-	16	-	-	-	2	-	-	-	-
Total	17	1050	6	8	3	45	505	0	.918	2.57

== Rankings ==
Poll	Week																					
Poll	Pre	1	2	3	4	5	6	7	8	9	10	11	12	13	14	15	16	17	18	19	20	21 (Final)
USCHO.com	NR	NR	NR	NR	NR	NR	NR	NR	NR	NR	NR	NR	NR	NR	NR	NR	NR	NR	NR	NR	-	NR
USA Today	NR	NR	NR	NR	NR	NR	NR	NR	NR	NR	NR	NR	NR	NR	NR	NR	NR	NR	NR	NR	NR	NR

USCHO did not release a poll in week 20.

== Awards and honors ==
Player	Award	Ref
David Jankowski	ECAC Hockey Most Outstanding Player in Tournament	
Cameron Buhl	ECAC Hockey First Team	
Luc Salem	ECAC Hockey Rookie Team	
Greg Lapointe	ECAC Hockey Rookie Team	
