= 2020–21 Harvard Crimson men's ice hockey season =

College ice hockey season

- Conference: ECAC Hockey
- Home ice: Bright-Landry Hockey Center

Rankings
- USCHO: NR
- USA Today: NR

Record

Coaches and captains
- Head coach: Ted Donato
- Assistant coaches: Jim Tortorella; James Marcou; Brian Robinson

The 2020–21 Harvard Crimson Men's ice hockey season would have been the 121st season of play for the program and the 60th season in the ECAC Hockey conference. The Crimson represent Harvard University.

== Season ==
As a result of the ongoing COVID-19 pandemic the entire college ice hockey season was delayed. Despite the issues, Harvard and most of ECAC Hockey were expecting to start playing some time in November. After the teams had assembled and began practicing, however, a sizable number of Yale's players tested positive for coronavirus. On October 16, Yale raised the campus alert status from green to yellow when the 18th member of the men's ice hockey team tested positive. Less than a month later, the Ivy League, Harvard's primary conference, announced that it was cancelling all winter sports for 2020–21. Additionally the schools would not be participating in any Spring sports until the end of February. The announcement was not particularly surprising, considering that, unlike other conference, the Ivy League does not rely on revenue generated from its athletic programs.

Because the NCAA had previously announced that all winter sports athletes would retain whatever eligibility they possessed through at least the following year, none of Harvard's players would lose a season of play. However, the NCAA also approved a change in its transfer regulations that would allow players to transfer and play immediately rather than having to sit out a season, as the rules previously required. Because of this, players who would have been members of Harvard for the 2021 season had a pathway to leave the program and immediately play for another university.

== Departures ==
| Player | Position | Nationality | Cause |
|---|---|---|---|
| Jack Badini | Forward | United States | Signed Professional Contract (Anaheim Ducks) |
| Henry Bowlby | Forward | United States | Signed Professional Contract (Florida Panthers) |
| Wyllum Deveaux | Forward | Canada | Returned to Juniors (West Kelowna Warriors); rejoined program for following year |
| Jack Drury | Defenseman | United States | Signed Professional Contract (Växjö Lakers) |
| Cameron Gornet | Goaltender | United States | Graduation |
| Frédéric Grégoire | Forward | Canada | Graduation |
| Colton Kerfoot | Forward | Canada | Graduation (signed with KOOVEE) |
| Nathan Krusko | Forward | United States | Graduation |
| Sihak Lee | Goaltender | United States | Graduation |
| Jack Rathbone | Defenseman | United States | Signed Professional Contract (Vancouver Canucks) |
| Justin Szeto | Forward | Canada | Graduation |
| Reilly Walsh | Defenseman | United States | Signed Professional Contract (New Jersey Devils) |

== Recruiting ==
| Player | Position | Nationality | Age | Notes |
|---|---|---|---|---|
| Ryan Drkulec^{†} | Forward | United States | 20 | Frisco, TX |
| Sean Farrell^{†} | Forward | United States | 18 | Hopkinton, MA; Selected 124th overall in 2020 NHL entry draft |
| John Fusco^{†} | Defenseman | United States | 19 | Westwood, MA; Selected 189th overall in 2020 NHL entry draft |
| Alex Laferriere^{†} | Defenseman | United States | 18 | Chatham, NJ; Selected 83rd overall in 2020 NHL entry draft |
| Max Miller | Goaltender | United States | 19 | Ann Arbor, MI |
| Derek Mullahy^{†} | Goaltender | United States | 19 | Scituate, MA |

† played junior hockey or equivalent during 2020–21 season.

== Roster ==
As of June 28, 2020.

| No. | Nat. | Player | Class | Pos | Height | Weight | DoB | Hometown | Previous team | NHL rights |
|---|---|---|---|---|---|---|---|---|---|---|
| 5 | (United States) | Nick Azar | Senior | D | 6' 3" (1.91 m) | 205 lb (93 kg) | 1997-01-13 | Grosse Pointe, Michigan | Tri-City Storm (USHL) | — |
| 7 | (United States) | R. J. Murphy | Junior | F | 6' 2" (1.88 m) | 190 lb (86 kg) | 1998-10-02 | Needham, Massachusetts | West Kelowna Warriors (BCHL) | — |
| 8 | (United States) | Benjamin Foley | Senior | D | 6' 1" (1.85 m) | 220 lb (100 kg) | 1996-11-30 | Edina, Minnesota | Cedar Rapids RoughRiders (USHL) | — |
| 9 | (United States) | Mitchell Perrault | Senior | F | 5' 9" (1.75 m) | 170 lb (77 kg) | 1996-09-03 | Findlay, Ohio | Sioux Falls Stampede (USHL) | — |
| 11 | (United States) | Benjamin Solin | Senior | F | 5' 10" (1.78 m) | 165 lb (75 kg) | 1997-07-21 | Madison, Connecticut | Nanaimo Clippers (BCHL) | — |
| 12 | (United States) | Jackson Hartje | Senior | D | 6' 0" (1.83 m) | 176 lb (80 kg) | 1996-08-08 | Detroit, Michigan | Shreveport Mudbugs (NAHL) | — |
| 14 | (United States) | Jace Foskey | Sophomore | D | 6' 2" (1.88 m) | 195 lb (88 kg) | 2000-06-01 | Southlake, Texas | Madison Capitols (USHL) | — |
| 15 | (United States) | John Murray | Sophomore | D | 5' 11" (1.8 m) | 174 lb (79 kg) | 2000-04-18 | Dorchester, Massachusetts | Noble & Greenough School (USHS–MA) | — |
| 16 | (United States) | Nick Abruzzese | Sophomore | F | 5' 9" (1.75 m) | 160 lb (73 kg) | 1999-06-04 | Slate Hill, New York | Chicago Steel (USHL) | TOR, 124th overall 2019 |
| 17 | (United States) | John Farinacci | Sophomore | F | 6' 0" (1.83 m) | 185 lb (84 kg) | 2001-02-14 | Red Bank, New Jersey | Dexter Southfield School (USHS–MA) | ARI, 76th overall 2019 |
| 22 | (United States) | Ryan Siedem | Sophomore | D | 6' 2" (1.88 m) | 192 lb (87 kg) | 2001-02-25 | Madison, New Jersey | Central Illinois Flying Aces (USHL) | — |
| 23 | (United States) | Baker Shore | Junior | F | 5' 11" (1.8 m) | 180 lb (82 kg) | 1999-08-20 | Englewood, Colorado | Chicago Steel (USHL) | — |
| 24 | (United States) | Buddy Mrowka | Senior | D | 5' 10" (1.78 m) | 170 lb (77 kg) | 1998-06-23 | Duxbury, Massachusetts | Milton Academy (USHS–MA) | — |
| 27 | (Canada) | Austin Wong | Sophomore | F | 5' 11" (1.8 m) | 190 lb (86 kg) | 2000-08-26 | Calgary, Alberta | Okotoks Oilers (AJHL) | WPG, 215th overall 2018 |
| 30 | (United States) | Derek Schaedig | Junior | G | 6' 4" (1.93 m) | 190 lb (86 kg) | 1998-05-13 | Chelsea, Michigan | Lincoln Stars (USHL) | — |
| 44 | (United States) | Mitchell Gibson | Sophomore | G | 6' 1" (1.85 m) | 187 lb (85 kg) | 1999-06-25 | Phoenixville, Pennsylvania | Central Illinois Flying Aces (USHL) | WSH, 124th overall 2018 |
| 46 | (Canada) | Marshall Rifai | Junior | D | 6' 1" (1.85 m) | 190 lb (86 kg) | 1998-03-16 | Beaconsfield, Quebec | Des Moines Buccaneers (USHL) | — |
| 47 | (United States) | Casey Dornbach | Junior | F | 5' 11" (1.8 m) | 180 lb (82 kg) | 1997-07-07 | Edina, Minnesota | Lincoln Stars (USHL) | — |
| 77 | (United States) | Henry Thrun | Sophomore | D | 6' 2" (1.88 m) | 195 lb (88 kg) | 2001-03-12 | Southborough, Massachusetts | USNTDP (USHL) | ANA, 101st overall 2019 |
| | (United States) | Ryan Drkulec | Freshman | F | 6' 6" (1.98 m) | 197 lb (89 kg) | 2000-09-22 | Mansfield, Texas | Des Moines Buccaneers (USHL) | — |
| | (United States) | Sean Farrell | Freshman | F | 5' 9" (1.75 m) | 175 lb (79 kg) | 2001-11-02 | Hopkinton, Massachusetts | Chicago Steel (USHL) | MTL, 124th overall 2020 |
| | (United States) | John Fusco | Freshman | D | 5' 11" (1.8 m) | 180 lb (82 kg) | 2001-06-13 | Westwood, Massachusetts | Dexter Southfield School (USHS–MA) | TOR, 189th overall 2020 |
| | (United States) | Alex Laferriere | Freshman | F | 6' 0" (1.83 m) | 178 lb (81 kg) | 2001-10-28 | Chatham, New Jersey | Des Moines Buccaneers (USHL) | LAK, 83rd overall 2020 |
| | (United States) | Max Miller | Freshman | G | 6' 2" (1.88 m) | 180 lb (82 kg) | 2001-08-02 | Ann Arbor, Michigan | Janesville Jets (NAHL) | — |
| | (United States) | Derek Mullahy | Freshman | G | 6' 0" (1.83 m) | 175 lb (79 kg) | 2001-03-20 | Scituate, Massachusetts | Cedar Rapids RoughRiders (USHL) | — |

== Standings ==
2020–21 ECAC Hockey Standings
| | Conference record | | | | | | | | | | | Overall record | | | | | |
| | GP | W | L | T | OTW | OTL | 3/SW | PTS | PT% | GF | GA | GP | W | L | T | GF | GA |
|---|---|---|---|---|---|---|---|---|---|---|---|---|---|---|---|---|---|
| #11 Quinnipiac † | 18 | 10 | 4 | 4 | 1 | 1 | 3 | 37 | .685 | 54 | 34 | 29 | 17 | 8 | 4 | 100 | 59 |
| #20 Clarkson | 14 | 6 | 4 | 4 | 1 | 2 | 2 | 25 | .595 | 29 | 25 | 22 | 11 | 7 | 4 | 62 | 52 |
| St. Lawrence * | 14 | 4 | 8 | 2 | 1 | 1 | 1 | 15 | .357 | 30 | 37 | 17 | 6 | 8 | 3 | 40 | 45 |
| Colgate | 18 | 5 | 9 | 4 | 1 | 0 | 1 | 16 | .352 | 34 | 51 | 22 | 6 | 11 | 5 | 48 | 66 |
| Brown | 0 | - | - | - | - | - | - | - | - | - | - | 0 | - | - | - | - | - |
| Cornell | 0 | - | - | - | - | - | - | - | - | - | - | 0 | - | - | - | - | - |
| Dartmouth | 0 | - | - | - | - | - | - | - | - | - | - | 0 | - | - | - | - | - |
| Harvard | 0 | - | - | - | - | - | - | - | - | - | - | 0 | - | - | - | - | - |
| Princeton | 0 | - | - | - | - | - | - | - | - | - | - | 0 | - | - | - | - | - |
| Rensselaer | 0 | - | - | - | - | - | - | - | - | - | - | 0 | - | - | - | - | - |
| Union | 0 | - | - | - | - | - | - | - | - | - | - | 0 | - | - | - | - | - |
| Yale | 0 | - | - | - | - | - | - | - | - | - | - | 0 | - | - | - | - | - |
Championship: March 20, 2021 † indicates conference regular season champion (Cleary Cup) * indicates conference tournament champion (Whitelaw Cup); Rankings: USCHO.com Top 20 Poll

== Schedule and results ==
Season Cancelled

== Players drafted into the NHL ==
=== 2021 NHL entry draft ===
| Round | Pick | Player | NHL team |
|---|---|---|---|
| 1 | 13 | Matthew Coronato^{†} | Calgary Flames |
| 5 | 137 | Aku Koskenvuo^{†} | Vancouver Canucks |
| 5 | 138 | Jack Bar^{†} | Dallas Stars |

† incoming freshman
