= 2021 ECAC Hockey men's ice hockey tournament =

2021 ECAC Men's ice hockey tournament
- Dates: March 18–20, 2021
- Teams: 3
- Finals site: People's United Center; Hamden, Connecticut
- Champions: St. Lawrence (7th title)
- Winning coach: Brent Brekke (1st title)
- MVP: David Jankowski (St. Lawrence)
- ECAC Men's Ice Hockey Tournaments

The 2021 ECAC Hockey Men's Ice Hockey Tournament will be the 60th tournament in league history. It was played between March 18 and March 20, 2021.As the tournament champion, St. Lawrence, received an automatic bid to the 2021 NCAA Division I Men's Ice Hockey Tournament.

== Format ==
With the majority of ECAC member schools opting out of competition for the 2020–21 season due to the COVID-19 pandemic, the format for the tournament was reduced to just four participating institutions. The format introduced would have the four programs compete in two single-elimination rounds over the course of one championship weekend. The semifinals will take place on March 18, and the championship game on March 20 at the site of the highest remaining seed.

On March 10, ECAC announced that Clarkson would not be participating in the tournament, due to COVID protocols. As a result, the format of the tournament was further reduced to just three teams. Top-seed Quinnipiac was awarded a bye to the Championship game and St. Lawrence will host Colgate in the lone semifinal.

== Conference standings ==
2020–21 ECAC Hockey Standings
	Conference record											Overall record					
	GP	W	L	T	OTW	OTL	3/SW	PTS	PT%	GF	GA	GP	W	L	T	GF	GA
#11 Quinnipiac †	18	10	4	4	1	1	3	37	.685	54	34	29	17	8	4	100	59
#20 Clarkson	14	6	4	4	1	2	2	25	.595	29	25	22	11	7	4	62	52
St. Lawrence *	14	4	8	2	1	1	1	15	.357	30	37	17	6	8	3	40	45
Colgate	18	5	9	4	1	0	1	16	.352	34	51	22	6	11	5	48	66
Brown	0	-	-	-	-	-	-	-	-	-	-	0	-	-	-	-	-
Cornell	0	-	-	-	-	-	-	-	-	-	-	0	-	-	-	-	-
Dartmouth	0	-	-	-	-	-	-	-	-	-	-	0	-	-	-	-	-
Harvard	0	-	-	-	-	-	-	-	-	-	-	0	-	-	-	-	-
Princeton	0	-	-	-	-	-	-	-	-	-	-	0	-	-	-	-	-
Rensselaer	0	-	-	-	-	-	-	-	-	-	-	0	-	-	-	-	-
Union	0	-	-	-	-	-	-	-	-	-	-	0	-	-	-	-	-
Yale	0	-	-	-	-	-	-	-	-	-	-	0	-	-	-	-	-
Championship: March 20, 2021 † indicates conference regular season champion (Cleary Cup) * indicates conference tournament champion (Whitelaw Cup); Rankings: USCHO.com Top 20 Poll

== Bracket ==
Semifinals; March 18			Championship; March 20
			1	Quinnipiac	2
3	St. Lawrence	5*	3	St. Lawrence	3*
4	Colgate	4

Note: * denotes overtime period(s)

== Results ==
=== Semifinal ===
==== (3) St. Lawrence vs. (4) Colgate ====
March 19, 2021; 2:00 PM	St. Lawrence	5 – 4 (OT) (1–1, 1–2, 2–1, 1–0)	Colgate	Appleton Arena, Canton, New York; Attendance: 0

Game reference

Emil Zetterquist
Goalies
Carter Gylander
Referees:
Brad Leblanc
Tom Steinel
Linesmen:
Patrick Dapuzzo
Brian Oliver

(Peltonen, Moran) Tucker McIntosh (1) – 04:17	1–0
	1–1	11:39 – SH – Josh McKechney (7) (Young, McDermott)
	1–2	26:17 – Jeff Stewart (3) (Brandon)
(Paul, Salem) Cameron Buhl (4) – PP – 09:15	2–2
	2–3	35:17 – Evan Tschumi (2) (Jeanson, McKechney)
(Dorrington) Dylan Woolf (1) – 44:36	3–3
(Jankowski, Trela) Tucker McIntosh (2) – 45:45	4–3
	4–4	50:13 – Tyler Jeanson (2) (Tschumi, Anderson)
(Lapointe) Cameron Buhl (5) – GW – 68:07	5–4

8 min
Penalties
4 min
25
Shots
43

=== Championship ===
==== (1) Quinnipiac vs. (3) St. Lawrence ====
March 20, 2021; 4:00 PM	Quinnipiac	2 – 3 (OT) (0–1, 2–0, 0–1, 0–1)	St. Lawrence	People's United Center, Hamden, Connecticut; Attendance: 0

Game reference

Keith Petruzzelli
Goalies
Emil Zetterquist
Referees:
Joe Carusone
C. J. Hanafin
Linesmen:
Ryan Knapp
Brian Oliver

	0–1	03:07 – Kaden Pickering (7) (Alftberg, Jankowski)
(de Jong, Metsa) Odeen Tufto (7) – 27:55	1–1
(Brind'Amour, Smilanic) Wyatt Bongiovanni (5) – 28:07	2–1
	2–2	56:22 – Justin Paul (3) (Salem, Stevens)
	2–3	63:44 – GW – David Jankowski (4) (Salem)

4 min
Penalties
6 min
26
Shots
28

== Tournament awards ==
=== Most Outstanding Player(s) ===
- David Jankowski
