= 2020–21 Brown Bears men's ice hockey season =

- Conference: ECAC Hockey
- Home ice: Meehan Auditorium

Rankings
- USCHO: NR
- USA Today: NR

Record

Coaches and captains
- Head coach: Brendan Whittet
- Assistant coaches: Jason Guerriero; Jason Smith; Ed Kesell

The 2020–21 Brown Bears Men's ice hockey season would have been the 104th season of play for the program and the 60th season in the ECAC Hockey conference. The Bears represent Brown University.

== Season ==
As a result of the ongoing COVID-19 pandemic the entire college ice hockey season was delayed. Despite the issues, Brown and most of ECAC Hockey were expecting to start playing some time in November. After the teams had assembled and began practicing, however, a sizable number of Yale's players tested positive for coronavirus. On October 16, Yale raised the campus alert status from green to yellow when the 18th member of the men's ice hockey team tested positive. Less than a month later, the Ivy League, Brown's primary conference, announced that it was cancelling all winter sports for 2020–21. Additionally the schools would not be participating in any Spring sports until the end of February. The announcement was not particularly surprising, considering that, unlike other conference, the Ivy League does not rely on revenue generated from its athletic programs.

Because the NCAA had previously announced that all winter sports athletes would retain whatever eligibility they possessed through at least the following year, none of Brown's players would lose a season of play. However, the NCAA also approved a change in its transfer regulations that would allow players to transfer and play immediately rather than having to sit out a season, as the rules previously required. Because of this, players who would have been members of Brown for the 2021 season had a pathway to leave the program and immediately play for another university.

== Departures ==
Player	Position	Nationality	Cause
Brent Beaudoin	Forward	United States	Graduation (signed with Worcester Railers)
Trey Dodd	Forward	United States	Graduation
Jack Gessert	Forward	United States	Graduation
Zach Giuttari	Defenseman	United States	Graduation (signed with Hartford Wolf Pack)
Luke Harrington	Forward	United States	Left Program
Gavin Nieto	Goaltender	United States	Graduation

== Recruiting ==
Player	Position	Nationality	Age	Notes
Tony Andreozzi	Defenseman	United States	20	Winchester, MA
James Durham	Goaltender	United States	21	Grand Rapids, MI
Matthew Kinash	Forward	Canada	20	Edmonton, AB; transferred to Massachusetts–Lowell
Jackson Munro^{†}	Defenseman	Canada	20	Vancouver, BC
Matthew Sutton	Forward	United States	20	Gibsonia, PA
Jordan Tonelli	Forward	Canada	20	Armonk, NY

† played junior hockey or equivalent during 2020–21 season.

== Roster ==
As of September 1, 2020.

No.	Nat.	Player	Class	Pos	Height	Weight	DoB	Hometown	Previous team	NHL rights
1	(United States)	James Durham	Freshman	G	6' 2" (1.88 m)	195 lb (88 kg)	1999-03-27	Grand Rapids, Michigan	Des Moines Buccaneers (USHL)	—
2	(United States)	Luke Krys	Sophomore	D	6' 2" (1.88 m)	185 lb (84 kg)	2000-09-27	Ridgefield, Connecticut	Salisbury School (USHS–CT)	—
3	(Canada)	Luke Albert	Sophomore	D	6' 2" (1.88 m)	201 lb (91 kg)	1998-08-17	Fergus, Ontario	Bonnyville Pontiacs (AJHL)	—
4	(United States)	Anea Ferrario (A)	Senior	D	6' 0" (1.83 m)	195 lb (88 kg)	1998-08-09	Ogden, Utah	Sioux City Musketeers (USHL)	—
5	(United States)	Ben Taylor	Senior	F	6' 3" (1.91 m)	205 lb (93 kg)	1997-04-25	Falmouth, Massachusetts	Nanaimo Clippers (BCHL)	—
6	(United States)	Tony Stillwell (C)	Senior	D	5' 9" (1.75 m)	170 lb (77 kg)	1997-04-18	Green Bay, Wisconsin	Green Bay Gamblers (USHL)	—
7	(United States)	Justin Jallen	Junior	F	5' 9" (1.75 m)	178 lb (81 kg)	1998-01-06	St. Paul, Minnesota	Northeast Generals (NAHL)	—
9	(United States)	Connor Marshall	Sophomore	F	5' 11" (1.8 m)	185 lb (84 kg)	1998-10-10	Parkland, Florida	Northeast (NAHL)	—
10	(United States)	Jonny Russell	Sophomore	F	5' 11" (1.8 m)	173 lb (78 kg)	1998-01-31	Traverse City, Michigan	Des Moines Buccaneers (USHL)	—
11	(Canada)	Nathan Plessis	Sophomore	F	6' 4" (1.93 m)	205 lb (93 kg)	1998-02-28	Salmon Arm, British Columbia	Brooks Bandits (AJHL)	—
12	(United States)	Matt Sutton	Freshman	F	5' 11" (1.8 m)	185 lb (84 kg)	2001-05-26	Pittsburgh, Pennsylvania	Omaha Lancers (USHL)	—
14	(United States)	Chris Berger	Senior	F	5' 9" (1.75 m)	175 lb (79 kg)	1998-04-14	Buffalo, New York	Des Moines Buccaneers (USHL)	—
15	(United States)	Tony Andreozzi	Freshman	D	5' 11" (1.8 m)	190 lb (86 kg)	2000-04-16	Winchester, Massachusetts	Salmon Arm Silverbacks (BCHL)	—
16	(Canada)	Tristan Crozier (C)	Junior	F	5' 11" (1.8 m)	184 lb (83 kg)	1998-02-23	Calgary, Alberta	Nanaimo Clippers (BCHL)	—
17	(Canada)	Bradley Cocca	Sophomore	F	5' 8" (1.73 m)	170 lb (77 kg)	1999-08-13	Toronto, Ontario	Merritt Centennials (BCHL)	—
18	(Canada)	Jake Harris	Junior	F	5' 9" (1.75 m)	177 lb (80 kg)	1998-04-10	Toronto, Ontario	Nanaimo Clippers (BCHL)	—
19	(Finland)	Samuli Niinisaari	Sophomore	D	6' 1" (1.85 m)	187 lb (85 kg)	1998-08-11	Hamina, Finland	Lincoln Stars (USHL)	—
20	(Norway)	Joachim Weberg	Senior	F	5' 10" (1.78 m)	175 lb (79 kg)	1996-06-21	Oslo, Norway	Jersey Hitmen (USPHL)	—
21	(United States)	Alec Mehr	Senior	F	6' 0" (1.83 m)	195 lb (88 kg)	1997-01-11	Los Angeles, California	Bloomington Thunder (USHL)	—
22	(United States)	Matty Holmes	Sophomore	F	6' 2" (1.88 m)	200 lb (91 kg)	1999-02-22	Rye, New York	Chilliwack Chiefs (BCHL)	—
23	(Canada)	Jackson Munro	Freshman	D	5' 11" (1.8 m)	180 lb (82 kg)	2000-02-11	Vancouver, British Columbia	Alberni Valley Bulldogs (BCHL)	—
24	(Canada)	Dorian Dawson	Junior	D	6' 2" (1.88 m)	205 lb (93 kg)	1997-05-29	Collingwood, Ontario	Sioux City Musketeers (USHL)	—
25	(United States)	Michael Maloney	Junior	F	5' 10" (1.78 m)	185 lb (84 kg)	1998-02-17	McHenry, Illinois	Omaha Lancers (USHL)	—
26	(United States)	James Crossman	Sophomore	D	6' 3" (1.91 m)	200 lb (91 kg)	1998-11-23	Denver, Colorado	Jamestown Rebels (NAHL)	—
27	(United States)	Jordan Tonelli	Freshman	F	6' 0" (1.83 m)	180 lb (82 kg)	2000-06-30	Armonk, New York	Cedar Rapids RoughRiders (USHL)	—
28	(Canada)	Colin Burston	Senior	F	5' 10" (1.78 m)	185 lb (84 kg)	1997-03-28	Winnipeg, Manitoba	Wenatchee Wild (BCHL)	—
29	(United States)	Cole Quisenberry	Sophomore	F	5' 11" (1.8 m)	180 lb (82 kg)	1999-03-22	Denver, Colorado	Chicago Steel (USHL)	—
33	(United States)	Gabriel Vinal	Junior	G	6' 2" (1.88 m)	185 lb (84 kg)	1999-01-12	Syracuse, New York	Aberdeen Wings (NAHL)	—
35	(United States)	Luke Kania (A)	Senior	G	6' 2" (1.88 m)	190 lb (86 kg)	1996-01-24	Chicago, Illinois	Minnesota Wilderness (NAHL)	—

== Standings ==
2020–21 ECAC Hockey Standings
	Conference record											Overall record					
	GP	W	L	T	OTW	OTL	3/SW	PTS	PT%	GF	GA	GP	W	L	T	GF	GA
#11 Quinnipiac †	18	10	4	4	1	1	3	37	.685	54	34	29	17	8	4	100	59
#20 Clarkson	14	6	4	4	1	2	2	25	.595	29	25	22	11	7	4	62	52
St. Lawrence *	14	4	8	2	1	1	1	15	.357	30	37	17	6	8	3	40	45
Colgate	18	5	9	4	1	0	1	16	.352	34	51	22	6	11	5	48	66
Brown	0	-	-	-	-	-	-	-	-	-	-	0	-	-	-	-	-
Cornell	0	-	-	-	-	-	-	-	-	-	-	0	-	-	-	-	-
Dartmouth	0	-	-	-	-	-	-	-	-	-	-	0	-	-	-	-	-
Harvard	0	-	-	-	-	-	-	-	-	-	-	0	-	-	-	-	-
Princeton	0	-	-	-	-	-	-	-	-	-	-	0	-	-	-	-	-
Rensselaer	0	-	-	-	-	-	-	-	-	-	-	0	-	-	-	-	-
Union	0	-	-	-	-	-	-	-	-	-	-	0	-	-	-	-	-
Yale	0	-	-	-	-	-	-	-	-	-	-	0	-	-	-	-	-
Championship: March 20, 2021 † indicates conference regular season champion (Cleary Cup) * indicates conference tournament champion (Whitelaw Cup); Rankings: USCHO.com Top 20 Poll

== Schedule and results ==
Season Cancelled
