= 2020–21 Colgate Raiders men's ice hockey season =

- Conference: 4th ECAC Hockey
- Home ice: Class of 1965 Arena

Rankings
- USCHO: NR
- USA Today: NR

Record
- Overall: 6–11–5
- Conference: 5–9–4–1–0–1
- Home: 1–7–3
- Road: 5–4–2
- Neutral: 0–0–0

Coaches and captains
- Head coach: Don Vaughan
- Assistant coaches: Dana Borges; Andy Boschetto
- Captain: Paul McAvoy
- Alternate captain(s): Trevor Cosgrove; Tyler Jeanson; Josh McKechney

The 2020–21 Colgate Raiders Men's ice hockey season was the 91st season of play for the program and the 60th season in the ECAC Hockey conference. The Raiders represented the Colgate University and played their home games at Class of 1965 Arena, and were coached by Don Vaughan, in his 28th season as their head coach.

== Season ==
As a result of the ongoing COVID-19 pandemic the entire college ice hockey season was delayed. Because the NCAA had previously announced that all winter sports athletes would retain whatever eligibility they possessed through at least the following year, none of Colgate's players would lose a season of play. However, the NCAA also approved a change in its transfer regulations that would allow players to transfer and play immediately rather than having to sit out a season, as the rules previously required.

The start to Colgate's season was a bit rough as the team won 1 of their first six games. They recovered afterwards and nearly reached a .500 record by early February but the team flagged afterwards and ended the season last in the conference. The Raiders met St. Lawrence in the ECAC Tournament and outplayed the Saints but still managed to lose 4–5 in overtime. The poor finish should be taken with a grain of salt, however, as eight of the twelve ECAC teams had cancelled their seasons. This resulted in Colgate playing 21 out of 22 games against Clarkson, Quinnipiac and St. Lawrence, two of which were ranked throughout the season. The only real takeaway from the season for Colgate was that the team has some work to do if they want to compete against Clarkson and Quinnipiac.

Mitchel Benson, William Friend, and Henry Marshall sat out the season.

== Departures ==
Player	Position	Nationality	Cause
Jared Cockrell	Forward	United States	Graduate transfer to St. Cloud State
Ross Craig	Defenseman	Canada	Graduation
Bobby McMann	Forward	Canada	Graduation (Signed with Wichita Thunder)
Paul Meyer	Defenseman	United States	Graduation (Signed with Orlando Solar Bears)
Jacob Panetta	Defenseman	Canada	Graduation (Signed with Jacksonville Icemen)
Tyler Penner	Forward	Canada	Graduation (Signed with Birmingham Bulls)
Nick Quillan	Defenseman	Canada	Left program
Ben Sharf	Forward	United States	Graduation
John Snodgrass	Forward	United States	Graduation

== Recruiting ==
Player	Position	Nationality	Age	Notes
Nick Anderson	Defenseman	United States	21	Wayzata, MN
Pierson Brandon	Defenseman	United States	20	Irvington, NY
P. J. Garrett	Defenseman	United States	20	Duxbury, MA
Levi Glasman	Forward	Canada	21	Lacombe, AB
Carter Gylander	Goaltender	United States	19	Beaumont, AB; Selected 191st overall in 2019
Elliott McDermott	Defenseman	Canada	20	Kingston, ON
Ross Mitton	Forward	United States	20	Copiague, NY
Alex Young	Forward	Canada	19	Calgary, AB; Selected 196th overall in 2020

== Roster ==
As of December 17, 2020.

No.	Nat.	Player	Class	Pos	Height	Weight	DoB	Hometown	Previous team	NHL rights
1	(Canada)	Mitch Benson	Junior	G	6' 1" (1.85 m)	185 lb (84 kg)	1997-11-18	Windsor, Ontario	Brooks Bandits (AJHL)	—
2	(United States)	Pierson Brandon	Freshman	D	6' 0" (1.83 m)	175 lb (79 kg)	2000-06-26	Irvington, New York	Aberdeen Wings (NAHL)	—
3	(United States)	Anthony Stark	Sophomore	D	5' 9" (1.75 m)	170 lb (77 kg)	1999-04-09	New York, New York	Madison Capitols (USHL)	—
4	(Canada)	Elliott McDermott	Freshman	D	5' 11" (1.8 m)	196 lb (89 kg)	1999-02-03	Kingston, Ontario	Carleton Place Canadians (CCHL)	—
5	(United States)	Paul McAvoy (C)	Senior	F	6' 2" (1.88 m)	200 lb (91 kg)	1996-09-17	Richmond, Kentucky	Surrey Eagles (BCHL)	—
7	(Canada)	Josh McKechney (A)	Senior	F	6' 1" (1.85 m)	195 lb (88 kg)	1997-05-29	Calgary, Alberta	Brooks Bandits (AJHL)	—
8	(United States)	P. J. Garrett	Freshman	D	6' 4" (1.93 m)	210 lb (95 kg)	2000-01-17	Duxbury, Massachusetts	Powell River Kings (BCHL)	—
10	(Canada)	Arnaud Vachon	Sophomore	F	6' 2" (1.88 m)	210 lb (95 kg)	1998-05-13	Ajax, Ontario	Brooks Bandits (AJHL)	—
11	(United States)	Nick Austin	Senior	D	5' 11" (1.8 m)	185 lb (84 kg)	1997-11-17	St. Louis Park, Minnesota	Madison Capitols (USHL)	—
12	(Canada)	Colton Young	Sophomore	F	6' 0" (1.83 m)	175 lb (79 kg)	1998-08-23	Calgary, Alberta	Canmore Eagles (AJHL)	—
13	(Switzerland)	Matt Verboon	Sophomore	F	6' 1" (1.85 m)	195 lb (88 kg)	2000-02-23	Geneva, Switzerland	Salmon Arm Silverbacks (BCHL)	—
14	(Canada)	Ethan Manderville	Sophomore	F	6' 4" (1.93 m)	200 lb (91 kg)	2000-07-01	Ottawa, Ontario	Ottawa Jr. Senators (CCHL)	—
15	(United States)	Jack Hoey	Sophomore	F	6' 1" (1.85 m)	195 lb (88 kg)	1998-11-03	Fairfield, Connecticut	Choate Rosemary Hall (USHS–CT)	—
16		Griffin Lunn	Junior	F	5' 10" (1.78 m)	190 lb (86 kg)	1997-11-15	Lockport, New York	Sioux Falls Stampede (USHL)	—
17		Ross Mitton	Freshman	F	5' 10" (1.78 m)	185 lb (84 kg)	2000-07-05	Copiague Harbor, New York	Omaha Lancers (USHL)	—
19	(United States)	Henry Marshall	Senior	F	6' 1" (1.85 m)	180 lb (82 kg)	1997-01-09	New Canaan, Connecticut	Alberni Valley Bulldogs (BCHL)	—
20	(Canada)	Levi Glasman	Freshman	F	6' 2" (1.88 m)	172 lb (78 kg)	1999-07-31	Lacombe, Alberta	Powell River Kings (BCHL)	—
21	(Canada)	Alex Young	Freshman	F	5' 11" (1.8 m)	180 lb (82 kg)	2001-03-22	Calgary, Alberta	Canmore Eagles (AJHL)	SJS, 196th overall 2020
22	(Canada)	Tyler Jeanson (A)	Senior	F	5' 8" (1.73 m)	175 lb (79 kg)	1997-09-16	Carman, Manitoba	Minot Minotauros (NAHL)	—
23	(Canada)	Jeff Stewart	Junior	F	6' 3" (1.91 m)	190 lb (86 kg)	1998-02-23	Surrey, British Columbia	Surrey Eagles (BCHL)	—
24	(United States)	Trevor Cosgrove (A)	Senior	D	6' 0" (1.83 m)	194 lb (88 kg)	1997-06-04	Exeter, New Hampshire	Alberni Valley Bulldogs (BCHL)	—
25	(Canada)	Evan Tschumi	Senior	F	6' 2" (1.88 m)	205 lb (93 kg)	1997-04-25	Calgary, Alberta	Whitecourt Wolverines (AJHL)	—
26	(Canada)	Liam Watson-Brawn	Sophomore	D	6' 0" (1.83 m)	190 lb (86 kg)	1999-04-06	Vancouver, British Columbia	Prince George Spruce Kings (BCHL)	—
27	(United States)	Nick Anderson	Freshman	D	5' 10" (1.78 m)	165 lb (75 kg)	1999-01-04	Independence, Minnesota	Sioux Falls Stampede (USHL)	—
31	(Canada)	Andrew Farrier	Sophomore	G	6' 2" (1.88 m)	195 lb (88 kg)	1997-10-01	Montreal, Quebec	Kingston Voyageurs (OJHL)	—
32	(United States)	Will Friend	Sophomore	G	6' 2" (1.88 m)	165 lb (75 kg)	1999-08-02	South Hamilton, Massachusetts	The Governor's Academy (USHS–MA)	—
37	(Canada)	Carter Gylander	Freshman	G	6' 5" (1.96 m)	185 lb (84 kg)	2001-06-05	Beaumont, Alberta	Sherwood Park Crusaders (AJHL)	DET, 191st overall 2019

== Standings ==
2020–21 ECAC Hockey Standings
	Conference record											Overall record					
	GP	W	L	T	OTW	OTL	3/SW	PTS	PT%	GF	GA	GP	W	L	T	GF	GA
#11 Quinnipiac †	18	10	4	4	1	1	3	37	.685	54	34	29	17	8	4	100	59
#20 Clarkson	14	6	4	4	1	2	2	25	.595	29	25	22	11	7	4	62	52
St. Lawrence *	14	4	8	2	1	1	1	15	.357	30	37	17	6	8	3	40	45
Colgate	18	5	9	4	1	0	1	16	.352	34	51	22	6	11	5	48	66
Brown	0	-	-	-	-	-	-	-	-	-	-	0	-	-	-	-	-
Cornell	0	-	-	-	-	-	-	-	-	-	-	0	-	-	-	-	-
Dartmouth	0	-	-	-	-	-	-	-	-	-	-	0	-	-	-	-	-
Harvard	0	-	-	-	-	-	-	-	-	-	-	0	-	-	-	-	-
Princeton	0	-	-	-	-	-	-	-	-	-	-	0	-	-	-	-	-
Rensselaer	0	-	-	-	-	-	-	-	-	-	-	0	-	-	-	-	-
Union	0	-	-	-	-	-	-	-	-	-	-	0	-	-	-	-	-
Yale	0	-	-	-	-	-	-	-	-	-	-	0	-	-	-	-	-
Championship: March 20, 2021 † indicates conference regular season champion (Cleary Cup) * indicates conference tournament champion (Whitelaw Cup); Rankings: USCHO.com Top 20 Poll

== Schedule and results ==
Date	Time	Opponent^{#}	Rank^{#}	Site	TV	Decision	Result	Attendance	Record
Regular season
November 22	4:00 PM	vs. #8 Clarkson*		Class of 1965 Arena • Hamilton, New York		Gylander	L 1–2	0	0–1–0
December 23	4:00 PM	at #8 Clarkson*		Cheel Arena • Potsdam, New York		Gylander	W 5–4 ^{OT}	0	1–1–0
December 29	4:00 PM	vs. RIT*		Class of 1965 Arena • Hamilton, New York		Gylander	T 4–4 ^{OT}	0	1–1–1
January 1	6:45 PM	vs. #10 Clarkson*		Class of 1965 Arena • Hamilton, New York		Gylander	L 1–4	0	1–2–1 (0–1–0)
January 3	4:00 PM	at #10 Clarkson*		Cheel Arena • Potsdam, New York		Farrier	T 1–1 ^{SOW}	0	1–2–2 (0–1–1)
January 7	5:00 PM	vs. St. Lawrence*		Class of 1965 Arena • Hamilton, New York		Farrier	L 1–2	0	1–3–2 (0–2–1)
January 9	7:00 PM	at St. Lawrence*		Appleton Arena • Canton, New York		Gylander	W 4–2	0	2–3–2 (1–2–1)
January 10	5:00 PM	at St. Lawrence*		Appleton Arena • Canton, New York		Gylander	T 1–1 ^{SOW}	0	2–3–3 (1–2–2)
January 15	5:00 PM	vs. #11 Quinnipiac*		Class of 1965 Arena • Hamilton, New York		Gylander	L 0–3	0	2–4–3 (1–3–2)
January 17	4:00 PM	at #11 Quinnipiac*		People's United Center • Hamden, Connecticut		Gylander	L 0–3	0	2–5–3 (1–4–2)
January 21	5:00 PM	at St. Lawrence*		Appleton Arena • Canton, New York		Gylander	W 4–3 ^{OT}	0	3–5–3 (2–4–2)
January 23	6:00 PM	vs. St. Lawrence*		Class of 1965 Arena • Hamilton, New York		Farrier	L 3–4	0	3–6–3 (2–5–2)
January 24	4:00 PM	vs. St. Lawrence*		Class of 1965 Arena • Hamilton, New York		Gylander	W 4–3	0	4–6–3 (3–5–2)
February 4	5:00 PM	at #13 Clarkson*		Cheel Arena • Potsdam, New York		Gylander	W 2–0	0	5–6–3 (4–5–2)
February 6	4:00 PM	at #13 Clarkson*		Cheel Arena • Potsdam, New York		Gylander	T 1–1 ^{SOL}	0	5–6–4 (4–5–3)
February 12	5:00 PM	vs. #11 Quinnipiac*		Class of 1965 Arena • Hamilton, New York		Gylander	T 2–2 ^{SOL}	0	5–6–5 (4–5–4)
February 13	4:00 PM	vs. #11 Quinnipiac*		Class of 1965 Arena • Hamilton, New York		Gylander	L 0–9	0	5–7–5 (4–6–4)
February 26	5:00 PM	at #15 Clarkson*		Cheel Arena • Potsdam, New York		Gylander	L 2–3	0	5–8–5 (4–7–4)
February 27	4:00 PM	at #15 Clarkson*		Cheel Arena • Potsdam, New York		Gylander	L 2–3	0	5–9–5 (4–8–4)
March 5	6:00 PM	at #11 Quinnipiac*		People's United Center • Hamden, Connecticut		Gylander	L 2–4	0	5–10–5 (4–9–4)
March 6	4:00 PM	at #11 Quinnipiac*		People's United Center • Hamden, Connecticut		Gylander	W 4–3	0	6–10–5 (5–9–4)
ECAC Hockey Tournament
March 18	5:00 PM	at St. Lawrence*		Appleton Arena • Canton, New York (ECAC Quarterfinal)		Gylander	L 4–5 ^{OT}	0	6–11–5
*Non-conference game. ^{#}Rankings from USCHO.com Poll. All times are in Eastern Time.

== Scoring statistics ==
Name	Position	Games	Goals	Assists	Points	PIM
Josh McKechney	F	22	7	6	13	12
Alex Young	C	21	6	7	13	17
Matt Verboon	C/RW	22	4	6	10	14
Griffin Lunn	F	22	3	7	10	14
Pierson Brandon	D	22	0	10	10	16
Jeff Stewart	LW	22	3	5	8	6
Arnaud Vachon	C	22	3	5	8	10
Nick Anderson	D	21	2	6	8	10
Ethan Manderville	C	22	4	2	6	10
Evan Tschumi	C/W	20	2	4	6	6
Elliott McDermott	D	22	2	4	6	10
Nick Austin	F/D	18	1	5	6	8
Paul McAvoy	F	22	3	2	5	2
Tyler Jeanson	C	17	2	3	5	4
Trevor Cosgrove	D	22	3	1	4	10
Levi Glasman	LW	20	1	3	4	8
Colton Young	F	21	1	3	4	38
Ross Mitton	F	21	1	2	3	4
Anthony Stark	D	22	0	1	1	6
Liam Watson-Brawn	D	1	0	0	0	0
Jack Hoey	C	5	0	0	0	0
Andrew Farrier	G	8	0	0	0	0
P. J. Garrett	D	10	0	0	0	6
Carter Gylander	G	19	0	0	0	0
Bench	-	-	-	-	-	8
Total			48	82	130	219

== Goaltending statistics ==
Name	Games	Minutes	Wins	Losses	Ties	Goals against	Saves	Shut outs	SV %	GAA
Carter Gylander	19	1048	6	9	4	47	428	1	.901	2.69
Andrew Farrier	8	296	0	2	1	18	113	0	.863	3.64
Empty Net	-	13	-	-	-	1	-	-	-	-
Total	22	1358	6	11	5	66	541	1	.891	2.91

== Rankings ==
Poll	Week																					
Poll	Pre	1	2	3	4	5	6	7	8	9	10	11	12	13	14	15	16	17	18	19	20	21 (Final)
USCHO.com	NR	NR	NR	NR	NR	NR	NR	NR	NR	NR	NR	NR	NR	NR	NR	NR	NR	NR	NR	NR	-	NR
USA Today	NR	NR	NR	NR	NR	NR	NR	NR	NR	NR	NR	NR	NR	NR	NR	NR	NR	NR	NR	NR	NR	NR

USCHO did not release a poll in week 20.

== Awards and honors ==
Player	Award	Ref
Pierson Brandon	ECAC Hockey Best Defensive Defenseman	
Josh McKechney	ECAC Hockey First Team	
Pierson Brandon	ECAC Hockey Rookie Team	
Alex Young	ECAC Hockey Rookie Team	
