= Philip Kemp =

American ice hockey player (born 1999)

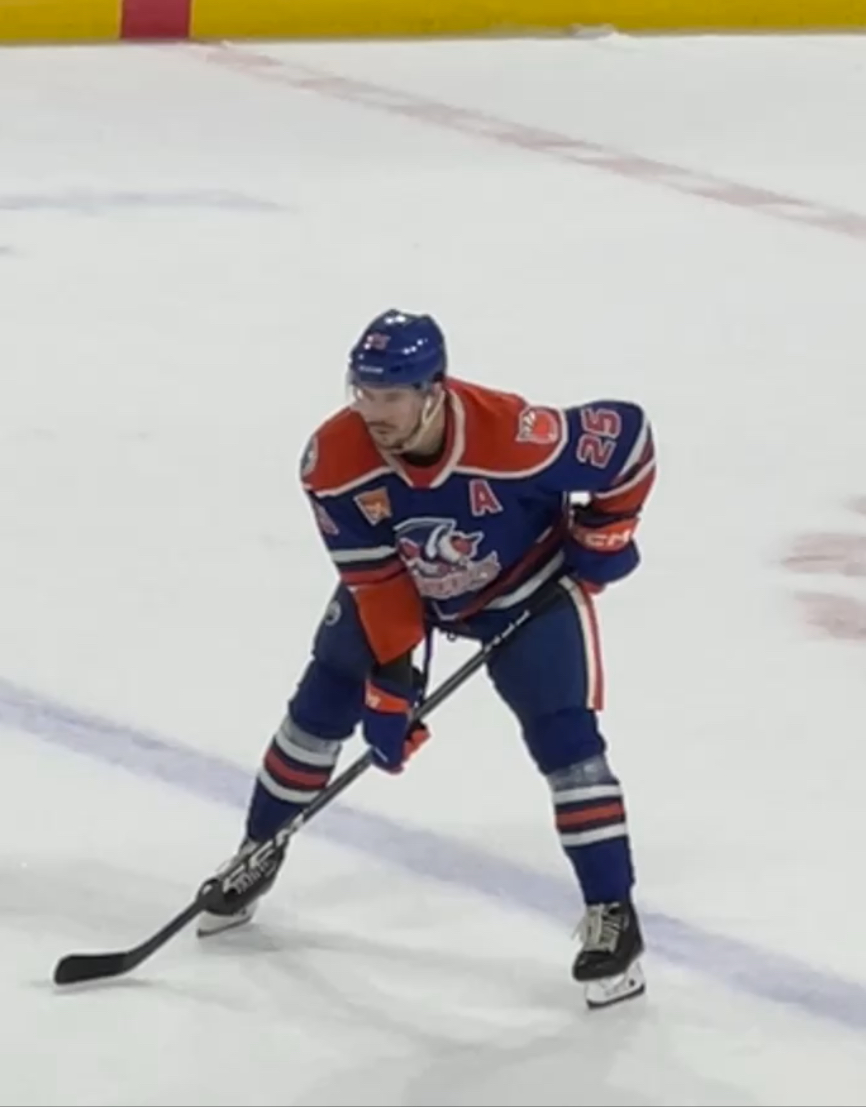
- Kemp in 2024
- Born: February 12, 1999 (age 27) Greenwich, Connecticut, U.S.
- Height: 6 ft 3 in (191 cm)
- Weight: 202 lb (92 kg; 14 st 6 lb)
- Position: Defense
- Shoots: Right
- NHL team (P) Cur. team Former teams: Pittsburgh Penguins; WBS Penguins (AHL); Edmonton Oilers
- NHL draft: 208th overall, 2017; Edmonton Oilers
- Playing career: 2020–present

Philip Kemp (born February 12, 1999) is an American professional ice hockey player for the Wilkes-Barre/Scranton Penguins in the American Hockey League (AHL) while under contract to the Pittsburgh Penguins of the National Hockey League (NHL). He attended the Yale University where he played college hockey and served as its captain in the 2019–20 season. Kemp was drafted by the Edmonton Oilers in the seventh round of the 2017 NHL entry draft, 208th overall.

== Playing career ==
On November 25, 2020, Kemp signed a three-year entry-level contract with the Oilers and was assigned to Väsby IK of the HockeyAllsvenskan. On March 27, 2021, following the conclusion of Väsby's season, Kemp and fellow Oilers prospect, Raphaël Lavoie, were both assigned to the Bakersfield Condors of the American Hockey League (AHL).

After playing in the AHL for the Condors for three seasons, he was re-signed by the team in May 2023 to a two-year, two-way contract. He played his first NHL game on January 13, 2024, against the Montreal Canadiens.

As a free agent from the Oilers following five seasons within the organization, Kemp was signed to a two-year, two-way contract with the Pittsburgh Penguins on July 2, 2025.

== Career statistics ==
=== Regular season and playoffs ===
			Regular season					Playoffs
Season	Team	League	GP	G	A	Pts	PIM	GP	G	A	Pts	PIM
2015–16	U.S. National Development Team	USHL	35	1	3	4	2	—	—	—	—	—
2016–17	U.S. National Development Team	USHL	25	2	2	4	8	—	—	—	—	—
2017–18	Yale University	ECAC	26	3	5	8	8	—	—	—	—	—
2018–19	Yale University	ECAC	30	3	5	8	35	—	—	—	—	—
2019–20	Yale University	ECAC	32	3	8	11	10	—	—	—	—	—
2020–21	Väsby IK	Allsv	32	3	7	10	10	—	—	—	—	—
2020–21	Bakersfield Condors	AHL	12	0	1	1	4	2	1	0	1	2
2021–22	Bakersfield Condors	AHL	55	3	6	9	21	—	—	—	—	—
2022–23	Bakersfield Condors	AHL	71	6	15	21	51	2	0	0	0	0
2023–24	Bakersfield Condors	AHL	64	2	13	15	54	2	0	0	0	0
2023–24	Edmonton Oilers	NHL	1	0	0	0	0	—	—	—	—	—
2024–25	Bakersfield Condors	AHL	56	7	5	12	39	—	—	—	—	—
2025–26	Wilkes-Barre/Scranton Penguins	AHL	70	3	7	10	56	13	1	0	1	4
NHL totals			1	0	0	0	0	—	—	—	—	—

Medal record

Representing United States

Ice hockey

World Junior Championships
Silver medal – second place	2019 Canada	

World U18 Championships
Gold medal – first place	2017 Slovakia	

=== International ===
Year	Team	Event	Result	GP	G	A	Pts	PIM
2015	United States	U17	6th	5	0	2	2	2
2017	United States	U18	1st place, gold medalist(s)	7	0	2	2	2
2019	United States	WJC	2nd place, silver medalist(s)	7	0	1	1	0
Junior totals				19	0	5	5	4
