= Brent Brekke =

American ice hockey coach (born 1971)

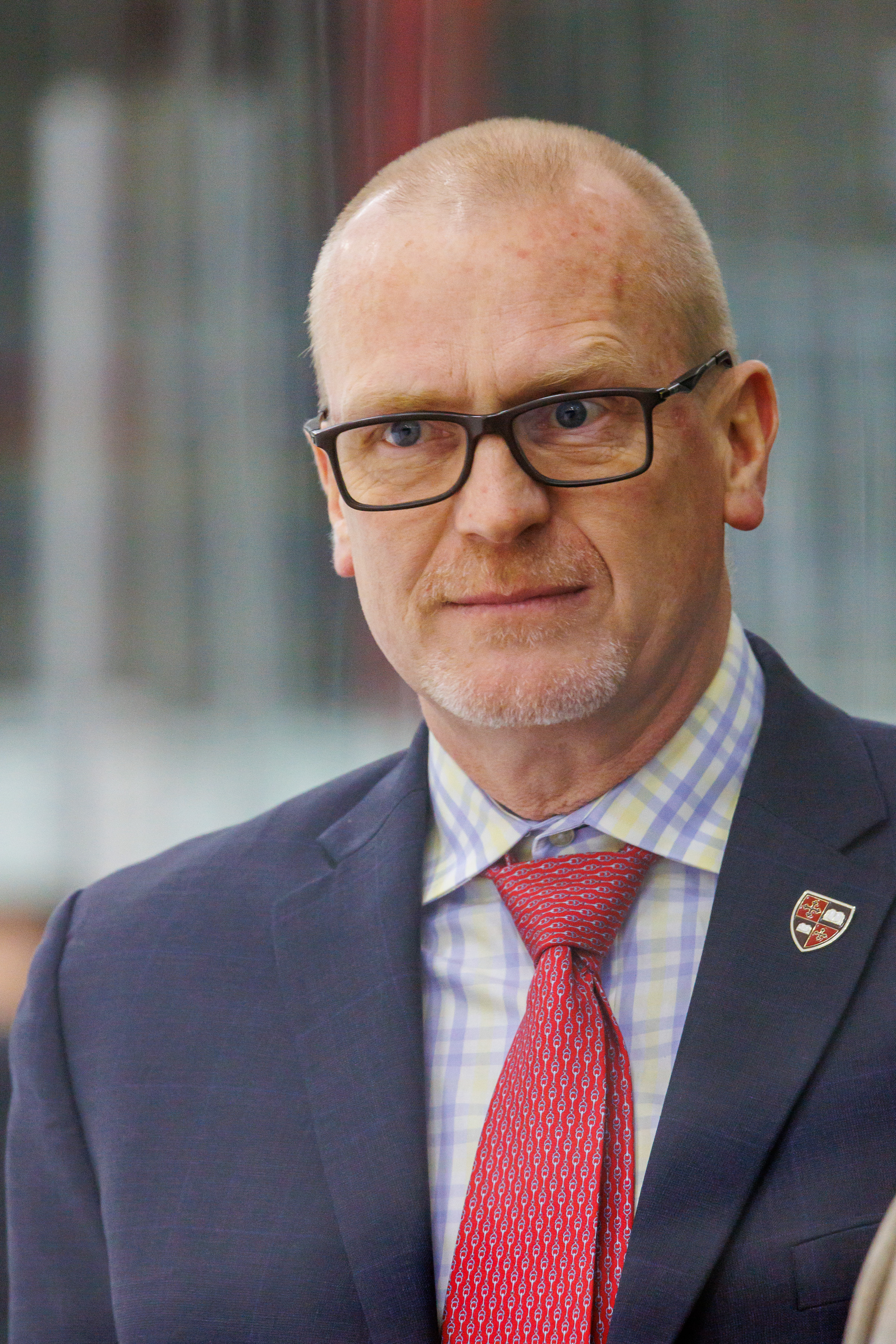

Current position
- Title: Head coach
- Team: St. Lawrence
- Conference: ECAC Hockey
- Record: 61–115–23 (.364)

Biographical details
- Born: October 16, 1971 (age 55); Minot, North Dakota, U.S.
- Education: Western Michigan

Playing career
- 1989–1990: Rochester Mustangs
- 1990–1994: Western Michigan
- 1994–1996: Cornwall Aces
- 1994–1996: Dayton Bombers
- Position: Defenseman

Coaching career (HC unless noted)
- 1997–1999: Chicago Freeze (assistant)
- 1999–2008: Cornell (assistant)
- 2008–2018: Miami (associate)
- 2018–2019: Clarkson (assistant)
- 2019–present: St. Lawrence

Head coaching record
- Overall: 61–116–23 (.363)

Accomplishments and honors

Championships
- 2021 ECAC Tournament Champion

Awards
- Terry Flanagan Award (2015)

Brent Brekke (born August 16, 1971) is an American former ice hockey player who currently the head coach at St. Lawrence.

== Career ==
=== Playing ===
Brekke played his college hockey at Western Michigan for Bill Wilkinson. He played for years for the Broncos, serving as an alternate captain in his junior season. After being named team captain for his senior season, Brekke helped Western Michigan to a 24-win season, the third-highest win total in program history (as of 2019), and reach the NCAA Tournament for only the second time. After graduating with a degree in marketing Brekke embarked on a two-year professional career, splitting time between the AHL and ECHL affiliates of the Quebec Nordiques/Colorado Avalanche, the team that had drafted him in 1991.

=== Coaching ===
After a year off from hockey, Brekke signed on as the Director of Player Personnel and assistant coach for the Chicago Freeze, a junior team in the NAHL. After two years with the Freeze Brekke returned to the college ranks as an assistant at Cornell for Mike Schafer. In nine years Brekke helped the Big Red reach the NCAA Tournament 4 times, including the Frozen Four in 2003, and helped build one of the toughest defensive corps in college hockey history. Brekke was lured away from Ithaca in 2008 by Miami and the RedHawks promptly reach the Championship Game, falling in overtime to Boston University. After two years he was promoted to associate head coach and continued to serve in that capacity for another 8 seasons.

In 2018, with the team stuck in the mire, Brekke and fellow assistant Nick Petraglia both agreed to part ways with the program. Brekke didn't remain jobless for long, accepting an offer from Clarkson to be an assistant under Casey Jones. In his only season with the Golden Knights Brekke helped Clarkson win its first conference tournament in over a decade.

Less than two months after St. Lawrence fired Mark Morris the Saints named Brekke the 15th head coach in program history.

== Head coaching record ==
Record table
Season	Team	Overall	Conference	Standing	Postseason
St. Lawrence Saints (ECAC Hockey) (2019–present)
2019–20	St. Lawrence	4–27–5	2–18–2	12th	ECAC First Round
2020–21	St. Lawrence	6–8–3	4–8–2	3rd	ECAC Champion*
2021–22	St. Lawrence	11–19–7	7–10–5	8th	ECAC Quarterfinals
2022–23	St. Lawrence	17–19–0	12–10–0	4th	ECAC Quarterfinals
2023–24	St. Lawrence	14–19–6	8–10–4	7th	ECAC Runner-Up
2024–25	St. Lawrence	9–24–2	5–15–2	12th	ECAC First Round
St. Lawrence:		61–116–23 (.363)	38–71–15 (.367)		
Total:		61–116–23 (.363)			
National champion Postseason invitational champion Conference regular season champion Conference regular season and conference tournament champion Division regular season champion Division regular season and conference tournament champion Conference tournament champion

* St. Lawrence was forced to withdraw from the NCAA Tournament due to Brekke testing positive for COVID-19.

Awards and achievements
Preceded by Bob Marshall	CCHA Best Defensive Defenseman; 1993–94	Succeeded by Steve Halko
