= Three Dialogues Between Hylas and Philonous =

1713 work by George Berkeley

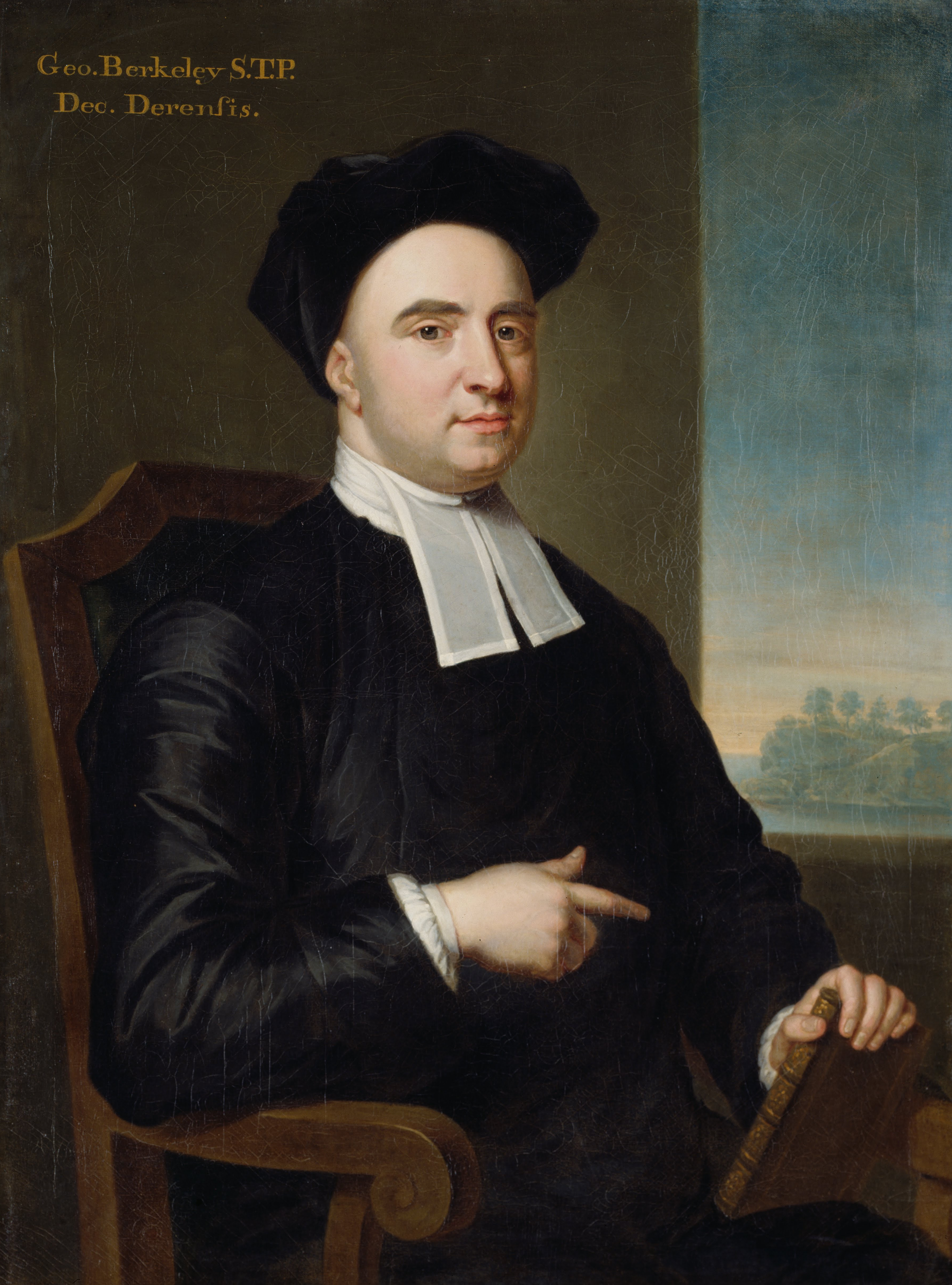
George Berkeley, who wrote the book

Three Dialogues between Hylas and Philonous, or simply Three Dialogues, is a 1713 book on metaphysics and idealism written by George Berkeley. Taking the form of a dialogue, the book was written as a response to the criticism Berkeley experienced after publishing A Treatise Concerning the Principles of Human Knowledge.

Three important concepts discussed in the Three Dialogues are perceptual relativity, the conceivability/master argument (Note: The term "master argument" was coined by André Gallois) and Berkeley's phenomenalism. Perceptual relativity argues that the same object can appear to have different characteristics (e.g. shape) depending on the observer's perspective. Since objective features of objects cannot change without an inherent change in the object itself, shape must not be an objective feature.

== Background ==
In 1709, Berkeley published his first major work, An Essay Towards a New Theory of Vision, in which he discussed the limitations of human vision and advanced the theory that the proper objects of sight are not material objects, but light and colour. This foreshadowed his chief philosophical work, A Treatise Concerning the Principles of Human Knowledge (1710), which, after its poor reception, he rewrote into the Three Dialogues (1713).

== Hylas and Philonous ==
Philonous (Greek: "lover of Nous, or roughly, mind") represents the views of Berkeley, while Hylas ("hyle", Greek: "matter") represents the views of his opponents, in particular John Locke.

In The First Dialogue, Hylas expresses his disdain for skepticism, adding that he has heard Philonous to have "maintained the most extravagant opinion that ever entered into the mind of man, to wit, that there is no such thing as material substance in the world." Philonous argues that it is actually Hylas who is the skeptic and that he can prove it. Thus, a philosophical battle of wit begins.

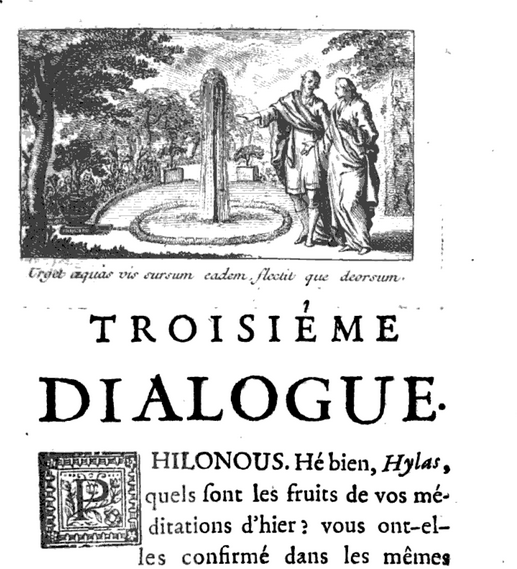
Page from the Third Dialogue in a 1750 French edition.

Philonous questions Hylas systematically regarding what humans know of the world, first examining secondary qualities, such as heat, to show that such qualities do not exist outside the individual mind. He then moves on to primary qualities such as extension and shape, and likewise argues that they, too, are dependent entirely on one's perception and perspective (e.g., From a distance, a great mountain appears to be small, and the shape of a thing may change dramatically under a microscope: "You may at any time make the experiment, by looking with one eye bare, and with the other through a microscope").

Hylas's view of matter (which has its origin in the Platonic theory of forms , or abstract entities that exist outside of the sensible world) is systematically destroyed by Philonous (Berkeley). The basic argument is that because matter is only known to us by its sensible qualities, it is impossible to describe or even imagine matter without these qualities. For in the absence of sensible qualities, matter, by definition, loses its essential qualities.

Berkeley's argument goes further: sensible qualities are not inherent in matter. Rather, they are ascribed and understood by the mind. Color, sound, temperature and even shape are qualities entirely dependent on a mind. Indeed, without a "mind," it becomes impossible to imagine "matter." The answer to the question, "If a tree falls in the forest and no mind is present, does it make a noise?" is answered by Berkeley's immaterialism: There is no tree, other than either the sense-data or the bundle of perceptions of which it is made up. However, God is always perceiving everything. In other words, there is always a mind present. A human (and thus a human mind) need not be present for the tree to make a sound, for the mind of God is always present, or so Berkeley argues. It is this mind of God that gives sensible qualities to matter, not matter itself.

In his own time Berkeley faced opposition from many philosophers who shared the Platonic view. These philosophers thought Berkeley to be vulgar, because his own view seemed to confirm the views held by the lower classes. Roughly speaking, the "common view" was that God created everything and that the things on Earth were the real things. Some philosophers did not believe in God, and believed matter on Earth was but an imitation of actual matter that existed in another dimension. Berkeley sided with the common view.

The philosophy presented is often misinterpreted. The criticism is that Berkeley claims that we live in an illusory world, when in fact, Berkeley advocates for the acceptance of ideas as real "things." When we refer to an object, we don't refer to a material form, but to the idea of the object that informs our senses. Berkeley doesn't propose that nothing is real; he proposes that ideas themselves compose reality.
