= Ivan Sarailiev =

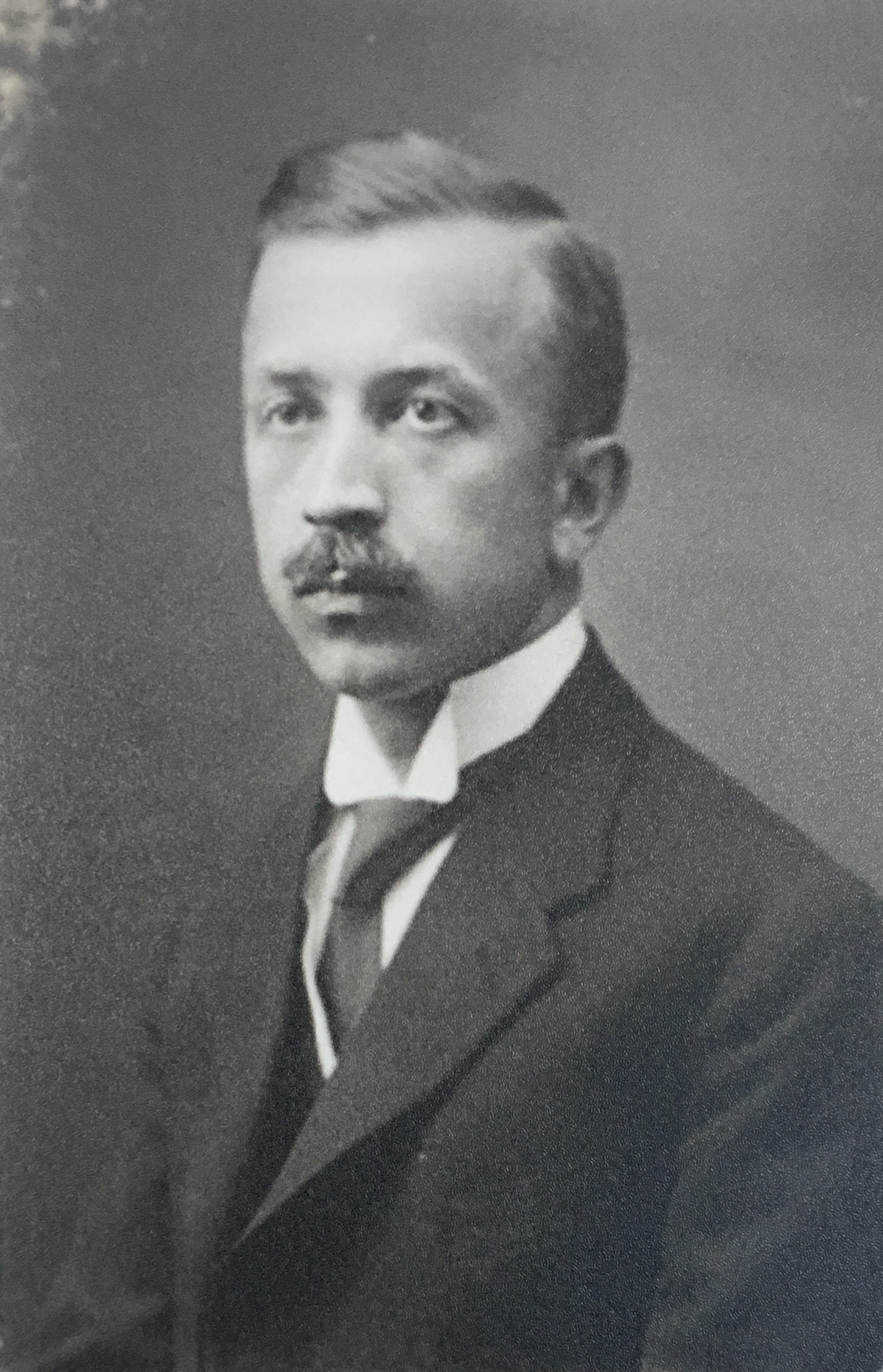
- Sarailev in 1918
- Born: June 1, 1887; Sofia, Bulgaria
- Died: May 23, 1969 (aged 81); Sofia, Bulgaria
- Occupations: philosopher, professor

Ivan Sarailiev (June 1, 1887, in Sofia – May 23, 1969, in Sofia) was a Bulgarian philosopher and philosophy professor, an early adept of pragmatism. He had obtained a stipend to pursue romance studies in Paris but started attending Bergson's lectures and turned to philosophy. Through his works he became acquainted with the philosophy of pragmatism, an interest which he cultivated during visits to Oxford and the USA (1931–33).

Sarailiev attended high-school in Sofia and won a scholarship at the Sorbonne, Paris, where he graduated in 1909. The following year he studied at Oxford and during the War he visited various German universities (1916-1918). Sarailiev started teaching Philosophy at the Sofia University "St. Kliment Ohridski" in 1919 and remained there for the next 30 years. In 1946 he became for a few months head of the university but was ousted due to political intrigue.

His lectures accorded much attention to Immanuel Kant, George Berkeley, Henri Bergson and Thomas Carlyle. In 1931-3 with a Rockfeller foundation grant he visited the most prestigious american universities. He read the volumes of Peirce's work as they appeared and in 1938 published his book Pragmatism. The new political regime after 1944 disapproved of his work and he was allowed to publish only a book on Socrates. Since 1989 there has been a renewed interest in his work and in 1999 his nachlass was turned into a public archive.

Among his books are: Rodovi idei (1919), Za volyata (1924) (Essay on Will) and Socrat (1947) (Socrates). He also translated Treatise Concerning the Principles of Human Knowledge by George Berkeley in 1914.

== Bibliography ==
- Ivan Mladenov, The First Steps of Peirce in Bulgaria, European Journal of Pragmatism and American Philosophy [online], VI-1 | 2014; DOI: https://doi.org/10.4000/ejpap.494
- Ivan Mladenov, Ivan Sarailiev - purviat bulgarski pragmatist?!, Demokraticheski pregled, 32, pp. 634–637.
- Ivan Mladenov. Ivan Sarailiev — An Early Bulgarian Contributor to Pragmatism. – In: Peirce Project Newsletter, 2000, Volume 3, № 2, Indiana University Purdue University Indianapolis, 2000.
- Kristian Bankov. Prof. Ivan V. Sarailiev, ezikat i semiotikata (Prof. Ivan V. Sarailiev, language and semiotics). – In: Ivan Sarailiev. Usilieto da usnavash. Sofia, 2004
- Yasen Zahariev. Filosofia i biografia (Philosophy and Biography). Sofia: New Bulgarian University, 2012, 176 с. (ISBN 978-954-535-713-8).
- Andrey Tashev. Pragmatizmat i Ivan Sarailiev. Kam korenite na semiotichnoto mislene v Balgaria (Pragmtism and Ivan Sarailiev. Towards the Roots of Semiotic Thought in Bulgaria). Sofia: Marin Drinov, Sofia University Press, 2013, 252 с. (ISBN 978-954-322-667-2; 978-954-07-3589-4).
