= Stonham =

Stonham may refer to:

Surname:

- Kay Stonham, British actress, writer and academic
- Ronnie Stonham (1927–2014), the Special Assistant to the Director of Personnel at the BBC until 1985, later caught up in the scandal over MI5 monitoring of potential staff

Places:

- Earl Stonham, small village and civil parish in the Mid Suffolk district of Suffolk, England
- Little Stonham, also known as Stonham Parva, is a village and civil parish in the Mid Suffolk district of Suffolk in eastern England
- Stonham Aspal, village and civil parish in the Mid Suffolk district of Suffolk in eastern England

Title:

- Victor Collins, Baron Stonham OBE PC (1903–1971), British Labour Party politician

== See also ==
- Stoneham (disambiguation)
