= Alberto Radicati =

Italian philosopher

Alberto Radicati, Count of Passerano (11 November 1698 in Turin – 24 October 1737 in The Hague), was an Italian historian, philosopher and free-thinker. He was the reputed author of the 1732 work A Philosophical Dissertation upon Death, Composed for the Consolation of the Unhappy by a Friend of Truth, published in London. This work created a scandal and led to the arrest of Radicati and his translator. The Dissertation upon Death is referenced by George Berkeley in his 1733 Theory of Vision Vindicated, section 5. There Radicati's work is used as an example of a free-thinker explicitly adopting the radical views attributed to the free-thinkers by Berkeley in his 1732 dialogue Alciphron, and so to defend Berkeley against the charge of attacking a strawman.
