= De Motu (Berkeley's essay) =

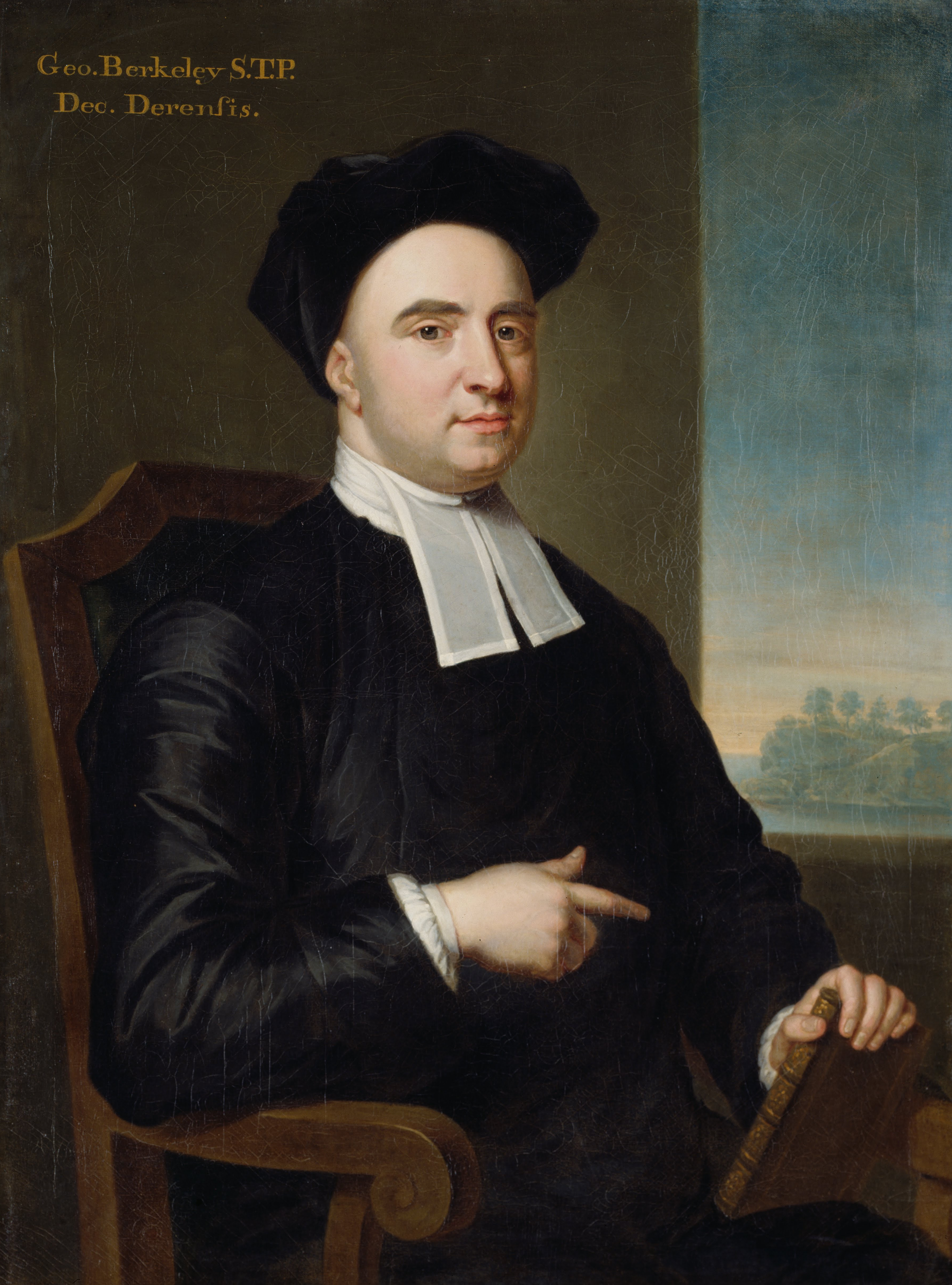
George Berkeley, who wrote the essay

De Motu: Sive, de Motus Principio & Natura, et de Causa Communicationis Motuum (On Motion: or The Principle and Nature of Motion and the Cause of the Communication of Motions), or simply De Motu, is an essay written by George Berkeley and published as a tract in London in 1721. The essay was unsuccessfully submitted for a prize that had been offered by the Royal Academy of Sciences at Paris. Berkeley rejected Sir Isaac Newton's absolute space, time and motion. With this essay, Berkeley is considered to be the "precursor of Mach and Einstein" (Karl Popper).

== Concrete and abstract motion ==
We must pay attention to facts regarding things and their nature, not to words or to someone's authority. The mind should be concerned with particular and concrete things themselves, not with abstract terms. The effects that are felt on our senses should be noticed. The causes of these effects are rationally inferred and are occult qualities.

Gravity and force are examples of occult qualities. But they can be useful terms. Gravity can designate concrete bodies in motion and force can designate the concrete effort of resisting. However, they should not be used abstractly, separate from concrete, individual things. If no change occurs and there is no effect, then there is no force. Force, gravity, and attraction are mathematical, hypothetical abstractions and they are not found in nature as physical qualities. The parallelogram of composite forces is not a physical quality. It is mathematical. Attempts to explain the cause and origin of motion are abstract and obscure. They are not particular and determinate assertions. Such attempts try to explain the unknown by something that is even more unknown.

== Principles or causes of motion ==
Bodies are not known to contain, within themselves, forces that cause motion. Minds, however, are known to cause motion. Such minds are particular, individual causes that are parts of the primary, universal cause of motion.

Bodies are passive, not active. They merely persist indifferently in their states, whether of impelled motion or of rest. Action and reaction are only mathematical hypotheses, not physical qualities. It is useful to refer to action and reaction when demonstrating mechanics, but they are not causes of motion.

We personally experience within ourselves a cause of our bodily motion. It is called soul, mind, or spirit. But we do not experience a cause of motions inside of other bodies. The ultimate cause of the motion of all bodies is the mind of God. This is known through metaphysics and theology.

Natural science is limited to experiments and mechanics, but it assumes that God was the prime source of motion. The laws of motion, not the cause of motion, are established by natural science. Physicists explain and understand phenomena by showing how they agree with the laws of motion. Fictional, abstract, general terms such as force, action, and reaction are used in theories, formulas, and computations. These cannot be found in bodies.

Through our senses, we actually experience only the effects of moving or resting bodies. The natural scientist is concerned with experiments, laws of motion, mechanical principles, and rational deduction from those principles. The principle and cause of motion itself is a metaphysical, theological, and moral concern.

== Nature of motion ==
Motion should not be considered as an abstraction, separated from space and time. It should not be analyzed into abstract ideas such as movement, velocity, and force. Mathematical considerations of spatial and temporal infinitesimals lead to paradoxes. Motion should not be equated with the cause of motion. To say that the quantity of motion is always conserved is to confuse motion itself with the force that causes motion. The force of the cause of motion is conserved. Motion is not an internal, living force in things. It is a lifeless, indifferent effect.

== Motion in space ==
Absolute space contains no bodies. But, as such, it would not be observable. Nothing is denoted by the words "absolute space." Motion and space are relative. They presuppose a relationship to some other body through which they are determined. For a wider view, it would be useful to consider motion relative to the fixed stars, which would be considered as being at rest, instead of to absolute space. Just as we cannot know absolute space, we cannot know whether the whole universe is at rest or is moving uniformly in a direction.

To determine the true nature of motion, we must follow three rules: (1) distinguish mathematical hypotheses from the nature of things; (2) beware of abstractions; (3) consider motion as sensible or imaginable and be content with relative measures.

== Communication of motion ==
Physical science is concerned only with mechanics. Therefore, it can be said that, in a collision, action and reaction are always opposite and equal. Such actions and forces, though, are only mathematical hypotheses. We only really know that the striking body loses motion and the struck body gains motion. We do not know if the motion is communicated from one body to another or if the motion is destroyed in the striker and is created in the struck. In the true nature of things, all bodies are passive. The truly active cause of motion is metaphysical and not the concern of physical science.

== See also ==
- Mach's principle
- Relational space
