= Stoneham =

Stoneham may refer to:

== Places ==
Canada

- Stoneham-et-Tewkesbury, a village
  - Stoneham Mountain Resort, a ski resort located in this village

United Kingdom

- North Stoneham, a settlement and ecclesiastical parish in Hampshire
- South Stoneham, a settlement and ecclesiastical parish in Hampshire

United States

- Stoneham, Colorado, an unincorporated town in Weld County
- Stoneham, Maine, a town in Oxford County
- Stoneham, Massachusetts, a town in Middlesex County
- Stoneham Township, Chippewa County, Minnesota, a township
- Stoneham, Texas, a ghost town in Grimes County

== Other uses ==
- Stoneham (surname)
- Stoneham numbers, a mathematical class of real numbers
- Stonum or Stoneham, the home of George Read, a signatory to the American Declaration of Independence
