= Whitehall Museum House =

Historic house in Rhode Island, United States

- Whitehall
- U.S. National Register of Historic Places
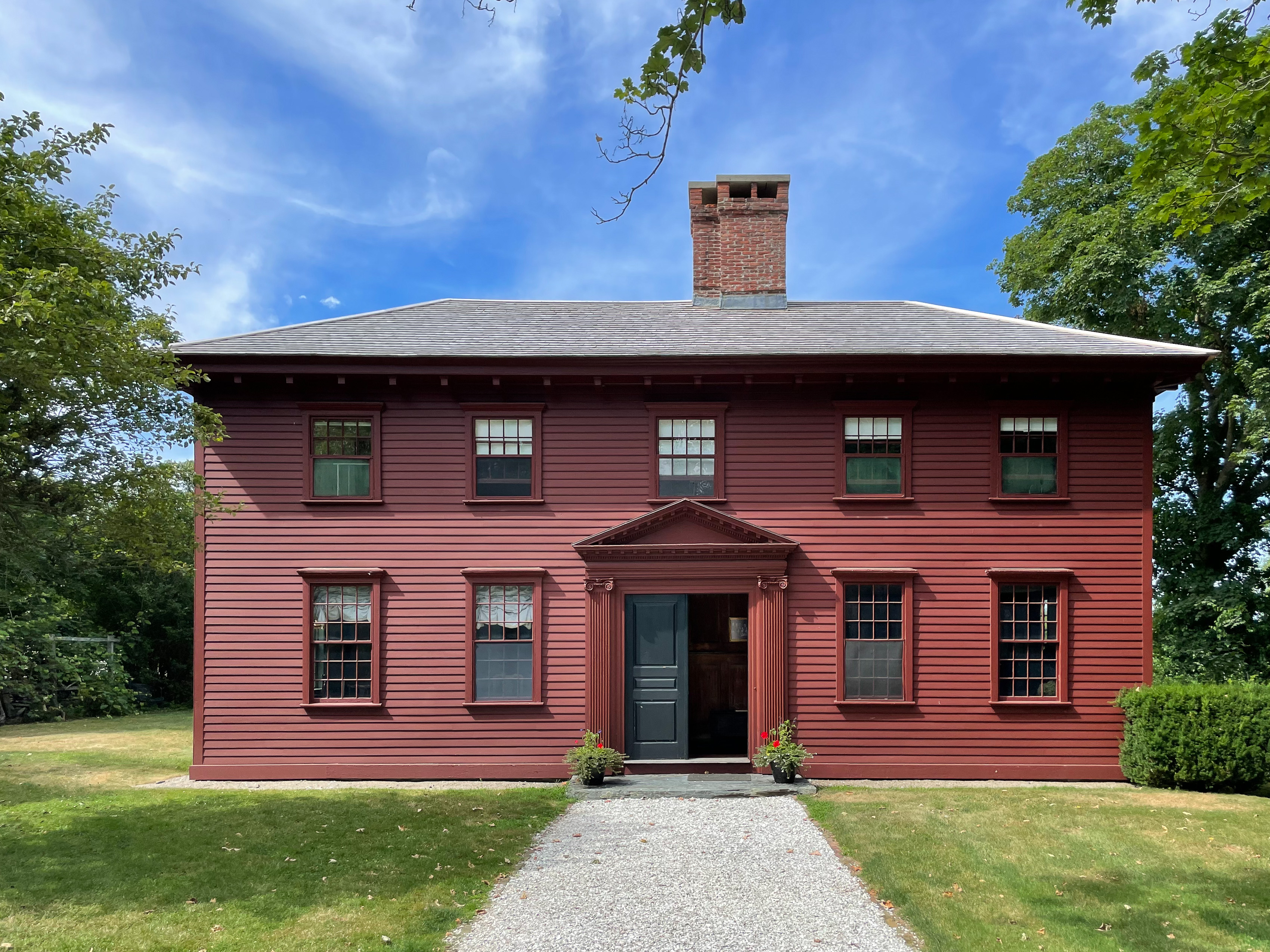
- Whitehall Museum House in 2022

- Location within Rhode Island Location within the United States
- Location: Berkeley Ave., Middletown, Rhode Island
- Coordinates: 41°30′50″N 71°16′20″W
- Built: 1729
- Architectural style: Georgian
- NRHP reference No.: 70000016
- Added to NRHP: April 28, 1970

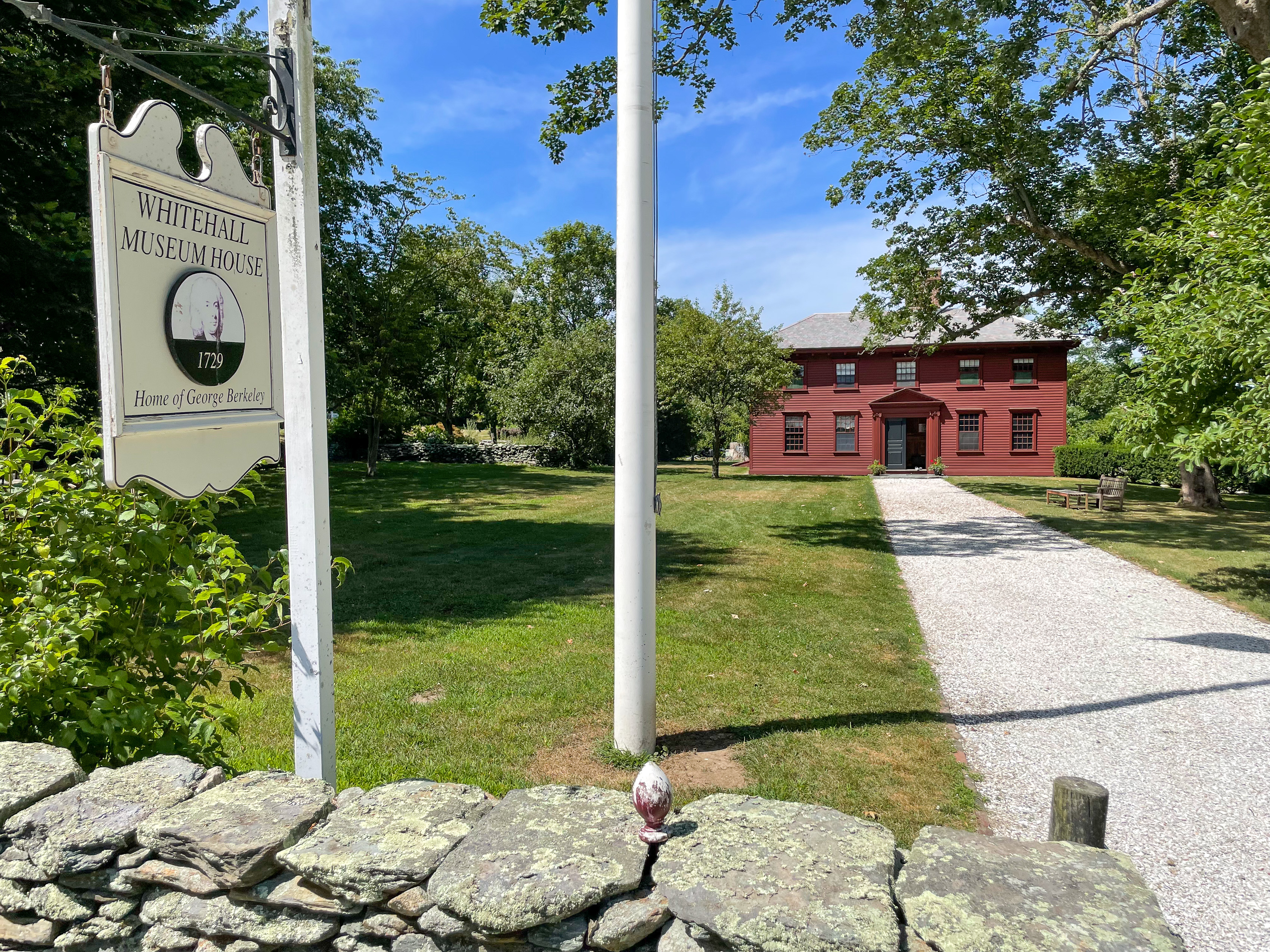
View from street

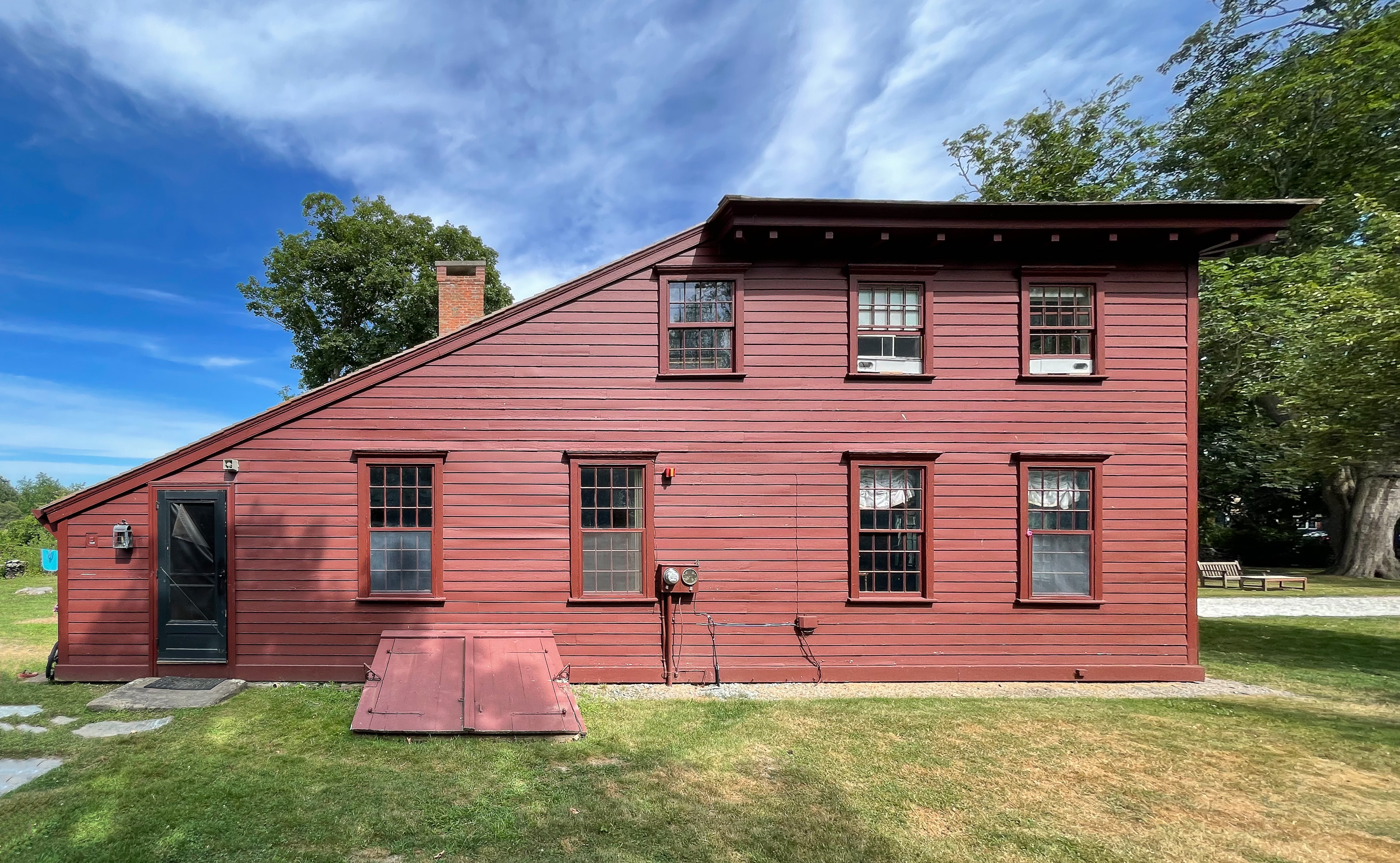
Side view

The Whitehall Museum House is the farmhouse modified by Dean George Berkeley, when he lived in the northern section of Newport, Rhode Island that comprises present-day Middletown in 1729–1731, while working to open his planned St Paul's College on Bermuda. It is also known as Berkeley House or Bishop George Berkeley House and was listed on the National Register of Historic Places in 1970.

== History ==
George Berkeley (1685–1753)—or Bishop Berkeley, the famous Anglo-Irish philosopher—disembarked from his ship in the harbor of Newport, Rhode Island, on Thursday, 23 January 1729. The Reverend James Honyman, minister of Trinity Church, Newport, Rhode Island welcomed Berkeley and the group that accompanied him, inviting him to stay in his home in Newport until he could find accommodation elsewhere. In February 1729, Berkeley purchased a 96-acre (390,000 m^{2}) farm with a small house on it, adjacent to Honeyman's own farm. He also purchased several slaves to work the land. Berkeley enlarged the house to his own design and named it "Whitehall," saying that this was "in loyal remembrance of the palace of the English Kings from Henry VIII to James II." During the period he lived in this house, he wrote his book Alciphron, and occasionally preached for Rev'd Honeyman at nearby Trinity Church, and for Rev'd James McSparran at the St Paul's Church, Wickford (The Old Narragansett Church). In Newport, he founded the Philosophical Society, which eventually developed into the Redwood Library. Berkeley wrote to his friend Thomas Prior of Dublin, Ireland that Newport 'exhibited some of the softest rural and grandest ocean scenery in the world'.

While living at Whitehall, his wife, Anne gave birth to their eldest son, Henry, and to a daughter, Lucia, who died in infancy and was buried in the churchyard at Trinity Church on 5 September 1731. On his departure in September 1731, Berkeley donated his library and the Whitehall property to Yale University, with the stipulation that the income from the property would be used to support three scholars at Yale.

After his return, Berkeley commissioned the London organ-maker, Richard Bridge to provide an organ to Trinity Church, which was installed in 1733.

By 1743, the Whitehall farmhouse was being operated as an inn. The traveler Dr. Alexander Hamilton described a visit to the inn during that year in his Itinerarium, when he was served by a daughter of the proprietor, a grandfather of the future artist Gilbert Stuart. Yale University leased the property for many years as an inn, but, by the late nineteenth century, it had fallen into derelict condition. In 1899, the National Society of the Colonial Dames of America obtained a 999-year lease on the property, and in 1936, commissioned the noted restoration architect Norman Isham to restore two rooms.

The Colonial Dames in Rhode Island maintain the house and garden, which is furnished with period pieces and opened for tours on a limited basis during the summer months, when it is also used by accommodation for scholars specializing in studies on Berkeley.

== See also ==
- National Register of Historic Places listings in Newport County, Rhode Island
