= Kenneth Winkler =

American philosopher (born 1950)

- Born: 1950 (age 75–76)

Philosophical work
- Era: 21st-century philosophy
- Region: Western philosophy
- Institutions: Yale University, Wellesley College, Boston University, Brown, MIT, Brandeis, Harvard
- Main interests: George Berkeley

Kenneth Winkler (born 1950) is an American philosopher and the Kingman Brewster, Jr. Professor of Philosophy Emeritus at Yale University and a specialist in the history of early modern philosophy.

== Education and career ==
Winkler earned his Ph.D. in philosophy from the University of Texas, Austin. Before moving to Yale, he was the Class of 1919 Professor of Philosophy at Wellesley College.

== Philosophical work ==
He is especially known for his works on George Berkeley's thought, but has also published on Locke, Reid, Hume and others.

== Books ==
- Berkeley: An Interpretation. Oxford: Clarendon Press, 1989. ISBN 978-0198249078
- The Cambridge Companion to Berkeley. Ed. Kenneth P. Winkler. Cambridge: Cambridge University Press, 2005. ISBN 978-0521450331
