= Dysart Castle =

Ruined castle in County Kilkenny, Ireland

- County Kilkenny, Ireland
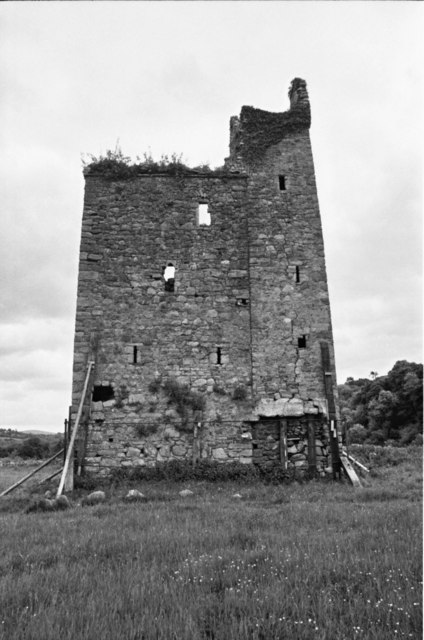
- Castle ruins

Site information
- Type: Medieval castle
- Condition: Ruin, in need of restoration

Location
- Location within Ireland
- Coordinates: 52°30′07″N 7°07′18″W

Site history
- Built: 14th century

Dysart Castle a castle ruins and property just outside Thomastown in County Kilkenny, Ireland.

== History ==
It is best known as the childhood home of George Berkeley (1685–1753), the Irish philosopher for whom Berkeley, California and the Trinity College Dublin Berkeley Library are named. The property is currently privately owned and the castle in urgent need of restoration.

Located south of Thomastown, the site has held a medieval church, the castle, and other buildings. The castle and church property are situated low along the sharp curve of the River Nore. The church was originally adjoined to the castle but the properties were eventually separated by 21 ft. Dysart Castle was small and considered "rudely built," divided by a stone arch, with an access path in the second storey leading into the church. Dysart's lands and structures were granted to the Priory of Kells by founder Geoffrey fitz Robert in 1193. The charter suggests that it was known as Dysart of St. Mo-Colm-óg, or Colman, meaning St. Colman was the patron of the place. The church and castle and surrounding property belonged to the Priory of Kells, until suppression in 1540. Accounts conflict over whether Berkeley was born at Dysart Castle in 1684; he was, however, raised on the grounds of Dysart, his family home which stood beside Dysart Castle.

In the 2000s, with a summary report released in 2009, archaeologist Ben Murtaugh conducted an excavation of the area with the support of funds from the Royal Irish Academy. Ruins of three stone buildings remain above ground on the property and are situated next to or close to each other; four periods of activity were identified with the site. The first period related to the Early Medieval monastic site and church, associated with St. Colman. This included a primary stone church and graveyard, a round house, two cross slabs and Romanesque architectural fragments. In the second period, the site was an out farm or grange of the Augustinian Priory of Kells (c. 1200–1540). This included an extension to the church, the construction of a tower house and the later phases of the graveyard. The third period involved the post-medieval redevelopment of the site, following the abandonment of the graveyard for burials and the church for worship. The church appeared to have been converted into an outhouse or barn. Furthermore, a long dwelling house was constructed to the south of the tower house. In this third period, the place was the childhood home of philosopher George Berkeley (1685–1753).

Due to degradation of structures, Dysart is now considered a romantic ruin. In April 2003, The Irish Times published an urgent appeal for assistance for restoration of Dysart Castle and cited the risk of "imminent collapse" following the emergence of new cracks in the walls of the castle; previously conservation work had been conducted with the aid of Kilkenny County Council acting for the Department of the Environment and private efforts.
