= Alciphron (book) =

1732 treatise by George Berkeley

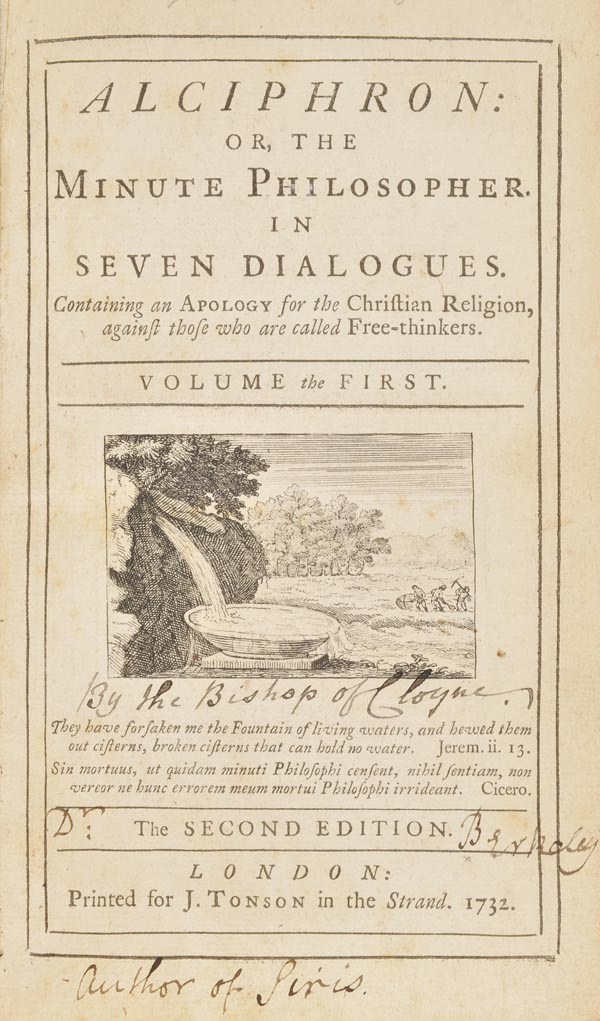
Alciphron title page (1732).

Alciphron, or The Minute Philosopher is a philosophical dialogue by the 18th-century Irish philosopher George Berkeley wherein Berkeley combated the arguments of free-thinkers such as Mandeville and Shaftesbury against the Christian religion. It was completed in 1731, and first published in 1732.

The dialogue is primarily between four characters, the free-thinkers Alciphron and Lysicles, Berkeley's spokesman Euphranor, and Crito, who serves as a spokesman for traditional Christianity. The mostly-silent narrator of the dialogue is given the name Dion.

== Contents ==
The work contains two especially notable sections:

- Dialogue IV, in which Berkeley presents a novel teleological argument for the existence of God based on Berkeley's theory of visual language, defended in the Essay Toward a New Theory of Vision (first published in 1709, and included with the first edition of Alciphron).
- Dialogue VII, in which Berkeley presents a novel theory of language which has been compared with the theory of language advocated by Ludwig Wittgenstein in his Philosophical Investigations.

In a later work, The Theory of Vision Vindicated and Explained (first published in 1733), Berkeley adduced the work of Alberto Radicati as evidence that the views advocated by the character Lysicles were not overly exaggerated (para. 5).

The work expressed Berkeley's anti-Catholicism. In it, he suggested that freethinking, by damaging Protestantism, would leave England open to conversion by Roman Catholic missionaries. In 1742, the Catholic Church responded to the work's anti-Catholic views by placing it on the Index of Forbidden Books, where it remained until the abolition of the Index in 1966.

== Publication ==
It was originally published anonymously under the full title Alciphron: or, the minute philosopher. In seven dialogues. Containing an apology for the Christian religion, against those who are called free-thinkers, printed in London by J. Tonson in 2 volumes. The second volume contains his An Essay towards a New Theory of Vision and so it was not very anonymous.

The posthumous 1755 edition was the first to include Berkeley's name as author. The book was begun while Berkeley was living at Whitehall Farm, Rhode Island, and then finished when he came back to London in 1731.

== Reception ==
The book was criticised by a letter in the Daily Postboy (September 1732) to whom Berkeley replied in his Theory of Vision (1733). Peter Browne, Bishop of Cork, responded to Berkeley in his Divine Analogy (1733). Bernard Mandeville replied in a pamphlet entitled A Letter to Dion (1732). Lord Hervey protested against Alciphron's rationalism in his Some Remarks on the Minute Philosopher (1732). Francis Hutcheson's philosophical criticism appeared in the fourth edition of his Inquiry into the Origin of our Ideas of Beauty and Virtue (1738). The American clergyman Samuel Johnson wrote a more sympathetic review in the Elementa Philosophica (1752).
