= Stoneham (surname) =

Stoneham is a surname. Notable people with the surname include:

- Barry Stoneham, Australian rules footballer
- Ben Stoneham, Baron Stoneham of Droxford, British politician
- Bill Stoneham, American artist and writer
- Charles Stoneham, financier and owner of the New York Giants
- Clive Stoneham, Australian politician
- Horace Stoneham, owner of the New York/San Francisco Giants and son of Charles Stoneham
- Reginald Stoneham (1879–1942), Australian song publisher and composer
- Tom Stoneham, Professor of Philosophy at the University of York
