= Master argument =

That mind-independent objects do not exist because it is impossible to conceive of them

See Diodorus Cronus § Master argument for the classical master argument related to the problem of future contingents.

The master argument is George Berkeley's argument that mind-independent objects do not exist because it is impossible to conceive of them. The argument is against the intuitions that many have and has been widely challenged. The term "Berkeley's master argument" was introduced by Andre Gallois in 1974. His term has firmly become currency of contemporary Berkeley scholarship.

== Overview ==
In order to determine whether it is possible for a tree to exist outside of the mind, we need to be able to think of an unconceived tree. But as soon as we try to think about this tree, we have conceived it. So we have failed and there is no good reason to believe that trees exist outside of the mind.

When we do our utmost to conceive the existence of external bodies, we are all the while only contemplating our own ideas. But the mind taking no notice of itself, is deluded to think it can and doth conceive bodies existing unthought of or without the mind; though at the same time they are apprehended by or exist in it self.

Berkeley's argument is an attempt to show that materialism or a mind-independent world is logically impossible.

== Criticism and response ==
Bertrand Russell among others believed Berkeley's argument "seems to depend for its plausibility upon confusing the thing apprehended with the act of apprehension":

"If we say that the things known must be in the mind, we are either un-duly limiting the mind's power of knowing, or we are uttering a mere tautology. We are uttering a mere tautology if we mean by 'in the mind' the same as by 'before the mind', i.e. if we mean merely being apprehended by the mind. But if we mean this, we shall have to admit that what, in this sense, is in the mind, may nevertheless be not mental. Thus when we realize the nature of knowledge, Berkeley's argument is seen to be wrong in substance as well as in form, and his grounds for supposing that 'idea'—i.e. the objects apprehended—must be mental, are found to have no validity whatever. Hence his grounds in favour of the idealism may be dismissed."

Christopher Peacocke writes that although Berkeley is correct that one cannot imagine an unperceived thing, "all that follows is that the possibility of unperceived material objects cannot be established by appeal to what is imagined. It still could be established by some other route".

Some say that criticisms of Berkeley's argument rely on a misinterpretation of it. Berkeley is not asking us to imagine something unperceived but to imagine that there could be something unperceived, which is a more difficult task. Charles Sanders Peirce agreed with Berkeley that "what we think of cannot possibly be of a different nature from thought itself. For the thought-thinking and the immediate thought-object are the very same thing regarded from different points of view. Therefore, Berkeley was entirely in the right" however he criticised his subjective idealism.

Some claim that Berkeley was not making a master argument at all and that what he was actually trying to show was that the substance 'matter' was actually an abstract concept that passed itself off in peoples' minds as an object of immediate experience. Rather than say that the matter cannot exist, the critics claim, Berkeley is saying that it can only exist as an abstract concept and that this abstract concept was conceptually useless.
