= Tom Stoneham =

British philosopher

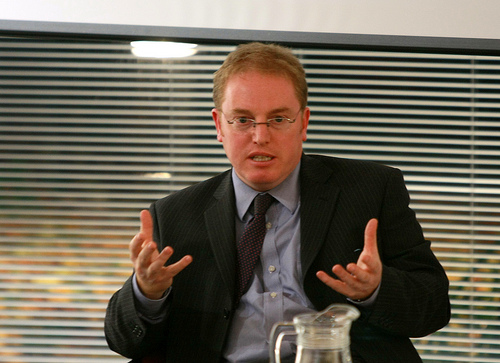
Stoneham in 2009

Thomas William Charles Stoneham is a British philosopher. He has published on a range of topics in metaphysics, epistemology, philosophical logic, and the philosophy of George Berkeley. As of 2023, Stoneham is Professor of Philosophy at the University of York since August 2008 and Head of the Department of Philosophy at York since September 2020. He is Honorary Treasurer of the UK Council for Graduate Education (July 2018–present), an Editorial Board member of White Rose University Press, and a member of the AHRC Peer Review College (June 2014–present).

== Early life and education ==
Stoneham was privately educated at St Edmund's Preparatory School (1977–80) and Rugby School (1980–85), before going up to Oriel College, Oxford to read PPE (1986–89). Stoneham graduated from Oxford with a BA (MA) in 1989 and went on to complete an M.Phil (1991) and Ph.D (1995) at Birkbeck College, London. At Birkbeck, Stoneham's doctoral thesis ('On Knowing What I am Thinking') was supervised by Barry C. Smith.

== Career ==
Stoneham has held academic appointments at the University of Oxford (1994–2000) and the University of York (2000–present), as well as visiting posts at the Catholic University of Lublin (1999), Rhodes University (2001), the Centre for the Study of Mind in Nature (CSMN) at the University of Oslo (2010), and the Shanghai University of Finance and Economics (2014).

Stoneham started as a Junior Lecturer in the sub-faculty of Philosophy at Oxford in 1994. From 1996, he was a Fellow and Tutor in Philosophy at Merton College. In 2000, Stoneham moved to the University of York as a Lecturer. He was promoted to Reader in 2004 and to Professor in 2008. At York, Stoneham has served as Head of the Department of Philosophy (2006–14) and, in January 2015, he was appointed the Inaugural Dean of the Graduate Research School. In 2020, Stoneham stepped down as Dean of the Graduate School and has been appointed to another term as Head of the Department of Philosophy.

Stoneham has published on a variety of philosophical topics, including self-knowledge, metaphysical nihilism, and issues in the philosophy of logic and language. He is primarily known for his work on the philosophy of George Berkeley. He is the author of Berkeley's World: An Examination of the Three Dialogues (OUP, 2002), as well as several journal articles and book chapters on Berkeley.

== Selected publications ==
=== Books ===
- (edited with Paul Lodge) Locke and Leibniz on Substance. Routledge, 2015.
- (edited with Keith Allen) Causation and Modern Philosophy. Routledge, 2011.
- Berkeley's World: An Examination of the Three Dialogues. OUP, 2002.

=== Articles and book chapters ===
- 2019. Dreaming, Phenomenal Character, and Acquaintance. In: Acquaintance: New Essays, eds. Knowles & Raleigh, OUP.
- 2018. Some Issues in Berkeley’s Account of Sense Perception. In: Berkeley's Three Dialogues: New Essays, ed. Storrie, OUP.
- 2017. Berkeley on Abstraction, Universals, and Universal Knowledge. In: The Problem of Universals in Early Modern Philosophy, eds. Di Bella & Schmaltz, OUP.
- 2010. (with David Efird) The Subtraction Argument for Free Mass. Philosophy and Phenomenological Research, 80, 50–7.
- 2009. Time and Truth: The Presentism-Eternalism Debate. Philosophy, 84, 201–18.
- 2006. (with David Efird) Combinatorialism and the Possibility of Nothing. Australasian Journal of Philosophy, 84, 269–80.
- 2005. (with David Efird) The Subtraction Argument for Metaphysical Nihilism. The Journal of Philosophy, 102, 303–325.
- 1998. On Believing that I am Thinking. Proceedings of the Aristotelian Society, 98, 125–44.
