= George Berkeley =

Anglo-Irish philosopher and bishop (1685–1753)

The Right Reverend George Berkeley
- Bishop of Cloyne
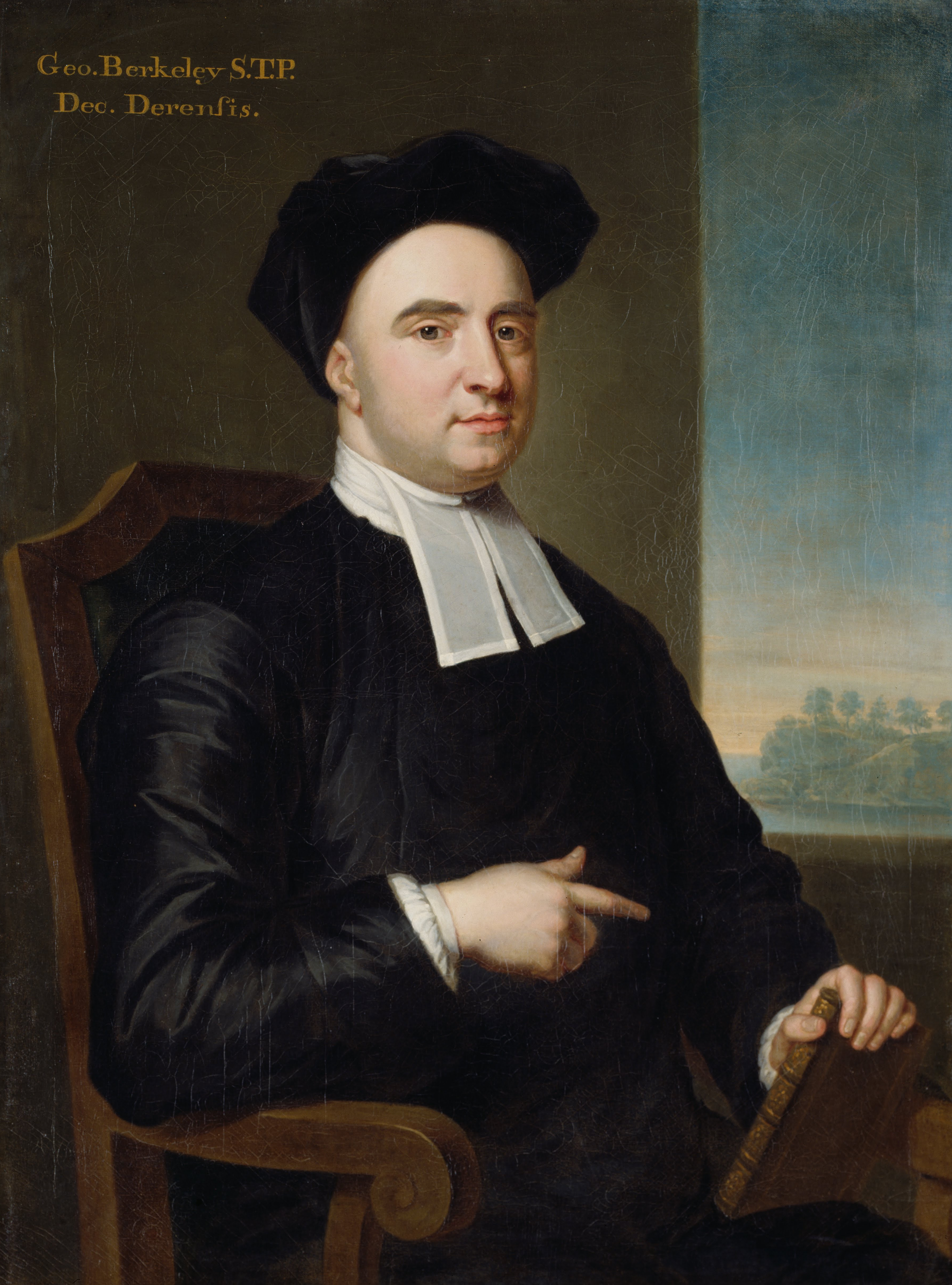
- Portrait by John Smibert, 1727
- Church: Church of Ireland
- Diocese: Cloyne
- In office: 1734–1753
- Predecessor: Edward Synge
- Successor: James Stopford

Orders
- Ordination: 1709 (as deacon); 1710 (as priest)
- Consecration: 18 January 1734

Personal details
- Born: George Berkeley; 12 March 1685 Dysart Castle, Thomastown, County Kilkenny, Ireland
- Died: 14 January 1753 (aged 67) Oxford, England
- Buried: Christ Church Cathedral, Oxford, England
- Denomination: Anglican
- Spouse: Anne Forster (m. 1728)
- Children: 6
- Occupations: Clergyman; Philosopher; writer; theologian
- Known for: Being the founder of subjective idealism, and a leading empiricist

Education
- Education: Kilkenny College; Trinity College Dublin (B.A., 1704; M.A., 1707)

Philosophical work
- Era: 18th-century philosophy
- Region: Western philosophy
- School: Subjective idealism (phenomenalism); Empiricism; Foundationalism; Conceptualism; Indirect realism
- Institutions: Trinity College Dublin
- Main interests: Christianity, metaphysics, epistemology, language, mathematics, perception
- Notable works: An Essay Towards a New Theory of Vision (1709); A Treatise Concerning the Principles of Human Knowledge (1710); Three Dialogues Between Hylas and Philonous (1713); De Motu (1721); Alciphron (1732); The Analyst (1734)
- Notable ideas: Subjective idealism (esse est percipi), master argument, passive obedience
- Website: The International Berkeley Society

Signature
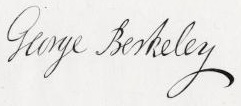

George Berkeley (/ˈbɑːrkli/ BARK-lee; 12 March 1685 – 14 January 1753), known as Bishop Berkeley (Bishop of Cloyne of the Anglican Church of Ireland), was an Anglo-Irish philosopher, writer, and clergyman who is regarded as the founder of immaterialism, a philosophical theory he developed which later came to be known as subjective idealism. He has also been called "the father of idealism" by German philosopher Arthur Schopenhauer. Berkeley played a leading role in the empiricism movement and was one of its pioneers. He was among the most cited philosophers of 18th-century Europe, and his works deeply influenced later thinkers such as Immanuel Kant and David Hume.

In 1709, Berkeley published his first major work An Essay Towards a New Theory of Vision, in which he discussed the limitations of human vision and advanced the theory that the proper objects of sight are not material objects, but light and colour. This foreshadowed his most well-known philosophical work A Treatise Concerning the Principles of Human Knowledge, published in 1710, which, after its poor reception, he rewrote in dialogue form and published under the title Three Dialogues Between Hylas and Philonous in 1713. In this book, Berkeley's views were represented by Philonous (Greek: "lover of mind"), while Hylas ("hyle", Greek: "matter") embodies Berkeley's opponents, in particular John Locke.

Berkeley argued against Isaac Newton's doctrine of absolute space, time and motion in De Motu (On Motion), first published in 1721. His arguments were a notable precursor to those of Ernst Mach and Albert Einstein. In 1732, he published Alciphron, a Christian apologetic against the free-thinkers, and in 1734, he published The Analyst, a critique of the foundations of calculus, which was influential in the development of mathematics. In his work on immaterialism, Berkeley's theory denies the existence of material substance and instead contends that familiar objects like tables and chairs are ideas perceived by the mind and, as a result, cannot exist without being perceived. Berkeley is also known for his critique of abstraction, an important premise in his argument for immaterialism.

He died in 1753 in Oxford, and was buried in Christ Church Cathedral. Berkeley remains arguably the most influential of Irish philosophers, and interest in his ideas and works increased greatly after World War II because they tackled many of the issues of paramount interest to philosophy in the 20th century, such as the problems of perception, the difference between primary and secondary qualities, and the importance of language. Public interest in his views and philosophical ideas increased significantly in the United States during the early 19th century, and as a result, the University of California, Berkeley, the city of Berkeley, California, and Berkeley College, Yale, were all named after him.

== Biography ==
=== Ireland ===
Berkeley was born at his family home, Dysart Castle, near Thomastown, County Kilkenny, Ireland, the eldest son of William Berkeley, a cadet of the noble family of Berkeley whose ancestry can be traced back to the Anglo-Saxon period and who had served as feudal lords and landowners in Gloucestershire, England. Little is known of his mother. He was the oldest of six brothers.

He was educated at Kilkenny College and attended Trinity College Dublin. He was elected a Scholar in 1702. He was awarded BA in 1704 and MA and a Junior Fellowship in 1707. He remained at Trinity College after the completion of his degree as a librarian, lecturer in Greek language and preacher.

His earliest publication was on mathematics, but the first that brought him notice was his An Essay towards a New Theory of Vision, first published in 1709. In the essay, Berkeley examines visual distance, magnitude, position and problems of sight and touch. While this work raised much controversy at the time, its conclusions are now accepted as an established part of the theory of optics.

He was ordained as a priest in 1710; however the Archbishop of Dublin (William King) had not been consulted about this, which led to a court case.

The next publication to appear was the Treatise Concerning the Principles of Human Knowledge in 1710. His belief was that the physical world and material objects are merely collections of ideas, and that they only exist when they are perceived. This publication had great success and gave him a lasting reputation, though few accepted his theory that nothing exists outside the mind. This was followed in 1713 by Three Dialogues Between Hylas and Philonous. This publication propound his system of philosophy, the leading principle of which is that the world, as represented by our senses, depends for its existence on being perceived.

For this theory, the Principles gives the exposition and the Dialogues the defence. One of his main objectives was to combat the prevailing materialism of his time. The theory was largely received with ridicule, while even those such as Samuel Clarke and William Whiston, who did acknowledge his "extraordinary genius," were nevertheless convinced that his first principles were false.

=== England and Europe ===
Shortly afterwards, Berkeley visited England and was received into the circle of Addison, Pope and Steele. In the period between 1714 and 1720, he interspersed his academic endeavours with periods of extensive travel in Europe, including one of the most extensive Grand Tours of the length and breadth of Italy ever undertaken. In 1721, he took Holy orders in the Church of Ireland, earning his doctorate in divinity, and once again chose to remain at Trinity College Dublin, lecturing this time in Divinity and in Hebrew. In 1721/2 he was made Dean of Dromore and, in 1724, Dean of Derry.

In 1723, Berkeley was named co-heir of Esther Vanhomrigh, along with the barrister Robert Marshall. This naming followed Vanhomrigh's violent quarrel with Jonathan Swift, who had been her intimate friend for many years. Vanhomrigh's choice of legatees caused a good deal of surprise since she did not know either of them well, although Berkeley as a very young man had known her father. Swift said that he did not grudge Berkeley his inheritance, much of which vanished in a lawsuit in any event. A story that Berkeley and Marshall disregarded a condition of the inheritance that they must publish the correspondence between Swift and Vanessa is probably untrue.

In 1725, Berkeley began the project of founding a college in Bermuda for training ministers and missionaries in the colony, in pursuit of which he gave up his deanery with its income of £1,100.

=== Marriage and America ===
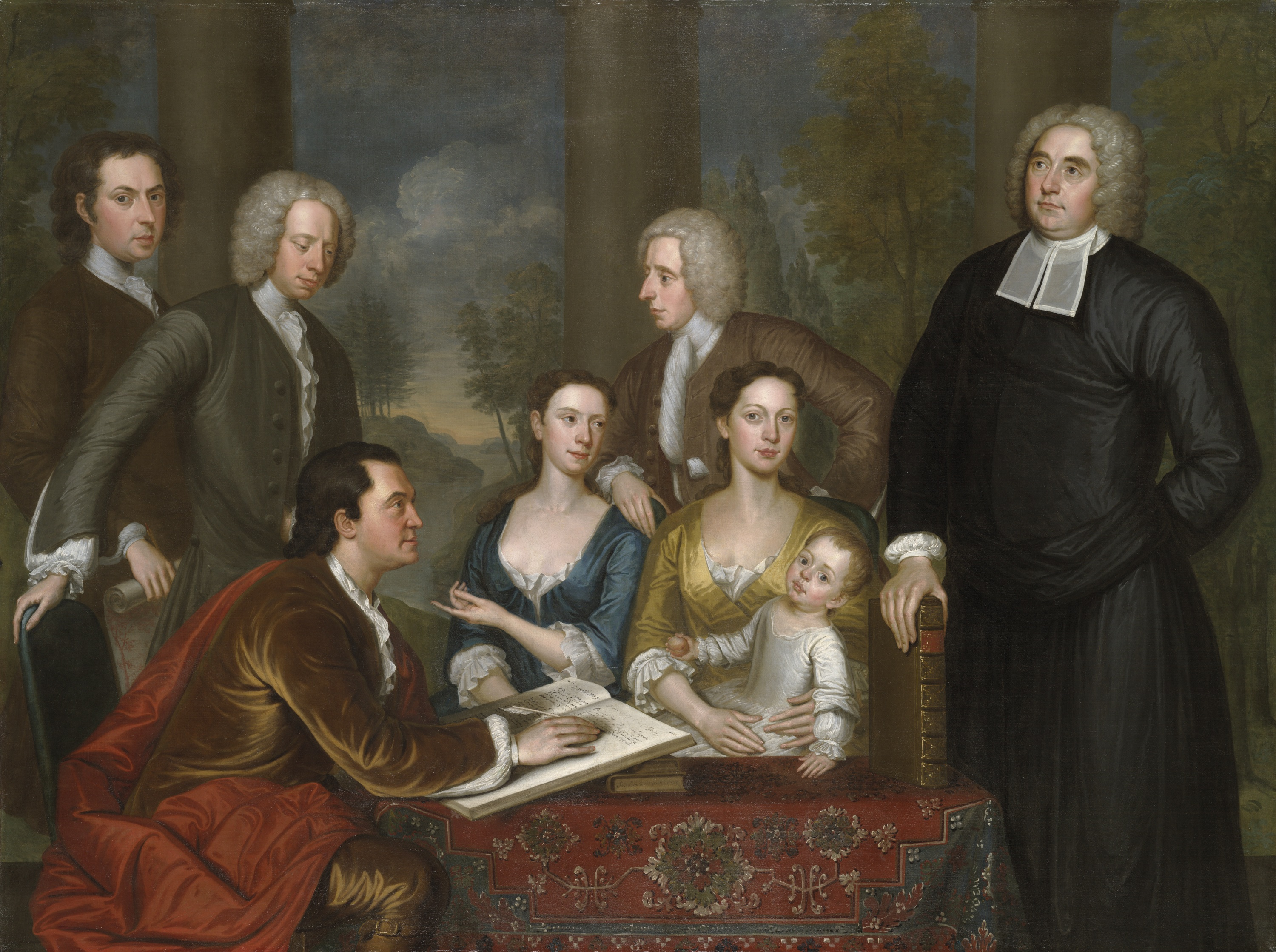
A group portrait of Berkeley and his entourage by John Smibert

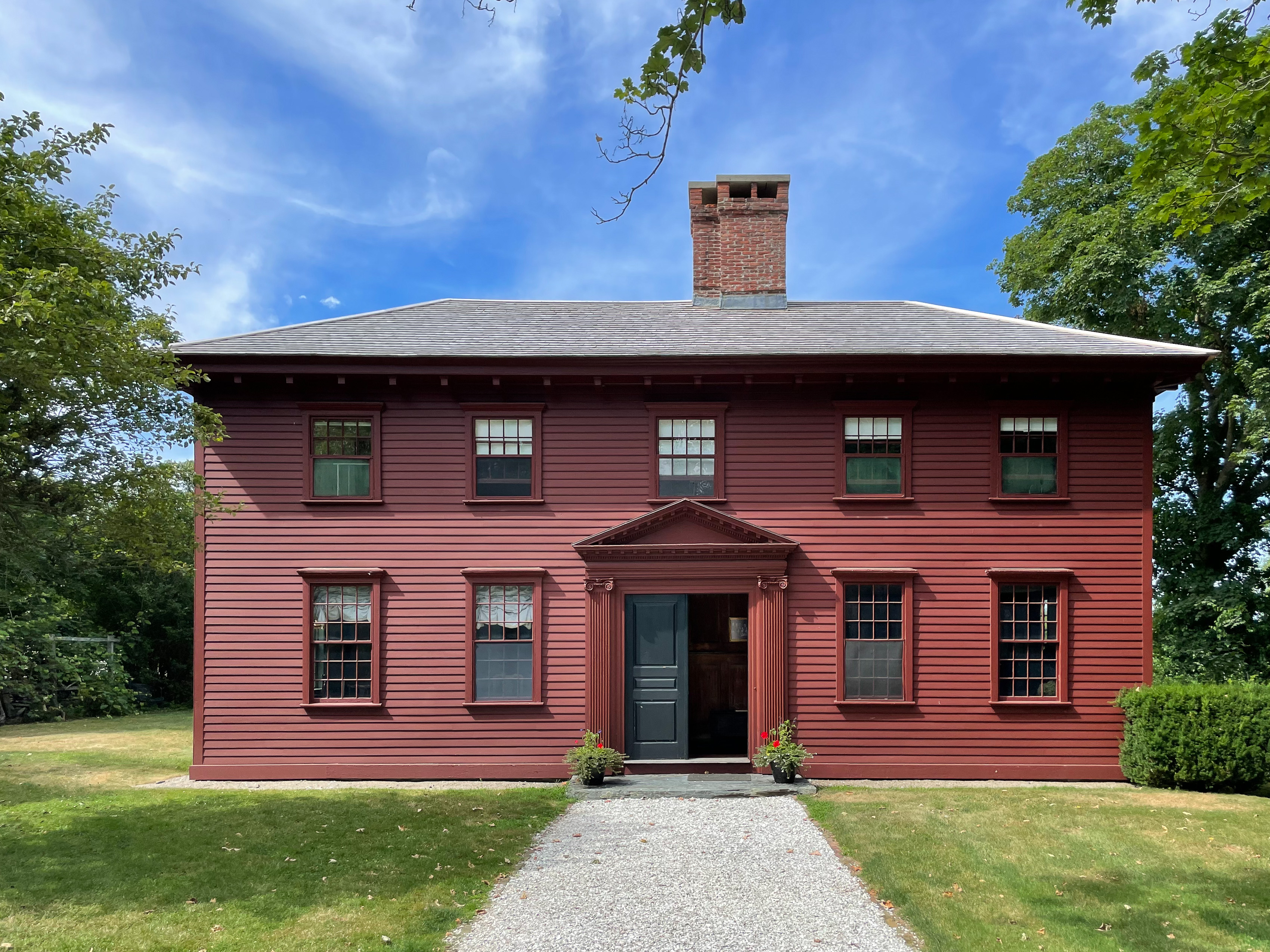
Whitehall, Berkeley's home in Middletown, Rhode Island

On 1 August 1728 at St Mary le Strand, London, Berkeley married Anne Forster, daughter of John Forster, Chief Justice of the Irish Common Pleas, and Forster's first wife Rebecca Monck. He then went to America on a salary of £100 per annum. He landed near Newport, Rhode Island, where he bought a plantation at Middletown – the famous "Whitehall". Berkeley purchased several enslaved Africans to work on the plantation. In 2023, Trinity College Dublin removed Berkeley's name from one of its libraries because of his slave ownership and his active defence of slavery.

It has been claimed that "he introduced Palladianism into America by borrowing a design from [William] Kent's Designs of Inigo Jones for the door-case of his house in Rhode Island, Whitehall". He also brought to New England John Smibert, the Scottish artist he "discovered" in Italy, who is generally regarded as the founding father of American portrait painting. Meanwhile, he drew up plans for the ideal city he planned to build on Bermuda. He lived at the plantation while he waited for funds for his college to arrive. The funds, however, were not forthcoming. "With the withdrawal from London of his own persuasive energies, opposition gathered force; and the Prime Minister, Walpole grew steadily more sceptical and lukewarm. At last it became clear that the essential Parliamentary grant would be not forthcoming", and in 1732 he left America and returned to London.

He and Anne had four children who survived infancy – Henry, George, William and Julia – and at least two others who did not. William's death in 1751 was a great cause of grief for his father.

=== Episcopate in Ireland ===
Berkeley was nominated to be the Bishop of Cloyne in the Church of Ireland on 18 January 1734. He was consecrated as such on 19 May 1734. He was the Bishop of Cloyne until his death on 14 January 1753, although he died at Oxford (see below).

=== Humanitarian work ===
While living in London's Saville Street, he took part in efforts to create a home for the city's abandoned children. The Foundling Hospital was founded by royal charter in 1739, and Berkeley is listed as one of its original governors.

=== Last works ===
His last two publications were Siris: A Chain of Philosophical Reflexions and Inquiries Concerning the Virtues of Tarwater, And divers other Subjects connected together and arising one from another (1744) and Further Thoughts on Tar-water (1752). Pine tar is an effective antiseptic and disinfectant when applied to cuts on the skin, but Berkeley argued for the use of pine tar as a broad panacea for diseases. His 1744 work on tar-water sold more copies than any of his other books during Berkeley's lifetime.

He remained at Cloyne until 1752, when he retired. With his wife and daughter Julia, he went to Oxford to live with his son George and supervise his education. He died soon afterwards and was buried in Christ Church Cathedral, Oxford. His affectionate disposition and genial manners made him much loved and held in warm regard by many of his contemporaries. Anne outlived her husband by many years, and died in 1786.

== Contributions to philosophy ==
According to Berkeley there are only two kinds of things: spirits and ideas. Spirits are simple, active beings which produce and perceive ideas; ideas are passive beings which are produced and perceived.

The use of the concepts of "spirit" and "idea" is central in Berkeley's philosophy. As used by him, these concepts are difficult to translate into modern terminology. His concept of "spirit" is close to the concept of "conscious subject" or of "mind", and the concept of "idea" is close to the concept of "sensation" or "state of mind" or "conscious experience".

Thus Berkeley denied the existence of matter as a metaphysical substance, but did not deny the existence of physical objects such as apples or mountains ("I do not argue against the existence of any one thing that we can apprehend, either by sense or reflection. That the things I see with mine eyes and touch with my hands do exist, really exist, I make not the least question. The only thing whose existence we deny, is that which philosophers call matter or corporeal substance. And in doing of this, there is no damage done to the rest of mankind, who, I dare say, will never miss it.", Principles #35). This basic claim of Berkeley's thought, his "idealism", is sometimes and somewhat derisively called "immaterialism" or, occasionally, subjective idealism. In Principles #3, he wrote, using a combination of Latin and English, esse is percipi (to be is to be perceived), most often if slightly inaccurately attributed to Berkeley as the pure Latin phrase esse est percipi. The phrase appears associated with him in authoritative philosophical sources, e.g., "Berkeley holds that there are no such mind-independent things, that, in the famous phrase, esse est percipi (aut percipere)—to be is to be perceived (or to perceive)."

Hence, human knowledge is reduced to two elements: that of spirits and of ideas (Principles #86). In contrast to ideas, a spirit cannot be perceived. A person's spirit, which perceives ideas, is to be comprehended intuitively by inward feeling or reflection (Principles #89). For Berkeley, we have no direct 'idea' of spirits, albeit we have good reason to believe in the existence of other spirits, for their existence explains the purposeful regularities we find in experience ("It is plain that we cannot know the existence of other spirits otherwise than by their operations, or the ideas by them excited in us", Dialogues #145). This is the solution that Berkeley offers to the problem of other minds. Finally, the order and purposefulness of the whole of our experience of the world and especially of nature overwhelms us into believing in the existence of an extremely powerful and intelligent spirit that causes that order. According to Berkeley, reflection on the attributes of that external spirit leads us to identify it with God. Thus a material thing such as an apple consists of a collection of ideas (shape, colour, taste, physical properties, etc.) which are caused in the spirits of humans by the spirit of God.

=== Theology ===
A convinced adherent of Christianity, Berkeley believed God to be present as an immediate cause of all our experiences.

He did not evade the question of the external source of the diversity of the sense data at the disposal of the human individual. He strove simply to show that the causes of sensations could not be things, because what we called things, and considered without grounds to be something different from our sensations, were built up wholly from sensations. There must consequently be some other external source of the inexhaustible diversity of sensations. The source of our sensations, Berkeley concluded, could only be God; He gave them to man, who had to see in them signs and symbols that carried God's word.

Here is Berkeley's proof of the existence of God:

Whatever power I may have over my own thoughts, I find the ideas actually perceived by Sense have not a like dependence on my will. When in broad daylight I open my eyes, it is not in my power to choose whether I shall see or no, or to determine what particular objects shall present themselves to my view; and so likewise as to the hearing and other senses; the ideas imprinted on them are not creatures of my will. There is therefore some other Will or Spirit that produces them. (Berkeley. Principles #29)

As T. I. Oizerman explained:

Berkeley's mystic idealism (as Kant aptly christened it) claimed that nothing separated man and God (except materialist misconceptions, of course), since nature or matter did not exist as a reality independent of consciousness. The revelation of God was directly accessible to man, according to this doctrine; it was the sense-perceived world, the world of man's sensations, which came to him from on high for him to decipher and so grasp the divine purpose.

Berkeley believed that God is not the distant engineer of Newtonian machinery that in the fullness of time led to the growth of a tree in the university quadrangle. Rather, the perception of the tree is an idea that God's mind has produced in the mind, and the tree continues to exist in the quadrangle when "nobody" is there, simply because God is an infinite mind that perceives all.

The philosophy of David Hume concerning causality and objectivity is an elaboration of another aspect of Berkeley's philosophy. A.A. Luce, the most eminent Berkeley scholar of the 20th century, constantly stressed the continuity of Berkeley's philosophy. The fact that Berkeley returned to his major works throughout his life, issuing revised editions with only minor changes, also counts against any theory that attributes to him a significant volte-face.

Yet as Colin Murray Turbayne observed, late entries found amidst Berkeley's unpublished private notes in the Philosophical Commentaries point toward his inclination to withdraw from a dogmatic form of ontological idealism in order to adopt a more skeptical attitude toward the existence of an active, universal substantial mind such as God. Here, Berkeley's "official doctrine" that "Mind is a substance." in a literal sense is accompanied by additional puzzling references to a universal "thinking substance, something unknown" (687) and "the substance of Spirit we do not know, it not being knowable" (701). In his exegesis of the term "substance", and his description of the soul as a substance in which ideas "inhere" while it "supports" ideas, Berkeley also asserts that he must "use utmost caution not to give give the least handle of offense to the Church or Church-men (715)". Keeping in mind Berkeley's development of a philosophy of science and his theory of vision, this suggests that his final references to God as a universal and "substantial mind" are essentially metaphorical in nature and indicate a willingness to diplomatically uphold a "purely substantivalist conception of the mind, confirmed by his private utterances".

=== Relativity arguments ===
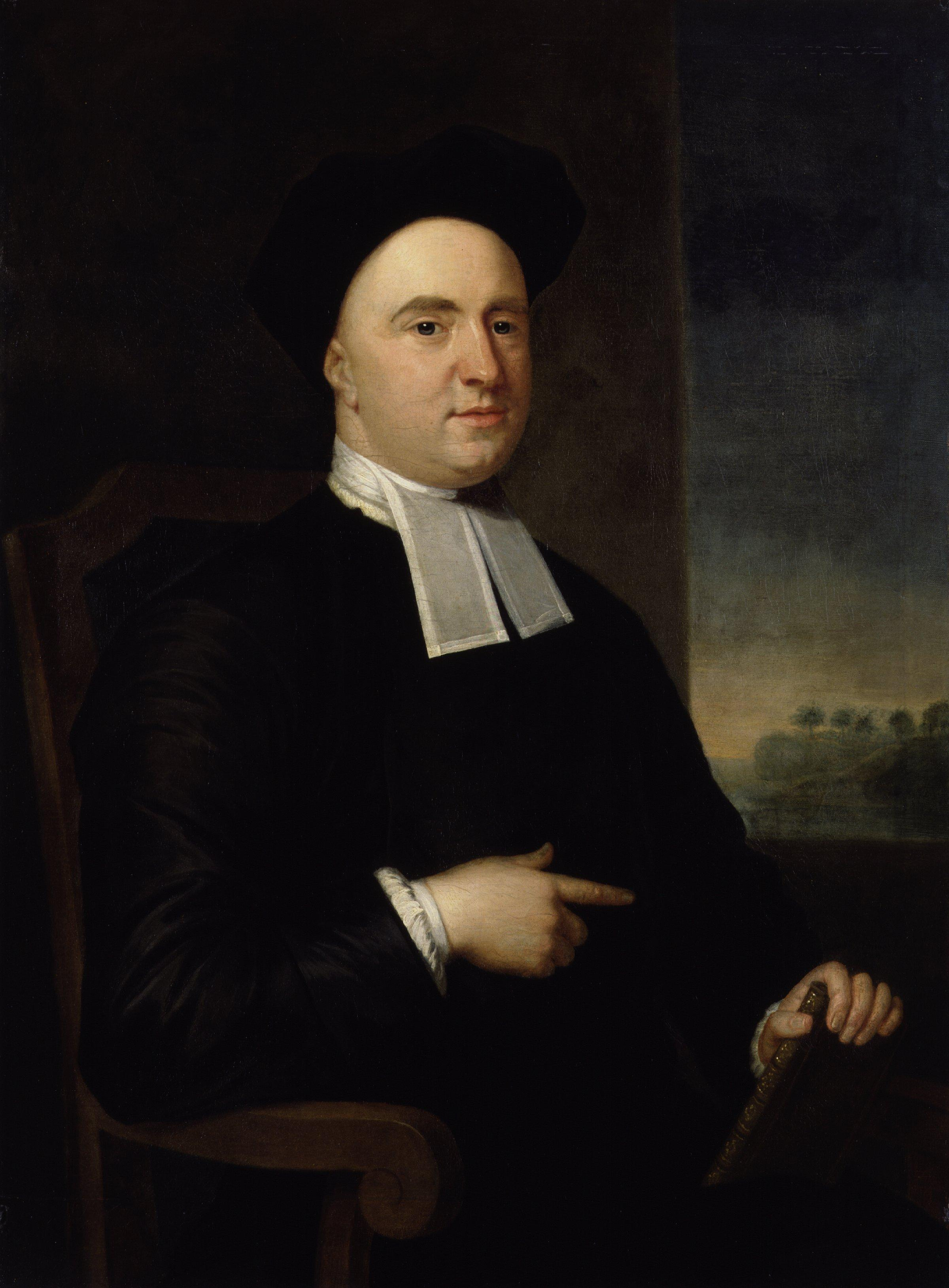
1730 portrait of Berkeley by John Smibert

John Locke (Berkeley's intellectual predecessor) states that we define an object by its primary and secondary qualities. He takes heat as an example of a secondary quality. If you put one hand in a bucket of cold water, and the other hand in a bucket of warm water, then put both hands in a bucket of lukewarm water, one of your hands is going to tell you that the water is cold and the other that the water is hot. Locke says that since two different objects (both your hands) perceive the water to be hot and cold, then the heat is not a quality of the water.

While Locke used this argument to distinguish primary from secondary qualities, Berkeley extends it to cover primary qualities in the same way. For example, he says that size is not a quality of an object because the size of the object depends on the distance between the observer and the object, or the size of the observer. Since an object is a different size to different observers, then size is not a quality of the object. Berkeley rejects shape with a similar argument and then asks: if neither primary qualities nor secondary qualities are of the object, then how can we say that there is anything more than the qualities we observe?

Relativity is the idea that there is no objective, universal truth; it is a state of dependence in which the existence of one independent object is solely dependent on that of another. According to Locke, characteristics of primary qualities are mind-independent, such as shape, size, etc., whereas secondary qualities are mind-dependent, for example, taste and colour. George Berkeley refuted John Locke's belief on primary and secondary qualities because Berkeley believed that "we cannot abstract the primary qualities (e.g shape) from secondary ones (e.g colour)". Berkeley argued that perception is dependent on the distance between the observer and the object, and "thus, we cannot conceive of mechanist material bodies which are extended but not (in themselves) colored". What perceived can be the same type of quality, but completely opposite from each other because of different positions and perceptions, what we perceive can be different even when the same types of things consist of contrary qualities. Secondary qualities aid in people's conception of primary qualities in an object, like how the colour of an object leads people to recognize the object itself. More specifically, the colour red can be perceived in apples, strawberries, and tomatoes, yet we would not know what these might look like without its colour. We would also be unaware of what the colour red looked like if red paint, or any object that has a perceived red colour, failed to exist. From this, we can see that colours cannot exist on their own and can solely represent a group of perceived objects. Therefore, both primary and secondary qualities are mind-dependent: they cannot exist without our minds.

George Berkeley was a philosopher who opposed rationalism and "classical" empiricism. He was a "subjective idealist" or "empirical idealist", who believed that reality is constructed entirely of immaterial, conscious minds and their ideas; everything that exists is somehow dependent on the subject perceiving it, except the subject themselves. He refuted the existence of abstract objects that many other philosophers believed to exist, notably Plato. According to Berkeley, "an abstract object does not exist in space or time and which is therefore entirely non-physical and non-mental"; however, this argument contradicts his relativity argument. If "esse est percipi", (Latin meaning that to exist is to be perceived) is true, then the objects in the relativity argument made by Berkeley can either exist or not. Berkeley believed that only the minds' perceptions and the Spirit that perceives are what exists in reality; what people perceive every day is only the idea of an object's existence, but the objects themselves are not perceived. Berkeley also discussed how, at times, materials cannot be perceived by oneself, and the mind of oneself cannot understand the objects. However, there also exists an "omnipresent, eternal mind" that Berkeley believed to consist of God and the Spirit, both omniscient and all-perceiving. According to Berkeley, God is the entity who controls everything, yet Berkeley also argued that "abstract object[s] do not exist in space or time". In other words, as Warnock argues, Berkeley "had recognized that he could not square with his own talk of spirits, of our minds and of God; for these are perceivers and not among objects of perception. Thus he says, rather weakly and without elucidation, that in addition to our ideas, we also have notions—we know what it means to speak of spirits and their operations."

However, the relativity argument violates the idea of immaterialism. Berkeley's immaterialism argues that "esse est percipi (aut percipere)", which in English is: to be is to be perceived (or to perceive). That is saying only what is perceived or perceived is real, and without our perception or God's nothing can be real. Yet, if the relativity argument, also by Berkeley, argues that the perception of an object depends on the different positions, then this means that what is perceived can either be real or not because the perception does not show that whole picture and the whole picture cannot be perceived. Berkeley also believes that "when one perceives mediately, one perceives one idea by means of perceiving another". By this, it can be elaborated that if the standards of what perceived at first are different, what perceived after that can be different, as well. In the heat perception described above, one hand perceived the water to be hot and the other hand perceived the water to be cold due to relativity. If applying the idea "to be is to be perceived", the water should be both cold and hot because both perceptions are perceived by different hands. However, the water cannot be cold and hot at the same time for it self-contradicts, so this shows that what perceived is not always true because it sometimes can break the law of noncontradiction. In this case, "it would be arbitrary anthropocentrism to claim that humans have special access to the true qualities of objects". The truth for different people can be different, and humans are limited to accessing the absolute truth due to relativity. Summing up, nothing can be absolutely true due to relativity or the two arguments, to be is to be perceived and the relativity argument, do not always work together.

=== New theory of vision ===
In his Essay Towards a New Theory of Vision, Berkeley frequently criticised the views of the Optic Writers, a title that seems to include Molyneux, Wallis, Malebranche and Descartes. In sections 1–51, Berkeley argued against the classical scholars of optics by holding that: spatial depth, as the distance that separates the perceiver from the perceived object is itself invisible. That is, we do not see space directly or deduce its form logically using the laws of optics. Space for Berkeley is no more than a contingent expectation that visual and tactile sensations will follow one another in regular sequences that we come to expect through habit.

Berkeley goes on to argue that visual cues, such as the perceived extension or 'confusion' of an object, can only be used to indirectly judge distance, because the viewer learns to associate visual cues with tactile sensations. Berkeley gives the following analogy regarding indirect distance perception: one perceives distance indirectly just as one perceives a person's embarrassment indirectly. When looking at an embarrassed person, we infer indirectly that the person is embarrassed by observing the red colour on the person's face. We know through experience that a red face tends to signal embarrassment, as we've learned to associate the two.

The question concerning the visibility of space was central to the Renaissance perspective tradition and its reliance on classical optics in the development of pictorial representations of spatial depth. This matter has been debated by scholars since the 11th-century Arab polymath and mathematician Alhazen (Abū ʿAlī al-Ḥasan ibn al-Ḥasan ibn al-Haytham) affirmed in experimental contexts the visibility of space. This issue, which was raised in Berkeley's theory of vision, was treated at length in the Phenomenology of Perception of Maurice Merleau-Ponty, in the context of confirming the visual perception of spatial depth (la profondeur), and by way of refuting Berkeley's thesis.

Berkeley wrote about the perception of size in addition to that of distance. He is frequently misquoted as believing in size–distance invariance—a view held by the Optic Writers. This idea is that we scale the image size according to distance in a geometrical manner. The error may have become commonplace because the eminent historian and psychologist E. G. Boring perpetuated it. In fact, Berkeley argued that the same cues that evoke distance also evoke size, and that we do not first see size and then calculate distance. It is worth quoting Berkeley's words on this issue (Section 53):

What inclines men to this mistake (beside the humour of making one see by geometry) is, that the same perceptions or ideas which suggest distance, do also suggest magnitude ... I say they do not first suggest distance, and then leave it to the judgement to use that as a medium, whereby to collect the magnitude; but they have as close and immediate a connexion with the magnitude as with the distance; and suggest magnitude as independently of distance, as they do distance independently of magnitude.

Berkeley claimed that his visual theories were "vindicated" by a 1728 report regarding the recovery of vision in a 13-year-old boy operated for congenital cataracts by surgeon William Cheselden. In 2021, the name of Cheselden's patient was published for the first time: Daniel Dolins. Berkeley knew the Dolins family, had numerous social links to Cheselden, including the poet Alexander Pope, and Princess Caroline, to whom Cheselden's patient was presented. The report misspelt Cheselden's name, used language typical of Berkeley, and may even have been ghost-written by Berkeley. Unfortunately, Dolins was never able to see well enough to read, and there is no evidence that the surgery improved Dolins' vision at any point prior to his death at age 30.

=== Philosophy of physics ===
"Berkeley's works display his keen interest in natural philosophy [...] from his earliest writings (Arithmetica, 1707) to his latest (Siris, 1744). Moreover, much of his philosophy is shaped fundamentally by his engagement with the science of his time." The profundity of this interest can be judged from numerous entries in Berkeley's Philosophical Commentaries (1707–1708), e.g. "Mem. to Examine & accurately discuss the scholium of the 8th Definition of Mr Newton's Principia." (#316)

Berkeley argued that forces and gravity, as defined by Newton, constituted "occult qualities" that "expressed nothing distinctly". He held that those who posited "something unknown in a body of which they have no idea and which they call the principle of motion, are in fact simply stating that the principle of motion is unknown". Therefore, those who "affirm that active force, action, and the principle of motion are really in bodies are adopting an opinion not based on experience". Forces and gravity existed nowhere in the phenomenal world. On the other hand, if they resided in the category of "soul" or "incorporeal thing", they "do not properly belong to physics" as a matter. Berkeley thus concluded that forces lay beyond any kind of empirical observation and could not be a part of proper science. He proposed his theory of signs as a means to explain motion and matter without reference to the "occult qualities" of force and gravity.

=== Berkeley's razor ===
Berkeley's razor is a rule of reasoning proposed by the philosopher Karl Popper in his study of Berkeley's key scientific work De Motu. Berkeley's razor is considered by Popper to be similar to Occam's razor but "more powerful". It represents an extreme, empiricist view of scientific observation that states that the scientific method provides us with no true insight into the nature of the world. Rather, the scientific method gives us a variety of partial explanations about regularities that hold in the world and that are gained through experiments. The nature of the world, according to Berkeley, is only approached through proper metaphysical speculation and reasoning. Popper summarises Berkeley's razor as such:

A general practical result—which I propose to call "Berkeley's razor"—of [Berkeley's] analysis of physics allows us a priori to eliminate from physical science all essentialist explanations. If they have a mathematical and predictive content they may be admitted qua mathematical hypotheses (while their essentialist interpretation is eliminated). If not they may be ruled out altogether. This razor is sharper than Ockham's: all entities are ruled out except those which are perceived.

In another essay of the same book titled "Three Views Concerning Human Knowledge", Popper argues that Berkeley is to be considered as an instrumentalist philosopher, along with Robert Bellarmine, Pierre Duhem and Ernst Mach. According to this approach, scientific theories have the status of serviceable fictions, useful inventions aimed at explaining facts, and without any pretension to being true. Popper contrasts instrumentalism with the above-mentioned essentialism and his own "critical rationalism".

=== Philosophy of mathematics ===
In addition to his contributions to philosophy, Berkeley was also very influential in the development of mathematics, although in a rather indirect sense. "Berkeley was concerned with mathematics and its philosophical interpretation from the earliest stages of his intellectual life." Berkeley's "Philosophical Commentaries" (1707–1708) witness to his interest in mathematics:

Axiom. No reasoning about things whereof we have no idea. Therefore no reasoning about Infinitesimals. (#354)

Take away the signs from Arithmetic & Algebra, & pray what remains? (#767)

These are sciences purely Verbal, & entirely useless but for Practise in Societys of Men. No speculative knowledge, no comparison of Ideas in them. (#768)

In 1707, Berkeley published two treatises on mathematics. In 1734, he published The Analyst, subtitled A DISCOURSE Addressed to an Infidel Mathematician, a critique of calculus. Florian Cajori called this treatise "the most spectacular event of the century in the history of British mathematics." However, a recent study suggests that Berkeley misunderstood Leibnizian calculus. The mathematician in question is believed to have been either Edmond Halley, or Isaac Newton himself—though if to the latter, then the discourse was posthumously addressed, as Newton died in 1727. The Analyst represented a direct attack on the foundations and principles of calculus and, in particular, the notion of fluxion or infinitesimal change, which Newton and Leibniz used to develop the calculus. In his critique, Berkeley coined the phrase "ghosts of departed quantities", familiar to students of calculus. Ian Stewart's book From Here to Infinity captures the gist of his criticism.

Berkeley regarded his criticism of calculus as part of his broader campaign against the religious implications of Newtonian mechanics – as a defence of traditional Christianity against deism, which tends to distance God from His worshipers. Specifically, he observed that both Newtonian and Leibnizian calculus employed infinitesimals sometimes as positive, nonzero quantities and other times as a number explicitly equal to zero. Berkeley's key point in "The Analyst" was that Newton's calculus (and the laws of motion based on calculus) lacked rigorous theoretical foundations. He claimed that:

In every other Science Men prove their Conclusions by their Principles, and not their Principles by the Conclusions. But if in yours you should allow your selves this unnatural way of proceeding, the Consequence would be that you must take up with Induction, and bid adieu to Demonstration. And if you submit to this, your Authority will no longer lead the way in Points of Reason and Science.

Berkeley did not doubt that calculus produced real-world truth; simple physics experiments could verify that Newton's method did what it claimed to do. "The cause of Fluxions cannot be defended by reason", but the results could be defended by empirical observation, Berkeley's preferred method of acquiring knowledge at any rate. Berkeley, however, found it paradoxical that "Mathematicians should deduce true Propositions from false Principles, be right in Conclusion, and yet err in the Premises." In The Analyst he endeavoured to show "how Error may bring forth Truth, though it cannot bring forth Science". Newton's science, therefore, could not on purely scientific grounds justify its conclusions, and the mechanical, deistic model of the universe could not be rationally justified.

The difficulties raised by Berkeley were still present in the work of Cauchy whose approach to calculus was a combination of infinitesimals and a notion of limit, and were eventually sidestepped by Weierstrass by means of his (ε, δ) approach, which eliminated infinitesimals altogether. More recently, Abraham Robinson restored infinitesimal methods in his 1966 book Non-standard analysis by showing that they can be used rigorously.

=== Moral philosophy ===
The tract A Discourse on Passive Obedience (1712) is considered Berkeley's major contribution to moral and political philosophy.

In A Discourse on Passive Obedience, Berkeley defends the thesis that people have "a moral duty to observe the negative precepts (prohibitions) of the law, including the duty not to resist the execution of punishment." However, Berkeley does make exceptions to this sweeping moral statement, stating that we need not observe precepts of "usurpers or even madmen" and that people can obey different supreme authorities if there are more than one claims to the highest authority.

Berkeley defends this thesis with deductive proof stemming from the laws of nature. First, he establishes that because God is perfectly good, the end to which he commands humans must also be good, and that end must not benefit just one person, but the entire human race. Because these commands—or laws—if practised, would lead to the general fitness of humankind, it follows that they can be discovered by the right reason—for example, the law to never resist supreme power can be derived from reason because this law is "the only thing that stands between us and total disorder". Thus, these laws can be called the laws of nature, because they are derived from God—the creator of nature himself. "These laws of nature include duties never to resist the supreme power, lie under oath ... or do evil so that good may come of it."

One may view Berkeley's doctrine on Passive Obedience as a kind of 'Theological Utilitarianism', insofar as it states that we have a duty to uphold a moral code which presumably is working towards the ends of promoting the good of humankind. However, the concept of 'ordinary' utilitarianism is fundamentally different in that it "makes utility the one and only ground of obligation"—that is, Utilitarianism is concerned with whether particular actions are morally permissible in specific situations, while Berkeley's doctrine is concerned with whether or not we should follow moral rules in any and all circumstances. Whereas act utilitarianism might, for example, justify a morally impermissible act in light of the specific situation, Berkeley's doctrine of Passive Obedience holds that it is never morally permissible to not follow a moral rule, even when it seems like breaking that moral rule might achieve the happiest ends. Berkeley holds that even though sometimes, the consequences of an action in a specific situation might be bad, the general tendencies of that action benefit humanity.

Other important sources for Berkeley's views on morality are Alciphron (1732), especially dialogues I–III, and the Discourse to Magistrates (1738)." Passive Obedience is notable partly for containing one of the earliest statements of rule utilitarianism.

=== Immaterialism ===
George Berkeley’s theory that matter does not exist comes from the belief that "sensible things are those only which are immediately perceived by sense." Berkeley says in his book called Principles of Human Knowledge that "the ideas of sense are stronger, livelier, and clearer than those of the imagination; and they are also steady, orderly and coherent." From this we can tell that the things that we are perceiving are truly real rather than it just being a dream.

All knowledge comes from perception; what we perceive are ideas, not things in themselves; a thing in itself must be outside experience; so the world only consists of ideas and minds that perceive those ideas; a thing only exists so far as it perceives or is perceived. Through this we can see that consciousness is considered something that exists to Berkeley due to its ability to perceive. "'To be,' said of the object, means to be perceived, 'esse est percipi'; 'to be', said of the subject, means to perceive or 'percipere'." Having established this, Berkeley then attacks the "opinion strangely prevailing amongst men, that houses, mountains, rivers, and in a word all sensible objects have an existence natural or real, distinct from being perceived". He believes this idea to be inconsistent because such an object with an existence independent of perception must have both sensible qualities, and thus be known (making it an idea), and also an insensible reality, which Berkeley believes is inconsistent. Berkeley believes that the error arises because people think that perceptions can imply or infer something about the material object. Berkeley calls this concept abstract ideas. He rebuts this concept by arguing that people cannot conceive of an object without also imagining the sensual input of the object. He argues in Principles of Human Knowledge that, similar to how people can only sense matter with their senses through the actual sensation, they can only conceive of matter (or, rather, ideas of matter) through the idea of sensation of matter. This implies that everything that people can conceive in regards to matter is only ideas about matter. Thus, matter, should it exist, must exist as collections of ideas, which can be perceived by the senses and interpreted by the mind. But if matter is just a collection of ideas, then Berkeley concludes that matter, in the sense of a material substance, does not exist as most philosophers of Berkeley's time believed. Indeed, if a person visualizes something, then it must have some colour, however dark or light; it cannot just be a shape of no colour at all if a person is to visualize it.

Berkeley's ideas raised controversy because his argument refuted Descartes' philosophy, which was expanded upon by Locke, and resulted in the rejection of Berkeley's form of empiricism by several philosophers of the eighteenth century. In Locke's philosophy, "the world causes the perceptual ideas we have of it by the way it interacts with our senses." This contradicts with Berkeley's philosophy because not only does it suggest the existence of physical causes in the world, but in fact, there is no physical world beyond our ideas. The only causes that exist in Berkeley's philosophy are those that are a result of the use of the will.

Berkeley's theory relies heavily on his form of empiricism, which in turn relies heavily on the senses. His empiricism can be defined by five propositions: all significant words stand for ideas; all knowledge of things is about ideas; all ideas come from without or from within; if from without it must be by the senses, and they are called sensations (the real things), if from within they are the operations of the mind, and are called thoughts. Berkeley clarifies his distinction between ideas by saying they "are imprinted on the senses," "perceived by attending to the passions and operations of the mind," or "are formed by help of memory and imagination." One refutation of his idea was: if someone leaves a room and stops perceiving that room does that room no longer exist? Berkeley answers this by claiming that it is still being perceived and the consciousness that is doing the perceiving is God. (This makes Berkeley's argument hinge upon an omniscient, omnipresent deity.) This claim is the only thing holding up his argument which is "depending for our knowledge of the world, and of the existence of other minds, upon a God that would never deceive us." Berkeley anticipates a second objection, which he refutes in Principles of Human Knowledge. He anticipates that the materialist may take a representational materialist standpoint: although the senses can only perceive ideas, these ideas resemble (and thus can be compared to) the actual, existing object. Thus, through the sensing of these ideas, the mind can make inferences as to matter itself, even though pure matter is non-perceivable. Berkeley's objection to that notion is that "an idea can be like nothing but an idea; a colour or figure can be like nothing but another colour or figure". Berkeley distinguishes between an idea, which is mind-dependent, and a material substance, which is not an idea and is mind-independent. As they are not alike, they cannot be compared, just as one cannot compare the colour red to something that is invisible, or the sound of music to silence, other than that one exists and the other does not. This is called the likeness principle: the notion that an idea can only be like (and thus compared to) another idea.

Berkeley attempted to show how ideas manifest themselves into different objects of knowledge:

It is evident to anyone who takes a survey of the objects of human knowledge, that they are either ideas actually imprinted on the senses; or else such as are perceived by attending to the passions and operations of the mind; or lastly ideas formed by help of memory and imagination—either compounding, dividing, or barely representing those originally perceived in the aforesaid ways". (Berkeley's emphasis.)

Berkeley also attempted to prove the existence of God throughout his beliefs in immaterialism.

== Influence ==
Berkeley's Treatise Concerning the Principles of Human Knowledge was published three years before the publication of Arthur Collier's Clavis Universalis, which made assertions similar to those of Berkeley's. However, there seemed to have been no influence or communication between the two writers.

German philosopher Arthur Schopenhauer once wrote of him: "Berkeley was, therefore, the first to treat the subjective starting-point really seriously and to demonstrate irrefutably its absolute necessity. He is the father of idealism...".

Berkeley is considered one of the originators of British empiricism. A linear development is often traced from three great "British Empiricists", leading from Locke through Berkeley to Hume.

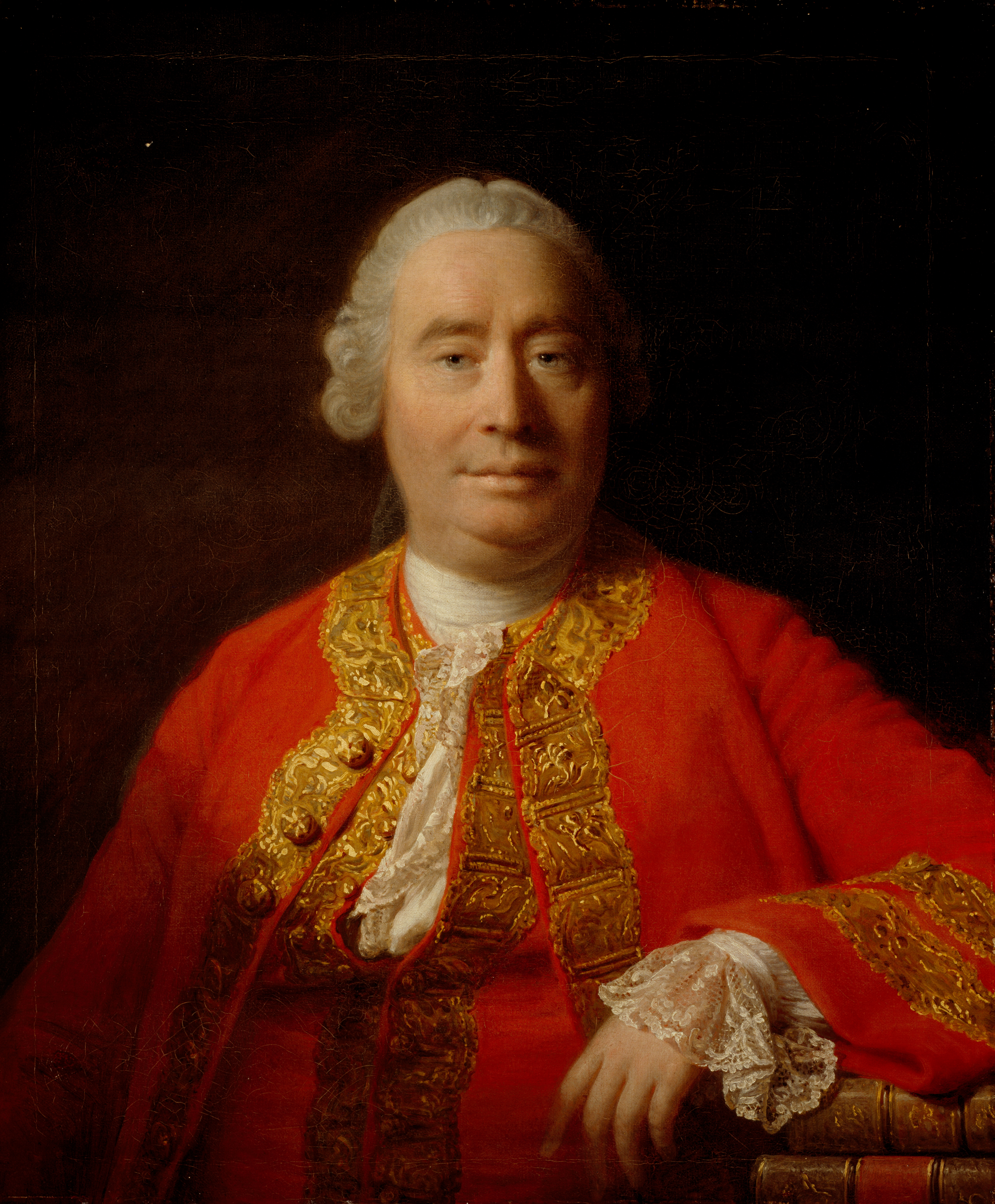
David Hume, whom Berkeley influenced

Berkeley influenced many modern philosophers, especially David Hume. Thomas Reid admitted that he put forward a drastic criticism of Berkeleianism after he had been an admirer of Berkeley's philosophical system for a long time. Berkeley's "thought made possible the work of Hume and thus Kant, notes Alfred North Whitehead". Some authors draw a parallel between Berkeley and Edmund Husserl.

When Berkeley visited America, the American educator Samuel Johnson visited him, and the two later corresponded. Johnson convinced Berkeley to establish a scholarship program at Yale and to donate a large number of books, as well as his plantation, to the college when the philosopher returned to England. It was one of Yale's largest and most important donations; it doubled its library holdings, improved the college's financial position and brought Anglican religious ideas and English culture into New England. Johnson also took Berkeley's philosophy and used parts of it as a framework for his own American Practical Idealism school of philosophy. As Johnson's philosophy was taught to about half the graduates of American colleges between 1743 and 1776, and over half of the contributors to the Declaration of Independence were connected to it, Berkeley's ideas were indirectly a foundation of the American Mind.

Outside of America, during Berkeley's lifetime, his philosophical ideas were comparatively uninfluential. But interest in his doctrine grew from the 1870s when Alexander Campbell Fraser, "the leading Berkeley scholar of the nineteenth century", published The Works of George Berkeley. A powerful impulse to serious studies in Berkeley's philosophy was given by A. A. Luce and Thomas Edmund Jessop, "two of the twentieth century's foremost Berkeley scholars", thanks to whom Berkeley scholarship was raised to the rank of a special area of historico-philosophical science. In addition, the philosopher Colin Murray Turbayne wrote extensively on Berkeley's use of language as a model for visual, physiological, natural and metaphysical relationships.

The proportion of Berkeley scholarship, in literature on the history of philosophy, is increasing. This can be judged from the most comprehensive bibliographies on George Berkeley. During the period of 1709–1932, about 300 writings on Berkeley were published. That amounted to 1.5 publications per year. During the course of 1932–1979, over one thousand works were brought out, i.e., 20 works per year. Since then, the number of publications has reached 30 per annum. In 1977 publication began in Ireland of a special journal on Berkeley's life and thought (Berkeley Studies). In 1988, the Australian philosopher Colin Murray Turbayne established the International Berkeley Essay Prize Competition at the University of Rochester in an effort to advance scholarship and research on the works of Berkeley.

Other than philosophy, Berkeley also influenced modern psychology with his work on John Locke's theory of association and how it could be used to explain how humans gain knowledge in the physical world. He also used the theory to explain perception, stating that all qualities were, as Locke would call them, "secondary qualities", therefore perception laid entirely in the perceiver and not in the object. These are both topics today studied in modern psychology.

== Appearances in literature ==
Lord Byron's Don Juan references immaterialism in the Eleventh Canto:

When Bishop Berkeley said 'there was no matter,'
And proved it—'t was no matter what he said:
They say his system 't is in vain to batter,
Too subtle for the airiest human head;
And yet who can believe it? I would shatter
Gladly all matters down to stone or lead,
Or adamant, to find the world a spirit,
And wear my head, denying that I wear it.

Herman Melville humorously references Berkeley in Chapter 20 of Mardi (1849), when outlining a character's belief of being on board a ghostship:

And here be it said, that for all his superstitious misgivings about the brigantine; his imputing to her something equivalent to a purely phantom-like nature, honest Jarl was nevertheless exceedingly downright and practical in all hints and proceedings concerning her. Wherein, he resembled my Right Reverend friend, Bishop Berkeley–truly, one of your lords spiritual—who, metaphysically speaking, holding all objects to be mere optical delusions, was, notwithstanding, extremely matter-of-fact in all matters touching matter itself. Besides being pervious to the points of pins, and possessing a palate capable of appreciating plum-puddings:—which sentence reads off like a pattering of hailstones.

James Joyce references Berkeley's philosophy in the third episode of Ulysses (1922):

Who watches me here? Who ever anywhere will read these written words? Signs on a white field. Somewhere to someone in your flutiest voice. The good bishop of Cloyne took the veil of the temple out of his shovel hat: veil of space with coloured emblems hatched on its field. Hold hard. Coloured on a flat: yes, that's right. Flat I see, then think distance, near, far, flat I see, east, back. Ah, see now!

In commenting on a review of Ada or Ardor, author Vladimir Nabokov alludes to Berkeley's philosophy as informing his novel:

And finally I owe no debt whatsoever (as Mr. Leonard seems to think) to the famous Argentine essayist and his rather confused compilation "A New Refutation of Time." Mr. Leonard would have lost less of it had he gone straight to Berkeley and Bergson. (Strong Opinions, pp. 2892–90)

James Boswell, in the part of his Life of Samuel Johnson covering the year 1763, recorded Johnson's opinion of one aspect of Berkeley's philosophy:

After we came out of the church, we stood talking for some time together of Bishop Berkeley's ingenious sophistry to prove the non-existence of matter, and that every thing in the universe is merely ideal. I observed, that though we are satisfied his doctrine is untrue, it is impossible to refute it. I shall never forget the alacrity with which Johnson answered, striking his foot with mighty force against a large stone, till he rebounded from it,– "I refute it thus."

== Commemoration ==
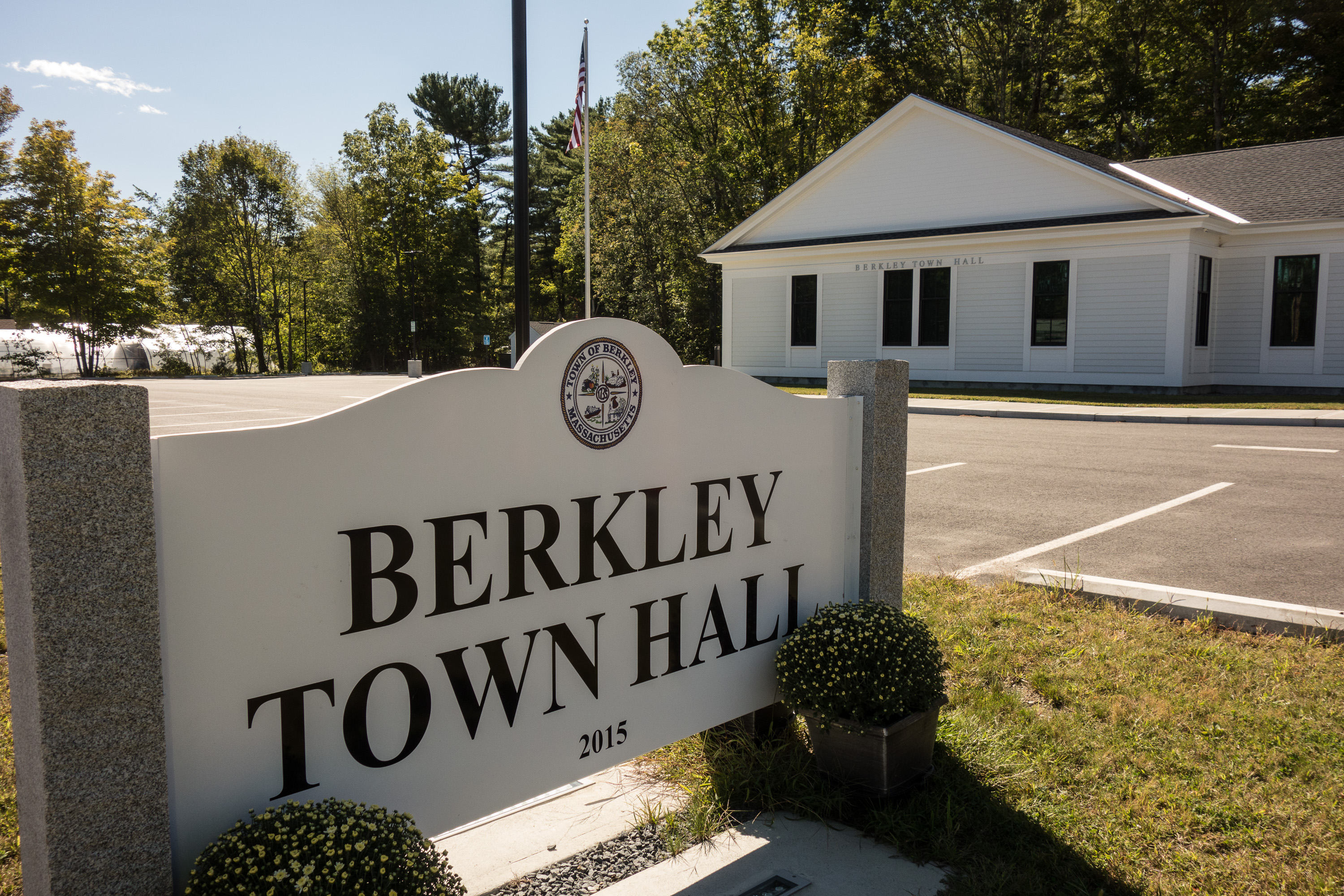
Berkley, Massachusetts Town Hall

Both the University of California, Berkeley, and the city of Berkeley, California, were named after him, although both school and city are pronounced (/ˈbɜːrkli/ BURK-lee). The naming was suggested in 1866 by Frederick H. Billings, a trustee of what was then called the College of California. Billings was inspired by Berkeley's Verses on the Prospect of Planting Arts and Learning in America, particularly the final stanza: "Westward the course of empire takes its way; the first four Acts already past, a fifth shall close the Drama with the day; time's noblest offspring is the last".

The Town of Berkley, currently the least populated town in Bristol County, Massachusetts, was founded on 18 April 1735 and named for George Berkeley.

A residential college and an Episcopal seminary at Yale University also bear Berkeley's name.

"Bishop Berkeley's Gold Medals" were two awards given annually at Trinity College Dublin, "provided outstanding merit is shown", to candidates answering a special examination in Greek. The awards were founded in 1752 by Berkeley. However, they have not been awarded since 2011. Other elements of Berkeley's legacy at Trinity are currently under review (As of 2023) due to his support of slavery. For example, the library at Trinity that was named after him in 1978 was "de-named" in April 2023 and renamed in October 2024 after Irish poet Eavan Boland. Another memorialization of him in the form of a stained glass window will remain, but used as part of "a retain-and-explain approach" where his legacy will be given further context.

An Ulster History Circle blue plaque commemorating him is located in Bishop Street Within, the city of Derry.

Berkeley's farmhouse in Middletown, Rhode Island, is preserved as Whitehall Museum House, also known as Berkeley House, and was listed on the National Register of Historic Places in 1970. St. Columba's Chapel, located in the same town, was formerly named "The Berkeley Memorial Chapel", and the appellation still survives at the end of the formal name of the parish, "St. Columba's, the Berkeley Memorial Chapel".

== Writings ==
=== Original publications ===
- Arithmetica (1707)
- Miscellanea Mathematica (1707)
- Philosophical Commentaries or Common-Place Book (1707–08, notebooks)
- An Essay Towards a New Theory of Vision (1709)
- A Treatise Concerning the Principles of Human Knowledge, Part I (1710)
- Passive Obedience, or the Christian doctrine of not resisting the Supreme Power (1712)
- Three Dialogues Between Hylas and Philonous (1713)
- An Essay Towards Preventing the Ruin of Great Britain (1721)
- De Motu (1721)
- A Proposal for Better Supplying Churches in our Foreign Plantations, and for converting the Savage Americans to Christianity by a College to be erected in the Summer Islands (1725)
- A Sermon preached before the incorporated Society for the Propagation of the Gospel in Foreign Parts (1732)
- Alciphron, or the Minute Philosopher (1732)
- Essays toward a new theory of vision (in Italian). Venezia: Francesco Storti (2.). 1732.
- The Theory of Vision, or Visual Language, shewing the immediate presence and providence of a Deity, vindicated and explained (1733)
- The Analyst: A Discourse Addressed to an Infidel Mathematician (1734)
- A Defence of Free-thinking in Mathematics, with Appendix concerning Mr. Walton's vindication of Sir Isaac Newton's Principle of Fluxions (1735)
- Reasons for not replying to Mr. Walton's Full Answer (1735)
- The Querist, containing several queries proposed to the consideration of the public (three parts, 1735–37).
- A Discourse addressed to Magistrates and Men of Authority (1736)
- Siris: A Chain of Philosophical Reflections and Inquiries, Concerning the Virtues of Tar Water (1744).
- A Letter to the Roman Catholics of the Diocese of Cloyne (1745)
- A Word to the Wise, or an exhortation to the Roman Catholic clergy of Ireland (1749)
- Maxims concerning Patriotism (1750)
- Farther Thoughts on Tar-water (1752)
- Miscellany (1752)

=== Collections ===
- The Works of George Berkeley, D.D. Late Bishop of Cloyne in Ireland. To which is added, an account of his life, and several of his letters to Thomas Prior, Esq. Dean Gervais, and Mr. Pope, &c. &c. Printed for George Robinson, Pater Noster Row, 1784. Two volumes.
- The Works of George Berkeley, D.D., formerly Bishop of Cloyne: Including Many of His Writings Hitherto Unpublished; With Prefaces, Annotations, His Life and Letters, and an Account of His Philosophy. Ed. by Alexander Campbell Fraser. In 4 Volumes. Oxford: Clarendon Press, 1901.
  - Vol. 1
  - Vol. 2
  - Vol. 3
  - Vol. 4
- The Works of George Berkeley. Ed. by A. A. Luce and T. E. Jessop. Nine volumes. Edinburgh and London, 1948–1957.
- Ewald, William B., ed., 1996. From Kant to Hilbert: A Source Book in the Foundations of Mathematics, 2 vols. Oxford Uni. Press.
  - 1707. Of Infinites, 16–19.
  - 1709. Letter to Samuel Molyneaux, 19–21.
  - 1721. De Motu, 37–54.
  - 1734. The Analyst, 60–92.

== See also ==
- List of people on the postage stamps of Ireland
- Solipsism
- "Tlön, Uqbar, Orbis Tertius"
- Yogacara and consciousness-only schools of thought

== Sources ==
=== Bibliographic resources ===
- Jessop T. E., Luce A. A. A bibliography of George Berkeley 2 edn., Springer, 1973. ISBN 978-90-247-1577-0
- Turbayne C. M. A Bibliography of George Berkeley 1963–1979 in: Berkeley: Critical and Interpretive Essays – via Google Books, Manchester, 1982. pp. 313–29.
- Berkeley Bibliography (1979–2010) – A Supplement to those of Jessop and Turbayne by Silvia Parigi.
- A Bibliography on George Berkeley – About 300 works from the 19th century to our days.

=== Philosophical studies ===
- Daniel, Stephen H. (ed.), Re-examining Berkeley's Philosophy, Toronto: University of Toronto Press, 2007.
- Daniel, Stephen H. (ed.), New Interpretations of Berkeley's Thought, Amherst: Humanity Books, 2008.
- Dicker, Georges, Berkeley's Idealism. A Critical Examination, Cambridge: Cambridge University Press, 2011.
- Gaustad, Edwin. George Berkeley in America. New Haven: Yale University Press, 1959.
- Pappas, George S., Berkeley's Thought, Ithaca: Cornell University Press, 2000.
- Stoneham, Tom, Berkeley's World: An Examination of the Three Dialogues, Oxford University Press, 2002.
- Warnock, Geoffrey J., Berkeley, Penguin Books, 1953.
- Winkler, Kenneth P., The Cambridge Companion to Berkeley, Cambridge: Cambridge University Press, 2005.

Attribution
