= List of Clarkson Golden Knights men's ice hockey seasons =

This is a season-by-season list of records compiled by Clarkson in men's ice hockey.

Clarkson University has made twenty-two appearances in the NCAA Tournament, making the Frozen Four seven times and the championship game three times.

Clarkson completed an undefeated season in 1956, however, because eight members of the team were 4-year seniors and would have been ineligible to play in the tournament Clarkson declined the invitation.

== Season-by-season results ==
Note: GP = Games played, W = Wins, L = Losses, T = Ties

NCAA D-I Champions	NCAA Frozen Four	Conference regular season champions	Conference Playoff Champions

Season	Conference	Regular Season (Note: Code explanation; GP—Games Played, W—Wins, L—Losses, T—Tied games, OTW—Overtime Wins, OTL—Overtime Loses, 3/SW—Win in 3 on 3 overtime or shootout, Pts—Points*)														Conference Tournament Results	National Tournament Results
Season	Conference	Conference									Overall					Conference Tournament Results	National Tournament Results
Season	Conference	GP	W	L	T	OTW	OTL	3/SW	Pts*	Finish	GP	W	L	T	%	Conference Tournament Results	National Tournament Results
Gordon Croskery (1920 — 1929)
1920–21	Independent	–	–	–	–	–	–	–	–	–	3	2	1	0	.667		
1921–22	Independent	–	–	–	–	–	–	–	–	–	3	1	2	0	.333		
1922–23	Independent	–	–	–	–	–	–	–	–	–	6	3	2	1	.583		
1923–24	Independent	–	–	–	–	–	–	–	–	–	7	3	4	0	.429		
1924–25	Independent	–	–	–	–	–	–	–	–	–	6	0	6	0	.000		
1925–26	Independent	–	–	–	–	–	–	–	–	–	8	4	4	0	.500		
1926–27	Independent	–	–	–	–	–	–	–	–	–	9	8	1	0	.889		
1927–28	Independent	–	–	–	–	–	–	–	–	–	11	10	1	0	.909		
1928–29	Independent	–	–	–	–	–	–	–	–	–	11	10	1	0	.909		
Jack Roos (1929 — 1944)
1929–30	Independent	–	–	–	–	–	–	–	–	–	10	8	2	0	.800		
1930–31	Independent	–	–	–	–	–	–	–	–	–	12	11	1	0	.917		
1931–32	Independent	–	–	–	–	–	–	–	–	–	11	7	4	0	.636		
1932–33	Independent	–	–	–	–	–	–	–	–	–	11	6	5	0	.545		
1933–34	Independent	–	–	–	–	–	–	–	–	–	10	6	4	0	.600		
1934–35	Independent	–	–	–	–	–	–	–	–	–	13	10	3	0	.769		
1935–36	Independent	–	–	–	–	–	–	–	–	–	16	13	2	1	.867		
1936–37	Independent	–	–	–	–	–	–	–	–	–	9	6	3	0	.667		
1937–38	Independent	–	–	–	–	–	–	–	–	–	15	13	1	1	.900		
1938–39	Independent	–	–	–	–	–	–	–	–	–	22	8	12	2	.409		
1939–40	Independent	–	–	–	–	–	–	–	–	–	19	10	8	1	.553		
1940–41	Independent	–	–	–	–	–	–	–	–	–	13	10	3	0	.769		
1941–42	Independent	–	–	–	–	–	–	–	–	–	14	8	6	0	.571		
1942–43	Independent	–	–	–	–	–	–	–	–	–	8	3	5	0	.375		
1943–44	Independent	–	–	–	–	–	–	–	–	–	7	0	7	0	.000		
Program suspended due to World War II
Jack Roos (1946 — 1948)
1946–47	Independent	–	–	–	–	–	–	–	–	–	15	7	7	1	.500		
1947–48	Independent	–	–	–	–	–	–	–	–	–	17	10	6	1	.618		
Bill Harrison (1948 — 1958)
1948–49	Independent	–	–	–	–	–	–	–	–	–	13	8	5	0	.571		
1949–50	Independent	–	–	–	–	–	–	–	–	–	14	4	8	2	.357		
1950–51	Tri-State League	5	4	1	0	–	–	–	8	T–1st	15	12	2	1	.833		
1951–52	Tri-State League	6	3	3	0	–	–	–	6	3rd	15	10	5	0	.667		
1952–53	Tri-State League	5	1	3	1	–	–	–	3	3rd	19	9	9	1	.500		
1953–54	Tri-State League	5	1	4	0	–	–	–	4	3rd	17	7	8	2	.471		
1954–55	Tri-State League	6	4	2	0	–	–	–	8	2nd	22	18	4	0	.818		
1955–56	Tri-State League	6	6	0	0	–	–	–	12	1st	23	23	0	0	1.000		
1956–57	Tri-State League	6	4	2	0	–	–	–	8	2nd	22	19	3	0	.864		Lost Semifinal, 3–5 (Colorado College); Won Consolation Game, 2–1 (Harvard)
1957–58	Tri-State League	5	5	0	0	–	–	–	12	1st	20	17	3	0	.850		Lost Semifinal, 2–6 (Denver); Won Consolation Game, 5–1 (Harvard)
Len Ceglarski (1958 — 1972)
1958–59	Tri-State League	5	2	3	0	–	–	–	6	T–2nd	19	10	8	1	.553		
1959–60	Tri-State League	4	0	4	0	–	–	–	0	3rd	20	7	13	0	.350		
1960–61	Tri-State League	4	1	3	0	–	–	–	2	3rd	22	14	8	0	.636		
1961–62	ECAC Hockey	15	13	1	1	–	–	–	.900	T–2nd	26	22	3	1	.865	Won Quarterfinal, 6–3 (Providence); Won Semifinal, 4–1 (Colby); Lost Championship, 2–5 (St. Lawrence)	Won Semifinal, 5–4 (Michigan); Lost Championship, 1–7 (Michigan Tech)
1961–62	Tri-State League†	4	3	0	1	–	–	–	7	1st	26	22	3	1	.865	Won Quarterfinal, 6–3 (Providence); Won Semifinal, 4–1 (Colby); Lost Championship, 2–5 (St. Lawrence)	Won Semifinal, 5–4 (Michigan); Lost Championship, 1–7 (Michigan Tech)
1962–63	ECAC Hockey	15	11	2	2	–	–	–	.800	2nd	28	21	5	2	.786	Won Quarterfinal, 3–1 (Brown); Lost Semifinal, 4–6 (Harvard); Won Third-place game, 7–5 (St. Lawrence)	Lost Semifinal, 2–6 (Denver); Won Consolation Game, 5–3 (Boston College)
1962–63	Tri-State League†	4	2	1	1	–	–	–	5	2nd	28	21	5	2	.786	Won Quarterfinal, 3–1 (Brown); Lost Semifinal, 4–6 (Harvard); Won Third-place game, 7–5 (St. Lawrence)	Lost Semifinal, 2–6 (Denver); Won Consolation Game, 5–3 (Boston College)
1963–64	ECAC Hockey	16	10	5	1	–	–	–	.656	8th	25	17	7	1	.700	Won Quarterfinal, 6–4 (Harvard); Lost Semifinal, 5–6 (Providence); Lost Third-place game, 4–6 (Rensselaer)	
1963–64	Tri-State League†	4	2	1	1	–	–	–	5	T–1st	25	17	7	1	.700	Won Quarterfinal, 6–4 (Harvard); Lost Semifinal, 5–6 (Providence); Lost Third-place game, 4–6 (Rensselaer)	
University Division
1964–65	ECAC Hockey	15	11	4	0	–	–	–	.733	3rd	25	18	7	0	.720	Won Quarterfinal, 6–3 (Northeastern); Lost Semifinal, 2–3 (Boston College); Lost Third-place game, 0–4 (Boston University)	
1964–65	ICAC†	4	4	0	0	–	–	–	8	1st	25	18	7	0	.720	Won Quarterfinal, 6–3 (Northeastern); Lost Semifinal, 2–3 (Boston College); Lost Third-place game, 0–4 (Boston University)	
1965–66	ECAC Hockey	12	11	1	0	–	–	–	.917	1st	27	24	3	0	.889	Won Quarterfinal, 5–2 (Colgate); Won Semifinal, 2–1 (Brown); Won Championship, 6–2 (Cornell)	Won Semifinal, 4–3 (Denver); Lost Championship, 1–6 (Michigan State)
1965–66	ICAC†	4	4	0	0	–	–	–	8	1st	27	24	3	0	.889	Won Quarterfinal, 5–2 (Colgate); Won Semifinal, 2–1 (Brown); Won Championship, 6–2 (Cornell)	Won Semifinal, 4–3 (Denver); Lost Championship, 1–6 (Michigan State)
1966–67	ECAC Hockey	15	8	6	1	–	–	–	.567	6th	23	14	8	1	.630	Lost Quarterfinal, 2–9 (Boston College)	
1966–67	ICAC†	4	2	1	1	–	–	–	5	2nd	23	14	8	1	.630	Lost Quarterfinal, 2–9 (Boston College)	
1967–68	ECAC Hockey	16	11	5	0	–	–	–	.688	2nd	24	16	7	1	.688	Won Quarterfinal, 7–3 (Brown); Lost Semifinal, 5–6 (Boston College); Won Third-place game, 4–1 (Boston University)	
1967–68	ICAC†	4	3	1	0	–	–	–	8	1st	24	16	7	1	.688	Won Quarterfinal, 7–3 (Brown); Lost Semifinal, 5–6 (Boston College); Won Third-place game, 4–1 (Boston University)	
1968–69	ECAC Hockey	18	12	5	1	–	–	–	.694	4th	28	19	7	2	.714	Won Quarterfinal, 4–2 (Boston College); Lost Semifinal, 6–8 (Harvard); Lost Third-place game, 0–5 (Boston University)	
1968–69	ICAC†	4	2	2	0	–	–	–	4	2nd	28	19	7	2	.714	Won Quarterfinal, 4–2 (Boston College); Lost Semifinal, 6–8 (Harvard); Lost Third-place game, 0–5 (Boston University)	
1969–70	ECAC Hockey	17	14	3	0	–	–	–	.824	2nd	32	24	8	0	.750	Won Quarterfinal, 6–5 (Brown); Won Semifinal, 5–4 (Boston University); Lost Championship, 2–3 (Cornell)	Won Semifinal, 4–3 (Michigan Tech); Lost Championship, 4–6 (Cornell)
1969–70	ICAC†	4	4	0	0	–	–	–	8	1st	32	24	8	0	.750	Won Quarterfinal, 6–5 (Brown); Won Semifinal, 5–4 (Boston University); Lost Championship, 2–3 (Cornell)	Won Semifinal, 4–3 (Michigan Tech); Lost Championship, 4–6 (Cornell)
1970–71	ECAC Hockey	19	16	2	1	–	–	–	.868	2nd	33	28	4	1	.864	Won Quarterfinal, 5–2 (Pennsylvania); Won Semifinal, 4–1 (Cornell); Lost Championship, 4–7 (Harvard)	
1970–71	ICAC†	4	3	0	1	–	–	–	7	1st	33	28	4	1	.864	Won Quarterfinal, 5–2 (Pennsylvania); Won Semifinal, 4–1 (Cornell); Lost Championship, 4–7 (Harvard)	
1971–72	ECAC Hockey	20	12	8	0	–	–	–	.600	6th	30	20	10	0	.667	Lost Quarterfinal, 5–6 (Harvard)	
1971–72	ICAC†	4	2	2	0	–	–	–	4	2nd	30	20	10	0	.667	Lost Quarterfinal, 5–6 (Harvard)	
Jerry York (1972 — 1979)
1972–73	ECAC Hockey	20	11	9	0	–	–	–	.550	T–6th	33	18	15	0	.545	Won Quarterfinal, 7–4 (Harvard); Lost Semifinal, 4–9 (Cornell); Won Third-place game, 4–0 (Pennsylvania)	
Division I
1973–74	ECAC Hockey	21	9	11	1	–	–	–	.452	9th	27	12	14	1	.463		
1974–75	ECAC Hockey	19	9	9	1	–	–	–	.500	8th	29	13	15	1	.466	Lost Quarterfinal, 5–10 (Harvard)	
1975–76	ECAC Hockey	25	16	8	1	–	–	–	.660	4th	31	18	12	1	.597	Lost Quarterfinal, 7–9 (Cornell)	
1976–77	ECAC Hockey	23	19	4	0	–	–	–	.826	1st	34	26	8	0	.765	Won Quarterfinal, 6–3 (Providence); Lost Semifinal, 6–7 (Boston University); Lost Third-place game, 4–5 (Cornell)	
1977–78	ECAC Hockey	23	16	7	0	–	–	–	.696	3rd	30	19	11	0	.633	Lost Quarterfinal, 2–6 (Brown)	
1978–79	ECAC Hockey	22	13	9	0	–	–	–	.591	5th	31	19	12	0	.613	Lost Quarterfinal, 1–2 (Dartmouth)	
Bill O'Flaherty (1979 — 1985)
1979–80	ECAC Hockey	21	14	7	0	–	–	–	.667	5th	34	21	12	1	.632	Won Quarterfinal, 8–3 (Vermont); Lost Semifinal, 4–6 (Dartmouth); Lost Third-place game, 5–6 (Providence)	
1980–81	ECAC Hockey	20	17	2	1	–	–	–	.875	1st	37	26	7	4	.757	Won Quarterfinal, 4–3 (New Hampshire); Lost Semifinal, 3–4 (Providence); Tied Third-place game, 3–3 (Colgate)	Lost Quarterfinal series, 8–9 (Wisconsin)
1981–82	ECAC Hockey	20	15	4	1	–	–	–	.775	1st	35	26	8	1	.757	Won Quarterfinal, 7–4 (Colgate); Lost Semifinal, 1–7 (Harvard); Lost Third-place game, 5–6 (New Hampshire)	Lost Quarterfinal series, 2–7 (North Dakota)
1982–83	ECAC Hockey	20	13	6	1	–	–	–	.675	5th	31	19	11	1	.629	Lost Quarterfinal series, 1–2 (St. Lawrence)	
1983–84	ECAC Hockey	20	14	6	0	–	–	–	.700	4th	34	21	11	2	.647	Won Quarterfinal series, 1–0–1 (Harvard); Lost Semifinal, 1–5 (Rensselaer); Won Third-place game, 3–1 (Boston College)	Lost Quarterfinal series, 8–9 (Minnesota–Duluth)
1984–85	ECAC Hockey	21	15	6	0	–	–	–	30	3rd	34	21	10	3	.662	Won Quarterfinal series, 1–0–1 (St. Lawrence); Lost Semifinal, 1–2 (Harvard); Lost Third-place game, 3–5 (Cornell)	
Cap Raeder (1985 — 1988)
1985–86	ECAC Hockey	21	12	6	3	–	–	–	27	T–4th	32	18	11	3	.609	Won Quarterfinal series, 2–0 (Rensselaer); Won Semifinal, 4–2 (Harvard); Lost Championship, 2–3 (Cornell)	
1986–87	ECAC Hockey	22	12	10	0	–	–	–	24	5th	31	17	13	1	.565	Lost Quarterfinal series, 0–1–1 (Yale)	
1987–88	ECAC Hockey	22	10	9	3	–	–	–	23	T–6th	35	17	15	3	.529	Won Quarterfinal series, 2–1 (Cornell); Won Semifinal, 6–4 (Harvard); Lost Championship, 0–3 (St. Lawrence)	
Mark Morris (1988 — 2002)
1988–89	ECAC Hockey	22	13	7	2	–	–	–	28	4th	32	16	13	3	.547	Lost Quarterfinal series, 0–1–1 (Cornell)	
1989–90	ECAC Hockey	22	12	7	3	–	–	–	27	T–3rd	35	21	11	3	.643	Won Quarterfinal series, 2–0 (St. Lawrence); Lost Semifinal, 3–5 (Colgate)	Lost First Round series, 0–2 (Minnesota)
1990–91	ECAC Hockey	22	15	5	2	–	–	–	32	1st	40	29	9	2	.750	Won Quarterfinal series, 2–0 (Yale); Won Semifinal, 3–2 (Harvard); Won Championship, 5–4 (St. Lawrence)	Won First Round series, 2–0 (Wisconsin); Won Quarterfinal series, 2–1 (Lake Superior State); Lost Semifinal, 3–7 (Boston University)
1991–92	ECAC Hockey	22	15	6	1	–	–	–	32	T–2nd	33	22	10	1	.682	Won Quarterfinal, 8–3 (Brown); Lost Semifinal, 3–4 (Cornell)	Lost Regional Quarterfinal, 4–8 (Northern Michigan)
1992–93	ECAC Hockey	22	12	6	4	–	–	–	28	T–3rd	35	20	10	5	.643	Won Quarterfinal series, 2–0 (St. Lawrence); Won Semifinal, 5–3 (Rensselaer); Won Championship, 3–1 (Brown)	Lost Regional Quarterfinal, 1–2 (Minnesota)
1993–94	ECAC Hockey	22	13	5	4	–	–	–	30	2nd	34	20	9	5	.662	Won Quarterfinal series, 2–0 (Colgate); Lost Semifinal, 2–6 (Rensselaer); Won Third-place game, 6–2 (Brown)	
1994–95	ECAC Hockey	22	14	5	3	–	–	–	31	1st	37	23	10	4	.658	Won Quarterfinal series, 2–0 (Cornell); Lost Semifinal, 1–2 (Princeton); Won Third-place game, 10–5 (Colgate)	Lost Regional Quarterfinal, 4–5 (Lake Superior State)
1995–96	ECAC Hockey	22	16	4	2	–	–	–	34	2nd	38	25	10	3	.697	Won Quarterfinal series, 2–0 (Brown); Lost Semifinal, 0–3 (Cornell); Lost Third-place game, 1–3 (Vermont)	Won Regional Quarterfinal, 6–1 (Western Michigan); Lost regional semifinal, 2–3 (Boston University)
1996–97	ECAC Hockey	22	17	5	0	–	–	–	34	1st	37	27	10	0	.730	Won Quarterfinal series, 2–0 (Yale); Won Semifinal, 5–1 (Princeton); Lost Championship, 1–2 (Cornell)	Lost Regional Semifinal, 4–5 (Colorado College)
1997–98	ECAC Hockey	22	16	4	2	–	–	–	34	2nd	35	23	9	3	.700	Won First Round series, 2–0 (Vermont); Won Semifinal, 6–2 (Harvard); Lost Championship, 4–5 (Princeton)	Lost Regional Quarterfinal, 1–3 (Colorado College)
1998–99	ECAC Hockey	22	18	4	0	–	–	–	36	1st	37	25	11	1	.689	Won First Round series, 2–0 (Brown); Won Semifinal, 6–5 (Princeton); Won Championship, 3–2 (St. Lawrence)	Lost Regional Semifinal, 2–7 (Maine)
1999–00	ECAC Hockey	20	9	8	3	–	–	–	21	T–4th	35	17	15	3	.529	Won First Round series, 2–0 (Princeton); Lost Four vs. Five, 2–4 (Cornell)	
2000–01	ECAC Hockey	22	15	5	2	–	–	–	32	1st	35	21	11	3	.643	Lost First Round series, 1–2 (Vermont)	
2001–02	ECAC Hockey	22	11	6	5	–	–	–	27	2nd	38	17	15	6	.526	Won First Round series, 2–0 (St. Lawrence); Lost Semifinal, 2–3 (Harvard); Lost Third-place game, 3–4 (Rensselaer)	
Fred Parker‡ (2002 — 2003)
2002–03	ECAC Hockey	22	9‡	10‡	3‡	–	–	–	21	T–7th	35	12‡	20‡	3‡	.386	Lost First Round series, 0–2 (Vermont)	
George Roll (2003 — 2011)
2003–04	ECAC Hockey	22	8	12	2	–	–	–	18	9th	41	18	18	5	.500	Won First Round series, 2–0 (Union); Won Quarterfinal series, 2–1 (Cornell); Won Semifinal, 2–1 (Colgate); Lost Championship, 2–4 (Harvard)	
2004–05	ECAC Hockey	22	7	13	1	–	–	–	17	9th	39	13	23	3	.372	Won First Round series, 2–1 (Union); Lost Quarterfinal series, 0–2 (Cornell)	
2005–06	ECAC Hockey	22	9	11	2	–	–	–	20	8th	38	18	17	3	.513	Won First Round series, 2–0 (Princeton); Lost Quarterfinal series, 0–2 (Cornell)	
2006–07	ECAC Hockey	22	13	4	4	–	–	–	30	2nd	39	25	9	5	.705	Won Quarterfinal series, 2–0 (Harvard); Won Semifinal, 5–4 (Dartmouth); Won Championship, 4–2 (Quinnipiac)	Lost Regional Semifinal, 0–1 (Massachusetts)
2007–08	ECAC Hockey	22	15	4	3	–	–	–	33	1st	39	22	13	4	.615	Lost Quarterfinal series, 1–2 (Colgate)	Won Regional Semifinal, 2–1 (St. Cloud State); Lost Regional Final, 0–2 (Michigan)
2008–09	ECAC Hockey	22	8	10	4	–	–	–	20	T–8th	36	10	19	7	.375	Lost First Round series, 0–2 (Union)	
2009–10	ECAC Hockey	22	4	15	3	–	–	–	11	12th	37	9	24	4	.297	Lost First Round series, 1–2 (St. Lawrence)	
2010–11	ECAC Hockey	22	9	12	1	–	–	–	19	T–7th	36	15	19	2	.444	Lost First Round series, 0–2 (Harvard)	
Casey Jones (2011 — 2024)
2011–12	ECAC Hockey	22	9	9	4	–	–	–	22	T–6th	39	16	17	6	.487	Lost First Round series, 1–2 (Rensselaer)	
2012–13	ECAC Hockey	22	8	11	3	–	–	–	19	T–9th	36	9	20	7	.347	Lost First Round series, 0–2 (Brown)	
2013–14	ECAC Hockey	22	11	9	2	–	–	–	24	T–5th	42	21	17	4	.548	Won First Round series, 2–1 (Princeton); Lost Quarterfinal series, 1–2 (Cornell)	
2014–15	ECAC Hockey	22	8	11	3	–	–	–	19	8th	37	12	20	5	.392	Lost First Round series, 1–2 (Rensselaer)	
2015–16	ECAC Hockey	22	10	9	3	–	–	–	23	T–5th	38	20	15	3	.566	Won First Round series, 2–0 (Princeton); Lost Quarterfinal series, 0–2 (St. Lawrence)	
2016–17	ECAC Hockey	22	10	9	3	–	–	–	23	6th	39	18	16	5	.526	Won First Round series, 2–0 (Rensselaer); Lost Quarterfinal series, 1–2 (Cornell)	
2017–18	ECAC Hockey	22	12	5	5	–	–	–	29	3rd	40	23	11	6	.650	Won Quarterfinal series, 2–1 (Colgate); Won Semifinal, 5–4 (Harvard); Lost Championship, 1–2 (Princeton)	Lost Regional Semifinal, 0–1 (Providence)
2018–19	ECAC Hockey	22	13	7	2	–	–	–	28	T–3rd	39	26	11	2	.692	Won Quarterfinal series, 2–0 (Yale); Won Semifinal, 5–2 (Harvard); Won Championship, 3–2 (OT) (Cornell)	Lost Regional Semifinal, 2–3 (OT) (Notre Dame)
2019–20	ECAC Hockey	22	16	5	1	–	–	–	33	2nd	34	23	8	3	.721	ECAC tournament cancelled	
2020–21	ECAC Hockey	14	6	4	4	1	2	2	.595	2nd	22	11	7	4	.591	Participation cancelled	
2021–22	ECAC Hockey	22	14	4	4	0	2	3	51	2nd	37	21	10	6	.649	Won Quarterfinal series, 2–0 (Union); Lost Semifinal, 3–5 (Harvard)	
2022–23	ECAC Hockey	22	9	10	3	0	1	0	31	6th	37	16	17	4	.486	Won First Round, 5–1 (Brown); Lost Quarterfinal series, 0–2 (Cornell)	
2023–24	ECAC Hockey	22	12	9	1	4	2	1	36	5th	35	18	16	1	.529	Lost First Round, 2–3 (Rensselaer)	
Jean-François Houle (2024 — Present)
2024–25	ECAC Hockey	22	15	6	1	2	1	0	45	2nd	39	24	12	3	.654	Won Quarterfinal series, 2–1 (Harvard); Won Semifinal, 4–1 (Dartmouth); Lost Championship, 1–3 (Cornell)	
Totals											GP	W	L	T	%	Championships	
Regular Season											2469	1458	833	178	.627	10 Tri-State League/ICAC Championships, 10 ECAC Championships	
Conference Post-season											194	104	86	4	.546	6 ECAC tournament championships	
NCAA Post-season											38	13	24	1	.355	22 NCAA Tournament appearances, 7 Frozen Four appearances	
Regular Season and Post-season Record											2701	1575	943	183	.617		

* Winning percentage is used when conference schedules are unbalanced.
† Clarkson played jointly in ECAC Hockey and the Tri-State League/ICAC from 1961 to 1972.
‡ Mark Morris was fired in November 2002.
