= 1931–32 Villanova Wildcats men's ice hockey season =

- Home ice: Philadelphia Ice Palace

Record
- Overall: 2–3–0
- Home: 1–0–0
- Road: 1–0–0
- Neutral: 0–3–0

Coaches and captains
- Head coach: Edward Carney
- Captain: Artie Shortall

The 1931–32 Villanova Wildcats men's ice hockey season was the 3rd season of play for the program.

== Season ==
In just its third season, the Wildcats' ice hockey team was already on its third coach. Rev. Edward J. Carney O. S. A., a professor of religion at the college, agreed to helm the team after Ed Hunsinger declined to return due to a lack of available time. The team, however, was led by 3rd-year player and former team captain, Bill Orcutt along with Artie Shortall, the current captain. While the team knew coming into the season that it would have to contend with the loss of their top offensive player, 'Eskimo' Kennedy, they were hit by an even bigger impediment early in the season; a lack of cold weather. The warm winter meant that the team had precious little time to practice and get used to both the game and one another. Unfortunately, the temperatures continued to stay high and ended up causing the cancellation of their first scheduled game against the Atlantic City Sea Gulls.

It wasn't until late January, when ice time became available at the Philadelphia Ice Palace, that the team managed to get one the ice. Even then the Wildcats still had 12 games on their slate and would try to cram in as many contests as they could before season's end, though most of those would eventually be cancelled. Despite their efforts, Villanova didn't open their season until February, though they were able to win the opening match 4–0. The team travelled to Hershey, Pennsylvania for the next game versus the Athletic Club from Swarthmore. The Wildcats were down after the first half of the game but they were still within striking distance at 0–2. Midway through the second, Shortall was struck in the head by the puck and knocked out of the game. The Wildcats dragooned defenseman Jerry Searight into goaltending duty despite never having played the position before. While they didn't have any better options, the team was unable to make the situation work and surrendered a further 11 goals before the end of the match. The rematch a week later was a little better for Nova but the Wildcats still fell by a wide margin.

At the end of February, the team was back to full strength and faced the most common foe, the Penn Athletic Club. The two teams fought a tight battle for the entire game but Villanova had a lead in the waning minutes of the game. Looking for their first win in 6 matches, the Wildcats were unable to hold their lead and surrendered the tying goal late. The momentum stayed with the Pennacs in overtime and Villanova couldn't stop their opponents from netting the winning marker. Villanova ended its season on a high note with a win over Boonton A. C., however, that did little to save the program.

While the weather had been a problem all season, that was not the program's biggest problem. The team was forced to share its home ice with a litany of other teams both amateur and professional. The result, other than a distinct lack of ice time, was that many of the team games over the past two years were played away from Philadelphia and did not help the team financially. Additionally, because the team was on the road so often, they were unable to generate much in the way of support from the student body. While their losing records didn't help, wins in remote location were akin to a tree falling in a forest and, for an expensive sport in the middle of the Great Depression that was a huge impediment. To make matters worse, there were virtually no local colleges playing ice hockey, leaving Villanova with no contemporaries to play. With all of those issues, the team suspended operations after the year and Villanova didn't play another varsity game for over 50 years.

Charlie Hurlburt, a player from last year's team, was injured during the football season and unable to play this year. However, he did stay with the program, working as the team manager.

== Roster ==
No.	Nat.	Player	Class	Pos	Height	Weight	DoB	Hometown	Previous team
		Donald Blanchard		D
		Richard Clark
		Joseph Delaney		RW
		Ermine Masucci
		William Mulqueen		LW
		William Orcutt		D
		Jerry Searight		G/D
		Arthur Shortall (C)		G
		Albert Trosky		C
		Theodore Ventura

== Standings ==
1931–32 Eastern Collegiate ice hockey standings
	Intercollegiate							Overall					
	GP	W	L	T	Pct.	GF	GA	GP	W	L	T	GF	GA
Amherst	–	–	–	–	–	–	–	4	0	4	0	–	–
Army	–	–	–	–	–	–	–	9	5	4	0	47	37
Bates	–	–	–	–	–	–	–	–	–	–	–	–	–
Boston University	10	6	4	0	.600	35	29	10	6	4	0	35	29
Bowdoin	–	–	–	–	–	–	–	8	1	7	0	–	–
Brown	–	–	–	–	–	–	–	11	5	6	0	–	–
Clarkson	3	2	1	0	.667	14	10	11	7	4	0	50	30
Colgate	–	–	–	–	–	–	–	2	0	2	0	–	–
Dartmouth	–	–	–	–	–	–	–	10	4	6	0	46	42
Hamilton	–	–	–	–	–	–	–	4	2	2	0	–	–
Harvard	–	–	–	–	–	–	–	14	11	1	2	–	–
Massachusetts State	–	–	–	–	–	–	–	4	3	1	0	–	–
Middlebury	–	–	–	–	–	–	–	6	4	2	0	–	–
MIT	–	–	–	–	–	–	–	10	4	6	0	–	–
New Hampshire	–	–	–	–	–	–	–	8	0	8	0	13	34
Northeastern	–	–	–	–	–	–	–	7	6	1	0	–	–
Princeton	–	–	–	–	–	–	–	18	13	4	1	–	–
St. John's	–	–	–	–	–	–	–	–	–	–	–	–	–
Union	–	–	–	–	–	–	–	2	0	2	0	–	–
Villanova	0	0	0	0	–	0	0	5	2	3	0	17	31
Williams	–	–	–	–	–	–	–	8	5	3	0	–	–
Yale	–	–	–	–	–	–	–	20	11	7	2	–	–

== Schedule and results ==
Date	Opponent	Site	Result	Record
Regular season
February 6	Haddon Athletic Club*	Philadelphia Ice Palace • Philadelphia, Pennsylvania	W 4–0	1–0–0
February 13	vs. Swarthmore Athletic Club*	Hershey Ice Palace • Hershey, Pennsylvania	L 1–13	1–1–0
February 20	vs. Swarthmore Athletic Club*	Hershey Ice Palace • Hershey, Pennsylvania	L 5–12	1–2–0
February 27	vs. Penn Athletic Club*	Philadelphia Ice Palace • Philadelphia, Pennsylvania	L 1–2 ^{OT}	1–3–0
March	at Boonton Athletic Club*	Boonton, New Jersey	W 6–4	2–3–0
*Non-conference game.
