= 2026–27 Cornell Big Red men's ice hockey season =

- Conference: ECAC Hockey
- Home ice: Lynah Rink

Rankings
- USCHO: NR
- USA Hockey: NR

Record
- Overall: 2–4–0
- Conference: 1–3–0
- Home: 2–2–0
- Road: 0–2–0
- Neutral: 0–0–0

Coaches and captains
- Head coach: Casey Jones
- Assistant coaches: Sean Flanagan; Chris Brown; Cam Clarke
- Captain: Ryan Walsh
- Alternate captain(s): Tyler Catalano; Luke Devlin; George Fegaras; Jake Kraft

The 2026–27 Cornell Big Red Men's ice hockey season is the 110th season of play for the program and 65th in ECAC Hockey. The Big Red represent Cornell University in the 2026–27 NCAA Division I men's ice hockey season, play their home games at Lynah Rink and are coached by Casey Jones in his second season.

== Departures ==
Player	Position	Nationality	Cause
Jonathan Castagna	Forward	Canada	Signed professional contract (Calgary Flames)
Alexis Cournoyer	Goaltender	Canada	Transferred to Wisconsin
Nick DeSantis	Forward	United States	Graduation (signed with Greensboro Gargoyles)
Sean Donaldson	Forward	Canada	Graduation (retired)
Remington Keopple	Goaltender	United States	Graduation (signed as EBUG of New York Rangers)
Marián Moško	Forward	Slovakia	Left program (retired)
Jack O'Brien	Defenseman	Canada	Graduation (signed with Norfolk Admirals)
Hoyt Stanley	Defenseman	Canada	Signed professional contract (Ottawa Senators)
Winter Wallace	Forward	United States	Graduate transfer to St. Thomas

== Recruiting ==
Player	Position	Nationality	Age	Notes
Charlie Arend	Forward	United States	20	Wilmette, IL
Coco Armstrong	Forward	Canada	20	West Vancouver, BC
Brad Gardiner	Forward	Canada	21	Aurora, ON; selected 79th overall in 2023
Cal Hughes	Forward	United States	20	Westwood, MA
Ryland Randle	Defenseman	Canada	20	Prosper, TX
Mathis Rousseau	Goaltender	Canada	22	Boisbriand, QC; transfer from Maine
Cole Tuminaro	Defenseman	United States	19	Rockton, IL; selected 140th overall in 2026
Louie Wehmann	Forward	United States	20	Wayzata, MN
Ivan Zadvernyuk	Forward	Russia	22	Moscow, RUS; transfer from Brown

== Roster ==
As of November 11, 2026.

No.	Nat.	Player	Class	Pos	Height	Weight	DoB	Hometown	Previous team	NHL rights
2	(United States)	Hudson Gorski	Sophomore	D	6' 3" (1.91 m)	190 lb (86 kg)	2005-09-05	Scotch Plains, New Jersey	Chicago Steel (USHL)	—
3	(Canada)	Luke McCrady	Sophomore	D	6' 3" (1.91 m)	192 lb (87 kg)	2005-11-08	Calgary, Alberta	Spruce Grove Saints (BCHL)	—
4	(Canada)	Xavier Veilleux	Sophomore	D	6' 1" (1.85 m)	200 lb (91 kg)	2006-03-23	L'Ancienne-Lorette, Quebec	Muskegon Lumberjacks (USHL)	NYI, 179th overall 2024
5	(Canada)	Ryland Randle	Freshman	D	5' 10" (1.78 m)	172 lb (78 kg)	2006-05-16	Prosper, Texas	Des Moines Buccaneers (USHL)	—
6	(Canada)	George Fegaras (A)	Senior	D	6' 2" (1.88 m)	204 lb (93 kg)	2004-04-26	Richmond Hill, Ontario	Muskegon Lumberjacks (USHL)	DAL, 83rd overall 2022
7	(Russia)	Ivan Zadvernyuk	Junior	F	6' 3" (1.91 m)	208 lb (94 kg)	2004-04-12	Moscow, Russia	Brown University (ECAC)	—
8	(United States)	Luke Devlin (A)	Senior	F	6' 4" (1.93 m)	200 lb (91 kg)	2004-03-12	Memphis, Tennessee	West Kelowna Warriors (BCHL)	PIT, 182nd overall 2022
9	(United States)	Charlie Major	Junior	F	5' 10" (1.78 m)	186 lb (84 kg)	2004-09-14	Skaneateles, New York	Chicago Steel (USHL)	—
10	(United States)	Jake Kraft (A)	Senior	F	5' 8" (1.73 m)	180 lb (82 kg)	2003-04-26	Churchville, New York	Cedar Rapids RoughRiders (USHL)	—
11	(Canada)	Luke Ashton	Junior	D	6' 5" (1.96 m)	230 lb (104 kg)	2005-01-21	North Vancouver, British Columbia	Minnesota State University (CCHA)	CBJ, 165th overall 2024
12	(Canada)	Caton Ryan	Sophomore	F	6' 0" (1.83 m)	189 lb (86 kg)	2006-06-25	Ottawa, Ontario	Penticton Vees (BCHL)	—
13	(United States)	Gio DiGiulian	Sophomore	F	6' 1" (1.85 m)	183 lb (83 kg)	2005-09-25	South Burlington, Vermont	Lincoln Stars (USHL)	—
14	(United States)	Ryan Walsh (C)	Senior	F	6' 1" (1.85 m)	197 lb (89 kg)	2003-08-25	Rochester, New York	Cedar Rapids RoughRiders (USHL)	BOS, 188th overall 2023
15	(United States)	Tyler Catalano (A)	Senior	F	6' 4" (1.93 m)	215 lb (98 kg)	2004-02-26	St. Louis, Missouri	Youngstown Phantoms (USHL)	—
16	(United States)	Michael Fisher	Junior	D	6' 3" (1.91 m)	203 lb (92 kg)	2004-05-02	Westborough, Massachusetts	Penticton Vees (BCHL)	SJS, 76th overall 2022
17	(Canada)	Aiden Long	Sophomore	F	6' 2" (1.88 m)	207 lb (94 kg)	2005-03-13	Mono, Ontario	Madison Capitols (USHL)	—
18	(Canada)	Reegan Hiscock	Sophomore	F	6' 5" (1.96 m)	210 lb (95 kg)	2004-07-02	St. John's, Newfoundland and Labrador	Victoria Grizzlies (BCHL)	—
19	(Canada)	Connor Arseneault	Sophomore	F	6' 2" (1.88 m)	220 lb (100 kg)	2006-03-01	Rothesay, New Brunswick	Chilliwack Chiefs (BCHL)	—
20	(Canada)	Brad Gardiner	Freshman	F	6' 1" (1.85 m)	195 lb (88 kg)	2005-03-06	Aurora, Ontario	Barrie Colts (OHL)	—
21	(United States)	Louie Wehmann	Freshman	F	6' 1" (1.85 m)	218 lb (99 kg)	2006-04-12	Wayzata, Minnesota	Penticton Vees (WHL)	—
22	(United States)	Chase Pirtle	Sophomore	F	6' 2" (1.88 m)	198 lb (90 kg)	2005-03-08	Far Hills, New Jersey	Victoria Grizzlies (BCHL)	—
23	(United States)	Charlie Arend	Freshman	F	6' 1" (1.85 m)	188 lb (85 kg)	2006-01-10	Wilmette, Illinois	Dubuque Fighting Saints (USHL)	—
24	(Canada)	Nicholas Wolfenberg	Junior	D	6' 2" (1.88 m)	204 lb (93 kg)	2004-06-11	Calgary, Alberta	Okotoks Oilers (BCHL)	—
26	(United States)	Donovan Hamilton	Sophomore	D	6' 3" (1.91 m)	203 lb (92 kg)	2005-12-03	Buffalo, New York	Salmon Arm Silverbacks (BCHL)	—
27	(United States)	Cal Hughes	Freshman	F	6' 0" (1.83 m)	182 lb (83 kg)	2006-01-22	Westwood, Massachusetts	Erie Otters (OHL)	—
28	(United States)	Cole Tuminaro	Freshman	D	6' 4" (1.93 m)	220 lb (100 kg)	2007-01-24	Rockton, Illinois	Chicago Steel (USHL)	COL, 140th overall 2026
29	(United States)	Parker Murray	Junior	F	6' 5" (1.96 m)	226 lb (103 kg)	2003-09-26	Manhattan Beach, California	Chilliwack Chiefs (BCHL)	—
36	(Canada)	Coco Armstrong	Freshman	F	6' 0" (1.83 m)	191 lb (87 kg)	2006-05-26	West Vancouver, British Columbia	Spokane Chiefs (WHL)	—
37	(Canada)	Justin Katz	Junior	G	6' 1" (1.85 m)	187 lb (85 kg)	2004-10-28	Montreal, Quebec	Powell River Kings (BCHL)	—
40	(Canada)	Erick Roest	Sophomore	G	6' 0" (1.83 m)	182 lb (83 kg)	2004-10-26	Lethbridge, Alberta	Cowichan Valley Capitals (BCHL)	—
60	(Canada)	Mathis Rousseau	Sophomore	G	5' 11" (1.8 m)	184 lb (83 kg)	2004-09-10	Boisbriand, Quebec	University of Maine (HEA)	—

== Standings ==
2026–27 ECAC Hockey Standings
	Conference record										Overall record					
	GP	W	L	T	OTW	OTL	SW	PTS	GF	GA	GP	W	L	T	GF	GA
Clarkson	2	2	0	0	0	0	0	6	10	2	10	5	4	1	28	23
Union	4	2	2	0	0	0	0	6	12	14	9	5	4	0	33	26
#6 Dartmouth	2	2	0	0	0	0	0	6	6	3	4	4	0	0	16	3
St. Lawrence	2	1	0	1	0	0	1	5	4	3	6	1	4	1	16	23
Yale	3	2	1	0	1	0	0	5	8	7	3	2	1	0	8	7
#8 Quinnipiac	2	2	0	0	1	0	0	5	8	4	9	7	2	0	43	23
Harvard	2	1	1	0	0	1	0	4	7	5	4	2	2	0	11	10
Colgate	2	1	1	0	0	1	0	4	8	6	10	2	8	0	20	32
Cornell	2	1	1	0	0	0	0	3	4	6	4	2	2	0	11	11
Rensselaer	4	0	3	1	0	0	0	1	8	15	10	4	5	1	26	27
Princeton	2	0	2	0	0	0	0	0	4	8	4	2	2	0	10	10
Brown	3	0	3	0	0	0	0	0	3	9	3	0	3	0	3	9
Championship: March 20, 2027 † indicates conference regular season champion (Cleary Cup) * indicates conference tournament champion (Whitelaw Cup); Rankings: USCHO.com Top 20 Poll; updated November 11, 2026

== Schedule and results ==
Date	Time	Opponent^{#}	Rank^{#}	Site	TV	Decision	Result	Attendance	Record
Exhibition
October 17	7:00 pm	Waterloo*	#13	Lynah Rink • Ithaca, New York (Exhibition)	ESPN+	Rousseau	W 4–1	2,971	
Regular season
October 30	7:00 pm	Sacred Heart*	#15	Lynah Rink • Ithaca, New York	ESPN+	Rousseau	W 5–2	2,754	1–0–0
October 31	7:00 pm	Sacred Heart*	#15	Lynah Rink • Ithaca, New York	ESPN+	Rousseau	L 2–3	2,605	1–1–0
November 6	7:00 pm	#6 Quinnipiac	#16	Lynah Rink • Ithaca, New York	ESPN+	Rousseau	L 1–4	3,390	1–2–0 (0–1–0)
November 7	7:00 pm	Princeton	#16	Lynah Rink • Ithaca, New York	ESPN+	Rousseau	W 3–2	3,724	2–2–0 (1–1–0)
November 13	7:00 pm	at Brown	#16	Meehan Auditorium • Providence, Rhode Island	ESPN+	Rousseau	L 1–3	1,467	2–3–0 (1–2–0)
November 14	7:00 pm	at Yale	#16	Ingalls Rink • New Haven, Connecticut	ESPN+	Rousseau	L 1–3	2,379	2–4–0 (1–3–0)
November 20	7:00 pm	Clarkson		Lynah Rink • Ithaca, New York	ESPN+, SNY				
November 21	7:00 pm	St. Lawrence		Lynah Rink • Ithaca, New York	ESPN+				
November 28	12:00 pm	vs. Maine*		Madison Square Garden • Manhattan, New York (The Frozen Apple)	ESPN+				
December 4	7:00 pm	Boston University*		Lynah Rink • Ithaca, New York (Rivalry)	ESPN+				
December 5	7:00 pm	RIT*		Lynah Rink • Ithaca, New York	ESPN+				
December 8	7:00 pm	Holy Cross*		Lynah Rink • Ithaca, New York	ESPN+				
January 2	5:00 pm	at Omaha*		Baxter Arena • Omaha, Nebraska	NCHC.tv				
January 3	3:00 pm	at Omaha*		Baxter Arena • Omaha, Nebraska	NCHC.tv				
January 8	7:00 pm	at Union		M&T Bank Center • Schenectady, New York	ESPN+				
January 9	4:00 pm	at Rensselaer		Houston Field House • Troy, New York	ESPN+, SNY				
January 15	7:00 pm	at Princeton		Hobey Baker Memorial Rink • Princeton, New Jersey	ESPN+				
January 16	7:00 pm	at Quinnipiac		M&T Bank Arena • Hamden, Connecticut	ESPN+				
January 22	7:00 pm	Harvard		Lynah Rink • Ithaca, New York (Rivalry)	ESPN+, SNY				
January 23	7:00 pm	Dartmouth		Lynah Rink • Ithaca, New York	ESPN+				
January 29	7:00 pm	Colgate		Lynah Rink • Ithaca, New York	ESPN+				
January 30	7:00 pm	at Colgate		Class of 1965 Arena • Hamilton, New York	ESPN+				
February 5	7:00 pm	at St. Lawrence		Appleton Arena • Canton, New York	ESPN+				
February 6	7:00 pm	at Clarkson		Cheel Arena • Potsdam, New York	ESPN+, SNY				
February 12	7:00 pm	Yale		Lynah Rink • Ithaca, New York	ESPN+				
February 13	7:00 pm	Brown		Lynah Rink • Ithaca, New York	ESPN+				
February 19	7:00 pm	at Dartmouth		Thompson Arena • Hanover, New Hampshire	ESPN+				
February 20	7:00 pm	at Harvard		Bright-Landry Hockey Center • Boston, Massachusetts (Rivalry)	ESPN+				
February 26	7:00 pm	Rensselaer		Lynah Rink • Ithaca, New York	ESPN+				
February 27	7:00 pm	Union		Lynah Rink • Ithaca, New York	ESPN+				
*Non-conference game. ^{#}Rankings from USCHO.com Poll. All times are in Eastern Time. Source:

== Rankings ==
Poll	Week																											
Poll	Pre	1	2	3	4	5	6	7	8	9	10	11	12	13	14	15	16	17	18	19	20	21	22	23	24	25	26	27 (Final)
USCHO.com	13	13	13	14	15	16	16	NR					–														–	
USA Hockey	13	12	12	12	13т	16	16	NR					–															

Note: USCHO does not release a poll in week 12 or 26.
Note: USA Hockey does not release a poll in week 12.
