= Jack Roos =

Canadian ice hockey player and coach

Biographical details
- Born: 1897; Blanche, Quebec, Canada
- Died: 1980
- Education: University of Ottawa

Playing career
- ?–1918: Ottawa
- ?–1927: St. Paul Saints

Coaching career (HC unless noted)
- 1929–1948: Clarkson

Head coaching record
- Overall: 134–79–7 (.628)

Accomplishments and honors

Championships
- 1935 East Intercollegiate Champion; 1936 East Intercollegiate Champion (tied); 1938 East Intercollegiate Champion

John Roos (1897 – 1980) was a Canadian ice hockey player and coach who led the program at Clarkson to three eastern intercollegiate titles in the 1930s.

== Career ==
Roos played junior hockey in and around the Ottawa area as well as at the University of Ottawa. After graduating, he travelled to Minnesota and played for the Duluth Hornets and St. Paul Saints throughout most of the 1920s. In 1929, after the death of star player Harry Heintzman and the resignation of Gordon Croskery, Roos was brought in to be the head coach at Clarkson. He helped steady the program and nearly led them to a championship in his second season.

After a few mediocre years, Roos got the program to break through with a title in 1935 and followed that up with a second championship the next year (shared with Harvard). In 1938 he got the Golden Knights to perform better than they had before and finished with a 13–1–1 record and earned their third eastern title. On top of that, Clarkson was named by the associated press as the national ice hockey champion, though that title isn't official. With three titles in 4 years, Clarkson University finally agreed to build a long-called-for ice rink for the program and the Clarkson Arena was completed in time for the following season.

Roos had another near miss championship in 1941 and then watched as World War II sapped both his team and all of college hockey of their players. The Knights tried to soldier on but, after a winless season in 1944, finally succumbed to the inevitable and suspended operations. The team returned in 1946 with Roos still at the helm and he began to rebuild the Knights. After a solid, if unspectacular, season in 1948, Roos retired from his position and turned the program over to Bill Harrison.

== Statistics ==
=== Regular season and playoffs ===
			Regular season					Playoffs
Season	Team	League	GP	G	A	Pts	PIM	GP	G	A	Pts	PIM
1917–18	Ottawa	CIAU	—	—	—	—	—	—	—	—	—	—
1926–27	St. Paul Saints	AHA	—	—	—	—	—	—	—	—	—	—

Note: Statistics are incomplete.

== Head coaching record ==
Record table
Season	Team	Overall	Conference	Standing	Postseason
Clarkson Golden Knights Independent (1929–1944)
1929–30	Clarkson	8–2–0			
1930–31	Clarkson	9–1–0			
1931–32	Clarkson	7–4–0			
1932–33	Clarkson	6–5–0			
1933–34	Clarkson	6–4–0			
1934–35	Clarkson	10–3–0			
1935–36	Clarkson	13–2–1			
1936–37	Clarkson	6–3–0			
1937–38	Clarkson	13–1–1			
1938–39	Clarkson	8–12–2			
1939–40	Clarkson	10–8–1			
1940–41	Clarkson	10–3–0			
1941–42	Clarkson	8–6–0			
1942–43	Clarkson	3–5–0			
1943–44	Clarkson	0–7–0			
1946–47	Clarkson	7–7–1			
1947–48	Clarkson	10–6–1			
Clarkson:		134–79–7			
Total:		134–79–7			
National champion Postseason invitational champion Conference regular season champion Conference regular season and conference tournament champion Division regular season champion Division regular season and conference tournament champion Conference tournament champion
