= 1929–30 Clarkson Golden Knights men's ice hockey season =

Intercollegiate hockey season

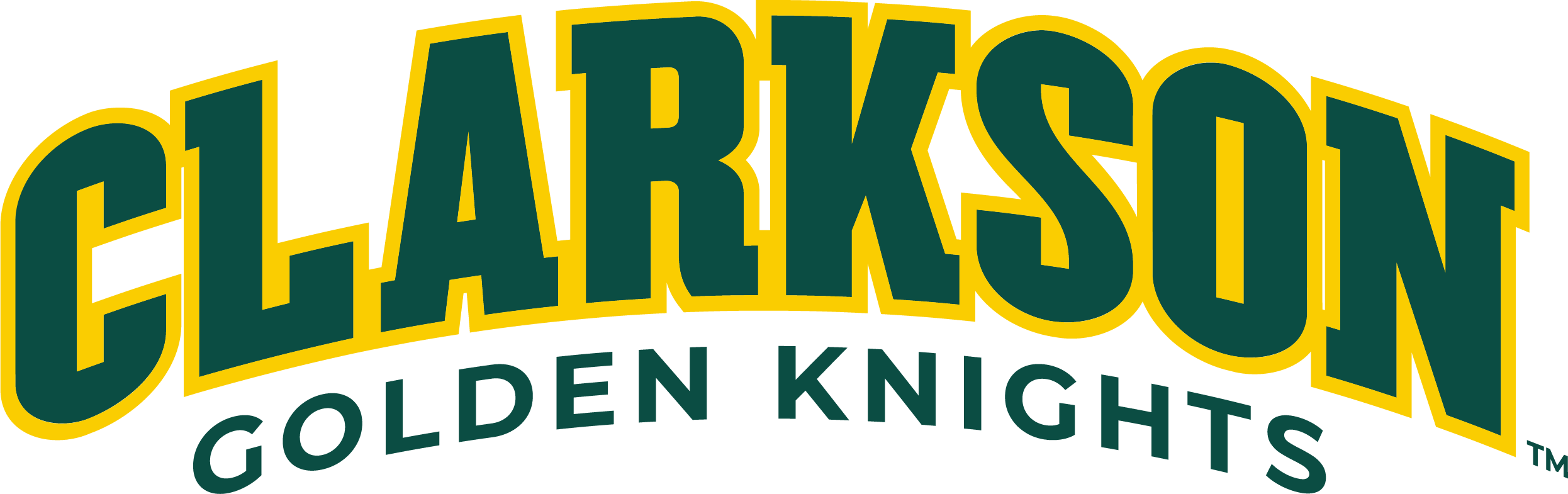
- Home ice: Ives Park

Record
- Overall: 8–2–0
- Home: 4–0–0
- Road: 4–2–0

Coaches and captains
- Head coach: Jack Roos

The 1929–30 Clarkson Golden Knights men's ice hockey season was the 10th season of play for the program. The team was coached by Jack Roos in his 1st season.

== Season ==
After three consecutive seasons being one of the best teams in the country, Clarkson had to contend with serious problems at the start of the season. In August, captain-elect William Harrison Heintzman was suffering from a throat infection and had an operation to address the condition. He appeared to recover after surgery and began to train for his senior season but began experiencing complications. His condition worsened and he deteriorated, dying on August 21 at the age of 25. While that tragedy unfolded, the team also had to deal with the loss of Professor Gordon Croskery, the team's head coach, who had left the college after the previous season. Harry Hodge, the school's assistant coach of athletics, was put in charge of the team until a permanent replacement was found. Jack Roos was eventually hired for the job and had a tough task to lead the team after Heintzman death.

In Heintzman's memory, no captain was named for the year and the team did well to soldier on. After several exhibition wins in Canada, Clarkson opened the season in Ottawa and played a raucous game against Ashbury, winning 9–6. Upon returning home, the defense recovered its typical form and the team shutout Loyola 2–0. Warm weather forced a game with MIT on 10 January to be rescheduled for early February. After dropping a Ashbury college in a mid-January rematch, the team headed on a trip south. They sandwiched two overwhelming victories around a close loss to Princeton, ending Tech's 10-game winning streak.

Soft ice against forced the postponement of a game, this time the tilt against St. Lawrence was moved from January 28 until mid-February. Rink conditions improved well enough for the match against McGill to take place. Entering the contest, the Redmen were one of the top teams in Canada and were expected to be a tough challenge for the Knights. 1,500 fans showed up to Ives Park to watch Tech roll over the visitors and earn their sixth win on the season. Three days later, the team performed a similar feat against the weaker team from MIT and notched their fourth shutout of the season. At the end of the week, Clarkson travelled down to New Haven to take on the top team in the nation, Yale. Tech was able to keep the game close in the first period, but the Elis dominated the second and then closed down all avenues of attack in the final frame. The 1–5 loss signaled that Clarkson still had a ways to go before they could compete for a national championship.

The Knights ended their season at home against bitter rival St. Lawrence, demolishing the Saints with a 17–0 victory. Even without the normal center Williams, it was both the most goals scored and largest margin of victory for Tech in the ten years of the program's existence. Wally Easton needed to only make 3 saves in his fifth shutout on the year while 'Peck' Donald and Clarence 'Ike' Houston led the offense to a triumphant win.

Kenneth Armin served as team manager for the season.

== Roster ==
No.	Nat.	Player	Class	Pos	Height	Weight	DoB	Hometown	Previous team
	(United States)	Charles Beneke	Junior					Liverpool, New York
		Louis Boyle	Freshman	F
	(Canada)	John Burke	Junior	F/D				London, Ontario
	(Canada)	C. Gordon Donald	Sophomore	F/D				Carleton Place, Ontario
	(Canada)	Wallace Easton	Junior	G				Renfrew, Ontario
	(Canada)	Wilbur Guest	Junior	D				Renfrew, Ontario
	(Canada)	Clarence Houston	Sophomore	F				Arnprior, Ontario
	(Canada)	Robert Houston	Freshman	F				Arnprior, Ontario
	(Canada)	Ray Levia	Freshman	F				Carleton Place, Ontario
	(Canada)	Carol Williams	Sophomore	F				Carleton Place, Ontario

== Standings ==
1929–30 Eastern Collegiate ice hockey standings
	Intercollegiate							Overall					
	GP	W	L	T	Pct.	GF	GA	GP	W	L	T	GF	GA
Amherst	9	2	7	0	.222	12	30	9	2	7	0	12	30
Army	10	6	2	2	.700	28	18	11	6	3	2	31	23
Bates	11	6	4	1	.591	28	21	11	6	4	1	28	21
Boston University	10	4	5	1	.450	34	31	13	4	8	1	40	48
Bowdoin	9	2	7	0	.222	12	29	9	2	7	0	12	29
Brown	–	–	–	–	–	–	–	12	8	3	1	–	–
Clarkson	6	4	2	0	.667	50	11	10	8	2	0	70	18
Colby	7	4	2	1	.643	19	15	7	4	2	1	19	15
Colgate	6	1	4	1	.250	9	19	6	1	4	1	9	19
Connecticut Agricultural	–	–	–	–	–	–	–	–	–	–	–	–	–
Cornell	6	4	2	0	.667	29	18	6	4	2	0	29	18
Dartmouth	–	–	–	–	–	–	–	13	5	8	0	44	54
Hamilton	–	–	–	–	–	–	–	8	4	4	0	–	–
Harvard	10	7	2	1	.750	44	14	12	7	4	1	48	23
Massachusetts Agricultural	11	7	4	0	.636	25	25	11	7	4	0	25	25
Middlebury	8	6	2	0	.750	26	13	8	6	2	0	26	13
MIT	8	4	4	0	.500	16	27	8	4	4	0	16	27
New Hampshire	11	3	6	2	.364	20	30	13	3	8	2	22	42
Northeastern	–	–	–	–	–	–	–	7	2	5	0	–	–
Norwich	–	–	–	–	–	–	–	6	0	4	2	–	–
Pennsylvania	10	4	6	0	.400	36	39	11	4	7	0	40	49
Princeton	–	–	–	–	–	–	–	18	9	8	1	–	–
Rensselaer	–	–	–	–	–	–	–	3	1	2	0	–	–
St. John's	–	–	–	–	–	–	–	–	–	–	–	–	–
St. Lawrence	–	–	–	–	–	–	–	4	0	4	0	–	–
St. Stephen's	–	–	–	–	–	–	–	–	–	–	–	–	–
Union	5	2	2	1	.500	8	18	5	2	2	1	8	18
Vermont	–	–	–	–	–	–	–	–	–	–	–	–	–
Villanova	1	0	1	0	.000	3	7	4	0	3	1	13	22
Williams	9	4	4	1	.500	28	32	9	4	4	1	28	32
Yale	14	12	1	1	.893	80	21	19	17	1	1	110	28

== Schedule and results ==
Date	Opponent	Site	Result	Record
Regular season
January 4	at Ashbury*	Ottawa, Ontario	W 9–6 ^{†}	1–0–0
January 7	Loyola*	Ives Park • Potsdam, New York	W 2–0	2–0–0
January 17	Ashbury*	Ives Park • Potsdam, New York	W 3–1	3–0–0
January 21	at Penn*	Philadelphia Ice Palace • Philadelphia, Pennsylvania	W 13–0 ^{‡}	4–0–0
January 22	at Princeton*	Hobey Baker Memorial Rink • Princeton, New Jersey	L 2–4	4–1–0
January 26	at Cornell*	Beebe Lake • Ithaca, New York	W 8–0	5–1–0
January 31	McGill*	Ives Park • Potsdam, New York	W 6–2	6–1–0
February 3	MIT*	Ives Park • Potsdam, New York	W 9–0	7–1–0
February 8	at Yale*	New Haven Arena • New Haven, Connecticut	L 1–5	7–2–0
February 15	at St. Lawrence*	Brewer Field Rink • Canton, New York	W 17–0	8–2–0
*Non-conference game.

† Clarkson's records list three different final scores for the game: 9–6, 8–4 (against 'Roxbury') and 8–1.
‡ Penn reported the score of the game as 12–0.
