= 1931–32 Clarkson Golden Knights men's ice hockey season =

Intercollegiate hockey season

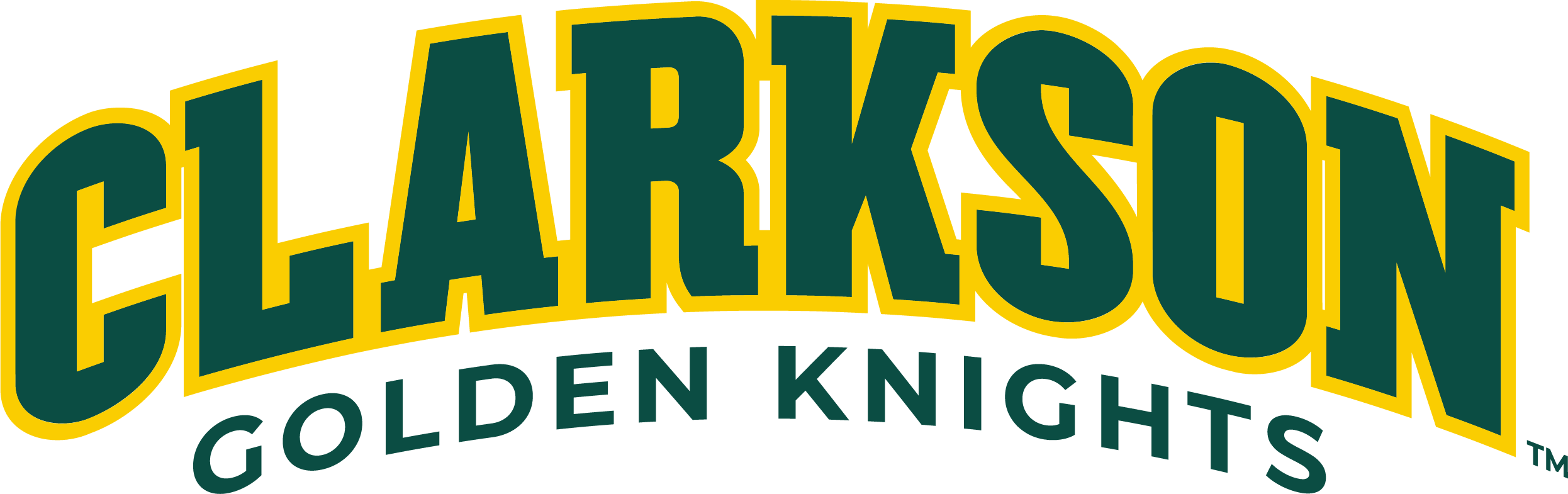
- Home ice: Clarkson Rink

Record
- Overall: 7–4–0
- Home: 2–1–0
- Road: 5–3–0

Coaches and captains
- Head coach: Jack Roos

The 1931–32 Clarkson Golden Knights men's ice hockey season was the 12th season of play for the program. The team was coached by Jack Roos in his 3rd season.

== Season ==
From the start, the team knew that this season would be a bit more trying than the past near-championship years. Clarkson lost three of its defensive stalwarts to graduation and would have to find a replacement for All-American goaltender Wally Easton. Coach Roos took charge of the team just before classes let out for the winter break and proceeded to lead the team through practices in Canada. The first two games for the team were against amateur clubs before Christmas and the team earned a split on the road. The players were then allowed to go home for the last week of December and reconvened in Potsdam after the new year. The Golden Knights were greeted by the sight of their new rink; located on Clarkson avenue, the venue was less centrally located than their previous home, but the site was chosen to take advantage of the hills on the Clarkson campus. High winds had been plaguing the team at Ives Park and they were hoping the new location would fix or at least improve that issue.

In spite of a raucous crowd, the team lost its first home game since 1926, ending a streak of 24 wins. Curiously, it was the offense that failed Tech as the team lost to Queen's on a goal scored in the last minutes of the match. The team rebounded with a 6–0 win over Victoria a few days later but the weather soon became a factor. A game on January 8 against Saint Mary's was cancelled when the rink's ice melted from a sudden thaw. While the rink was tended to, the team was forced to practice on the Raquette River in preparation for their trip south.

The first game of the road trip was a meeting with Princeton for the fifth consecutive year. With fog making visibility poor throughout the game, Clarkson's offense played well but they couldn't match the Tigers' netminder. Sticky ice kept the game slow and Tech could only muster a single goal in the loss. The following evening, the team played an amateur team in Atlantic City in front of a crowd of 8,000 spectators. The ice conditions were much more favorable and the team skated better, but they fell by the same margin. In what was shaping up to be a bad year for the team, the Knights' next opponent was the defending intercollegiate champion, Yale. While not as strong as they had been, the Elis were still 8–3 and in position to repeat as champions. The game started as expected, with the Bulldogs scoring twice to build an early advantage. The second, however, saw a dramatic change with Clarkson scoring four times with seemingly all of their skaters out playing the Elis. Clarkson produced what was considered the biggest win in the history of the program, being the first college team to take down the Bulldogs in almost three years.

The victory seemed to solve most of team's problems, but it couldn't settle the trouble with the weather. A lack of ice forced the cancelation of games against the Polish national team, Marquette and Ottawa. The team was only able to play one further game at home but they showed out, dominating Loyola 9–2. Tech continued winning as they finished the year on the road. The offense, led by 'Peck' Donald and Clarence 'Ike' Houston, made a strong showing in each game, allowing the Knights to end the year on a high note.

Donald Orton served as team manager for the season.

== Roster ==
No.	Nat.	Player	Class	Pos	Height	Weight	DoB	Hometown	Previous team
		Louis Boyle	Junior	D
	(Canada)	C. Gordon Donald	Senior	F				Carleton Place, Ontario
	(Canada)	G. Alex Higginson	Freshman	D				Ottawa, Ontario
	(Canada)	Clarence Houston	Senior	F				Arnprior, Ontario
	(Canada)	Robert Houston	Sophomore	F				Arnprior, Ontario
	(Canada)	Thomas Kettles	Freshman	G				Ottawa, Ontario
	(Canada)	Quain McCarry	Senior	D				Montreal, Quebec
	(Canada)	Robert McNab	Sophomore	F				Douglas, Ontario
	(Canada)	Robert Moore	Junior	D				Renfrew, Ontario
		J. Newton Murray	Freshman
	(Canada)	Kenneth Smith	Senior					Yarker, Ontario

== Standings ==
1931–32 Eastern Collegiate ice hockey standings
	Intercollegiate							Overall					
	GP	W	L	T	Pct.	GF	GA	GP	W	L	T	GF	GA
Amherst	–	–	–	–	–	–	–	4	0	4	0	–	–
Army	–	–	–	–	–	–	–	9	5	4	0	47	37
Bates	–	–	–	–	–	–	–	–	–	–	–	–	–
Boston University	10	6	4	0	.600	35	29	10	6	4	0	35	29
Bowdoin	–	–	–	–	–	–	–	8	1	7	0	–	–
Brown	–	–	–	–	–	–	–	11	5	6	0	–	–
Clarkson	3	2	1	0	.667	14	10	11	7	4	0	50	30
Colgate	–	–	–	–	–	–	–	2	0	2	0	–	–
Dartmouth	–	–	–	–	–	–	–	10	4	6	0	46	42
Hamilton	–	–	–	–	–	–	–	4	2	2	0	–	–
Harvard	–	–	–	–	–	–	–	14	11	1	2	–	–
Massachusetts State	–	–	–	–	–	–	–	4	3	1	0	–	–
Middlebury	–	–	–	–	–	–	–	6	4	2	0	–	–
MIT	–	–	–	–	–	–	–	10	4	6	0	–	–
New Hampshire	–	–	–	–	–	–	–	8	0	8	0	13	34
Northeastern	–	–	–	–	–	–	–	7	6	1	0	–	–
Princeton	–	–	–	–	–	–	–	18	13	4	1	–	–
St. John's	–	–	–	–	–	–	–	–	–	–	–	–	–
Union	–	–	–	–	–	–	–	2	0	2	0	–	–
Villanova	0	0	0	0	–	0	0	5	2	3	0	17	31
Williams	–	–	–	–	–	–	–	8	5	3	0	–	–
Yale	–	–	–	–	–	–	–	20	11	7	2	–	–

== Schedule and results ==
Date	Opponent	Site	Result	Record
Regular season
December 19	at Perth Crescents*	Perth, Ontario	W 5–2	1–0–0
December 19	at Magedoma Club*	Brockville, Ontario	L 1–4	1–1–0
January 2	Queen's*	Clarkson Rink • Potsdam, New York	L 0–1	1–2–0
January 5	Victoria*	Clarkson Rink • Potsdam, New York	W 6–0	2–2–0
January 13	at Princeton*	Hobey Baker Memorial Rink • Princeton, New Jersey	L 1–3	2–3–0
January 14	at Atlantic City Sea Gulls*	Atlantic City Auditorium • Atlantic City, New Jersey	L 1–3	2–4–0
January 21	at Yale*	New Haven Arena • New Haven, Connecticut	W 4–3	3–4–0
February 9	Loyola*	Clarkson Rink • Potsdam, New York	W 9–2	4–4–0
February 19	at Montagnards*	Ottawa, Ontario	W 8–3	5–4–0
February 24	at Syracuse A.C.*	Syracuse Coliseum • Syracuse, New York	W 6–5	6–4–0
February 28	at Army*	Smith Rink • West Point, New York	W 9–4	7–4–0
*Non-conference game.
