= 2020–21 Quinnipiac Bobcats men's ice hockey season =

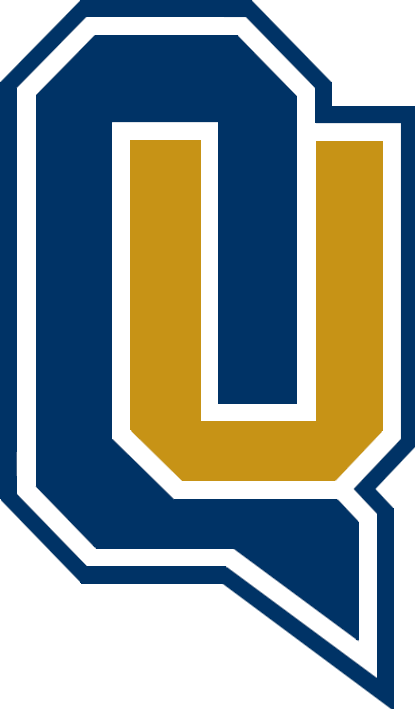

ECAC Hockey, Champion NCAA Tournament, Regional semifinals
- Conference: 1st ECAC Hockey
- Home ice: People's United Center

Rankings
- USCHO: 12
- USA Today: 11

Record
- Overall: 17–8–4
- Conference: 10–4–4–1–1–3
- Home: 11–6–0
- Road: 6–1–4
- Neutral: 0–1–0

Coaches and captains
- Head coach: Rand Pecknold
- Assistant coaches: Bill Riga; Joe Dumais; Justin Eddy
- Captain: Odeen Tufto
- Alternate captain(s): Wyatt Bongiovanni; Peter DiLiberatore

The 2020–21 Quinnipiac Bobcats Men's ice hockey season was the 45th season of play for the program, the 23rd at the Division I level and the 16th season in the ECAC Hockey conference. The Bobcats represented the Quinnipiac University and played their home games at the Frank Perrotti, Jr. Arena in the People's United Center, and were coached by Rand Pecknold, in his 27th season.

== Season ==
As a result of the ongoing COVID-19 pandemic the entire college ice hockey season was delayed. Because the NCAA had previously announced that all winter sports athletes would retain whatever eligibility they possessed through at least the following year, none of Quinnipiac's players would lose a season of play. However, the NCAA also approved a change in its transfer regulations that would allow players to transfer and play immediately rather than having to sit out a season, as the rules previously required.

Quinnipiac was one of the few teams to play a decent amount of non-conference games during the 20–21 season. The Bobcats played their first 8 games against teams not in ECAC Hockey and performed well, going 6–2. The team continued that level of play throughout the season, consistently being ranked near the middle of the top-20. The stars of the season were team captain Odeen Tufto and starting goaltender Keith Petruzzelli, both seniors. Tufto led the team in scoring by a wide margin, finishing the year with 47 points and was second in the nation. Petruzzelli backstopped the team to a league title and was named as the best goaltender in the conference, allowing less than 2 goals per game on the year.

With their stellar record, the Bobcats were all but guaranteed a spot in the NCAA Tournament but the team still wanted to earn capture the ECAC championship. Due to 8 of the 12 ECAC teams cancelling their seasons, Quinnipiac would only have to win two games to win the crown. However, due to Clarkson cancelling its season after COVID protocol violations, Quinnipiac received a bye into the title game, becoming the first team at the Division I level to play a one-off game for an automatic bid since 1960. In the title game the Bobcats started slow, recording just 4 shots in the first period, but took over in the middle frame. After taking a 2–1 lead into the third, Quinnipiac tried to win a 1-goal game but St. Lawrence fought back and tied the score with less than 5 minutes to play. The game went into overtime and, after less than 4 minutes, Quinnipiac found themselves on the wrong side of the winning goal, losing the title to the Larries.

A day after the conference tournament, St. Lawrence's head coach tested positive for COVID and the team was forced to withdraw from the NCAA tournament. As a result, Quinnipiac was given the ECAC automatic bid instead, though it was likely that the team would have been selected as an at-large bid anyway. In their opening game of the tournament, Quinnipiac showed none of the hesitancy that they had the game before and roared out to a 2-goal lead after 20 minutes. Once they had their advantage, however, the team slowed in the middle and allowed Minnesota State to cut their lead in half. A more even third period saw the Bobcats restore their 2-goal edge but the Mavericks wouldn't go away and, over the course of the final 11 minutes, Quinnipiac's lead was eroded and MSU tied the game with just over a minute to play. With the team having once again blown a lead, the Bobcats were overwhelmed in the extra session and were outshot 7–2 before Minnesota State ended their season.

== Departures ==
Player	Position	Nationality	Cause
Kārlis Čukste	Defenseman	Latvia	Graduation (signed with San Jose Barracuda)
William Fällström	Forward	Sweden	Signed professional contract (Tingsryds AIF)
P. J. Fletcher	Forward	United States	Returned to juniors (transferred to Miami)
Nick Jermain	Forward	United States	Graduation (signed with Coventry Blaze)
Jeremy Smith	Defenseman	Canada	Transferred to Hamilton
Alex Whelan	Forward	United States	Graduation (signed with Hartford Wolf Pack)

== Recruiting ==
Player	Position	Nationality	Age	Notes
Nick Bochen	Defenseman	Canada	19	North Vancouver, BC
Joey Cipollone	Forward	United States	21	Purchase, NY; transfer from Vermont
Corey Clifton	Forward	United States	21	Matawan, NJ
Christophe Fillion	Forward	Canada	20	Sherbrooke, QC
Tyler Ghirardosi	Forward	Canada	20	Trail, BC
Yaniv Perets	Goaltender	Canada	20	Dollard-des-Ormeaux, QC
Iivari Räsänen	Defenseman	Finland	19	Tampere, FIN
Ty Smilanic	Forward	United States	18	Denver, CO; Selected 74th overall in 2020

== Roster ==
As of March 17, 2021.

No.	Nat.	Player	Class	Pos	Height	Weight	DoB	Hometown	Previous team	NHL rights
1	(Canada)	Yaniv Perets	Freshman	G	6' 1" (1.85 m)	180 lb (82 kg)	2000-03-04	Dollard-des-Ormeaux, Quebec	Penticton Vees (BCHL)	—
2	(Finland)	Iivari Räsänen	Freshman	D	6' 1" (1.85 m)	200 lb (91 kg)	2001-05-23	Tampere, Finland	Muskegon Lumberjacks (USHL)	—
3	(Canada)	Peter DiLiberatore (A)	Junior	D	6' 0" (1.83 m)	185 lb (84 kg)	2000-03-31	Bedford, Nova Scotia	Salisbury School (USHS–CT)	VGK, 180th overall 2018
4	(United States)	Michael Lombardi	Junior	D	6' 0" (1.83 m)	190 lb (86 kg)	1998-08-20	Barrington, Rhode Island	West Kelowna Warriors (BCHL)	—
5	(United States)	C. J. McGee	Sophomore	D	6' 0" (1.83 m)	180 lb (82 kg)	1999-03-12	Pearl River, New York	Shreveport Mudbugs (NAHL)	—
7	(United States)	Marcus Chorney	Sophomore	D	6' 1" (1.85 m)	190 lb (86 kg)	1997-09-16	Hastings, Minnesota	Amarillo Bulls (NAHL)	—
8	(Canada)	Nick Bochen	Freshman	D	5' 9" (1.75 m)	165 lb (75 kg)	2001-08-29	North Vancouver, British Columbia	Prince George Spruce Kings (BCHL)	—
10	(Canada)	Ethan de Jong	Junior	F	5' 11" (1.8 m)	180 lb (82 kg)	1999-07-12	North Vancouver, British Columbia	Prince George Spruce Kings (BCHL)	—
11	(United States)	Wyatt Bongiovanni (A)	Junior	F	6' 0" (1.83 m)	195 lb (88 kg)	1999-07-24	Birmingham, Michigan	Muskegon Lumberjacks (USHL)	—
12	(United States)	Daniel Winslow	Junior	F	5' 11" (1.8 m)	200 lb (91 kg)	1997-09-26	Fairfield, Connecticut	Jersey Hitmen (NCDC)	—
13	(Canada)	Christophe Fillion	Freshman	F	5' 10" (1.78 m)	175 lb (79 kg)	2000-06-18	Sherbrooke, Quebec	Muskegon Lumberjacks (USHL)	—
14	(Canada)	Ethan Leyh	Sophomore	F	6' 0" (1.83 m)	195 lb (88 kg)	2001-06-07	Anmore, British Columbia	Langley Rivermen (BCHL)	—
15	(Canada)	Jayden Lee	Sophomore	D	5' 9" (1.75 m)	155 lb (70 kg)	2001-01-10	North Vancouver, British Columbia	Powell River Kings (BCHL)	—
17	(United States)	Joey Cipollone	Sophomore	F	5' 11" (1.8 m)	185 lb (84 kg)	1999-07-12	Purchase, New York	Tri-City Storm (USHL)	—
18	(United States)	Corey Clifton	Freshman	F	5' 9" (1.75 m)	175 lb (79 kg)	1999-02-03	Matawan, New Jersey	Austin Bruins (NAHL)	—
19	(United States)	T. J. Friedmann	Junior	F	6' 2" (1.88 m)	180 lb (82 kg)	1998-02-27	St. Louis, Missouri	Victoria Grizzlies (BCHL)	—
20	(United States)	Matthew Fawcett	Sophomore	F	5' 6" (1.68 m)	148 lb (67 kg)	1999-04-22	Lincoln, Rhode Island	Powell River Kings (BCHL)	—
22	(United States)	Skyler Brind'Amour	Sophomore	F	6' 2" (1.88 m)	185 lb (84 kg)	1999-07-27	Raleigh, North Carolina	Chilliwack Chiefs (BCHL)	EDM, 177th overall 2017
23	(United States)	Zach Metsa	Junior	D	5' 9" (1.75 m)	180 lb (82 kg)	1998-10-19	Delafield, Wisconsin	Central Illinois Flying Aces (USHL)	—
24	(United States)	Logan Britt	Sophomore	D	6' 2" (1.88 m)	190 lb (86 kg)	1999-02-10	Crystal Lake, Illinois	Sioux Falls Stampede (USHL)	—
25	(Canada)	Tyler Ghirardosi	Freshman	F	6' 2" (1.88 m)	188 lb (85 kg)	1999-10-01	Montrose, British Columbia	Trail Smoke Eaters (BCHL)	—
26	(Netherlands)	Guus van Nes	Sophomore (RS)	F	6' 3" (1.91 m)	205 lb (93 kg)	1997-02-14	Hendrik-Ido-Ambacht, Netherlands	Boston Junior Bruins (NCDC)	—
27	(Canada)	Desi Burgart	Junior	F	6' 1" (1.85 m)	185 lb (84 kg)	1998-09-28	North Vancouver, British Columbia	Surrey Eagles (BCHL)	—
28	(United States)	Joe O'Connor	Senior	D	6' 3" (1.91 m)	215 lb (98 kg)	1996-03-16	Hamden, Connecticut	Brooks Bandits (AJHL)	—
29	(United States)	Odeen Tufto (C)	Senior	F	5' 7" (1.7 m)	175 lb (79 kg)	1997-01-09	Chaska, Minnesota	Sioux City Musketeers (USHL)	—
31	(United States)	Keith Petruzzelli	Senior	G	6' 5" (1.96 m)	185 lb (84 kg)	1999-02-09	Wilbraham, Massachusetts	Muskegon Lumberjacks (USHL)	DET, 88th overall 2017
33	(United States)	Josh Mayanja	Senior	G	6' 0" (1.83 m)	165 lb (75 kg)	1997-08-16	Framingham, Massachusetts	South Shore Kings (USPHL)	—
35	(United States)	Evan Fear	Sophomore	G	6' 2" (1.88 m)	188 lb (85 kg)	1999-07-05	Winnetka, Illinois	Waterloo Black Hawks (USHL)	—
96	(United States)	Ty Smilanic	Freshman	F	6' 1" (1.85 m)	178 lb (81 kg)	2002-01-20	Denver, Colorado	USNTDP (USHL)	FLA, 74th overall 2020

== Standings ==
2020–21 ECAC Hockey Standings
	Conference record											Overall record					
	GP	W	L	T	OTW	OTL	3/SW	PTS	PT%	GF	GA	GP	W	L	T	GF	GA
#11 Quinnipiac †	18	10	4	4	1	1	3	37	.685	54	34	29	17	8	4	100	59
#20 Clarkson	14	6	4	4	1	2	2	25	.595	29	25	22	11	7	4	62	52
St. Lawrence *	14	4	8	2	1	1	1	15	.357	30	37	17	6	8	3	40	45
Colgate	18	5	9	4	1	0	1	16	.352	34	51	22	6	11	5	48	66
Brown	0	-	-	-	-	-	-	-	-	-	-	0	-	-	-	-	-
Cornell	0	-	-	-	-	-	-	-	-	-	-	0	-	-	-	-	-
Dartmouth	0	-	-	-	-	-	-	-	-	-	-	0	-	-	-	-	-
Harvard	0	-	-	-	-	-	-	-	-	-	-	0	-	-	-	-	-
Princeton	0	-	-	-	-	-	-	-	-	-	-	0	-	-	-	-	-
Rensselaer	0	-	-	-	-	-	-	-	-	-	-	0	-	-	-	-	-
Union	0	-	-	-	-	-	-	-	-	-	-	0	-	-	-	-	-
Yale	0	-	-	-	-	-	-	-	-	-	-	0	-	-	-	-	-
Championship: March 20, 2021 † indicates conference regular season champion (Cleary Cup) * indicates conference tournament champion (Whitelaw Cup); Rankings: USCHO.com Top 20 Poll

== Schedule and results ==
Date	Time	Opponent^{#}	Rank^{#}	Site	TV	Decision	Result	Attendance	Record
Regular season
December 14	7:00 PM	vs. Sacred Heart*	#11	People's United Center • Hamden, Connecticut		Petruzzelli	W 9–2	0	1–0–0
December 15	7:00 PM	vs. Sacred Heart*	#11	People's United Center • Hamden, Connecticut		Petruzzelli	W 2–1 ^{OT}	0	2–0–0
December 18	7:00 PM	vs. #13 Bowling Green*	#11	People's United Center • Hamden, Connecticut		Petruzzelli	L 1–4	0	2–1–0
December 19	7:00 PM	vs. #13 Bowling Green*	#11	People's United Center • Hamden, Connecticut		Petruzzelli	L 2–4	0	2–2–0
December 22	7:00 PM	vs. Holy Cross*	#16	People's United Center • Hamden, Connecticut		Petruzzelli	W 6–1	0	3–2–0
December 23	5:05 PM	at Holy Cross*	#16	Hart Center • Worcester, Massachusetts		Petruzzelli	W 3–0	0	4–2–0
December 26	7:00 PM	vs. #19 American International*	#16	People's United Center • Hamden, Connecticut		Petruzzelli	W 8–3	0	5–2–0
December 27	3:05 PM	at #19 American International*	#16	MassMutual Center • Springfield, Massachusetts		Petruzzelli	W 3–2	0	6–2–0
December 31	4:00 PM	at St. Lawrence	#12	Appleton Arena • Canton, New York		Petruzzelli	T 2–2 ^{SOW}	0	6–2–1 (0–0–1)
January 3	1:00 PM	vs. St. Lawrence	#12	People's United Center • Hamden, Connecticut		Petruzzelli	L 2–4	0	6–3–1 (0–1–1)
January 8	7:00 PM	vs. #10 Clarkson	#13	People's United Center • Hamden, Connecticut		Petruzzelli	L 4–5 ^{OT}	0	6–4–1 (0–2–1)
January 9	7:00 PM	vs. #10 Clarkson	#13	People's United Center • Hamden, Connecticut		Petruzzelli	W 4–3 ^{OT}	0	7–4–1 (1–2–1)
January 10	4:00 PM	vs. #10 Clarkson	#13	People's United Center • Hamden, Connecticut		Petruzzelli	W 1–0	0	8–4–1 (2–2–1)
January 15	5:00 PM	at Colgate	#11	Class of 1965 Arena • Hamilton, New York		Petruzzelli	W 3–0	0	9–4–1 (3–2–1)
January 17	4:00 PM	vs. Colgate	#11	People's United Center • Hamden, Connecticut		Petruzzelli	W 3–0	0	10–4–1 (4–2–1)
January 22	5:00 PM	at #14 Clarkson	#10	Cheel Arena • Potsdam, New York		Petruzzelli	T 1–1 ^{SOW}	0	10–4–2 (4–2–2)
January 23	4:00 PM	at #14 Clarkson	#10	Cheel Arena • Potsdam, New York		Petruzzelli	T 1–1 ^{SOL}	0	10–4–3 (4–2–3)
January 24	4:00 PM	at #14 Clarkson	#10	Cheel Arena • Potsdam, New York		Petruzzelli	L 2–4	0	10–5–3 (4–3–3)
February 5	4:00 PM	vs. St. Lawrence	#12	People's United Center • Hamden, Connecticut		Petruzzelli	W 4–1	0	11–5–3 (5–3–3)
February 6	4:00 PM	vs. St. Lawrence	#12	People's United Center • Hamden, Connecticut		Petruzzelli	W 2–1	0	12–5–3 (6–3–3)
February 12	5:00 PM	at Colgate	#11	Class of 1965 Arena • Hamilton, New York		Petruzzelli	T 2–2 ^{SOW}	0	12–5–4 (6–3–4)
February 13	4:00 PM	at Colgate	#11	Class of 1965 Arena • Hamilton, New York		Petruzzelli	W 9–0	0	13–5–4 (7–3–4)
February 22	6:00 PM	vs. Long Island*	#12	People's United Center • Hamden, Connecticut		Petruzzelli	W 7–1	0	14–5–4
February 26	4:00 PM	at St. Lawrence	#12	Appleton Arena • Canton, New York		Petruzzelli	W 4–2	0	15–5–4 (8–3–4)
February 27	4:00 PM	at St. Lawrence	#12	Appleton Arena • Canton, New York		Petruzzelli	W 3–2	0	16–5–4 (9–3–4)
March 5	6:00 PM	vs. Colgate	#11	People's United Center • Hamden, Connecticut		Petruzzelli	W 4–2	0	17–5–4 (10–3–4)
March 6	4:00 PM	at Colgate	#11	Class of 1965 Arena • Hamilton, New York		Petruzzelli	L 3–4	0	17–6–4 (10–4–4)
ECAC Hockey Tournament
March 20	4:00 PM	vs. St. Lawrence*	#10	People's United Center • Hamden, Connecticut		Petruzzelli	L 2–3 ^{OT}	0	17–7–4
NCAA Tournament
March 27	2:00 PM	vs. #5 Minnesota State*	#11	Budweiser Events Center • Loveland, Colorado	ESPN3	Petruzzelli	L 3–4 ^{OT}	0	17–8–4
*Non-conference game. ^{#}Rankings from USCHO.com Poll. All times are in Eastern Time.

== Scoring statistics ==
Name	Position	Games	Goals	Assists	Points	PIM
Odeen Tufto	C	29	8	39	47	22
Ethan de Jong	RW	29	14	15	29	22
Zach Metsa	D	29	5	21	26	8
Ty Smilanic	C	29	14	7	21	10
Peter DiLiberatore	D	29	6	14	20	36
Desi Burgart	F	29	10	16	16	16
Michael Lombardi	F	26	5	11	16	0
Guus van Nes	LW/RW	29	2	13	15	12
Christophe Fillion	F	25	6	5	11	4
Skyler Brind'Amour	C	29	2	9	11	23
Ethan Leyh	F	25	3	7	10	10
Matthew Fawcett	F	21	4	5	9	0
Wyatt Bongiovanni	C	9	5	3	8	12
Ilvari Räsänen	D	25	1	7	8	19
Jayden Lee	D	23	2	5	7	6
Joey Cipollone	C	25	2	5	7	6
Nick Bochen	D	24	3	3	6	10
Logan Britt	D	27	2	3	5	14
T. J. Friedmann	F	25	3	0	3	35
Joe O'Connor	D	14	1	2	3	17
Marcus Chorney	D	28	1	2	3	32
C. J. McGee	D	19	1	0	1	12
Evan Fear	G	2	0	0	0	0
Yaniv Perets	G	2	0	0	0	0
Daniel Winslow	F	3	0	0	0	2
Josh Mayanja	G	4	0	0	0	0
Keith Petruzzelli	G	29	0	0	0	0
Bench	-	-	-	-	-	4
Total			100	182	282	338

== Goaltending statistics ==
Name	Games	Minutes	Wins	Losses	Ties	Goals against	Saves	Shut outs	SV %	GAA
Yaniv Perets	2	32	0	0	0	0	12	0	1.000	0.00
Josh Mayanja	4	15	0	0	0	0	12	0	1.000	0.00
Evan Fear	2	7:35	0	0	0	0	2	0	1.000	0.00
Keith Petruzzelli	29	1715	17	8	4	54	671	4	.926	1.89
Empty Net	-	12	-	-	-	5	-	-	-	-
Total	29	1783	17	8	4	59	697	5 ^{†}	.922	1.98

† Petruzzelli and Perets shared a shutout on February 13.

== Rankings ==
Poll	Week																					
Poll	Pre	1	2	3	4	5	6	7	8	9	10	11	12	13	14	15	16	17	18	19	20	21 (Final)
USCHO.com	13	13	12	11	11	11	16	12	13	11	10	11	12	11	12	12	11	12	10	11	-	12
USA Today	14	14	11	11	10	11	NR	13	12	11	10	11	11	11	11	11	10	11	10	10	11	11

USCHO did not release a poll in week 20.

== Awards and honors ==
Player	Award	Ref
Odeen Tufto	AHCA East First Team All-American	
Odeen Tufto	ECAC Hockey Player of the Year	
Keith Petruzelli	Ken Dryden Award	
Rand Pecknold	Tim Taylor Award	
Keith Petruzelli	ECAC Hockey First Team	
Zach Metsa	ECAC Hockey First Team	
Odeen Tufto	ECAC Hockey First Team	
Ty Smilanic	ECAC Hockey Rookie Team	

== Players drafted into the NHL ==
=== 2021 NHL entry draft ===
Round	Pick	Player	NHL team
7	223	Samuel Lipkin^{†}	Arizona Coyotes

† incoming freshman
