= 1931–32 United States collegiate men's ice hockey season =

- Duration: December 1931– March 1932
- East Collegiate champion: Harvard
- West Collegiate champion: Minnesota

The 1931–32 United States collegiate men's ice hockey season was the 38th season of collegiate ice hockey in the United States.

== Regular season ==
=== Standings ===
1931–32 Eastern Collegiate ice hockey standings
	Intercollegiate							Overall					
	GP	W	L	T	Pct.	GF	GA	GP	W	L	T	GF	GA
Amherst	–	–	–	–	–	–	–	4	0	4	0	–	–
Army	–	–	–	–	–	–	–	9	5	4	0	47	37
Bates	–	–	–	–	–	–	–	–	–	–	–	–	–
Boston University	10	6	4	0	.600	35	29	10	6	4	0	35	29
Bowdoin	–	–	–	–	–	–	–	8	1	7	0	–	–
Brown	–	–	–	–	–	–	–	11	5	6	0	–	–
Clarkson	3	2	1	0	.667	14	10	11	7	4	0	50	30
Colgate	–	–	–	–	–	–	–	2	0	2	0	–	–
Dartmouth	–	–	–	–	–	–	–	10	4	6	0	46	42
Hamilton	–	–	–	–	–	–	–	4	2	2	0	–	–
Harvard	–	–	–	–	–	–	–	14	11	1	2	–	–
Massachusetts State	–	–	–	–	–	–	–	4	3	1	0	–	–
Middlebury	–	–	–	–	–	–	–	6	4	2	0	–	–
MIT	–	–	–	–	–	–	–	10	4	6	0	–	–
New Hampshire	–	–	–	–	–	–	–	8	0	8	0	13	34
Northeastern	–	–	–	–	–	–	–	7	6	1	0	–	–
Princeton	–	–	–	–	–	–	–	18	13	4	1	–	–
St. John's	–	–	–	–	–	–	–	–	–	–	–	–	–
Union	–	–	–	–	–	–	–	2	0	2	0	–	–
Villanova	0	0	0	0	–	0	0	5	2	3	0	17	31
Williams	–	–	–	–	–	–	–	8	5	3	0	–	–
Yale	–	–	–	–	–	–	–	20	11	7	2	–	–

1931–32 Western Collegiate ice hockey standings
	Intercollegiate							Overall					
	GP	W	L	T	Pct.	GF	GA	GP	W	L	T	GF	GA
Marquette	5	2	2	1	.500	11	10	10	5	4	1	39	22
Michigan	8	4	3	1	.563	18	10	17	9	6	2	49	32
Michigan Tech	8	1	5	2	.250	13	36	13	5	6	2	37	47
Minnesota	9	7	1	1	.833	44	12	16	12	3	1	68	24
Minnesota–Duluth	0	0	0	0	–	0	0	7	2	5	0	11	18
North Dakota	–	–	–	–	–	–	–	1	1	0	0	–	–
St. Cloud State	6	1	5	0	.167	8	26	8	1	7	0	9	32
Wisconsin	2	0	2	0	.000	1	15	4	1	3	0	6	17

1931–32 Minnesota Intercollegiate Athletic Conference ice hockey standings
	Conference							Overall					
	GP	W	L	T	PTS	GF	GA	GP	W	L	T	GF	GA
Macalester †	–	–	–	–	–	–	–	–	–	–	–	–	–
Hamline †	–	–	–	–	–	–	–	–	–	–	–	–	–
Augsburg	–	–	–	–	–	–	–	–	–	–	–	–	–
Saint Mary's	–	–	–	–	–	–	–	–	–	–	–	–	–
St. Thomas	–	–	–	–	–	–	–	7	4	3	0	–	–
† indicates conference champion

1931–32 Pacific Coast Conference ice hockey standings
	Conference							Overall					
	GP	W	L	T	PTS	GF	GA	GP	W	L	T	GF	GA
California	–	–	–	–	–	–	–	–	–	–	–	–	–
Loyola	–	–	–	–	–	–	–	–	–	–	–	–	–
UCLA	–	–	–	–	–	–	–	–	–	–	–	–	–
USC	–	–	–	–	–	–	–	–	–	–	–	–	–
* indicates conference champion
