= 2020–21 Clarkson Golden Knights men's ice hockey season =

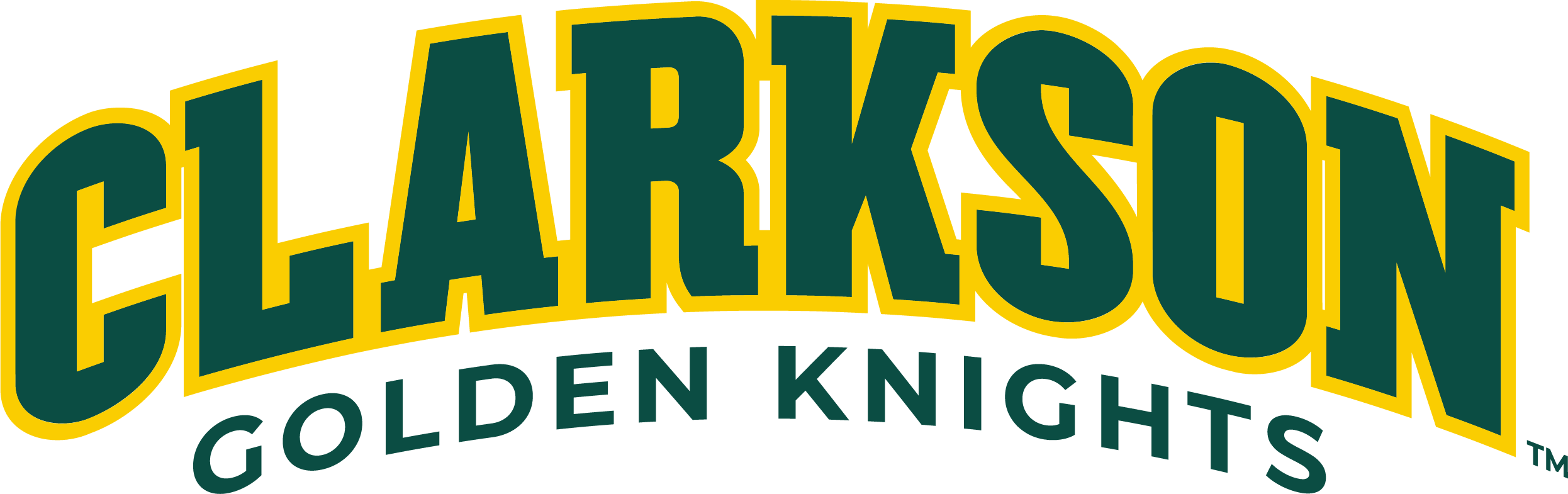
- Conference: 2nd ECAC Hockey
- Home ice: Cheel Arena

Rankings
- USCHO: 20
- USA Today: NR

Record
- Overall: 11–7–4
- Conference: 6–4–4
- Home: 4–3–3
- Road: 7–4–1
- Neutral: 0–0–0

Coaches and captains
- Head coach: Casey Jones
- Assistant coaches: Josh Hauge; Mike Towns; Andrew Mercer
- Captain(s): Zach Tsekos; Josh Dunne
- Alternate captain(s): Jack Jacome; Connor McCarthy

The 2020–21 Clarkson Golden Knights Men's ice hockey season was the 99th season of play for the program and the 60th season in the ECAC Hockey conference. The Golden Knights represented the Clarkson University and played their home games at Cheel Arena, and were coached by Casey Jones, in his 10th season.

== Season ==
As a result of the ongoing COVID-19 pandemic the entire college ice hockey season was delayed. Because the NCAA had previously announced that all winter sports athletes would retain whatever eligibility they possessed through at least the following year, none of Clarkson's players would lose a season of play. However, the NCAA also approved a change in its transfer regulations that would allow players to transfer and play immediately rather than having to sit out a season, as the rules previously required.

Clarkson was up and down all season, ending their non-conference schedule with just a 5–3 record despite playing mostly Atlantic Hockey teams. The offense began to sputter once the team began its conference slate but the goaltending was strong enough to keep them in most games. Clarkson ended the season in second place in the conference and was on the bubble to make the NCAA Tournament. Just as the team was getting ready to play in the ECAC Hockey Tournament, several team members gathered on campus, violating the school's COVID-19 protocols. As a result, the school ended the team's season and caused the Golden Knights to withdraw from postseason competition. While Clarkson wasn't the first team to end their season prematurely, they were the first ranked team to do so.

Chris Klack, Tommy Pasanen and Jordan Robert sat out the season.

== Departures ==
Player	Position	Nationality	Cause
Jere Astrén	Defenseman	Finland	Left program
Devin Brosseau	Forward	Canada	Graduation (signed with Bakersfield Condors)
Haralds Egle	Forward	Latvia	Graduation (signed with Manitoba Moose)
Shane Kuzmeski	Defenseman	United States	Graduation (signed with Wheeling Nailers)
Nicholas Latinovich	Goaltender	Canada	Left program
Frank Marotte	Goaltender	Canada	Graduation (signed with Allen Americans)
Greg Moro	Defenseman	Canada	Graduation (signed with Stockton Heat)
Jordan Schneider	Defenseman	Canada	Graduation
Adam Tisdale	Forward	Canada	Transferred to Sacred Heart

== Recruiting ==
Player	Position	Nationality	Age	Notes
Noah Beck	Defenseman	Canada	19	Richmond Hill, ON; Selected 194th overall in 2020
Alex Campbell	Forward	Canada	19	Châteauguay, QC; Selected 65th overall in 2019
Charlie Campbell	Forward	Canada	20	Châteauguay, QC
Ethan Haider	Goaltender	United States	19	Maple Grove, MN; Selected 148th overall in 2019
Luke Mobley	Forward	United States	20	St. Louis Park, MN
Jake Mucitelli	Goaltender	United States	20	Deerfield, NY
Tommy Pasanen	Defenseman	Germany	19	Schweinfurt, DEU
Jordan Power	Defenseman	Canada	19	Ottawa, ON
David Silye	Forward	Canada	21	Arnprior, ON
Kaelan Taylor	Defenseman	United States	21	Oceanside, CA
Nick Wicks	Forward	Canada	22	Delta, BC; transfer from Alaska Anchorage

== Roster ==
As of December 30, 2020.

No.	Nat.	Player	Class	Pos	Height	Weight	DoB	Hometown	Previous team	NHL rights
2	(Canada)	Connor McCarthy (A)	Senior	D	6' 7" (2.01 m)	238 lb (108 kg)	1996-05-07	LaSalle, Quebec	Chilliwack Chiefs (BCHL)	—
3	(United States)	Kaelan Taylor	Freshman	D	6' 2" (1.88 m)	185 lb (84 kg)	1999-01-03	Oceanside, California	Dubuque Fighting Saints (USHL)	—
4	(United States)	Brian Hurley	Junior	D	6' 0" (1.83 m)	216 lb (98 kg)	1998-06-18	Dellwood, Minnesota	Chicago Steel (USHL)	—
5	(United States)	Michael Underwood	Junior	D	6' 1" (1.85 m)	198 lb (90 kg)	1998-06-07	Bloomfield Hills, Michigan	Green Bay Gamblers (USHL)	—
6	(Canada)	Jack Jacome (A)	Senior	F	5' 7" (1.7 m)	163 lb (74 kg)	1998-12-07	Caledon, Ontario	Georgetown Raiders (OJHL)	—
8	(Canada)	Chris Klack	Junior	F	5' 9" (1.75 m)	174 lb (79 kg)	1997-06-03	Georgetown, Ontario	Penticton Vees (BCHL)	—
9	(Canada)	Jamie Collins	Junior	F	5' 7" (1.7 m)	158 lb (72 kg)	1997-09-21	Fergus, Ontario	Nanaimo Clippers (BCHL)	—
10	(Canada)	Nick Wicks	Sophomore	F	5' 9" (1.75 m)	170 lb (77 kg)	1998-04-24	Delta, British Columbia	Merritt Centennials (NAHL)	—
11	(Canada)	Alex Campbell	Freshman	F	5' 11" (1.8 m)	180 lb (82 kg)	2001-02-27	Châteauguay, Quebec	Omaha Lancers (USHL)	NSH, 65th overall 2019
12	(Canada)	David Silye	Freshman	F	5' 11" (1.8 m)	187 lb (85 kg)	1999-03-02	Arnprior, Ontario	Penticton Vees (BCHL)	—
13	(Canada)	Mathieu Gosselin	Sophomore	F	5' 10" (1.78 m)	168 lb (76 kg)	1999-05-18	Quebec City, Quebec	Merritt Centennials (BCHL)	—
14	(United States)	Luke Mobley	Freshman	F	6' 2" (1.88 m)	203 lb (92 kg)	1999-11-26	St. Louis Park, Minnesota	Omaha Lancers (USHL)	—
15	(United States)	John Carter MacLean	Senior	F	6' 1" (1.85 m)	206 lb (93 kg)	1997-02-27	Basking Ridge, New Jersey	Sioux City Musketeers (USHL)	—
16	(Germany)	Tommy Pasanen	Freshman	D	6' 4" (1.93 m)	218 lb (99 kg)	2001-07-30	Schweinfurt, Germany	Sioux City Musketeers (USHL)	—
17	(Canada)	Zach Tsekos (C)	Senior	F	5' 9" (1.75 m)	175 lb (79 kg)	1996-11-15	Montreal, Quebec	Sacred Heart (AHA)	—
18	(Canada)	Noah Beck	Freshman	F	6' 3" (1.91 m)	191 lb (87 kg)	2001-03-25	Richmond Hill, Ontario	Fargo Force (USHL)	STL, 194th overall 2020
19	(Canada)	Nick Campoli	Junior	F	5' 11" (1.8 m)	191 lb (87 kg)	1999-02-16	Toronto, Ontario	North York Rangers (OJHL)	VGK, 158th overall 2017
20	(Canada)	Charlie Campbell	Freshman	F	5' 10" (1.78 m)	163 lb (74 kg)	1999-12-01	Châteauguay, Quebec	Cornwall Colts (CCHL)	—
21	(United States)	Josh Dunne (C)	Junior	F	6' 4" (1.93 m)	210 lb (95 kg)	1998-12-08	O'Fallon, Missouri	Green Bay Gamblers (USHL)	—
23	(Canada)	Jordan Power	Freshman	D	6' 1" (1.85 m)	187 lb (85 kg)	2001-07-31	Ottawa, Ontario	Lincoln Stars (USHL)	—
26	(Canada)	Grant Cooper	Senior	F	6' 0" (1.83 m)	199 lb (90 kg)	1996-07-20	Cornwall, Ontario	Cornwall Colts (CCHL)	—
27	(Canada)	Dustyn McFaul	Sophomore	D	6' 2" (1.88 m)	191 lb (87 kg)	2000-08-04	Waterdown, Ontario	Pickering Panthers (OJHL)	BOS, 181st overall 2018
28	(United States)	Jordan Robert	Sophomore	F	5' 10" (1.78 m)	198 lb (90 kg)	1998-03-18	Massena, New York	Cowichan Valley Capitals (BCHL)	—
29	(Canada)	Anthony Romano	Sophomore	F	5' 11" (1.8 m)	185 lb (84 kg)	2000-10-07	Richmond Hill, Ontario	Sioux Falls Stampede (USHL)	ARI, 176th overall 2019
30	(United States)	Kris Oldham	Senior	G	6' 3" (1.91 m)	197 lb (89 kg)	1997-06-25	Anchorage, Alaska	Omaha (NCHC)	TBL, 153rd overall 2015
42	(United States)	Jacob Mucitelli	Freshman	G	6' 3" (1.91 m)	188 lb (85 kg)	2000-03-24	Deerfield, New York	Lincoln Stars (USHL)	—
44	(United States)	Anthony Callin	Sophomore	F	6' 0" (1.83 m)	206 lb (93 kg)	1998-12-23	Middleton, Wisconsin	Madison Capitols (USHL)	—
47	(United States)	Ethan Haider	Freshman	G	6' 3" (1.91 m)	209 lb (95 kg)	2001-09-04	Maple Grove, Minnesota	Sioux City Musketeers (USHL)	NSH, 148th overall 2019

== Standings ==
2020–21 ECAC Hockey Standings
	Conference record											Overall record					
	GP	W	L	T	OTW	OTL	3/SW	PTS	PT%	GF	GA	GP	W	L	T	GF	GA
#11 Quinnipiac †	18	10	4	4	1	1	3	37	.685	54	34	29	17	8	4	100	59
#20 Clarkson	14	6	4	4	1	2	2	25	.595	29	25	22	11	7	4	62	52
St. Lawrence *	14	4	8	2	1	1	1	15	.357	30	37	17	6	8	3	40	45
Colgate	18	5	9	4	1	0	1	16	.352	34	51	22	6	11	5	48	66
Brown	0	-	-	-	-	-	-	-	-	-	-	0	-	-	-	-	-
Cornell	0	-	-	-	-	-	-	-	-	-	-	0	-	-	-	-	-
Dartmouth	0	-	-	-	-	-	-	-	-	-	-	0	-	-	-	-	-
Harvard	0	-	-	-	-	-	-	-	-	-	-	0	-	-	-	-	-
Princeton	0	-	-	-	-	-	-	-	-	-	-	0	-	-	-	-	-
Rensselaer	0	-	-	-	-	-	-	-	-	-	-	0	-	-	-	-	-
Union	0	-	-	-	-	-	-	-	-	-	-	0	-	-	-	-	-
Yale	0	-	-	-	-	-	-	-	-	-	-	0	-	-	-	-	-
Championship: March 20, 2021 † indicates conference regular season champion (Cleary Cup) * indicates conference tournament champion (Whitelaw Cup); Rankings: USCHO.com Top 20 Poll

== Schedule and results ==
Date	Time	Opponent^{#}	Rank^{#}	Site	TV	Decision	Result	Attendance	Record
Regular season
November 22	4:00 PM	at Colgate*	#8	Class of 1965 Arena • Hamilton, New York		Oldham	W 2–1	0	1–0–0
November 27	5:00 PM	at RIT*	#9	Gene Polisseni Center • Henrietta, New York		Haider	L 5–8	0	1–1–0
November 29	5:00 PM	vs. RIT*	#9	Cheel Arena • Potsdam, New York		Oldham	W 5–1	0	2–1–0
December 9	5:00 PM	at Niagara*	#7	Dwyer Arena • Lewiston, New York		Oldham	L 1–4	0	2–2–0
December 12	5:00 PM	at Mercyhurst*	#7	Mercyhurst Ice Center • Erie, Pennsylvania		Oldham	W 4–3 ^{OT}	89	3–2–0
December 13	4:00 PM	at Mercyhurst*	#7	Mercyhurst Ice Center • Erie, Pennsylvania		Oldham	W 6–2	89	4–2–0
December 23	4:00 PM	vs. Colgate*	#8	Cheel Arena • Potsdam, New York		Haider	L 4–5 ^{OT}	0	4–3–0
December 29	5:00 PM	vs. Niagara*	#10	Cheel Arena • Potsdam, New York		Haider	W 6–3	0	5–3–0
January 1	6:45 PM	at Colgate	#10	Class of 1965 Arena • Hamilton, New York		Haider	W 4–1	0	6–3–0 (1–0–0)
January 3	4:00 PM	vs. Colgate	#10	Cheel Arena • Potsdam, New York		Haider	T 1–1 ^{SOL}	0	6–3–1 (1–0–1)
January 8	7:00 PM	at #13 Quinnipiac	#10	People's United Center • Hamden, Connecticut		Haider	W 5–4 ^{OT}	0	7–3–1 (2–0–1)
January 9	7:00 PM	at #13 Quinnipiac	#10	People's United Center • Hamden, Connecticut		Oldham	L 3–4 ^{OT}	0	7–4–1 (2–1–1)
January 10	4:00 PM	at #13 Quinnipiac	#10	People's United Center • Hamden, Connecticut		Haider	L 0–1	0	7–5–1 (2–2–1)
January 15	5:00 PM	vs. St. Lawrence	#13	Cheel Arena • Potsdam, New York		Haider	L 1–2 ^{OT}	0	7–6–1 (2–3–1)
January 17	4:00 PM	at St. Lawrence	#13	Appleton Arena • Canton, New York		Haider	W 2–1	0	8–6–1 (3–3–1)
January 22	5:00 PM	vs. #10 Quinnipiac	#14	Cheel Arena • Potsdam, New York		Haider	T 1–1 ^{SOL}	0	8–6–2 (3–3–2)
January 23	4:00 PM	vs. #10 Quinnipiac	#14	Cheel Arena • Potsdam, New York		Haider	T 1–1 ^{SOW}	0	8–6–3 (3–3–3)
January 24	4:00 PM	vs. #10 Quinnipiac	#14	Cheel Arena • Potsdam, New York		Haider	W 4–2	0	9–6–3 (4–3–3)
February 4	5:00 PM	vs. Colgate	#13	Cheel Arena • Potsdam, New York		Haider	L 0–2	0	9–7–3 (4–4–3)
February 6	5:00 PM	at Colgate	#13	Class of 1965 Arena • Hamilton, New York		Haider	T 1–1 ^{SOW}	0	9–7–4 (4–4–4)
February 26	5:00 PM	at Colgate	#15	Class of 1965 Arena • Hamilton, New York		Haider	W 3–2	0	10–7–4 (5–4–4)
February 28	4:00 PM	vs. Colgate	#15	Cheel Arena • Potsdam, New York		Haider	W 3–2	0	11–7–4 (6–4–4)
ECAC Hockey Tournament
Participation Cancelled
*Non-conference game. ^{#}Rankings from USCHO.com Poll. All times are in Eastern Time.

== Scoring statistics ==
Name	Position	Games	Goals	Assists	Points	PIM
Zack Tsekos	C	22	4	14	18	4
Anthony Callin	F	22	9	8	17	16
Alex Campbell	C/LW	22	4	13	17	2
Jack Jacome	RW	22	4	11	15	2
Anthony Romano	C/RW	22	9	5	14	10
Grant Cooper	LW	22	8	6	14	10
Mathieu Gosselin	RW	22	6	6	12	20
Connor McCarthy	D	22	3	5	8	12
Luke Mobley	F	22	3	5	8	6
Nick Campoli	C	22	3	2	5	21
John Dunne	C	14	2	3	5	26
Jordan Power	D	22	1	3	4	8
Nick Wicks	F	12	1	2	3	0
Jamie Collins	F	16	1	2	3	6
Brian Hurley	D	20	1	2	3	2
Michael Underwood	D	22	1	2	3	26
David Silye	C	17	0	3	3	6
Dustyn McFaul	D	19	0	3	3	19
Noah Beck	D	20	1	1	2	8
Charlie Campbell	F	6	1	0	1	0
Kaelan Taylor	D	21	0	1	1	8
Jacob Mucitelli	G	1	0	0	0	0
John Carter MacLean	C	8	0	0	0	2
Kris Oldham	G	8	0	0	0	0
Ethan Haider	G	16	0	0	0	0
Bench	-	-	-	-	-	4
Total			62	95	157	220

== Goaltending statistics ==
Name	Games	Minutes	Wins	Losses	Ties	Goals against	Saves	Shut outs	SV %	GAA
Ethan Haider	16	960	7	5	4	32	373	0	.921	2.00
Kris Oldham	8	379	4	2	0	18	172	0	.905	2.85
Jacob Mucitelli	1	8	0	0	0	1	4	0	.800	7.00
Empty Net	-	5	-	-	-	1	-	-	-	-
Total	22	1353	11	7	5	52	549	0	.913	2.31

== Rankings ==
Poll	Week																					
Poll	Pre	1	2	3	4	5	6	7	8	9	10	11	12	13	14	15	16	17	18	19	20	21 (Final)
USCHO.com	8	8	9	9	7	7	8	10	10	13	14	12	13	14	13	15	14	14	18	20	-	20
USA Today	8	8	9	8	7	8	9	12	10	12	14	14	13	15	13	13	14	14	NR	NR	NR	NR

USCHO did not release a poll in week 20.

== Awards and honors ==
Player	Award	Ref
Zach Tsekos	ECAC Hockey Best Defensive Forward	
Ethan Haider	ECAC Hockey Rookie of the Year	
Connor McCarthy	ECAC Hockey First Team	
Zach Tsekos	ECAC Hockey First Team	
Ethan Haider	ECAC Hockey Rookie Team	

== Players drafted into the NHL ==
=== 2021 NHL entry draft ===
Round	Pick	Player	NHL team
3	73	Ayrton Martino^{†}	Dallas Stars

† incoming freshman
