= If a tree falls in a forest and no one is around to hear it, does it make a sound? =

Philosophical thought experiment

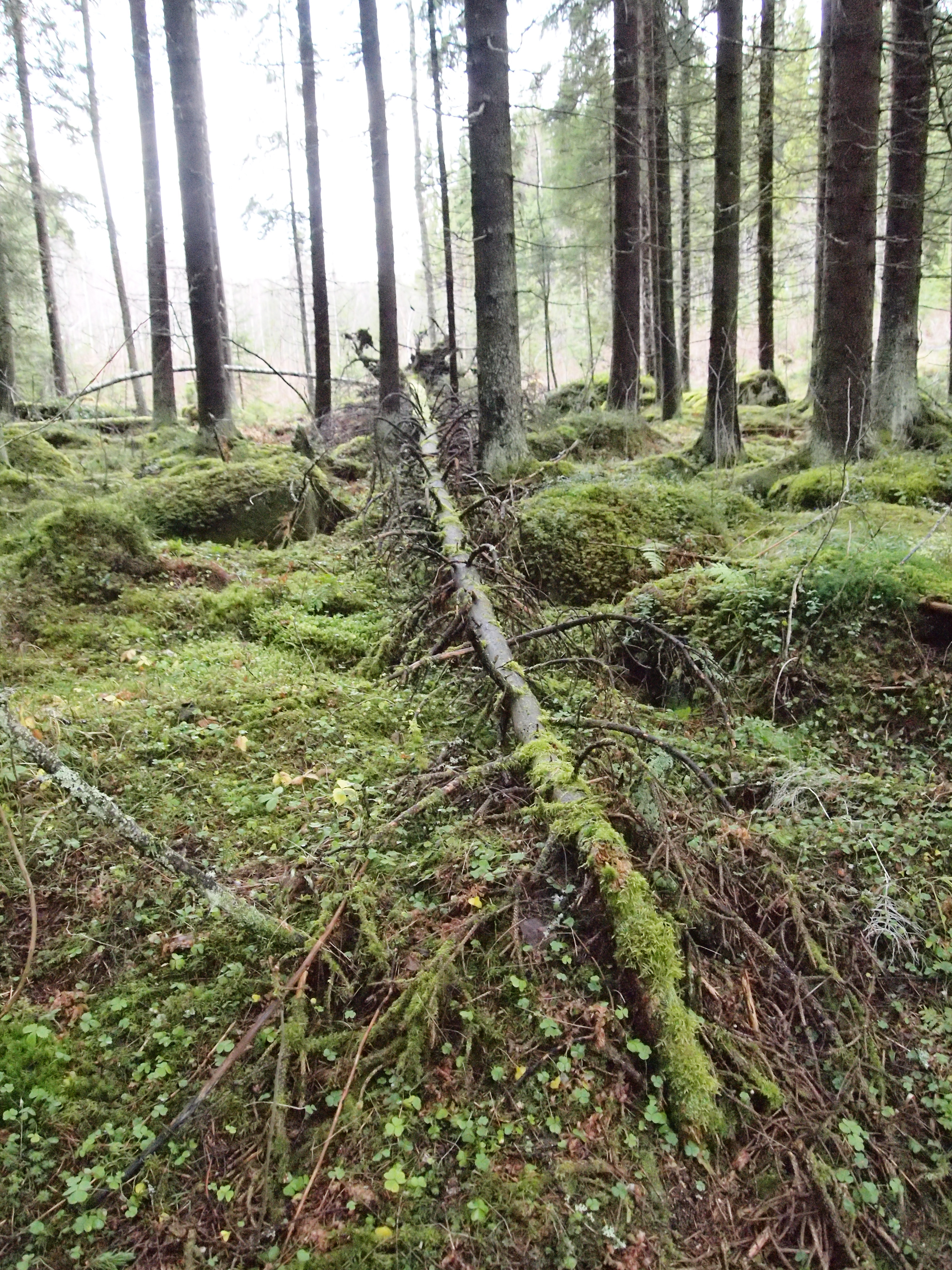
A fallen tree in a forest

"If a tree falls in a forest and no one is around to hear it, does it make a sound?" is a philosophical thought experiment that raises questions regarding observation and perception.

== History ==
While the origin of the phrase is sometimes mistakenly attributed to George Berkeley, there are no extant writings in which he discussed this question. The closest are the following two passages from Berkeley's A Treatise Concerning the Principles of Human Knowledge, published in 1710:

But, say you, surely there is nothing easier than for me to imagine trees, for instance, in a park, or books existing in a closet, and nobody by to perceive them.

The objects of sense exist only when they are perceived; the trees therefore are in the garden... no longer than while there is somebody by to perceive them.

Despite these passages bearing a distant resemblance to the question, Berkeley never proposed the question itself. However, his work dealt extensively with the question of whether objects could continue to exist without being perceived.

In June 1883, in the magazine The Chautauquan, the question was asked, "If a tree were to fall on an island where there were no human beings would there be any sound?" They then went on to answer the query with, "No. Sound is the sensation excited in the ear when the air or other medium is set in motion." The magazine Scientific American corroborated the technical aspect of this question, while leaving out the philosophical side, a year later when they asked the question slightly reworded, "If a tree were to fall on an uninhabited island, would there be any sound?" And gave a more technical answer, "Sound is vibration, transmitted to our senses through the mechanism of the ear, and recognized as sound only at our nerve centers. The falling of the tree or any other disturbance will produce vibration of the air. If there be no ears to hear, there will be no sound."

The current phrasing appears to have originated in the 1910 book Physics by Charles Riborg Mann and George Ransom Twiss. The question "When a tree falls in a lonely forest, and no animal is near by to hear it, does it make a sound? Why?" is posed along with many other questions to quiz readers on the contents of the chapter, and as such, is posed from a purely physical point of view.

While physicists and good friends Albert Einstein and Niels Bohr were equally instrumental in founding quantum mechanics, the two had very different views on what quantum mechanics said about reality. On one of many daily lunchtime walks with fellow physicist Abraham Pais, who like Einstein was a close friend and associate of Bohr, Einstein suddenly stopped, turned to Pais, and asked: "Do you really believe that the moon only exists if you look at it?" As recorded on the first page of Subtle Is the Lord, Pais' biography of Einstein, Pais responded to the effect of: 'The twentieth century physicist does not, of course, claim to have the definitive answer to this question.' Pais' answer was representative not just of himself and of Bohr, but of the majority of quantum physicists of that time, a situation that over time led to Einstein's effective exclusion from the very group he helped found. As Pais indicated, the majority view of the quantum mechanics community then and arguably to this day is that existence in the absence of an observer is at best a conjecture, a conclusion that can neither be proven nor disproven.

== Metaphysics ==
=== Possibility of unperceived existence ===
Can something exist without being perceived by consciousness? – e.g. "is sound only sound if a person hears it?"

The most immediate philosophical topic that the riddle introduces involves the existence of the tree (and the sound it produces) outside of human perception. If no one is around to see, hear, touch or smell the tree, how could it be said to exist? What is it to say that it exists when such an existence is unknown? Of course, from a scientific viewpoint, it exists. It is human beings that are able to perceive it. George Berkeley in the 18th century developed subjective idealism, a metaphysical theory to respond to these questions, coined famously as "to be is to be perceived". Today, meta-physicists are split. According to substance theory, a substance is distinct from its properties, while according to bundle theory, an object is merely its sense data. The definition of sound, simplified, is a hearable noise. The tree will make a sound, even if nobody heard it, simply because it could have been heard.

The answer to this question depends on the definition of sound. We can define sound as our perception of air vibrations. Therefore, sound does not exist if we do not hear it. When a tree falls, the motion disturbs the air and sends off air waves. This physical phenomenon, which can be measured by instruments other than our ears, exists regardless of human perception (seeing or hearing) of it. Putting these lines of thought together, we can say that although the tree falling on the island sends off air waves, it does not produce sound if no human is within the distance where the air waves are strong enough for a human to perceive them. However, if we define sound as the waves themselves, then sound would be produced.

This all leaves out sounds heard from imagination, hallucination, synesthesia, and tinnitus. These phenomena prove that sound is virtualized reality since these all exist without vibration in the air.

The same applies to all other senses that produce perceptions. Odor and flavor do not exist. They are virtualizations of chemicals detected by olfactory and gustatory sensors. Texture doesn’t exist. It is a virtualization of pressure differentiation much like sound is a virtualization of pressure differences in the air.

=== Knowledge of the unobserved world ===
Can we assume the unobserved world functions the same as the observed world? – e.g. "does observation affect outcome?"

A similar question does not involve whether or not an unobserved event occurs predictably, like it occurs when it is observed. The anthropic principle suggests that the observer, just in its existence, may impose on the reality observed.

However, most people, as well as scientists, assume that the observer doesn't change whether the tree-fall causes a sound or not, but this is an impossible claim to prove. However, many scientists would argue that a truly unobserved event is one which realises no effect (imparts no information) on any other (where 'other' might be e.g., human, sound-recorder or rock), it therefore can have no legacy in the present (or ongoing) wider physical universe. It may then be recognized that the unobserved event was absolutely identical to an event which did not occur at all. Of course, the fact that the tree is known to have changed state from 'upright' to 'fallen' implies that the event must be observed to ask the question at all – even if only by the supposed deaf onlooker. The British philosopher of science Roy Bhaskar, credited with developing critical realism has argued, in apparent reference to this riddle, that:

If men ceased to exist sound would continue to travel and heavy bodies to fall to the earth in exactly the same way, though ex hypothesi there would be no-one to know it

This existence of an unobserved real is integral to Bhaskar's ontology, which contends (in opposition to the various strains of positivism which have dominated both natural and social science in the twentieth century) that 'real structures exist independently of and are often out of phase with the actual patterns of events'. In social science, this has made his approach popular amongst contemporary Marxists — notably Alex Callinicos – who postulate the existence of real social forces and structures which might not always be observable.

=== Dissimilarity between sensation and reality ===
What is the difference between what something is, and how it appears? – e.g. "sound is the VIRTUALIZATION of the variation of pressure that propagates through matter as a wave"

Pressure waves exist. Sound is the virtualization of that pressure variation. An easier example to understand is that odor and flavor are virtualizations of particular chemical compounds. Color is a virtualization of light. Texture and temperature are virtualizations of pressure and heat. Pain is a virtualization of physical damage. All of these cases have phantom/hallucinated versions which are virtualizations originating from other areas of the brain than the standard origin of the afferent peripheral nervous system: the senses.

Perhaps the most important topic the riddle offers is the division between perception of an object and how an object really is. If a tree exists outside of perception, then there is no way for us to know that the tree exists. So then, what do we mean by 'existence'; what is the difference between perception and reality? Also, people may also say, if the tree exists outside of perception (as common sense would dictate), then it will produce sound waves. However, these sound waves will not actually sound like anything. Sound as it is mechanically understood will occur, but sound as it is understood by sensation will not occur. So then, how is it known that 'sound as it is mechanically understood' will occur if that sound is not perceived?

== Phrasal templating ==
The question of if a tree falls in a forest has been used as a phrasal template, for example in Ken Robinson's TED talk in 2006:

I saw a great T-shirt recently which said, “If a man speaks his mind in a forest, and no woman hears him, is he still wrong?”.

== See also ==
- Counterfactual definiteness
- Descartes' dream argument
- Epistemology
- Object (philosophy)
- Object permanence
- Observer effect (physics)
- Kōan
- Ontology
- Schrödinger's cat
- Principle of locality
