= Casey Jones (ice hockey) =

Canadian ice hockey coach

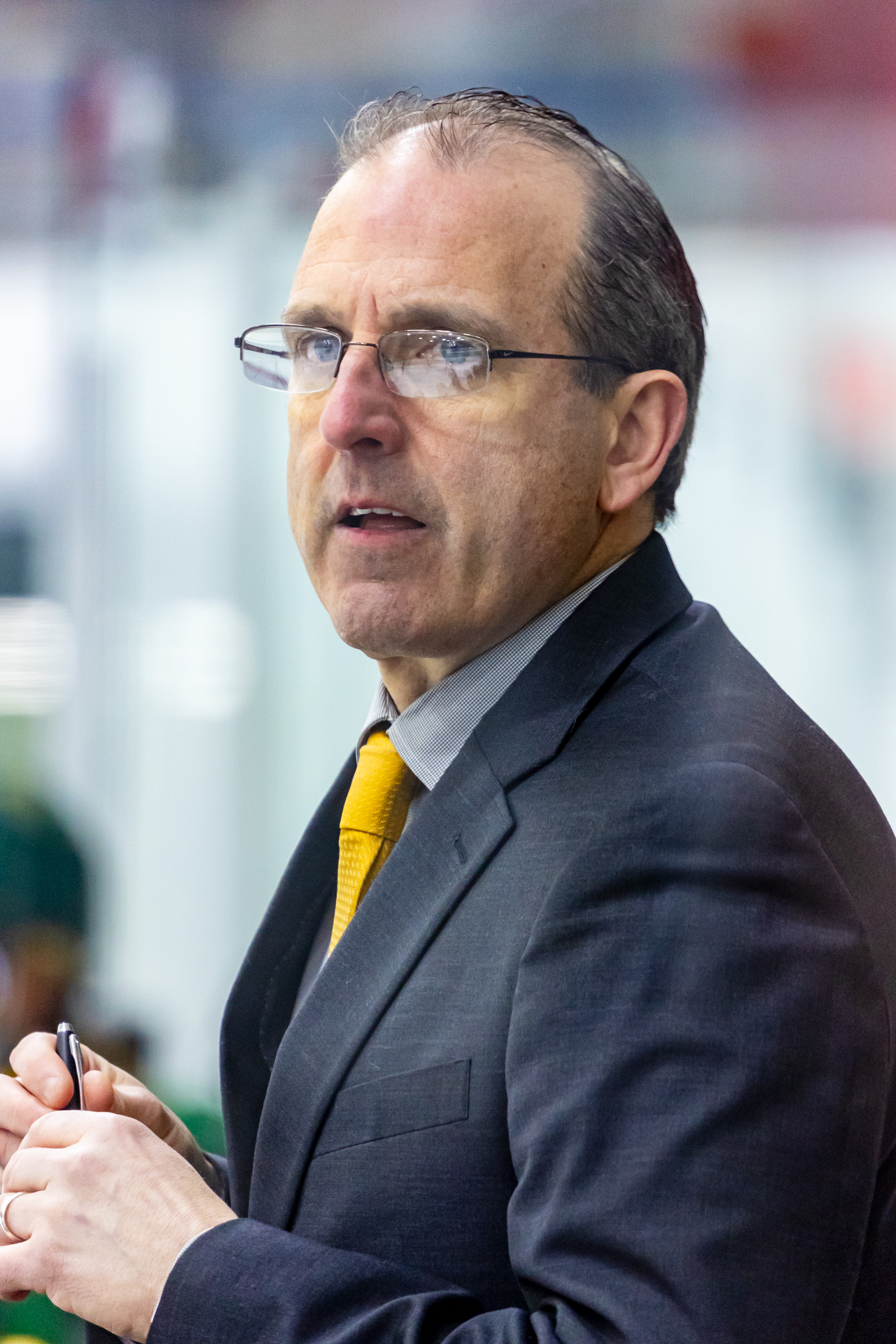

Current position
- Title: Head coach
- Team: Cornell
- Conference: ECAC Hockey
- Record: 22–11–1 (.662)

Biographical details
- Born: May 30, 1968 (age 58); Témiscaming, Quebec, Canada

Playing career
- 1986–1990: Cornell
- Position: Center

Coaching career (HC unless noted)
- 1991–1993: Cornell (assistant)
- 1993–1995: Clarkson (assistant)
- 1995–2008: Ohio State (assistant and associate head coach)
- 2008–2011: Cornell (associate head coach)
- 2011–2024: Clarkson
- 2024–2025: Cornell (associate, head-coach in waiting)
- 2025–present: Cornell

Head coaching record
- Overall: 256–196–57 (.559)
- Tournaments: 0–3 (.000)

Accomplishments and honors

Championships
- 2019 ECAC Tournament champion

Casey Jones (born May 30, 1968) is a Canadian ice hockey coach. He is currently the head coach for the Cornell University men's hockey team. He previously was the head coach at Clarkson, a position he held from 2011–12 until 2023–24. Jones spent 20 years as an assistant coach before landing his first head coaching job, replacing George Roll at one of his former stops. Jones was born in Témiscaming, Quebec, Canada.

On June 13, 2024, it was announced that Jones would be joining Cornell University as an assistant coach, and would assume the head coaching role for the 2025–2026 season following the retirement of Mike Schafer.

== Career statistics ==
| | | | Regular season | | | | | Playoffs |
| Season | Team | League | GP | G | A | Pts | PIM | GP | G | A | Pts | PIM |
|---|---|---|---|---|---|---|---|---|---|---|---|---|
| 1986–87 | Cornell | ECAC Hockey | 27 | 6 | 12 | 18 | 38 | — | — | — | — | — |
| 1987–88 | Cornell | ECAC Hockey | 27 | 10 | 22 | 32 | 26 | — | — | — | — | — |
| 1988–89 | Cornell | ECAC Hockey | 29 | 8 | 27 | 35 | 22 | — | — | — | — | — |
| 1989–90 | Cornell | ECAC Hockey | 27 | 6 | 21 | 27 | 22 | — | — | — | — | — |
| NCAA totals | | | 110 | 30 | 82 | 112 | 108 | — | — | — | — | — |

== Head coaching record ==
Record table
| Season | Team | Overall | Conference | Standing | Postseason |
|---|---|---|---|---|---|
Clarkson Golden Knights (ECAC Hockey) (2011–2024)
| 2011–12 | Clarkson | 16–17–6 | 9–9–4 | T–6th | ECAC First Round |
| 2012–13 | Clarkson | 9–20–7 | 8–11–3 | T–9th | ECAC First Round |
| 2013–14 | Clarkson | 21–17–4 | 11–9–2 | T–5th | ECAC Quarterfinals |
| 2014–15 | Clarkson | 12–20–5 | 8–11–3 | 8th | ECAC First Round |
| 2015–16 | Clarkson | 20–15–3 | 10–9–3 | T–5th | ECAC Quarterfinals |
| 2016–17 | Clarkson | 18–16–5 | 10–9–3 | 6th | ECAC Quarterfinals |
| 2017–18 | Clarkson | 23–11–6 | 12–5–5 | 3rd | NCAA East Regional Semifinals |
| 2018–19 | Clarkson | 26–11–2 | 13–7–2 | T–3rd | NCAA Northeast Regional Semifinals |
| 2019–20 | Clarkson | 23–8–3 | 16–5–1 | 2nd | Tournament Cancelled |
| 2020–21 | Clarkson | 11–7–4 | 6–4–4 | 2nd | Participation Cancelled |
| 2021–22 | Clarkson | 21–10–6 | 14–4–4 | 2nd | ECAC Semifinals |
| 2022–23 | Clarkson | 16–17–4 | 9–10–3 | 6th | ECAC Quarterfinals |
| 2023–24 | Clarkson | 18–16–1 | 12–9–1 | 5th | ECAC First Round |
| Clarkson: | | 234–185–56 (.552) | 138–102–38 (.565) | | |
Cornell Big Red (ECAC Hockey) (2025–present)
| 2025–26 | Cornell | 22–11–1 | 15–6–1 | T–2nd | NCAA Loveland Regional Semifinals |
| Cornell: | | 22–11–1 (.662) | 15–6–1 (.705) | | |
| Total: | | 256–196–57 (.559) | | | |
National champion Postseason invitational champion Conference regular season champion Conference regular season and conference tournament champion Division regular season champion Division regular season and conference tournament champion Conference tournament champion

Awards and achievements
| Preceded by Mike Schafer | Tim Taylor Award; 2018–19 | Succeeded by Mike Schafer |
