= 2019–20 Cornell Big Red men's ice hockey season =

Collegiate ice hockey season

ECAC Regular Season Champion
- Conference: ECAC Hockey
- Home ice: Lynah Rink

Rankings
- USCHO: 1
- USA Today: 1

Record
- Overall: 23–2–4
- Conference: 18–2–2
- Home: 11–0–2
- Road: 10–2–1
- Neutral: 2–0–1

Coaches and captains
- Head coach: Mike Schafer
- Assistant coaches: Ben Syer; Sean Flanagan; Mitch Stephens
- Captain(s): Morgan Barron; Yanni Kaldis; Jeff Malott

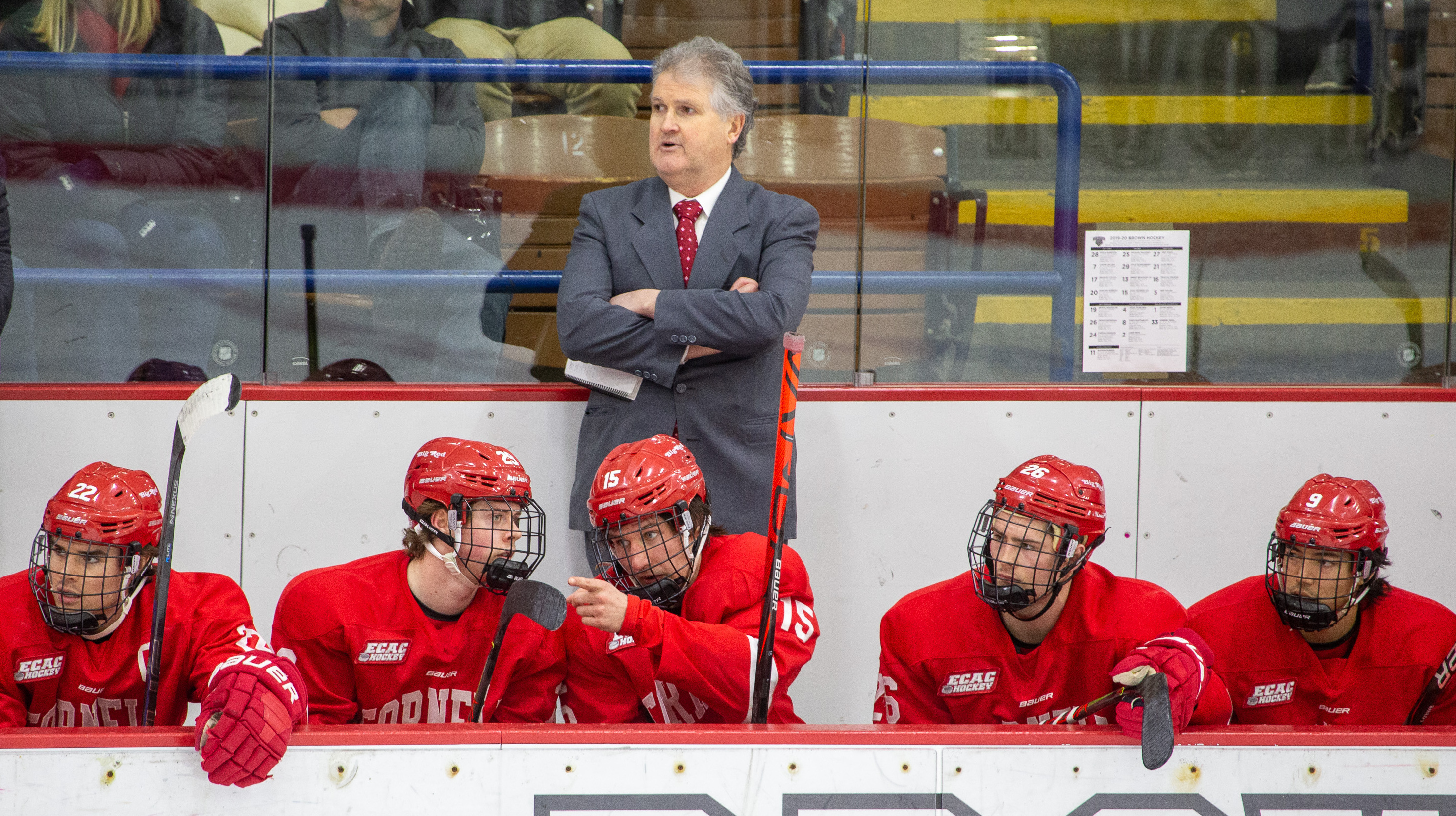
Mike Schafer and players in February 2020

The 2019-20 Cornell Big Red Men's ice hockey season was the 104th season of play for the program and the 59th season in the ECAC Hockey conference. The Big Red represented the Cornell University and played their home games at Lynah Rink, and were coached by Mike Schafer, in his 25th season as their head coach.

== Season ==
The season was ultimately cut short by the coronavirus pandemic but Cornell finished their 29-game regular season schedule with an overall record of 23-2-4 and a record of 18-2-2 in the ECAC Hockey conference. Cornell finished the ECAC season in sole possession of first place thus winning the Cleary Cup for the third straight year and was the number one seed in the ECAC Hockey tournament which was ultimately canceled before the quarterfinal round began. Cornell also won the Ivy League championship for the third straight year.

Coach Schafer was named the co-winner of the Spencer Penrose Award as Division 1 Coach of the Year with Brad Berry of the University of North Dakota. He was also named ECAC Hockey Coach of Year, winning the Tim Taylor Award for a record setting fifth time, as well as being named Ivy League Coach of the Year for the third time.

Cornell finished the truncated season atop both the USCHO and USA Today polls.

== Departures ==
Player	Position	Nationality	Cause
Chase Brakel	Forward	Canada	Returned to Juniors (Portage Terriers)
Alec McCrea	Defenseman	United States	Graduation (Signed with Grand Rapids Griffins)
Connor Murphy	Forward	Canada	Left Program
Matt Nuttle	Defenseman	United States	Graduation (Signed with South Carolina Stingrays)
Brendan Smith	Defenseman	United States	Graduation (Signed with Wichita Thunder)
Beau Starrett	Forward	United States	Graduation (Signed with Bakersfield Condors)
Mitchell Vanderlaan	Forward	Canada	Graduation (signed with South Carolina Stingrays)

== Recruiting ==
Player	Position	Nationality	Age	Notes
Ben Berard	Forward	Canada	20	Duncan, BC
Sebastian Dirven	Defenseman	Canada	21	Bainsville, ON
Sam Malinski	Defenseman	United States	21	Lakeville, MN
Jack Malone	Forward	United States	19	Danville, CA; Selected 180th overall in 2019 NHL entry draft
Travis Mitchell	Defenseman	United States	20	South Lyon, MI
Peter Muzyka	Defenseman	Canada	19	Toronto, ON
Matt Stienburg	Forward	Canada	19	Halifax, NS; Selected 63rd overall in 2019 NHL entry draft
Ben Tupker	Forward	Canada	19	Collingwood, ON
Zach Tupker	Forward	Canada	19	Collingwood, ON

== Roster ==
As of November 26, 2019.

No.	Nat.	Player	Class	Pos	Height	Weight	DoB	Hometown	Previous team	NHL rights
2	(Canada)	Peter Muzyka	Freshman	D	6' 3" (1.91 m)	190 lb (86 kg)	2000-05-14	Toronto, Ontario	Penticton Vees (BCHL)	—
3	(United States)	Cody Haiskanen	Junior	D	6' 4" (1.93 m)	198 lb (90 kg)	1997-03-27	Fargo, North Dakota	Fargo Force (USHL)	—
4	(Canada)	Joe Leahy	Sophomore	D	6' 4" (1.93 m)	192 lb (87 kg)	1997-04-29	Waterloo, Ontario	Salmon Arm Silverbacks (BCHL)	—
5	(Canada)	Sebastian Dirven	Freshman	D	6' 3" (1.91 m)	196 lb (89 kg)	1998-06-22	Bainsville, Ontario	Central Illinois Flying Aces (USHL)	—
6	(United States)	Alex Green	Junior	D	6' 2" (1.88 m)	193 lb (88 kg)	1998-06-18	Chicago, Illinois	Lincoln Stars (USHL)	TBL, 121st overall 2018
7	(United States)	Cam Donaldson	Junior	F	5' 8" (1.73 m)	169 lb (77 kg)	1998-07-14	Pittsboro, North Carolina	Powell River Kings (BCHL)	—
8	(Canada)	Yanni Kaldis (C)	Senior	D	5' 11" (1.8 m)	191 lb (87 kg)	1995-09-30	Montréal, Québec	Nanaimo Clippers (BCHL)	—
9	(Canada)	Noah Bauld	Senior	F	5' 11" (1.8 m)	185 lb (84 kg)	1997-01-02	Halifax, Nova Scotia	Lloydminster Bobcats (AJHL)	—
10	(United States)	Travis Mitchell	Freshman	D	6' 3" (1.91 m)	201 lb (91 kg)	1999-11-25	South Lyon, Michigan	Omaha Lancers (USHL)	—
11	(Canada)	Kyle Betts	Junior	F	6' 1" (1.85 m)	182 lb (83 kg)	1997-09-17	Flesherton, Ontario	Powell River Kings (BCHL)	—
13	(United States)	Jack Malone	Freshman	F	6' 1" (1.85 m)	190 lb (86 kg)	2000-10-13	Madison, New Jersey	Youngstown Phantoms (USHL)	VAN, 180th overall 2019
14	(Canada)	Ben Tupker	Freshman	F	6' 3" (1.91 m)	191 lb (87 kg)	1999-12-23	Collingwood, Ontario	Carleton Place Canadians (CCHL)	—
15	(Russia)	Max Andreev	Sophomore	F	6' 0" (1.83 m)	184 lb (83 kg)	1998-10-22	Moscow, Russia	Central Illinois Flying Aces (USHL)	—
16	(Canada)	Matt Cairns	Junior	D	6' 3" (1.91 m)	213 lb (97 kg)	1998-04-27	Mississauga, Ontario	Powell River Kings (BCHL)	EDM, 84th overall 2016
17	(Canada)	Zach Bramwell	Sophomore	F	6' 1" (1.85 m)	192 lb (87 kg)	1999-05-09	Hamilton, Ontario	Oakville Blades (OJHL)	—
18	(China)	Andong Song	Sophomore	D	6' 1" (1.85 m)	183 lb (83 kg)	1997-01-31	Beijing, China	Madison Capitols (USHL)	NYI, 172nd overall 2015
19	(Canada)	Michael Regush	Sophomore	F	6' 1" (1.85 m)	211 lb (96 kg)	1998-09-12	Surrey, British Columbia	Youngstown Phantoms (USHL)	—
20	(Canada)	Matt Stienburg	Freshman	F	6' 2" (1.88 m)	186 lb (84 kg)	2000-10-07	Halifax, Nova Scotia	St. Andrew's College (CDNHS)	COL, 63rd overall 2019
21	(Canada)	Zach Tupker	Freshman	F	6' 1" (1.85 m)	187 lb (85 kg)	1999-12-23	Collingwood, Ontario	Carleton Place Canadians (CCHL)	—
22	(Canada)	Jeff Malott (C)	Senior	F	6' 3" (1.91 m)	204 lb (93 kg)	1996-08-07	Burlington, Ontario	Brooks Bandits (AJHL)	—
23	(Canada)	Liam Motley	Sophomore	F	6' 3" (1.91 m)	203 lb (92 kg)	1997-05-08	Calgary, Alberta	Whitecourt Wolverines (AJHL)	—
24	(United States)	Sam Malinski	Freshman	D	5' 11" (1.8 m)	190 lb (86 kg)	1998-07-27	Lakeville, Minnesota	Bismarck Bobcats (NAHL)	—
26	(Canada)	Tristan Mullin	Junior	F	6' 2" (1.88 m)	196 lb (89 kg)	1996-09-10	Cartwright, Manitoba	Powell River Kings (BCHL)	—
27	(Canada)	Morgan Barron (C)	Junior	F	6' 3" (1.91 m)	217 lb (98 kg)	1998-07-27	Halifax, Nova Scotia	St. Andrew's College (CDNHS)	NYR, 174th overall 2017
28	(Canada)	Brenden Locke	Junior	F	5' 10" (1.78 m)	177 lb (80 kg)	1997-10-09	Iroquois Falls, Ontario	Cobourg Cougars (OJHL)	—
29	(Canada)	Ben Berard	Freshman	F	6' 0" (1.83 m)	192 lb (87 kg)	1999-02-13	Duncan, British Columbia	Powell River Kings (BCHL)	—
32	(Canada)	Austin McGrath	Junior	G	6' 1" (1.85 m)	179 lb (81 kg)	1998-02-10	Lloydminster, Alberta	Lloydminster Bobcats (AJHL)	—
33	(Canada)	Nate McDonald	Sophomore	G	6' 2" (1.88 m)	181 lb (82 kg)	1999-08-11	North Bay, Ontario	Markham Royals (OJHL)	—
35	(Canada)	Matthew Galajda	Junior	G	6' 0" (1.83 m)	192 lb (87 kg)	1997-10-07	Aurora, Ontario	Victoria Grizzlies (BCHL)	—

== Standings ==
2019–20 ECAC Hockey Standings
	Conference record							Overall record					
	GP	W	L	T	PTS	GF	GA	GP	W	L	T	GF	GA
#1 Cornell †	22	18	2	2	38	81	34	29	23	2	4	104	45
#7 Clarkson	22	16	5	1	33	63	38	34	23	8	3	96	63
#14 Quinnipiac	22	14	6	2	30	64	45	34	21	11	2	94	78
Rensselaer	22	13	8	1	27	63	41	34	17	15	2	95	87
Harvard	22	11	6	5	27	82	59	31	15	10	6	116	87
Dartmouth	22	10	10	2	22	60	73	31	13	14	4	93	106
Yale	22	10	10	2	22	57	64	32	15	15	2	77	97
Colgate	22	8	9	5	21	50	54	36	12	16	8	76	87
Brown	22	8	12	2	18	41	54	31	8	21	2	52	84
Union	22	5	15	2	12	46	71	37	8	25	4	67	112
Princeton	22	2	16	4	8	46	71	31	6	20	5	66	100
St. Lawrence	22	2	18	2	6	37	81	36	4	27	5	64	130
Championship: March 21, 2020 † indicates conference regular season champion (Cleary Cup) * indicates conference tournament champion (Whitelaw Cup); Rankings: USCHO.com Top 20 Poll; updated March 23, 2020

== Schedule and results ==
Date	Time	Opponent^{#}	Rank^{#}	Site	TV	Decision	Result	Attendance	Record
Exhibition
October 20	2:02 PM	vs. Nipissing*	#5	Lynah Rink • Ithaca, New York (Exhibition)		McGrath	W 6–2	2,784	
October 26	7:02 PM	vs. USNTDP*	#4	Lynah Rink • Ithaca, New York (Exhibition)		Galajda	W 3–0	4,117	
Regular season
November 1	7:05 PM	at Michigan State*	#4	Munn Ice Arena • East Lansing, Michigan		Galajda	W 3–2	5,203	1–0–0
November 2	7:05 PM	at Michigan State*	#4	Munn Ice Arena • East Lansing, Michigan		Galajda	W 6–2	5,752	2–0–0
November 8	7:08 PM	vs. Brown	#4	Lynah Rink • Ithaca, New York		Galajda	W 4–1	3,451	3–0–0 (1–0–0)
November 9	7:02 PM	vs. Yale	#4	Lynah Rink • Ithaca, New York		Galajda	W 6–2	4,117	4–0–0 (2–0–0)
November 15	7:00 PM	at #7 Clarkson	#3	Cheel Arena • Potsdam, New York		Galajda	W 4–2	2,911	5–0–0 (3–0–0)
November 16	7:00 PM	at St. Lawrence	#3	Roos House • Canton, New York		Galajda	W 6–1	592	6–0–0 (4–0–0)
November 22	7:02 PM	vs. Quinnipiac	#2	Lynah Rink • Ithaca, New York		Galajda	W 2–1	3,876	7–0–0 (5–0–0)
November 23	7:02 PM	vs. Princeton	#2	Lynah Rink • Ithaca, New York		Galajda	W 5–1	4,267	8–0–0 (6–0–0)
November 30	8:00 PM	vs. Boston University*	#2	Madison Square Garden • New York, New York (Red Hot Hockey)		Galajda	W 2–0	15,142	9–0–0 (6–0–0)
December 6	7:00 PM	at #12 Harvard	#2	Bright-Landry Hockey Center • Boston, Massachusetts		Galajda	W 3–1	3,095	10–0–0 (7–0–0)
December 7	7:02 PM	at Dartmouth	#2	Thompson Arena • Hanover, New Hampshire		Galajda	L 1–2	2,267	10–1–0 (7–1–0)
Fortress Invitational
January 3	11:35 PM	vs. #6 Ohio State*	#2	T-Mobile Arena • Paradise, Nevada (Fortress Invitational Semifinal)		Galajda	W 5–2	3,735	11–1–0 (7–1–0)
January 4	8:30 PM	vs. #14 Providence*	#2	T-Mobile Arena • Paradise, Nevada (Fortress Invitational Championship)		Galajda	T 2–2 ^{SOL}	4,769	11–1–1 (7–1–0)
January 10	7:05 PM	at Rensselaer	#2	Houston Field House • Troy, New York		Galajda	W 3–0	2,879	12–1–1 (8–1–0)
January 11	7:00 PM	at Union	#2	Achilles Rink • Schenectady, New York		Galajda	T 3–3 ^{OT}	2,184	12–1–2 (8–1–1)
January 17	7:00 PM	vs. #17 Northern Michigan*	#1	Lynah Rink • Ithaca, New York		Galajda	T 2–2 ^{OT}	3,511	12–1–3 (8–1–1)
January 18	7:00 PM	vs. #17 Northern Michigan*	#1	Lynah Rink • Ithaca, New York		Galajda	W 3–1	3,876	13–1–3 (8–1–1)
January 24	7:00 PM	vs. #20 Dartmouth	#1	Lynah Rink • Ithaca, New York		Galajda	W 3–2	4,267	14–1–3 (9–1–1)
January 25	8:00 PM	vs. #16 Harvard	#1	Lynah Rink • Ithaca, New York		Galajda	T 1–1 ^{OT}	4,267	14–1–4 (9–1–2)
January 31	7:00 PM	at #18 Quinnipiac	#1	People's United Center • Hamden, Connecticut		Galajda	L 0–5	3,488	14–2–4 (9–2–2)
February 1	7:00 PM	at Princeton	#1	Hobey Baker Memorial Rink • Princeton, New Jersey		Galajda	W 5–3	2,500	15–2–4 (10–2–2)
February 8	7:00 PM	at Colgate	#2	Class of 1965 Arena • Hamilton, New York		Galajda	W 4–1	2,056	16–2–4 (11–2–2)
February 9 †	4:02 PM	vs. Colgate	#2	Lynah Rink • Ithaca, New York		Galajda	W 5–3	4,077	17–2–4 (12–2–2)
February 14	7:00 PM	vs. Union	#2	Lynah Rink • Ithaca, New York		Galajda	W 5–2	3,601	18–2–4 (13–2–2)
February 15	7:00 PM	vs. Rensselaer	#2	Lynah Rink • Ithaca, New York		Galajda	W 4–2	4,267	19–2–4 (14–2–2)
February 21	7:00 PM	at Yale	#2	Ingalls Rink • New Haven, Connecticut		Galajda	W 4–0	3,015	20–2–4 (15–2–2)
February 22	7:00 PM	at Brown	#2	Meehan Auditorium • Providence, Rhode Island		Galajda	W 3–0	1,418	21–2–4 (16–2–2)
February 28	7:00 PM	vs. St. Lawrence	#1	Lynah Rink • Ithaca, New York		Galajda	W 5–0	3,889	22–2–4 (17–2–2)
February 29	7:00 PM	vs. #7 Clarkson	#1	Lynah Rink • Ithaca, New York		Galajda	W 5–1	4,267	23–2–4 (18–2–2)
ECAC Hockey Tournament
Remainder of Tournament Cancelled
*Non-conference game. ^{#}Rankings from USCHO.com Poll. All times are in Eastern Time.

† Postponed from February 7 due to inclement weather.

== Scoring statistics ==
Name	Position	Games	Goals	Assists	Points	PIM
Morgan Barron	C	29	14	18	32	24
Brenden Locke	C	29	8	18	26	4
Yanni Kaldis	D	29	5	19	24	4
Tristan Mullin	F	29	9	13	22	22
Max Andreev	F	24	5	15	20	12
Michael Regush	C	29	11	7	18	8
Cam Donaldson	C	25	5	13	18	10
Ben Berard	LW	27	7	10	17	4
Alex Green	D	29	7	9	16	33
Sam Malinski	D	25	4	12	16	12
Jeff Malott	LW	29	6	7	13	12
Travis Mitchell	D	29	2	10	12	29
Matt Stienburg	C/RW	27	5	5	10	45
Kyle Betts	C	24	3	7	10	6
Noah Bauld	C	26	2	7	9	29
Jack Malone	C/RW	27	2	6	8	4
Joe Leahy	D	10	3	4	7	4
Sebastian Dirven	D	28	1	3	4	18
Zach Tupker	C	20	1	2	3	2
Cody Haiskanen	D	23	0	3	3	4
Liam Motley	F	5	2	0	2	0
Ben Tupker	LW	8	2	0	2	2
Matt Cairns	D	19	0	1	1	4
Austin McGrath	G	1	0	0	0	0
Matthew Galajda	G	29	0	0	0	0
Bench	-	-	-	-	-	2
Total			104	189	293	294

== Goaltending statistics ==
Name	Games	Minutes	Wins	Losses	Ties	Goals against	Saves	Shut outs	SV %	GAA
Austin McGrath	1	17	0	0	0	0	5	0	1.000	0.00
Matthew Galajda	29	1733	23	2	4	45	608	5	.931	1.56
Empty Net	-	9	-	-	-	0	-	-	-	-
Total	29	1760	23	2	4	45	613	5	.932	1.53

== Rankings ==
Poll	Week																							
Poll	Pre	1	2	3	4	5	6	7	8	9	10	11	12	13	14	15	16	17	18	19	20	21	22	23 (Final)
USCHO.com	5	5	5	4	4	4	3	2	2	2	3	3	2	2	2	1	1	2	2	2	1	1	1	1
USA Today	5	4	5	3	5	4	4	2	2	2	3	3	2	2	2	1	1	2	2	2	2	1	1	1
