= 2019–20 RPI Engineers men's ice hockey season =

- Conference: T–4th ECAC Hockey
- Home ice: Houston Field House

Rankings
- USCHO.com: NR
- USA Today/ US Hockey Magazine: NR

Record
- Overall: 17–15–2
- Conference: 13–8–1
- Home: 8–7–0
- Road: 9–8–1
- Neutral: 0–0–1

Coaches and captains
- Head coach: Dave Smith
- Assistant coaches: Scott Moser; Chuck Weber; Nate Skidmore
- Captain: Will Reilly
- Alternate captain(s): Chase Zieky; Shane Bear; Patrick Polino; T. J. Samec

The 2019–20 RPI Engineers Men's ice hockey season was the 101st season of play for the program and the 59th season in the ECAC Hockey conference. The Engineers represented Rensselaer Polytechnic Institute and played their home games at Houston Field House, and were coached by Dave Smith, in his 3rd season.

On March 12, ECAC Hockey announced that the remainder of the tournament was cancelled due to the COVID-19 pandemic.

== Departures ==
Player	Position	Nationality	Cause
Jaren Burke	Forward	Canada	Transfer (Queen's)
Thomas Grant	Defenseman	United States	Graduation (Retired)
Matt Harris	Defenseman	United States	Transfer (Long Island)
Jacob Hayhurst	Forward	Canada	Graduate Transfer (Michigan)
Meirs Moore	Defenseman	Sweden	Graduation (signed with Pensacola Ice Flyers)
Donovan Ott	Forward	United States	Transfer (Utica)
Chase Perry	Goaltender	Canada	Signed Professional Contract (Pensacola Ice Flyers)
Brady Wiffen	Forward	Canada	Graduation (signed with Seaforth Centenaires)

== Recruiting ==
Player	Position	Nationality	Age	Notes
Tristan Ashbrook	Forward	United States	21	Manistique, MI
Cory Babichuk	Defenseman	Canada	19	Edmonton, AB
Alec Calvaruso	Goaltender	United States	21	Livonia, MI
Zach Dubinsky	Forward	United States	19	Deerfield, IL
Louis Helsen	Defenseman	United States	21	Dallas, TX
Rory Herrman	Forward	United States	20	Poway, CA
Simon Kjellberg	Defenseman	United States	19	Nashville, TN
Mason Klee	Defenseman	United States	19	Morrison, CO
Ryan Mahshie	Defenseman	Canada	20	Stoney Creek, ON

== Roster ==
As of September 5, 2019.

No.	Nat.	Player	Class	Pos	Height	Weight	DoB	Hometown	Previous team	NHL rights
1	(Canada)	Linden Marshall	Junior	G	6' 3" (1.91 m)	195 lb (88 kg)	1998-07-21	Victoria, British Columbia	Trail Smoke Eaters (BCHL)	—
2	(United States)	Simon Kjellberg	Freshman	D	6' 3" (1.91 m)	190 lb (86 kg)	2000-02-17	Nashville, Tennessee	Dubuque Fighting Saints (USHL)	NYR, 163rd overall 2018
3	(United States)	T. J. Samec (A)	Senior	D	6' 3" (1.91 m)	210 lb (95 kg)	1995-05-03	Saint Paul, Minnesota	Brookings Blizzard (NAHL)	—
4	(United States)	Mason Klee	Freshman	D	6' 2" (1.88 m)	195 lb (88 kg)	1999-10-04	Morrison, Colorado	Sioux Falls Stampede (USHL)	—
6	(United States)	Brady Ferner	Sophomore	D	5' 10" (1.78 m)	190 lb (86 kg)	1997-08-27	Dakota Dunes, South Dakota	Sioux City Musketeers (USHL)	—
7	(United States)	Nick Bowman	Sophomore	F	6' 0" (1.83 m)	200 lb (91 kg)	1997-12-19	Shelby Township, Michigan	Coulee Region Chill (NAHL)	—
8	(United States)	Mike Gornall	Senior	F	6' 0" (1.83 m)	200 lb (91 kg)	1994-10-26	Irwin, Pennsylvania	North Dakota (NCHC)	—
9	(United States)	Tristan Ashbrook	Freshman	F	5' 11" (1.8 m)	175 lb (79 kg)	1998-07-16	Manistique, Michigan	Lincoln Stars (USHL)	—
11	(Finland)	Ottoville Leppänen	Sophomore	F	5' 10" (1.78 m)	185 lb (84 kg)	1998-06-18	Espoo, Finland	Espoo Blues U20 (Nuorten SM-liiga)	—
12	(United States)	Chase Zieky (A)	Senior	F	5' 11" (1.8 m)	185 lb (84 kg)	1996-03-24	Avon, Connecticut	Providence (HEA)	—
13	(Canada)	Tommy Lee	Sophomore	F	5' 8" (1.73 m)	160 lb (73 kg)	1997-12-07	Calgary, Alberta	Chilliwack Chiefs (BCHL)	—
14	(United States)	Zach Dubinsky	Freshman	F	5' 8" (1.73 m)	175 lb (79 kg)	2000-03-14	Highland Park, Illinois	Lincoln Stars (USHL)	—
16	(United States)	Rory Herrman	Freshman	F	6' 0" (1.83 m)	200 lb (91 kg)	1999-03-16	Poway, California	Fargo Force (USHL)	—
17	(United States)	Todd Burgess	Senior	F	6' 2" (1.88 m)	175 lb (79 kg)	1996-04-03	Phoenix, Arizona	Fairbanks Ice Dogs (USHL)	OTT, 103rd overall 2016
18	(United States)	Daniel DiGrande	Sophomore	F	5' 11" (1.8 m)	180 lb (82 kg)	1997-08-05	Macomb, Michigan	Green Bay Gamblers (USHL)	—
19	(United States)	Ture Linden	Sophomore	F	6' 0" (1.83 m)	190 lb (86 kg)	1997-07-06	Great Falls, Virginia	Lone Star Brahmas (NAHL)	—
20	(United States)	Billy Jerry	Junior	F	6' 4" (1.93 m)	190 lb (86 kg)	1997-11-21	River Falls, Wisconsin	Madison Capitols (USHL)	—
21	(United States)	Louie Helsen	Freshman	D	6' 2" (1.88 m)	200 lb (91 kg)	1998-06-08	Dallas, Texas	Amarillo Bulls (NAHL)	—
22	(Canada)	Cory Babichuk	Freshman	D	5' 10" (1.78 m)	175 lb (79 kg)	1998-09-28	Edmonton, Alberta	Spruce Grove Saints (AJHL)	—
23	(United States)	Jake Johnson	Sophomore	D	6' 0" (1.83 m)	185 lb (84 kg)	1998-08-13	Bloomington, Minnesota	Cedar Rapids RoughRiders (USHL)	—
24	(Canada)	Will Reilly (C)	Senior	D	6' 3" (1.91 m)	195 lb (88 kg)	1997-07-23	Toronto, Ontario	Nanaimo Clippers (BCHL)	PIT, 217th overall 2017
25	(Canada)	Ryan Mahshie	Freshman	F	6' 3" (1.91 m)	210 lb (95 kg)	1999-04-05	Stoney Creek, Ontario	Brooks Bandits (AJHL)	—
26	(United States)	Jake Marrello	Senior	F	5' 8" (1.73 m)	170 lb (77 kg)	1997-08-04	Slingerlands, New York	P.A.L. Jr. Islanders (USPHL)	—
27	(Canada)	Shane Bear (A)	Senior	D	5' 10" (1.78 m)	185 lb (84 kg)	1997-02-17	Calgary, Alberta	Brooks Bandits (AJHL)	—
28	(United States)	Kyle Hallbauer	Sophomore	D	5' 11" (1.8 m)	190 lb (86 kg)	1997-03-02	Howell, New Jersey	Lone Star Brahmas (NAHL)	—
29	(United States)	Patrick Polino (A)	Senior	F	5' 9" (1.75 m)	170 lb (77 kg)	1995-04-11	Buffalo, New York	Lincoln Stars (USHL)	—
31	(Canada)	Owen Savory	Sophomore	G	6' 0" (1.83 m)	185 lb (84 kg)	1997-10-11	Cambridge, Ontario	St. Catharines Falcons (GOJHL)	—
38	(United States)	Alec Calvaruso	Freshman	G	6' 2" (1.88 m)	180 lb (82 kg)	1998-07-09	Livonia, Michigan	Sioux Falls Stampede (USHL)	—
39	(Slovakia)	Jakub Lacka	Sophomore	F	6' 0" (1.83 m)	190 lb (86 kg)	1998-11-20	Bratislava, Slovakia	Central Illinois Flying Aces (USHL)	—

== Standings ==
2019–20 ECAC Hockey Standings
	Conference record							Overall record					
	GP	W	L	T	PTS	GF	GA	GP	W	L	T	GF	GA
#1 Cornell †	22	18	2	2	38	81	34	29	23	2	4	104	45
#7 Clarkson	22	16	5	1	33	63	38	34	23	8	3	96	63
#14 Quinnipiac	22	14	6	2	30	64	45	34	21	11	2	94	78
Rensselaer	22	13	8	1	27	63	41	34	17	15	2	95	87
Harvard	22	11	6	5	27	82	59	31	15	10	6	116	87
Dartmouth	22	10	10	2	22	60	73	31	13	14	4	93	106
Yale	22	10	10	2	22	57	64	32	15	15	2	77	97
Colgate	22	8	9	5	21	50	54	36	12	16	8	76	87
Brown	22	8	12	2	18	41	54	31	8	21	2	52	84
Union	22	5	15	2	12	46	71	37	8	25	4	67	112
Princeton	22	2	16	4	8	46	71	31	6	20	5	66	100
St. Lawrence	22	2	18	2	6	37	81	36	4	27	5	64	130
Championship: March 21, 2020 † indicates conference regular season champion (Cleary Cup) * indicates conference tournament champion (Whitelaw Cup); Rankings: USCHO.com Top 20 Poll; updated March 23, 2020

== Schedule and results ==
Date	Time	Opponent^{#}	Rank^{#}	Site	TV	Decision	Result	Attendance	Record
Exhibition
October 5	4:00 PM	vs. Brock*		Houston Field House • Troy, New York (Exhibition)		Marshall	W 6–3	1,937	
Regular season
October 11	7:00 PM	at #4 Massachusetts*		Mullins Center • Amherst, Massachusetts	NESN	Savory	L 3–5	3,628	0–1–0
October 12	7:31 PM	at Connecticut*		XL Center • Hartford, Connecticut		Marshall	W 5–3	2,859	1–1–0
October 18	7:00 PM	vs. Connecticut*		Houston Field House • Troy, New York		Marshall	L 2–5	2,588	1–2–0
October 19	7:00 PM	vs. Canisius*		Houston Field House • Troy, New York		Savory	W 7–2	3,258	2–2–0
October 25	7:00 PM	at Union		Achilles Rink • Schenectady, New York		Savory	W 3–2	2,062	3–2–0 (1–0–0)
October 26	7:00 PM	vs. Union		Houston Field House • Troy, New York		Savory	L 1–2	3,108	3–3–0 (1–1–0)
November 8	7:00 PM	vs. St. Lawrence		Houston Field House • Troy, New York		Savory	W 6–2	1,831	4–3–0 (2–1–0)
November 9	7:00 PM	vs. #8 Clarkson		Houston Field House • Troy, New York		Savory	L 1–2	3,426	4–4–0 (2–2–0)
November 15	7:05 PM	at Princeton		Hobey Baker Memorial Rink • Princeton, New Jersey		Savory	T 2–2 ^{OT}	1,524	4–4–1 (2–2–1)
November 16	7:05 PM	vs. Quinnipiac		People's United Center • Hamden, Connecticut		Savory	L 1–3	3,090	4–5–1 (2–3–1)
November 22	7:00 PM	vs. #10 Harvard		Houston Field House • Troy, New York		Savory	L 3–6	2,554	4–6–1 (2–4–1)
November 23	7:35 PM	at Canisius*		LECOM Harborcenter • Buffalo, New York		Marshall	W 3–2	1,107	5–6–1 (2–4–1)
November 29	4:05 PM	at #15 Massachusetts–Lowell*		Tsongas Center • Lowell, Massachusetts		Marshall	L 0–4	3,512	5–7–1 (2–4–1)
November 30	7:05 PM	at Merrimack*		J. Thom Lawler Rink • North Andover, Massachusetts		Savory	L 1–5	1,301	5–8–1 (2–4–1)
December 6	7:00 PM	vs. Yale		Houston Field House • Troy, New York		Savory	L 1–4	1,718	5–9–1 (2–5–1)
December 7	7:00 PM	vs. Brown		Houston Field House • Troy, New York		Calvaruso	W 2–1 ^{OT}	2,101	6–9–1 (3–5–1)
December 29	7:00 PM	at #9 Massachusetts*		Houston Field House • Troy, New York		Calvaruso	L 3–5	2,332	6–10–1 (3–5–1)
January 3	7:00 PM	at #4 Clarkson		Cheel Arena • Potsdam, New York		Marshall	W 3–1	2,468	7–10–1 (4–5–1)
January 4	7:00 PM	at St. Lawrence		Roos House • Canton, New York		Savory	W 3–0	502	8–10–1 (5–5–1)
January 10	7:05 PM	vs. #2 Cornell		Houston Field House • Troy, New York		Marshall	L 0–3	2,879	8–11–1 (5–6–1)
January 11	7:00 PM	vs. Colgate		Houston Field House • Troy, New York		Savory	W 3–0	2,337	9–11–1 (6–6–1)
January 17	7:00 PM	at Brown		Meehan Auditorium • Providence, Rhode Island		Savory	W 3–1	602	10–11–1 (7–6–1)
January 18	7:00 PM	at Yale		Ingalls Rink • New Haven, Connecticut		Calvaruso	L 1–4	2,174	10–12–1 (7–7–1)
January 25	7:00 PM	vs. Union*		Times Union Center • Albany, New York (Mayor's Cup)		Savory	T 1–1 ^{SOW}	6,164	10–12–2 (7–7–1)
January 31	7:00 PM	vs. Dartmouth		Houston Field House • Troy, New York		Savory	W 7–1	2,351	11–12–2 (8–7–1)
February 1	7:00 PM	vs. Vermont*		Houston Field House • Troy, New York		Savory	W 1–0	3,806	12–12–2 (8–7–1)
February 7	7:00 PM	at Western Michigan*		Lawson Arena • Kalamazoo, Michigan		Calvaruso	L 4–8	2,575	12–13–2 (8–7–1)
February 8	7:00 PM	at Western Michigan*		Lawson Arena • Kalamazoo, Michigan		Savory	L 2–6	2,975	12–14–2 (8–7–1)
February 14	7:00 PM	at Colgate		Class of 1965 Arena • Hamilton, New York		Savory	W 4–1	813	13–14–2 (9–7–1)
February 15	7:02 PM	at #2 Cornell		Lynah Rink • Ithaca, New York		Savory	L 2–4	4,267	13–15–2 (9–8–1)
February 21	7:00 PM	vs. #16 Quinnipiac		Houston Field House • Troy, New York		Savory	W 4–0	3,008	14–15–2 (10–8–1)
February 22	7:00 PM	vs. Princeton		Houston Field House • Troy, New York		Savory	W 7–1	2,764	15–15–2 (11–8–1)
February 28	7:00 PM	at Harvard		Bright-Landry Hockey Center • Boston, Massachusetts		Savory	W 2–0	1,722	16–15–2 (12–8–1)
February 29	7:00 PM	vs. Dartmouth		Thompson Arena • Hanover, New Hampshire		Savory	W 4–1	2,157	17–15–2 (13–8–1)
ECAC Hockey Tournament
Remainder of Tournament Cancelled
*Non-conference game. ^{#}Rankings from USCHO.com Poll. All times are in Eastern Time.

== Scoring statistics ==
Name	Position	Games	Goals	Assists	Points	PIM
Chase Zieky	F	34	7	16	23	12
Will Reilly	D	34	8	14	22	12
Ture Linden	F	34	6	15	21	2
Todd Burgess	C/RW	32	14	6	20	20
Patrick Polino	C	34	11	8	19	18
Mike Gornall	F	34	5	14	19	18
Jake Marrello	F	31	7	11	18	12
Cory Babichuk	D	27	4	12	16	6
Ottoville Leppänen	F	33	4	10	14	2
Tristan Ashbrook	RW	34	9	4	13	14
Zach Dubinsky	F	22	2	10	12	4
Simon Kjellberg	D	32	5	6	11	30
Brady Ferner	D	34	2	6	8	8
Jake Johnson	D	32	0	6	6	26
Billy Jerry	C	33	3	2	5	8
Kyle Hallbauer	D	33	0	5	5	6
Daniel DiGrande	C	18	3	1	4	10
Mason Klee	D	21	1	3	4	6
Rory Herrman	F	21	1	3	4	6
Ryan Mahshie	D	16	2	1	3	4
Nick Bowman	F	10	0	3	3	0
Shane Bear	D	15	0	3	3	2
Owen Savory	G	24	0	3	3	0
Jakub Lacka	LW	12	1	1	2	12
Linden Marshall	G	8	0	1	1	0
T. J. Samec	D	10	0	1	1	6
Tommy Lee	F	10	0	1	1	8
Alec Calvaruso	G	5	0	0	0	0
Bench	-	-	-	-	-	2
Total			95	166	261	254

== Goaltending statistics ==
Name	Games	Minutes	Wins	Losses	Ties	Goals against	Saves	Shut outs	SV %	GAA
Owen Savory	24	1401	13	9	2	48	655	5	.932	2.06
Linden Marshall	8	393	3	3	0	19	179	0	.904	2.90
Alec Calvaruso	5	245	1	3	0	16	106	0	.869	3.91
Empty Net	-	10	-	-	-	4	-	-	-	-
Total	34	2050	17	15	2	87	940	5	.915	2.55

== Rankings ==
Poll	Week																							
Poll	Pre	1	2	3	4	5	6	7	8	9	10	11	12	13	14	15	16	17	18	19	20	21	22	23 (Final)
USCHO.com	NR	NR	NR	NR	NR	NR	NR	NR	NR	NR	NR	NR	NR	NR	NR	NR	NR	NR	NR	NR	NR	NR	NR	NR
USA Today	NR	NR	NR	NR	NR	NR	NR	NR	NR	NR	NR	NR	NR	NR	NR	NR	NR	NR	NR	NR	NR	NR	NR	NR
