= 2019–20 Dartmouth Big Green men's ice hockey season =

Ledyard Bank Classic, Champion
- Conference: 6th ECAC Hockey
- Home ice: Thompson Arena

Rankings
- USCHO.com: NR
- USA Today/ US Hockey Magazine: NR

Record
- Overall: 13–14–4
- Conference: 10–10–2
- Home: 9–6–2
- Road: 4–8–2
- Neutral: 0–0–0

Coaches and captains
- Head coach: Bob Gaudet
- Assistant coaches: David Lassonde; John Rose; Brian McCloskey

The 2019–20 Dartmouth Big Green Men's ice hockey season was the 114th season of play for the program and the 59th season in the ECAC Hockey conference. The Big Green represented the Dartmouth College and were coached by Bob Gaudet, in his 23rd season as their head coach. After the season Gaudet announced his retirement.

== Departures ==
Player	Position	Nationality	Cause
John Ernsting	Forward	United States	Graduation (Retired)
Carl Hesler	Forward	United States	Graduation (Retired)
Alex Jasiek	Forward	United States	Graduation (Retired)
Kevan Kilistoff	Forward	Canada	Graduation (Retired)
Charlie Michalowski	Forward	United States	Signed Professional Contract (Worcester Railers)
Cam Roth	Defenseman	Canada	Graduation (Retired)
Shane Sellar	Forward	United States	Transfer (Rensselaer)
Connor Yau	Forward/Defenseman	United States	Graduation (signed with Utah Grizzlies)

== Recruiting ==
Player	Position	Nationality	Age	Notes
Jack Cameron	Defenseman	Canada	20	Halifax, NS
Tyler Campbell	Forward	Canada	20	Winnipeg, MB
Mark Gallant	Forward	United States	19	Concord, MA
Sean Keohan	Defenseman	United States	20	Milton, MA
Tanner Palocsik	Defenseman	United States	20	Aliquippa, PA
Brock Paul	Defenseman	United States	19	Carmel, IN
Erik Urbank	Forward	United States	20	Orchard Park, NY

== Roster ==
As of November 26, 2019.

No.	Nat.	Player	Class	Pos	Height	Weight	DoB	Hometown	Previous team	NHL rights
2	(United States)	Harrison Markell	Sophomore	D	6' 1" (1.85 m)	185 lb (84 kg)	1997-02-12	Andover, Massachusetts	Boston Junior Bruins (NCDC)	—
3	(United States)	Joey Matthews	Junior	D	5' 9" (1.75 m)	180 lb (82 kg)	1997-06-24	Columbia, Illinois	Sioux City Musketeers (USHL)	—
4	(United States)	Ben DiMaio	Senior	D	6' 2" (1.88 m)	190 lb (86 kg)	1996-02-21	Pembroke, Massachusetts	Odessa Jackalopes (NAHL)	—
5	(United States)	Brock Paul	Freshman	D	6' 3" (1.91 m)	205 lb (93 kg)	1999-11-10	Carmel, Indiana	Waterloo Blackhawks (USHL)	—
6	(United States)	Tanner Palocsik	Freshman	D	5' 11" (1.8 m)	190 lb (86 kg)	1999-05-26	Aliquippa, Pennsylvania	Jersey Hitmen (NCDC)	—
7	(Canada)	Jack Cameron	Freshman	D	6' 3" (1.91 m)	190 lb (86 kg)	1999-04-18	Halifax, Nova Scotia	Coquitlam Express (BCHL)	—
8	(United States)	Daniel Warpecha	Senior	F	6' 0" (1.83 m)	190 lb (86 kg)	1997-06-12	Willow Springs, Illinois	Sioux Falls Stampede (USHL)	—
9	(United States)	Collin Rutherford	Junior	F	5' 8" (1.73 m)	165 lb (75 kg)	1997-12-29	Tonawanda, New York	Des Moines Buccaneers (USHL)	—
11	(United States)	Mark Gallant	Freshman	F	6' 0" (1.83 m)	185 lb (84 kg)	2000-05-01	Concord, Massachusetts	Langley Rivermen (BCHL)	—
12	(United States)	Cam Strong	Senior	F	6' 0" (1.83 m)	185 lb (84 kg)	1995-03-19	Billings, Montana	Topeka RoadRunners (NAHL)	—
14	(Canada)	Matt Baker	Junior	F	5' 11" (1.8 m)	170 lb (77 kg)	1997-02-21	Midhurst, Ontario	Wenatchee Wild (NAHL)	—
16	(Canada)	Tyler Campbell	Freshman	F	5' 9" (1.75 m)	170 lb (77 kg)	1999-10-01	Winnipeg, Manitoba	Brooks Bandits (AJHL)	—
17	(United States)	Quinn Foreman	Junior	F	6' 3" (1.91 m)	195 lb (88 kg)	2001-02-14	Needham, Massachusetts	West Kelowna Warriors (BCHL)	—
18	(United States)	Drew O'Connor	Sophomore	F	6' 3" (1.91 m)	190 lb (86 kg)	1998-06-09	Chatham, New Jersey	Boston Junior Bruins (NCDC)	—
20	(United States)	Erik Urbank	Sophomore	F	6' 1" (1.85 m)	190 lb (86 kg)	1999-03-28	Lakeview, New York	Chicago Steel (USHL)	—
21	(United States)	Christian Lesueur	Sophomore	F	5' 10" (1.78 m)	175 lb (79 kg)	1999-01-07	Greenwich, Connecticut	Brunswick School (USHS)	—
22	(United States)	Sam Hesler	Sophomore	F	6' 1" (1.85 m)	190 lb (86 kg)	1998-06-06	Boxborough, Massachusetts	Wenatchee Wild (BCHL)	—
23	(United States)	Clay Han	Senior	D	5' 11" (1.8 m)	180 lb (82 kg)	1995-02-23	Liberty Township, Ohio	Boston Junior Bruins (NCDC)	—
24	(United States)	Brendan Less	Junior	D	5' 11" (1.8 m)	170 lb (77 kg)	1998-04-24	Kinnelon, New Jersey	Jersey Hitmen (USPHL)	—
25	(United States)	Ryan Blankemeier	Senior	F	6' 0" (1.83 m)	170 lb (77 kg)	1996-09-21	Oak Park, Illinois	Chicago Steel (USHL)	—
26	(United States)	Jeffrey Losurdo	Sophomore	F	6' 0" (1.83 m)	185 lb (84 kg)	1998-05-09	Elmhurst, Illinois	Jersey Hitmen (NCDC)	—
27	(United States)	Brendan Demler	Junior	D	6' 0" (1.83 m)	180 lb (82 kg)	1997-08-18	Lebanon, Ohio	Des Moines Buccaneers (USHL)	—
28	(United States)	Will Graber	Senior	F	6' 5" (1.96 m)	190 lb (86 kg)	1996-06-03	Longmont, Colorado	Fargo Force (USHL)	—
29	(United States)	Sean Keohan	Freshman	F	5' 11" (1.8 m)	185 lb (84 kg)	1999-02-09	Milton, Massachusetts	Boston Junior Bruins (NCDC)	—
30	(United States)	Dean Shatzer	Senior	G	5' 11" (1.8 m)	185 lb (84 kg)	1996-09-14	Castle Rock, Colorado	Odessa Jackalopes (NAHL)	—
31	(United States)	Justin Ferguson	Sophomore	G	6' 2" (1.88 m)	165 lb (75 kg)	1997-08-06	Hudson, New Hampshire	Islanders Hockey Club (NCDC)	—
35	(Canada)	Adrian Clark	Senior	G	6' 3" (1.91 m)	200 lb (91 kg)	1997-07-05	Toronto, Ontario	South Shore Lumberjacks (MHL)	—

== Standings ==
2019–20 ECAC Hockey Standings
	Conference record							Overall record					
	GP	W	L	T	PTS	GF	GA	GP	W	L	T	GF	GA
#1 Cornell †	22	18	2	2	38	81	34	29	23	2	4	104	45
#7 Clarkson	22	16	5	1	33	63	38	34	23	8	3	96	63
#14 Quinnipiac	22	14	6	2	30	64	45	34	21	11	2	94	78
Rensselaer	22	13	8	1	27	63	41	34	17	15	2	95	87
Harvard	22	11	6	5	27	82	59	31	15	10	6	116	87
Dartmouth	22	10	10	2	22	60	73	31	13	14	4	93	106
Yale	22	10	10	2	22	57	64	32	15	15	2	77	97
Colgate	22	8	9	5	21	50	54	36	12	16	8	76	87
Brown	22	8	12	2	18	41	54	31	8	21	2	52	84
Union	22	5	15	2	12	46	71	37	8	25	4	67	112
Princeton	22	2	16	4	8	46	71	31	6	20	5	66	100
St. Lawrence	22	2	18	2	6	37	81	36	4	27	5	64	130
Championship: March 21, 2020 † indicates conference regular season champion (Cleary Cup) * indicates conference tournament champion (Whitelaw Cup); Rankings: USCHO.com Top 20 Poll; updated March 23, 2020

== Schedule and results ==
Date	Time	Opponent^{#}	Rank^{#}	Site	TV	Decision	Result	Attendance	Record
Exhibition
October 19		vs. #19 Harvard*		Thompson Arena • Hanover, New Hampshire (Exhibition)			L 2–4		
Regular season
November 1	7:30 PM	at #19 Harvard		Bright-Landry Hockey Center • Boston, Massachusetts		Ferguson	L 3–7	1,500	0–1–0 (0–1–0)
November 2	7:05 PM	vs. New Hampshire*		Whittemore Center • Durham, New Hampshire		Clark	L 4–5 ^{OT}	4,012	0–2–0 (0–1–0)
November 8	7:02 PM	vs. #15 Quinnipiac		Thompson Arena • Hanover, New Hampshire		Clark	T 2–2 ^{OT}	1,589	0–2–1 (0–1–1)
November 9	7:02 PM	vs. Princeton		Thompson Arena • Hanover, New Hampshire		Clark	W 3–1	2,837	1–2–1 (1–1–1)
November 15	7:00 PM	at Yale		Ingalls Rink • New Haven, Connecticut		Clark	W 4–3	1,842	2–2–1 (2–1–1)
November 16	7:00 PM	at Brown		Meehan Auditorium • Providence, Rhode Island		Clark	W 4–1	489	3–2–1 (3–1–1)
December 6	7:02 PM	vs. Colgate		Thompson Arena • Hanover, New Hampshire		Clark	L 1–5	1,303	3–3–1 (3–2–1)
December 7	7:00 PM	vs. #2 Cornell		Thompson Arena • Hanover, New Hampshire		Clark	W 2–1	2,267	4–3–1 (4–2–1)
December 12	7:00 PM	vs. Bentley*		Thompson Arena • Hanover, New Hampshire	NESN+	Clark	T 2–2 ^{OT}	1,175	4–3–2 (4–2–1)
December 14	4:00 PM	vs. #12 Northeastern*		Matthews Arena • Boston, Massachusetts	NESN	Clark	L 4–6	1,175	4–4–2 (4–2–1)
Ledyard Bank Classic
December 28	7:00 PM	vs. Colorado College*		Thompson Arena • Hanover, New Hampshire (Ledyard Bank Classic)	NESN	Clark	W 5–2	3,003	5–4–2 (4–2–1)
December 29	7:00 PM	vs. Connecticut*		Thompson Arena • Hanover, New Hampshire (Ledyard Bank Classic)		Clark	W 4–3	2,312	6–4–2 (4–2–1)
January 3	7:00 PM	at Princeton		Hobey Baker Memorial Rink • Princeton, New Jersey		Clark	W 4–3 ^{OT}	1,807	7–4–2 (5–2–1)
January 4	7:00 PM	at Quinnipiac		People's United Center • Hamden, Connecticut		Clark	L 1–5	2,757	7–5–2 (5–3–1)
January 10	7:05 PM	vs. Vermont*		Gutterson Fieldhouse • Burlington, Vermont		Clark	T 2–2 ^{OT}	3,127	7–5–3 (5–3–1)
January 11	7:00 PM	vs. Boston University*		Thompson Arena • Hanover, New Hampshire		Clark	W 5–4	2,511	8–5–3 (5–3–1)
January 17	7:00 PM	vs. #7 Clarkson		Thompson Arena • Hanover, New Hampshire	NESN+	Clark	W 3–2	2,021	9–5–3 (6–3–1)
January 18	7:00 PM	vs. St. Lawrence		Thompson Arena • Hanover, New Hampshire		Clark	W 3–1	2,369	10–5–3 (7–3–1)
January 24	7:00 PM	at #1 Cornell	#20	Lynah Rink • Ithaca, New York		Clark	L 2–3	4,267	10–6–3 (7–4–1)
January 25	7:00 PM	at Colgate	#20	Class of 1965 Arena • Hamilton, New York		Clark	T 3–3 ^{OT}	1,093	10–6–4 (7–4–2)
January 31	7:00 PM	at Rensselaer		Houston Field House • Troy, New York		Clark	L 1–7	2,351	10–7–4 (7–5–2)
February 1	7:00 PM	Union		Achilles Rink • Schenectady, New York		Clark	L 3–4	1,791	10–8–4 (7–6–2)
February 7	7:00 PM	vs. Harvard		Thompson Arena • Hanover, New Hampshire		Clark	L 2–6	1,991	10–9–4 (7–7–2)
February 14	7:02 PM	vs. Brown		Thompson Arena • Hanover, New Hampshire		Clark	W 5–2	1,492	11–9–4 (8–7–2)
February 15	7:02 PM	vs. Yale		Thompson Arena • Hanover, New Hampshire		Clark	L 3–4	2,469	11–10–4 (8–8–2)
February 21	7:00 PM	at St. Lawrence		Appleton Arena • Canton, New York		Clark	W 5–2	1,121	12–10–4 (9–8–2)
February 22	7:00 PM	at #5 Clarkson		Cheel Arena • Potsdam, New York		Clark	L 0–4	2,946	12–11–4 (9–9–2)
February 28	7:02 PM	vs. Union		Thompson Arena • Hanover, New Hampshire		Clark	W 5–3	1,581	13–11–4 (10–9–2)
February 29	7:02 PM	vs. Rensselaer		Thompson Arena • Hanover, New Hampshire		Clark	L 1–4	2,157	13–12–4 (10–10–2)
ECAC Hockey Tournament
March 6	7:02 PM	vs. Princeton*		Thompson Arena • Hanover, New Hampshire (First Round Game 1)		Clark	L 3–4 ^{OT}	865	13–13–4 (10–10–2)
March 7	7:02 PM	vs. Princeton*		Thompson Arena • Hanover, New Hampshire (First Round Game 2)		Clark	L 4–5 ^{OT}	1,221	13–14–4 (10–10–2)
Dartmouth Lost Series 0–2
*Non-conference game. ^{#}Rankings from USCHO.com Poll. All times are in Eastern Time.

== Scoring statistics ==
Name	Position	Games	Goals	Assists	Points	PIM
Drew O'Connor	F	31	21	12	33	42
Will Graber	C	31	11	16	27	30
Quin Foreman	RW	31	11	14	25	16
Matt Baker	C	31	6	18	24	32
Tanner Palocsik	D	31	5	19	24	12
Jeffrey Losurdo	F	30	6	9	15	31
Daniel Warpecha	LW	31	7	6	13	12
Sam Hesler	F	31	3	9	12	8
Collin Rutherford	C	30	3	8	11	10
Brendan Demler	D	31	1	9	10	17
Mark Gallant	F	26	4	5	9	6
Brendan Less	D	31	1	8	9	10
Cam Strong	LW	31	6	2	8	12
Joey Matthews	D	29	0	7	7	19
Tyler Campbell	C	29	3	2	5	2
Erik Urbank	RW	30	0	5	5	8
Brock Paul	D	24	0	4	4	20
Harrison Markell	D	27	2	1	3	2
Ryan Blankemeier	C	13	2	0	2	0
Clay Han	D	24	0	1	1	4
Christian Lesueur	RW	12	0	1	1	6
Ben DiMaio	D	1	0	0	0	0
Dean Shatzer	G	1	0	0	0	0
Sean Keohan	D	1	0	0	0	2
Justin Ferguson	G	2	0	0	0	0
Jack Cameron	F	8	0	0	0	0
Adrian Clark	G	30	0	0	0	0
Bench	-	31	-	-	-	2
Total						

== Goaltending statistics ==
Name	Games	Minutes	Wins	Losses	Ties	Goals against	Saves	Shut outs	SV %	GAA
Dean Shatzer	1	2	0	0	0	0	0	0	-	0.00
Adrian Clark	30	1811	13	13	4	94	817	0	.897	3.11
Justin Ferguson	2	71	0	1	0	8	35	0	.814	6.71
Empty Net	-	14	-	-	-	4	-	-	-	-
Total	31	1900	13	14	4	106	852	0	.889	3.35

== Rankings ==
Poll	Week																							
Poll	Pre	1	2	3	4	5	6	7	8	9	10	11	12	13	14	15	16	17	18	19	20	21	22	23 (Final)
USCHO.com	NR	NR	NR	NR	NR	NR	NR	NR	NR	NR	NR	NR	NR	NR	NR	20	NR	NR	NR	NR	NR	NR	NR	NR
USA Today	NR	NR	NR	NR	NR	NR	NR	NR	NR	NR	NR	NR	NR	NR	NR	NR	NR	NR	NR	NR	NR	NR	NR	NR
