= 2019–20 Brown Bears men's ice hockey season =

- Conference: 9th ECAC Hockey
- Home ice: Meehan Auditorium

Rankings
- USCHO: NR
- USA Today: NR

Record
- Overall: 8–21–2
- Conference: 8–12–2
- Home: 5–8–1
- Road: 3–13–1
- Neutral: 0–0–0

Coaches and captains
- Head coach: Brendan Whittet
- Assistant coaches: Jason Guerriero; Jason Smith; Ed Kesell
- Captain: Zach Giuttari
- Alternate captain(s): Brent Beaudoin; Jack Gessert

The 2019-20 Brown Bears Men's ice hockey season was the 103rd season of play for the program and the 59th season in the ECAC Hockey conference. The Bears represented Brown University and were coached by Brendan Whittet, in his 11th season.

== Departures ==
Player	Position	Nationality	Cause
Nolan Aibel	Forward	United States	Graduation (Retired)
Alex Brink	Forward	United States	Graduate Transfer (Boston University)
Max Gottlieb	Defenseman	United States	Graduation (signed with Ontario Reign)
Joey Maguire	Defenseman	United States	Graduation (Retired)
Tom Marchin	Forward	United States	Graduation (signed with Providence Bruins)
Will Scherer	Defenseman	United States	Graduate Transfer (Canisius)
Brady Schoo	Defenseman	United States	Graduation (Retired)
Conner Wynne	Defenseman	United States	Graduation (Retired)

== Recruiting ==
Player	Position	Nationality	Age	Notes
Luke Albert	Defenseman	Canada	21	Fergus, ON
Brad Cocca	Forward	Canada	20	Mississauga, ON
James Crossman	Defenseman	United States	21	Cherry Hills, CO
Matt Holmes	Forward	United States	20	Rye, NY
Luke Krys	Defenseman	United States	19	Ridgefield, CT
Connor Marshall	Forward	United States	21	Parkland, FL
Samuli Niinisaari	Defenseman	Finland	21	Hamina, FIN
Nathan Plessis	Forward	Canada	21	Salmon Arm, BC
Cole Quisenberry	Forward	United States	20	Cherry Hills, CO
Jon Russell	Forward	United States	21	Traverse City, MI

== Roster ==
As of July 10, 2019.

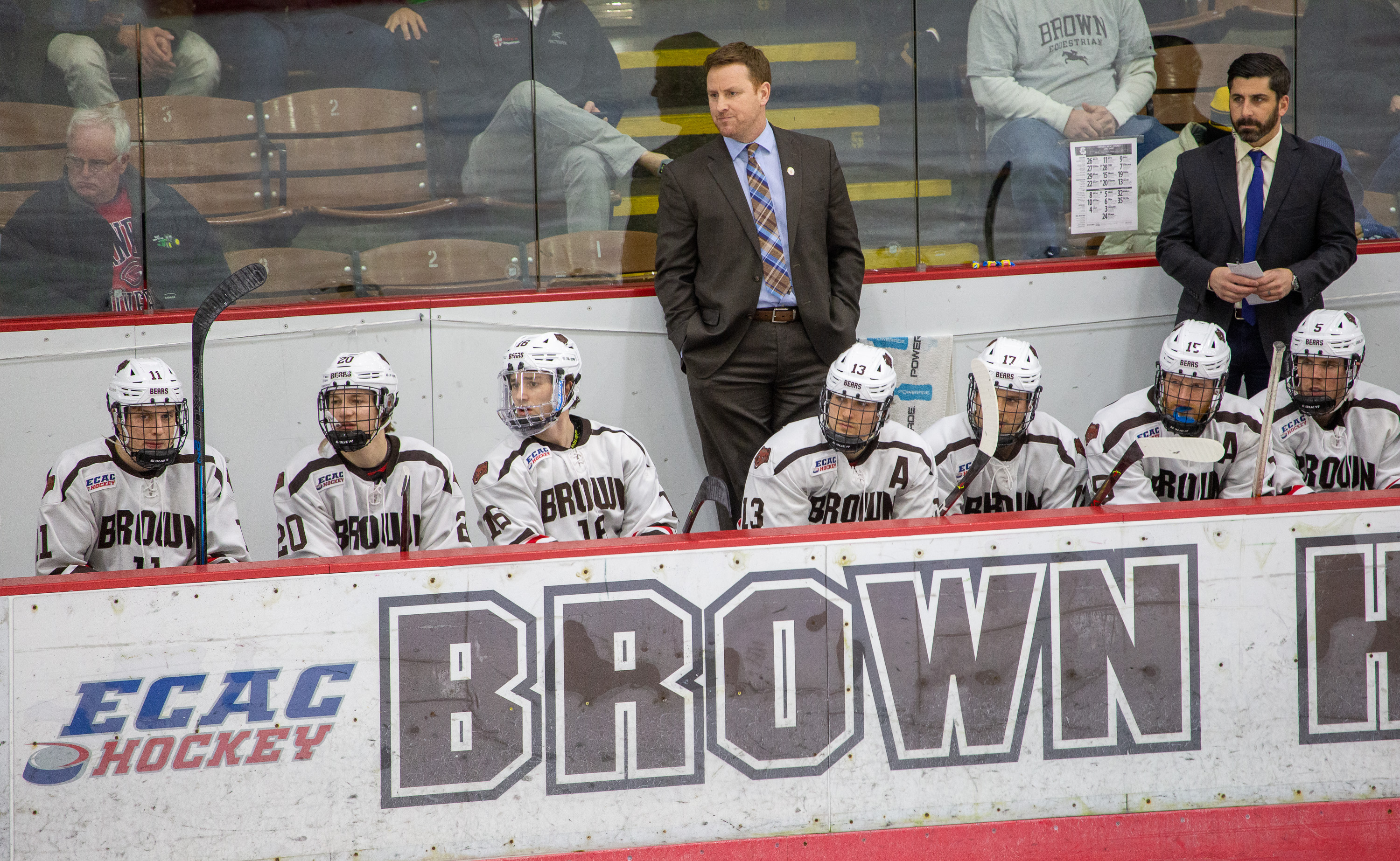
Coach Whittet and players in February 2020

No.	Nat.	Player	Class	Pos	Height	Weight	DoB	Hometown	Previous team	NHL rights
1	(United States)	Gavin Nieto	Senior	G	6' 1" (1.85 m)	180 lb (82 kg)	1996-02-01	Yorba Linda, California	Fairbanks Ice Dogs (NAHL)	—
2	(United States)	Luke Krys	Freshman	D	6' 2" (1.88 m)	185 lb (84 kg)	2000-09-27	Ridgefield, Connecticut	Salisbury School (USHS–CT)	—
3	(Canada)	Luke Albert	Freshman	D	6' 2" (1.88 m)	201 lb (91 kg)	1998-08-17	Fergus, Ontario	Bonnyville Pontiacs (AJHL)	—
4	(United States)	Anea Ferrario	Junior	D	6' 0" (1.83 m)	195 lb (88 kg)	1998-08-09	Ogden, Utah	Sioux City Musketeers (USHL)	—
5	(United States)	Ben Taylor	Junior	F	6' 3" (1.91 m)	205 lb (93 kg)	1997-04-25	Falmouth, Massachusetts	Nanaimo Clippers (BCHL)	—
6	(United States)	Tony Stillwell	Junior	D	5' 9" (1.75 m)	170 lb (77 kg)	1997-04-18	Green Bay, Wisconsin	Green Bay Gamblers (USHL)	—
7	(United States)	Justin Jallen	Sophomore	F	5' 9" (1.75 m)	178 lb (81 kg)	1998-01-06	St. Paul, Minnesota	Northeast Generals (NAHL)	—
8	(United States)	Zach Giuttari (C)	Senior	D	6' 2" (1.88 m)	190 lb (86 kg)	1996-04-17	Warwick, Rhode Island	Chilliwack Chiefs (BCHL)	—
9	(United States)	Connor Marshall	Freshman	F	5' 11" (1.8 m)	185 lb (84 kg)	1998-10-10	Parkland, Florida	Northeast Generals (NAHL)	—
10	(United States)	Jonny Russell	Freshman	F	5' 11" (1.8 m)	173 lb (78 kg)	1998-01-31	Traverse City, Michigan	Des Moines Buccaneers (USHL)	—
11	(Canada)	Nathan Plessis	Freshman	F	6' 4" (1.93 m)	205 lb (93 kg)	1998-02-28	Salmon Arm, British Columbia	Brooks Bandits (AJHL)	—
13	(United States)	Brent Beaudoin (A)	Senior	F	5' 11" (1.8 m)	180 lb (82 kg)	1996-02-29	Londonderry, New Hampshire	Islanders Hockey Club (USPHL)	—
14	(United States)	Chris Berger	Junior	F	5' 9" (1.75 m)	175 lb (79 kg)	1998-04-14	Buffalo, New York	Des Moines Buccaneers (USHL)	—
15	(United States)	Jack Gessert (A)	Senior	F	6' 2" (1.88 m)	205 lb (93 kg)	1995-01-12	Novi, Michigan	Chicago Steel (USHL)	—
16	(Canada)	Tristan Crozier	Sophomore	F	5' 11" (1.8 m)	184 lb (83 kg)	1998-02-23	Calgary, Alberta	Nanaimo Clippers (BCHL)	—
17	(Canada)	Bradley Cocca	Freshman	F	5' 8" (1.73 m)	170 lb (77 kg)	1999-08-13	Toronto, Ontario	Merritt Centennials (BCHL)	—
18	(Canada)	Jake Harris	Sophomore	F	5' 9" (1.75 m)	177 lb (80 kg)	1998-04-10	Toronto, Ontario	Nanaimo Clippers (BCHL)	—
19	(Finland)	Samuli Niinisaari	Freshman	D	6' 1" (1.85 m)	187 lb (85 kg)	1998-08-11	Hamina, Finland	Lincoln Stars (USHL)	—
20	(Norway)	Joachim Weberg	Junior	F	5' 10" (1.78 m)	175 lb (79 kg)	1996-06-21	Oslo, Norway	New Jersey Hitmen (USPHL)	—
21	(United States)	Alec Mehr	Junior	F	6' 0" (1.83 m)	195 lb (88 kg)	1997-01-11	Los Angeles, California	Bloomington Thunder (USHL)	—
22	(United States)	Matty Holmes	Freshman	F	6' 2" (1.88 m)	200 lb (91 kg)	1999-02-22	Rye, New York	Chilliwack Chiefs (BCHL)	—
23	(United States)	Luke Harrington	Sophomore	F	5' 10" (1.78 m)	175 lb (79 kg)	1998-09-02	Rye, New York	Hotchkiss School (USHS–CT)	—
24	(Canada)	Dorian Dawson	Sophomore	D	6' 2" (1.88 m)	205 lb (93 kg)	1997-05-29	Collingwood, Ontario	Sioux City Musketeers (USHL)	—
25	(United States)	Michael Maloney	Sophomore	F	5' 10" (1.78 m)	185 lb (84 kg)	1998-02-17	McHenry, Illinois	Omaha Lancers (USHL)	—
26	(United States)	James Crossman	Freshman	D	6' 3" (1.91 m)	200 lb (91 kg)	1998-11-23	Denver, Colorado	Jamestown Rebels (NAHL)	—
27	(United States)	Trey Dodd	Senior	F	5' 11" (1.8 m)	195 lb (88 kg)	1996-07-18	St. Louis, Missouri	Sioux City Musketeers (USHL)	—
28	(Canada)	Colin Burston	Junior	F	5' 10" (1.78 m)	185 lb (84 kg)	1997-03-28	Winnipeg, Manitoba	Wenatchee Wild (BCHL)	—
29	(United States)	Cole Quisenberry	Freshman	F	5' 11" (1.8 m)	180 lb (82 kg)	1999-03-22	Denver, Colorado	Chicago Steel (USHL)	—
33	(United States)	Gabriel Vinal	Sophomore	G	6' 2" (1.88 m)	185 lb (84 kg)	1999-01-12	Syracuse, New York	Aberdeen Wings (NAHL)	—
35	(United States)	Luke Kania	Junior	G	6' 2" (1.88 m)	190 lb (86 kg)	1996-01-24	Chicago, Illinois	Minnesota Wilderness (NAHL)	—

== Standings ==
2019–20 ECAC Hockey Standings
	Conference record							Overall record					
	GP	W	L	T	PTS	GF	GA	GP	W	L	T	GF	GA
#1 Cornell †	22	18	2	2	38	81	34	29	23	2	4	104	45
#7 Clarkson	22	16	5	1	33	63	38	34	23	8	3	96	63
#14 Quinnipiac	22	14	6	2	30	64	45	34	21	11	2	94	78
Rensselaer	22	13	8	1	27	63	41	34	17	15	2	95	87
Harvard	22	11	6	5	27	82	59	31	15	10	6	116	87
Dartmouth	22	10	10	2	22	60	73	31	13	14	4	93	106
Yale	22	10	10	2	22	57	64	32	15	15	2	77	97
Colgate	22	8	9	5	21	50	54	36	12	16	8	76	87
Brown	22	8	12	2	18	41	54	31	8	21	2	52	84
Union	22	5	15	2	12	46	71	37	8	25	4	67	112
Princeton	22	2	16	4	8	46	71	31	6	20	5	66	100
St. Lawrence	22	2	18	2	6	37	81	36	4	27	5	64	130
Championship: March 21, 2020 † indicates conference regular season champion (Cleary Cup) * indicates conference tournament champion (Whitelaw Cup); Rankings: USCHO.com Top 20 Poll; updated March 23, 2020

== Schedule and results ==
Date	Time	Opponent^{#}	Rank^{#}	Site	TV	Decision	Result	Attendance	Record
Regular season
November 1	7:00 PM	at Yale		Ingalls Rink • New Haven, Connecticut		Nieto	L 2–3	2,200	0–1–0 (0–1–0)
November 2	7:00 PM	vs. Yale		Meehan Auditorium • Providence, Rhode Island		Nieto	W 5–1	690	1–1–0 (1–1–0)
November 8	7:08 PM	at #4 Cornell		Lynah Rink • Ithaca, New York		Nieto	L 1–4	3,451	1–2–0 (1–2–0)
November 9	4:00 PM	at Colgate		Class of 1965 Arena • Hamilton, New York		Kania	W 4–1	1,241	2–2–0 (2–2–0)
November 15	7:00 PM	vs. #13 Harvard		Meehan Auditorium • Providence, Rhode Island		Kania	L 1–4	723	2–3–0 (2–3–0)
November 16	7:00 PM	vs. Dartmouth		Meehan Auditorium • Providence, Rhode Island		Nieto	L 1–4	489	2–4–0 (2–4–0)
November 22	7:00 PM	vs. #8 Clarkson		Meehan Auditorium • Providence, Rhode Island		Nieto	L 1–2 ^{OT}	617	2–5–0 (2–5–0)
November 23	7:00 PM	vs. St. Lawrence		Meehan Auditorium • Providence, Rhode Island		Nieto	W 3–2	557	3–5–0 (3–5–0)
November 26	7:05 PM	at Bentley*		Bentley Arena • Waltham, Massachusetts		Kania	L 0–1	1,144	3–6–0 (3–5–0)
November 30	7:00 PM	vs. #13 Providence		Schneider Arena • Providence, Rhode Island (Mayor's Cup)		Nieto	L 2–4	557	3–7–0 (3–5–0)
December 6	7:00 PM	vs. Union		Achilles Rink • Schenectady, New York		Kania	L 0–5	1,482	3–8–0 (3–6–0)
December 7	7:00 PM	vs. Rensselaer		Houston Field House • Troy, New York		Nieto	L 1–2 ^{OT}	2,101	3–9–0 (3–7–0)
December 10	7:00 PM	vs. #9 Massachusetts*		Meehan Auditorium • Providence, Rhode Island	NESN	Nieto	L 0–4	410	3–10–0 (3–7–0)
January 4	7:00 PM	at New Hampshire*		Whittemore Center • Durham, New Hampshire	NESN	Nieto	L 1–5	3,241	3–11–0 (3–7–0)
January 8	7:00 PM	at Boston University*		Agganis Arena • Boston, Massachusetts		Nieto	L 2–3 ^{OT}	2,230	3–12–0 (3–7–0)
January 11	7:05 PM	vs. #15 Arizona State*		Meehan Auditorium • Providence, Rhode Island		Nieto	L 1–3	636	3–13–0 (3–7–0)
January 12	4:00 PM	vs. #15 Arizona State*		Meehan Auditorium • Providence, Rhode Island	NESN	Nieto	L 3–4 ^{OT}	454	3–14–0 (3–7–0)
January 17	7:00 PM	vs. Rensselaer		Meehan Auditorium • Providence, Rhode Island		Nieto	L 1–3	602	3–15–0 (3–8–0)
January 18	7:00 PM	vs. Union		Meehan Auditorium • Providence, Rhode Island		Nieto	W 3–2	559	4–15–0 (4–8–0)
January 31	7:00 PM	at St. Lawrence		Appleton Arena • Canton, New York		Nieto	W 2–0	1,764	5–15–0 (5–8–0)
February 1	7:00 PM	at #6 Clarkson		Cheel Arena • Potsdam, New York		Nieto	L 1–4	2,842	5–16–0 (5–9–0)
February 7	7:00 PM	vs. Princeton		Meehan Auditorium • Providence, Rhode Island		Nieto	W 4–3	638	6–16–0 (6–9–0)
February 8	7:00 PM	vs. #16 Quinnipiac		Meehan Auditorium • Providence, Rhode Island		Nieto	T 2–2 ^{OT}	642	6–16–1 (6–9–1)
February 14	7:00 PM	at Dartmouth		Thompson Arena • Hanover, New Hampshire		Nieto	L 2–5	1,492	6–17–1 (6–10–1)
February 15	7:00 PM	at #18 Harvard		Bright-Landry Hockey Center • Boston, Massachusetts		Nieto	T 1–1 ^{OT}	2,064	6–17–2 (6–10–2)
February 21	7:00 PM	vs. Colgate		Meehan Auditorium • Providence, Rhode Island		Nieto	W 3–1	572	7–17–2 (7–10–2)
February 22	7:00 PM	vs. #2 Cornell		Meehan Auditorium • Providence, Rhode Island		Nieto	L 0–3	1,418	7–18–2 (7–11–2)
February 28	7:00 PM	at #17 Quinnipiac		People's United Center • Hamden, Connecticut		Nieto	L 1–2	3,243	7–19–2 (7–12–2)
February 29	7:00 PM	at Princeton		Hobey Baker Memorial Rink • Princeton, New Jersey		Nieto	W 2–0	2,100	8–19–2 (8–12–2)
ECAC Hockey Tournament
March 6	7:00 PM	at Colgate*		Class of 1965 Arena • Hamilton, New York (First Round Game 1)		Nieto	L 0–3	715	8–20–2 (8–12–2)
March 7	7:00 PM	at Colgate*		Class of 1965 Arena • Hamilton, New York (First Round Game 2)		Nieto	L 2–3 ^{OT}	871	8–21–2 (8–12–2)
Brown Lost Series 0–2
*Non-conference game. ^{#}Rankings from USCHO.com Poll. All times are in Eastern Time.

== Scoring statistics ==
Name	Position	Games	Goals	Assists	Points	PIM
Zach Giuttari	D	31	4	11	15	10
Brent Beaudoin	C	31	7	7	14	8
Justin Jallen	F	31	9	4	13	4
Bradley Cocca	C	31	5	5	10	10
Tony Stillwell	D	23	1	9	10	8
Luke Krys	D	31	4	5	9	26
Michael Maloney	F	31	2	7	9	25
James Crossman	D	21	2	6	8	18
Cole Quisenberry	F	28	4	3	7	12
Trey Dodd	F	30	2	5	7	4
Tristan Crozier	F	19	2	4	6	16
Joachim Weberg	LW	24	2	4	6	2
Colin Burston	LW	31	2	3	5	29
Chris Berger	LW	9	2	2	4	6
Nathan Plessis	C	22	2	2	4	40
Connor Marshall	F	11	1	3	4	0
Samueli Niinisaari	D	29	1	3	4	10
Dorian Dawson	D	30	0	3	3	8
Alec Mehr	C	22	0	1	1	4
Anea Ferrario	D	30	0	1	1	10
Gabriel Vinal	G	1	0	0	0	0
Jonny Russell	RW	3	0	0	0	2
Luke Kania	G	4	0	0	0	0
Luke Albert	D	4	0	0	0	0
Matty Holmes	F	5	0	0	0	0
Jake Harris	LW	9	0	0	0	0
Jack Gessert	LW	25	0	0	0	10
Gavin Nieto	G	28	0	0	0	0
Ben Taylor	RW	28	0	0	0	6
Bench	-	31	-	-	-	4
Total						

== Goaltending statistics ==
Name	Games	Minutes	Wins	Losses	Ties	Goals against	Saves	Shut outs	SV %	GAA
Gabriel Vinal	1	50	0	0	0	2	35	0	.946	2.37
Gavin Nieto	28	1610	7	18	2	65	695	2	.914	2.42
Luke Kania	4	212	1	3	0	11	105	0	.905	3.11
Empty Net	-	22	-	-	-	6	-	-	-	-
Total	31	1896	8	21	2	84	835	2	.909	2.66

== Rankings ==
Poll	Week																							
Poll	Pre	1	2	3	4	5	6	7	8	9	10	11	12	13	14	15	16	17	18	19	20	21	22	23 (Final)
USCHO.com	NR	NR	NR	NR	NR	NR	NR	NR	NR	NR	NR	NR	NR	NR	NR	NR	NR	NR	NR	NR	NR	NR	NR	NR
USA Today	NR	NR	NR	NR	NR	NR	NR	NR	NR	NR	NR	NR	NR	NR	NR	NR	NR	NR	NR	NR	NR	NR	NR	NR
