= 2019–20 Clarkson Golden Knights men's ice hockey season =

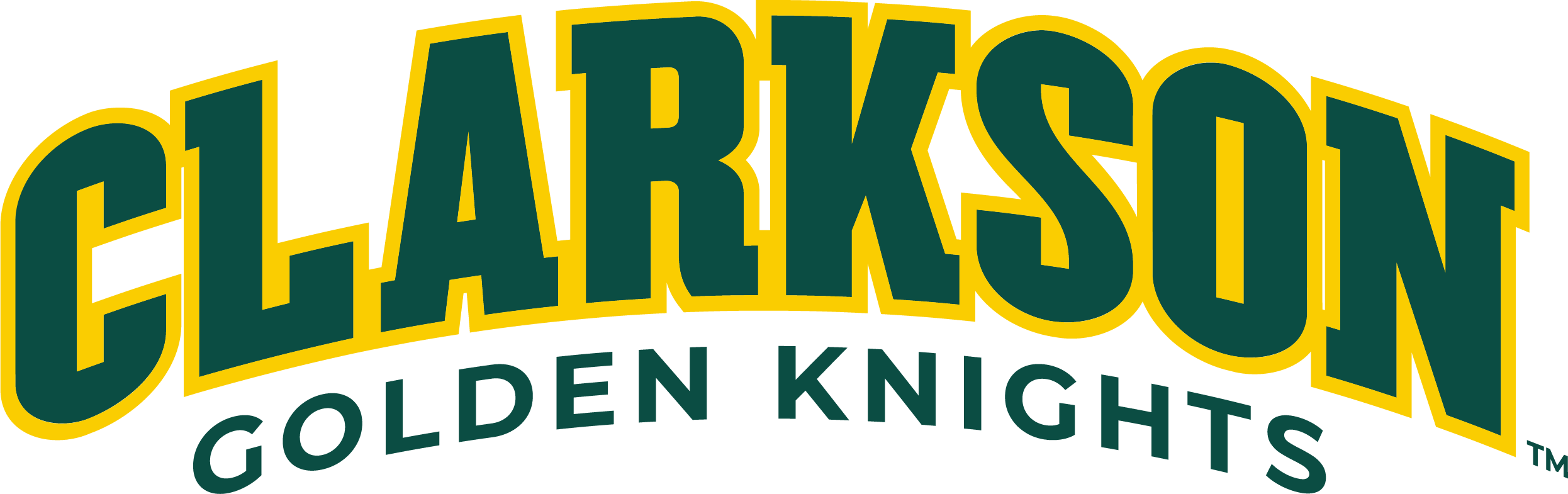
- Conference: 2nd ECAC Hockey
- Home ice: Cheel Arena

Rankings
- USCHO.com: 7
- USA Today/ US Hockey Magazine: 8

Record
- Overall: 23–8–3
- Conference: 16–5–1
- Home: 12–5–0
- Road: 11–3–3
- Neutral: 0–0–0

Coaches and captains
- Head coach: Casey Jones
- Assistant coaches: Josh Hauge; Mike Towns; Andrew Mercer
- Captain: Devin Brosseau
- Alternate captain(s): Greg Moro; Jordan Schneider; Josh Dunne

The 2019-20 Clarkson Golden Knights Men's ice hockey season was the 98th season of play for the program and the 59th season in the ECAC Hockey conference. The Golden Knights represented the Clarkson University and played their home games at Cheel Arena, and were coached by Casey Jones, in his 9th season.

On March 12, ECAC Hockey announced that the remainder of the tournament was cancelled due to the COVID-19 pandemic.

== Roster ==
As of September 12, 2019.

No.	Nat.	Player	Class	Pos	Height	Weight	DoB	Hometown	Previous team	NHL rights
2	(Canada)	Connor McCarthy	Junior	D	6' 7" (2.01 m)	238 lb (108 kg)	1996-05-07	LaSalle, Quebec	Chilliwack Chiefs (BCHL)	—
3	(Canada)	Greg Moro (A)	Senior	D	6' 4" (1.93 m)	210 lb (95 kg)	1995-10-01	Edmonton, Alberta	Lloydminster Bobcats (AJHL)	—
4	(United States)	Brian Hurley	Sophomore	D	6' 0" (1.83 m)	215 lb (98 kg)	1998-06-18	Dellwood, Minnesota	Chicago Steel (USHL)	—
5	(United States)	Michael Underwood	Sophomore	D	6' 1" (1.85 m)	198 lb (90 kg)	1998-06-07	Bloomfield Hills, Michigan	Green Bay Gamblers (USHL)	—
8	(Canada)	Chris Klack	Sophomore	F	5' 9" (1.75 m)	174 lb (79 kg)	1997-06-03	Georgetown, Ontario	Penticton Vees (BCHL)	—
9	(Canada)	Jamie Collins	Sophomore	F	5' 7" (1.7 m)	158 lb (72 kg)	1997-09-21	Fergus, Ontario	Nanaimo Clippers (BCHL)	—
10	(United States)	Shane Kuzmeski	Senior	D	6' 1" (1.85 m)	196 lb (89 kg)	1996-07-04	Grayslake, Illinois	Coulee Region Chill (NAHL)	—
11	(Canada)	Adam Tisdale	Sophomore	F	5' 9" (1.75 m)	171 lb (78 kg)	1998-11-09	Cochrane, Alberta	Dubuque Fighting Saints (USHL)	—
12	(Canada)	Jordan Schneider (A)	Senior	D	6' 4" (1.93 m)	205 lb (93 kg)	1995-02-05	Toronto, Ontario	Langley Rivermen (BCHL)	—
13	(Canada)	Mathieu Gosselin	Freshman	F	5' 10" (1.78 m)	168 lb (76 kg)	1999-05-18	Quebec City, Quebec	Merritt Centennials (BCHL)	—
14	(Canada)	Devin Brosseau (C)	Senior	F	6' 1" (1.85 m)	202 lb (92 kg)	1995-07-04	Saint-Lambert, Quebec	Nanaimo Clippers (BCHL)	—
15	(United States)	John Carter MacLean	Junior	F	6' 1" (1.85 m)	206 lb (93 kg)	1997-02-27	Basking Ridge, New Jersey	Sioux City Musketeers (USHL)	—
16	(Canada)	Jack Jacome	Junior	F	5' 7" (1.7 m)	163 lb (74 kg)	1998-12-07	Caledon, Ontario	Georgetown Raiders (OJHL)	—
18	(Latvia)	Haralds Egle	Senior	F	5' 10" (1.78 m)	193 lb (88 kg)	1996-05-11	Liepāja, Latvia	Chicago Steel (USHL)	—
19	(Canada)	Nick Campoli	Sophomore	F	5' 11" (1.8 m)	191 lb (87 kg)	1999-02-16	Toronto, Ontario	North York Rangers (OJHL)	VGK, 158th overall 2017
20	(Finland)	Jere Astrén	Junior	D	6' 0" (1.83 m)	173 lb (78 kg)	1995-05-28	Helsinki, Finland	Fargo Force (USHL)	—
21	(United States)	Josh Dunne (A)	Sophomore	F	6' 4" (1.93 m)	210 lb (95 kg)	1998-12-08	O'Fallon, Missouri	Green Bay Gamblers (USHL)	—
26	(Canada)	Grant Cooper	Junior	F	6' 0" (1.83 m)	199 lb (90 kg)	1996-07-20	Cornwall, Ontario	Cornwall Colts (CCHL)	—
27	(Canada)	Dustyn McFaul	Freshman	D	6' 2" (1.88 m)	191 lb (87 kg)	2000-08-04	Waterdown, Ontario	Pickering Panthers (OJHL)	BOS, 181st overall 2018
28	(United States)	Jordan Robert	Freshman	F	5' 10" (1.78 m)	198 lb (90 kg)	1998-03-18	Massena, New York	Cowichan Valley Capitals (BCHL)	—
29	(Canada)	Anthony Romano	Freshman	F	5' 11" (1.8 m)	185 lb (84 kg)	2000-10-07	Richmond Hill, Ontario	Sioux Falls Stampede (USHL)	ARI, 176th overall 2019
30	(United States)	Kris Oldham	Senior	G	6' 1" (1.85 m)	207 lb (94 kg)	1997-06-25	Anchorage, Alaska	Omaha (NCHC)	TBL, 153rd overall 2015
35	(Canada)	Nicholas Latinovich	Junior	G	6' 1" (1.85 m)	207 lb (94 kg)	1997-03-04	Maple, Ontario	Georgetown Raiders (USHL)	—
39	(Canada)	Zach Tsekos	Senior	F	5' 9" (1.75 m)	175 lb (79 kg)	1996-11-15	Montreal, Quebec	Sacred Heart (AHA)	—
40	(Canada)	Frank Marotte	Graduate	G	6' 1" (1.85 m)	194 lb (88 kg)	1995-05-01	Longueuil, Quebec	Robert Morris (AHA)	—
44	(United States)	Anthony Callin	Sophomore	F	6' 0" (1.83 m)	206 lb (93 kg)	1998-12-23	Middleton, Wisconsin	Madison Capitols (USHL)	—

== Standings ==
2019–20 ECAC Hockey Standings
	Conference record							Overall record					
	GP	W	L	T	PTS	GF	GA	GP	W	L	T	GF	GA
#1 Cornell †	22	18	2	2	38	81	34	29	23	2	4	104	45
#7 Clarkson	22	16	5	1	33	63	38	34	23	8	3	96	63
#14 Quinnipiac	22	14	6	2	30	64	45	34	21	11	2	94	78
Rensselaer	22	13	8	1	27	63	41	34	17	15	2	95	87
Harvard	22	11	6	5	27	82	59	31	15	10	6	116	87
Dartmouth	22	10	10	2	22	60	73	31	13	14	4	93	106
Yale	22	10	10	2	22	57	64	32	15	15	2	77	97
Colgate	22	8	9	5	21	50	54	36	12	16	8	76	87
Brown	22	8	12	2	18	41	54	31	8	21	2	52	84
Union	22	5	15	2	12	46	71	37	8	25	4	67	112
Princeton	22	2	16	4	8	46	71	31	6	20	5	66	100
St. Lawrence	22	2	18	2	6	37	81	36	4	27	5	64	130
Championship: March 21, 2020 † indicates conference regular season champion (Cleary Cup) * indicates conference tournament champion (Whitelaw Cup); Rankings: USCHO.com Top 20 Poll; updated March 23, 2020

== Schedule and results ==
Date	Time	Opponent^{#}	Rank^{#}	Site	TV	Decision	Result	Attendance	Record
Exhibition
October 5	7:00 PM	vs. Royal Military College*	#10	Cheel Arena • Potsdam, New York (Exhibition)		Marotte	W 7–0	2,643	
Regular season
October 11	7:31 PM	at Michigan*	#11	Yost Ice Arena • Ann Arbor, Michigan		Marotte	T 1–1 ^{OT}	4,826	0–0–1
October 12	7:31 PM	at Michigan*	#11	Yost Ice Arena • Ann Arbor, Michigan		Marotte	W 3–1	5,080	1–0–1
October 18	7:00 PM	vs. Vermont*	#10	Cheel Arena • Potsdam, New York		Marotte	W 3–2	3,098	2–0–1
October 19	7:30 PM	vs. #13 Providence*	#10	Cheel Arena • Potsdam, New York		Marotte	L 2–4	3,186	2–1–1
October 25	8:02 PM	vs. #6 Wisconsin*	#13	Kohl Center • Madison, Wisconsin	FSW	Marotte	W 4–0	7,811	3–1–1
October 26	8:07 PM	vs. #6 Wisconsin*	#13	Kohl Center • Madison, Wisconsin		Marotte	L 3–4	9,672	3–2–1
November 1	7:00 PM	vs. St. Lawrence*	#11	Cheel Arena • Potsdam, New York		Marotte	W 4–3 ^{OT}	2,956	4–2–1
November 2	7:00 PM	vs. St. Lawrence*	#11	Cheel Arena • Potsdam, New York		Marotte	W 3–2 ^{OT}	3,333	5–2–1
November 8	7:00 PM	at Union	#8	Achilles Rink • Schenectady, New York		Marotte	W 5–1	2,080	6–2–1 (1–0–0)
November 9	7:00 PM	at Rensselaer	#8	Houston Field House • Troy, New York		Marotte	W 2–1	3,426	7–2–1 (2–0–0)
November 15	7:00 PM	vs. #3 Cornell	#7	Cheel Arena • Potsdam, New York		Marotte	L 2–4	2,911	7–3–1 (2–1–0)
November 16	7:00 PM	vs. Colgate	#7	Cheel Arena • Potsdam, New York		Marotte	W 5–1	2,705	8–3–1 (3–1–0)
November 22	7:30 PM	at Brown	#8	Meehan Auditorium • Providence, Rhode Island		Marotte	W 2–1 ^{OT}	617	9–3–1 (4–1–0)
November 23	7:00 PM	at Yale	#8	Ingalls Rink • New Haven, Connecticut		Marotte	W 4–1	1,799	10–3–1 (5–1–0)
December 7	7:00 PM	vs. St. Lawrence	#5	Cheel Arena • Potsdam, New York		Marotte	W 3–1	3,158	11–3–1 (6–1–0)
December 13	7:07 PM	at Michigan Tech*	#4	MacInnes Student Ice Arena • Houghton, Michigan		Marotte	T 2–2 ^{OT}	2,885	11–3–2 (6–1–0)
December 14	6:07 PM	at Michigan Tech*	#4	MacInnes Student Ice Arena • Houghton, Michigan		Marotte	W 4–2	3,008	12–3–2 (6–1–0)
January 3	7:00 PM	vs. Rensselaer	#4	Cheel Arena • Potsdam, New York		Marotte	L 1–3	2,468	12–4–2 (6–2–0)
January 4	7:00 PM	vs. Union	#4	Cheel Arena • Potsdam, New York		Marotte	W 2–0	2,463	13–4–2 (7–2–0)
January 10	7:05 PM	vs. Princeton	#7	Cheel Arena • Potsdam, New York		Marotte	W 2–1	2,110	14–4–2 (8–2–0)
January 11	7:00 PM	vs. Quinnipiac	#7	Cheel Arena • Potsdam, New York		Marotte	W 5–2	2,342	15–4–2 (9–2–0)
January 17	7:00 PM	at Dartmouth	#7	Thompson Arena • Hanover, New Hampshire	NESN+	Marotte	L 2–3	2,021	15–5–2 (9–3–0)
January 18	7:00 PM	at #16 Harvard	#7	Bright-Landry Hockey Center • Boston, Massachusetts		Marotte	W 5–3	1,912	16–5–2 (10–3–0)
January 24	7:00 PM	vs. #13 Arizona State*	#8	Cheel Arena • Potsdam, New York		Marotte	W 2–1 ^{OT}	2,927	17–5–2 (10–3–0)
January 25	7:00 PM	vs. #13 Arizona State*	#8	Cheel Arena • Potsdam, New York		Marotte	L 2–3 ^{OT}	3,132	17–6–2 (10–3–0)
January 31	7:00 PM	at Yale	#6	Cheel Arena • Potsdam, New York		Marotte	W 3–1	2,467	18–6–2 (11–3–0)
February 1	7:00 PM	Brown	#6	Cheel Arena • Potsdam, New York		Marotte	W 4–1	2,842	19–6–2 (12–3–0)
February 8	7:00 PM	at St. Lawrence	#5	Appleton Arena • Canton, New York		Marotte	W 2–0	2,842	20–6–2 (13–3–0)
February 14	7:00 PM	at #15 Quinnipiac	#5	People's United Center • Hamden, Connecticut		Marotte	W 3–2	2,890	21–6–2 (14–3–0)
February 15	7:00 PM	at Princeton	#5	Hobey Baker Memorial Rink • Princeton, New Jersey		Marotte	W 3–1	2,082	22–6–2 (15–3–0)
February 21	7:00 PM	vs. #20 Harvard	#5	Cheel Arena • Potsdam, New York		Marotte	L 2–5	2,903	22–7–2 (15–4–0)
February 22	7:00 PM	vs. Dartmouth	#5	Cheel Arena • Potsdam, New York		Marotte	W 4–0	2,946	23–7–2 (16–4–0)
February 28	7:00 PM	at Colgate	#7	Class of 1965 Arena • Hamilton, New York		Marotte	T 1–1 ^{OT}	1,174	23–7–3 (16–4–1)
February 29	7:00 PM	at #1 Cornell	#7	Lynah Rink • Ithaca, New York		Marotte	L 1–5	4,267	23–8–3 (16–5–1)
ECAC Hockey Tournament
Remainder of Tournament Cancelled
*Non-conference game. ^{#}Rankings from USCHO.com Poll. All times are in Eastern Time.

== Scoring Statistics ==
Name	Position	Games	Goals	Assists	Points	PIM
Haralds Egle	RW	32	14	18	32	22
Devin Brosseau	C	28	8	21	29	20
Josh Dunne	C	32	13	14	27	30
Zack Tsekos	C	34	8	18	26	8
Connor McCarthy	D	34	9	11	20	10
Jack Jacome	RW	34	6	11	17	24
Brian Hurley	D	28	3	12	15	12
Mathieu Gosselin	F	33	2	9	11	25
Adam Tisdale	C	26	8	2	10	8
Anthony Romano	C	33	6	4	10	8
Chris Klack	C	29	5	3	8	4
Anthony Callin	F	34	4	4	8	27
Nick Campoli	C	29	2	6	8	16
Dustyn McFaul	D	31	1	6	7	14
Greg Moro	D	32	1	6	7	20
Jordan Schneider	D	34	0	7	7	43
Grant Cooper	LW	33	4	2	6	8
Shane Kuzmeski	D	26	1	5	6	12
Jamie Collins	F	24	0	4	4	4
Jere Astrén	D	7	1	1	2	16
Michael Underwood	D	34	0	2	2	28
John Carter MacLean	C	12	0	1	1	6
Kris Oldham	G	1	0	0	0	6
Jordan Robert	F	7	0	0	0	8
Frank Marotte	G	34	0	0	0	0
Bench	-	-	-	-	-	6
Total			96	167	263	379

== Goaltending statistics ==
Name	Games	Minutes	Wins	Losses	Ties	Goals against	Saves	Shut outs	SV %	GAA
Kris Oldham	1	34	0	0	0	0	15	0	1.000	0.00
Frank Marotte	34	2019	23	8	3	60	901	4	.938	1.78
Empty Net	-	10	-	-	-	3	-	-	-	-
Total	34	2064	23	8	3	63	916	4	.936	1.83

== Rankings ==
Poll	Week																							
Poll	Pre	1	2	3	4	5	6	7	8	9	10	11	12	13	14	15	16	17	18	19	20	21	22	23 (Final)
USCHO.com	10	11	10	13	11	8	7	8	6	5	4	4	4	7	7	8	6	5	5	5	7	7	7	7
USA Today	12	11	9	12	11	9	7	9	8	5	5	5	6	8	7	8	7	6	7	6	7	8	8	8

== Players drafted into the NHL ==
=== 2020 NHL entry draft ===
Round	Pick	Player	NHL Team
7	194	Noah Beck†	St. Louis Blues

† incoming freshman
