= 2019–20 Colgate Raiders men's ice hockey season =

- Conference: 8th ECAC Hockey
- Home ice: Class of 1965 Arena

Rankings
- USCHO.com: NR
- USA Today/ US Hockey Magazine: NR

Record
- Overall: 12–16–8
- Conference: 8–9–5
- Home: 7–8–4
- Road: 4–7–4
- Neutral: 1–1–0

Coaches and captains
- Head coach: Don Vaughan
- Assistant coaches: Dana Borges; Brett Riley
- Captain(s): Jared Cockrell; Bobby McMann

The 2019-20 Colgate Raiders Men's ice hockey season was the 90th season of play for the program and the 59th season in the ECAC Hockey conference. The Raiders represented the Colgate University and played their home games at Class of 1965 Arena, and were coached by Don Vaughan, in his 27th season as their head coach.

On March 12, ECAC Hockey announced that the remainder of the tournament was cancelled due to the COVID-19 pandemic.

== Roster ==
As of November 26, 2019.

No.	Nat.	Player	Class	Pos	Height	Weight	DoB	Hometown	Previous team	NHL rights
1	(Canada)	Mitch Benson	Sophomore	G	6' 1" (1.85 m)	185 lb (84 kg)	1997-11-18	Windsor, Ontario	Brooks Bandits (AJHL)	—
2	(United States)	Paul Meyer	Senior	D	6' 4" (1.93 m)	223 lb (101 kg)	1996-09-19	Edina, Minnesota	Alberni Valley Bulldogs (BCHL)	—
3	(United States)	Anthony Stark	Freshman	D	5' 9" (1.75 m)	170 lb (77 kg)	1999-04-09	New York, New York	Madison Capitols (USHL)	—
5	(United States)	Paul McAvoy	Junior	F	6' 2" (1.88 m)	200 lb (91 kg)	1996-09-17	Richmond, Kentucky	Surrey Eagles (BCHL)	—
6	(Canada)	Ross Craig	Senior	D	6' 0" (1.83 m)	200 lb (91 kg)	1996-11-01	South Glengarry, Ontario	Cornwall Colts (CCHL)	—
7	(Canada)	Josh McKechney	Junior	F	6' 1" (1.85 m)	195 lb (88 kg)	1997-05-29	Calgary, Alberta	Brooks Bandits (AJHL)	—
8	(United States)	John Snodgrass	Senior	F	6' 0" (1.83 m)	185 lb (84 kg)	1996-11-01	Eagan, Minnesota	Cedar Rapids RoughRiders (USHL)	—
9	(Canada)	Bobby McMann (C)	Senior	F	6' 1" (1.85 m)	203 lb (92 kg)	1996-06-15	Wainwright, Alberta	Bonnyville Pontiacs (AJHL)	—
10	(Canada)	Arnaud Vachon	Freshman	F	6' 2" (1.88 m)	210 lb (95 kg)	1998-05-13	Ajax, Ontario	Brooks Bandits (AJHL)	—
11	(United States)	Nick Austin	Junior	D	5' 11" (1.8 m)	185 lb (84 kg)	1997-11-17	St. Louis Park, Minnesota	Madison Capitols (USHL)	—
12	(Canada)	Colton Young	Freshman	F	6' 0" (1.83 m)	175 lb (79 kg)	1998-08-23	Calgary, Alberta	Canmore Eagles (AJHL)	—
13	(Switzerland)	Matt Verboon	Freshman	F	6' 1" (1.85 m)	195 lb (88 kg)	2000-02-23	Puplinge, Switzerland	Salmon Arm Silverbacks (BCHL)	—
14	(United States)	Jared Cockrell (C)	Senior	F	5' 11" (1.8 m)	180 lb (82 kg)	1995-08-03	Kents Hill, Maine	Brooks Bandits (AJHL)	—
15	(Canada)	Jacob Panetta	Senior	D	6' 0" (1.83 m)	187 lb (85 kg)	1996-01-26	Belleville, Ontario	Wellington Dukes (OJHL)	—
16	(United States)	Griffin Lunn	Sophomore	F	5' 10" (1.78 m)	190 lb (86 kg)	1997-11-15	Lockport, New York	Sioux Falls Stampede (USHL)	—
17	(United States)	Ben Sharf	Senior	F	5' 11" (1.8 m)	190 lb (86 kg)	1996-02-14	Williamsville, New York	Fort McMurray Oil Barons (AJHL)	—
18	(United States)	Jack Hoey	Freshman	F	6' 1" (1.85 m)	195 lb (88 kg)	1998-11-03	Fairfield, Connecticut	Choate Rosemary Hall (USHS–CT)	—
19	(United States)	Henry Marshall	Junior	F	6' 1" (1.85 m)	180 lb (82 kg)	1997-01-09	New Canaan, Connecticut	Alberni Valley Bulldogs (BCHL)	—
20	(Canada)	Ethan Manderville	Freshman	F	6' 4" (1.93 m)	200 lb (91 kg)	2000-07-01	Ottawa, Ontario	Ottawa Jr. Senators (CCHL)	—
21	(Canada)	Tyler Penner	Senior	F	5' 11" (1.8 m)	193 lb (88 kg)	1995-10-12	Winnipeg, Manitoba	Steinbach Pistons (MJHL)	—
22	(Canada)	Tyler Jeanson	Junior	F	5' 8" (1.73 m)	175 lb (79 kg)	1997-09-16	Carman, Manitoba	Minot Minotauros (NAHL)	—
23	(Canada)	Jeff Stewart	Sophomore	F	6' 3" (1.91 m)	190 lb (86 kg)	1998-02-23	Surrey, British Columbia	Surrey Eagles (BCHL)	—
24	(United States)	Trevor Cosgrove	Junior	D	6' 0" (1.83 m)	194 lb (88 kg)	1997-06-04	Exeter, New Hampshire	Alberni Valley Bulldogs (BCHL)	—
25	(Canada)	Evan Tschumi	Junior	F	6' 2" (1.88 m)	205 lb (93 kg)	1997-04-25	Calgary, Alberta	Whitecourt Wolverines (AJHL)	—
26	(Canada)	Liam Watson-Brawn	Freshman	D	6' 0" (1.83 m)	190 lb (86 kg)	1999-04-06	Vancouver, British Columbia	Prince George Spruce Kings (BCHL)	—
29	(Canada)	Nick Quillan	Junior	D	6' 0" (1.83 m)	190 lb (86 kg)	1996-06-19	Halifax, Nova Scotia	Whitecourt Wolverines (AJHL)	—
31	(Canada)	Andrew Farrier	Sophomore	G	6' 2" (1.88 m)	195 lb (88 kg)	1997-10-01	Montreal, Quebec	Kingston Voyageurs (OJHL)	—
32	(United States)	Will Friend	Sophomore	G	6' 2" (1.88 m)	165 lb (75 kg)	1999-08-02	South Hamilton, Massachusetts	The Governor's Academy (USHS–MA)	—

== Standings ==
2019–20 ECAC Hockey Standings
	Conference record							Overall record					
	GP	W	L	T	PTS	GF	GA	GP	W	L	T	GF	GA
#1 Cornell †	22	18	2	2	38	81	34	29	23	2	4	104	45
#7 Clarkson	22	16	5	1	33	63	38	34	23	8	3	96	63
#14 Quinnipiac	22	14	6	2	30	64	45	34	21	11	2	94	78
Rensselaer	22	13	8	1	27	63	41	34	17	15	2	95	87
Harvard	22	11	6	5	27	82	59	31	15	10	6	116	87
Dartmouth	22	10	10	2	22	60	73	31	13	14	4	93	106
Yale	22	10	10	2	22	57	64	32	15	15	2	77	97
Colgate	22	8	9	5	21	50	54	36	12	16	8	76	87
Brown	22	8	12	2	18	41	54	31	8	21	2	52	84
Union	22	5	15	2	12	46	71	37	8	25	4	67	112
Princeton	22	2	16	4	8	46	71	31	6	20	5	66	100
St. Lawrence	22	2	18	2	6	37	81	36	4	27	5	64	130
Championship: March 21, 2020 † indicates conference regular season champion (Cleary Cup) * indicates conference tournament champion (Whitelaw Cup); Rankings: USCHO.com Top 20 Poll; updated March 23, 2020

== Schedule and results ==
Date	Time	Opponent^{#}	Rank^{#}	Site	TV	Decision	Result	Attendance	Record
Regular season
October 5	7:30 PM	vs. RIT*		Class of 1965 Arena • Hamilton, New York		Benson	L 1–3	2,278	0–1–0
October 10	7:07 PM	at Ferris State*		Ewigleben Arena • Big Rapids, Michigan		Benson	L 1–3	1,129	0–2–0
October 13	4:00 PM	vs. #10 Boston College*		Class of 1965 Arena • Hamilton, New York		Benson	L 0–3	1,235	0–3–0
October 18	7:15 PM	at #18 Massachusetts–Lowell*		Tsongas Center • Lowell, Massachusetts		Benson	W 4–3 ^{OT}	3,964	1–3–0
October 19	6:05 PM	at #18 Massachusetts–Lowell*		Tsongas Center • Lowell, Massachusetts		Benson	T 0–0 ^{OT}	5,045	1–3–1
October 25	7:00 PM	vs. Miami*		Class of 1965 Arena • Hamilton, New York		Benson	T 3–3	1,195	1–3–2
October 26	4:00 PM	vs. Miami*		Class of 1965 Arena • Hamilton, New York		Benson	L 0–2	1,143	1–4–2
November 1	7:05 PM	at #8 Providence*		Schneider Arena • Providence, Rhode Island		Benson	T 3–3 ^{OT}	1,788	1–4–3
November 8	7:00 PM	vs. Yale		Class of 1965 Arena • Hamilton, New York		Benson	W 2–1	1,112	2–4–3 (1–0–0)
November 9	4:00 PM	vs. Brown		Class of 1965 Arena • Hamilton, New York		Benson	L 1–4	1,241	2–5–3 (1–1–0)
November 15	7:00 PM	at St. Lawrence		Roos House • Canton, New York		Benson	W 4–1	532	3–5–3 (2–1–0)
November 16	7:00 PM	at #7 Clarkson		Cheel Arena • Potsdam, New York		Benson	L 1–5	2,705	3–6–3 (2–2–0)
November 22	7:30 PM	vs. Princeton		Class of 1965 Arena • Hamilton, New York		Benson	T 2–2 ^{OT}	807	3–6–4 (2–2–1)
November 23	7:30 PM	vs. Quinnipiac		Class of 1965 Arena • Hamilton, New York		Farrier	W 3–1	769	4–6–4 (3–2–1)
Friendship Four
November 29	2:00 PM	vs. Princeton*		SSE Arena Belfast • Belfast, Northern Ireland (Friendship Four Semifinal)	NESN+	Farrier	W 3–1	3,823	5–6–4 (3–2–1)
November 30	2:00 PM	vs. #12 Northeastern*		SSE Arena Belfast • Belfast, Northern Ireland (Friendship Four Championship)	NESN+	Farrier	L 3–4	5,846	5–7–4 (3–2–1)
December 6	7:00 PM	at Dartmouth		Thompson Arena • Hanover, New Hampshire		Farrier	W 5–1	1,303	6–7–4 (4–2–1)
December 7	7:00 PM	at #12 Harvard		Bright-Landry Hockey Center • Boston, Massachusetts		Farrier	W 4–3 ^{OT}	1,611	7–7–4 (5–2–1)
December 27	7:00 PM	at #6 Ohio State*		Nationwide Arena • Columbus, Ohio		Farrier	L 2–3	4,651	7–8–4 (5–2–1)
December 28	4:00 PM	at #6 Ohio State*		Nationwide Arena • Columbus, Ohio		Benson	L 0–3	4,490	7–9–4 (5–2–1)
January 10	7:00 PM	at Union		Achilles Rink • Schenectady, New York		Farrier	W 3–2	1,885	8–9–4 (6–2–1)
January 11	7:00 PM	at Rensselaer		Houston Field House • Troy, New York		Farrier	L 0–3	2,337	8–10–4 (6–3–1)
January 24	7:00 PM	vs. #16 Harvard		Class of 1965 Arena • Hamilton, New York		Farrier	T 3–3 ^{OT}	1,421	8–10–5 (6–3–2)
January 25	7:00 PM	vs. #20 Dartmouth		Class of 1965 Arena • Hamilton, New York		Farrier	T 3–3 ^{OT}	1,093	8–10–6 (6–3–3)
January 31	7:00 PM	at Princeton		Hobey Baker Memorial Rink • Princeton, New Jersey		Farrier	W 3–0	1,888	9–10–6 (7–3–3)
February 1	7:00 PM	#18 Quinnipiac		People's United Center • Hamden, Connecticut		Farrier	L 1–2	2,893	9–11–6 (7–4–3)
February 7	7:00 PM	at #2 Cornell		Lynah Rink • Ithaca, New York		Farrier	L 1–4	2,056	9–12–6 (7–5–3)
February 8	7:00 PM	vs. #2 Cornell		Class of 1965 Arena • Hamilton, New York		Farrier	L 3–5	4,077	9–13–6 (7–6–3)
February 14	7:00 PM	vs. Rensselaer		Class of 1965 Arena • Hamilton, New York		Farrier	L 1–4	813	9–14–6 (7–7–3)
February 15	7:00 PM	vs. Union		Class of 1965 Arena • Hamilton, New York		Farrier	W 4–0	1,164	10–14–6 (8–7–3)
February 21	7:00 PM	at Brown		Meehan Auditorium • Providence, Rhode Island		Farrier	L 1–3	572	10–15–6 (8–8–3)
February 22	7:00 PM	at Yale		Ingalls Rink • New Haven, Connecticut		Farrier	L 2–4	2,777	10–16–6 (8–9–3)
February 28	7:00 PM	vs. #7 Clarkson		Class of 1965 Arena • Hamilton, New York		Benson	T 1–1	1,174	10–16–7 (8–9–4)
February 29	7:00 PM	vs. St. Lawrence		Class of 1965 Arena • Hamilton, New York		Benson	T 2–2	1,113	10–16–8 (8–9–5)
ECAC Hockey Tournament
March 6	7:00 PM	vs. Brown*		Class of 1965 Arena • Hamilton, New York (First Round Game 1)		Benson	W 3–0	715	11–16–8 (8–9–5)
March 7	7:00 PM	vs. Brown*		Class of 1965 Arena • Hamilton, New York (First Round Game 2)		Benson	W 3–2 ^{OT}	871	12–16–8 (8–9–5)
Colgate Won Series 2–0
Remainder of Tournament Cancelled
*Non-conference game. ^{#}Rankings from USCHO.com Poll. All times are in Eastern Time.

== Scoring Statistics ==
Name	Position	Games	Goals	Assists	Points	PIM
Bobby McMann	C	34	10	10	20	58
Ben Sharf	C	36	10	10	20	22
Colton Young	F	35	7	11	18	4
Paul McAvoy	F	35	9	8	17	19
Jared Cockrell	F	36	9	7	17	45
Trevor Cosgrove	D	35	0	11	11	10
Tylor Penner	RW/C	34	5	5	10	20
Griffin Lunn	F	31	4	6	10	29
Nick Austin	F/D	22	0	10	10	22
John Snodgrass	C	35	6	3	9	4
Arnaud Vachon	C	36	6	3	9	18
Jacob Panetta	D	36	3	5	8	12
Josh McKechney	F	33	3	4	7	16
Tyler Jeanson	C	25	2	4	6	4
Matt Verboon	RW/C	25	1	5	6	8
Paul Meyer	D	36	1	5	6	12
Henry Marshall	F	20	1	4	5	0
Anthony Stark	D	34	0	4	4	8
Evan Tschumi	C/D	13	1	2	3	12
Ross Craig	D	21	0	3	3	14
Jeff Stewart	LW	24	0	2	2	0
Liam Watson-Brawn	D	32	0	2	2	37
Jack Hoey	C	6	0	0	0	0
Ethan Manderville	C	8	0	0	0	0
Mitch Benson	G	18	0	0	0	0
Andrew Farrier	G	19	0	0	0	2
Bench	-	-	-	-	-	4
Total			76	127	203	380

== Goaltending statistics ==
Name	Games	Minutes	Wins	Losses	Ties	Goals against	Saves	Shut outs	SV %	GAA
Mitch Benson	18	1097	5	7	6	38	471	2	.925	2.08
Andrew Farrier	19	1102	7	9	2	43	488	2	.919	2.34
Empty Net	-	19	-	-	-	6	-	-	-	-
Total	36	2220	12	16	8	87	959	4	.917	2.35

== Rankings ==
Poll	Week																							
Poll	Pre	1	2	3	4	5	6	7	8	9	10	11	12	13	14	15	16	17	18	19	20	21	22	23 (Final)
USCHO.com	NR	NR	NR	NR	NR	NR	NR	NR	NR	NR	NR	NR	NR	NR	NR	NR	NR	NR	NR	NR	NR	NR	NR	NR
USA Today	NR	NR	NR	NR	NR	NR	NR	NR	NR	NR	NR	NR	NR	NR	NR	NR	NR	NR	NR	NR	NR	NR	NR	NR

== Players drafted into the NHL ==
=== 2020 NHL entry draft ===
Round	Pick	Player	NHL team
7	196	Alex Young†	San Jose Sharks

† incoming freshman
