= Yanni Kaldis =

Canadian ice hockey player (born 1995)

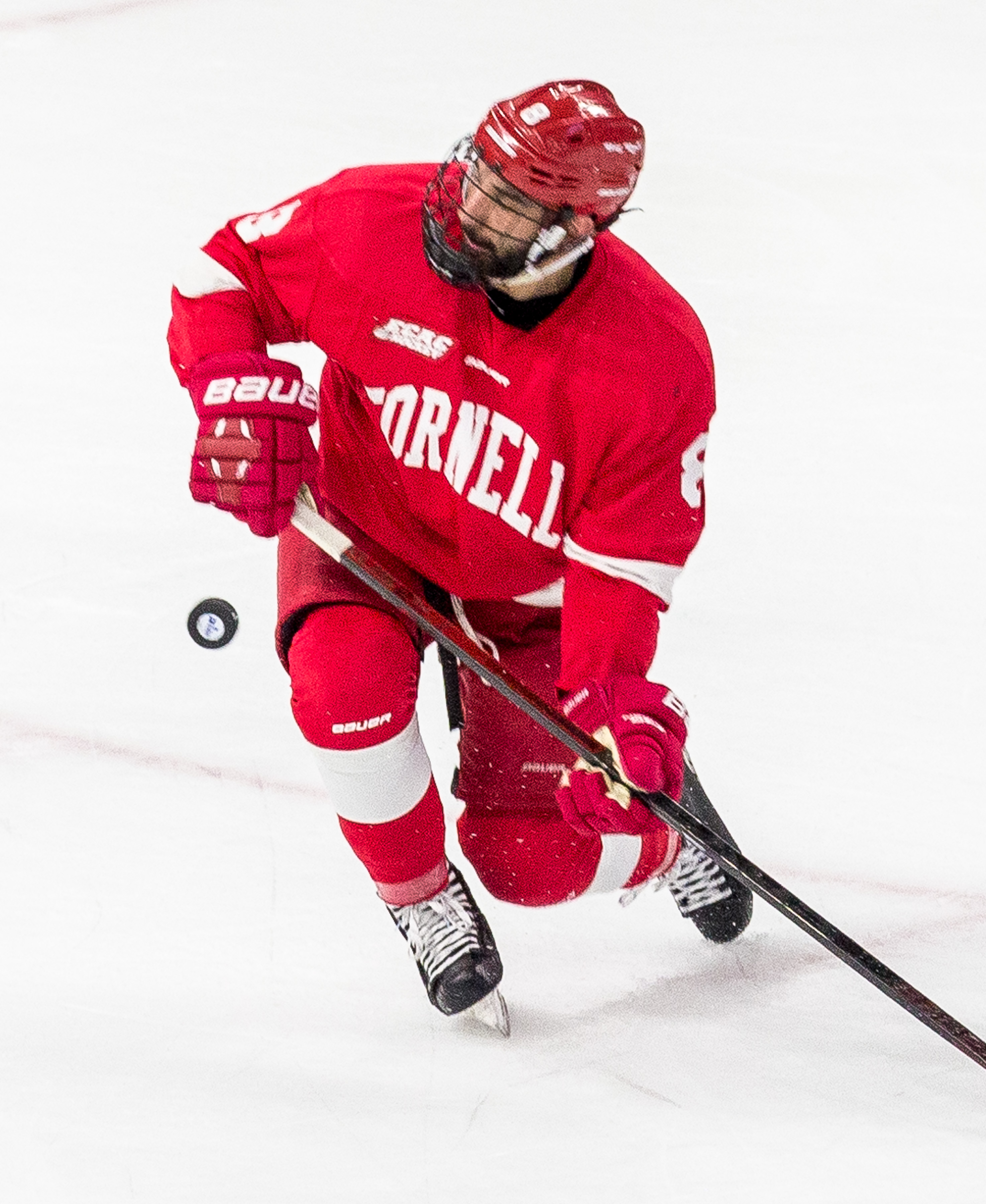
- Kaldis with Cornell in 2019
- Born: September 30, 1995 (age 31) Saint-Laurent, Quebec, Canada
- Height: 5 ft 11 in (180 cm)
- Weight: 187 lb (85 kg; 13 st 5 lb)
- Position: Defense
- Shoots: Left
- KHL team Former teams: Severstal Cherepovets; Dornbirn Bulldogs; Bakersfield Condors; Dinamo Minsk
- NHL draft: Undrafted
- Playing career: 2020–present

Yanni Kaldis (born September 30, 1995) is a Canadian professional ice hockey defenseman for Severstal Cherepovets in the Kontinental Hockey League (KHL). He was an All-American for Cornell.

== Playing career ==
Kaldis began his college career in 2016 after two very productive years of junior hockey. Against stiffer competition, his offensive numbers weren't quite as good, but Kaldis' defensive performance still earned him a spot on the ECAC All-Rookie Team. He helped Cornell reach the conference championship game that season and earn a bid to the NCAA Tournament for the first time in five years.

In his sophomore season, Kaldis showed moderate improvement offensively, but the team took a big step forward by finishing first in the conference standings. It was the program's first regular season crown in 13 years and though they stumbled come playoff time, it was a sing of things to come for the Big Red. Kaldis, himself, followed suit as a junior and ramped up his scoring. He finished third on the team and pushed the team to another regular season title. Cornell returned to the ECAC championship game and was named to the All-Tournament Team despite Cornell losing to Clarkson. Cornell made its third consecutive appearance in the NCAA Tournament and finally managed to win a game. Kaldis assisted on the opening goal and spurred on a run that ended with a 5–1 victory.

As a senior, Kaldis was named team captain and continued to produce from the back end. It was, however, his defensive exploits that allowed Cornell to be ranked as the top team in the nation towards the end of the season. Cornell ended the regular season with just 2 losses in 29 games and, with the #3 Pairwise ranking, it was a mathematical certainty that the Big Red would be selected for the NCAA Tournament for a 4th year in a row. Unfortunately, just prior to Cornell's quarterfinal match with Princeton, both Harvard and Yale withdrew from the conference tournament due to the COVID-19 pandemic. While the remaining six team held onto hope that the tournament would continue, a day later the conference announced the cancellation of the tournament.

In spite of the disappointment about how his final season with Cornell ended, Kaldis' performance earned him All-American honors and he was able to sign a two-year contract with the Bakersfield Condors after graduation. Due to a delay to the start of the following AHL season, Kaldis began the year in Austria, playing for the Dornbirn Bulldogs on loan. After joining Bakersfield, Kaldis established himself as a steady defender and helped the Condors win the Pacific Division playoffs, the only postseason title awarded that year.

Following three seasons with the Condors, Kaldis left North America and was signed to a one-year contract with Belarusian club, HC Dinamo Minsk of the KHL, on 10 July 2023.

On May 16, 2024, Kaldis continued his tenure in the KHL, joining Russian club Severstal Cherepovets on a one-year contract.

== Career statistics ==
			Regular season					Playoffs
Season	Team	League	GP	G	A	Pts	PIM	GP	G	A	Pts	PIM
2012–13	Dawson College	QCHL	32	5	12	17	30	2	0	0	0	0
2013–14	Dawson College	QCHL	33	20	18	38	59	3	0	4	4	4
2014–15	Nanaimo Clippers	BCHL	54	9	38	47	43	19	4	2	6	6
2015–16	Nanaimo Clippers	BCHL	58	9	54	63	28	14	5	7	12	12
2016–17	Cornell University	ECAC	35	1	13	14	26	—	—	—	—	—
2017–18	Cornell University	ECAC	33	4	15	19	14	—	—	—	—	—
2018–19	Cornell University	ECAC	36	4	24	28	20	—	—	—	—	—
2019–20	Cornell University	ECAC	29	5	19	24	4	—	—	—	—	—
2020–21	Dornbirn Bulldogs	ICEHL	34	2	11	13	18	—	—	—	—	—
2020–21	Bakersfield Condors	AHL	28	0	7	7	6	6	0	0	0	2
2021–22	Bakersfield Condors	AHL	53	7	24	31	28	5	0	4	4	2
2022–23	Bakersfield Condors	AHL	51	6	20	26	27	2	0	0	0	0
2023–24	Dinamo Minsk	KHL	56	7	16	23	30	6	0	1	1	0
2024–25	Severstal Cherepovets	KHL	60	3	20	23	28	5	0	0	0	6
2025–26	Severstal Cherepovets	KHL	66	11	30	41	12	5	0	3	3	2
AHL totals			132	13	51	64	61	13	0	4	4	4
KHL totals			182	21	66	87	70	16	0	4	4	8

== Awards and honors ==
Award	Year
ECAC All-Rookie Team	2016–17
All-ECAC Third Team	2017–18
All-ECAC Second Team	2018–19
ECAC All-Tournament Team	2019
All-ECAC First Team	2019–20
AHCA East Second Team All-American	2019–20
