= 2019–20 Yale Bulldogs men's ice hockey season =

College ice hockey season

- Conference: 7th ECAC Hockey
- Home ice: Ingalls Rink

Rankings
- USCHO: NR
- USA Today: NR

Record
- Overall: 15–15–2
- Conference: 10–10–2
- Home: 9–6–0
- Road: 5–8–2
- Neutral: 1–2–0

Coaches and captains
- Head coach: Keith Allain
- Assistant coaches: Josh Siembida; Ryan Donald
- Captain: Evan Smith

The 2019–20 Yale Bulldogs Men's ice hockey season was the 125th season of play for the program and the 59th season in the ECAC Hockey conference. The Bulldogs represented Yale University and were coached by Keith Allain, in his 14th season.

On March 11, Yale withdrew from the ECAC Tournament over concerns from the COVID-19 pandemic. A day later ECAC Hockey cancelled the remainder of the championship.

== Season ==
After winning their First Round match, the administration at Yale withdrew from the ECAC Tournament over health concerns due to the coronavirus pandemic.

== Departures ==
Player	Position	Nationality	Cause
Charlie Curti	Defenseman	United States	Graduation (signed with Adirondack Thunder)
Andrew Gaus	Forward	United States	Graduate Transfer (Colorado College)
Joe Snively	Center	United States	Graduation (signed with Hershey Bears)
Sam Tucker	Goaltender	United States	Graduate Transfer (Boston University)
Anthony Walsh	Defenseman	United States	Graduation (Retired)

== Recruiting ==
Player	Position	Nationality	Age
Cole Donhauser	Forward	United States	19
Connor Hopkins	Goaltender	United States	19
Quinton Ong	Forward	Canada	20
Hayden Rowan	Forward	United States	20
Brandon Tabakin	Defenseman	United States	19
Teddy Wooding	Forward	United States	19
Michael Young	Defenseman	United States	21

== Roster ==
As of July 12, 2019.

No.	Nat.	Player	Class	Pos	Height	Weight	DoB	Hometown	Previous team	NHL rights
1	(United States)	Connor Hopkins	Freshman	G	6' 1" (1.85 m)	185 lb (84 kg)	2000-03-09	Malden, Massachusetts	West Kelowna Warriors (BCHL)	—
2	(United States)	Jack St. Ivany	Sophomore	D	6' 2" (1.88 m)	195 lb (88 kg)	1999-07-22	Manhattan Beach, California	Sioux Falls Stampede (USHL)	PHI, 112th overall 2018
3	(United States)	Michael Young	Freshman	D	6' 1" (1.85 m)	210 lb (95 kg)	1998-08-21	Medford, Massachusetts	Vernon Vipers (BCHL)	—
4	(United States)	Matt Foley	Senior	D	6' 1" (1.85 m)	198 lb (90 kg)	1995-04-20	Longmeadow, Massachusetts	Bloomington Thunder (USHL)	—
5	(United States)	Brian Matthews	Junior	D	6' 0" (1.83 m)	195 lb (88 kg)	1998-04-21	Marshfield, Massachusetts	Omaha Lancers (USHL)	—
6	(United States)	Billy Sweezey	Senior	D	6' 2" (1.88 m)	204 lb (93 kg)	1996-02-06	Hanson, Massachusetts	Chicago Steel (USHL)	—
7	(United States)	Brandon Tabakin	Freshman	D	5' 10" (1.78 m)	160 lb (73 kg)	2000-05-21	Woodbury, New York	Sioux Falls Stampede (USHL)	—
8	(United States)	Will D'Orsi	Senior	F	5' 11" (1.8 m)	180 lb (82 kg)	1997-01-07	Sudbury, Massachusetts	Lincoln Stars (USHL)	—
9	(Canada)	Robbie DeMontis	Senior	F	5' 9" (1.75 m)	170 lb (77 kg)	1996-02-17	Kleinburg, Ontario	Muskegon Lumberjacks (USHL)	—
10	(United States)	Chandler Lindstrand	Senior	D	6' 0" (1.83 m)	195 lb (88 kg)	1996-02-21	Medina, Minnesota	Des Moines Buccaneers (USHL)	—
12	(United States)	Dante Palecco	Junior	F	5' 11" (1.8 m)	185 lb (84 kg)	1998-04-18	Whippany, New Jersey	Green Bay Gamblers (USHL)	—
13	(Canada)	Evan Smith (C)	Senior	F	6' 0" (1.83 m)	190 lb (86 kg)	1996-08-28	Stouffville, Ontario	Dubuque Fighting Saints (USHL)	—
14	(Canada)	Mitchell Smith	Senior	F	5' 11" (1.8 m)	185 lb (84 kg)	1996-08-28	Stouffville, Ontario	Dubuque Fighting Saints (USHL)	—
15	(Canada)	Kyle Johnson	Sophomore	F	5' 11" (1.8 m)	180 lb (82 kg)	1998-06-03	Port Moody, British Columbia	Prince George Spruce Kings (BCHL)	—
16	(United States)	Teddy Wooding	Freshman	F	5' 11" (1.8 m)	180 lb (82 kg)	1999-12-30	Wrentham, Massachusetts	Vernon Vipers (BCHL)	—
17	(United States)	Kevin O'Neil	Junior	F	5' 11" (1.8 m)	175 lb (79 kg)	1998-02-23	Latham, New York	Madison Capitols (USHL)	—
18	(United States)	Justin Pearson	Sophomore	F	6' 1" (1.85 m)	185 lb (84 kg)	1998-05-17	Nashua, New Hampshire	Islanders Hockey Club (NCDC)	—
19	(Canada)	Quinton Ong	Freshman	F	5' 9" (1.75 m)	170 lb (77 kg)	1999-07-23	Saskatoon, Saskatchewan	Canmore Eagles (AJHL)	—
20	(United States)	Curtis Hall	Sophomore	F	6' 3" (1.91 m)	197 lb (89 kg)	2000-04-26	Chagrin Falls, Ohio	Youngstown Phantoms (USHL)	BOS, 119th overall 2018
21	(Canada)	Tyler Welsh	Junior	F	5' 9" (1.75 m)	165 lb (75 kg)	1997-03-17	Whistler, British Columbia	Victoria Grizzlies (BCHL)	—
22	(United States)	Hayden Rowan	Freshman	F	5' 9" (1.75 m)	175 lb (79 kg)	1999-01-22	Pemberville, Ohio	Trail Smoke Eaters (BCHL)	—
23	(United States)	Cole Donhauser	Freshman	F	5' 11" (1.8 m)	180 lb (82 kg)	1999-12-27	Buffalo, New York	Chilliwack Chiefs (BCHL)	—
24	(United States)	Graham Lillibridge	Sophomore	D	5' 9" (1.75 m)	160 lb (73 kg)	1999-01-29	Geneva, Illinois	Chicago Steel (USHL)	—
25	(United States)	Phil Kemp	Junior	D	6' 3" (1.91 m)	200 lb (91 kg)	1999-02-12	Greenwich, Connecticut	USNTDP (USHL)	EDM, 208th overall 2017
26	(Canada)	Brett Jewell	Junior	F	6' 2" (1.88 m)	195 lb (88 kg)	1996-11-09	Vernon, British Columbia	Merritt Centennials (BCHL)	—
27	(United States)	Luke Stevens	Senior	F	6' 4" (1.93 m)	212 lb (96 kg)	1997-02-11	Duxbury, Massachusetts	Noble & Greenough School (USHS–MA)	CAR, 126th overall 2015
29	(United States)	Nicholas MacNab	Junior (RS)	G	6' 2" (1.88 m)	185 lb (84 kg)	1996-07-15	Indianapolis, Indiana	Des Moines Buccaneers (USHL)	—
33	(United States)	Corbin Kaczperski	Senior (RS)	G	6' 3" (1.91 m)	185 lb (84 kg)	1996-03-02	China Township, Michigan	Lone Star Brahmas (NAHL)	—

== Standings ==
2019–20 ECAC Hockey Standings
	Conference record							Overall record					
	GP	W	L	T	PTS	GF	GA	GP	W	L	T	GF	GA
#1 Cornell †	22	18	2	2	38	81	34	29	23	2	4	104	45
#7 Clarkson	22	16	5	1	33	63	38	34	23	8	3	96	63
#14 Quinnipiac	22	14	6	2	30	64	45	34	21	11	2	94	78
Rensselaer	22	13	8	1	27	63	41	34	17	15	2	95	87
Harvard	22	11	6	5	27	82	59	31	15	10	6	116	87
Dartmouth	22	10	10	2	22	60	73	31	13	14	4	93	106
Yale	22	10	10	2	22	57	64	32	15	15	2	77	97
Colgate	22	8	9	5	21	50	54	36	12	16	8	76	87
Brown	22	8	12	2	18	41	54	31	8	21	2	52	84
Union	22	5	15	2	12	46	71	37	8	25	4	67	112
Princeton	22	2	16	4	8	46	71	31	6	20	5	66	100
St. Lawrence	22	2	18	2	6	37	81	36	4	27	5	64	130
Championship: March 21, 2020 † indicates conference regular season champion (Cleary Cup) * indicates conference tournament champion (Whitelaw Cup); Rankings: USCHO.com Top 20 Poll; updated March 23, 2020

== Schedule and results ==
Date	Time	Opponent^{#}	Rank^{#}	Site	TV	Decision	Result	Attendance	Record
Exhibition
October 26	7:00 PM	at Princeton		Hobey Baker Memorial Rink • Princeton, New Jersey (Exhibition)					
Regular season
November 1	7:00 PM	vs. Brown		Ingalls Rink • New Haven, Connecticut		Kaczperski	W 3–2	2,200	1–0–0 (1–0–0)
November 2	7:00 PM	at Brown		Meehan Auditorium • Providence, Rhode Island		Kaczperski	L 1–5	690	1–1–0 (1–1–0)
November 8	7:08 PM	at Colgate		Class of 1965 Arena • Hamilton, New York		Kaczperski	L 1–2	1,112	1–2–0 (1–2–0)
November 9	4:00 PM	at #4 Cornell		Lynah Rink • Ithaca, New York		Kaczperski	L 2–6	4,117	1–3–0 (1–3–0)
November 15	7:00 PM	vs. Dartmouth		Ingalls Rink • New Haven, Connecticut		Kaczperski	L 3–4	1,842	1–4–0 (1–4–0)
November 16	7:00 PM	vs. #13 Harvard		Ingalls Rink • New Haven, Connecticut		Kaczperski	L 1–6	3,077	1–5–0 (1–5–0)
November 22	7:00 PM	vs. St. Lawrence		Ingalls Rink • New Haven, Connecticut		MacNab	W 6–3	1,910	2–5–0 (2–5–0)
November 23	7:00 PM	vs. #8 Clarkson		Ingalls Rink • New Haven, Connecticut		MacNab	L 1–4	1,799	2–6–0 (2–6–0)
November 26	7:05 PM	at #14 Boston College*		Conte Forum • Chestnut Hill, Massachusetts		MacNab	L 2–6	3,669	2–7–0 (2–6–0)
December 6	7:00 PM	vs. Rensselaer		Houston Field House • Troy, New York		Kaczperski	W 4–1	1,718	3–7–0 (3–6–0)
December 7	7:00 PM	vs. Union		Achilles Rink • Schenectady, New York		Kaczperski	W 2–0	1,614	4–7–0 (4–6–0)
December 10	7:00 PM	vs. Maine*		Ingalls Rink • New Haven, Connecticut	NESN+	Kaczperski	W 3–1	1,472	5–7–0 (4–6–0)
December 29	4:00 PM	vs. McGill*		Ingalls Rink • New Haven, Connecticut (Exhibition)		Kaczperski	W 4–1	1,629	
January 3	7:00 PM	at New Hampshire*		Whittemore Center • Durham, New Hampshire	NESN	Kaczperski	L 1–4	3,575	5–8–0 (4–6–0)
January 7	7:05 PM	at Vermont*		Gutterson Fieldhouse • Burlington, Vermont		Kaczperski	W 3–2 ^{OT}	2,550	6–8–0 (4–6–0)
January 11	7:00 PM	vs. #18 Harvard*		Madison Square Garden • New York, New York		Kaczperski	L 0–7	10,064	6–9–0 (4–6–0)
January 17	7:00 PM	vs. Union		Ingalls Rink • New Haven, Connecticut		Kaczperski	W 5–0	1,944	7–9–0 (5–6–0)
January 18	7:00 PM	vs. Rensselaer		Ingalls Rink • New Haven, Connecticut		Kaczperski	W 4–1	2,174	8–9–0 (6–6–0)
Connecticut Ice
January 25	7:30 PM	at Sacred Heart*		Webster Bank Arena • Bridgeport, Connecticut (Connecticut Ice Semifinal)	SNY	Kaczperski	L 2–6	5,724	8–10–0 (6–6–0)
January 26	3:30 PM	vs. Connecticut*		Webster Bank Arena • Bridgeport, Connecticut (Connecticut Ice Third Place)	SNY	Kaczperski	W 3–2	4,631	9–10–0 (6–6–0)
January 31	7:00 PM	at #6 Clarkson		Cheel Arena • Potsdam, New York		Kaczperski	L 1–3	2,467	9–11–0 (6–7–0)
February 1	7:00 PM	at St. Lawrence		Appleton Arena • Canton, New York		Kaczperski	T 2–2 ^{OT}	1,392	9–11–1 (6–7–1)
February 7	7:00 PM	vs. #16 Quinnipiac		Ingalls Rink • New Haven, Connecticut		Kaczperski	L 2–3 ^{OT}	3,268	9–12–1 (6–8–1)
February 8	7:00 PM	vs. Princeton		Ingalls Rink • New Haven, Connecticut		Kaczperski	W 5–3	2,805	10–12–1 (7–8–1)
February 14	7:00 PM	at #18 Harvard		Bright-Landry Hockey Center • Boston, Massachusetts	NESN	Kaczperski	T 4–4 ^{OT}	2,079	10–12–2 (7–8–2)
February 15	7:00 PM	at Dartmouth		Thompson Arena • Hanover, New Hampshire		Kaczperski	W 4–3	2,469	11–12–2 (8–8–2)
February 21	7:00 PM	vs. #2 Cornell		Ingalls Rink • New Haven, Connecticut		Kaczperski	L 0–4	3,015	11–13–2 (8–9–2)
February 22	7:00 PM	vs. Colgate		Ingalls Rink • New Haven, Connecticut		Kaczperski	W 4–2	2,777	12–13–2 (9–9–2)
February 28	7:00 PM	at Princeton		Hobey Baker Memorial Rink • Princeton, New Jersey		Kaczperski	W 2–1	1,851	13–13–2 (10–9–2)
February 29	7:00 PM	at #17 Quinnipiac		People's United Center • Hamden, Connecticut		Kaczperski	L 0–5	3,625	13–14–2 (10–10–2)
ECAC Hockey Tournament
March 6	7:00 PM	vs. Union*		Ingalls Rink • New Haven, Connecticut (First Round Game 1)		Kaczperski	L 0–3	700	13–15–2 (10–10–2)
March 7	7:00 PM	vs. Union*		Ingalls Rink • New Haven, Connecticut (First Round Game 2)		Kaczperski	W 4–1	850	14–15–2 (10–10–2)
March 8	7:00 PM	vs. Union*		Ingalls Rink • New Haven, Connecticut (First Round Game 3)		Kaczperski	W 2–1 ^{2OT}	700	15–15–2 (10–10–2)
Yale Won Series 2–1
Withdrew from Tournament
*Non-conference game. ^{#}Rankings from USCHO.com Poll. All times are in Eastern Time.

== Scoring statistics ==
Name	Position	Games	Goals	Assists	Points	PIM
Curtis Hall	C	28	17	10	27	39
Justin Pearson	F	31	14	10	24	16
Tyler Welsh	F	32	8	15	23	14
Kevin O'Neil	RW	32	5	12	17	10
Jack St. Ivany	D	32	1	15	16	18
Luke Stevens	LW	31	7	5	12	25
Phil Kemp	D	32	3	8	11	10
Evan Smith	C//LW	28	2	7	9	14
Dante Palecco	LW	28	5	3	8	6
Graham Lillibridge	D	32	1	7	8	4
Billy Sweezey	D	32	0	8	8	47
Mitchell Smith	LW	30	3	4	7	12
Will D'Orsi	C	31	3	4	7	12
Cole Donhauser	F	23	2	3	5	10
Brett Jewell	RW	20	2	2	4	38
Matt Foley	D	21	0	4	4	4
Hayden Rowan	LW	20	1	2	3	8
Chandler Lindstrand	D	32	1	2	3	16
Brandon Tabakin	D	17	0	3	3	0
Quinton Ong	RW	8	0	2	2	2
Michael Young	D	15	1	0	1	2
Teddy Wooding	F	25	1	0	1	4
Corbin Kaczperski	G	30	0	1	1	15
Robbie DeMontis	LW	6	0	0	0	2
Nicholas MacNab	G	7	0	0	0	0
Brian Matthews	D	11	0	0	0	0
Kyle Johnson	F	11	0	0	0	0
Bench	-	32	-	-	-	4
Total						

== Goaltending statistics ==
Name	Games	Minutes	Wins	Losses	Ties	Goals against	Saves	Shut outs	SV %	GAA
Corbin Kaczperski	30	1734	14	13	2	80	743	2	.903	2.77
Nicholas MacNab	7	213	1	2	0	13	86	0	.869	3.65
Empty Net	-	7	-	-	-	4	-	-	-	-
Total	32	1956	15	15	2	97	829	2	.895	2.97

== Rankings ==
Poll	Week																							
Poll	Pre	1	2	3	4	5	6	7	8	9	10	11	12	13	14	15	16	17	18	19	20	21	22	23 (Final)
USCHO.com	NR	NR	NR	NR	NR	NR	NR	NR	NR	NR	NR	NR	NR	NR	NR	NR	NR	NR	NR	NR	NR	NR	NR	NR
USA Today	NR	NR	NR	NR	NR	NR	NR	NR	NR	NR	NR	NR	NR	NR	NR	NR	NR	NR	NR	NR	NR	NR	NR	NR

== Awards and honors ==
=== ECAC Hockey ===
Honor	Player	Position
All-ECAC Hockey Second Team	Curtis Hall	Forward

== Players drafted into the NHL ==
=== 2020 NHL entry draft ===
No Yale players were selected in the NHL draft.
