= 2020 ECAC Hockey men's ice hockey tournament =

2020 ECAC Men's ice hockey tournament
- Dates: March 6–21, 2020
- Teams: 12
- Finals site: Herb Brooks Arena; Lake Placid, New York
- Champions: Tournament Canceled ( title)
- ECAC Men's Ice Hockey Tournaments

The 2020 ECAC Hockey Men's Ice Hockey Tournament was the 59th tournament in league history. It was scheduled to be played between March 6 and March 21, 2020. First Round and Quarterfinal games were played at home team campus sites, while the Semifinal and Championship games were to be played at the Herb Brooks Arena in Lake Placid, New York.

On Sunday, March 8, 2020 Rensselaer announced that their quarterfinal series against Harvard scheduled for March 13–15 would be played without fans in attendance due to the COVID-19 pandemic. Three days later, on March 11, it was announced that Harvard would not allow their team to travel to Rensselaer and withdrew from the tournament due to coronavirus fears. Yale also withdrew from the tournament on March 11 and it was decided to reseed the tournament with Cornell and Clarkson being given byes to the semifinals. Previously on March 10, 2020 Cornell had announced that fans would not be allowed at their quarterfinal series against Princeton. On March 12, ECAC Hockey announced that the remainder of the tournament was cancelled due to the COVID-19 pandemic.

== Format ==
The tournament features four rounds of play. The teams that finish above fifth place in the standings received a bye to the quarterfinal round. In the first round, the fifth and twelfth seeds, the sixth and eleventh seeds, the seventh and tenth seeds and the eighth and ninth seeds played a best-of-three series with the winners advancing to the quarterfinals. In the quarterfinals the one seed played the lowest remaining seed, the second seed played the second-lowest remaining seed, the third seed played the third-lowest remaining seed and the fourth seed played the fourth-lowest remaining seed in another best-of-three series with the winners of these the series advancing to the semifinals. In the semifinals the top remaining seed played the lowest remaining seed while the two remaining teams play against each other. The winners of the semifinals play in the championship game, and no third-place game is played. All series after the quarterfinals are single-elimination games. The tournament champion receives an automatic bid to the 2020 NCAA Division I Men's Ice Hockey Tournament.

== Conference standings ==
2019–20 ECAC Hockey Standings
	Conference record							Overall record					
	GP	W	L	T	PTS	GF	GA	GP	W	L	T	GF	GA
#1 Cornell †	22	18	2	2	38	81	34	29	23	2	4	104	45
#7 Clarkson	22	16	5	1	33	63	38	34	23	8	3	96	63
#14 Quinnipiac	22	14	6	2	30	64	45	34	21	11	2	94	78
Rensselaer	22	13	8	1	27	63	41	34	17	15	2	95	87
Harvard	22	11	6	5	27	82	59	31	15	10	6	116	87
Dartmouth	22	10	10	2	22	60	73	31	13	14	4	93	106
Yale	22	10	10	2	22	57	64	32	15	15	2	77	97
Colgate	22	8	9	5	21	50	54	36	12	16	8	76	87
Brown	22	8	12	2	18	41	54	31	8	21	2	52	84
Union	22	5	15	2	12	46	71	37	8	25	4	67	112
Princeton	22	2	16	4	8	46	71	31	6	20	5	66	100
St. Lawrence	22	2	18	2	6	37	81	36	4	27	5	64	130
Championship: March 21, 2020 † indicates conference regular season champion (Cleary Cup) * indicates conference tournament champion (Whitelaw Cup); Rankings: USCHO.com Top 20 Poll; updated March 23, 2020

== Bracket ==
Teams are reseeded for the Quarterfinals and Semifinals. Bracket below represents tournament as it was to be played just prior to cancellation, after Harvard and Yale had withdrawn.

First Round; March 6–8
5	Harvard	5	7	—
12	St. Lawrence	3	1	—
6	Dartmouth	3	4	—
11	Princeton	4*	5*	—
7	Yale	0	4	2**
10	Union	3	1	1
8	Colgate	3	3*	—
9	Brown	0	2	—

Quarterfinals; March 13–15
3	Quinnipiac
11	Princeton
4	Rensselaer
8	Colgate

Semifinals; March 20
1	Cornell
2	Clarkson

Championship; March 21

Note: * denotes overtime period(s)
