= 2019–20 Princeton Tigers men's ice hockey season =

- Conference: 11th ECAC Hockey
- Home ice: Hobey Baker Memorial Rink

Rankings
- USCHO.com: NR
- USA Today/ US Hockey Magazine: NR

Record
- Overall: 6–20–5
- Conference: 2–16–4
- Home: 2–10–2
- Road: 4–8–3
- Neutral: 0–2–0

Coaches and captains
- Head coach: Ron Fogarty
- Assistant coaches: Brad Dexter; Stavros Paskaris
- Captain: Derek Topatigh
- Alternate captain(s): Jackson Cressey; Liam Grande

The 2019-20 Princeton Tigers Men's ice hockey season was the 118th season of play for the program and the 59th season in the ECAC Hockey conference. The Tigers represented the Princeton University and played their home games at the Hobey Baker Memorial Rink, and were coached by Ron Fogarty, in his 6th season.

On March 12 ECAC Hockey announced that the remainder of the tournament was cancelled due to the COVID-19 pandemic.

== Departures ==
Player	Position	Nationality	Cause
Josh Teves	Defenseman	Canada	Graduation (signed with Vancouver Canucks)
Alex Riche	Forward	Canada	Graduation (signed with HC Kunlun Red Star)
Spencer Kryczka	Forward	Canada	Graduation (signed with Fort Worth Barracudas)
Max Veronneau	Forward	Canada	Graduation (signed with Ottawa Senators)
Ryan Kuffner	Forward	Canada	Graduation (signed with Detroit Red Wings)
Austin Shaw	Goaltender	United States	Graduate Transfer (Ferris State)

== Recruiting ==
Player	Position	Nationality	Age	Notes
Liam Gorman	Forward	United States	19	Boston, MA; Selected 177th overall in 2018 NHL entry draft
Matt Hayami	Forward	Canada	19	Oakville, ON
Spencer Kersten	Forward	Canada	19	Oakville, ON
Aidan Porter	Goaltender	United States	20	Boston, MA
Adam Robbins	Forward	United States	19	Alpine, NJ
Nick Seitz	Forward	United States	19	New York, NY
Pito Walton	Defenseman	United States	19	Peapack, NJ

== Roster ==
As of July 10, 2019.

No.	Nat.	Player	Class	Pos	Height	Weight	DoB	Hometown	Previous team	NHL rights
1	(Canada)	Jérémie Forget	Sophomore	G	6' 1" (1.85 m)	185 lb (84 kg)	1997-10-15	Mascouche, Quebec	Carleton Place Canadians (CCHL)	—
2	(United States)	Mike Ufberg	Sophomore	D	5' 9" (1.75 m)	180 lb (82 kg)	1997-09-24	Richboro, Pennsylvania	Vernon Vipers (BCHL)	—
5	(Canada)	Mark Paolini	Junior	D	6' 0" (1.83 m)	180 lb (82 kg)	1998-03-06	Toronto, Ontario	St. Michael's Buzzers (OJHL)	—
6	(Canada)	Matt Kellenberger	Sophomore	D	6' 1" (1.85 m)	185 lb (84 kg)	1999-01-11	Toronto, Ontario	Oakville Blades (OJHL)	—
7	(Canada)	Liam Grande (A)	Sophomore	F	5' 10" (1.78 m)	185 lb (84 kg)	1996-05-07	Whitby, Ontario	Cobourg Cougars (OJHL)	—
8	(Canada)	Sami Pharaon	Sophomore	D	5' 10" (1.78 m)	170 lb (77 kg)	1999-05-28	North Vancouver, British Columbia	Alberni Valley Bulldogs (BCHL)	—
9	(United States)	Joey Fallon	Senior	F	5' 7" (1.7 m)	175 lb (79 kg)	1995-12-26	West Islip, New York	Lone Star Brahmas (NAHL)	—
10	(Canada)	Jackson Cressey (A)	Senior	F	6' 0" (1.83 m)	180 lb (82 kg)	1996-01-22	West Vancouver, British Columbia	Coquitlam Express (BCHL)	—
11	(United States)	Adam Robbins	Freshman	F	5' 8" (1.73 m)	155 lb (70 kg)	2000-04-12	New York, New York	Chicago Steel (USHL)	—
12	(Canada)	Jordan Fogarty	Senior	F	5' 8" (1.73 m)	180 lb (82 kg)	1995-11-03	Sarnia, Ontario	Sarnia Legionnaires (GOJHL)	—
13	(United States)	Nick Seitz	Freshman	F	6' 1" (1.85 m)	190 lb (86 kg)	2000-01-18	Manhattan, New York	Corpus Christi IceRays (NAHL)	—
14	(United States)	Liam Gorman	Freshman	F	6' 3" (1.91 m)	197 lb (89 kg)	2000-05-08	Arlington, Massachusetts	Saint Sebastian's School (USHS–MA)	PIT, 177th overall 2018
15	(Canada)	Spencer Kersten	Freshman	F	5' 10" (1.78 m)	185 lb (84 kg)	2000-05-16	Waterloo, Ontario	Oakville Blades (OJHL)	—
16	(Canada)	Finn Evans	Sophomore	F	6' 4" (1.93 m)	185 lb (84 kg)	1999-08-21	Toronto, Ontario	Ottawa Jr. Senators (CCHL)	—
17	(Canada)	Reid Yochim	Junior	D	5' 7" (1.7 m)	180 lb (82 kg)	1998-06-21	Port Robinson, Ontario	Langley Rivermen (BCHL)	—
18	(Canada)	Matt Hayami	Freshman	F	5' 10" (1.78 m)	185 lb (84 kg)	2000-05-21	Oakville, Ontario	Markham Royals (OJHL)	—
19	(Canada)	Neil Doef	Junior	F	5' 11" (1.8 m)	175 lb (79 kg)	1997-02-10	Smiths Falls, Ontario	Smiths Falls Bears (CCHL)	—
20	(United States)	Christian O'Neill	Sophomore	F	5' 11" (1.8 m)	175 lb (79 kg)	1998-06-17	Westwood, Massachusetts	Omaha Lancers (USHL)	—
21	(United States)	Pito Walton	Freshman	D	6' 2" (1.88 m)	192 lb (87 kg)	2000-03-17	Peapack, New Jersey	Coquitlam Express (BCHL)	—
22	(Canada)	Colin Tonge	Junior	F	5' 10" (1.78 m)	185 lb (84 kg)	1998-02-10	Kingston, Ontario	Brockville Braves (CCHL)	—
23	(United States)	Jeremy Germain	Senior	F	6' 0" (1.83 m)	185 lb (84 kg)	1996-08-15	Hamden, Connecticut	Chilliwack Chiefs (BCHL)	—
24	(Canada)	Matthew Thom	Junior	D	6' 3" (1.91 m)	200 lb (91 kg)	1998-05-18	Oakville, Ontario	Georgetown Raiders (OJHL)	—
25	(Canada)	Luke Keenan	Junior	F	6' 1" (1.85 m)	196 lb (89 kg)	1998-07-22	Courtice, Ontario	Whitby Fury (OJHL)	—
26	(United States)	Jake Paganelli	Junior	F	5' 11" (1.8 m)	175 lb (79 kg)	1997-03-28	Verona, New Jersey	Fargo Force (USHL)	—
27	(Canada)	Corey Andonovski	Sophomore	F	6' 1" (1.85 m)	195 lb (88 kg)	1999-03-26	Uxbridge, Ontario	Chilliwack Chiefs (BCHL)	—
28	(Canada)	Derek Topatigh (C)	Senior	D	5' 11" (1.8 m)	185 lb (84 kg)	1997-03-03	Mississauga, Ontario	Orangeville Flyers (OJHL)	—
30	(United States)	Ryan Ferland	Junior	G	6' 0" (1.83 m)	175 lb (79 kg)	1998-02-11	Franklin, Massachusetts	New Jersey Titans (NAHL)	—
35	(United States)	Aidan Porter	Freshman	G	6' 2" (1.88 m)	180 lb (82 kg)	1999-05-18	Weston, Massachusetts	Vernon Vipers (BCHL)	—

== Standings ==
2019–20 ECAC Hockey Standings
	Conference record							Overall record					
	GP	W	L	T	PTS	GF	GA	GP	W	L	T	GF	GA
#1 Cornell †	22	18	2	2	38	81	34	29	23	2	4	104	45
#7 Clarkson	22	16	5	1	33	63	38	34	23	8	3	96	63
#14 Quinnipiac	22	14	6	2	30	64	45	34	21	11	2	94	78
Rensselaer	22	13	8	1	27	63	41	34	17	15	2	95	87
Harvard	22	11	6	5	27	82	59	31	15	10	6	116	87
Dartmouth	22	10	10	2	22	60	73	31	13	14	4	93	106
Yale	22	10	10	2	22	57	64	32	15	15	2	77	97
Colgate	22	8	9	5	21	50	54	36	12	16	8	76	87
Brown	22	8	12	2	18	41	54	31	8	21	2	52	84
Union	22	5	15	2	12	46	71	37	8	25	4	67	112
Princeton	22	2	16	4	8	46	71	31	6	20	5	66	100
St. Lawrence	22	2	18	2	6	37	81	36	4	27	5	64	130
Championship: March 21, 2020 † indicates conference regular season champion (Cleary Cup) * indicates conference tournament champion (Whitelaw Cup); Rankings: USCHO.com Top 20 Poll; updated March 23, 2020

== Schedule and results ==
Date	Time	Opponent^{#}	Rank^{#}	Site	TV	Decision	Result	Attendance	Record
Exhibition
October 26		vs. Yale*		Hobey Baker Memorial Rink • Princeton, New Jersey (Exhibition)					
Regular season
November 1	8:37 PM	at #16 St. Cloud State*		Herb Brooks National Hockey Center • St. Cloud, Minnesota	FSN+	Ferland	W 5–3	3,531	1–0–0
November 2	7:07 PM	at #16 St. Cloud State*		Herb Brooks National Hockey Center • St. Cloud, Minnesota		Porter	T 5–5 ^{OT}	4.103	1–0–1
November 8	7:00 PM	at #18 Harvard		Bright-Landry Hockey Center • Boston, Massachusetts		Ferland	L 0–3	1,633	1–1–1 (0–1–0)
November 9	7:02 PM	at Dartmouth		Thompson Arena • Hanover, New Hampshire		Porter	L 1–3	2,837	1–2–1 (0–2–0)
November 15	7:05 PM	vs. Rensselaer		Hobey Baker Memorial Rink • Princeton, New Jersey		Ferland	T 2–2 ^{OT}	1,524	1–2–2 (0–2–1)
November 16	7:02 PM	vs. Union		Hobey Baker Memorial Rink • Princeton, New Jersey		Ferland	L 1–2 ^{OT}	2,034	1–3–2 (0–3–1)
November 22	7:30 PM	at Colgate		Class of 1965 Arena • Hamilton, New York		Ferland	T 2–2 ^{OT}	807	1–3–3 (0–3–2)
November 23	7:02 PM	at #2 Cornell		Lynah Rink • Ithaca, New York		Ferland	L 1–5	4,267	1–4–3 (0–4–2)
Friendship Four
November 29	2:00 PM	vs. Colgate*		SSE Arena Belfast • Belfast, Northern Ireland (Friendship Four Semifinal)	NESN+	Porter	L 1–3	3,823	1–5–3 (0–4–2)
November 30	10:00 AM	vs. New Hampshire*		SSE Arena Belfast • Belfast, Northern Ireland (Friendship Four Consolation)	NESN+	Ferland	L 3–4	4,163	1–6–3 (0–4–2)
December 6	4:02 PM	vs. Colorado College*		Hobey Baker Memorial Rink • Princeton, New Jersey		Ferland	L 2–7	1,001	1–7–3 (0–4–2)
December 7	7:00 PM	vs. Colorado College*		Hobey Baker Memorial Rink • Princeton, New Jersey		Forget	L 1–2 ^{OT}	1,685	1–8–3 (0–4–2)
December 10	7:00 PM	vs. American International*		Hobey Baker Memorial Rink • Princeton, New Jersey		Forget	W 2–1	888	2–8–3 (0–4–2)
December 28	7:03 PM	vs. Quinnipiac		Hobey Baker Memorial Rink • Princeton, New Jersey		Forget	L 1–3	2,195	2–9–3 (0–5–2)
December 29	7:05 PM	at Quinnipiac		People's United Center • Hamden, Connecticut		Ferland	L 3–4	2,885	2–10–3 (0–6–2)
January 3	7:00 PM	vs. Dartmouth		Hobey Baker Memorial Rink • Princeton, New Jersey		Forget	L 3–4 ^{OT}	1,807	2–11–3 (0–7–2)
January 4	7:00 PM	vs. #16 Harvard		Hobey Baker Memorial Rink • Princeton, New Jersey		Forget	T 3–3 ^{OT}	2,442	2–11–4 (0–7–3)
January 10	7:00 PM	at #7 Clarkson		Cheel Arena • Potsdam, New York		Forget	L 1–2	2,110	2–12–4 (0–8–3)
January 11	7:00 PM	at St. Lawrence		Roos House • Canton, New York		Forget	W 1–0 ^{OT}	393	3–12–4 (1–8–3)
January 31	7:00 PM	vs. Colgate		Hobey Baker Memorial Rink • Princeton, New Jersey		Forget	L 0–3	1,888	3–13–4 (1–9–3)
February 1	7:02 PM	vs. #1 Cornell		Hobey Baker Memorial Rink • Princeton, New Jersey		Forget	L 3–5	2,500	3–14–4 (1–10–3)
February 7	7:00 PM	at Brown		Meehan Auditorium • Providence, Rhode Island		Porter	L 3–4	638	3–15–4 (1–11–3)
February 8	7:00 PM	at Yale		Ingalls Rink • New Haven, Connecticut		Ferland	L 3–5	2,805	3–16–4 (1–12–3)
February 14	7:00 PM	vs. St. Lawrence		Hobey Baker Memorial Rink • Princeton, New Jersey		Forget	W 6–3	1,282	4–16–4 (2–12–3)
February 15	7:00 PM	at #5 Clarkson		Hobey Baker Memorial Rink • Princeton, New Jersey		Forget	L 1–3	2,082	4–17–4 (2–13–3)
February 21	7:00 PM	at Union		Achilles Rink • Schenectady, New York		Forget	T 2–2	1,981	4–17–5 (2–13–4)
February 22	7:00 PM	at Rensselaer		Houston Field House • Troy, New York		Forget	L 1–7	2,764	4–18–5 (2–14–4)
February 28	7:00 PM	at Yale		Hobey Baker Memorial Rink • Princeton, New Jersey		Forget	L 1–2	1,851	4–19–5 (2–15–4)
February 29	7:02 PM	vs. Brown		Hobey Baker Memorial Rink • Princeton, New Jersey		Forget	L 0–2	1,851	4–20–5 (2–16–4)
ECAC Hockey Tournament
March 6	7:02 PM	at Dartmouth*		Thompson Arena • Hanover, New Hampshire (First Round Game 1)		Forget	W 4–3 ^{OT}	865	5–20–5 (2–16–4)
March 7	7:02 PM	at Dartmouth*		Thompson Arena • Hanover, New Hampshire (First Round Game 2)		Forget	W 5–4 ^{OT}	1,221	6–20–5 (2–16–4)
Princeton Won Series 2–0
Remainder of Tournament Cancelled
*Non-conference game. ^{#}Rankings from USCHO.com Poll. All times are in Eastern Time.

== Scoring statistics ==
Name	Position	Games	Goals	Assists	Points	PIM
Jackson Cressey	F	31	6	16	22	36
Corey Andonovski	RW	26	6	13	19	46
Luke Keenan	C	31	7	11	18	10
Liam Grande	RW	29	8	7	15	4
Derek Topatigh	D	31	5	9	14	22
Spencer Kersten	RW	31	5	7	12	16
Mark Paolini	D	27	4	7	11	14
Jake Paganelli	RW	30	3	8	11	6
Christian O'Neill	C	22	5	5	10	25
Matthew Thom	D	27	3	6	9	14
Jeremy Germain	C/LW	31	2	7	9	4
Finn Evans	RW	31	4	3	7	18
Pito Walton	D	25	1	5	6	6
Liam Gorman	C	21	1	5	6	18
Mike Ufberg	D	25	2	3	5	6
Reid Yochim	D	22	2	2	4	18
Adam Robbins	F	18	0	2	2	2
Nick Seitz	F	25	0	2	2	6
Sami Pharaon	D	14	1	0	1	2
Matt Kellenberger	D	22	0	1	1	14
Jordan Fogarty	F	26	0	1	1	6
Joey Fallon	F	31	0	1	1	8
Matt Hayami	C	3	0	0	0	0
Aidan Porter	G	5	0	0	0	0
Ryan Ferland	G	12	0	0	0	0
Jeremie Forget	G	19	0	0	0	0
Bench	-	31	-	-	-	8
Total			66	120	186	309

== Goaltending statistics ==
Name	Games	Minutes	Wins	Losses	Ties	Goals against	Saves	Shut outs	SV %	GAA
Jeremie Forget	19	1031	5	10	2	48	495	1	.912	2.79
Ryan Ferland	12	599	1	7	2	34	266	0	.887	3.40
Aidan Porter	5	256	0	3	1	17	106	0	.862	3.99
Empty Net	-	24	-	-	-	1	-	-	-	-
Total	31	1910	6	20	5	100	867	1	.897	3.14

== Rankings ==
Poll	Week																							
Poll	Pre	1	2	3	4	5	6	7	8	9	10	11	12	13	14	15	16	17	18	19	20	21	22	23 (Final)
USCHO.com	NR	NR	NR	NR	NR	NR	NR	NR	NR	NR	NR	NR	NR	NR	NR	NR	NR	NR	NR	NR	NR	NR	NR	NR
USA Today	NR	NR	NR	NR	NR	NR	NR	NR	NR	NR	NR	NR	NR	NR	NR	NR	NR	NR	NR	NR	NR	NR	NR	NR
