= 2019–20 St. Lawrence Saints men's ice hockey season =

- Conference: 12th ECAC Hockey
- Home ice: Roos House; Appleton Arena

Rankings
- USCHO.com: NR
- USA Today/ US Hockey Magazine: NR

Record
- Overall: 4–27–5
- Conference: 2–18–2
- Home: 1–12–2
- Road: 3–14–2
- Neutral: 0–1–1

Coaches and captains
- Head coach: Brent Brekke
- Assistant coaches: Ben Murphy; Tommy Hill
- Captain(s): Carson Gicewicz; Dylan Woolf
- Alternate captain(s): Michael Laidley; Ryan Garvey

The 2019-20 St. Lawrence Saints Men's ice hockey season was the 80th season of play for the program and the 59th season in the ECAC Hockey conference. The Saints represented the St. Lawrence University and played their home games at both the Roos House and Appleton Arena and were coached by Brent Brekke, in his 1st season.

== Season ==
Due to renovations to their regular home venue, the Appleton Arena, St. Lawrence began their season using SUNY-Canton's building for scheduled home games. Construction delays further pushed back the Appleton Arena opener until the end of January. By that time, however, their season was a shambles with the team recording only 3 wins in 25 games.

== Roster ==
As of November 26, 2019.

No.	Nat.	Player	Class	Pos	Height	Weight	DoB	Hometown	Previous team	NHL rights
1	(Sweden)	Emil Zetterquist	Sophomore	G	6' 1" (1.85 m)	190 lb (86 kg)	1998-09-21	Stockholm, Sweden	Coulee Region Chill (NAHL)	—
2	(United States)	Dylan Woolf (C)	Junior	D	6' 1" (1.85 m)	205 lb (93 kg)	1996-05-03	Victoria, Minnesota	Lincoln Stars (USHL)	—
3	(United States)	Mark Mahoney	Sophomore	D	5' 11" (1.8 m)	185 lb (84 kg)	1999-05-08	Canton, New York	Hotchkiss School (USHS–CT)	—
4	(Canada)	Cameron White	Junior	D	6' 3" (1.91 m)	200 lb (91 kg)	1997-03-12	Toronto, Ontario	Ottawa Jr. Senators (CCHL)	—
7	(Canada)	Andrew McIntyre	Sophomore	F	5' 10" (1.78 m)	180 lb (82 kg)	1999-10-28	Kitchener, Ontario	Oakville Blades (USHL)	—
8	(United States)	Eddie Pavlini	Junior	F	6' 0" (1.83 m)	180 lb (82 kg)	1996-06-10	Far Hills, New Jersey	East Coast Wizards (EHL)	—
9	(Canada)	Ryan Garvey (A)	Senior	F	6' 0" (1.83 m)	185 lb (84 kg)	1996-06-27	Oakville, Ontario	Oakville Blades (OJHL)	—
10	(Canada)	David Jankowski	Sophomore	F	6' 1" (1.85 m)	175 lb (79 kg)	1997-05-25	Waterdown, Ontario	Hawkesbury Hawks (CCHL)	—
11	(United States)	Carson Gicewicz (C)	Senior	F	6' 3" (1.91 m)	213 lb (97 kg)	1997-03-04	Orchard Park, New York	Sioux Falls Stampede (USHL)	—
12	(United States)	Bo Hanson	Junior	D	6' 2" (1.88 m)	205 lb (93 kg)	1997-11-13	Boise, Idaho	Muskegon Lumberjacks (USHL)	—
13	(Finland)	Aleksi Peltonen	Freshman	F	5' 10" (1.78 m)	180 lb (82 kg)	1998-06-08	Helsinki, Finland	Omaha Lancers (USHL)	—
14	(United States)	Cade Gleekel	Junior	F	6' 1" (1.85 m)	200 lb (91 kg)	1997-09-27	Golden Valley, Minnesota	Merritt Centennials (BCHL)	—
15	(United States)	Jacob Nielsen	Junior	F	6' 0" (1.83 m)	180 lb (82 kg)	1998-02-21	New Berlin, Wisconsin	Lincoln Stars (USHL)	—
16	(United States)	Nicholas Wildgoose	Freshman	F	5' 10" (1.78 m)	185 lb (84 kg)	1999-12-07	Cary, North Carolina	Rockland Nationals (CCHL)	—
17	(Canada)	Alex Gilmour	Senior	F	6' 5" (1.96 m)	210 lb (95 kg)	1996-01-29	Uxbridge, Ontario	Pembroke Lumber Kings (CCHL)	—
18	(United States)	Kaden Pickering	Sophomore	F	5' 9" (1.75 m)	180 lb (82 kg)	1998-12-17	Madrid, New York	Chilliwack Chiefs (BCHL)	—
19	(Canada)	Ted McGeen	Sophomore	F	6' 0" (1.83 m)	180 lb (82 kg)	1997-12-18	Windsor, Ontario	Wellington Dukes (OJHL)	—
20	(United States)	Zach Risteau	Sophomore	F	5' 8" (1.73 m)	170 lb (77 kg)	1998-02-23	Lakeville, Minnesota	Merritt Centennials (BCHL)	—
21	(United States)	Carson Dimoff	Sophomore	F	5' 11" (1.8 m)	185 lb (84 kg)	1999-05-11	Scottsdale, Arizona	Sioux Falls Stampede (USHL)	—
22	(Canada)	Jeff Clarke	Sophomore	D	6' 4" (1.93 m)	215 lb (98 kg)	1999-04-15	London, Ontario	Oakville Blades (OJHL)	—
23	(United States)	Ashton Fry	Freshman	F	5' 11" (1.8 m)	185 lb (84 kg)	1998-07-16	Highlands Ranch, Colorado	Kemptville 73's (CCHL)	—
24	(United States)	Cameron Buhl	Freshman	F	5' 10" (1.78 m)	184 lb (83 kg)	1998-12-03	South St. Paul, Minnesota	Minnesota Magicians (NAHL)	—
25	(Canada)	Michael Laidley (A)	Graduate	F	5' 11" (1.8 m)	193 lb (88 kg)	1995-03-28	Little Current, Ontario	Aurora Tigers (OJHL)	—
27	(Canada)	Keenan Suthers	Junior	F	6' 8" (2.03 m)	235 lb (107 kg)	1998-04-27	Tecumseh, Ontario	Dubuque Fighting Saints (USHL)	—
28	(Canada)	Callum Cusinato	Junior	F	6' 2" (1.88 m)	205 lb (93 kg)	1998-09-29	Toronto, Ontario	Toronto Jr. Canadiens (OJHL)	—
29	(United States)	Jordan Steinmetz	Freshman	F	5' 8" (1.73 m)	160 lb (73 kg)	1999-01-10	Chippewa Falls, Wisconsin	Sioux City Musketeers (USHL)	—
30	(Canada)	Daniel Mannella	Senior	G	6' 1" (1.85 m)	180 lb (82 kg)	1995-08-24	Woodbridge, Ontario	Whitby Fury (OJHL)	—
32	(Sweden)	Philip Alftberg	Junior	D	5' 8" (1.73 m)	180 lb (82 kg)	1997-01-19	Märsta, Sweden	Fargo Force (USHL)	—
33	(United States)	Tim Makowski	Freshman	D	6' 1" (1.85 m)	195 lb (88 kg)	1998-11-14	St. Louis, Missouri	Aberdeen Wings (NAHL)	—
35	(Canada)	Francis Boisvert	Freshman	G	6' 2" (1.88 m)	170 lb (77 kg)	1999-03-11	Blainville, Quebec	Ottawa Jr. Senators (CCHL)	—
44	(United States)	Jake Stevens	Junior	D	6' 2" (1.88 m)	205 lb (93 kg)	1996-12-06	Naperville, Illinois	Victoria Grizzlies (BCHL)	—

== Standings ==
2019–20 ECAC Hockey Standings
	Conference record							Overall record					
	GP	W	L	T	PTS	GF	GA	GP	W	L	T	GF	GA
#1 Cornell †	22	18	2	2	38	81	34	29	23	2	4	104	45
#7 Clarkson	22	16	5	1	33	63	38	34	23	8	3	96	63
#14 Quinnipiac	22	14	6	2	30	64	45	34	21	11	2	94	78
Rensselaer	22	13	8	1	27	63	41	34	17	15	2	95	87
Harvard	22	11	6	5	27	82	59	31	15	10	6	116	87
Dartmouth	22	10	10	2	22	60	73	31	13	14	4	93	106
Yale	22	10	10	2	22	57	64	32	15	15	2	77	97
Colgate	22	8	9	5	21	50	54	36	12	16	8	76	87
Brown	22	8	12	2	18	41	54	31	8	21	2	52	84
Union	22	5	15	2	12	46	71	37	8	25	4	67	112
Princeton	22	2	16	4	8	46	71	31	6	20	5	66	100
St. Lawrence	22	2	18	2	6	37	81	36	4	27	5	64	130
Championship: March 21, 2020 † indicates conference regular season champion (Cleary Cup) * indicates conference tournament champion (Whitelaw Cup); Rankings: USCHO.com Top 20 Poll; updated March 23, 2020

== Schedule and results ==
Date	Time	Opponent^{#}	Rank^{#}	Site	TV	Decision	Result	Attendance	Record
Regular season
October 11	7:05 PM	at Mercyhurst*		Mercyhurst Ice Center • Erie, Pennsylvania		Zetterquist	L 2–3 ^{OT}	578	0–1–0
October 12	7:05 PM	at Mercyhurst*		Mercyhurst Ice Center • Erie, Pennsylvania		Mannella	W 3–2	830	1–1–0
October 18	7:00 PM	vs. #13 Providence*		Roos House • Canton, New York		Mannella	L 0–6	733	1–2–0
October 19	7:00 PM	vs. Vermont*		Roos House • Canton, New York		Boisvert	L 0–2	572	1–3–0
October 25	7:05 PM	at Holy Cross*		Hart Center • Worcester, Massachusetts		Mannella	T 2–2	1,837	1–3–1
October 26	7:05 PM	vs. Bentley*		Bentley Arena • Waltham, Massachusetts		Mannella	W 3–0	1,094	2–3–1
November 1	7:00 PM	at #11 Clarkson*		Cheel Arena • Potsdam, New York		Zetterquist	L 3–4 ^{OT}	2,956	2–4–1
November 2	7:00 PM	at #11 Clarkson*		Cheel Arena • Potsdam, New York		Boisvert	L 2–3 ^{OT}	3,333	2–5–1
November 8	7:00 PM	at Rensselaer		Houston Field House • Troy, New York		Boisvert	L 2–6	1,831	2–6–1 (0–1–0)
November 9	7:00 PM	at Union		Achilles Rink • Schenectady, New York		Zetterquist	W 3–2 ^{OT}	1,865	3–6–1 (1–1–0)
November 15	7:00 PM	vs. Colgate		Roos House • Canton, New York		Zetterquist	L 1–4	532	3–7–1 (1–2–0)
November 16	7:00 PM	vs. #3 Cornell		Roos House • Canton, New York		Boisvert	L 1–6	592	3–8–1 (1–3–0)
November 22	7:30 PM	at Yale		Ingalls Rink • New Haven, Connecticut		Mannella	L 3–6	1,910	3–9–1 (1–4–0)
November 23	7:00 PM	at Brown		Meehan Auditorium • Providence, Rhode Island		Mannella	L 2–3	557	3–10–1 (1–5–0)
November 29	7:30 PM	vs. Maine*		Roos House • Canton, New York		Zetterquist	L 2–5	515	3–11–1 (1–5–0)
November 30	7:00 PM	vs. Maine*		Roos House • Canton, New York		Boisvert	T 1–1 ^{OT}	363	3–11–2 (1–5–0)
December 7	7:00 PM	at #5 Clarkson		Cheel Arena • Potsdam, New York		Mannella	L 1–3	3,158	3–12–2 (1–6–0)
Ledyard Bank Classic
December 28	4:02 PM	vs. Connecticut*		Thompson Arena • Hanover, New Hampshire (Ledyard Bank Classic)	NESN	Zetterquist	T 2–2 ^{SOL}	3,003	3–12–3 (1–6–0)
December 29	4:02 PM	vs. Colorado College*		Thompson Arena • Hanover, New Hampshire (Ledyard Bank Classic)		Boisvert	L 3–7	2,312	3–13–3 (1–6–0)
January 3	7:00 PM	vs. Union		Roos House • Canton, New York		Mannella	L 4–5 ^{OT}	421	3–14–3 (1–7–0)
January 4	7:00 PM	vs. Rensselaer		Roos House • Canton, New York		Boisvert	L 0–3	502	3–15–3 (1–8–0)
January 10	7:05 PM	vs. Quinnipiac		Roos House • Canton, New York		Mannella	L 2–3	353	3–16–3 (1–9–0)
January 11	7:00 PM	vs. Princeton		Roos House • Canton, New York		Mannella	L 0–1 ^{OT}	393	3–17–3 (1–10–0)
January 17	7:00 PM	at #16 Harvard		Bright-Landry Hockey Center • Boston, Massachusetts		Mannella	L 1–3	1,892	3–18–3 (1–11–0)
January 18	7:00 PM	at Dartmouth		Thompson Arena • Hanover, New Hampshire		Boisvert	L 0–2	2,369	3–19–3 (1–12–0)
January 31	7:00 PM	at Brown		Appleton Arena • Canton, New York		Boisvert	L 0–2	1,764	3–20–3 (1–13–0)
February 1	7:00 PM	vs. Yale		Appleton Arena • Canton, New York		Mannella	T 2–2 ^{OT}	1,392	3–20–4 (1–13–1)
February 8	7:00 PM	vs. #5 Clarkson		Appleton Arena • Canton, New York		Boisvert	L 0–2	2,321	3–21–4 (1–14–1)
February 14	7:00 PM	at Princeton		Hobey Baker Memorial Rink • Princeton, New Jersey		Boisvert	L 3–6	1,282	3–22–4 (1–15–1)
February 15	7:00 PM	at #15 Quinnipiac		People's United Center • Hamden, Connecticut		Mannella	L 1–6	2,978	3–23–4 (1–16–1)
February 21	7:00 PM	vs. Dartmouth		Appleton Arena • Canton, New York		Boisvert	L 2–5	1,121	3–24–4 (1–17–1)
February 22	7:00 PM	vs. #20 Harvard		Appleton Arena • Canton, New York		Mannella	W 6–3	1,185	4–24–4 (2–17–1)
February 28	7:00 PM	at #1 Cornell		Lynah Rink • Ithaca, New York		Mannella	L 0–5	3,889	4–25–4 (2–18–1)
February 29	7:00 PM	vs. Colgate		Class of 1965 Arena • Hamilton, New York		Boisvert	T 2–2 ^{OT}	1,113	4–25–5 (2–18–2)
ECAC Hockey Tournament
March 6	7:00 PM	at Harvard*		Bright-Landry Hockey Center • Boston, Massachusetts (First Round Game 1)		Boisvert	L 3–5	438	4–26–5 (2–18–2)
March 7	7:00 PM	at Harvard*		Bright-Landry Hockey Center • Boston, Massachusetts (First Round Game 2)		Mannella	L 1–7	514	4–27–5 (2–18–2)
St. Lawrence Lost Series 0–2
*Non-conference game. ^{#}Rankings from USCHO.com Poll. All times are in Eastern Time.

== Scoring Statistics ==
Name	Position	Games	Goals	Assists	Points	PIM
Zach Risteau	C/LW	34	7	16	23	10
Bo Hanson	D	33	5	14	19	26
Keenan Suthers	LW	31	9	5	14	14
Jordan Steinmetz	F	35	5	8	13	8
Aleksi Peltonen	F	36	4	9	13	2
David Jankowski	C	25	4	7	11	6
Ryan Garvey	LW	33	6	4	10	14
Jake Stevens	D	33	2	8	10	22
Alex Gilmour	LW	35	2	7	9	16
Kaden Pickering	RW	28	5	3	8	29
Andrew McIntyre	RW	26	4	4	8	14
Ashton Fry	F	26	3	5	8	12
Dylan Woolf	D	36	0	7	7	51
Cameron Buhl	F	29	1	4	5	12
Tim Makowski	D	34	1	4	5	22
Jacob Nielsen	F	23	2	2	4	4
Philip Alftberg	D/RW	18	0	4	4	12
Callum Cusinato	C/LW	23	2	1	3	12
Michael Laidley	LW	28	0	3	3	16
Ted McGeen	LW	10	2	0	2	2
Daniel Mannella	G	18	0	1	1	2
Carson Dimoff	G	22	0	1	1	6
Jeff Clarke	D	35	0	1	1	41
Eddie Pavlini	F	1	0	0	0	0
Carson Gicewicz	C	2	0	0	0	2
Cade Gleekel	C	2	0	0	0	0
Nicholas Wildgoose	RW	4	0	0	0	0
Emil Zetterquist	G	7	0	0	0	10
Mark Mahoney	D	14	0	0	0	0
Francis Boisvert	G	15	0	0	0	0
Cameron White	D	26	0	0	0	6
Bench	36	-	-	-	-	6
Total						

== Goaltending statistics ==
Name	Games	Minutes	Wins	Losses	Ties	Goals against	Saves	Shut outs	SV %	GAA
Emil Zetterquist	7	324	1	4	1	15	154	0	.911	2.77
Daniel Mannella	18	1018	3	11	2	56	496	1	.899	3.30
Francis Boisvert	15	823	0	12	2	48	417	0	.897	3.50
Empty Net	-	31	-	-	-	11	-	-	-	-
Total	36	2198	4	27	5	130	1067	1	.891	3.55

== Rankings ==
Poll	Week																							
Poll	Pre	1	2	3	4	5	6	7	8	9	10	11	12	13	14	15	16	17	18	19	20	21	22	23 (Final)
USCHO.com	NR	NR	NR	NR	NR	NR	NR	NR	NR	NR	NR	NR	NR	NR	NR	NR	NR	NR	NR	NR	NR	NR	NR	NR
USA Today	NR	NR	NR	NR	NR	NR	NR	NR	NR	NR	NR	NR	NR	NR	NR	NR	NR	NR	NR	NR	NR	NR	NR	NR
