= 2019–20 Quinnipiac Bobcats men's ice hockey season =

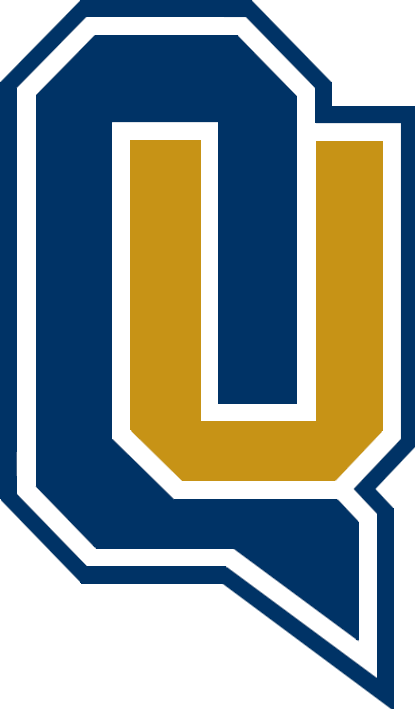
- Conference: 3rd ECAC Hockey
- Home ice: People's United Center

Rankings
- USCHO.com: 14
- USA Today/ US Hockey Magazine: 14

Record
- Overall: 21–11–2
- Conference: 14–6–2
- Home: 13–3–0
- Road: 7–8–2
- Neutral: 1–0–0

Coaches and captains
- Head coach: Rand Pecknold
- Assistant coaches: Bill Riga; Joe Dumais; Justin Eddy
- Captain: Nick Jermain
- Alternate captain(s): Alex Whelan; Odeen Tufto

The 2019-20 Quinnipiac Bobcats Men's ice hockey season was the 44th season of play for the program and the 15th season in the ECAC Hockey conference. The Bobcats represented the Quinnipiac University and played their home games at the Frank Perrotti, Jr. Arena in the People's United Center, and were coached by Rand Pecknold, in his 26th season.

On March 12, ECAC Hockey announced that the remainder of the tournament was cancelled due to the COVID-19 pandemic.

== Roster ==
As of July 17, 2019.

No.	Nat.	Player	Class	Pos	Height	Weight	DoB	Hometown	Previous team	NHL rights
2	(Latvia)	Kārlis Čukste	Senior	D	6' 3" (1.91 m)	220 lb (100 kg)	1997-06-17	Riga, Latvia	Chicago Steel (USHL)	SJS, 130th overall 2015
3	(Canada)	Peter DiLiberatore	Sophomore	D	6' 0" (1.83 m)	170 lb (77 kg)	2000-03-31	Bedford, Nova Scotia	Salisbury School (USHS–CT)	VGK, 180th overall 2018
4	(United States)	Michael Lombardi	Sophomore	D	6' 0" (1.83 m)	187 lb (85 kg)	1998-08-20	Barrington, Rhode Island	West Kelowna Warriors (BCHL)	—
5	(United States)	C. J. McGee	Freshman	D	6' 0" (1.83 m)	180 lb (82 kg)	1999-03-12	Pearl River, New York	Shreveport Mudbugs (NAHL)	—
6	(United States)	P. J. Fletcher	Freshman	F	6' 2" (1.88 m)	186 lb (84 kg)	2001-07-12	Dana Point, California	Wenatchee Wild (BCHL)	—
7	(United States)	Marcus Chorney	Sophomore	D	6' 1" (1.85 m)	190 lb (86 kg)	1997-09-16	Hastings, Minnesota	Amarillo Bulls (NAHL)	—
8	(United States)	Alex Whelan (A)	Senior	F	6' 0" (1.83 m)	212 lb (96 kg)	1997-07-20	Ramsey, New Jersey	Jersey Hitmen (USPHL)	—
10	(Canada)	Ethan de Jong	Sophomore	F	5' 10" (1.78 m)	175 lb (79 kg)	1999-07-12	North Vancouver, British Columbia	Prince George Spruce Kings (BCHL)	—
11	(United States)	Wyatt Bongiovanni	Sophomore	F	6' 0" (1.83 m)	195 lb (88 kg)	1999-07-24	Birmingham, Michigan	Muskegon Lumberjacks (USHL)	—
12	(United States)	Daniel Winslow	Sophomore	F	5' 11" (1.8 m)	195 lb (88 kg)	1997-09-26	Fairfield, Connecticut	Jersey Hitmen (NCDC)	—
13	(Canada)	Jeremy Smith	Freshman	D	5' 9" (1.75 m)	188 lb (85 kg)	1998-07-16	Toronto, Ontario	Surrey Eagles (BCHL)	—
14	(Canada)	Ethan Leyh	Freshman	F	6' 0" (1.83 m)	187 lb (85 kg)	2001-06-07	Anmore, British Columbia	Langley Rivermen (BCHL)	—
15	(Canada)	Jayden Lee	Freshman	D	5' 9" (1.75 m)	155 lb (70 kg)	2001-01-10	North Vancouver, British Columbia	Powell River Kings (BCHL)	—
16	(Sweden)	William Fällström	Sophomore	F	5' 11" (1.8 m)	180 lb (82 kg)	1998-02-03	Stockholm, Sweden	Fargo Force (USHL)	—
17	(United States)	Cam Boudreau	Sophomore	D	6' 1" (1.85 m)	185 lb (84 kg)	1999-11-27	Salem, New Hampshire	Boston Junior Bruins (NCDC)	—
18	(United States)	Nick Jermain (C)	Senior	F	6' 0" (1.83 m)	174 lb (79 kg)	1996-06-07	Norwalk, Connecticut	Merritt Centennials (BCHL)	—
19	(United States)	T. J. Friedmann	Sophomore	F	6' 2" (1.88 m)	180 lb (82 kg)	1998-02-27	St. Louis, Missouri	Victoria Grizzlies (BCHL)	—
20	(United States)	Matt Fawcett	Freshman	F	5' 6" (1.68 m)	140 lb (64 kg)	1999-04-22	Lincoln, Rhode Island	Powell River Kings (BCHL)	—
22	(United States)	Skyler Brind'Amour	Freshman	F	6' 2" (1.88 m)	185 lb (84 kg)	1999-07-27	Raleigh, North Carolina	Chilliwack Chiefs (BCHL)	EDM, 177th overall 2017
23	(United States)	Zach Metsa	Sophomore	D	5' 9" (1.75 m)	180 lb (82 kg)	1998-10-19	Delafield, Wisconsin	Central Illinois Flying Aces (USHL)	—
24	(United States)	Logan Britt	Freshman	D	6' 2" (1.88 m)	190 lb (86 kg)	1999-02-10	Crystal Lake, Illinois	Sioux Falls Stampede (USHL)	—
26	(Netherlands)	Guus van Nes	Freshman (RS)	F	6' 3" (1.91 m)	190 lb (86 kg)	1997-02-14	Hendrik-Ido-Ambacht, Netherlands	Boston Junior Bruins (NCDC)	—
27	(Canada)	Desi Burgart	Sophomore	F	6' 1" (1.85 m)	185 lb (84 kg)	1998-09-28	North Vancouver, British Columbia	Surrey Eagles (BCHL)	—
28	(United States)	Joe O'Connor	Junior	D	6' 3" (1.91 m)	215 lb (98 kg)	1996-03-16	Hamden, Connecticut	Brooks Bandits (AJHL)	—
29	(United States)	Odeen Tufto (A)	Junior	F	5' 7" (1.7 m)	175 lb (79 kg)	1997-01-09	Chaska, Minnesota	Sioux City Musketeers (USHL)	—
31	(United States)	Keith Petruzzelli	Junior	G	6' 5" (1.96 m)	185 lb (84 kg)	1999-02-09	Wilbraham, Massachusetts	Muskegon Lumberjacks (USHL)	DET, 88th overall 2017
33	(United States)	Josh Mayanja	Junior	G	6' 0" (1.83 m)	165 lb (75 kg)	1997-08-16	Framingham, Massachusetts	South Shore Kings (USPHL)	—
35	(United States)	Evan Fear	Freshman	G	6' 2" (1.88 m)	188 lb (85 kg)	1999-07-05	Winnetka, Illinois	Waterloo Black Hawks (USHL)	—

== Standings ==
2019–20 ECAC Hockey Standings
	Conference record							Overall record					
	GP	W	L	T	PTS	GF	GA	GP	W	L	T	GF	GA
#1 Cornell †	22	18	2	2	38	81	34	29	23	2	4	104	45
#7 Clarkson	22	16	5	1	33	63	38	34	23	8	3	96	63
#14 Quinnipiac	22	14	6	2	30	64	45	34	21	11	2	94	78
Rensselaer	22	13	8	1	27	63	41	34	17	15	2	95	87
Harvard	22	11	6	5	27	82	59	31	15	10	6	116	87
Dartmouth	22	10	10	2	22	60	73	31	13	14	4	93	106
Yale	22	10	10	2	22	57	64	32	15	15	2	77	97
Colgate	22	8	9	5	21	50	54	36	12	16	8	76	87
Brown	22	8	12	2	18	41	54	31	8	21	2	52	84
Union	22	5	15	2	12	46	71	37	8	25	4	67	112
Princeton	22	2	16	4	8	46	71	31	6	20	5	66	100
St. Lawrence	22	2	18	2	6	37	81	36	4	27	5	64	130
Championship: March 21, 2020 † indicates conference regular season champion (Cleary Cup) * indicates conference tournament champion (Whitelaw Cup); Rankings: USCHO.com Top 20 Poll; updated March 23, 2020

== Schedule and results ==
Date	Time	Opponent^{#}	Rank^{#}	Site	TV	Decision	Result	Attendance	Record
Exhibition
October 5	4:05 PM	vs. Brock*	#8	People's United Center • Hamden, Connecticut (Exhibition)		Fear	T 4–4 ^{OT}	1,234	
Regular season
October 11	7:17 PM	vs. American International*	#9	People's United Center • Hamden, Connecticut		Petruzzelli	W 3–2 ^{OT}	2,823	1–0–0
October 12	7:00 PM	at American International*	#9	MassMutual Center • Springfield, Massachusetts		Petruzzelli	W 3–2	1,376	2–0–0
October 18	7:00 PM	vs. Maine*	#8	People's United Center • Hamden, Connecticut		Petruzzelli	L 2–4	3,108	2–1–0
October 19	7:05 PM	vs. Maine*	#8	People's United Center • Hamden, Connecticut		Petruzzelli	W 4–3	3,119	3–1–0
October 27	2:05 PM	vs. Vermont*	#9	People's United Center • Hamden, Connecticut		Petruzzelli	W 4–0	2,725	4–1–0
November 1	9:05 PM	at Arizona State*	#9	Oceanside Ice Arena • Tempe, Arizona		Fear	L 3–5	901	4–2–0
November 2	9:05 PM	at Arizona State*	#9	Oceanside Ice Arena • Tempe, Arizona		Petruzzelli	L 1–4	915	4–3–0
November 8	7:02 PM	at Dartmouth	#15	Thompson Arena • Hanover, New Hampshire		Petruzzelli	T 2–2	1,589	4–3–1 (0–0–1)
November 9	7:00 PM	at #18 Harvard	#15	Bright-Landry Hockey Center • Boston, Massachusetts	NESN+	Petruzzelli	L 2–7	1,887	4–4–1 (0–1–1)
November 15	7:05 PM	vs. Union		People's United Center • Hamden, Connecticut		Petruzzelli	W 2–1	2,934	5–4–1 (1–1–1)
November 16	7:05 PM	vs. Rensselaer		People's United Center • Hamden, Connecticut		Petruzzelli	W 3–1	3,090	6–4–1 (2–1–1)
November 22	7:02 PM	at #2 Cornell		Lynah Rink • Ithaca, New York		Petruzzelli	L 1–2	3,876	6–5–1 (2–2–1)
November 23	7:30 PM	at Colgate		Class of 1965 Arena • Hamilton, New York		Petruzzelli	L 1–3	769	6–6–1 (2–3–1)
November 29	7:35 PM	vs. Massachusetts*		People's United Center • Hamden, Connecticut		Petruzzelli	L 0–3	2,992	6–7–1 (2–3–1)
November 30	7:00 PM	at Massachusetts*		Mullins Center • Amherst, Massachusetts	NESN	Petruzzelli	W 2–1	2,857	7–7–1 (2–3–1)
December 28	7:03 PM	at Princeton		Hobey Baker Memorial Rink • Princeton, New Jersey		Petruzzelli	W 3–1	2,195	8–7–1 (3–3–1)
December 29	7:05 PM	vs. Princeton		People's United Center • Hamden, Connecticut		Petruzzelli	W 4–3	2,885	9–7–1 (4–3–1)
January 3	7:00 PM	vs. #16 Harvard		People's United Center • Hamden, Connecticut		Petruzzelli	W 6–1	2,840	10–7–1 (5–3–1)
January 4	7:05 PM	vs. Dartmouth		People's United Center • Hamden, Connecticut		Petruzzelli	W 5–1	2,757	11–7–1 (6–3–1)
January 10	7:05 PM	vs. St. Lawrence		Roos House • Canton, New York		Petruzzelli	W 3–2	353	12–7–1 (7–3–1)
January 11	7:00 PM	at #7 Clarkson		Cheel Arena • Potsdam, New York		Petruzzelli	L 2–5	2,342	12–8–1 (7–4–1)
January 17	7:00 PM	at Holy Cross*	#20	Hart Center • Worcester, Massachusetts		Petruzzelli	W 4–3	869	13–8–1 (7–4–1)
Connecticut Ice
January 25	4:00 PM	vs. Connecticut*	#17	Webster Bank Arena • Bridgeport, Connecticut (Connecticut Ice Semifinal)	SNY	Petruzzelli	W 3–2	5,724	14–8–1 (7–4–1)
January 26	7:00 PM	Sacred Heart*	#17	Webster Bank Arena • Bridgeport, Connecticut (Connecticut Ice Championship)	SNY	Petruzzelli	L 1–4	5,724	14–9–1 (7–4–1)
January 31	7:00 PM	vs. #1 Cornell	#18	People's United Center • Hamden, Connecticut		Petruzzelli	W 5–0	3,488	15–9–1 (8–4–1)
February 1	7:00 PM	vs. Colgate	#18	People's United Center • Hamden, Connecticut		Petruzzelli	W 2–1	2,893	16–9–1 (9–4–1)
February 7	7:00 PM	at Yale	#16	Ingalls Rink • New Haven, Connecticut		Petruzzelli	W 3–2 ^{OT}	3,268	17–9–1 (10–4–1)
February 8	7:00 PM	at Brown	#16	Meehan Auditorium • Providence, Rhode Island		Petruzzelli	T 2–2 ^{OT}	642	17–9–2 (10–4–2)
February 14	7:00 PM	at #5 Clarkson	#15	People's United Center • Hamden, Connecticut		Petruzzelli	L 2–3	2,890	17–10–2 (10–5–2)
February 15	7:00 PM	at St. Lawrence	#15	People's United Center • Hamden, Connecticut		Petruzzelli	W 6–1	2,978	18–10–2 (11–5–2)
February 21	7:00 PM	at Rensselaer	#16	Houston Field House • Troy, New York		Petruzzelli	L 0–4	3,008	18–11–2 (11–6–2)
February 22	7:00 PM	at Union	#16	Achilles Rink • Schenectady, New York		Petruzzelli	W 3–2 ^{OT}	1,790	19–11–2 (12–6–2)
February 28	7:00 PM	at Brown	#17	People's United Center • Hamden, Connecticut		Petruzzelli	W 2–1	3,243	20–11–2 (13–6–2)
February 29	7:00 PM	vs. Yale	#17	People's United Center • Hamden, Connecticut (Heroes Hat)		Petruzzelli	W 5–0	3,625	21–11–2 (14–6–2)
ECAC Hockey Tournament
Remainder of Tournament Cancelled
*Non-conference game. ^{#}Rankings from USCHO.com Poll. All times are in Eastern Time.

== Scoring Statistics ==
Name	Position	Games	Goals	Assists	Points	PIM
Odeen Tufto	C	34	7	31	38	10
Wyatt Bongiovanni	C	34	15	10	25	36
Alex Whelan	RW	29	13	11	24	10
Nick Jermain	F	34	12	9	21	10
Peter DiLiberatore	D	34	6	15	21	39
Ethan de Jong	RW	34	7	11	18	14
Kārlis Čukste	D	34	4	14	18	14
Zach Metsa	D	34	5	12	17	2
William Fällström	C/LW	33	1	16	17	29
Skyler Brind'Amour	C	34	4	9	13	16
Ethan Leyh	F	34	7	3	10	8
P. J. Fletcher	F	34	0	6	6	2
Michael Lombardi	F	28	4	1	5	4
Joe O'Connor	D	27	3	2	5	20
Guus van Nes	LW/RW	27	2	3	5	6
Desi Burgart	F	22	1	3	4	19
Jayden Lee	D	27	1	3	4	0
Logan Britt	D	30	1	1	2	10
T. J. Friedmann	F	32	1	1	2	2
C. J. McGee	D	25	0	2	2	8
Josh Mayanja	G	1	0	0	0	20
Evan Fear	G	4	0	0	0	0
Daniel Winslow	F	5	0	0	0	4
Marcus Chorney	D	12	0	0	0	4
Matthew Fawcett	F	13	0	0	0	2
Keith Petruzzelli	G	34	0	0	0	0
Bench	-	-	-	-	-	4
Total			94	163	257	273

== Goaltending statistics ==
Name	Games	Minutes	Wins	Losses	Ties	Goals against	Saves	Shut outs	SV %	GAA
Josh Mayanja	1	2	0	0	0	0	5	0	1.000	0.00
Keith Petruzzelli	34	1968	21	10	2	66	761	3	.920	2.01
Evan Fear	4	64	0	1	0	7	24	0	.774	6.56
Empty Net	-	20	-	-	-	5	-	-	-	-
Total	34	1054	21	11	2	78	868	3	.910	2.28

== Rankings ==
Poll	Week																							
Poll	Pre	1	2	3	4	5	6	7	8	9	10	11	12	13	14	15	16	17	18	19	20	21	22	23 (Final)
USCHO.com	8	9	8	9	9	15	NR	NR	NR	NR	NR	NR	NR	NR	20	17	18	16	15	16	17	14	14	14
USA Today	11	13	10	13	9	NR	NR	NR	NR	NR	NR	NR	NR	NR	NR	NR	NR	15	15	14	NR	14	14	14

== Players drafted into the NHL ==
=== 2020 NHL entry draft ===
Round	Pick	Player	NHL team
3	74	Ty Smilanic†	Florida Panthers

† incoming freshman
