= 2019–20 Harvard Crimson men's ice hockey season =

College ice hockey season

- Conference: T–4th ECAC Hockey
- Home ice: Bright-Landry Hockey Center

Rankings
- USCHO: NR
- USA Today: NR

Record
- Overall: 15–10–6
- Conference: 11–6–5
- Home: 7–5–2
- Road: 6–3–3
- Neutral: 2–2–1

Coaches and captains
- Head coach: Ted Donato
- Assistant coaches: Jim Tortorella; James Marcou; Brian Robinson
- Captain: Nathan Krusko

The 2019–20 Harvard Crimson Men's ice hockey season was the 120th season of play for the program and the 59th season in the ECAC Hockey conference. The Crimson represented Harvard University and were coached by Ted Donato, in his 16th season as their head coach.

On March 11, Harvard announced that it would not allow its team to travel to Rensselaer and withdrew from the tournament due to coronavirus fears. A day later ECAC Hockey announced that the remainder of the tournament was cancelled due to the COVID-19 pandemic.

== Season ==
The team forfeited their ECAC quarterfinal series to the RPI Engineers and ended their season, due to the Ivy League's decision to suspend its athletics in response to the coronavirus pandemic.

== Departures ==
Player	Position	Nationality	Cause
Adam Baughman	Defenseman	United States	Graduation (Retired)
Viktor Dombrovskiy	Defenseman	Canada	Graduation (Retired)
Mike Floodstrand	Forward	United States	Graduation (signed with Marseille)
Adam Fox	Defenseman	United States	Signed Professional Contract (New York Rangers)
Michael Lackey	Goaltender	United States	Graduate Transfer (Providence)
John Marino	Defenseman	United States	Signed Professional Contract (Pittsburgh Penguins)
Jacob Olson	Defenseman	United States	Graduation (Retired)
Lewis Zerter-Gossage	Forward	Canada	Graduation (signed with Hartford Wolf Pack)

== Recruiting ==
Player	Position	Nationality	Age	Notes
Nick Abruzzese	Forward	United States	20	Slate Hill, NY; Selected 124th overall in 2019 NHL entry draft
John Farinacci	Forward	United States	18	Red Bank, NJ; Selected 76th overall in 2019 NHL entry draft
Jace Foskey	Defenseman	United States	19	Southlake, TX
Mitchell Gibson	Goaltender	United States	20	Phoenixville, PA; Selected 124th overall in 2018 NHL entry draft
Jackson Hartje	Defenseman	United States	23	Detroit, MI; transferred from club team
Henry Thrun	Defenseman	United States	18	Southborough, MA; Selected 101st overall in 2019 NHL entry draft
Austin Wong	Forward	Canada	19	Cochrane, AB; Selected 215th overall in 2018 NHL entry draft

== Roster ==
As of November 26, 2019.

No.	Nat.	Player	Class	Pos	Height	Weight	DoB	Hometown	Previous team	NHL rights
1	(United States)	Sihak Lee	Senior	G	6' 0" (1.83 m)	187 lb (85 kg)	1997-11-28	Cambridge, Massachusetts	Boston Junior Bruins (MHSL U18)	—
2	(United States)	Rilley Walsh	Junior	D	6' 0" (1.83 m)	185 lb (84 kg)	1999-04-21	Andover, New Hampshire	Chicago Steel (USHL)	NJD, 81 overall 2017
3	(United States)	Jack Rathbone	Sophomore	D	5' 11" (1.8 m)	190 lb (86 kg)	1999-05-20	West Roxbury, Massachusetts	Dexter School (USHS)	VAN, 95 overall 2017
5	(United States)	Nick Azar	Junior	D	6' 3" (1.91 m)	201 lb (91 kg)	1998-06-22	Grosse Pointe Park, Michigan	Tri-City Storm (USHL)	—
6	(Canada)	Colton Kerfoot	Senior	F	5' 11" (1.8 m)	174 lb (79 kg)	1996-02-05	West Vancouver, British Columbia	Coquitlam Express (BCHL)	—
7	(United States)	R.J. Murphy	Sophomore	F	6' 2" (1.88 m)	190 lb (86 kg)	1998-10-02	Needham, Massachusetts	West Kelowna Warriors (BCHL)	—
8	(United States)	Ben Foley	Junior	D	6' 1" (1.85 m)	220 lb (100 kg)	1996-11-30	Edina, Minnesota	Cedar Rapids RoughRiders (USHL)	—
9	(United States)	Mitchell Perreault	Junior	F	5' 9" (1.75 m)	165 lb (75 kg)	1996-09-03	Findlay, Ohio	Sioux Falls Stampede (USHL)	—
10	(United States)	Jack Donato	Junior	F	6' 2" (1.88 m)	181 lb (82 kg)	1997-09-18	Scituate, Massachusetts	South Shore Kings (USPHL)	—
11	(United States)	Benjamin Solin	Junior	F	5' 10" (1.78 m)	165 lb (75 kg)	1997-09-17	Madison, Connecticut	Nanaimo Clippers (BCHL)	—
12	(United States)	Jackson Hartje	Junior	D	6' 0" (1.83 m)	176 lb (80 kg)	1996-08-08	Detroit, Michigan	Shreveport Mudbugs (NAHL)	—
13	(United States)	Nathan Krusko (C)	Senior	F	5' 9" (1.75 m)	170 lb (77 kg)	1996-01-29	Alpharetta, Georgia	Omaha Lancers (USHL)	—
14	(United States)	Jace Foskey	Freshman	D	6' 2" (1.88 m)	195 lb (88 kg)	2000-06-01	Southlake, Texas	Madison Capitols (USHL)	—
16	(United States)	Nick Abruzzese	Freshman	F	5' 9" (1.75 m)	160 lb (73 kg)	1999-06-04	Slate Hill, New York	Chicago Steel (USHL)	TOR, 124 overall 2019
17	(United States)	John Farinacci	Freshman	F	6' 0" (1.83 m)	185 lb (84 kg)	2001-02-14	Red Bank, New Jersey	Dexter School (USHS)	ARI, 76 overall 2019
18	(United States)	Jack Drury	Sophomore	F	6' 0" (1.83 m)	180 lb (82 kg)	2000-02-03	Winnetka, Illinois	Waterloo Black Hawks (USHL)	CAR, 42 overall 2018
21	(Canada)	Justin Szeto	Senior	F	5' 9" (1.75 m)	150 lb (68 kg)	1997-02-09	Vancouver, British Columbia	Langley Rivermen (BCHL)	—
22	(United States)	Ryan Siedem	Senior	D	6' 2" (1.88 m)	192 lb (87 kg)	2001-02-25	Madison, New Jersey	Central Illinois Flying Aces (USHL)	—
23	(United States)	Baker Shore	Sophomore	F	5' 11" (1.8 m)	180 lb (82 kg)	1999-08-20	Englewood, Colorado	Chicago Steel (USHL)	—
27	(Canada)	Austin Wong	Freshman	F	5' 11" (1.8 m)	190 lb (86 kg)	2000-08-26	Calgary, Alberta	Okotoks Oilers (AJHL)	WPG, 215 overall 2018
28	(United States)	Henry Bowlby	Junior	F	6' 1" (1.85 m)	181 lb (82 kg)	1997-02-26	Edina, Minnesota	Lincoln Stars (USHL)	—
30	(United States)	Derek Schaedig	Sophomore	G	6' 4" (1.93 m)	190 lb (86 kg)	1998-05-13	Chelsea, Michigan	Lincoln Stars (USHL)	—
32	(United States)	Cameron Gornet	Senior	G	6' 0" (1.83 m)	174 lb (79 kg)	1995-10-07	St. Louis, Missouri	Sioux City Musketeers (USHL)	—
33	(United States)	Jack Badini	Junior	F	6' 0" (1.83 m)	203 lb (92 kg)	1998-01-19	Old Greenwich, Connecticut	Chicago Steel (USHL)	ANA, 91 overall 2017
44	(United States)	Mitchell Gibson	Freshman	G	6' 1" (1.85 m)	187 lb (85 kg)	1999-06-25	Phoenixville, Pennsylvania	Central Illinois Flying Aces (USHL)	WSH, 124 overall 2018
46	(Canada)	Marshall Rifai	Sophomore	D	6' 1" (1.85 m)	190 lb (86 kg)	1998-03-16	Beaconsfield, Quebec	Des Moines Buccaneers (USHL)	—
47	(United States)	Casey Dornbach	Sophomore	F	5' 11" (1.8 m)	180 lb (82 kg)	1997-07-07	Edina, Minnesota	Lincoln Stars (USHL)	—
71	(Canada)	Frédéric Grégoire	Senior	F	5' 11" (1.8 m)	172 lb (78 kg)	1996-11-27	Saint-Lambert, Quebec	St. George's School of Montreal (USHS)	—
77	(United States)	Henry Thrun	Freshman	D	6' 2" (1.88 m)	195 lb (88 kg)	2001-03-12	Southborough, Massachusetts	USNTDP (USHL)	ANA, 101 overall 2019
96	(Canada)	Wyllum Deveaux	Sophomore	F	6' 2" (1.88 m)	205 lb (93 kg)	2000-08-30	Sackville, Nova Scotia	Des Moines Buccaneers (USHL)	—

== Standings ==
2019–20 ECAC Hockey Standings
	Conference record							Overall record					
	GP	W	L	T	PTS	GF	GA	GP	W	L	T	GF	GA
#1 Cornell †	22	18	2	2	38	81	34	29	23	2	4	104	45
#7 Clarkson	22	16	5	1	33	63	38	34	23	8	3	96	63
#14 Quinnipiac	22	14	6	2	30	64	45	34	21	11	2	94	78
Rensselaer	22	13	8	1	27	63	41	34	17	15	2	95	87
Harvard	22	11	6	5	27	82	59	31	15	10	6	116	87
Dartmouth	22	10	10	2	22	60	73	31	13	14	4	93	106
Yale	22	10	10	2	22	57	64	32	15	15	2	77	97
Colgate	22	8	9	5	21	50	54	36	12	16	8	76	87
Brown	22	8	12	2	18	41	54	31	8	21	2	52	84
Union	22	5	15	2	12	46	71	37	8	25	4	67	112
Princeton	22	2	16	4	8	46	71	31	6	20	5	66	100
St. Lawrence	22	2	18	2	6	37	81	36	4	27	5	64	130
Championship: March 21, 2020 † indicates conference regular season champion (Cleary Cup) * indicates conference tournament champion (Whitelaw Cup); Rankings: USCHO.com Top 20 Poll; updated March 23, 2020

== Schedule and results ==
Date	Time	Opponent^{#}	Rank^{#}	Site	TV	Decision	Result	Attendance	Record
Exhibition
October 19		vs. Dartmouth*	#19	Thompson Arena • Hanover, New Hampshire (Exhibition)			W 4–2		
Regular season
November 1	7:30 PM	vs. Dartmouth	#19	Bright-Landry Hockey Center • Boston, Massachusetts		Gornet	W 7–3	1,500	1–0–0 (1–0–0)
November 8	7:00 PM	vs. Princeton	#18	Bright-Landry Hockey Center • Boston, Massachusetts		Gibson	W 3–0	1,633	2–0–0 (2–0–0)
November 9	7:00 PM	vs. #15 Quinnipiac	#18	Bright-Landry Hockey Center • Boston, Massachusetts	NESN+	Gibson	W 7–2	1,887	3–0–0 (3–0–0)
November 15	7:00 PM	at Brown	#13	Meehan Auditorium • Providence, Rhode Island		Gibson	W 4–1	723	4–0–0 (4–0–0)
November 16	7:00 PM	at Yale	#13	Ingalls Rink • New Haven, Connecticut		Gornet	W 6–1	3,077	5–0–0 (5–0–0)
November 22	7:00 PM	at Rensselaer	#10	Houston Field House • Troy, New York		Gornet	W 6–3	2,554	6–0–0 (6–0–0)
November 29	4:30 PM	vs. #14 Boston College*	#9	Bright-Landry Hockey Center • Boston, Massachusetts	NESN	Gornet	L 2–4	3,095	6–1–0 (6–0–0)
December 3	7:00 PM	at Boston University*	#12	Agganis Arena • Boston, Massachusetts		Gornet	L 2–5	2,922	6–2–0 (6–0–0)
December 6	7:00 PM	vs. #2 Cornell	#12	Bright-Landry Hockey Center • Boston, Massachusetts		Gibson	L 1–3	3,095	6–3–0 (6–1–0)
December 7	7:00 PM	vs. Colgate	#12	Bright-Landry Hockey Center • Boston, Massachusetts		Gibson	L 3–4 ^{OT}	1,611	6–4–0 (6–2–0)
December 28	7:00 PM	vs. #16 Arizona State*	#17	FivePoint Arena • Irvine, California		Gibson	W 4–1	2,253	7–4–0 (6–2–0)
December 29	4:00 PM	vs. #16 Arizona State*	#17	FivePoint Arena • Irvine, California		Gibson	T 4–4 ^{OT}	1,744	7–4–1 (6–2–0)
January 3	7:05 PM	at Quinnipiac	#16	People's United Center • Hamden, Connecticut		Gibson	L 1–6	2,840	7–5–1 (6–3–0)
January 4	7:00 PM	at Princeton	#16	Hobey Baker Memorial Rink • Princeton, New Jersey		Gornet	T 3–3 ^{OT}	2,442	7–5–2 (6–3–1)
January 11	7:00 PM	vs. Yale*	#18	Madison Square Garden • New York, New York		Gibson	W 7–0	10,064	8–5–2 (6–3–1)
January 17	7:00 PM	vs. St. Lawrence	#16	Bright-Landry Hockey Center • Boston, Massachusetts		Gibson	W 3–1	1,892	9–5–2 (7–3–1)
January 18	7:00 PM	vs. #7 Clarkson	#16	Bright-Landry Hockey Center • Boston, Massachusetts		Gibson	L 3–5	1,912	9–6–2 (7–4–1)
January 24	7:00 PM	at Colgate	#16	Class of 1965 Arena • Hamilton, New York		Gibson	T 3–3 ^{OT}	1,421	9–6–3 (7–4–2)
January 25	7:00 PM	at #1 Cornell	#16	Lynah Rink • Ithaca, New York		Gornet	T 1–1 ^{OT}	1,421	9–6–4 (7–4–3)
January 31	7:00 PM	at Union	#16	Achilles Rink • Schenectady, New York		Gibson	W 8–5	1,697	10–6–4 (8–4–3)
Beanpot
February 3	5:00 PM	vs. #12 Northeastern	#17	TD Garden • Boston, Massachusetts (Beanpot Semifinal)	NESN	Gibson	L 1–3	13,141	10–7–4 (8–4–3)
February 7	7:00 PM	at Dartmouth	#17	Thompson Arena • Hanover, New Hampshire		Gibson	W 6–2	1,991	11–7–4 (9–4–3)
February 10	4:30 PM	at #7 Boston College	#18	TD Garden • Boston, Massachusetts (Beanpot Third Place)	NESN	Gibson	L 2–7	17,850	11–8–4 (9–4–3)
February 14	7:00 PM	vs. Yale	#18	Bright-Landry Hockey Center • Boston, Massachusetts		Gornet	T 4–4 ^{OT}	2,079	11–8–5 (9–4–4)
February 15	7:00 PM	vs. Brown	#18	Bright-Landry Hockey Center • Boston, Massachusetts		Gibson	T 1–1 ^{OT}	2,064	11–8–6 (9–4–5)
February 21	7:00 PM	at #5 Clarkson	#20	Cheel Arena • Potsdam, New York		Gibson	W 5–2	2,903	12–8–6 (10–4–5)
February 22	7:00 PM	at St. Lawrence	#20	Appleton Arena • Canton, New York		Gibson	L 3–6	1,185	12–9–6 (10–5–5)
February 28	7:00 PM	vs. Rensselaer		Bright-Landry Hockey Center • Boston, Massachusetts		Gibson	L 0–2	1,722	12–10–6 (10–6–5)
February 29	7:00 PM	vs. Union		Bright-Landry Hockey Center • Boston, Massachusetts		Gornet	W 4–1	1,822	13–10–6 (11–6–5)
ECAC Hockey Tournament
March 6	7:00 PM	vs. St. Lawrence*		Bright-Landry Hockey Center • Boston, Massachusetts (First Round Game 1)		Gibson	W 5–3	438	14–10–6 (11–6–5)
March 7	7:02 PM	vs. St. Lawrence*		Bright-Landry Hockey Center • Boston, Massachusetts (First Round Game 2)		Gibson	W 7–1	514	15–10–6 (11–6–5)
Harvard Won Series 2–0
Remainder of Tournament Cancelled
*Non-conference game. ^{#}Rankings from USCHO.com Poll. All times are in Eastern Time.

== Scoring statistics ==
Name	Position	Games	Goals	Assists	Points	PIM
Nick Abruzzese	C	31	14	30	44	4
Jack Drury	C	28	20	19	39	16
Casey Dornbach	RW	31	12	24	36	2
Jack Rathbone	D	28	7	24	31	16
Reilly Walsh	D	30	8	19	27	8
John Farinacci	C	31	10	12	22	21
Henry Thrun	D	31	3	18	21	12
Henry Bowlby	C	31	8	8	16	18
Jack Badini	C	31	6	8	14	10
R. J. Murphy	C	23	6	5	11	2
Colton Kerfoot	F	31	3	5	8	6
Ryan Siedem	D	31	3	5	8	8
Marshall Rifai	D	30	1	7	8	20
Austin Wong	C	21	4	2	6	18
Baker Shore	RW	30	3	3	6	20
Nathan Krusko	C	31	3	3	6	14
Jack Donato	F	31	4	0	4	14
Frédéric Grégoire	F	22	1	2	3	16
Justin Szeto	F	12	0	1	1	2
Wyllum Deveaux	F	14	0	1	1	2
Jace Foskey	D	19	0	1	1	12
Benjamin Solin	F	1	0	0	0	0
Sihak Lee	G	1	0	0	0	0
Benjamin Foley	D	10	0	0	0	2
Nick Azar	D	11	0	0	0	2
Cameron Gornet	G	14	0	0	0	0
Mitchell Gibson	G	23	0	0	0	0
Bench	-	31	-	-	-	6
Total						

== Goaltending statistics ==
Name	Games	Minutes	Wins	Losses	Ties	Goals against	Saves	Shut outs	SV %	GAA
Sihak Lee	1	0:33	0	0	0	0	1	0	1.000	0.00
Mitchell Gibson	23	1288	11	8	3	56	608	1	.916	2.61
Cameron Gornet	14	591	4	2	3	26	277	0	.914	2.64
Empty Net	-	12	-	-	-	5	-	-	-	-
Total	31	1893	15	10	6	87	886	1	.911	2.76

== Rankings ==
Poll	Week																							
Poll	Pre	1	2	3	4	5	6	7	8	9	10	11	12	13	14	15	16	17	18	19	20	21	22	23 (Final)
USCHO.com	19	19	19	19	19	18	13	10	9	12	17	17	16	18	16	16	16	17	18	20	NR	NR	NR	NR
USA Today	NR	NR	NR	NR	NR	15	12	8	6	9	NR	NR	NR	NR	NR	NR	NR	NR	NR	NR	NR	NR	NR	NR

== Players drafted into the NHL ==
=== 2020 NHL entry draft ===
Round	Pick	Player	NHL team
3	67	Ian Moore†	Anaheim Ducks
3	83	Alex Laferriere†	Los Angeles Kings
4	124	Sean Farrell†	Montreal Canadiens
5	151	Mason Langenbrunner†	Boston Bruins
6	156	Kyle Aucoin†	Detroit Red Wings
7	189	John Fusco†	Toronto Maple Leafs
7	213	Ryan Tverberg†	Toronto Maple Leafs

† incoming freshman
