= 2019–20 Union Dutchmen ice hockey season =

- Conference: 10th ECAC Hockey
- Home ice: Achilles Center

Rankings
- USCHO: NR
- USA Today: NR

Record
- Overall: 8–25–4
- Conference: 5–15–2
- Home: 3–10–2
- Road: 5–15–0
- Neutral: 0–0–2

Coaches and captains
- Head coach: Rick Bennett
- Assistant coaches: Jason Tapp; John Ronan; Will Messa
- Captain(s): Vas Kolias; Darion Hanson

The 2019–20 Union Dutchmen ice hockey season was the 80th season of play for the program and the 29th season in the ECAC Hockey conference. The Dutchmen represented Union College and played their home games at Achilles Center, and were coached by Rick Bennett, in his 9th season.

== Departures ==
Player	Position	Nationality	Cause
Luc Brown	Forward	Canada	Transfer (Alaska Anchorage)
Greg Campbell	Defenseman	Canada	Graduation (signed with Florida Everblades)
Mark Dufour	Forward	Canada	Graduation (Retired)
Blake Hayward	Forward	Canada	Transfer (McGill)
Jake Kupsky	Goaltender	United States	Graduation (signed with Pensacola Ice Flyers)
Cole Maier	Forward	United States	Graduation (signed with Manitoba Moose)
Liam Morgan	Forward	Canada	Graduation (signed with Belfast Giants)
Brett Supinski	Forward	United States	Graduation (signed with Ontario Reign)
Brendan Taylor	Forward	Canada	Graduation (Retired)
Sebastian Vidmar	Forward	Sweden	Graduation (signed with Stockton Heat)
Ryan Walker	Forward	United States	Graduation (signed with Binghamton Devils)
Joe Young	Goaltender	United States	Graduation (signed with Elmira Enforcers)

== Recruiting ==
Player	Position	Nationality	Age	Notes
Matt Allen	Forward	United States	20	Smithfield, RI
Dylan Anhorn	Defenseman	Canada	20	Calgary, AB
Alex Cohen	Forward	United States	21	Newton, MA
Owen Farris	Forward	Canada	19	Vancouver, BC
Garrett Nieto	Goaltender	United States	21	Yorba Linda, CA
Merek Pipes	Goaltender	Canada	20	Victoria, BC
Ben Pirko	Forward	United States	20	Arlington, VA
Liam Robertson	Forward	Canada	19	Clarington, ON
Christian Sanda	Forward	United States	21	Saint Paul, MN
Colin Schmidt	Forward	United States	19	Maple Grove, MN
Gabriel Seger	Forward	Sweden	19	Uppsala, SWE
Chaz Smedsrud	Forward	United States	21	Luverne, MN

== Roster ==
As of September 12, 2019.

No.	Nat.	Player	Class	Pos	Height	Weight	DoB	Hometown	Previous team	NHL rights
1	(United States)	Garrett Nieto	Freshman	G	6' 4" (1.93 m)	245 lb (111 kg)	1998-05-15	Yorba Linda, California	Janesville Jets (NAHL)	—
2	(United States)	Taylor Brierley	Junior	D	5' 10" (1.78 m)	160 lb (73 kg)	1996-07-31	East Grand Forks, Minnesota	Dubuque Fighting Saints (USHL)	—
3	(United States)	Colin Schmidt	Freshman	F	6' 4" (1.93 m)	225 lb (102 kg)	2000-01-06	Wayzata, Minnesota	Jamestown Rebels (NAHL)	—
4	(United States)	Joseph Campolieto	Junior	D	6' 0" (1.83 m)	185 lb (84 kg)	1998-04-29	Eynon, Pennsylvania	Tri-City Storm (USHL)	—
5	(United States)	Vas Kolias (C)	Senior	D	5' 10" (1.78 m)	165 lb (75 kg)	1997-01-08	Schaumburg, Illinois	Youngstown Phantoms (USHL)	—
7	(United States)	Brandon Estes	Junior	D	6' 0" (1.83 m)	175 lb (79 kg)	1998-02-13	Richardson, Texas	Youngstown Phantoms (USHL)	—
8	(Canada)	Anthony Rinaldi	Senior	F	6' 0" (1.83 m)	188 lb (85 kg)	1995-08-17	Pierrefonds, Quebec	Kingston Voyageurs (OJHL)	—
9	(United States)	Sam Morton	Sophomore	F	5' 11" (1.8 m)	165 lb (75 kg)	1999-07-28	Benicia, California	Wenatchee Wild (BCHL)	—
10	(United States)	Ryan Sidorski	Sophomore	D	6' 2" (1.88 m)	195 lb (88 kg)	1999-10-02	Williamsville, New York	Buffalo Jr. Sabres (OJHL)	—
11	(Canada)	Lucas Breault	Sophomore	F	5' 11" (1.8 m)	160 lb (73 kg)	1999-05-20	Toronto, Ontario	Central Illinois Flying Aces (USHL)	—
12	(United States)	Fletcher Fineman	Sophomore	D	6' 3" (1.91 m)	210 lb (95 kg)	1999-02-17	Lake Worth, Florida	Springfield Jr. Blues (NAHL)	—
13	(Canada)	Zachary Emelifeonwu	Senior	F	6' 2" (1.88 m)	195 lb (88 kg)	1996-09-05	Kingston, Ontario	Kingston Voyageurs (OJHL)	—
14	(United States)	Drew Blackmun	Junior	F	6' 1" (1.85 m)	190 lb (86 kg)	1996-01-18	Minneapolis, Minnesota	Northeastern (HEA)	—
15	(United States)	Jack Adams	Junior	F	6' 6" (1.98 m)	210 lb (95 kg)	1997-02-05	Boxford, Massachusetts	Fargo Force (USHL)	DET, 162nd overall 2017
16	(United States)	Christian Sanda	Freshman	F	6' 0" (1.83 m)	185 lb (84 kg)	1998-03-13	Vadnais Heights, Minnesota	Coquitlam Express (BCHL)	—
17	(United States)	Matt Allen	Freshman	F	6' 2" (1.88 m)	187 lb (85 kg)	1999-03-14	Smithfield, Rhode Island	Boston Junior Bruins (NCDC)	—
18	(Sweden)	Gabriel Seger	Freshman	F	6' 4" (1.93 m)	216 lb (98 kg)	1999-11-15	Uppsala, Sweden	Amarillo Bulls (NAHL)	—
19	(Canada)	Liam Robertson	Freshman	F	6' 5" (1.96 m)	175 lb (79 kg)	2000-05-14	Courtice, Ontario	Youngstown Phantoms (USHL)	—
20	(United States)	Ben Pirko	Freshman	D	6' 2" (1.88 m)	170 lb (77 kg)	1999-02-02	Bethesda, Maryland	New Jersey Titans (NAHL)	—
21	(United States)	Michael Ryan	Sophomore	D	5' 11" (1.8 m)	175 lb (79 kg)	1997-01-19	Marion, Massachusetts	West Kelowna Warriors (BCHL)	—
22	(Canada)	Parker Foo	Junior	F	6' 1" (1.85 m)	195 lb (88 kg)	1998-09-12	Edmonton, Alberta	Brooks Bandits (AJHL)	CHI, 144th overall 2017
23	(United States)	Chaz Smedsrud	Freshman	F	6' 2" (1.88 m)	195 lb (88 kg)	1998-06-04	Luverne, Minnesota	Madison Capitols (USHL)	—
24	(United States)	Alex Cohen	Freshman	F	6' 0" (1.83 m)	180 lb (82 kg)	1998-06-15	Boca Raton, Florida	Northeast Generals (NAHL)	—
25	(United States)	Owen Farris	Freshman	F	6' 3" (1.91 m)	212 lb (96 kg)	2000-06-08	Dallas, Texas	Muskegon Lumberjacks (USHL)	—
27	(Canada)	Josh Kosack	Sophomore	F	6' 0" (1.83 m)	180 lb (82 kg)	1997-06-25	Oakville, Ontario	Green Bay Gamblers (USHL)	—
28	(Canada)	Dylan Anhorn	Freshman	D	6' 0" (1.83 m)	175 lb (79 kg)	1999-01-21	Calgary, Alberta	Prince George Spruce Kings (BCHL)	—
29	(United States)	Sean Harrison	Junior	F	5' 11" (1.8 m)	175 lb (79 kg)	1996-03-29	Anchorage, Alaska	Central Illinois Flying Aces (USHL)	—
33	(Canada)	Merek Pipes	Freshman	G	5' 11" (1.8 m)	170 lb (77 kg)	1998-11-12	Cobble Hill, British Columbia	Swan Valley Stampeders (MJHL)	—
34	(United States)	Darion Hanson (C)	Junior	G	6' 3" (1.91 m)	181 lb (82 kg)	1997-05-19	East Bethel, Minnesota	Vernon Vipers (BCHL)	—

== Standings ==
2019–20 ECAC Hockey Standings
	Conference record							Overall record					
	GP	W	L	T	PTS	GF	GA	GP	W	L	T	GF	GA
#1 Cornell †	22	18	2	2	38	81	34	29	23	2	4	104	45
#7 Clarkson	22	16	5	1	33	63	38	34	23	8	3	96	63
#14 Quinnipiac	22	14	6	2	30	64	45	34	21	11	2	94	78
Rensselaer	22	13	8	1	27	63	41	34	17	15	2	95	87
Harvard	22	11	6	5	27	82	59	31	15	10	6	116	87
Dartmouth	22	10	10	2	22	60	73	31	13	14	4	93	106
Yale	22	10	10	2	22	57	64	32	15	15	2	77	97
Colgate	22	8	9	5	21	50	54	36	12	16	8	76	87
Brown	22	8	12	2	18	41	54	31	8	21	2	52	84
Union	22	5	15	2	12	46	71	37	8	25	4	67	112
Princeton	22	2	16	4	8	46	71	31	6	20	5	66	100
St. Lawrence	22	2	18	2	6	37	81	36	4	27	5	64	130
Championship: March 21, 2020 † indicates conference regular season champion (Cleary Cup) * indicates conference tournament champion (Whitelaw Cup); Rankings: USCHO.com Top 20 Poll; updated March 23, 2020

== Schedule and results ==
Date	Time	Opponent^{#}	Rank^{#}	Site	TV	Decision	Result	Attendance	Record
Regular season
October 5	4:00 PM	vs. Boston University*		Achilles Rink • Schenectady, New York		Hanson	L 3–7	2,088	0–1–0
October 6	4:05 PM	at Army*		Tate Rink • West Point, New York		Hanson	L 2–3	1,541	0–2–0
October 11	7:00 PM	vs. #15 Northeastern*		Achilles Rink • Schenectady, New York		Hanson	L 1–2	1,740	0–3–0
October 12	7:31 PM	vs. #15 Northeastern*		Achilles Rink • Schenectady, New York		Hanson	L 1–2	1,852	0–4–0
October 18	7:00 PM	at #4 Massachusetts*		Mullins Center • Amherst, Massachusetts	NESN	Hanson	L 1–6	4,447	0–5–0
October 19	7:00 PM	at #4 Massachusetts*		Mullins Center • Amherst, Massachusetts		Hanson	L 0–5	5,659	0–6–0
October 25	7:00 PM	vs. Rensselaer		Achilles Rink • Schenectady, New York		Hanson	L 2–3	2,062	0–7–0 (0–1–0)
October 26	7:00 PM	at Rensselaer		Houston Field House • Troy, New York		Hanson	W 2–1	3,108	1–7–0 (1–1–0)
November 1	7:35 PM	at Canisius*		LECOM Harborcenter • Buffalo, New York		Hanson	W 3–0	636	2–7–0 (1–1–0)
November 2	4:05 PM	at Canisius*		LECOM Harborcenter • Buffalo, New York		Hanson	L 0–4	691	2–8–0 (1–1–0)
November 8	7:00 PM	vs. #8 Clarkson		Achilles Rink • Schenectady, New York		Hanson	L 1–5	2,080	2–9–0 (1–2–0)
November 9	7:00 PM	vs. St. Lawrence		Achilles Rink • Schenectady, New York		Hanson	L 2–3 ^{OT}	1,865	2–10–0 (1–3–0)
November 15	7:05 PM	at Quinnipiac		People's United Center • Hamden, Connecticut		Hanson	L 1–2	2,934	2–11–0 (1–4–0)
November 16	7:02 PM	vs. Princeton		Hobey Baker Memorial Rink • Princeton, New Jersey		Hanson	W 2–1 ^{OT}	2,034	3–11–0 (2–4–0)
December 6	7:00 PM	vs. Brown		Achilles Rink • Schenectady, New York		Hanson	W 5–0	1,482	4–11–0 (3–4–0)
December 7	7:00 PM	vs. Yale		Achilles Rink • Schenectady, New York		Hanson	L 0–2	1,614	4–12–0 (3–5–0)
December 13	7:00 PM	vs. Merrimack*		Achilles Rink • Schenectady, New York		Hanson	W 3–2	1,505	5–12–0 (3–5–0)
Catamount Cup
December 28	7:00 PM	at Vermont*		Gutterson Fieldhouse • Burlington, Vermont (Catamount Cup)		Hanson	L 0–2	3,397	5–13–0 (3–5–0)
December 29	4:00 PM	vs. #13 Providence*		Gutterson Fieldhouse • Burlington, Vermont (Catamount Cup)		Hanson	T 1–1 ^{OT}	2,579	5–13–1 (3–5–0)
January 3	7:00 PM	at St. Lawrence		Roos House • Canton, New York		Hanson	W 5–4 ^{OT}	421	6–13–1 (4–5–0)
January 4	7:00 PM	at Clarkson		Cheel Arena • Potsdam, New York		Hanson	L 0–2	2,463	6–14–1 (4–6–0)
January 10	7:05 PM	vs. Colgate		Achilles Rink • Schenectady, New York		Hanson	L 2–3	1,885	6–15–1 (4–7–0)
January 11	7:00 PM	vs. #2 Cornell		Achilles Rink • Schenectady, New York		Hanson	T 3–3 ^{OT}	2,184	6–15–2 (4–7–1)
January 17	7:00 PM	at Yale		Ingalls Rink • New Haven, Connecticut		Hanson	L 0–5	1,944	6–16–2 (4–8–1)
January 18	7:00 PM	at Brown		Meehan Auditorium • Providence, Rhode Island		Hanson	L 2–3	559	6–17–2 (4–9–1)
January 25	7:00 PM	vs. Rensselaer*		Times Union Center • Albany, New York (Mayor's Cup)		Hanson	T 1–1 ^{SOL}	6,164	6–17–3 (4–9–1)
January 31	7:00 PM	vs. #16 Harvard		Achilles Rink • Schenectady, New York		Graziano	L 5–8	1,697	6–18–3 (4–10–1)
February 1	7:00 PM	vs. Dartmouth		Achilles Rink • Schenectady, New York		Graziano	W 4–3	1,791	7–18–3 (5–10–1)
February 14	7:00 PM	at Cornell		Lynah Rink • Ithaca, New York		Hanson	L 2–5	3,601	7–19–3 (5–11–1)
February 15	7:00 PM	at Colgate		Class of 1965 Arena • Hamilton, New York		Hanson	L 0–4	1,164	7–20–3 (5–12–1)
February 21	7:00 PM	vs. Princeton		Achilles Rink • Schenectady, New York		Hanson	T 2–2 ^{OT}	1,981	7–20–4 (5–12–2)
February 22	7:00 PM	vs. Quinnipiac		Achilles Rink • Schenectady, New York		Hanson	L 2–3 ^{OT}	1,790	7–21–4 (5–13–2)
February 28	7:00 PM	at Dartmouth		Thompson Arena • Hanover, New Hampshire		Hanson	L 3–5	1,581	7–22–4 (5–14–2)
February 29	7:00 PM	vs. Harvard		Bright-Landry Hockey Center • Boston, Massachusetts		Hanson	L 1–4	1,822	7–23–4 (5–14–2)
ECAC Hockey Tournament
March 6	7:00 PM	at Yale*		Ingalls Rink • New Haven, Connecticut (First Round Game 1)		Hanson	W 3–0	700	8–23–4 (5–14–2)
March 7	7:00 PM	at Yale*		Ingalls Rink • New Haven, Connecticut (First Round Game 2)		Hanson	L 1–4	850	8–24–4 (5–14–2)
March 8	4:00 PM	at Yale*		Ingalls Rink • New Haven, Connecticut (First Round Game 2)		Hanson	L 1–2 ^{2OT}	700	8–25–4 (5–14–2)
Union Lost Series 1–2
*Non-conference game. ^{#}Rankings from USCHO.com Poll. All times are in Eastern Time.

== Scoring statistics ==
Name	Position	Games	Goals	Assists	Points	PIM
Anthony Rinaldi	RW	37	9	20	29	12
Gabriel Seger	C/LW	37	7	15	22	8
Dylan Anhorn	D	37	6	10	16	22
Sean Harrison	RW	36	6	8	14	6
Vas Kolias	D	33	2	11	13	20
Chaz Smedsrud	LW	33	6	4	10	8
Zachary Emelifeonwu	LW	35	5	4	9	61
Brandon Estes	D	37	3	6	9	26
Christian Sanda	F	32	4	4	8	4
Liam Robertson	C	27	3	5	8	26
Parker Foo	LW	20	3	4	7	10
Matt Allen	C	28	2	5	7	12
Josh Kosack	RW	37	2	5	7	12
Owen Farris	F	33	2	3	5	21
Colin Schmidt	C	32	1	4	5	18
Joseph Campolieto	D	31	0	5	5	39
Sam Morton	F	13	2	1	3	2
Taylor Brierley	D	35	1	2	3	8
Michael Ryan	D	32	1	1	2	12
Lucas Breault	C	12	0	2	2	6
Fletcher Fineman	D	28	1	0	1	6
Ryan Sidorski	D	22	0	1	1	6
Alex Cohen	C	12	0	1	1	2
Merek Pipes	G	1	0	0	0	0
Josh Graziano	G	4	0	0	0	0
Drew Blackmun	F	10	0	0	0	0
Darion Hanson	G	36	0	0	0	2
Bench	-	37	-	-	-	14
Total						

== Goaltending statistics ==
Name	Games	Minutes	Wins	Losses	Ties	Goals against	Saves	Shut outs	SV %	GAA
Darion Hanson	36	2150	7	24	4	100	1007	3	.910	2.79
Josh Graziano	4	95	1	1	0	7	39	0	.848	4.40
Merek Pipes	1	3	0	0	0	1	2	0	.667	15.52
Empty Net	-	26	-	-	-	4	-	-	-	-
Total	37	2276	8	25	4	112	1048	3	.903	2.95

== Rankings ==
Poll	Week																							
Poll	Pre	1	2	3	4	5	6	7	8	9	10	11	12	13	14	15	16	17	18	19	20	21	22	23 (Final)
USCHO.com	NR	NR	NR	NR	NR	NR	NR	NR	NR	NR	NR	NR	NR	NR	NR	NR	NR	NR	NR	NR	NR	NR	NR	NR
USA Today	NR	NR	NR	NR	NR	NR	NR	NR	NR	NR	NR	NR	NR	NR	NR	NR	NR	NR	NR	NR	NR	NR	NR	NR
