= 2019–20 NCAA Division I men's ice hockey rankings =

- NCAA tournament: 2020
- NCAA champion: None due to coronavirus pandemic
- Preseason No. 1 (USA Today): Minnesota–Duluth
- Preseason No. 1 (USCHO): Minnesota–Duluth
- NCAA Division I men's ice hockey rankings

Two human polls made up the 2019–20 NCAA Division I men's ice hockey rankings, the USCHO.com/CBS College Sports poll and the USA Today/USA Hockey Magazine poll. As the 2019–20 season progressed, rankings were updated weekly.

== Legend ==
	Increase in ranking
	Decrease in ranking
	Not ranked previous week
Italics	Number of first place votes
(#-#)	Win–loss–tie record
т	Tied with team above or below also with this symbol

== USCHO ==
	Preseason Sep 30	Week 1 Oct 7	Week 2 Oct 14	Week 3 Oct 21	Week 4 Oct 28	Week 5 Nov 4	Week 6 Nov 11	Week 7 Nov 18	Week 8 Nov 25	Week 9 Dec 2	Week 10 Dec 9	Week 11 Dec 16	Week 12 Dec 30	Week 13 Jan 6	Week 14 Jan 13	Week 15 Jan 20	Week 16 Jan 27	Week 17 Feb 3	Week 18 Feb 10	Week 19 Feb 17	Week 20 Feb 24	Week 21 Mar 2	Week 22 Mar 9	Final Mar 23	
1.	Minnesota–Duluth (49)	Minnesota–Duluth (0–0–0) (39)	Denver (4–0–0) (38)	Denver (6–0–0) (47)	Denver (6–0–0) (46)	Denver (8–0–0) (49)	Minnesota State (8–1–1) (25)	Minnesota State (8–1–1) (36)	Minnesota State (10–1–1) (39)	Minnesota State (12–1–1) (44)	Minnesota State (14–1–1) (43)	North Dakota (14–1–2) (33)	North Dakota (14–1–2) (44)	North Dakota (16–1–2) (46)	North Dakota (17–2–2) (17)	Cornell (13–1–3) (21)	Cornell (14–1–4) (40)	North Dakota (21–3–3) (49)	North Dakota (21–3–3) (48)	North Dakota (23–3–3) (49)	Cornell (21–2–4) (27)	Cornell (23–2–4) (37)	Cornell (23–2–4) (40)	Cornell (23–2–4) (25)	1.
2.	Denver	Denver (2–0–0) (10)	Minnesota State (2–0–0) (8)	Minnesota State (3–0–1) (3)	Minnesota State (5–0–1) (4)	Massachusetts (6–1–0) (1)	Denver (8–1–1) (15)	Cornell (6–0–0) (13)	Cornell (8–0–0) (11)	Cornell (9–0–0) (6)	North Dakota (14–1–2) (6)	Minnesota State (15–2–1) (13)	Cornell (10–1–0) (4)	Cornell (11–1–1) (2)	Cornell (12–1–2) (21)	North Dakota (18–2–3) (13)	North Dakota (19–3–3) (8)	Cornell (15–2–4)	Cornell (17–2–4) (1)	Cornell (19–2–4)	Minnesota State (28–4–2) (14)	North Dakota (25–4–4) (11)	Minnesota State (31–5–2) (5)	North Dakota (26–5–4) (16)	2.
3.	Minnesota State (1)	Minnesota State (0–0–0) (1)	Minnesota–Duluth (1–1–0) (3)	Massachusetts (3–1–0)	Massachusetts (4–1–0)	Minnesota State (6–1–1)	Cornell (4–0–0) (5)	Notre Dame (8–1–1)	North Dakota (10–1–2)	North Dakota (12–1–2)	Cornell (10–1–0) (1)	Cornell (10–1–0) (4)	Minnesota State (16–3–1) (2)	Minnesota State (18–3–1) (2)	Minnesota State (20–3–1) (12)	Minnesota State (22–3–1) (16)	Minnesota State (23–4–1) (2)	Minnesota State (24–4–2) (1)	Minnesota State (26–4–2) (1)	Minnesota State (26–4–2) (1)	North Dakota (23–4–4) (9)	Minnesota State (29–5–2) (1)	North Dakota (26–5–4) (5)	Minnesota State (31–5–2) (6)	3.
4.	Massachusetts	Massachusetts (0–0–0)	Massachusetts (1–0–0)	Cornell (0–0–0)	Cornell (0–0–0)	Cornell (2–0–0)	Notre Dame (7–0–1) (4)	Denver (8–2–2)	Denver (9–3–2)	Denver (9–3–2)	Clarkson (11–3–1)	Clarkson (12–3–2)	Clarkson (12–3–2)	Boston College (12–4–0)	Denver (15–4–3)	Boston College (15–5–0)	Denver (17–4–5)	Boston College (16–7–0)	Minnesota–Duluth (17–9–2)	Minnesota–Duluth (17–9–2)	Boston College (21–8–1)	Boston College (23–8–1) (1)	Minnesota–Duluth (22–10–2)	Boston College (24–8–2) (2)	4.
5.	Cornell	Cornell (0–0–0)	Cornell (0–0–0)	Notre Dame (2–0–0)	Notre Dame (4–0–0)	Notre Dame (5–0–1)	Massachusetts (6–2–0) (1)	North Dakota (8–1–2) (1)	Notre Dame (8–2–2)	Clarkson (10–3–1)	Boston College (11–4–0)	Boston College (11–4–0)	Boston College (11–4–0)	Denver (13–4–3)	Boston College (13–5–0)	Denver (15–4–5)	Boston College (15–7–0)	Clarkson (19–6–2)	Clarkson (20–6–2)	Clarkson (22–6–2)	Minnesota–Duluth (18–10–2)	Minnesota–Duluth (20–10–2)	Boston College (24–8–2)	Minnesota–Duluth (22–10–2) (1)	5.
6.	St. Cloud State	Providence (1–0–0)	Boston College (2–0–0)	Wisconsin (3–1–0)	Minnesota–Duluth (3–3–0)	Penn State (6–1–0)	Minnesota–Duluth (4–3–1)	Penn State (9–2–0)	Clarkson (10–3–1)	Penn State (11–4–0)	Ohio State (10–4–2)	Ohio State (10–4–2) т	Ohio State (12–4–2)	Penn State (15–6–0)	Penn State (16–6–0)	Ohio State (15–6–3)	Clarkson (17–6–2)	Minnesota–Duluth (15–9–2)	Denver (17–6–5)	Boston College (19–8–1)	Denver (19–8–5)	Denver (20–9–5)	Denver (21–9–6)	Denver (21–9–6)	6.
7.	Providence	St. Cloud State (0–0–0)	Notre Dame (2–0–0)	Providence (3–1–0)	Wisconsin (4–2–0)	Minnesota–Duluth (3–3–0)	Clarkson (7–2–1)	Massachusetts (7–3–0)	Penn State (10–3–0)	Ohio State (9–4–1)	Penn State (12–5–0)	Denver (11–4–3) т	Denver (11–4–3)	Clarkson (13–4–2)	Clarkson (15–4–2)	Massachusetts (16–7–1)	Massachusetts (16–8–2)	Denver (17–6–5)	Boston College (16–8–1)	Denver (17–8–5)	Clarkson (23–7–2)	Clarkson (23–8–3)	Clarkson (23–8–3)	Clarkson (23–8–3)	7.
8.	Quinnipiac	Notre Dame (0–0–0)	Quinnipiac (2–0–0)	Minnesota–Duluth (1–3–0)	Providence (4–2–0)	Clarkson (5–2–1)	Penn State (7–2–0)	Clarkson (8–3–1)	Minnesota–Duluth (7–4–1)	Northeastern (10–4–2)	Denver (9–4–3)	Penn State (13–6–0)	Penn State (13–6–0)	Ohio State (13–5–2)	Minnesota–Duluth (12–6–2)	Clarkson (16–5–2)	Penn State (17–8–1)	Massachusetts (16–9–2)	Massachusetts (18–9–2)	Massachusetts (18–9–2)	Massachusetts (19–10–2)	Penn State (20–10–4)	Penn State (20–10–4)	Penn State (20–10–4)	8.
9.	Notre Dame	Quinnipiac (0–0–0)	Penn State (2–0–0) (1)	Quinnipiac (3–1–0)	Quinnipiac (4–1–0)	Ohio State (6–1–1)	North Dakota (7–1–1)	Minnesota–Duluth (5–4–1)	Harvard (6–0–0)	Notre Dame (8–4–2)	Massachusetts (11–4–1)	Massachusetts (12–4–1)	Massachusetts (13–4–1)	Minnesota–Duluth (11–6–1)	Ohio State (15–6–2)	Penn State (16–7–1)	Providence (14–6–5)	Penn State (17–9–2)	Penn State (18–9–3)	Arizona State (22–9–3)	Penn State (20–10–4)	Massachusetts (20–11–2)	Massachusetts (21–11–2)	Massachusetts (21–11–2)	9.
10.	Clarkson	Boston College (0–0–0)	Clarkson (1–0–1)	Boston College (2–2–0)	Northeastern (4–1–1)	North Dakota (5–1–1)	Providence (5–3–2)	Harvard (5–0–0)	Massachusetts (8–3–1)	Boston College (9–4–0)	Bowling Green (11–5–1)	Minnesota–Duluth (9–6–1)	Minnesota–Duluth (10–6–1)	Massachusetts (13–6–1)	Massachusetts (14–7–1)	Providence (14–6–5)	Minnesota–Duluth (13–9–2)	Providence (14–7–5)	Arizona State (20–9–3)	Northeastern (17–8–2)	Ohio State (18–10–4)	Bemidji State (20–9–5)	Ohio State (20–11–5)	Ohio State (20–11–5)	10.
11.	Boston College	Clarkson (0–0–0)	St. Cloud State (0–0–2)	Northeastern (3–0–1)	Clarkson (3–2–1)	Providence (4–3–1)	Ohio State (6–3–1)	Ohio State (6–3–1)	Ohio State (7–4–1)	Massachusetts (9–4–1)	Minnesota–Duluth (9–6–1)	Bowling Green (12–6–1)	Bowling Green (12–6–1)	Northeastern (12–5–2)	Providence (13–5–5)	Minnesota–Duluth (12–8–2)	Ohio State (15–8–3)	Arizona State (18–9–3)	UMass Lowell (15–7–5)	Penn State (19–10–3)	Bemidji State (19–8–5)	Ohio State (18–11–5)	Bemidji State (22–10–5)	Bemidji State (22–10–5)	11.
12.	Ohio State	Ohio State (0–0–0)	Ohio State (1–0–1)	Penn State (3–1–0)	Penn State (4–1–0)	Wisconsin (4–4–0)	UMass Lowell (7–2–3)	Providence (6–4–2)	Northeastern (8–4–2)	Harvard (6–1–0)	Northeastern (10–5–2)	Northeastern (11–5–2)	Northeastern (11–5–2)	Providence (11–5–5)	Northeastern (13–6–2)	UMass Lowell (13–6–4)	Arizona State (16–9–3)	Northeastern (14–7–2)	Northeastern (15–8–2)	Ohio State (16–10–4)	UMass Lowell (16–10–5)	UMass Lowell (17–10–6)	UMass Lowell (18–10–6)	UMass Lowell (18–10–6)	12.
13.	Penn State	Penn State (0–0–0)	Providence (1–1–0)	Clarkson (2–1–1)	Ohio State (4–1–1)	Northeastern (4–3–1)	Harvard (3–0–0)	Northeastern (6–4–2)	Providence (7–4–3)	Bowling Green (10–5–0)	Providence (9–5–3)	Providence (9–5–3)	UMass Lowell (10–4–4)	UMass Lowell (11–4–4)	UMass Lowell (12–5–4)	Arizona State (15–8–3)	Northeastern (13–7–2)	Ohio State (16–9–3)	Ohio State (16–10–4)	Bemidji State (18–8–4)	Northeastern (17–10–3)	Arizona State (22–11–3)	Arizona State (22–11–3)	Arizona State (22–11–3)	13.
14.	Western Michigan	Western Michigan (0–0–0)	Western Michigan (1–0–1)	St. Cloud State (0–0–2)	North Dakota (4–1–1)	UMass Lowell (6–2–2)	Northeastern (5–3–2)	Boston College (7–4–0)	Boston College (7–4–0)	Minnesota–Duluth (7–6–1)	UMass Lowell (10–4–4)	UMass Lowell (10–4–4)	Providence (10–5–4)	Notre Dame (10–7–3)	Arizona State (13–8–3)	Northeastern (13–7–2)	UMass Lowell (13–7–5)	UMass Lowell (13–7–5)	Providence (14–9–5)	UMass Lowell (15–9–5)	Arizona State (22–11–3)	Quinnipiac (21–11–2)	Quinnipiac (21–11–2)	Quinnipiac (21–11–2)	14.
15.	Northeastern	Northeastern (0–0–0)	Northeastern (2–0–0)	Ohio State (2–1–1)	Boston College (2–3–0)	Quinnipiac (4–3–0)	Wisconsin (5–5–0)	UMass Lowell (7–3–4)	UMass Lowell (7–3–4)	Providence (8–4–3)	Notre Dame (8–6–2)	Notre Dame (9–7–2)	Notre Dame (9–7–2)	Arizona State (11–8–3)	Bowling Green (13–9–2)	Northern Michigan (13–8–3)	Northern Michigan (14–8–4)	Northern Michigan (16–8–4)	Quinnipiac (17–9–2)	Providence (15–9–6)	Maine (17–10–5)	Maine (17–11–5)	Maine (18–11–5)	Maine (18–11–5)	15.
16.	Wisconsin	Wisconsin (0–0–0)	North Dakota (2–0–0)	North Dakota (2–1–1)	St. Cloud State (1–1–2)	Northern Michigan (6–1–1)	Boston College (5–4–0)	Wisconsin (6–6–0)	Bowling Green (8–5–0)	UMass Lowell (9–3–4)	Arizona State (8–4–2)	Arizona State (9–5–2)	Harvard (7–4–1)	Bowling Green (12–9–1)	Harvard (8–5–2)	Harvard (9–6–2)	Harvard (9–6–4)	Quinnipiac (16–9–1)	Bemidji State (16–8–4)	Quinnipiac (18–10–2)	Western Michigan (16–11–5)	Northeastern (17–12–3)	Western Michigan (18–13–5)	Western Michigan (18–13–5)	16.
17.	Bowling Green	Bowling Green (1–0–0)	Wisconsin (1–1–0)	Bowling Green (3–2–0)	UMass Lowell (4–2–2)	Bowling Green (5–4–0)	Bowling Green (5–4–0)	Bowling Green (7–4–0)	Western Michigan (7–5–2)	Western Michigan (7–5–2)	Harvard (6–4–0)	Harvard (6–4–0)	Arizona State (10–7–3)	Michigan Tech (13–9–1)	Northern Michigan (13–7–2)	Quinnipiac (13–8–1)	Michigan State (13–12–1)	Harvard (10–6–4)	Maine (15–9–4)	Maine (16–10–4)	Quinnipiac (19–11–2)	Western Michigan (16–13–5)	Michigan (18–14–4)	Michigan (18–14–4)	17.
18.	North Dakota	North Dakota (0–0–0)	UMass Lowell (3–1–0)	Western Michigan (1–2–1)	Bowling Green (4–3–0)	Harvard (1–0–0)	Northern Michigan (6–2–2)	Omaha (6–3–1)	Omaha (6–4–2)	Omaha (6–4–2)	Michigan State (8–7–1)	Michigan State (9–8–1)	Michigan State (9–8–1)	Harvard (7–5–2)	Notre Dame (10–9–3)	Bowling Green (13–11–2)	Quinnipiac (14–9–1)	Bemidji State (16–8–4)	Harvard (11–7–4)	Minnesota (14–11–5)	Minnesota (14–12–6)	Providence (16–11–6)	Minnesota (16–14–7)	Minnesota (16–14–7)	18.
19.	Harvard	Harvard (0–0–0)	Harvard (0–0–0)	Harvard (0–0–0)	Harvard (0–0–0)	Boston College (3–4–0)	Omaha (5–2–1)	Northern Michigan (7–3–2)	Wisconsin (6–7–1)	Wisconsin (7–8–1)	Western Michigan (7–7–2)	Western Michigan (7–7–2)	Western Michigan (7–7–2)	Northern Michigan (11–7–2)	Michigan Tech (13–10–2)	Michigan State (12–11–1)	Bemidji State (14–8–4)	Michigan State (13–12–1)	Northern Michigan (16–10–4)	Western Michigan (15–10–5)	Providence (15–11–6)	Minnesota (14–13–7)	Northeastern (18–13–3)	Northeastern (18–13–3)	19.
20.	Arizona State	Boston University (1–0–0)	Boston University (1–0–0)	Minnesota (3–1–0)	Northern Michigan (4–1–1)	Omaha (4–1–1)	Western Michigan (5–3–2)	Western Michigan (6–4–2)	Michigan State (6–5–1)	Arizona State (7–4–1)	Sacred Heart (11–6–1)	Sacred Heart (11–6–1)	Army (13–5–1)	Michigan State (10–9–1)	Quinnipiac (12–8–1) т Michigan State (11–10–1) т	Dartmouth (10–5–3)	Sacred Heart (16–8–2)	Sacred Heart (18–8–2)	Sacred Heart (18–8–2)	Harvard (11–8–6)	AIC (20–11–1)	AIC (21–12–1)	AIC (21–12–1)	AIC (21–12–1)	20.
	Preseason Sep 30	Week 1 Oct 7	Week 2 Oct 14	Week 3 Oct 21	Week 4 Oct 28	Week 5 Nov 4	Week 6 Nov 11	Week 7 Nov 18	Week 8 Nov 25	Week 9 Dec 2	Week 10 Dec 9	Week 11 Dec 16	Week 12 Dec 30	Week 13 Jan 6	Week 14 Jan 13	Week 15 Jan 20	Week 16 Jan 27	Week 17 Feb 3	Week 18 Feb 10	Week 19 Feb 17	Week 20 Feb 24	Week 21 Mar 2	Week 22 Mar 9	Final Mar 23	
		Dropped: Arizona State	Dropped: Bowling Green	Dropped: UMass Lowell; Boston University	Dropped: Western Michigan; Minnesota	Dropped: St. Cloud State	Dropped: Quinnipiac	None	Dropped: Northern Michigan	Dropped: Michigan State	Dropped: Omaha; Wisconsin	None	Dropped: Sacred Heart	Dropped: Western Michigan; Army	None	Dropped: Michigan Tech; Notre Dame	Dropped: Bowling Green; Dartmouth	None	Dropped: Michigan State	Dropped: Northern Michigan; Sacred Heart	Dropped: Harvard	None	Dropped: Providence	None	

== USA Today ==
	Preseason Sep 30	Week 1 Oct 7	Week 2 Oct 14	Week 3 Oct 21	Week 4 Oct 28	Week 5 Nov 4	Week 6 Nov 11	Week 7 Nov 18	Week 8 Nov 25	Week 9 Dec 2	Week 10 Dec 9	Week 11 Dec 16	Week 12 Dec 30	Week 13 Jan 6	Week 14 Jan 13	Week 15 Jan 20	Week 16 Jan 27	Week 17 Feb 3	Week 18 Feb 10	Week 19 Feb 17	Week 20 Feb 24	Week 21 Mar 2	Week 22 Mar 9	Final Apr 13	
1.	Minnesota–Duluth (32)	Minnesota–Duluth (0–0–0) (33)	Denver (4–0–0) (28)	Denver (6–0–0) (34)	Denver (6–0–0) (34)	Denver (8–0–0) (34)	Denver (8–1–1) (13)	Minnesota State (8–1–1) (19)	Minnesota State (10–1–1) (17)	Minnesota State (12–1–1) (21)	Minnesota State (14–1–1) (34)	North Dakota (14–1–2) (26)	North Dakota (14–1–2) (33)	North Dakota (16–1–2) (30)	Cornell (12–1–2) (20)	Cornell (13–1–3) (20)	Cornell (14–1–4) (30)	North Dakota (21–3–3) (30)	North Dakota (21–3–3) (30)	North Dakota (23–3–3) (34)	North Dakota (23–4–4) (16)	Cornell (23–2–4) (19)	Cornell (23–2–4) (23)	Cornell (23–2–4) (23)	1.
2.	Denver (2)	Denver (2–0–0)	Minnesota–Duluth (2–0–0) (2)	Minnesota State (3–0–1)	Minnesota State (5–0–1)	Massachusetts (6–1–0)	Minnesota State (8–1–1) (6)	Cornell (6–0–0) (15)	Cornell (8–0–0) (17)	Cornell (9–0–0) (13)	North Dakota (14–1–2)	Minnesota State (15–2–1) (8)	Cornell (10–1–0)	Cornell (11–1–1) (2)	North Dakota (17–2–2) (8)	North Dakota (18–2–3) (10)	North Dakota (19–3–3) (4)	Cornell (15–2–4) (4)	Cornell (17–2–4) (4)	Cornell (19–2–4)	Cornell (21–2–4) (12)	North Dakota (25–4–4) (13)	North Dakota (26–5–4) (9)	North Dakota (26–5–4) (9)	2.
3.	Massachusetts	Minnesota State (0–0–0)	Minnesota State (2–0–0) (3)	Cornell (0–0–0)	Massachusetts (4–1–0)	Minnesota State (6–1–1)	Notre Dame (7–0–1) (8)	Notre Dame (8–1–1)	North Dakota (10–1–2)	North Dakota (12–1–2)	Cornell (10–1–0)	Cornell (10–1–0)	Minnesota State (16–3–1) (1)	Minnesota State (18–3–1) (2)	Minnesota State (20–3–1) (6)	Minnesota State (22–3–1) (4)	Minnesota State (23–4–1)	Minnesota State (24–4–2)	Minnesota State (26–4–2)	Minnesota State (26–4–2)	Minnesota State (28–4–2) (6)	Minnesota State (29–5–2) (2)	Minnesota State (31–5–2) (2)	Minnesota State (31–5–2) (2)	3.
4.	Minnesota State	Cornell (0–0–0)	Massachusetts (1–0–0)	Notre Dame (2–0–0)	Notre Dame (4–0–0)	Cornell (2–0–0)	Cornell (4–0–0) (7)	Denver (8–2–2)	Notre Dame (8–2–2)	Denver (9–3–2)	Boston College (11–4–0)	Boston College (11–4–0)	Boston College (11–4–0)	Boston College (12–4–0)	Denver (15–4–3)	Boston College (15–5–0)	Denver (17–4–5)	Boston College (16–7–0)	Minnesota–Duluth (17–9–2)	Minnesota–Duluth (17–9–2)	Boston College (21–8–1)	Boston College (23–8–1)	Boston College (24–8–2)	Boston College (24–8–2)	4.
5.	Cornell	Massachusetts (0–0–0)	Cornell (0–0–0)	Massachusetts (3–1–0)	Cornell (0–0–0)	Notre Dame (5–0–1)	Massachusetts (6–2–0)	Penn State (9–2–0)	Denver (9–3–2)	Clarkson (10–3–1)	Clarkson (10–3–1)	Clarkson (12–3–2)	Denver (11–4–3)	Denver (13–4–3)	Boston College (13–5–0)	Denver (15–4–5)	Boston College (15–7–0)	Denver (17–6–5)	Denver (17–6–5)	Boston College (19–8–1)	Minnesota–Duluth (18–10–2)	Minnesota–Duluth (20–10–2)	Minnesota–Duluth (22–10–2)	Minnesota–Duluth (22–10–2)	5.
6.	Providence	Boston College (0–0–0)	Boston College (2–0–0)	Wisconsin (3–1–0)	Minnesota–Duluth (3–3–0)	Penn State (6–1–0)	Minnesota–Duluth (4–3–1)	North Dakota (8–1–2)	Harvard (6–0–0)	Penn State (11–4–0)	Ohio State (10–4–2)	Denver (11–4–3)	Clarkson (12–3–2)	Penn State (15–6–0)	Penn State (16–6–0)	Ohio State (15–6–3)	Massachusetts (16–8–2)	Clarkson (19–6–2)	Boston College (16–8–1)	Clarkson (22–6–2)	Denver (19–8–5)	Denver (20–9–5)	Denver (21–9–6)	Denver (21–9–6)	6.
7.	Boston College	Providence (1–0–0)	Notre Dame (2–0–0)	Providence (3–1–0)	Providence (4–2–0)	Minnesota–Duluth (3–3–0)	Clarkson (7–2–1)	Massachusetts (7–3–0)	Penn State (10–3–0)	Boston College (9–4–0)	Penn State (12–5–0)	Ohio State (10–4–2)	Ohio State (12–4–2)	Ohio State (13–5–2)	Clarkson (15–4–2)	Massachusetts (16–7–1)	Clarkson (17–6–2)	Minnesota–Duluth (15–9–2)	Clarkson (20–6–2)	Denver (17–8–5)	Clarkson (23–7–2)	Penn State (20–10–4)	Penn State (20–10–4)	Penn State (20–10–4)	7.
8.	St. Cloud State	St. Cloud State (0–0–0)	Penn State (2–0–0) (1)	Minnesota–Duluth (1–3–0)	Wisconsin (4–2–0)	Ohio State (6–1–1)	Penn State (7–2–0)	Harvard (5–0–0)	Clarkson (10–3–1)	Ohio State (9–4–1)	Denver (9–4–3)	Penn State (13–6–0)	Penn State (13–6–0)	Clarkson (13–4–2)	Minnesota–Duluth (12–6–2)	Clarkson (16–5–2)	Providence (14–6–5)	Massachusetts (16–9–2)	Massachusetts (18–9–2)	Massachusetts (18–9–2)	Penn State (20–10–4)	Clarkson (23–8–3)	Clarkson (23–8–3)	Clarkson (23–8–3)	8.
9.	Penn State	Notre Dame (0–0–0)	Clarkson (1–0–1)	Penn State (3–1–0)	Quinnipiac (4–1–0)	Clarkson (5–2–1)	North Dakota (7–1–1)	Clarkson (8–3–1)	Minnesota–Duluth (7–4–1)	Harvard (6–1–0)	Massachusetts (11–4–1)	Massachusetts (12–4–1)	Massachusetts (13–4–1)	Minnesota–Duluth (11–6–1)	Ohio State (14–6–2)	Penn State (16–7–1)	Penn State (17–8–1)	Arizona State (18–9–3)	Penn State (18–9–3)	Arizona State (22–9–3)	Massachusetts (19–10–2)	Massachusetts (20–11–2)	Massachusetts (21–11–2)	Massachusetts (21–11–2)	9.
10.	Notre Dame	Penn State (0–0–0)	Quinnipiac (2–0–0)	Boston College (2–2–0)	Northeastern (4–1–1)	North Dakota (5–1–1)	Providence (5–3–2)	Minnesota–Duluth (5–4–1)	Massachusetts (8–3–1)	Notre Dame (8–4–2)	Bowling Green (11–5–1)	Bowling Green (12–6–1)	Minnesota–Duluth (10–6–1)	Massachusetts (13–6–1)	Massachusetts (14–7–1)	Providence (14–6–5)	Minnesota–Duluth (13–9–2)	Providence (14–7–5) (Tied)	Arizona State (20–9–3)	Northeastern (17–8–2)	Ohio State (18–10–4)	Bemidji State (20–9–5)	Ohio State (20–11–5)	Ohio State (20–11–5)	10.
11.	Quinnipiac	Clarkson (0–0–0)	St. Cloud State (0–0–2)	Northeastern (3–0–1)	Clarkson (3–2–1)	Providence (4–3–1)	Ohio State (6–3–1)	Ohio State (6–3–1)	Ohio State (7–4–1)	Bowling Green (10–5–0)	Minnesota–Duluth (9–6–1)	Minnesota–Duluth (9–6–1)	Bowling Green (12–6–1)	UMass Lowell (11–4–4)	Providence (13–5–5)	Minnesota–Duluth (12–8–2)	Ohio State (15–8–3)	Penn State (17–9–2) (Tied)	UMass Lowell (15–7–5)	Penn State (19–10–3)	Bemidji State (19–8–5)	Ohio State (18–11–5)	Bemidji State (22–10–5)	Bemidji State (22–10–5)	11.
12.	Clarkson	Western Michigan (0–0–0)	Providence (1–1–0)	Clarkson (2–1–1)	Penn State (4–1–0)	Wisconsin (4–4–0)	Harvard (3–0–0)	Boston College (7–4–0)	Boston College (7–4–0)	Northeastern (10–4–2)	Northeastern (10–5–2)	Northeastern (11–5–2)	Northeastern (11–5–2)	Providence (11–5–5)	Northeastern (13–6–2)	UMass Lowell (13–6–4)	Arizona State (16–9–3)	Northeastern (14–7–2)	Northeastern (15–8–2)	Ohio State (16–10–4)	Northeastern (17–10–3)	UMass Lowell (17–10–6)	UMass Lowell (18–10–6)	UMass Lowell (18–10–6)	12.
13.	Ohio State	Quinnipiac (0–0–0)	Ohio State (1–0–1)	Quinnipiac (3–1–0)	Ohio State (4–1–1)	Northeastern (4–3–1)	UMass Lowell (7–2–3)	Providence (6–4–2)	Northeastern (8–4–2)	Massachusetts (9–4–1)	UMass Lowell (10–4–4)	UMass Lowell (10–4–4)	UMass Lowell (10–4–4)	Northeastern (12–5–2)	UMass Lowell (12–5–4)	Arizona State (15–8–3)	Northeastern (13–7–2)	Ohio State (16–9–3)	Ohio State (16–10–4)	Bemidji State (18–8–4)	Arizona State (22–11–3)	Arizona State (22–11–3)	Arizona State (22–11–3)	Arizona State (22–11–3)	13.
14.	Northeastern	Ohio State (0–0–0)	Northeastern (2–0–0)	St. Cloud State (0–0–2)	North Dakota (4–1–1)	UMass Lowell (6–2–2)	Northeastern (5–3–2)	Northeastern (6–4–2)	Providence (7–4–3)	Minnesota–Duluth (7–6–1)	Notre Dame (8–6–2)	Arizona State (9–5–2)	Providence (10–5–4)	Notre Dame (10–7–3)	Arizona State (13–8–3)	Northeastern (13–7–2)	UMass Lowell (13–7–5)	UMass Lowell (13–7–5)	Providence (14–9–5)	Quinnipiac (18–10–2)	Western Michigan (16–11–5)	Quinnipiac (21–11–2)	Quinnipiac (21–11–2)	Quinnipiac (22–11–2)	14.
15.	Western Michigan	Wisconsin (0–0–0)	Western Michigan (1–0–1)	Ohio State (2–1–1)	Boston College (2–3–0)	Harvard (1–0–0)	Wisconsin (5–5–0)	Bowling Green (7–4–0)	Bowling Green (8–5–0)	UMass Lowell (9–3–4)	Arizona State (8–4–2)	Providence (9–5–3)	Harvard (7–4–1)	Bowling Green (12–9–1)	Bowling Green (13–9–2)	Northern Michigan (13–8–3)	Northern Michigan (14–8–4)	Quinnipiac (16–9–1)	Quinnipiac (17–9–2)	UMass Lowell (15–9–5)	UMass Lowell (16–10–5)	Western Michigan (16–13–5)	Michigan (18–14–4)	Michigan (18–14–4)	15.
	Preseason Sep 30	Week 1 Oct 7	Week 2 Oct 14	Week 3 Oct 21	Week 4 Oct 28	Week 5 Nov 4	Week 6 Nov 11	Week 7 Nov 18	Week 8 Nov 25	Week 9 Dec 2	Week 10 Dec 9	Week 11 Dec 16	Week 12 Dec 30	Week 13 Jan 6	Week 14 Jan 13	Week 15 Jan 20	Week 16 Jan 27	Week 17 Feb 3	Week 18 Feb 10	Week 19 Feb 17	Week 20 Feb 24	Week 21 Mar 2	Week 22 Mar 9	Final Apr 13	
		Dropped: Northeastern	Dropped: Wisconsin	Dropped: Western Michigan	Dropped: St. Cloud State	Dropped: Quinnipiac; Boston College	None	Dropped: UMass Lowell; Wisconsin	None	Dropped: Providence	Dropped: Harvard	Dropped: Notre Dame	Dropped: Arizona State	Dropped: Harvard	Dropped: Notre Dame	Dropped: Bowling Green	None	Dropped: Northern Michigan	None	Dropped: Providence	Dropped: Quinnipiac	Dropped: Northeastern	Dropped: Western Michigan	None	
