= Western Michigan Broncos men's ice hockey statistical leaders =

Men's ice hockey program

The Western Michigan Broncos men's ice hockey statistical leaders are individual statistical leaders of the Western Michigan Broncos men's ice hockey program in various categories, including goals, assists, points, and saves. Within those areas, the lists identify single-game, single-season, and career leaders. The Broncos represent Western Michigan University in the NCAA's NCHC.

Western Michigan began competing in intercollegiate ice hockey in 1973. These lists are updated through the end of the 2023–24 season.

== Goals ==
Career
Rk	Player	Goals	Seasons
1	Dan Dorion	115	1982–83 1983–84 1984–85 1985–86
2	Jeff Green	109	1986–87 1987–88 1988–89 1989–90
3	Rob Bryden	104	1983–84 1984–85 1985–86 1986–87
4	Stuart Burnie	102	1982–83 1983–84 1984–85 1985–86
5	Ross Fitzpatrick	100	1978–79 1979–80 1980–81 1981–82

Season
Rk	Player	Goals	Season
1	Rob Bryden	46	1986–87
2	Stuart Burnie	43	1985–86

== Assists ==
Career
Rk	Player	Assists	Seasons
1	Wayne Gagné	199	1983–84 1984–85 1985–86 1986–87
2	Paul Polillo	189	1986–87 1987–88 1988–89 1989–90
3	Dan Dorion	178	1982–83 1983–84 1984–85 1985–86

Season
Rk	Player	Assists	Season
1	Wayne Gagné	76	1986–87
2	Dan Dorion	62	1985–86

Single Game
Rk	Player	Assists	Season	Opponent
1	Tim Dunlop	6	1977–78	Lake Superior State
	Wayne Gagné	6	1986–87	Toronto

== Points ==
Career
Rk	Player	Points	Seasons
1	Dan Dorion	293	1982–83 1983–84 1984–85 1985–86
2	Paul Polillo	271	1986–87 1987–88 1988–89 1989–90
3	Wayne Gagné	241	1983–84 1984–85 1985–86 1986–87
4	Jeff Green	234	1986–87 1987–88 1988–89 1989–90
5	Ross Fitzpatrick	225	1978–79 1979–80 1980–81 1981–82
6	Tim Dunlop	198	1974–75 1975–76 1976–77 1977–78
7	Rob Bryden	195	1983–84 1984–85 1985–86 1986–87
8	Chris Brooks	184	1992–93 1993–94 1994–95 1995–96
9	Troy Thrun	183	1983–84 1984–85 1985–86
10	Bob Scurfield	177	1978–79 1979–80 1980–81 1981–82

Season
Rk	Player	Points	Season
1	Dan Dorion	104	1985–86
2	Dan Dorion	91	1983–84

Single Game
Rk	Player	Points	Season	Opponent
1	Tim Dunlop	8	1974–75	St. Mary's

== Saves ==
Career
Rk	Player	Saves	Seasons
1	Glenn Healy	3932	1981–82 1982–83 1983–84 1984–85
2	Bill Horn	3824	1985–86 1986–87 1987–88 1988–89
3	Riley Gill	3444	2006–07 2007–08 2008–09 2009–10

Season
Rk	Player	Saves	Season
1	Glenn Healy	1180	1983–84
2	Glenn Healy	1140	1984–85
3	Daniel Bellissimo	1121	2005–06

Single Game
Rk	Player	Saves	Season	Opponent
1	Glenn Healy	60	1983–84	Bowling Green
2	Riley Gill	54	2008–09	Lake Superior State
	Glenn Healy	54	1983–84	Bowling Green
	Glenn Healy	54	1981–82	Ferris State
5	Jeff Reynaert	52	1999–00	Notre Dame
6	Jerry Kuhn	50	2008–09	Minnesota-Duluth
