= John Saunders (journalist) =

Canadian sports journalist (1955–2016)

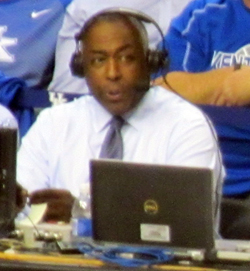
- Saunders providing play-by-play for University of Kentucky's 2015 Blue-White scrimmage
- Born: February 2, 1955; Toronto, Ontario, Canada
- Died: August 10, 2016 (aged 61); Hastings-on-Hudson, New York, U.S.
- Citizenship: Canada; United States of America
- Education: Western Michigan University (1974-76); Ryerson University (1976-78)
- Occupations: Sports journalist, television personality, commentator, announcer
- Years active: 1977–2016
- Employer: The Walt Disney Company
- Television: SportsCenter; NFL Primetime; NHL on ABC; Baseball Night in America; NBA Shootaround; The Sports Reporters
- Spouse: Wanda Saunders (1987–2016)
- Children: 2

John Peterson Saunders (February 2, 1955 – August 10, 2016) was a Canadian-American sports journalist. He worked for ESPN and ABC from 1986 until his death in 2016.

== Early life ==
Saunders attended high school in Châteauguay, Quebec. He was an all-star defenseman in the Montreal junior leagues and received a scholarship to play hockey for Western Michigan University from 1974 to 1976 with his brother, Bernie. He transferred to Ryerson University in Toronto and played for the Rams from 1976 to 1978. After the 1977–78 season, Saunders was named to the Ontario University Athletic Association All-Star team.

== Broadcast career ==
Saunders was the news director for CKNS Radio in Espanola, Ontario in 1978; sports anchor at CKNY-TV in North Bay, Ontario in 1978–1979; and at ATV News in New Brunswick in 1979–1980. He then worked as the main sports anchor for CITY-TV in Toronto from 1980 to 1982. He then moved to the United States to work as a sports anchor at WMAR-TV in Baltimore in 1982–1986.

=== ESPN and ABC Sports ===
Saunders joined ESPN in 1986. He co-hosted NFL Primetime from 1987 to 1989. He was also the secondary studio host for the network's NHL broadcasts from 1986–87 to 1987–88, filling-in for lead host Tom Mees when needed. Then, he became the lead studio host from 1992–93 until 2004 and NHL on ABC from 1992 to 1994 and again from 2000 to 2004 and hosted College Football on ABC from 1992 to 2015. He was the host of ESPN's The Sports Reporters, starting with the illness and subsequent death of Dick Schaap on December 21, 2001. He also hosted ABC's coverage of baseball under the Baseball Night in America banner, including for The Baseball Network, and was involved in ESPN's coverage earlier in his career. He also anchored the 1995 World Series for ABC.

=== Toronto Raptors ===
Saunders was the television play-by-play announcer for the Toronto Raptors from 1995 to 2001, when he was succeeded by Chuck Swirsky.

=== NBA ===
From 2002 to 2004, and occasionally during the 2007 season, Saunders did play-by-play for ESPN's coverage of the NBA, mostly on Sunday nights. He was the studio host of ESPN's NBA Shootaround from 2004 to 2006.

Saunders also served as a back-up play-by-play man for NBA on ABC. He called most of the Team USA games on ESPN for the 2007 FIBA Americas Championship.

=== SportsCenter ===
In 2008, Saunders began hosting the 7 pm Sunday SportsCenter during the NFL season with Chris Berman and analyst Tom Jackson.

== Personal life ==
Saunders was an advocate for juvenile diabetes research, having been diagnosed with Type 1 diabetes as an adult in the early 1980s after his then-girlfriend dragged him to the hospital to get tested. He was also a founding board member of the V Foundation for Cancer Research. He lived in Hastings-on-Hudson, New York, with his wife Wanda, and two daughters. He was the brother of former National Hockey League player Bernie Saunders.

Saunders's memoir, Playing Hurt: My Journey from Despair to Hope, which spans his three-decade career at ESPN and ABC, was published posthumously in 2017.

== Death ==
On August 10, 2016, Saunders's wife discovered him not breathing in their New York home. Emergency responders attended the scene but at around 4 a.m. he was pronounced dead. He was 61 years old. Family members stated Saunders had not been feeling well in the days leading up to his death, but no specific cause of death was publicly announced, though authorities ruled out foul play.

John U. Bacon, who co-authored Saunders's autobiography, stated in the book that the coroner found that Saunders died from a combination of an enlarged heart, complications from his diabetes, and dysautonomia, a condition that affects the part of the nervous system which regulates breathing, blood pressure and heart rate. Saunders's brain was donated to Mount Sinai School of Medicine for research, at his request. He was included in the "In Memoriam" segment at the 2017 ESPY Awards.

Media offices
| Preceded by Julie Moran | ABC's Wide World of Sports host 1995–1996 | Succeeded by Robin Roberts |
