= Hugh McGing =

American ice hockey player (born 1998)

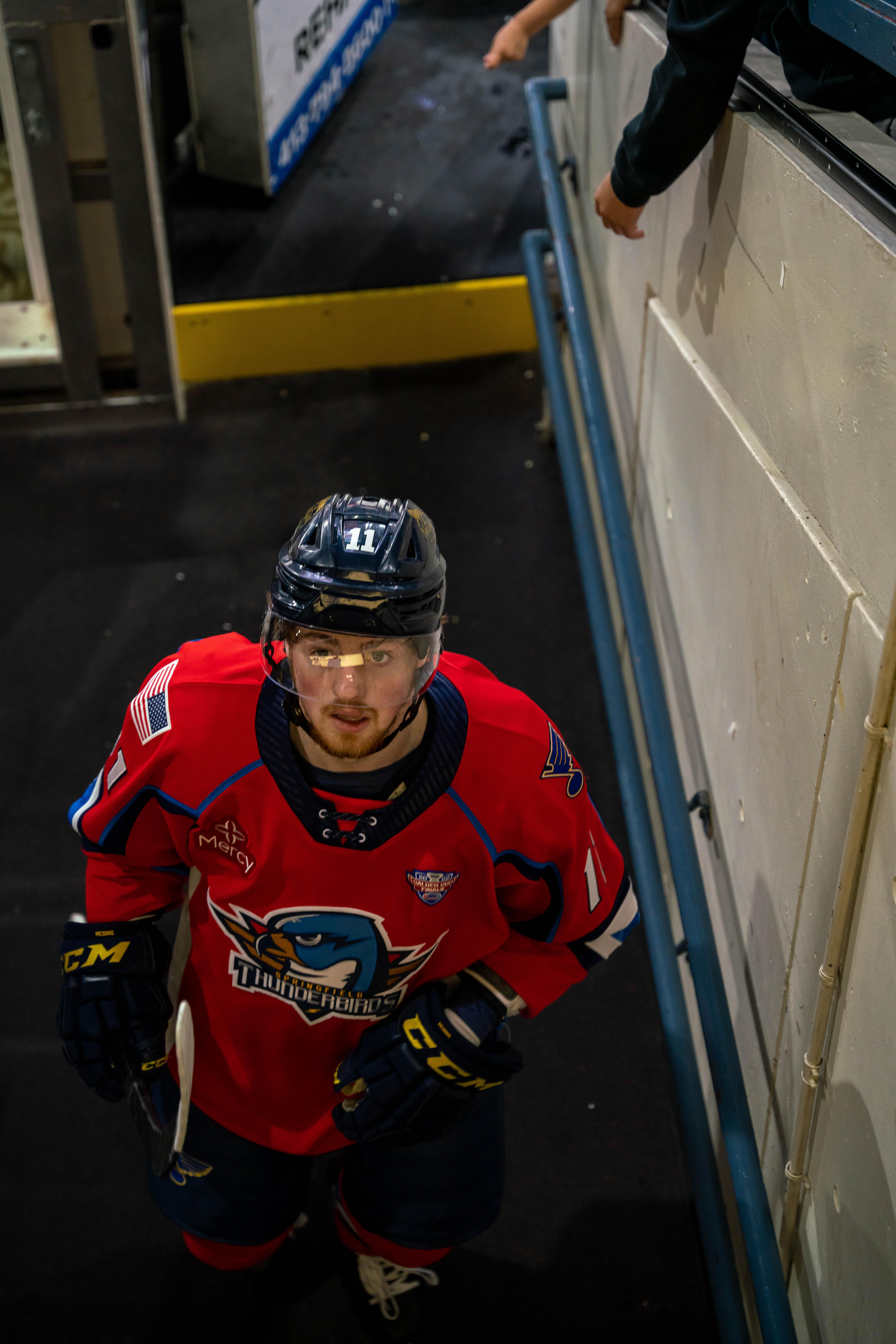
- McGing with the Springfield Thunderbirds in 2022
- Born: July 11, 1998 (age 28) Chicago, Illinois, U.S.
- Height: 5 ft 9 in (175 cm)
- Weight: 174 lb (79 kg; 12 st 6 lb)
- Position: Center
- Shoots: Left
- AHL team Former teams: WBS Penguins; St. Louis Blues
- NHL draft: 138th overall, 2018; St. Louis Blues
- Playing career: 2021–present

Hugh McGing (born July 11, 1998) is an American professional ice hockey center for the Wilkes-Barre/Scranton Penguins in the American Hockey League (AHL). While playing NCAA Division I ice hockey with the Western Michigan Broncos, he was drafted 138th overall by the St. Louis Blues in the 2018 NHL entry draft. Following this, McGing spent four seasons with the Broncos becoming Captain and a First Team All-American. In 2021 he was assigned to the Blues' AHL affiliate, the Utica Comets.

== Early life ==
McGing was born on July 11, 1998, in Chicago, Illinois, to parents James and Breda McGing. His two older brothers, Liam and James, both played hockey.

== Playing career ==
=== Amateur ===
Growing up in Edison Park, Illinois, McGing began his minor ice hockey career with the Niles Rangers then to travel hockey with the Park Ridge Northern Express. He then played AAA hockey with Team Illinois, Chicago Young Americans and the Chicago Mission 14U and 16U AAA of the High Performance Hockey League. In 2014, McGing signed a United States Hockey League (USHL) pre-draft tender with the Cedar Rapids RoughRiders. The Roughriders gave up their 1st-round draft pick for McGing. During his second season with the RoughRiders, McGing signed a National Letter of Intent to play with the Western Michigan Broncos for the 2016–17 season.

=== Collegiate ===
When McGing joined the Broncos in his freshman year, he stood at 5 ft 9 in (1.75 m) and weighed 155-pounds as the youngest player on the roster. He made his collegiate debut on October 5 against the Ferris State Bulldogs and recorded his first collegiate goal against the Miami RedHawks. McGing helped the team qualify for the 2017 NCAA Division I Men's Ice Hockey Tournament and recorded an assist in their loss to the Air Force Falcons. On July 5, 2017, McGing was named to the NCHC Scholar-Athlete Team for maintaining a GPA of 3.50 or higher. During the offseason, McGing was invited to participate at the New York Islanders Development Camp.

McGing returned to the Broncos for his sophomore season which he finished with a career-high 30 points in 36 games. During the season, he recorded a three-game point streak where he accumulated seven points against Michigan State and Denver Pioneers. On December 5, 2017, McGing was named to the preliminary roster for the United States men's national junior ice hockey team that would compete in the 2018 World Junior Ice Hockey Championships, As a result of his play, McGing was the co-recipient of the Rob Hodge Most Valuable Player with teammate Dawson DiPietro. He was also named to the NCHC All-Academic team with a 3.71 GPA and NCHC Distinguished Scholar Athlete.

During the summer before his junior year, McGing was drafted 138th overall by the St. Louis Blues in the 2018 NHL entry draft and was invited to their Prospect Camp. Upon returning from camp, McGing played in all 37 games and accumulated 11 goals and 20 points. As a result, he was named to the Second Team All-NCHC for the first time in his career. On May 2, 2019, McGing was named an NCAA Statistical Champion for short-handed goals after finishing the season with three short-handed goals and tying with eight others across the nation.

After attending Development Camp, McGing returned to the Broncos for his senior season, which, despite being shortened due to the COVID-19 pandemic, was a record-breaking campaign. Before the season began, McGing was named to the 2019-20 National Collegiate Hockey Conference Preseason All-Conference team and appointed team captain. He subsequently led the team with 13 goals and 22 assists for 35 points, which included his first collegiate hat-trick in an 8–4 win over the RedHawks. In late January, McGing was one of 20 NCAA men's ice hockey student-athletes named a candidate for the 2019-20 Senior CLASS Award. On March 20, 2020, McGing concluded his collegiate career with 117 points in 146 regular-season games and signed a two-year, two-way entry-level contract with the St. Louis Blues. McGing was named a First Team All-American, becoming the first Bronco since defenseman Wayne Gagné in 1987 to earn such honor and 11th overall.

=== Professional ===
After attending the St. Louis Blues training camp prior to the 2020–21 season, McGing was reassigned to their American Hockey League (AHL) affiliate, the Utica Comets. On February 17, 2021, McGing recorded his first professional point in a 5–2 win over the Syracuse Crunch.

Playing the first six years of his professional career within the Blues organization, McGing left as a free agent and was signed to a one-year AHL contract with the Wilkes-Barre/Scranton Penguins, affiliate of the Pittsburgh Penguins, for the 2026–27 season on July 7, 2026.

== Career statistics ==
=== Regular season and playoffs ===
			Regular season					Playoffs
Season	Team	League	GP	G	A	Pts	PIM	GP	G	A	Pts	PIM
2014–15	Cedar Rapids RoughRiders	USHL	54	11	8	19	18	3	0	0	0	0
2015–16	Cedar Rapids RoughRiders	USHL	60	23	28	51	56	5	0	2	2	0
2016–17	Western Michigan University	NCHC	39	8	14	22	28	—	—	—	—	—
2017–18	Western Michigan University	NCHC	36	9	21	30	40	—	—	—	—	—
2018–19	Western Michigan University	NCHC	37	16	14	30	55	—	—	—	—	—
2019–20	Western Michigan University	NCHC	35	13	22	35	52	—	—	—	—	—
2020–21	Utica Comets	AHL	23	3	1	4	8	—	—	—	—	—
2021–22	Springfield Thunderbirds	AHL	67	14	20	34	36	18	4	3	7	12
2022–23	Springfield Thunderbirds	AHL	71	17	22	39	66	2	0	0	0	0
2022–23	St. Louis Blues	NHL	1	0	0	0	0	—	—	—	—	—
2023–24	Springfield Thunderbirds	AHL	51	8	31	39	40	—	—	—	—	—
2023–24	St. Louis Blues	NHL	5	0	0	0	0	—	—	—	—	—
2024–25	Springfield Thunderbirds	AHL	68	14	20	34	60	3	0	0	0	2
2025–26	Springfield Thunderbirds	AHL	66	12	19	31	59	11	2	4	6	4
2025–26	St. Louis Blues	NHL	3	1	1	2	0	—	—	—	—	—
NHL totals			9	1	1	2	0	—	—	—	—	—

=== International ===
Year	Team	Event	Result	GP	G	A	Pts	PIM
2015	United States	IH18	5th	4	0	0	0	2
Junior totals				4	0	0	0	2

== Awards and honors ==
Award	Year
College
NCHC Second All-Star Team	2019
NCHC First All-Star Team	2020
West First All-American Team	2020
Lowes Senior Class All-Americans 1st Team	2020
