= Playing Hurt =

Book by John Saunders

Playing Hurt: My Journey from Despair to Hope
- Playing Hurt cover art.
- Author: John Saunders; John U. Bacon
- Language: English
- Subject: Memoir
- Publisher: Da Capo Press
- Publication date: August 8, 2017
- Publication place: United States
- Media type: Print (hardcover), audiobook, e-book
- Pages: 328
- ISBN: 978-0306824739
- OCLC: 995048699

Playing Hurt: My Journey from Despair to Hope is a memoir written by John Saunders with bestselling author John U. Bacon, published posthumously on August 8, 2017.

== Overview ==
Saunders, a journalist and broadcaster of over thirty years for ESPN and ABC, published Playing Hurt in 2017. The memoir is divided into four parts and spans Saunders' life from his time growing up in Canada to the final years of his life and deals with topics like Saunders' ongoing battle with depression, his numerous suicide attempts, his recovery in the wake of his on-set brain injury in 2011, and his heart attack in 2012. Saunders and Bacon had begun work on the book prior to Saunders passing away in August 2016 at age 61. After Saunders' death, Bacon continued to work on the manuscript with the help of Saunders’ family, friends and physicians. Bacon said of the book, “...in the end this is John’s story, told from his point of view, based primarily on his recollections.”

The foreword was written by Mitch Albom.

== Reception ==
Playing Hurt debuted on the New York Times bestseller list. The book has received positive reviews and Saunders has received praise for his openness and authenticity, with Awful Announcing calling it an "important, enlightening read." The Washington Post described the book as, "dark, edgy, revelatory and quite sad."
