= Bernie Saunders =

Canadian ice hockey player (born 1956)

- Born: June 21, 1956 (age 69) Montreal, Quebec, Canada
- Height: 5 ft 10 in (178 cm)
- Weight: 174 lb (79 kg; 12 st 6 lb)
- Position: Winger
- Shot: Right
- Played for: Quebec Nordiques
- NHL draft: Undrafted
- Playing career: 1979–1984

Bernie Saunders (born June 21, 1956) is a Canadian former professional ice hockey right winger who played 10 games in the National Hockey League for the Quebec Nordiques during the 1979–80 and 1980–81 seasons.

Saunders was the fifth Black hockey player to play in the NHL. The others before him were Willie O'Ree, Mike Marson, Bill Riley, and Tony McKegney.

== Early life ==
Saunders was born in Montreal, Quebec, and moved to the Toronto area when he was a toddler. He returned to Québec as a teenager and spent most of high school at H.S. Billings High School in Châteauguay, Quebec. The Saunders family moved back to the Toronto area his senior year of high school, and Bernie graduated from Ajax High School, in Ajax, Ontario. It was during this year playing junior hockey in Ontario that Saunders first experienced racism on the ice.

== Early and college career ==
While in Châteaguay, Saunders and his brother John played Jr B hockey for the Châteauguay Wings under the tutelage of Jacques Demers, who would go on to coach in the WHA and NHL. When the family moved to the Toronto area, Bernie played for the Pickering Panthers in the Metro Jr B league for two years under coach Sherry Bassin. The Panthers were a strong franchise and several of the team went on to play for the Saint Louis Billikens in the old CCHA. The Saunders brothers played college hockey at Western Michigan University in the 1970s along with future New York Rangers GM Neil Smith.

John finished his career at Ryerson Polytechnical Institute in Toronto where he was an Ontario University Athletic Association All-Star for the Rams. Bernie finished his WMU career with 76 goals, 78 assists, and 154 points in four seasons, leading WMU in goals three times and twice being recognized as the team's MVP. He captained the WMU hockey team his senior year and was inducted into the Western Michigan University Athletic Hall of Fame in 1994. There is also a banner honoring him at Lawson Arena, the home rink of WMU hockey.

== Pro career ==
After completing his career at WMU, Saunders signed with Quebec Nordiques in the Nordiques' first year in the NHL after switching over from the defunct WHA. In his first professional year, Saunders was assigned to the Cincinnati Stingers in the old Central Hockey League (CHL) where he recorded 13 goals and 11 assists for 24 points in 29 games. The NHL/WHA merger dictated that each ex-WHA team had to send players to stock Cincinnati which was one of the ex-WHA teams that did not enter the NHL. However, the Stingers folded operations at Christmas time (79/80 season) so Saunders was reassigned to the Syracuse Firebirds in the American Hockey League (AHL) where he finished his first professional year. He recorded 23 goals, 17 assists, and 40 points in the AHL for total rookie stats in the minors with 36 goals, and 28 assists for 64 points in 67 games. Saunders played 4 games with the Nordiques at the end of that year before returning to Syracuse to play in the AHL playoffs.

The following year, the Nordiques failed to have an AHL/CHL farm team as the Syracuse Firebirds folded at the end of the year. As a result, Saunders was reassigned to play in the Montreal Canadiens organization for the Nova Scotia Voyageurs on loan from the Nordiques along with Reg Thomas and Roland Cloutier. His second-year statistics were 17 goals, 21 assists, and 38 points for the Voyageurs; he also played in 6 games with the Nordiques that year where he recorded one assist. After being sent back to the minors with the Nordiques' new farm team, Fredericton Express, at the end of that year Saunders signed with the Kalamazoo Wings in the IHL and playing a pre-retirement year in the city where he played as a college player. He scored 38 goals and 37 assists for 75 points in an injury-plagued final year (70 games).

Decades later, Saunders, disgusted at the racist murder of George Floyd and the racist treatment Black hockey players are still receiving in the NHL and the media, wrote about his own experiences in a 2021 autobiography, Shut Out: The Game That Did Not Love Me Black,

== Personal life and family ==
Saunders' brother was the late ESPN sportscaster, John Saunders. After his playing career ended, Saunders fell back on his degree from Western Michigan and spent 17 years in the pharmaceutical industry with the Upjohn Company before moving on to other commercial positions within the industry.

Saunders has three sons: Jonathan, Shawn, and Andrew. Jonathan played defense for the Miami RedHawks men's ice hockey team; Shawn played four years at UMass, while Andrew pursued a career in law enforcement while attending East Carolina University. Saunders is retired and currently resides in Myrtle Beach, South Carolina.

== Career statistics ==
=== Regular season and playoffs ===
			Regular season					Playoffs
Season	Team	League	GP	G	A	Pts	PIM	GP	G	A	Pts	PIM
1975–76	Western Michigan University	CCHA	34	7	12	19	18	—	—	—	—	—
1976–77	Western Michigan University	CCHA	37	24	16	40	24	—	—	—	—	—
1977–78	Western Michigan University	CCHA	33	22	29	51	30	—	—	—	—	—
1978–79	Western Michigan University	CCHA	36	23	21	44	11	—	—	—	—	—
1978–79	Kalamazoo Wings	IHL	3	1	3	4	0	—	—	—	—	—
1979–80	Quebec Nordiques	NHL	4	0	0	0	0	—	—	—	—	—
1979–80	Cincinnati Stingers	CHL	29	13	11	24	16	—	—	—	—	—
1979–80	Syracuse Firebirds	AHL	38	23	17	40	29	4	1	0	1	2
1980–81	Quebec Nordiques	NHL	6	0	1	1	8	—	—	—	—	—
1980–81	Nova Scotia Voyageurs	AHL	69	17	21	38	88	6	1	1	2	4
1981–82	Kalamazoo Wings	IHL	70	38	37	75	57	5	3	2	5	6
1983–84	Kalamazoo Wings	IHL	1	0	0	0	0	—	—	—	—	—
AHL totals			107	40	38	78	117	10	2	1	3	6
NHL totals			10	0	1	1	8	—	—	—	—	—

== Awards and honours ==
Award	Year	Ref.
All-CCHA Second Team	1977–78	
