= Ray Staszak =

American ice hockey player (born 1962)

- Born: December 1, 1962 (age 63) Philadelphia, Pennsylvania, U.S.A.
- Height: 6 ft 0 in (183 cm)
- Weight: 200 lb (91 kg; 14 st 4 lb)
- Position: Forward
- Shot: Right
- Played for: Detroit Red Wings
- NHL draft: Undrafted
- Playing career: 1985–1986

Ray Staszak (born December 1, 1962) is an American retired professional ice hockey player. He played four games in the National Hockey League with the Detroit Red Wings during the 1985–86 season. A highly touted prospect and a free agent out of college, he signed a million dollar contract with the Red Wings, the first college free agent to do so.

Staszak played high school hockey at Archbishop Ryan High School in Philadelphia, and also participated in midget hockey in his native Bucks County. He later played in the United States Hockey League.

== Career statistics ==
=== Regular season and playoffs ===
			Regular season					Playoffs
Season	Team	League	GP	G	A	Pts	PIM	GP	G	A	Pts	PIM
1982–83	Austin Mavericks	USHL	30	18	13	31	—	—	—	—	—	—
1983–84	University of Illinois-Chicago	CCHA	31	15	17	32	42	—	—	—	—	—
1984–85	University of Illinois-Chicago	CCHA	38	37	35	72	98	—	—	—	—	—
1985–86	Detroit Red Wings	NHL	4	0	1	1	7	—	—	—	—	—
1985–86	Adirondack Red Wings	AHL	26	13	8	21	41	16	2	3	5	70
NHL totals			4	0	1	1	7	—	—	—	—	—

== Awards and honors ==
Award	Year
All-CCHA First Team	1984–85
AHCA West Second-Team All-American	1984–85

Awards and achievements
Preceded by Paul Pooley	CCHA Player of the Year; 1984–85	Succeeded by Dan Dorion
