= Ryan Miller =

American ice hockey player (born 1980)

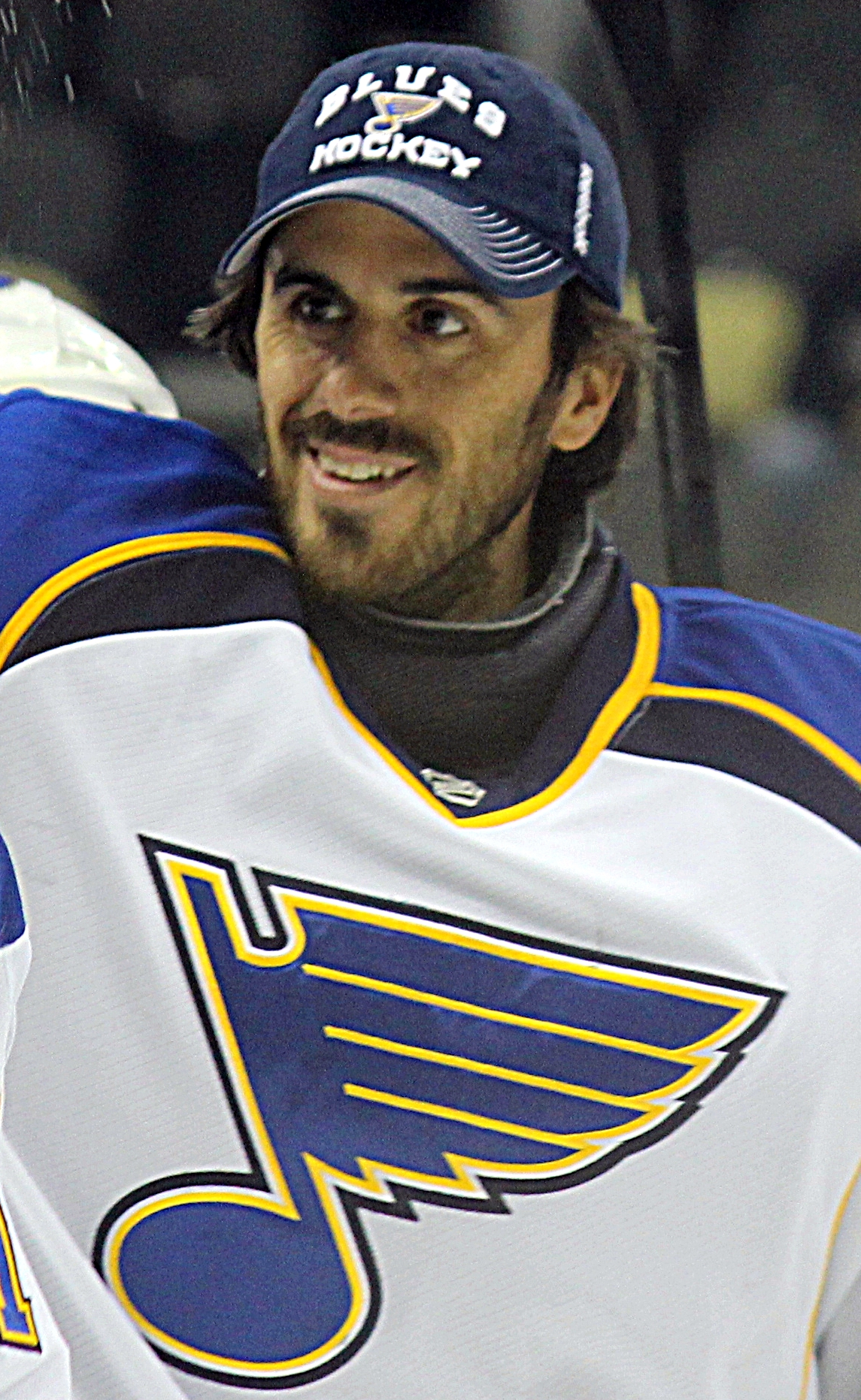
- Miller with the St. Louis Blues in 2014
- Born: July 17, 1980 (age 46) East Lansing, Michigan, U.S.
- Height: 6 ft 2 in (188 cm)
- Weight: 170 lb (77 kg; 12 st 2 lb)
- Position: Goaltender
- Caught: Left
- Played for: Buffalo Sabres; St. Louis Blues; Vancouver Canucks; Anaheim Ducks
- National team: United States
- NHL draft: 138th overall, 1999; Buffalo Sabres
- Playing career: 2002–2021

Ryan Dean Miller (born July 17, 1980) is an American former professional ice hockey player. He played as a goaltender for 18 seasons in the National Hockey League (NHL) for the Buffalo Sabres, St. Louis Blues, Vancouver Canucks, and Anaheim Ducks. Miller was drafted 138th overall by the Buffalo Sabres in the 1999 NHL entry draft. In 2010, he won the Vezina Trophy as the league's best goaltender. Miller was the winningest American-born goaltender in NHL history from February 2019 until March 2024, when he was passed by Jonathan Quick. In January 2023, Miller was inducted into the Buffalo Sabres Hall Of Fame, and his #30 was retired. In April 2025, Miller was also inducted into the Rochester Americans Hall of Fame.

He was selected to play for the United States in the 2010 Winter Olympics in Vancouver as the team's starting goaltender. He won a silver medal with the team and was named most valuable player of the tournament. Four years later, he was selected for the 2014 Winter Olympics. Miller is one of 39 goaltenders in NHL history to win 300 games in his career.

Miller is known for his hybrid style of goaltending. He is the older brother of former NHL forward Drew Miller.

== Early life ==
Miller grew up in East Lansing, Michigan. He started playing youth hockey in California. In youth hockey, Miller originally played as a forward, however, Miller became frustrated with the poor play of his team's goaltender, so he begged his coach as well as his father, Dean Miller, to let him try it out. His father told him that if he could get two goals and three assists the next game he would buy Ryan a catching glove. Miller finished the game with two goals and three assists in the win. His brother Drew and cousins Kelly, Kevin and Kip all played in the NHL. All five attended Michigan State University, where Ryan Miller played goaltender for three years.

== Playing career ==
=== Buffalo Sabres (2002–2014) ===
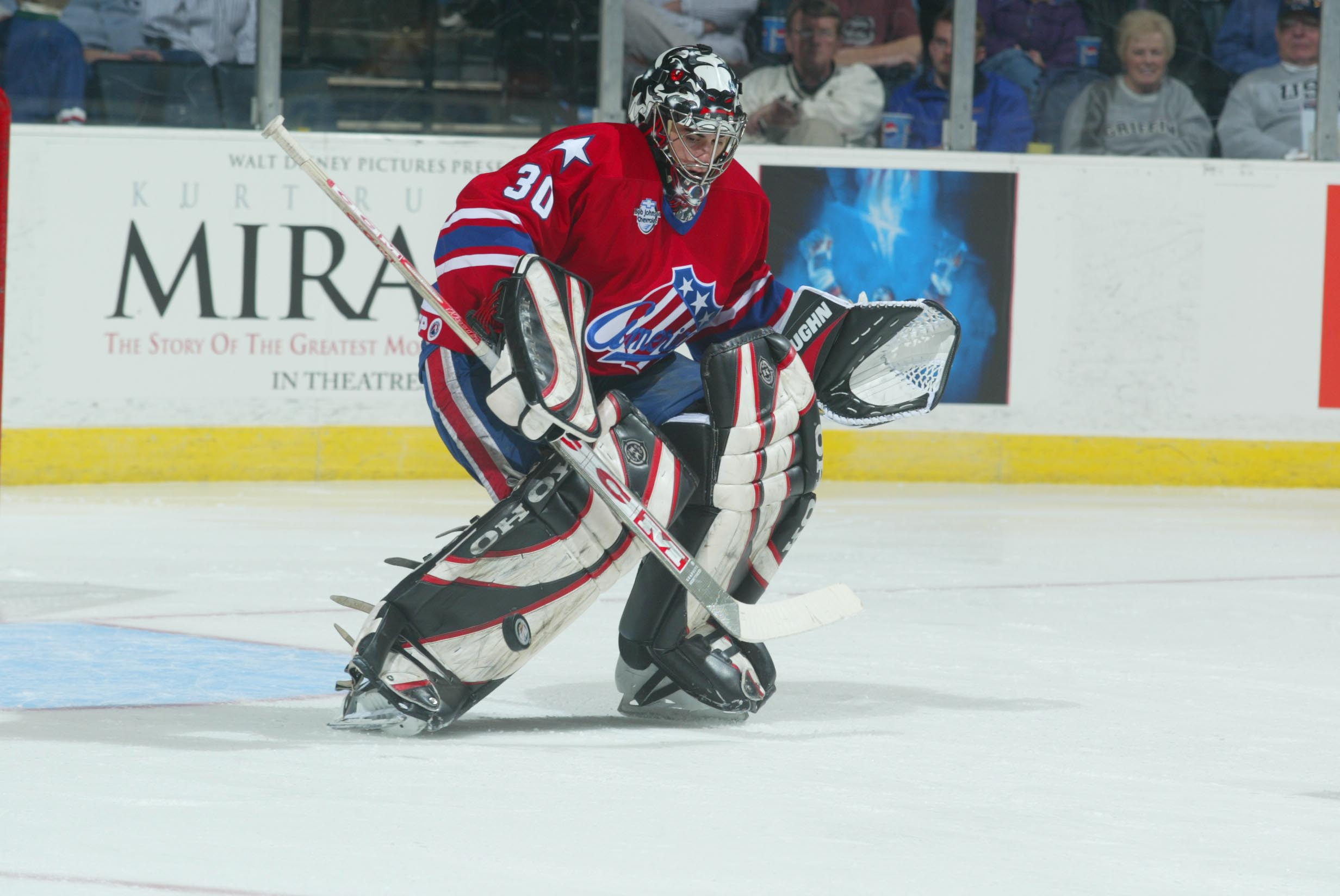
Miller with the Rochester Americans in 2004

After three seasons with Michigan State, Miller moved to the American Hockey League (AHL), where he played for the Buffalo Sabres' affiliate, the Rochester Americans, from the 2002–03 season until the 2004–05 season. During the 2002–03 season, he played 15 regular season games for Buffalo. In the 2004–05 season, with the NHL not playing due to a lockout, he won 41 games for the Americans, tying Gerry Cheevers' record. He finished the season with a 2.45 GAA.

In 2004–05, the Americans were the North Division and Regular Season champions in the AHL. They lost in the division finals, however, to the Manitoba Moose.

Miller finished the 2005–06 season by establishing himself as the starting goaltender for the Sabres. He ranked 11th among NHL goaltenders with a 2.60 GAA and ninth in a save percentage, with .914. Miller led the Sabres to a surprise season, winning 30 games and advancing to the conference finals.

After the 2005–06 season, Miller became a restricted free agent and waived his right to arbitration. Mike Liut, Miller's agent, continued to negotiate with the Sabres through the summer. On September 8, 2006, the Sabres announced that they had re-signed Miller to a three-year contract.

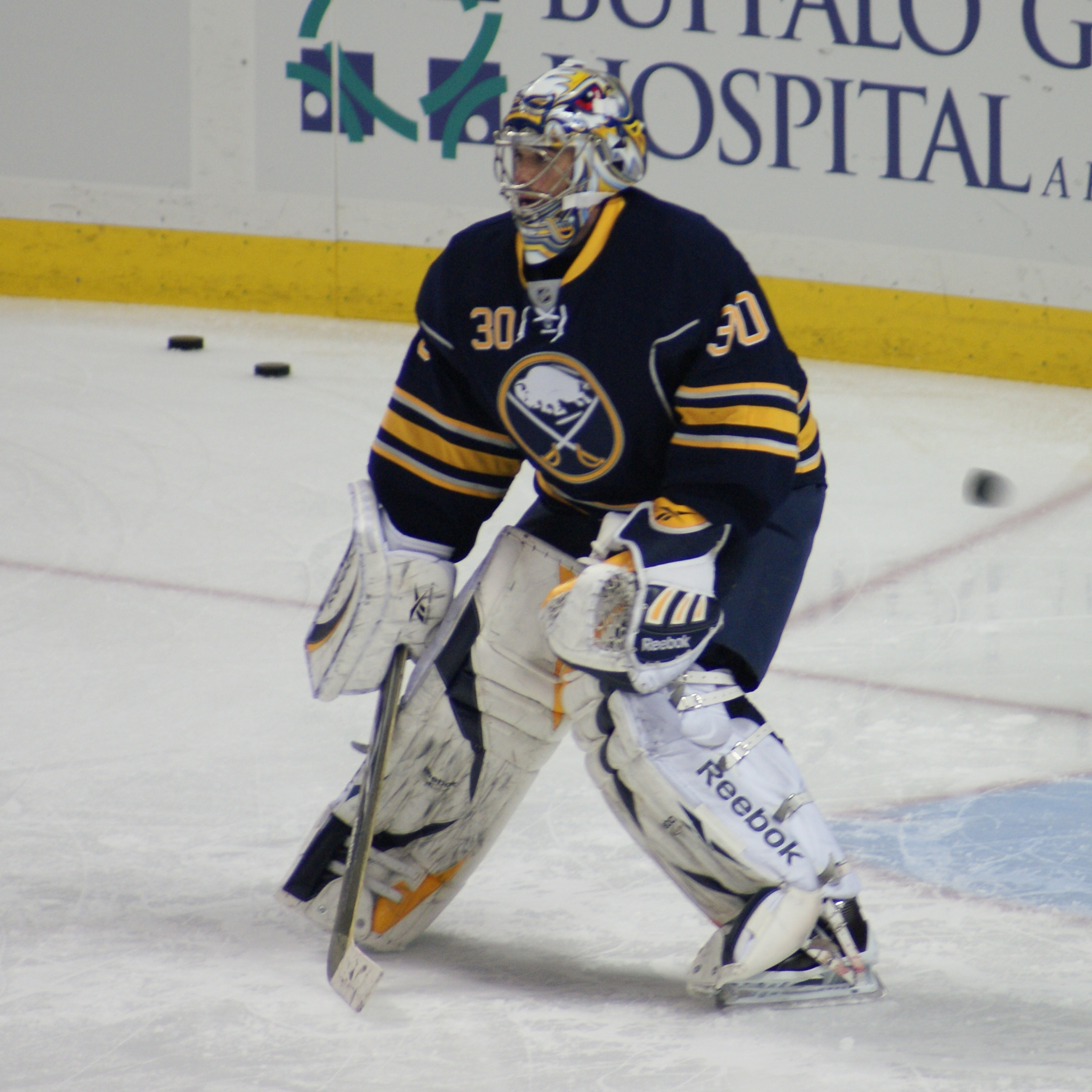
Miller with the Buffalo Sabres in 2010

The 2006–07 season would prove a successful one. In his first season starting with the number one job, Miller and his team won the first 10 games in a row. Miller was voted the starting goaltender for the Eastern Conference of the 2007 NHL All-Star Game. In a 12–9 loss, Miller played the first period and allowed three goals. Miller also gained a reputation of a shootout specialist with his technique of challenging the shooter outside the crease. That season he was 10–4 in shootouts, with Martin Brodeur of the New Jersey Devils being his closest rival at 10 wins and 6 losses. In 63 games played that season, Miller posted a .911 save percentage and a 2.72 GAA backing a more offensively-oriented team.

In the post-season of that year, the Sabres advanced to their second conference finals in as many years, losing to the Ottawa Senators in five games. Miller posted a .922 save percentage and 2.22 GAA in the playoffs.

On October 11, the Sabres won their second home game of the 2007–08 season with a 6–0 win over the Atlanta Thrashers. Miller earned a shutout, stopping 20 shots in a game following the death of his 18-year-old cousin, Matt, who had died the Monday before of a complication with a bone-marrow transplant. At the close of the game, Miller raised his stick to the home crowd in tribute and received star honors for his effort in net.

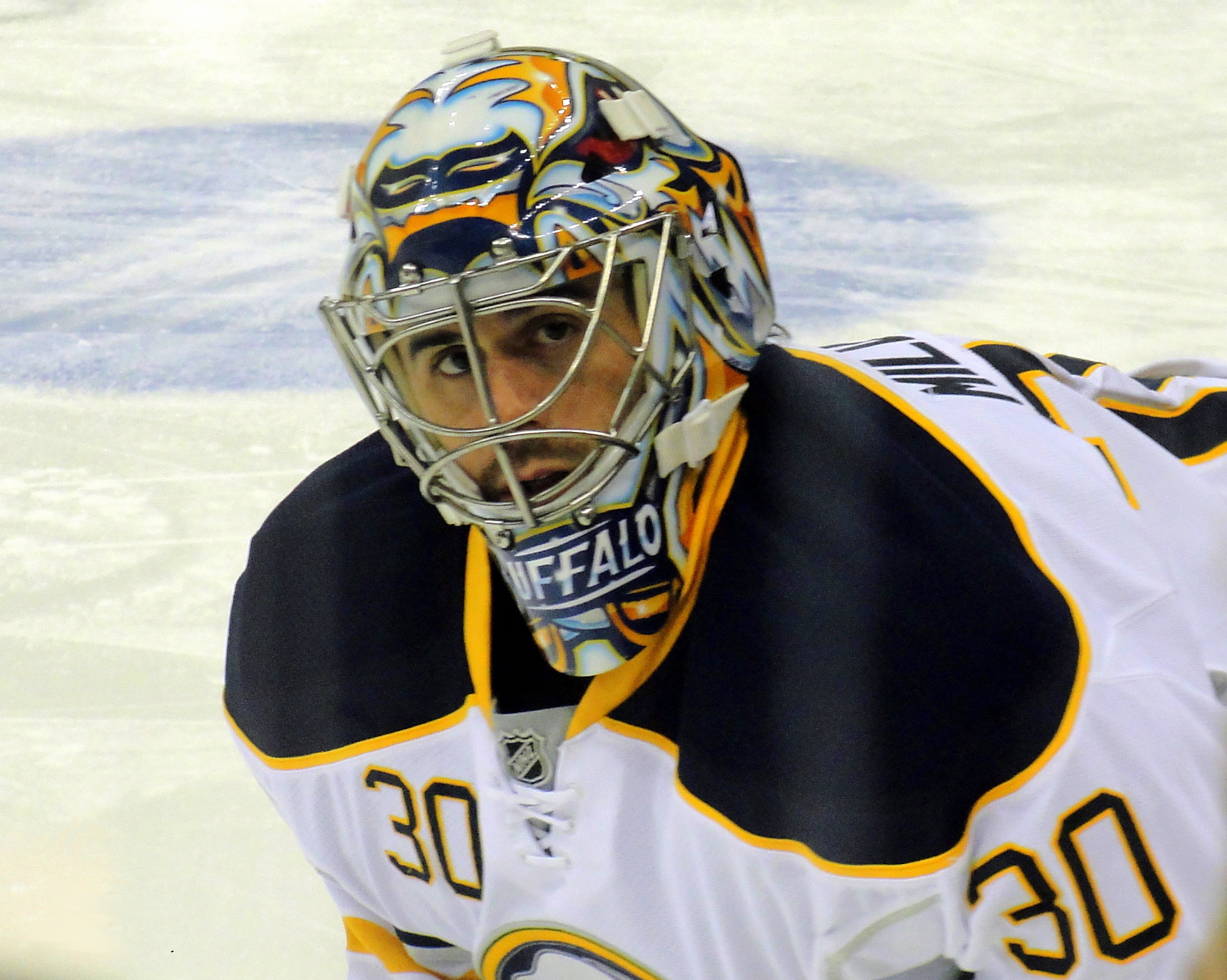
Miller with the Sabres in 2011

On January 1, 2008, Miller played with the Sabres in the AMP Energy NHL Winter Classic, which was the first outdoor NHL game to be held in the United States. The game was played at Ralph Wilson Stadium, home to National Football League's Buffalo Bills, in Orchard Park, New York. The Sabres lost in a shoot-out to the Pittsburgh Penguins, but Miller only allowed one goal (out of 25 shots) in regulation. On March 28, Miller played in his 73rd game of the season, breaking the Sabres franchise record for most games played in a season, passing Grant Fuhr, Dominik Hašek and Martin Biron. Miller finished the season with 76 games played, recording a 2.64 GAA and a .906 save percentage.

On July 18, 2008, Miller signed a five-year contract extension worth $31.25 million with the Sabres. The contract took effect at the start of the 2009–10 season. Miller suffered a high-end ankle sprain on February 22, 2009, in a game against the New York Rangers, which kept him out of action until late March. Despite Miller's strong 34–18–6 record during the 2008–09 season, the Sabres narrowly missed out on qualifying for a playoff berth.

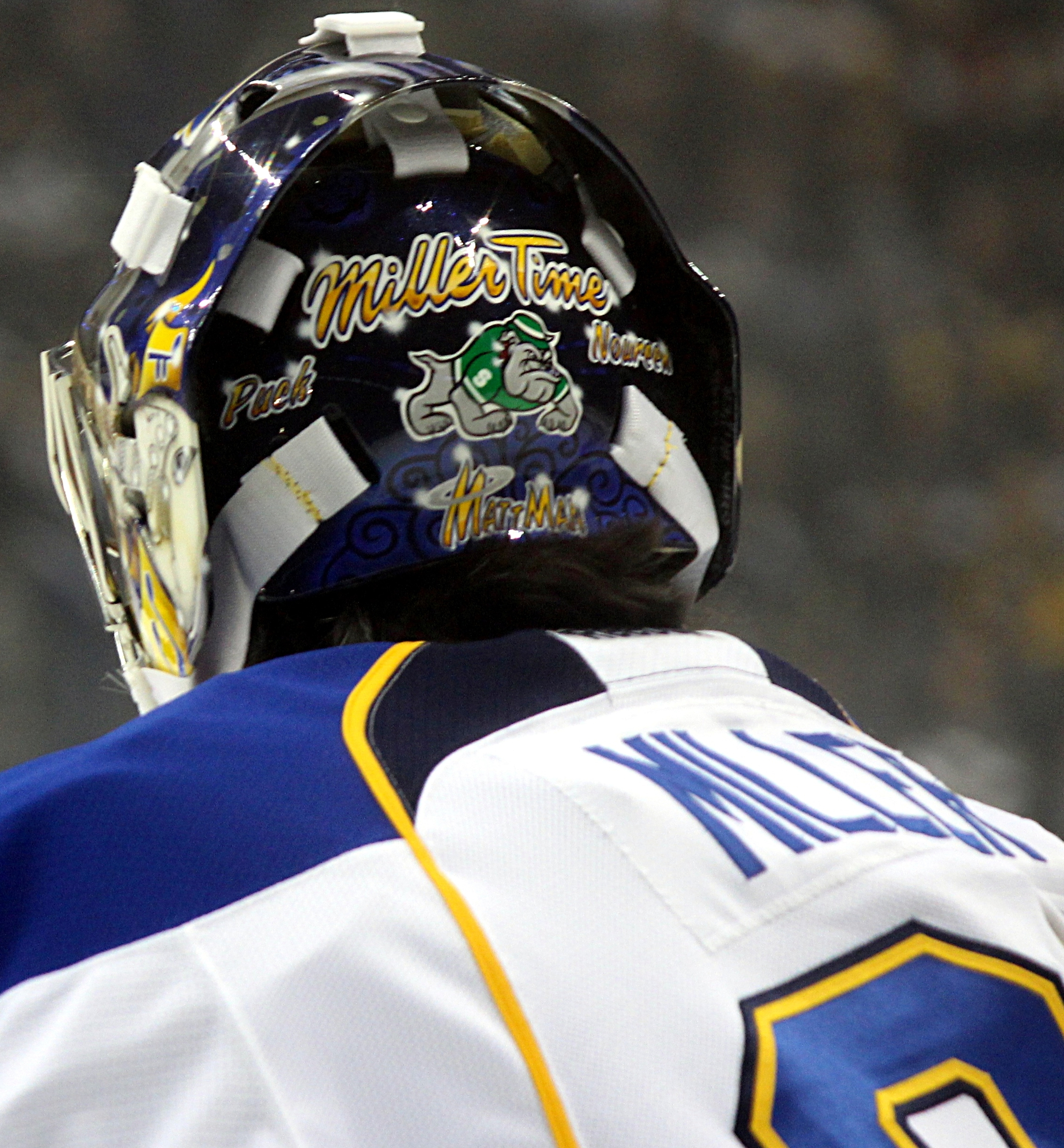
Miller's helmet with the words "Matt Man"

Miller's popularity in both Buffalo and for American hockey has spawned several nicknames, including "Miller Time" (after the Miller brewing company's advertising slogan), while the Toronto media has nicknamed him the "Leaf Killer: Ryan Miller" for his excellent success against one of the Sabres top rivals, the Toronto Maple Leafs.

In the 2009–10 season, Miller played exceptionally, with a GAA of under 2.00 before the Olympic break. He finished the season with a 2.22 GAA and a .929 save percentage. He led the Buffalo Sabres to a Northeast Division title and posted 41 wins, breaking his former record of 40 wins posted in 2006–07. His play became even more popular around the U.S after being nominated for the Vezina Trophy for the league's best goaltender. On June 23, 2010, in Las Vegas, Nevada, at the 2010 NHL Award Ceremony, Miller was announced as the winner of the 2010 Vezina Trophy, beating New Jersey Devils goaltender Martin Brodeur and Phoenix Coyotes goaltender Ilya Bryzgalov. That same night, Miller also became the first American player to win the NHL Foundation Player Award.

Late in the 2010–11 season, on March 29, 2011, during a game against the Toronto Maple Leafs, despite finishing the game in a 4–3 losing cause, Miller suffered what was later reported to be an "upper body injury." Initial speculation on the specifics of Miller's injury ranged from a concussion resulting from a Brian Rolston shot that rang off his mask, to a bruised collarbone from a Dion Phaneuf shot.

On February 4, 2012, Miller surpassed Dominik Hašek as the franchise leader in career wins with 235 in a 4–3 shootout win against the New York Islanders at Nassau Coliseum. Miller accomplished this feat in six-and-a-half years as the starting goaltender for Buffalo, while it took Hašek nine years.

The 2012–13 NHL season did not go well for the Sabres, as they finished 12th in the Eastern Conference and failed to qualify for the playoffs for the second consecutive year. Miller finished the season with a 2.81 GAA and a .915 save percentage.

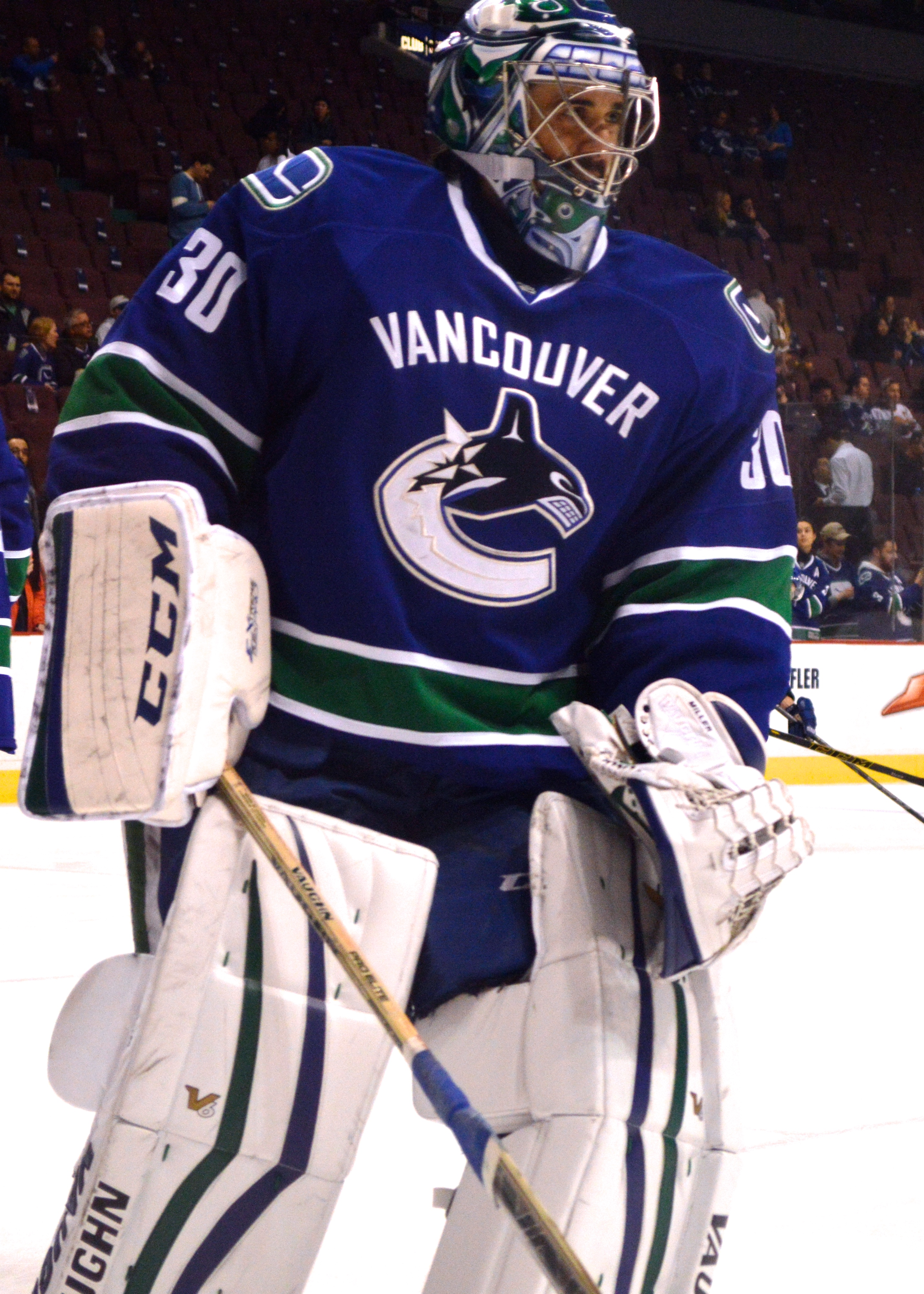
Miller with the Vancouver Canucks in 2015

=== St. Louis Blues (2014) ===
On February 28, 2014, Miller and forward Steve Ott were traded from the Sabres to the St. Louis Blues in exchange for Jaroslav Halák, Chris Stewart, William Carrier and two future draft picks. He would make his Blues debut along with Ott on March 3, stopping 23 shots in a 4–2 victory over the Phoenix Coyotes. Miller and the Blues lost in the first round of the 2014 Stanley Cup playoffs to the defending 2013 Stanley Cup champions, the Chicago Blackhawks.

On May 19, the Blues signed Brian Elliott to a three-year contract and Blues General Manager Doug Armstrong announced that Elliott would join Jake Allen to form their goaltending tandem. Miller was not re-signed.

=== Vancouver Canucks (2014–2017) ===
Miller became an unrestricted free agent on July 1, 2014, and signed a three-year, $18 million contract to become the starting goaltender with the Vancouver Canucks. On October 28, Miller became the 30th goaltender in NHL history to reach 300 career wins. He made 29 saves as the Canucks beat the Carolina Hurricanes 4–1. On January 30, 2015, after beating his former team, the Buffalo Sabres, 5–2, Miller has beaten every team in the NHL at least once. However, on February 22, Miller was injured after Jannik Hansen crashed into him, ending his night as he and Eddie Lack combined for a shutout over the New York Islanders. He would miss the next 21 games. After 22 games of not being on ice, Miller returned to start the last game of the regular season as the Canucks beat the Edmonton Oilers, 6–5.

=== Anaheim Ducks and retirement (2017–2021) ===
After concluding his three-year contract with the Canucks, Miller left as a free agent and signed a two-year, $4 million contract with the Anaheim Ducks on July 1, 2017. He began the 2017–18 season on the injured-reserve list due to a lingering wrist injury. In his return to health, Miller was able to make his debut with the Ducks in a 4–3 shootout victory over the Carolina Hurricanes on October 29, 2017. On February 17, 2019, Miller became the winningest American-born goaltender in NHL history, surpassing John Vanbiesbrouck.

On June 20, 2019, Miller was re-signed by the Ducks to return for a third season with the club, agreeing to a one-year $2.235 million contract extension. On December 23, 2020, Miller was re-signed to a one-year contract by the Ducks.

On April 29, 2021, Miller announced he would retire from the NHL at the end of the 2020–21 season. Miller played his final NHL game, a 4–3 overtime loss to the Minnesota Wild in which Victor Rask scored the game winning goal 2:46 into the overtime period on May 8, 2021. The Buffalo Sabres retired Miller's number 30 on January 19, 2023. On September 8, 2022, it was announced that Miller would be inducted into the United States Hockey Hall of Fame.

== International play ==
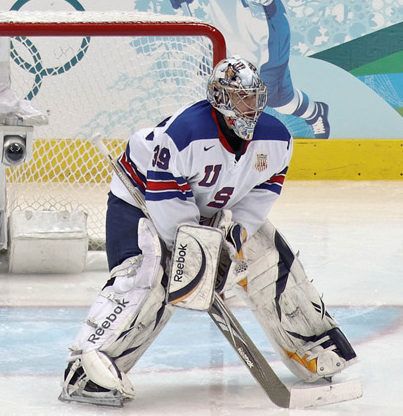
- Miller at the 2010 Winter Olympics

Medal record

Men's ice hockey

Representing the United States

Winter Olympics
Silver medal – second place	2010 Vancouver	

Miller was made a reserve for the United States at the 2006 Winter Olympics, but he did not play.

Miller was selected as starting goaltender for the United States in the 2010 Winter Olympics. He led the team to a perfect 5–0 start, including a 5–3 win over gold-medal favorite Canada in the preliminary round, stopping 42 of 45 shots. The five wins, including victories over Switzerland and Finland in the quarterfinals and semifinals, respectively, brought the United States to the gold medal game, where they faced Canada for the second time. In the gold medal game, they lost 3–2 in overtime despite Miller's 36 saves, as Sidney Crosby scored the game-winner in his second scoring attempt, after his first was saved by Miller. The United States, however, won the silver medal in large part due to Miller's 5–0–1 record, and Miller was named the most valuable player of the tournament. Miller finished with a save percentage of .946 and a GAA of 1.35, both American Olympic records. Miller also won International Ice Hockey Federation (IIHF) best goaltender honors and was named to the All-Star team.

After his selection to the United States roster for the 2014 Winter Olympics, head coach Dan Bylsma named Jonathan Quick the team's starting goaltender over Miller and fellow Olympic teammate Jimmy Howard. In his lone game during the tournament, Miller made 17 saves in a 5–1 win against Slovenia. The United States, however, did not medal, and Miller finished the tournament with a 1–0 record, a 1.00 GAA, and a .944 save percentage.

== Records ==
=== NHL ===
- Least saves required in a win: (Anaheim Jan. 25, 2018) 11:40 min: 0
- Most shootout wins by a goaltender in a season: 10

=== Buffalo Sabres ===
- Franchise leader in goaltender games (540)
- Franchise leader in goaltender minutes (31,661)
- Franchise leader in career wins (284)
- Franchise record for most wins in a season (41 in 2009–10)

=== USA Hockey Olympics ===
- Best career goals against average (1.30)
- Goaltender assists all-time (1)

=== Michigan State Spartans ===
- Goals against average all-time (1.54)
- Save percentage career (.941)
- Shutouts career (26)

== Personal life ==
Miller married actress Noureen DeWulf on September 3, 2011. On September 11, 2014, it was announced that the couple were expecting their first child. Their son was born in March 2015, in Vancouver, British Columbia. Their daughter was born in April 2022 in Los Angeles, California.

In 2006, Miller, along with his father Dean, started the Steadfast Foundation which supports cancer patients and their families. Miller began the foundation after his cousin was diagnosed with leukaemia.

== Career statistics ==
=== Regular season and playoffs ===
Bold indicates led league

			Regular season										Playoffs
Season	Team	League	GP	W	L	T	OT	MIN	GA	SO	GAA	SV%	GP	W	L	MIN	GA	SO	GAA	SV%
1997–98	Soo Indians	NAHL	37	21	14	0	—	2113	82	3	2.33	—	2	0	2	158	7	0	2.66	—
1998–99	Soo Indians	NAHL	47	31	14	1	—	2711	104	8	2.30	—	4	2	2	218	10	1	2.75	—
1999–00	Michigan State University	CCHA	25	16	5	3	—	1525	39	8	1.54	.932	—	—	—	—	—	—	—	—
2000–01	Michigan State University	CCHA	40	31	5	4	—	2448	54	10	1.33	.950	—	—	—	—	—	—	—	—
2001–02	Michigan State University	CCHA	40	26	9	5	—	2412	71	8	1.77	.936	—	—	—	—	—	—	—	—
2002–03	Rochester Americans	AHL	47	23	18	5	—	2815	10	2	2.34	.920	3	1	2	190	13	0	4.11	.856
2002–03	Buffalo Sabres	NHL	15	6	8	1	—	912	40	1	2.63	.902	—	—	—	—	—	—	—	—
2003–04	Buffalo Sabres	NHL	3	0	3	0	—	177	15	0	5.00	.795	—	—	—	—	—	—	—	—
2003–04	Rochester Americans	AHL	60	27	25	7	—	3579	132	5	2.21	.925	14	7	7	857	26	2	1.82	.934
2004–05	Rochester Americans	AHL	63	41	17	4	—	370	153	8	2.45	.922	9	5	4	547	24	0	2.63	.909
2005–06	Buffalo Sabres	NHL	48	30	14	—	3	2862	124	1	2.60	.914	18	11	7	1123	**48**	1	2.56	.908
2005–06	Rochester Americans	AHL	2	1	1	0	—	120	5	0	2.50	.889	—	—	—	—	—	—	—	—
2006–07	Buffalo Sabres	NHL	63	40	16	—	6	3692	168	2	2.73	.911	16	9	7	1029	38	0	2.22	.922
2007–08	Buffalo Sabres	NHL	76	36	27	—	**10**	4474	**197**	3	2.64	.906	—	—	—	—	—	—	—	—
2008–09	Buffalo Sabres	NHL	59	34	18	—	6	3443	145	5	2.53	.918	—	—	—	—	—	—	—	—
2009–10	Buffalo Sabres	NHL	69	41	18	—	8	4047	150	5	2.22	.929	6	2	4	384	15	0	2.34	.926
2010–11	Buffalo Sabres	NHL	66	34	22	—	8	3829	165	5	2.59	.916	7	3	4	410	20	2	2.93	.917
2011–12	Buffalo Sabres	NHL	61	31	21	—	7	3536	150	6	2.54	.916	—	—	—	—	—	—	—	—
2012–13	Buffalo Sabres	NHL	40	17	17	—	5	2302	108	0	2.81	.915	—	—	—	—	—	—	—	—
2013–14	Buffalo Sabres	NHL	40	**15**	22	—	3	2384	108	0	2.72	.923	—	—	—	—	—	—	—	—
2013–14	St. Louis Blues	NHL	19	**10**	8	—	1	1117	46	1	2.47	.903	6	2	4	422	19	0	2.70	.897
2014–15	Vancouver Canucks	NHL	45	29	15	—	1	2542	107	6	2.53	.911	3	1	1	156	6	0	2.31	.910
2015–16	Vancouver Canucks	NHL	51	17	24	—	6	3027	137	1	2.70	.916	—	—	—	—	—	—	—	—
2016–17	Vancouver Canucks	NHL	54	18	29	—	6	3212	150	3	2.80	.914	—	—	—	—	—	—	—	—
2017–18	Anaheim Ducks	NHL	28	12	6	—	6	1354	53	4	2.35	.928	1	0	0	20	3	0	9.00	.750
2018–19	Anaheim Ducks	NHL	20	11	7	—	2	1109	51	1	2.76	.912	—	—	—	—	—	—	—	—
2019–20	Anaheim Ducks	NHL	23	9	6	—	4	1239	64	0	3.10	.907	—	—	—	—	—	—	—	—
2020–21	Anaheim Ducks	NHL	16	4	8	—	2	871	51	1	3.51	.882	—	—	—	—	—	—	—	—
NHL totals			796	391	289	1	87	46,145	2,029	44	2.64	.914	57	28	27	3,544	149	3	2.52	.913

=== International ===
Year	Team	Event	Result	GP	W	L	T	MIN	GA	SO	GAA	SV%
2002	United States	WC	7th	4	2	2	0	238	7	1	1.76	.950
2003	United States	WC	13th	4	2	2	0	193	8	0	2.49	.889
2010	United States	OG	2nd place, silver medalist(s)	6	5	1	0	355	8	1	1.35	.946
2014	United States	OG	4th	1	1	0	0	60	1	0	1.00	.944
Senior totals				15	8	3	0	846	24	2	1.70	.938

== Awards and honors ==
Award	Year	Ref
College
All-CCHA Rookie Team	2000	
All-CCHA Second Team	2000	
CCHA All-Tournament Team	2000	
All-CCHA First Team	2001	
CCHA Player of the Year	2001	
AHCA West first-team All-American	2001	
Hobey Baker Memorial Award	2001	
C-Bone Classic champion	2001	
CCHA All-Tournament Team	2001	
All-CCHA First Team	2002	
CCHA Player of the Year	2002	
AHCA West first-team All-American	2002	
AHL
First All-Star team	2005	
Aldege "Baz" Bastien Memorial Award	2005	
NHL
All-Star Game	2007	
Foundation Player Award	2010	
Vezina Trophy	2010	
First All-Star team	2010	
International
Olympic MVP	2010	
Olympic best goaltender	2010	
Olympic All-Star team	2010	

Awards and achievements
Preceded by Mark Kosick	CCHA Most Valuable Player in Tournament; 2000, 2001	Succeeded by Michael Cammalleri
Preceded by Award created	CCHA Goaltender of the Year; 2000–01, 2001–02	Succeeded by Mike Betz
Preceded by Shawn Horcoff	CCHA Player of the Year; 2000–01, 2001–02	Succeeded by Chris Kunitz
Preceded by Mike Mottau	Winner of the Hobey Baker Award; 2000–01	Succeeded by Jordan Leopold
Preceded by Ron Dayne	Big Ten Jesse Owens Athlete of the Year; 2000–01	Succeeded by Jordan Leopold
Preceded by Tim Thomas	Winner of the Vezina Trophy; 2010	Succeeded by Tim Thomas
Preceded by Jason LaBarbera	Aldege "Baz" Bastien Memorial Award; 2004–05	Succeeded by Dany Sabourin
