= CCHA Player of the Year =

- Sport: Ice hockey
- Awarded for: The Player of the Year in the CCHA

History
- First award: 1977
- Most recent: Josh Kotai

The CCHA Player of the Year is an annual award given out at the conclusion of the Central Collegiate Hockey Association regular season to the best player in the conference as voted by the coaches of each CCHA team. The award went on hiatus after the original CCHA was disbanded after the 2012–13 season, and was reinstated when the league resumed play in 2021–22.

The Player of the Year was first awarded in 1977 and every year thereafter until 2013, when the original CCHA was dissolved as a consequence of the Big Ten Conference forming its men's ice hockey conference. The award returned along with the league in 2022.

Two players (Brendan Morrison and Ryan Miller) have received the award two separate times, both doing so in consecutive years.

== Award winners ==
| Year | Winner | Position | School |
|---|---|---|---|
| 1976–77 | Mike Liut | Goaltender | Bowling Green |
| 1977–78 | John Markell | Forward | Bowling Green |
| 1977–78 | Don Waddell | Defenceman | Northern Michigan |
| 1978–79 | Ken Morrow | Defenceman | Bowling Green |
| 1979–80 | Steve Weeks | Goaltender | Northern Michigan |
| 1980–81 | Jeff Pyle | Left Wing | Northern Michigan |
| 1981–82 | George McPhee | Forward | Bowling Green |
| 1982–83 | Brian Hills | Forward | Bowling Green |
| 1983–84 | Paul Pooley | Forward | Ohio State |
| 1984–85 | Ray Staszak | Forward | Illinois-Chicago |
| 1985–86 | Dan Dorion | Right Wing | Western Michigan |
| 1986–87 | Wayne Gagné | Defenceman | Western Michigan |
| 1987–88 | Mark Vermette | Right Wing | Lake Superior State |
| 1988–89 | Bruce Hoffort | Goaltender | Lake Superior State |
| 1989–90 | Kip Miller | Left Wing | Michigan State |
| 1990–91 | Jim Dowd | Center | Lake Superior State |
| 1991–92 | Dwayne Norris | Right Wing | Michigan State |
| 1992–93 | Brian Savage | Left Wing | Miami |
| 1993–94 | David Oliver | Right Wing | Michigan |
| 1994–95 | Brian Holzinger | Center | Bowling Green |
| 1995–96 | Brendan Morrison | Center | Michigan |

| Year | Winner | Position | School |
|---|---|---|---|
| 1996–97 | Brendan Morrison | Center | Michigan |
| 1997–98 | Chad Alban | Goaltender | Michigan State |
| 1998–99 | Mike York | Center | Michigan State |
| 1999–00 | Shawn Horcoff | Center | Michigan State |
| 2000–01 | Ryan Miller | Goaltender | Michigan State |
| 2001–02 | Ryan Miller | Goaltender | Michigan State |
| 2002–03 | Chris Kunitz | Left Wing | Ferris State |
| 2003–04 | Derek Edwardson | Center | Miami |
| 2004–05 | Tuomas Tarkki | Goaltender | Northern Michigan |
| 2005–06 | Scott Parse | Right Wing | Nebraska-Omaha |
| 2006–07 | David Brown | Goaltender | Notre Dame |
| 2007–08 | Kevin Porter | Center | Michigan |
| 2008–09 | Chad Johnson | Goaltender | Alaska |
| 2009–10 | Cody Reichard | Goaltender | Miami |
| 2010–11 | Andy Miele | Center | Miami |
| 2011–12 | Torey Krug | Defenceman | Michigan State |
| 2012–13 | Austin Czarnik | Center | Miami |
| 2021–22 | Dryden McKay | Goaltender | Minnesota State |
| 2022–23 | Blake Pietila | Goaltender | Michigan Tech |
| 2023–24 | Sam Morton | Forward | Minnesota State |
| 2024–25 | Alex Tracy | Goaltender | Minnesota State |
| 2025–26 | Josh Kotai | Goaltender | Augustana |

=== Winners by school ===
| School | Winners |
|---|---|
| Michigan State | 8 |
| Bowling Green | 6 |
| Miami | 5 |
| Michigan | 4 |
| Northern Michigan | 4 |
| Lake Superior State | 3 |
| Minnesota State | 3 |
| Western Michigan | 2 |
| Alaska | 1 |
| Augustana | 1 |
| Ferris State | 1 |
| Illinois-Chicago | 1 |
| Michigan Tech | 1 |
| Nebraska–Omaha | 1 |
| Notre Dame | 1 |
| Ohio State | 1 |

=== Winners by position ===
| Position | Winners |
|---|---|
| Center | 9 |
| Right Wing | 5 |
| Left Wing | 4 |
| Forward | 7 |
| Defenceman | 4 |
| Goaltender | 13 |

== See also ==
- CCHA Awards
