= Stu Burnie =

Canadian ice hockey player

- Born: May 7, 1962 (age 62); Orillia, Ontario, Canada
- Height: 6 ft 0 in (183 cm)
- Weight: 185 lb (84 kg; 13 st 3 lb)
- Position: Right wing
- Shot: Right
- Played for: Springfield Indians (1986–1989); Albany Choppers (1990-91); Fort Wayne Komets (1991)
- Playing career: 1986–1991

Stuart Burnie is a retired professional ice hockey player, most notably with the Springfield Indians of the American Hockey League.

== History ==
=== College career ===
Burnie played his college hockey with the Broncos of Western Michigan University. He received All-Academic honorable mention citations in 1985 and 1986. His collegiate career culminated with the team's first appearance in the NCAA hockey playoffs, in 1986; Burnie broke the school record for goals in a season and for a single game that season, as well as being named to the CCHA All-Tournament and Second Team All-Star teams. He finished his college career as the Broncos' second all-time goal scorer (behind teammate and future NHLer Dan Dorion) and seventh all-time point getter.

=== Professional career ===
Undrafted by any NHL team, Burnie signed a three-year minor league contract with the New York Islanders to play for their Springfield Indians farm team, and played the 1986, 1988 and 1989 seasons in Springfield. Although the team did not meet with success, Burnie was the second leading scorer for the team over those three seasons, behind minor league scoring legend Bruce Boudreau.

The 1990 season saw Burnie signing with JoKP Joensuu of the Finnish SM-liiga. His tenure was not successful - he finished 14th in team scoring - and Burnie signed the following season with the Albany Choppers of the International Hockey League. One of the more mismanaged teams in recent hockey history, the Choppers folded in February 1991. Burnie signed for the remainder of the season with the Fort Wayne Komets, after which he retired from professional hockey.

=== International play ===
Burnie played in two stints for the Canadian National Team, in 1986 and 1991, scoring a total of four goals and three assists in seven games.

== Awards and honours ==
Award	Year
All-CCHA Second Team	1985-86
