= Jim Culhane =

Canadian retired ice hockey defenceman

Biographical details
- Born: March 13, 1965 (age 61); Haileybury, Ontario

Playing career
- 1983–1987: Western Michigan
- 1987–1989: Binghamton Whalers
- 1989–1990: Hartford Whalers
- 1990–1991: Capital District Islanders
- 1990–1991: Kansas City Blades
- 1991–1992: Capital District Islanders
- Position: Defenceman

Coaching career (HC unless noted)
- 1999–2010: Western Michigan

Head coaching record
- Overall: 158–222–48 (.425)

Jim Culhane (born March 13, 1965) is a Canadian retired ice hockey defenceman. He played for the Hartford Whalers. Culhane coached the Western Michigan Broncos men's ice hockey team from 1999 to 2010.

== Career ==
Culhane played at Western Michigan during one of the most successful periods in program history. After graduating in 1987 he embarked on a short professional career, before retiring in 1992. In 1993 he returned to his alma mater and served as an assistant under Bill Wilkinson until the latter was fired in the midst of an investigation into the program after two players were arrested at a team party.

For a brief time Culhane was able to right the ship in Kalamazoo but once Wilkinson's last recruiting class left the team sunk towards the bottom of the conference and never had a winning record under Culhane's stewardship again. Over the course of his 11 full seasons Culhane could only get the Broncos out of the CCHA first round only twice and lost all four quarterfinal games his team played in. Western Michigan announced that they were firing Culhane in February 2010 but allowed the coach to finish out the season.

== Career statistics ==
			Regular season					Playoffs
Season	Team	League	GP	G	A	Pts	PIM	GP	G	A	Pts	PIM
1983–84	Western Michigan Broncos	CCHA	42	1	14	15	88	—	—	—	—	—
1984–85	Western Michigan Broncos	CCHA	37	2	8	10	84	—	—	—	—	—
1985–86	Western Michigan Broncos	CCHA	40	1	21	22	61	—	—	—	—	—
1986–87	Western Michigan Broncos	CCHA	43	9	24	33	163	—	—	—	—	—
1987–88	Binghamton Whalers	AHL	76	5	17	22	169	4	0	0	0	8
1988–89	Binghamton Whalers	AHL	72	6	11	17	200	—	—	—	—	—
1989–90	Binghamton Whalers	AHL	73	6	11	17	69	—	—	—	—	—
1989–90	Hartford Whalers	NHL	6	0	1	1	6	—	—	—	—	—
1990–91	Capital District Islanders	AHL	15	0	0	0	14	—	—	—	—	—
1990–91	Kansas City Blades	IHL	59	1	8	9	50	—	—	—	—	—
1991–92	Capital District Islanders	AHL	37	1	3	4	58	—	—	—	—	—
NHL totals			6	0	1	1	6	—	—	—	—	—

== Head coaching record ==
Record table
Season	Team	Overall	Conference	Standing	Postseason
Western Michigan Broncos (CCHA) (1999–2010)
1998–99	Western Michigan	3–4–2†	3–4–2†	10th†	
1999–00	Western Michigan	12–21–3	10–15–3	T–9th	CCHA First Round
2000–01	Western Michigan	20–13–6	12–10–6	T–5th	CCHA First Round
2001–02	Western Michigan	19–15–4	13–12–3	6th	CCHA First Round
2002–03	Western Michigan	15–21–2	13–14–1	T–8th	CCHA First Round
2003–04	Western Michigan	17–18–4	12–13–3	8th	CCHA First Round
2004–05	Western Michigan	14–21–2	8–18–2	T–10th	CCHA First Round
2005–06	Western Michigan	10–24–6	7–16–5	11th	CCHA Quarterfinals
2006–07	Western Michigan	18–18–1	14–13–1	6th	CCHA First Round
2007–08	Western Michigan	8–27–3	4–22–2	12th	CCHA First Round
2008–09	Western Michigan	14–20–7	9–13–6–2	T–7th	CCHA Quarterfinals
2009–10	Western Michigan	8–20–8	4–17–7–2	12th	CCHA First Round
Western Michigan:		158–222–48	109–167–32		
Total:		158–222–48			
National champion Postseason invitational champion Conference regular season champion Conference regular season and conference tournament champion Division regular season champion Division regular season and conference tournament champion Conference tournament champion

† Culhane replaced Bill Wilkinson in February 1999
