= Western Michigan Broncos men's ice hockey =

American college ice hockey team

- Current season
- University: Western Michigan University
- Conference: NCHC
- First season: 1973; 53 years ago
- Head coach: Pat Ferschweiler; 5th season, 104–50–4 (.671)
- Assistant coaches: Jason Herter; J. J. Crew; Jared Brown; Will Massey
- Arena: Lawson Arena; Kalamazoo, Michigan
- Student section: Lawson Lunatics
- Colors: Brown and gold

NCAA tournament champions
- 2025

NCAA tournament Frozen Four
- 2025

NCAA tournament appearances
- 1986, 1994, 1996, 2011, 2012, 2017, 2022, 2023, 2024, 2025, 2026

Conference tournament champions
- CCHA: 1986, 2012; NCHC: 2025

Conference regular season champions
- NCHC: 2025

Current uniform

The Western Michigan Broncos men's ice hockey team is a National Collegiate Athletic Association (NCAA) Division I college ice hockey program that represents Western Michigan University. The Broncos are a member of the National Collegiate Hockey Conference (NCHC). They play at Lawson Arena in Kalamazoo, Michigan, United States. Western Michigan won their first national championship in 2025.

== History ==
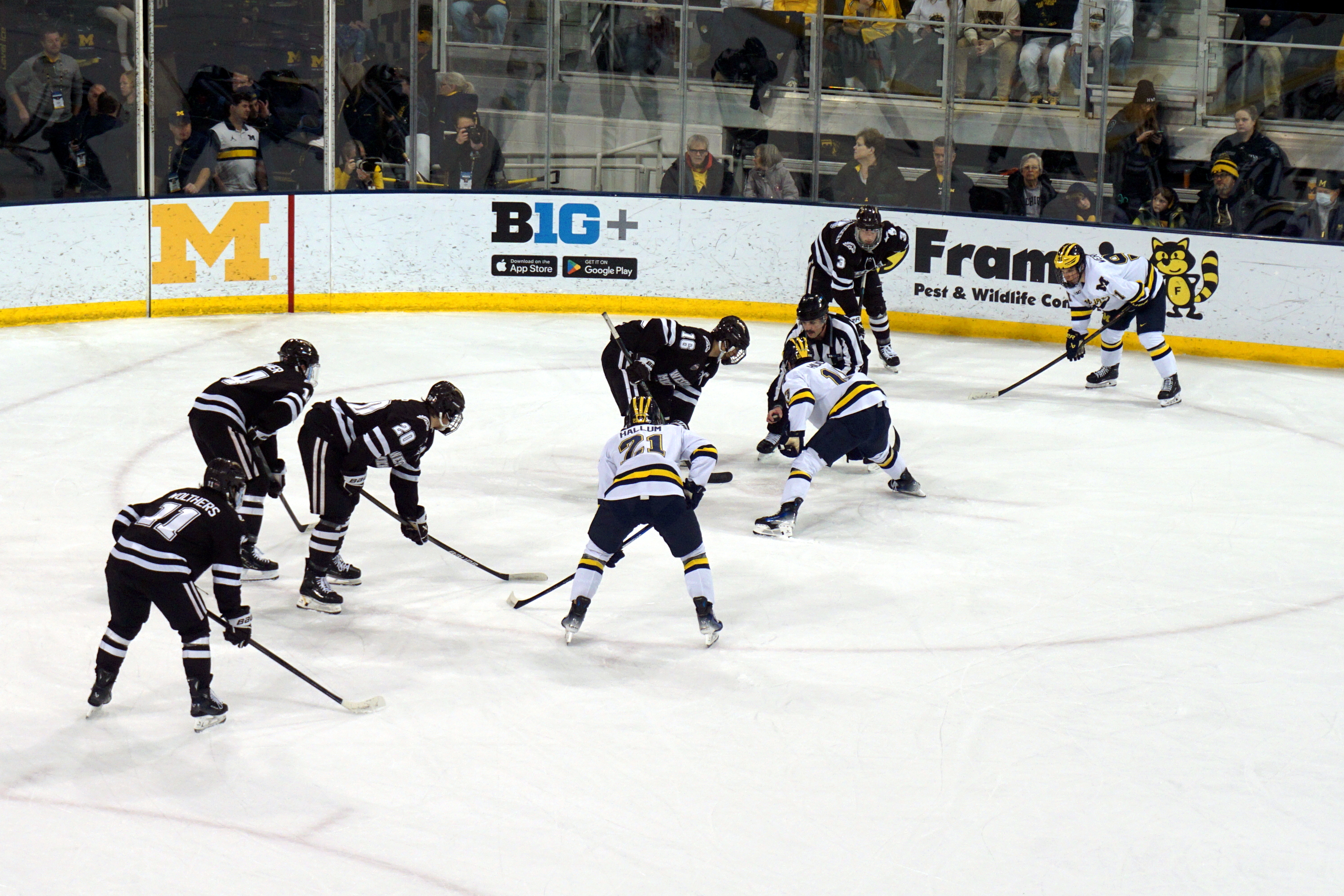
2024 Western Michigan Broncos playing at Michigan

The Broncos program began in 1973 and joined the Central Collegiate Hockey Association (CCHA) for the 1975–76 season. After ten seasons in the league Western Michigan won the 1986 CCHA Playoff Tournament and advanced to the school's first NCAA Division I men's ice hockey tournament in 1986. The 1986 season marked the program's first CCHA Tournament Championship and the program's first bid to the NCAA Tournament. The Broncos entered the tournament in the West Regional against Harvard and lost the two-game aggregate series, being outscored 11–4 by the Crimson.

Western Michigan's next post season appearance came in 1994. Western Michigan received an at-large bid to the 1994 NCAA Division I Tournament and again fell in the first round with a 6–3 loss to Wisconsin. The Broncos rebounded in the 1995–96 season after a sub-.500 season in 1994–95. Western Michigan received the program's second at-large bid to the NCAA Tournament. Western Michigan lost again in the first round to Clarkson 6–1.

Under first-year coach Jeff Blashill, Western Michigan received an at-large bid to the 2011 NCAA Division I Men's Ice Hockey Tournament, where they would lose their opening game 3–2 in double overtime to Denver. Denver scored two goals in the last 4:29 of the third period to force overtime. In 2011–12, for the second consecutive season, Western Michigan had a new head coach and reached the NCAA tournament. Longtime National Hockey League (NHL) coach Andy Murray was named as coach of the Broncos after Blashill left for the Detroit Red Wings. WMU finished tied for second in the CCHA and won the CCHA tournament, thereby receiving an automatic bid into the NCAA tournament. Western Michigan lost in the first round of the tournament 3–1 to No. 1 seed North Dakota.

The CCHA disbanded after the 2012–13 season, in part due to the addition of men's ice hockey to the Big Ten Conference. This led the Broncos to join the National Collegiate Hockey Conference (NCHC) starting in the 2013–14 season

Western Michigan won the 2013 four-team Great Lakes Invitational which was played outdoors at Comerica Park in Detroit. The Broncos defeated No. 3 Michigan 3–2 in overtime in the semifinals, and then claimed the championship by beating Michigan Tech 1–0, also in overtime. WMU won the 2014 Shillelagh Tournament with an 8–2 victory over No. 17 Union. The Broncos also defeated Ohio State in the first round of the tournament, 6–2.

In 2016–17, the Broncos followed up a disappointing 8–25–3 season with an impressive 22–13–5 and a third-place finish in the NCHC. Western Michigan was invited to the final Great Lakes Invitational at Joe Louis Arena, where they defeated Michigan Tech in the championship. WMU has been invited to the GLI 5 times dating back to 1977, winning it 3 of those times. The Broncos were defeated in the first round of the 2017 NCAA Division I tournament by Air Force.

In the 2021–22 season, Western Michigan had a legendary 26-win season under first-year head coach Pat Ferschweiler. The Broncos shared the 2021 Great Lakes Invitational championship by defeating Michigan State. The Broncos advanced to their first NCHC championship game, losing to Minnesota-Duluth 0–3. Western Michigan clinched their first 1-seed in the NCAA Tournament and would claim the first playoff win in program history by defeating Northeastern. They would be defeated by Minnesota 3–0 in the regional final.

The Broncos’ 2024–25 season was their best season to date. The Broncos collected numerous wins against top 10 ranked opponents and remained ranked in the top 5 for the majority of the season. On February 28, 2025, WMU defeated North Dakota 6–4 to claim their first NCHC regular season championship. After being down 3–0 in the NCHC Tournament Championship, WMU would score four unanswered goals to defeat Denver 4–3 in double overtime. This would the Broncos’ first ever NCHC Tournament Championship and third overall conference championship. WMU earned the 1-seed in the Fargo Regional for the NCAA Tournament, where they defeated Minnesota State and UMass to advance to St. Louis, where they would play in their first Frozen Four in school history. In a rematch of the NCHC Tournament Championship, the Broncos defeated Denver in a 2OT thriller to advance to their first championship game. In the championship game, they defeated Boston University by a score of 6–2 to claim their first national championship.

== Season-by-season results ==
Source:

== Coaching ==
=== All-time coaching records ===
As of the completion of 2024–25 season

Tenure	Coach	Years	Record	Pct.
1973–1978	Bill Neal	5	91–65–5	.581
1978–1982	Glen Weller	4	64–73–5	.468
1982–1999	Bill Wilkinson	17^{†}	313–301–53	.509
1999–2010	Jim Culhane	11^{†}	158–222–48	.425
2010–2011	Jeff Blashill	1	19–13–10	.571
2011–2021	Andy Murray	10	167–156–43	.515
2021–Present	Pat Ferschweiler	4	104–50–4	.671
Totals	7 coaches	52 seasons	916–880–168	.509

† The 1998–99 season was coached by both Wilkinson and Culhane.

== Statistical leaders ==
=== Career points leaders ===
Player	Years	GP	G	A	Pts	PIM
Dan Dorion	1982–1986	157	115	178	293	
Paul Polillo	1986–1990	165	82	189	271	
Wayne Gagné	1983–1987	162	42	199	241	
Jeff Green	1986–1990	159	109	125	234	
Ross Fitzpatrick	1978–1982	138	100	125	225	
Tim Dunlop	1974–1978	129	92	106	198	
Rob Bryden	1983–1987	162	104	91	195	
Chris Brooks	1992–1996	147	57	127	184	
Troy Thrun	1983–1986	122	81	102	183	
Bob Scurfield	1978–1981	130	82	95	177	

=== Career goaltending leaders ===
GP = Games played; Min = Minutes played; W = Wins; L = Losses; T = Ties; GA = Goals against; SO = Shutouts; SV% = Save percentage; GAA = Goals against average

Minimum 30 games played

Player	Years	GP	Min	W	L	T	GA	SO	SV%	GAA
Frank Slubowski	2011–2015	94	6021	49	38	15	235	7	.909	2.34
Cameron Rowe	2022–2025	93	5515	58	32	2	220	6	.908	2.39
Marc Magliarditi	1995–1996	36	2110	23	11	2	91	5	.910	2.59
Brandon Bussi	2019–2022	77	4467	46	25	5	194	4	.912	2.61
Jerry Kuhn	2007–2011	63	3528	16	27	3	158	2	.912	2.69

Statistics current through the end of the 2024–2025 season.

== Current roster ==
As of March 25, 2026.

No.	Nat.	Player	Class	Pos	Height	Weight	DoB	Hometown	Previous team	NHL rights
1	(United States)	Kirk Laursen	Graduate	G	6' 3" (1.91 m)	185 lb (84 kg)	2000-01-02	Bloomfield Hills, Michigan	Miami (NCHC)	—
2	(United States)	Grady Gallatin	Sophomore	D	6' 3" (1.91 m)	179 lb (81 kg)	2004-06-07	White Bear Lake, Minnesota	Janesville Jets (NAHL)	—
3	(United States)	Cole Crusberg-Roseen	Junior	D	5' 11" (1.8 m)	184 lb (83 kg)	2002-04-14	Stratham, New Hampshire	Lincoln Stars (USHL)	—
4	(Canada)	Zaccharya Wisdom	Junior	F	6' 0" (1.83 m)	175 lb (79 kg)	2004-04-21	Toronto, Ontario	Colorado College (NCHC)	SEA, 212th overall 2023
6	(Sweden)	Theo Wallberg	Junior	D	6' 5" (1.96 m)	203 lb (92 kg)	2003-12-04	Stockholm, Sweden	Ohio State (Big Ten)	OTT, 168th overall 2022
8	(United States)	Zach Nehring	Sophomore	F	6' 3" (1.91 m)	179 lb (81 kg)	2005-03-07	Minot, North Dakota	Sioux Falls Stampede (USHL)	WPG, 82nd overall 2023
9	(United States)	Zach Bade	Sophomore	F	6' 2" (1.88 m)	183 lb (83 kg)	2003-04-26	Rosemount, Minnesota	Tri-City Storm (USHL)	—
10	(United States)	Zack Sharp	Sophomore	D	6' 1" (1.85 m)	181 lb (82 kg)	2005-03-29	Naperville, Illinois	Cedar Rapids RoughRiders (USHL)	SJS, 124th overall 2025
11	(Canada)	Tyler MacKenzie	Freshman	F	5' 10" (1.78 m)	185 lb (84 kg)	2004-06-06	Red Deer, Alberta	Everett Silvertips (WHL)	—
12	(Canada)	Sam Huck	Freshman	F	5' 9" (1.75 m)	150 lb (68 kg)	2004-08-31	Calgary, Alberta	Waterloo Black Hawks (USHL)	—
13	(United States)	Grant Slukynsky	Junior	F	6' 1" (1.85 m)	205 lb (93 kg)	2002-03-12	Edina, Minnesota	Northern Michigan (CCHA)	—
14	(United States)	Colby Woogk	Freshman	D	6' 1" (1.85 m)	203 lb (92 kg)	2004-07-10	Fort Worth, Texas	Tri-City Storm (USHL)	—
15	(United States)	Alex Calbeck	Freshman	D	6' 1" (1.85 m)	185 lb (84 kg)	2006-06-20	St. Charles, Illinois	Chicago Steel (USHL)	—
17	(United States)	Ty Henricks	Sophomore	F	6' 4" (1.93 m)	216 lb (98 kg)	2005-06-28	Mission Viejo, California	Muskegon Lumberjacks (USHL)	NYR, 183rd overall 2023
18	(United States)	William Whitelaw	Junior	F	5' 9" (1.75 m)	175 lb (79 kg)	2005-02-05	Rosemount, Minnesota	Michigan (Big Ten)	CBJ, 66th overall 2023
19	(United States)	Bobby Cowan	Freshman	F	5' 11" (1.8 m)	181 lb (82 kg)	2006-06-12	Edina, Minnesota	Madison Capitols (USHL)	—
21	(United States)	Ryan Kusler	Sophomore	F	6' 0" (1.83 m)	187 lb (85 kg)	2003-05-19	Battle Creek, Michigan	Omaha Lancers (USHL)	—
22	(Finland)	Iiro Hakkarainen	Sophomore	F	5' 11" (1.8 m)	172 lb (78 kg)	2004-03-09	Helsinki, Finland	Fargo Force (USHL)	—
23	(Sweden)	Liam Valente	Senior	F	5' 11" (1.8 m)	183 lb (83 kg)	2003-05-23	Märsta, Sweden	Providence (HEA)	—
24	(United States)	Garrett Szydlowski	Junior	F	5' 10" (1.78 m)	185 lb (84 kg)	2002-06-12	Detroit, Michigan	Wenatchee Wild (BCHL)	—
25	(United States)	Cole Spicer	Junior	F	5' 11" (1.8 m)	185 lb (84 kg)	2004-06-13	Grand Forks, North Dakota	Dubuque Fighting Saints (USHL)	BOS, 117th overall 2022
26	(United States)	Jamison Sluys	Freshman	F	5' 10" (1.78 m)	194 lb (88 kg)	2005-09-03	Point Roberts, Washington	Youngstown Phantoms (USHL)	—
27	(Finland)	Joona Väisänen	Sophomore	D	6' 0" (1.83 m)	176 lb (80 kg)	2004-07-29	Espoo, Finland	Dubuque Fighting Saints (USHL)	PIT, 175th overall 2024
28	(United States)	Ryan Humphrey	Sophomore	F	5' 11" (1.8 m)	165 lb (75 kg)	2003-04-08	Northville, Michigan	Green Bay Gamblers (USHL)	—
30	(United States)	Hampton Slukynsky	Sophomore	G	6' 1" (1.85 m)	190 lb (86 kg)	2005-07-02	Warroad, Minnesota	Fargo Force (USHL)	LAK, 118th overall 2023
33	(Sweden)	Samuel Sjölund	Senior	D	6' 1" (1.85 m)	175 lb (79 kg)	2001-05-19	Stockholm, Sweden	Dubuque Fighting Saints (USHL)	DAL, 111th overall 2019
34	(United States)	Owen Michaels	Junior	F	6' 0" (1.83 m)	185 lb (84 kg)	2002-05-01	Detroit, Michigan	Dubuque Fighting Saints (USHL)	—
35	(United States)	Gavin Moffatt	Freshman	G	6' 0" (1.83 m)	183 lb (83 kg)	2004-04-16	Darien, Connecticut	Green Bay Gamblers (USHL)	—
37	(United States)	Zach Bookman	Senior	D	5' 10" (1.78 m)	175 lb (79 kg)	2002-03-29	Syracuse, New York	Merrimack (HEA)	—

== Awards and honors ==
=== NCAA ===
==== Individual awards ====
Spencer Penrose Award

- Pat Ferschweiler: 2025

Tournament Most Outstanding Player

- Owen Michaels; 2025

=== All-Americans ===
AHCA First Team All-Americans

- 1985–86: Wayne Gagné, D; Dan Dorion, F
- 1986–87: Wayne Gagné, F
- 2019–20: Hugh McGing, F
- 2020–21: Ronnie Attard, D
- 2021–22: Ronnie Attard, D
- 2024–25: Alex Bump, F

AHCA Second Team All-Americans

- 1983–84: Dan Dorion, F
- 1985–86: Bill Horn, G
- 1995–96: Marc Magliarditi, G
- 2000–01: Mike Bishai, F
- 2011–12: Danny DeKeyser, D
- 2012–13: Danny DeKeyser, D
- 2021–22: Ethen Frank, F
- 2022–23: Jason Polin, F

=== CCHA ===
==== Individual awards ====
Player of the Year

- Dan Dorion: 1986
- Wayne Gagné: 1987

Best Defensive Forward

- Pat Ferschweiler: 1992
- Dane Walters: 2013

Best Defensive Defenseman

- Brent Brekke: 1994
- Danny DeKeyser: 2012, 2013

Rookie of the Year

- Chris Brooks: 1993
- Marc Magliarditi: 1996
- Daryl Andrews: 1997
- Patrick Dwyer: 2002
- Mark Letestu: 2007

Coach of the Year

- Bill Wilkinson: 1984, 1986, 1996

Ilitch Humanitarian Award

- Brett Beebe: 2013

Most Valuable Player in Tournament

- Bill Horn: 1986
- Frank Slubowski: 2012

==== All-Conference teams ====
First Team All-CCHA

- 1976–77: Tim Dunlop, F
- 1980–81: Ross Fitzpatrick, F
- 1983–84: Dan Dorion, F
- 1985–86: Wayne Gagné, D; Dan Dorion, F
- 1986–87: Wayne Gagné, D
- 1987–88: Paul Polillo, F
- 1991–92: Keith Jones, G
- 1995–96: Marc Magliarditi, G
- 2012–13: Danny DeKeyser, D

Second Team All-CCHA

- 1977–78: Bernie Saunders, F; Paul Cappuccio, F
- 1979–80: Bob Scurfield, F
- 1985–86: Chris MacDonald, F; Stu Burnie, F
- 1986–87: Bill Horn, G; Rob Bryden, F
- 1987–88: Mike Posma, D; Ron Hoover, F
- 1990–91: Mike Eastwood, F
- 1995–96: Jeremy Brown, F
- 1996–97: Joe Corvo, D
- 1999–00: David Gove, F
- 2000–01: Mike Bishai, F; David Gove, F
- 2004–05: Brent Walton, F
- 2008–09: Patrick Galivan, F
- 2011–12: Danny DeKeyser, D; Matt Tennyson, D
- 2012–13: Frank Slubowski, G; Luke Witkowski, D

CCHA All-Rookie Team

- 1991–92: Chris Belanger, D
- 1992–93: Scott Chartier, D; Chris Brooks, F
- 1994–95: Steve Duke, D
- 1995–96: Marc Magliarditi, G; Joe Corvo, D
- 1996–97: Daryl Andrews, D
- 2001–02: Patrick Dwyer, F
- 2002–03: Vince Bellissimo, F
- 2006–07: Mark Letestu, F
- 2010–11: Danny DeKeyser, D; Chase Balisy, F
- 2011–12: Frank Slubowski, G; Garrett Haar, D
- 2012–13: Kenney Morrison, D

=== NCHC ===
==== Individual awards ====
Player of the Year

- Jason Polin: 2023

Forward of the Year

- Jason Polin: 2023
- Alex Bump: 2025

Offensive Defenseman of the Year

- Ronnie Attard: 2021, 2022

Defensive Forward of the Year

- Tim Washe: 2025

Scholar-Athlete of the Year

- Kale Bennett: 2021
- Drew Worrad: 2022
- Luke Grainger: 2024

Herb Brooks Coach of the Year

- Andy Murray: 2017
- Pat Ferschweiler: 2023, 2025

Frozen Faceoff MVP

- Alex Bump: 2025

==== All-Conference teams ====
First Team All-NCHC

- 2019–20: Hugh McGing, F
- 2020–21: Ronnie Attard, D
- 2021–22: Ronnie Attard, D; Ethen Frank, F
- 2022–23: Jason Polin, F
- 2024–25: Alex Bump, F

Second Team All-NCHC

- 2013–14: Chase Balisy, F
- 2016–17: Sheldon Dries, F
- 2018–19: Hugh McGing, F
- 2019–20: Ronnie Attard, D
- 2021–22: Drew Worrad, F
- 2023–24: Luke Grainger, F
- 2024–25: Hampton Slukynsky, G
- 2025–26: Hampton Slukynsky, G

Third Team All-NCHC

- 2024–25: Cameron Rowe, G; Joona Väisänen, D
- 2025–26: Grant Slukynsky, F; Samuel Sjolund, D

NCHC All-Rookie Team

- 2016–17: Ben Blacker, G
- 2019–20: Ronnie Attard, D
- 2022–23: Ryan McAllister, F
- 2023–24: Alex Bump, F
- 2024–25: Hampton Slukynsky, G; Joona Väisänen, D

== Western Michigan Broncos Hall of Fame ==
The following is a list of people associated with the Western Michigan men's ice hockey program who were elected into the Western Michigan University Athletic Hall of Fame.

- Dan Dorion (1998)
- Ross Fitzpatrick (2004)
- Wayne Gagné (2001)
- Rob Hodge (2008)
- Harry Lawson (1990)
- Jamal Mayers (2014)
- Bernie Saunders (1994)
- Neil Smith (1991)
- Danny Dekeyser (2024)

== Olympians ==
This is a list of Western Michigan alumni were a part of an Olympic team.

Name	Position	Western Michigan Tenure	Team	Year	Finish
Frederik Tiffels	Left Wing	2014–2017	(Germany) GER	2022, 2026	10th, 6th

== Broncos in the NHL ==
As of June 15, 2026.

= NHL All-Star team	= NHL All-Star	= NHL All-Star and NHL All-Star team	= Hall of Famers

Player	Position	Team(s)	Years	Games	Stanley Cups
Wade Allison	Right Wing	PHI	2020–2023	75	0
Bill Armstrong	Left Wing	PHI	1990–1991	1	0
Ronnie Attard	Defenseman	PHI	2021–2024	29	0
Chase Balisy	Center	FLA	2017–2018	8	0
Mike Bishai	Center	EDM	2003–2004	14	0
Alex Bump	Left Wing	PHI	2025–Present	17	0
Brandon Bussi	Goaltender	CAR	2025–Present	39	1
Sam Colangelo	Center	ANA	2023–Present	44	0
Kevin Connauton	Defenseman	DAL, CBJ, ARI, COL, FLA, PHI	2013–2022	360	0
Joe Corvo	Defenseman	LAK, OTT, CAR, WSH, BOS	2002–2014	708	0
Paul Cotter	Center	VGK, NJD	2021–Present	296	1
Jim Culhane	Defenseman	HFD	1989–1990	6	0
Danny DeKeyser	Defenseman	DET	2013–2022	547	0
Dan Dorion	Left Wing	NJD	1985–1988	4	0
Sheldon Dries	Center	COL, VAN, DET	2018–Present	127	0
Patrick Dwyer	Right Wing	CAR	2008–2015	416	0
Mike Eastwood	Center	TOR, WPG, PHO, NYR, STL, CHI, PIT	1991–2004	783	0
Ross Fitzpatrick	Center	PHI	1982–1986	20	0
Scott Foster ^{‡}	Goaltender	CHI	2017–2018	1	0
Ethen Frank	Center	WSH	2024–Present	86	0

Player	Position	Team(s)	Years	Games	Stanley Cups
David Gove	Center	CAR	2005–2007	2	0
Glenn Healy	Goaltender	LAK, NYI, NYR, TOR	1985–2001	437	1
Ron Hoover	Left Wing	BOS, STL	1989–1992	18	0
Glenn Johannesen	Left Wing	NYI	1985–1986	2	0
Keith Jones	Right Wing	WSH, COL, PHI	1992–2001	491	0
Mark Letestu	Center	PIT, CBJ, EDM, WIN	2009–2020	567	0
Jamal Mayers	Right Wing	STL, TOR, CGY, SJS, CHI	1996–2013	915	1
Hugh McGing	Left Wing	STL	2022–Present	9	0
Griffen Molino	Forward	VAN	2016–2017	5	0
Jordan Oesterle	Center	EDM, CHI, ARI, DET, CGY, BOS, NSH	2014–Present	409	0
Jason Polin	Right Wing	COL	2023–Present	13	0
Andy Rymsha	Right Wing	QUE	1991–1992	6	0
Mattias Samuelsson	Defenseman	BUF	2020–Present	290	0
Max Sasson	Center	VAN	2024–Present	95	0
Bernie Saunders	Right Wing	QUE	1979–1981	10	0
Corey Schueneman	Defenseman	MTL, STL	2021–2025	35	0
Paul Szczechura	Center	TBL, BUF	2008–2012	92	0
Matt Tennyson	Defenseman	SJS, CAR, BUF, NJD, NSH	2013–2022	173	0
Tim Washe	Center	ANA	2024–Present	41	0
Luke Witkowski	Right Wing	TBL, DET	2014–2022	132	0

‡Scott Foster played 14 minutes for the Blackhawks after being signed to a 1-day contract as an emergency backup due to injury.

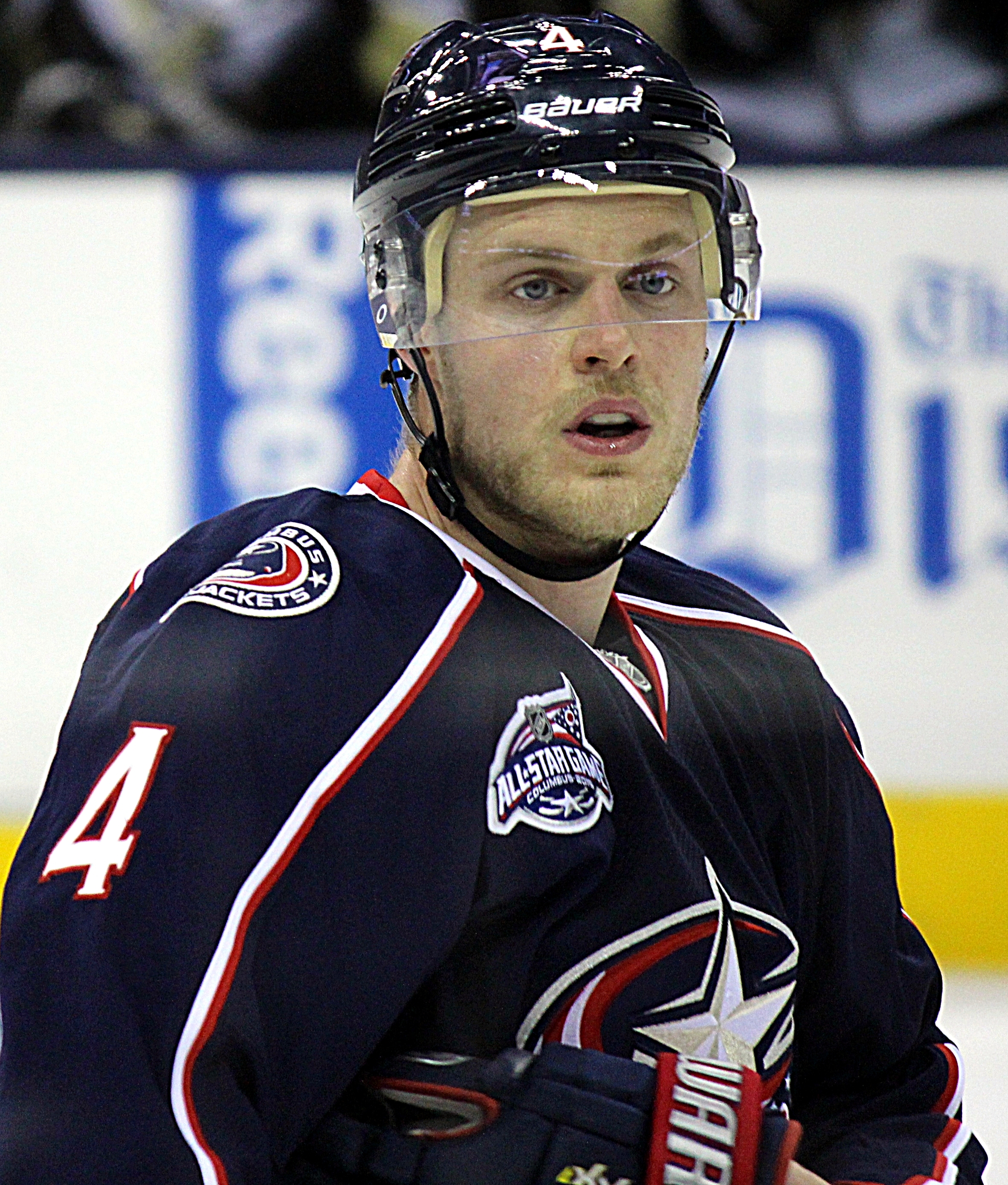
Kevin Connauton

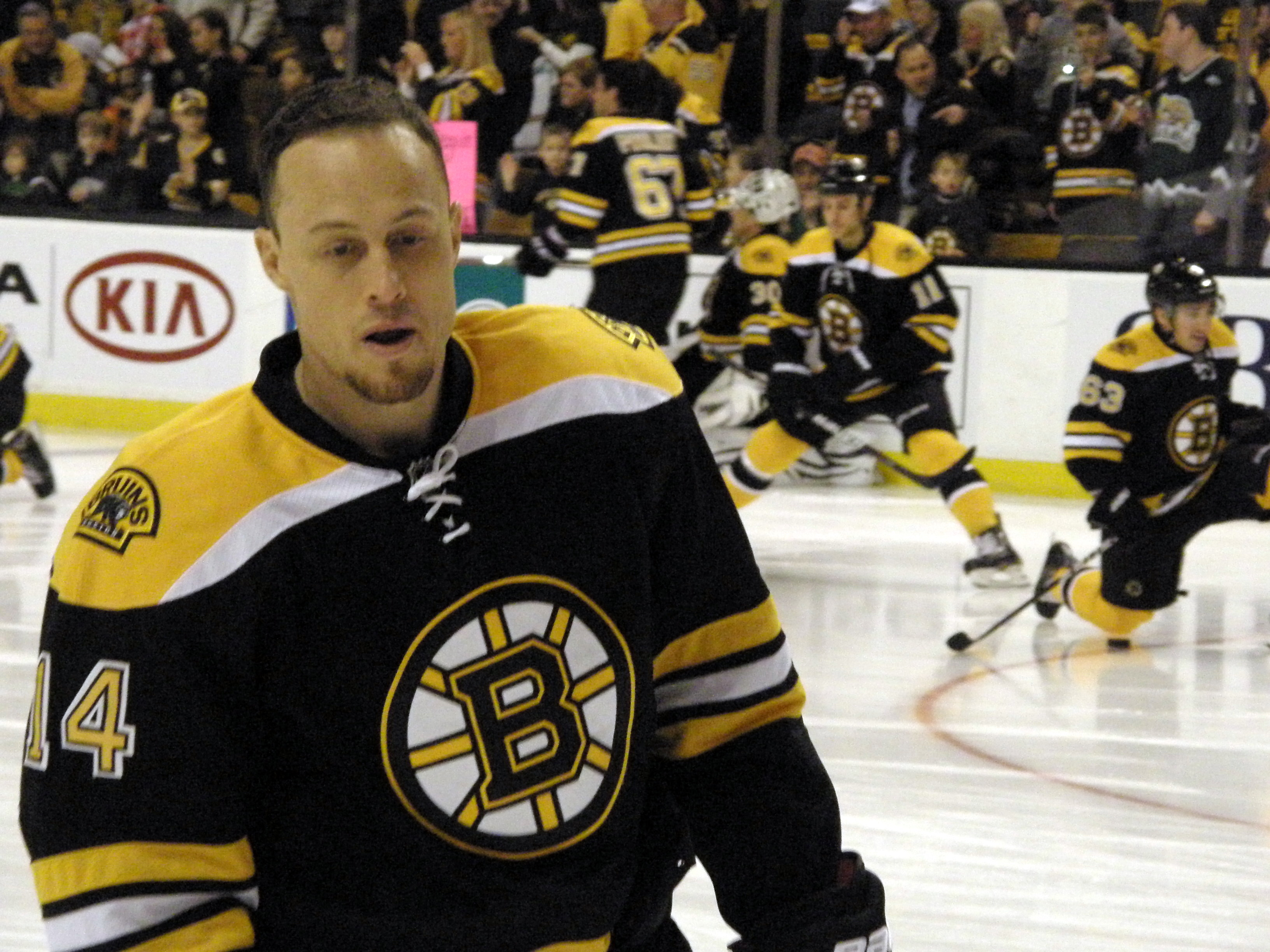
Joe Corvo

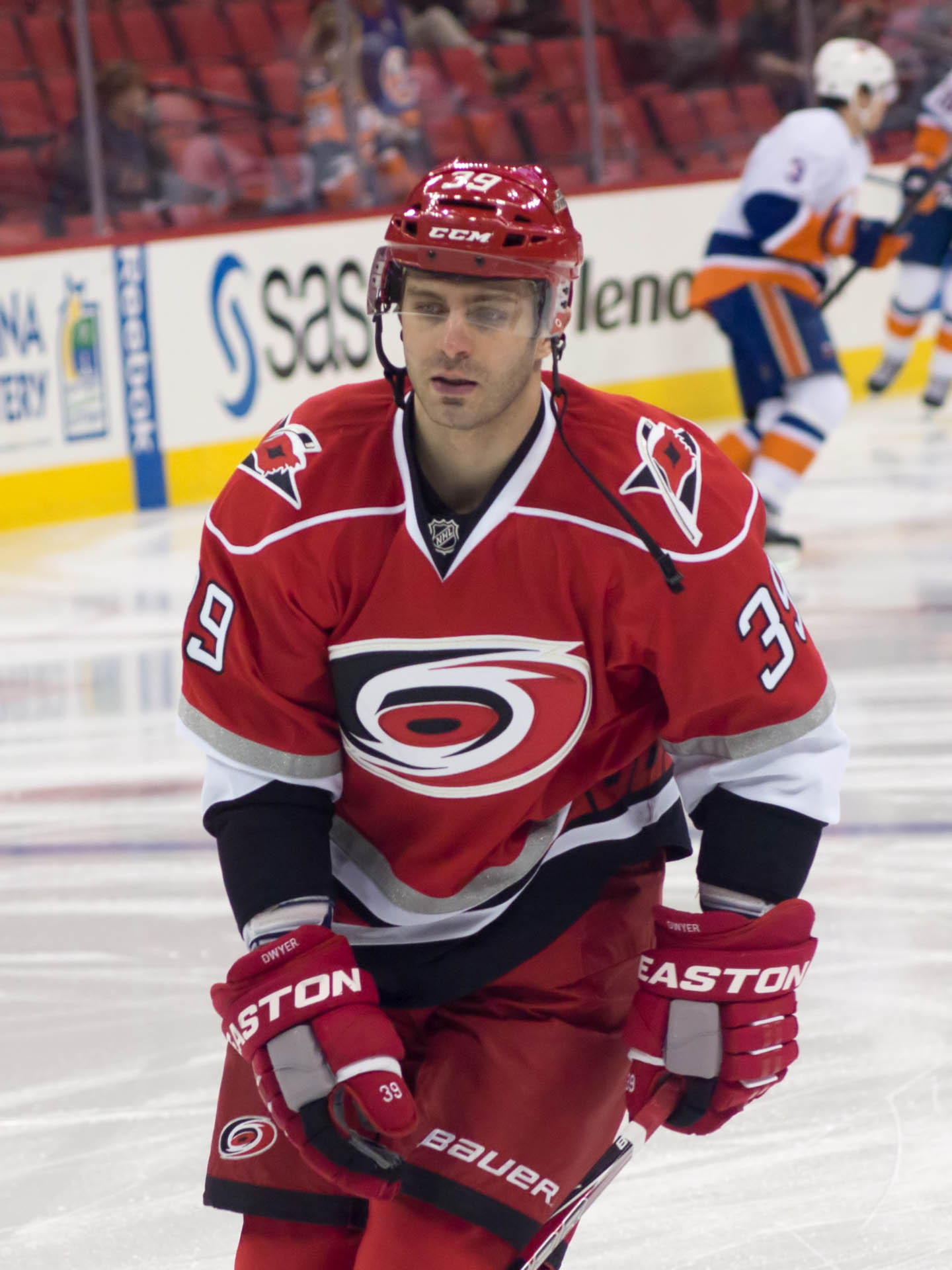
Patrick Dwyer

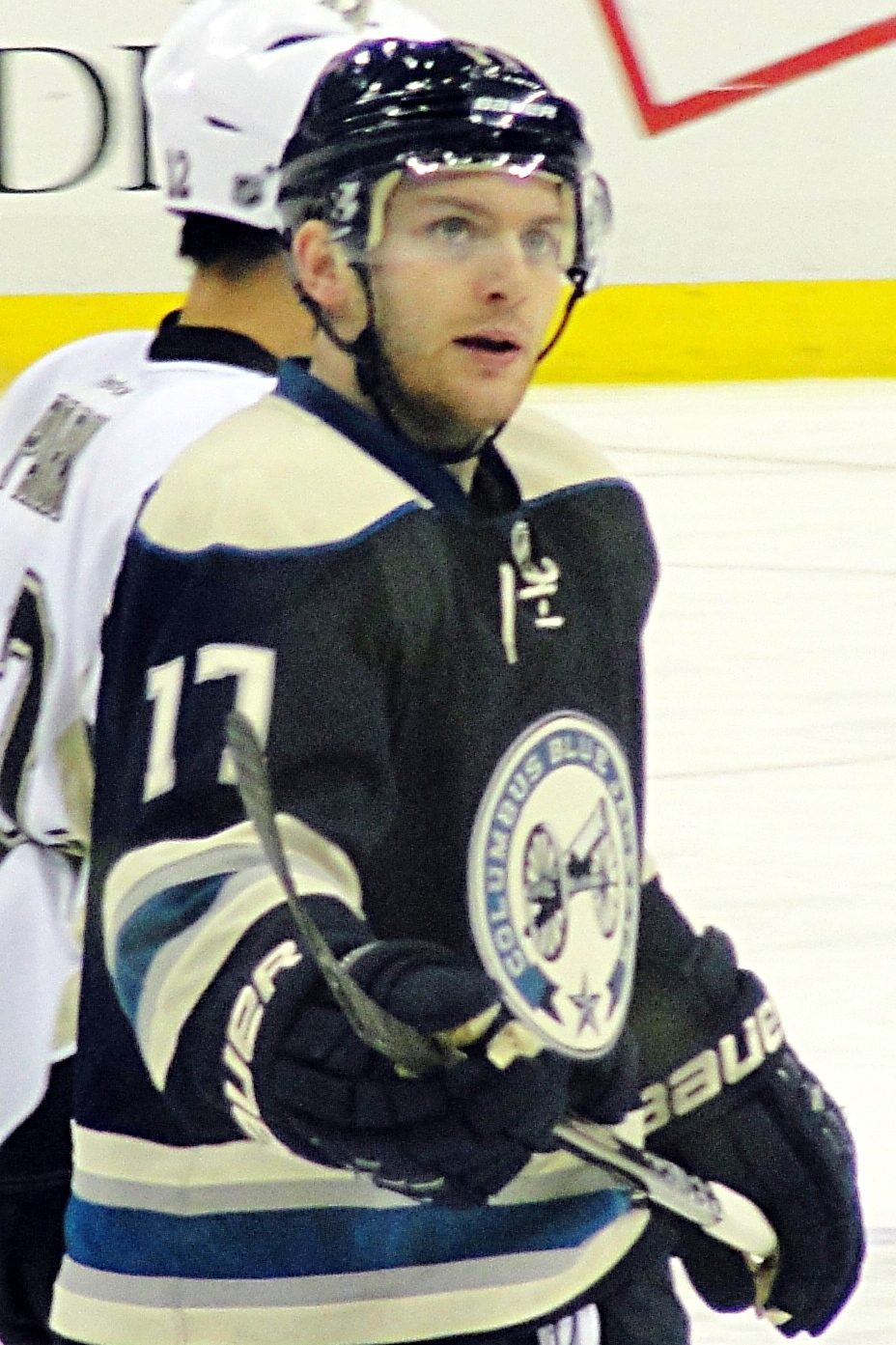
Mark Letestu

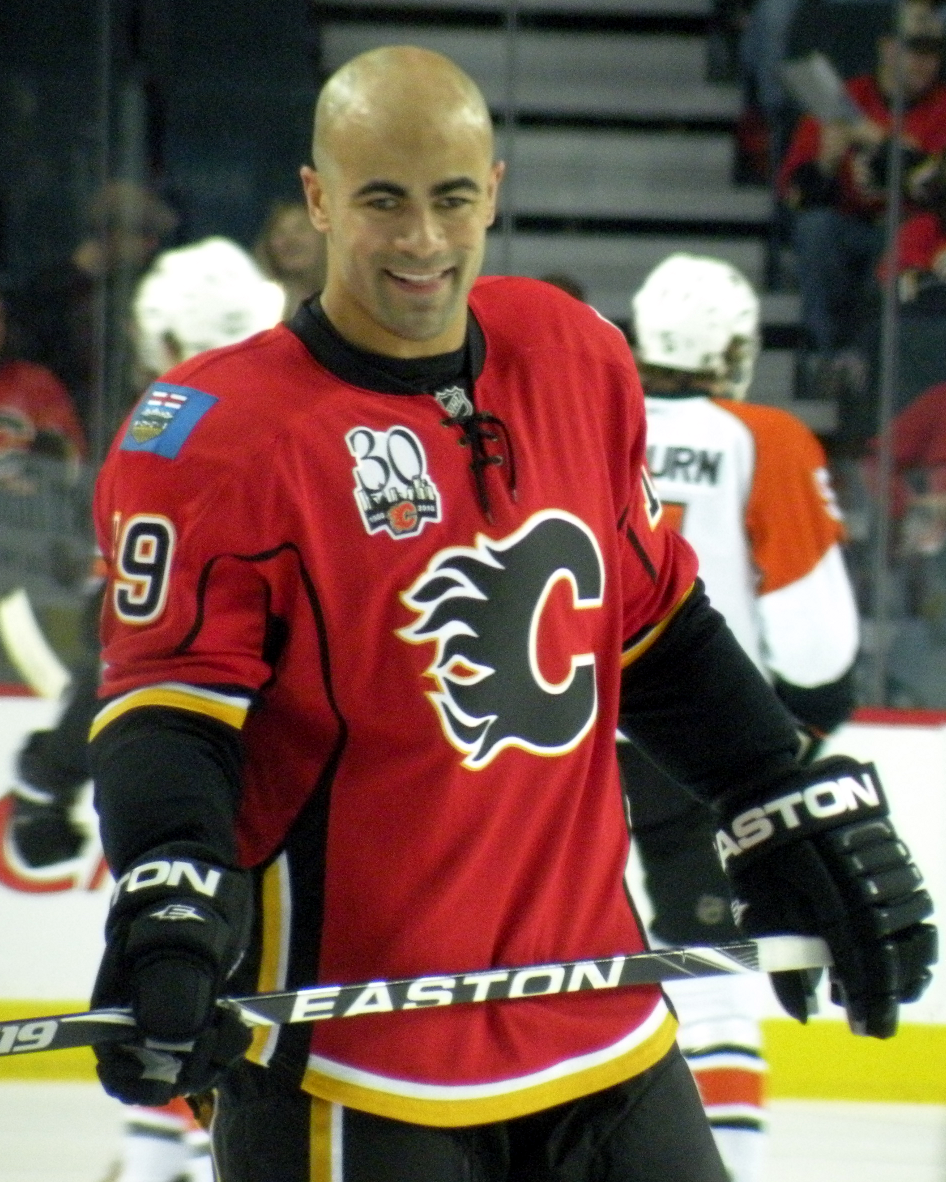
Jamal Mayers

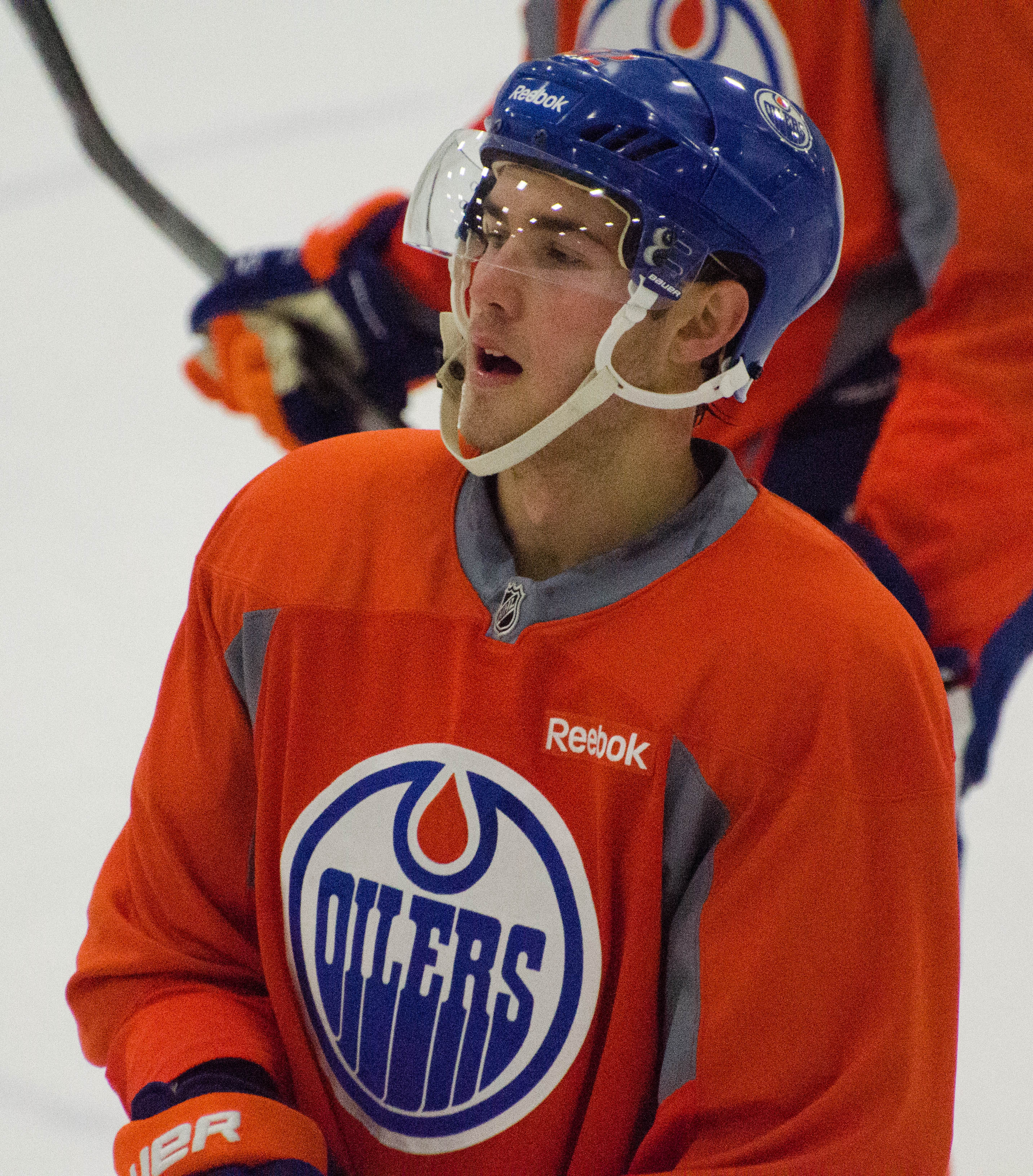
Jordan Oesterle

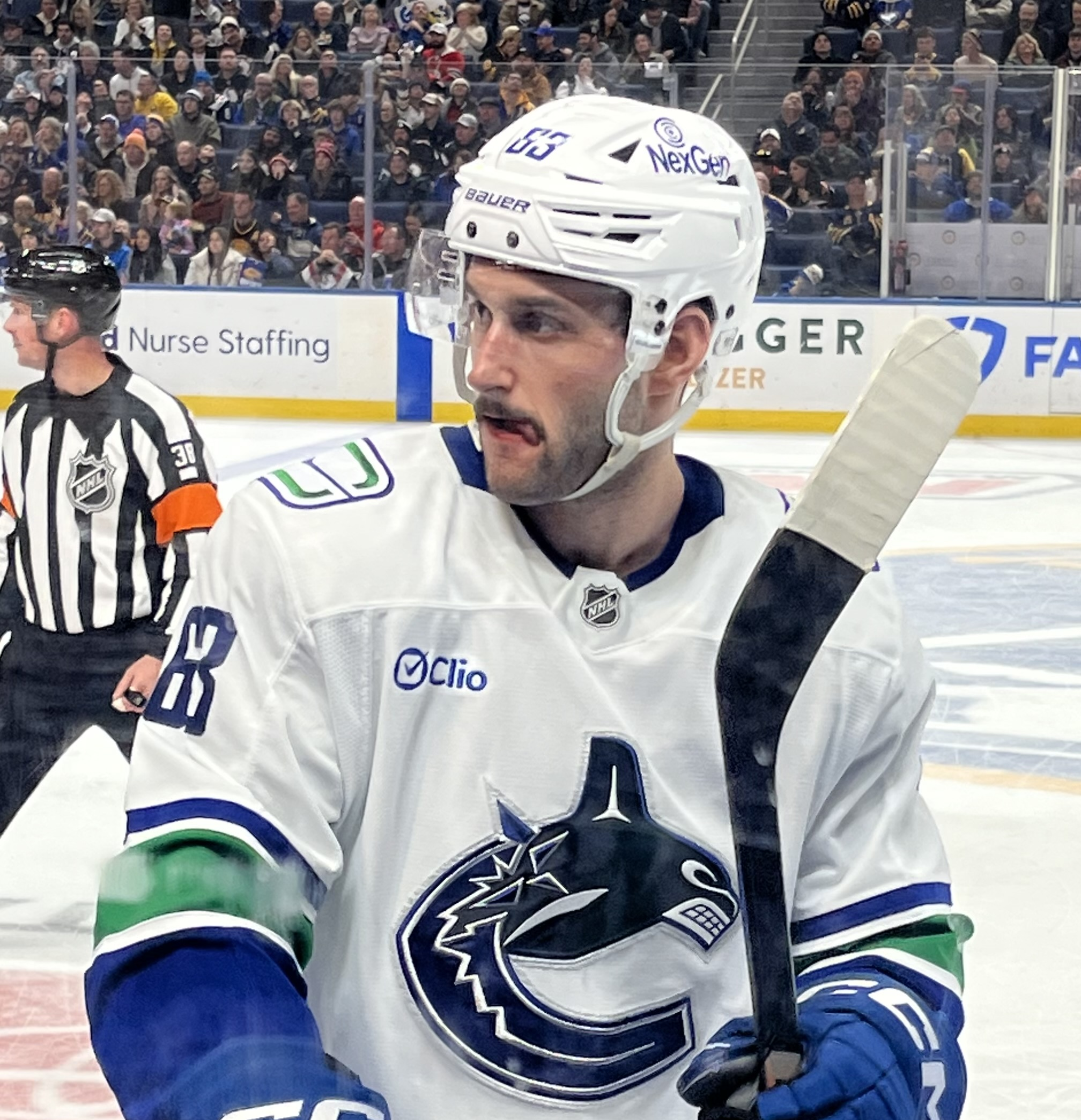
Max Sasson

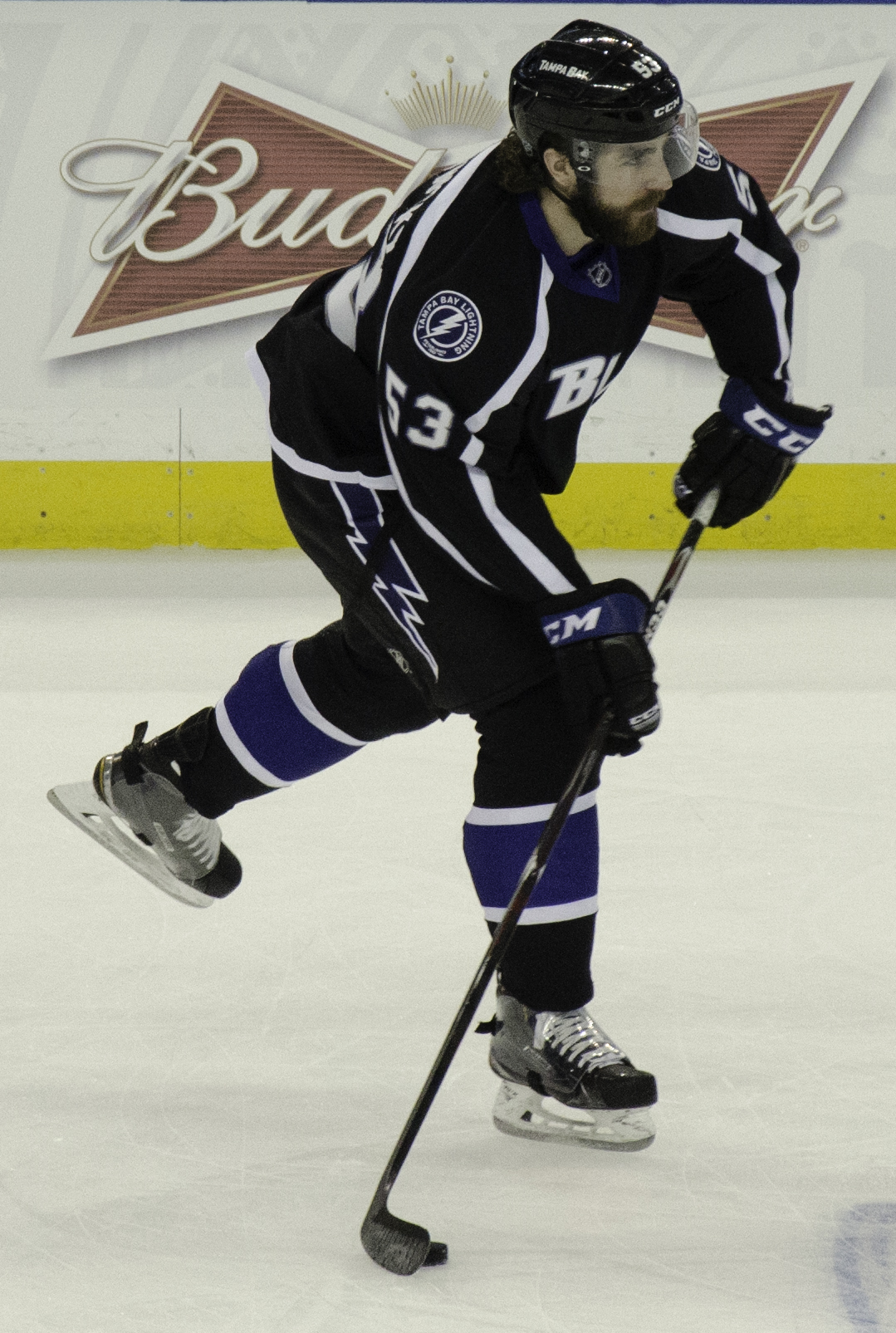
Luke Witkowski

== See also ==
- Western Michigan Broncos
