= Wayne Gagné =

Canadian ice hockey player

- Born: June 27, 1964 (age 62) Toronto, Ontario, Canada
- Height: 5 ft 8 in (173 cm)
- Weight: 173 lb (78 kg; 12 st 5 lb)
- Position: Defence
- Shot: Right
- Played for: Sherbrooke Canadiens; Baltimore Skipjacks; Peoria Rivermen; Kalamazoo Wings
- NHL draft: 1987 NHL Supplemental Draft; Montreal Canadiens
- Playing career: 1983–1994

Wayne Gagné (born June 27, 1964) is a Canadian former professional ice hockey player.

== Career ==
Wayne Gagné began his college career at Western Michigan in 1983 in Bill Wilkinson's second recruiting class. The small defenseman was an instant hit for the Broncos, scoring 43 points in 41 games in his freshman season. After declining slightly in his sophomore year he exploded for 76 points as a junior, leading all defensemen in scoring and becoming the first AHCA First Team All-American for Western Michigan (with Dan Dorion). Gagné was instrumental in helping WMU win their first CCHA Tournament, being named to the All-Tournament Team, as well as their first NCAA Tournament appearance.

Gagné performed even better in his senior season, finishing the year with the NCAA record for assists (76) for any position and points (89) for a defenseman in a season. Additionally, he also finished with the most career assists (199) and second most points for a defenseman (241) behind only Ron Wilson (Records current as of 2019). Gagné was named as the CCHA Player of the Year and was Runner-Up for the Hobey Baker Award.

After graduating Gagné played briefly for the Canadian National Team before beginning his professional career. He was drafted by the Montreal Canadiens in the 1987 NHL Supplemental Draft. He played at the top level of minor league hockey in North America for two seasons, putting up good numbers, but his small stature was an impediment for NHL teams who mostly employed large players as defensemen. With the NHL an unlikely possibility, Gagné headed to Europe in 1989, playing two seasons with SC Lyss. He finished second in team scoring both seasons, helping the team to stave off relegation twice.

Gagné spent the final three seasons of his career playing for five teams in five countries, ending as the leading scorer for Hellerup IK in 1994.

== Honors ==
Gagné was inducted into the Western Michigan Athletic Hall of Fame in 2001 and was named to the CCHA All-Time First Team in 2013.

== Career statistics ==
			Regular season					Playoffs
Season	Team	League	GP	G	A	Pts	PIM	GP	G	A	Pts	PIM
1983–84	Western Michigan Broncos	NCAA	41	8	35	43	32	—	—	—	—	—
1984–85	Western Michigan Broncos	NCAA	33	4	29	33	46	—	—	—	—	—
1985–86	Western Michigan Broncos	NCAA	43	17	59	76	37	—	—	—	—	—
1986–87	Western Michigan Broncos	NCAA	43	13	76	89	38	—	—	—	—	—
1986–87	Team Canada	International	3	0	1	1	6	—	—	—	—	—
1987–88	Sherbrooke Canadiens	AHL	14	0	4	4	8	—	—	—	—	—
1987–88	Baltimore Skipjacks	AHL	58	8	31	39	30	—	—	—	—	—
1987–88	Peoria Rivermen	IHL	7	1	2	3	8	7	1	4	5	15
1988–89	Peoria Rivermen	IHL	64	8	41	49	58	4	1	2	3	6
1989–90	SC Lyss	NLB	33	18	28	46	64	—	—	—	—	—
1990–91	SC Lyss	NLB	34	21	29	50	36	—	—	—	—	—
1991–92	HC Sierre	NLB	19	9	11	20	18	—	—	—	—	—
1991–92	Kalamazoo Wings	IHL	3	0	4	4	2	—	—	—	—	—
1991–92	Brantford Smoke	CoHL	12	5	8	13	21	—	—	—	—	—
1992–93	Gunco Panda's Rotterdam	Netherlands	7	5	2	7	4	—	—	—	—	—
1992–93	Brantford Smoke	CoHL	21	1	12	13	6	12	2	10	12	2
1993–94	Hellerup IK	Denmark	26	13	25	38	58	—	—	—	—	—
NCAA totals			160	42	199	241	153	—	—	—	—	—
NLB totals			86	48	68	116	118	—	—	—	—	—

== Awards and honors ==
Award	Year
All-CCHA First Team	1985–86
AHCA East First Team All-American	1985–86
CCHA All-Tournament Team	1986
All-CCHA First Team	1986–87
AHCA East First Team All-American	1986–87

Awards and achievements
Preceded by Dan Dorion	CCHA Player of the Year; 1986–87	Succeeded by Mark Vermette
