= Ross Fitzpatrick (ice hockey) =

Canadian ice hockey player

- Born: October 7, 1960 (age 65) Penticton, British Columbia, Canada
- Height: 6 ft 0 in (183 cm)
- Weight: 195 lb (88 kg; 13 st 13 lb)
- Position: Centre
- Shot: Left
- Played for: Philadelphia Flyers
- NHL draft: 147th overall, 1980; Philadelphia Flyers
- Playing career: 1982–1992

Ross Fitzpatrick (born October 7, 1960) is a Canadian former professional ice hockey centre who played 20 games over parts of four seasons in the National Hockey League (NHL) for the Philadelphia Flyers. He is currently a pro scout with the Flyers.

== Career statistics ==
| | | | Regular season | | | | | Playoffs |
| Season | Team | League | GP | G | A | Pts | PIM | GP | G | A | Pts | PIM |
|---|---|---|---|---|---|---|---|---|---|---|---|---|
| 1977–78 | Penticton Vees | BCJHL | 66 | 68 | 64 | 132 | 76 | — | — | — | — | — |
| 1978–79 | Western Michigan University | NCAA | 35 | 16 | 21 | 37 | 31 | — | — | — | — | — |
| 1979–80 | Western Michigan University | NCAA | 34 | 26 | 33 | 59 | 22 | — | — | — | — | — |
| 1980–81 | Western Michigan University | NCAA | 36 | 28 | 43 | 71 | 22 | — | — | — | — | — |
| 1981–82 | Western Michigan University | NCAA | 33 | 30 | 28 | 58 | 34 | — | — | — | — | — |
| 1982–83 | Maine Mariners | AHL | 66 | 29 | 28 | 57 | 32 | 15 | 5 | 1 | 6 | 12 |
| 1982–83 | Philadelphia Flyers | NHL | 1 | 0 | 0 | 0 | 0 | — | — | — | — | — |
| 1983–84 | Springfield Indians | AHL | 45 | 33 | 30 | 63 | 28 | 4 | 3 | 2 | 5 | 2 |
| 1983–84 | Philadelphia Flyers | NHL | 12 | 4 | 2 | 6 | 0 | — | — | — | — | — |
| 1984–85 | Hershey Bears | AHL | 35 | 26 | 15 | 41 | 8 | — | — | — | — | — |
| 1984–85 | Philadelphia Flyers | NHL | 5 | 1 | 0 | 1 | 0 | — | — | — | — | — |
| 1985–86 | Hershey Bears | AHL | 77 | 50 | 47 | 97 | 28 | 17 | 9 | 7 | 16 | 10 |
| 1985–86 | Philadelphia Flyers | NHL | 2 | 0 | 0 | 0 | 0 | — | — | — | — | — |
| 1986–87 | Hershey Bears | AHL | 66 | 45 | 40 | 85 | 34 | 5 | 1 | 4 | 5 | 10 |
| 1987–88 | Hershey Bears | AHL | 35 | 14 | 17 | 31 | 12 | 12 | 11 | 4 | 15 | 8 |
| 1988–89 | Wiener EV | Austria | 38 | 26 | 23 | 49 | — | — | — | — | — | — |
| 1988–89 | Hershey Bears | AHL | 11 | 6 | 9 | 15 | 4 | 9 | 2 | 2 | 4 | 4 |
| 1989–90 | Hershey Bears | AHL | 74 | 45 | 58 | 103 | 26 | — | — | — | — | — |
| 1990–91 | Binghamton Rangers | AHL | 69 | 26 | 29 | 55 | 26 | 10 | 3 | 1 | 4 | 4 |
| 1991–92 | Binghamton Rangers | AHL | 76 | 34 | 38 | 72 | 32 | 10 | 1 | 3 | 4 | 2 |
| NHL totals | | | 20 | 5 | 2 | 7 | 0 | — | — | — | — | — |
| AHL totals | | | 554 | 308 | 311 | 619 | 230 | 82 | 35 | 24 | 59 | 52 |

== Awards and honours ==
| Award | Year |
|---|---|
| All-CCHA First Team | 1980-81 |
| AHL Second All-Star Team | 1985-86 |
| AHL Second All-Star Team | 1989-90 |
