= John U. Bacon =

American journalist and author

- Occupation: Author; sports journalist
- Education: University of Michigan (B.A., M.A.)
- Subject: Sports; business
- Spouse: Christie Breitner (2014–present)
- Children: 1

John U. Bacon is an American sports journalist and author.

== Education ==
After graduating from Huron High School, Bacon earned a bachelor's degree in history and a master's degree in education from the University of Michigan.

== Career ==
Bacon's first journalism job was as a lifestyle and sports reporter for The Ann Arbor News. In 1995, Bacon became a sports feature writer for The Detroit News.

In 1998, Bacon traveled to Nagano, Japan, to cover the 1998 Winter Olympics for The Detroit News. After the Olympics, Bacon left The Detroit News to become a freelance writer. He has written articles for The New York Times, Time, The Wall Street Journal, and ESPN The Magazine.

In 2000, Bacon started his radio career with a sports show on WAAM in Ann Arbor. In 2002, he started a radio show, Off the Field, on WTKA. In 2007, Bacon began providing weekly sports commentary on Michigan public television stations.

In 2005, Bacon was awarded a Knight-Wallace Fellowship for journalism from the University of Michigan.

== Books ==
Bacon is the author of numerous books on sports, business, health, and history, including:

- Blue Ice: The Story of Michigan Hockey. University of Michigan Press, 2001.
- America's Corner Store: Walgreens' Prescription For Success. John Wiley & Sons, 2004. Hoboken, N.J. ISBN 0471675083
- Cirque du Soleil, The Spark: Igniting the Creative Fire that Lives Within Us All. Doubleday, 2006. About Cirque du Soleil.
- Bo's Lasting Lessons, The Legendary Coach Teaches the Timeless Fundamentals of Leadership, with former Michigan football coach Bo Schembechler. Hachette, 2007. The book includes chapters on Woody Hayes, Dave Brandon, Jim Hackett and Brad Bates.
- Three and Out: Rich Rodriguez and the Michigan Wolverines in the Crucible of College Football. Farrar, Straus & Giroux, 2011. Some of the players Bacon followed include Brandon Graham, Denard Robinson and Michael Martin, and strength coach Mike Barwis.
- Fourth and Long: The Fight for the Soul of College Football. Simon & Schuster, 2013. Explores college football, and the Big Ten, particularly the Ohio State University, University of Michigan, Michigan State University, University of Notre Dame and Pennsylvania State University football programs. Penn State's Bill O'Brien, Michael Mauti and Michael Zordich are some of the heroes of the story
- Endzone: The Rise, Fall, and Return of Michigan Football. St. Martin’s Press, 2015. Covers Dave Brandon's tenure as athletic director and Jim Harbaugh's arrival.
- Playing Hurt: My Journey from Despair to Hope. Da Capo Press, 2017. Written as a memoir with John Saunders and published after Saunders' death.
- The Great Halifax Explosion: A World War I Story of Treachery, Tragedy, and Extraordinary Heroism. HarperCollins, 2017.
- The Best of Bacon: Select Cuts. University of Michigan Press, 2018.
- Overtime: Jim Harbaugh and the Michigan Wolverines at the Crossroads of College Football. HarperCollins, 2019.
- Let Them Lead: Unexpected Lessons in Leadership from America's Worst High School Hockey Team. Houghton Mifflin Harcourt, 2021. ISBN 0358533260
- The Greatest Comeback: How Team Canada Fought Back, Took the Summit Series, and Reinvented Hockey. HarperCollins Canada, 2022.
- The Gales of November: The Untold Story of the Edmund Fitzgerald. Liveright 2025. ISBN 978-1-324-09464-7

Three and Out, Fourth and Long and Endzone have been New York Times bestsellers.

== Media appearances ==
Bacon provides weekly sports commentary for Michigan Radio and appears often on NPR, ESPN and the Big Ten Network, among other networks. In 2015, his radio essay won first prize in the Public Radio News Directors Incorporated (PRNDI) awards. Bacon has been a guest on NPR's quiz shows Wait Wait...Don't Tell Me! and Ask Me Another.

Bacon gives speeches for corporations and other organizations, including three TEDx talks, another to receive the Golden Apple Award, and the Knight-Wallace Fellows Program's Hovey Lecture.

== Academia ==
Bacon teaches at the Medill School of Journalism at Northwestern University and at the University of Michigan. In 2009, Michigan students awarded him the Golden Apple Award for excellence in teaching. In 2019, Bacon taught a class on Teaching and Coaching at the University of Michigan School of Education.

Bacon coached the hockey team of his alma mater, Huron High School, from 2000 to 2004. He led the team from its worst to its best record in school history in three years. In 2007, Bacon was inducted into the River Rat Hall of Fame.

In 2019, Bacon was appointed by Gov. Rick Snyder to the Michigan Technological University Board of Trustees.

== Personal life ==
Bacon is married to the former Christie Breitner, and they have one son.
