= Dan Dorion =

American ice hockey player (born 1963)

- Born: March 2, 1963 (age 62); Astoria, New York, U.S.
- Height: 5 ft 9 in (175 cm)
- Weight: 180 lb (82 kg; 12 st 12 lb)
- Position: Centre
- Shot: Right
- Played for: New Jersey Devils; HC Fassa; Nottingham Panthers; Humberside Seahawks; Humberside Hawks
- National team: United States
- NHL draft: 232nd overall, 1982; New Jersey Devils
- Playing career: 1986–1995

Daniel Norman Dorion (born March 2, 1963) is an American former professional ice hockey right winger who played four games with the New Jersey Devils of the National Hockey League (NHL) between 1985–86 and 1987–88. The rest of his career, which lasted from 1986 to 1995, was mainly spent in the minor American Hockey League and in Europe. Internationally Dorion played for the American national team at the 1985 World Championship.

Dorion played college hockey for Western Michigan University. In 1986 he placed second in voting for the Hobey Baker Award, when he led the NCAA in scoring. Dorion was the 1986 CCHA player of the year.

== Career statistics ==
=== Regular season and playoffs ===
			Regular season					Playoffs
Season	Team	League	GP	G	A	Pts	PIM	GP	G	A	Pts	PIM
1980–81	New Hyde Park Arrows	NYJHL	40	41	41	82	—	—	—	—	—	—
1981–82	Austin Mavericks	USHL	50	53	44	97	20	—	—	—	—	—
1982–83	Western Michigan University	CCHA	34	11	20	31	23	—	—	—	—	—
1983–84	Western Michigan University	CCHA	42	41	50	91	42	—	—	—	—	—
1984–85	Western Michigan University	CCHA	39	21	46	67	28	—	—	—	—	—
1985–86	Western Michigan University	CCHA	42	42	62	104	48	—	—	—	—	—
1985–86	New Jersey Devils	NHL	3	1	1	2	0	—	—	—	—	—
1985–86	Maine Mariners	AHL	—	—	—	—	—	5	2	2	4	0
1986–87	Maine Mariners	AHL	70	16	22	38	47	—	—	—	—	—
1987–88	Utica Devils	AHL	65	30	35	65	98	—	—	—	—	—
1987–88	New Jersey Devils	NHL	1	0	0	0	2	—	—	—	—	—
1988–89	Utica Devils	AHL	15	7	4	11	19	—	—	—	—	—
1988–89	Maine Mariners	AHL	16	2	3	5	13	—	—	—	—	—
1989–90	HC Fassa	ITA	30	38	32	70	66	—	—	—	—	—
1990–91	Genève-Servette HC	NLB	16	15	4	19	29	—	—	—	—	—
1991–92	Nottingham Panthers	BHL	31	63	66	129	48	8	17	9	26	37
1992–93	Nottingham Panthers	BHL	13	26	12	38	16	—	—	—	—	—
1992–93	Humberside Seahawks	BHL	19	37	28	65	22	8	9	12	21	18
1993–94	Humberside Hawks	BHL	28	46	39	85	46	6	8	5	13	6
1993–94	Roanoke Express	ECHL	8	3	3	6	4	—	—	—	—	—
AHL totals			166	55	64	119	177	5	2	2	4	0
NHL totals			4	1	1	2	2	—	—	—	—	—

=== International ===
Year	Team	Event	GP	G	A	Pts	PIM
1985	United States	WC	5	1	3	4	4
Senior totals			5	2	3	5	2

1986 United States Calgary cup

== Awards and honors ==
Award 1986 CCHA Player of the year	Year 1986
All-CCHA First Team	1983–84
AHCA West Second-Team All-American	1983–84
CCHA All-Tournament Team	1984, 1986
All-CCHA First Team	1985–86
AHCA West First-Team All-American	1985–86
BHL Player of the Year	1991–92

Awards and achievements
Preceded by Ray Staszak	CCHA Player of the Year; 1985–86	Succeeded by Wayne Gagné
Preceded by Bill Watson	NCAA Ice Hockey Scoring Champion; 1985–86	Succeeded by Tony Hrkac
