= 1985–86 Michigan State Spartans men's ice hockey season =

Sports season

National champion 1986 Great Lakes Invitational champion 1986 CCHA Champion 1986 NCAA tournament, champion
- Conference: 1st CCHA
- Home ice: Munn Ice Arena

Record
- Overall: 34–9–2
- Conference: 23–7–2
- Home: 20–1–2
- Road: 9–7–0
- Neutral: 5–1–0

Coaches and captains
- Head coach: Ron Mason
- Assistant coaches: Terry Christensen; George Gwozdecky
- Captain: Don McSween
- Alternate captain(s): Mitch Messier; Kevin Miller

The 1985–86 Michigan State Spartans men's ice hockey team represented Michigan State University in college ice hockey. In its 7th year under head coach Ron Mason the team compiled a 34–9–2 record and reached the NCAA tournament for the eighth time in its history. The Spartans defeated Harvard 6–5 in the championship game at the Providence Civic Center in Providence, Rhode Island.

== Season ==
Michigan State entered the 1985–86 season seeking to overcome previous postseason frustrations. Despite winning four conference tournament titles, the Spartans had failed to advance past the national quarterfinals in three of those instances, leading to public scrutiny regarding Ron Mason's ability to succeed in the NCAA tournament. Although the team lost its top three highest-scoring players from the previous season, they retained the goaltending duo of Bob Essensa and Norm Foster who had helped the Spartans set a new NCAA record with 38 wins. Due to the roster lacking in senior leadership, the captaincy went to junior defenseman Don McSween. To offset the loss of veteran experience, the program recruited a highly touted freshman class featuring top prospect Joe Murphy along with seven other freshmen who would see significant ice time with the Spartans.

=== Early season struggles ===
MSU got off to a good start with a pair of road wins over Ohio State before splitting a home-and-home with a surging Western Michigan squad. After three wins and a tie against lesser programs, the Spartans took on arch-rival Michigan and split another home-and-home series. After a week of exhibition matches against the Canadian National Team MSU again split a weekend series and while their home record was stellar they had dropped to 3–3 on the road. That mark wasn't improved when they split another road series against the normally hapless Illinois–Chicago and then dropped both road games against a good Lake Superior State team. The Spartans were able to recover a bit in the conference standings with a pair of home wins against the Buckeyes and lift their record to 11–6–1 before losing in their first non-conference game of the year to the former CCHA team Northern Michigan, their only home loss of the season.

=== Great Lakes Invitational ===
Michigan State entered the Great Lakes Invitational having won the previous 3 years but the team was in need of a shock to the system to shake it out of its doldrums. They got just that when they were pushed to the limit in the semifinal by WCHA bottom-feeder Michigan Tech, escaping with a 2–1 win in overtime. The next night it was almost as if a different team hit the ice when the Spartans cruised to an 8–3 win in the championship over defending national champions Rensselaer. Don McSween was named MVP of the tournament.

=== Charging up the standings ===
Michigan State had a good deal of ground to make up in the second half of their season and the kicked it off with a sweep of Western Michigan and Miami they were slowed down by Ferris State and Michigan who provided MSU with a tie and loss respectively, but the Spartans were buoyed by playing 7 of their final 8 games at home and they took every game to finish the season at 23–7–2 in CCHA play, one win ahead of both Western Michigan and Bowling Green. The biggest standout for the year was former walk-on Mike Donnelly who had amassed a huge number of goals and was beginning to draw attention from NHL scouts.

=== CCHA tournament ===
The Spartans entered the CCHA tournament against Michigan and while the Wolverines had beaten MSU twice both had been in the Wolverine's arena and with Michigan State playing host the Spartans were able to drop Michigan in both games to take the quarterfinal series. Michigan State headed down the road to Detroit for the championship rounds, and faced stiff competition from lake Superior State but the Spartans edged out the Lakers 3–2 in overtime. In the championship game the following night MSU's offense, which finished second-best in the nation, failed them and they could only manage a single goal against Western Michigan's Bill Horn, ending their 4-year reign as CCHA tournament champion.

=== NCAA tournament ===
Fortunately, the Spartans had played well enough over the course of the season to earn an at-large bid to the NCAA tournament. They had played so well, in fact, that they were seeded ahead of Western Michigan and would play at home in the quarterfinal round. MSU used the massive home advantage they had to beat Boston College in both games and advance to the Frozen Four. In the semifinal MSU was met by perennial power Minnesota who had upset the top eastern seed Boston University in the quarters. Both teams were built around scoring and that fact shone through the game; Michigan State won the match 6–4 with Norm Foster turning aside 42 shots.

With the win Michigan State made its first championship game in 20 years and only had Harvard left to stop them. Before the game had even started, however, MSU gained an advantage over the Crimson; Hobey Baker Award winner Scott Fusco had injured his knee in the other semifinal and couldn't play in the final. Despite missing their best player, Harvard got off to a fast start gaining a 2–0 lead by the 8-minute mark. MSU cut the lead in half at the end of the first but Allen Bourbeau scored his second goal of the night to give the Crimson their 2-goal lead back. Harvard's third goal was scored on just their seventh shot of the night and it looked as if the Spartans were outclassed. Not to be deterred, however, Jeff Parker cut the lead back to one with Bourbeau's third of the night coming 10 minutes later. Mike Donnelly scored his 58th goal of the season just before the end of the second to give MSU a fighting change in the final period.

Sure enough MSU's offense came through when needed and two freshman found the back of the net before the three-minute mark to give the Spartans their first lead of the night. Harvard responded with the tying goal four minutes later and the two teams fought furiously to regain the lead. with just under three minutes to play Donnelly scored his second of the game to give MSU the lead and the Spartans held on to win the national championship.

=== Awards and honors ===
Mike Donnelly was awarded the Tournament MOP and was joined by Norm Foster, Don McSween and Jeff Parker on the All-Tournament Team. Donnelly was also named to the AHCA All-American West First Team while McSween was named to the Second Team. Donnelly and McSween both made it onto the All-CCHA First Team while Bob Essensa made the Second team. Joe Murphy was awarded the CCHA Rookie of the Year and would become the first college player to be take first overall in the NHL entry draft. Murphy was joined by 12 of his teammates from the 1985–86 Spartans, an astounding number of NHL players for a college team.

Mike Donnelly's 59 goals was the highest total scored since the NCAA created Division I in 1973. Only Phil Latreille has scored more in a season, doing so in the early 1960s, before there were any divisions in college ice hockey.

Rick Tosto became the first player in NCAA history to win national titles with two separate teams. After winning with Renssealer in 1985 he transferred closer to his home of Dearborn Heights, Michigan and won with the Spartans.

== Standings ==
1985–86 Central Collegiate Hockey Association standings
| | Conference | | | | | | | Overall | | | | | |
| | GP | W | L | T | PTS | GF | GA | GP | W | L | T | GF | GA |
|---|---|---|---|---|---|---|---|---|---|---|---|---|---|
| Michigan State† | 32 | 23 | 7 | 2 | 48 | 177 | 124 | 45 | 34 | 9 | 2 | 245 | 161 |
| Bowling Green | 32 | 23 | 9 | 0 | 46 | 179 | 129 | 42 | 28 | 14 | 0 | 218 | 164 |
| Western Michigan* | 32 | 23 | 9 | 0 | 46 | 189 | 138 | 44 | 32 | 12 | 0 | 256 | 177 |
| Lake Superior State | 32 | 17 | 14 | 1 | 35 | 133 | 124 | 43 | 24 | 18 | 1 | 170 | 153 |
| Ohio State | 32 | 16 | 15 | 1 | 33 | 157 | 177 | 43 | 23 | 19 | 1 | 219 | 203 |
| Ferris State | 32 | 13 | 17 | 2 | 28 | 152 | 174 | 38 | 17 | 19 | 2 | 191 | 202 |
| Illinois-Chicago | 32 | 12 | 20 | 0 | 24 | 137 | 161 | 40 | 14 | 25 | 1 | 164 | 197 |
| Michigan | 32 | 10 | 22 | 0 | 20 | 151 | 184 | 38 | 12 | 26 | 0 | 182 | 222 |
| Miami | 32 | 3 | 27 | 2 | 8 | 113 | 177 | 38 | 8 | 28 | 2 | 158 | 201 |
Championship: Western Michigan † indicates conference regular season champion * indicates conference tournament champion

== Schedule ==
| Date | Opponent^{#} | Rank^{#} | Site | Result | Record |
Regular season
| October 11 | at Ohio State | | OSU Ice Rink • Columbus, Ohio | W 6–2 | 1–0 (1–0) |
| October 12 | at Ohio State | | OSU Ice Rink • Columbus, Ohio | W 5–2 | 2–0 (2–0) |
| October 18 | at Western Michigan | | Lawson Arena • Kalamazoo, Michigan | L 1–5 | 2–1 (2–1) |
| October 19 | vs. Western Michigan | | Munn Ice Arena • East Lansing, Michigan | W 4–3 | 3–1 (3–1) |
| October 25 | vs. Miami | | Munn Ice Arena • East Lansing, Michigan | W 5–2 | 42–1 (4–1) |
| October 26 | vs. Miami | | Munn Ice Arena • East Lansing, Michigan | W 7–2 | 5–1 (5–1) |
| November 1 | vs. Ferris State | | Munn Ice Arena • East Lansing, Michigan | T 5–5 ^{OT} | 5–1–1 (5–1–1) |
| November 2 | at Ferris State | | Ewigleben Arena • Big Rapids, Michigan | W 5–3 | 6–1–1 (6–1–1) |
| November 8 | at Michigan | | Yost Ice Arena • Ann Arbor, Michigan | L 4–5 | 6–2–1 (6–2–1) |
| November 9 | vs. Michigan | | Munn Ice Arena • East Lansing, Michigan | W 6–2 | 7–2–1 (7–2–1) |
| November 15 | vs. Canadian National Team | | Munn Ice Arena • East Lansing, Michigan (exhibition) | W 3–5 | 7–2–1 (7–2–1) |
| November 16 | vs. Canadian National Team | | Munn Ice Arena • East Lansing, Michigan (exhibition) | W 5–4 ^{OT} | 7–2–1 (7–2–1) |
| November 22 | vs. Bowling Green | | Munn Ice Arena • East Lansing, Michigan | W 4–3 ^{OT} | 8–2–1 (8–2–1) |
| November 23 | at Bowling Green | | BGSU Ice Arena • Bowling Green, Ohio | L 5–6 ^{OT} | 8–3–1 (8–3–1) |
| November 28 | at Illinois–Chicago | | UIC Pavilion • Chicago, Illinois | W 6–4 | 9–3–1 (9–3–1) |
| November 29 | at Illinois–Chicago | | UIC Pavilion • Chicago, Illinois | L 2–3 | 9–4–1 (9–4–1) |
| December 6 | at Lake Superior State | | Taffy Abel Arena • Sault Ste. Marie, Michigan | L 3–7 | 9–5–1 (9–5–1) |
| December 7 | at Lake Superior State | | Taffy Abel Arena • Sault Ste. Marie, Michigan | L 5–6 ^{OT} | 9–6–1 (9–6–1) |
| December 14 | vs. Ohio State | | Munn Ice Arena • East Lansing, Michigan | W 6–5 ^{OT} | 10–6–1 (10–6–1) |
| December 15 | vs. Ohio State | | Munn Ice Arena • East Lansing, Michigan | W 8–0 | 11–6–1 (11–6–1) |
| December 19 | vs. Northern Michigan* | | Munn Ice Arena • East Lansing, Michigan | L 2–3 | 11–7–1 (11–6–1) |
Great Lakes Invitational
| December 28 | vs. Michigan Tech* | | Joe Louis Arena • Detroit, Michigan (Tournament Semifinal) | W 2–1 ^{OT} | 12–7–1 (11–6–1) |
| December 29 | vs. Rensselaer* | | Joe Louis Arena • Detroit, Michigan (Tournament championship) | W 8–3 | 13–7–1 (11–6–1) |
| January 4 | vs. Western Michigan | | Munn Ice Arena • East Lansing, Michigan | W 4–2 | 14–7–1 (12–6–1) |
| January 5 | at Western Michigan | | Lawson Arena • Kalamazoo, Michigan | W 8–5 | 15–7–1 (13–6–1) |
| January 10 | at Miami | | Goggin Ice Arena • Oxford, Ohio | W 8–3 | 16–7–1 (14–6–1) |
| January 11 | at Miami | | Goggin Ice Arena • Oxford, Ohio | W 6–3 | 17–7–1 (15–6–1) |
| January 17 | at Ferris State | | Ewigleben Arena • Big Rapids, Michigan | W 8–6 | 18–7–1 (16–6–1) |
| January 18 | vs. Ferris State | | Munn Ice Arena • East Lansing, Michigan | T 9–9 ^{OT} | 18–7–2 (16–6–2) |
| January 24 | vs. Michigan | | Munn Ice Arena • East Lansing, Michigan | W 7–5 | 19–7–2 (17–6–2) |
| January 25 | at Michigan | | Yost Ice Arena • Ann Arbor, Michigan | L 3–5 | 19–8–2 (17–7–2) |
| January 31 | vs. Northern Arizona* | | Munn Ice Arena • East Lansing, Michigan | W 12–2 | 20–8–2 (17–7–2) |
| February 1 | vs. Northern Arizona* | | Munn Ice Arena • East Lansing, Michigan | W 9–3 | 21–8–2 (17–7–2) |
| February 7 | at Bowling Green | | BGSU Ice Arena • Bowling Green, Ohio | W 7–4 | 22–8–2 (18–7–2) |
| February 8 | vs. Bowling Green | | Munn Ice Arena • East Lansing, Michigan | W 6–4 | 23–8–2 (19–7–2) |
| February 14 | vs. Illinois–Chicago | | Munn Ice Arena • East Lansing, Michigan | W 4–2 | 24–8–2 (20–7–2) |
| February 15 | vs. Illinois–Chicago | | Munn Ice Arena • East Lansing, Michigan | W 7–2 | 25–8–2 (21–7–2) |
| February 21 | vs. Lake Superior State | | Munn Ice Arena • East Lansing, Michigan | W 8–5 | 26–8–2 (22–7–2) |
| February 22 | vs. Lake Superior State | | Munn Ice Arena • East Lansing, Michigan | W 5–4 | 27–8–2 (23–7–2) |
CCHA tournament
| February 28 | vs. Michigan* | | Munn Ice Arena • East Lansing, Michigan (CCHA Quarterfinal game 1) | W 4–3 | 28–8–2 (23–7–2) |
| March 1 | vs. Michigan* | | Munn Ice Arena • East Lansing, Michigan (CCHA Quarterfinal game 2) | W 5–2 | 29–8–2 (23–7–2) |
Michigan State Wins Series 9-5
| March 7 | vs. Lake Superior State* | | Joe Louis Arena • Detroit, Michigan (CCHA Semifinal) | W 3–2 ^{OT} | 30–8–2 (23–7–2) |
| March 8 | vs. Western Michigan* | | Joe Louis Arena • Detroit, Michigan (CCHA championship) | L 1–3 | 30–9–2 (23–7–2) |
NCAA tournament
| March 22 | vs. Boston College* | | Munn Ice Arena • East Lansing, Michigan (National Quarterfinal game 1) | W 6–4 | 31–9–2 (23–7–2) |
| March 23 | vs. Boston College* | | Munn Ice Arena • East Lansing, Michigan (National Quarterfinal game 2) | W 4–2 | 32–9–2 (23–7–2) |
Michigan State Wins Series 10-6
| March 27 | vs. Minnesota* | | Providence Civic Center • Providence, Rhode Island (National Semifinal) | W 6–4 | 33–9–2 (23–7–2) |
| March 29 | vs. Harvard* | | Providence Civic Center • Providence, Rhode Island (National championship) | W 6–5 | 34–9–2 (23–7–2) |
*Non-conference game. ^{#}Rankings from USCHO.com Poll. Source:

== Roster and scoring statistics ==
| No. | Name | Year | Position | Hometown | S/P/C | Games | Goals | Assists | Pts | PIM |
|---|---|---|---|---|---|---|---|---|---|---|
| 14 | Mike Donnelly | Senior | LW | Detroit, MI | (Michigan) | 44 | 59 | 38 | 97 | 65 |
| 8 | Kevin Miller | Sophomore | RW | Lansing, MI | (Michigan) | 45 | 19 | 52 | 71 | 112 |
| 12 | Mitch Messier | Junior | RW | Regina, SK | (Saskatchewan) | 38 | 24 | 40 | 64 | 36 |
| 9 | Joe Murphy | Freshman | C | London, ON | (Ontario) | 35 | 24 | 37 | 61 | 50 |
| 16 | Bill Shibicky | Junior | F | Burnaby, BC | (British Columbia) | 44 | 17 | 39 | 56 | 104 |
| 27 | Brian McReynolds | Freshman | C | Penetanguishene, ON | (Ontario) | 45 | 14 | 24 | 38 | 78 |
| 5 | Don McSween | Junior | D | Detroit, MI | (Michigan) | 45 | 9 | 29 | 38 | 18 |
| 11 | Jeff Parker | Junior | RW | White Bear Lake, MN | (Minnesota) | 41 | 15 | 20 | 35 | 88 |
| 21 | Tom Tilley | Sophomore | D | Trenton, ON | (Ontario) | 42 | 9 | 25 | 34 | 48 |
| 17 | Bruce Rendall | Freshman | LW | Thunder Bay, ON | (Ontario) | 45 | 14 | 18 | 32 | 68 |
| 7 | Danton Cole | Freshman | RW | Pontiac, MI | (Michigan) | 43 | 11 | 10 | 21 | 22 |
| 15 | Bobby Reynolds | Freshman | RW | Fenton, MI | (Michigan) | 45 | 9 | 10 | 19 | 26 |
| 4 | Brad Beck | Senior | D | Vancouver, BC | (British Columbia) | 41 | 3 | 15 | 18 | 40 |
| 10 | Geir Hoff | Freshman | LW | Bergen, NOR | (Norway) | 39 | 3 | 11 | 14 | 14 |
| 3 | Brad Hamilton | Freshman | D | Calgary, AB | (Alberta) | 43 | 3 | 10 | 13 | 52 |
| 19 | Rick Tosto | Sophomore | F | Dearborn Heights, MI | (Michigan) | 30 | 4 | 8 | 12 | 10 |
| 22 | Sean Clement | Sophomore | D | Nepean, ON | (Ontario) | 40 | 4 | 7 | 11 | 40 |
| 6 | Chris Luongo | Freshman | D | Detroit, MI | (Michigan) | 38 | 1 | 5 | 6 | 29 |
| 25 | Dee Rizzo | Senior | D | Pittsburgh, PA | (Pennsylvania) | 28 | 0 | 5 | 5 | 12 |
| 28 | Rick Fernandez | Senior | LW | Dearborn, MI | (Michigan) | 12 | 0 | 3 | 3 | 6 |
| 26 | Dave Arkeilpane | Junior | F | Amherst, NY | (New York (state)) | 19 | 2 | 0 | 2 | 14 |
| 41 | Norm Foster | Junior | G | Vancouver, BC | (British Columbia) | 24 | 0 | 1 | 1 | 0 |
| 33 | Bob Essensa | Junior | G | Toronto, ON | (Ontario) | 23 | 0 | 1 | 1 | 2 |
| 18 | Dave Chiappelli | Sophomore | F | Pontiac, MI | (Michigan) | 1 | 0 | 0 | 0 | 0 |
| | Bench | - | - | - | - | 45 | - | - | - | 14 |
| Total | | | | | | | 245 | 406 | 651 | 955 |

== Goaltending statistics ==
| No. | Name | Games | Minutes | Wins | Losses | Ties | Goals Against | Saves | Shut Outs | SV % | GAA |
|---|---|---|---|---|---|---|---|---|---|---|---|
| 33 | Bob Essensa | 23 | 1333 | 17 | 4 | 1 | 74 | 548 | 1 | .881 | 3.33 |
| 41 | Norm Foster | 24 | 1414 | 17 | 5 | 1 | 87 | 620 | 0 | .877 | 3.69 |
| Total | | 45 | – | 34 | 9 | 2 | 161 | – | 1 | – | – |

== 1986 championship game ==
=== (W2) Michigan State vs. (E2) Harvard ===
| March 29 | Michigan State | 6 – 5 | Harvard | Providence Civic Center |

Scoring summary
| Period | Team | Goal | Assist(s) | Time | Score |
|---|---|---|---|---|---|
| 1st | HAR | Steve Armstrong | Follows and Ohno | 2:15 | 1–0 HAR |
| 1st | HAR | Allen Bourbeau | MacDonald and Smith | 8:10 | 2–0 HAR |
| 1st | MSU | Mitch Messier | Shibicky | 17:55 | 2–1 HAR |
| 2nd | HAR | Allen Bourbeau | Barakett and Pawlowski | 20:53 | 3–1 HAR |
| 2nd | MSU | Jeff Parker | Miller and Tilley | 26:48 | 3–2 HAR |
| 2nd | HAR | Allen Bourbeau | Krayer and Benning | 36:09 | 4–2 HAR |
| 2nd | MSU | Mike Donnelly | Miller and Messier | 38:30 | 4–3 HAR |
| 3rd | MSU | Brad Hamilton | Messier and Shibicky | 41:06 | 4–4 |
| 3rd | MSU | Brian McReynolds | Rendall and Parker | 42:15 | 5–4 MSU |
| 3rd | HAR | Andy Janfaza | Carone and Chiarelli | 46:46 | 5–5 |
| 3rd | MSU | Mike Donnelly – GW | Murphy | 57:09 | 6–5 MSU |

== Players drafted into the NHL ==
=== 1986 NHL entry draft ===
| = NHL All-Star team | = NHL All-Star | = NHL All-Star and NHL All-Star team | = Did not play in the NHL |

| Round | Pick | Player | NHL team |
|---|---|---|---|
| 1 | 1 | Joe Murphy | Detroit Red Wings |
| 2 | 30 | Neil Wilkinson† | Minnesota North Stars |
| 3 | 149 | Don Gibson† | Vancouver Canucks |
| 6 | 115 | Mike O'Toole† | St. Louis Blues |

† incoming freshman
