= 1986 NCAA Division I men's ice hockey tournament =

- Teams: 8
- Finals site: Providence Civic Center, Providence, Rhode Island
- Champions: Michigan State Spartans (2nd title)
- Runner-up: Harvard Crimson (2nd title game)
- Semifinalists: Minnesota Golden Gophers (11th Frozen Four); Denver Pioneers (12th Frozen Four)
- Winning coach: Ron Mason (1st title)
- MOP: Mike Donnelly (Michigan State)
- Attendance: 24,836

The 1986 NCAA Division I men's ice hockey tournament was the culmination of the 1985–86 NCAA Division I men's ice hockey season, the 39th such tournament in NCAA history. It was held between March 21 and 29, 1986, and concluded with Michigan State defeating Harvard 6-5. All Quarterfinals matchups were held at home team venues while all succeeding games were played at the Providence Civic Center in Providence, Rhode Island.

== Qualifying teams ==
The NCAA permitted 8 teams to qualify for the tournament and divided its qualifiers into two regions (East and West). Each of the tournament champions from the four Division I conferences (CCHA, ECAC, Hockey East and WCHA) received automatic invitations into the tournament with At-large bids making up the remaining 4 teams, 1 from each conference.

| East | | | | | | | West | | | | | | |
| Seed | School | Conference | Record | Berth type | Appearance | Last bid | Seed | School | Conference | Record | Berth type | Appearance | Last bid |
|---|---|---|---|---|---|---|---|---|---|---|---|---|---|
| 1 | Boston University | Hockey East | 25–12–4 | Tournament champion | 15th | 1984 | 1 | Denver | WCHA | 33–10–1 | Tournament champion | 12th | 1973 |
| 2 | Harvard | ECAC Hockey | 22–7–1 | At-large bid | 11th | 1985 | 2 | Michigan State | CCHA | 30–9–2 | At-large bid | 8th | 1985 |
| 3 | Boston College | Hockey East | 26–11–3 | At-large bid | 14th | 1985 | 3 | Western Michigan | CCHA | 32–10–0 | Tournament champion | 1st | Never |
| 4 | Cornell | ECAC Hockey | 20–6–4 | Tournament champion | 9th | 1981 | 4 | Minnesota | WCHA | 32–12–0 | At-large bid | 13th | 1985 |

== Format ==
The tournament featured three rounds of play. The two odd-number ranked teams from one region were placed into a bracket with the two even-number ranked teams of the other region. The teams were then seeded according to their ranking. In the Quarterfinals the first and fourth seeds and the second and third seeds played two-game aggregate series to determine which school advanced to the Semifinals. Beginning with the Semifinals all games were played at the Providence Civic Center and all series became Single-game eliminations. The winning teams in the semifinals advanced to the National Championship Game with the losers playing in a Third Place game.

== Tournament bracket ==
Quarterfinals; March 21–23
E1 | Boston University | 4 | 3 | 7
W4 | Minnesota | 6 | 5 | 11
W2 | Michigan State | 6 | 4 | 10
E3 | Boston College | 4 | 2 | 6
W1 | Denver | 4 | 3 | 7
E4 | Cornell | 2 | 4 | 6
E2 | Harvard | 4 | 7 | 11
W3 | Western Michigan | 2 | 2 | 4

Semifinals; March 27–28
W4 | Minnesota | 4
W2 | Michigan State | 6
W1 | Denver | 2
E2 | Harvard | 5

National championship March 29
W2 | Michigan State | 6
E2 | Harvard | 5
Third-place game
W4 | Minnesota | 6
W1 | Denver | 4

Note: * denotes overtime period(s)

=== Quarterfinals ===
==== (E1) Boston University vs. (W4) Minnesota ====
| March 21 | Boston University | 4 – 6 | Minnesota | Walter Brown Arena | Recap |
| (MacGregor, Sveen) Paul Gerlitz - 08:05 (Matchett, Kelfer) Scott Young - 08:32 | | First period | 00:52 - Gary Shopek (Chapman) |
| (Donatelli, Quinn) John Cullen - 08:46 | | Second period | 08:19 - PP - Steve MacSwain (Shopek, Cates) |
| (Cullen) Jay Octeau - PP - 17:34 | | Third period | 00:42 - Corey Millen (Berland, Mack); 06:34 - Tim Bergland (Millen); 07:17 - GW - Pat Micheletti (Snuggerud, Broten); 07:47 - Steve MacSwain (Okerlund) |
| (38 saves / 44 shots) Terry Taillefer | | Goalie stats | Frank Pietrangelo (33 saves / 37 shots) |

| March 22 | Boston University | 3 – 5 | Minnesota | Walter Brown Arena | Recap |
| (Donatelli, Cullen) Jay Octeau - PP - 02:51 (Kelfer, Quinn) Chris Matchett - 12:06 | | First period | No scoring |
| No scoring | | Second period | 17:29 - Corey Millen (Shopek); 19:16 - Tim Bergland (Chapman, Kellin) |
| (Cullen, Octeau) Clark Donatelli - PP - 15:50 | | Third period | 06:52 - Jay Cates (Okerlund, MacSwain); 09:33 - GW - Pat Micheletti (unassisted); 18:25 - EN - Steve MacSwain (Kellin) |
| (34 saves / 38 shots) Terry Taillefer | | Goalie stats | John Blue (31 saves / 34 shots) |

| Minnesota won series 11–7 |

==== (E2) Harvard vs. (W3) Western Michigan ====
| March 21 | Harvard | 4 – 2 | Western Michigan | Bright Hockey Center | Recap |
| (Fusco, Smith) Lane MacDonald - 00:39 (Sweeney, MacDonald) Tim Smith - 17:47 | | First period | 04:18 - Jeff Crossman (Thron) |
| (Smith, Barakett) Allen Bourbeau - GW - 00:17 | | Second period | 09:53 - Troy Thrun (Dorion, Gagne) |
| (Smith, Fusco) Lane MacDonald - PP - 09:45 | | Third period | No scoring |
| (17 saves / 19 shots) Grant Blair | | Goalie stats | Bill Horn (24 saves / 28 shots) |

| March 22 | Harvard | 7 – 2 | Western Michigan | Bright Hockey Center | Recap |
| (Bourbeau) Tim Barakett - 11:11 (MacDonald, Smith) Scott Fusco - 11:26 (Smith, Fusco) Lane MacDonald - GW - 15:31 | | First period | No scoring |
| (MacDonald) Scott Fusco - 00:38 (Taylor, Benning) Lane MacDonald - PP - 11:37 (Bourbeau, Barakett) Ed Krayer - 16:49 | | Second period | 09:47 - Dan Dorion (Crossman, Thrun); 19:37 - Dan Dorion (Adams, Gagne) |
| (MacDonald, Pawloski) Scott Fusco - EN - 08:33 | | Third period | No scoring |
| (31 saves / 33 shots) Grant Blair | | Goalie stats | Bill Horn (26 saves / 32 shots); Kevin McCaffrey (5 saves / 5 shots) |

| Harvard won series 11–4 |

==== (W1) Denver vs. (E4) Cornell ====
| March 21 | Denver | 4 – 2 | Cornell | DU Arena | Recap |
| No scoring | | First period | 09:07 - PP - Stewart Smith (Parry, Major) |
| (Mayer) John McMillan - 06:32 (Weiss, Hanson) Scott Mathias - 18:26 | | Second period | No scoring |
| (Gaume) Dwight Mathiasen - PP GW - 03:17 (Ecklebarger) Dwight Mathiasen - 11:22 | | Third period | 04:21 - Peter Natyshak (unassisted) |
| (23 saves / 25 shots) Chris Olson | | Goalie stats | Doug Dadswell (30 saves / 34 shots) |

| March 22 | Denver | 3 – 4 | Cornell | DU Arena | Recap |
| No scoring | | First period | 15:39 - Joe Nieuwendyk (Natyshak); 16:39 - Stewart Smith (Howe); 17:24 - Joe Nieuwendyk (unassisted) |
| (Mathias, Weiss) Grant Dion - 11:14 (Onstad, Lamb) Ed Cristofoli - 18:10 | | Second period | 12:14 - GW - Peter Natyshak (Niewuwendyk, Narcov) |
| (Weiss, Gaume) Dave Hanson - PP - 10:40 | | Third period | No scoring |
| (22 saves / 26 shots) Chris Olson | | Goalie stats | Doug Dadswell (44 saves / 47 shots) |

| Denver won series 7–6 |

==== (W2) Michigan State vs. (E3) Boston College ====
| March 22 | Michigan State | 6 – 4 | Boston College | Munn Ice Arena |
| (Miller, Messier) Don McSween – 08:17 (Miller, Messier) Mike Donnelly – 09:30 (Donnelly, Shibicky) Mitch Messier – 16:35 | | First period | 01:45 – Kevin Stevens (Janney) |
| (Miller, Messier) Mike Donnelly – 13:07 (Miller, Donnelly) Mitch Messier – GW – 16:34 | | Second period | 07:58 – Chris Stapleton (T. Sweeney); 15:39 – Doug Brown (Harlow, Hodge) |
| (Miller) Mike Donnelly – 00:15 | | Third period | 01:45 – Tim Sweeney (Stapleton) |
| (33 saves / 37 shots) Norm Foster | | Goalie stats | Scott Gordon (31 saves / 37 shots) |

| March 23 | Michigan State | 4 – 2 | Boston College | Munn Ice Arena |
| No scoring | | First period | No scoring |
| (Shibicky, Murphy) Mitch Messier – 08:43 (Messier, Donnelly) Brad Hamilton – 09:11 (Donnelly) Jeff Parker - GW – 13:42 | | Second period | 04:57 – Kevin Stevens (Marshall, Stapleton) |
| (unassisted) Kevin Miller – 13:22 | | Third period | 02:28 - SH – Doug Brown (Harlow, Marshall) |
| (36 saves / 38 shots) Bob Essensa | | Goalie stats | Scott Gordon (13 saves / 16 shots); Shaun Real (4 saves / 5 shots) |

| Michigan State won series 10–6 |

=== Semifinal ===
==== (W2) Michigan State vs. (W4) Minnesota ====
| March 27 | Michigan State | 6 – 4 | Minnesota | Providence Civic Center |
| (Hoff, Shibicky) Mitch Messier – 04:44 (McReynolds, Parker) Bruce Rendall – 05:22 | | First period | 03:13 – Steve Orth (Nanne) |
| (Foster) Brian McReynolds – 05:07 (unassisted) Kevin Miller – 12:03 (unassisted) Don McSween – SH GW – 14:16 | | Second period | 07:58 - PP – Paul Broten (Micheletti, Snuggerud); 15:15 - PP – Pat Micheletti (Millen, Cates) |
| (Tilley) Jeff Parker - EN – 19:24 | | Third period | 01:45 – Tony Kellin (Okerlund, MacSwain) |
| (42 saves / 46 shots) Norm Foster | | Goalie stats | Frank Pietrangelo (20 saves / 25 shots); John Blue (11 saves / 11 shots) |

==== (W1) Denver vs. (E2) Harvard ====
| March 28 | Denver | 2 – 5 | Harvard | Providence Civic Center | Recap |
| (Ecklebarger, Gaume) Dwight Mathiasen – 15:16 | | First period | 12:35 – Allen Bourbeau (Taylor, Benning) |
| (Mathias, Weiss) David Hanson – 09:37 | | Second period | 00:08 – PP – Tim Smith (MacDonald) |
| | | Third period | 06:31 – GW PP – Tim Smith (Taylor, MacDonald); 16:04 – Andy Janfaza (Pawloski, Chiarelli); 17:05 – Tim Smith (unassisted) |
| ( 25 saves / 30 shots ) Chris Olson | | Goalie stats | Grant Blair ( 38 saves / 40 shots ) |

=== Third-place game ===
==== (W1) Denver vs. (W4) Minnesota ====
| March 29 | Denver | 4 – 6 | Minnesota | Providence Civic Center | Recap |
| (Mathias, Hanson) Grant Dion - 18:06 (Onstad) Jeff Lamb - 18:44 | | First period | 03:33 - Corey Millen (Nanne); 14:53 - Corey Millen (Richards); 16:14 - Steve MacSwain (Cates, Okerlund) |
| (Ecklebarger) Jim Smith - 00:49 | | Second period | No scoring |
| (Weiss, Dion) Dallas Gaume - PP - 18:23 | | Third period | 14:23 - Todd Okerlund (MacSwain, Snuggerud); 14:55 - GW - Eric Dornfeld (MacSwain, Snuggerud); 19:36 - EN - Corey Millen (MacSwain) |
| (19 saves / 22 shots) Tom Allen (10 saves / 12 shots) Chris Olson | | Goalie stats | John Blue (20 saves / 24 shots) |

=== National Championship ===
==== (W2) Michigan State vs. (E2) Harvard ====
| March 29 | Michigan State | 6 – 5 | Harvard | Providence Civic Center |

Scoring summary
| Period | Team | Goal | Assist(s) | Time | Score |
|---|---|---|---|---|---|
| 1st | HAR | Steve Armstrong | Follows and Ohno | 2:15 | 1–0 HAR |
| 1st | HAR | Allen Bourbeau – PP | MacDonald and Smith | 8:10 | 2–0 HAR |
| 1st | MSU | Mitch Messier | Shibicky | 17:55 | 2–1 HAR |
| 2nd | HAR | Allen Bourbeau | Barakett and Pawlowski | 20:53 | 3–1 HAR |
| 2nd | MSU | Jeff Parker – SH | Miller and Tilley | 26:48 | 3–2 HAR |
| 2nd | HAR | Allen Bourbeau – PP | Krayer and Benning | 36:09 | 4–2 HAR |
| 2nd | MSU | Mike Donnelly – PP | Miller and Messier | 38:30 | 4–3 HAR |
| 3rd | MSU | Brad Hamilton | Messier and Shibicky | 41:06 | 4–4 |
| 3rd | MSU | Brian McReynolds | Rendall and Parker | 42:15 | 5–4 MSU |
| 3rd | HAR | Andy Janfaza | Carone and Chiarelli | 46:46 | 5–5 |
| 3rd | MSU | Mike Donnelly – GW | Murphy | 57:09 | 6–5 MSU |
Penalty summary
| Period | Team | Player | Penalty | Time | PIM |
| 1st | HAR | Lane MacDonald | Tripping | 4:14 | 2:00 |
| 1st | MSU | Kevin Miller | Hooking | 7:48 | 2:00 |
| 1st | HAR | Jerry Pawloski | High-sticking | 8:49 | 2:00 |
| 1st | MSU | Bill Shibicky | High-sticking | 8:49 | 2:00 |
| 2nd | MSU | Sean Clement | Interference | 21:36 | 2:00 |
| 2nd | MSU | Bill Shibicky | Elbowing | 24:58 | 2:00 |
| 2nd | HAR | Peter Follows | High-sticking | 28:16 | 2:00 |
| 2nd | MSU | Kevin Miller | High-sticking | 28:16 | 2:00 |
| 2nd | MSU | Brad Hamilton | Slashing | 35:38 | 2:00 |
| 2nd | HAR | Rob Ohno | Tripping | 37:27 | 2:00 |
| 3rd | HAR | Lane MacDonald | High-sticking | 47:20 | 2:00 |
| 3rd | MSU | Kevin Miller | High-sticking | 47:20 | 2:00 |
| 3rd | HAR | Josh Caplan | High-sticking | 49:45 | 2:00 |
| 3rd | MSU | Bruce Rendall | High-sticking | 49:45 | 2:00 |
| 3rd | HAR | Steve Armstrong | Roughing | 49:45 | 2:00 |
| 3rd | MSU | Brian McReynolds | Roughing | 49:45 | 2:00 |
| 3rd | MSU | Bench | Too many men (served by Dave Arkeilpane) | 59:42 | 2:00 |

Shots by period
| Team | 1 | 2 | 3 | T |
|---|---|---|---|---|
| Harvard | 6 | 10 | 4 | 20 |
| Michigan State | 12 | 10 | 11 | 33 |

Goaltenders
| Team | Name | Saves | Goals against | Time on ice |
|---|---|---|---|---|
| HAR | Grant Blair | 27 | 6 | |
| MSU | Bob Essensa | 15 | 5 | |

== All-Tournament team ==
- G: Norm Foster (Michigan State)
- D: Mark Benning (Harvard)
- D: Don McSween (Michigan State)
- F: Allen Bourbeau (Harvard)
- F: Mike Donnelly* (Michigan State)
- F: Jeff Parker (Michigan State)

* Most Outstanding Player(s)

== Quick facts ==
- The total championship attendance was 57,826
- Lane MacDonald (4 G, 7 A) of Harvard and Mitch Messier (5 G, 6 A) of Michigan St each tallied 11 points in the tournament, most by any players
- The following records were set or tied:
  - Most Assists, Individual, Game – 5, Kevin Miller, Michigan St, first round, game 1, tied
  - Shots on Goal, Both Teams, Period – 40, Minnesota (23) vs Michigan St (17), semifinals, second period, 5 goals
