= Jim Smith (ice hockey, born 1964) =

American ice hockey player

- Born: January 18, 1964 (age 62) Castlegar, British Columbia, Canada
- Height: 6 ft 1 in (185 cm)
- Weight: 185 lb (84 kg; 13 st 3 lb)
- Position: Defenceman
- Shot: Left
- Played for: Denver; Adirondack Red Wings
- Playing career: 1982–1988

James Smith is a Canadian retired ice hockey defenceman who was an All-American for Denver.

== Career ==
Smith was a solid player for Denver for most of his time with the Pioneers. For his first two seasons, he produced decent numbers but wasn't able to help the team finish any better than 5th in the 6-team WCHA. As a junior, the team got marginally better, recording a winning season for the first time since he joined the squad but still ended up 5th in the standings (now with 8 teams in the conference). All of that changed in his senior season.

Denver jumped out to a fast start in 1985 and rode the success to a first-place finish. Smith nearly doubled his career best offensive output and led the defensive corps in scoring, ending up in a tie for 5th in the nation from the blueline. He was named an All-American and helped the Pioneers win the WCHA Tournament for the first time since 1973. They also made their first NCAA Tournament for the first time in 13 years and reached the Frozen Four.

After graduating, Smith was able to use the success he found as a senior to continue his playing career. He produced respectable numbers for the Adirondack Red Wings over a season and a half but retired as a player in 1988.

== Statistics ==
=== Regular season and playoffs ===
			Regular Season					Playoffs
Season	Team	League	GP	G	A	Pts	PIM	GP	G	A	Pts	PIM
1982–83	Denver	WCHA	36	10	18	28	10	—	—	—	—	—
1983–84	Denver	WCHA	36	5	15	20	24	—	—	—	—	—
1984–85	Denver	WCHA	37	7	18	25	40	—	—	—	—	—
1985–86	Denver	WCHA	47	10	40	50	37	—	—	—	—	—
1986–87	Adirondack Red Wings	AHL	77	8	27	35	43	—	—	—	—	—
1987–88	Adirondack Red Wings	AHL	41	3	10	13	36	—	—	—	—	—
NCAA totals			156	32	91	123	111	—	—	—	—	—
AHL totals			118	11	37	48	79	—	—	—	—	—

== Awards and honours ==
Award	Year
AHCA West Second-Team All-American	1985–86
