= Chris Olson =

American ice hockey player

- Born: July 4, 1964 (age 60); New Hope, Minnesota, U.S.
- Height: 6 ft 2 in (188 cm)
- Weight: 190 lb (86 kg; 13 st 8 lb)
- Position: Goaltender
- Caught: Left
- Played for: Denver
- NHL draft: 1986 NHL Supplemental Draft; Boston Bruins
- Playing career: 1983–1987

Chris Olson (born July 4, 1964) is an American former professional ice hockey goaltender who was an All-American for Denver.

== Career ==
Olson arrived at Denver when the program was in a lull. He split time in goal as a freshman while the team allowed more than five goals per game and finished 11 games below .500. Both Olson and the team improved after the inauspicious start and he became the team's primary starter as a sophomore. The Pioneers improved on the whole but were just a middling team in the WCHA. All of that changed in Olson's junior year.

Denver started hot and ended up finishing atop their conference standings, their first title in eight years. Olson had split time with Tom Allen during the season but he finished in the top 5 in the country with a 3.12 goals against average. Olson was named an All-American and led the Pioneers to their first conference championship in thirteen years. In their first NCAA Tournament appearance since 1973, Denver won a narrow victory in the quarterfinals. Their run ended against Harvard when Olson couldn't hold back a Crimson surge in the third period.

Olson's fantastic season placed him squarely in the sights of the NHL and he was selected by the Boston Bruins in the NHL Supplemental Draft. Entering his senior season, the hope was that Olson and Denver could continue as they had in 1986 but the Pioneers under Ralph Backstrom turned out to be a one-year wonder. Olson's GAA swelled by more than a goal per game and the team won 15 fewer games. Rather than pursue a professional career, Olson retired as a player after the year.

== Statistics ==
=== Regular season and playoffs ===
			Regular season									Playoffs
Season	Team	League	GP	W	L	T	MIN	GA	SO	GAA	SV%	GP	W	L	MIN	GA	SO	GAA	SV%
1981–82	Robbinsdale Armstrong High School	MN-HS	—	—	—	—	—	—	—	—	—	—	—	—	—	—	—	—	—
1982–83	Robbinsdale Armstrong High School	MN-HS	—	—	—	—	—	—	—	—	—	—	—	—	—	—	—	—	—
1983–84	Denver	WCHA	15	7	6	0	—	—	0	5.09	.860	—	—	—	—	—	—	—	—
1984–85	Denver	WCHA	21	—	—	—	—	—	0	4.23	.877	—	—	—	—	—	—	—	—
1985–86	Denver	WCHA	27	—	—	—	—	—	1	3.12	.900	—	—	—	—	—	—	—	—
1986–87	Denver	WCHA	22	10	11	1	1327	92	1	4.16	.875	—	—	—	—	—	—	—	—
NCAA totals			85	—	—	—	—	321	2	—	.880	—	—	—	—	—	—	—	—

== Awards and honors ==
Award	Year
AHCA West Second-Team All-American	1985–86
