= Jay Octeau =

American ice hockey player (1965–2022)

- Born: March 24, 1965 Providence, Rhode Island, US
- Died: 27 June 2022 (aged 57) Providence, Rhode Island, US
- Height: 5 ft 10 in (178 cm)
- Weight: 181 lb (82 kg; 12 st 13 lb)
- Position: Defenseman
- Shot: Right
- Played for: Boston University; New Haven Nighthawks; Flint Spirits
- NHL draft: 165th, 1983; New Jersey Devils
- Playing career: 1983–1988

Jay Octeau (March 24, 1965 - June 27, 2022) was an American retired ice hockey defenseman who was an All-American for Boston University.

== Career ==
Octeau was a hot commodity coming out of Mount Saint Charles Academy. He was selected by the New Jersey Devils in the NHL Draft straight out of high school and then began attending Boston University. Octeau was a depth player for the Terriers as a freshman but his defensive work helped BU to the top defense in the country and the team returned to the NCAA Tournament for the first time in six years. Unfortunately, the team squandered a 3-goal advantage in the second game of their quarterfinal match and were knocked out in triple overtime by eventual champion Bowling Green.

Octeau transitioned into a more prominent role as a sophomore. While Octeau's point production more than doubled, he missed a few games during the season so he could play for the United States at the 1985 World Junior Ice Hockey Championships. He couldn't help the team finish better than 6th and returned to the Terriers, only to find the team's defense languishing, allowing almost a full goal more per game than they had the year before. The Terriers finished second in the newly formed Hockey East but they were kept out of the national tournament when a lower-seeded Providence won the conference title.

For his junior season, Octeau continued to improve his offensive numbers by leaps and bounds. The team had a better year as well, capturing the Hockey East title and earned the top eastern seed for the 1986 NCAA Tournament. Octeau was an All-American for the year despite not appearing on either all-conference team. The Terriers, meanwhile, weren't able to keep pace with Minnesota and surrendered 11 goals in 2 games. They were swept out in the quarterfinals. BU flagged in Octeau's senior season, dropping back to the middle of the conference. It was the only season with Octeau that the Terriers didn't win at least 20 games or a single postseason game.

The following year Octeau began his professional career but the results weren't favorable. Other than just a single game, Octeau spent his time in the IHL. He only appeared in half the team's games and ended up retiring after the year.

== Statistics ==
=== Regular season and playoffs ===
			Regular Season					Playoffs
Season	Team	League	GP	G	A	Pts	PIM	GP	G	A	Pts	PIM
1982–83	Mount Saint Charles Academy	RI-HS	23	9	32	41	—	—	—	—	—	—
1983–84	Boston University	ECAC Hockey	27	1	6	7	20	—	—	—	—	—
1984–85	Boston University	Hockey East	38	2	14	16	42	—	—	—	—	—
1985–86	Boston University	Hockey East	41	8	27	35	47	—	—	—	—	—
1986–87	Boston University	Hockey East	37	5	23	28	40	—	—	—	—	—
1987–88	New Haven Nighthawks	AHL	1	0	0	0	0	—	—	—	—	—
1987–88	Flint Spirits	IHL	38	1	8	9	12	—	—	—	—	—
NCAA totals			143	16	70	86	149	—	—	—	—	—

=== International ===
Year	Team	Event	Result	GP	G	A	Pts	PIM
1985	United States	WJC	6th	7	1	2	3	2

== Awards and honors ==
Award	Year
AHCA East Second-Team All-American	1985–86
