= Scott Shaunessy =

American ice hockey player (born 1964)

- Born: January 22, 1964 (age 62) Newport, Rhode Island, U.S.A.
- Height: 6 ft 4 in (193 cm)
- Weight: 220 lb (100 kg; 15 st 10 lb)
- Position: Defense
- Shot: Left
- Played for: Quebec Nordiques
- NHL draft: 192nd overall, 1983; Quebec Nordiques
- Playing career: 1987–1999

Scott Thomas Shaunessy (born January 22, 1964) is an American retired professional ice hockey player who played seven games in the National Hockey League with the Quebec Nordiques during 1986–87 and 1988–89 seasons. The rest of his career, which lasted from 1987 to 1999, was spent in the minor leagues. He has two daughters who also both play hockey, Caroline Shaunessy who played for IFK Helsinki and graduated from and played at Dartmouth College, and Julia Shaunessy who played at his alma mater Boston University.

== Career statistics ==
=== Regular season and playoffs ===
			Regular season					Playoffs
Season	Team	League	GP	G	A	Pts	PIM	GP	G	A	Pts	PIM
1982–83	St. John's Preparatory School	HS-MA	23	7	32	39	—	—	—	—	—	—
1983–84	Boston University	ECAC	40	6	22	28	48	—	—	—	—	—
1984–85	Boston University	ECAC	42	7	15	22	87	—	—	—	—	—
1985–86	Boston University	ECAC	38	6	13	19	31	—	—	—	—	—
1986–87	Boston University	ECAC	32	2	13	15	71	—	—	—	—	—
1986–87	Quebec Nordiques	NHL	3	0	0	0	7	—	—	—	—	—
1987–88	Fredericton Express	AHL	60	0	9	9	257	1	0	0	0	2
1988–89	Quebec Nordiques	NHL	4	0	0	0	16	—	—	—	—	—
1988–89	Halifax Citadels	AHL	41	3	10	13	106	—	—	—	—	—
1989–90	Halifax Citadels	AHL	27	3	5	8	105	—	—	—	—	—
1989–90	Fort Wayne Komets	IHL	45	3	9	12	267	5	0	1	1	31
1990–91	Albany Choppers	IHL	34	3	9	12	126	—	—	—	—	—
1990–91	Muskegon Lumberjacks	IHL	23	1	4	5	104	5	0	0	0	21
1991–92	Fort Wayne Komets	IHL	53	3	8	11	243	7	0	1	1	27
1992–93	Cincinnati Cyclones	IHL	71	2	7	9	222	—	—	—	—	—
1996–97	Austin Ice Bats	WPHL	32	3	4	7	138	6	3	0	3	22
1997–98	Tupelo T-Rex	WPHL	—	—	—	—	—	—	—	—	—	—
1998–99	Fort Worth Brahmas	WPHL	55	9	14	23	190	12	0	3	3	26
IHL totals			226	12	37	49	962	17	0	2	2	79
NHL totals			7	0	0	0	23	—	—	—	—	—

== Awards and honors ==
Award	Year
All-Hockey East Second Team	1984–85
All-Hockey East First Team	1985–86
Hockey East All-Tournament Team	1986
