= Tim Bergland =

American ice hockey player (born 1965)

- Born: 11 January 1965 Crookston, Minnesota, U.S.
- Height: 6 ft .03 in (183 cm)
- Weight: 185 lb (84 kg; 13 st 3 lb)
- Position: Right wing
- Shot: Right
- Played for: Washington Capitals; Tampa Bay Lightning; HIFK Helsinki
- National team: United States
- NHL draft: 75th overall, 1983; Washington Capitals
- Playing career: 1983–1999

Timothy Daniel Bergland (born January 11, 1965) is an American former professional ice hockey player.

== Playing career ==
Born in Crookston, Minnesota, and raised in Thief River Falls, Minnesota, Bergland was selected by the Washington Capitals in the 1983 NHL entry draft, he did not make it onto the Capitals' roster until the 1989–90 season when his defensive play helped guide the Capitals to their first-ever semifinals appearance.

Left exposed in the 1992 NHL Expansion Draft, Bergland was claimed by the Tampa Bay Lightning. He would have a second tour with the Capitals, albeit briefly, when he was claimed on waivers during the 1993–94 season.

Bergland retired from active play in 1999 after playing several seasons with the Chicago Wolves of the International Hockey League. Played 7 games in Finland during 1997–98 season.

== Coaching ==
Head Coach 1999-2004 Fergus Falls

Assistant Coach 2004-2008 Thief River Falls Prowlers boys hockey team.

Head coach 2008-current Thief River Falls Prowlers boys hockey team.

== Career statistics ==
=== Regular season and playoffs ===
			Regular season					Playoffs
Season	Team	League	GP	G	A	Pts	PIM	GP	G	A	Pts	PIM
1981–82	Thief River Falls High School	HS-MN	20	16	20	36	—	—	—	—	—	—
1982–83	Thief River Falls High School	HS-MN	20	30	23	53	—	—	—	—	—	—
1983–84	University of Minnesota	WCHA	24	4	11	15	24	—	—	—	—	—
1984–85	University of Minnesota	WCHA	46	7	12	19	16	—	—	—	—	—
1985–86	University of Minnesota	WCHA	48	11	16	27	26	—	—	—	—	—
1986–87	University of Minnesota	WCHA	49	18	17	35	48	—	—	—	—	—
1987–88	Fort Wayne Komets	IHL	13	2	1	3	9	—	—	—	—	—
1987–88	Binghamton Whalers	AHL	63	21	26	47	31	4	0	0	0	0
1988–89	Baltimore Skipjacks	AHL	78	24	29	53	39	—	—	—	—	—
1989–90	Baltimore Skipjacks	AHL	47	12	19	31	55	—	—	—	—	—
1989–90	Washington Capitals	NHL	32	2	5	7	31	15	1	1	2	10
1990–91	Baltimore Skipjacks	AHL	15	8	9	17	16	—	—	—	—	—
1990–91	Washington Capitals	NHL	47	5	9	14	21	11	1	1	2	12
1991–92	Baltimore Skipjacks	AHL	11	6	10	16	5	—	—	—	—	—
1991–92	Washington Capitals	NHL	22	1	4	5	2	—	—	—	—	—
1992–93	Tampa Bay Lightning	NHL	27	3	3	6	11	—	—	—	—	—
1992–93	Atlanta Knights	IHL	49	18	21	39	26	9	3	3	6	10
1993–94	Washington Capitals	NHL	3	0	0	0	4	—	—	—	—	—
1993–94	Tampa Bay Lightning	NHL	51	6	5	11	6	—	—	—	—	—
1993–94	Atlanta Knights	IHL	19	6	7	13	6	—	—	—	—	—
1994–95	Chicago Wolves	IHL	81	12	21	33	70	3	1	2	3	4
1995–96	Chicago Wolves	IHL	81	9	19	28	45	9	0	1	1	4
1996–97	Chicago Wolves	IHL	82	20	22	42	26	4	1	1	2	0
1997–98	HIFK Helsinki	FIN	7	2	1	3	16	—	—	—	—	—
1997–98	Chicago Wolves	IHL	49	8	10	18	18	10	2	0	2	16
1998–99	Chicago Wolves	IHL	68	4	9	13	20	—	—	—	—	—
IHL totals			442	79	110	189	262	35	7	7	14	34
NHL totals			182	17	26	43	75	26	2	2	4	22

=== International ===
Year	Team	Event	GP	G	A	Pts	PIM
1995	United States	WC	5	1	1	3	2
Senior totals			5	2	1	3	2
