= 1986 CCHA men's ice hockey tournament =

Sports tournament

1986 CCHA Men's ice hockey tournament
- Dates: March 7–15, 1986
- Teams: 8
- Finals site: Joe Louis Arena; Detroit, Michigan
- Champions: Western Michigan (1st title)
- Winning coach: Bill Wilkinson (1st title)
- MVP: Bill Horn (Western Michigan)
- CCHA Men's Ice Hockey Tournaments

The 1986 CCHA Men's Ice Hockey Tournament was the 15th CCHA Men's Ice Hockey Tournament. It was played between March 7 and March 15, 1986. First round games were played at campus sites, while 'final four' games were played at Joe Louis Arena in Detroit, Michigan. By winning the tournament, Western Michigan received the Central Collegiate Hockey Association's automatic bid to the 1986 NCAA Division I Men's Ice Hockey Tournament.

== Format ==
The tournament featured three rounds of play. The team that finished below eighth place in the standings was not eligible for postseason play. In the quarterfinals, the first and eighth seeds, the second and seventh seeds, the third seed and sixth seeds and the fourth seed and fifth seeds played a best-of-three series, with the winners advancing to the semifinals. In the semifinals, the remaining highest and lowest seeds and second highest and second lowest seeds play a single-game, with the winners advancing to the finals. The tournament champion receives an automatic bid to the 1986 NCAA Division I Men's Ice Hockey Tournament.

== Conference standings ==
Note: GP = Games played; W = Wins; L = Losses; T = Ties; PTS = Points; GF = Goals For; GA = Goals Against

1985–86 Central Collegiate Hockey Association standings
	Conference							Overall					
	GP	W	L	T	PTS	GF	GA	GP	W	L	T	GF	GA
Michigan State†	32	23	7	2	48	177	124	45	34	9	2	245	161
Bowling Green	32	23	9	0	46	179	129	42	28	14	0	218	164
Western Michigan*	32	23	9	0	46	189	138	44	32	12	0	256	177
Lake Superior State	32	17	14	1	35	133	124	43	24	18	1	170	153
Ohio State	32	16	15	1	33	157	177	43	23	19	1	219	203
Ferris State	32	13	17	2	28	152	174	38	17	19	2	191	202
Illinois-Chicago	32	12	20	0	24	137	161	40	14	25	1	164	197
Michigan	32	10	22	0	20	151	184	38	12	26	0	182	222
Miami	32	3	27	2	8	113	177	38	8	28	2	158	201
Championship: Western Michigan † indicates conference regular season champion * indicates conference tournament champion

== Bracket ==
Quarterfinals; March 7–9
1	Michigan State	4	5	–
8	Michigan	3	2	–
2	Bowling Green	7	2*	–
7	Illinois–Chicago	2	1	–
(Pairings are reseeded after the first round)
3	Western Michigan	4	12	–
6	Ferris State	3	2	–
4	Lake Superior State	3	1	3*
5	Ohio State	1	4	2

Semifinals; March 13
1	Michigan State	3
4	Lake Superior State	2
2	Bowling Green	3
3	Western Michigan	4*

Championship; March 15
1	Michigan State	1
3	Western Michigan	3
Consolation Game
2	Bowling Green	3
4	Lake Superior State	0

Note: * denotes overtime period(s)

=== First round ===
==== (1) Michigan State vs. (8) Michigan ====
Michigan State	4 – 3	Michigan	Munn Ice Arena

Michigan State	5 – 2	Michigan	Munn Ice Arena

Michigan State won series 2–0

==== (2) Bowling Green vs. (7) Illinois–Chicago ====
Bowling Green	7 – 2	Illinois–Chicago	BGSU Ice Arena

Bowling Green	2 – 1	OT	Illinois–Chicago	BGSU Ice Arena

Bowling Green won series 2–0

==== (3) Western Michigan vs. (6) Ferris State ====
Western Michigan	4 – 3	Ferris State	Lawson Arena

Western Michigan	12 – 2	Ferris State	Lawson Arena

Western Michigan won series 2–0

==== (4) Lake Superior State vs. (5) Ohio State ====
Lake Superior State	3 – 1	Ohio State	Taffy Abel Arena

Lake Superior State	1 – 4	Ohio State	Taffy Abel Arena

Lake Superior State	3 – 2	OT	Ohio State	Taffy Abel Arena

Lake Superior State won series 2–1

=== Semifinals ===
==== (1) Michigan State vs. (4) Lake Superior State ====
March 13	Michigan State	3 – 2	OT	Lake Superior State	Joe Louis Arena

==== (2) Bowling Green vs. (3) Western Michigan ====
March 13	Bowling Green	3 – 4	OT	Western Michigan	Joe Louis Arena

=== Consolation Game ===
==== (2) Bowling Green vs. (4) Lake Superior State ====
March 15	Bowling Green	3 – 0	Lake Superior State	Joe Louis Arena

=== Championship ===
==== (1) Michigan State vs. (3) Western Michigan ====
March 15	Michigan State	1 – 3	Western Michigan	Joe Louis Arena

== Tournament awards ==
=== All-Tournament Team ===
- F Stu Burnie* (Western Michigan)
- F Jamie Wansbrough (Bowling Green)
- F Dan Dorion (Western Michigan)
- D Chris MacDonald (Western Michigan)
- D Wayne Gagné (Western Michigan)
- G Bill Horn (Western Michigan)

* Most Valuable Player(s)
