= Cliff Abrecht =

Canadian ice hockey player

- Born: May 14, 1963 (age 63) Toronto, Ontario, Canada
- Height: 6 ft 0 in (183 cm)
- Weight: 185 lb (84 kg; 13 st 3 lb)
- Position: Defenseman
- Shot: Left
- Played for: Princeton; St. Catharines Saints; Newmarket Saints; Baltimore Skipjacks; Milwaukee Admirals
- NHL draft: 168th, 1983; Toronto Maple Leafs
- Playing career: 1982–1988

Clifford H. Abrecht is a Canadian retired ice hockey defenseman who was an All-American for Princeton.

== Career ==
Abrecht began attending Princeton University in the fall of 1982. The Tigers weren't very good in those years but, despite the team's lack of success, Abrecht played well enough to get selected in the NHL Draft. He was a solid player for Princeton over his first three seasons but Abrecht had a tremendous finale. While serving as team captain, Abrecht set new program records for defensemen with 15 goals, 26 assists and 41 points. He also became the program's all-time leader for goals, assists and points by a defenseman (he was surpassed in assists in 2019). He did all of that in just 30 games and was named an All-American, the first for the program in 33 years. However, because the Tigers finished 9th in the ECAC Hockey standings, they weren't even allowed to participate in the conference tournament. Abrecht signed with the Toronto Maple Leafs after the season, playing 1 game for the St. Catharines Saints.

The next season, Abrecht moved to Newmarket along with the team and played the entire season in the AHL, posting modest numbers on a team that finished dead-last in the league. His second full professional season went much better though he ended up splitting time between AAA and AA hockey. Rather than continue his career, Abrecht retired after the 1988 season.

Having earned a bachelor's in Electrical Engineering and Computer Science, Abrecht received an MBA from Babson College in 1990 and began his second career. By the 21st century, Abrecht had risen to the position of Vice President in the Merck Millipore company and continues to work as an executive in the field as of 2021.

== Personal life ==
Abrecht's daughter, Charlotte, played college hockey at Holy Cross, graduating in 2020.

== Statistics ==
=== Regular season and playoffs ===
| | | | Regular Season | | | | | Playoffs |
| Season | Team | League | GP | G | A | Pts | PIM | GP | G | A | Pts | PIM |
|---|---|---|---|---|---|---|---|---|---|---|---|---|
| 1982–83 | Princeton | ECAC Hockey | 24 | 4 | 10 | 14 | 52 | — | — | — | — | — |
| 1983–84 | Princeton | ECAC Hockey | 23 | 9 | 9 | 18 | 62 | — | — | — | — | — |
| 1984–85 | Princeton | ECAC Hockey | 26 | 6 | 22 | 28 | 31 | — | — | — | — | — |
| 1985–86 | Princeton | ECAC Hockey | 30 | 15 | 26 | 41 | 42 | — | — | — | — | — |
| 1985–86 | St. Catharines Saints | AHL | 1 | 0 | 1 | 1 | 0 | — | — | — | — | — |
| 1986–87 | Newmarket Saints | AHL | 63 | 2 | 5 | 7 | 20 | — | — | — | — | — |
| 1987–88 | Baltimore Skipjacks | AHL | 33 | 2 | 9 | 11 | 18 | — | — | — | — | — |
| 1987–88 | Milwaukee Admirals | IHL | 36 | 12 | 10 | 22 | 22 | — | — | — | — | — |
| NCAA totals | | | 103 | 34 | 67 | 101 | 187 | — | — | — | — | — |
| AHL totals | | | 97 | 4 | 15 | 19 | 38 | — | — | — | — | — |

== Awards and honors ==
| Award | Year |
|---|---|
| All-ECAC Hockey First Team | 1985–86 |
| AHCA East First-Team All-American | 1985–86 |
