= Jeff Parker (ice hockey) =

American ice hockey player (1964–2017)

Jeffrey Lee Parker
- Born: September 7, 1964 St. Paul, Minnesota, U.S.
- Died: September 11, 2017 (aged 53) Minneapolis, Minnesota, U.S.
- Height: 6 ft 3 in (191 cm)
- Weight: 194 lb (88 kg; 13 st 12 lb)
- Position: Right wing
- Shot: Right
- Played for: Buffalo Sabres; Hartford Whalers
- NHL draft: 111th overall, 1982; Buffalo Sabres
- Playing career: 1986–1991

Jeffrey Lee Parker (September 7, 1964 – September 11, 2017) was an American professional ice hockey right wing. He was drafted in the sixth round, 111th overall, by the Buffalo Sabres in the 1982 NHL entry draft. He played 137 games in the National Hockey League (NHL) with the Sabres and four with the Hartford Whalers.

== Playing career ==
Parker was involved in two high-profile trades over the course of his career. Following his only complete NHL season, on the day of the 1990 entry draft the Sabres traded Parker to the Winnipeg Jets along with Phil Housley and Scott Arniel for Dale Hawerchuk and an exchange of draft picks seemingly in Buffalo's favour (which became Brad May and Keith Tkachuk). In an interview shortly after the trade, Parker stated "I'm pretty happy with the trade, I'm looking forward to coming to Winnipeg because the Jets look like a team that's moving up the ladder."

Parker reported to Winnipeg Jets training camp in Saskatoon, Saskatchewan, on September 7, 1990, in poor physical condition and ranked low in the fitness tests taken on the first day of camp. He played 5 pre-season games with the Jets, scoring two goals and earning one assist. He and Simon Wheeldon were the last two players cut by the Jets that camp and on October 2, 1990, was assigned to the Moncton Hawks, the Jets farm team in the American Hockey League.

Devastated about being assigned to the minors, Parker sat out most of the 1990–91 season until he was picked up by the Pittsburgh Penguins as a free agent in February 1991, only to be traded to Hartford along with John Cullen and Zarley Zalapski for Ron Francis, Ulf Samuelsson and Grant Jennings on March 4, 1991. Parker only played four games for the Whalers before suffering from career-ending injuries. In his second game with the Whalers on March 12, 1991, against the Washington Capitals, he was checked into the boards and was knocked out for five minutes, resulting in a concussion. He returned to the Whalers two weeks later before sustaining a season-ending knee injury against his former team, the Sabres.

In his 141-game NHL career, Parker scored 16 goals and 19 assists for a total of 35 points.

== Death ==
Parker died in Minneapolis on September 11, 2017, from complications of heart and lung infections. He was 53 years old. His brain was donated to Boston University to aid in chronic traumatic encephalopathy research. On May 3, 2018, it was reported that Parker had CTE level 3 when he died.

== Career statistics ==
=== Regular season and playoffs ===
			Regular season					Playoffs
Season	Team	League	GP	G	A	Pts	PIM	GP	G	A	Pts	PIM
1981–82	White Bear Mariner High School	HS-MN	28	8	13	21	32	—	—	—	—	—
1982–83	White Bear Mariner High School	HS-MN	28	14	14	28	—	—	—	—	—	—
1983–84	Michigan State University	CCHA	44	8	13	21	82	—	—	—	—	—
1984–85	Michigan State University	CCHA	42	10	12	22	85	—	—	—	—	—
1985–86	Michigan State University	CCHA	41	15	20	35	88	—	—	—	—	—
1986–87	Buffalo Sabres	NHL	15	3	3	6	7	—	—	—	—	—
1986–87	Rochester Americans	AHL	54	14	8	22	75	14	1	3	4	19
1987–88	Buffalo Sabres	NHL	4	0	2	2	2	—	—	—	—	—
1987–88	Rochester Americans	AHL	34	13	31	44	60	2	1	1	2	0
1988–89	Buffalo Sabres	NHL	57	9	9	18	82	5	0	0	0	26
1988–89	Rochester Americans	AHL	6	2	4	6	9	—	—	—	—	—
1989–90	Buffalo Sabres	NHL	61	4	5	9	70	—	—	—	—	—
1990–91	Hartford Whalers	NHL	4	0	0	0	2	—	—	—	—	—
1990–91	Muskegon Lumberjacks	IHL	11	1	7	8	13	—	—	—	—	—
NHL totals			141	16	19	35	163	5	0	0	0	26

== Awards and honors ==
Award	Year
All-NCAA All-Tournament Team	1986
