= 1986 Hockey East men's ice hockey tournament =

1986 Hockey East Men's ice hockey tournament
- Dates: March 7–15, 1986
- Teams: 7
- Finals site: Providence Civic Center; Providence, Rhode Island
- Champions: Boston University (1st title)
- Winning coach: Jack Parker (1st title)
- MVP: Peter Marshall (Boston University)
- Hockey East Men's Ice Hockey Tournaments

The 1986 Hockey East Men's Ice Hockey Tournament was the 2nd tournament in the history of the conference. It was played between March 7 and March 15, 1986. Quarterfinal games were played at home team campus sites, while the final four games were, for the first time, played at the Providence Civic Center in Providence, Rhode Island. This was the final year the Hockey East championship was decided at a venue outside of the state of Massachusetts (as of 2014). By winning the tournament, Boston University received the Hockey East's automatic bid to the 1986 NCAA Division I Men's Ice Hockey Tournament.

== Format ==
The tournament featured three rounds of play. In the quarterfinals, the second seed and seventh seed, the third seed and sixth seeds, and the fourth seed and fifth seeds played a two-game series where the team that scored the most total goals was declared the winner and advanced to the semifinals. In the semifinals, the first seed was matched against the lowest remaining quarterfinalist while the other remaining quarterfinalists met in a single-elimination game with the winners advancing to the championship game and the losers meeting in a third-place game. The tournament champion receives an automatic bid to the 1986 NCAA Division I Men's Ice Hockey Tournament.

== Conference standings ==
Note: GP = Games played; W = Wins; L = Losses; T = Ties; PTS = Points; GF = Goals For; GA = Goals Against

1985–86 Hockey East standings
	Conference							Overall					
	GP	W	L	T	PTS	GF	GA	GP	W	L	T	GF	GA
Boston College†	34	23	9	2	48	158	123	42	26	13	3	188	154
Boston University*	34	20	11	3	43	147	127	43	25	14	4	184	156
Northeastern	34	18	14	2	38	165	158	39	20	17	2	185	185
Providence	34	11	22	1	23	105	140	39	14	24	1	122	160
Maine	34	8	25	1	17	118	177	40	11	28	1	142	201
Lowell	34	5	27	2	12	118	166	42	11	29	2	156	205
New Hampshire	34	5	27	2	12	114	188	37	5	29	3	121	199
Championship: Boston University † indicates conference regular season champion * indicates conference tournament champion

== Bracket ==
Teams are reseeded after the quarterfinals

Quarterfinals; March 7–10
2	Boston University	1	4
7	New Hampshire	1	3
3	Northeastern	2	4
6	Lowell	4	3
4	Providence	5	5
5	Maine	4	2

Semifinals; March 14
1	Boston College	5
6	Lowell	2
2	Boston University	3
4	Providence	2

Championship; March 15
1	Boston College	4
2	Boston University	9
Consolation
4	Providence	5
6	Lowell	8

Note: * denotes overtime period(s)

=== Quarterfinals ===
==== (2) Boston University vs. (7) New Hampshire ====
March 7	Boston University	1 – 1	New Hampshire	Walter Brown Arena

March 8	Boston University	4 – 3	New Hampshire	Walter Brown Arena

Boston University won series 5–4

==== (3) Northeastern vs. (6) Lowell ====
March 7	Northeastern	2 – 4	Lowell	Matthews Arena

March 9	Northeastern	4 – 3	Lowell	Matthews Arena

Lowell won series 7–6

==== (4) Providence vs. (5) Maine ====
March 9	Providence	5 – 4	Maine	Schneider Arena

March 10	Providence	5 – 1	Maine	Schneider Arena

Providence won series 10–5

=== Semifinals ===
==== (1) Boston College vs. (6) Lowell ====
March 14	Boston College	5 – 2	Lowell	Providence Civic Center

==== (2) Boston University vs. (4) Providence ====
March 14	Boston University	3 – 2	Providence	Providence Civic Center

=== Consolation ===
==== (4) Providence vs. (6) Lowell ====
March 15	Providence	5 – 8	Lowell	Providence Civic Center

=== Championship ===
==== (1) Boston College vs. (2) Boston University ====
March 15	Boston College	4 – 9	Boston University	Providence Civic Center

== Tournament awards ==
=== All-Tournament Team ===
- F Ken Hodge (Boston College)
- F Peter Marshall* (Boston University)
- F Jeff Sveen (Boston University)
- D David Quinn (Boston University)
- D Scott Shaunessy (Boston University)
- G Terry Taillefer (Boston University)

* Tournament MVP(s)
