= Mike Donnelly =

American former ice hockey left wing

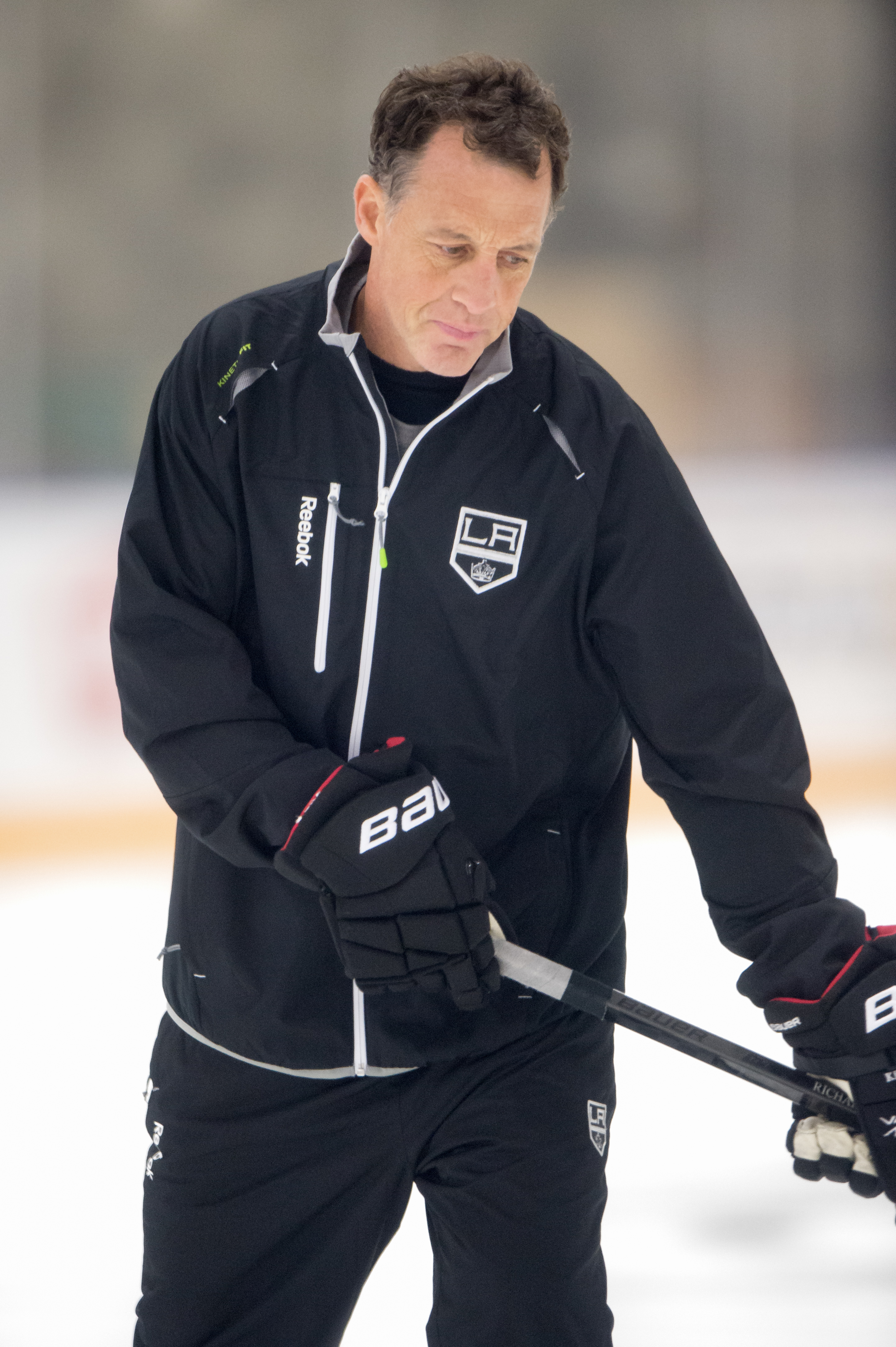
- Donnelly in 2013.
- Born: October 10, 1963 (age 62) Livonia, Michigan, U.S.
- Height: 5 ft 11 in (180 cm)
- Weight: 185 lb (84 kg; 13 st 3 lb)
- Position: Left wing
- Shot: Left
- Played for: AHL; New Haven Nighthawks; Rochester Americans; NHL; New York Rangers; Buffalo Sabres; Los Angeles Kings; Dallas Stars; New York Islanders
- NHL draft: Undrafted
- Playing career: 1986–1998

Michael Chene Donnelly (born October 10, 1963) is an American former ice hockey left wing. He played in the National Hockey League (NHL) between 1986 and 1996 with the New York Rangers, Buffalo Sabres, Los Angeles Kings, Dallas Stars, and New York Islanders.

In his NHL career, Donnelly appeared in 465 games. He scored 114 goals and added 121 assists. He is currently part of the player development department for the Kings.

In 1986, while playing for Michigan State University, Mike set the CCHA single season goals record with 59 goals (only Phil Latreille has scored more goals in a season in NCAA history), and that same year scored a total of 97 points which placed him 18th on the all-time points list for single season. He was named as the Most Outstanding Player of the 1986 NCAA Division I Men's Ice Hockey Tournament, which was won by Michigan State.

== Career statistics ==
			Regular season					Playoffs
Season	Team	League	GP	G	A	Pts	PIM	GP	G	A	Pts	PIM
1980–81	Franklin High School	HS-MC	—	—	—	—	—	—	—	—	—	—
1981–82	Waterford Lakers	GLJHL	46	48	64	112	—	—	—	—	—	—
1982–83	Michigan State University	CCHA	24	7	13	20	8	—	—	—	—	—
1983–84	Michigan State University	CCHA	44	18	14	32	40	—	—	—	—	—
1984–85	Michigan State University	CCHA	44	26	21	47	48	—	—	—	—	—
1985–86	Michigan State University	CCHA	44	59	38	97	65	—	—	—	—	—
1986–87	New York Rangers	NHL	5	1	1	2	0	—	—	—	—	—
1986–87	New Haven Nighthawks	AHL	58	27	34	61	52	7	2	0	2	9
1987–88	New York Rangers	NHL	17	2	2	4	8	—	—	—	—	—
1987–88	Colorado Rangers	IHL	8	7	11	18	15	—	—	—	—	—
1987–88	Buffalo Sabres	NHL	40	6	8	14	44	—	—	—	—	—
1988–89	Buffalo Sabres	NHL	22	4	6	10	10	—	—	—	—	—
1988–89	Rochester Americans	AHL	53	32	37	69	53	—	—	—	—	—
1989–90	Buffalo Sabres	NHL	12	1	2	3	8	—	—	—	—	—
1989–90	Rochester Americans	AHL	68	43	55	98	71	16	12	7	19	9
1990–91	Los Angeles Kings	NHL	53	7	5	12	41	12	5	4	9	6
1990–91	New Haven Nighthawks	AHL	18	10	6	16	2	—	—	—	—	—
1991–92	Los Angeles Kings	NHL	80	29	16	45	20	6	1	0	1	4
1992–93	Los Angeles Kings	NHL	84	29	40	69	45	24	6	7	13	14
1993–94	Los Angeles Kings	NHL	81	21	21	42	34	—	—	—	—	—
1994–95	Los Angeles Kings	NHL	9	1	1	2	4	—	—	—	—	—
1994–95	Dallas Stars	NHL	35	11	14	25	29	5	0	1	1	6
1995–96	Dallas Stars	NHL	24	2	5	7	10	—	—	—	—	—
1995–96	Michigan K-Wings	IHL	21	8	15	23	20	8	3	0	3	10
1996–97	New York Islanders	NHL	3	0	0	0	2	—	—	—	—	—
1996–97	Utah Grizzlies	IHL	14	7	2	9	33	—	—	—	—	—
1996–97	Detroit Vipers	IHL	19	4	4	8	12	—	—	—	—	—
1997–98	Detroit Vipers	IHL	6	0	2	2	2	—	—	—	—	—
1997–98	SC Bern	NLA	5	3	1	4	0	1	1	0	1	27
NHL totals			465	114	121	235	255	47	12	12	24	30

== Awards and honors ==
Award	Year
All-CCHA First Team	1985–86
AHCA West First-Team All-American	1985–86
All-NCAA All-Tournament Team	1986
NCAA Tournament MVP	1986

Awards and achievements
Preceded by Chris Terreri	NCAA Tournament Most Outstanding Player; 1986	Succeeded by Tony Hrkac
