= Brian McReynolds =

Canadian ice hockey player

- Born: January 5, 1965 (age 61) Penetanguishene, Ontario, Canada
- Height: 6 ft 1 in (185 cm)
- Weight: 192 lb (87 kg; 13 st 10 lb)
- Position: Centre
- Shot: Left
- Played for: Winnipeg Jets; New York Rangers; Los Angeles Kings
- National team: Canada
- NHL draft: 112th overall, 1985; New York Rangers
- Playing career: 1989–1999

Brian McReynolds (born January 5, 1965, in Penetanguishene, Ontario) is a former professional ice hockey player who played in the National Hockey League (NHL) for the Winnipeg Jets, New York Rangers, and Los Angeles Kings.

== Career statistics ==
=== Regular season and playoffs ===
			Regular season					Playoffs
Season	Team	League	GP	G	A	Pts	PIM	GP	G	A	Pts	PIM
1982–83	Penetang Kings	GMOHL	34	36	34	70	62	—	—	—	—	—
1983–84	Penetang Kings	GMOHL	28	31	42	73	75	—	—	—	—	—
1984–85	Orillia Travelways	OJHL	44	40	49	89	67	—	—	—	—	—
1985–86	Michigan State University	CCHA	45	14	24	38	78	—	—	—	—	—
1986–87	Michigan State University	CCHA	45	16	25	41	68	—	—	—	—	—
1987–88	Michigan State University	CCHA	43	10	24	34	50	—	—	—	—	—
1989–90	Moncton Hawks	AHL	72	18	41	59	87	—	—	—	—	—
1989–90	Winnipeg Jets	NHL	9	0	2	2	4	—	—	—	—	—
1990–91	Binghamton Rangers	AHL	77	30	42	72	74	10	0	4	4	6
1990–91	New York Rangers	NHL	1	0	0	0	0	—	—	—	—	—
1991–92	Binghamton Rangers	AHL	48	19	28	47	22	7	2	2	4	12
1992–93	Binghamton Rangers	AHL	79	30	70	100	88	14	3	10	13	18
1993–94	Phoenix Roadrunners	IHL	51	14	33	47	65	—	—	—	—	—
1993–94	Los Angeles Kings	NHL	20	1	3	4	4	—	—	—	—	—
1994–95	Phoenix Roadrunners	IHL	55	5	27	32	60	—	—	—	—	—
1994–95	Atlanta Knights	IHL	11	5	7	12	14	5	4	5	9	4
1995–96	Malmö IF	SHL	16	1	4	5	12	—	—	—	—	—
1995–96	EC Ratingen	DEL	6	2	4	6	29	—	—	—	—	—
1996–97	EC Ratingen	DEL	37	12	22	34	69	—	—	—	—	—
1997–98	Star Bulls Rosenheim	DEL	32	2	12	14	28	—	—	—	—	—
1997–98	Kölner Haie	DEL	13	2	6	8	6	3	0	0	0	4
1998–99	Kölner Haie	DEL	36	4	3	7	26	—	—	—	—	—
AHL totals			276	97	181	278	271	31	5	16	21	36
NHL totals			30	1	5	6	8	—	—	—	—	—
