= Dwight Mathiasen =

Canadian ice hockey player (born 1963)

- Born: May 12, 1963 (age 62) Brandon, Manitoba, Canada
- Height: 6 ft 1 in (185 cm)
- Weight: 196 lb (89 kg; 14 st 0 lb)
- Position: Right wing
- Shot: Right
- Played for: Pittsburgh Penguins
- NHL draft: Undrafted
- Playing career: 1986–1996

Dwight Wayne Mathiasen (born May 12, 1963) is a Canadian former professional ice hockey player who played 33 games in the National Hockey League with the Pittsburgh Penguins between 1986 and 1988. The rest of his career, which lasted from 1986 to 1996, was spent in different minor leagues.

Born in Brandon, Manitoba, Mathiasen was an all-American and all-WCHA player at the University of Denver.

== Career statistics ==
=== Regular season and playoffs ===
			Regular season					Playoffs
Season	Team	League	GP	G	A	Pts	PIM	GP	G	A	Pts	PIM
1982–83	Abbotsford Flyers	BCJHL	48	50	73	123	113	—	—	—	—	—
1983–84	University of Denver	WCHA	36	24	27	51	48	—	—	—	—	—
1984–85	University of Denver	WCHA	39	26	32	58	64	—	—	—	—	—
1985–86	University of Denver	WCHA	48	40	49	89	48	—	—	—	—	—
1985–86	Pittsburgh Penguins	NHL	4	1	0	1	2	—	—	—	—	—
1986–87	Baltimore Skipjacks	AHL	61	23	22	45	49	—	—	—	—	—
1986–87	Pittsburgh Penguins	NHL	6	0	1	1	2	—	—	—	—	—
1987–88	Pittsburgh Penguins	NHL	23	0	6	6	14	—	—	—	—	—
1987–88	Muskegon Lumberjacks	IHL	46	19	42	61	35	4	1	2	3	9
1994–95	Fresno Falcons	PHL	—	—	—	—	—	—	—	—	—	—
1994–95	Fresno Falcons	SuHL	12	8	10	18	14	—	—	—	—	—
1995–96	Fresno Falcons	WCHL	2	0	0	0	2	—	—	—	—	—
NHL totals			33	1	7	8	18	—	—	—	—	—

== Awards and honors ==
Award	Year
All-WCHA Second team	1985–86
AHCA West Second-Team All-American	1985–86

== Transactions ==
- March 31, 1986 – Signed as a free agent by Pittsburgh.
