= Pat Micheletti =

American ice hockey player

- Born: December 11, 1963 (age 62) Hibbing, Minnesota, U.S.
- Height: 5 ft 10 in (178 cm)
- Weight: 175 lb (79 kg; 12 st 7 lb)
- Position: Center
- Shot: Left
- Played for: Minnesota North Stars; HC Varese; HC Asiago
- NHL draft: 185th overall, 1982; Minnesota North Stars
- Playing career: 1986–1992

Patrick John Micheletti (born December 11, 1963) is an American former ice hockey center who played 12 games in the National Hockey League with the Minnesota North Stars during the 1987–88 season. The rest of his career, which lasted from 1986 to 1992, was mainly spent in the Italian Serie A. The North Stars selected Micheletti with the 185th overall pick in the 1982 NHL entry draft. He also played for the Minnesota Golden Gophers men's ice hockey team. One of nine children, Pat Micheletti's brother Joe Micheletti also played in the NHL.

== Career statistics ==
=== Regular season and playoffs ===
			Regular season					Playoffs
Season	Team	League	GP	G	A	Pts	PIM	GP	G	A	Pts	PIM
1980–81	Hibbing High School	HS-MN	—	—	—	—	—	—	—	—	—	—
1981–82	Hibbing High School	HS-MN	22	26	39	65	50	—	—	—	—	—
1982–83	University of Minnesota	WCHA	31	14	19	33	74	—	—	—	—	—
1983–84	University of Minnesota	WCHA	39	26	34	60	62	—	—	—	—	—
1984–85	University of Minnesota	WCHA	44	48	48	96	154	—	—	—	—	—
1985–86	University of Minnesota	WCHA	48	32	48	80	113	—	—	—	—	—
1985–86	Springfield Indians	AHL	2	1	0	1	0	—	—	—	—	—
1986–87	Springfield Indians	AHL	67	17	26	43	39	—	—	—	—	—
1987–88	Kalamazoo Wings	IHL	19	12	6	18	12	7	2	2	4	0
1987–88	Minnesota North Stars	NHL	12	2	0	2	8	—	—	—	—	—
1988–89	HC Varese	ITA	46	48	50	98	105	—	—	—	—	—
1989–90	HC Varese	ITA	39	46	35	81	72	—	—	—	—	—
1990–91	HC Varese	ITA	36	34	58	92	22	9	8	7	15	26
1991–92	HC Asiago	ITA	9	4	12	16	16	10	2	3	5	26
1991–92	HC Asiago	ALP	18	24	23	47	67	—	—	—	—	—
ITA totals			130	132	155	287	215	19	10	10	20	52
NHL totals			12	2	0	2	8	—	—	—	—	—

== Awards and honors ==
Award	Year
All-WCHA First Team	1984–85
AHCA West First-Team All-American	1984–85
All-WCHA Second Team	1985–86
