= Clark Donatelli =

American ice hockey player and coach

- Born: November 22, 1965 (age 60) Providence, Rhode Island, U.S.
- Height: 5 ft 10 in (178 cm)
- Weight: 185 lb (84 kg; 13 st 3 lb)
- Position: Left wing
- Shot: Left
- Played for: Minnesota North Stars; Boston Bruins
- National team: United States
- NHL draft: 98th overall, 1984; New York Rangers
- Playing career: 1989–1996

John Clark Donatelli (born November 22, 1965) is an American former professional ice hockey player and hockey coach. Donatelli was a long-time minor league player in the American Hockey League (AHL) and International Hockey League (IHL). He played 35 games in the National Hockey League (NHL). Internationally Donatelli played for the American national team at several World Championships, the 1988 and 1992 Winter Olympics.

== Playing career ==
Donatelli was drafted in the fifth round, 98th overall, in the 1984 NHL entry draft by the New York Rangers. After three seasons with Boston University and one with the U.S. national team, Donatelli made his NHL debut with the Minnesota North Stars during the 1989–90 season.

Donatelli played a full season with the International Hockey League's San Diego Gulls in 1990–91, and joined the NHL's Boston Bruins briefly in the 1991–92 season. After several seasons in the IHL and American Hockey League, as well as one in Roller Hockey International with the San Diego Barracudas, Donatelli retired in 1996.

== Coaching career ==
After retiring, Donatelli took up coaching and eventually was named head coach of the Wheeling Nailers in the ECHL during the 2011–12 season. During the 2015–16 season, the Nailers' American Hockey League affiliate Wilkes-Barre/Scranton Penguins promoted him as the interim head coach as their head coach, Mike Sullivan, had been promoted to Pittsburgh Penguins. He became the permanent head coach of the WBS Penguins after the season ended. Donatelli had a record of 154–94–20–9 with Wilkes-Barre/Scranton, leading the Penguins to three Calder Cup Playoff appearances and a regular season title in 2016–17 before he departed in 2019.

In a lawsuit filed on November 3, 2020, in Pennsylvania, Wilkes-Barre/Scranton Penguins assistant coach Jarrod Skalde filed a lawsuit alleging his wife was the victim of sexual assault by Donatelli. The lawsuit, Skalde et al. v. Lemieux Group, L.P. et al., alleges that Guerin, then the general manager of the Wilkes-Barre/Scranton Penguins, "told Skalde to keep quiet about the alleged assault." Guerin denied any wrongdoing on his part, claiming that he had "promptly brought (the allegation) to Pittsburgh Penguins senior management". The lawsuit was settled in November 2021.

== Career statistics ==
=== Regular season and playoffs ===
			Regular season					Playoffs
Season	Team	League	GP	G	A	Pts	PIM	GP	G	A	Pts	PIM
1980–81	Moses Brown School	HSRI	—	—	—	—	—	—	—	—	—	—
1981–82	Moses Brown School	HSRI	—	—	—	—	—	—	—	—	—	—
1982–83	Moses Brown School	HSRI	—	—	—	—	—	—	—	—	—	—
1983–84	Stratford Cullitons	MWJHL	38	41	49	90	46	—	—	—	—	—
1984–85	Boston University	HE	40	17	18	35	46	—	—	—	—	—
1985–86	Boston University	HE	43	28	34	62	30	—	—	—	—	—
1986–87	Boston University	HE	37	15	23	38	46	—	—	—	—	—
1987–88	United States National Team	Intl	50	11	27	38	26	—	—	—	—	—
1989–90	Kalamazoo Wings	IHL	27	8	9	17	47	4	0	2	2	12
1989–90	Minnesota North Stars	NHL	25	3	3	6	17	—	—	—	—	—
1990–91	San Diego Gulls	IHL	46	17	10	27	45	—	—	—	—	—
1991–92	United States National Team	Intl	42	13	25	38	50	—	—	—	—	—
1991–92	Boston Bruins	NHL	10	0	1	1	22	2	0	0	0	0
1992–93	Providence Bruins	AHL	57	12	14	26	40	4	2	1	3	2
1993–94	San Diego Gulls	IHL	50	11	32	43	54	9	0	1	1	23
1994–95	San Diego Gulls	IHL	70	22	25	47	48	5	0	1	1	6
1995–96	Los Angeles Ice Dogs	IHL	22	1	3	4	12	—	—	—	—	—
1995–96	Detroit Vipers	IHL	36	0	12	12	40	11	0	2	2	2
IHL totals			251	59	91	150	246	29	0	6	6	43
NHL totals			35	3	4	7	39	2	0	0	0	0

=== International ===
Year	Team	Event	GP	G	A	Pts	PIM
1984	United States	WJC	7	1	2	3	6
1985	United States	WJC	7	2	3	5	12
1985	United States	WC	10	3	1	4	12
1986	United States	WC	10	3	3	6	8
1987	United States	WC	9	1	2	3	6
1988	United States	OLY	6	1	2	3	6
1992	United States	OLY	8	2	1	3	6
Junior totals			14	3	5	8	18
Senior totals			43	10	9	19	38

== Awards and honors ==
Award	Year
All-Hockey East Rookie Team	1984–85
Hockey East All-Tournament Team	1985
All-Hockey East Second team	1985–86
AHCA East Second-Team All-American	1985–86
