= Kevin Miller (ice hockey) =

American ice hockey player (born 1965)

- Born: September 2, 1965 (age 61) Lansing, Michigan, U.S.
- Height: 5 ft 11 in (180 cm)
- Weight: 190 lb (86 kg; 13 st 8 lb)
- Position: Centre
- Shot: Right
- Played for: New York Rangers; Detroit Red Wings; Washington Capitals; St. Louis Blues; San Jose Sharks; Pittsburgh Penguins; Chicago Blackhawks; New York Islanders; Ottawa Senators
- National team: United States
- NHL draft: 202nd overall, 1984; New York Rangers
- Playing career: 1988–2005

Kevin Bradley Miller (born September 2, 1965) is an American former professional ice hockey player.

== Early life ==
Miller was born in Lansing, Michigan. As a youth, he played in the 1978 Quebec International Pee-Wee Hockey Tournament with the Detroit Little Caesars minor ice hockey team.

== Career ==
A two-way forward, Miller was drafted by the New York Rangers in 1984. He would also go on to play with the Detroit Red Wings, Washington Capitals, St. Louis Blues, San Jose Sharks, Pittsburgh Penguins, Chicago Blackhawks, New York Islanders and Ottawa Senators.

After playing for the Senators during the 1999–2000 NHL season, Miller spent several years in Switzerland before returning to play in North America and would play several games for the Red Wings in 2003–04. Miller retired from active professional play in 2005.

=== Andrew McKim incident ===
On June 5, 2014, U.S. District Judge Gordon Jay Quist ruled against Miller for a hit from behind during an October 31, 2000, Swiss league game that ended Andrew McKim's career. After the collision, McKim was hospitalized for weeks with a concussion and a sprain of the cervical spine and never returned to the ice. Miller was charged and convicted of simple bodily harm, intentional bodily harm and gross negligence in Switzerland's Canton of Zürich in 2004. The insurance company asked the U.S. court to recognize a Swiss court's $1.1 million judgement against Miller, which increased to $1.6 million with interest and costs. Miller previously refused to pay the Swiss court's judgment, however Judge Gordon Quist said in its ruling that his court was adhering to the Uniform Foreign-Country Judgments Recognition Act, and ordered Miller to pay the $1.6 million judgement.

== Personal life ==
He is one of the three Miller brothers, along with Kelly and Kip, who played in the NHL. He is also a cousin of former NHL goaltender Ryan Miller and Ryan's brother Drew Miller who also played in the NHL. He is the father of figure skater Hannah Miller.

== Career statistics ==
=== Regular season and playoffs ===
| | | | Regular season | | | | | Playoffs |
| Season | Team | League | GP | G | A | Pts | PIM | GP | G | A | Pts | PIM |
|---|---|---|---|---|---|---|---|---|---|---|---|---|
| 1983–84 | Redford Royals | GLJHL | 44 | 28 | 57 | 85 | — | — | — | — | — | — |
| 1984–85 | Michigan State University | CCHA | 44 | 11 | 29 | 40 | 84 | — | — | — | — | — |
| 1985–86 | Michigan State University | CCHA | 45 | 19 | 52 | 71 | 112 | — | — | — | — | — |
| 1986–87 | Michigan State University | CCHA | 45 | 25 | 56 | 81 | 63 | — | — | — | — | — |
| 1987–88 | Michigan State University | CCHA | 9 | 6 | 3 | 9 | 18 | — | — | — | — | — |
| 1987–88 | United States | Intl | 48 | 31 | 32 | 63 | 33 | — | — | — | — | — |
| 1989–90 | Flint Spirits | IHL | 48 | 10 | 22 | 32 | 20 | — | — | — | — | — |
| 1990–91 | New York Rangers | NHL | 63 | 17 | 27 | 44 | 63 | — | — | — | — | — |
| 1990–91 | Detroit Red Wings | NHL | 11 | 5 | 2 | 7 | 4 | 7 | 3 | 2 | 5 | 20 |
| 1991–92 | Detroit Red Wings | NHL | 80 | 20 | 26 | 46 | 53 | 9 | 0 | 2 | 2 | 4 |
| 1992–93 | Washington Capitals | NHL | 10 | 0 | 3 | 3 | 35 | — | — | — | — | — |
| 1992–93 | St. Louis Blues | NHL | 72 | 24 | 22 | 46 | 65 | 10 | 0 | 3 | 3 | 11 |
| 1993–94 | St. Louis Blues | NHL | 75 | 23 | 25 | 48 | 83 | 3 | 1 | 0 | 1 | 4 |
| 1994–95 | St. Louis Blues | NHL | 15 | 2 | 5 | 7 | 0 | — | — | — | — | — |
| 1994–95 | San Jose Sharks | NHL | 21 | 6 | 7 | 13 | 13 | 6 | 0 | 0 | 0 | 2 |
| 1995–96 | San Jose Sharks | NHL | 68 | 22 | 20 | 42 | 41 | — | — | — | — | — |
| 1995–96 | Pittsburgh Penguins | NHL | 13 | 6 | 5 | 11 | 4 | 18 | 3 | 2 | 5 | 8 |
| 1996–97 | Chicago Blackhawks | NHL | 69 | 14 | 17 | 31 | 41 | 6 | 0 | 1 | 1 | 0 |
| 1997–98 | Indianapolis Ice | IHL | 26 | 11 | 11 | 22 | 41 | 2 | 1 | 1 | 2 | 0 |
| 1997–98 | Chicago Blackhawks | NHL | 37 | 4 | 7 | 11 | 8 | — | — | — | — | — |
| 1998–99 | New York Islanders | NHL | 33 | 1 | 5 | 6 | 13 | — | — | — | — | — |
| 1998–99 | Chicago Wolves | IHL | 30 | 11 | 20 | 31 | 8 | 10 | 2 | 7 | 9 | 22 |
| 1999–2000 | Ottawa Senators | NHL | 9 | 3 | 2 | 5 | 2 | 1 | 0 | 0 | 0 | 0 |
| 1999–2000 | Grand Rapids Griffins | IHL | 63 | 20 | 34 | 54 | 51 | 17 | 11 | 7 | 18 | 30 |
| 2000–01 | HC Davos | NLA | 36 | 29 | 27 | 56 | 61 | 4 | 3 | 0 | 3 | 2 |
| 2001–02 | HC Davos | NLA | 43 | 24 | 18 | 42 | 60 | — | — | — | — | — |
| 2002–03 | HC Davos | NLA | 44 | 14 | 24 | 38 | 38 | — | — | — | — | — |
| 2003–04 | Detroit Red Wings | NHL | 4 | 0 | 2 | 2 | 0 | — | — | — | — | — |
| 2003–04 | Grand Rapids Griffins | AHL | 74 | 27 | 21 | 48 | 22 | 4 | 3 | 0 | 3 | 5 |
| 2004–05 | Flint Generals | UHL | 7 | 1 | 4 | 5 | 10 | — | — | — | — | — |
| NHL totals | | | 620 | 150 | 185 | 335 | 429 | 61 | 7 | 10 | 17 | 49 |

=== International ===
| Year | Team | Event | GP | G | A | Pts | PIM |
|---|---|---|---|---|---|---|---|
| 1988 | United States | OG | 5 | 1 | 3 | 4 | 4 |
| 1991 | United States | WC | 9 | 3 | 5 | 8 | 10 |
| 1991 | United States | CC | 8 | 2 | 3 | 5 | 16 |
| 1998 | United States | WC | 5 | 0 | 1 | 1 | 29 |
| 2003 | United States | WC | 6 | 0 | 2 | 2 | 4 |
| Senior totals | | | 33 | 6 | 14 | 20 | 63 |

== See also ==
- Notable families in the NHL
