= Donald McSween =

American ice hockey player (born 1964)

- Born: June 9, 1964 (age 61) Detroit, Michigan, U.S.
- Height: 5 ft 11 in (180 cm)
- Weight: 197 lb (89 kg; 14 st 1 lb)
- Position: Defense
- Shot: Left
- Played for: Buffalo Sabres; Mighty Ducks of Anaheim
- National team: United States
- NHL draft: 84th overall, 1983; Buffalo Sabres
- Playing career: 1987–2002

Donald Kennedy McSween (born June 9, 1964) is an American former professional ice hockey player who played in the National Hockey League (NHL) for two clubs in the late 1980s and early 1990s.

== Playing career ==
A defenseman known for his adept puck-handling skills as well as his quick mobility, McSween, a two-time All American, was successful during his college career at Michigan State University, leading the team to the NCAA Division I Men's Ice Hockey National Championship in 1986.

He was quite successful while playing in the minor league. Following his impressive college career, McSween went on to play for the Buffalo Sabres (NHL). He was selected 84th in the 1983 NHL Draft, with a height of 5'11" a weight of 197 lb, and shooting left. After this stint, he played for the Rochester Americans (AHL), and the San Diego Gulls (IHL). In fact, McSween continues to hold American records for points scored by a defenseman in a career: 215 goals. In 1989–90 McSween was selected as an AHL First-Team All-Star. McSween also won myriad awards playing as a member of the Americans. He won five straight team Defensive Player of the Year awards (1987–92).

He also had a short but notable career as a player for the Mighty Ducks of Anaheim. However, his chances of becoming a prominent National Hockey League player were severed after a serious arm injury in January 1995 at Winnipeg, when involved in a fight with another player, Keith Tkachuk. The tendons in McSween's left wrist were severely damaged after being severed by Tkachuk's skate. The nerve and tendon injury never fully healed, preventing him from being able to fully close his left hand, his shooting arm, effectively ending McSween's professional career. Ironically, McSween had severed the Achilles tendon of another promising player, Teemu Selänne, earlier in his career (Selänne would go on to make a full recovery, playing for 2 decades). After his injury McSween went on to play in the AHL (American Hockey League) for the Baltimore Bandits; in the IHL (International Hockey League) for the Grand Rapids Griffins and later Milwaukee Admirals; and in the UHL (United Hockey League) for the Muskegon Fury.

== Personal life ==
McSween lives in Grand Rapids, Michigan, working as an electrical engineer and a volunteer coach for local Youth Hockey Leagues. He is raising two boys and a daughter with his wife. As a youth, he played in the 1977 Quebec International Pee-Wee Hockey Tournament with a minor ice hockey team from Detroit.

== Career statistics ==
=== Regular season and playoffs ===
			Regular season					Playoffs
Season	Team	League	GP	G	A	Pts	PIM	GP	G	A	Pts	PIM
1980–81	Little Caesars U18 AAA	U18 AAA	—	—	—	—	—	—	—	—	—	—
1981–82	Redford Royals	GLJHL	—	—	—	—	—	—	—	—	—	—
1982–83	Redford Royals	GLJHL	37	9	33	42	—	—	—	—	—	—
1983–84	Michigan State University	CCHA	46	10	26	36	30	—	—	—	—	—
1984–85	Michigan State University	CCHA	44	2	23	25	50	—	—	—	—	—
1985–86	Michigan State University	CCHA	45	9	29	38	18	—	—	—	—	—
1986–87	Michigan State University	CCHA	45	7	23	30	34	—	—	—	—	—
1987–88	Buffalo Sabres	NHL	5	0	1	1	6	—	—	—	—	—
1987–88	Rochester Americans	AHL	63	9	29	38	108	6	0	1	1	15
1988–89	Rochester Americans	AHL	66	7	22	29	45	—	—	—	—	—
1989–90	Buffalo Sabres	NHL	4	0	0	0	6	—	—	—	—	—
1989–90	Rochester Americans	AHL	70	16	43	59	43	17	3	10	13	12
1990–91	Rochester Americans	AHL	74	7	44	51	57	15	2	5	7	8
1991–92	Rochester Americans	AHL	75	6	32	38	60	16	5	6	11	18
1992–93	San Diego Gulls	IHL	80	15	40	55	85	14	1	2	3	10
1993–94	Mighty Ducks of Anaheim	NHL	32	3	9	12	39	—	—	—	—	—
1993–94	San Diego Gulls	IHL	38	5	13	18	36	—	—	—	—	—
1994–95	Mighty Ducks of Anaheim	NHL	2	0	0	0	0	—	—	—	—	—
1995–96	Mighty Ducks of Anaheim	NHL	4	0	0	0	4	—	—	—	—	—
1995–96	Baltimore Bandits	AHL	12	1	9	10	2	—	—	—	—	—
1996–97	Grand Rapids Griffins	IHL	75	7	20	27	66	3	0	1	1	8
1997–98	Grand Rapids Griffins	IHL	2	0	0	0	4	—	—	—	—	—
1997–98	Milwaukee Admirals	IHL	76	4	21	25	128	10	0	0	0	14
1998–99	Muskegon Fury	UHL	6	0	3	3	4	8	2	2	4	10
1999–00	Muskegon Fury	UHL	6	1	3	4	5	—	—	—	—	—
2001–02	Muskegon Fury	UHL	3	0	0	0	0	—	—	—	—	—
AHL totals			360	46	179	225	315	54	10	22	32	53
IHL totals			271	31	94	125	319	27	1	3	4	32
NHL totals			47	3	10	13	55	—	—	—	—	—

=== International ===
Year	Team	Event	GP	G	A	Pts	PIM
1994	United States	WC	8	1	1	2	0
Senior totals			8	1	1	2	0

== Awards and honors ==
Award	Year
All-CCHA First Team	1984–85
CCHA All-Tournament Team	1985
All-CCHA First Team	1985–86
AHCA West Second-Team All-American	1985–86
All-NCAA All-Tournament Team	1986
All-CCHA First Team	1986–87
AHCA West Second-Team All-American	1986–87
CCHA All-Tournament Team	1987
All-NCAA All-Tournament Team	1987
