= 1986 WCHA men's ice hockey tournament =

Ice hockey tournament

1986 WCHA Men's ice hockey tournament
- Dates: February 28-March 15, 1986
- Teams: 8
- Finals site: DU Arena; Denver, Colorado
- Champions: Denver (11th title)
- Winning coach: Ralph Backstrom (1st title)
- WCHA Men's Ice Hockey Tournaments

The 1986 WCHA Men's Ice Hockey Tournament was the 27th conference playoff in league history and 34th season where a WCHA champion was crowned. The tournament was played between February 28 and March 15, 1986. First round and semifinal games were played at home team campus sites while the championship match was held at the DU Arena in Denver, Colorado. By winning the tournament, Denver was awarded the Broadmoor Trophy and received the WCHA's automatic bid to the 1986 NCAA Division I Men's Ice Hockey Tournament.

== Format ==
All member teams were eligible for the tournament and were seeded No. 1 through No. 8 according to their final conference standing, with a tiebreaker system used to seed teams with an identical number of points accumulated. The top four seeded teams each earned home ice and hosted one of the lower seeded teams. As a result of their being the regular season champion, Denver's home venue, DU Arena, served as the site for the Championship game regardless of which teams qualified for the penultimate match. Each series were two-game matchups with the team that scored the most goals advancing to the succeeding round. The teams that advanced to the semifinal were re-seeded No. 1 through No. 4 according to the final regular season conference standings, with the top remaining seed matched against lowest remaining seed in one semifinal game while the two other semifinalists meeting with the winners advancing to the championship round. The Tournament Champion received an automatic bid to the 1986 NCAA Division I Men's Ice Hockey Tournament.

=== Conference standings ===
Note: GP = Games played; W = Wins; L = Losses; T = Ties; PTS = Points; GF = Goals For; GA = Goals Against

1985–86 Western Collegiate Hockey Association standings
	Conference							Overall					
	GP	W	L	T	PTS	GF	GA	GP	W	L	T	GF	GA
Denver†*	34	25	9	0	50	169	115	48	34	13	1	236	158
Minnesota	34	24	10	0	48	177	115	48	35	13	0	252	157
Wisconsin	34	23	11	0	46	172	136	42	27	15	0	206	173
Minnesota-Duluth	34	21	12	1	43	153	117	42	26	13	3	206	157
Northern Michigan	34	21	13	0	42	168	151	39	23	14	2	191	169
North Dakota	34	19	14	1	39	155	136	41	24	16	1	188	156
Colorado College	34	11	21	2	24	131	155	40	12	26	2	158	191
Michigan Tech	34	9	22	3	21	118	164	40	10	26	4	136	205
Championship: Denver † indicates conference regular season champion * indicates conference tournament champion

== Bracket ==
Teams are reseeded after the first round

First Round; February 28-March 1
1	Denver	3	6	9
8	Michigan Tech	4	2	6
2	Minnesota	10	4	14
7	Colorado College	4	3	7
3	Wisconsin	6	6	12
6	North Dakota	2	5	7
4	Minnesota-Duluth	4	8	12
5	Northern Michigan	4	4	8

Semifinals; March 7–9
1	Denver	8	5	13
4	Minnesota-Duluth	2	5	7
2	Minnesota	4	7	11
3	Wisconsin	1	3	4

Championship; March 14–15
1	Denver	3	3	6
2	Minnesota	0	2	2

Note: * denotes overtime period(s)

=== First round ===
==== (1) Denver vs. (8) Michigan Tech ====
February 28	Denver	3 – 4	Michigan Tech	DU Arena

March 1	Denver	6 – 2	Michigan Tech	DU Arena

Denver won series 9–6

==== (2) Minnesota vs. (7) Colorado College ====
February 28	Minnesota	10 – 4	Colorado College	Mariucci Arena

March 1	Minnesota	4 – 3	Colorado College	Mariucci Arena

Minnesota won series 14–7

==== (3) Wisconsin vs. (6) North Dakota ====
February 28	Wisconsin	6 – 2	North Dakota	Dane County Coliseum

March 1	Wisconsin	6 – 5	North Dakota	Dane County Coliseum

Wisconsin won series 12–7

==== (4) Minnesota-Duluth vs. (5) Northern Michigan ====
February 28	Minnesota-Duluth	4 – 4	Northern Michigan	Duluth Arena Auditorium

March 1	Minnesota-Duluth	8 – 4	Northern Michigan	Duluth Arena Auditorium

Minnesota-Duluth won series 12–8

=== Semifinals ===
==== (1) Denver vs. (4) Minnesota-Duluth ====
March 7	Denver	8 – 2	Minnesota-Duluth	DU Arena

March 8	Denver	5 – 5	Minnesota-Duluth	DU Arena

Denver won series 13–7

==== (2) Minnesota vs. (3) Wisconsin ====
March 8	Minnesota	4 – 1	Wisconsin	Mariucci Arena

March 9	Minnesota	7 – 3	Wisconsin	Mariucci Arena

Minnesota won series 11–4

=== Championship ===
==== (1) Denver vs. (2) Minnesota ====
March 14	Denver	3 – 0	Minnesota	DU Arena

March 15	Denver	3 – 2	Minnesota	DU Arena

Denver won series 6–2

== Tournament awards ==
None

== See also ==
- Western Collegiate Hockey Association men's champions
