= Don Gibson (ice hockey) =

Canadian ice hockey player

- Born: March 17, 1967 (age 59) Deloraine, Manitoba, Canada
- Height: 6 ft 1 in (185 cm)
- Weight: 210 lb (95 kg; 15 st 0 lb)
- Position: Defence
- Shot: Right
- Played for: Vancouver Canucks (NHL); Milwaukee Admirals (IHL)
- NHL draft: 49th overall, 1986; Vancouver Canucks
- Playing career: 1990–1994

Donald Gibson (born March 17, 1967) is a Canadian retired professional ice hockey player. He played in 14 games with the Vancouver Canucks during the 1990–91 NHL season.

Gibson was born in Deloraine, Manitoba. He played junior hockey with the Winkler Flyers in 1985–86 and was drafted by the Canucks in the 1986 NHL entry draft. Gibson went to college at Michigan State University where he played for the Spartans. He became a professional after his graduation in 1990, playing for the Canucks' minor league affiliate Milwaukee Admirals. Gibson would play until 1994 with the Admirals, except for 14 games played with the Canuck in 1990–91.

== Career statistics ==
=== Regular season and playoffs ===
			Regular season					Playoffs
Season	Team	League	GP	G	A	Pts	PIM	GP	G	A	Pts	PIM
1985–86	Winkler Flyers	MJHL	34	24	29	53	210	—	—	—	—	—
1986–87	Michigan State Spartans	CCHA	43	3	3	6	74	—	—	—	—	—
1987–88	Michigan State Spartans	CCHA	43	7	12	19	118	—	—	—	—	—
1988–89	Michigan State Spartans	CCHA	39	7	10	17	107	—	—	—	—	—
1989–90	Michigan State Spartans	CCHA	44	5	22	27	167	—	—	—	—	—
1989–90	Milwaukee Admirals	IHL	1	0	0	0	4	5	0	1	1	41
1990–91	Vancouver Canucks	NHL	14	0	3	3	20	—	—	—	—	—
1990–91	Milwaukee Admirals	IHL	21	4	3	7	76	—	—	—	—	—
1991–92	Milwaukee Admirals	IHL	35	6	9	15	105	4	1	0	1	7
1992–93	Milwaukee Admirals	IHL	68	3	14	17	381	6	0	1	1	11
1993–94	Milwaukee Admirals	IHL	43	4	6	10	233	3	0	0	0	10
NHL totals			14	0	3	3	20	—	—	—	—	—
IHL totals			168	17	32	49	799	18	1	2	3	69

- All statistics are taken from NHL.com.

== Awards and honours ==
Award	Year
All-CCHA Second Team	1989-90
