= Bob Essensa =

Canadian ice hockey player, coach (born 1965)

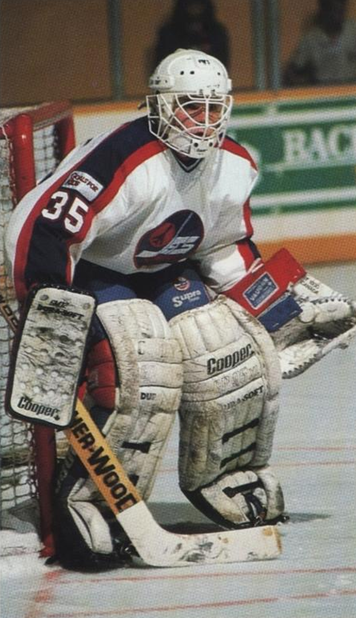
- Essensa with the Winnipeg Jets in 1988
- Born: January 14, 1965 (age 61) Toronto, Ontario, Canada
- Height: 6 ft 0 in (183 cm)
- Weight: 185 lb (84 kg; 13 st 3 lb)
- Position: Goaltender
- Caught: Left
- Played for: Winnipeg Jets; Detroit Red Wings; Edmonton Oilers; Phoenix Coyotes; Vancouver Canucks; Buffalo Sabres
- National team: Canada
- NHL draft: 69th overall, 1983; Winnipeg Jets
- Playing career: 1987–2002
- Coaching career: 2003–present

Robert Earle Essensa (born January 14, 1965) is a Canadian ice hockey coach and former goaltender who played 12 seasons in the National Hockey League (NHL). Since 2003, he has served as the goaltending coach for the Boston Bruins.

== Playing career ==
As a youth, Essensa played in the 1978 Quebec International Pee-Wee Hockey Tournament with the Toronto Shopsy's minor ice hockey team.

=== Junior 'B' career ===
Essensa was the number one goaltender for the 1982-83 Henry Carr Crusaders Metro Junior 'B' Championship team which never lost a game in regular season play (34 wins, 0 losses, 2 ties) and only two playoff games - one in the Ontario Hockey Association's Semi-finals against the Streetsville Derbys. The Crusaders went on to capture the Ontario Hockey Association's Junior 'B' Championship and along with it, the Sutherland Cup, after defeating the Stratford Cullitons in the final. (Following five rounds of playoffs, what it took to win the Sutherland Cup, the Crusaders had accumulated 54 wins, 2 losses, 2 ties, and 2 losses in overtime in 60 regulation games.)

He was also MVP of the league's mid-season all-star game held in Trenton, Ontario, Canada as the best of the Fullan Division defeated the stars of the Ruddock Division, 3-1.

=== College career ===
Essensa was selected in the fourth round of the 1983 NHL entry draft, 69th overall, by the Winnipeg Jets after dominating Junior B hockey in the Toronto area.

Following the 1983 Draft, Essensa played for Michigan State University and posted an overall record of 62–13–2 in his four years at Michigan State. He was named the CCHA First Team All-Star his sophomore year and won the CCHA and NCAA Championships with Michigan State in his Junior year. He graduated as the school's all-time leader in GAA and shutouts, although both records have since been broken.

=== Professional career ===
After spending his first professional season entirely in the AHL, Essensa made his NHL debut during the 1988–89 season, and posted a 6–8–3 record in 20 games. His workload increased to 36 games in 1989–90, and he took over as Winnipeg's starting goaltender the following season. For four seasons, he was a workhorse for the Jets, averaging nearly 60 games per year.

Essensa and the Jets suffered through a dismal 1993–94 campaign, struggling to the second-worst record in the league next to the expansion Ottawa Senators. However, he was dealt to the Detroit Red Wings at the trade deadline. A legitimate contender for the Stanley Cup, Detroit had been let down in previous seasons by poor goaltending and Essensa, just two years removed from his Vezina nomination and a college star in the area at Michigan State, was considered an ideal solution. However, it proved to be a disaster as he posted a 4–7–1 record down the stretch and struggled in the playoffs, ultimately being usurped by rookie Chris Osgood.

Things went from bad to worse for Essensa in 1994–95, as Detroit acquired star veteran Mike Vernon to partner Osgood. Exiled to the minors, he spent the next two seasons in the International Hockey League.

Essensa was dealt to the Edmonton Oilers for the 1996–97 season. He spent the next two seasons backing up Curtis Joseph for the Oilers, and although his workload was limited behind one of the top goaltenders in the league, he re-established himself as a solid NHL goaltender and an above-average backup. When Joseph left Edmonton as a free agent in 1998, Essensa's responsibilities increased, as he split the goaltending duties evenly in 1998–99 with the newly acquired Mikhail Shtalenkov. While neither goaltender performed poorly, it represented a significant drop-off from Joseph and the team eventually acquired Tommy Salo late in the season to take over as the starter.

For 1999–2000, Essensa signed with the Phoenix Coyotes. The move represented a homecoming of sorts, as the Winnipeg Jets had moved to Phoenix in 1996, and gave him an opportunity to extend his franchise records for games played and wins by a goalie. Shtalenkov was dealt mid-season in a deal for Sean Burke, and Essensa finished the season as Burke's backup, posting a solid 13–10–3 record in 30 games.

Essensa was on the move again for the 2000–01 campaign, this time signing with the Vancouver Canucks to back up Félix Potvin. Ultimately, Potvin was shipped out of Vancouver and replaced by Dan Cloutier, and Essensa and Cloutier split the goaltending duties as the Canucks were knocked out of the playoffs by the Colorado Avalanche. Essensa finished the year with an 18–12–3 mark in 39 appearances, his highest win total since 1994.

After Vancouver failed to give him a serious contract offer, Essensa signed with the Buffalo Sabres for the 2001–02 season. However, he was unable to recapture his heroics of the previous year, posting an 0–5 record in 9 appearances for the Sabres before retiring at the conclusion of the season.

Essensa finished his career with a 173–176–47 record in 446 career NHL appearances, along with 18 shutouts and a 3.15 GAA.

== Coaching career ==
Essensa has served as the goaltending coach for the Boston Bruins since 2003, and got his name on the Stanley Cup with the Bruins Stanley Cup Championship in 2011. He also assists with coaching the goaltenders of the Providence Bruins, Boston's minor league affiliate in the American Hockey League.

On March 28, 2015, Essensa, at age 50, was dressed as a backup goalie for the Bruins during their game against the New York Rangers after Tuukka Rask left the game in the second period due to suspected dehydration.

== Personal ==
Essensa and his wife Jeanine have three sons, Josh, Ben and Jake. They make their home in Oxford, Michigan, a northern suburb of Detroit. After the Bruins championship in 2011, Essensa brought the Stanley Cup to local establishments in Oxford, Lake Orion, and Clarkston.

All three sons are active in Detroit-area youth hockey.

== Career statistics ==
=== Regular season and playoffs ===
			Regular season									Playoffs
Season	Team	League	GP	W	L	T	MIN	GA	SO	GAA	SV%	GP	W	L	MIN	GA	SO	GAA	SV%
1980–81	Markham Waxers	OPJHL	—	—	—	—	—	—	—	—	—	—	—	—	—	—	—	—
1981–82	Henry Carr Crusaders	MetJHL	17	—	—	—	948	79	—	3.80	—	—	—	—	—	—	—	—	—
1982–83	Henry Carr Crusaders	MetJHL	31	—	—	—	1840	98	2	3.20	—	—	—	—	—	—	—	—	—
1983–84	Michigan State Spartans	CCHA	17	11	4	0	947	44	2	2.79	—	—	—	—	—	—	—	—	—
1984–85	Michigan State Spartans	CCHA	18	15	2	0	1059	29	2	1.64	—	—	—	—	—	—	—	—	—
1985–86	Michigan State Spartans	CCHA	23	17	4	1	1333	74	1	3.33	—	—	—	—	—	—	—	—	—
1986–87	Michigan State Spartans	CCHA	25	19	3	1	1383	64	2	2.78	—	—	—	—	—	—	—	—	—
1987–88	Moncton Hawks	AHL	27	7	11	1	1287	100	1	4.66	.863	—	—	—	—	—	—	—	—
1988–89	Winnipeg Jets	NHL	20	6	8	3	1102	68	1	3.70	.882	—	—	—	—	—	—	—	—
1988–89	Fort Wayne Komets	IHL	22	14	7	0	1287	70	0	3.26	—	—	—	—	—	—	—	—	—
1989–90	Moncton Hawks	AHL	6	3	3	0	358	15	0	2.51	.917	—	—	—	—	—	—	—	—
1989–90	Winnipeg Jets	NHL	36	18	9	5	2035	107	1	3.15	.892	4	2	1	206	12	0	3.50	.880
1990–91	Moncton Hawks	AHL	2	1	0	1	125	6	0	2.88	.889	—	—	—	—	—	—	—	—
1990–91	Winnipeg Jets	NHL	55	19	24	6	2916	153	4	3.15	.898	—	—	—	—	—	—	—	—
1991–92	Winnipeg Jets	NHL	47	21	17	6	2627	126	5	2.88	.910	1	0	0	33	3	0	5.45	.824
1992–93	Winnipeg Jets	NHL	67	33	26	6	3855	227	2	3.53	.893	6	2	4	367	20	0	3.27	.891
1993–94	Winnipeg Jets	NHL	56	19	30	6	3136	201	1	3.85	.883	—	—	—	—	—	—	—	—
1993–94	Detroit Red Wings	NHL	13	4	7	2	777	34	1	2.63	.899	2	0	2	109	9	0	4.95	.791
1994–95	San Diego Gulls	IHL	16	6	8	1	919	52	0	3.39	.900	1	0	1	59	3	0	3.05	—
1995–96	Fort Wayne Komets	IHL	45	24	14	5	2529	122	1	2.89	.912	5	2	3	298	12	0	2.42	—
1995–96	Adirondack Red Wings	AHL	3	1	2	0	178	11	0	3.71	.879	—	—	—	—	—	—	—	—
1996–97	Edmonton Oilers	NHL	19	4	8	0	879	41	1	2.80	.899	—	—	—	—	—	—	—	—
1997–98	Edmonton Oilers	NHL	16	6	6	1	825	35	0	2.55	.913	1	0	0	27	1	0	2.31	.909
1998–99	Edmonton Oilers	NHL	39	12	14	6	2091	96	0	2.75	.901	—	—	—	—	—	—	—	—
1999–2000	Phoenix Coyotes	NHL	30	13	10	3	1573	73	1	2.78	.898	—	—	—	—	—	—	—	—
2000–01	Vancouver Canucks	NHL	39	18	12	3	2059	92	1	2.68	.892	2	0	2	122	6	0	2.95	.897
2001–02	Buffalo Sabres	NHL	9	0	5	0	350	17	0	2.91	.850	—	—	—	—	—	—	—	—
NHL totals			446	173	176	47	24,215	1270	18	3.15	.895	16	4	9	864	51	0	3.54	.876

=== International ===
Year	Team	Event	GP	W	L	T	MIN	GA	SO	GAA
1990	Canada	WC	4				101	5	0	2.97

== Awards and honours ==
Award	Year
All-CCHA First Team	1984-85
All-CCHA Second Team	1985-86
Stanley Cup	2011
