= 1985–86 NCAA Division I men's ice hockey season =

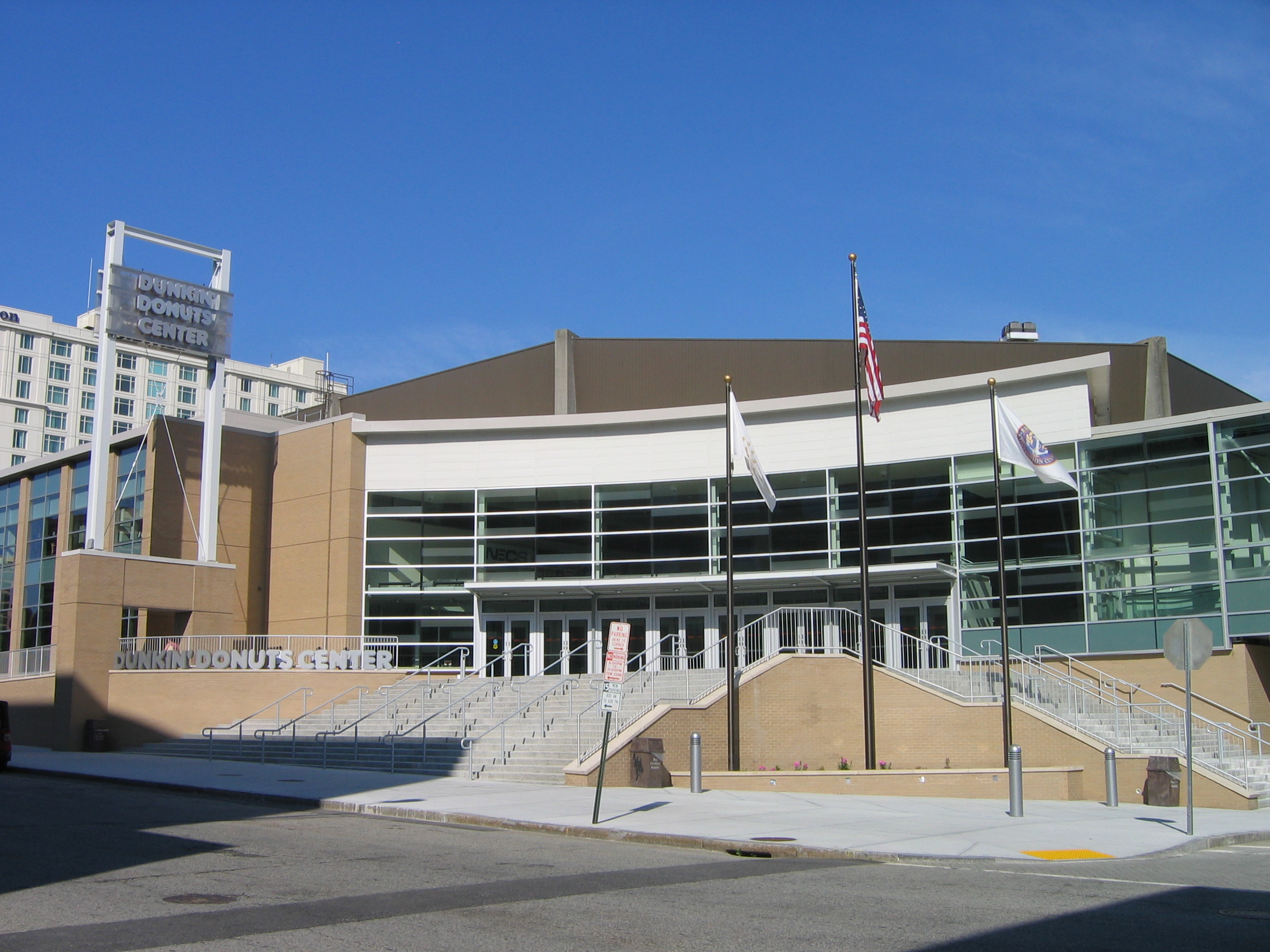
- The Providence Civic Center served as the host for the 1986 Frozen Four
- Duration: October 1985– March 29, 1986
- NCAA tournament: 1986
- National championship: Providence Civic Center; Providence, Rhode Island
- NCAA champion: Michigan State
- Hobey Baker Award: Scott Fusco (Harvard)

The 1985–86 NCAA Division I men's ice hockey season began in October 1985 and concluded with the 1986 NCAA Division I Men's Ice Hockey Tournament's championship game on March 29, 1986 at the Providence Civic Center in Providence, Rhode Island. This was the 39th season in which an NCAA ice hockey championship was held and is the 92nd year overall where an NCAA school fielded a team.

The 1985–86 season was the first for the Great West Hockey Conference.

== Season Outlook ==
=== Pre-season polls ===
The top teams in the nation.

The WMPL poll was voted on by coaches before the start of the season. The College Hockey Statistics Bureau (CHSB) / WMEB poll was voted on by media after the season started.

Radio station WMEB of Orono, Maine, took over the College Hockey Statistics Bureau poll in 1985.

WMPL Poll
Rank	Team
1	Harvard
2	Boston College
3	Michigan State
4	Minnesota
5	Minnesota Duluth
6	North Dakota
7	Bowling Green
8	Boston University
9	Wisconsin
10	Lake Superior State

CHSB / WMEB Poll
Rank	Team
1	Boston College (1)
2	Minnesota (2)
3	Michigan State
4	Harvard (4)
5	Boston University (2)
6	Bowling Green
7	Minnesota Duluth (1)
8	Wisconsin (1)
9	Rensselaer (1)
10	North Dakota (1)

== Regular season ==
=== Season tournaments ===
Tournament	Dates	Teams	Champion
Empire Cup	November 29–30	4	St. Lawrence
Rensselaer Holiday Tournament	November 29–30	4	Rensselaer
Syracuse Invitational	December 27–28	4	RIT
Great Lakes Invitational	December 28–29	4	Michigan State
KeyBank Tournament	December 28–29	4	Toronto
Auld Lang Syne Classic	December 30–31	4	Vermont
Thunderbird Centennial Classic	January 3–4	4	Cornell
Beanpot	February 3, 10	4	Boston University

=== Standings ===
1985–86 Central Collegiate Hockey Association standings
	Conference							Overall					
	GP	W	L	T	PTS	GF	GA	GP	W	L	T	GF	GA
Michigan State†	32	23	7	2	48	177	124	45	34	9	2	245	161
Bowling Green	32	23	9	0	46	179	129	42	28	14	0	218	164
Western Michigan*	32	23	9	0	46	189	138	44	32	12	0	256	177
Lake Superior State	32	17	14	1	35	133	124	43	24	18	1	170	153
Ohio State	32	16	15	1	33	157	177	43	23	19	1	219	203
Ferris State	32	13	17	2	28	152	174	38	17	19	2	191	202
Illinois-Chicago	32	12	20	0	24	137	161	40	14	25	1	164	197
Michigan	32	10	22	0	20	151	184	38	12	26	0	182	222
Miami	32	3	27	2	8	113	177	38	8	28	2	158	201
Championship: Western Michigan † indicates conference regular season champion * indicates conference tournament champion

1985–86 ECAC Hockey standings
	Conference							Overall					
	GP	W	L	T	PTS	GF	GA	GP	W	L	T	GF	GA
Harvard†	21	18	3	0	36	129	53	34	25	8	1	187	95
Yale	21	15	6	0	30	104	72	30	20	10	0	160	116
Cornell*	21	13	6	2	28	101	74	32	21	7	4	145	104
Rensselaer	21	13	7	1	27	100	88	32	20	11	1	167	139
Clarkson	21	12	6	3	27	101	70	32	18	11	3	143	110
Vermont	21	11	10	0	22	64	63	31	17	13	1	102	99
St. Lawrence	21	10	11	0	20	92	92	31	16	15	0	145	150
Colgate	21	9	11	1	19	82	109	32	15	15	2	142	147
Princeton	21	7	13	0	14	76	82	30	11	17	2	109	111
Dartmouth	21	4	17	0	8	59	121	25	7	18	0	78	134
Army^	11	2	9	0	4^	36	57	30	18	11	1	154	111
Brown	21	3	18	0	6	63	127	23	4	19	0	73	134
Championship: Cornell † indicates conference regular season champion * indicates conference tournament champion^ Army played a half schedule

1985–86 Great West Hockey Conference standings
	Conference							Overall					
	GP	W	L	T	PTS	GF	GA	GP	W	L	T	GF	GA
US International†	12	9	3	0	18	-	-	33	20	13	0	-	-
Alaska–Fairbanks	12	6	5	1	13	-	-	25	17	7	1	152	93
Northern Arizona	12	5	7	0	10	-	-	28	11	17	0	135	179
Alaska–Anchorage	12	3	8	1	7	50	62	33	12	20	1	160	158
† indicates conference regular season champion

1985–86 Hockey East standings
	Conference							Overall					
	GP	W	L	T	PTS	GF	GA	GP	W	L	T	GF	GA
Boston College†	34	23	9	2	48	158	123	42	26	13	3	188	154
Boston University*	34	20	11	3	43	147	127	43	25	14	4	184	156
Northeastern	34	18	14	2	38	165	158	39	20	17	2	185	185
Providence	34	11	22	1	23	105	140	39	14	24	1	122	160
Maine	34	8	25	1	17	118	177	40	11	28	1	142	201
Lowell	34	5	27	2	12	118	166	42	11	29	2	156	205
New Hampshire	34	5	27	2	12	114	188	37	5	29	3	121	199
Championship: Boston University † indicates conference regular season champion * indicates conference tournament champion

1985–86 NCAA Division I Independent ice hockey standings
	Conference							Overall					
	GP	W	L	T	PTS	GF	GA	GP	W	L	T	GF	GA
Air Force	0	0	0	0	-	-	-	28	15	13	0	129	133
Kent State	0	0	0	0	-	-	-	36	21	13	2	-	-
Notre Dame	0	0	0	0	-	-	-	34	12	21	1	154	210

1985–86 Western Collegiate Hockey Association standings
	Conference							Overall					
	GP	W	L	T	PTS	GF	GA	GP	W	L	T	GF	GA
Denver†*	34	25	9	0	50	169	115	48	34	13	1	236	158
Minnesota	34	24	10	0	48	177	115	48	35	13	0	252	157
Wisconsin	34	23	11	0	46	172	136	42	27	15	0	206	173
Minnesota-Duluth	34	21	12	1	43	153	117	42	26	13	3	206	157
Northern Michigan	34	21	13	0	42	168	151	39	23	14	2	191	169
North Dakota	34	19	14	1	39	155	136	41	24	16	1	188	156
Colorado College	34	11	21	2	24	131	155	40	12	26	2	158	191
Michigan Tech	34	9	22	3	21	118	164	40	10	26	4	136	205
Championship: Denver † indicates conference regular season champion * indicates conference tournament champion

=== Final regular season polls ===
The final top 10 teams as ranked by coaches and the media before the conference tournament finals.

WMPL Coaches Poll
Ranking	Team
1	Denver (9)
2	Minnesota (1)
3	Michigan State
4	Boston College
5	Wisconsin
6	Harvard
7	Boston University
8	Western Michigan
9	Northern Michigan
10	Minnesota Duluth

CHSB / WMEB Media Poll
Ranking	Team
1	Denver (12)
2	Minnesota
3	Harvard
4	Michigan State
5	Boston College
6	Wisconsin
7	Boston University
8	Western Michigan
9	Yale
10	Minnesota Duluth

== 1986 NCAA Tournament ==
Quarterfinals; March 21–23
E1	Boston University	4	3	7
W4	Minnesota	6	5	11
W2	Michigan State	6	4	10
E3	Boston College	4	2	6
W1	Denver	4	3	7
E4	Cornell	2	4	6
E2	Harvard	4	7	11
W3	Western Michigan	2	2	4

Semifinals; March 27–28
W4	Minnesota	4
W2	Michigan State	6
W1	Denver	2
E2	Harvard	5

National championship March 29
W2	Michigan State	6
E2	Harvard	5
Third-place game
W4	Minnesota	6
W1	Denver	4

Note: * denotes overtime period(s)

== Player stats ==
=== Scoring leaders ===
The following players led the league in points at the conclusion of the season.

GP = Games played; G = Goals; A = Assists; Pts = Points; PIM = Penalty minutes

Player	Class	Team	GP	G	A	Pts	PIM
Dan Dorion	Senior	Western Michigan	42	42	62	104	48
Dallas Gaume	Senior	Denver	47	32	67	99	18
Mike Donnelly	Senior	Michigan State	44	59	38	97	65
Dwight Mathiasen	Junior	Denver	48	40	49	89	48
Brett Hull	Sophomore	Minnesota−Duluth	42	52	32	84	46
Troy Thrun	Junior	Western Michigan	44	33	51	84	20
Corey Millen	Junior	Minnesota	48	41	42	83	64
Pat Micheletti	Senior	Minnesota	48	32	48	80	113
Stu Burnie	Senior	Western Michigan	42	43	36	79	78
Scott Harlow	Senior	Boston College	42	38	41	79	48

=== Leading goaltenders ===
The following goaltenders led the league in goals against average at the end of the regular season while playing at least 33% of their team's total minutes.

GP = Games played; Min = Minutes played; W = Wins; L = Losses; OT = Overtime/shootout losses; GA = Goals against; SO = Shutouts; SV% = Save percentage; GAA = Goals against average

Player	Class	Team	GP	Min	W	L	OT	GA	SO	SV%	GAA
Grant Blair	Senior	Harvard	31	1812	24	6	1	82	3	.896	2.72
John Blue	Sophomore	Minnesota	29	1588	20	6	0	80	2	.890	3.02
Joe Shawhan	Junior	Lake Superior State	20	-	-	-	-	-	1	-	3.03
Doug Dadswell	Sophomore	Cornell	30	1815	20	7	3	92	1	.914	3.04
Tom Draper	Junior	Vermont	29	1697	15	12	1	87	1	.898	3.08
Chris Olson	Junior	Denver	27	-	-	-	-	-	1	.900	3.12
Jamie Falle	Senior	Clarkson	31	1881	18	10	3	101	0	.888	3.22
Bob Essensa	Junior	Michigan State	23	1333	17	4	1	74	1	.881	3.33
Terry Taillefer	Junior	Boston University	25	1651	-	-	-	93	-	.893	3.38
Scott Brower	Sophomore	North Dakota	20	-	-	-	-	-	1	.886	3.47

== Awards ==
=== NCAA ===
Award		Recipient
Hobey Baker Memorial Award		Scott Fusco, Harvard
Spencer Penrose Award		Ralph Backstrom, Denver
Most Outstanding Player in NCAA Tournament		Mike Donnelly, Michigan State
AHCA All-American Teams
East First Team	Position	West First Team
Doug Dadswell, Cornell	G	Gary Kruzich, Bowling Green
Cliff Abrecht, Princeton	D	Wayne Gagné, Western Michigan
Mike Dark, Rensselaer	D	Norm Maciver, Minnesota-Duluth
Scott Fusco, Harvard	F	Dallas Gaume, Denver
Scott Harlow, Boston College	F	Mike Donnelly, Michigan State
Joe Nieuwendyk, Cornell	F	Dan Dorion, Western Michigan
East Second Team	Position	West Second Team
Grant Blair, Harvard	G	Bill Horn, Western Michigan
Chris Terreri, Providence	G	Chris Olson, Denver
Mark Benning, Harvard	D	Don McSween, Michigan State
Jay Octeau, Boston University	D	Scott Sandelin, North Dakota
Andy Otto, Clarkson	D	Jim Smith, Denver
Doug Brown, Boston College	F	Matt Christensen, Minnesota-Duluth
John Cullen, Boston University	F	Dwight Mathiasen, Denver
Clark Donatelli, Boston University	F	Corey Millen, Minnesota
Randy Wood, Yale	F	Jamie Wansbrough, Bowling Green

=== CCHA ===
Awards		Recipient
Player of the Year		Dan Dorion, Western Michigan
Rookie of the Year		Joe Murphy, Michigan State
Coach of the Year		Bill Wilkinson, Western Michigan
Most Valuable Player in Tournament		Bill Horn, Western Michigan
All-CCHA Teams
First Team	Position	Second Team
Gary Kruzich, Bowling Green	G	Bob Essensa, Michigan State
Don McSween, Michigan State	D	Brian McKee, Bowling Green
Wayne Gagné, Western Michigan	D	Chris MacDonald, Western Michigan
Mike Donnelly, Michigan State	F	Paul Ysebaert, Bowling Green
Jamie Wansbrough, Bowling Green	F	Brad Jones, Michigan
Dan Dorion, Western Michigan	F	Stu Burnie, Western Michigan

=== ECAC ===
Award		Recipient
Player of the Year		Scott Fusco, Harvard
Rookie of the Year		John Messuri, Princeton
Most Outstanding Player in Tournament		Doug Dadswell, Cornell
All-ECAC Hockey Teams
First Team	Position	Second Team
Tom Draper, Vermont	G	Doug Dadswell, Cornell
Mike Dark, Rensselaer	D	Randy Taylor, Harvard
Cliff Abrecht, Princeton	D	Mark Benning, Harvard
	D	Chris Norton, Cornell
Scott Fusco, Harvard	F	Gerard Waslen, Colgate
Joe Nieuwendyk, Cornell	F	Bob Logan, Yale
Randy Wood, Yale	F	Tim Smith, Harvard

=== Hockey East ===
Award		Recipient
Player of the Year		Scott Harlow, Boston College
Rookie of the Year		Al Loring, Maine
		Scott Young, Boston University
Coach of the Year Award		Jack Parker, Boston University
William Flynn Tournament Most Valuable Player		Peter Marshall, Boston University
All-Hockey East Teams
First Team	Position	Second Team
Scott Gordon, Boston College	G	Terry Taillefer, Boston University
Scott Shaunessy, Boston University	D	Bob Emery, Boston College
Claude Lodin, Northeastern	D	Paul Fitzsimmons, Northeastern
David Quinn, Boston University	D	
Scott Harlow, Boston College	F	Gord Cruickshank, Providence
John Cullen, Boston University	F	Doug Brown, Boston College
Jay Heinbuck, Northeastern	F	Clark Donatelli, Boston University

=== WCHA ===
Award		Recipient
Most Valuable Player		Dallas Gaume, Denver
Freshman of the Year		Mike Richter, Wisconsin
Coach of the Year		Ralph Backstrom, Denver
All-WCHA Teams
First Team	Position	Second Team
John Blue, Minnesota	G	Tom Allen, Denver
Norm Maciver, Minnesota-Duluth	D	Marty Wiitala, Wisconsin
Scott Sandelin, North Dakota	D	Rob Doyle, Colorado College
Dallas Gaume, Denver	F	Corey Millen, Minnesota
Gary Emmons, Northern Michigan	F	Pat Micheletti, Minnesota
Brett Hull, Minnesota-Duluth	F	Dwight Mathiasen, Denver

== 1986 NHL entry draft ==
Round	Pick	Player	College	Conference	NHL team
1	1	Joe Murphy	Michigan State	CCHA	Detroit Red Wings
1	5	Shawn Anderson	Maine	Hockey East	Buffalo Sabres
1	9	Brian Leetch ^{†}	Boston College	Hockey East	New York Rangers
1	11	Scott Young	Boston University	Hockey East	Hartford Whalers
1	13	Craig Janney	Boston College	Hockey East	Boston Bruins
1	16	George Pelawa ^{†}	North Dakota	WCHA	Calgary Flames
1	17	Tom Fitzgerald ^{†}	Providence	Hockey East	New York Islanders
2	24	Todd Copeland ^{†}	Michigan	CCHA	New Jersey Devils
2	25	Dave Capuano ^{†}	Maine	Hockey East	Pittsburgh Penguins
2	26	Greg Brown ^{†}	Boston College	Hockey East	Buffalo Sabres
2	30	Neil Wilkinson ^{†}	Michigan State	CCHA	Minnesota North Stars
2	31	Mike Posma ^{†}	Western Michigan	CCHA	St. Louis Blues
2	38	Dennis Vaske ^{†}	Minnesota–Duluth	WCHA	New York Islanders
3	43	Derek Mayer	Denver	WCHA	Detroit Red Wings
3	47	Bob Corkum	Maine	Hockey East	Buffalo Sabres
3	49	Don Gibson ^{†}	Michigan State	CCHA	Vancouver Canucks
3	52	Tony Hejna ^{†}	Rensselaer	ECAC Hockey	St. Louis Blues
3	54	Rick Bennett ^{†}	Providence	Hockey East	Minnesota North Stars
3	58	Brad Turner ^{†}	Michigan	CCHA	Minnesota North Stars
4	68	David Baseggio	Yale	ECAC Hockey	Buffalo Sabres
4	76	Dean Hall ^{†}	Northern Michigan	WCHA	Boston Bruins
4	78	Brent Bobyck ^{†}	North Dakota	WCHA	Montreal Canadiens
5	86	Dave Guden ^{†}	Providence	Hockey East	Los Angeles Kings
5	88	Sandy Smith ^{†}	Minnesota–Duluth	WCHA	Pittsburgh Penguins
5	89	Larry Rooney ^{†}	Providence	Hockey East	Buffalo Sabres
5	91	Eric Murano ^{†}	Denver	WCHA	Vancouver Canucks
5	95	Bill Horn	Western Michigan	CCHA	Hartford Whalers
5	97	Matt Pesklewis ^{†}	Boston University	Hockey East	Boston Bruins
5	100	Scott Bloom ^{†}	Minnesota	WCHA	Calgary Flames
6	107	Robb Stauber ^{†}	Minnesota	WCHA	Los Angeles Kings
6	113	Rob Bateman ^{†}	Vermont	ECAC Hockey	Winnipeg Jets
6	115	Mike O'Toole ^{†}	Michigan State	CCHA	St. Louis Blues
6	116	Joe Quinn ^{†}	Bowling Green	CCHA	Hartford Whalers
6	117	Scott White	Michigan Tech	WCHA	Quebec Nordiques
6	121	John Parker ^{†}	Wisconsin	WCHA	Calgary Flames
6	125	Steve Scheifele ^{†}	Boston College	Hockey East	Philadelphia Flyers
6	126	Jim Ennis	Boston University	Hockey East	Edmonton Oilers
7	128	Sean Krakiwsky	Minnesota–Duluth	WCHA	Los Angeles Kings
7	133	Jon Helgeson ^{†}	Wisconsin	WCHA	Vancouver Canucks
7	134	Mark Vermette	Lake Superior State	CCHA	Quebec Nordiques
7	136	Andy May ^{†}	Northeastern	Hockey East	St. Louis Blues
8	149	Rene Chapdelaine	Lake Superior State	CCHA	Los Angeles Kings
8	150	Ryan Pardoski ^{†}	Michigan	CCHA	New Jersey Devils
8	151	Steve Rohlik ^{†}	Wisconsin	WCHA	Pittsburgh Penguins
8	153	Steve Brennan ^{†}	Clarkson	ECAC Hockey	Toronto Maple Leafs
8	155	Frank Furlan ^{†}	Michigan Tech	WCHA	Winnipeg Jets
8	156	Barry Chyzowski ^{†}	Minnesota–Duluth	WCHA	New York Rangers
8	157	Randy Skarda ^{†}	Minnesota	WCHA	St. Louis Blues
8	158	Ron Hoover	Western Michigan	CCHA	Hartford Whalers
8	159	Scott Mathias	Denver	WCHA	Minnesota North Stars
8	160	Brian Ferreira ^{†}	Rensselaer	ECAC Hockey	Boston Bruins
8	161	Marty Nanne	Minnesota	WCHA	Chicago Black Hawks
8	163	Mark Olsen	Colorado College	WCHA	Calgary Flames
8	164	Peter Harris ^{†}	Lowell	Hockey East	New York Islanders
8	166	Lee Davidson ^{†}	North Dakota	WCHA	Washington Capitals
8	167	Murray Baron ^{†}	North Dakota	WCHA	Philadelphia Flyers
9	169	Marc Potvin ^{†}	Bowling Green	CCHA	Detroit Red Wings
9	170	Trevor Pochipinski ^{†}	Colorado College	WCHA	Los Angeles Kings
9	171	Scott McCormack ^{†}	Harvard	ECAC Hockey	New Jersey Devils
9	173	Sean Whitham	Providence	Hockey East	Buffalo Sabres
9	174	Brian Bellefeuille ^{†}	Illinois–Chicago	CCHA	Toronto Maple Leafs
9	175	Matt Merten ^{†}	Providence	Hockey East	Vancouver Canucks
9	176	Mark Green ^{†}	Clarkson	ECAC Hockey	Winnipeg Jets
9	177	Pat Scanlon ^{†}	Minnesota–Duluth	WCHA	New York Rangers
9	178	Martyn Ball ^{†}	St. Lawrence	ECAC Hockey	St. Louis Blues
9	180	Lance Pitlick ^{†}	Minnesota	WCHA	Minnesota North Stars
9	181	Jeff Flaherty ^{†}	Lowell	Hockey East	Boston Bruins
9	184	Scott Sharples ^{†}	Michigan	CCHA	Calgary Flames
9	185	Jeff Jablonski ^{†}	Lake Superior State	CCHA	New York Islanders
9	188	Blaine Rude ^{†}	Minnesota	WCHA	Philadelphia Flyers
9	189	Mike Greenlay ^{†}	Lake Superior State	CCHA	Edmonton Oilers
10	190	Scott King ^{†}	Maine	Hockey East	Detroit Red Wings
10	197	John Blue ^{†}	Minnesota	WCHA	Winnipeg Jets
10	201	Dan Keczmer ^{†}	Lake Superior State	CCHA	Minnesota North Stars
10	207	Chris Lappin ^{†}	Boston University	Hockey East	Quebec Nordiques
10	209	Shaun Sabol ^{†}	Wisconsin	WCHA	Philadelphia Flyers
10	210	Matt Lanza ^{†}	Rensselaer	ECAC Hockey	Edmonton Oilers
11	211	Tom Bissett	Michigan Tech	WCHA	Detroit Red Wings
11	212	Russ Mann	St. Lawrence	ECAC Hockey	Los Angeles Kings
11	218	Matt Coté	Lake Superior State	CCHA	Winnipeg Jets
11	219	Russ Parent ^{†}	North Dakota	WCHA	New York Rangers
11	221	Cal Brown ^{†}	Colorado College	WCHA	Hartford Whalers
11	224	Chris Thayer ^{†}	New Hampshire	Hockey East	Chicago Black Hawks
11	227	Dan Beaudette ^{†}	Miami	CCHA	New York Islanders
11	230	Brett Lawrence ^{†}	Colgate	ECAC Hockey	Philadelphia Flyers
12	234	Bill Butler	Vermont	ECAC Hockey	St. Louis Blues
12	236	Doug Kirton ^{†}	Colorado College	WCHA	New Jersey Devils
12	241	Dave O'Brien	Northeastern	Hockey East	Boston Bruins
12	243	Kurt Stahura ^{†}	Wisconsin	WCHA	Minnesota North Stars
12	244	Joel Gardner ^{†}	Colgate	ECAC Hockey	Boston Bruins
12	249	Sean Boudreault ^{†}	Lowell	Hockey East	Quebec Nordiques
12	251	Dan Stefano ^{†}	St. Lawrence	ECAC Hockey	Philadelphia Flyers

† incoming freshman

== See also ==
- 1985–86 NCAA Division III men's ice hockey season
