= 1986–87 North Dakota Fighting Sioux men's ice hockey season =

National champion WCHA, champion WCHA tournament, champion 1987 NCAA tournament, champion
- Conference: 1st WCHA
- Home ice: Winter Sports Center

Record
- Overall: 40–8–0
- Conference: 29–6–0
- Home: 26–2–0
- Road: 12–6–0
- Neutral: 2–0–0

Coaches and captains
- Head coach: John Gasparini
- Assistant coaches: Dean Blais; Cary Eades; John Marks
- Captain: Bob Joyce
- Alternate captain(s): Mickey Krampotich; Ian Kidd

The 1986–87 North Dakota Fighting Sioux men's ice hockey team represented the University of North Dakota in college ice hockey. In its 9th year under head coach John Gasparini the team compiled a 40–8–0 record and reached the NCAA tournament for the eleventh time. The Fighting Sioux defeated defending champion Michigan State 5–3 to win the championship game at the Joe Louis Arena in Detroit, Michigan.

== Season ==
=== Early season ===
After a rather dismal season, North Dakota was expected to improve but not challenge for the WCHA title in 1987. The team, however, received a major boon from two players that changed their fortune. The first was from freshman goaltender Ed Belfour, a 21-year old player who had spent the past three years in relative obscurity in the Manitoba Junior Hockey League. The second was from returning sophomore Tony Hrkac who had produced well in his first campaign but spent the entire 1985–86 season with the Canadian National Team.

The two players were instrumental in Gino Gasparini's team getting off to a fast start, winning its first 8 games and jumping out to a huge lead in the conference standings. While Belfour was establishing himself in net as one of the top players in the country, Hrkac was on an all-time scoring pace, flanked by Bob Joyce and Steve Johnson. The Fighting Sioux split a pair of weekends on the road but they used their indomitable home crowd to their advantage and finished the month of November with a 14–2 record (13–2 in conference).

=== December slump ===
North Dakota began December with another road split and followed that with their first home loss of the year, losing to a middling US International squad. Though they recovered slightly in the second game of the weekend the team lost both games of its holiday weekend in New England. Having lost four of their previous five games and producing some of their worst performances of the season, it appeared that the Fighting Sioux might be sliding back to the pack but a 4-game stretch at home came at the perfect time.

=== Winning streak ===
UND hosted the two Boston schools at the beginning of January and took both games, dispelling any doubts about their ability to compete with Eastern teams, then welcomed in WCHA powerhouse Minnesota. The defense returned in force, holding the Gophers to two goals in each game and allowing Hrkac to lead the Sioux to consecutive wins and seat North Dakota atop the conference standings.

The Fighting Sioux continued their winning streak for another five weeks, taking 14 matches before their next loss which came on the final weekend of the regular season. UND finished with a record of 31–7 and won the WCHA handily, ending 7 points above Minnesota.

=== WCHA tournament ===
As the top seed, North Dakota would be able to play each round of the conference tournament at home. They faced Minnesota–Duluth in the quarters, easily dispatching the Bulldogs in both games. Next up was Colorado College who had upset in-state rival Denver. The Tigers fell 6–2 in the first game and the 4-goal advantage allowed the Fighting Sioux to get away with a sloppy effort in the rematch; CC won the second game but only by a single goal and North Dakota advanced to the championship with a 7–4 series win.

North Dakota met Minnesota once more in the finals and again, despite possessing one of the top offenses in the country, couldn't get much past the Fighting Sioux defense. UND won both games by a 5–3 score and won the WCHA championship, their first in 7 years. The 36 wins they had at that point set a new program record while Tony Hrkac finished with 104 points, just 6 points away from a new NCAA record.

=== NCAA tournament ===
North Dakota received the top western seed, and played another home series, this time against ECAC Hockey runner-Up St. Lawrence. UND won both games to take the total-goal series 9–4 with Hrkac piling up the points (2 goals and 5 assists), breaking Bill Watson's record for points in a season with two games yet to play. Additionally, the Fighting Sioux tied the NCAA record for wins in a season with 38 (Michigan State, 1985).

UND met 1986 Runner-Up Harvard in the semifinal at the Joe Louis Arena. Once again Hrkac was the story of the game, scoring a goal and adding three assists as the Fighting Sioux trounced the Crimson 5–2 to reach the championship. On defending National Champion Michigan State stood in their way but just as they had against Harvard, UND got off to a quick start; this time with was Ian Kidd who led the way with a goal and two assists in the first period. North Dakota built a 3–0 lead after 20 minutes while allowed only 2 shots from the Spartans to reach Ed Belfour. MSU woke up in the second period, scoring twice on 8 shots, but the Sioux added another goal of their own as well as a fifth goal in the third to hold off Michigan State. The Spartans eventually scored their third of the game but it came too late to mount a comeback and North Dakota won their fifth national championship.

=== Awards and honors ===
Tony Hrkac scored 12 points in four tournament games, the second-highest total ever (behind the 13 points by both Aaron Broten (1981) and Tony Amonte (1990) as of 2019) and was awarded the tournament MOP despite scoring only once in the championship match. He was joined on the All-Tournament team by Ed Belfour, Ian Kidd and Bob Joyce. Just prior to the championship game Hrkac received the Hobey Baker Award as the top Division I athlete and finished the season as the first North Dakota player to lead the NCAA in scoring. Hrkac's 116 points in an NCAA record for a single season and is 7 better than the next-highest total (as of 2019). Head coach Gino Gasparini, for leading his team to the first-ever 40-win season, was awarded the Spencer Penrose Award as the top Division I coach, also a first for North Dakota. Hrkac, Joyce and Kidd were also named to the AHCA All-American West first-team, while Belfour was a second-team All-American.

All four players were also on the All-WCHA First Team with Hrkac being named as the conference Most Valuable Player and Gasparini as the Coach of the Year for the third time.

Both Ed Belfour and Tony Hrkac left the program after the season to begin their professional careers. Hrkac played a long time in the NHL, amassing 371 over 758 games while Belfour finished his career with the then-3rd-most wins in NHL history (484) and was elected to the Hockey Hall of Fame in 2011.

== Standings ==
1986–87 Western Collegiate Hockey Association standings
	Conference							Overall					
	GP	W	L	T	PTS	GF	GA	GP	W	L	T	GF	GA
North Dakota†*	35	29	6	0	58	200	94	48	40	8	0	264	129
Minnesota	35	25	9	1	51	176	123	49	34	14	1	248	165
Denver	35	16	16	3	35	150	149	40	19	18	3	182	172
Wisconsin	35	17	17	1	35	127	134	42	23	18	1	160	155
Northern Michigan	35	16	18	1	33	131	144	40	18	21	1	151	164
Colorado College	35	12	22	1	25	143	151	42	17	24	1	171	176
Michigan Tech	35	11	23	1	23	118	182	40	11	28	1	130	218
Minnesota-Duluth	35	11	23	1	23	114	163	39	11	27	1	121	184
Championship: North Dakota † indicates conference regular season champion * indicates conference tournament champion

== Schedule ==
Date	Opponent^{#}	Rank^{#}	Site	Result	Record
Regular season
October 10	at Minnesota–Duluth		Duluth Arena Auditorium • Duluth, Minnesota	W 6–2	1–0 (1–0)
October 11	at Minnesota–Duluth		Duluth Arena Auditorium • Duluth, Minnesota	W 7–1	2–0 (2–0)
October 17	at Denver		DU Arena • Denver, Colorado	W 5–2	3–0 (3–0)
October 18	at Denver		DU Arena • Denver, Colorado	W 11–5	4–0 (4–0)
October 24	vs. Northern Michigan		Winter Sports Center • Grand Forks, North Dakota	W 8–4	5–0 (5–0)
October 25	vs. Northern Michigan		Winter Sports Center • Grand Forks, North Dakota	W 6–4	6–0 (6–0)
October 31	vs. Wisconsin		Winter Sports Center • Grand Forks, North Dakota	W 9–4	7–0 (7–0)
November 1	vs. Wisconsin		Winter Sports Center • Grand Forks, North Dakota	W 6–2	8–0 (8–0)
November 7	at Michigan Tech		MacInnes Student Ice Arena • Houghton, Michigan	L 5–8	8–1 (8–1)
November 8	at Michigan Tech		MacInnes Student Ice Arena • Houghton, Michigan	W 4–2	9–1 (9–1)
November 14	at Minnesota		Williams Arena • Minneapolis, Minnesota	W 4–1	10–1 (10–1)
November 15	at Minnesota		Williams Arena • Minneapolis, Minnesota	L 1–4	10–2 (10–2)
November 21	vs. Colorado College		Winter Sports Center • Grand Forks, North Dakota	W 7–3	11–2 (11–2)
November 22	vs. Colorado College		Winter Sports Center • Grand Forks, North Dakota	W 11–2	12–2 (12–2)
November 28	vs. New Hampshire†		Winter Sports Center • Grand Forks, North Dakota	W 10–0	13–2 (13–2)
November 30	vs. Yale*		Winter Sports Center • Grand Forks, North Dakota	W 6–4	14–2 (13–2)
December 5	at Colorado College		Broadmoor World Arena • Colorado Springs, Colorado	W 4–3 ^{OT}	15–2 (14–2)
December 6	at Colorado College		Broadmoor World Arena • Colorado Springs, Colorado	L 2–3	15–3 (14–3)
December 12	vs. US International*		Winter Sports Center • Grand Forks, North Dakota	L 3–5	15–4 (14–3)
December 13	vs. US International*		Winter Sports Center • Grand Forks, North Dakota	W 6–3	16–4 (14–3)
December 27	at Maine†		Alfond Arena • Orono, Maine	L 4–5	16–5 (14–4)
December 28	at Lowell†		Tully Forum • Billerica, Massachusetts	L 1–4	16–6 (14–5)
January 2	vs. Boston College†		Winter Sports Center • Grand Forks, North Dakota	W 7–5	17–6 (15–5)
January 4	vs. Boston University†		Winter Sports Center • Grand Forks, North Dakota	W 4–3	18–6 (16–5)
January 9	vs. Minnesota		Winter Sports Center • Grand Forks, North Dakota	W 5–2	19–6 (17–5)
January 10	vs. Minnesota		Winter Sports Center • Grand Forks, North Dakota	W 4–2	20–6 (18–5)
January 16	at Providence†		Schneider Arena • Providence, Rhode Island	W 5–1	21–6 (19–5)
January 18	at Northeastern†		Matthews Arena • Boston, Massachusetts	W 4–1	22–6 (20–5)
January 23	vs. Michigan Tech		Winter Sports Center • Grand Forks, North Dakota	W 11–2	23–6 (21–5)
January 24	vs. Michigan Tech		Winter Sports Center • Grand Forks, North Dakota	W 11–2	24–6 (22–5)
January 30	at Wisconsin		Dane County Coliseum • Madison, Wisconsin	W 5–4	25–6 (23–5)
January 31	at Wisconsin		Dane County Coliseum • Madison, Wisconsin	W 2–1	26–6 (24–5)
February 6	vs. Minnesota–Duluth		Winter Sports Center • Grand Forks, North Dakota	W 5–0	27–6 (25–5)
February 7	vs. Minnesota–Duluth		Winter Sports Center • Grand Forks, North Dakota	W 9–3	28–6 (26–5)
February 13	vs. Denver		Winter Sports Center • Grand Forks, North Dakota	W 4–1	29–6 (27–5)
February 14	vs. Denver		Winter Sports Center • Grand Forks, North Dakota	W 5–2	30–6 (28–5)
February 20	at Northern Michigan		Lakeview Arena • Marquette, Michigan	L 3–6	30–7 (28–6)
February 21	at Northern Michigan		Lakeview Arena • Marquette, Michigan	W 5–0	31–7 (29–6)
WCHA tournament
February 28	vs. Minnesota–Duluth*		Winter Sports Center • Grand Forks, North Dakota (WCHA Quarterfinal game 1)	W 5–3	32–7 (29–6)
March 1	vs. Minnesota–Duluth*		Winter Sports Center • Grand Forks, North Dakota (WCHA Quarterfinal game 2)	W 8–1	33–7 (29–6)
North Dakota Won Series 13-4
March 8	vs. Colorado College*		Winter Sports Center • Grand Forks, North Dakota (WCHA Semifinal game 1)	W 6–2	34–7 (29–6)
March 9	vs. Colorado College*		Winter Sports Center • Grand Forks, North Dakota (WCHA Semifinal game 2)	L 1–2	34–8 (29–6)
North Dakota Won Series 7-4
March 13	vs. Minnesota*		Winter Sports Center • Grand Forks, North Dakota (WCHA championship game 1)	W 5–3	35–8 (29–6)
March 14	vs. Minnesota*		Winter Sports Center • Grand Forks, North Dakota (WCHA championship game 2)	W 5–3	36–8 (29–6)
North Dakota Won Series 10-6
NCAA tournament
March 20	vs. St. Lawrence*		Winter Sports Center • Grand Forks, North Dakota (National Quarterfinal game 1)	W 3–1	37–8 (29–6)
March 21	vs. St. Lawrence*		Winter Sports Center • Grand Forks, North Dakota (National Quarterfinal game 2)	W 6–3	38–8 (29–6)
North Dakota Won Series 7-2
March 26	vs. Harvard*		Joe Louis Arena • Detroit, Michigan (National Semifinal)	W 6–2	39–8 (29–6)
March 28	vs. Michigan State*		Joe Louis Arena • Detroit, Michigan (National championship)	W 5–3	40–8 (29–6)
*Non-conference game. ^{#}Rankings from USCHO.com Poll. Source:

† All scheduled games between WCHA and Hockey East teams in the regular season were counted in the standings for both conferences.

== Roster and scoring statistics ==
No.	Name	Year	Position	Hometown	S/P/C	Games	Goals	Assists	Pts	PIM
21	Tony Hrkac	Sophomore	C	Thunder Bay, ON	(Ontario)	48	46	70	116	48
20	Bob Joyce	Junior	LW	Winnipeg, MB	(Manitoba)	48	52	37	89	42
7	Steve Johnson	Junior	W	Grand Forks, ND	(North Dakota)	48	26	44	70	38
4	Ian Kidd	Sophomore	D	Gresham, OR	(Oregon)	47	13	47	60	58
8	Mickey Krampotich	Senior	LW	Hibbing, MN	(Minnesota)	47	27	27	54	18
15	Scott Koberinski	Sophomore	C	North Battleford, SK	(Saskatchewan)	48	19	27	46	34
11	Malcom Parks	Senior	W	Edmonton, AB	(Alberta)	48	18	21	39	50
14	Lee Davidson	Freshman	C	Winnipeg, MB	(Manitoba)	41	16	12	28	65
10	Perry Nakonechny	Senior	W	Dauphin, MB	(Manitoba)	43	6	14	20	42
6	Tom Benson	Junior	D	Victoria, BC	(British Columbia)	47	0	20	20	80
19	Scott Dub	Sophomore	LW	Park River, ND	(North Dakota)	46	11	8	19	81
25	Brett Bobyck	Freshman	C	Regina, SK	(Saskatchewan)	46	8	11	19	16
17	Russ Parent	Freshman	D	Winnipeg, MB	(Manitoba)	47	2	17	19	50
27	Mike LaMoine	Sophomore	D	Grand Forks, ND	(North Dakota)	47	2	17	19	36
22	Grant Paranica	Sophomore	RW	Winnipeg, MB	(Manitoba)	42	5	10	15	38
3	Murray Baron	Freshman	D	Kamloops, BC	(British Columbia)	41	4	10	14	62
9	Jeff Bowen	Senior	LW	East Grand Forks, MN	(Minnesota)	45	5	8	13	42
16	Tarek Howard	Senior	D	Olds, AB	(Alberta)	32	1	9	10	38
18	Bill Claviter	Senior	F	Virginia, MN	(Minnesota)	20	2	2	4	10
5	Darryn Fossand	Freshman	D	Bemidji, MN	(Minnesota)	16	1	2	3	8
29	Ed Belfour	Freshman	G	Carman, MB	(Manitoba)	34	0	2	2	6
23	Gary Kaiser	Freshman	F	Fargo, ND	(North Dakota)	9	0	1	1	18
35	Scott Brower	Junior	G	Viking, AB	(Alberta)	15	0	1	1	4
24	Scott Brickey	Freshman	W	Port Huron, MI	(Michigan)	5	0	1	1	4
13	Rick Forst	Junior	LW	Esterhazy, SK	(Saskatchewan)	1	0	0	0	0
1	Greg Strome	Senior	G	Muenster, SK	(Saskatchewan)	1	0	0	0	0
Total							264	418	682	888

== Goaltending statistics ==
No.	Name	Games	Minutes	Wins	Losses	Ties	Goals against	Saves	Shut outs	SV %	GAA
29	Ed Belfour	34	2049	29	4	0	81	876	3	.915	2.43
35	Scott Brower	15	803	11	4	0	44	282	0	.865	3.09
1	Greg Strome	1	40	0	0	0	3	21	0	.875	4.48
Total		48	–	40	8	0	129	–	3	.902	2.69

== 1987 championship game ==
=== (W1) North Dakota vs. (W2) Michigan State ===
March 28	North Dakota	5 – 3	Michigan State	Joe Louis Arena

Scoring summary
Period	Team	Goal	Assist(s)	Time	Score
1st	UND	Ian Kidd – PP	Joyce	15:07	1–0 UND
1st	UND	Murray Baron	Bowen and Kidd	16:44	2–0 UND
1st	UND	Bob Joyce	Kidd and Hrkac	17:02	3–0 UND
2nd	MSU	Tom Tilly	McReynolds and Messier	28:30	3–1 UND
2nd	UND	Malcolm Parks – GW	Koberinski	35:05	4–1 UND
2nd	MSU	Kevin Miller	unassisted	36:56	4–2 UND
3rd	UND	Brent Bobyck	Parent	47:54	5–2 UND
3rd	MSU	Kip Miller	Miller	58:34	5–3 UND

Shots by period
Team	1	2	3	T
Michigan State	2	8	8	18
North Dakota	8	9	6	23

Goaltenders
Team	Name	Saves	Goals against	Time on ice
MSU	Bob Essensa	18	5	60:00
UND	Ed Belfour	15	3	60:00

== Players drafted into the NHL ==
=== 1987 NHL entry draft ===
= NHL All-Star team	= NHL All-Star	= NHL All-Star and NHL All-Star team	= Did not play in the NHL

Round	Pick	Player	NHL team
3	63	Geoff Smith†	Edmonton Oilers
6	108	Garry Valk†	Vancouver Canucks
6	113	Mike McCormick†	Chicago Blackhawks
10	201	David Marvin†	St. Louis Blues
12	233	Neil Eisenhut†	Vancouver Canucks

† incoming freshman

=== 1987 NHL Supplemental Draft ===
= Did not play in the NHL

Pick	Player	NHL team
5	Mike LaMoine	Detroit Red Wings
18	Steve Johnson	Vancouver Canucks

== See also ==
- 1987 NCAA Division I Men's Ice Hockey Tournament
- List of NCAA Division I Men's Ice Hockey Tournament champions
