= North Dakota Fighting Hawks men's ice hockey statistical leaders =

The North Dakota Fighting Hawks men's ice hockey statistical leaders are individual statistical leaders of the North Dakota Fighting Hawks men's ice hockey program in various categories, including goals, assists, points, and saves. Within those areas, the lists identify single-game, single-season, and career leaders. The Fighting Hawks represent the University of North Dakota in the NCAA's National Collegiate Hockey Conference.

North Dakota began competing in intercollegiate ice hockey in 1929. These lists are updated through the end of the 2020–21 season.

== Goals ==
Career
Rk	Player	Goals	Seasons
1	Ben Cherski	131	1951–52 1952–53 1953–54 1954–55
2	Dixon Ward	110	1988–89 1989–90 1990–91 1991–92
3	Bob Joyce	101	1984–85 1985–86 1986–87
4	Phil Sykes	98	1978–79 1979–80 1980–81 1981–82
5	Mark Taylor	97	1976–77 1977–78 1978–79 1979–80
	Bill Reichart	97	1954–55 1955–56 1956–57
7	Russ Romaniuk	93	1988–89 1989–90 1990–91
8	Doug Smail	89	1977–78 1978–79 1979–80
9	Ryan Duncan	85	2005–06 2006–07 2007–08 2008–09
	Cary Eades	85	1978–79 1979–80 1980–81 1981–82

Season
Rk	Player	Goals	Season
1	Bob Joyce	52	1986–87
2	Tony Hrkac	46	1986–87
3	Doug Smail	43	1979–80
4	Russ Romaniuk	40	1990–91
	Ben Cherski	40	1953–54
6	Phil Sykes	39	1981–82
7	Ben Cherski	38	1951–52
8	Jim Archibald	37	1984–85
9	Matt Frattin	36	2010–11
	Russ Romaniuk	36	1989–90
	Bill Reichart	36	1956–57

Single Game
Rk	Player	Goals	Season	Opponent
1	Bill Sullivan	8	1947–48	North Dakota State

== Assists ==
Career
Rk	Player	Assists	Seasons
1	Greg Johnson	198	1989–90 1990–91 1991–92 1992–93
2	Mark Taylor	168	1976–77 1977–78 1978–79 1979–80
3	Jeff Panzer	148	1997–98 1998–99 1999–00 2000–01
4	Rick Zaparniuk	125	1976–77 1977–78 1978–79 1979–80
5	Lee Davidson	122	1986–87 1987–88 1988–89 1989–90
6	Steve Johnson	121	1984–85 1985–86 1986–87 1987–88
	Bill Himmelright	121	1975–76 1976–77 1977–78 1978–79
8	Russ Parent	115	1986–87 1987–88 1988–89 1989–90
9	Dixon Ward	109	1988–89 1989–90 1990–91 1991–92
	Brian Williams	109	1982–83 1983–84 1984–85 1985–86

Season
Rk	Player	Assists	Season
1	Tony Hrkac	70	1986–87
2	Greg Johnson	61	1990–91
3	Mark Taylor	59	1979–80
	Mark Taylor	59	1978–79
5	Jeff Panzer	55	2000–01
6	Greg Johnson	54	1991–92
7	Steve Johnson	51	1987–88
	Kevin Maxwell	51	1978–79
9	Russ Parent	50	1989–90
10	Lee Davidson	49	1989–90

Single Game
Rk	Player	Assists	Season	Opponent
1	Bill Himmelright	6	1976–77	Colorado College
	Doug Smail	6	1977–78	Michigan State

== Points ==
Career
Rk	Player	Points	Seasons
1	Greg Johnson	272	1989–90 1990–91 1991–92 1992–93
2	Mark Taylor	265	1976–77 1977–78 1978–79 1979–80
3	Jeff Panzer	228	1997–98 1998–99 1999–00 2000–01
4	Dixon Ward	219	1988–89 1989–90 1990–91 1991–92
5	Lee Davidson	202	1986–87 1987–88 1988–89 1989–90
6	Doug Smail	195	1977–78 1978–79 1979–80
7	Steve Johnson	191	1984–85 1985–86 1986–87 1987–88
8	Ben Cherski	188	1951–52 1952–53 1953–54 1954–55
	Phil Sykes	188	1978–79 1979–80 1980–81 1981–82
10	Rick Zaparniuk	185	1976–77 1977–78 1978–79 1979–80

Season
Rk	Player	Points	Season
1	Tony Hrkac	116	1986–87
2	Mark Taylor	92	1979–80
3	Bob Joyce	89	1986–87
4	Doug Smail	87	1979–80
5	Steve Johnson	85	1987–88
6	Mark Taylor	83	1978–79
7	Kevin Maxwell	82	1978–79
8	Jeff Panzer	81	2000–01
9	Greg Johnson	79	1990–91
10	Troy Murray	78	1980–81

Single Game
Rk	Player	Points	Season	Opponent
1	Bill Reichart	9	1954–55	Minnesota Duluth
	Bob Joyce	9	1986–87	Michigan Tech

== Saves ==
Career
Rk	Player	Saves	Seasons
1	Peter Waselovich	3,517	1973–74 1974–75 1975–76 1976–77
2	Toby Kvalevog	2,936	1993–94 1994–95 1995–96 1996–97
3	Karl Goehring	2,783	1997–98 1998–99 1999–00 2000–01
4	Jean-Philippe Lamoureux	2,656	2004–05 2005–06 2006–07 2007–08
5	Bill Stankoven	2,466	1975–76 1976–77 1977–78 1978–79
6	Scott Brower	2,433	1984–85 1985–86 1986–87 1987–88
7	Zane McIntyre	2,384	2012–13 2013–14 2014–15
8	Jon Casey	2,306	1980–81 1981–82 1982–83 1983–84
9	Brad Eidsness	2,287	2008–09 2009–10 2010–11 2011–12
10	Cam Johnson	2,214	2014–15 2015–16 2016–17 2017–18

Season
Rk	Player	Saves	Season
1	Jon Casey	1,160	1983–84
2	Peter Waselovich	1,126	1973–74
3	Zane McIntyre	1,111	2014–15
4	Jean-Philippe Lamoureux	1,004	2007–08
5	Brad Eidsness	1,001	2008–09
6	Peter Waselovich	989	1974–75
7	Jordan Parise	968	2005–06
8	Toby Kvalevog	925	1994–95
9	Jean-Philippe Lamoureux	919	2006–07
10	Brad Eidsness	891	2009–10

Single Game
Rk	Player	Saves	Season	Opponent
1	Darren Jensen	56	1981–82	Minnesota
