= Bob Joyce (ice hockey) =

Canadian ice hockey player (born 1966)

- Born: July 11, 1966 (age 60) Saint John, New Brunswick, Canada
- Height: 6 ft 1 in (185 cm)
- Weight: 190 lb (86 kg; 13 st 8 lb)
- Position: Left wing
- Shot: Left
- Played for: Boston Bruins; Washington Capitals; Winnipeg Jets
- NHL draft: 82nd overall, 1984; Boston Bruins
- Playing career: 1988–2000

Robert Thomas Joyce (born July 11, 1966) is a former Canadian ice hockey player who played six seasons in the National Hockey League (NHL) for the Boston Bruins, Washington Capitals and Winnipeg Jets between 1988 and 1993. He was drafted by the Bruins in the fourth round (82nd overall) in the 1984 NHL entry draft from the University of North Dakota.

== Playing career ==
=== College ===
Joyce played for the Fighting Sioux at the University of North Dakota from 1984-1987. During his final season with the team, he played alongside Tony Hrkac and Ed Belfour on a team nicknamed the "Hrkas Circus" due to their high-scoring prowess. They helped lead the team to a 40-8-0 record (an NCAA record at the time), and Joyce set the school record of 52 goals. The team went on to win its seventh WCHA title and the NCAA Tournament to secure their fifth national title.

=== Career notes ===
- As a member of the Boston Bruins, Joyce played in the famous black-out game at Boston Garden during the 1987–88 Stanley Cup finals against the Edmonton Oilers, May 24, 1988.
- Joyce made the Canadian Olympic Team for Calgary, 1988, playing only two hours away from his home.

== Career statistics ==
=== Regular season and playoffs ===
			Regular season					Playoffs
Season	Team	League	GP	G	A	Pts	PIM	GP	G	A	Pts	PIM
1981–82	Notre Dame Hounds AAA	SMHL	—	—	—	—	—	—	—	—	—	—
1982–83	Notre Dame Hounds AAA	SMHL	—	—	—	—	—	—	—	—	—	—
1983–84	Notre Dame Hounds AAA	SMHL	30	33	37	70	—	20	13	14	27	—
1984–85	University of North Dakota	WCHA	41	18	16	34	10	—	—	—	—	—
1985–86	University of North Dakota	WCHA	38	31	28	59	40	—	—	—	—	—
1986–87	University of North Dakota	WCHA	48	52	37	89	42	—	—	—	—	—
1987–88	Canadian National Team	Intl	50	13	10	23	28	—	—	—	—	—
1987–88	Boston Bruins	NHL	15	7	5	12	10	23	8	6	14	18
1988–89	Boston Bruins	NHL	77	18	31	49	46	9	5	2	7	2
1989–90	Boston Bruins	NHL	23	1	2	3	22	—	—	—	—	—
1989–90	Washington Capitals	NHL	24	5	8	13	4	14	2	1	3	9
1990–91	Washington Capitals	NHL	17	3	3	6	8	—	—	—	—	—
1990–91	Baltimore Skipjacks	AHL	36	10	8	18	14	6	1	0	1	4
1991–92	Winnipeg Jets	NHL	1	0	0	0	0	—	—	—	—	—
1991–92	Moncton Hawks	AHL	66	19	29	48	51	10	0	5	5	9
1992–93	Winnipeg Jets	NHL	1	0	0	0	0	—	—	—	—	—
1992–93	Moncton Hawks	AHL	75	25	32	57	52	5	0	0	0	2
1993–94	Las Vegas Thunder	IHL	65	15	18	33	45	5	2	1	3	8
1994–95	Las Vegas Thunder	IHL	60	15	12	27	52	10	4	3	7	26
1995–96	Orlando Solar Bears	IHL	55	7	11	18	81	18	2	1	3	12
1996–97	Orlando Solar Bears	IHL	66	15	33	48	98	5	0	0	0	2
1997–98	Düsseldorfer EG	DEL	39	6	7	13	26	3	0	1	1	6
1998–99	EV Landshut	DEL	51	4	11	15	26	3	0	0	0	0
1999–2000	München Barons	DEL	42	4	4	8	34	4	1	2	3	2
NHL totals			158	34	49	83	90	46	15	9	24	29
AHL totals			177	54	69	123	117	21	1	5	6	15
IHL totals			254	52	74	126	276	38	8	5	13	48

=== International ===
Year	Team	Event	GP	G	A	Pts	PIM
1988	Canada	OG	4	1	0	1	0
Senior totals			4	1	0	1	0

== Awards and honours ==
Award	Year	Ref
College
All-WCHA First Team	1986–87	
AHCA West First-Team All-American	1986–87	
All-NCAA All-Tournament Team	1987	
University of North Dakota Athletics Hall of Fame	2005	
