= 1987 NCAA Division I men's ice hockey tournament =

- Teams: 8
- Finals site: Joe Louis Arena, Detroit, Michigan
- Champions: North Dakota Fighting Sioux (5th title)
- Runner-up: Michigan State Spartans (4th title game)
- Semifinalists: Minnesota Golden Gophers (12th Frozen Four); Harvard Crimson (10th Frozen Four)
- Winning coach: Gino Gasparini (3rd title)
- MOP: Tony Hrkac (North Dakota)
- Attendance: 36,251

The 1987 NCAA Division I men's ice hockey tournament was the culmination of the 1986–87 NCAA Division I men's ice hockey season, the 40th such tournament in NCAA history. It was held between March 20 and 28, 1987, and concluded with North Dakota defeating Michigan State 5-3. All Quarterfinals matchups were held at home team venues while all succeeding games were played at the Joe Louis Arena in Detroit, Michigan.

== Qualifying teams ==
The NCAA permitted 8 teams to qualify for the tournament and divided its qualifiers into two regions (East and West). Each of the tournament champions from the four Division I conferences (CCHA, ECAC, Hockey East and WCHA) received automatic invitations into the tournament with At-large bids making up the remaining 4 teams, 1 from each conference.

East							West						
Seed	School	Conference	Record	Berth type	Appearance	Last bid	Seed	School	Conference	Record	Berth type	Appearance	Last bid
1	Boston College	Hockey East	30–7–0	Tournament champion	15th	1986	1	North Dakota	WCHA	36–8–0	Tournament champion	11th	1984
2	Harvard	ECAC Hockey	26–4–0	Tournament champion	12th	1986	2	Michigan State	CCHA	30–9–2	Tournament champion	9th	1986
3	Maine	Hockey East	24–14–2	At-large bid	1st	Never	3	Bowling Green	CCHA	33–8–2	At-large bid	6th	1984
4	St. Lawrence	ECAC Hockey	24–9–0	At-large bid	9th	1983	4	Minnesota	WCHA	32–12–1	At-large bid	14th	1986

== Format ==
The tournament featured three rounds of play. The two odd-number ranked teams from one region were placed into a bracket with the two even-number ranked teams of the other region. The teams were then seeded according to their ranking. In the Quarterfinals the first and fourth seeds and the second and third seeds played two-game aggregate series to determine which school advanced to the Semifinals. Beginning with the Semifinals all games were played at the Joe Louis Arena and all series became Single-game eliminations. The winning teams in the semifinals advanced to the National Championship Game with the losers playing in a Third Place game.

== Tournament bracket ==
Quarterfinals; March 20–21
E1	Boston College	1	3	4
W4	Minnesota	4	2	6
W2	Michigan State	6	5	11
E3	Maine	2	3	5
W1	North Dakota	3	6	9
E4	St. Lawrence	1	3	4
E2	Harvard	7	3	10
W3	Bowling Green	1	0	1

Semifinals; March 26–27
W4	Minnesota	3
W2	Michigan State	5
W1	North Dakota	5
E2	Harvard	2

National championship March 28
W2	Michigan State	3
W1	North Dakota	5
Third-place game
W4	Minnesota	6
E2	Harvard	3

Note: * denotes overtime period(s)

=== Quarterfinals ===
==== (E1) Boston College vs. (W4) Minnesota ====
March 20	Boston College	1 – 4	Minnesota	McHugh Forum	Recap
(Leetch) Ken Hodge Jr. - 19:26		First period	14:00 - Dave Snuggerud (Grannis)
No scoring		Second period	15:36 - PP GW - Tom Chorske (Skarda, Cates); 19:01 - Tom Chorske (Skarda, MacSwain)
No scoring		Third period	17:12 - Dave Snuggerud (unassisted)
(30 saves / 34 shots) David Littman		Goalie stats	John Blue (42 saves / 43 shots)

March 21	Boston College	3 – 2	Minnesota	McHugh Forum	Recap
(Brown, Sweeney) Craig Janney - 08:46 (Stevens) Ken Hodge Jr. - 10:27		First period	No scoring
(Leetch) Craig Janney - PP GW - 07:12		Second period	No scoring
No scoring		Third period	01:01 - Peter Hankinson (Bergland); 13:21 - Dave Snuggerud (Grannis)
(27 saves / 29 shots) Shaun Real		Goalie stats	John Blue (36 saves / 39 shots)

Minnesota won series 6–4

==== (E2) Harvard vs. (W3) Bowling Green ====
March 20	Harvard	7 – 1	Bowling Green	Bright Hockey Center	Recap
(Caplan, Biotti) Steve Armstrong – 01:27 (Taylor, Bourbeau) Lane MacDonald – GW PP – 04:51 (Armstrong, Caplan) Don Sweeney – PP – 16:41		First period	No scoring
(unassisted) C. J. Young – 03:09 (Barakett, Sweeney) C. J. Young – 08:00 (MacDonald, Barakett) Allen Bourbeau – PP – 11:37		Second period	18:32 – PP – Iain Duncan (Emerson, Barber)
(Taylor, Bourbeau) Tim Barakett – PP – 11:07		Third period	No scoring
( 29 saves / 30 shots ) Dickie McEvoy		Goalie stats	Gary Kruzich ( 34 saves / 41 shots )

March 21	Harvard	3 – 0	Bowling Green	Bright Hockey Center	Recap
(unassised) Andy Janfaza - GW - 09:52		First period	No scoring
No scoring		Second period	No scoring
(MacDonald, Barakett) Allen Bourbeau - PP - 13:45 (Murphy, Cutone) Rick Haney - PP - 18:20		Third period	No scoring
(40 saves / 40 shots) Dickie McEvoy		Goalie stats	Gary Kruzich (22 saves / 25 shots)

Harvard won series 10–1

==== (W1) North Dakota vs. (E4) St. Lawrence ====
March 20	North Dakota	3 – 1	St. Lawrence	Winter Sports Center	Recap
(Hrkac) Lee Davidson - PP - 16:57		First period	01:17 - Dave Saunders (Mulligan, Hurlbut)
(Hrkac, Joyce) Steve Johnson - PP GW - 04:09		Second period	No scoring
(Bobyck, Hrkac) Bob Joyce - 03:01		Third period	No scoring
(38 saves / 39 shots) Ed Belfour		Goalie stats	Scott Yearwood (38 saves / 41 shots)

March 21	North Dakota	6 – 3	St. Lawrence	Winter Sports Center	Recap
(unassisted) Tony Hrkac - PP - 09:31		First period	06:38 - PP - Pete Lappin (Mann)
(Hrkac) Mal Parks - 01:35 (Joyce) Tony Hrkac - SH - 04:03 (Johnson) Lee Davidson - GW - 16:36 (Koberinski) Mike LaMoine - 18:54		Second period	16:18 - PP - Mike Hurlbut (Lammens, Baker)
(Hrkac) Bob Joyce - 12:33		Third period	08:27 - Gary Robertson (Baker, Lammens)
(30 saves / 33 shots) Ed Belfour		Goalie stats	Scott Yearwood (29 saves / 35 shots)

North Dakota won series 9–4

==== (W2) Michigan State vs. (E3) Maine ====
March 20	Michigan State	6 – 2	Maine	Munn Ice Arena
No scoring		First period	13:15 – Guy Perron (McHugh)
(Cole, Foster) Don McSween – 10:05 (unassisted) Tom Tilley – 16:41 (Kv. Miller, Hamilton) Bruce Rendall – GW – 18:07		Second period	No scoring
(Luongo, Shibicky) Mitch Messier – 07:31 (Gibson, Hoff) Brian McReynolds – 15:00 (Tilley, Ki. Miller) Kevin Miller – 15:33		Third period	02:38 – Guy Perron (Beers, Nonis)
(33 saves / 35 shots) Norm Foster		Goalie stats	Al Loring (26 saves / 32 shots)

March 21	Michigan State	5 – 3	Maine	Munn Ice Arena
(Kv. Miller) Mitch Messier – 19:15		First period	No scoring
(Kv. Miller, Rendall) Kip Miller – 09:55 (Rendall, Shibicky) Mitch Messier – 15:12		Second period	09:32 – Steve Santini (D. Capuano, Baker)
(Messier, McSween) Dave Arkeilpane – GW – 15:36 (Cole, Luongo) Bobby Reynolds – 19:28		Third period	01:57 – Todd Jenkins (Nonis); 12:10 – Todd Jenkins (Nonis)
(23 saves / 26 shots) Bob Essensa		Goalie stats	Scott King (18 saves / 23 shots)

Michigan State won series 11–5

=== Semifinal ===
==== (W1) North Dakota vs. (E2) Harvard ====
March 26	North Dakota	5 – 2	Harvard	Joe Louis Arena	Recap
(Hrkac, LaMoine) Brent Bobyck - 10:17		First period	No scoring
(Hrkac, Johnson) Bob Joyce - PP - 08:42 (Joyce) Tony Hrkac - GW - 12:37 (Johnson, Davidson) Mickey Krampotich - 17:57		Second period	No scoring
(Hrkac, Davidson) Steve Johnson - PP - 10:13		Third period	03:32 - Allen Bourbeau (unassisted); 12:29 - Tim Barakett (Armstrong)
(37 saves / 39 shots) Ed Belfour		Goalie stats	Dickie McEvoy (29 saves / 34 shots)

==== (W2) Michigan State vs. (W4) Minnesota ====
March 27	Michigan State	5 – 3	Minnesota	Joe Louis Arena
(Kv. Miller, Hamilton) Mitch Messier - PP – 01:39 (Reynolds, Luongo) Danton Cole – 04:16		First period	No scoring
(O'Toole, Cole) Neil Wilkinson – 10:05		Second period	01:08 - PP – Corey Millen (Blue); 06:27 - PP – Jay Cates (Chorske, Millen); 17:18 – Tom Chorske (unassisted)
(unassisted) Dave Arkeilpane – GW – 07:31 (Luongo) Bill Shibicky - EN – 19:04		Third period	No scoring
(27 saves / 30 shots) Norm Foster		Goalie stats	John Blue (19 saves / 23 shots)

=== Third-place game ===
==== (E2) Harvard vs. (W4) Minnesota ====
March 28	Harvard	3 – 6	Minnesota	Joe Louis Arena	Recap
No scoring		First period	12:31 - Corey Millen (Richards, Grannis)
(Barakett) Lane MacDonald - PP - 01:02 (Pawloski, Cutone) Craig Taucher - 12:13		Second period	02:33 - Marty Nanne (Pitlick); 09:02 - Corey Millen (Snuggerud); 10:22 - GW - Jay Cates (Bloom, Chorske); 13:17 - Eric Dornfeld (unassisted); 15:39 - Dave Snuggerud (Millen, Grannis)
(Bourbeau) C. J. Young - PP - 17:31		Third period	No scoring
(24 saves / 30 shots) John Devin		Goalie stats	Robb Stauber (31 saves / 34 shots)

=== National Championship ===
==== (W1) North Dakota vs. (W2) Michigan State ====
March 28	North Dakota	5 – 3	Michigan State	Joe Louis Arena

Scoring summary
Period	Team	Goal	Assist(s)	Time	Score
1st	UND	Ian Kidd – PP	Joyce	15:07	1–0 UND
1st	UND	Murray Baron	Bowen and Kidd	16:44	2–0 UND
1st	UND	Bob Joyce	Kidd and Hrkac	17:02	3–0 UND
2nd	MSU	Tom Tilly	McReynolds and Messier	28:30	3–1 UND
2nd	UND	Malcolm Parks – GW	Koberinski	35:05	4–1 UND
2nd	MSU	Kevin Miller	unassisted	36:56	4–2 UND
3rd	UND	Brent Bobyck	Parent	47:54	5–2 UND
3rd	MSU	Kip Miller	Miller	58:34	5–3 UND
Penalty summary
Period	Team	Player	Penalty	Time	PIM
1st	MSU	Tom Tilley	Hooking	1:05	2:00
1st	UND	Grant Paranica	Holding	7:09	2:00
1st	MSU	Brad Hamilton	Tripping	12:45	2:00
1st	MSU	Danton Cole	Tripping	13:54	2:00
1st	UND	Tom Benson	High-sticking	18:06	2:00
2nd	UND	Scott Dub	Slashing	23:16	2:00
2nd	MSU	Brad Hamilton	Tripping	23:57	2:00
2nd	MSU	Sean Clement	Hooking	29:53	2:00
2nd	UND	Murray Baron	Cross-checking	32:55	2:00
3rd	MSU	Don Gibson	Roughing (late hit)	52:07	2:00
3rd	UND	Lee Davidson	Roughing	52:07	2:00

Shots by period
Team	1	2	3	T
Michigan State	2	8	8	18
North Dakota	8	9	6	23

Goaltenders
Team	Name	Saves	Goals against	Time on ice
MSU	Bob Essensa	18	5	60:00
UND	Ed Belfour	15	3	60:00

== All-Tournament team ==
- G: Ed Belfour (North Dakota)
- D: Ian Kidd (North Dakota)
- D: Chris Luongo (Michigan State)
- D: Don McSween (Michigan State)
- F: Tony Hrkac* (North Dakota)
- F: Bob Joyce (North Dakota)
- F: Corey Millen (Minnesota)

* Most Outstanding Player(s)
