= Russ Parent =

Canadian ice hockey player

- Born: May 6, 1968 (age 58) Winnipeg, Manitoba, Canada
- Height: 5 ft 10 in (178 cm)
- Weight: 185 lb (84 kg; 13 st 3 lb)
- Position: Defenseman
- Shot: Left
- Played for: North Dakota; Ayr Raiders; Probadge Utrecht; Basingstoke Bison; Fife Flyers; Monroe Moccasins
- National team: Canada
- NHL draft: 219th, 1986; New York Rangers
- Playing career: 1986–2001

Russ Parent (born May 6, 1968) is a Canadian retired ice hockey defenseman who was an All-American for North Dakota. Parent has served as the head coach of the Monroe Moccasins (FPHL) since 2025.

== Career ==
Parent was a high-scoring defenseman in his final season of junior hockey, recording nearly 2 points per game in 1986. The gaudy numbers convinced the New York Rangers to select him with their 11th round selection in the 1986 NHL Draft. Parent joined the program at North Dakota the following year and lucked into one of the most dominant performances by any team I the history of college hockey. UND became the first team to win 40 games and were led by all-time single-season scoring champion Tony Hrkac as well as future Hall of Famer Ed Belfour. The Fighting Sioux won the National Championship with Parent serving mostly as a depth defender.

With many of the principle players leaving after the season, North Dakota declined sharply after 1987. parent remained with the team for the next three seasons, trying to rebuild the team into a contender. The Fighting Hawks finally began to resemble a championship team in his senior season. While serving as an alternate captain, Parent led the nation in points (tied) and assists by a defenseman and was named an All-American. Parent helped the Sioux return to the national tournament again but they were knocked out in the first round. He finished out the season with three games for the Canadian national team.

Parent began his professional career the following season after heading to Europe. He played for the Ayr Raiders in final two seasons for the team and then transferred to the Basingstoke Bison. In his first season he produced more than two points per game and helped the team qualify for the British Hockey League. He continued to be a key contributor for the Bison for the next three years and is still fondly remembered by supporters of the club. He moved on to the Fife Flyers for the 1997 season and helped the team win a league championship.

After a successful career in the UK, Parent returned across the Atlantic and played four years of AA hockey with the Monroe Moccasins. He retired following the 2001 season.

== Statistics ==
=== Regular season and playoffs ===
			Regular Season					Playoffs
Season	Team	League	GP	G	A	Pts	PIM	GP	G	A	Pts	PIM
1984–85	Winnipeg South Blues	MJHL	—	—	—	—	—	—	—	—	—	—
1985–86	Winnipeg South Blues	MJHL	47	16	65	81	106	—	—	—	—	—
1986–87	North Dakota	WCHA	47	2	17	19	50	—	—	—	—	—
1987–88	North Dakota	WCHA	30	4	20	24	38	—	—	—	—	—
1988–89	North Dakota	WCHA	40	9	28	37	51	—	—	—	—	—
1989–90	North Dakota	WCHA	45	9	50	59	86	—	—	—	—	—
1989–90	Team Canada	International	3	0	0	0	0	—	—	—	—	—
1990–91	Ayr Bruins	BHL	15	6	21	27	22	—	—	—	—	—
1991–92	Probadge Utrecht	Eredivisie	21	5	10	15	12	—	—	—	—	—
1991–92	Ayr Raiders	BHL	15	5	10	15	100	6	9	9	18	8
1992–93	Basingstoke Beavers	BD1	32	19	55	74	42	6	1	7	8	10
1993–94	Basingstoke Beavers	BHL	44	18	38	56	50	—	—	—	—	—
1994–95	Basingstoke Beavers	BHL	40	28	35	63	50	6	5	5	10	4
1995–96	Basingstoke Bison	BHL	31	3	9	12	26	6	1	1	2	6
1996–97	Fife Flyers	BNL	26	24	39	63	57	12	10	13	23	16
1997–98	Monroe Moccasins	WPHL	69	12	29	41	72	—	—	—	—	—
1998–99	Monroe Moccasins	WPHL	69	10	27	37	54	6	0	1	1	0
1999–00	Monroe Moccasins	WPHL	69	6	36	42	28	2	0	0	0	0
2000–01	Monroe Moccasins	WPHL	70	8	41	49	24	—	—	—	—	—
NCAA totals			162	24	115	139	225	—	—	—	—	—
BHL totals			145	60	113	173	248	18	15	15	30	18
WPHL totals			277	36	133	169	178	8	0	1	1	0

== Awards and honors ==
Award	Year
All-WCHA Second Team	1988–89
All-WCHA First Team	1989–90
AHCA West First-Team All-American	1989–90
