= Scott Yearwood =

Canadian ice hockey player

- Born: July 20, 1963 (age 62) Moncton, New Brunswick, Canada
- Height: 5 ft 10 in (178 cm)
- Weight: 160 lb (73 kg; 11 st 6 lb)
- Position: Goaltender
- Played for: St. Lawrence
- Playing career: 1984–1987

Scott Yearwood is a Canadian retired ice hockey goaltender who was an All-American for St. Lawrence.

== Career ==
Yearwood began attending St. Lawrence University in 1983 but didn't play with the ice hockey team until the following year. He was a serviceable goaltender in his first two seasons as a starter but the team improved mightily in his senior season. Yearwood's goals against average dropped by more than a full point and he finished in the top 5 in the nation. He was named an All-American while helping the Saints to their best finish in decades. In the ECAC Tournament, St. Lawrence made the championship game for the first time in 22 years and, though they lost, the team earned a bid to the NCAA Tournament. The Larries had the misfortune to be set against the #1 seed and fell to eventual champion North Dakota. While Yearwood still have a year of eligibility left, he graduated in 1987 and was invited to Montreal's training camp. Nothing came to fruition and he retired as a player.

He moved to Ontario and began working as a sales representative. He spent several years as a senior account manager and eventually worked his way up to becoming a vice president for Redwolf Security.

== Statistics ==
=== Regular season and playoffs ===
			Regular season									Playoffs
Season	Team	League	GP	W	L	T	MIN	GA	SO	GAA	SV%	GP	W	L	MIN	GA	SO	GAA	SV%
1979–80	Etobicoke Selects	MJBHL	3	—	—	—	150	13	0	5.20	—	—	—	—	—	—	—	—	—
1982–83	North York Rangers	OJHL	7	—	—	—	—	—	—	—	—	—	—	—	—	—	—	—	—
1983–84	Dixie Beehives	OJHL	42	18	6	3	1635	117	1	4.30	—	—	—	—	—	—	—	—	—
1984–85	St. Lawrence	ECAC Hockey	21	—	—	—	—	—	—	3.43	.899	—	—	—	—	—	—	—	—
1985–86	St. Lawrence	ECAC Hockey	24	—	—	—	—	—	—	4.29	.880	—	—	—	—	—	—	—	—
1986–87	St. Lawrence	ECAC Hockey	28	—	—	—	1456	72	1	2.94	.905	—	—	—	—	—	—	—	—
NCAA totals			73	37	28	1	3941	233	—	3.54	.894	—	—	—	—	—	—	—	—

== Awards and honors ==
Award	Year
All-ECAC Hockey Second Team	1986–87
AHCA East Second-Team All-American	1986–87
