= Corey Millen =

American ice hockey player (born 1964)

- Born: March 30, 1964 (age 62) Cloquet, Minnesota, U.S.
- Height: 5 ft 7 in (170 cm)
- Weight: 170 lb (77 kg; 12 st 2 lb)
- Position: Center
- Shot: Right
- Played for: HC Ambri-Piotta; New York Rangers; Los Angeles Kings; New Jersey Devils; Dallas Stars; Calgary Flames; Kölner Haie; HC Lugano
- National team: United States
- NHL draft: 57th overall, 1982; New York Rangers
- Playing career: 1987–2004

Corey Eugene Millen (born March 30, 1964) is an American former professional ice hockey center. He played in the National Hockey League (NHL) between 1990 and 1997 with five teams. Internationally he played for the American national team at several tournaments, including the 1984 and 1988 Winter Olympics. In 2020, he was named the head coach of the St. Cloud Norsemen in the North American Hockey League (NAHL).

== Career ==
=== NHL ===
Millen played for the University of Minnesota after being selected by the New York Rangers in the 1982 NHL entry draft.

Millen started his National Hockey League career with the Rangers in 1990 where he appeared in four games. He also played for the Los Angeles Kings, New Jersey Devils, Dallas Stars and Calgary Flames. He was sent to the Calgary Flames along with Jarome Iginla in the trade which sent Joe Nieuwendyk to the Dallas Stars. He left the NHL after the 1997 season.

=== Europe ===
After playing four years with the University of Minnesota, Millen moved to Europe for the first time, where he played in the Swiss Nationalliga A from 1987 to 1989 along with Dale McCourt, wearing the jersey of HC Ambri-Piotta. At the end of this period he moved back to the U.S. where he started his NHL career with the Rangers.

In 1997 Millen joined the Cologne Sharks of Germany's Deutsche Eishockey Liga. He played in Cologne until the end of the 2001–02 season. In 2002–03 he moved to Switzerland and joined HC Lugano of the Nationalliga A for one season and spent a second season with Nationalliga B team EHC Visp before retiring from hockey in 2004.

=== Coaching ===
In 2011, Millen became the head coach of the Alaska Avalanche in the North American Hockey League (NAHL). He then was head coach of the Minnesota Wilderness in the NAHL from 2013 to 2016.

Millen became the head coach of the St. Cloud Norsemen in the NAHL in 2020 and is presently coaching there.

== Career statistics ==
=== Regular season and playoffs ===
			Regular season					Playoffs
Season	Team	League	GP	G	A	Pts	PIM	GP	G	A	Pts	PIM
1980–81	Cloquet High School	HS-MN	—	—	—	—	—	—	—	—	—	—
1981–82	Cloquet High School	HSMN	18	46	33	79	—	—	—	—	—	—
1982–83	University of Minnesota	WCHA	21	14	15	29	18	—	—	—	—	—
1984–85	University of Minnesota	WCHA	38	28	36	64	60	—	—	—	—	—
1985–86	University of Minnesota	WCHA	48	41	42	83	64	—	—	—	—	—
1986–87	University of Minnesota	WCHA	42	36	29	65	62	—	—	—	—	—
1987–88	HC Ambrì–Piotta	NDA	5	2	4	6	5	6	8	5	13	4
1988–89	HC Ambrì–Piotta	NDA	36	32	28	60	119	6	4	3	7	18
1989–90	New York Rangers	NHL	4	0	0	0	2	—	—	—	—	—
1989–90	Flint Spirits	IHL	11	4	5	9	2	—	—	—	—	—
1990–91	New York Rangers	NHL	4	3	1	4	0	6	1	2	3	0
1990–91	Binghamton Rangers	AHL	40	19	37	56	68	6	0	7	7	8
1991–92	New York Rangers	NHL	11	1	4	5	10	—	—	—	—	—
1991–92	Binghamton Rangers	AHL	15	8	7	15	44	—	—	—	—	—
1991–92	Los Angeles Kings	NHL	46	20	21	41	44	6	0	1	1	6
1992–93	Los Angeles Kings	NHL	42	23	16	39	42	23	4	2	6	12
1993–94	New Jersey Devils	NHL	78	20	30	50	52	7	1	0	1	2
1994–95	New Jersey Devils	NHL	17	2	3	5	8	—	—	—	—	—
1994–95	Dallas Stars	NHL	28	3	15	18	28	5	1	0	1	2
1995–96	Dallas Stars	NHL	13	3	4	7	8	—	—	—	—	—
1995–96	Michigan K–Wings	IHL	11	8	11	19	14	—	—	—	—	—
1995–96	Calgary Flames	NHL	31	4	10	14	10	—	—	—	—	—
1996–97	Calgary Flames	NHL	61	11	15	26	32	—	—	—	—	—
1997–98	Kölner Haie	DEL	27	15	16	31	46	3	2	1	3	6
1998–99	Kölner Haie	DEL	48	26	39	65	153	5	2	2	4	37
1999–00	Kölner Haie	DEL	38	17	32	49	52	10	4	3	7	16
2000–01	Kölner Haie	DEL	59	34	28	62	127	3	0	0	0	27
2001–02	Kölner Haie	DEL	57	22	24	46	156	13	6	5	11	36
2002–03	HC Lugano	NLA	31	10	9	19	53	—	—	—	—	—
2002–03	EHC Visp	NLB	—	—	—	—	—	2	0	0	0	0
DEL totals			229	114	139	253	534	34	14	11	25	122
NHL totals			335	90	119	209	236	47	5	7	12	22

=== International ===
Year	Team	Event	GP	G	A	Pts	PIM
1982	United States	WJC	7	2	4	6	4
1984	United States	OLY	6	0	0	0	2
1987	United States	CC	1	1	0	1	0
1988	United States	OLY	6	6	5	11	4
1998	United States	WC Q	3	3	0	3	4
Junior totals			7	2	4	6	4
Senior totals			16	10	5	15	10

== Awards and honors ==
Award	Year
All-WCHA Second Team	1984–85
All-WCHA Second Team	1985–86
AHCA West Second-Team All-American	1985–86
All-WCHA Second Team	1986–87
All-NCAA All-Tournament Team	1987
