= 1987 CCHA men's ice hockey tournament =

Sports tournament

1987 CCHA Men's ice hockey tournament
- Dates: March 6–14, 1987
- Teams: 8
- Finals site: Joe Louis Arena; Detroit, Michigan
- Champions: Michigan State (5th title)
- Winning coach: Ron Mason (8th title)
- MVP: Bobby Reynolds (Michigan State)
- CCHA Men's Ice Hockey Tournaments

The 1987 CCHA Men's Ice Hockey Tournament was the 16th CCHA Men's Ice Hockey Tournament. It was played between March 6 and March 14, 1987. First round games were played at campus sites, while 'final four' games were played at Joe Louis Arena in Detroit, Michigan. By winning the tournament, Michigan State received the Central Collegiate Hockey Association's automatic bid to the 1987 NCAA Division I Men's Ice Hockey Tournament.

== Format ==
The tournament featured three rounds of play. The team that finished below eighth place in the standings was not eligible for postseason play. In the quarterfinals, the first and eighth seeds, the second and seventh seeds, the third seed and sixth seeds and the fourth seed and fifth seeds played a best-of-three series, with the winners advancing to the semifinals. In the semifinals, the remaining highest and lowest seeds and second highest and second lowest seeds play a single-game, with the winners advancing to the finals. The tournament champion receives an automatic bid to the 1987 NCAA Division I Men's Ice Hockey Tournament.

== Conference standings ==
Note: GP = Games played; W = Wins; L = Losses; T = Ties; PTS = Points; GF = Goals For; GA = Goals Against

1986–87 Central Collegiate Hockey Association standings
	Conference							Overall					
	GP	W	L	T	PTS	GF	GA	GP	W	L	T	GF	GA
Bowling Green†	32	24	6	2	50	181	121	45	33	10	2	238	160
Michigan State*	32	23	8	1	47	163	117	45	33	10	2	231	156
Lake Superior State	32	19	11	2	40	143	130	40	22	16	2	181	168
Illinois-Chicago	32	18	13	1	37	148	118	39	21	17	1	176	154
Western Michigan	32	16	16	0	32	155	144	43	23	20	0	219	187
Ohio State	32	12	19	1	25	132	168	43	19	23	1	188	211
Michigan	32	11	20	1	23	153	174	40	14	25	1	188	220
Ferris State	32	9	23	0	18	114	152	43	16	27	0	157	197
Miami	32	8	24	0	16	127	192	39	8	31	0	151	232
Championship: Michigan State † indicates conference regular season champion * indicates conference tournament champion

== Bracket ==
Quarterfinals; March 6–8
1	Bowling Green	4	5	5
8	Ferris State	6	0	1
2	Michigan State	8*	6	–
7	Michigan	7	3	–
(Pairings are reseeded after the first round)
3	Lake Superior State	8	2	4
6	Ohio State	5	5	8
4	Illinois–Chicago	2	6	1
5	Western Michigan	3*	4	5

Semifinals; March 12
1	Bowling Green	5
6	Ohio State	3
2	Michigan State	6
5	Western Michigan	3

Championship; March 14
1	Bowling Green	3
2	Michigan State	4*
Consolation Game
5	Western Michigan	4
6	Ohio State	7

Note: * denotes overtime period(s)

=== First round ===
==== (1) Bowling Green vs. (8) Ferris State ====
Bowling Green	4 – 6	Ferris State	BGSU Ice Arena

Bowling Green	5 – 0	Ferris State	BGSU Ice Arena

Bowling Green	5 – 1	Ferris State	BGSU Ice Arena

Bowling Green won series 2–1

==== (2) Michigan State vs. (7) Michigan ====
Michigan State	8 – 7	OT	Michigan	Munn Ice Arena

Michigan State	6 – 3	Michigan	Munn Ice Arena

Michigan State won series 2–0

==== (3) Lake Superior State vs. (6) Ohio State ====
Lake Superior State	8 – 5	Ohio State	Taffy Abel Arena

Lake Superior State	3 – 5	Ohio State	Taffy Abel Arena

Lake Superior State	8 – 4	Ohio State	Taffy Abel Arena

Ohio State won series 2–1

==== (4) Illinois–Chicago vs. (5) Western Michigan ====
Illinois–Chicago	2 – 3	OT	Western Michigan	UIC Pavilion

Illinois–Chicago	6 – 4	Western Michigan	UIC Pavilion

Illinois–Chicago	1 – 5	Western Michigan	UIC Pavilion

Western Michigan won series 2–1

=== Semifinals ===
==== (1) Bowling Green vs. (6) Ohio State ====
March 12	Bowling Green	5 – 3	Ohio State	Joe Louis Arena

==== (2) Michigan State vs. (5) Western Michigan ====
March 12	Michigan State	6 – 3	Western Michigan	Joe Louis Arena

=== Consolation Game ===
==== (5) Western Michigan vs. (6) Ohio State ====
March 14	Western Michigan	4 – 7	Ohio State	Joe Louis Arena

=== Championship ===
==== (1) Bowling Green vs. (2) Michigan State ====
March 14	Bowling Green	3 – 4	OT	Michigan State	Joe Louis Arena

== Tournament awards ==
=== All-Tournament Team ===
- F Bobby Reynolds* (Michigan State)
- F Jeff Madill (Ohio State)
- F Paul Ysebaert (Bowling Green)
- D Donald McSween (Michigan State)
- D Scott Paluch (Bowling Green)
- G Gary Kruzich (Bowling Green)

* Most Valuable Player(s)
