= Russ Romaniuk =

Canadian ice hockey player

- Born: June 9, 1970 (age 56) Winnipeg, Manitoba, Canada
- Height: 6 ft 1 in (185 cm)
- Weight: 200 lb (91 kg; 14 st 4 lb)
- Position: Left wing
- Shot: Left
- Played for: Winnipeg Jets; Philadelphia Flyers
- NHL draft: 31st overall, 1988; Winnipeg Jets
- Playing career: 1991–2005

Russell James Romaniuk (born June 9, 1970) is a Canadian former professional ice hockey left winger who played in the National Hockey League (NHL) for the Winnipeg Jets and Philadelphia Flyers. He is currently co-presenting the CJOB Moose Hockey show.

== Playing career ==
Romaniuk was born in Winnipeg, Manitoba. Drafted 31st overall by his hometown Jets in the 1988 NHL entry draft, Romaniuk played 102 regular season games, scoring 13 goals and 14 assists for 27 points, collecting 63 penalty minutes.

Romaniuk spent the last few years of his career playing in Europe, playing in Germany for the Nürnberg Ice Tigers, in Italy for Brunico SG, and for the British Ice Hockey Superleague for the Manchester Storm, and the Cardiff Devils in the British National League and the Elite Ice Hockey League before retiring in 2005.

== Career statistics ==
=== Regular season and playoffs ===
			Regular season					Playoffs
Season	Team	League	GP	G	A	Pts	PIM	GP	G	A	Pts	PIM
1984–85	St. Boniface Saints	MJHL	38	46	34	80	46	—	—	—	—	—
1988–89	University of North Dakota	NCAA	39	17	14	31	32	—	—	—	—	—
1989–90	University of North Dakota	NCAA	45	36	15	51	54	—	—	—	—	—
1990–91	University of North Dakota	NCAA	39	40	28	68	30	—	—	—	—	—
1991–92	Winnipeg Jets	NHL	27	3	5	8	18	—	—	—	—	—
1991–92	Moncton Hawks	AHL	45	16	15	31	25	10	5	4	9	19
1992–93	Winnipeg Jets	NHL	28	3	1	4	22	1	0	0	0	0
1992–93	Moncton Hawks	AHL	28	18	8	26	40	5	0	4	4	2
1992–93	Fort Wayne Komets	IHL	4	2	0	2	7	—	—	—	—	—
1993–94	Winnipeg Jets	NHL	24	4	8	12	6	—	—	—	—	—
1993–94	Moncton Hawks	AHL	18	16	8	24	24	17	2	6	8	30
1994–95	Winnipeg Jets	NHL	6	0	0	0	0	—	—	—	—	—
1994–95	Springfield Falcons	AHL	17	5	7	12	29	—	—	—	—	—
1995–96	Philadelphia Flyers	NHL	17	3	0	3	17	1	0	0	0	0
1995–96	Hershey Bears	AHL	27	19	10	29	43	—	—	—	—	—
1996–97	Manitoba Moose	IHL	46	14	13	27	43	—	—	—	—	—
1997–98	Manitoba Moose	IHL	5	0	1	1	8	—	—	—	—	—
1997–98	Long Beach Ice Dogs	IHL	49	16	11	27	43	—	—	—	—	—
1997–98	Las Vegas Thunder	IHL	22	6	4	10	10	4	2	2	4	4
1998–99	Las Vegas Thunder	IHL	82	43	20	63	91	—	—	—	—	—
1999–00	Nuremberg Ice Tigers	DEL	56	13	13	26	34	—	—	—	—	—
2000–01	Houston Aeros	IHL	35	5	7	12	29	—	—	—	—	—
2000–01	HC Pustertal	ITA	14	10	8	18	22	—	—	—	—	—
2001–02	Manchester Storm	BISL	46	17	14	31	14	7	1	0	1	0
2002–03	Cardiff Devils	BNL	36	23	29	52	48	10	7	5	12	22
2003–04	Cardiff Devils	EIHL	42	13	17	30	34	4	1	1	2	8
2004–05	Cardiff Devils	EIHL	30	6	11	17	53	10	3	3	6	2
NHL totals			102	13	14	27	63	2	0	0	0	0

== Awards and honors ==
Award	Year
WCHA All-Tournament Team	1990
All-WCHA First Team	1990–91
