= Scott Brower =

- Born: September 26, 1964 Viking, Alberta, Canada
- Died: October 21, 1998 (aged 34) Corpus Christi, Texas, U.S.
- Height: 5 ft 11 in (180 cm)
- Weight: 185 lb (84 kg; 13 st 3 lb)
- Position: Goaltender
- Shot: Left
- Played for: IHL; Flint Spirits; Denver Rangers; Phoenix Roadrunners; Flint Spirits; San Diego Gulls; ECHL; Erie Panthers; CHL; Memphis Riverkings; Other; Kiekko-Espoo (FNL); Peissenberg TSV (Ger.2)
- NHL draft: 12th round, 243rd overall, 1984; New York Rangers
- Playing career: 1988–1997

Scott Brower (September 26, 1964 – October 21, 1998) was an American professional ice hockey goaltender.

== Early career ==
Brower was drafted by the New York Rangers in the 12th round (243rd overall) in the 1984 NHL entry draft. As a member of the North Dakota Fighting Sioux, he was a backup to future NHL All-Star Ed Belfour.

== Professional career ==
Brower was drafted with the 243rd overall pick by the New York Rangers in the 12th round of the 1984 NHL entry draft. Although Brower never played in the NHL, he played eight professional seasons in North America and Finland before finishing his career in Germany in 1996.

Brower also played one season of major league roller hockey in the RHI with the Las Vegas Flash.

== Death ==
Brower was planning a comeback into the Central Hockey League in 1999. At the time, he was the Director of Ticket Sales for the Corpus Christi IceRays. While driving from Corpus Christi, Texas, to South Padre Island on Oct. 21, 1998, Brower's car was hit by an oncoming vehicle driven by Jose Luis Flores, who had just left a local bar. Although Brower attempted to swerve to miss the oncoming car, Flores's vehicle struck Brower head on. Brower died instantly from injuries related to the crash. Flores was found to have a blood-alcohol content level of .13 and traces of cocaine in his system.

Although he never played an official game for the IceRays, Brower's #35 (the number he was wearing at the time of his comeback) was retired by the IceRays in a pregame ceremony against the Shreveport Mudbugs

In honor of Brower, the Western Professional Hockey League renamed its top goaltender trophy the Scott Brower Memorial Trophy in his honor on Nov. 7, 1998. When the WPHL merged with the Central Hockey League in 2001, the trophy retained its name.

In addition to the IceRays retiring Brower's number, his number 31 has also been retired in Memphis by the CHL's Memphis Riverkings.

== Awards ==
- 1986-87 NCAA Championship
- October 21, 1998: Corpus Christi IceRays retire jersey #35 in his honor
- November 7, 1998: WPHL names Top Goaltender Trophy the Scott Brower Memorial Trophy
- 2001-02: WPHL merges with CHL, CHL retains Brower Memorial Trophy name
