= Ian Kidd =

American ice hockey player (born 1964)

- Born: May 11, 1964 (age 61) Gresham, Oregon, U.S.
- Height: 6 ft 1 in (185 cm)
- Weight: 194 lb (88 kg; 13 st 12 lb)
- Position: Defence
- Shot: Right
- Played for: Vancouver Canucks; Fredericton Express; Milwaukee Admirals; Cincinnati Cyclones; Chicago Wolves
- NHL draft: Undrafted
- Playing career: 1987–1995

Ian Kidd (born May 11, 1964) is an American former professional ice hockey defenseman. He played 20 games for the Vancouver Canucks of the National Hockey League (NHL) between 1987 and 1989, but spent the bulk of his professional career in the minor International Hockey League. Prior to turning professional Kidd played college hockey at the University of North Dakota, winning the NCAA championship in 1987. The Detroit Red Wings initially selected him first overall in the 1986 NHL Supplemental Draft, but the claim was invalidated after it was determined Kidd didn't meet eligibility requirements.

== Career statistics ==
=== Regular season and playoffs ===
			Regular season					Playoffs
Season	Team	League	GP	G	A	Pts	PIM	GP	G	A	Pts	PIM
1982–83	Penticton Knights	BCJHL	42	18	26	44	214	—	—	—	—	—
1983–84	Penticton Knights	BCJHL	55	31	52	83	188	—	—	—	—	—
1984–85	Penticton Knights	BCJHL	46	31	77	108	177	—	—	—	—	—
1985–86	University of North Dakota	WCHA	37	6	16	22	65	—	—	—	—	—
1986–87	University of North Dakota	WCHA	47	13	47	60	58	—	—	—	—	—
1987–88	Vancouver Canucks	NHL	19	4	7	11	25	—	—	—	—	—
1987–88	Fredericton Express	AHL	53	1	21	22	70	12	0	4	4	22
1988–89	Vancouver Canucks	NHL	1	0	0	0	0	—	—	—	—	—
1988–89	Milwaukee Admirals	IHL	76	13	40	53	124	4	0	2	2	7
1989–90	Milwaukee Admirals	IHL	65	11	36	47	86	6	2	5	7	0
1990–91	Milwaukee Admirals	IHL	72	5	26	31	41	6	0	1	1	2
1991–92	Milwaukee Admirals	IHL	80	9	24	33	75	5	0	1	1	11
1992–93	Milwaukee Admirals	IHL	32	3	10	13	36	—	—	—	—	—
1992–93	Cincinnati Cyclones	IHL	23	6	23	29	10	—	—	—	—	—
1993–94	Cincinnati Cyclones	IHL	79	8	30	38	93	8	0	3	3	10
1994–95	Cincinnati Cyclones	IHL	13	1	1	2	10	8	1	3	4	6
1994–95	Chicago Wolves	IHL	22	2	0	2	20	—	—	—	—	—
IHL totals			462	58	190	248	495	37	3	15	18	36
NHL totals			20	4	7	11	25	—	—	—	—	—

== Awards and honors ==
Award	Year
All-WCHA First Team	1986–87
AHCA West First-Team All-American	1986–87
All-NCAA All-Tournament Team	1987
