= Brent Bobyck =

Canadian ice hockey player (born 1968)

- Born: April 26, 1968 (age 58) Regina, Saskatchewan, Canada
- Height: 5 ft 10 in (178 cm)
- Weight: 180 lb (82 kg; 12 st 12 lb)
- Position: Left wing
- Shot: Left
- Played for: Winston-Salem Thunderbirds; Albany Choppers; Fredericton Canadiens; Detroit Falcons; Charlotte Checkers; Peterborough Pirates; Daytona Beach Breakers; Nottingham Panthers; Bracknell Bees; Sheffield Steelers; Manchester Storm
- NHL draft: 78th, 1986; Montreal Canadiens
- Playing career: 1990–2005

Brent Bobyck (born April 26, 1968) is a Canadian former professional ice hockey left winger. He was selected 78th overall in the 1986 NHL entry draft by the Montreal Canadiens. Although he never played in the National Hockey League, he has played fourteen professional seasons for various teams in North America and the United Kingdom. He has also played for both the Canadian and the Great Britain national ice hockey teams.

Born in Regina, Saskatchewan, Bobyck currently runs his own power skating school in the Regina area and in the United Kingdom.

== Playing career ==
While playing for the University of North Dakota, with whom he won the NCAA Division 1 championship, Bobyck was selected 78th overall by the Montreal Canadiens in the 1986 NHL entry draft. He played for their American Hockey League (AHL) farm team in 1990–91 as well as playing for the Albany Choppers in the International Hockey League (IHL) and the Winston-Salem Thunderbirds in the East Coast Hockey League (ECHL). The following season, 1991–92, he played for the Detroit Falcons in the Colonial Hockey League. In 1992–93, he signed with the Charlotte Checkers of the ECHL as well as playing for the Canada national men's ice hockey team.

In 1994 Bobyck signed for the Peterborough Pirates in the United Kingdom for whom he played for the next two seasons, finishing the 1995–96 season back in North America with the Daytona Beach Breakers in the Southern Hockey League.

Bobyck returned to the United Kingdom in 1996 to join the Nottingham Panthers for the inaugural season of the Ice Hockey Superleague (ISL). Playing for Nottingham for the next four seasons, he helped them to win the Benson & Hedges Cup in 1996 and 1998. After Nottingham failed to re-sign him for the 2000–01 season, Bobyck joined the Bracknell Bees, also in the ISL, as injury cover. After a few weeks Bobyck moved to the Sheffield Steelers, also as injury cover, before he finished the season with the Manchester Storm.

In 2001–02, Bobyck re-signed for Sheffield and remained with them for four seasons until he retired from ice hockey at the end of the 2004–05 season. During this time he helped Sheffield to win the playoffs in 2001–02, the league championship and the Challenge Cup in 2002–03, and the league championship and the playoffs in the Elite Ice Hockey League's inaugural season, 2003–04.

Having initially announced his retirement at the end of the 2003–04 season he was re-signed by Sheffield for the 2004–05 season after being offered a testimonial season. Having suffered an elbow injury, he only managed a handful of games the following season before he retired from playing in January 2005.

== Honours and awards ==
- Granted a testimonial season by Sheffield Steelers in 2004–05.

== Career statistics ==
			Regular season					Playoffs				
Season	Team	League	GP	G	A	Pts	PIM	GP	G	A	Pts	PIM
1986–87	University of North Dakota	NCAA	46	8	11	19	16					
1987–88	University of North Dakota	NCAA	41	10	20	30	43					
1988–89	University of North Dakota	NCAA	28	11	8	19	16					
1989–90	University of North Dakota	NCAA	44	16	21	37	47					
1990–91	Winston-Salem Thunderbirds	ECHL	18	3	17	20	9	—	—	—	—	—
1990–91	Albany Choppers	IHL	18	0	3	3	10	—	—	—	—	—
1990–91	Fredericton Canadiens	AHL	4	0	0	0	4	—	—	—	—	—
1991–92	Detroit Falcons	CoHL	55	15	39	54	21	6	1	1	2	0
1993–94	Charlotte Checkers	ECHL	44	2	11	13	14	—	—	—	—	—
1994–95	Peterborough Pirates	BHL Prem	25	16	33	49	36					
1995–96	Peterborough Pirates	BHL 1	48	71	69	140						
1995–96	Daytona Beach Breakers	SHL	11	5	9	14	7	4	0	0	0	2
1996–97	Nottingham Panthers	ISL	37	6	4	10	18	8	0	2	2	0
1997–98	Nottingham Panthers	ISL	25	4	13	17	14	6	3	1	4	0
1998–99	Nottingham Panthers	ISL	31	3	9	12	12	8	1	2	3	6
1999–00	Nottingham Panthers	ISL	37	6	23	29	32	3	1	1	2	0
2000–01	Bracknell Bees	ISL	5	1	1	2	2					
2000–01	Sheffield Steelers	ISL	15	0	3	3	10					
2000–01	Manchester Storm	ISL	26	3	4	7	4	6	1	2	3	6
2001–02	Sheffield Steelers	ISL	47	6	14	20	16	8	1	4	5	2
2002–03	Sheffield Steelers	ISL	27	1	6	7	20	17	3	1	4	4
2003–04	Sheffield Steelers	EIHL	53	16	35	51	60	5	2	2	4	0
2004–05	Sheffield Steelers	EIHL	3	0	0	0	2					

== International play ==
Played for Canada in:

- 1989–90 touring team
- 1993–94 touring team

Played for Great Britain in:

- 1999 World Championships Pool A Qualifying Tournament

=== International statistics ===
Year	Team	Comp	GP	G	A	Pts	PIM
1989–90	Canada	Int'l	3	0	0	0	0
1993–94	Canada	Int'l	6	2	1	3	2
1999	Great Britain	WCQ	3	0	0	0	0
