= 1987 WCHA men's ice hockey tournament =

1987 WCHA Men's ice hockey tournament
- Dates: February 27-March 14, 1987
- Teams: 8
- Finals site: Winter Sports Center; Grand Forks, North Dakota
- Champions: North Dakota (5th title)
- Winning coach: John Gasparini (3rd title)
- WCHA Men's Ice Hockey Tournaments

The 1987 WCHA Men's Ice Hockey Tournament was the 28th conference playoff in league history and 35th season where a WCHA champion was crowned. The tournament was played between February 27 and March 14, 1987. First round and semifinal games were played at home team campus sites while the championship match was held, for the final time, at the Winter Sports Center in Grand Forks, North Dakota. By winning the tournament, North Dakota was awarded the Broadmoor Trophy and received the WCHA's automatic bid to the 1987 NCAA Division I Men's Ice Hockey Tournament.

== Format ==
All member teams were eligible for the tournament and were seeded No. 1 through No. 8 according to their final conference standing, with a tiebreaker system used to seed teams with an identical number of points accumulated. The top four seeded teams each earned home ice and hosted one of the lower seeded teams. As a result of their being the regular season champion, North Dakota's home venue, Winter Sports Center, served as the site for the Championship game regardless of which teams qualified for the penultimate match. Each series were two-game matchups with the team that scored the most goals advancing to the succeeding round. The teams that advanced to the semifinal were re-seeded No. 1 through No. 4 according to the final regular season conference standings, with the top remaining seed matched against lowest remaining seed in one semifinal game while the two other semifinalists meeting with the winners advancing to the championship round. The Tournament Champion received an automatic bid to the 1987 NCAA Division I Men's Ice Hockey Tournament.

=== Conference standings ===
Note: GP = Games played; W = Wins; L = Losses; T = Ties; PTS = Points; GF = Goals For; GA = Goals Against

1986–87 Western Collegiate Hockey Association standings
	Conference							Overall					
	GP	W	L	T	PTS	GF	GA	GP	W	L	T	GF	GA
North Dakota†*	35	29	6	0	58	200	94	48	40	8	0	264	129
Minnesota	35	25	9	1	51	176	123	49	34	14	1	248	165
Denver	35	16	16	3	35	150	149	40	19	18	3	182	172
Wisconsin	35	17	17	1	35	127	134	42	23	18	1	160	155
Northern Michigan	35	16	18	1	33	131	144	40	18	21	1	151	164
Colorado College	35	12	22	1	25	143	151	42	17	24	1	171	176
Michigan Tech	35	11	23	1	23	118	182	40	11	28	1	130	218
Minnesota-Duluth	35	11	23	1	23	114	163	39	11	27	1	121	184
Championship: North Dakota † indicates conference regular season champion * indicates conference tournament champion

== Bracket ==
Teams are reseeded after the first round

First Round; February 27-March 1
1	North Dakota	5	8	13
8	Minnesota-Duluth	3	1	4
2	Minnesota	9	8	17
7	Michigan Tech	4	5	9
3	Denver	2	2	4
6	Colorado College	4	3	7
4	Wisconsin	4	6	10
5	Northern Michigan	2	2	4

Semifinals; March 6–7
1	North Dakota	6	1	7
6	Colorado College	2	2	4
2	Minnesota	1	8	9
4	Wisconsin	2	4	6

Championship; March 13–14
1	North Dakota	5	5	10
2	Minnesota	3	3	6

Note: * denotes overtime period(s)

=== First round ===
==== (1) North Dakota vs. (8) Minnesota-Duluth ====
February 28	North Dakota	5 – 3	Minnesota-Duluth	Winter Sports Center

March 1	North Dakota	8 – 1	Minnesota-Duluth	Winter Sports Center

North Dakota won series 13–4

==== (2) Minnesota vs. (7) Michigan Tech ====
February 28	Minnesota	9 – 4	Michigan Tech	Mariucci Arena

March 1	Minnesota	8 – 5	Michigan Tech	Mariucci Arena

Minnesota won series 17–9

==== (3) Denver vs. (6) Colorado College ====
February 27	Denver	2 – 4	Colorado College	DU Arena

February 28	Denver	2 – 3	Colorado College	DU Arena

Colorado College won series 7–4

==== (4) Wisconsin vs. (5) Northern Michigan ====
February 28	Wisconsin	4 – 2	Northern Michigan	Dane County Coliseum

March 1	Wisconsin	6 – 2	Northern Michigan	Dane County Coliseum

Wisconsin won series 10–4

=== Semifinals ===
==== (1) North Dakota vs. (6) Colorado College ====
March 6	North Dakota	6 – 2	Colorado College	Winter Sports Center

March 7	North Dakota	1 – 2	Colorado College	Winter Sports Center

North Dakota won series 7–4

==== (2) Minnesota vs. (4) Wisconsin ====
March 6	Minnesota	1 – 2	Wisconsin	Mariucci Arena

March 7	Minnesota	8 – 4	Wisconsin	Mariucci Arena

Minnesota won series 9–6

=== Championship ===
==== (1) North Dakota vs. (2) Minnesota ====
March 13	North Dakota	5 – 3	Minnesota	Winter Sports Center

March 14	North Dakota	5 – 3	Minnesota	Winter Sports Center

North Dakota won series 10–6

== Tournament awards ==
None

== See also ==
- Western Collegiate Hockey Association men's champions
