= 1986–87 NCAA Division I men's ice hockey season =

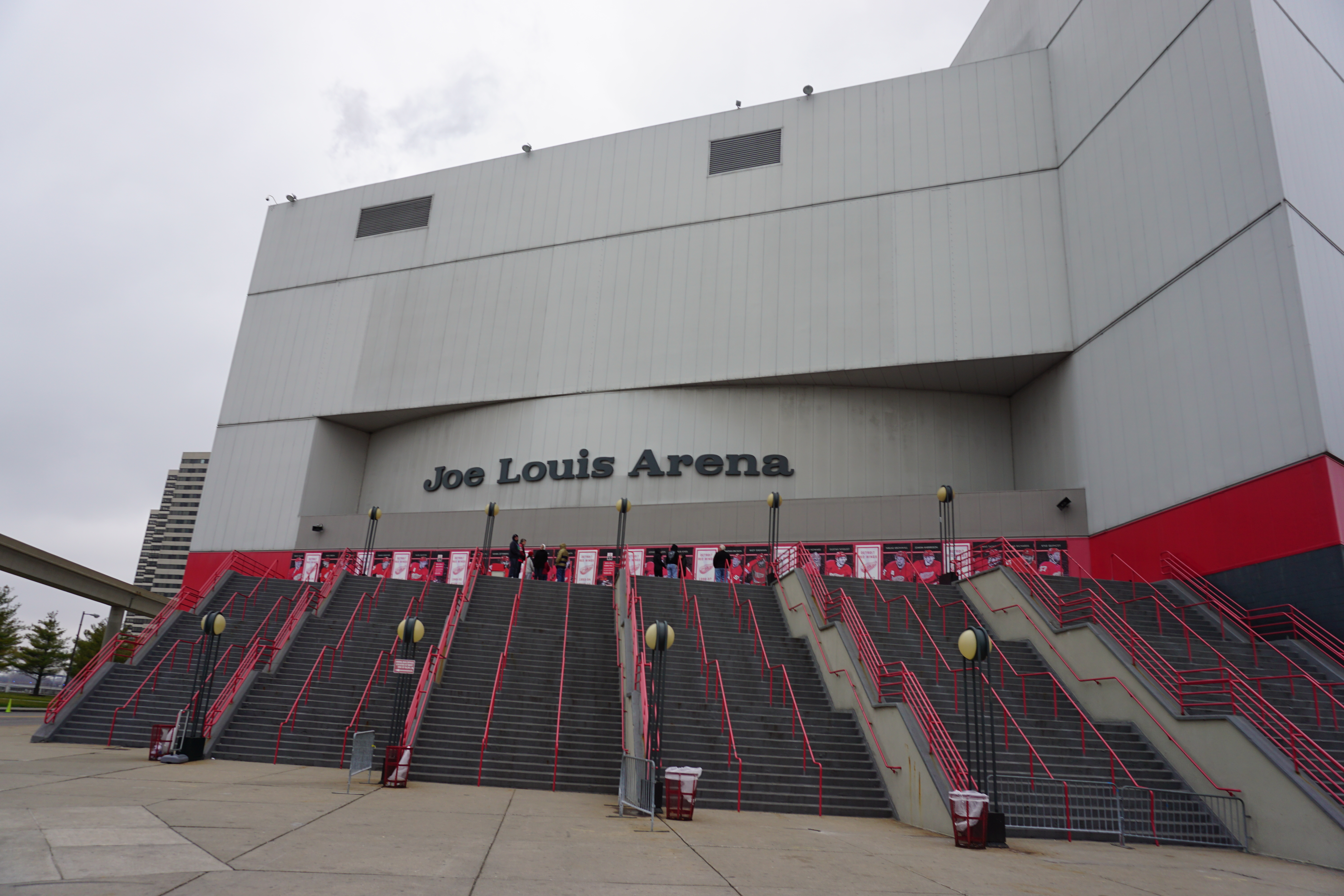
- The Joe Louis Arena served as the host for the 1987 Frozen Four
- Duration: October 1986– March 28, 1987
- NCAA tournament: 1987
- National championship: Joe Louis Arena; Detroit, Michigan
- NCAA champion: North Dakota
- Hobey Baker Award: Tony Hrkac (North Dakota)

The 1986–87 NCAA Division I men's ice hockey season began in October 1986 and concluded with the 1987 NCAA Division I Men's Ice Hockey Tournament's championship game on March 28, 1987 at the Joe Louis Arena in Detroit, Michigan. This was the 40th season in which an NCAA ice hockey championship was held and is the 93rd year overall where an NCAA school fielded a team.

Notre Dame and Kent State formed the ACHA with two other schools, however, the two other universities didn't play at the Division I level and its standings are not official.

== Season Outlook ==
=== Pre-season polls ===
The top teams in the nation.

The WMPL poll was voted on by coaches before the start of the season. The College Hockey Statistics Bureau (CHSB) / WMEB poll was voted on by media after the season started.

WMPL Poll
Rank	Team
1	Minnesota (5)
2	Michigan State (4)
3	North Dakota (1)
4	Boston University
5	Denver
6	Harvard
7	Bowling Green
8	Boston College
9	Wisconsin
10	Northern Michigan

CHSB / WMEB Poll
Rank	Team
1	Boston University (6)
2	Minnesota (2)
3	Michigan State (1)
4	Bowling Green (1)
5	Harvard
6 (tie)	Denver (1)
6 (tie)	Cornell
8	North Dakota
9	Northern Michigan
10	Wisconsin

== Regular season ==
=== Season tournaments ===
Tournament	Dates	Teams	Champion
Rensselaer Holiday Tournament	November 28–29	4	Ferris State
Jeep/Nissan Classic	December 20–21	4	Minnesota
Syracuse Invitational	December 26–27	4	Bowling Green
Great Lakes Invitational	December 27–28	4	Western Michigan
Schweppes Invitational	December 27–28	4	Ohio State
Auld Lang Syne Classic	December 30–31	4	New Hampshire
Phoenix Mutual Classic	January 2–3	4	Cornell
Beanpot	February 2, 9	4	Boston University

=== Standings ===
1986–87 American Collegiate Hockey Association standings
	Conference							Overall					
	GP	W	L	T	PTS	GF	GA	GP	W	L	T	GF	GA
Lake Forest †	12	8	3	1	17	49	44	26	15	10	1	123	86
Kent State	12	7	5	0	14	-	-	32	19	13	0	-	-
Notre Dame	12	4	7	1	9	40	47	30	10	19	1	103	122
Michigan–Dearborn *	12	3	7	2	8	-	-	41	21	18	2	-	-
Championship: March 7, 1987 † indicates division regular season champion * indicates conference tournament champion

1986–87 Central Collegiate Hockey Association standings
	Conference							Overall					
	GP	W	L	T	PTS	GF	GA	GP	W	L	T	GF	GA
Bowling Green†	32	24	6	2	50	181	121	45	33	10	2	238	160
Michigan State*	32	23	8	1	47	163	117	45	33	10	2	231	156
Lake Superior State	32	19	11	2	40	143	130	40	22	16	2	181	168
Illinois-Chicago	32	18	13	1	37	148	118	39	21	17	1	176	154
Western Michigan	32	16	16	0	32	155	144	43	23	20	0	219	187
Ohio State	32	12	19	1	25	132	168	43	19	23	1	188	211
Michigan	32	11	20	1	23	153	174	40	14	25	1	188	220
Ferris State	32	9	23	0	18	114	152	43	16	27	0	157	197
Miami	32	8	24	0	16	127	192	39	8	31	0	151	232
Championship: Michigan State † indicates conference regular season champion * indicates conference tournament champion

1986–87 ECAC Hockey standings
	Conference							Overall					
	GP	W	L	T	PTS	GF	GA	GP	W	L	T	GF	GA
Harvard†*	22	20	2	0	40	106	43	34	28	6	0	160	77
Colgate	22	15	6	1	31	111	85	33	23	9	1	170	116
St. Lawrence	22	14	7	1	30	109	73	35	24	11	0	180	114
Yale	22	13	9	0	29	77	71	30	15	12	3	101	113
Clarkson	22	12	10	0	26	84	66	31	17	13	1	117	101
Vermont	22	9	13	0	24	75	82	32	18	14	0	125	120
Rensselaer	22	9	13	0	18	81	75	33	13	18	2	123	98
Brown	22	9	13	0	18	83	102	27	11	16	0	103	128
Cornell	22	8	14	0	16	84	94	27	11	16	0	106	114
Princeton	22	7	14	1	15	67	87	26	8	17	1	81	107
Army	22	6	16	0	12	64	109	29	9	19	1	89	130
Dartmouth	22	2	19	1	5	57	109	25	2	22	1	63	127
Championship: Harvard † indicates conference regular season champion * indicates conference tournament champion

1986–87 Great West Hockey Conference standings
	Conference							Overall					
	GP	W	L	T	PTS	GF	GA	GP	W	L	T	GF	GA
Alaska–Anchorage†	16	9	6	1	19	75	66	30	19	9	2	152	114
US International	16	7	8	1	15	-	-	35	17	17	1	-	-
Alaska–Fairbanks	16	7	9	0	14	-	-	27	17	10	0	172	173
† indicates conference regular season champion

1986–87 Hockey East standings
	Conference							Overall					
	GP	W	L	T	PTS	GF	GA	GP	W	L	T	GF	GA
Boston College†*	32	26	6	0	52	203	121	39	31	8	0	233	145
Lowell	32	20	10	2	42	146	136	36	22	12	2	166	163
Maine	32	19	12	1	39	159	117	42	24	16	2	196	151
Boston University	32	15	14	3	33	134	132	37	19	15	3	158	146
Northeastern	32	11	18	3	25	110	139	37	13	21	3	126	167
Providence	32	7	22	3	17	104	156	33	7	23	3	106	161
New Hampshire	32	5	24	3	13	105	179	38	8	27	3	124	204
Championship: Boston College † indicates conference regular season champion * indicates conference tournament champion

1986–87 NCAA Division I Independent ice hockey standings
	Conference							Overall					
	GP	W	L	T	PTS	GF	GA	GP	W	L	T	GF	GA
Air Force	0	0	0	0	-	-	-	29	19	10	0	152	110

1986–87 Western Collegiate Hockey Association standings
	Conference							Overall					
	GP	W	L	T	PTS	GF	GA	GP	W	L	T	GF	GA
North Dakota†*	35	29	6	0	58	200	94	48	40	8	0	264	129
Minnesota	35	25	9	1	51	176	123	49	34	14	1	248	165
Denver	35	16	16	3	35	150	149	40	19	18	3	182	172
Wisconsin	35	17	17	1	35	127	134	42	23	18	1	160	155
Northern Michigan	35	16	18	1	33	131	144	40	18	21	1	151	164
Colorado College	35	12	22	1	25	143	151	42	17	24	1	171	176
Michigan Tech	35	11	23	1	23	118	182	40	11	28	1	130	218
Minnesota-Duluth	35	11	23	1	23	114	163	39	11	27	1	121	184
Championship: North Dakota † indicates conference regular season champion * indicates conference tournament champion

=== Final regular season polls ===
The final top 10 teams as ranked by coaches (WMPL) before the conference tournament finals.

The final media poll (CHSB/WDOM) was released after the conference tournament finals.

WMPL Coaches Poll
Ranking	Team
1	North Dakota (8)
2	Boston College
3	Bowling Green (2)
4	Harvard
5	Minnesota
6	Michigan State
7	Lowell
8	St. Lawrence
9	Lake Superior State
10	Yale

CHSB / WMEB Media Poll
Ranking	Team
1	North Dakota (10)
2	Boston College
3	Minnesota
4	Michigan State
	Harvard
6	Bowling Green
	Lowell
8	Maine
9	St. Lawrence
10	Lake Superior State

== 1987 NCAA Tournament ==
Quarterfinals; March 20–21
E1	Boston College	1	3	4
W4	Minnesota	4	2	6
W2	Michigan State	6	5	11
E3	Maine	2	3	5
W1	North Dakota	3	6	9
E4	St. Lawrence	1	3	4
E2	Harvard	7	3	10
W3	Bowling Green	1	0	1

Semifinals; March 26–27
W4	Minnesota	3
W2	Michigan State	5
W1	North Dakota	5
E2	Harvard	2

National Championship; March 28
W2	Michigan State	3
W1	North Dakota	5
Third-place game
W4	Minnesota	6
E2	Harvard	3

Note: * denotes overtime period(s)

== Player stats ==
=== Scoring leaders ===
The following players led the league in points at the conclusion of the season.

GP = Games played; G = Goals; A = Assists; Pts = Points; PIM = Penalty minutes

Player	Class	Team	GP	G	A	Pts	PIM
Tony Hrkac	Sophomore	North Dakota	48	46	70	116	48
Mitch Messier	Senior	Michigan State	45	44	48	92	89
Bob Joyce	Junior	North Dakota	48	52	37	89	42
Wayne Gagné	Senior	Western Michigan	43	13	76	89	38
Rick Brebant	Junior	Ohio State	42	35	51	86	50
Paul Ysebaert	Junior	Bowling Green	45	27	58	85	44
Craig Janney	Sophomore	Boston College	37	28	55	83	6
Kevin Miller	Junior	Michigan State	45	25	56	81	63
Bill Shibicky	Senior	Michigan State	42	43	36	79	100
Rob Bryden	Senior	Western Michigan	43	46	32	78	82
Brad Jones	Senior	Michigan	40	32	46	78	64

=== Leading goaltenders ===
The following goaltenders led the league in goals against average at the end of the regular season while playing at least 33% of their team's total minutes.

GP = Games played; Min = Minutes played; W = Wins; L = Losses; OT = Overtime/shootout losses; GA = Goals against; SO = Shutouts; SV% = Save percentage; GAA = Goals against average

Player	Class	Team	GP	Min	W	L	OT	GA	SO	SV%	GAA
Richard McEvoy	Senior	Harvard	24	1460	19	5	0	54	4	.915	2.22
Ed Belfour	Freshman	North Dakota	33	2049	29	4	0	81	3	.915	2.43
Bob Essensa	Senior	Michigan State	25	1381	19	3	1	64	0	.884	2.78
Scott Yearwood	Junior	St. Lawrence	28	1456	-	-	-	72	1	.905	2.94
John Fletcher	Freshman	Clarkson	23	1240	11	8	-	62	4	.907	3.00
Scott King	Freshman	Maine	21	1111	11	6	1	58	0	.894	3.13
John Blue	Junior	Minnesota	33	1889	21	9	1	99	3	.889	3.14
Brad Ryan	Junior	Illinois-Chicago	16	925	9	4	1	49	0	.889	3.18
Gary Kruzich	Senior	Bowling Green	38	1564	28	7	2	123	0	.883	3.31
Gavin Armstrong	Freshman	Rensselaer	26	1387	11	13	1	79	1	.889	3.42

== Awards ==
=== NCAA ===
Award		Recipient
Hobey Baker Memorial Award		Tony Hrkac, North Dakota
Spencer Penrose Award		Gino Gasparini, North Dakota
Most Outstanding Player in NCAA Tournament		Tony Hrkac, North Dakota
AHCA All-American Teams
East First Team	Position	West First Team
Bruce Racine, Northeastern	G	Gary Kruzich, Bowling Green
Mark Benning, Harvard	D	Wayne Gagné, Western Michigan
Brian Leetch, Boston College	D	Ian Kidd, North Dakota
Craig Janney, Boston College	F	Tony Hrkac, North Dakota
Lane MacDonald, Harvard	F	Bob Joyce, North Dakota
Joe Nieuwendyk, Cornell	F	Mitch Messier, Michigan State
East Second Team	Position	West Second Team
Scott Yearwood, St. Lawrence	G	Ed Belfour, North Dakota
Hank Lammens, Harvard	D	Rob Doyle, Colorado College
Eric Weinrich, Maine	D	Don McSween, Michigan State
Pete Lappin, St. Lawrence	F	Gary Emmons, Northern Michigan
Jon Morris, Lowell	F	Tony Granato, Wisconsin
Kevin Stevens, Boston College	F	Brad Jones, Michigan

=== CCHA ===
Awards		Recipient
Player of the Year		Wayne Gagné, Western Michigan
Rookie of the Year		Nelson Emerson, Bowling Green
Coach of the Year		Val Belmonte, Illinois-Chicago
Most Valuable Player in Tournament		Bobby Reynolds, Michigan State
All-CCHA Teams
First Team	Position	Second Team
Gary Kruzich, Bowling Green	G	Bill Horn, Western Michigan
Wayne Gagné, Western Michigan	D	Brian McKee, Bowling Green
Don McSween, Michigan State	D	Jeff Norton, Michigan
Mitch Messier, Michigan State	F	Paul Ysebaert, Bowling Green
Brad Jones, Michigan	F	Bill Shibicky, Michigan State
Iain Duncan, Bowling Green	F	Rob Bryden, Western Michigan

=== ECAC ===
Award		Recipient
Player of the Year		Joe Nieuwendyk, Cornell
Rookie of the Year		John Fletcher, Clarkson
Coach of the Year		Tim Taylor, Yale
Most Outstanding Player in Tournament		Lane MacDonald, Harvard
All-ECAC Hockey Teams
First Team	Position	Second Team
Mike O'Neill, Yale	G	Scott Yearwood, St. Lawrence
	G	Wayne Crowley, Colgate
Randy Taylor, Harvard	D	Hank Lammens, St. Lawrence
Mark Benning, Harvard	D	Dave Baseggio, Yale
Joe Nieuwendyk, Cornell	F	Tim Barakett, Harvard
Lane MacDonald, Harvard	F	Pete Lappin, St. Lawrence
Bob Kudelski, Yale	F	John Messuri, Princeton

=== Hockey East ===
Award		Recipient
Player of the Year		Brian Leetch, Boston College
Rookie of the Year		Brian Leetch, Boston College
Coach of the Year Award		Bill Riley Jr., Lowell
William Flynn Tournament Most Valuable Player		Brian Leetch, Boston College
All-Hockey East Teams
First Team	Position	Second Team
Bruce Racine, Northeastern	G	Dave Delfino, Lowell
Brian Leetch, Boston College	D	Jack Capuano, Maine
Eric Weinrich, Maine	D	Paul Ames, Lowell
Craig Janney, Boston College	F	Dan Shea, Boston College
Jon Morris, Lowell	F	Gord Cruickshank, Providence
Kevin Stevens, Boston College	F	John Cullen, Boston University
Rookie Team	Position	
Matt Merten, Providence	G	
Brian Leetch, Boston College	D	
Greg Brown, Boston College	D	
Dave Capuano, Maine	F	
Randy LeBrasseur, Lowell	F	
Rick Bennett, Providence	F	

=== WCHA ===
Award		Recipient
Most Valuable Player		Tony Hrkac, North Dakota
Freshman of the Year		Dave Shields, Denver
Student-Athlete of the Year		Tony Granato, Wisconsin
Coach of the Year		Gino Gasparini, North Dakota
All-WCHA Teams
First Team	Position	Second Team
Ed Belfour, North Dakota	G	Mike Richter, Wisconsin
Rob Doyle, Colorado College	D	Todd Richards, Minnesota
Ian Kidd, North Dakota	D	Guy Gosselin, Minnesota-Duluth
Tony Hrkac, North Dakota	F	Rick Boh, Colorado College
Bob Joyce, North Dakota	F	Paul Ranheim, Wisconsin
Gary Emmons, Northern Michigan	F	Corey Millen, Minnesota
	F	Tony Granato, Wisconsin

== 1987 NHL entry draft ==
Round	Pick	Player	College	Conference	NHL team
1	19	Bryan Deasley	Michigan	CCHA	Calgary Flames
2	30	Jeff Harding ^{†}	Michigan State	CCHA	Philadelphia Flyers
2	33	John LeClair ^{†}	Vermont	ECAC Hockey	Montreal Canadiens
2	42	Brad Werenka	Northern Michigan	WCHA	Edmonton Oilers
3	63	Geoff Smith ^{†}	North Dakota	WCHA	Edmonton Oilers
4	65	Brian Sullivan ^{†}	Northeastern	Hockey East	New Jersey Devils
4	66	Doug Torrel ^{†}	Minnesota–Duluth	WCHA	Vancouver Canucks
4	69	Mike Sullivan	Boston University	Hockey East	New York Rangers
4	70	Tim Harris ^{†}	Lake Superior State	CCHA	Calgary Flames
4	71	Joe Sacco ^{†}	Boston University	Hockey East	Toronto Maple Leafs
4	72	Kip Miller	Michigan State	CCHA	Quebec Nordiques
4	73	John Weisbrod ^{†}	Harvard	ECAC Hockey	Minnesota North Stars
4	79	Don McLennan	Denver	WCHA	Winnipeg Jets
4	80	Kris Miller ^{†}	Minnesota–Duluth	WCHA	Montreal Canadiens
4	82	Andy Rymsha	Western Michigan	CCHA	St. Louis Blues
4	84	John Bradley ^{†}	Boston University	Hockey East	Buffalo Sabres
5	85	Dave Pergola ^{†}	Boston College	Hockey East	Buffalo Sabres
5	86	Kevin Dean ^{†}	New Hampshire	Hockey East	New Jersey Devils
5	87	Sean Fabian ^{†}	Minnesota	WCHA	Vancouver Canucks
5	90	Mike Vukonich ^{†}	Harvard	ECAC Hockey	Los Angeles Kings
5	91	Mike Eastwood ^{†}	Western Michigan	CCHA	Toronto Maple Leafs
5	93	Rob Mendel	Wisconsin	WCHA	Quebec Nordiques
5	94	Erik O'Borsky	Yale	ECAC Hockey	New York Rangers
5	96	Ken Gernander ^{†}	Minnesota	WCHA	Winnipeg Jets
5	98	Ted Donato ^{†}	Harvard	ECAC Hockey	Boston Bruins
5	100	Darrin Amundson ^{†}	Minnesota–Duluth	WCHA	Winnipeg Jets
5	101	Steve McCool ^{†}	Boston College	Hockey East	Montreal Canadiens
5	102	Marc Rosseau	Denver	WCHA	Hartford Whalers
5	103	Tim Corkery	Ferris State	CCHA	Calgary Flames
6	106	Chris Marshall ^{†}	Michigan State	CCHA	Buffalo Sabres
6	107	Ben Hankinson ^{†}	Minnesota	WCHA	New Jersey Devils
6	108	Garry Valk ^{†}	North Dakota	WCHA	Vancouver Canucks
6	110	Shawn McEachern ^{†}	Boston University	Hockey East	Pittsburgh Penguins
6	112	Damian Rhodes ^{†}	Michigan Tech	WCHA	Toronto Maple Leafs
6	113	Mike McCormick ^{†}	North Dakota	WCHA	Chicago Blackhawks
6	114	Garth Snow ^{†}	Maine	Hockey East	Quebec Nordiques
6	116	Sean Clifford	Ohio State	CCHA	Detroit Red Wings
6	117	Rob Robinson	Miami	CCHA	St. Louis Blues
6	119	Matt Glennon ^{†}	Boston College	Hockey East	Boston Bruins
6	120	Rich DeFreitas ^{†}	Harvard	ECAC Hockey	Washington Capitals
6	121	Joe Harwell ^{†}	Wisconsin	WCHA	Winnipeg Jets
6	122	Les Kuntar ^{†}	St. Lawrence	ECAC Hockey	Montreal Canadiens
6	123	Jeff St. Cyr	Michigan Tech	WCHA	Hartford Whalers
6	125	Tony Link ^{†}	Maine	Hockey East	Philadelphia Flyers
7	127	Paul Flanagan ^{†}	Northeastern	Hockey East	Buffalo Sabres
7	128	Tom Neziol	Miami	CCHA	New Jersey Devils
7	129	Todd Fanning	Ohio State	CCHA	Vancouver Canucks
7	131	Jim Bodden ^{†}	Miami	CCHA	Pittsburgh Penguins
7	134	Stephen Tepper ^{†}	Maine	Hockey East	Chicago Blackhawks
7	136	Clint Thomas ^{†}	Rensselaer	ECAC Hockey	New York Rangers
7	140	Rob Cheevers	Boston College	Hockey East	Boston Bruins
7	142	Tod Hartje	Harvard	ECAC Hockey	Winnipeg Jets
7	144	Gregg Wolf ^{†}	Colgate	ECAC Hockey	Hartford Whalers
7	145	Peter Ciavaglia ^{†}	Harvard	ECAC Hockey	Calgary Flames
8	149	Jim Dowd ^{†}	Lake Superior State	CCHA	New Jersey Devils
8	153	Tim Roberts ^{†}	Rensselaer	ECAC Hockey	Buffalo Sabres
8	154	Chris Jensen ^{†}	Wisconsin	WCHA	Toronto Maple Leafs
8	155	John Reilly ^{†}	Boston College	Hockey East	Chicago Blackhawks
8	156	Jake Enebak ^{†}	Minnesota	WCHA	Quebec Nordiques
8	157	Chuck Wiegand ^{†}	Ferris State	CCHA	New York Rangers
8	158	Kevin Scott ^{†}	Northern Michigan	WCHA	Detroit Red Wings
8	161	Chris Winnes ^{†}	New Hampshire	Hockey East	Boston Bruins
8	164	Will Geist ^{†}	Dartmouth	ECAC Hockey	Montreal Canadiens
8	165	John Moore	Yale	ECAC Hockey	Hartford Whalers
9	171	Craig Daly ^{†}	Lowell	Hockey East	Vancouver Canucks
9	173	John MacDougall ^{†}	Michigan–Dearborn	ACHA	Pittsburgh Penguins
9	174	Jeff Gawlicki	Northern Michigan	WCHA	Los Angeles Kings
9	176	Lance Werness ^{†}	Minnesota	WCHA	Chicago Blackhawks
9	181	Shawn Howard ^{†}	Minnesota–Duluth	WCHA	New York Islanders
9	182	Paul Ohman ^{†}	Brown	ECAC Hockey	Boston Bruins
9	184	Jim Fernholz ^{†}	Vermont	ECAC Hockey	Winnipeg Jets
9	186	Joe Day	St. Lawrence	ECAC Hockey	Hartford Whalers
9	187	Mark Osiecki ^{†}	Wisconsin	WCHA	Calgary Flames
9	188	Bruce MacDonald ^{†}	New Hampshire	Hockey East	Philadelphia Flyers
9	189	Gavin Armstrong	Rensselaer	ECAC Hockey	Edmonton Oilers
10	192	John Fletcher	Clarkson	ECAC Hockey	Vancouver Canucks
10	193	Larry Olimb ^{†}	Minnesota	WCHA	Minnesota North Stars
10	194	Daryn McBride	Denver	WCHA	Pittsburgh Penguins
10	195	John Preston ^{†}	Boston University	Hockey East	Los Angeles Kings
10	198	Darren Nauss ^{†}	Minnesota–Duluth	WCHA	Quebec Nordiques
10	199	Dave Porter	Northern Michigan	WCHA	New York Rangers
10	201	David Marvin ^{†}	North Dakota	WCHA	St. Louis Blues
10	203	Casey Jones	Cornell	ECAC Hockey	Boston Bruins
10	204	Chris Clarke ^{†}	Western Michigan	CCHA	Washington Capitals
10	205	Brett Barnett ^{†}	Lake Superior State	CCHA	New York Rangers
10	207	Andy Cesarski ^{†}	Princeton	ECAC Hockey	St. Louis Blues
10	209	Steve Morrow ^{†}	New Hampshire	Hockey East	Philadelphia Flyers
10	210	Mike Tinkham ^{†}	Lowell	Hockey East	Edmonton Oilers
11	211	David Littman	Boston College	Hockey East	Buffalo Sabres
11	215	Mark Carlson ^{†}	Lowell	Hockey East	Pittsburgh Penguins
11	218	Bill LaCouture ^{†}	New Hampshire	Hockey East	Chicago Blackhawks
11	219	Mike Williams ^{†}	Ferris State	CCHA	Quebec Nordiques
11	220	Lance Marciano ^{†}	Yale	ECAC Hockey	New York Rangers
11	222	Daniel Rolfe ^{†}	Ferris State	CCHA	St. Louis Blues
11	223	Mike Erickson ^{†}	Lowell	Hockey East	New York Islanders
11	224	Eric LeMarque	Northern Michigan	WCHA	Boston Bruins
11	227	Ed Ronan ^{†}	Boston University	Hockey East	Montreal Canadiens
11	228	Kevin Sullivan	Princeton	ECAC Hockey	Hartford Whalers
11	231	Jeff Pauletti	Minnesota	WCHA	Edmonton Oilers
12	233	Neil Eisenhut ^{†}	North Dakota	WCHA	Vancouver Canucks
12	239	Mike Lappin ^{†}	Boston University	Hockey East	Chicago Blackhawks
12	244	Will Averill	Northeastern	Hockey East	New York Islanders
12	245	Sean Gorman ^{†}	Princeton	ECAC Hockey	Boston Bruins
12	246	Ryan Kummu	Rensselaer	ECAC Hockey	Washington Capitals
12	249	Steve Laurin	Dartmouth	ECAC Hockey	Hartford Whalers

† incoming freshman

== See also ==
- 1986–87 NCAA Division III men's ice hockey season
