= Mitch Messier =

Canadian ice hockey player

- Born: August 21, 1965 (age 59); Regina, Saskatchewan, Canada
- Height: 6 ft 2 in (188 cm)
- Weight: 210 lb (95 kg; 15 st 0 lb)
- Position: Right wing
- Shot: Right
- Played for: Minnesota North Stars; Klagenfurter AC
- NHL draft: 56th overall, 1983; Minnesota North Stars
- Playing career: 1987–1996

Mitch Ronald Messier (born August 21, 1965) is a Canadian former professional ice hockey player who played 20 games in the National Hockey League. He played with the Minnesota North Stars between 1987 and 1991. He played at Michigan State University from 1983-1987.

Mitch is the brother of Joby Messier and a cousin of Hockey Hall of Fame member Mark Messier.

== Career statistics ==
=== Regular season and playoffs ===
			Regular season					Playoffs
Season	Team	League	GP	G	A	Pts	PIM	GP	G	A	Pts	PIM
1980–81	Notre Dame Hounds	SK-U15	71	118	145	263	—	—	—	—	—	—
1981–82	Notre Dame Hounds	SK-U18	26	8	20	28	—	—	—	—	—	—
1982–83	Notre Dame Hounds	SK-U18	60	108	73	181	160	—	—	—	—	—
1983–84	Michigan State University	CCHA	37	6	15	21	22	—	—	—	—	—
1984–85	Michigan State University	CCHA	42	12	21	33	47	—	—	—	—	—
1985–86	Michigan State University	CCHA	38	24	40	64	36	—	—	—	—	—
1986–87	Michigan State University	CCHA	45	44	48	92	89	—	—	—	—	—
1987–88	Kalamazoo Wings	IHL	69	29	37	66	42	4	2	1	3	0
1987–88	Minnesota North Stars	NHL	13	0	1	1	11	—	—	—	—	—
1988–89	Kalamazoo Wings	IHL	67	34	46	80	71	6	4	3	7	0
1988–89	Minnesota North Stars	NHL	3	0	1	1	0	—	—	—	—	—
1989–90	Kalamazoo Wings	IHL	65	26	58	84	56	8	4	3	7	25
1989–90	Minnesota North Stars	NHL	2	0	0	0	0	—	—	—	—	—
1990–91	Kalamazoo Wings	IHL	73	30	46	76	34	11	4	8	12	2
1990–91	Minnesota North Stars	NHL	2	0	0	0	0	—	—	—	—	—
1991–92	Kalamazoo Wings	IHL	77	43	33	76	42	12	3	3	6	25
1992–93	Milwaukee Admirals	IHL	62	18	23	41	84	6	0	1	1	0
1993–94	Fort Wayne Komets	IHL	69	33	27	60	77	14	8	6	14	14
1994–95	Klagenfurter AC	AUT	35	21	23	44	—	—	—	—	—	—
1995–96	Fort Wayne Komets	IHL	59	15	21	36	55	3	0	1	1	4
IHL totals			541	228	291	519	461	64	25	26	51	70
NHL totals			20	0	2	2	11	—	—	—	—	—

== Awards and honours ==
Award	Year
All-CCHA First Team	1986–87
AHCA West First-Team All-American	1986–87
