= 1987 ECAC Hockey men's ice hockey tournament =

1987 ECAC Men's ice hockey tournament
- Dates: March 6–14, 1987
- Teams: 8
- Finals site: Boston Garden; Boston, Massachusetts
- Champions: Harvard (3rd title)
- Winning coach: Bill Cleary (2nd title)
- MVP: Lane MacDonald (Harvard)
- ECAC Men's Ice Hockey Tournaments

The 1987 ECAC Hockey Men's Ice Hockey Tournament was the 26th tournament in league history. It was played between March 6 and March 14, 1987. Quarterfinal games were played at home team campus sites, while the 'final four' games were played at the Boston Garden in Boston, Massachusetts. By winning the tournament, Harvard received the ECAC's automatic bid to the 1987 NCAA Division I Men's Ice Hockey Tournament.

== Format ==
The tournament featured three rounds of play. The four teams that finish below eighth place in the standings are not eligible for tournament play. In the quarterfinals the first seed and eighth seed, the second seed and seventh seed, the third seed and sixth seed and the fourth seed and fifth seed played a two-game series to determine the winner. In the two games no overtime was permitted and if the two teams remained tied after the two games then a 10-minute mini-game would be played where a sudden-death overtime was allowed if the scheduled time did not produce a victor. After the opening round every series becomes a single-elimination game. In the semifinals, the highest seed plays the lowest remaining seed while the two remaining teams play with the winners advancing to the championship game and the losers advancing to the third place game. The tournament champion receives an automatic bid to the 1987 NCAA Division I Men's Ice Hockey Tournament.

== Conference standings ==
Note: GP = Games played; W = Wins; L = Losses; T = Ties; PTS = Points; GF = Goals For; GA = Goals Against

1986–87 ECAC Hockey standings
	Conference							Overall					
	GP	W	L	T	PTS	GF	GA	GP	W	L	T	GF	GA
Harvard†*	22	20	2	0	40	106	43	34	28	6	0	160	77
Colgate	22	15	6	1	31	111	85	33	23	9	1	170	116
St. Lawrence	22	14	7	1	30	109	73	35	24	11	0	180	114
Yale	22	13	9	0	29	77	71	30	15	12	3	101	113
Clarkson	22	12	10	0	26	84	66	31	17	13	1	117	101
Vermont	22	9	13	0	24	75	82	32	18	14	0	125	120
Rensselaer	22	9	13	0	18	81	75	33	13	18	2	123	98
Brown	22	9	13	0	18	83	102	27	11	16	0	103	128
Cornell	22	8	14	0	16	84	94	27	11	16	0	106	114
Princeton	22	7	14	1	15	67	87	26	8	17	1	81	107
Army	22	6	16	0	12	64	109	29	9	19	1	89	130
Dartmouth	22	2	19	1	5	57	109	25	2	22	1	63	127
Championship: Harvard † indicates conference regular season champion * indicates conference tournament champion

== Bracket ==
Teams are reseeded after the first round

Quarterfinals; March 6–7
1	Harvard	6	5	—
8	Brown	2	2	—
2	Colgate	1	7	0
7	Rensselaer	9	2	2
(Pairings are reseeded after the first round)
3	St. Lawrence	9	3	—
6	Vermont	1	1	—
4	Yale	4	4	—
5	Clarkson	4	3	—

Semifinals; March 13
1	Harvard	4
7	Rensselaer	1
3	St. Lawrence	7
4	Yale	0

Championship; March 14
1	Harvard	6
3	St. Lawrence	3
Third Place
4	Yale	4*
7	Rensselaer	4

Note: * denotes overtime period(s)

=== Quarterfinals ===
==== (1) Harvard vs. (8) Brown ====
March 6	Harvard	6 – 2	Brown	Bright Hockey Center

March 7	Harvard	5 – 2	Brown	Bright Hockey Center

Harvard won series 2–0

==== (2) Colgate vs. (7) Rensselaer ====
March 6	Colgate	1 – 9	Rensselaer	Starr Rink

March 7	Colgate	7 – 2	Rensselaer	Starr Rink

March 7	Colgate	0 – 2 (mini)	Rensselaer	Starr Rink

Rensselaer won series 2–1

==== (3) St. Lawrence vs. (6) Vermont ====
March 6	St. Lawrence	9 – 1	Vermont	Appleton Arena

March 7	St. Lawrence	3 – 1	Vermont	Appleton Arena

St. Lawrence won series 2–0

==== (4) Yale vs. (5) Clarkson ====
March 6	Yale	4 – 4	Clarkson	Ingalls Rink

March 7	Yale	4 – 3	Clarkson	Ingalls Rink

Yale won series 1–0–1

=== Semifinals ===
==== (1) Harvard vs. (7) Rensselaer ====
March 13	Harvard	4 – 1	Rensselaer	Boston Garden

==== (3) St. Lawrence vs. (4) Yale ====
March 13	St. Lawrence	7 – 0	Yale	Boston Garden

=== Third Place ===
==== (4) Yale vs. (7) Rensselaer ====
March 14	Yale	4 – 4	OT	Rensselaer	Boston Garden

=== Championship ===
==== (1) Harvard vs. (3) St. Lawrence ====
March 14	Harvard	6 – 3	St. Lawrence	Boston Garden

== Tournament awards ==
=== All-Tournament Team ===
None

=== MOP ===
- Lane MacDonald (Harvard)
