= Tony Hrkac =

Canadian ice hockey player

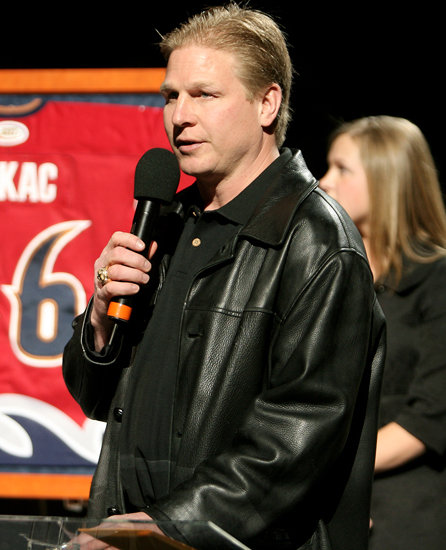
- Hrkac in 2008
- Born: July 7, 1966 (age 60) Thunder Bay, Ontario, Canada
- Height: 5 ft 10 in (178 cm)
- Weight: 170 lb (77 kg; 12 st 2 lb)
- Position: Centre
- Shot: Left
- Played for: St. Louis Blues; Quebec Nordiques; San Jose Sharks; Chicago Blackhawks; Dallas Stars; Edmonton Oilers; New York Islanders; Mighty Ducks of Anaheim; Atlanta Thrashers
- NHL draft: 32nd overall, 1984; St. Louis Blues
- Playing career: 1987–2005; 2009–2010
- Website: https://www.hrkac.com

Anthony John Hrkac (/ˈhɜːrkəs/; born July 7, 1966) is a Canadian professional ice hockey executive, former coach and former player of Croatian and Ukrainian ancestry who played eighteen seasons of professional hockey.

== Playing career ==
=== Collegiate ===
Hrkac was drafted in the second round, 32nd overall, by the St. Louis Blues in the 1984 NHL entry draft. Hrkac played collegiately at the University of North Dakota, and was the recipient of the Hobey Baker Award for top men's collegiate hockey player during the 1986–87 season. He led the team (along with future Chicago Blackhawks teammate and Hockey Hall of Fame inductee Ed Belfour) —widely known during this period as the "Hrkac Circus" (the name rhymes) — to a national championship and his 116 points that season still stands as the NCAA single-season scoring mark.

=== Professional ===
He made his National Hockey League debut with the Blues during the 1987 NHL playoffs, appearing in three games. After two-plus seasons with the Blues, he was traded (along with Greg Millen) to the Quebec Nordiques in exchange for Jeff Brown.

In his NHL career, Hrkac would play for the Blues, Nordiques, San Jose Sharks, Chicago Blackhawks, Dallas Stars, Edmonton Oilers, New York Islanders, Mighty Ducks of Anaheim, and Atlanta Thrashers. Hrkac's rights were also briefly owned by the Pittsburgh Penguins when they acquired him and Bobby Dollas from the Edmonton Oilers for forward Josef Beranek. On June 26, ten days after initially acquiring Hrkac, the Penguins lost Hrkac to the Nashville Predators in the 1998 NHL Expansion Draft. Less than two weeks later, Hrkac was moved; this time to the Dallas Stars. He was traded on July 9, 1998, for future considerations.

In 758 career NHL games, Hrkac scored 132 goals and added 239 assists. He also appeared in 41 playoff games, scoring seven goals and adding seven assists. Four of those seven goals came in one game against the Chicago Blackhawks on April 10, 1988, setting a St. Louis Blues record for most goals scored in a playoff game by one player. Hrkac was a member of the 1998–99 Dallas Stars team which won the Stanley Cup.

Hrkac returned to the minor leagues in 2003 after he was unable to sign with an NHL club. He was a key player on the Calder Cup champion Milwaukee Admirals in 2003–04. While there were rumors that the St. Louis Blues were seeking to sign him for one last stint with his original team, Hrkac retired after the 2004–05 season.

On March 14, 2008, Hrkac's number 26 jersey was retired by the AHL's Milwaukee Admirals, through his two tenures with the club between 1994 and 2005.

Hrkac came out of retirement for the 2008–09 season, at the age of 42, by signing with the AHL's Houston Aeros on March 11, 2009. Hrkac balanced his return to pro hockey with his coaching career, playing for the Aeros after the Concordia University Wisconsin season came to an end. He joined the Aeros once again during the 2009–10 season, after his coaching obligations were done for the year, before retiring for good.

== Coaching career ==
On September 19, 2006, Concordia University Wisconsin officials announced that the university added Division III men's and women's hockey to its sports line-up for the 2007–2008 school year. Hrkac was named the first men's hockey coach in Concordia history serving as coach until February 2012, with a coaching record of 10-109-10 while at Concordia.

Hrkac joined the Madison Capitols in the USHL as an assistant coach for their 2014–15 season, leaving after one year.

== Executive career ==
Following his coaching career, Hrkac spent nine seasons as a pro scout for the Tampa Bay Lightning.

In July 2024, Hrkac rejoined the Anaheim Ducks organization as the team's Director of Pro Scouting.

== Career statistics ==
			Regular season					Playoffs
Season	Team	League	GP	G	A	Pts	PIM	GP	G	A	Pts	PIM
1983–84	Orillia Travelways	OPJHL	42	52	54	106	20	—	—	—	—	—
1984–85	University of North Dakota	WCHA	36	18	36	54	16	—	—	—	—	—
1985–86	Canada	Intl	62	19	30	49	36	—	—	—	—	—
1986–87	University of North Dakota	WCHA	48	46	70	116	48	—	—	—	—	—
1986–87	St. Louis Blues	NHL	—	—	—	—	—	3	0	0	0	0
1987–88	St. Louis Blues	NHL	67	11	37	48	22	10	6	1	7	4
1988–89	St. Louis Blues	NHL	70	17	28	45	8	4	1	1	2	0
1989–90	St. Louis Blues	NHL	28	5	12	17	8	—	—	—	—	—
1989–90	Quebec Nordiques	NHL	22	4	8	12	2	—	—	—	—	—
1989–90	Halifax Citadels	AHL	20	12	21	33	4	6	5	9	14	4
1990–91	Halifax Citadels	AHL	3	4	1	5	2	—	—	—	—	—
1990–91	Quebec Nordiques	NHL	70	16	32	48	16	—	—	—	—	—
1991–92	San Jose Sharks	NHL	22	2	10	12	4	—	—	—	—	—
1991–92	Chicago Blackhawks	NHL	18	1	2	3	6	3	0	0	0	2
1992–93	Indianapolis Ice	IHL	80	45	87	132	70	5	0	2	2	2
1993–94	Peoria Rivermen	IHL	45	30	51	81	25	1	1	2	3	0
1993–94	St. Louis Blues	NHL	36	6	5	11	8	4	0	0	0	0
1994–95	Milwaukee Admirals	IHL	71	24	67	91	26	15	4	9	13	16
1995–96	Milwaukee Admirals	IHL	43	14	28	42	18	5	1	3	4	4
1996–97	Milwaukee Admirals	IHL	81	27	61	88	20	3	1	1	2	2
1997–98	Michigan K-Wings	IHL	20	7	15	22	6	—	—	—	—	—
1997–98	Dallas Stars	NHL	13	5	3	8	0	—	—	—	—	—
1997–98	Edmonton Oilers	NHL	36	8	11	19	10	12	0	3	3	2
1998–99	Dallas Stars	NHL	69	13	14	27	26	5	0	2	2	4
1999–00	New York Islanders	NHL	7	0	2	2	0	—	—	—	—	—
1999–00	Mighty Ducks of Anaheim	NHL	60	4	7	11	8	—	—	—	—	—
2000–01	Mighty Ducks of Anaheim	NHL	80	13	25	38	29	—	—	—	—	—
2001–02	Atlanta Thrashers	NHL	80	18	26	44	12	—	—	—	—	—
2002–03	Atlanta Thrashers	NHL	80	9	17	26	14	—	—	—	—	—
2003–04	Milwaukee Admirals	AHL	68	20	39	59	20	22	8	12	20	8
2004–05	Milwaukee Admirals	AHL	77	12	28	40	14	6	0	1	1	8
2008–09	Houston Aeros	AHL	12	2	2	4	4	19	4	10	14	8
2009–10	Houston Aeros	AHL	17	0	3	3	4	—	—	—	—	—
NHL totals			758	132	239	371	173	41	7	7	14	12

== Awards and honors ==
Award	Year
College
All-WCHA First Team	1986–87
AHCA West First-Team All-American	1986–87
All-NCAA All-Tournament Team	1987
Hobey Baker Award	1986–87
IHL
James Gatschene Memorial Trophy	1992–93
Leo P. Lamoureux Memorial Trophy	1992–93

-Won the Stanley Cup with the 1998-99 Dallas Stars

Awards and achievements
Preceded by Dallas Gaume	WCHA Most Valuable Player; 1986–87	Succeeded by Robb Stauber
Preceded by Dan Dorion	NCAA Ice Hockey Scoring Champion; 1986–87	Succeeded by Steve Johnson/Dave Capuano/Paul Polillo
Preceded by Scott Fusco	Winner of the Hobey Baker Award; 1986–87	Succeeded by Robb Stauber
Preceded by Mike Donnelly	NCAA Tournament Most Outstanding Player; 1987	Succeeded by Bruce Hoffort
Sporting positions
Preceded by Bill Watson	NCAA Single-Season Points Leader; 1987–Present	Succeeded by Incumbent
