= Ed Belfour =

Canadian ice hockey player (born 1965)

- Hockey Hall of Fame, 2011
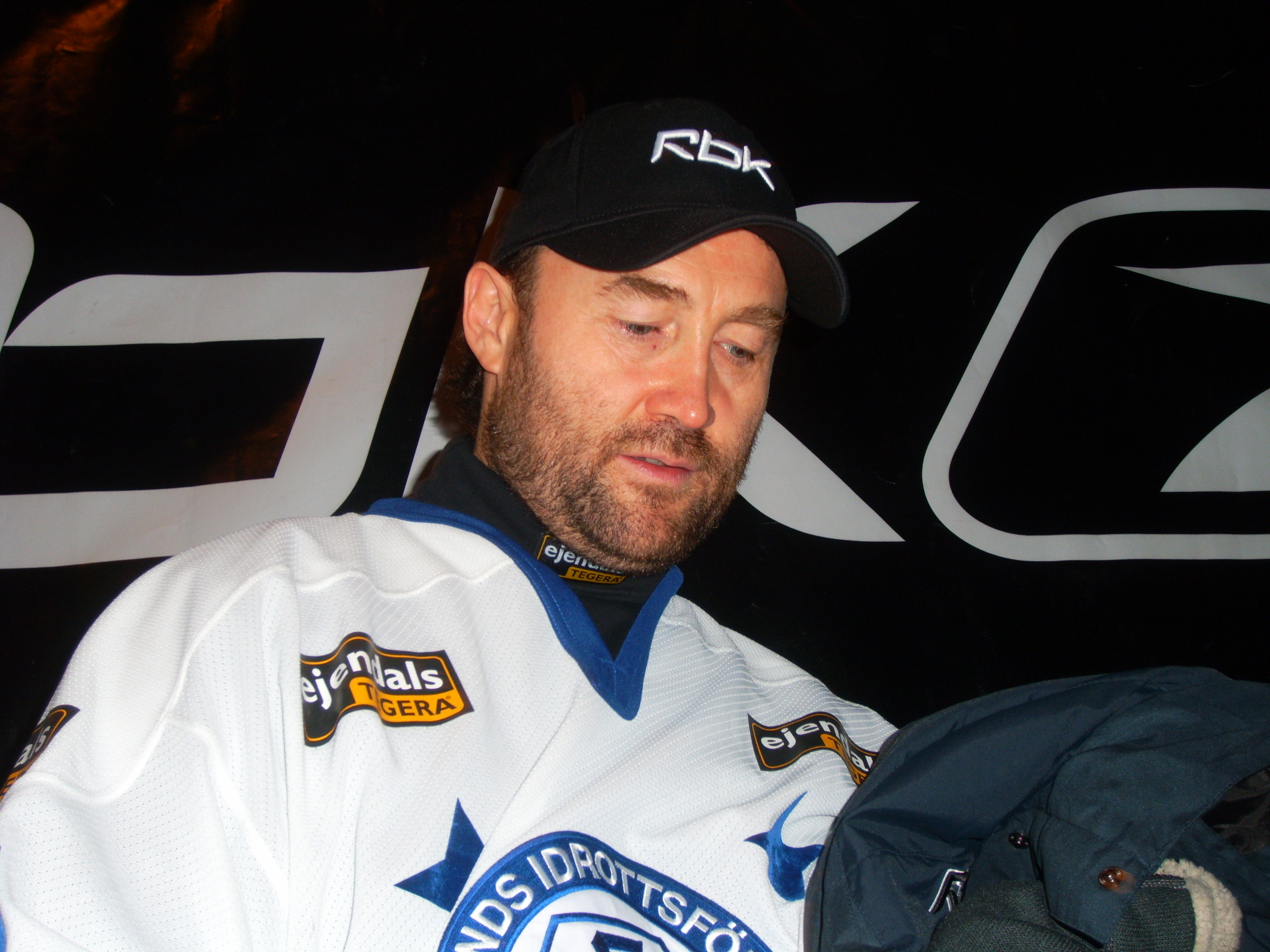
- Belfour with Leksands IF in 2008
- Born: April 21, 1965 (age 61) Carman, Manitoba, Canada
- Height: 5 ft 11 in (180 cm)
- Weight: 214 lb (97 kg; 15 st 4 lb)
- Position: Goaltender
- Caught: Left
- Played for: Chicago Blackhawks; San Jose Sharks; Dallas Stars; Toronto Maple Leafs; Florida Panthers
- National team: Canada
- NHL draft: Undrafted
- Playing career: 1989–2008
Medal record
Men's ice hockey
Representing Canada
Olympic Games
Gold medal – first place	2002 Salt Lake City
Canada Cup
Gold medal – first place	1991 Canada

Edward John Belfour (born April 21, 1965) is a Canadian former professional ice hockey goaltender. He played 17 seasons in the National Hockey League (NHL) for the Chicago Blackhawks, San Jose Sharks, Dallas Stars, Toronto Maple Leafs, and Florida Panthers.

He played junior hockey for the Winkler Flyers before going to the University of North Dakota where he helped the school win the National Collegiate Athletic Association (NCAA) championship in the 1986–87 season. After being undrafted in the 1987 NHL draft, he signed as a free agent with the Chicago Blackhawks. He played with the Saginaw Hawks of the International Hockey League (IHL) before being called up in the 1988–89 season by Chicago. Playing with Canadian National Team in 1989 rather than returning to Saginaw, the Blackhawks used him for the 1990 playoff run and kept him as the regular starter for the next six seasons, which included winning the Calder Memorial Trophy for his rookie play in 1991, winning the Vezina Trophy twice and backstopping them to the 1992 Stanley Cup Final, their first appearance in 19 years. With free agency looming, he was traded to San Jose late in the 1996–97 season. He subsequently signed as a free agent with the Dallas Stars in 1997, where he would backstop the team for five seasons and reach the Stanley Cup Final in 1999 and 2000, winning the former for his only championship. In his first season with Toronto in the 2002–03 season, he reached 400 career wins. He spent his final NHL season with Florida in 2007, where he finished with the third-most wins by a goaltender in NHL history. He played one final season with Leksands IF and retired in 2008.

Many regard Belfour as an elite goaltender and one of the best of all-time. His 484 wins rank fifth all-time among NHL goaltenders. Belfour was inducted into the Hockey Hall of Fame in the 2011 class, his first year of eligibility. In addition Belfour is one of only two players to have won an NCAA championship, an Olympic gold medal, and the Stanley Cup (the other such player is Neal Broten).

His characteristic face mask earned him the sobriquet "Eddie the Eagle", and some of his quirks and off-ice antics earned him the nickname "Crazy Eddie".

== Playing career ==
=== Juniors and college ===
Belfour played for 3 seasons in the Manitoba Junior Hockey League with the Winkler Flyers, helping the team to a first-place finish in 1986. As the starting goalie for the top team, Belfour finally received some notoriety and he joined the North Dakota Fighting Sioux for the 1986–87 season. The 21-year-old Belfour was a freshman, older than many of the upper-classmen on his team. He won 29 games that year, helping UND set a new NCAA record with 40 wins on the year and win the National Title. After the season Belfour, as an undrafted player, was able to sign with any team and signed with the Chicago Blackhawks on September 25, 1987.

=== Minors and International ===
For his first professional season, Belfour played for the Saginaw Hawks of the IHL. He won 32 games for the team and helped them reach the IHL semifinals. The following season saw Belfour split his time between the IHL and NHL, playing 23 games with the parent club. He was returned to Saginaw where he helped the team to a 2nd-place finish in the conference but faltered in the postseason and the Hawks were bounced in the first round.

Rather than return to Saginaw, Belfour played the 1989–90 season with the Canadian national men's hockey team. He was recalled by the Blackhawks for their postseason run and produced a 4–2 record with a 2.49 GAA, far better numbers than the other three Blackhawk netminders Alain Chevrier (who was traded earlier to the Pittsburgh Penguins on March 6, 1990), Jacques Cloutier, and Greg Millen.

=== Chicago Blackhawks ===
The next season, 1990–91, Belfour became the starting goalie, and had a strong rookie season. He notched 43 victories in 74 games (both NHL rookie and Blackhawk team records), finished the season with a 2.47 GAA and 4 shutouts. He also led the league in Save% (.910). It was the last time a goalie led the league in Wins, Save%, and GAA until Carey Price achieved the feat in the 2014–2015 season. For his success, he received the Calder Memorial Trophy for outstanding play by a rookie, and is the first person to receive the award under the Makarov Rule because he was a year under the new cutoff age of eligibility (26), the Vezina Trophy for best goaltender and the William M. Jennings Trophy for fewest team goals-against. He was also a finalist for the Hart Memorial Trophy as the league's most valuable player, the first rookie goaltender to do so. He would win the Vezina Trophy and Jennings Trophy again in 1993, and the Jennings Trophy once more with Chicago in 1995.

Belfour helped lead the Blackhawks to the 1992 Stanley Cup Final in the 1991–92 season, where they met the defending champion Pittsburgh Penguins. In game one, Chicago had a 4-1 lead with 8:24 remaining in the second period. However, the Penguins would score twice in the span of a minute to narrow it to 4-3 for the final period. Jaromír Jágr managed to score the tying goal with five minutes remaining, before a late one-man advantage for the Penguins proved key with Mario Lemieux putting a shot rebound past Belfour to give Pittsburgh the go-ahead lead with thirteen seconds left. In total, Belfour had allowed five goals on 39 shots. After a 3-1 loss in game two, the series moved to Chicago, where one successful shot meant everything. Kevin Stevens scored with 4:34 left in the first period off Belfour, and Penguins goaltender Tom Barrasso bested Belfour with no goals allowed on 27 shots as Pittsburgh now was one win away from the Cup. Game four was a rollercoaster for all involved, especially Belfour. Four goals were scored in the first seven minutes of the game, with each team getting two. After Stevens scored on a wrist shot over Belfour (the second goal on four shots), he was taken out by head coach Mike Keenan for Dominik Hašek. Hašek went 21-for-25 in saves as Pittsburgh rallied late again to win the game and the Finals. On August 7, Hašek was traded to the Buffalo Sabres, where he received more playing time.

By the 1995–96 season, tension was forming between Belfour and backup goalie Jeff Hackett. By January 1997, reports had surfaced that the two had an incident near a locker room that saw Belfour call Hackett "nothing more than a backup", although the two (along with their coach) asserted that they were more competitive with each other rather than having friction. A free agent after the season, Belfour was traded to the San Jose Sharks on January 25 for three players (right wing Ulf Dahlén, defenseman Michal Sýkora, goalie Chris Terreri) and a conditional second-round draft pick in the 1998 NHL entry draft after turning down an extension offer ($3.3 million) that would've raised his current rate ($2.75-million). Right after the trade, Hackett received a three-year extension deal on the same day.

Belfour finished his tenure with the Blackhawks ranking among the team leaders in many goaltending categories. Belfour finished third among all Blackhawk goalies in games played (415) and wins (201) in both categories ranking behind Hall of Famers Tony Esposito (873 games and 418 wins) and Glenn Hall (618 games and 272 wins). Belfour also ranks fourth in shutouts (30), and second in assists (17). Belfour easily ranks as the Blackhawks' goalie leader in penalty minutes, with 242. Esposito, who played in more than twice as many games and minutes as Belfour, had only 31.

=== San Jose Sharks and Dallas Stars ===
Following a dismal half-season with the Sharks, Belfour signed as a free agent with the Dallas Stars on July 2, 1997. During the season, Belfour played 61 games and had a 1.88 GAA as his team won the Presidents' Trophy and made it to the Western Conference Final only to lose to the Detroit Red Wings.

The next season, the Stars repeated their regular season championship and Belfour won his fourth William M. Jennings Trophy. In the playoffs, Belfour won duels against past Vezina- and Stanley Cup-winning goaltenders Grant Fuhr and Patrick Roy, respectively. The Stars won the Stanley Cup, beating the Buffalo Sabres in six games, capped by an incredible goalie duel against former backup Dominik Hašek that ended in a 2–1 win in the third overtime. Belfour made 53 saves to Hašek's 50, and for the entire Finals, had a 1.26 GAA to Hašek's 1.68.

Belfour backstopped his team to another consecutive finals appearance, winning his second seven-game Western Conference final duel against the Colorado Avalanche's Patrick Roy. The Stars lost the Cup in double-overtime to the New Jersey Devils. Belfour had four shutouts in that playoffs, including a triple-overtime blanking of the Devils in game five of the Final series.

During the 2001–02 season, the Stars began to play poorly and there was a falling out between then-Stars coach Ken Hitchcock and GM Bob Gainey. After a poor season, the Stars decided not to re-sign Belfour and named Marty Turco the starting goalie for the next season.

=== Toronto Maple Leafs ===
On July 2, 2002, Belfour signed as a free agent with the Toronto Maple Leafs after then Leafs goaltender, Curtis Joseph, chose to sign with the Detroit Red Wings. Belfour rebounded after a dismal season with the Stars, winning a franchise-record 37 games and helping his new team finish second in the Northeast Division. His 2.26 GAA ranked 11th in the league. During the season, he was invited to play in the mid-season All-Star Game in Florida, but a back injury forced him to miss the event. On April 1, he earned his 400th career win in a match against the Devils. In the playoffs, Belfour posted a 2.71 GAA and a .915 Save% in seven games in an opening-round loss to the Flyers. On April 16 in Game Four at the Air Canada Centre, Ed made 72 saves before losing 3–2 on an overtime goal by Mark Recchi. Belfour finished as runner-up for the Vezina Trophy, won that year by the Devils' Martin Brodeur.

In 2003–04, he posted a 34-19-6 record in 59 games as the Maple Leafs finished fourth overall in the conference standings. He recorded a 2.13 GAA and a .918 save percentage along with ten shutouts. On April 3 in the final game of the season, Belfour posted a 6–0 shutout over the Senators to secure home ice advantage in the opening round of the playoffs. That shutout gave him 10 on the season, setting a new personal best. In the playoffs, Belfour posted three shutouts in the opening round against the Senators, setting a record for shutout streaks in a series. However, in the second round, former teammate Jeremy Roenick eliminated the Leafs by putting a game 6 overtime goal past Belfour.

Belfour did not play during the NHL lockout in 2004–05, instead taking a minority stake in the projected Dallas Americans team in the proposed revival of the World Hockey Association while recovering and rehabilitating himself from primarily back-related injuries. The team had folded by October, 2004.

On November 28, 2005, Belfour won his 447th career NHL game, moving him into a tie with Terry Sawchuk for second place in career wins. Ed made 34 saves in the 2–1 win over the Florida Panthers.

On December 19, 2005, Belfour moved past Sawchuk with a 9–6 win over the New York Islanders at the Air Canada Centre. He was honoured in a special pre-game ceremony on December 23, 2005, before a game against the Boston Bruins at the Air Canada Centre; the Leafs went on to win the game. At the end of the 2005-06 season, Belfour had a record of 457-303-111 in the regular season, and 88–68 in the playoffs.

On July 1, 2006, Maple Leafs General Manager John Ferguson, Jr. released Belfour to free agency after posting a 22-22-4 record and a 3.29 GAA.

=== Florida Panthers ===
On July 25, Belfour signed with the Florida Panthers. In October 2006, Alex Auld was injured while the two goalies were horsing around. On February 13, 2007, Belfour tied Hall of Famer Tony Esposito for eighth place on the career shutout list with his 76th in the Panthers' 1-0 blanking of the Montreal Canadiens. Later in the season, another injury to Alex Auld gave Belfour the chance to become starter. He started 27 consecutive games, a record for the Panthers. Belfour regained his form during the 2006–07 season by posting a 2.79 GAA, .902 save percentage, and one shutout in 57 games.

=== Leksands IF ===
On August 27, 2007, it was announced that Belfour would play with Leksands IF in the Swedish second division. (HockeyAllsvenskan). Belfour's signing created much fanfare in the following months. He played his first professional game outside of North America in 18 years on October 31, 2007 with a 4–1 win over Sundsvall. Belfour followed up this game with a shutout streak lasting for 251 minutes, a club record in Leksand. He also broke the record for most shutouts during a whole season with 7.

During the division round, Belfour had a GAA of 1.79, which was the best of all goalies in Allsvenskan. During the playoffs, he had a GAA of 2.59 and a save percentage of .911.

== Eagle mask ==
Throughout his career, Belfour has worn masks featuring an eagle on either side of his helmet. When asked why an eagle, he stated "I've always liked the eagle as a bird. It is a strong figure representing individuality, leadership, confidence, and outstanding vision. Its hunting and aggression are characteristics I admire, so when I was thinking of what I wanted on my mask, the eagle was a natural choice". Belfour's eagle has changed dramatically, from a rough Native looking style in Chicago, to a fierce competitive image in Dallas, while the background always features his current team's colours. On the chin, there is an image of the logo for the Make-a-Wish Foundation, a charity very close to his heart, and the back plate highlights his passion for speed and restored cars. The car on the back is a 1941 Willys, along with the words Carman Racing, which is the name of Belfour's car customization and restoration shop in Freeland, Michigan. Upon seeing Belfour's eagle mask for the first time, Mike Keenan, his head coach when he started in the NHL, nicknamed him "The Eagle".

== International play ==
Belfour was selected to represent Canada at the 1991 Canada Cup Championship as the backup goaltender and was included in the squad for the 2002 Winter Olympic Team. In February 2002, Belfour won an Olympic gold medal with the Canadian men's hockey team. Although he didn't play in any of the Olympic Games in Salt Lake City, he did add depth in goal to the strong Canadian team backing up Curtis Joseph and Martin Brodeur.

== Personal life ==
Early in the 2000–01 season, on October 20, Belfour pleaded guilty to a misdemeanour charge after a woman called police when the drunken Belfour began intimidating the woman and screaming at her in a Dallas hotel room. While under arrest and being transported the local division, he allegedly offered Dallas police officers $1 billion for his release without charges. He apologized to the Dallas Stars organization and police officers involved and was fined $3,000 for resisting arrest.

Late in the 2006–07 season, Belfour, along with Panthers teammate Ville Peltonen, was arrested on April 9 outside a South Florida nightclub and was charged with disorderly intoxication and resisting an officer without violence. He was released the same day from Miami-Dade County jail on $1,500 bond.

On January 28, 2020, Belfour was arrested and booked into the Warren County Regional Jail after an early morning incident at the Kentucky Grand Hotel and Spa in downtown Bowling Green, Kentucky. Belfour was charged with third-degree criminal mischief and alcohol intoxication in a public place. Belfour damaged hotel property, and was "manifestly under the influence of alcohol to a point he was a danger to himself and others," according to the police report.

In his post-playing career he was inducted as a member of Manitoba Sports Hall of Fame The Manitoba Junior Hockey League also awards a trophy named after Belfour to its top goaltender each season.

== Career statistics ==
=== Regular season and playoffs ===
			Regular season										Playoffs
Season	Team	League	GP	W	L	T	OTL	MIN	GA	SO	GAA	SV%	GP	W	L	MIN	GA	SO	GAA	SV%
1983–84	Winkler Flyers	MJHL	14	—	—	—	—	818	68	0	4.99	—	—	—	—	—	—	—	—	—
1984–85	Winkler Flyers	MJHL	34	—	—	—	—	1973	145	1	4.41	—	7	3	4	528	41	0	4.66	—
1985–86	Winkler Flyers	MJHL	33	—	—	—	—	1943	124	1	3.83	—	—	—	—	—	—	—	—	—
1986–87	North Dakota Fighting Sioux	WCHA	33	29	4	0	—	2049	81	3	2.43	.915	—	—	—	—	—	—	—	—
1987–88	Saginaw Hawks	IHL	61	32	20	5	—	3446	183	0	3.19	—	9	4	5	561	33	0	3.52	—
1988–89	Saginaw Hawks	IHL	29	12	10	6	—	1760	92	0	3.10	—	5	2	3	298	14	0	2.81	—
1988–89	Chicago Blackhawks	NHL	23	4	12	3	—	1148	74	0	3.87	.878	—	—	—	—	—	—	—	—
1989–90	Canadian National Team	Intl	33	13	12	6	—	1808	93	0	3.09	—	—	—	—	—	—	—	—	—
1989–90	Chicago Blackhawks	NHL	—	—	—	—	—	—	—	—	—	—	9	4	2	409	17	0	2.49	.915
1990–91	Chicago Blackhawks	NHL	74	43	19	7	—	4127	170	4	2.47	.910	6	2	4	295	20	0	4.06	.891
1991–92	Chicago Blackhawks	NHL	52	21	18	10	—	2928	132	5	2.70	.894	18	12	4	949	39	1	2.46	.902
1992–93	Chicago Blackhawks	NHL	71	41	18	11	—	4106	177	7	2.59	.906	4	0	4	249	13	0	3.13	.866
1993–94	Chicago Blackhawks	NHL	70	37	24	6	—	3998	178	7	2.67	.906	6	2	4	360	15	0	2.50	.921
1994–95	Chicago Blackhawks	NHL	42	22	15	3	—	2450	93	5	2.28	.906	16	9	7	1014	37	1	2.18	.923
1995–96	Chicago Blackhawks	NHL	50	22	17	10	—	2956	135	1	2.74	.902	9	6	3	666	23	1	2.07	.929
1996–97	Chicago Blackhawks	NHL	33	11	15	6	—	1966	88	1	2.69	.907	—	—	—	—	—	—	—	—
1996–97	San Jose Sharks	NHL	13	3	9	0	—	757	43	1	3.41	.884	—	—	—	—	—	—	—	—
1997–98	Dallas Stars	NHL	61	37	12	10	—	3581	112	9	1.88	.916	17	10	7	1039	31	1	1.79	.922
1998–99	Dallas Stars	NHL	61	35	15	9	—	3536	117	5	1.99	.915	23	16	7	1544	43	3	1.67	.930
1999–00	Dallas Stars	NHL	62	32	21	7	—	3620	127	4	2.10	.919	23	14	9	1443	45	4	1.87	.931
2000–01	Dallas Stars	NHL	63	35	20	7	—	3687	144	8	2.34	.905	10	4	6	671	25	0	2.23	.910
2001–02	Dallas Stars	NHL	60	21	27	11	—	3467	153	1	2.65	.895	—	—	—	—	—	—	—	—
2002–03	Toronto Maple Leafs	NHL	62	37	20	5	—	3738	141	7	2.26	.922	7	3	4	532	24	0	2.70	.915
2003–04	Toronto Maple Leafs	NHL	59	34	19	6	—	3444	122	10	2.13	.918	13	6	7	774	27	3	2.09	.929
2005–06	Toronto Maple Leafs	NHL	49	22	22	—	4	2897	159	0	3.29	.892	—	—	—	—	—	—	—	—
2006–07	Florida Panthers	NHL	58	27	17	—	10	3289	152	1	2.77	.902	—	—	—	—	—	—	—	—
2007–08	Leksands IF	SWE-2	20	16	3	1	—	1206	36	6	1.79	.921	9	4	5	510	22	1	2.59	.911
NHL totals			963	484	320	125	14	55,696	2,317	76	2.50	.906	161	88	68	9,945	359	14	2.17	.920

== Awards and honours ==
Award	Year	Ref
MJHL
First All-Star team	1986	
Top Goaltender	1986	
College
NCAA Championship (North Dakota)	1987	
All-WCHA First Team	1987	
AHCA West Second-Team All-American	1987	
All-NCAA All-Tournament Team	1987	
IHL
First All-Star team	1988	
Rookie of the Year (shared with John Cullen)	1988	
NHL
Calder Memorial Trophy	1991	
NHL All-Rookie team	1991	
NHL First All-Star team	1991, 1993	
Vezina Trophy	1991, 1993	
William M. Jennings Trophy	1991, 1993, 1995, 1999	
NHL All-Star Game	1992, 1993, 1996, 1998, 1999, 2003	
NHL Second All-Star Team	1995	
Stanley Cup	1999	
Roger Crozier Saving Grace Award	2000	
Hockey Hall of Fame	2011	

== See also ==
- List of NHL goaltenders with 300 wins

Awards and achievements
Preceded by Sergei Makarov	Winner of the Calder Memorial Trophy; 1991	Succeeded by Pavel Bure
Preceded by Patrick Roy; Patrick Roy	Winner of the Vezina Trophy; 1991; 1993	Succeeded by Patrick Roy; Dominik Hašek
Preceded by Andy Moog, Rejean Lemelin; Patrick Roy; Dominik Hašek, Grant Fuhr; Martin Brodeur	Winner of the William M. Jennings Trophy; 1991; 1993; 1995; 1999 (with Roman Turek)	Succeeded by Patrick Roy; Dominik Hašek, Grant Fuhr; Chris Osgood, Mike Vernon; Roman Turek
Preceded by Inaugural winner	Winner of the Roger Crozier Saving Grace Award; 2000	Succeeded by Marty Turco
