= Scott Pellerin =

Canadian ice hockey player (born 1970)

- Born: January 9, 1970 (age 56) Shediac, New Brunswick, Canada
- Height: 5 ft 11 in (180 cm)
- Weight: 190 lb (86 kg; 13 st 8 lb)
- Position: Left wing
- Shot: Left
- Played for: New Jersey Devils; St. Louis Blues; Minnesota Wild; Carolina Hurricanes; Boston Bruins; Dallas Stars; Phoenix Coyotes
- NHL draft: 47th overall, 1989; New Jersey Devils
- Playing career: 1992–2004

Scott Jaque-Frederick Pellerin (born January 9, 1970) is a Canadian former professional ice hockey left winger who played in the National Hockey League between 1992 and 2004.

== Playing career ==
Pellerin was born in Shediac, New Brunswick. He played high school hockey at the Athol Murray College of Notre Dame (a boarding school) in Wilcox, Saskatchewan under coach Barry MacKenzie. In Pellerin's junior year, his midget AAA hockey team took 2nd place in the 1987 Air Canada Cup (the national midget AAA finals). His high school hockey teammates included other future NHLers including Rod Brind'Amour, Jeff Batters, Jason Herter and Joby Messier. In 1988, Pellerin's senior year, he played for the Hounds junior AA team during its 1st season in the Saskatchewan Junior Hockey League. That year, the Hounds won the Centennial Cup (the National Junior AA championship) behind goaltender Curtis Joseph.

Pellerin was drafted 47th overall by the New Jersey Devils in the 1989 NHL entry draft. He won the Hobey Baker Award as the best collegiate player in America in 1992 while playing for the University of Maine. He turned pro in 1992, joined the Devils organization and divided his time between the NHL and the AHL with the Utica Devils and then the Albany River Rats. Pellerin signed with the St. Louis Blues in 1996, where he played more ice time. His best season in the NHL came with the Blues in 1998–99 where in 80 games, he scored 20 goals and 41 points.

In 2000, Pellerin was claimed by the Minnesota Wild in the 2000 NHL Expansion Draft but was traded to the Carolina Hurricanes for the rights of Askhat Rakhmatulin and two draft picks at the trade deadline. He signed with the Boston Bruins in 2001 but after just one goal in 35 games, he was placed on waivers and eventually claimed by the Dallas Stars. In 2003, he was traded to the Phoenix Coyotes for Claude Lemieux and the rights to Guy Lanouette. Pellerin re-signed with St. Louis, but only managed two games for the team having been assigned to the AHL's Worcester IceCats. He retired in 2004. In total, Pellerin played 536 regular season games in the NHL, scoring 72 goals and 126 assists for 198 points.

Since 2015, Pellerin has served as the director of player development for the Toronto Maple Leafs of the NHL. He was promoted to Senior Director of Player Development on August 23, 2018, with Stephane Robidas promoted to take his place. Pellerin was announced as an NHL scout with the Arizona Coyotes in September 2021.

In 1997, Pellerin was inducted into the University of Maine Hall of Fame and in 2008 he was inducted into the New Brunswick Sports Hall of Fame.

== Awards and honors ==
Award	Year
All-Hockey East Rookie Team	1988–89
All-Hockey East First Team	1991–92
AHCA East First-Team All-American	1991–92
Hockey East All-Tournament Team	1992
Hobey Baker Award Winner	1992
AHL Calder Cup Champion	1994–95

== Career statistics ==
=== Regular season and playoffs ===
			Regular season					Playoffs
Season	Team	League	GP	G	A	Pts	PIM	GP	G	A	Pts	PIM
1985–86	Moncton Flyers	NBAHA	45	65	34	99	34	—	—	—	—	—
1986–87	Notre Dame Hounds	SMHL	72	62	68	130	98	—	—	—	—	—
1987–88	Notre Dame Hounds	SJHL	57	37	49	86	139	—	—	—	—	—
1987–88	Notre Dame Hounds	Cen-Cup	—	—	—	—	—	5	5	1	6	—
1988–89	University of Maine	HE	45	29	33	62	92	—	—	—	—	—
1989–90	University of Maine	HE	42	22	34	56	68	—	—	—	—	—
1990–91	University of Maine	HE	43	23	25	48	60	—	—	—	—	—
1991–92	University of Maine	HE	37	32	25	57	54	—	—	—	—	—
1991–92	Utica Devils	AHL	—	—	—	—	—	3	1	0	1	0
1992–93	New Jersey Devils	NHL	45	10	11	21	41	—	—	—	—	—
1992–93	Utica Devils	AHL	27	15	18	33	33	2	0	1	1	0
1993–94	New Jersey Devils	NHL	1	0	0	0	2	—	—	—	—	—
1993–94	Albany River Rats	AHL	73	28	46	74	84	5	2	1	3	11
1994–95	Albany River Rats	AHL	74	23	33	56	95	14	6	4	10	8
1995–96	New Jersey Devils	NHL	6	2	1	3	0	—	—	—	—	—
1995–96	Albany River Rats	AHL	75	35	47	82	142	4	0	3	3	10
1996–97	St. Louis Blues	NHL	54	8	10	18	35	6	0	0	0	6
1996–97	Worcester IceCats	AHL	24	10	16	26	37	—	—	—	—	—
1997–98	St. Louis Blues	NHL	80	8	21	29	62	10	0	2	2	10
1998–99	St. Louis Blues	NHL	80	20	21	41	42	8	1	0	1	4
1999–2000	St. Louis Blues	NHL	80	8	15	23	48	7	0	0	0	2
2000–01	Minnesota Wild	NHL	58	11	28	39	45	—	—	—	—	—
2000–01	Carolina Hurricanes	NHL	19	0	5	5	6	6	0	0	0	4
2001–02	Boston Bruins	NHL	35	1	5	6	6	—	—	—	—	—
2001–02	Dallas Stars	NHL	33	3	5	8	15	—	—	—	—	—
2002–03	Dallas Stars	NHL	20	1	3	4	8	—	—	—	—	—
2002–03	Phoenix Coyotes	NHL	23	0	1	1	8	—	—	—	—	—
2003–04	Portland Pirates	AHL	6	0	3	3	0	—	—	—	—	—
2003–04	Worcester IceCats	AHL	49	9	21	30	38	10	3	1	4	19
2003–04	St. Louis Blues	NHL	2	0	0	0	2	—	—	—	—	—
AHL totals			328	120	184	304	429	38	12	10	22	48
NHL totals			536	72	126	198	320	37	1	2	3	26

=== International ===
Year	Team	Event	GP	G	A	Pts	PIM
1990	Canada	WJC	7	2	0	2	2

Awards and achievements
Preceded by Mario Thyer	Hockey East Rookie of the Year (Shared With Rob Gaudreau); 1988–89	Succeeded by Scott Cashman
Preceded by David Emma	Hockey East Player of the Year; 1991–92	Succeeded by Paul Kariya
Preceded by David Emma	Winner of the Hobey Baker Award; 1991–92	Succeeded by Paul Kariya
Preceded by Shawn McEachern	William Flynn Tournament Most Valuable Player; 1992	Succeeded by Jim Montgomery
Sporting positions
Preceded by Sean O'Donnell	Minnesota Wild captain November 2000	Succeeded by Wes Walz
