= Mike Hurlbut =

American ice hockey player and coach

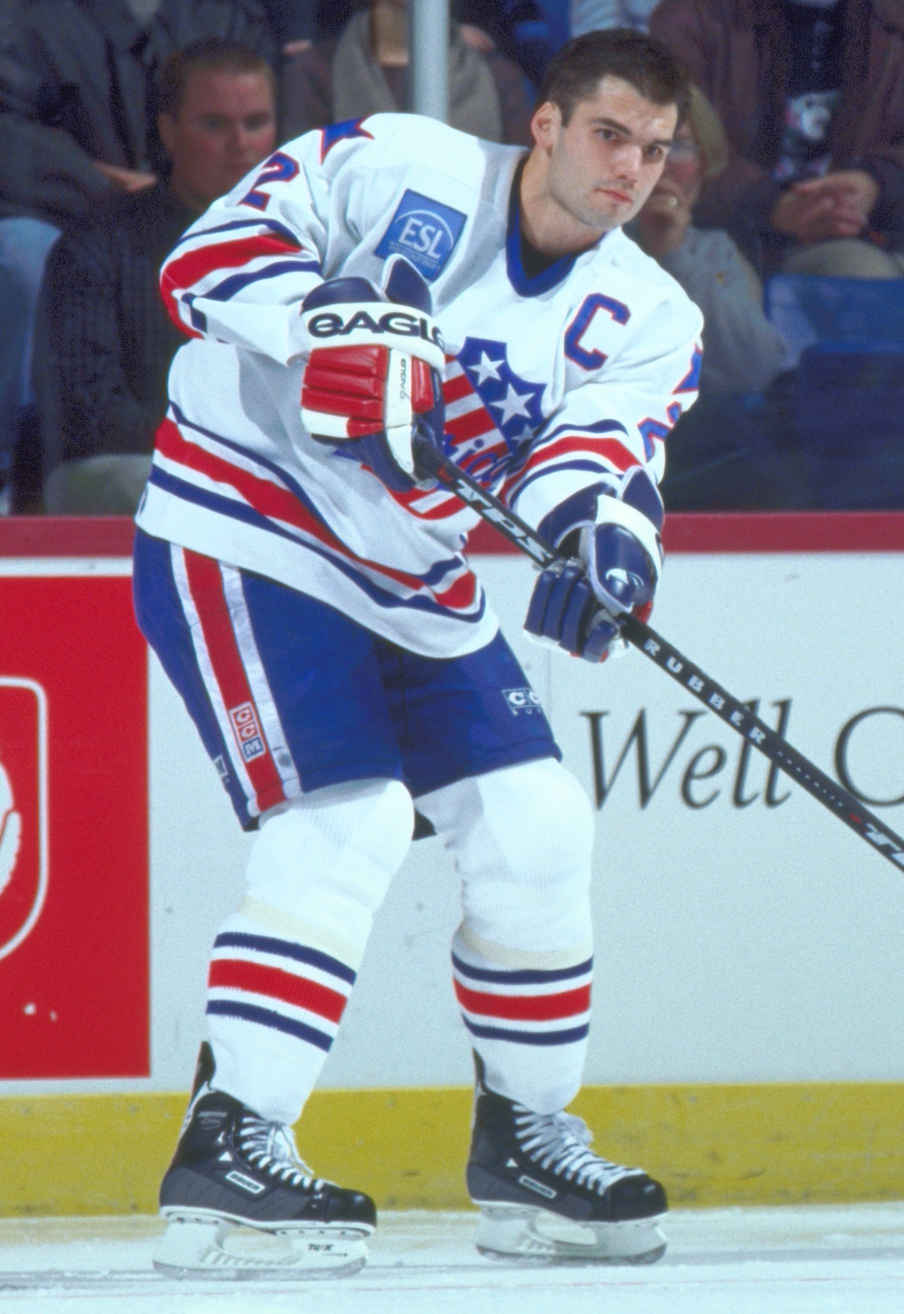
- Hurlbut in 2001
- Born: July 10, 1966 (age 58); Massena, New York, U.S.
- Height: 6 ft 2 in (188 cm)
- Weight: 206 lb (93 kg; 14 st 10 lb)
- Position: Defense
- Shot: Left
- Played for: New York Rangers; Quebec Nordiques; Buffalo Sabres
- NHL draft: 1988 NHL Supplemental Draft; New York Rangers
- Playing career: 1989–2002

Michael Ray Hurlbut (born July 10, 1966) is an American former professional ice hockey defenseman. He was drafted by the New York Rangers in the 1988 NHL Supplemental Draft. He currently serves as the associate head coach of the St. Lawrence University Men's Hockey program.

== Playing career ==
=== Collegiate ===
In 1985, he joined the St. Lawrence University Skating Saints Division I Men's Ice Hockey Program. He was recruited from the Northwood School in Lake Placid, New York. While Hurlbut was at St. Lawrence, he was a First Team All-American, as well as a First Team All ECAC. He is widely considered to be one of the best defensemen to ever play hockey for St. Lawrence.

=== Professional ===
Hurlbut played in 23 games for the Rangers during the 1992–93 season before parting ways with the franchise. He would play one game for the Quebec Nordiques during the 1993–94 season, and five more for the Buffalo Sabres near the end of the decade. The majority of his professional career was spent in the American Hockey League and International Hockey League. He retired after the 2001–02 season with the Rochester Americans, where he was the longest serving captain in franchise history. During his 14-year professional hockey career, he played in a total of 839 professional games, scored 117 goals, had 364 assists, and was a team captain in eight of his 14 pro seasons.

== Coaching career ==
In 2002, he returned to his Alma Mater, St. Lawrence University to be an assistant coach on a volunteer basis under Joe Marsh. In 2008, he was hired by the university, and became a full-time assistant coach. He was then elevated to associate head coach prior to the 2011–12 season.

== Career statistics ==
			Regular season					Playoffs
Season	Team	League	GP	G	A	Pts	PIM	GP	G	A	Pts	PIM
1985–86	St. Lawrence University	ECAC	25	2	10	12	40	—	—	—	—	—
1986–87	St. Lawrence University	ECAC	35	8	15	23	44	—	—	—	—	—
1987–88	St. Lawrence University	ECAC	38	6	12	18	18	—	—	—	—	—
1988–89	St. Lawrence University	ECAC	36	8	25	33	30	—	—	—	—	—
1988–89	Denver Rangers	IHL	8	0	2	2	13	4	1	2	3	2
1989–90	Flint Spirits	IHL	74	3	34	37	38	3	0	1	1	2
1990–91	San Diego Gulls	IHL	2	1	0	1	0	—	—	—	—	—
1990–91	Binghamton Rangers	AHL	33	2	11	13	27	3	0	1	1	0
1991–92	Binghamton Rangers	AHL	79	16	39	55	64	11	2	7	9	8
1992–93	Binghamton Rangers	AHL	45	11	25	36	46	14	2	5	7	12
1992–93	New York Rangers	NHL	23	1	8	9	16	—	—	—	—	—
1993–94	Cornwall Aces	AHL	77	13	33	46	100	13	3	7	10	12
1993–94	Quebec Nordiques	NHL	1	0	0	0	0	—	—	—	—	—
1994–95	Cornwall Aces	AHL	74	11	49	60	69	3	1	0	1	15
1995–96	Manitoba Moose	IHL	22	1	4	5	22	—	—	—	—	—
1995–96	Houston Aeros	IHL	38	3	12	15	33	—	—	—	—	—
1996–97	Houston Aeros	IHL	70	11	24	35	62	13	5	8	13	12
1997–98	Rochester Americans	AHL	45	10	20	30	48	4	1	1	2	2
1997–98	Buffalo Sabres	NHL	3	0	0	0	2	—	—	—	—	—
1998–99	Rochester Americans	AHL	72	15	39	54	46	20	4	5	9	12
1998–99	Buffalo Sabres	NHL	1	0	0	0	0	—	—	—	—	—
1999–00	Rochester Americans	AHL	74	10	29	39	83	21	5	6	11	14
1999–00	Buffalo Sabres	NHL	1	0	0	0	2	—	—	—	—	—
2000–01	Rochester Americans	AHL	53	6	26	32	36	4	1	0	1	6
2001–02	Rochester Americans	AHL	44	3	9	12	44	2	0	0	0	0
NHL totals			29	1	8	9	20	—	—	—	—	—

== Awards and honors ==
Award	Year
College
All-ECAC Hockey First Team	1988–89
AHCA East First-Team All-American	1988–89
ECAC Hockey All-Tournament Team	1989
AHL
All-Star Game	1995, 2000, 2001
Second All-Star Team	1995
