= Bob Beers (ice hockey) =

American ice hockey player (born 1967)

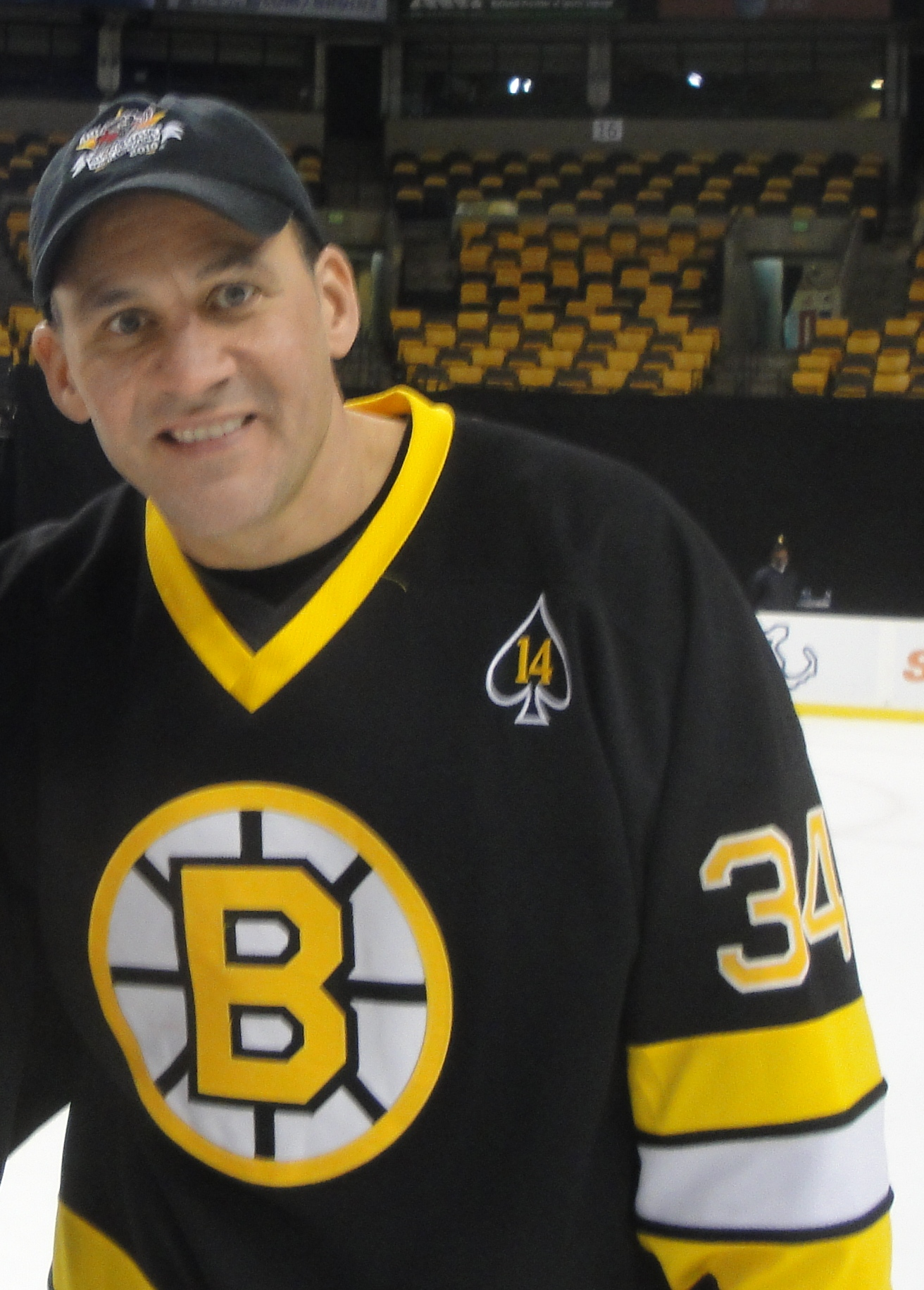
- Born: May 20, 1967 (age 58) Pittsburgh, Pennsylvania, U.S.
- Height: 6 ft 2 in (188 cm)
- Weight: 200 lb (91 kg; 14 st 4 lb)
- Position: Defense
- Shot: Right
- Played for: Boston Bruins; Tampa Bay Lightning; Edmonton Oilers; New York Islanders
- National team: United States
- NHL draft: 210th overall, 1985; Boston Bruins
- Playing career: 1989–2000

Robert Charles Beers (born May 20, 1967) is an American former professional ice hockey defenseman. He is a radio commentator on Boston Bruins broadcasts on the 98.5 The Sports Hub Bruins radio network and is an occasional contributor to NESN Bruins and College Hockey broadcasts. Beers played Division 1 College Hockey at the University of Maine, in Orono, Maine. He is one of many former Black Bear players who went on to play in the NHL.

== Career ==
As a youth, he played in the 1980 Quebec International Pee-Wee Hockey Tournament with the Buffalo Regals minor ice hockey team.

Beers was drafted in the 10th round, 210th overall, by the Boston Bruins in the 1985 NHL entry draft. He played hockey with the Buffalo Jr. Sabres, Northern Arizona University, and the University of Maine before reaching the NHL level. His career was split between the NHL, AHL and IHL. Beers represented the United States in 1993, 1994, and 1997 at the World Championships. After retiring from the NHL, the Bruins organization brought him back to play on their minor league affiliate the Providence Bruins. He played mainly in home games through parts of the 1998–99 and 1999–2000 seasons and was on the ice when Providence captured the 1999 Calder Cup.

== Career statistics ==
=== Regular season and playoffs ===
| | | | Regular season | | | | | Playoffs |
| Season | Team | League | GP | G | A | Pts | PIM | GP | G | A | Pts | PIM |
|---|---|---|---|---|---|---|---|---|---|---|---|---|
| 1985–86 | Northern Arizona University | GWHC | 28 | 2 | 22 | 24 | 58 | — | — | — | — | — |
| 1986–87 | University of Maine | H-East | 38 | 0 | 13 | 13 | 45 | — | — | — | — | — |
| 1987–88 | University of Maine | H-East | 41 | 3 | 11 | 14 | 72 | — | — | — | — | — |
| 1988–89 | University of Maine | H-East | 44 | 10 | 27 | 37 | 53 | — | — | — | — | — |
| 1989–90 | Maine Mariners | AHL | 74 | 7 | 36 | 43 | 63 | — | — | — | — | — |
| 1989–90 | Boston Bruins | NHL | 3 | 0 | 1 | 1 | 6 | 14 | 1 | 1 | 2 | 18 |
| 1990–91 | Maine Mariners | AHL | 36 | 2 | 16 | 18 | 21 | — | — | — | — | — |
| 1990–91 | Boston Bruins | NHL | 16 | 0 | 1 | 1 | 10 | 6 | 0 | 0 | 0 | 4 |
| 1991–92 | Maine Mariners | AHL | 33 | 6 | 23 | 29 | 24 | — | — | — | — | — |
| 1991–92 | Boston Bruins | NHL | 33 | 0 | 5 | 5 | 29 | 1 | 0 | 0 | 0 | 0 |
| 1992–93 | Providence Bruins | AHL | 6 | 1 | 2 | 3 | 10 | — | — | — | — | — |
| 1992–93 | Tampa Bay Lightning | NHL | 64 | 12 | 24 | 36 | 70 | — | — | — | — | — |
| 1992–93 | Atlanta Knights | IHL | 1 | 0 | 0 | 0 | 0 | — | — | — | — | — |
| 1993–94 | Tampa Bay Lightning | NHL | 16 | 1 | 5 | 6 | 12 | — | — | — | — | — |
| 1993–94 | Edmonton Oilers | NHL | 66 | 10 | 27 | 37 | 74 | — | — | — | — | — |
| 1994–95 | New York Islanders | NHL | 22 | 2 | 7 | 9 | 6 | — | — | — | — | — |
| 1995–96 | Utah Grizzlies | IHL | 65 | 6 | 36 | 42 | 54 | 22 | 1 | 12 | 13 | 16 |
| 1995–96 | New York Islanders | NHL | 13 | 0 | 5 | 5 | 10 | — | — | — | — | — |
| 1996–97 | Providence Bruins | AHL | 45 | 10 | 12 | 22 | 19 | — | — | — | — | — |
| 1996–97 | Boston Bruins | NHL | 27 | 3 | 4 | 7 | 8 | — | — | — | — | — |
| 1998–99 | Providence Bruins | AHL | 10 | 1 | 2 | 3 | 4 | — | — | — | — | — |
| 1999–00 | Providence Bruins | AHL | 13 | 0 | 4 | 4 | 14 | — | — | — | — | — |
| NHL totals | | | 258 | 28 | 79 | 107 | 225 | 21 | 1 | 1 | 2 | 122 |

== Awards and honors ==
| Award | Year |
|---|---|
| All-Hockey East Second Team | 1988–89 |
| AHCA East Second-Team All-American | 1988–89 |
| Hockey East All-Tournament Team | 1989 |

Awards and achievements
| Preceded by Bruce Racine | William Flynn Tournament Most Valuable Player; 1989 | Succeeded by Scott LaGrand |
