= Greg Brown (ice hockey) =

American ice hockey player (born 1968)

- Born: March 7, 1968 (age 58) Hartford, Connecticut, U.S.
- Height: 6 ft 0 in (183 cm)
- Weight: 195 lb (88 kg; 13 st 13 lb)
- Position: Defense
- Shot: Right
- Played for: Buffalo Sabres; Pittsburgh Penguins; Winnipeg Jets
- National team: United States
- NHL draft: 26th overall, 1986; Buffalo Sabres Coaching career

Current position
- Title: Head Coach
- Team: Boston College
- Conference: Hockey East

Biographical details
- Education: Boston College

Coaching career (HC unless noted)
- 2004–2012: Boston College (asst.)
- 2012–2018: Boston College (asso.)
- 2014: USA U20 (asst.)
- 2017: USA U20 (asst.)
- 2018: USA U20 (asst.)
- 2018–2021: New York Rangers (asst.)
- 2021–2022: Dubuque Fighting Saints
- 2022–Present: Boston College

Head coaching record
- Overall: 75–30–9 (.697)
- Tournaments: 4–2 (.667)

Accomplishments and honors

Championships
- Hockey East regular season champion (2024, 2025); Hockey East Tournament Champion (2024); Beanpot Champion (2026)

Awards
- Hockey East Coach of the Year (2024); Spencer Penrose Award (2024)
- Playing career: 1990–2003

Gregory Curtis Brown (born March 7, 1968) is an American ice hockey coach and a former professional player, most notably for the Buffalo Sabres and the Pittsburgh Penguins. He is currently the head coach of the Boston College Eagles, an NCAA Division I team competing in Hockey East. Previously, Brown was a member of the Eagles coaching staff for fourteen years from 2004–2018, serving as an assistant coach under Jerry York and later alongside him as associate head coach. He also coached under David Quinn with the New York Rangers from 2018–2021 and served as the head coach for the Dubuque Fighting Saints for the 2021–22 USHL season.

== Playing career ==
Brown was drafted in the second round, 26th overall, by the Buffalo Sabres in the 1986 NHL entry draft. Brown played his prep hockey career at St. Mark's School in Massachusetts before moving on to Boston College, where he played from 1986–1990 and amassed 120 points in 119 games. Brown skipped his sophomore season at B.C. to play for the American national men's hockey team and in the 1988 Winter Olympics in Calgary, Alberta, where he totaled four points in six games for the seventh place US team. Following his junior and senior seasons at B.C., Brown was named Hockey East player of the year and was a finalist for the Hobey Baker Award, given to the top NCAA men's ice hockey player. He was also named 1990 Athlete of the Year by USA Hockey.

Brown moved into the professional ranks for the 1990/91 season, splitting time between the Sabres and their AHL affiliate, the Rochester Americans and scoring 26 points in 80 combined games. The 39 games played in Buffalo that season represented a career high, as he would play in only 55 more NHL games over the next three seasons. Most of Brown's time with the Sabres organization was spent in Rochester, where he was part of the team's 1991 and 1993 Calder Cup finalists. Brown left the Americans during the 1992 season to again represent USA Hockey at the Winter Olympics in Albertville, France. Brown appeared in seven games for the US team, which finished in fourth place after losing to Czechoslovakia in the Bronze Medal game.

Following the 1992–93 season, Brown was released by the Sabres and signed with the San Diego Gulls of the IHL and later with the Pittsburgh Penguins. Brown scored a career-high 11 points in 36 games for the Penguins during the 1993/94 season. Brown was traded to the Winnipeg Jets during the following season, where he appeared in his final nine NHL contests.

With the exception of two brief stints with USA Hockey, Brown spent the final six seasons of his pro career in Europe, retiring after the 2002/03 season. His stops in Europe included games with Rogle Angelholm and Leksands IF in the Swedish Elite League, Feldkirch VEU of the Austrian National League, the Kloten Flyers of Nationalliga A in Switzerland, and EV Landshut and the Kölner Haie of Germany's Deutsche Eishockey Liga.

== Coaching career ==
=== Boston College ===
Following his playing career, Brown returned to Boston College, where he was named as an assistant coach on the men's hockey team for the 2004–05 season.

=== New York Rangers ===
On July 17, 2018, the New York Rangers announced that Brown would be joining David Quinn as an assistant coach for the team, along with David Oliver.

=== Dubuque Fighting Saints ===
On June 28, 2021, Brown was hired for his first head coaching position with the Dubuque Fighting Saints of the junior United States Hockey League (USHL).

=== Return to Boston College ===
Brown was named the head coach of the Boston College Eagles on May 6, 2022.

== Career statistics ==
=== Regular season and playoffs ===
| | | | Regular season | | | | | Playoffs |
| Season | Team | League | GP | G | A | Pts | PIM | GP | G | A | Pts | PIM |
|---|---|---|---|---|---|---|---|---|---|---|---|---|
| 1984–85 | St. Mark's School | HS-Prep | 24 | 16 | 24 | 40 | 12 | — | — | — | — | — |
| 1985–86 | St. Mark's School | HS-Prep | 19 | 22 | 28 | 50 | 30 | — | — | — | — | — |
| 1986–87 | Boston College | HE | 37 | 10 | 27 | 37 | 22 | — | — | — | — | — |
| 1987–88 | United States National Team | Intl | 55 | 6 | 29 | 35 | 22 | — | — | — | — | — |
| 1988–89 | Boston College | HE | 40 | 9 | 34 | 43 | 24 | — | — | — | — | — |
| 1989–90 | Boston College | HE | 42 | 5 | 35 | 40 | 42 | — | — | — | — | — |
| 1990–91 | Rochester Americans | AHL | 31 | 6 | 17 | 23 | 16 | 14 | 1 | 4 | 5 | 8 |
| 1990–91 | Buffalo Sabres | NHL | 39 | 1 | 2 | 3 | 35 | — | — | — | — | — |
| 1991–92 | United States National Team | Intl | 8 | 0 | 0 | 0 | 5 | — | — | — | — | — |
| 1991–92 | Rochester Americans | AHL | 56 | 8 | 30 | 38 | 25 | 16 | 1 | 5 | 6 | 4 |
| 1992–93 | Buffalo Sabres | NHL | 10 | 0 | 1 | 1 | 6 | — | — | — | — | — |
| 1992–93 | Rochester Americans | AHL | 61 | 11 | 38 | 49 | 46 | 16 | 3 | 8 | 11 | 14 |
| 1993–94 | Pittsburgh Penguins | NHL | 36 | 3 | 8 | 11 | 28 | 6 | 0 | 1 | 1 | 4 |
| 1993–94 | San Diego Gulls | IHL | 42 | 8 | 25 | 33 | 26 | — | — | — | — | — |
| 1994–95 | Winnipeg Jets | NHL | 9 | 0 | 3 | 3 | 17 | — | — | — | — | — |
| 1994–95 | Cleveland Lumberjacks | IHL | 28 | 5 | 14 | 19 | 22 | — | — | — | — | — |
| 1995–96 | Rögle BK | SEL | 22 | 4 | 7 | 11 | 32 | — | — | — | — | — |
| 1995–96 | Rögle BK | Allsv | 18 | 3 | 9 | 12 | 12 | 12 | 1 | 3 | 4 | 8 |
| 1996–97 | Kloten Flyers | NDA | 46 | 3 | 12 | 15 | 36 | 4 | 1 | 1 | 2 | 2 |
| 1996–97 | VEU Feldkirch | AUT | 6 | 0 | 2 | 2 | 8 | — | — | — | — | — |
| 1997–98 | Landshut EV | DEL | 43 | 1 | 17 | 18 | 4 | 6 | 2 | 4 | 6 | 12 |
| 1998–99 | Kölner Haie | DEL | 41 | 4 | 20 | 24 | 30 | — | — | — | — | — |
| 1999–00 | Kölner Haie | DEL | 56 | 2 | 12 | 14 | 32 | 10 | 0 | 4 | 4 | 8 |
| 2000–01 | Kölner Haie | DEL | 42 | 4 | 10 | 14 | 36 | — | — | — | — | — |
| 2001–02 | Leksands IF | Allsv | 31 | 8 | 15 | 23 | 73 | 10 | 3 | 6 | 9 | 14 |
| 2002–03 | Leksands IF | SEL | 30 | 2 | 8 | 10 | 32 | 5 | 1 | 0 | 1 | 10 |
| AHL totals | | | 148 | 25 | 85 | 110 | 87 | 46 | 5 | 17 | 22 | 26 |
| NHL totals | | | 94 | 4 | 14 | 18 | 86 | 6 | 0 | 1 | 1 | 4 |
| DEL totals | | | 182 | 11 | 59 | 70 | 102 | 16 | 2 | 8 | 10 | 20 |

=== International ===
| Year | Team | Event | GP | G | A | Pts | PIM |
|---|---|---|---|---|---|---|---|
| 1986 | United States | WJC | 7 | 0 | 2 | 2 | 8 |
| 1987 | United States | WJC | 7 | 1 | 1 | 2 | 2 |
| 1988 | United States | OLY | 6 | 0 | 4 | 4 | 2 |
| 1989 | United States | WC | 10 | 0 | 1 | 1 | 4 |
| 1990 | United States | WC | 10 | 2 | 3 | 5 | 0 |
| 1992 | United States | OLY | 7 | 0 | 0 | 0 | 2 |
| 1998 | United States | WC | 6 | 0 | 0 | 0 | 0 |
| 1998 | United States | WC Q | 3 | 0 | 1 | 1 | 0 |
| Junior totals | | | 14 | 1 | 3 | 4 | 10 |
| Senior totals | | | 42 | 2 | 9 | 11 | 8 |

International medals

Men's ice hockey

Representing United States

Olympic Games
| | 1988 Calgary | 7th place |
| | 1992 Albertville | 4th place |

== Transactions ==
- On June 21, 1986 the Buffalo Sabres selected Greg Brown in the second-round (#26 overall) of the 1986 entry draft.
- On September 29, 1993 the Pittsburgh Penguins signed free agent Greg Brown.
- On April 7, 1995 the Pittsburgh Penguins traded Greg Brown to the Winnipeg Jets.

== Awards and honors ==
| Award | Year |
|---|---|
| All-Hockey East Rookie Team | 1986–87 |
| All-Hockey East First Team | 1988–89 |
| AHCA East First-Team All-American | 1988–89 |
| Hockey East All-Tournament Team | 1989, 1990 |
| All-Hockey East First Team | 1989–90 |
| AHCA East First-Team All-American | 1989–90 |

== Head coaching record ==
Record table
| Season | Team | Overall | Conference | Standing | Postseason |
|---|---|---|---|---|---|
Boston College Eagles (Hockey East) (2022–present)
| 2022–23 | Boston College | 14–16–6 | 8–11–5 | 8th | |
| 2023–24 | Boston College | 34–6–1 | 20–3–1 | 1st | NCAA Runner-up |
| 2024–25 | Boston College | 27–8–2 | 18–4–2 | 1st | NCAA Manchester Regional Final |
| 2025–26 | Boston College | 20–15–1 | 13–11–0 | 4th | Hockey East Semifinals |
| Boston College: | | 95–45–10 | 59–29–8 | | |
| Total: | | 95–45–10 | | | |
National champion Postseason invitational champion Conference regular season champion Conference regular season and conference tournament champion Division regular season champion Division regular season and conference tournament champion Conference tournament champion

== Personal ==
He is the brother of former NHL winger Doug Brown and uncle of current Boston Bruins player Patrick Brown.

He coached his nephews Patrick and Christopher while they attended Boston College from 2010–2014, and 2015–2019, respectively. Both Patrick and Christopher were captains of the Eagles during their senior years.

Brown has been married to his wife, Katharine Walker Brown, since June 1993. They have two children, Ashley (born 1997) and Peyton (born in 2000).

Awards and achievements
| Preceded by Bob Motzko | Spencer Penrose Award; 2023–24 | Succeeded by Pat Ferschweiler |
| Preceded by Mike McHugh | Hockey East Player of the Year; 1988–89, 1989–90 | Succeeded by David Emma |
