= Steve Heinze =

American ice hockey player (born 1970)

- Born: January 30, 1970 (age 56) Lawrence, Massachusetts, U.S.
- Height: 5 ft 11 in (180 cm)
- Weight: 202 lb (92 kg; 14 st 6 lb)
- Position: Right wing
- Shot: Right
- Played for: Boston Bruins; Columbus Blue Jackets; Buffalo Sabres; Los Angeles Kings
- National team: United States
- NHL draft: 60th overall, 1988; Boston Bruins
- Playing career: 1992–2003

Stephen Herbert Heinze (born January 30, 1970) is an American former National Hockey League right winger. He played for the Boston Bruins, Columbus Blue Jackets, Buffalo Sabres, and Los Angeles Kings between 1992 and 2003. He was drafted in the third round, 60th overall, by the Boston Bruins in the 1988 NHL entry draft. Internationally Heinze played for the American national team at the 1992 Winter Olympics and the 2000 World Championships. Heinze was born in Lawrence, Massachusetts, but grew up in North Andover, Massachusetts.

== Playing career ==
Heinze played three seasons for Boston College earning All Hockey East Rookie Team, All Hockey East Team, All Hockey East Tournament Team, All New England and All American honors. He was inducted into the Boston College Hall of Fame in 2010. Heinze went on to play for the 1992 U.S. Olympic hockey team in Albertville, France. In March of that year, following the Olympic Games, he signed a multiyear contract with the Boston Bruins. After nine seasons with the Bruins, he joined the Columbus Blue Jackets for the 2000–01 season. The Blue Jackets traded him to the Buffalo Sabres at that season's trade deadline. He then joined the Los Angeles Kings as a free agent before the 2001–02 season, and played the final two seasons of his career there.

Because of his last name, Heinze requested to wear #57 (as in Heinz 57 ketchup) with the Bruins. However, the Bruins general manager Harry Sinden denied his request, stating that only Ray Bourque (#77) could wear an unorthodox number. Instead, Heinze wore #23 in Boston. He was granted #57 when he joined the Blue Jackets and he wore it for the remainder of his NHL career.

In his NHL career, Heinze appeared in 694 games. He scored 178 goals and added 158 assists. He also appeared in 69 NHL playoff games, scoring 11 goals and adding 15 assists.

== Career statistics ==
=== Regular season and playoffs ===
			Regular season					Playoffs
Season	Team	League	GP	G	A	Pts	PIM	GP	G	A	Pts	PIM
1986–87	Lawrence Academy	HS-Prep	23	26	24	50	—	—	—	—	—	—
1987–88	Lawrence Academy	HS-Prep	23	30	25	55	—	—	—	—	—	—
1988–89	Boston College	HE	36	26	23	49	26	—	—	—	—	—
1989–90	Boston College	HE	40	27	36	63	41	—	—	—	—	—
1990–91	Boston College	HE	35	21	26	47	35	—	—	—	—	—
1991–92	United States National Team	Intl	49	18	15	33	38	—	—	—	—	—
1991–92	Boston Bruins	NHL	14	3	4	7	6	7	0	3	3	17
1992–93	Boston Bruins	NHL	73	18	13	31	24	4	1	1	2	2
1993–94	Boston Bruins	NHL	77	10	11	21	32	13	2	3	5	7
1994–95	Boston Bruins	NHL	36	7	9	16	23	5	0	0	0	0
1995–96	Boston Bruins	NHL	76	16	12	28	43	5	1	1	2	4
1996–97	Boston Bruins	NHL	30	17	8	25	27	—	—	—	—	—
1997–98	Boston Bruins	NHL	61	26	20	46	54	6	0	0	0	6
1998–99	Boston Bruins	NHL	73	22	18	40	30	12	4	3	7	0
1999–00	Boston Bruins	NHL	75	12	13	25	36	—	—	—	—	—
2000–01	Columbus Blue Jackets	NHL	65	22	20	42	38	—	—	—	—	—
2000–01	Buffalo Sabres	NHL	14	5	7	12	8	13	3	4	7	10
2001–02	Los Angeles Kings	NHL	73	15	16	31	46	4	0	0	0	2
2002–03	Los Angeles Kings	NHL	27	5	7	12	12	—	—	—	—	—
2002–03	Manchester Monarchs	AHL	18	8	9	17	12	—	—	—	—	—
NHL totals			694	178	158	336	379	69	11	15	26	48

=== International ===
Year	Team	Event	GP	G	A	Pts	PIM
1989	United States	WJC	7	2	1	3	2
1992	United States	OLY	8	1	3	4	8
2000	United States	WC	7	0	3	3	8
Junior totals			7	2	1	3	2
Senior totals			14	2	4	6	10

== Awards and honors ==
Award	Year
All-Hockey East Rookie Team	1988–89
Hockey East All-Tournament Team	1989
All-Hockey East First Team	1989–90
AHCA East First-Team All-American	1989–90
