= 1989 Hockey East men's ice hockey tournament =

1989 Hockey East Men's ice hockey tournament
- Dates: March 3–11, 1989
- Teams: 6
- Finals site: Conte Forum; Chestnut Hill, Massachusetts
- Champions: Maine (1st title)
- Winning coach: Shawn Walsh (1st title)
- MVP: Bob Beers (Maine)
- Hockey East Men's Ice Hockey Tournaments

The 1989 Hockey East Men's Ice Hockey Tournament was the 5th tournament in the history of the conference. It was played between March 3 and March 11, 1989. Quarterfinal games were played at home team campus sites, while the final four games were played at the newly opened Conte Forum in Chestnut Hill, Massachusetts, the home venue of the Boston College Eagles. This was the final year the Hockey East championship was decided at a home venue to one of its member teams (as of 2014). By winning the tournament, Maine received the Hockey East's automatic bid to the 1989 NCAA Division I Men's Ice Hockey Tournament.

== Format ==
The tournament featured three rounds of play with each matchup being a single-elimination game. The team that finishes in seventh place is ineligible for tournament play. In the first round, the third seed and sixth seeds, and the fourth seed and fifth seeds played with the winner advancing to the semifinals. In the semifinals, the first seed and lowest remaining quarterfinalist and second seed and highest remaining quarterfinalist each play a game with the winners advancing to the championship game and the losers meeting in a consolation match. The tournament champion receives an automatic bid to the 1989 NCAA Division I Men's Ice Hockey Tournament.

== Conference standings ==
Note: GP = Games played; W = Wins; L = Losses; T = Ties; PTS = Points; GF = Goals For; GA = Goals Against

1988–89 Hockey East standings
	Conference							Overall					
	GP	W	L	T	PTS	GF	GA	GP	W	L	T	GF	GA
Boston College†	26	16	6	4	36	122	89	40	25	11	4	191	137
Maine*	26	17	9	0	34	127	97	45	31	14	0	221	158
Northeastern	26	13	11	2	28	126	120	36	18	16	2	166	155
Providence	26	13	11	2	28	106	112	42	22	18	2	166	167
Boston University	26	10	15	1	21	114	116	36	14	21	1	157	169
New Hampshire	26	9	17	0	18	75	120	34	12	22	0	111	154
Lowell	26	4	21	1	9	82	156	34	8	24	2	122	189
Championship: Maine † indicates conference regular season champion * indicates conference tournament champion

== Bracket ==
Teams are reseeded after the quarterfinals

Quarterfinals; March 3–4
3	Northeastern	5*
6	New Hampshire	4
4	Providence	3
5	Boston University	2

Semifinals; March 10
1	Boston College	6**
4	Providence	5
2	Maine	3*
3	Northeastern	2

Championship; March 11
1	Boston College	4
2	Maine	5
Consolation
3	Northeastern	2
4	Providence	3

Note: * denotes overtime period(s)

=== Quarterfinals ===
==== (3) Northeastern vs. (6) New Hampshire ====
March 4	Northeastern	5 – 4	OT	New Hampshire	Matthews Arena

==== (4) Providence vs. (5) Boston University ====
March 3	Providence	3 – 2	Boston University	Schneider Arena

=== Semifinals ===
==== (1) Boston College vs. (4) Providence ====
March 10	Boston College	6 – 5	2OT	Providence	Conte Forum

==== (2) Maine vs. (3) Northeastern ====
March 10	Maine	3 – 2	OT	Northeastern	Conte Forum

=== Consolation ===
==== (3) Northeastern vs. (4) Providence ====
March 11	Northeastern	2 – 3	Providence	Conte Forum

=== Championship ===
==== (1) Boston College vs. (2) Maine ====
March 11	Boston College	4 – 5	Maine	Conte Forum

== Tournament awards ==
=== All-Tournament Team ===
- F Steve Heinze (Boston College)
- F Guy Perron (Maine)
- F Tim Sweeney (Boston College)
- D Bob Beers* (Maine)
- D Greg Brown (Boston College)
- G Matt DelGuidice (Maine)

* Tournament MVP(s)
