= Matt DelGuidice =

American ice hockey player (born 1967)

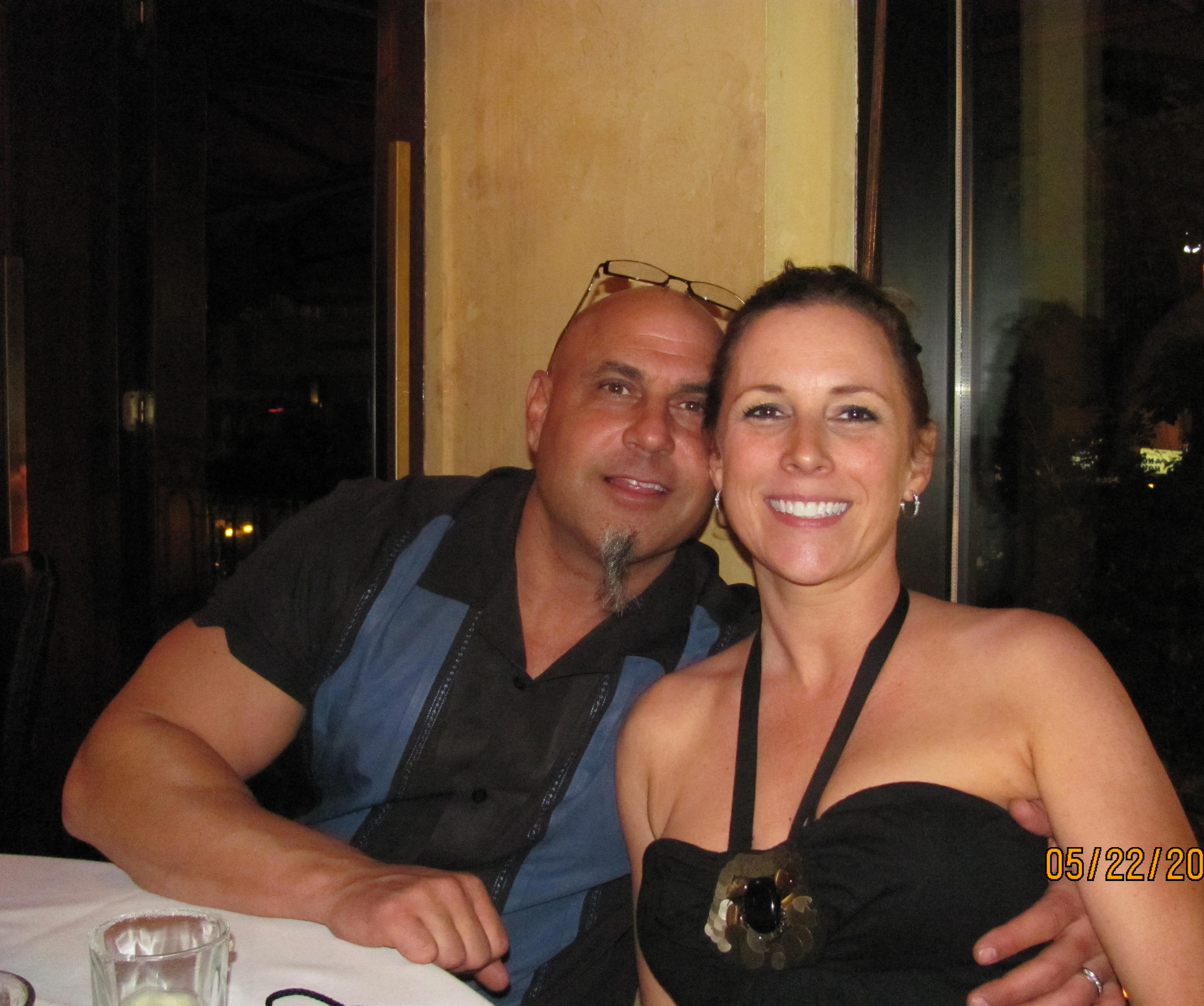
- Born: March 5, 1967 (age 59) West Haven, Connecticut, U.S.
- Height: 5 ft 10 in (178 cm)
- Weight: 170 lb (77 kg; 12 st 2 lb)
- Position: Goaltender
- Caught: Right
- Played for: Boston Bruins
- NHL draft: 77th overall, 1987; Boston Bruins
- Playing career: 1990–1999

Matthew J. DelGuidice (born March 5, 1967) is an American former professional ice hockey goaltender. He played 11 games in the National Hockey League with the Boston Bruins between 1991 and 1992. The rest of his career, which lasted from 1990 to 1999, was spent in various minor leagues.

== Playing career ==
DelGuidice started his career early, playing in Connecticut high schools, first for East Haven then on to Notre Dame, where he won the state title in his senior year. DelGuidice then went to Williston Northampton School, winning a Division 2 title. DelGuidice played in the NCAA with St. Anselm College during the Hawks' 1986-87 season, and compiling a 13-11-3 record, and a .916 save percentage. He would also receive Second Team All-American honors.

In 1987, the Boston Bruins selected DelGuidice in the fourth round of the NHL draft. DelGuidice joined the University of Maine team, sitting out the 1987-88 season as the result of transferring. In 1988-89, DelGuidice split playing time with Scott King, appearing in 20 games, with a 16-4-0 record, then going 3-1 in the post-season. Back for the 1989-90 season, DelGuidice played 23 games behind King, again amassing a 16-4-0 mark and another 3-1 record in five games of post-season play.

After his college career ended, DelGuidice went into the pro ranks with the Maine Mariners of the AHL for the 1990-91 season. Taking over as starter playing 52 games, a respectable 23-18-9 record, and a 1-1 record in two playoff games. DelGuidice was called up to Boston, he played a game in relief for Andy Moog. In 1991-92, DelGuidice became the back-up straight from training camp, he would get some net time with two stretches in Boston. DelGuidice played 10 games for Boston, 2-5-1. DelGuidice was put into the AHL after his stint in Europe with the pre Olympic team. With the Mariners a 5-15-0 record. The Bruins affiliate moved to Providence, DelGuidice would only play nine games, 0-7-1 record. He then went to the IHL's San Diego Gulls played in one game, no-decision.

With no contract in the NHL in 1993-94, DelGuidice bounced around the minor leagues. Spending mostly with the Raleigh IceCaps of the ECHL. He played 31 games with a solid 18-9-4 record, also a 6-6 record in the playoffs. He also spent time in the AHL, playing in five games for the Albany River Rats 1-2-2 and one game for the Springfield Indians 0-0-1.

In 1994-95 season DelGuidice traveled between teams. ECHL, mostly for the Nashville Knights, 18 games a 7-8-2 record, 0-1 record in two playoffs. He also played for the Charlotte Checkers, five games 2-2-1. Also the IHL Atlanta Knights, one game. In 1995-96 season DelGuidice played the ECHL's Roanoke Express. Playing 35 games, 13-10-3 record, 0-1 record in two playoff games.

In 1996-97 DelGuidice played in the Western Professional League the Amarillo Rattlers. DelGuidice would go 13-26-7 in 49 games on a team that had 17 wins all season. 1997-98 season DelGuidice played only 31 games a 7-17-4 record for Amarillo. He then was traded to the Monroe Moccasins playing 16 games, 9-7-0. DelGuidice stayed with Monroe for the 1998-99 season he played eight games, 5-3-0. Then getting traded to Corpus Christi Ice Rays, playing only four games 1-2-1. That would be his last team, he hung up his skates and pads when the season finished.

In 91 DelGuidice trained with Team US for the last Labbats Blue Canada Cup, being one of four goalies invited; playing half game against Team Canada in Montreal. Also in 91, DelGuidice played on the US Olympic Team pre Olympics, stopping in Germany in 93, playing for the Elite League.

DelGuidice also played in Roller Hockey International, a summer roller hockey league, from 1994 to 1996. He played 37 games with an 11-16-4 record. DelGuidice played for the San Diego Barracudas, New Jersey Rockin' Rollers, and Ottawa Loggers.

== Post-hockey career ==
After retirement, DelGuidice moved to Chicago in 2000. He went to work for an industrial auction company and has been in the industry for over ten years.

== Career statistics ==
=== Regular season and playoffs ===
			Regular season									Playoffs
Season	Team	League	GP	W	L	T	MIN	GA	SO	GAA	SV%	GP	W	L	MIN	GA	SO	GAA	SV%
1986–87	Saint Anselm College	NCAA-III	24	5	11	3	1437	76	0	3.17	—	—	—	—	—	—	—	—	—
1988–89	University of Maine	HE	20	16	4	0	1090	57	1	3.14	—	4	3	1	254	16	0	3.78	—
1989–90	University of Maine	HE	23	16	4	0	1257	68	0	3.25	—	5	3	1	244	15	0	3.69	—
1990–91	Boston Bruins	NHL	1	0	0	0	10	0	0	0.00	1.000	—	—	—	—	—	—	—	—
1990–91	Maine Mariners	AHL	52	23	18	9	2893	160	2	3.32	.890	2	1	1	82	5	0	3.66	—
1991–92	Boston Bruins	NHL	10	2	5	1	429	28	0	3.96	.883	—	—	—	—	—	—	—	—
1991–92	Maine Mariners	AHL	25	5	15	0	1369	101	0	4.43	.866	—	—	—	—	—	—	—	—
1992–93	Providence Bruins	AHL	9	0	7	1	478	58	0	7.28	.789	—	—	—	—	—	—	—	—
1992–93	San Diego Gulls	IHL	1	0	0	0	20	2	0	6.00	.600	—	—	—	—	—	—	—	—
1993–94	Albany River Rats	AHL	5	1	2	2	309	19	0	3.68	.881	—	—	—	—	—	—	—	—
1993–94	Springfield Indians	AHL	1	0	0	1	65	3	0	2.77	.943	—	—	—	—	—	—	—	—
1993–94	Raleigh IceCaps	ECHL	31	18	9	4	1877	92	1	2.94	.903	12	6	6	706	37	0	3.14	—
1994–95	Charlotte Checkers	ECHL	5	2	2	1	303	15	0	2.97	.892	—	—	—	—	—	—	—	—
1994–95	Nashville Knights	ECHL	18	7	8	2	1009	81	0	4.82	.862	2	0	1	74	6	0	4.84	—
1994–95	Atlanta Knights	IHL	1	0	0	0	52	5	0	5.70	.737	—	—	—	—	—	—	—	—
1995–96	Roanoke Express	ECHL	35	13	10	3	1738	103	3	3.56	.886	2	0	1	60	3	0	2.98	.914
1996–97	Amarillo Rattlers	WPHL	49	13	26	7	2620	193	0	4.42	.884	—	—	—	—	—	—	—	—
1997–98	Amarillo Rattlers	WPHL	31	7	17	4	1598	124	0	4.65	.863	—	—	—	—	—	—	—	—
1997–98	Monroe Moccasins	WPHL	16	9	7	0	922	48	2	3.12	.906	—	—	—	—	—	—	—	—
1998–99	Monroe Moccasins	WPHL	8	5	3	0	478	36	0	4.52	.855	—	—	—	—	—	—	—	—
1998–99	Corpus Christi IceRays	WPHL	4	1	2	1	199	11	0	3.32	.875	—	—	—	—	—	—	—	—
NHL totals			11	2	5	1	435	28	0	3.87	.886	—	—	—	—	—	—	—	—

== Awards and honors ==
Award	Year
Hockey East All-Tournament Team	1989
