= Jeff Batters =

Canadian ice hockey player (1970–1996)

- Born: October 23, 1970 Victoria, British Columbia, Canada
- Died: August 23, 1996 (aged 25) near Banff, Alberta, Canada
- Height: 6 ft 2 in (188 cm)
- Weight: 210 lb (95 kg; 15 st 0 lb)
- Position: Defence
- Shot: Right
- Played for: St. Louis Blues
- NHL draft: 135th overall, 1989; St. Louis Blues
- Playing career: 1992–1996

Jeffrey William Batters (October 23, 1970 – August 23, 1996) was a Canadian professional ice hockey defenceman. He played 16 games in the National Hockey League with the St. Louis Blues, from 1993 until 1995.

== Biography ==
Batters attended high school at the Athol Murry College of Notre Dame in Wilcox, Saskatchewan where he played for the Notre Dame Hounds. His midget AAA hockey team took 2nd place in the Air Canada Cup (the national midget AAA finals) in 1987. His high school teammates included future NHLers Rod Brind'Amour and Scott Pellerin (the 1992 Hobey Baker Award winner).

Batters signed as a free agent with the San Jose Sharks in September 1995. He spent the entire 1995–96 season with the Kansas City Blades where he amassed 223 penalty minutes in 77 games. He died at age 26 as one of two fatalities after a pickup truck he was a passenger in, drifted off the highway and tumbled into a ditch near Banff, Alberta on August 23, 1996.

== Career statistics ==
=== Regular season and playoffs ===
			Regular season					Playoffs
Season	Team	League	GP	G	A	Pts	PIM	GP	G	A	Pts	PIM
1987–88	Notre Dame Hounds	SJHL	58	5	20	25	167	—	—	—	—	—
1988–89	University of Alaska-Anchorage	NCAA	33	8	14	22	123	—	—	—	—	—
1989–90	University of Alaska-Anchorage	NCAA	34	6	9	15	102	—	—	—	—	—
1990–91	University of Alaska-Anchorage	NCAA	39	16	14	30	90	—	—	—	—	—
1991–92	University of Alaska-Anchorage	NCAA	34	6	17	23	86	—	—	—	—	—
1992–93	Peoria Rivermen	IHL	74	5	18	23	113	4	0	0	0	10
1993–94	St. Louis Blues	NHL	6	0	0	0	7	—	—	—	—	—
1993–94	Peoria Rivermen	IHL	59	3	9	12	175	6	0	0	0	18
1994–95	St. Louis Blues	NHL	10	0	0	0	21	—	—	—	—	—
1994–95	Peoria Rivermen	IHL	42	0	11	11	128	5	0	1	1	18
1995–96	Kansas City Blades	IHL	77	5	29	34	223	5	0	1	1	12
IHL totals			252	13	67	80	639	20	0	2	2	58
NHL totals			16	0	0	0	28	—	—	—	—	—

== See also ==
- List of ice hockey players who died during their playing career
