= David Emma =

American ice hockey player (born 1969)

- Born: January 14, 1969 (age 57) Cranston, Rhode Island, U.S.
- Height: 5 ft 10 in (178 cm)
- Weight: 185 lb (84 kg; 13 st 3 lb)
- Position: Right wing
- Shot: Left
- Played for: New Jersey Devils; Boston Bruins; Florida Panthers
- National team: United States
- NHL draft: 110th overall, 1989; New Jersey Devils
- Playing career: 1991–2001

David Anaclethe Emma (born January 14, 1969) is an American former ice hockey player. Emma won the Hobey Baker Award in 1991 playing for Boston College. Emma would go on to play professionally in the National Hockey League for the New Jersey Devils, Boston Bruins, and Florida Panthers. As of 2011, he is a wealth management advisor for Masterson, Emma & Associates.

Emma attended Bishop Hendricken High School. He later attended Boston College where he was named an All-American and selected for All-Hockey East Teams during his four-year career.

Internationally, Emma has represented the United States at the 1992 Winter Olympics and Ice Hockey World Championships. Emma was inducted into the Rhode Island Hockey Hall of Fame in 2019.

== Awards and honors ==
Award	Year
All-Hockey East Rookie Team	1987–88
All-Hockey East Second Team	1988–89
All-Hockey East First Team	1989–90; 1990–91
AHCA East First-Team All-American	1989–90; 1990–91
Hockey East All-Tournament Team	1990

== Career statistics ==
=== Regular season and playoffs ===
			Regular season					Playoffs
Season	Team	League	GP	G	A	Pts	PIM	GP	G	A	Pts	PIM
1986–87	Bishop Hendricken	High-RI	—	—	—	—	—	—	—	—	—	—
1987–88	Boston College	HE	30	19	16	35	30	—	—	—	—	—
1988–89	Boston College	HE	36	20	31	51	36	—	—	—	—	—
1989–90	Boston College	HE	42	38	34	72	46	—	—	—	—	—
1990–91	Boston College	HE	39	35	46	81	44	—	—	—	—	—
1991–92	United States	Intl.	55	15	16	31	32	—	—	—	—	—
1991–92	Utica Devils	AHL	15	4	7	11	12	4	1	1	2	2
1992–93	New Jersey Devils	NHL	2	0	0	0	0	—	—	—	—	—
1992–93	Utica Devils	AHL	61	21	40	61	47	5	2	1	3	6
1993–94	New Jersey Devils	NHL	15	5	5	10	2	—	—	—	—	—
1993–94	Albany River Rats	AHL	56	26	29	55	53	5	1	2	3	8
1994–95	New Jersey Devils	NHL	6	0	1	1	0	—	—	—	—	—
1994–95	Albany River Rats	AHL	1	0	0	0	0	—	—	—	—	—
1995–96	Detroit Vipers	IHL	79	30	32	62	75	11	5	2	7	2
1996–97	Boston Bruins	NHL	5	0	0	0	0	—	—	—	—	—
1996–97	Providence Bruins	AHL	53	10	18	28	24	—	—	—	—	—
1996–97	Phoenix Roadrunners	IHL	8	0	4	4	4	—	—	—	—	—
1997–98	EC KAC	Alp	16	6	17	23	—	—	—	—	—	—
1997–98	EC KAC	AUT	33	22	22	44	48	—	—	—	—	—
1998–99	EC KAC	Alp	26	15	32	47	49	—	—	—	—	—
1998–99	EC KAC	AUT	15	8	7	15	16	—	—	—	—	—
1999–2000	EC KAC	IEHL	32	26	28	54	28	—	—	—	—	—
1999–2000	EC KAC	AUT	15	9	6	15	18	—	—	—	—	—
2000–01	Florida Panthers	NHL	6	0	0	0	0	—	—	—	—	—
2000–01	Louisville Panthers	AHL	55	22	28	50	63	—	—	—	—	—
2000–01	Portland Pirates	AHL	16	2	8	10	6	2	0	0	0	0
AHL totals			257	85	130	215	205	16	4	4	8	16
NHL totals			34	5	6	11	2	—	—	—	—	—
AUT totals			63	39	35	74	82	—	—	—	—	—

=== International ===
Year	Team	Event	GP	G	A	Pts	PIM
1988	United States	WJC	7	0	0	0	2
1989	United States	WJC	7	6	2	8	6
1991	United States	WC	10	1	0	1	8
1992	United States	OG	6	0	1	1	6
1999	United States	WC	6	1	3	4	0
Junior totals			14	6	2	8	8
Senior totals			22	2	4	6	14

Awards and achievements
Preceded by Greg Brown	Hockey East Player of the Year; 1990–91	Succeeded by Scott Pellerin
Preceded by Tim Sweeney	Hockey East Scoring Champion; 1989–90, 1990–91	Succeeded by Mike Boback
Preceded by Kip Miller	Winner of the Hobey Baker Award; 1990–91	Succeeded by Scott Pellerin
