= Myles O'Connor =

Canadian ice hockey player (1967–2026)

- Born: April 2, 1967 Calgary, Alberta, Canada
- Died: October 6, 2026 (aged 59) Calgary, Alberta, Canada
- Height: 5 ft 11 in (180 cm)
- Weight: 185 lb (84 kg; 13 st 3 lb)
- Position: Defence
- Shot: Left
- Played for: New Jersey Devils; Mighty Ducks of Anaheim
- NHL draft: 45th overall, 1985; New Jersey Devils
- Playing career: 1989–1997

Myles O'Connor (April 2, 1967 – October 6, 2026) was a Canadian professional ice hockey defenceman. He played in the National Hockey League for the New Jersey Devils and the Mighty Ducks of Anaheim and played 43 regular season games between 1990 and 1994, scoring three goals and four assists for seven points, collecting 69 penalty minutes.

== Playing career ==
Born in Calgary, Alberta, O'Connor was drafted 45th overall by the Devils in the 1985 NHL entry draft. He played four years for the University of Michigan hockey program before turning pro at the end of the 1988-89 college season. O'Connor spent five years with the Devils organization, splitting time between the AHL and NHL. From 1993 to 1996 O'Connor played five games with the Mighty Ducks of Anaheim and spent the rest of the time playing in the IHL. He spent the 1997–98 season playing in Japan before retiring.

== Personal life and death ==
After his playing career ended, O'Connor returned to Calgary to work for his family's clothing store, O'Connors. He eventually took over the business, which is one of Canada's largest independent retailers.

His son Logan O'Connor also became a professional hockey player, and debuted with the Colorado Avalanche in 2019.

O'Connor died on October 6, 2026. He was 59.

== Career statistics ==
=== Regular season and playoffs ===
			Regular season					Playoffs
Season	Team	League	GP	G	A	Pts	PIM	GP	G	A	Pts	PIM
1984–85	Notre Dame Hounds	U18 AAA	40	20	35	55	4 0	—	—	—	—	—
1985–86	University of Michigan	CCHA	37	6	19	25	73	—	—	—	—	—
1985–86	Canadian National Team	Intl	8	0	0	0	0	—	—	—	—	—
1986–87	University of Michigan	CCHA	39	15	30	45	111	—	—	—	—	—
1987–88	University of Michigan	CCHA	40	9	25	34	78	—	—	—	—	—
1988–89	University of Michigan	CCHA	40	3	31	34	91	—	—	—	—	—
1988–89	Utica Devils	AHL	1	0	0	0	0	—	—	—	—	—
1989–90	Utica Devils	AHL	76	14	33	47	124	5	1	2	3	26
1990–91	New Jersey Devils	NHL	22	3	1	4	41	—	—	—	—	—
1990–91	Utica Devils	AHL	33	6	17	23	62	—	—	—	—	—
1991–92	New Jersey Devils	NHL	9	0	2	2	13	—	—	—	—	—
1991–92	Utica Devils	AHL	66	9	39	48	184	—	—	—	—	—
1992–93	New Jersey Devils	NHL	7	0	0	0	9	—	—	—	—	—
1992–93	Utica Devils	AHL	9	1	5	6	10	—	—	—	—	—
1993–94	Mighty Ducks of Anaheim	NHL	5	0	1	1	6	—	—	—	—	—
1993–94	San Diego Gulls	IHL	39	1	13	14	117	9	1	4	5	83
1994–95	San Diego Gulls	IHL	16	1	4	5	50	5	0	1	1	0
1995–96	Houston Aeros	IHL	80	2	24	26	256	—	—	—	—	—
1996–97	Houston Aeros	IHL	3	0	0	0	6	—	—	—	—	—
1996–97	Cincinnati Cyclones	IHL	62	0	4	4	241	3	0	0	0	34
1997–98	Nippon Paper Cranes	JIHL	31	4	11	15	107
AHL totals			185	30	94	124	380	5	1	2	3	26
IHL totals			200	4	45	49	670	17	1	5	6	117
NHL totals			43	3	4	7	69	—	—	—	—	—

== Awards and honours ==
Award	Year
All-CCHA First Team	1988–89
AHCA West First-Team All-American	1988–89
