= 1988–89 NCAA Division I men's ice hockey season =

- Duration: October 1988– April 1, 1989
- NCAA tournament: 1989
- National championship: St. Paul Civic Center; Saint Paul, Minnesota
- NCAA champion: Harvard
- Hobey Baker Award: Lane MacDonald (Harvard)

The 1988–89 NCAA Division I men's ice hockey season began in October 1988 and concluded with the 1989 NCAA Division I Men's Ice Hockey Tournament's championship game on April 1, 1989 at the St. Paul Civic Center in Saint Paul, Minnesota. This was the 42nd season in which an NCAA ice hockey championship was held and is the 95th year overall where an NCAA school fielded a team.

== Season Outlook ==
=== Pre-season polls ===
The top teams in the nation as ranked before the start of the season.

The WMPL poll was voted on by coaches. The College Hockey Statistics Bureau (CHSB) / WMEB poll was voted on by media.

The College Hockey Statistics Bureau started ranking 15 teams in 1988.

KBJR-TV of Duluth, Minnesota started a coaches poll for its nationally syndicated show, College Hockey USA. For unknown reasons, the station stopped conducting the poll at the end of January 1990.

WMPL Poll
| Rank | Team |
|---|---|
| 1 | Minnesota |
| 2 | Lake Superior State |
| 3 | North Dakota |
| 4 | Michigan State |
| 5 | Denver |
| 6 | Bowling Green |
| 7 | Harvard |
| 8 | Western Michigan |
| 9 | Maine |
| 10 | Wisconsin |

CHSB / WMEB Poll
| Rank | Team |
|---|---|
| 1 | Minnesota (11) |
| 2 | Lake Superior State (1) |
| 3 | Michigan State |
| 4 | Harvard |
| 5 | Maine |
| 6 | North Dakota |
| 7 | Boston College |
| 8 | Denver |
| 9 | Cornell |
| 10 | Western Michigan |
| 11 | Boston University |
| 12 | Bowling Green |
| 13 | Vermont |
| 14 | Wisconsin |
| 15 | St. Lawrence |

KBJR Poll
| Rank | Team |
|---|---|
| 1 | Minnesota |
| 2 | Michigan State |
| 3 | North Dakota |
| 4 | Harvard |
| 5 | Lake Superior State |
| 6 | Maine |
| 7 | Bowling Green |
| 8 | Michigan Tech |
| 9 | Denver |
| 10 | Boston College |

== Regular season ==
=== Season tournaments ===
| Tournament | Dates | Teams | Champion |
|---|---|---|---|
| Maine Kickoff | October 28–29 | 4 | Maine |
| Jeep/Nissan Classic | December 17–18 | 4 | Alaska–Anchorage |
| Dexter Shoe Classic | December 27–28 | 4 | Maine |
| Syracuse Invitational | December 28–29 | 4 | Bowling Green |
| Great Lakes Invitational | December 29–30 | 4 | Michigan |
| Rensselaer Holiday Tournament | December 29–30 | 4 | Providence |
| Riverfront Invitational | December 29–30 | 4 | Boston College |
| Auld Lang Syne Classic | December 30–31 | 4 | Northeastern |
| Beanpot | February 6, 13 | 4 | Harvard |

=== Standings ===
1988–89 American Collegiate Hockey Association standings
| | Conference | | | | | | | Overall | | | | | |
| | GP | W | L | T | Ptc. | GF | GA | GP | W | L | T | GF | GA |
|---|---|---|---|---|---|---|---|---|---|---|---|---|---|
| Michigan–Dearborn † | 12 | 10 | 1 | 1 | .875 | - | - | 36 | 21 | 12 | 3 | - | - |
| Notre Dame | 11 | 3 | 7 | 1 | .318 | 39 | 50 | 38 | 10 | 26 | 2 | 127 | 189 |
| Lake Forest | 11 | 3 | 8 | 0 | .273 | 34 | 56 | 24 | 14 | 9 | 1 | 131 | 95 |
| Kent State | 0 | 0 | 0 | 0 | - | - | - | 0 | 0 | 0 | 0 | - | - |
Championship: Cancelled † indicates division regular season champion

1988–89 Central Collegiate Hockey Association standings
| | Conference | | | | | | | Overall | | | | | |
| | GP | W | L | T | PTS | GF | GA | GP | W | L | T | GF | GA |
|---|---|---|---|---|---|---|---|---|---|---|---|---|---|
| Michigan State†* | 32 | 25 | 6 | 1 | 51 | 188 | 95 | 47 | 37 | 9 | 1 | 277 | 150 |
| Lake Superior State | 32 | 19 | 7 | 6 | 44 | 128 | 90 | 46 | 29 | 11 | 6 | 186 | 129 |
| Illinois-Chicago | 32 | 18 | 10 | 4 | 40 | 132 | 120 | 42 | 23 | 14 | 5 | 178 | 154 |
| Michigan | 32 | 17 | 11 | 4 | 38 | 137 | 118 | 41 | 22 | 15 | 4 | 177 | 154 |
| Bowling Green | 32 | 15 | 14 | 3 | 33 | 131 | 125 | 47 | 26 | 18 | 3 | 202 | 171 |
| Western Michigan | 32 | 9 | 17 | 6 | 24 | 121 | 145 | 43 | 14 | 23 | 6 | 182 | 200 |
| Ferris State | 32 | 9 | 18 | 5 | 23 | 99 | 144 | 40 | 12 | 22 | 6 | 126 | 171 |
| Ohio State | 32 | 7 | 20 | 5 | 19 | 106 | 160 | 40 | 9 | 26 | 5 | 141 | 215 |
| Miami | 32 | 8 | 24 | 0 | 16 | 125 | 170 | 38 | 11 | 27 | 0 | 158 | 198 |
Championship: Michigan State † indicates conference regular season champion * indicates conference tournament champion

1988–89 ECAC Hockey standings
| | Conference | | | | | | | Overall | | | | | |
| | GP | W | L | T | PTS | GF | GA | GP | W | L | T | GF | GA |
|---|---|---|---|---|---|---|---|---|---|---|---|---|---|
| Harvard† | 22 | 20 | 2 | 0 | 40 | 130 | 49 | 34 | 31 | 3 | 0 | 191 | 89 |
| St. Lawrence* | 22 | 18 | 4 | 0 | 36 | 99 | 56 | 36 | 29 | 7 | 0 | 169 | 95 |
| Colgate | 22 | 15 | 6 | 1 | 31 | 108 | 82 | 31 | 19 | 10 | 2 | 161 | 118 |
| Clarkson | 22 | 13 | 7 | 2 | 28 | 104 | 87 | 32 | 16 | 13 | 3 | 135 | 129 |
| Cornell | 22 | 13 | 9 | 0 | 26 | 76 | 74 | 30 | 16 | 13 | 1 | 113 | 100 |
| Vermont | 22 | 13 | 9 | 0 | 26 | 108 | 73 | 34 | 20 | 13 | 1 | 158 | 116 |
| Yale | 22 | 10 | 12 | 0 | 20 | 72 | 84 | 31 | 11 | 19 | 1 | 99 | 137 |
| Rensselaer | 22 | 8 | 12 | 2 | 18 | 74 | 82 | 32 | 12 | 17 | 3 | 118 | 123 |
| Dartmouth | 22 | 7 | 14 | 1 | 15 | 70 | 96 | 26 | 8 | 17 | 1 | 82 | 113 |
| Army | 22 | 6 | 15 | 1 | 13 | 62 | 108 | 30 | 13 | 16 | 1 | 93 | 125 |
| Princeton | 22 | 4 | 17 | 1 | 9 | 73 | 113 | 26 | 6 | 19 | 1 | 97 | 133 |
| Brown | 22 | 1 | 21 | 0 | 2 | 51 | 132 | 26 | 1 | 25 | 0 | 58 | 155 |
Championship: St. Lawrence † indicates conference regular season champion * indicates conference tournament champion (Whitelaw Cup)

1988–89 Hockey East standings
| | Conference | | | | | | | Overall | | | | | |
| | GP | W | L | T | PTS | GF | GA | GP | W | L | T | GF | GA |
|---|---|---|---|---|---|---|---|---|---|---|---|---|---|
| Boston College† | 26 | 16 | 6 | 4 | 36 | 122 | 89 | 40 | 25 | 11 | 4 | 191 | 137 |
| Maine* | 26 | 17 | 9 | 0 | 34 | 127 | 97 | 45 | 31 | 14 | 0 | 221 | 158 |
| Northeastern | 26 | 13 | 11 | 2 | 28 | 126 | 120 | 36 | 18 | 16 | 2 | 166 | 155 |
| Providence | 26 | 13 | 11 | 2 | 28 | 106 | 112 | 42 | 22 | 18 | 2 | 166 | 167 |
| Boston University | 26 | 10 | 15 | 1 | 21 | 114 | 116 | 36 | 14 | 21 | 1 | 157 | 169 |
| New Hampshire | 26 | 9 | 17 | 0 | 18 | 75 | 120 | 34 | 12 | 22 | 0 | 111 | 154 |
| Lowell | 26 | 4 | 21 | 1 | 9 | 82 | 156 | 34 | 8 | 24 | 2 | 122 | 189 |
Championship: Maine † indicates conference regular season champion * indicates conference tournament champion

1988–89 NCAA Division I Independent ice hockey standings
| | Conference | | | | | | | Overall | | | | | |
| | GP | W | L | T | PTS | GF | GA | GP | W | L | T | GF | GA |
|---|---|---|---|---|---|---|---|---|---|---|---|---|---|
| Air Force | 0 | 0 | 0 | 0 | - | - | - | 29 | 14 | 12 | 3 | 150 | 128 |
| Alabama–Huntsville | 0 | 0 | 0 | 0 | - | - | - | 26 | 15 | 10 | 1 | 122 | 95 |
| Alaska–Anchorage | 0 | 0 | 0 | 0 | - | - | - | 34 | 18 | 13 | 3 | 195 | 141 |
| Alaska–Fairbanks | 0 | 0 | 0 | 0 | - | - | - | 38 | 23 | 12 | 3 | - | - |
| St. Cloud State | 0 | 0 | 0 | 0 | - | - | - | 37 | 19 | 16 | 2 | 158 | 141 |
†Kent State cancelled their season due to a hazing incident

1988–89 Western Collegiate Hockey Association standings
| | Conference | | | | | | | Overall | | | | | |
| | GP | W | L | T | PTS | GF | GA | GP | W | L | T | GF | GA |
|---|---|---|---|---|---|---|---|---|---|---|---|---|---|
| Minnesota† | 35 | 27 | 6 | 2 | 56 | 157 | 91 | 48 | 34 | 11 | 3 | 209 | 134 |
| Northern Michigan* | 35 | 20 | 13 | 2 | 42 | 163 | 110 | 45 | 26 | 17 | 2 | 212 | 144 |
| Wisconsin | 35 | 17 | 13 | 5 | 39 | 126 | 108 | 46 | 25 | 16 | 5 | 168 | 134 |
| North Dakota | 35 | 19 | 15 | 1 | 39 | 131 | 119 | 41 | 22 | 18 | 1 | 164 | 138 |
| Denver | 35 | 16 | 17 | 2 | 34 | 143 | 144 | 43 | 22 | 19 | 2 | 179 | 178 |
| Michigan Tech | 35 | 15 | 19 | 1 | 31 | 128 | 150 | 42 | 15 | 25 | 2 | 142 | 188 |
| Minnesota-Duluth | 35 | 12 | 21 | 2 | 26 | 106 | 135 | 40 | 15 | 23 | 2 | 126 | 153 |
| Colorado College | 35 | 9 | 23 | 3 | 21 | 115 | 157 | 40 | 11 | 26 | 3 | 133 | 179 |
Championship: Northern Michigan † indicates conference regular season champion * indicates conference tournament champion

=== Final regular season polls ===
The final top 10 teams as ranked by coaches (WMPL) before the conference tournament finals.

The final media poll (CHSB/WDOM) was released after the conference tournament finals.

WMPL Coaches Poll
| Ranking | Team |
|---|---|
| 1 | Michigan State (7) |
| 2 | Minnesota (3) |
| 3 | Harvard |
| 4 | Boston College |
| 5 | Northern Michigan |
| 6 | St. Lawrence |
| 7 | Lake Superior State |
| 8 | Maine |
| 9 | Colgate |
| 10 | North Dakota |

CHSB / WMEB Media Poll
| Ranking | Team |
|---|---|
| 1 | Minnesota (6) |
| 2 | Harvard (3) |
| 3 | Michigan State |
| 4 | Boston College |
| 5 | Lake Superior State |
| 6 | Maine |
| (tie) | Northern Michigan |
| 8 | St. Lawrence |
| 9 | Illinois Chicago |
| 10 | Wisconsin |
| 11 | North Dakota |
| 12 | Michigan |
| 13 | Bowling Green |
| 14 | Colgate |
| 15 | Providence |

== 1989 NCAA Tournament ==
First Round; March 17–19
W4 | Northern Michigan | 9 | 2 | 0
E5 | Providence | 5 | 4 | 2
E3 | St. Lawrence | 1 | 2 | –
W6 | Wisconsin | 3 | 4 | –
E4 | Boston College | 8 | 4 | –
W5 | Bowling Green | 5 | 2 | –
W3 | Lake Superior State | 6 | 4 | –
E6 | St. Cloud State | 3 | 2 | –

Quarterfinals; March 24–26
E1 | Maine | 6 | 3 | 4**
E5 | Providence | 8 | 2 | 3
W2 | Minnesota | 4 | 4 | –
W6 | Wisconsin | 2 | 2 | –
W1 | Michigan State | 3 | 7 | 5*
E4 | Boston College | 6 | 2 | 4
E2 | Harvard | 4 | 5 | –
W3 | Lake Superior State | 2 | 2 | –

Frozen Four; March 30–31
E1 | Maine | 4
W2 | Minnesota | 7
W1 | Michigan State | 3
E2 | Harvard | 6

National Championship; April 1
W2 | Minnesota | 3
E2 | Harvard | 4*
Third Place Game
E1 | Maine | 4
W1 | Michigan State | 7

Note: * denotes overtime period(s)

== Player stats ==
=== Scoring leaders ===
The following players led the league in points at the conclusion of the season.

GP = Games played; G = Goals; A = Assists; Pts = Points; PIM = Penalty minutes

| Player | Class | Team | GP | G | A | Pts | PIM |
|---|---|---|---|---|---|---|---|
| Bobby Reynolds | Senior | Michigan State | 47 | 36 | 41 | 77 | 78 |
| Kip Miller | Junior | Michigan State | 47 | 32 | 45 | 77 | 94 |
| Greg Parks | Senior | Bowling Green | 47 | 32 | 42 | 74 | 96 |
| Tim Sweeney | Senior | Boston College | 39 | 29 | 44 | 73 | 26 |
| Nelson Emerson | Junior | Bowling Green | 44 | 22 | 46 | 68 | 46 |
| Dave Capuano | Junior | Maine | 41 | 37 | 30 | 67 | 38 |
| Anthony Palumbo | Senior | Lake Superior State | 46 | 22 | 44 | 66 | 38 |
| Paul Polillo | Junior | Western Michigan | 41 | 20 | 46 | 66 | 32 |
| Phil Berger | Senior | Northern Michigan | 44 | 30 | 33 | 63 | 24 |
| Peter Ciavaglia | Sophomore | Harvard | 34 | 15 | 48 | 63 | 36 |

=== Leading goaltenders ===
The following goaltenders led the league in goals against average at the end of the regular season while playing at least 33% of their team's total minutes.

GP = Games played; Min = Minutes played; W = Wins; L = Losses; OT = Overtime/shootout losses; GA = Goals against; SO = Shutouts; SV% = Save percentage; GAA = Goals against average

| Player | Class | Team | GP | Min | W | L | OT | GA | SO | SV% | GAA |
|---|---|---|---|---|---|---|---|---|---|---|---|
| Les Kuntar | Sophomore | St. Lawrence | 14 | 786 | 11 | 2 | 0 | 31 | 0 | .928 | 2.37 |
| Robb Stauber | Junior | Minnesota | 34 | 2024 | 26 | 8 | 0 | 82 | 0 | .911 | 2.43 |
| Allain Roy | Freshman | Harvard | 16 | - | - | - | - | - | - | .912 | 2.46 |
| Curtis Joseph | Freshman | Wisconsin | 38 | 2267 | 21 | 11 | 5 | 94 | 1 | .919 | 2.49 |
| Bruce Hoffort | Sophomore | Lake Superior State | 44 | 2595 | 27 | 10 | 5 | 117 | 0 | .894 | 2.71 |
| Paul Cohen | Senior | St. Lawrence | 25 | 1304 | 18 | 5 | 0 | 60 | 1 | .909 | 2.76 |
| Chuckie Hughes | Freshman | Harvard | 17 | - | 15 | 1 | 0 | - | - | .906 | 2.79 |
| Jason Muzzatti | Sophomore | Michigan State | 42 | 2515 | 32 | 9 | 1 | 127 | 0 | .876 | 3.03 |
| Jeff Carlson | Senior | Alaska-Anchorage | - | - | - | - | - | - | - | - | 3.03 |
| Matt DelGuidice | Sophomore | Maine | 20 | 1090 | 16 | 4 | 0 | 57 | 1 | - | 3.14 |

== Awards ==
=== NCAA ===
| Award | | Recipient |
|---|---|---|
| Hobey Baker Memorial Award | | Lane MacDonald, Harvard |
| Spencer Penrose Award | | Joe Marsh, St. Lawrence |
| Most Outstanding Player in NCAA Tournament | | Ted Donato, Harvard |
AHCA All-American Teams
| East First Team | Position | West First Team |
| Mike O'Neill, Yale | G | Bruce Hoffort, Lake Superior State |
| Greg Brown, Boston College | D | Kord Cernich, Lake Superior State |
| Mike Hurlbut, St. Lawrence | D | Myles O'Connor, Michigan |
| Dave Capuano, Maine | F | Kip Miller, Michigan State |
| Lane MacDonald, Harvard | F | Greg Parks, Bowling Green |
| Kyle McDonough, Vermont | F | Bobby Reynolds, Michigan State |
| East Second Team | Position | West Second Team |
| David Littman, Boston College | G | Curtis Joseph, Wisconsin |
| Bob Beers, Maine | D | Darryl Olsen, Northern Michigan |
| Dave Williams, Dartmouth | D | Todd Richards, Minnesota |
| Rick Bennett, Providence | F | Sheldon Gorski, Illinois-Chicago |
| Tim Sweeney, Boston College | F | Daryn McBride, Denver |
| C. J. Young, Harvard | F | Dave Snuggerud, Minnesota |

=== CCHA ===
| Awards | | Recipient |
|---|---|---|
| Player of the Year | | Bruce Hoffort, Lake Superior State |
| Rookie of the Year | | Rod Brind'Amour, Michigan State |
| Coach of the Year | | Ron Mason, Michigan State |
| Most Valuable Player in Tournament | | Jason Muzzatti, Michigan State |
All-CCHA Teams
| First Team | Position | Second Team |
| Bruce Hoffort, Lake Superior State | G | Dave DePinto, Illinois-Chicago |
| Kord Cernich, Lake Superior State | D | Rob Blake, Bowling Green |
| Myles O'Connor, Michigan | D | Chris Luongo, Michigan State |
| Greg Parks, Bowling Green | F | Bobby Reynolds, Michigan State |
| Sheldon Gorski, Illinois-Chicago | F | Nelson Emerson, Bowling Green |
| Kip Miller, Michigan State | F | Todd Brost, Michigan |
| Rookie Team | Position | |
| | G | |
| Jason Woolley, Michigan State | D | |
| | D | |
| Rod Brind'Amour, Michigan State | F | |
| Denny Felsner, Michigan | F | |
| Craig Fisher, Miami | F | |
| Ken House, Miami | F | |
| Peter White, Michigan State | F | |

=== ECAC ===
| Award | | Recipient |
|---|---|---|
| Player of the Year | | Lane MacDonald, Harvard |
| Rookie of the Year | | Andre Faust, Princeton |
| Coach of the Year | | Joe Marsh, St. Lawrence |
| Most Outstanding Player in Tournament | | Doug Murray, St. Lawrence |
All-ECAC Hockey Teams
| First Team | Position | Second Team |
| Mike O'Neill, Yale | G | Paul Cohen, Colgate |
| Dave Williams, Dartmouth | D | Dave Baseggio, Yale |
| Mike Hurlbut, St. Lawrence | D | Mike Bishop, St. Lawrence |
| Scott Young, Colgate | D | |
| Lane MacDonald, Harvard | F | C. J. Young, Harvard |
| Kyle McDonough, Vermont | F | Allen Bourbeau, Harvard |
| Jarmo Kekäläinen, Clarkson | F | Peter Ciavaglia, Harvard |
| Rookie Team | Position | |
| Chuckie Hughes, Harvard | G | |
| Allain Roy, Harvard | G | |
| Mike McKee, Princeton | D | |
| Dan Ratushny, Cornell | D | |
| Shawn Rivers, St. Lawrence | D | |
| Dale Band, Colgate | F | |
| Jeff Blaeser, Yale | F | |
| Jamie Cooke, Colgate | F | |
| Andre Faust, Princeton | F | |
| Craig Ferguson, Yale | F | |
| Jim Larkin, Vermont | F | |

=== Hockey East ===
| Award | | Recipient |
|---|---|---|
| Player of the Year | | Greg Brown, Boston College |
| Rookie of the Year | | Rob Gaudreau, Providence |
| | | Scott Pellerin, Maine |
| Coach of the Year Award | | Fern Flaman, Northeastern |
| William Flynn Tournament Most Valuable Player | | Bob Beers, Maine |
All-Hockey East Teams
| First Team | Position | Second Team |
| David Littman, Boston College | G | Scott King, Maine |
| Greg Brown, Boston College | D | Bob Beers, Maine |
| Jim Hughes, Providence | D | Rob Cowie, Northeastern |
| Dave Capuano, Maine | F | David Emma, Boston College |
| Tim Sweeney, Boston College | F | Mike Kelfer, Boston University |
| Dave Buda, Northeastern | F | Harry Mews, Northeastern |
| Rookie Team | Position | |
| Mark Richards, Lowell | G | |
| Keith Carney, Maine | D | |
| Shaun Kane, Providence | D | |
| Rob Gaudreau, Providence | F | |
| Steve Heinze, Boston College | F | |
| Scott Pellerin, Maine | F | |

=== WCHA ===
| Award | | Recipient |
|---|---|---|
| Most Valuable Player | | Curtis Joseph, Wisconsin |
| Freshman of the Year | | Curtis Joseph, Wisconsin |
| Goaltender of the Year | | Robb Stauber, Minnesota |
| Student-Athlete of the Year | | Tim Budy, Colorado College |
| Coach of the Year | | Rick Comley, Northern Michigan |
| Most Valuable Player in Tournament | | Bill Pye, Northern Michigan |
All-WCHA Teams
| First Team | Position | Second Team |
| Curtis Joseph, Wisconsin | G | Robb Stauber, Minnesota |
| Paul Stanton, Wisconsin | D | Todd Richards, Minnesota |
| Darryl Olsen, Northern Michigan | D | Russ Parent, North Dakota |
| Daryn McBride, Denver | F | Dave Snuggerud, Minnesota |
| Shawn Harrison, Michigan Tech | F | John Byce, Wisconsin |
| Tom Chorske, Minnesota | F | Phil Berger, Northern Michigan |

== 1989 NHL entry draft ==
| Round | Pick | Player | College | Conference | NHL team |
|---|---|---|---|---|---|
| 1 | 5 | Bill Guerin ^{†} | Boston College | Hockey East | New Jersey Devils |
| 1 | 7 | Doug Zmolek ^{†} | Minnesota | WCHA | Minnesota North Stars |
| 1 | 8 | Jason Herter | North Dakota | WCHA | Vancouver Canucks |
| 2 | 24 | Kent Manderville ^{†} | Cornell | ECAC Hockey | Calgary Flames |
| 2 | 25 | Dan Ratushny | Cornell | ECAC Hockey | Winnipeg Jets |
| 2 | 29 | Rob Woodward ^{†} | Michigan State | CCHA | Vancouver Canucks |
| 2 | 33 | Greg Johnson ^{†} | North Dakota | WCHA | Philadelphia Flyers |
| 2 | 42 | Ted Drury ^{†} | Harvard | ECAC Hockey | Calgary Flames |
| 3 | 44 | Jason Zent ^{†} | Wisconsin | WCHA | New York Islanders |
| 3 | 47 | Scott Pellerin | Maine | Hockey East | New Jersey Devils |
| 3 | 48 | Bob Kellogg ^{†} | Northeastern | Hockey East | Chicago Blackhawks |
| 3 | 55 | Denny Felsner | Michigan | CCHA | St. Louis Blues |
| 3 | 56 | Scott Thomas ^{†} | Clarkson | ECAC Hockey | Buffalo Sabres |
| 3 | 58 | John Brill ^{†} | Minnesota | WCHA | Pittsburgh Penguins |
| 3 | 59 | Joe Crowley ^{†} | Boston College | Hockey East | Edmonton Oilers |
| 3 | 61 | Jason Woolley | Michigan State | CCHA | Washington Capitals |
| 4 | 64 | Mark Brownschidle | Boston University | Hockey East | Winnipeg Jets |
| 4 | 66 | Matt Martin ^{†} | Maine | Hockey East | Toronto Maple Leafs |
| 4 | 67 | Jim Cummins | Michigan State | CCHA | New York Rangers |
| 4 | 69 | Allain Roy | Harvard | ECAC Hockey | Winnipeg Jets |
| 4 | 71 | Brett Hauer ^{†} | Minnesota–Duluth | WCHA | Vancouver Canucks |
| 4 | 77 | Doug MacDonald | Wisconsin | WCHA | Buffalo Sabres |
| 4 | 82 | Trent Klatt ^{†} | Minnesota | WCHA | Washington Capitals |
| 4 | 84 | Ryan O'Leary ^{†} | Denver | WCHA | Calgary Flames |
| 5 | 85 | Kevin Kaiser | Minnesota–Duluth | WCHA | Quebec Nordiques |
| 5 | 86 | Jace Reed ^{†} | North Dakota | WCHA | New York Islanders |
| 5 | 88 | Aaron Miller ^{†} | Vermont | ECAC Hockey | New York Rangers |
| 5 | 89 | Mike Heinke ^{†} | Providence | Hockey East | New Jersey Devils |
| 5 | 91 | Bryan Shoen ^{†} | Denver | WCHA | Minnesota North Stars |
| 5 | 92 | Peter White | Michigan State | CCHA | Edmonton Oilers |
| 5 | 93 | Daniel Laperrière | St. Lawrence | ECAC Hockey | St. Louis Blues |
| 5 | 96 | Keith Carney ^{†} | Lowell | Hockey East | Toronto Maple Leafs |
| 5 | 97 | Rhys Hollyman | Miami | CCHA | Minnesota North Stars |
| 5 | 99 | Kevin O'Sullivan ^{†} | Boston University | Hockey East | New York Islanders |
| 5 | 100 | Tom Nevers ^{†} | Minnesota | WCHA | Pittsburgh Penguins |
| 5 | 103 | Tom Newman ^{†} | Minnesota | WCHA | Los Angeles Kings |
| 5 | 104 | Marc Deschamps | Cornell | ECAC Hockey | Montreal Canadiens |
| 5 | 105 | Toby Kearny ^{†} | Vermont | ECAC Hockey | Calgary Flames |
| 6 | 107 | Bill Pye | Northern Michigan | WCHA | Buffalo Sabres |
| 6 | 108 | Dave Burke | Cornell | ECAC Hockey | Toronto Maple Leafs |
| 6 | 109 | Dan Bylsma | Bowling Green | CCHA | Winnipeg Jets |
| 6 | 110 | David Emma | Boston College | Hockey East | New Jersey Devils |
| 6 | 112 | Scott Cashman ^{†} | Boston University | Hockey East | Minnesota North Stars |
| 6 | 114 | David Roberts ^{†} | Michigan | CCHA | St. Louis Blues |
| 6 | 116 | Dallas Drake | Northern Michigan | WCHA | Detroit Red Wings |
| 6 | 118 | Joby Messier | Michigan State | CCHA | New York Rangers |
| 6 | 119 | Mike Barkley | Maine | Hockey East | Buffalo Sabres |
| 6 | 121 | Mike Markovich | Denver | WCHA | Pittsburgh Penguins |
| 6 | 122 | Stephen Foster ^{†} | Boston University | Hockey East | Edmonton Oilers |
| 6 | 124 | Derek Frenette | Ferris State | CCHA | St. Louis Blues |
| 6 | 125 | Mike Doers ^{†} | Vermont | ECAC Hockey | Toronto Maple Leafs |
| 7 | 128 | Jon Larson ^{†} | North Dakota | WCHA | New York Islanders |
| 7 | 129 | Keith Merkler ^{†} | Princeton | ECAC Hockey | Toronto Maple Leafs |
| 7 | 131 | Doug Evans | Michigan | CCHA | Winnipeg Jets |
| 7 | 133 | Brett Harkins ^{†} | Bowling Green | CCHA | New York Islanders |
| 7 | 135 | Jeff Batters | Alaska–Anchorage | Independent | St. Louis Blues |
| 7 | 137 | Scott Zygulski ^{†} | Boston College | Hockey East | Detroit Red Wings |
| 7 | 138 | Jack Callahan ^{†} | Boston College | Hockey East | Philadelphia Flyers |
| 7 | 140 | Davis Payne | Michigan Tech | WCHA | Edmonton Oilers |
| 7 | 142 | Pat Schafhauser ^{†} | Boston College | Hockey East | Pittsburgh Penguins |
| 7 | 144 | Ted Kramer | Michigan | CCHA | Detroit Red Wings |
| 7 | 146 | Craig Ferguson | Yale | ECAC Hockey | Montreal Canadiens |
| 7 | 147 | Alex Nikolic | Cornell | ECAC Hockey | Calgary Flames |
| 8 | 148 | Paul Krake | Alaska–Anchorage | Independent | Quebec Nordiques |
| 8 | 151 | Jim Solly | Bowling Green | CCHA | Winnipeg Jets |
| 8 | 154 | Jon Pratt ^{†} | Boston University | Hockey East | Minnesota North Stars |
| 8 | 158 | Andy Suhy | Western Michigan | CCHA | Detroit Red Wings |
| 8 | 159 | Sverre Sears ^{†} | Princeton | ECAC Hockey | Philadelphia Flyers |
| 8 | 161 | Derek Plante ^{†} | Minnesota–Duluth | WCHA | Buffalo Sabres |
| 8 | 162 | Darcy Martini | Michigan Tech | WCHA | Edmonton Oilers |
| 9 | 170 | Matt Robbins ^{†} | Lowell | Hockey East | New York Islanders |
| 9 | 171 | Jeff St.Laurent ^{†} | New Hampshire | Hockey East | Toronto Maple Leafs |
| 9 | 172 | Stephane Gauvin | Cornell | ECAC Hockey | Winnipeg Jets |
| 9 | 173 | Andre Faust | Princeton | ECAC Hockey | New Jersey Devils |
| 9 | 174 | Jason Greyerbiehl | Colgate | ECAC Hockey | Chicago Blackhawks |
| 9 | 175 | Ken Blum ^{†} | Lake Superior State | CCHA | Minnesota North Stars |
| 9 | 176 | Sandy Moger | Lake Superior State | CCHA | Vancouver Canucks |
| 9 | 177 | John Roderick ^{†} | St. Lawrence | ECAC Hockey | St. Louis Blues |
| 9 | 181 | Mark Bavis ^{†} | Boston University | Hockey East | New York Rangers |
| 9 | 182 | Jim Giacin ^{†} | St. Lawrence | ECAC Hockey | Los Angeles Kings |
| 9 | 185 | James Lavish ^{†} | Yale | ECAC Hockey | Boston Bruins |
| 10 | 192 | Justin Tomberlin ^{†} | Maine | Hockey East | Toronto Maple Leafs |
| 10 | 193 | Joe Larson ^{†} | St. Cloud State | Independent | Winnipeg Jets |
| 10 | 194 | Mark Astley | Lake Superior State | CCHA | Buffalo Sabres |
| 10 | 195 | Matt Saunders | Northeastern | Hockey East | Chicago Blackhawks |
| 10 | 201 | Allen Kummu ^{†} | Rensselaer | ECAC Hockey | Philadelphia Flyers |
| 10 | 205 | Greg Hagen ^{†} | St. Cloud State | Independent | Pittsburgh Penguins |
| 10 | 206 | Geoff Simpson ^{†} | Northern Michigan | WCHA | Boston Bruins |
| 10 | 207 | Jim Hiller ^{†} | Northern Michigan | WCHA | Los Angeles Kings |
| 10 | 209 | Ed Henrich ^{†} | Clarkson | ECAC Hockey | Montreal Canadiens |
| 10 | 210 | Dan Sawyer ^{†} | Notre Dame | ACHA | Calgary Flames |
| 11 | 211 | Byron Witkowski ^{†} | Western Michigan | CCHA | Quebec Nordiques |
| 11 | 214 | Brad Podiak ^{†} | Denver | WCHA | Winnipeg Jets |
| 11 | 216 | Mike Kozak | Clarkson | ECAC Hockey | Chicago Blackhawks |
| 11 | 217 | Tom Pederson | Minnesota | WCHA | Minnesota North Stars |
| 11 | 218 | Hayden O'Rear ^{†} | Alaska–Anchorage | Independent | Vancouver Canucks |
| 11 | 219 | Brian Lukowski ^{†} | Lake Superior State | CCHA | St. Louis Blues |
| 11 | 222 | Matt Brait ^{†} | Kent State | ACHA | Philadelphia Flyers |
| 11 | 224 | Todd Henderson | Alaska–Fairbanks | Independent | Buffalo Sabres |
| 11 | 227 | David Franzosa | Boston College | Hockey East | Boston Bruins |
| 11 | 230 | Justin Duberman | North Dakota | WCHA | Montreal Canadiens |
| 12 | 232 | Noel Rahn | Wisconsin | WCHA | Quebec Nordiques |
| 12 | 242 | Joe Frederick ^{†} | Northern Michigan | WCHA | Detroit Red Wings |
| 12 | 245 | Mike Bavis ^{†} | Boston University | Hockey East | Buffalo Sabres |
| 12 | 249 | Kevin Sneddon | Harvard | ECAC Hockey | Los Angeles Kings |
| 12 | 250 | Ken House | Miami | CCHA | Washington Capitals |

† incoming freshman

== See also ==
- 1988–89 NCAA Division III men's ice hockey season
