= David Williams (ice hockey) =

American ice hockey player

- Born: August 25, 1967 (age 58) Plainfield, New Jersey, U.S.
- Height: 6 ft 2 in (188 cm)
- Weight: 195 lb (88 kg; 13 st 13 lb)
- Position: Defense
- Shot: Right
- Played for: San Jose Sharks; Mighty Ducks of Anaheim
- National team: United States
- NHL draft: 234th overall, 1985; New Jersey Devils
- Playing career: 1990–1998

David Andrew Williams (born August 25, 1967) is an American former ice hockey player who played in the National Hockey League for the San Jose Sharks and the Mighty Ducks of Anaheim. Williams was drafted 234th overall by the New Jersey Devils in the 1985 NHL entry draft and played 173 regular season games in the NHL, scoring a total of 11 goals and 53 assists for 64 points and collecting 157 penalty minutes.

Prior to turning pro, Williams played four seasons at Dartmouth College in ECAC Hockey, serving as team captain at the end of his career there. At Dartmouth, Williams was an All American player. He also played varsity hockey for Choate Rosemary Hall a prep school in Wallingford, Connecticut, and Chatham Township High School in Chatham Township, New Jersey. Williams was the first New Jersey-raised player to play in the NHL. Internationally Williams played for the American national team at two World Championships.

At Choate, Williams was also an All New England baseball player, but chose hockey and did not continue playing baseball.

Williams was elected to the New Jersey High School Ice Hockey Hall of Fame in 2012 for his achievements at all levels of ice hockey.

== Career statistics ==
=== Regular season and playoffs ===
			Regular season					Playoffs
Season	Team	League	GP	G	A	Pts	PIM	GP	G	A	Pts	PIM
1981–82	Chatham Township High School	HS-NJ	23	24	25	49	—	—	—	—	—	—
1982–83	Chatham Township High School	HS-NJ	24	32	16	48	—	—	—	—	—	—
1983–84	Chatham Township High School	HS-NJ	—	—	—	—	—	—	—	—	—	—
1984–85	Choate Rosemary Hall	HS-CT	25	14	20	34	30	—	—	—	—	—
1985–86	Choate Rosemary Hall	HS-CT	—	—	—	—	—	—	—	—	—	—
1986–87	Dartmouth College	ECAC	23	2	19	21	20	—	—	—	—	—
1987–88	Dartmouth College	ECAC	25	8	14	22	30	—	—	—	—	—
1988–89	Dartmouth College	ECAC	25	4	11	15	28	—	—	—	—	—
1989–90	Dartmouth College	ECAC	26	3	12	15	32	—	—	—	—	—
1990–91	Muskegon Lumberjacks	IHL	14	1	2	3	4	—	—	—	—	—
1990–91	Knoxville Cherokees	ECHL	38	12	15	27	40	3	0	0	0	4
1991–92	San Jose Sharks	NHL	56	3	25	28	40	—	—	—	—	—
1991–92	Kansas City Blades	IHL	18	2	3	5	22	—	—	—	—	—
1992–93	San Jose Sharks	NHL	40	1	11	12	49	—	—	—	—	—
1992–93	Kansas City Blades	IHL	31	1	11	12	28	—	—	—	—	—
1993–94	Mighty Ducks of Anaheim	NHL	56	5	15	20	42	—	—	—	—	—
1993–94	San Diego Gulls	IHL	16	1	6	7	17	—	—	—	—	—
1994–95	Mighty Ducks of Anaheim	NHL	21	2	2	4	26	—	—	—	—	—
1994–95	San Diego Gulls	IHL	2	0	1	1	0	5	1	0	1	0
1995–96	Detroit Vipers	IHL	81	5	14	19	81	11	1	3	4	6
1996–97	Worcester IceCats	AHL	72	3	17	20	89	5	1	1	2	0
1997–98	Cincinnati Cyclones	IHL	80	3	15	18	78	8	0	2	2	8
IHL totals			242	13	52	65	230	24	2	5	7	14
NHL totals			173	11	53	64	157	—	—	—	—	—

=== International ===
Year	Team	Event	GP	G	A	Pts	PIM
1991	United States	WC	9	0	2	2	8
1992	United States	WC	6	0	1	1	8
Senior totals			15	0	3	3	16

== Awards and honors ==
Award	Year	Ref.
All-ECAC Hockey First Team	1988–89	
AHCA East Second-Team All-American	1988–89	
