= Darryl Olsen =

Canadian ice hockey player

- Born: October 7, 1966 (age 59) Calgary, Alberta, Canada
- Height: 6 ft 0 in (183 cm)
- Weight: 200 lb (91 kg; 14 st 4 lb)
- Position: Defence
- Shot: Left
- Played for: Calgary Flames; HC Gherdëina; Villacher SV; Nottingham Panthers
- National team: Canada
- NHL draft: 185th overall, 1985; Calgary Flames
- Playing career: 1989–2000

Darryl Marvin Olsen (born October 7, 1966) is a Canadian former professional ice hockey defenceman. He played in one National Hockey League game for the Calgary Flames during the 1991–92 season, on December 14, 1991 against the Detroit Red Wings. The rest of his career, which lasted from 1989 to 2000, was spent in the minor leagues and Europe. His son, Dylan Olsen, was drafted 28th overall by the Chicago Blackhawks during the 2009 NHL entry draft.

== Career statistics ==
=== Regular season and playoffs ===
			Regular season					Playoffs
Season	Team	League	GP	G	A	Pts	PIM	GP	G	A	Pts	PIM
1983–84	St. Albert Saints	AJHL	28	7	12	19	—	—	—	—	—	—
1984–85	St. Albert Saints	AJHL	57	19	48	67	77	—	—	—	—	—
1985–86	Northern Michigan University	WCHA	37	5	20	25	46	—	—	—	—	—
1986–87	Northern Michigan University	WCHA	37	5	20	25	96	—	—	—	—	—
1987–88	Northern Michigan University	WCHA	35	11	20	31	59	—	—	—	—	—
1988–89	Northern Michigan University	WCHA	45	16	26	42	88	—	—	—	—	—
1988–89	Canadian National Team	Intl	3	1	0	1	4	—	—	—	—	—
1989–90	Salt Lake Golden Eagles	IHL	72	16	50	66	90	11	3	6	9	2
1990–91	Salt Lake Golden Eagles	IHL	76	15	40	55	89	4	1	5	6	2
1991–92	Calgary Flames	NHL	1	0	0	0	0	—	—	—	—	—
1991–92	Salt Lake Golden Eagles	IHL	59	7	33	40	80	5	2	1	3	4
1992–93	San Diego Gulls	IHL	21	2	8	10	26	10	1	3	4	30
1992–93	Providence Bruins	AHL	50	7	27	34	38	—	—	—	—	—
1993–94	Salt Lake Golden Eagles	IHL	73	17	32	49	97	—	—	—	—	—
1994–95	HC Gherdëina	ITA	34	7	18	25	47	3	1	0	1	2
1994–95	Houston Aeros	IHL	4	0	1	1	12	—	—	—	—	—
1995–96	Villacher SV	AUT	43	11	43	54	102	—	—	—	—	—
1996–97	Nottingham Panthers	BISL	39	7	21	38	24	8	1	2	3	0
1998–99	Phoenix Mustangs	WCHL	11	0	3	3	12	3	0	0	0	6
1999–00	EC Bad Nauheim	GER-2	19	3	5	8	12	—	—	—	—	—
1999–00	Amarillo Rattlers	WPHL	10	1	1	2	6	—	—	—	—	—
1999–00	Corpus Christi IceRays	WPHL	34	9	23	32	24	7	0	4	4	10
IHL totals			305	57	164	221	394	30	7	15	22	38
NHL totals			1	0	0	0	0	—	—	—	—	—

== Awards and honors ==
Award	Year
All-WCHA First Team	1988–89
AHCA West Second-Team All-American	1988–89
WCHA All-Tournament Team	1989

== See also ==
- List of players who played only one game in the NHL
