= Tim Sweeney (ice hockey) =

American ice hockey player (born 1967)

- Born: April 12, 1967 (age 59) Boston, Massachusetts, U.S.
- Height: 5 ft 11 in (180 cm)
- Weight: 185 lb (84 kg; 13 st 3 lb)
- Position: Left wing
- Shot: Left
- Played for: Calgary Flames; Boston Bruins; Mighty Ducks of Anaheim; New York Rangers
- National team: United States
- NHL draft: 122nd overall, 1985; Calgary Flames
- Playing career: 1989–1999

Timothy Paul Sweeney (born April 12, 1967) is an American former professional ice hockey player who played in the National Hockey League from 1990 to 1998 with the Calgary Flames, Boston Bruins, Mighty Ducks of Anaheim, and New York Rangers. He was born in Boston, but grew up in Weymouth, Massachusetts. Sweeney played for Boston College from 1985–89, and then made his professional debut in 1989, and aside from playing in the NHL played in the minor leagues. Internationally Sweeney played for the American national team at the 1992 Winter Olympics and 1994 World Championship.

== Playing career ==
He was selected 122nd overall in the 1985 NHL entry draft by the Calgary Flames.

After college, Sweeney played for the Salt Lake Golden Eagles of the IHL, and then in the NHL for the Calgary Flames, the Boston Bruins, the Mighty Ducks of Anaheim and the New York Rangers. His last professional season was 1998–99, for the Providence Bruins of the AHL.

In his first year after college, the 1989–90 season, he won the International Hockey League's Ken McKenzie Trophy for Rookie of the Year. Sweeney represented the United States at the 1992 Winter Olympics.

== Post-retirement ==
After retiring from hockey, Sweeney worked as a color commentator for Boston College and Hockey East games.

== Personal life ==
Sweeney is married to Chrissy (Roche) Sweeney. Together they have three children, Lily, Emily, and Timothy Sweeney.

== Career statistics ==
=== Regular season and playoffs ===
			Regular season					Playoffs
Season	Team	League	GP	G	A	Pts	PIM	GP	G	A	Pts	PIM
1983–84	Weymouth High School	HS-MA	23	33	26	59	—	—	—	—	—	—
1984–85	Weymouth High School	HS-MA	22	32	56	88	—	—	—	—	—	—
1985–86	Boston College	HE	32	8	4	12	8	—	—	—	—	—
1986–87	Boston College	HE	38	31	16	49	28	—	—	—	—	—
1987–88	Boston College	HE	18	9	11	20	18	—	—	—	—	—
1988–89	Boston College	HE	39	29	44	73	26	—	—	—	—	—
1989–90	Salt Lake Golden Eagles	IHL	81	46	51	97	32	11	5	4	9	4
1990–91	Calgary Flames	NHL	42	7	9	16	8	—	—	—	—	—
1990–91	Salt Lake Golden Eagles	IHL	31	19	16	35	8	4	3	3	6	0
1991–92	Calgary Flames	NHL	11	1	2	3	4	—	—	—	—	—
1991–92	United States National Team	Intl	21	9	11	20	10	—	—	—	—	—
1992–93	Boston Bruins	NHL	14	1	7	8	6	3	0	0	0	0
1992–93	Providence Bruins	AHL	60	41	55	96	32	3	2	2	4	0
1993–94	Mighty Ducks of Anaheim	NHL	78	16	27	43	49	—	—	—	—	—
1994–95	Mighty Ducks of Anaheim	NHL	13	1	1	2	2	—	—	—	—	—
1994–95	Providence Bruins	AHL	2	2	2	4	0	13	8	17	25	6
1995–96	Boston Bruins	NHL	41	8	8	16	14	1	0	0	0	2
1995–96	Providence Bruins	AHL	34	17	22	39	12	—	—	—	—	—
1996–97	Boston Bruins	NHL	36	10	11	21	14	—	—	—	—	—
1996–97	Providence Bruins	AHL	23	11	22	33	6	—	—	—	—	—
1997–98	New York Rangers	NHL	56	11	18	29	26	—	—	—	—	—
1997–98	Hartford Wolf Pack	AHL	7	2	6	8	8	—	—	—	—	—
1998–99	Providence Bruins	AHL	2	0	0	0	0	—	—	—	—	—
NHL totals			291	55	83	138	123	4	0	0	0	2

=== International ===
Year	Team	Event	GP	G	A	Pts	PIM
1992	United States	OLY	8	3	4	7	6
1994	United States	WC	8	3	2	5	0
Senior totals			16	6	6	12	6

== Awards and honors ==
Award	Year
All-Hockey East First Team	1988–89
AHCA East Second-Team All-American	1988–89
Hockey East All-Tournament Team	1989

Awards and achievements
Preceded by Dave Capuano	Hockey East Scoring Champion; 1988–89	Succeeded by David Emma
