= Curtis Joseph =

Canadian ice hockey player (born 1967)

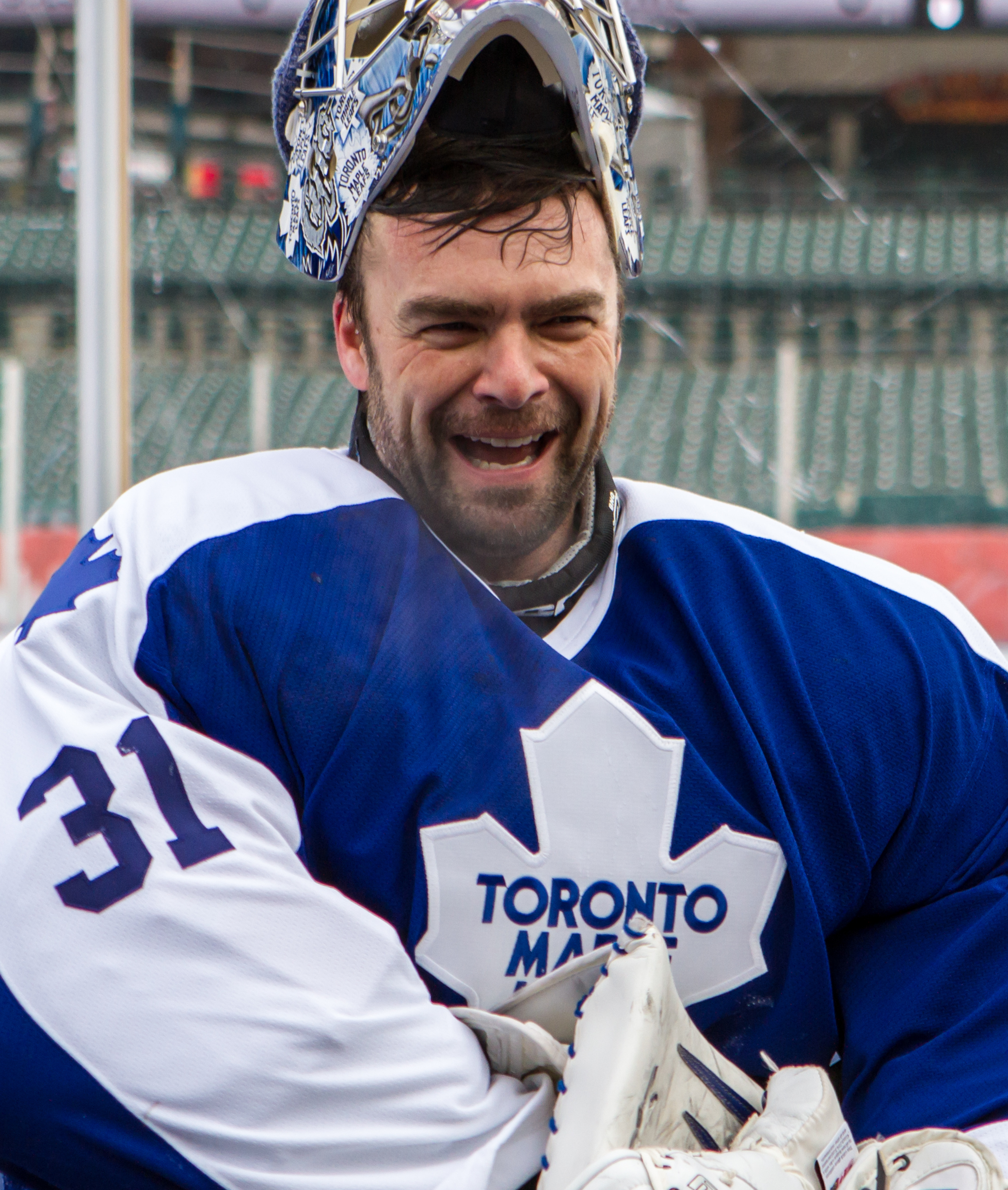
- Joseph in 2013
- Born: April 29, 1967 (age 59) Keswick, Ontario, Canada
- Height: 5 ft 11 in (180 cm)
- Weight: 190 lb (86 kg; 13 st 8 lb)
- Position: Goaltender
- Caught: Left
- Played for: St. Louis Blues; Edmonton Oilers; Toronto Maple Leafs; Detroit Red Wings; Phoenix Coyotes; Calgary Flames
- National team: Canada
- NHL draft: Undrafted
- Playing career: 1989–2009
Medal record
Men's ice hockey
Representing Canada
Olympic Games
Gold medal – first place	2002 Salt Lake City
World Championships
Silver medal – second place	1996 Austria
World Cup of Hockey
Silver medal – second place	1996 Canada
Spengler Cup
Gold medal – first place	2007 Spengler Cup

Curtis Shayne Joseph (né Munro; born April 29, 1967) is a Canadian ice hockey coach and former professional player. Nicknamed "Cujo", Joseph was immediately recognizable on the ice for his masks featuring a snarling dog, drawing inspiration from the Stephen King novel Cujo.

Throughout his National Hockey League (NHL) career, Joseph played for a number of franchises, rising to prominence during the playoffs with the St. Louis Blues, Edmonton Oilers, and Toronto Maple Leafs. He also played for the Detroit Red Wings, Phoenix Coyotes and Calgary Flames. He last played for the Maple Leafs during the 2008–09 NHL season. He was also a member of Canada's gold medal-winning team at the 2002 Winter Olympics.

Joseph retired with the most career wins (454) of any goaltender in NHL history who never played on a Stanley Cup-winning team (which has since been surpassed by Roberto Luongo and Henrik Lundqvist, although they reached the Stanley Cup Finals once, in 2011 and 2014 respectively, where Joseph never did), and was also the first goaltender to have 30 or more wins in a regular season for five different teams. He was also the last goaltender to have played in the NHL in the 1980s.

== Early life ==
Joseph was born on April 29, 1967 to unmarried teenage parents. Soon after his birth, his mother, Wendy Munro, gave him up to be fostered by Jeanne and Howard Eakins. She knew Jeanne from the nursing home where they both worked and thought that the Eakinses could provide a better life for him. He was named Curtis after his birth father, Curtis Nickle. Jeanne later divorced Howard and married Harold Joseph, at which point she cut off contact with Wendy Munro and began using Joseph as Curtis's last name. In the Joseph household, Curtis grew up with two older stepbrothers, Grant and Victor. He also has three older stepsisters and a stepbrother from a previous marriage. The family is of mixed race with Harold and Victor being black, and Grant being adopted before Curtis Joseph. It was not until he signed with the St. Louis Blues that Joseph legally changed his surname from Munro to Joseph.

For the majority of his childhood, Curtis was raised in the East Gwillimbury community of Sharon. He initially attended Whitchurch Highlands Public School and then Huron Heights Secondary School. Curtis grew up playing hockey for the East Gwillimbury Eagles of the OMHA until moving west to play for Notre Dame College in (Wilcox, Saskatchewan). Although he led the Notre Dame Hounds to the Centennial Cup in 1987–88, and he played for the University of Wisconsin–Madison of the NCAA, he was undrafted by the NHL. He signed as a free agent with the Blues on June 16, 1989. In the 1989–90 season, he played 23 games with the Peoria Rivermen in the IHL.

== Playing career ==
Nicknamed "Cujo," Joseph has worn the number 31 for the St. Louis Blues, Edmonton Oilers, Toronto Maple Leafs, Detroit Red Wings, Phoenix Coyotes, and the Calgary Flames. Joseph is a three-time NHL All-Star (1994, 1999, 2000), and he was awarded the 1999–2000 King Clancy Memorial Trophy for exemplifying leadership qualities on and off the ice and making noteworthy humanitarian contributions to his community. In the 2002 Winter Olympics held in Salt Lake City, he was a member of the Olympic Gold Medal winning Canadian men's hockey team.

=== University of Wisconsin ===
Joseph began his college play at the University of Wisconsin. While playing for the Badgers, Joseph won 21 games and was voted to the WCHA All Conference Team. Shortly after his freshman season, Joseph, despite not having been drafted, was signed by the St. Louis Blues to a free-agent entry-level contract on June 16, 1989.

=== NHL career ===
==== St. Louis Blues (1989–1995) ====
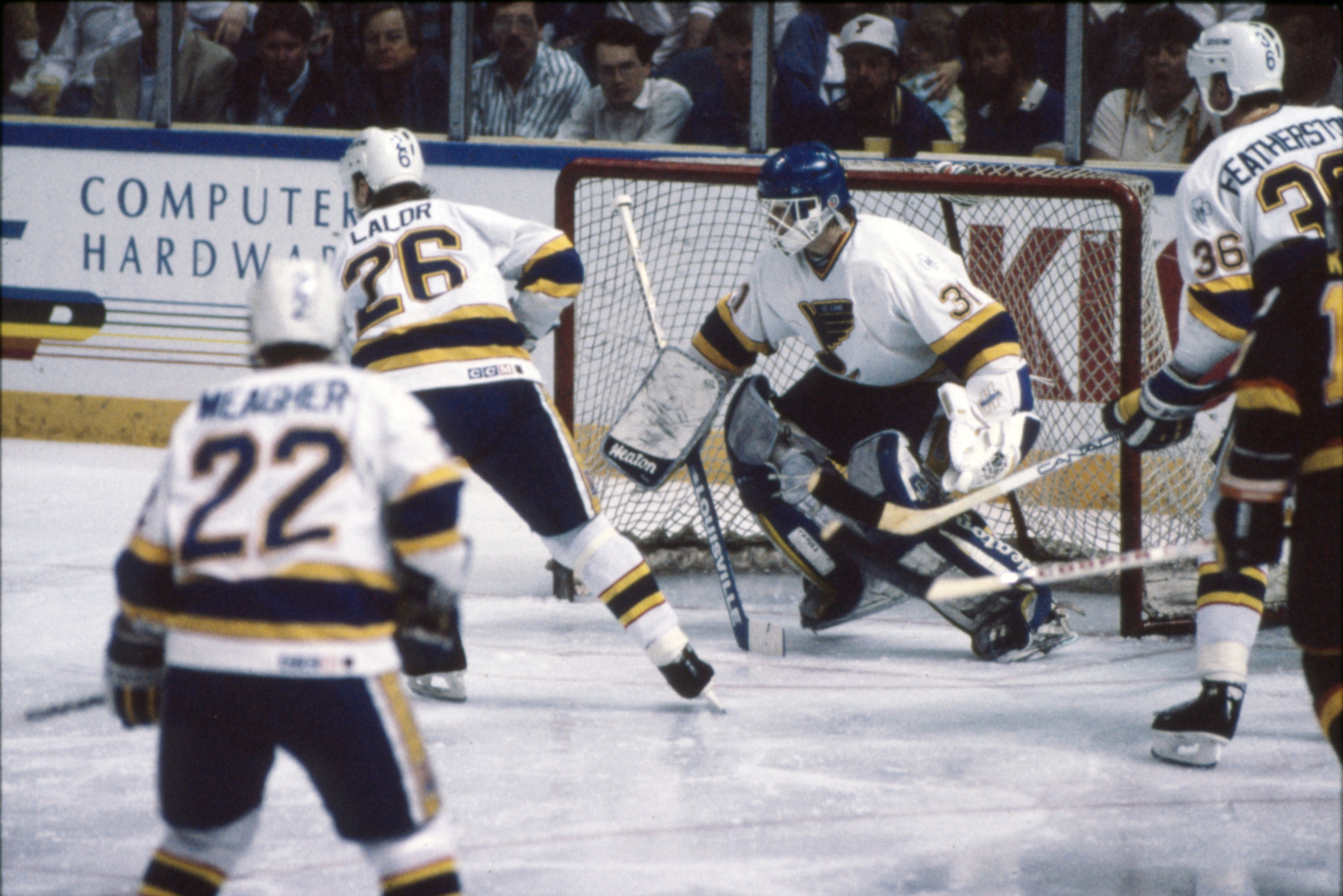
Joseph in net for the St. Louis Blues during his rookie season in 1990

After signing on with the Blues on June 16, 1989, Joseph broke into the NHL in 1990, playing for the St. Louis Blues, and making his first career start against the Edmonton Oilers, on January 2, 1990. In the off-season following the 1990–91 NHL season, the Blues signed Brendan Shanahan from the New Jersey Devils on July 25, 1991. Shanahan was a restricted free agent, and thus the Devils were entitled to compensation. The teams could not agree on what the compensation was; the Blues offered Curtis Joseph, Rod Brind'Amour, and two draft picks, while the Devils wanted Scott Stevens. Joseph seemed to be the answer the Devils were looking for in goal, but the case went to arbitration, and a judge ruled that Stevens was to be awarded to the Devils on September 3, 1991.

Joseph remained with the Blues until 1995. The 1992–93 NHL season was his most successful season, as he played a key role in the upset of the Chicago Blackhawks, the reigning Clarence Campbell Conference regular season champions; the Blues swept them in four games in the first round of the playoffs. The Blues then faced the Toronto Maple Leafs in the second round, and though the Leafs prevailed, the series went to seven games thanks to Joseph's play. Because of his efforts, he was nominated as a finalist for the Vezina Trophy that season, finishing third in voting behind winner Ed Belfour and Tom Barrasso. After a disappointing first-round exit in the 1995 playoffs, St. Louis Blues coach and general manager Mike Keenan signed Grant Fuhr as a free agent on July 14, 1995, and he declined to re-sign Joseph and traded his rights along with the rights to Mike Grier, to the Edmonton Oilers, on August 4, 1995, for two first round draft picks (ultimately becoming Marty Reasoner and Matt Zultek).

==== Edmonton Oilers (1995–1998) ====
The Oilers began their training camp with two starting goaltenders, signed incumbent Bill Ranford and the unsigned Joseph. Edmonton failed to work out a contract or trade Joseph's rights, leaving Joseph without a team to start the 1995–96 season. He signed a contract with the IHL's Las Vegas Thunder and dominated, reminding the NHL that he deserved to be there. The Oilers entertained trading Joseph to the Boston Bruins but would finally sign Joseph to a contract and trade Ranford to Boston on January 11, 1996. With Edmonton, Joseph won two Zane Feldman Trophies (team MVP) and one Most Popular Player award. He backstopped the Oilers to first round playoff upsets of the Dallas Stars and Colorado Avalanche in 1997 and 1998, respectively, their first playoff series wins since 1992.

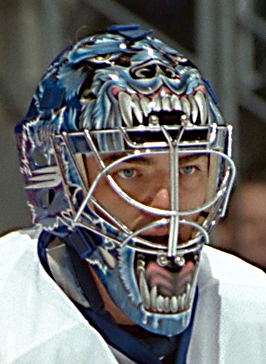
Joseph with the Toronto Maple Leafs in 2001

==== Toronto Maple Leafs (1998–2002) ====
Following the 1997–98 season, Joseph signed as a free agent with the Toronto Maple Leafs on July 15, 1998. While with the Leafs, he had three consecutive seasons of 30+ wins, he was twice runner-up for the Vezina Trophy in 1999 and 2000, a finalist for the Lester B. Pearson Award in 1999, and won the King Clancy Memorial Trophy in 2000. Joseph played a key role in the Leafs' run to the Eastern Conference Finals in 1999 and 2002. In 2000, during Game One of the series against the New Jersey Devils, he was considered the deciding factor in the 2–1 win where the Leafs were outshot 33–21.

After Leafs General Manager Pat Quinn was unwilling to give Joseph a four-year contract (he offered three years), he left after the 2001–02 season to sign with the Detroit Red Wings on July 2, 2002. A few days earlier, the Maple Leafs had traded his rights to the Calgary Flames on June 30, 2002, for a third round draft pick in the 2003 NHL entry draft (which ultimately became Danny Irmen). Some also speculated that the relationship between Quinn and Joseph was frosty because Quinn had benched Joseph in the Salt Lake City Olympics after the first game, although Joseph himself denied the rumours, saying that he played a bad first game against Sweden (losing 5–2) and that Martin Brodeur played very well for the rest of the tournament, earning his spot as the starter. Joseph's move to Detroit was highly publicized and unpopular in Toronto.

==== Detroit Red Wings (2002–2004) ====
In the 2002 offseason, the Detroit Red Wings, who had won the Stanley Cup that year but saw Dominik Hašek announce his retirement on June 25, elected to pursue an experienced goaltender to try and continue their run. On June 30, the Maple Leafs traded his rights to the Calgary Flames for an eighth-round draft pick when they couldn't reach a deal with him. The Flames had his rights for a few hours before he became an unrestricted free agent. Soon afterwards, the Red Wings signed Joseph to a $24 million, three-year contract, with Joseph stating, "Detroit offers a very unique opportunity. Everybody who plays there says the future is now. That was enticing. There's no guarantees that I'll go to Detroit and win a Stanley Cup. But I'd like to take that opportunity."

Joseph initially faltered early in the 2002–03 season but eventually found his form in the latter half of the 2002–03 season to backstop his team to the division title. With an anemic offense, Detroit was upset in the first round of the playoffs in 2003 by the eventual conference champions, the Mighty Ducks of Anaheim in a four-game sweep. Detroit fans and media focused their frustration on Joseph after he was outplayed by the eventual 2003 Conn Smythe Trophy winner Jean-Sébastien Giguère, although the Red Wings scored just six goals in the playoffs after averaging three goals a game in the regular season.

During the 2003 off-season, Hašek announced his intentions to come out of retirement. With fears of Hašek signing with a competitor, Detroit general manager Ken Holland picked up the option on his contract ($8 million) on July 1. Joseph was intended to be traded, but his large contract and subsequent surgery in August to remove bone chips from his ankle made any trade untenable. Detroit was forced to enter the 2003–04 season with two starting goaltenders earning US$8 million per year. After a stint in the minors, Joseph returned to the Red Wings lineup while Hašek was nursing a groin injury. The Red Wings' plan was to keep playing Joseph to showcase him to the rest of the league until Hašek returned to the lineup. In February, Hašek decided to call it quits for the season, which once again solidified Joseph's position on the Red Wings roster.

Detroit finished first overall in the league and entered the first round of the playoffs with Manny Legace as their starting goalie. After great play in the first two games, Legace struggled in games 3 and 4. Joseph took the reins in game 5 and delivered, winning two straight and helping Detroit defeat the Nashville Predators in six games. The Red Wings were defeated in the second round of the playoffs in six games by the eventual Western Conference champions, the Calgary Flames. Joseph was statistically the top goaltender in the 2004 playoffs.

==== Phoenix Coyotes (2005–2007) ====
In the summer of 2005, several teams were interested in signing Joseph, including the Pittsburgh Penguins and Phoenix Coyotes. After taking a call from the new Phoenix coach, Wayne Gretzky, Joseph signed a one-year deal with Phoenix on August 17, 2005. On October 28, 2005, he won his 400th NHL game. On March 28, 2006, he posted his 424th career win, thereby moving into sixth place on the NHL's all-time list, passing Tony Esposito. In the summer of 2006, Joseph returned to Phoenix for another season on a one-year contract. While he was with the Coyotes, Joseph became the first goaltender to have 30 or more regular season wins for five different teams (St. Louis, Edmonton, Toronto, Detroit, and Phoenix); Joseph eventually recorded at least 50 regular season wins with each of those five teams.

==== Calgary Flames (2008) ====
Joseph had shown interest in re-joining the Toronto Maple Leafs, indicating that he would be fine with a back-up role and a reduced salary. In September 2007 the Ottawa Senators quietly expressed interest in acquiring Joseph if they could unload Martin Gerber and his large contract.

On January 14, 2008, Joseph signed a one-year, US$1.5 million contract with the Calgary Flames. On March 1, 2008, Joseph moved past Terry Sawchuk for fourth place in all-time NHL wins with 448 in a 3–1 win over his former team, the Phoenix Coyotes. On April 13, 2008, Joseph replaced Miikka Kiprusoff less than four minutes into the first period of Game #3 of the Flames' first round series of the 2008 playoffs with the San Jose Sharks. Joseph backstopped the Flames to a come-from-behind 4–3 win after initially falling behind 3–0. This win made him the first goaltender to win a post-season game as a member of five different teams: St. Louis, Edmonton, Toronto, Detroit and Calgary.

==== Return to Toronto (2008–2009) ====
On July 1, 2008, Joseph rejoined the Toronto Maple Leafs by signing a 1-year, $700,000 contract. Joseph served primarily as a back-up for most of the season, only playing 21 games. On December 30, 2008, he recorded his 450th career win in a 4–3 overtime victory against the Atlanta Thrashers, and on April 8, 2009, he recorded his 352nd NHL loss, tying Gump Worsley for the NHL record for most losses by a goaltender. Martin Brodeur subsequently set a new record and subsequently finished with 397 losses, Joseph's 352 losses were also later surpassed by Roberto Luongo who subsequently finished with 392 losses.

Joseph announced his retirement on January 12, 2010, in Toronto. His ended his career with 454 regular season wins, fifth most all time. His 63 playoff victories are the most by a goaltender without winning the Stanley Cup.

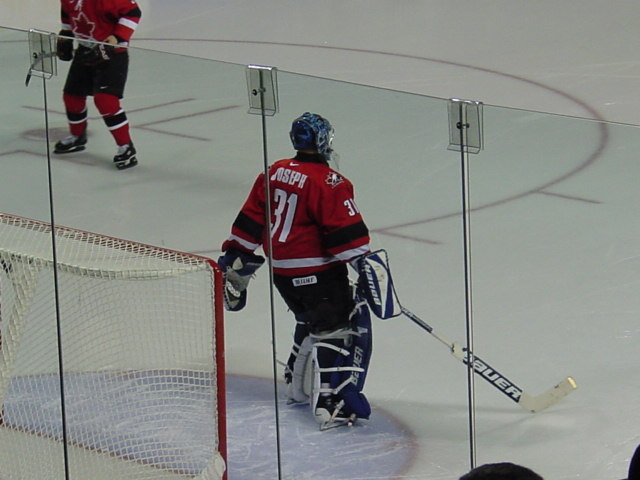
Joseph warming up prior to a game at the 2002 Winter Olympics

During the 2016–17 season, Joseph was a goaltending consultant in the organization of the Carolina Hurricanes.

== International play ==
Joseph was a member of the Canada men's national ice hockey team, having played for the team in several international tournaments, including the 1996 Men's World Ice Hockey Championships, the 1996 World Cup of Hockey, the 2002 Winter Olympics, and the 2007 Spengler Cup. Joseph helped lead the team to the Spengler Cup championship on December 31, 2007.

== Personal life ==
Joseph has been married twice and has seven children, including a nephew he is raising with his second wife. Joseph was previously married to Nancy. The couple had four children together before divorcing in 2009. Joseph married Stephanie Glasson in 2012, with whom he had a daughter in 2014, and also has a step daughter.

His autobiography, Cujo: The Untold Story of My Life On and Off the Ice, was released in 2018.

Joseph was inducted into the St. Louis Blues Hall of Fame in January 2025 along with Jim Roberts and Wayne Babych.

== Career statistics ==
=== Regular season and playoffs ===
			Regular season										Playoffs
Season	Team	League	GP	W	L	T	OTL	MIN	GA	SO	GAA	SV%	GP	W	L	MIN	GA	SO	GAA	SV%
1984–85	King City Dukes	MetJHL	18	—	—	—	—	947	76	—	4.82	—	—	—	—	—	—	—	—	—
1984–85	Newmarket Flyers	OJHL	2	1	1	0	—	120	16	—	8.00	—	—	—	—	—	—	—	—	—
1985–86	Richmond Hill Dynes	OJHL	33	12	18	0	—	1716	156	1	5.45	—	—	—	—	—	—	—	—	—
1986–87	Richmond Hill Dynes	OJHL	30	14	7	6	—	1764	128	1	4.35	—	—	—	—	—	—	—	—	—
1987–88	Notre Dame Hounds	SJHL	36	25	4	7	—	2174	94	1	2.59	.916	—	—	—	—	—	—	—	—
1987–88	Notre Dame Hounds	CC	—	—	—	—	—	—	—	—	—	—	5	4	1	321	17	—	3.17	—
1988–89	University of Wisconsin	WCHA	38	21	11	5	—	2267	94	1	2.49	.919	—	—	—	—	—	—	—	—
1989–90	Peoria Rivermen	IHL	23	10	8	2	—	1241	80	0	3.87	—	—	—	—	—	—	—	—	—
1989–90	St. Louis Blues	NHL	15	9	5	1	—	852	48	0	3.38	.890	6	4	1	327	18	0	3.30	.892
1990–91	St. Louis Blues	NHL	30	16	10	2	—	1710	89	0	3.12	.898	—	—	—	—	—	—	—	—
1991–92	St. Louis Blues	NHL	60	27	20	10	—	3494	175	2	3.01	.910	6	2	4	379	23	0	3.64	.894
1992–93	St. Louis Blues	NHL	68	29	28	9	—	3890	196	1	3.02	.911	11	7	4	715	27	2	2.27	.938
1993–94	St. Louis Blues	NHL	71	36	23	11	—	4127	213	1	3.10	.911	4	0	4	246	15	0	3.66	.905
1994–95	St. Louis Blues	NHL	36	20	10	1	—	1914	89	1	2.79	.902	7	3	3	392	24	0	3.67	.865
1995–96	Las Vegas Thunder	IHL	15	12	2	1	—	873	29	1	1.99	.929	—	—	—	—	—	—	—	—
1995–96	Edmonton Oilers	NHL	34	15	16	2	—	1935	111	0	3.44	.886	—	—	—	—	—	—	—	—
1996–97	Edmonton Oilers	NHL	72	32	29	9	—	4089	200	6	2.93	.907	12	5	7	767	36	2	2.82	.911
1997–98	Edmonton Oilers	NHL	71	29	31	9	—	4132	181	8	2.63	.905	12	5	7	715	23	3	1.93	.928
1998–99	Toronto Maple Leafs	NHL	67	35	24	7	—	4001	171	3	2.56	.910	17	9	8	1011	41	1	2.43	.907
1999–00	Toronto Maple Leafs	NHL	63	36	20	7	—	3801	158	4	2.49	.915	12	6	6	729	25	1	2.06	.932
2000–01	Toronto Maple Leafs	NHL	68	33	27	8	—	4100	163	6	2.39	.915	11	7	4	685	24	3	2.10	.927
2001–02	Toronto Maple Leafs	NHL	51	29	17	5	—	3065	114	4	2.23	.906	20	10	10	1253	48	3	2.30	.934
2002–03	Detroit Red Wings	NHL	61	34	19	6	—	3566	148	5	2.49	.912	4	0	4	289	10	0	2.08	.917
2003–04	Grand Rapids Griffins	AHL	1	1	0	0	—	60	1	0	1.00	.952	—	—	—	—	—	—	—	—
2003–04	Detroit Red Wings	NHL	31	16	10	3	—	1708	68	2	2.39	.909	9	4	4	518	12	1	1.39	.939
2005–06	Phoenix Coyotes	NHL	60	32	21	—	3	3424	166	4	2.91	.902	—	—	—	—	—	—	—	—
2006–07	Phoenix Coyotes	NHL	55	18	31	—	2	2993	159	4	3.19	.893	—	—	—	—	—	—	—	—
2007–08	Calgary Flames	NHL	9	3	2	—	0	399	17	0	2.55	.906	2	1	0	79	1	0	0.76	.970
2008–09	Toronto Maple Leafs	NHL	21	5	9	—	1	383	50	0	3.57	.869	—	—	—	—	—	—	—	—
NHL totals			943	454	352	90	6	54,055	2,516	51	2.79	.906	132	63	66	8,106	327	16	2.45	.917

=== International ===
Year	Team	Event	Results	GP	W	L	T	MIN	GA	SO	GAA	SV%
1996	Canada	WC	2nd place, silver medalist(s)	8	—	—	—	409	12	2	1.94	.916
1996	Canada	WCH	2nd	7	5	2	0	468	18	1	2.31	.908
2002	Canada	OLY	1st place, gold medalist(s)	1	0	1	0	60	5	0	5.00	.800
Senior totals				16	—	—	—	937	35	3	2.24	—

== Awards and honours ==
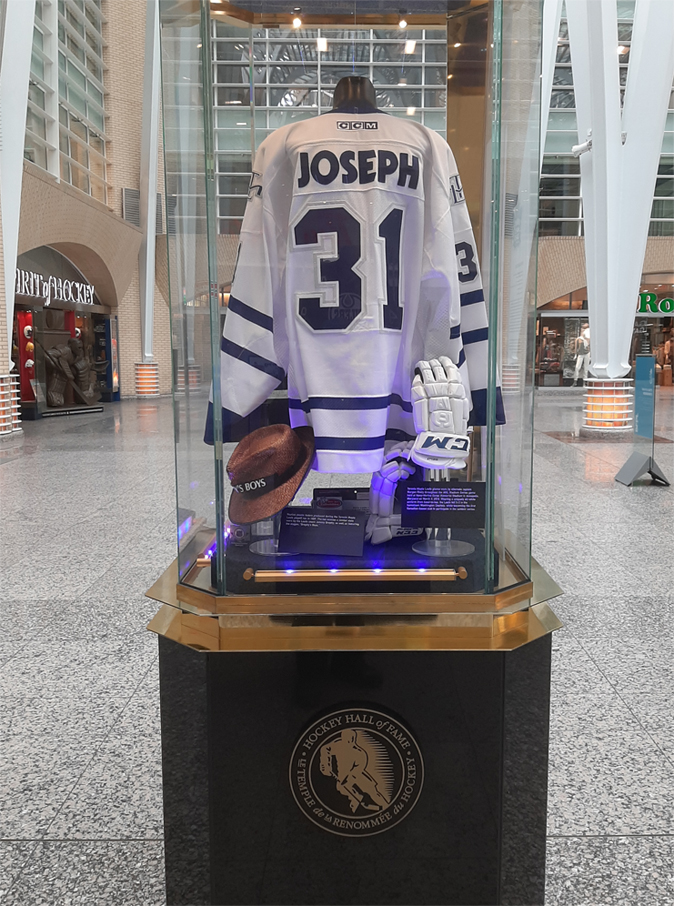
Leafs jersey worn by Joseph during the 3rd Annual Hockey Hall of Fame Game played on November 10, 2001

Award	Year
College
All-WCHA First Team	1988–89
AHCA West Second-Team All-American	1988–89
NHL
NHL All-Star Game	1994, 1999, 2000
King Clancy Memorial Trophy	2000

- Inducted into St. Louis Sports Hall of Fame, 2015
- Inducted into St. Louis Blues Hall of Fame, 2025

== See also ==
- List of NHL goaltenders with 300 wins
- List of National Hockey League statistical leaders

Awards and achievements
Preceded by Rick Berens	WCHA Freshman of the Year; 1988–89	Succeeded by Scott Beattie
Preceded by Robb Stauber	WCHA Most Valuable Player; 1988–89	Succeeded by Gary Shuchuk
Preceded by Rob Ray	Winner of the King Clancy Memorial Trophy; 2000	Succeeded by Shjon Podein
