= 1987–88 Lake Superior State Lakers men's ice hockey season =

Championship collegiate men's ice hockey season

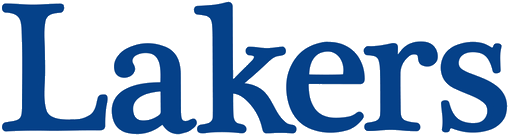

National champion CCHA, champion NCAA tournament, champion
- Conference: 1st CCHA
- Home ice: Norris Center

Record
- Overall: 33–7–6
- Conference: 22–4–6
- Home: 18–3–2
- Road: 11–3–4
- Neutral: 4–1–0

Coaches and captains
- Head coach: Frank Anzalone
- Assistant coaches: Jeff Jackson; Jim Roque
- Captain(s): Terry Hossack; Craig Hewson
- Alternate captain: Anthony Palumbo

The 1987–88 Lake Superior State Lakers men's ice hockey team represented the Lake Superior State University in college ice hockey. In its 6th year under head coach Frank Anzalone the team compiled a 33–7–6 record and reached the NCAA tournament for the second time. The Lakers defeated St. Lawrence 4–3 in overtime to win the championship game at the Olympic Center in Lake Placid, New York.

== Season ==
=== Regular season consistency ===
After Frank Anzalone became head coach during the 1982–83 season, the Lakers began to find success. Because of the team's success Anzalone was able to recruit talented up-and-coming players such as goaltender Bruce Hoffort and New Jersey Devils draft pick Jim Dowd. While these freshmen newcomers, particularly Hoffort, would make major contributions to the team it was the upper classmen who led the way.

Mark Vermette, who scored only a single goal in his freshman season, exploded out of the gate and helped Lake Superior build an early lead in the conference standings. The Lakers never found themselves on any long winning streaks but they rode Vermette's sudden scoring flurry to wins almost every weekend. The Lakers lost only a single game in each of the first three months of the season and ended 1987 with as many ties as losses (3 each).

The second half of the season was no different with the Lakers continuing to build on their lead in the CCHA, losing only one more conference game the rest of the year and finishing with a massive 10-point lead over second-place Bowling Green. The Lakers won only their second CCHA title (the first in 14 years) and were ranked so highly that it was possible for them to make the NCAA tournament bases solely on their regular season. They had achieved such heights with a combination of scoring and tough, physical play they earned them around 1,000 penalty minutes in just 38 games.

=== CCHA tournament ===
Lake Superior ran through 8th-place Ohio State winning the quarterfinal series handily. For the championship rounds the Lakers headed to Detroit to face Western Michigan, who had given them fits during the season. The semifinal saw no difference as the two teams fought to a 4–4 draw in regulation, leading to the fourth overtime game on the season between the two. This time the Lake State was able to emerge as the victor and head to the conference championship game. The final gamed followed a similar pattern to the semifinal with the Lakers and Bowling Green knotted at 2-all after 60 minutes but the Lakers could not get a second consecutive overtime goal and missed a chance to win their first ever conference tournament.

=== NCAA tournament ===
Despite the loss, Lake Superior had won 30 games by that point, a new program record, and were given the #2 western seed, allowing them to bypass the first round of the tournament and await their opponent at home. After a week off, the Lakers played host to Merrimack, a Division III team who had received the final At-Large bid into the tournament. Despite not much being expected of them, the Warriors had taken down the Hockey East champion in the first round then stunned the Lakers in game 1 of the quarterfinals 3–4. Fortunately for lake Superior, at the time the tournament format had the first two rounds being two-game total-goal series and they could get away with a poor effort in one game. Sure enough Lake Superior rebounded with 5–1 win in the second and took the series to advance to their first Frozen Four.

In the national semifinal Lake State faced its toughest challenge yet, the top-ranked Maine Black Bears. It was, however, the Lakers' tenacity that won out in the end. While Mane came in with the top offense in the country, Lake Superior was able to win the majority of puck battles and double up the vaunted easterners 6–3.

For their first championship appearance, Lake Superior faced an equally unlikely opponent in St. Lawrence who had outlasted western powerhouse Minnesota the night after. The two unheralded teams each tried to play their game and it was St. Lawrence who looked to be the better of the two early. With the Lakers getting into penalty trouble the Saints fired 20 shots on goal in the first period but Hoffort stood tall and turned everything aside. St. Lawrence was finally able to solve Hoffort in the second period, pumping three goals into the net in the middle frame.

==== Third-period controversy ====
With the game tied 3–3 late in the third period, St. Lawrence got the puck near the front of the net and had an opportunity to score when future U.S. Congressman Pete Stauber intentionally knocked the net off of its moorings. This violation would normally cause a penalty shot to be called, but referee Frank Cole only called for a face-off. The building, full of St. Lawrence partisans, booed what they felt was an obvious missed call but the Lakers were able to escape unscathed.

The game headed into overtime and wear and tear of playing back-to-back games started to show on St. Lawrence. Lake Superior attacked the Saints' cage and just before the 5-minute mark, Vermette slid a rebound through a maze of bodies into the net and gave Lake Superior its first national title.

=== Awards and honors ===
Bruce Hoffort's 49-saves in the title game helped him earn the tournament MOP and was joined by Kord Cernich and Mike DeCarle on the All-Tournament team. Mark Vermette led the NCAA in goals, setting a program record with 45 on the season and is the only Laker in history to reach the 40-goal plateau (as of 2019). His goal-scoring frenzy made him a finalist for the Hobey Baker Award but that year it would go to Minnesota's Robb Stauber, Pete's brother. Vermette had to settle for being named an AHCA first-team All-American while head coach Frank Anzalone received the Spencer Penrose Award as the national coach of the year. Hoffort's 2.65 goals against average was also the best for qualifying goalies in the nation.

Vermette was named the CCHA Player of the Year, the first Laker to win the award, while Anzalone won the CCHA Coach of the Year. Vermette and Hoffort were named to the All-CCHA First Team while Cernich and DeCarle made the Second Team.

== Standings ==
1987–88 Central Collegiate Hockey Association standings
	Conference							Overall					
	GP	W	L	T	PTS	GF	GA	GP	W	L	T	GF	GA
Lake Superior State†	32	22	4	6	50	163	97	46	33	7	6	233	139
Bowling Green*	32	19	11	2	40	190	144	45	30	13	2	258	188
Michigan State	32	18	11	3	39	151	123	46	27	16	3	222	173
Western Michigan	32	17	12	3	37	152	136	42	22	17	3	208	184
Michigan	32	17	15	0	34	140	131	41	22	19	0	176	171
Illinois-Chicago	32	14	17	1	29	137	138	39	18	20	1	170	169
Ferris State	32	11	17	4	26	118	165	40	15	20	5	155	198
Ohio State	32	7	21	4	18	116	178	40	10	24	6	138	209
Miami	32	7	24	1	15	113	168	38	12	25	1	145	187
Championship: Bowling Green † indicates conference regular season champion * indicates conference tournament champion

== Schedule ==
The team's schedule was a s follows:

Date	Opponent^{#}	Rank^{#}	Site	Result	Attendance	Record
Regular season
October 9	vs. St. Cloud State*		Norris Center • Sault Ste. Marie, Michigan	W 8–4		1–0
October 10	vs. St. Cloud State*		Norris Center • Sault Ste. Marie, Michigan	W 7–3		2–0
October 16	vs. Ohio State		Norris Center • Sault Ste. Marie, Michigan	T 4–4 ^{OT}		2–0–1 (0–0–1)
October 17	vs. Ohio State		Norris Center • Sault Ste. Marie, Michigan	W 9–2		3–0–1 (1–0–1)
October 23	at Bowling Green		BGSU Ice Arena • Bowling Green, Ohio	W 5–4 ^{OT}		4–0–1 (2–0–1)
October 24	at Bowling Green		BGSU Ice Arena • Bowling Green, Ohio	W 7–3		5–0–1 (3–0–1)
October 30	vs. Ferris State		Norris Center • Sault Ste. Marie, Michigan	W 7–5		6–0–1 (4–0–1)
October 31	vs. Ferris State		Norris Center • Sault Ste. Marie, Michigan	L 7–8 ^{OT}		6–1–1 (4–1–1)
November 6	at Miami		Goggin Ice Arena • Oxford, Ohio	W 5–3		7–1–1 (5–1–1)
November 7	at Miami		Goggin Ice Arena • Oxford, Ohio	W 5–1		8–1–1 (6–1–1)
November 13	vs. Western Michigan		Norris Center • Sault Ste. Marie, Michigan	W 3–1		9–1–1 (7–1–1)
November 14	vs. Western Michigan		Norris Center • Sault Ste. Marie, Michigan	L 5–6 ^{OT}		9–2–1 (7–2–1)
November 20	at Illinois–Chicago*		UIC Pavilion • Chicago, Illinois	T 3–3 ^{OT}		9–2–2 (7–2–2)
November 21	at Illinois–Chicago*		UIC Pavilion • Chicago, Illinois	W 5–2		10–2–2 (8–2–2)
November 27	vs. Michigan		Norris Center • Sault Ste. Marie, Michigan	W 5–3		11–2–2 (9–2–2)
November 28	vs. Michigan		Norris Center • Sault Ste. Marie, Michigan	W 6–3		12–2–2 (10–2–2)
December 4	at Michigan State		Munn Ice Arena • East Lansing, Michigan	L 2–4		12–3–2 (10–3–2)
December 5	at Michigan State		Munn Ice Arena • East Lansing, Michigan	T 4–4 ^{OT}		12–3–3 (10–3–3)
December 11	at Ohio State		OSU Ice Rink • Columbus, Ohio	W 7–0		13–3–3 (11–3–3)
December 12	at Ohio State		OSU Ice Rink • Columbus, Ohio	W 5–2		14–3–3 (12–3–3)
December 28	vs. Northern Michigan*		Norris Center • Sault Ste. Marie, Michigan	W 3–2		15–3–3 (12–3–3)
January 3	vs. Michigan Tech*		Brown County Arena • Ashwaubenon, Wisconsin	W 5–2		16–3–3 (12–3–3)
January 8	vs. Bowling Green		Norris Center • Sault Ste. Marie, Michigan	T 6–6 ^{OT}		16–3–4 (12–3–4)
January 9	vs. Bowling Green		Norris Center • Sault Ste. Marie, Michigan	W 5–1		17–3–4 (13–3–4)
January 15	at Ferris State		Ewigleben Arena • Big Rapids, Michigan	W 3–2		18–3–4 (14–3–4)
January 16	at Ferris State		Ewigleben Arena • Big Rapids, Michigan	L 2–4		18–4–4 (14–4–4)
January 22	vs. Miami		Norris Center • Sault Ste. Marie, Michigan	W 10–2 ^{OT}		19–4–4 (15–4–4)
January 23	vs. Miami		Norris Center • Sault Ste. Marie, Michigan	W 6–2		20–4–4 (16–4–4)
January 29	at Western Michigan		Lawson Arena • Kalamazoo, Michigan	T 5–5 ^{OT}		20–4–5 (16–4–5)
January 30	at Western Michigan		Lawson Arena • Kalamazoo, Michigan	T 4–4 ^{OT}		20–4–6 (16–4–6)
February 5	vs. Illinois–Chicago		Norris Center • Sault Ste. Marie, Michigan	W 5–2		21–4–6 (17–4–6)
February 6	vs. Illinois–Chicago		Norris Center • Sault Ste. Marie, Michigan	W 6–2		22–4–6 (18–4–6)
February 12	at Michigan		Yost Ice Arena • Ann Arbor, Michigan	W 3–2		23–4–6 (19–4–6)
February 13	at Michigan		Yost Ice Arena • Ann Arbor, Michigan	W 2–0		24–4–6 (20–4–6)
February 19	vs. Michigan State		Norris Center • Sault Ste. Marie, Michigan	W 7–3		25–4–6 (21–4–6)
February 20	vs. Michigan State		Norris Center • Sault Ste. Marie, Michigan	W 5–4		26–4–6 (22–4–6)
February 26	at St. Cloud State*		St. Cloud Municipal Athletic Complex • St. Cloud, Minnesota	W 3–1		27–4–6 (22–4–6)
February 27	at St. Cloud State*		St. Cloud Municipal Athletic Complex • St. Cloud, Minnesota	L 3–4		27–5–6 (22–4–6)
CCHA tournament
March 4	vs. Ohio State*		Norris Center • Sault Ste. Marie, Michigan (CCHA Quarterfinal game 1)	W 6–2		28–5–6 (22–4–6)
March 5	vs. Ohio State*		Norris Center • Sault Ste. Marie, Michigan (CCHA Quarterfinal game 2)	W 4–1		29–5–6 (22–4–6)
Lake Superior State Won Series 2-0
March 11	vs. Western Michigan*		Joe Louis Arena • Detroit, Michigan (CCHA Semifinal)	W 5–4 ^{OT}		30–5–6 (22–4–6)
March 12	vs. Ohio State*		Joe Louis Arena • Detroit, Michigan (CCHA championship)	L 2–3 ^{OT}		30–6–6 (22–4–6)
NCAA tournament
March 25	vs. Merrimack*		Norris Center • Sault Ste. Marie, Michigan (National Quarterfinal game 1)	L 3–4		30–7–6 (22–4–6)
March 26	vs. Merrimack*		Norris Center • Sault Ste. Marie, Michigan (National Quarterfinal game 2)	W 5–1		31–7–6 (22–4–6)
Lake Superior State Won Series 8-5
March 31	vs. Maine*		Olympic Center • Lake Placid, New York (National Semifinal)	W 6–3		32–7–6 (22–4–6)
April 2	vs. St. Lawrence*		Olympic Center • Lake Placid, New York (National championship)	W 4–3 ^{OT}	7,906	33–7–6 (22–4–6)
*Non-conference game. ^{#}Rankings from USCHO.com Poll. Source:

== Roster and scoring statistics ==
The roster and scoring statistics were as follows:

No.	Name	Year	Position	Hometown	S/P/C	Games	Goals	Assists	Pts	PIM
23	Mark Vermette	Junior	RW	Cochenour, ON	(Ontario)	46	45	30	75	154
14	Mike DeCarle	Junior	RW	Covina, CA	(California)	43	27	39	66	83
21	Pete Stauber	Sophomore	F	Duluth, MN	(Minnesota)	45	25	33	58	103
24	Anthony Palumbo	Junior	C	Sault Ste. Marie, ON	(Ontario)	44	17	34	51	18
9	Jim Dowd	Freshman	C	Brick, NJ	(New Jersey)	45	18	27	45	16
20	Brett Barnett	Freshman	LW	Toronto, ON	(Ontario)	44	16	23	39	124
3	Kord Cernich	Sophomore	D	Ketchikan, AK	(Alaska)	46	16	23	39	78
10	Terry Hossack	Senior	F	Farmington Hills, MI	(Michigan)	46	13	17	30	72
15	Jeff Jablonski	Sophomore	LW	Toledo, OH	(Ohio)	46	13	12	25	54
27	Dean Dyer	Freshman	C	Sherwood Park, AB	(Alberta)	45	6	16	22	38
16	Tim Breslin	Freshman	LW	Downers Grove, IL	(Illinois)	38	6	14	20	18
4	Karl Johnston	Freshman	D	Windsor, ON	(Ontario)	42	7	13	20	38
8	Tim Harris	Freshman	RW	Uxbridge, ON	(Ontario)	43	8	10	18	79
12	Craig Hewson	Senior	RW	Brantford, ON	(Ontario)	45	6	12	18	60
22	Dan Keczmer	Sophomore	D	Mount Clemens, MI	(Michigan)	41	2	15	17	34
5	Rene Chapdelaine	Junior	D	Weyburn, SK	(Saskatchewan)	35	1	9	10	44
18	Doug Laprade	Freshman	RW	Thunder Bay, ON	(Ontario)	37	5	4	9	48
6	Ken Martel	Junior	D	Hacienda Heights, CA	(California)	46	0	3	3	46
30	Bruce Hoffort	Freshman	G	Estevan, SK	(Saskatchewan)	31	0	2	2	2
2	David DiVita	Freshman	D	St. Clair Shores, MI	(Michigan)	26	1	0	1	20
35	Brandon Reed	Sophomore	G	Lansing, MI	(Michigan)	1	0	0	0	0
19	Dominic Niro	Freshman	LW	Sault Ste. Marie, ON	(Ontario)	2	0	0	0	2
26	Brian Corso	Freshman	D	San Diego, CA	(California)	4	0	0	0	2
17	Jeff Napierala	Freshman	RW	Muskegon, MI	(Michigan)	7	0	0	0	0
11	Drew Famulak	Sophomore	RW	Melville, SK	(Saskatchewan)	8	0	0	0	6
1	Mike Greenlay	Freshman	G	Vitória, BRA	(Brazil)	19	0	0	0	2
Total							232	336	568	1141

Note: statistical archives record 1 fewer goal than Lake Superior State scored as a team.

== Goaltending statistics ==
No.	Name	Games	Minutes	Wins	Losses	Ties	Goals against	Saves	Shut outs	SV %	GAA
30	Bruce Hoffort	31	1787	23	4	3	79	790	2	.909	2.65
1	Mike Greenlay	19	1023	10	3	3	57	–	0	-	3.34
35	Brandon Reed	1	–	0	0	0	–	–	0	–	–
Total		46	–	33	7	6	139	–	2	–	–

== 1988 national championship ==
=== (W2) Lake Superior State vs. (E2) St. Lawrence ===
April 2	Lake Superior State	4 – 3	OT	St. Lawrence	Olympic Center

Scoring summary
Period	Team	Goal	Assist(s)	Time	Score
1st	LSSU	Tim Harris			1–0 LSSU
1st	LSSU	Kord Cernich			2–0 LSSU
2nd	SLU	Doug Murray	McColgan and Lappin	21:57	2–1 LSSU
2nd	SLU	Russ Mann			2–2
2nd	LSSU	Kord Cernich			3–0 LSSU
2nd	SLU	Brian McColgan	Baker and Lappin		3–3
3rd	None				
1st Overtime	LSSU	Mark Vermette		64:36	4–3 LSSU

Goaltenders
Team	Name	Saves	Goals against	Time on ice
SLU	Paul Cohen		4	
LSSU	Bruce Hoffort	49	3	

== Players drafted into the NHL ==
=== 1988 NHL entry draft ===
The player selected in the 1988 NHL entry draft were as follows:

= NHL All-Star team	= NHL All-Star	= NHL All-Star and NHL All-Star team	= Did not play in the NHL

Round	Pick	Player	NHL team
4	75	Dean Dyer	Hartford Whalers
6	106	David DiVita	Buffalo Sabres
10	191	Paul Constantin†	Vancouver Canucks
11	217	Doug Laprade	Los Angeles Kings

† incoming freshman

== See also ==
- 1988 NCAA Division I Men's Ice Hockey Tournament
- List of NCAA Division I Men's Ice Hockey Tournament champions
