= Dan Keczmer =

American ice hockey player

- Born: May 25, 1968 (age 57) Mount Clemens, Michigan, U.S.
- Height: 6 ft 1 in (185 cm)
- Weight: 180 lb (82 kg; 12 st 12 lb)
- Position: Defense
- Shot: Left
- Played for: Minnesota North Stars; Hartford Whalers; Calgary Flames; Dallas Stars; Nashville Predators
- National team: United States
- NHL draft: 201st overall, 1986; Minnesota North Stars
- Playing career: 1990–2000

Daniel Leonard Keczmer (born May 25, 1968) is an American former professional ice hockey player who played in the National Hockey League (NHL) for five teams between 1990 and 2000. Internationally he played for the American national team at two World Championships.

== Biography ==
As a youth, he played in the 1981 Quebec International Pee-Wee Hockey Tournament with a minor ice hockey team from Detroit.

Keczmer played four seasons with Lake Superior State University and was a member of the Lake Superior State Lakers 1988 NCAA Championship men's ice hockey team.

He was drafted in the tenth round, 201st overall, by the Minnesota North Stars in the 1986 NHL entry draft. Keczmer made his professional debut with the IHL's Kalamazoo Wings in the 1990–91 season. He also appeared in nine NHL games with the North Stars that same season.

Keczmer was one of many North Stars who joined the San Jose Sharks in the 1991 NHL Dispersal Draft. Before the Sharks' inaugural season began, however, Keczmer was traded to the Hartford Whalers in exchange for Dean Evason. Keczmer would play with the Whalers, Calgary Flames, Dallas Stars, and Nashville Predators before retiring following the 1999–2000 season.

In his NHL career, Keczmer appeared in 235 games. He scored eight goals and added 38 assists. He also appeared in 12 Stanley Cup playoff games, recording one assist.

He now resides in Brentwood, Tennessee with his family.

== Career statistics ==
=== Regular season and playoffs ===
			Regular season					Playoffs
Season	Team	League	GP	G	A	Pts	PIM	GP	G	A	Pts	PIM
1985–86	Little Caesars U18 AAA	U18 AAA	65	6	48	54	116	—	—	—	—	—
1986–87	Lake Superior State University	CCHA	38	3	5	8	26	—	—	—	—	—
1987–88	Lake Superior State University	CCHA	41	2	15	17	34	—	—	—	—	—
1988–89	Lake Superior State University	CCHA	46	3	26	29	70	—	—	—	—	—
1989–90	Lake Superior State University	CCHA	43	13	23	36	48	—	—	—	—	—
1990–91	Minnesota North Stars	NHL	9	0	1	1	6	—	—	—	—	—
1990–91	Kalamazoo Wings	IHL	60	4	20	24	60	9	1	2	3	10
1991–92	Hartford Whalers	NHL	1	0	0	0	0	—	—	—	—	—
1991–92	Springfield Indians	AHL	18	3	4	7	10	4	0	0	0	6
1991–92	United States National Team	Intl	51	3	11	14	56	—	—	—	—	—
1992–93	Hartford Whalers	NHL	23	4	4	8	28	—	—	—	—	—
1992–93	Springfield Indians	AHL	37	1	13	14	38	12	0	4	4	14
1993–94	Hartford Whalers	NHL	12	0	1	1	12	—	—	—	—	—
1993–94	Springfield Indians	AHL	7	0	1	1	4	—	—	—	—	—
1993–94	Calgary Flames	NHL	57	1	20	21	48	3	0	0	0	4
1994–95	Calgary Flames	NHL	28	2	3	5	10	7	0	1	1	2
1995–96	Calgary Flames	NHL	13	0	0	0	14	—	—	—	—	—
1995–96	Saint John Flames	AHL	22	3	11	14	14	—	—	—	—	—
1995–96	Albany River Rats	AHL	17	0	4	4	4	1	0	0	0	0
1996–97	Dallas Stars	NHL	13	0	1	1	6	—	—	—	—	—
1996–97	Michigan K-Wings	IHL	42	3	17	20	24	—	—	—	—	—
1997–98	Michigan K-Wings	IHL	44	1	11	12	29	—	—	—	—	—
1997–98	Dallas Stars	NHL	17	1	2	3	26	2	0	0	0	2
1998–99	Dallas Stars	NHL	22	0	1	1	22	—	—	—	—	—
1998–99	Michigan K-Wings	IHL	5	0	1	1	2	—	—	—	—	—
1998–99	Nashville Predators	NHL	16	0	0	0	12	—	—	—	—	—
1999–00	Nashville Predators	NHL	24	0	5	5	28	—	—	—	—	—
1999–00	Milwaukee Admirals	IHL	18	1	3	4	10	—	—	—	—	—
1999–00	Worcester IceCats	AHL	25	1	9	10	12	9	0	1	1	10
NHL totals			235	8	38	46	212	12	0	1	1	8

=== International ===
Year	Team	Event	GP	G	A	Pts	PIM
1990	United States	WC	10	0	0	0	2
1999	United States	WC	6	2	0	2	6
Senior totals			16	2	0	2	8

== Awards and honors ==
Award	Year
CCHA All-Tournament Team	1989
All-CCHA Second Team	1989–90

Awards and achievements
Preceded by Award Created	CCHA Best Defensive Defenseman; 1989-90	Succeeded by Karl Johnston
