= Rene Chapdelaine =

Canadian ice hockey player (born 1966)

- Born: September 27, 1966 (age 59) Weyburn, Saskatchewan, Canada
- Height: 6 ft 1 in (185 cm)
- Weight: 195 lb (88 kg; 13 st 13 lb)
- Position: Defence
- Shot: Right
- Played for: Los Angeles Kings
- NHL draft: 149th overall, 1986; Los Angeles Kings
- Playing career: 1989–2003

Rene Ronald Chapdelaine (born September 27, 1966) is a Canadian former professional ice hockey defenceman. He was drafted by the Los Angeles Kings in the eighth round, 149th overall, in the 1986 NHL entry draft. He played 32 National Hockey League games with the Kings over three seasons between 1990 and 1993.

He was a member of the Lake Superior State Lakers 1988 NCAA Championship men's ice hockey team.

== Career statistics ==
=== Regular season and playoffs ===
			Regular season					Playoffs
Season	Team	League	GP	G	A	Pts	PIM	GP	G	A	Pts	PIM
1984–85	Weyburn Red Wings	SJHL	61	3	17	20	—	—	—	—	—	—
1985–86	Lake Superior State University	CCHA	32	1	4	5	47	—	—	—	—	—
1986–87	Lake Superior State University	CCHA	28	1	5	6	51	—	—	—	—	—
1987–88	Lake Superior State University	CCHA	35	1	9	10	44	—	—	—	—	—
1988–89	Lake Superior State University	CCHA	46	4	9	13	62	—	—	—	—	—
1989–90	New Haven Nighthawks	AHL	41	0	1	1	35	—	—	—	—	—
1990–91	Los Angeles Kings	NHL	3	0	1	1	10	—	—	—	—	—
1990–91	New Haven Nighthawks	AHL	65	3	11	14	49	—	—	—	—	—
1990–91	Phoenix Roadrunners	IHL	17	0	2	2	10	11	0	0	0	8
1991–92	Los Angeles Kings	NHL	16	0	1	1	10	—	—	—	—	—
1991–92	Phoenix Roadrunners	IHL	62	4	22	26	87	—	—	—	—	—
1991–92	New Haven Nighthawks	AHL	—	—	—	—	—	4	0	2	2	0
1992–93	Los Angeles Kings	NHL	13	0	0	0	12	—	—	—	—	—
1992–93	Phoenix Roadrunners	IHL	44	1	17	18	54	—	—	—	—	—
1992–93	San Diego Gulls	IHL	9	1	1	2	8	14	0	1	1	27
1993–94	Peoria Rivermen	IHL	80	8	9	17	100	6	1	3	4	10
1994–95	Peoria Rivermen	IHL	45	3	2	5	62	9	0	2	2	12
1995–96	Peoria Rivermen	IHL	70	2	10	12	135	12	1	0	1	8
1996–97	San Antonio Dragons	IHL	69	7	11	18	125	9	2	3	5	10
1997–98	San Antonio Dragons	IHL	73	2	11	13	128	—	—	—	—	—
1998–99	Utah Grizzlies	IHL	19	2	2	4	16	—	—	—	—	—
1998–99	Long Beach Ice Dogs	IHL	29	1	1	2	28	8	0	2	2	18
1999–00	Long Beach Ice Dogs	IHL	59	1	6	7	116	6	0	0	0	4
2000–01	Long Beach Ice Dogs	WCHL	55	4	12	16	83	8	2	2	4	10
2001–02	Long Beach Ice Dogs	WCHL	10	1	1	2	10	—	—	—	—	—
2002–03	St. John's Maple Leafs	AHL	6	0	1	1	0	—	—	—	—	—
IHL totals			576	32	94	126	869	75	4	11	15	97
NHL totals			32	0	2	2	32	—	—	—	—	—
