= 1988 NCAA Division I men's ice hockey tournament =

- Teams: 12
- Finals site: Olympic Center, Lake Placid, New York
- Champions: Lake Superior State Lakers (1st title)
- Runner-up: St. Lawrence Saints (2nd title game)
- Semifinalists: Maine Black Bears (1st Frozen Four); Minnesota Golden Gophers (13th Frozen Four)
- Winning coach: Frank Anzalone (1st title)
- MOP: Bruce Hoffort (Lake Superior State)
- Attendance: 27,582

The 1988 NCAA Division I Men's Ice Hockey Tournament was the culmination of the 1987–88 NCAA Division I men's ice hockey season, the 41st such tournament in NCAA history. It was held between March 18 and April 2, 1988, and concluded with Lake Superior State defeating St. Lawrence 4–3 in overtime. All first-round and quarterfinals matchups were held at home team venues with the 'Frozen Four' games being played at the Olympic Center in Lake Placid, New York.

For the first time the NCAA tournament was expanded to 12 teams (four more than the previous seven years) partially as a result of an increasing number of programs as well as two additional conferences being created in the interim.

This was the first tournament to include an independent school since 1960, more than a year before the ECAC was founded.

The championship game is remembered for a missed infraction towards the end of regulation by LSSU player Pete Stauber that should have given St. Lawrence a penalty shot but resulted in no call from the official.

== Qualifying teams ==
The NCAA permitted 12 teams to qualify for the tournament and divided its qualifiers into two regions (East and West). Each of the tournament champions from the four Division I conferences (CCHA, ECAC, Hockey East and WCHA) received automatic invitations into the tournament with At-large bids making up the remaining 8 teams. The NCAA permitted one Independent team to participate in the tournament and placed it in the western bracket with the intention to place an additional independent in the eastern regional in 1989. As a result, the two western conferences (WCHA and CCHA) would split only three open spots as opposed to the East's four open spots.

East							West						
Seed	School	Conference	Record	Berth type	Appearance	Last bid	Seed	School	Conference	Record	Berth type	Appearance	Last bid
1	Maine	Hockey East	31–7–2	At-large bid	2nd	1987	1	Minnesota	WCHA	32–8–0	At-large bid	15th	1987
2	St. Lawrence	ECAC Hockey	27–7–0	Tournament champion	10th	1987	2	Lake Superior State	CCHA	30–6–6	At-large bid	2nd	1985
3	Northeastern	Hockey East	20–12–4	Tournament champion	2nd	1982	3	Wisconsin	WCHA	27–12–2	Tournament champion	9th	1983
4	Harvard	ECAC Hockey	21–9–0	At-large bid	13th	1987	4	Bowling Green	CCHA	28–11–2	Tournament champion	7th	1987
5	Vermont	ECAC Hockey	21–9–3	At-large bid	1st	Never	5	Michigan State	CCHA	25–14–3	At-large bid	10th	1987
6	Lowell	Hockey East	20–15–2	At-large bid	1st	Never	6	Merrimack	Independent	32–4–0	At-large bid	1st	Never

== Format ==
The tournament featured four rounds of play. The three odd-number ranked teams from one region were placed into a bracket with the three even-number ranked teams of the other region. The teams were then seeded according to their ranking with the top two teams in each bracket receiving byes into the quarterfinals. In the first round the third and sixth seeds and the fourth and fifth seeds played two-game aggregate series to determine which school advanced to the Quarterfinals with the winners of the 4 vs. 5 series playing the first seed and the winner of the 3 vs. 6 series playing the second seed. In the Quarterfinals the matches were two-game aggregates once more with the victors advancing to the National Semifinals. Beginning with the Semifinals all series became Single-game eliminations. The winning teams in the semifinals advanced to the National Championship Game.

== Tournament Bracket ==
First round March 18–20
W4	Bowling Green	5	5	10
E5	Vermont	1	1	2
E3	Northeastern	5	3	8
W6	Merrimack	3	7	10
E4	Harvard	5	3	8
W5	Michigan State	6	5	11
W3	Wisconsin	7	4	11
E6	Lowell	1	4	5

Quarterfinals; March 25–27
E1	Maine	5	4	9
W4	Bowling Green	1	3	4
W2	Lake Superior State	3	5	8
W6	Merrimack	4	0	4
W1	Minnesota	4	4	8
W5	Michigan State	2	3	5
E2	St. Lawrence	7	3	10
W3	Wisconsin	0	4	4

Frozen Four; March 31-April 1
E1	Maine	3
W2	Lake Superior State	6
W1	Minnesota	2
E2	St. Lawrence	3

National Championship; April 2
W2	Lake Superior State	4*
E2	St. Lawrence	3
Third-place game
E1	Maine	5
W1	Minnesota	2

Note: * denotes overtime period(s)

=== First round ===
==== (E3) Northeastern vs. (W6) Merrimack ====
March 18	Northeastern	5 – 3	Merrimack	Matthews Arena	Recap
No scoring		First period	00:09 - Mark Ziliotto (unassisted)
(MacDougall, Dowd) Rico Rossi - 01:34		Second period	06:27 - PP - Brad Atol (Keating); 09:38 - Jim Alcott (Atol)
(Averill, Rossi) Dave Buda - 01:15 (Heffernan, Sullivan) Brian Dowd - 02:06 (Heffernan, O'Brien) Brian Sullivan - GW - 06:47 (Sullivan, Heffernan) Dave O'Brien - PP - 19:21		Third period	No scoring
(37 saves / 40 shots) Bruce Racine		Goalie stats	Jim Hrivnak (34 saves / 39 shots)

March 19	Northeastern	3 – 7	Merrimack	Matthews Arena	Recap
(Buda) Brian Dowd - PP - 04:34 (Lodin, Heffernan) Dave O'Brien - PP - 12:13		First period	No scoring
(unassisted) Dave Buda - 00:11		Second period	13:57 - Jim Vesey (Ziliotto, Lebeau); 19:27 - Mark Ziliotto (Jay)
No scoring		Third period	01:24 - Jim Alcott (Pion); 03:23 - GW - Mark Ziliotto (unassisted); 11:00 - Jocko Magadini (Locke); 17:13 - Mark Ziliotto (Lebeau); 19:00 - Richard Pion (Heinze, Boyce)
(38 saves / 45 shots) Bruce Racine		Goalie stats	Jim Hrivnak (23 saves / 26 shots)

Merrimack won series 10–8

==== (E4) Harvard vs. (W5) Michigan State ====
March 18	Harvard	5 – 6	Michigan State	Bright Hockey Center
(Armstrong, Sweeney) Andy Janfanza - PP – 04:43		First period	00:57 – Brian McReynolds (Gibson); 01:26 – Kevin Miller (Marshall, Ki. Miller); 07:54 - PP – Bobby Reynolds (Tilley, Cole); 10:44 - PP – Jeff Harding (Cole, Beadle)
(Hartje, Sweeney) Andy Janfanza - PP – 11:35 (Weisbrod, Murphy) Mike Vukonich – 18:08		Second period	00:40 – Tom Tilley (unassisted)
(Donato, Armstrong) Jerry Pawlowski – 17:23 (unassisted) Peter Ciavaglia – 19:20		Third period	09:56 – GW – Kevin Miller (Luongo, Hamilton)
(9 saves / 13 shots) John Devin (20 saves / 22 shots) Mike Francis		Goalie stats	Jason Muzzatti (28 saves / 33 shots)

March 19	Harvard	3 – 5	Michigan State	Bright Hockey Center
No scoring		First period	03:33 - PP – Danton Cole (Murray, Reynolds); 15:46 – Mike O'Toole (Cole, Reynolds)
(Vukonich, Pawlowski) John Weisbrod – 05:08		Second period	06:03 – Bruce Rendall (Luongo, McReynolds)
(Hartje) Jerry Pawlowski - PP – 09:39 (unassisted) Josh Caplan - SH – 18:18		Third period	00:19 – PP GW – Kevin Miller (Luongo, Hamilton); 19:56 - EN – Mike O'Toole (unassisted)
(14 saves / 18 shots) Mike Francis		Goalie stats	Jason Muzzatti (26 saves / 29 shots)

Michigan State won series 11–8

==== (W3) Wisconsin vs. (E6) Lowell ====
March 19	Wisconsin	7 – 1	Lowell	Dane County Coliseum	Recap
(Tuttle, Stanton) Paul Ranheim - 00:18		First period	10:38 - Tony Lopilato (unassisted)
(Byce, Shuchuk) Chris Tancill - PP GW - 09:16 (unassisted) John Byce - 12:15		Second period	No scoring
(unassisted) John Byce - 01:02 (Tuttle, Semandel) Paul Ranheim - 04:20 (Rohlik, Stanton) Don Granato - 12:10 (unassisted) John Byce - 19:51		Third period	No scoring
(22 saves / 23 shots) Dean Anderson		Goalie stats	David Delfino (27 saves / 34 shots)

March 20	Wisconsin	4 – 4	Lowell	Dane County Coliseum	Recap
No scoring		First period	00:19 - Tony Lopilato (Dohaney, Thomas); 17:42 - PP - Tim Foley (Charron, Dohaney)
(Semandel, Tuttle) Paul Ranheim - 04:17 (Snedden) John Byce - 05:19		Second period	08:41 - Bill Dohaney (Lopilato)
(Scheid, Tancill) John Byce - PP - 09:18 (Ranheim, Byce) Steve Tuttle - EA - 19:52		Third period	17:59 - John Borrell (Dohaney, Thomas)
(29 saves / 33 shots) Dean Anderson		Goalie stats	Ken Stein (40 saves / 44 shots)

Wisconsin won series 11–5

==== (W4) Bowling Green vs. (E5) Vermont ====
March 18	Bowling Green	5 – 1	Vermont	BGSU Ice Arena	Recap
(Meharry, Emerson) Scott Paluch - PP - 04:48 (Gribble, Emerson) Brent Regan - GW - 12:55 (Gribble, Meharry) Joe Quinn - PP - 18:14		First period	17:38 - SH - Kyle McDonough (unassisted)
(Paluch, Arthur) Joe Quinn - 07:45		Second period	No scoring
(Gribble, Barber) Greg Parks - 06:02		Third period	No scoring
(15 saves / 16 shots) Paul Connell		Goalie stats	Mike Millham (26 saves / 31 shots)

March 19	Bowling Green	5 – 1	Vermont	BGSU Ice Arena	Recap
(Paluch, Barber) Greg Parks - 00:43 (Williams, Ruchty) Pierrick Maïa - GW - 02:47		First period	03:25 - Toby Ducolon (McDonough)
(Gribble) Scott Paluch - 05:13		Second period	No scoring
(Paluch, Parks) Marc Potvin - PP - 02:09 (Leggett) Brian Meharry - 13:53		Third period	No scoring
(26 saves / 27 shots) Paul Connell		Goalie stats	Phil Marrandette (20 saves / 25 shots)

Bowling Green won series 10–2

=== Quarterfinals ===
==== (E1) Maine vs. (W4) Bowling Green ====
March 25	Maine	5 – 1	Bowling Green	Alfond Arena	Recap
No scoring		First period	06:12 - PP - Brent Regan (Meharry, Gribble)
(McHugh) Vince Guidotti - 03:22 (Corkum) Dave Wensley - GW - 09:38 (Norris, Wensley) Dave Capuano - PP - 09:38 (D. Capuano, Thyer) Dave Nonis - 17:14		Second period	No scoring
(unassisted) Mario Thyer - 14:37		Third period	No scoring
(26 saves / 27 shots) Scott King		Goalie stats	Paul Connell (30 saves / 35 shots)

March 26	Maine	4 – 3	Bowling Green	Alfond Arena	Recap
(Jenkins, Studnikca) Jim Burke - 06:12		First period	No scoring
(Wensley, Weinrich) Bob Corkum - 14:02		Second period	03:21 - PP - Andy Gribble (Paluch)
(Thyer, Weinrich) Christian Lalonde - PP - 09:17 (D. Capuano, Scremin) Mario Thyer - GW - 14:58		Third period	13:22 - Nelson Emerson (Leggett); 19:38 - Thad Rusiecki (Emerson)
(23 saves / 26 shots) Scott King		Goalie stats	Paul Connell (24 saves / 27 shots); John Burke (2 saves / 3 shots)

Maine won series 9–4

==== (E2) St. Lawrence vs. (W3) Wisconsin ====
March 26	St. Lawrence	7 – 0	Wisconsin	Appleton Arena	Recap
(Baker) Brian McColgan - PP GW - 01:43 (Ball) Russ Mann - 18:51		First period	No scoring
No scoring		Second period	No scoring
(Lammens, Consorte) Andy Pritchard - 08:02 (McColgan, McGeough) Peter Lappin - PP - 09:17 (Baker) Joe Day - 14:48 (Witherall) Joe Day - 16:42 (Ball) Chris Consorte - 18:49		Third period	No scoring
(23 saves / 23 shots) Paul Cohen		Goalie stats	Dean Anderson (33 saves / 40 shots)

March 27	St. Lawrence	3 – 4	Wisconsin	Appleton Arena	Recap
(Consorte, Pritchard) Martyn Ball - 13:55		First period	No scoring
No scoring		Second period	03:48 - Dennis Snedden (unassisted); 09:23 - Joe Decker (Andringa); 18:02 - Paul Ranheim (Tuttle, Andringa)
(T. Lappin) Peter Lappin - SH - 04:46 (Consorte, P. Lappin) Andy Pritchard - 10:50		Third period	14:34 - GW - Paul Stanton (Tancill, Poss)
(28 saves / 32 shots) Paul Cohen		Goalie stats	Dean Anderson (33 saves / 36 shots)

St. Lawrence won series 10–4

==== (W1) Minnesota vs. (W5) Michigan State ====
March 25	Minnesota	4 – 2	Michigan State	Mariucci Arena
(Miller) Paul Broten – 07:03 (Broten, Grannis) Todd Richards – 19:42		First period	03:15 – Bobby Reynolds (Russell, Cole)
(Hankinson, Orth) Scott Bloom – GW – 10:54		Second period	No scoring
(Broten) David Grannis – 18:38		Third period	14:12 – Bruce Rendall (unassisted)
(29 saves / 31 shots) Robb Stauber		Goalie stats	Jason Muzzatti (26 saves / 30 shots)

March 26	Minnesota	4 – 3	Michigan State	Mariucci Arena
No scoring		First period	05:42 – Kip Miller (Murray, Beadle)
(Werness, Skarda) Jay Cates – 17:14		Second period	10:02 - PP – Kip Miller (Murray, Beadle); 15:35 – Kip Miller (Kv. Miller, Hamilton)
(Cates) Grant Bischoff – 07:44 (unassisted) Todd Richards – 13:10 (Skarda) Jason Miller – EN GW – 19:56		Third period	No scoring
(32 saves / 35 shots) Robb Stauber		Goalie stats	Jason Muzzatti (28 saves / 31 shots)

Minnesota won series 8–5

==== (W2) Lake Superior State vs. (W6) Merrimack ====
March 25	Lake Superior State	3 – 4	Merrimack	Norris Center	Recap
(Dowd, Vermette) Pete Stauber - 18:16		First period	No scoring
(Stauber, Keczmer) Mark Vermette - 03:26 (deCarle) Mark Vermette - PP - 13:41		Second period	07:45 - PP - Richard Pion (Kiene, Boyce); 11:20 - Richard Pion (Alcott)
No scoring		Third period	05:58 - Mark Ziliotto (Vesey); 19:08 - GW - Jim Vesey (LeBeau, Jay)
(25 saves / 29 shots) Bruce Hoffort		Goalie stats	Jim Hrivnak (38 saves / 41 shots)

March 26	Lake Superior State	5 – 0	Merrimack	Norris Center	Recap
(unassisted) - Karl Johnston - SH GW - 17:43		First period	No scoring
(Dowd, Johnston) - Anthony Palumbo - PP - 12:48 (Vermette) Craig Hewson - 15:03		Second period	No scoring
(deCarle, Barnett) - Anthony Palumbo - 10:04 (Barnett, Dowd) - Anthony Palumbo - PP - 11:29		Third period	No scoring
(21 saves / 21 shots) Bruce Hoffort		Goalie stats	Jim Hrivnak (35 saves / 40 shots)

Lake Superior State won series 8–4

== Frozen Four ==
=== National Semifinal ===
==== (E1) Maine vs. (W2) Lake Superior State ====
March 31	Maine	3 – 6	Lake Superior State	Olympic Center	Recap
(Thyer, Lalonde) Dave Capuano - 00:52 (Weinrich, Golden) Dave Capuano - PP - 02:48		First period	14:30 - PP - Mike deCarle (Stauber)
No scoring		Second period	08:23 - Mike deCarle (Barnett, Johnston); 09:08 - Jim Dowd (Stauber); 18:37 - GW - Kord Cernich (Barnett, Palumbo)
(Weinrich, Perron) Mike Golden - 03:01		Third period	11:32 - Karl Johnston (Dyer, Hossack); 12:25 - Jim Dowd (Stauber, Chapdelaine)
(29 saves / 35 shots) Scott King		Goalie stats	Bruce Hoffort (33 saves / 36 shots)

==== (W1) Minnesota vs. (E2) St. Lawrence ====
April 1	Minnesota	2 – 3	St. Lawrence	Olympic Center	Recap
(Broten) David Espe - 00:28		First period	07:19 - PP - Peter Lappin (McGeough, Baker)
(Cates, P. Hankinson) Randy Skarda - PP - 05:39		Second period	12:03 - Peter Lappin (White, Buckeridge)
No scoring		Third period	19:48 - GW - Peter Lappin (Day, Robertson)
(34 saves / 37 shots) Robb Stauber		Goalie stats	Paul Cohen (36 saves / 38 shots)

=== Third-place game ===
==== (E1) Maine vs. (W1) Minnesota ====
April 2	Maine	5 – 2	Minnesota	Olympic Center	Recap
No scoring		First period	19:41 - Jay Cates (Broten, Grannis)
(Jenkins, Scremin) Guy Perron - 09:14 (D. Capuano) Dave Wensley - PP - 11:02 (J. Capuano, Lalonde) Dave Capuano - GW - 13:55		Second period	15:44 - Jay Cates (Broten, Strot)
(Guidotti) Eric Weinrich - 01:33 (Golden) Vince Guidotti - 14:39		Third period	No scoring
(39 saves / 41 shots) Al Loring		Goalie stats	Robb Stauber (38 saves / 43 shots); Al Fritzinger (0 saves / 0 shots)

=== National Championship ===
==== (W2) Lake Superior State vs. (E2) St. Lawrence ====
April 2	Lake Superior State	4 – 3	OT	St. Lawrence	Olympic Center

Scoring summary
Period	Team	Goal	Assist(s)	Time	Score
1st	LSSU	Tim Harris	Laprade and Keczmer	05:46	1–0 LSSU
1st	LSSU	Kord Cernich - PP	Palumbo and deCarle	16:48	2–0 LSSU
2nd	SLU	Doug Murray	McColgan and P. Lappin	22:16	2–1 LSSU
2nd	SLU	Russ Mann	unassisted	27:39	2–2
2nd	LSSU	Kord Cernich - PP	deCarle and Vermette	32:19	3–2 LSSU
2nd	SLU	Brian McColgan - PP	P. Lappin and Baker	37:24	3–3
3rd	No scoring				
1st Overtime	LSSU	Mark Vermette - GW	Hossack and Dowd	64:46	4–3 LSSU
Penalty summary
Period	Team	Player	Penalty	Time	PIM
1st	LSSU	Karl Johnston	Cross-checking	6:40	2:00
1st	LSSU	Kord Cernich	Slashing	8:15	2:00
1st	LSSU	Tim Harris	Roughing	11:05	2:00
1st	SLU	Jamie Baker	Holding	15:41	2:00
1st	SLU	Mark Lammens	High-sticking	16:03	2:00
1st	LSSU	Pete Stauber	High-sticking	16:03	2:00
1st	LSSU	Doug Laprade	Hooking	17:26	2:00
2nd	LSSU	Karl Johnston	Holding	22:30	2:00
2nd	LSSU	Terry Hossack	Holding	24:36	2:00
2nd	SLU	Jamie Baker	Slashing	31:25	2:00
2nd	LSSU	Craig Hewson	Slashing	31:25	2:00
2nd	SLU	Pete McGeough	Holding	31:37	2:00
2nd	SLU	Brian McColgan	Slashing	33:09	2:00
2nd	LSSU	Jeff Jablonski	Elbowing	35:37	2:00
2nd	LSSU	Tim Harris	Holding	39:07	2:00
2nd	SLU	Martyn Ball	Holding	39:07	2:00
3rd	LSSU	Tim Breslin	Holding	40:38	2:00
3rd	SLU	Joe Day	Hooking	47:14	2:00
3rd	SLU	Russ Mann	Holding	55:38	2:00
3rd	LSSU	Mark Vermette	Roughing	55:38	2:00
1st Overtime	none				

Shots by period
Team	1	2	3	OT	Total
St. Lawrence	20	19	6	7	52
Lake Superior State	8	11	14	2	35

Goaltenders
Team	Name	Saves	Goals against	Time on ice
SLU	Paul Cohen	31	4	
LSSU	Bruce Hoffort	49	3	

== All-Tournament Team ==
- G: Bruce Hoffort* (Lake Superior State)
- D: Kord Cernich (Lake Superior State)
- D: Brian McColgan (St. Lawrence)
- F: Dave Capuano (Maine)
- F: Mike de Carle (Lake Superior State)
- F: Pete Lappin (St. Lawrence)

* Most Outstanding Player(s)
