= 1988 ECAC Hockey men's ice hockey tournament =

1988 ECAC Men's ice hockey tournament
- Dates: March 4–12, 1988
- Teams: 8
- Finals site: Boston Garden; Boston, Massachusetts
- Champions: St. Lawrence (2nd title)
- Winning coach: Joe Marsh (1st title)
- MVP: Pete Lappin (St. Lawrence)
- ECAC Men's Ice Hockey Tournaments

The 1988 ECAC Hockey Men's Ice Hockey Tournament was the 27th tournament in league history. It was played between March 4 and March 12, 1988. Quarterfinal games were played at home team campus sites, while the 'final four' games were played at the Boston Garden in Boston, Massachusetts. By winning the tournament, St. Lawrence received the ECAC's automatic bid to the 1988 NCAA Division I Men's Ice Hockey Tournament.

== Format ==
The tournament featured three rounds of play. The four teams that finish below eighth place in the standings are not eligible for tournament play. In the quarterfinals the first seed and eighth seed, the second seed and seventh seed, the third seed and sixth seed and the fourth seed and fifth seed played a two-game series to determine the winner. In the two games no overtime was permitted and if the two teams remained tied after the two games then a 10-minute mini-game would be played where a sudden-death overtime was allowed if the scheduled time did not produce a victor. After the opening round every series becomes a single-elimination game. In the semifinals, the highest seed plays the lowest remaining seed while the two remaining teams play with the winners advancing to the championship game and the losers advancing to the third place game. The tournament champion receives an automatic bid to the 1988 NCAA Division I Men's Ice Hockey Tournament.

== Conference standings ==
Note: GP = Games played; W = Wins; L = Losses; T = Ties; PTS = Points; GF = Goals For; GA = Goals Against

1987–88 ECAC Hockey standings
	Conference							Overall					
	GP	W	L	T	PTS	GF	GA	GP	W	L	T	GF	GA
Harvard†	22	18	4	0	36	93	52	32	21	11	0	132	96
St. Lawrence†*	22	18	4	0	36	124	70	38	29	9	0	200	112
Cornell	22	15	7	0	30	98	68	28	19	9	0	121	81
Vermont	22	14	7	1	29	81	67	35	21	11	3	127	101
Colgate	22	13	8	1	27	105	63	32	18	11	3	156	104
Clarkson	22	10	9	3	23	86	82	35	17	15	3	133	125
Princeton	22	11	10	1	23	80	77	28	12	15	1	94	110
Rensselaer	22	9	13	0	18	99	91	32	15	17	0	164	125
Dartmouth	22	8	13	1	17	59	84	26	10	15	1	70	98
Yale	22	6	16	0	12	60	97	26	6	20	0	76	128
Army	22	3	17	2	8	59	119	30	9	19	2	97	151
Brown	22	2	19	1	5	46	120	26	3	22	1	63	144
Championship: St. Lawrence † indicates conference regular season champion * indicates conference tournament champion

== Bracket ==
Teams are reseeded after the first round

Quarterfinals; March 4–5
1	Harvard	5	6	—
8	Rensselaer	4	4	—
2	St. Lawrence	5	10	—
7	Princeton	1	1	—
(Pairings are reseeded after the first round)
3	Cornell	3	4	0
6	Clarkson	4	2	1
4	Vermont	8	3	—
5	Colgate	0	3	—

Semifinals; March 11
1	Harvard	4
6	Clarkson	6
2	St. Lawrence	4
4	Vermont	2

Championship; March 12
2	St. Lawrence	3
6	Clarkson	0
Third Place
1	Harvard	7
4	Vermont	1

Note: * denotes overtime period(s)

=== Quarterfinals ===
==== (1) Harvard vs. (8) Rensselaer ====
March 4	Harvard	5 – 4	Rensselaer	Bright Hockey Center

March 5	Harvard	6 – 4	Rensselaer	Bright Hockey Center

Harvard won series 2–0

==== (2) St. Lawrence vs. (7) Princeton ====
March 4	St. Lawrence	5 – 1	Princeton	Appleton Arena

March 5	St. Lawrence	10 – 1	Princeton	Appleton Arena

St. Lawrence won series 2–0

==== (3) Cornell vs. (6) Clarkson ====
March 4	Cornell	3 – 4	Clarkson	Lynah Rink

March 5	Cornell	4 – 2	Clarkson	Lynah Rink

March 5	Cornell	0 – 1 (mini)	Clarkson	Lynah Rink

Clarkson won series 2–1

==== (4) Vermont vs. (5) Colgate ====
March 4	Vermont	8 – 0	Colgate	Gutterson Fieldhouse

March 5	Vermont	3 – 3	Colgate	Gutterson Fieldhouse

Vermont won series 1–0–1

=== Semifinals ===
==== (1) Harvard vs. (6) Clarkson ====
March 11	Harvard	4 – 6	Clarkson	Boston Garden

==== (2) St. Lawrence vs. (4) Vermont ====
March 11	St. Lawrence	4 – 2	Vermont	Boston Garden

=== Third Place ===
==== (1) Harvard vs. (4) Vermont ====
March 12	Harvard	7 – 1	Vermont	Boston Garden

=== Championship ===
==== (2) St. Lawrence vs. (6) Clarkson ====
March 12	St. Lawrence	3 – 0	Clarkson	Boston Garden

== Tournament awards ==
=== All-Tournament Team ===
- F Peter Ciavaglia (Harvard)
- F Pete Lappin* (St. Lawrence)
- F Steve Williams (Clarkson)
- D Pete McGeough (St. Lawrence)
- D Hank Lammens (St. Lawrence)
- G John Fletcher (Clarkson)

* Most Outstanding Player(s)
