= 1991 CCHA men's ice hockey tournament =

1991 CCHA Men's ice hockey tournament
- Dates: March 1–9, 1991
- Teams: 8
- Finals site: Joe Louis Arena; Detroit, Michigan
- Champions: Lake Superior State (1st title)
- Winning coach: Jeff Jackson (1st title)
- MVP: Clayton Beddoes (Lake Superior State)
- CCHA Men's Ice Hockey Tournaments

The 1991 CCHA Men's Ice Hockey Tournament was the 20th CCHA Men's Ice Hockey Tournament. It was played between March 1 and March 9, 1991. First round games were played at campus sites, while 'final four' games were played at Joe Louis Arena in Detroit, Michigan. By winning the tournament, Lake Superior State received the Central Collegiate Hockey Association's automatic bid to the 1991 NCAA Division I Men's Ice Hockey Tournament.

== Format ==
The tournament featured three rounds of play. The team that finished below eighth place in the standings was not eligible for postseason play. In the quarterfinals, the first and eighth seeds, the second and seventh seeds, the third seed and sixth seeds and the fourth seed and fifth seeds played a best-of-three series, with the winners advancing to the semifinals. In the semifinals, the remaining highest and lowest seeds and second highest and second lowest seeds play a single-game, with the winners advancing to the finals. The tournament champion receives an automatic bid to the 1991 NCAA Division I Men's Ice Hockey Tournament.

== Conference standings ==
Note: GP = Games played; W = Wins; L = Losses; T = Ties; PTS = Points; GF = Goals For; GA = Goals Against

1990–91 Central Collegiate Hockey Association standings
	Conference							Overall					
	GP	W	L	T	PTS	GF	GA	GP	W	L	T	GF	GA
Lake Superior State†*	32	26	2	4	56	181	77	45	36	5	4	252	122
Michigan	32	24	5	3	51	178	107	47	34	10	3	248	162
Ferris State	32	15	12	5	35	122	111	42	23	14	5	174	144
Western Michigan	32	16	14	2	34	121	115	42	22	17	3	161	161
Michigan State	32	14	13	5	33	130	101	40	17	18	5	155	130
Bowling Green	32	13	17	2	28	123	144	40	15	23	2	149	190
Ohio State	32	9	19	4	22	99	158	40	11	25	4	135	209
Illinois-Chicago	32	9	21	2	20	112	150	38	13	23	2	143	165
Miami	32	3	26	3	9	78	181	37	5	29	3	97	219
Championship: Lake Superior State † indicates conference regular season champion * indicates conference tournament champion

== Bracket ==
Quarterfinals; March 1–3
1	Lake Superior State	5	3	–
8	Illinois–Chicago	3	1	–
2	Michigan	5	9	–
7	Ohio State	4	4	–
(Pairings are reseeded after the first round)
3	Ferris State	5	3*	–
6	Bowling Green	3	2	–
4	Western Michigan	4	4	–
5	Michigan State	3	2	–

Semifinals; March 7
1	Lake Superior State	11
4	Western Michigan	4
2	Michigan	4
3	Ferris State	2

Championship; March 9
1	Lake Superior State	6*
2	Michigan	5
Consolation Game
3	Ferris State	1
4	Western Michigan	2*

Note: * denotes overtime period(s)

=== First round ===
==== (1) Lake Superior State vs. (8) Illinois–Chicago ====
Lake Superior State	5 – 3	Illinois–Chicago	Taffy Abel Arena

Lake Superior State	3 – 1	Illinois–Chicago	Taffy Abel Arena

Lake Superior State won series 2–0

==== (2) Michigan vs. (7) Ohio State ====
Michigan	5 – 4	Ohio State	Yost Ice Arena

Michigan	9 – 4	Ohio State	Yost Ice Arena

Michigan won series 2–0

==== (3) Ferris State vs. (6) Bowling Green ====
Ferris State	5 – 3	Bowling Green	Ewigleben Arena

Ferris State	3 – 2	OT	Bowling Green	Ewigleben Arena

Ferris State won series 2–0

==== (4) Western Michigan vs. (5) Michigan State ====
Western Michigan	4 – 3	Michigan State	Lawson Arena

Western Michigan	4 – 2	Michigan State	Lawson Arena

Western Michigan won series 2–0

=== Semifinals ===
==== (1) Lake Superior State vs. (4) Western Michigan ====
March 7	Lake Superior State	11 – 4	Western Michigan	Joe Louis Arena

==== (2) Michigan vs. (3) Ferris State ====
March 7	Michigan	4 – 2	Ferris State	Joe Louis Arena

=== Consolation Game ===
==== (3) Ferris State vs. (4) Western Michigan ====
March 9	Ferris State	1 – 2	OT	Western Michigan	Joe Louis Arena

=== Championship ===
==== (1) Lake Superior State vs. (2) Michigan ====
March 9	Lake Superior State	6 – 5	OT	Michigan	Joe Louis Arena

== Tournament awards ==
=== All-Tournament Team ===
- F Mike Eastwood (Western Michigan)
- F Doug Weight (Lake Superior State)
- F Don Stone (Michigan)
- D Aaron Ward (Michigan)
- D Karl Johnston (Lake Superior State)
- G Darrin Madeley (Lake Superior State)

=== MVP ===
- Clayton Beddoes (Lake Superior State)
