= Jim Roque =

Canadian ice hockey player and coach

Biographical details
- Born: May 2, 1963 (age 63); Sudbury, Ontario, Canada
- Education: Lake Superior State University

Playing career
- 1983–1987: Lake Superior State
- Position: Forward

Coaching career (HC unless noted)
- 1987–1991: Lake Superior State (Assistant)
- 1991–1993: Minot Americans
- 1994–1995: Lake Superior State (Assistant)
- 1995–2001: Clarkson (Assistant)
- 2001–2005: Lake Superior State (Assistant)
- 2005–2014: Lake Superior State

Head coaching record
- Overall: 136-165-46 (.458)

Jim Roque (born May 2, 1963) is a Canadian ice hockey former player and coach who is currently working as a pro scout for the Toronto Maple Leafs.

== Early life ==
Roque grew up in Killarney, Ontario. His family are members of the Wahnapitae First Nation. He said his mother discouraged him and his siblings from divulging their Indigenous heritage, fearing they would be placed in the Indian residential school system.

== Career ==
Roque debuted for Lake Superior State in the 1983–84 season helping the Lakers to their first NCAA tournament in his sophomore season. After graduating in 1987 Roque immediately turned to coaching and was behind the bench when his alma mater won their first national title in 1988. Roque stayed in Sault Sainte Marie until 1991 when he left to become the head coach for the Minot Americans. After a short stint in the SJHL Roque returned to Lake Superior State as an assistant for 1994–95 before heading out a second time to become an assistant coach for Clarkson.

Roque was lured back to the Lakers once more when his old coach Frank Anzalone began a second tenure with the team and played assistant for four more years before Anzalone resigned and turned the team over to Roque. Anzalone's return was a disaster for the program, posting four consecutive seasons with single-digit wins (the first four in the 39-year history of the team). Roque responded immediately by getting the team their first winning season since the turn of the century and followed it up the year after with their first 20-win campaign since Jeff Jackson left in 1995–96. For the rest of his time with the team, Roque kept them close to the .500 mark but could only get them one more winning season before the university announced that they would not be renewing his contract after the 2013–14 season.

After leaving the university for the third time Roque was hired by the Arizona Coyotes as a pro scout. As of 2022, he works as a pro scout with the Toronto Maple Leafs.

== Personal life ==
Roque's daughter Abby is the first ever indigenous member of the United States women's national ice hockey team. She plays professionally in the PWHL for the Montreal Victoire.

== Head coaching record ==
=== College ===
Record table
Season	Team	Overall	Conference	Standing	Postseason
Lake Superior State Lakers (CCHA) (2005–2013)
2005–06	Lake Superior State	15-14-7	11-12-5	t-6th	CCHA First Round
2006–07	Lake Superior State	21-19-3	11-14-3	8th	CCHA Third Place Game (Loss)
2007–08	Lake Superior State	10-20-7	7-15-6	t-9th	CCHA First Round
2008–09	Lake Superior State	11-20-8	7-15-6-1	t-10th	CCHA First Round
2009–10	Lake Superior State	15-18-5	10-15-3-2	10th	CCHA First Round
2010–11	Lake Superior State	13-17-9	8-12-8-5	8th	CCHA Quarterfinals
2011–12	Lake Superior State	18-17-5	11-13-4-4	7th	CCHA Quarterfinals
2012–13	Lake Superior State	17-21-1	11-16-1-1	8th	CCHA First Round
Lake Superior State:		120-146-45	76-112-36		
Lake Superior State Lakers (WCHA) (2013–2014)
2013–14	Lake Superior State	16-19-1	12-16-0	t-8th	Failed to qualify for WCHA Tournament
Lake Superior State:		16-19-1	12-16-0		
Total:		136-165-46			
National champion Postseason invitational champion Conference regular season champion Conference regular season and conference tournament champion Division regular season champion Division regular season and conference tournament champion Conference tournament champion
