= 1988 CCHA men's ice hockey tournament =

1988 CCHA Men's ice hockey tournament
- Dates: March 4–12, 1988
- Teams: 8
- Finals site: Joe Louis Arena; Detroit, Michigan
- Champions: Bowling Green (5th title)
- Winning coach: Jerry York (1st title)
- MVP: Paul Connell (Bowling Green)
- CCHA Men's Ice Hockey Tournaments

The 1988 CCHA Men's Ice Hockey Tournament was the 17th CCHA Men's Ice Hockey Tournament. It was played between March 4 and March 12, 1988. First round games were played at campus sites, while 'final four' games were played at Joe Louis Arena in Detroit, Michigan. By winning the tournament, Bowling Green received the Central Collegiate Hockey Association's automatic bid to the 1988 NCAA Division I Men's Ice Hockey Tournament.

== Format ==
The tournament featured three rounds of play. The team that finished below eighth place in the standings was not eligible for postseason play. In the quarterfinals, the first and eighth seeds, the second and seventh seeds, the third seed and sixth seeds and the fourth seed and fifth seeds played a best-of-three series, with the winners advancing to the semifinals. In the semifinals, the remaining highest and lowest seeds and second highest and second lowest seeds play a single-game, with the winners advancing to the finals. The tournament champion receives an automatic bid to the 1988 NCAA Division I Men's Ice Hockey Tournament.

== Conference standings ==
Note: GP = Games played; W = Wins; L = Losses; T = Ties; PTS = Points; GF = Goals For; GA = Goals Against

1987–88 Central Collegiate Hockey Association standings
	Conference							Overall					
	GP	W	L	T	PTS	GF	GA	GP	W	L	T	GF	GA
Lake Superior State†	32	22	4	6	50	163	97	46	33	7	6	233	139
Bowling Green*	32	19	11	2	40	190	144	45	30	13	2	258	188
Michigan State	32	18	11	3	39	151	123	46	27	16	3	222	173
Western Michigan	32	17	12	3	37	152	136	42	22	17	3	208	184
Michigan	32	17	15	0	34	140	131	41	22	19	0	176	171
Illinois-Chicago	32	14	17	1	29	137	138	39	18	20	1	170	169
Ferris State	32	11	17	4	26	118	165	40	15	20	5	155	198
Ohio State	32	7	21	4	18	116	178	40	10	24	6	138	209
Miami	32	7	24	1	15	113	168	38	12	25	1	145	187
Championship: Bowling Green † indicates conference regular season champion * indicates conference tournament champion

== Bracket ==
Quarterfinals; March 4–6
1	Lake Superior State	6	4	–
8	Ohio State	2	1	–
2	Bowling Green	5****	6	–
7	Ferris State	4	3	–
(Pairings are reseeded after the first round)
3	Michigan State	9	6	–
6	Illinois–Chicago	4	3	–
4	Western Michigan	4	4	10
5	Michigan	5	3	0

Semifinals; March 10
1	Lake Superior State	5*
4	Western Michigan	4
2	Bowling Green	6
3	Michigan State	4

Championship; March 12
1	Lake Superior State	3
2	Bowling Green	5
Consolation Game
3	Michigan State	9
4	Western Michigan	6

Note: * denotes overtime period(s)

=== First round ===
==== (1) Lake Superior State vs. (8) Ohio State ====
Lake Superior State	6 – 2	Ohio State	Taffy Abel Arena

Lake Superior State	4 – 1	Ohio State	Taffy Abel Arena

Lake Superior State won series 2–0

==== (2) Bowling Green vs. (7) Ferris State ====
Bowling Green	5 – 4	4OT	Ferris State	BGSU Ice Arena

Bowling Green	6 – 3	Ferris State	BGSU Ice Arena

Bowling Green won series 2–0

==== (3) Michigan State vs. (6) Illinois–Chicago ====
Michigan State	9 – 4	Illinois–Chicago	Munn Ice Arena

Michigan State	6 – 3	Illinois–Chicago	Munn Ice Arena

Michigan State won series 2–0

==== (4) Western Michigan vs. (5) Michigan ====
Western Michigan	4 – 5	Michigan	Lawson Arena

Western Michigan	4 – 3	Michigan	Lawson Arena

Western Michigan	10 – 0	Michigan	Lawson Arena

Western Michigan won series 2–1

=== Semifinals ===
==== (1) Lake Superior State vs. (4) Western Michigan ====
March 10	Lake Superior State	5 – 4	OT	Western Michigan	Joe Louis Arena

==== (2) Bowling Green vs. (3) Michigan State ====
March 10	Bowling Green	6 – 4	Michigan State	Joe Louis Arena

=== Consolation Game ===
==== (3) Michigan State vs. (4) Western Michigan ====
March 12	Michigan State	9 – 6	Western Michigan	Joe Louis Arena

=== Championship ===
==== (1) Lake Superior State vs. (2) Bowling Green ====
March 12	Lake Superior State	3 – 5	Bowling Green	Joe Louis Arena

== Tournament awards ==
=== All-Tournament Team ===
- F Don Barber (Bowling Green)
- F Brett Barnett (Lake Superior State)
- F Bobby Reynolds (Michigan State)
- D Scott Paluch (Bowling Green)
- D Karl Johnston (Lake Superior State)
- G Paul Connell* (Bowling Green)

* Most Valuable Player(s)
