= Brian McColgan =

American ice hockey player (born 1966)

- Born: June 23, 1966 (age 60) Norwood, Massachusetts, USA
- Height: 5 ft 7 in (170 cm)
- Weight: 150 lb (68 kg; 10 st 10 lb)
- Position: Defenseman
- Shot: Left
- Played for: St. Lawrence; KooKoo; Tyringe SoSS; Ritten Sport; HC Milano Saima; HC Merano
- National team: United States
- Playing career: 1984–1999

Brian McColgan is an American retired ice hockey defenseman who was an All-American for St. Lawrence.

== Career ==
After high school, McColgan was planning on attending West Point, however, during the summer camp prior to entry, he decided that he belonged on a different career path. He returned home and was discovered by St. Lawrence assistant Joe Marsh in a rec league. McColgan was brought to Canton part way through the 1985 season and finished out the final 19 games of the Saints' campaign.

When Marsh took over as head coach the following year, McColgan saw his production jump significantly and led the defense with 10 goals. The team's fortunes began to change in McColgan's junior season and the Larries produced their best finish in 19 years. The team got hot in the playoffs and ended up making their first conference championship game in 23 seasons. Though they lost, St. Lawrence made the NCAA Tournament and looked to be on the upswing.

In McColgan's senior season, everything seemed to be going right for the Saints. McColgan more than doubled his previous career best for points and led the nation in points per game from the blueline (1.36). He was named an All-American and led the Saints to their first regular season ECAC Hockey title (tied). The Saints then went charging through the conference tournament and won just the second conference championship in team history (the first since the inaugural ECAC tournament in 1962). St. Lawrence received the second eastern seed and, due to the new NCAA Tournament arrangement, received a bye into the quarterfinal round. They thoroughly dominated Wisconsin in the first game, winning 7–0, and enabled the team to take it easy in the second match. SLU returned to the Frozen Four for the first time since 1962 and met top western seed Minnesota. The two fought a hard battle but the Saints came out on top with a narrow 3–2 win.

The Larries went to just their second championship game and performed much better than they had in their first. While the team got behind 0–2 after the first, McColgan assisted on SLU's first goal and then scored to tie the game 3–3 in the second. With time waning and the Larries threatening, Lake Superior's Pete Stauber pushed the net off of its moorings and stopped play. While most thought he should have received a penalty for the maneuver, no infraction was assessed and the teams would need overtime to decide the victor. Unfortunately for St. Lawrence, the Lakers scored first and skated away with the championship.

After graduating, McColgan headed to Finland to start his professional career. His first year with KooKoo turned out poorly for both him and the team and he moved on to Division 1 (the Swedish second league at the time) for two years. He performed much better with Tyringe SoSS but the team narrowly missed out on the postseason in the second year. During this time he was a member of two US Teams at the Spengler Cup, helping the club win the title in 1988.

In 1991 he headed south and joined SV Ritten, spending most of the next 4 years with the club. He ended up with HC Merano in 1996 and helped the club receive a promotion to Serie A in his first year with the club. He played at the top level of Italian hockey for three years, retiring after helping Merano win the championship in 1999. In 2009 McColgan became an assistant coach for Dexter Southfield School, a position he still holds as of 2021.

McColgan was inducted into the St. Lawrence Athletic Hall of Fame in 2015.

== Statistics ==
=== Regular season and playoffs ===
			Regular Season					Playoffs
Season	Team	League	GP	G	A	Pts	PIM	GP	G	A	Pts	PIM
1984–85	St. Lawrence	ECAC Hockey	19	1	3	4	10	—	—	—	—	—
1985–86	St. Lawrence	ECAC Hockey	24	10	13	23	26	—	—	—	—	—
1986–87	St. Lawrence	ECAC Hockey	34	3	21	24	26	—	—	—	—	—
1987–88	St. Lawrence	ECAC Hockey	36	17	32	49	37	—	—	—	—	—
1988–89	KooKoo	SM-liiga	24	2	0	2	22	—	—	—	—	—
1989–90	Tyringe SoSS	Division 1	32	8	24	32	42	4	1	1	2	18
1990–91	Tyringe SoSS	Division 1	26	3	14	17	37	—	—	—	—	—
1991–92	SV Ritten	Serie B	24	18	12	30	28	—	—	—	—	—
1992–93	SV Ritten	Serie B	—	—	—	—	—	—	—	—	—	—
1993–94	SV Ritten	Serie B	—	—	—	—	—	—	—	—	—	—
1994–95	HC Milano Saima	Serie A	8	2	5	7	6	—	—	—	—	—
1994–95	SV Ritten	Serie B	20	20	24	44	16	10	9	15	24	20
1995–96	HC Merano	Serie B	34	31	41	72	63	11	4	19	23	14
1996–97	HC Merano	Serie A	—	—	—	—	—	—	—	—	—	—
1997–98	HC Merano	Serie A	34	22	30	52	73	—	—	—	—	—
1998–99	HC Merano	Serie A	15	6	13	19	19	10	2	8	10	10
NCAA totals			113	31	69	100	99	—	—	—	—	—
Division 1 totals			58	11	38	49	79	4	1	1	2	18

=== International ===
Year	Team	Event	Result	GP	G	A	Pts	PIM
1988	USA Selects	Spengler Cup	Gold	5	0	0	0	—
1989	USA Selects	Spengler Cup	4th	—	—	—	—	—

== Awards and honors ==
Award	Year
All-ECAC Hockey First Team	1987–88
AHCA East First-Team All-American	1987–88
All-NCAA All-Tournament Team	1988
