= Richard Pion =

American ice hockey player (born 1965)

- Born: July 20, 1965 (age 60) Oxnard, California , U.S.
- Height: 5 ft 9 in (175 cm)
- Weight: 171 lb (78 kg; 12 st 3 lb)
- Position: Center
- Shot: Right
- Played for: Merrimack College; Peoria Rivermen; St. Gabriel Blizzard; Joliette Mission; Granby Predateurs; Sorel Royaux
- Playing career: 1985–2003

Richard Pion (born July 20, 1965) is a former American ice hockey player best known for his time with Merrimack the Peoria Rivermen, as well as his time in the Ligue Nord-Américaine de Hockey league.

== Career ==
Pion attended Merrimack in 1985. Not seeing much playing time his freshman year he would take a big leap his sophomore year. Playing in 36 games and scoring 31 goals and tallying 33 assists helping Merrimack win their first ECAC east championship. During his junior year he would have a 75-point season scoring 35 goals with 40 assists. Winning another conference title as well as well as playing in the 1988 NCAA tournament where he would score one goal in Merrimacks first round upset of Northeastern. He would then have a 70-point season his senior year winning a third straight conference title. He led the team in points in 1986-87 and 1988–89. He would leave Merrimack as second in all-time points with 231.

After graduating, Pion signed with the IHL affiliate of the St Louis Blues the Peoria Rivermen. He appeared in 69 games his first year scoring 10 goals and tallying 21 assists. The following year, during the 1990–91 season, the Rivermen made the IHL playoffs and Pion appeared in 17 playoff games scoring 3 goals with 5 assists as he and the Rivermen won Turner cup. During the 1991-92 next year he had an IHL career high 71 point season. He went on to play another three seasons with the Rivermen. During his time with the Rivermen he became a strong penalty killer along with Mark Bassen the forward tandem went unscored on in 96 percent of their chances during the 1991-92 Rivermen title defense season.

During his tenure, the Rivermen Captain Boosters Club named him to the Pete BardezBanian Trophy four times as the team's most popular player.

In 1996, he left the minor leagues and signed with the St. Gabriel Blizzard of the Ligue Nord-Américaine de Hockey league. He played in 36 games during his first year, putting up sensational numbers, scoring 83 points (30 goals 53 assists). He followed this up with a similar performance the following year scoring 82 points in 33 games. In 1998, he signed with Joliette Blizzard. He played 4 seasons with them. During the 2000–01 season He appeared in 36 games tallying 44 points as Juliette made the playoffs. Pion scored 1 goal in the playoffs and won a league title., before playing for Sorel Royaux for a year. He then played for one year with Granby Predateurs during the 2002–03 season and ultimately retiring.

After retirement he moved to Repentigny, Quebec. Where He served as business development manager for Old Dutch Foods. He has two daughters.

Pion was inducted into the Peoria Rivermen Hall of Fame in 2005.

In 2023, Pion was inducted into the Merrimack athletics Hall of fame.

== Career statistics ==
Regular Season						Playoffs							
Season	Team	Lge	GP	G	A	Pts	PIM	+/-	GP	G	A	Pts	PIM
1985-86	Merrimack College	ECAC East	14	9	13	22	10						
1986-87	Merrimack College	ECAC East	36	31	33	64	22						
1987-88	Merrimack College	ECAC east	40	35	40	75	58						
1988-89	Merrimack College	ECAC east	34	28	42	70	34						
1989-90	Peoria Rivermen	IHL	69	10	21	31	58		5	0	0	0	0
1990-91	Peoria Rivermen	IHL	76	14	24	38	113		17	3	5	8	36
1991-92	Peoria Rivermen	IHL	82	21	50	71	173		9	3	1	4	30
1992-93	Peoria Rivermen	IHL	74	20	35	55	119	-1	3	2	1	3	8
1993-94	Peoria Rivermen	IHL	73	13	32	45	96	3	6	2	1	3	8
1994-95	Chicago Wolves	IHL	2	0	0	0	0	0	--	--	--	--	--
1995-96	Peoria Rivermen	IHL	2	1	0	1	0	1	--	--	--	--	--
1996-97	St. Gabriel Blizzard	QSPHL	36	30	53	83	63						
1997-98	St. Gabriel Blizzard	QSPHL	33	33	49	82	77						
1998-99	Joliette Blizzard	QSPHL	29	14	25	39	44						
1999-00	Joliette Blizzard	QSPHL	7	3	8	11	4		--	--	--	--	--
2000-01	Joliette Mission	QSPHL	36	17	27	44	41		22	6	12	18	44
2001-02	Joliette Mission	QSPHL	39	14	27	41	74		3	1	0	1	4
2002-03	Sorel Royaux	QSPHL	8	2	3	5	2		--	--	--	--	--
2002-03	Granby Predateurs	QSPHL	13	4	7	11	12		--	--	--	--	--

== Awards and honors ==
Award	Year
College
ECAC East champion	1986-87
ECAC East champion	1987-88
ECAC East champion	1988-89
Merrimack team MVP	1988-89
Merrimack athletics hall of fame	2023
IHL
Tuner Cup champion	1990-91
Peoria Rivermen Hall of Fame	2005
Ligue Nord-Américaine de Hockey
Ligue Nord-Américaine de Hockey champion	2000-01
