= Kord Cernich =

American ice hockey player (born 1966)

- Born: October 20, 1966 (age 59) Ketchikan, Alaska, USA
- Height: 5 ft 11 in (180 cm)
- Weight: 185 lb (84 kg; 13 st 3 lb)
- Position: Defenseman
- Shot: Right
- Played for: Lake Superior State; Binghamton Rangers; San Diego Gulls; Flint Bulldogs; Rochester Americans; Capital District Islanders; Nottingham Panthers; Fort Wayne Komets; Dayton Bombers; Anchorage Aces
- Playing career: 1986–2001

Kord Cernich (born October 20, 1966) is an American retired ice hockey Defenseman and coach who was a two-time All-American for Lake Superior State and helped the Lakers win their first National Championship in 1988.

== Career ==
Cernich played junior hockey for the Dubuque Fighting Saints after graduating from Service High School. He helped the team win the 1985 Clark Cup and followed that up with a spectacular final season in 1986 where he was named as the league's best defenseman. After accepting a scholarship to Lake Superior State University, he quickly became a major contributor for the Lakers, collecting 22 points as a freshman. During his second year, Cernich led the Lakers' defense in scoring and helped the team win their first NCAA Championship. Cernich scored twice in the title match, pushing the Lakers past St. Lawrence 4–3 in overtime.

Lake Superior continued to be a top program while Cernich was there, making two additional NCAA tournament appearances. He was named an All-American both as a junior and senior, leading the Lakers' defense in scoring in 1989 and serving as alternate captain in 1990. After graduating with a bachelor's in marketing, Cernich embarked on a long career in professional hockey. He spent the following season at the top level of the minor leagues. It was the closest he would come to the NHL as he found himself sinking down the minor league ladder over the next few years. He briefly experimented with playing in Europe in 1993 but returned before the season had ended and finished out the year in the ECHL.

In 1994 he returned to Alaska and began playing for the Anchorage Aces. He remained with the team for the next seven years, becoming a fixture on the blueline and playing over 300 games for the Aces. He retired following the 2001 season.

Cernich remained in Anchorage following the end of his playing days and worked as a general foreman for Arctic Electric for a dozen years. He left in 2013 to devote his full attention to being the owner/COO of Arctic Branding And Apparel, a clothing and equipment manufacturer that he co-founded with his wife Angela. He briefly returned to hockey in 2018, working as an assistant coach for the Alaska All Stars U14 team.

== Statistics ==
=== Regular season and playoffs ===
			Regular Season					Playoffs
Season	Team	League	GP	G	A	Pts	PIM	GP	G	A	Pts	PIM
1981–82	Service High School	AK-HS	—	—	—	—	—	—	—	—	—	—
1982–83	Service High School	AK-HS	—	—	—	—	—	—	—	—	—	—
1983–84	Dubuque Fighting Saints	USHL	27	8	7	15	59	—	—	—	—	—
1984–85	Dubuque Fighting Saints	USHL	48	7	24	31	—	12	1	11	12	—
1985–86	Dubuque Fighting Saints	USHL	48	20	46	66	66	—	—	—	—	—
1986–87	Lake Superior State	CCHA	39	4	18	22	32	—	—	—	—	—
1987–88	Lake Superior State	CCHA	46	16	23	39	78	—	—	—	—	—
1988–89	Lake Superior State	CCHA	46	7	31	38	74	—	—	—	—	—
1989–90	Lake Superior State	CCHA	46	11	25	36	59	—	—	—	—	—
1990–91	Binghamton Rangers	AHL	52	5	10	15	36	—	—	—	—	—
1991–92	Binghamton Rangers	AHL	5	1	3	4	6	—	—	—	—	—
1991–92	San Diego Gulls	IHL	64	5	18	23	53	3	1	0	1	0
1992–93	Rochester Americans	AHL	4	0	0	0	2	—	—	—	—	—
1992–93	Capital District Islanders	AHL	6	0	0	0	4	—	—	—	—	—
1992–93	San Diego Gulls	IHL	17	1	5	6	4	3	0	0	0	2
1992–93	Flint Bulldogs	CoHL	31	5	12	17	18	6	3	3	6	4
1993–94	Nottingham Panthers	BHL	23	4	9	13	22	—	—	—	—	—
1993–94	Fort Wayne Komets	IHL	3	0	0	0	4	—	—	—	—	—
1993–94	Dayton Bombers	ECHL	21	4	13	17	14	3	1	2	3	4
1994–95	Anchorage Aces	PHL	—	—	—	—	—	—	—	—	—	—
1995–96	Anchorage Aces	WCHL	57	4	24	28	57	—	—	—	—	—
1996–97	Anchorage Aces	WCHL	54	7	12	19	24	9	1	2	3	2
1997–98	Anchorage Aces	WCHL	64	4	19	23	64	8	0	2	2	12
1998–99	Anchorage Aces	WCHL	71	7	47	54	42	1	0	0	0	0
1999–00	Anchorage Aces	WCHL	71	3	28	31	62	4	0	0	0	0
2000–01	Anchorage Aces	WCHL	11	1	5	6	32	—	—	—	—	—
USHL totals			123	35	77	112	—	—	—	—	—	—
NCAA totals			177	38	97	135	243	—	—	—	—	—
AHL totals			67	6	13	19	48	—	—	—	—	—
IHL totals			84	6	23	29	61	6	1	0	1	2
WCHL totals			328	26	135	161	281	22	1	4	5	14

== Awards and honors ==
Award	Year
All-CCHA Second Team	1987–88
All-NCAA All-Tournament Team	1988
All-CCHA First Team	1988–89
AHCA West First-Team All-American	1988–89
All-CCHA First Team	1989–90
AHCA West Second-Team All-American	1989–90
CCHA All-Tournament Team	1990
