= Mark Vermette =

Canadian ice hockey player (born 1967)

- Born: October 3, 1967 (age 58) Cochenour, Ontario, Canada
- Height: 6 ft 1 in (185 cm)
- Weight: 203 lb (92 kg; 14 st 7 lb)
- Position: Right wing
- Shot: Right
- Played for: Quebec Nordiques
- NHL draft: 134th overall, 1986; Quebec Nordiques
- Playing career: 1988–1994

Mark A. Vermette (born October 3, 1967) is a Canadian former professional ice hockey player who played 67 games in the National Hockey League. He played with the Quebec Nordiques.

Vermette was born in Cochenour, Ontario. He was a member of the Lake Superior State Lakers 1988 NCAA Championship men's ice hockey team. He scored the winning goal in overtime to give the Lakers the championship.

== Career statistics ==
			Regular season					Playoffs
Season	Team	League	GP	G	A	Pts	PIM	GP	G	A	Pts	PIM
1984–85	Notre Dame Hounds	SJHL	43	24	28	52	—	—	—	—	—	—
1985–86	Lake Superior State University	NCAA	30	1	4	5	45	—	—	—	—	—
1986–87	Lake Superior State University	NCAA	38	19	17	36	59	—	—	—	—	—
1987–88	Lake Superior State University	NCAA	46	45	30	75	154	—	—	—	—	—
1988–89	Halifax Citadels	AHL	52	12	16	28	30	—	—	—	—	—
1988–89	Quebec Nordiques	NHL	12	0	4	4	7	—	—	—	—	—
1989–90	Halifax Citadels	AHL	47	20	17	37	44	—	—	—	—	—
1989–90	Quebec Nordiques	NHL	11	1	5	6	8	—	—	—	—	—
1990–91	Halifax Citadels	AHL	46	26	22	48	37	—	—	—	—	—
1990–91	Quebec Nordiques	NHL	34	3	4	7	10	—	—	—	—	—
1991–92	Halifax Citadels	AHL	44	21	18	39	39	—	—	—	—	—
1991–92	Quebec Nordiques	NHL	10	1	0	1	8	—	—	—	—	—
1992–93	Halifax Citadels	AHL	67	42	37	79	32	—	—	—	—	—
1993–94	Las Vegas Thunder	IHL	77	22	38	60	61	4	0	0	0	2
NHL totals			67	5	13	18	33	—	—	—	—	—

== Awards and honours ==
Award	Year
All-CCHA First Team	1987–88
AHCA West First-Team All-American	1987–88

Awards and achievements
Preceded by Wayne Gagné	CCHA Player of the Year; 1987-88	Succeeded by Bruce Hoffort
