= Bruce Hoffort =

Canadian ice hockey player

- Born: July 30, 1966 (age 58); Estevan, Saskatchewan, Canada
- Height: 6 ft 0 in (183 cm)
- Weight: 185 lb (84 kg; 13 st 3 lb)
- Position: Goaltender
- Caught: Left
- Played for: Philadelphia Flyers
- NHL draft: Undrafted
- Playing career: 1989–1992

Bruce W. Hoffort (born July 30, 1966) is a Canadian retired professional ice hockey goaltender. He played in 9 games in the National Hockey League (NHL) with the Philadelphia Flyers during the 1989–90 and 1990–91 seasons, which is the most games played by an NHL goaltender without registering a loss. The rest of his career, which lasted from 1989 to 1992, was spent in the minor leagues. Prior to turning professional Hoffort was a member of the Lake Superior State Lakers 1988 NCAA Championship men's ice hockey team.

== Career statistics ==
=== Regular season and playoffs ===
			Regular season									Playoffs
Season	Team	League	GP	W	L	T	MIN	GA	SO	GAA	SV%	GP	W	L	MIN	GA	SO	GAA	SV%
1985–86	Melville Millionaires	SJHL	40	15	18	2	2198	167	2	4.56	—	4	0	3	196	23	0	7.04	—
1986–87	Melville Millionaires	SJHL	47	—	—	—	—	—	—	4.41	—	—	—	—	—	—	—	—	—
1987–88	Lake Superior State University	CCHA	31	23	4	3	1787	79	2	2.65	.864	—	—	—	—	—	—	—	—
1988–89	Lake Superior State University	CCHA	44	27	10	5	2595	117	0	2.71	.894	—	—	—	—	—	—	—	—
1989–90	Philadelphia Flyers	NHL	7	3	0	2	329	19	0	3.47	.881	—	—	—	—	—	—	—	—
1989–90	Hershey Bears	AHL	40	16	18	4	2284	139	1	3.65	.886	—	—	—	—	—	—	—	—
1990–91	Philadelphia Flyers	NHL	2	1	0	1	40	3	0	4.59	.850	—	—	—	—	—	—	—	—
1990–91	Hershey Bears	AHL	18	3	12	1	913	74	0	4.86	.853	—	—	—	—	—	—	—	—
1990–91	Kansas City Blades	IHL	18	6	7	0	883	68	0	4.62	—	—	—	—	—	—	—	—	—
1991–92	San Diego Gulls	IHL	26	11	9	4	1474	89	0	3.62	—	—	—	—	—	—	—	—	—
NHL totals			9	4	0	3	368	23	0	3.75	.872	—	—	—	—	—	—	—	—

== Awards and honours ==
Award	Year
All-CCHA First Team	1987–88
All-NCAA All-Tournament Team	1988
NCAA Tournament MVP	1988
All-CCHA First Team	1988–89
AHCA West First-Team All-American	1988–89

Awards and achievements
Preceded by Tony Hrkac	NCAA Tournament Most Outstanding Player; 1988	Succeeded by Ted Donato
Preceded by Mark Vermette	CCHA Player of the Year; 1988–89	Succeeded by Kip Miller
