= Peter Lappin =

American ice hockey player (born 1965)

- Born: December 31, 1965 (age 59); St. Charles, Illinois, U S.
- Height: 5 ft 11 in (180 cm)
- Weight: 185 lb (84 kg; 13 st 3 lb)
- Position: Right wing
- Shot: Right
- Played for: Minnesota North Stars; San Jose Sharks
- NHL draft: 1987 NHL Supplemental Draft; Calgary Flames
- Playing career: 1987–1992

Peter John Lappin (born December 31, 1965) is an American former professional ice hockey player who played for the Minnesota North Stars and San Jose Sharks of the NHL. Prior to his professional career, he served as co-captain of the St. Lawrence University Skating Saints. His son Nick plays within the St. Louis Blues organization

== Career statistics ==
=== Regular season and playoffs ===
| | | | Regular season | | | | | Playoffs |
| Season | Team | League | GP | G | A | Pts | PIM | GP | G | A | Pts | PIM |
|---|---|---|---|---|---|---|---|---|---|---|---|---|
| 1984–85 | St. Lawrence University | ECAC | 32 | 10 | 12 | 22 | 22 | — | — | — | — | — |
| 1985–86 | St. Lawrence University | ECAC | 30 | 20 | 26 | 46 | 64 | — | — | — | — | — |
| 1986–87 | St. Lawrence University | ECAC | 35 | 34 | 35 | 59 | 32 | — | — | — | — | — |
| 1987–88 | St. Lawrence University | ECAC | 34 | 21 | 39 | 60 | 30 | — | — | — | — | — |
| 1987–88 | Salt Lake Golden Eagles | IHL | 3 | 1 | 1 | 2 | 0 | 17 | 16 | 12 | 28 | 11 |
| 1988–89 | Salt Lake Golden Eagles | IHL | 81 | 48 | 42 | 90 | 50 | 14 | 9 | 9 | 18 | 4 |
| 1989–90 | Kalamazoo Wings | IHL | 74 | 45 | 35 | 80 | 42 | 8 | 5 | 4 | 9 | 8 |
| 1989–90 | Minnesota North Stars | NHL | 6 | 0 | 0 | 0 | 2 | — | — | — | — | — |
| 1990–91 | Kalamazoo Wings | IHL | 73 | 20 | 47 | 67 | 74 | 11 | 5 | 4 | 9 | 8 |
| 1991–92 | Kansas City Blades | IHL | 78 | 28 | 30 | 58 | 41 | 4 | 2 | 1 | 3 | 0 |
| 1991–92 | San Jose Sharks | NHL | 1 | 0 | 0 | 0 | 0 | — | — | — | — | — |
| IHL totals | | | 309 | 142 | 155 | 297 | 207 | 54 | 37 | 28 | 65 | 27 |
| NHL totals | | | 7 | 0 | 0 | 0 | 2 | — | — | — | — | — |

== Awards and honors ==
| Award | Year |
|---|---|
| All-ECAC Hockey Second team | 1986–87 |
| AHCA East Second-Team All-American | 1986–87 |
| All-ECAC Hockey First Team | 1987–88 |
| AHCA East First-Team All-American | 1987–88 |
| All-NCAA All-Tournament Team | 1988 |

Awards and achievements
| Preceded by Joe Nieuwendyk | ECAC Hockey Player of the Year; 1987–88 | Succeeded by Lane MacDonald |
| Preceded by Lane MacDonald | ECAC Hockey Most Outstanding Player in Tournament; 1988 | Succeeded by Doug Murray |
