= Lake Superior State Lakers men's ice hockey =

Men's ice hockey team

- Current season
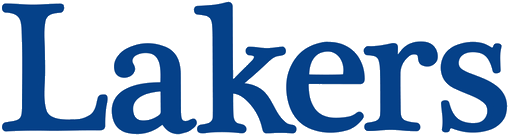
- University: Lake Superior State University
- Conference: CCHA
- Head coach: Damon Whitten; 13th season, 166–240–36 (.416)
- Assistant coaches: Mike York; D. J. Goldstein; Ryan Shelley
- Arena: Taffy Abel Arena; Sault Ste. Marie, Michigan
- Colors: Royal blue and gold

NCAA tournament champions
- 1988, 1992, 1994

NCAA tournament runner-up
- 1993 (Note: The NCAA later sent LSSU a commemorative award plaque declaring the Lakers the 1993 Men's Ice Hockey National Champion.)

NCAA tournament Frozen Four
- 1988, 1992, 1993, 1994

NCAA tournament appearances
- 1985, 1988, 1989, 1990, 1991, 1992, 1993, 1994, 1995, 1996, 2021

NAIA tournament champions
- 1972, 1974

Conference tournament champions
- CCHA: 1991, 1992, 1993, 1995; WCHA: 2021

Conference regular season champions
- ICHA: 1968, 1970, 1972, 1973; CCHA: 1974, 1988, 1991, 1996

Current uniform

The Lake Superior State Lakers men's ice hockey team is a National Collegiate Athletic Association (NCAA) Division I college ice hockey program that represents Lake Superior State University. The Lakers are a member of the Central Collegiate Hockey Association (CCHA). They play at the Taffy Abel Arena in Sault Ste. Marie, Michigan.

== History ==
=== The NAIA era ===
Lake Superior State College (LSSC) began a men's ice hockey program in 1966 as a member of the NAIA, under coach Ron Mason. The Lakers won the program's first two games with two straight 7–0 shutouts of the VFW Chippewas. The shutout and win streak continued through the team's third game when LSSC won 2–0 against the Sault (Ont.) Rapids. The Lakers finished their inaugural season 15–5–0.

The Lakers joined the International Collegiate Hockey Association (ICHA) its second season and stayed in the league through the 1973–74 season. The Lakers swept their first league series in program history with two high scoring games against Lakehead, winning 9–4 on November 18, 1967 and 8–6 the following night. The pattern continued as Lake Superior swept through the regular season and advanced to the programs first ever post-season tournament appearance in the 1968 NAIA Ice Hockey Tournament. The Lakers won their first ever playoff game in decisive fashion with a 7–1 win over Gustavus Adolphus. Lake Superior's run was ended in the 1968 NAIA Championship game when they lost to Bemidji State 4–5. History repeated itself the following season when Lake Superior again fell to Bemidji in the 1969 NAIA Championship 5–6. The Lakers finished the 1968–69 season with a record of 21–5–1 and the only losses coming at the hands of the Beavers. In the 1969–70 season, the Lakers again advanced through the ICHA regular season and the ICHA to the 1970 NAIA Tournament. Lake Superior advanced to the championship game against Bemidji State for the third straight season with a dominating 22–3 win over Alaska Methodist. The Lakers fell to Bemidji State 4–7, the third straight loss to Bemidji State in the NAIA Championship game.

The 1970–71 season marked the first season since joining the NAIA that the Lakers failed to make the NAIA tournament, finishing the season with a record of 13–9–4. The Lakers joined the Central Collegiate Hockey Association (CCHA) as one of the founding members of the league in 1971 and began play in the CCHA for the 1972–73 season. Lake Superior also remained in the ICHA and NAIA. The Lakers picked up their first CCHA victory on November 4, 1972 when they beat Saint Louis 7–3. The team qualified for the NAIA Championship Tournament, defeating Wisconsin State 12–2 and Gustavus Adolphus 9–3 to win the program's first ever National Championship. Lake Superior fell to Lakehead in the 1973 NAIA Championship Tournament, marking the Lakers' first post season loss not in the Championship game, but rebounded the next day with an 11–3 win over Gustavus Adolphus for the NAIA Third Place game. Following the 1972–73 season Ron Mason left to become the head coach at Bowling Green. Mason would be replaced by Rick Comley.

The 1973–74 season marked a historic year for the Lakers ice hockey program. Lake Superior State finished the regular season and qualified for the 1974 NAIA Championship Tournament. The Lakers advanced to the NAIA Final Four with a 7–1 victory over Concordia College (MN), then picked up a decisive 9–2 win over St. Thomas to advance into the NAIA Championship against rival Bemidji State. The Lakers won their second NAIA Championship with a 4–1 victory over the Beavers. The championship was not the end of the season, as the Lakers also received a bid to the CCHA Tournament. Lake Superior won their first ever CCHA playoff game against Western Michigan, but fell in the CCHA Championship to Saint Louis 3–8. The Lakers also advanced to the National Invitational Tournament held in Saint Louis, Missouri but fell 2–3 to Vermont and 1–9 to CCHA rival Saint Louis. The 1973–74 also marked LSSC's last season as a member of the NAIA for ice hockey.

=== First championship under Anzalone ===
Frank Anzalone took over mid-season in 1983 after a period of mediocrity over the previous several seasons. Under Anzalone, LSSC would turn around from an 11th-place CCHA finish to second in the CCHA two seasons later in 1984–85. The Lakers advanced to the CCHA Championship with a win over Bowling Green, but lost to Michigan State 5–1 at Joe Louis Arena in Detroit, Michigan. Despite the second place CCHA finish, LSSC qualified for the 1985 NCAA tournament, the school's first ever NCAA Tournament appearance for ice hockey. Lake Superior fell to RPI 7–3 in the first of the three game series and came up short with a 3–3 tie in the second game. RPI would go on in the tournament to become the National Champions.

Two seasons later in the 1987–88 season, Anzalone led the Lakers to the teams' first 30-win season. Lake Superior State College, now Lake Superior State University (LSSU), won the CCHA Regular Season Championship, but finished as the CCHA Tournament Runner-Up with a 5–3 loss to Bowling Green. Lake State advanced to the NCAA Tournament and outscored Merrimack by a combined score of 9–3 in two games and advanced to the Frozen Four against Maine. The Lakers came away with a 6–3 win, giving LSSU their first ever appearance in the NCAA Championship game. Lake Superior took on St. Lawrence in the championship and won their first NCAA National Championship with a score of 4–3, thanks to Mark Vermette's overtime goal that gave the Lakers the win. Laker goalie Bruce Hoffort was named the Most Outstanding Player of the 1988 Frozen Four. Lake Superior State University is the smallest school in NCAA history to win a Division I national championship in men's ice hockey.

Lake Superior received at-large bids the following two season in 1989 and 1990, but their championship hopes ended in the first round with back-to-back first round losses at the hands of Harvard and Colgate. Following the 1989–90 season and the NCAA first round loss to Colgate, Anzalone left to coach the Newmarket Saints of the AHL.

=== Continued success under Jackson ===
Following Anzalone's departure, Jeff Jackson took over the program and continued the winning tradition of the Lakers. In his first season as head coach at Lake Superior, Jackson led the team to a CCHA Regular Season Championship and CCHA Tournament Championship through a tough 6–5 overtime win over Michigan. The CCHA Championship gave LSSU an automatic bid to the 1991 NCAA Tournament where the team would lose its first round series against Clarkson. In Jackson's second season, the 1991–1992 Lakers would finish 20–8–4 in the CCHA, good enough for 2nd in the final standings behind Michigan. The Lakers swept UIC 2-0 in the Soo to advance to Detroit for the CCHA Finals. After knocking off Michigan State 5–3, the Lakers would win their second straight CCHA Playoff Championship, in a rematch of the previous season, with a 3–1 win over Michigan. Lake Superior advanced through the NCAA Tournament with wins over Alaska-Anchorage, Minnesota, and in-state CCHA rival Michigan State. Lake Superior won their second NCAA Championship with a 5–3 win over Wisconsin.

The 1992–1993 Lakers went 32–8–5 and finished 3rd place in the CCHA. In the CCHA playoffs, the Lakers again swept UIC in the Soo behind Rob Valicevic's 4 goals. In Detroit, the Lakers destroyed Bowling Green 7–1, again paced by Valicevic's hat-trick. In the semifinals, the Lakers and Wolverines would square off. Behind Wayne Strachan's hat-trick and 19 saves by Blaine Lacher, the Lakers knocked off Michigan, 5–3. The Lakers would win the CCHA Title for a third straight season with a 3-0 shutout of CCHA Regular Season Champion Miami (OH), and advanced to the NCAA Tournament. In the West Regional in Detroit, the Lakers would open up with Minnesota-Duluth. With the game tied at 1–1, the Lakers' Brian Rolston scored two goals in 59-seconds to give LSSU the lead for good in a 4–3 victory. The win over Minnesota-Duluth sent the Lakers to their second straight Frozen Four. In the national semifinal, played in Milwaukee, the Lakers faced off with perennial powerhouse, Boston University. The Lakers jumped out to a 2–0 first period lead behind goals by Kurt Miller and Brian Rolston, and never looked back as they knocked off the Terriers 6–1. In the 1993 NCAA Championship game, the Lakers would face the Maine Black Bears, led by future NHL star Paul Kariya and Maine's all-time leading scorer Jim Montgomery. Maine's Patrice Tardif and Chris Ferraro gave Maine a 2–1 lead after the first period. The Lakers roared back in the second period with goals from Clayton Beddoes, John Hendry, and Wayne Strachan to take a 4–2 lead after two periods, however, Montgomery's natural hat-trick in the 3rd period gave the Black Bears a 5–4 lead. In the closing moments of the 3rd period, the Lakers' Sean Tallaire made a shot toward the net which was not ruled as a goal. Tallaire said he scored to tie the game 5–5 with 50 seconds left. Jeff Jackson recounted the event saying that Tallaire returned to the team's bench and exclaimed, "That puck was in, Coach!" The NCAA did not yet have video review, and the game's official result ended with Maine winning 5–4. Jackson would later obtain film from the game and said that "Every time I watched the clip, I noticed something was weird. So I kept on rewinding it back on the old VHS systems and trying to determine. You couldn’t see the puck go in the net. But what I did see was the skate lace tying down the water bottle on the top of the net, flying in the air. That’s when I knew the puck had gone in.” Later, high quality film of this moment was broadcast during a November 1993 game involving Lake Superior State and Vermont that appeared to show it was indeed a goal scored by Tallaire to tie the 1993 Championship Game. Curiously, the NCAA actually sent Jeff Jackson a commemorative award plaque honoring Lake Superior State University as the 1993 Men's Ice Hockey National Champions. Jackson believes this was possibly due to sanctions that the Maine hockey program received in 1993 for recruiting violations. Brian Rolston and Michael Smith were named to the all-tournament team.

The 1993–1994 season began as a potential rebuilding season for Coach Jackson and the Lakers. With a line-up that included 12 freshman, very few people outside of Sault Ste. Marie expected the Lakers to make a third straight trip to the Frozen Four. However, the Lakers put together a 31–10–4 regular season and a 2nd place CCHA finish with an 18–8–4 record. Lake Superior State lost the 1994 CCHA Championship game 3–0 to Michigan, but the Lakers received an at-large bid to the 1994 Tournament. The underdog Lakers would play in the West Regional in East Lansing, Michigan. In the opener, the Lakers played in one of the most controversial NCAA regional games in history against Northeastern. Late in the 3rd period, and the game deadlocked at 5–5, Northeastern's Dan Lupo appeared the give the Huskies a 6–5 lead. However, the officials ruled that the entire puck had not crossed the goal line, thus negating the potential go ahead goal. The Lakers won the game, 6–5, with an overtime winner just 15 seconds into the extra frame. In the second game of the NCAA Regional, the Lakers again matched up with the Michigan Wolverines, a team who had won both the CCHA Regular Season and Playoff Championships and had beaten the Lakers four times during the season. The Lakers and Wolverines would play to a 4–4 score at the end of regulation, with the Lakers upsetting Michigan 5–4 in overtime. In the national semifinals, played in St. Paul, Minnesota, the Lakers again won in overtime, this time beating Harvard 3–2. The streak of overtime games was snapped in St. Paul, Minnesota when the Lakers exploded to a 9–1 win over Boston University to win the program's third NCAA Division I Men's Hockey Title.

Jeff Jackson would coach the Lakers for two more seasons, making the NCAA Tournament in both 1995 and 1996. The team would lose in Regional Final games both seasons against Boston University in a rematch of the 1994 Championship and to Vermont in 1996. This would be the Lakers' final appearance in the NCAA tournament for 25 years. Jackson stepped down as head coach of Lake Superior to become the national coach and senior director of the newly founded U.S. National Team Development Program in Ann Arbor, Michigan. Anzalone and Jackson combined to lead to the program to an impressive run, with Lake Superior appearing in the NCAA Tournament for nine consecutive seasons. Those nine seasons included three NCAA Division I Championships and one runner-up spot.

=== Modern era ===
Lake Superior returned to a cool period after Jackson left the program. After five lackluster seasons under head coach Scott Borek, Frank Anzalone returned to the program in 2001, but hopes that the program would be turned around to its former glory faded after four seasons where the Lakers failed to reach the 10-win mark. Former Laker Jim Roque became coach in 2005 and, in his second season, led the Lakers to the team's first 20-win season since 1996. In 2010 the university announced a $5 million project to renovate and expand the James Norris Center, the athletic and recreational facility that houses Taffy Abel Arena. The renovations included expansion of areas around the LSSU hockey locker room, with expanded coaches offices and spaces, a training room, equipment room, and athletic training offices.

In the summer of 2011, the Big Ten Conference announced intentions to begin sponsoring men's ice hockey in 2013, leading to the creation of the NCHC and a large re-alignment within college hockey. With numerous WCHA and CCHA members leaving for the NCHC, the CCHA collapsed and the WCHA sent invitations to the five remaining CCHA schools. The Lakers quickly accepted their invitation to join the WCHA for the 2013–14 season.

In 2014, after obtaining only three winning seasons in nine years, Roque was let go. Damon Whitten was named the 10th head coach of the Lakers in April 2014. In 2018–19, in Whitten's fifth season as LSSU's coach, the Lakers won 23 games, which was Lake State's first season with over 20 wins since 2006–07 and the most wins the program had seen in a single season since 1995-96. Whitten also guided the Lakers to their first ever Great Lakes Invitational championship in program history on New Year's Eve in 2018.

In 2019, Lake Superior State was one of seven members of the men's WCHA that announced that they would be leaving the WCHA to form a new, revived CCHA conference. The 2020–21 season would be the last for the current iteration of the WCHA, and the Lakers made it a season to remember. Whitten's Lakers finished second in the WCHA regular season, the school's best conference performance since 1995–96 and were consistently ranked in the top 20 throughout the end of the season. In March 2021, the Lakers reached a milestone of 1,000 wins in program history. The Lakers made it all the way to the championship game of the 2021 WCHA tournament, where they faced off against Northern Michigan. The Lakers would win in a decisive 6–3 game to claim their first conference tournament championship in 25 years. As the winner of the WCHA tournament, the Lakers secured an automatic bid to the 2021 NCAA Tournament, ending their 25-year absence from the national tournament and earning their 11th appearance all-time. The Lakers would go on to lose to the eventual champion UMass by a score of 1–5 in the opening game.

The Lakers have struggled since re-joining the CCHA, often finishing towards the bottom of the revived league, however, in the 2024 CCHA Tournament, the 7th-seeded Lakers posted a surprising upset, beating 2nd-seeded St. Thomas in three games in the opening series of the playoffs. In 2025, the Lakers secured a substantial annually recurring $1.5 million donation from an anonymous donor to help enhance team operations and recruit top talent.

== Coaches ==
=== All-time coaching records ===
As of the completion of 2025–26 season

Tenure	Coach	Years	Record	Pct.
1966–1973	Ron Mason	7	130–44–8	.736
1973–1976	Rick Comley	3	59–46–3	.560
1976–1981	Rick Yeo	5	70–96–5	.424
1981–1982	Bill Selman	2†	26–30–3	.466
1982–1990, 2001–2005	Frank Anzalone	12	223–205–42	.519
1990–1996	Jeff Jackson	6	182–52–25	.751
1996–2001	Scott Borek	5	76–94–15	.451
2005–2014	Jim Roque	9	136–165–46	.458
2014–present	Damon Whitten	12	166–240–36	.416
Totals	9 coaches	60 seasons	1068–972–183	.522

† Bill Selman resigned in December 1982.

== Awards and honors ==
=== US Hockey Hall of Fame ===
United States Hockey Hall of Fame members include:

- Ron Mason (2013)
- Doug Weight (2013)

=== NCAA ===
Spencer Penrose Award

- Frank Anzalone: 1988

Tournament Most Outstanding Player

- Bruce Hoffort: 1988
- Paul Constantin: 1992
- Sean Tallaire: 1994

AHCA First Team All-Americans

- 1987-88: Mark Vermette, F
- 1988-89: Bruce Hoffort, G; Kord Cernich, D
- 1990-91: Darrin Madeley, G; Jim Dowd, F
- 1991-92: Darrin Madeley, G; Mark Astley, D
- 1995-96: Keith Aldridge, D

AHCA Second Team All-Americans

- 1989-90: Kord Cernich, D; Jim Dowd, F
- 1990-91: Karl Johnston, D; Doug Weight, F
- 1992-93: Michael Smith, D; Brian Rolston, F
- 1993-94: Clayton Beddoes, F
- 1994-95: Keith Aldridge, D
- 1995-96: Sean Tallaire, F
- 1999-00: Jayme Platt, G

=== WCHA ===
==== Individual awards ====
Rookie of the Year

- Alex Globke: 2014

Most Outstanding Player in Tournament

- Ashton Calder: 2021

==== All-Conference Teams ====
First Team All-WCHA

- 2013–14: Kevin Czuczman, D
- 2016–17: Mitch Hults, F
- 2018–19: Diego Cuglietta, F

Second team all-wcha

- 2013–14: Kevin Kapalka, G
- 2015–16: Gordon Defiel, G
- 2019–20: Max Humitz, F
- 2020–21: Mareks Mitens, G; Ashton Calder, F

Third Team All-WCHA

- 2018–19: Max Humitz, F; Anthony Nellis, F
- 2020–21: Pete Veillette, F

WCHA All-Rookie Team

- 2013–14: Alex Globke, F
- 2016–17: Max Humitz, F
- 2019–20: Louis Boudon, F

=== CCHA ===
==== Individual awards ====
Player of the Year

- Mark Vermette: 1988
- Bruce Hoffort: 1989
- Jim Dowd: 1991

Rookie of the Year

- Steve Mulholland: 1980

Coach of the Year

- Frank Anzalone: 1988
- Jeff Jackson: 1991
- Scott Borek: 2000

Terry Flanagan Memorial Award

- Steve McJannet: 2006
- Domenic Monardo: 2012

Best Defensive Forward

- Pete Stauber: 1990
- Jeff Napierala: 1991
- Wayne Strachan: 1995
- Bates Battaglia: 1996
- Terry Marchant: 1998

Best Offensive Defenseman

- Mark Astley: 1992
- Keith Aldridge: 1996

Best Defensive Defenseman

- Dan Keczmer: 1990
- Karl Johnston: 1991
- Mike Matteucci: 1996

Tournament Most Valuable Player

- Clayton Beddoes: 1991
- Darrin Madeley: 1992
- Blaine Lacher: 1993
- Wayne Strachan: 1995

Perani Cup

- Jeff Jakaitis: 2006

Ilitch Humanitarian Award

- Bo Cheesman: 2005

==== All-Conference Teams ====
First Team All-CCHA

- 1972–73: Bill Slewidge, D
- 1973–74: Pat Tims, G; Tom Davies, D; Kim Gellert, F
- 1987–88: Bruce Hoffort, G; Mark Vermette, F
- 1988–89: Bruce Hoffort, G; Kord Cernich, D
- 1989–90: Kord Cernich, D
- 1990–91: Darrin Madeley, G; Karl Johnston, D; Jim Dowd, F; Doug Weight, F
- 1991–92: Darrin Madeley, G; Mark Astley, D
- 1992–93: Brian Rolston, F
- 1994–95: Keith Aldridge, D
- 1995–96: Keith Aldridge, D; Sean Tallaire, F
- 1999–00: Jayme Platt, G
- 2005–06: Jeff Jakaitis, G
- 2023–24: Jared Westcott, F

Second team all-ccha

- 1972–73: Don Muio, G; Julio Francella, F
- 1973–74: Bill Slewidge, D
- 1974–75: Marc Gaudreault, D; Mike Gaba, F; Julio Francella, F
- 1975–76: Mike Gaba, F; Kim Gellert, F
- 1976–77: Pat Tims, G
- 1978–79: Murray Skinner, G; Ron Sandzik, F
- 1979–80: Steve Mulholland, F
- 1984–85: Allan Butler, F
- 1987–88: Kord Cernich, D; Mike de Carle, F
- 1989–90: Darrin Madeley, G; Dan Keczmer, D; Jim Dowd, F
- 1990–91: Mark Astley, D
- 1991–92: Steven Barnes, D; Sandy Moger, F
- 1992–93: Michael Smith, D
- 1993–94: Keith Aldridge, D; Clayton Beddoes, F
- 1994–95: Joe Blaznek, F; Jason Sessa, F
- 1997–98: Terry Marchant, F
- 2006–07: Jeff Jakaitis, G; Derek Smith, D
- 2021–22: Jacob Bengtsson, D; Louis Boudon, F
- 2023–24: Connor Milburn, F

CCHA All-Rookie Team

- 1989–90: Darrin Madeley, G; Doug Weight, F
- 1990–91: Steven Barnes, D; Clayton Beddoes, F
- 1992–93: Sean Tallaire, F
- 2010–11: Kevin Kapalka, G
- 2021–22: Josh Nixon, F
- 2023–24: John Herrington, F
- 2024–25: Rorke Applebee, G

== Statistical leaders ==
=== Career points leaders ===
Player	Years	GP	G	A	Pts	PIM
Jim Dowd	1987–1991	181	91	183	274	139
Julio Francella	1971–1975	121	68	144	212	
Randy McArthur	1966–1970	87	113	95	208	
Sean Tallaire	1992–1996	171	103	104	207	122
Steve Mulholland	1979–1983	142	95	111	206	134
Clayton Beddoes	1990–1994	176	71	127	198	136
Mike de Carle	1985–1989	155	94	101	195	331
Pete Stauber	1986–1990	177	97	90	187	388
Steve Sherman	1978–1982	136	76	101	177	82
Allan Butler	1981–1985	158	83	92	175	38

=== Career goaltending leaders ===
GP = Games played; Min = Minutes played; W = Wins; L = Losses; T = Ties; GA = Goals against; SO = Shutouts; SV% = Save percentage; GAA = Goals against average

Minimum 1000 minutes

Player	Years	GP	Min	W	L	T	GA	SO	SV%	GAA
Darrin Madeley	1989–1992	100	5727	71	16	8	225	4	.908	2.36
Jeff Jakaitis	2003–2007	123	7072	40	58	18	281	10	.925	2.38
Blaine Lacher	1991–1994	73	4110	49	13	7	167	8	.901	2.44
Mareks Mitens	2017–2021	94	5138	36	42	9	215	6	.914	2.51
Kevin Kapalka	2010–2014	111	6320	45	44	15	273	2	.921	2.59

Statistics current through the start of the 2021-22 season.

== Lake Superior State Athletic Hall of Fame ==
The following is a list of people associated with the Lake Superior State men's ice hockey program who were elected into the Lake Superior State Athletic Hall of Fame (induction date in parentheses).

- Rick Comley (1996)
- Archie Orazietti (1996)
- Ron Mason (1996)
- Randy McArthur (1996)
- Jim Booth (1997)
- James Wiley (1997)
- Steve Mulholland (1998)
- Chris Dahlquist (1999)
- Tom Davies (2000)
- Julio Francella (2000)
- 1971–72 Team (2001)
- Frank Anzalone (2001)
- Bill Slewidge (2002)
- Pat Tims (2003)
- 1973–74 Team (2003)
- 1987–88 Team (2005)
- Jeff Jackson (2009)
- Bill Crawford (2009)
- Jim Dowd (2010)
- Doug Weight (2010)
- 1991–92 Team (2012)
- 1993–94 Team (2014)
- Mark Astley (2018)
- Darrin Madeley (2018)

== Players ==
=== Current roster ===
As of September 16, 2025.

No.	Nat.	Player	Class	Pos	Height	Weight	DoB	Hometown	Previous team	NHL rights
2	(Sweden)	Max Ranström	Freshman	D	5' 11" (1.8 m)	192 lb (87 kg)	2004-12-21	Filipstad, Sweden	Corpus Christi IceRays (NAHL)	—
3	(United States)	Mike Brown	Senior (RS)	D	6' 2" (1.88 m)	202 lb (92 kg)	2001-04-03	Belmont, Massachusetts	Merrimack (HEA)	—
4	(United States)	Luke Antonacci	Senior	D	5' 9" (1.75 m)	171 lb (78 kg)	2002-11-26	Princeton, New Jersey	Maine (HEA)	—
5	(United States)	Evan Bushy	Junior	D	6' 1" (1.85 m)	195 lb (88 kg)	2002-03-26	Mankato, Minnesota	Trail Smoke Eaters (BCHL)	—
6	(Canada)	Adam Barone	Sophomore	D	6' 1" (1.85 m)	174 lb (79 kg)	2004-05-06	Sault Ste. Marie, Ontario	Trail Smoke Eaters (BCHL)	—
7	(Canada)	Calem Mangone	Freshman	F	5' 9" (1.75 m)	165 lb (75 kg)	2004-11-04	Sault Ste. Marie, Ontario	Saginaw Spirit (OHL)	—
8	(United States)	Jack Blanchett	Junior	F	5' 11" (1.8 m)	185 lb (84 kg)	2003-05-12	Monroe, Michigan	Powell River Kings (BCHL)	—
10	(United States)	Sasha Teleguine	Senior	F	5' 10" (1.78 m)	180 lb (82 kg)	2002-09-17	North Attleborough, Massachusetts	Chilliwack Chiefs (BCHL)	—
11	(United States)	Carter Batchelder	Junior	F	5' 10" (1.78 m)	175 lb (79 kg)	2003-02-25	Savage, Minnesota	Des Moines Buccaneers (USHL)	—
13	(United States)	Wilson Dahlheimer	Sophomore	F	5' 9" (1.75 m)	172 lb (78 kg)	2003-10-09	Monticello, Minnesota	Muskegon Lumberjacks (USHL)	—
15	(Canada)	Sam Bélanger	Freshman	D	6' 4" (1.93 m)	229 lb (104 kg)	2004-05-31	Montréal, Quebec	Cranbrook Bucks (BCHL)	—
17	(United States)	Luke Levandowski	Junior	F	6' 0" (1.83 m)	165 lb (75 kg)	2002-09-26	Rosemount, Minnesota	Wisconsin Windigo (NAHL)	—
18	(United States)	Everett Pietila	Sophomore	F	5' 10" (1.78 m)	185 lb (84 kg)	2003-09-27	Howell, Michigan	Wisconsin Windigo (NAHL)	—
19	(Canada)	Connor Milburn	Senior	F	6' 4" (1.93 m)	180 lb (82 kg)	2001-04-11	Kamloops, British Columbia	Chilliwack Chiefs (BCHL)	—
21	(Canada)	Tyson Galloway	Sophomore	D	6' 4" (1.93 m)	205 lb (93 kg)	2003-01-20	Kamloops, British Columbia	Calgary (CWUAA)	STL, 145th overall 2021
22	(Canada)	Reagan Milburn	Junior	F	6' 0" (1.83 m)	190 lb (86 kg)	2003-02-13	Kamloops, British Columbia	Vernon Vipers (BCHL)	—
25	(United States)	Ryan Beck	Senior	F	5' 10" (1.78 m)	198 lb (90 kg)	2002-08-25	Linden, Michigan	Colorado College (NCHC)	—
26	(Canada)	John Herrington	Junior	D	5' 11" (1.8 m)	180 lb (82 kg)	2002-04-19	Hudson's Hope, British Columbia	Prince George Spruce Kings (BCHL)	—
28	(United States)	Hunter Ramos	Freshman	F	5' 9" (1.75 m)	161 lb (73 kg)	2005-05-09	Fort Wayne, Indiana	Waterloo Black Hawks (USHL)	—
29	(United States)	Andrew Oke	Freshman	G	6' 2" (1.88 m)	194 lb (88 kg)	2004-03-26	Shelby Township, Michigan	Saginaw Spirit (OHL)	—
33	(Canada)	Rorke Applebee	Sophomore	G	6' 0" (1.83 m)	170 lb (77 kg)	2003-09-19	Châteauguay, Quebec	West Kelowna Warriors (BCHL)	—
40	(United States)	Bryan Huggins	Senior	D	5' 11" (1.8 m)	180 lb (82 kg)	2002-03-26	Grand Rapids, Michigan	Fargo Force (USHL)	—
41	(Sweden)	William Ahlrik	Sophomore	F	6' 0" (1.83 m)	190 lb (86 kg)	2003-09-25	Tidaholm, Sweden	Oklahoma Warriors (NAHL)	—
43	(United States)	Hadley Hudak	Sophomore	F	6' 4" (1.93 m)	201 lb (91 kg)	2003-06-23	Canton, Michigan	Springfield Jr. Blues (NAHL)	—
53	(United States)	Johnny Druskinis	Junior	D	6' 1" (1.85 m)	185 lb (84 kg)	2002-04-10	Plymouth, Michigan	Michigan (Big Ten)	—
73	(Canada)	Adam Manji	Sophomore	G	6' 5" (1.96 m)	181 lb (82 kg)	2003-07-10	New Westminster, British Columbia	American International (AHA)	—
77	(United States)	Branden Piku	Junior	F	5' 8" (1.73 m)	165 lb (75 kg)	2002-08-25	Harrison Township, Michigan	Maryland Black Bears (NAHL)	—
81	(United States)	Blake Humphrey	Senior	F	5' 8" (1.73 m)	162 lb (73 kg)	2002-01-18	Syracuse, New York	Sacred Heart (AHA)	—
91	(Canada)	Pierson Sobush	Freshman	F	5' 9" (1.75 m)	170 lb (77 kg)	2004-06-07	Sudbury, Ontario	Corpus Christi IceRays (NAHL)	—
97	(Canada)	Matheson Mason	Freshman	F	6' 0" (1.83 m)	179 lb (81 kg)	2004-12-08	Toronto, Ontario	Spruce Grove Saints (BCHL)	—

== Olympians ==
This is a list of Lake Superior State alumni were a part of an Olympic team.

Name	Position	Lake Superior State Tenure	Team	Year	Finish
Mark Astley	Defenseman	1988–1992	(Canada) CAN	1994	Silver
Brian Rolston	Right wing	1991–1993	(United States) USA	1994, 2002, 2006	8th, Silver, 8th
Doug Weight	Center	1989–1991	(United States) USA	1998, 2002, 2006	6th, Silver, 8th
John Grahame	Goaltender	1994–1997	(United States) USA	2006	8th
Lukas Kälble	Defenseman	2017–2021	(Germany) GER	2026	6th
Louis Boudon	Center	2019–2023	(France) FRA	2026	11th

== Lakers in the NHL ==
As of July 1, 2025.

= NHL All-Star team	= NHL All-Star	= NHL All-Star and NHL All-Star team

Player	Position	Team(s)	Years	Games	Stanley Cups
Will Acton	Center	EDM	2013–2015	33	0
Keith Aldridge	Defenseman	DAL	1999–2000	4	0
Mark Astley	Defenseman	BUF	1993–1996	75	0
Bates Battaglia	Defenseman	CAR, COL, WSH, TOR	1997–2008	580	0
Clayton Beddoes	Center	BOS	1995–1997	60	0
Rene Chapdelaine	Defenseman	LAK	1990–1993	32	0
Kevin Czuczman	Defenseman	NYI, PIT	2013–2021	15	0
Chris Dahlquist	Defenseman	PIT, MNS, CGY, OTT	1985–1996	532	0
Jim Dowd	Center	NJD, VAN, NYI, EDM, MIN, MTL, CHI, COL, PHI	1990–2008	728	1
Randy Exelby	Goaltender	MTL, EDM	1988–1990	2	0
Brian Felsner	Left wing	CHI	1997–1998	12	0
John Flesch	Left wing	MNS, PIT, COR	1974–1980	124	0
John Grahame	Goaltender	BOS, TBL, CAR	1999–2008	224	1
Mike Greenlay	Goaltender	EDM	1989–1990	2	0
Bruce Hoffort	Goaltender	PHI	1989–1991	9	0
Paul Jerrard	Defenseman	MNS	1988–1989	5	0

Player	Position	Team(s)	Years	Games	Stanley Cups
Dan Keczmer	Defenseman	MNS, HFD, CGY, DAL, NSH	1990–2000	235	0
Blaine Lacher	Goaltender	BOS	1994–1996	47	0
Kellan Lain	Left wing	VAN	2013–2014	9	0
Darrin Madeley	Goaltender	OTT	1992–1995	39	0
Mike Matteucci	Defenseman	MIN	2000–2002	6	0
Sandy Moger	Right wing	BOS, LAK	1994–1999	236	0
Steven Oleksy	Defenseman	WSH, PIT	2012–2017	73	0
Buddy Robinson	Left wing	OTT, CGY, ANA, CHI	2015–2023	62	0
Brian Rolston	Left wing	NJD, COL, BOS, MIN, NYI	1994–2012	1,256	1
Derek Smith	Defenseman	OTT, CGY	2009–2014	94	0
Zach Trotman	Defenseman	BOS, PIT	2013–2020	91	0
Rob Valicevic	Right wing	NSH, LAK, ANA, DAL	1998–2003	193	0
Mark Vermette	Right wing	QUE	1988–1992	67	0
Doug Weight	Center	NYR, EDM, STL, STL, CAR, ANA, NYI	1991–2011	1,238	1
Jim Wiley	Center	PIT, VAN	1972–1977	63	0

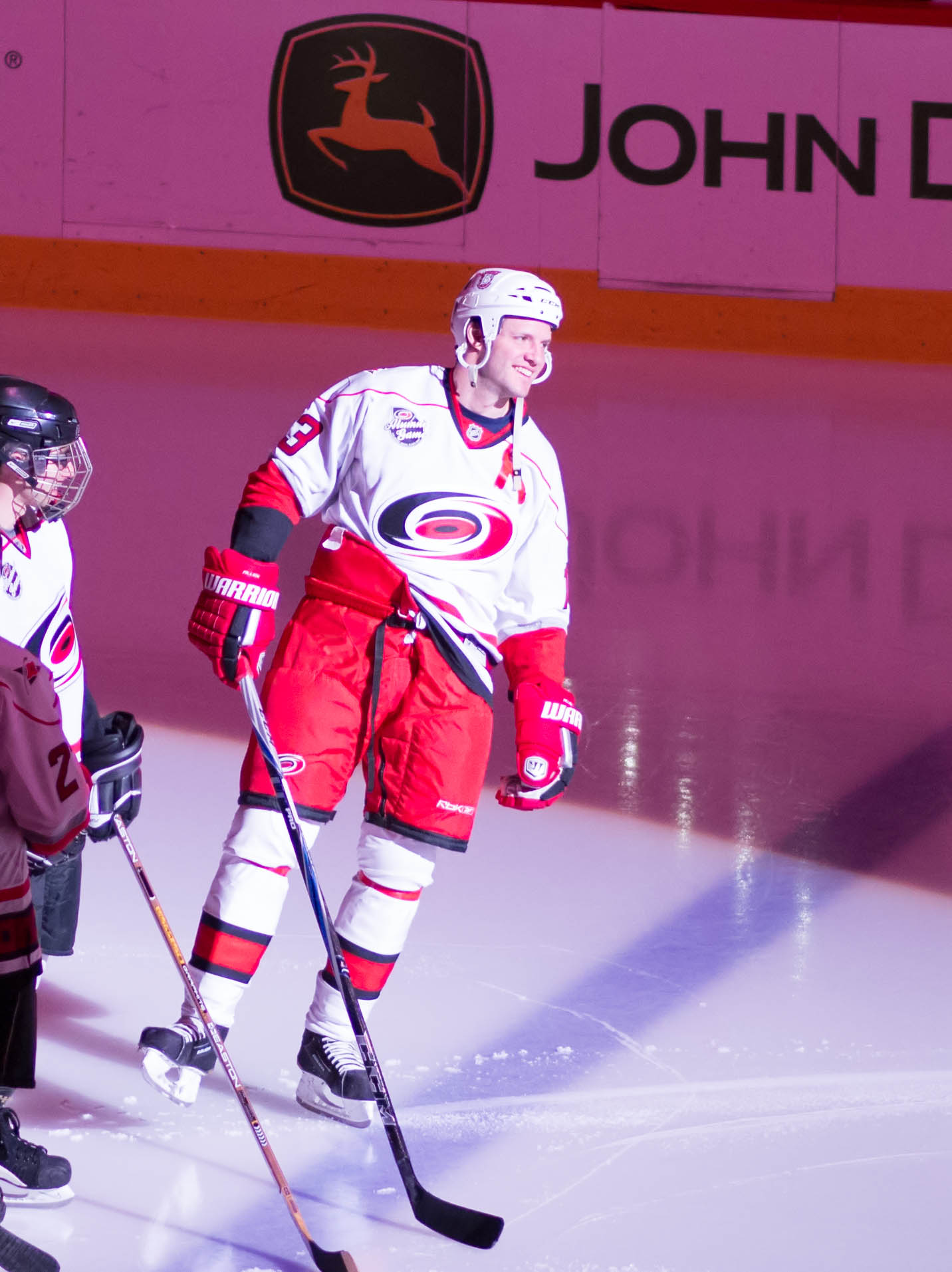
Bates Battaglia

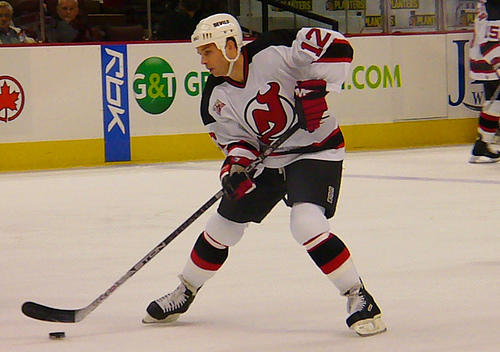
Jim Dowd

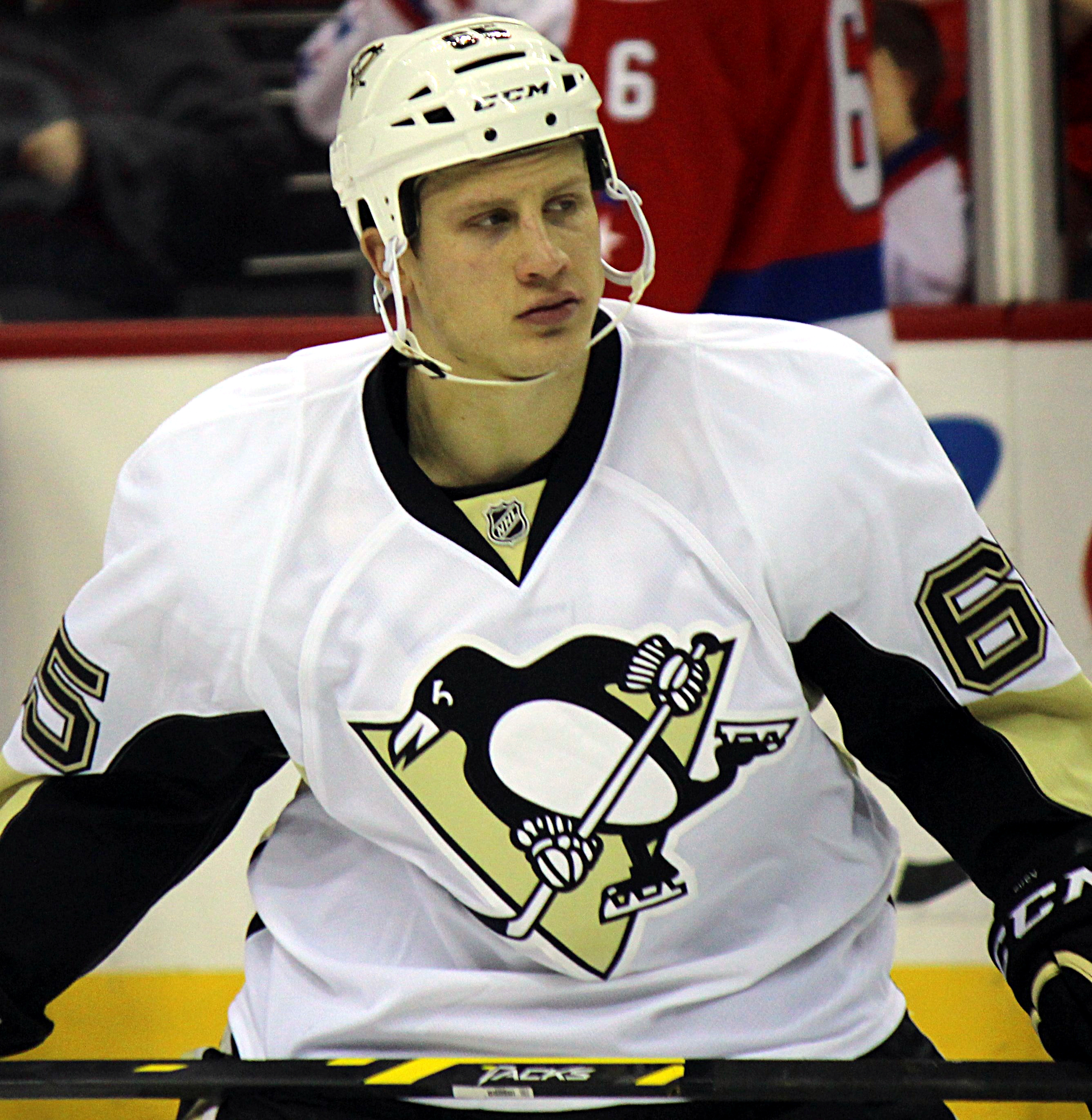
Steven Oleksy

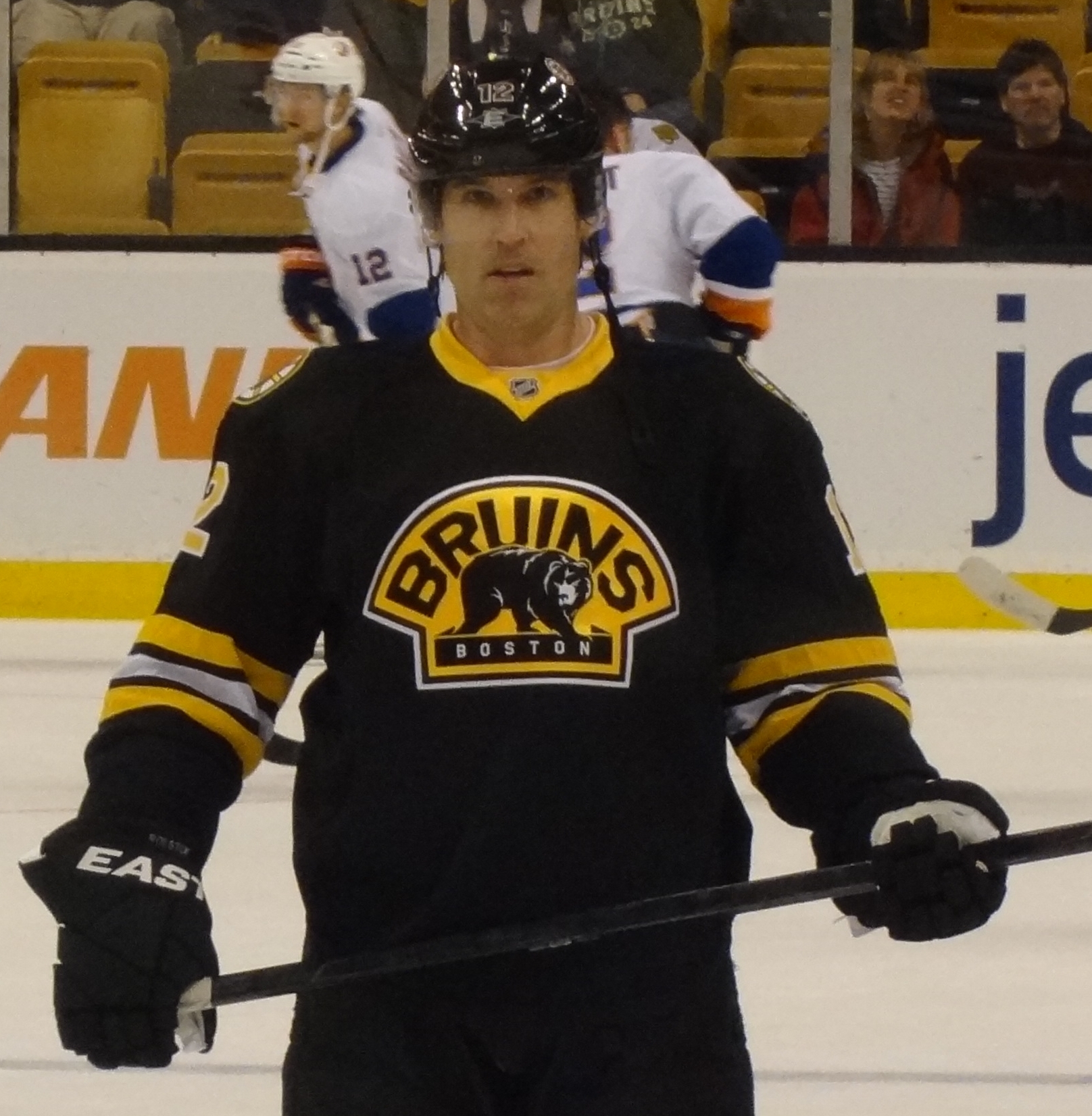
Brian Rolston

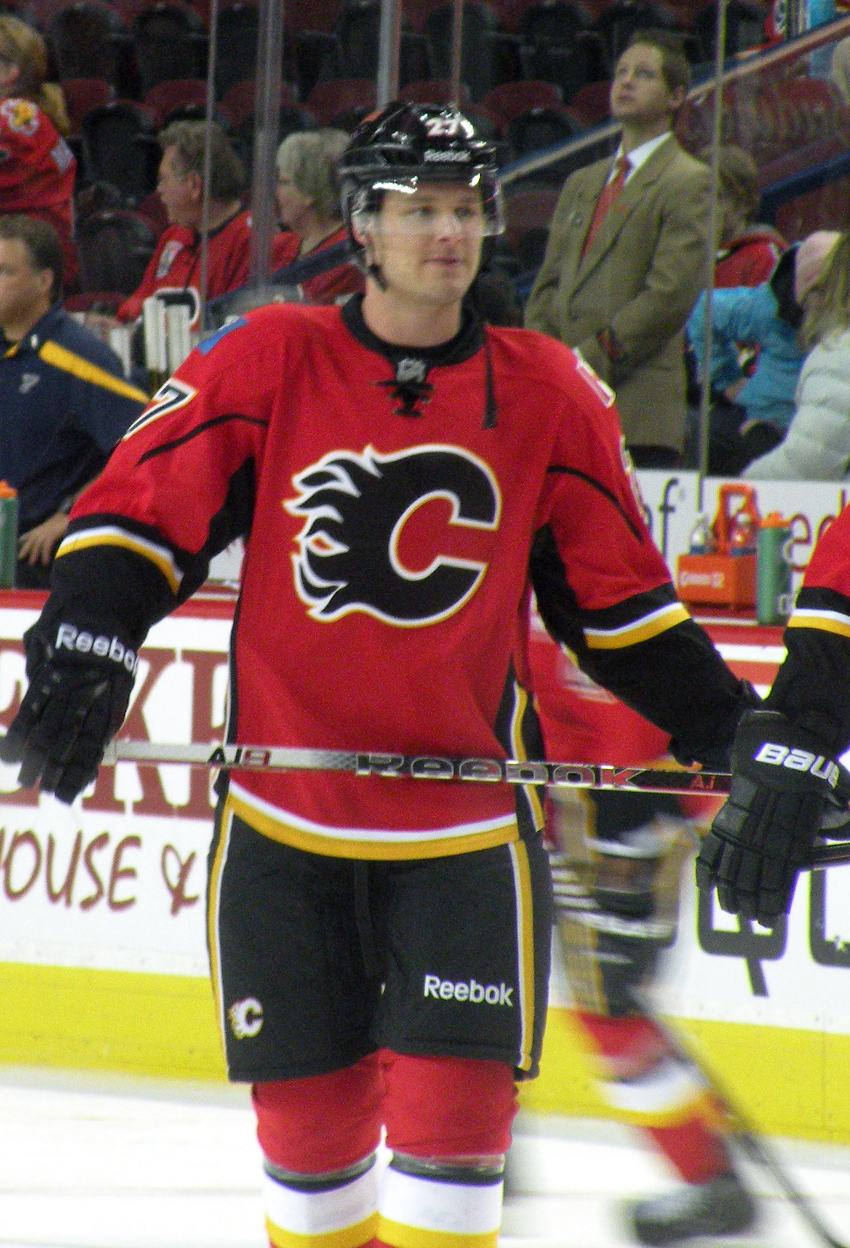
Derek Smith

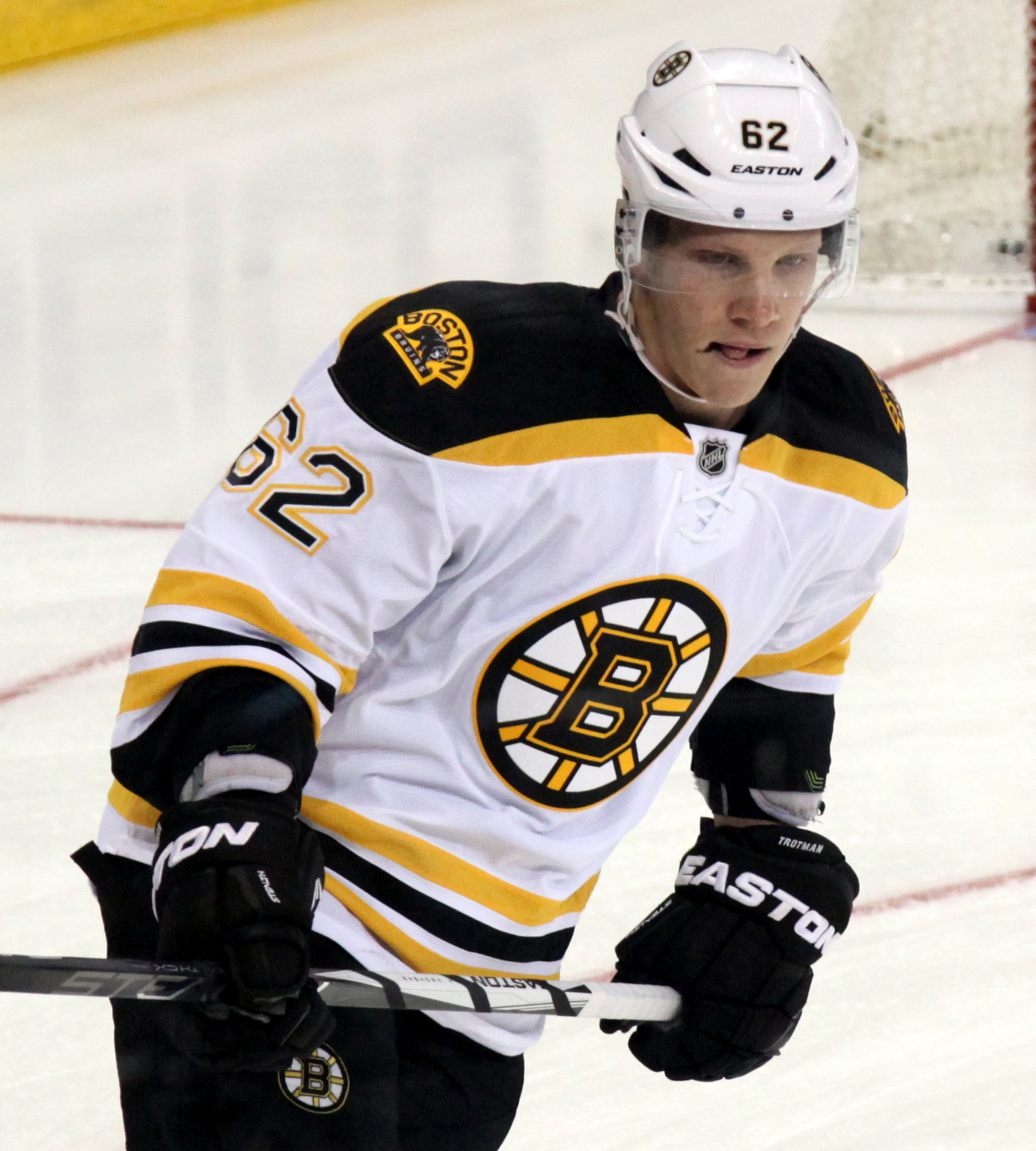
Zach Trotman

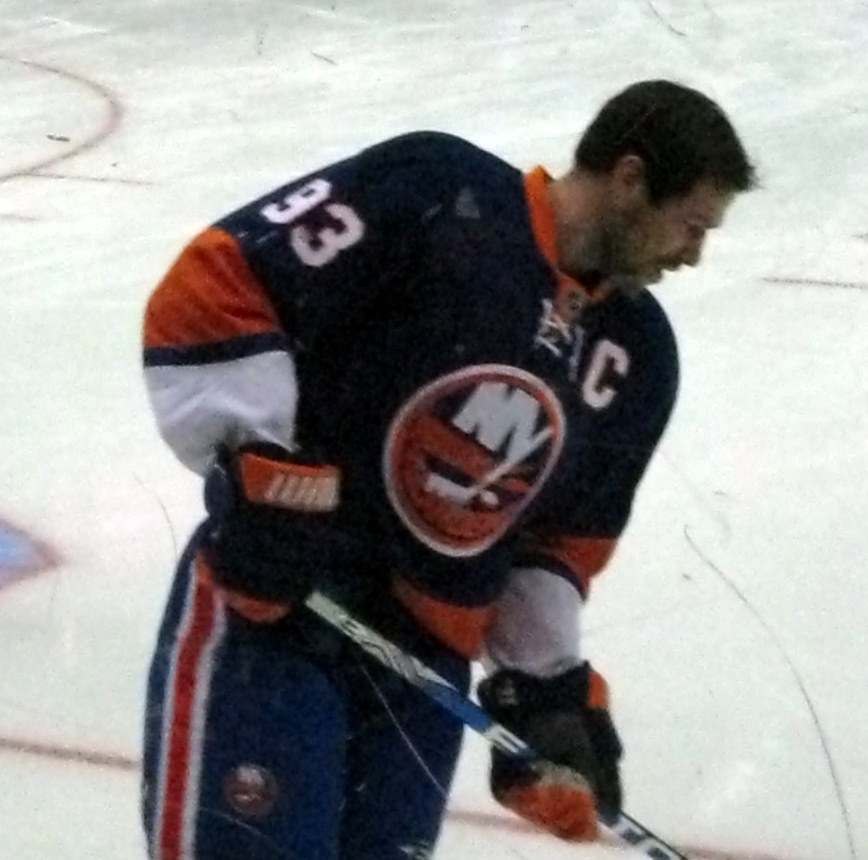
Doug Weight

== Media ==
All Lake Superior State Lakers hockey games are currently carried on local top 40 radio station WYSS. Since their first season in 1973 (aside from two brief sabbaticals), Lakers games have been called on the radio by Bill Crawford, who previously served in varying public relations and athletic positions from Lake Superior State University from 1988 to 2009, and also hosts the weekly Laker Hockey Show on sister AM station WKNW. Road games, particularly those held in Alaska, are called by the home team's broadcasting crews where needed.
