= Paul Cohen (ice hockey) =

Canadian ice hockey player

- Born: January 31, 1965 (age 61) Toronto, Ontario, Canada
- Height: 5 ft 11 in (180 cm)
- Weight: 187 lb (85 kg; 13 st 5 lb)
- Position: Goaltender
- Caught: Left
- Played for: AHL; Springfield Indians; Capital District Islanders; ECHL; Winston-Salem Thunderbirds; Richmond Renegades; Toledo Storm; Nashville Knights; Roanoke Express; IHL; Kansas City Blades
- NHL draft: Undrafted
- Playing career: 1989–2000

Paulhew "Paul" Cohen (born January 31, 1965) is a Canadian former professional ice hockey goaltender.

== Early life ==
Cohen was born in Toronto. Prior to turning professional, Cohen attended St. Lawrence University, where he played four seasons of NCAA Division-I hockey with the St. Lawrence Saints men's ice hockey team.

== Career ==
On March 28, 1992, when playing for the Springfield Indians, Cohen sent a rink-length shot into a Rochester empty net to become only the second goaltender in the American Hockey League's 55-year history to score a goal. The first AHL goaltender to score a goal was Darcy Wakaluk.

On January 14, 1993, the Sunshine Hockey League announced that they had suspended Cohen, then playing with the West Palm Beach Blaze, for the remainder of the season for delivering an illegal cross-check during a game that sent a player to the hospital with a concussion.

== Awards and honors ==
Award	Year
All-ECAC Hockey Second Team	1988–89
ECAC Hockey All-Tournament Team	1989
