= Karl Johnston (ice hockey) =

Canadian ice hockey player

- Born: August 11, 1967 (age 59) Windsor, Ontario, Canada
- Height: 6 ft 0 in (183 cm)
- Weight: 181 lb (82 kg; 12 st 13 lb)
- Position: Defenseman
- Played for: Lake Superior State; Springfield Indians; Louisville Icehawks; Raleigh IceCaps; Knoxville Cherokees; Amarillo Rattlers; Wichita Thunder
- Playing career: 1987–1999

Karl Johnston (born August 11, 1967) is a Canadian constable and former ice hockey Defenseman who was an All-American for Lake Superior State and helped the Lakers win their first National Championship in 1988.

== Career ==
Johnston began attending Lake Superior State University in 1987, joining the program just in time to help the Lakers win a national championship. Johnston finished second on the team in terms of scoring from the blueline and remained a mainstay on the defense for four years. His scoring output increased each year and LSSU made the NCAA Tournament each year he was with the club. As a senior, Johnston was named as an alternate captain and led the team to a program record 36 wins. Johnston was named to the All-American team and helped Lake State win the first conference championship in program history. Unfortunately, the top-seeded Lakers were upset in the national quarterfinals and Johnston's college career was over.

After graduating, Johnston signed with the New York Islanders organization and began his professional career with the Springfield Indians. He remained with the club for about a season and a half before being demoted to the ECHL. While he played well, Johnston realized that he needed another career path and retired after the 1994 season. He returned to Ontario and began working as a police officer in St. Thomas. He continued that work while making several additional appearances as a player for the remainder of the decade but eventually hung up his skates for good in 1999. In 2003 Johnston joined the Ontario Provincial Police and has worked as a constable ever since (as of 2021).

== Statistics ==
=== Regular season and playoffs ===
			Regular Season					Playoffs
Season	Team	League	GP	G	A	Pts	PIM	GP	G	A	Pts	PIM
1983–84	Windsor Royals	WJBHL	—	—	—	—	—	—	—	—	—	—
1985–86	London Diamonds	WJBHL	37	9	28	37	62	—	—	—	—	—
1986–87	London Diamonds	WJBHL	39	12	33	45	99	—	—	—	—	—
1987–88	Lake Superior State	CCHA	42	7	13	20	38	—	—	—	—	—
1988–89	Lake Superior State	CCHA	43	7	19	26	38	—	—	—	—	—
1989–90	Lake Superior State	CCHA	43	12	28	40	32	—	—	—	—	—
1990–91	Lake Superior State	CCHA	45	14	36	50	86	—	—	—	—	—
1991–92	Springfield Indians	AHL	34	1	11	12	17	—	—	—	—	—
1992–93	Springfield Indians	AHL	24	3	4	7	12	—	—	—	—	—
1992–93	Louisville Icehawks	ECHL	28	5	20	25	29	—	—	—	—	—
1993–94	Raleigh IceCaps	ECHL	48	14	23	37	84	12	2	3	5	4
1995–96	Knoxville Cherokees	ECHL	52	2	14	16	22	7	0	0	0	6
1996–97	Knoxville Cherokees	ECHL	3	0	0	0	4	—	—	—	—	—
1996–97	Amarillo Rattlers	WPHL	5	0	0	0	9	—	—	—	—	—
1998–99	Wichita Thunder	CHL	3	0	0	0	2	—	—	—	—	—
NCAA totals			173	40	96	136	194	—	—	—	—	—
AHL totals			58	4	15	19	29	—	—	—	—	—
ECHL totals			131	21	57	78	139	19	2	3	5	10

== Awards and honors ==
Award	Year
CCHA All-Tournament Team	1988
All-CCHA First Team	1990–91
AHCA West Second-Team All-American	1990–91
CCHA All-Tournament Team	1991
