= Bruce Racine =

Canadian ice hockey player

- Born: August 9, 1966 (age 60) Cornwall, Ontario, Canada
- Height: 6 ft 0 in (183 cm)
- Weight: 170 lb (77 kg; 12 st 2 lb)
- Position: Goaltender
- Caught: Left
- Played for: St. Louis Blues; Lukko; Ilves
- NHL draft: 58th overall, 1985; Pittsburgh Penguins
- Playing career: 1988–2004

Bruce Maurice Racine (born August 9, 1966) is a Canadian former professional ice hockey goaltender. He played 11 games in the National Hockey League with the St. Louis Blues during the 1995–96 season. The rest of his career, which lasted from 1988 to 2003, was mainly spent in the minor leagues.

== Playing career ==
The son of former Ottawa Rough Riders offensive lineman/kicker Moe Racine, Bruce was drafted in the third round, 58th overall by the Pittsburgh Penguins. He played his youth hockey in the Ottawa Valley and spent one season in the CJHL with the Hawkesbury Hawks before joining Northeastern University where he was a two-time All-American, He set school records for games played, minutes played and wins leading the Huskies to Beanpot Championships in 1985 and 1988 and a Hockey East Championship in 1988.

After his collegiate career, he signed with Pittsburgh. Racine played with the Penguins farm team the Muskegon Lumberjacks of the IHL, for parts of five seasons (with a break as the starting goaltender for the Albany Choppers). In the 1988/89 season with the Lumberjacks he led the IHL in wins and shutouts and was named to the league's First All-Star team. In 1991 Racine was recalled to Pittsburgh for the playoffs and dressed for four playoff games. Racine was included in the Stanley Cup team picture and given a Stanley Cup ring. Racine then played under contract for the Toronto Maple Leafs in the AHL for two seasons with the St. John's Maple Leafs.

Racine finally got his chance to play in an NHL game when he signed as a free agent with the St. Louis Blues in 1995. In the 1995/1996 season he started the year in the minors with the Peoria Rivermen but eventually got the call to back up Grant Fuhr. That year Fuhr set a record by playing in 79 games but coach Mike Keenan often pulled Fuhr during games, allowing Racine to play in 11 games, posting a 0–3–0 record and a 3.13 GAA. Racine also played in one playoff game after Fuhr was sidelined with an injury.

Racine played another five years in the IHL with the San Antonio Dragons and Fort Wayne Komets, being named the Komets' MVP in both seasons with Fort Wayne and setting franchise marks for goaltending. Racine spent one season under contract with the San Jose Sharks playing for the IHL Kansas City Blades. He finished his career playing one season for Lukko Rauma had a brief stint with Metallurg Novokuznetsk and 2 seasons for Ilves Tampere in Finland. He retired after the 2002/2003 season.

== Post-playing career ==
After retirement, he was an assistant coach at Northeastern University in the 2004–05 season. He now lives in St. Louis with his wife and runs the Racine Goaltending Academy for young keepers in the area; alumni of the program include NHLers Joseph Woll and Jakub Dobeš, as well as women's Olympic gold medalist Joy Dunne who began her hockey career in goal before moving to forward.

== Career statistics ==
=== Regular season and playoffs ===
			Regular season									Playoffs
Season	Team	League	GP	W	L	T	MIN	GA	SO	GAA	SV%	GP	W	L	MIN	GA	SO	GAA	SV%
1983–84	Hawkesbury Hawks	CJHL	30	—	—	—	1543	121	0	4.70	—	—	—	—	—	—	—	—	—
1984–85	Northeastern University	HE	26	11	14	1	1615	103	1	3.83	.882	—	—	—	—	—	—	—	—
1985–86	Northeastern University	HE	32	17	14	1	1920	147	0	4.56	.856	—	—	—	—	—	—	—	—
1986–87	Northeastern University	HE	33	12	18	3	1966	133	0	4.06	.875	—	—	—	—	—	—	—	—
1987–88	Northeastern University	HE	30	15	11	4	1808	108	1	3.58	.890	—	—	—	—	—	—	—	—
1988–89	Muskegon Lumberjacks	IHL	51	37	11	0	3039	184	3	3.63	—	5	4	1	300	15	0	3.00	—
1989–90	Muskegon Lumberjacks	IHL	49	29	15	4	2911	182	1	3.75	—	9	5	4	566	32	1	3.34	—
1990–91	Albany Choppers	IHL	29	7	18	1	1567	104	0	3.98	—	—	—	—	—	—	—	—	—
1990–91	Muskegon Lumberjacks	IHL	9	4	4	1	516	40	0	4.65	—	—	—	—	—	—	—	—	—
1991–92	Muskegon Lumberjacks	IHL	27	13	10	3	1559	91	1	3.50	—	1	0	1	60	6	0	6.00	—
1992–93	Cleveland Lumberjacks	IHL	35	13	16	6	1949	140	1	4.31	.879	2	0	0	37	2	0	3.24	.909
1993–94	St. John's Maple Leafs	AHL	37	20	9	2	1875	116	0	3.71	.876	1	0	0	20	1	0	0.00	1.000
1994–95	St. John's Maple Leafs	AHL	27	11	10	4	1492	85	1	3.42	.891	2	1	1	119	3	0	1.51	.954
1995–96	St. Louis Blues	NHL	11	0	3	0	231	12	0	3.13	.881	1	0	0	1	0	0	0.00	1.000
1995–96	Peoria Rivermen	IHL	22	11	10	1	1228	69	1	3.37	.902	1	0	1	59	3	0	3.05	.880
1996–97	San Antonio Dragons	IHL	44	25	14	2	2426	122	6	3.02	.906	6	3	2	325	17	0	3.13	.906
1997–98	San Antonio Dragons	IHL	15	4	9	1	836	51	0	3.66	.899	—	—	—	—	—	—	—	—
1997–98	Fort Wayne Komets	IHL	45	30	10	4	2605	109	1	2.51	.920	3	1	2	152	10	0	3.95	.855
1998–99	Fort Wayne Komets	IHL	53	21	18	11	3024	154	1	3.06	.909	1	0	1	60	5	0	5.00	.839
1999–00	Kansas City Blades	IHL	33	12	17	1	1765	84	1	2.86	.911	—	—	—	—	—	—	—	—
2000–01	Lukko	FIN	54	20	20	13	3257	133	—	2.45	.918	3	—	—	178	11	—	3.71	.888
2001–02	Ilves	FIN	37	13	13	11	2170	92	2	2.54	.914	2	—	—	120	10	—	5.00	.811
2002–03	Ilves	FIN	15	1	7	4	798	49	0	3.69	.876	—	—	—	—	—	—	—	—
NHL totals			11	0	3	0	231	12	0	3.13	.881	1	0	0	1	0	0	0.00	1.000

== Awards and honors ==
Award	Year
All-Hockey East Rookie Team	1984–85
All-Hockey East Second Team	1984–85
Eberly Award	1985, 1988
All-Hockey East First Team	1986–87
AHCA East First-Team All-American	1986–87
AHCA East First-Team All-American	1987–88
Hockey East All-Tournament Team	1988

Awards and achievements
Preceded by Brian Leetch	William Flynn Tournament Most Valuable Player; 1988	Succeeded by Bob Beers
