= Claudio Scremin =

- Born: May 28, 1968 (age 57) Burnaby, British Columbia, Canada
- Height: 6 ft 2 in (188 cm)
- Weight: 205 lb (93 kg; 14 st 9 lb)
- Position: Defence
- Shot: Right
- Played for: San Jose Sharks; Kansas City Blades; HC Varese; Hannover Scorpions; London Knights; Krefeld Pinguine
- NHL draft: 204th overall, 1988; Washington Capitals
- Playing career: 1990–2001

Claudio Francesco Scremin (born May 28, 1968) is a Canadian former professional ice hockey defenceman who played two seasons in the NHL for the San Jose Sharks.

== Playing career ==
Scremin began his collegiate career with the Maine Black Bears in 1986, having previously played for the Richmond Sockeyes of the BCJHL. After a quiet freshman season, Scremin performed well in his second season with the team, during the 1987–88 season, registering 24 points in 44 games. The team found success as well, narrowly losing the Hockey East Tournament to Northeastern. At the culmination of the season, Scremin was selected by the Washington Capitals in the 204th overall in the 1988 NHL entry draft.

The 1988–89 season was also successful, with Scremin increasing his scoring to 29 points in 45 games, and the Black Bears winning the Hockey East Tournament, overcoming Boston College in the final. As a result, the team qualified for the NCAA Tournament, where they made it to the Frozen Four, before losing to Minnesota. They finished the tournament 4th overall, after losing to Michigan State in the consolation game. In his final season in New England saw Scremin act as the captain for the team and again increasing his scoring, tallying 30 points in 44 games. During the season, Scremin's rights were traded by the Capitals to the Minnesota North Stars in exchange for goalie Don Beaupre.

The Black Bears again reached the final of the Hockey East Tournament during the 1989–90 season, losing to Boston College. Scremin was named to the Hockey East All Tournament Team and Hockey East All-Academic Team at the culmination of the season. Following this, Scremin graduated and turned professional.

Upon turning pro, Scremin played with the Kansas City Blades of the IHL during the 1990–91 season. His rookie season was a solid affair, scoring 21 points in 77 games. Scremin signed a contract with the San Jose Sharks as a free agent on September 3, 1991, and subsequently made his NHL debut in February 1992 against the Quebec Nordiques. Over the course of the 1991–92 season, he played a total of 13 games for the Sharks, as well as 70 for the Blades, who served as the Sharks' IHL affiliate team. The Blades finished on top of the Western Conference, and swept the Muskegon Lumberjacks 4–0 in the Turner Cup Finals. The following season Scremin again split his time between the Sharks and Blades. He played 4 games with San Jose, and scored what was his only NHL point with an assist in a game against the Tampa Bay Lightning in December 1992. With the Blades he played 75 games and registered 32 points, and the team reached the Turner Cup semifinals before losing to the San Diego Gulls.

Scremin's 1993–94 season was also spent primarily with the Blades, playing 38 games and scoring 24 points. In addition, he also played in Italy for Serie A side HC Varese. His stay in Lombardy was short, playing only 7 games, but nevertheless scoring Scremin scored 6 points. The following season, his fourth with the Blades, he scored 38 points in 61 games; the Blades reached the Turner Cup finals, before being swept by the Denver Grizzlies. Three further seasons with the Blades followed. During his final year in Kansas City, the 1997–98 season, Scremin had a career year posting 58 points in 81 games. After 8 years in Missouri, Scremin owned the franchise record for most games played (550), and was also the 3rd highest points scorer (286) in franchise history.

Scremin returned to Europe upon leaving the Blades, playing for German side Hannover Scorpions of the DEL. In his first season in Germany, Scremin registered 24 points in 52 games as the Scorpions finished 11th during the regular season, missing the playoffs. Following his year in Germany, he moved to the UK in order to play for BISL outfit London Knights, where he teamed up with former Blades team-mate Brent Cullaton. It was a successful season, with Scremin being named as a First Team All-Star after posting 33 points in 40 games, and the Knights winning the British Championship. Following his time in the UK, Scremin returned to Germany in order to play for the Krefeld Pinguine; joining him in NRW was fellow Knights defenceman Marc Hussey. There, Scremin scored 23 points in 56 games as the Pinguine narrowly missed out on a playoff berth. Following his second season in Germany, Scremin retired.

== Awards and achievements ==
- Hockey East Champion (1989)
- Hockey East All Tournament Team (1990)
- Hockey East All-Academic Team (1990)
- IHL Turner Cup Champion (1992)
- BISL First All-Star Team (2000)
- British Championship (2000)
- Kansas City Blades most games played (550)

== Career stats ==
=== Regular season and playoffs ===
			Regular season					Playoffs
Season	Team	League	GP	G	A	Pts	PIM	GP	G	A	Pts	PIM
1986-87	Maine Black Bears	HE	15	0	1	1	0	—	—	—	—	—
1987-88	Maine Black Bears	HE	44	6	18	24	22	—	—	—	—	—
1988-89	Maine Black Bears	HE	45	5	24	29	42	—	—	—	—	—
1989-90	Maine Black Bears	HE	45	4	26	30	14	—	—	—	—	—
1990–91	Kansas City Blades	IHL	77	7	14	21	60	—	—	—	—	—
1991–92	Kansas City Blades	IHL	70	5	23	28	44	15	1	6	7	14
1991–92	San Jose Sharks	NHL	13	0	0	0	25	—	—	—	—	—
1992–93	Kansas City Blades	IHL	75	10	22	32	93	12	0	5	5	18
1992–93	San Jose Sharks	NHL	4	0	1	1	4	—	—	—	—	—
1993–94	Kansas City Blades	IHL	38	7	17	24	39	—	—	—	—	—
1993–94	HC Varese	ITA	7	2	4	6	11	—	—	—	—	—
1994-95	Kansas City Blades	IHL	61	8	30	38	29	20	8	12	20	14
1995-96	Kansas City Blades	IHL	79	6	47	53	83	5	0	1	1	6
1996-97	Kansas City Blades	IHL	69	7	25	32	71	3	1	1	2	2
1997-98	Kansas City Blades	IHL	81	12	46	58	66	11	2	12	14	4
1998–99	Hannover Scorpions	DEL	52	7	17	24	40	—	—	—	—	—
1999–00	London Knights	BISL	40	7	26	33	18	8	3	8	11	6
2000–01	Krefeld Pinguine	DEL	56	6	17	23	52	—	—	—	—	—
	NHL totals		17	0	1	1	29	0	0	0	0	0
	IHL totals		550	62	224	286	485	66	12	37	49	58
