= Randy Skarda =

American ice hockey player (born 1968)

- Born: May 5, 1968 (age 58) West St. Paul, MN, USA
- Height: 6 ft 0 in (183 cm)
- Weight: 200 lb (91 kg; 14 st 4 lb)
- Position: Defense
- Shot: Right
- Played for: St. Louis Blues
- National team: United States
- NHL draft: 157th overall, 1986; St. Louis Blues
- Playing career: 1989–1994

Randall Jude Skarda (born May 5, 1968 ) is an American former professional ice hockey defenseman. He was drafted in the eighth round, 157th overall, by the St. Louis Blues in the 1986 NHL entry draft. He played twenty-six games in the National Hockey League with the Blues: twenty-five in the 1989–90 season and one more in the 1991–92 season. The rest of his career, which lasted from 1989 to 1994, was spent in the minor leagues.

== Career statistics ==
=== Regular season and playoffs ===
			Regular season					Playoffs
Season	Team	League	GP	G	A	Pts	PIM	GP	G	A	Pts	PIM
1984–85	Saint Thomas Academy	HS-MN	23	14	42	56	—	—	—	—	—	—
1985–86	Saint Thomas Academy	HS-MN	23	15	27	42	—	—	—	—	—	—
1986–87	University of Minnesota	WCHA	43	3	10	13	77	—	—	—	—	—
1987–88	University of Minnesota	WCHA	42	19	26	45	102	—	—	—	—	—
1988–89	University of Minnesota	WCHA	43	6	24	30	91	—	—	—	—	—
1989–90	St. Louis Blues	NHL	25	0	5	5	11	—	—	—	—	—
1989–90	Peoria Rivermen	IHL	38	7	17	24	40	4	0	0	0	0
1990–91	Peoria Rivermen	IHL	78	8	34	42	126	19	3	5	8	22
1991–92	St. Louis Blues	NHL	1	0	0	0	0	—	—	—	—	—
1991–92	Peoria Rivermen	IHL	57	8	24	32	64	7	0	0	0	14
1992–93	Milwaukee Admirals	IHL	54	3	9	12	104	—	—	—	—	—
1993–94	Prince Edward Island Senators	AHL	20	1	3	4	14	—	—	—	—	—
1993–94	Hershey Bears	AHL	4	0	2	2	0	—	—	—	—	—
1993–94	Johnstown Chiefs	ECHL	9	1	6	7	6	—	—	—	—	—
IHL totals			227	26	84	110	334	30	3	5	8	36
NHL totals			26	0	5	5	11	—	—	—	—	—

=== International ===
Year	Team	Event	GP	G	A	Pts	PIM
1988	United States	WJC	6	1	2	3	26
Junior totals			6	1	2	3	26

== Awards and honors ==
Award	Year
All-WCHA First Team	1987–88
AHCA West Second-Team All-American	1987–88
WCHA All-Tournament Team	1988
