= Mike Golden (ice hockey) =

American ice hockey player (born 1965)

- Born: July 17, 1965 (age 61) Boston, Massachusetts, U.S.
- Height: 6 ft 1 in (185 cm)
- Weight: 190 lb (86 kg; 13 st 8 lb)
- Position: Forward
- Shot: Right
- Played for: New Hampshire; Maine; Denver Rangers; Flint Spirits; Albany Choppers; Milwaukee Admirals; Binghamton Rangers
- NHL draft: 40th, 1983; Edmonton Oilers
- Playing career: 1983–1991

Michael Golden is an American retired ice hockey forward who was an All-American for the University of Maine.

== Career ==
Golden was a star player for Reading Memorial High School in Massachusetts, leading his team to a Middlesex League championship while scoring nearly three points per game. The Edmonton Oilers ended up selecting him in the second round of the 1983 NHL entry draft and he began attending the University of New Hampshire in the fall. Golden's tenure in Durham lasted just seven games and he left mid-season to play for both a junior-B team and at the World Junior Championships.

Golden ended up transferring to Maine and was forced to sit out the entire 1984–85 season due to NCAA requirements. He debuted for the Black Bears the following year and slowly worked his way to the top of the roster. Golden helped the team reach their first NCAA Tournament in 1987 and was named team captain for his senior season. 1988 was a new high for the program as they finished first in the Hockey East standings with Golden finishing second on the team and sixth in the nation in scoring. Maine received the top eastern seed in 1988 and won their quarterfinal match to make the program's first Frozen Four.

While he was in college, Golden had been traded by the Oilers to the New York Rangers in a package that included Reijo Ruotsalainen. He began his professional career in the Rangers' farm system and played well for two years. His scoring diminished in 1991 as he moved between three teams and he retired as a player following the year.

Golden returned home and hung around his old high school team, eventually joining as a volunteer assistant. He left for a few years after the turn of the century but returned as the head coach for the women's team in 2009. He built the team into a power in short order, leading the team to its first state championship in 2015 with a record of 22–2–0. Work commitments unfortunately forced him to resign from his position following the year but Golden had already left an indelible mark on the school.

== Statistics ==
=== Regular season and playoffs ===
			Regular Season					Playoffs
Season	Team	League	GP	G	A	Pts	PIM	GP	G	A	Pts	PIM
1982–83	Reading	MA-HS	23	22	41	63	—	—	—	—	—	—
1983–84	New Hampshire	ECAC Hockey	7	1	1	2	2	—	—	—	—	—
1984–85	Stratford Cullitons	MWJHL	12	8	12	20	18	—	—	—	—	—
1985–86	Maine	Hockey East	24	13	16	29	10	—	—	—	—	—
1986–87	Maine	Hockey East	36	19	23	42	37	—	—	—	—	—
1987–88	Maine	Hockey East	44	31	44	75	46	—	—	—	—	—
1988–89	Denver Rangers	IHL	36	12	10	22	21	3	3	1	4	0
1989–90	Flint Spirits	IHL	68	13	33	46	30	4	0	0	0	0
1990–91	Binghamton Rangers	AHL	8	2	0	2	0	—	—	—	—	—
1990–91	Albany Choppers	IHL	6	3	1	4	0	—	—	—	—	—
1990–91	Milwaukee Admirals	IHL	36	2	12	14	12	4	0	0	0	0
NCAA totals			111	64	84	148	95	—	—	—	—	—
IHL totals			146	30	56	86	63	11	3	1	4	2

=== International ===
Year	Team	Event	Result	GP	G	A	Pts	PIM
1984	United States	WJC	6th	7	1	3	4	0

== Awards and honors ==
Award	Year
All-Hockey East Second Team	1987–88
AHCA East Second-Team All-American	1987–88
