= Steve McKichan =

Canadian ice hockey player

- Born: May 29, 1967 (age 59) Strathroy, Ontario, Canada
- Height: 5 ft 11 in (180 cm)
- Weight: 180 lb (82 kg; 12 st 12 lb)
- Position: Goaltender
- Caught: Left
- Played for: Vancouver Canucks
- NHL draft: 1988 NHL Supplemental Draft; Vancouver Canucks
- Playing career: 1989–1990

Steve McKichan (born May 29, 1967) is a Canadian former professional ice hockey goaltender. Drafted out of Miami University by the Vancouver Canucks in the 1988 NHL Supplemental Draft, McKichan played one game in the National Hockey League with the Canucks in the 1990–91 season, playing for one period on December 5, 1990 against the New Jersey Devils and allowing two goals on eight shots.

In December 1990, McKichan suffered a career-ending neck injury while playing with the Milwaukee Admirals of the International Hockey League.

McKichan worked as a goaltending coach with the Toronto Maple Leafs during the 2006–07 season. As of 2015 he owns and operates a hockey school in Strathroy.

== Career statistics ==
=== Regular season and playoffs ===
			Regular season									Playoffs
Season	Team	League	GP	W	L	T	MIN	GA	SO	GAA	SV%	GP	W	L	MIN	GA	SO	GAA	SV%
1983–84	Strathroy Blades	WOHL	1	0	1	0	45	9	0	12.00	—	—	—	—	—	—	—	—	—
1984–85	Strathroy Blades	WOHL	23	—	—	—	1372	165	0	7.26	—	—	—	—	—	—	—	—	—
1985–86	Strathroy Blades	WOHL	17	—	—	—	1020	99	0	5.82	—	—	—	—	—	—	—	—	—
1986–87	Miami University	CCHA	28	3	19	0	1351	130	0	5.77	—	—	—	—	—	—	—	—	—
1987–88	Miami University	CCHA	34	12	17	1	1767	140	1	4.75	—	—	—	—	—	—	—	—	—
1988–89	Miami University	CCHA	21	4	15	0	1014	85	0	5.03	—	—	—	—	—	—	—	—	—
1989–90	Virginia Lancers	ECHL	28	16	11	2	1445	97	0	4.02	—	3	1	2	209	11	0	3.16	—
1989–90	Milwaukee Admirals	IHL	1	1	0	0	40	2	0	6.00	—	—	—	—	—	—	—	—	—
1990–91	Vancouver Canucks	NHL	1	0	0	0	20	2	0	6.00	.750	—	—	—	—	—	—	—	—
1990–91	Milwaukee Admirals	IHL	30	12	10	2	1571	87	2	3.32	—	4	1	2	212	13	0	3.68	—
NHL totals			1	0	0	0	20	2	0	6.00	.750	—	—	—	—	—	—	—	—

== See also ==
- List of players who played only one game in the NHL
