= Mike McHugh =

American ice hockey player

- Born: August 16, 1965 (age 60) Bowdoin, Maine, U.S.
- Height: 5 ft 10 in (178 cm)
- Weight: 190 lb (86 kg; 13 st 8 lb)
- Position: Left wing
- Shot: Left
- Played for: Minnesota North Stars; San Jose Sharks
- NHL draft: 1988 NHL Supplemental Draft; Minnesota North Stars
- Playing career: 1988–1998

Michael McHugh (born August 16, 1965) is an American former ice hockey left wing. He played 20 games in the National Hockey League with the Minnesota North Stars and San Jose Sharks from 1988 to 1991. The rest of his career, which lasted from 1988 to 1998, was spent in the minor leagues. He was drafted by the Minnesota North Stars with the first pick in the 1988 NHL Supplemental Draft.

== Playing career ==
After playing four seasons at the University of Maine, McHugh made his professional debut with the American Hockey League's Maine Mariners, appearing in one game at the end of the 1987–88 season. His first full season of professional hockey was 1988–89, during which he played in 70 games with the International Hockey League's Kalamazoo Wings and three NHL games with the North Stars.

After two more seasons spent mostly with Kalamazoo, with a few appearances with the North Stars, McHugh joined the expansion San Jose Sharks in the 1991 NHL Dispersal Draft. He appeared in eight games with the Sharks during their inaugural season of 1991–92, and tallied his first and only NHL goal as a Shark. This was his last NHL experience.

Though his NHL career was brief, McHugh became a star in the American Hockey League. In seven AHL seasons with the Springfield Indians and Hershey Bears, he scored 143 goals and added 239 assists. He was awarded the Jack A. Butterfield Trophy as MVP of the 1997 Calder Cup playoffs, as he scored nine goals and seven assists while leading Hershey to the AHL Championship.

In his brief NHL career, McHugh appeared in 20 games. His one goal scored in 1991–92 was his lone NHL point.

== Post-playing career ==
McHugh currently lives in Hershey, Pennsylvania with his wife; they have two daughters.

== Career statistics ==
=== Regular season and playoffs ===
			Regular season					Playoffs
Season	Team	League	GP	G	A	Pts	PIM	GP	G	A	Pts	PIM
1983–84	New Hampton School	HS-Prep	21	24	22	46	—	—	—	—	—	—
1984–85	University of Maine	HE	25	9	8	17	9	—	—	—	—	—
1985–86	University of Maine	HE	38	9	10	19	24	—	—	—	—	—
1986–87	University of Maine	HE	42	21	29	50	40	—	—	—	—	—
1987–88	University of Maine	HE	44	29	37	66	90	—	—	—	—	—
1987–88	Maine Mariners	AHL	1	0	0	0	0	—	—	—	—	—
1988–89	Minnesota North Stars	NHL	3	0	0	0	2	—	—	—	—	—
1988–89	Kalamazoo Wings	IHL	70	17	29	46	89	6	3	1	4	17
1989–90	Minnesota North Stars	NHL	3	0	0	0	0	—	—	—	—	—
1989–90	Kalamazoo Wings	IHL	73	14	17	31	96	10	0	6	6	16
1990–91	Minnesota North Stars	NHL	6	0	0	0	0	—	—	—	—	—
1990–91	Kalamazoo Wings	IHL	69	27	38	65	82	11	3	8	11	6
1991–92	San Jose Sharks	NHL	8	1	0	1	14	—	—	—	—	—
1991–92	Springfield Indians	AHL	70	23	31	54	51	11	4	7	11	25
1992–93	Springfield Indians	AHL	67	19	27	46	111	11	5	2	7	12
1993–94	Hershey Bears	AHL	80	27	43	70	58	11	9	3	12	14
1994–95	Hershey Bears	AHL	68	24	26	50	102	6	3	2	5	6
1995–96	Hershey Bears	AHL	75	15	42	57	118	5	2	2	4	2
1996–97	Hershey Bears	AHL	77	23	45	68	135	23	9	7	16	33
1997–98	Hershey Bears	AHL	66	12	25	37	143	7	1	1	2	26
AHL totals			504	143	239	382	718	74	33	24	57	118
NHL totals			20	1	0	1	16	—	—	—	—	—

== Awards and honors ==
Award	Year
Hockey East All-Tournament Team	1987, 1988
All-Hockey East First Team	1987–88
AHCA East Second-Team All-American	1987–88
AHL Jack A. Butterfield Trophy	1997

Awards and achievements
Preceded by Brian Leetch	Hockey East Player of the Year; 1987–88	Succeeded by Greg Brown
Preceded by Dixon Ward	Winner of the Jack A. Butterfield Trophy; 1996–97	Succeeded by Mike Maneluk
