= Steve Tuttle =

Canadian ice hockey player

- Born: January 5, 1966 (age 60) Vancouver, British Columbia, Canada
- Height: 6 ft 1 in (185 cm)
- Weight: 197 lb (89 kg; 14 st 1 lb)
- Position: Right wing
- Shot: Right
- Played for: St. Louis Blues
- NHL draft: 113th overall, 1984; St. Louis Blues
- Playing career: 1986–1998

Steve Walter Tuttle (born January 5, 1966) is a Canadian former professional ice hockey forward who played for parts of three seasons (1988–1991) for the St. Louis Blues of the National Hockey League, scoring a total of 28 goals in his career. He was traded to the Tampa Bay Lightning, spending time with their International Hockey League affiliate, the Peoria Rivermen. In 1993, without playing a single game for the Lightning, he was traded to the Quebec Nordiques, playing for their IHL affiliate, the Milwaukee Admirals. He retired after the 1997–98 season.

Tuttle is most commonly remembered for being the player whose skate accidentally slashed the throat of Clint Malarchuk during a 1989 game against the Buffalo Sabres.

== Career statistics ==
			Regular season					Playoffs
Season	Team	League	GP	G	A	Pts	PIM	GP	G	A	Pts	PIM
1983–84	Richmond Sockeyes	BCJHL	46	46	34	80	22	—	—	—	—	—
1984–85	University of Wisconsin	NCAA	28	3	4	7	0	—	—	—	—	—
1985–86	University of Wisconsin	NCAA	32	2	10	12	2	—	—	—	—	—
1986–87	University of Wisconsin	NCAA	42	31	21	52	14	—	—	—	—	—
1987–88	University of Wisconsin	NCAA	45	27	39	66	18	—	—	—	—	—
1988–89	St. Louis Blues	NHL	53	13	12	25	6	6	1	2	3	0
1989–90	St. Louis Blues	NHL	71	12	10	22	4	5	0	1	1	2
1990–91	St. Louis Blues	NHL	20	3	6	9	2	6	0	3	3	0
1990–91	Peoria Rivermen	IHL	42	24	32	56	8	—	—	—	—	—
1991–92	Peoria Rivermen	IHL	71	43	46	89	22	10	4	8	12	4
1992–93	Milwaukee Admirals	IHL	51	27	34	61	12	4	0	2	2	2
1992–93	Halifax Citadels	AHL	22	11	17	28	2	—	—	—	—	—
1993–94	Milwaukee Admirals	IHL	78	27	44	71	34	4	0	2	2	4
1994–95	Peoria Rivermen	IHL	38	14	13	27	14	—	—	—	—	—
1994–95	Milwaukee Admirals	IHL	21	3	1	4	8	—	—	—	—	—
1995–96	Milwaukee Admirals	IHL	81	32	35	67	36	5	1	2	3	0
1996–97	Milwaukee Admirals	IHL	71	25	19	44	20	3	1	1	2	2
1997–98	Milwaukee Admirals	IHL	37	7	6	13	26	10	3	4	7	2
NHL totals			144	28	28	56	12	17	1	6	7	2
IHL totals			490	202	230	432	180	36	9	19	28	14

== Awards and honours ==
Award	Year
All-WCHA Second team	1987–88
AHCA West Second-Team All-American	1987–88
WCHA All-Tournament Team	1988
