= Mario Thyer =

Canadian ice hockey player

- Born: September 29, 1966 (age 58); Montreal, Quebec, Canada
- Height: 5 ft 11 in (180 cm)
- Weight: 170 lb (77 kg; 12 st 2 lb)
- Position: Centre
- Shot: Left
- Played for: Minnesota North Stars
- NHL draft: Undrafted
- Playing career: 1989–1994

Mario Thyer (born September 29, 1966) is a Canadian former professional ice hockey player who played five regular season games in the National Hockey League (NHL) with the Minnesota North Stars during the 1989–90 season. The rest of his career, which lasted from 1989 to 1994, was mainly spent in the minor International Hockey League.

== Career statistics ==
=== Regular season and playoffs ===
			Regular season					Playoffs
Season	Team	League	GP	G	A	Pts	PIM	GP	G	A	Pts	PIM
1982–83	Montreal Concordia	QMAAA	48	20	37	57	—	—	—	—	—	—
1985–86	Saint-Laurent Patriotes	QCAAA	—	—	—	—	—	—	—	—	—	—
1986–87	Saint-Laurent Patriotes	QCAAA	23	15	24	39	—	—	—	—	—	—
1987–88	University of Maine	HE	44	24	42	66	4	—	—	—	—	—
1988–89	University of Maine	HE	9	9	7	16	0	—	—	—	—	—
1989–90	Minnesota North Stars	NHL	5	0	0	0	0	1	0	0	0	2
1989–90	Kalamazoo Wings	IHL	68	19	42	61	12	10	2	6	8	4
1990–91	Kalamazoo Wings	IHL	75	15	51	66	15	10	4	5	9	2
1991–92	Kalamazoo Wings	IHL	46	17	28	45	0	—	—	—	—	—
1991–92	Binghamton Rangers	AHL	9	2	7	9	0	3	0	0	0	0
1992–93	Cincinnati Cyclones	IHL	77	13	36	49	26	—	—	—	—	—
1993–94	EHC Essen	GER-2	14	6	7	13	4	—	—	—	—	—
1993–94	Portland Pirates	AHL	3	0	0	0	0	—	—	—	—	—
IHL totals			266	64	157	221	53	20	6	11	17	6
NHL totals			5	0	0	0	0	1	0	0	0	2

== Awards and honors ==
Award	Year
All-Hockey East Rookie Team	1987–88
Hockey East All-Tournament Team	1988

Awards and achievements
Preceded by Brian Leetch	Hockey East Rookie of the Year; 1987–88	Succeeded by Rob Gaudreau/Scott Pellerin
