= Dave Capuano =

American ice hockey player (born 1968)

- Born: July 27, 1968 (age 57) Warwick, Rhode Island, U.S.
- Height: 6 ft 2 in (188 cm)
- Weight: 195 lb (88 kg; 13 st 13 lb)
- Position: Left wing
- Shot: Left
- Played for: NHL; Pittsburgh Penguins; Vancouver Canucks; Tampa Bay Lightning; San Jose Sharks; AHL; Hamilton Canucks; Providence Bruins; IHL; Muskegon Lumberjacks; Milwaukee Admirals; Atlanta Knights
- National team: United States
- NHL draft: 25th overall, 1986; Pittsburgh Penguins
- Playing career: 1989–1994

Dave Alan Capuano (born July 27, 1968) is an American former professional ice hockey left winger. Capuano was born in Warwick, Rhode Island, but grew up in Cranston, Rhode Island.

Now he lives with his Wife Lori, and his 2 kids Jaclyn and Max.

== Playing career ==
Capuano played for the University of Maine for three seasons from 1986 to 1989. He was drafted by the Pittsburgh Penguins in the second round of the 1986 NHL entry draft, 25th overall. His first NHL game was during the 1989–90 season, when he played 6 games for the Penguins. He was traded to the Vancouver Canucks on January 8, 1990, in a trade that sent Capuano, Andrew McBain and Dan Quinn to the Canucks for Rod Buskas, Barry Pederson and Tony Tanti. He played 88 games with the Canucks before being traded again, this time to the Tampa Bay Lightning for Anatoli Semenov. He only played 6 games with the Lightning during the 1992–93 season before being traded to the San Jose Sharks in June 1993. He would play only 4 games with the Sharks before retiring from professional hockey.

== Personal life ==
He currently resides in Cranston, Rhode Island with his wife. Capuano is still involved in hockey, coaching for the new junior team of the Metropolitan Junior Hockey League, the Cranston Reds. His brother Jack Capuano was the head coach of the New York Islanders, and his son, Max MacKay, is a former player in the ECHL last playing a stint in the 2014–15 season with the Wheeling Nailers.

== Awards and honors ==
Award	Year
All-Hockey East Rookie Team	1986–87
All-ECAC Hockey First Team	1987–88
AHCA East First-Team All-American	1987–88
All-NCAA All-Tournament Team	1988
All-ECAC Hockey First Team	1988–89
AHCA East First-Team All-American	1988–89
Inducted into the RI Hockey Hall of Fame	2020

- Hobey Baker Award Finalist (1988, 1989)

== Transactions ==
- June 21, 1986 – Drafted in the second round, 25th overall by the Pittsburgh Penguins in the 1986 NHL entry draft
- January 8, 1990 – Traded by the Pittsburgh Penguins with Andrew McBain and Dan Quinn to the Vancouver Canucks for Rod Buskas, Barry Pederson, and Tony Tanti
- November 3, 1992 – Traded by the Vancouver Canucks with the Canucks' fourth round selection (Ryan Duthie) in the 1994 NHL entry draft to the Tampa Bay Lightning for Anatoli Semenov
- June 19, 1993 – Traded by the Tampa Bay Lightning to the San Jose Sharks for Peter Ahola
- November 5, 1993 – Traded by the San Jose Sharks to the Boston Bruins for cash

== Career statistics ==
=== Regular season and playoffs ===
			Regular season					Playoffs
Season	Team	League	GP	G	A	Pts	PIM	GP	G	A	Pts	PIM
1984–85	Mount St. Charles Academy	HS-RI	22	41	38	79	18	—	—	—	—	—
1985–86	Mount St. Charles Academy	HS-RI	22	39	48	87	20	—	—	—	—	—
1986–87	University of Maine	HE	38	18	41	59	14	—	—	—	—	—
1987–88	University of Maine	HE	42	34	51	85	51	—	—	—	—	—
1988–89	University of Maine	HE	41	37	30	67	38	—	—	—	—	—
1989–90	Muskegon Lumberjacks	IHL	27	15	15	30	22	—	—	—	—	—
1989–90	Milwaukee Admirals	IHL	2	0	4	4	0	6	1	5	6	0
1989–90	Pittsburgh Penguins	NHL	6	0	0	0	2	—	—	—	—	—
1989–90	Vancouver Canucks	NHL	27	3	5	8	10	—	—	—	—	—
1990–91	Vancouver Canucks	NHL	61	13	31	44	42	6	1	1	2	5
1991–92	Milwaukee Admirals	IHL	9	2	6	8	8	—	—	—	—	—
1992–93	Hamilton Canucks	AHL	4	0	1	1	0	—	—	—	—	—
1992–93	Atlanta Knights	IHL	58	19	40	59	50	8	2	2	4	9
1992–93	Tampa Bay Lightning	NHL	6	1	1	2	2	—	—	—	—	—
1993–94	Providence Bruins	AHL	51	24	29	53	64	—	—	—	—	—
1993–94	San Jose Sharks	NHL	4	0	1	1	0	—	—	—	—	—
NHL totals			104	17	38	55	56	6	1	1	2	5

=== International ===
Year	Team	Event	GP	G	A	Pts	PIM
1987	United States	WJC	7	1	1	2	2

Awards and achievements
Preceded by Tony Hrkac	NCAA Ice Hockey Scoring Champion; 1987–88 With Steve Johnson and Paul Polillo	Succeeded by Bobby Reynolds/Kip Miller
