= Jack Capuano =

American ice hockey player and coach

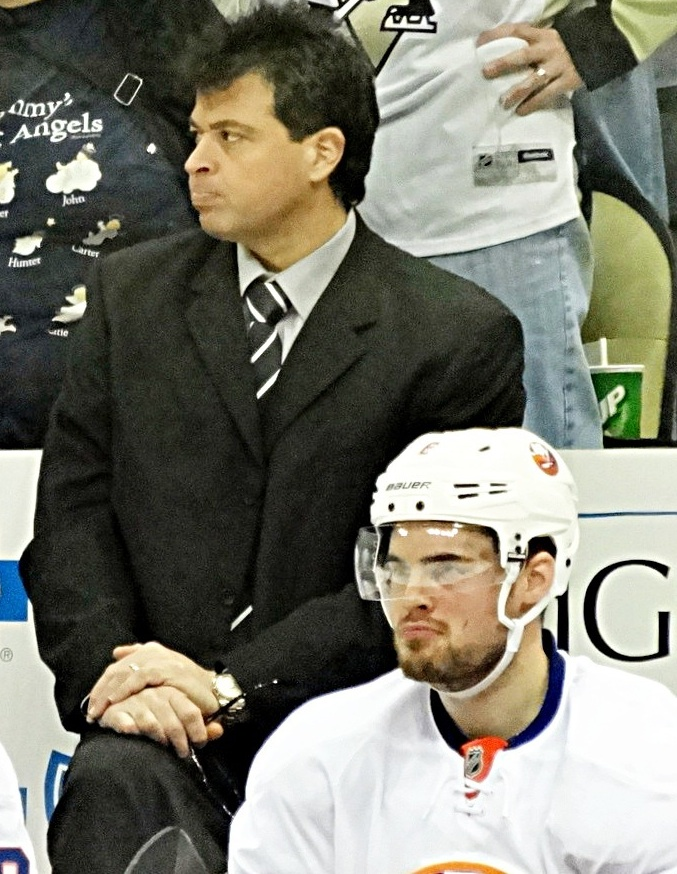
- Capuano coaching the New York Islanders during the 2013 Stanley Cup playoffs
- Born: July 7, 1966 (age 60) Cranston, Rhode Island, U.S.
- Height: 6 ft 1 in (185 cm)
- Weight: 175 lb (79 kg; 12 st 7 lb)
- Position: Defense
- Shot: Left
- Played for: Toronto Maple Leafs; Vancouver Canucks; Boston Bruins
- Coached for: New York Islanders
- NHL draft: 88th overall, 1984; Toronto Maple Leafs
- Playing career: 1988–1992

Jack C. Capuano Jr. (born July 7, 1966) is an American ice hockey coach and former player. He is a former head coach of the New York Islanders of the National Hockey League (NHL). He is currently an associate coach for the Minnesota Wild of the National Hockey League (NHL). Capuano played as a defenseman and spent parts of three seasons in the NHL in the late 1980s and early 1990s. He is the older brother of former NHL hockey player Dave Capuano.

== Playing career ==
Capuano played high school hockey at the Kent School in Kent, Connecticut and was a 5th round selection (88th overall) in the 1984 NHL entry draft. He played his college hockey at the University of Maine. At Maine, he was a teammate of his younger brother Dave Capuano and played on the same blueline as future NHLers Eric Weinrich and Bob Beers along with future Toronto Maple Leafs General Manager, Dave Nonis. He enjoyed a decorated college career, earning First-Team All-American honors in his junior year. His 32 goals remains the most ever by a Black Bear defenseman.

Capuano turned pro in 1988 following his junior year and signed with the Maple Leafs. He spent his first season with the Newmarket Saints of the AHL recording 21 points in 74 games. He would crack the Leafs' NHL roster for the 1989–90 season, but played in only 1 game before Tom Kurvers returned from a holdout, forcing his demotion. Shortly after his demotion, he walked out on the Saints and demanded a trade, feeling he belonged in the NHL.

Toronto would deal Capuano to the New York Islanders mid-season, but they too assigned him to the AHL. He played only 17 games in the Islanders' system before being dealt again, this time to the Vancouver Canucks.

Capuano would have his finest professional season in 1990–91, recording 20 goals and 50 points and earning 2nd-team All-Star honors in the IHL playing for the Milwaukee Admirals, Vancouver's minor-pro affiliate. He received a three-game callup to the Canucks, where he received the opportunity to play with his brother Dave. The two became the first pair of brothers in Canucks history to suit up for the team at the same time.

Capuano signed as a free agent with the Boston Bruins for the 1991–92 season. He enjoyed another solid season in the AHL, and another two games of NHL action with the Bruins, but chose to retire at the end of the season. He finished his career having appeared in 6 NHL games without recording a point.

== Coaching career ==
Following his career as a player, Capuano moved into coaching. He served as an assistant coach with the Tallahassee Tiger Sharks of the ECHL before being hired as head coach of the ECHL's Pee Dee Pride in 1997 and added the GM title to his responsibilities a year later. He left the bench in 1999 but continued as GM until 2005, when the franchise folded.

Capuano then signed on to be an assistant coach for the New York Islanders in the 2005–06 season. The team played fairly well, despite a midseason coaching change, but failed to make the playoffs. The following season, 2006–07, Capuano became an assistant coach for the Islanders' AHL affiliate, the Bridgeport Sound Tigers. On April 30, 2007, Capuano was named head coach of the Sound Tigers for the 2007–2008 season.

On November 15, 2010, Capuano was named interim head coach of the Islanders after head coach Scott Gordon was fired from that position by GM Garth Snow amidst a 10-game losing streak by the team. The Islanders retained Capuano as the full-time coach for the 2011–12 season. During the 2012-13 season, Capuano missed the season-opener due to kidney stones before being medically cleared to return to the bench. Capuano led the Islanders to a playoff spot later that year, their first appearance in six years.

On April 27, 2016, Capuano was hit by a puck during a playoff game between the New York Islanders and Tampa Bay Lightning.

On January 17, 2017, Capuano was relieved from his duties as the head coach by the Islanders. He left as the second-winningest coach in franchise history, behind only Hall of Famer Al Arbour.

In 2017-18 and 2018–19, Capuano served as associate coach for Florida Panthers

On June 6, 2019, Capuano was named associate coach of the Ottawa Senators and remained in this role through the 2023-24 season.

On July 1, 2024, Capuano was named associate coach of the Minnesota Wild.

== Career statistics ==
=== Regular season and playoffs ===
			Regular season					Playoffs
Season	Team	League	GP	G	A	Pts	PIM	GP	G	A	Pts	PIM
1983–84	Kent School	HS-Prep	25	10	8	18	20	—	—	—	—	—
1985–86	University of Maine	HE	39	9	18	27	51	—	—	—	—	—
1986–87	University of Maine	HE	42	10	34	44	20	—	—	—	—	—
1987–88	University of Maine	HE	43	13	37	50	87	—	—	—	—	—
1988–89	Newmarket Saints	AHL	74	5	16	21	52	1	0	0	0	0
1989–90	Newmarket Saints	AHL	8	0	2	2	7	—	—	—	—	—
1989–90	Springfield Indians	AHL	14	0	4	4	8	—	—	—	—	—
1989–90	Milwaukee Admirals	IHL	17	3	10	13	60	6	0	1	1	12
1989–90	Toronto Maple Leafs	NHL	1	0	0	0	0	—	—	—	—	—
1990–91	Milwaukee Admirals	IHL	80	20	30	50	76	6	0	1	1	2
1990–91	Vancouver Canucks	NHL	3	0	0	0	0	—	—	—	—	—
1991–92	Maine Mariners	AHL	74	14	26	40	35	—	—	—	—	—
1991–92	Boston Bruins	NHL	2	0	0	0	0	—	—	—	—	—
AHL totals			170	19	48	67	102	1	0	0	0	0
NHL totals			6	0	0	0	0	—	—	—	—	—

=== NHL coaching statistics ===
Team	Year	Regular season						Postseason			
Team	Year	G	W	L	OTL	Pts	Finish	W	L	W%	Result
NYI	2010–11	65	26	29	10	(73)	5th in Atlantic	—	—	—	Did not qualify
NYI	2011–12	82	34	37	11	79	5th in Atlantic	—	—	—	Did not qualify
NYI	2012–13	48	24	17	7	55	3rd in Atlantic	2	4	.333	Lost in Conference quarterfinals (PIT)
NYI	2013–14	82	34	37	11	79	8th in Metropolitan	—	—	—	Did not qualify
NYI	2014–15	82	47	28	7	101	3rd in Metropolitan	3	4	.429	Lost in first round (WSH)
NYI	2015–16	82	45	27	10	100	4th in Metropolitan	5	6	.455	Lost in second round (TBL)
NYI	2016–17	42	17	17	8	42	(fired)	—	—	—	—
NYI Total		483	227	192	64			10	14	.417	3 playoff appearances

== Awards and honours ==
Award	Year
All-Hockey East Second Team	1986–87
All-Hockey East First Team	1987–88
AHCA East First-Team All-American	1987–88
Hockey East All-Tournament Team	1988
Inducted into RI Hockey Hall of Fame	2019

- Holds Maine Black Bears record for career goals by a defenseman (32, 1985–88)
- IHL Second All-Star Team (1990–91)
- Coached Team USA/World in ECHL All-Star Game

Sporting positions
Preceded by Scott Gordon	Head coach of the New York Islanders; 2010–2017	Succeeded by Doug Weight
