= Kip Miller =

American ice hockey player (born 1969)

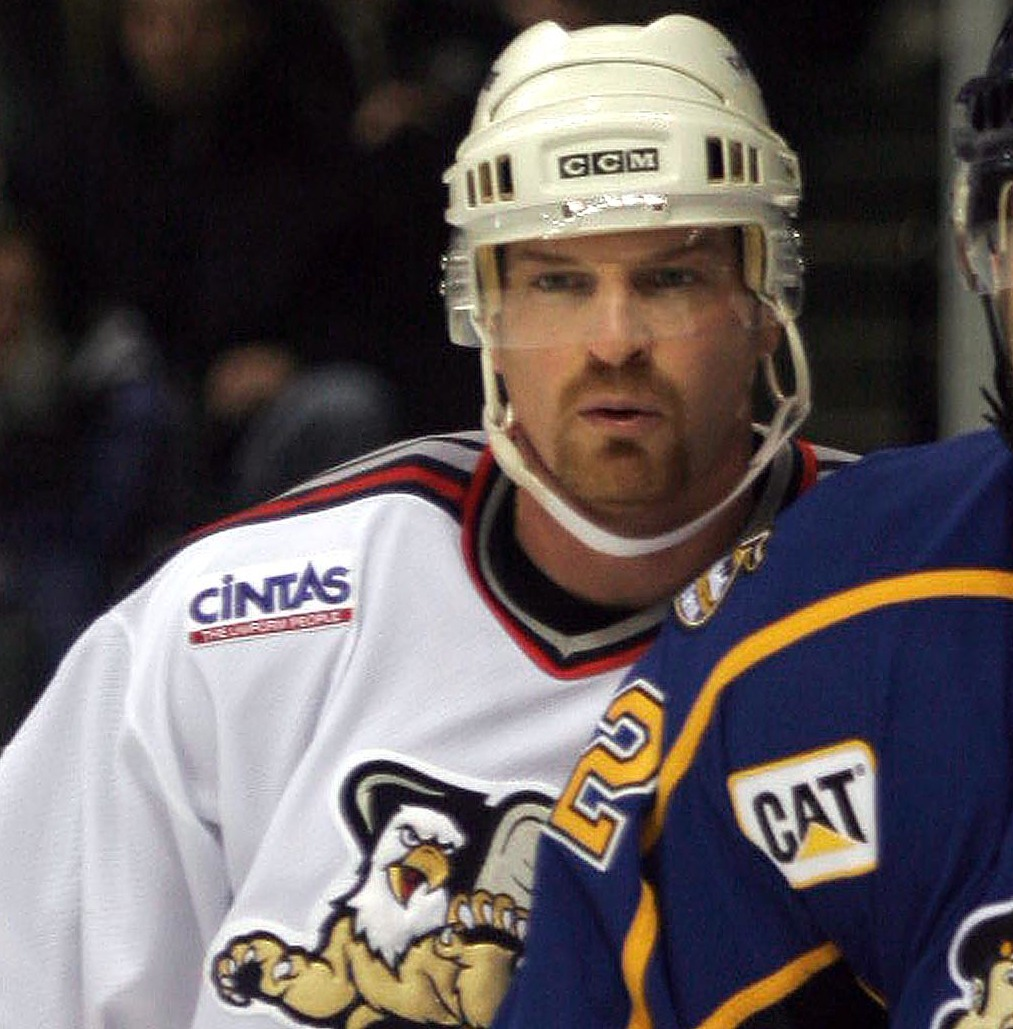
- Miller with the Grand Rapids Griffins in 2007
- Born: June 11, 1969 (age 56) Lansing, Michigan, U.S.
- Height: 5 ft 10 in (178 cm)
- Weight: 190 lb (86 kg; 13 st 8 lb)
- Position: Center
- Shot: Left
- Played for: Quebec Nordiques; Minnesota North Stars; San Jose Sharks; New York Islanders; Chicago Blackhawks; Pittsburgh Penguins; Mighty Ducks of Anaheim; Washington Capitals
- National team: United States
- NHL draft: 72nd overall, 1987; Quebec Nordiques
- Playing career: 1990–2007

Kip Charles Miller (born June 11, 1969) is an American former ice hockey forward. He last played for the American Hockey League Grand Rapids Griffins in 2006–07. He was drafted by the Quebec Nordiques as their 4th-round pick in the 1987 NHL entry draft, 72nd overall.

== Playing career ==
Miller was born in Lansing, Michigan, and played college hockey for the Michigan State University Spartans. During his college career he registered 116 goals, 145 assists and 261 points, leading the CCHA in scoring for two consecutive seasons. Miller was awarded the Hobey Baker Memorial Award in 1990, the first Spartan to receive the honor. Miller's cousin, goaltender Ryan Miller, was the second Spartan to win the Hobey Baker Award in 2001. In all, ten members of Miller's family (including his brothers Kevin and Kelly) have played college hockey for Michigan State. Kip's other cousin and Ryan Miller's brother is Drew Miller who played for the Detroit Red Wings. During his twelve-year NHL career, Miller played for the Nordiques, Minnesota North Stars, San Jose Sharks, New York Islanders, Chicago Blackhawks, Pittsburgh Penguins, Mighty Ducks of Anaheim and Washington Capitals.

Miller is the only player in New York Islanders history to play for the team three different times.

== Career statistics ==
=== Regular season and playoffs ===
			Regular season					Playoffs
Season	Team	League	GP	G	A	Pts	PIM	GP	G	A	Pts	PIM
1984–85	Compuware Ambassadors	MNHL	65	69	63	132	—	—	—	—	—	—
1985–86	Compuware Ambassadors	GLJHL	30	25	28	53	—	—	—	—	—	—
1986–87	Michigan State University	CCHA	45	22	20	42	94	—	—	—	—	—
1987–88	Michigan State University	CCHA	39	16	25	41	51	—	—	—	—	—
1988–89	Michigan State University	CCHA	47	32	45	77	94	—	—	—	—	—
1989–90	Michigan State University	CCHA	45	48	53	101	60	—	—	—	—	—
1990–91	Halifax Citadels	AHL	66	36	33	69	40	—	—	—	—	—
1990–91	Quebec Nordiques	NHL	13	4	3	7	7	—	—	—	—	—
1991–92	Quebec Nordiques	NHL	36	5	10	15	12	—	—	—	—	—
1991–92	Halifax Citadels	AHL	24	9	17	26	8	—	—	—	—	—
1991–92	Kalamazoo Wings	IHL	6	1	8	9	4	12	3	9	12	12
1991–92	Minnesota North Stars	NHL	3	1	2	3	2	—	—	—	—	—
1992–93	Kalamazoo Wings	IHL	61	17	39	56	59	—	—	—	—	—
1993–94	San Jose Sharks	NHL	11	2	2	4	6	—	—	—	—	—
1993–94	Kansas City Blades	IHL	71	38	54	92	51	—	—	—	—	—
1994–95	New York Islanders	NHL	8	0	1	1	0	—	—	—	—	—
1994–95	Denver Grizzlies	IHL	71	46	60	106	54	17	15	14	29	8
1995–96	Indianapolis Ice	IHL	73	32	59	91	46	5	2	6	8	2
1995–96	Chicago Blackhawks	NHL	10	1	4	5	2	—	—	—	—	—
1996–97	Chicago Wolves	IHL	43	11	41	52	32	—	—	—	—	—
1996–97	Indianapolis Ice	IHL	37	17	24	41	18	4	2	2	4	2
1997–98	New York Islanders	NHL	9	1	3	4	2	—	—	—	—	—
1997–98	Utah Grizzlies	IHL	72	38	59	97	30	4	3	2	5	10
1998–99	Pittsburgh Penguins	NHL	77	19	23	42	22	13	2	7	9	19
1999–2000	Pittsburgh Penguins	NHL	44	4	15	19	10	—	—	—	—	—
1999–2000	Mighty Ducks of Anaheim	NHL	30	6	17	23	4	—	—	—	—	—
2000–01	Pittsburgh Penguins	NHL	33	3	8	11	6	—	—	—	—	—
2000–01	Grand Rapids Griffins	IHL	34	16	19	35	12	10	5	8	13	2
2001–02	Grand Rapids Griffins	AHL	41	21	35	56	27	—	—	—	—	—
2001–02	New York Islanders	NHL	37	7	17	24	6	7	4	2	6	2
2002–03	Washington Capitals	NHL	72	12	38	50	18	5	0	2	2	2
2003–04	Washington Capitals	NHL	66	9	22	31	8	—	—	—	—	—
2004–05	Grand Rapids Griffins	AHL	50	13	32	45	17	—	—	—	—	—
2005–06	Chicago Wolves	AHL	67	19	40	59	48	—	—	—	—	—
AHL totals			326	123	204	327	188	7	0	5	5	12
NHL totals			449	74	165	239	105	25	6	11	17	23
IHL totals			468	216	363	579	306	52	30	41	71	36

=== International ===
Year	Team	Event	GP	G	A	Pts	PIM
1988	United States	WJC	7	2	2	4	2
1990	United States	WC	9	1	1	2	10
Senior totals			9	1	1	2	10

== Awards and honors ==
Award	Year	Ref
All-CCHA First Team	1988–89	
AHCA West First-Team All-American	1988–89	
All-CCHA First Team	1989–90	
AHCA West First-Team All-American	1989–90	
Hobey Baker Award	1990	

== See also ==
- Notable families in the NHL

Awards and achievements
Preceded by Steve Johnson/Dave Capuano/Paul Polillo	NCAA Ice Hockey Scoring Champion; 1988–89 (with Bobby Reynolds), 1989–90	Succeeded by Scott Beattie
Preceded by Bruce Hoffort	CCHA Player of the Year; 1989-90	Succeeded by Jim Dowd
Preceded by Lane MacDonald	Winner of the Hobey Baker Award; 1989–90	Succeeded by David Emma
