= Phil Berger (ice hockey) =

American ice hockey player (born 1966)

- Born: December 3, 1966 (age 58); Dearborn, Michigan, U.S.
- Height: 6 ft 2 in (188 cm)
- Weight: 190 lb (86 kg; 13 st 8 lb)
- Position: Right wing
- Shot: Right
- Played for: Northern Michigan; Fort Wayne Komets; Greensboro Monarchs; Halifax Citadels; Muskegon Fury; Cornwall Aces; Detroit Falcons; Schalker Sharks; Charlotte Checkers; El Paso Buzzards; San Antonio Dragons; Raleigh IceCaps; Hampton Roads Admirals; Greensboro Generals
- NHL draft: 1988 NHL Supplemental Draft; Quebec Nordiques
- Playing career: 1985–2000

Philip Berger (born December 3, 1966) is an American former professional ice hockey right wing and coach who was an All-American for Northern Michigan and a member of the ECHL Hall of Fame.

== Career ==
Berger began playing for the Northern Michigan Wildcats in 1985 but found it difficult to get into games. In his first two seasons, Berger played in only about half of NMU's contests but did show some improvement as a sophomore. In his junior season, Berger finally played most of the games and his scoring production skyrocketed. He nearly quadrupled his career scoring totals and finished in the top 10 in the nation. He was named an All-American and scored almost a quarter of Northern Michigan's goals for the season. Unfortunately, the wildcats weren't very good and knocked out in the conference quarterfinals. Berger's late blooming caused the Quebec Nordiques to take a flyer on him with the 3rd selection in the 1988 Supplemental Draft.

Though Berger's offensive numbers dipped in his senior season, he was again top-10 in the country and led the Wildcats to a renaissance. The Wildcats finished second in the WCHA and won their first WCHA Championship. Northern Michigan returned to the NCAA Tournament for the first time in 8 years but were knocked out of the first round 1–2.

The following season, Berger began his professional career in the IHL but soon found himself demoted to the ECHL. He soon grew accustomed to the league and led the Greensboro Monarchs in scoring despite missing 14 games. He led the team on a run through the playoffs with 11 goals, 6 more than the next highest Monarch, and captured the Riley Cup as league champions. Berger got a brief promotion to the AHL the following year but spent the bulk of the year back in Greensboro. His scoring dropped for the regular season but his playoff performance was even more impressive, finishing 3rd overall despite Greensboro losing the championship.

In 1992, Berger Put together a spectacular season, averaging a goal per game as he played the entire year in Greensboro and led the league in scoring. He was named the ECHL MVP and led the Monarchs to the East Conference Championship. He was a force in the postseason again, leading his team in goals, assists and points, but Greensboro fell in the conference finals. He finished out the year with the Fort Wayne Komets, adding 6 points in 4 IHL postseason games. The massive amount of scoring he had done in 1992 led Berger receiving a promotion to the IHL in 1993 but, despite producing 7 points in 8 games, he eventually found himself back with the Monarchs. Even though he missed almost a third of the team's games he still finished second in scoring for Greensboro.

Berger had another monster season in 1994, leading the ECHL in scoring even with a brief callup to the AHL. The next season he split between Greenboro, Detroit and Schalker but a knee injury limited his effectiveness during the season. He returned in force for the postseason, again pacing the Monarchs as they marched to the Finals. In 1996, Berger briefly halted his playing career to take over as the head coach for the West Palm Beach Barracudas. He did so in part to give his knee a chance to recover and because the Barracudas' regular head coach, Bill Nyrop, had been diagnosed with terminal cancer. He surrendered the reigns midseason and returned to the ECHL, however, because the Monarchs franchise had been promoted to the AHL, Berger joined the Charlotte Checkers. He played well at the end of the regular season but, as was his want, he turned up his scoring in the playoffs. He led all players with 10 goals and 27 points, helping the Checkers run through the postseason without a loss and capture the Riley Trophy.

The following year, Berger ended up playing for five different teams in three different leagues, ending up on the El Paso Buzzards. He won the inaugural WPHL championship, again as a major contributor in the playoffs, and retired after the season. Berger returned two years later when the ECHL returned to Greensboro in the form of the Generals. He lasted just 5 scoreless games before retiring for good as the league's all-time leading scorer in the postseason. He was inducted into the ECHL Hall of Fame in 2011.

== Statistics ==
=== Regular season and playoffs ===
| | | | Regular Season | | | | | Playoffs |
| Season | Team | League | GP | G | A | Pts | PIM | GP | G | A | Pts | PIM |
|---|---|---|---|---|---|---|---|---|---|---|---|---|
| 1982–83 | Paddock Pool Saints | GLJHL | 45 | 29 | 44 | 73 | 52 | — | — | — | — | — |
| 1983–84 | Stratford Cullitons | MWJHL | 38 | 55 | 55 | 110 | 101 | — | — | — | — | — |
| 1984–85 | Stratford Cullitons | MWJHL | 37 | 43 | 52 | 95 | 102 | — | — | — | — | — |
| 1985–86 | Northern Michigan | WCHA | 21 | 5 | 2 | 7 | 20 | — | — | — | — | — |
| 1986–87 | Northern Michigan | WCHA | 24 | 11 | 10 | 21 | 6 | — | — | — | — | — |
| 1987–88 | Northern Michigan | WCHA | 38 | 40 | 32 | 72 | 22 | — | — | — | — | — |
| 1988–89 | Northern Michigan | WCHA | 44 | 30 | 33 | 63 | 24 | — | — | — | — | — |
| 1989–90 | Fort Wayne Komets | IHL | 3 | 2 | 2 | 4 | 2 | — | — | — | — | — |
| 1989–90 | Greensboro Monarchs | ECHL | 46 | 38 | 44 | 82 | 119 | 10 | 11 | 3 | 14 | 32 |
| 1990–91 | Halifax Citadels | AHL | 4 | 1 | 0 | 1 | 0 | — | — | — | — | — |
| 1990–91 | Greensboro Monarchs | ECHL | 44 | 22 | 34 | 56 | 112 | 13 | 11 | 11 | 22 | 17 |
| 1991–92 | Greensboro Monarchs | ECHL | 60 | 60 | 70 | 130 | 158 | 11 | 8 | 13 | 21 | 56 |
| 1991–92 | Fort Wayne Komets | IHL | — | — | — | — | — | 4 | 3 | 3 | 6 | 0 |
| 1992–93 | Muskegon Fury | CoHL | 4 | 4 | 7 | 11 | 2 | — | — | — | — | — |
| 1992–93 | Fort Wayne Komets | IHL | 8 | 2 | 5 | 7 | 14 | — | — | — | — | — |
| 1992–93 | Greensboro Monarchs | ECHL | 45 | 33 | 42 | 75 | 135 | 1 | 1 | 1 | 2 | 26 |
| 1993–94 | Cornwall Aces | AHL | 2 | 2 | 1 | 3 | 0 | — | — | — | — | — |
| 1993–94 | Greensboro Monarchs | ECHL | 68 | 56 | 83 | 139 | 118 | 8 | 3 | 5 | 8 | 12 |
| 1994–95 | Detroit Falcons | CoHL | 15 | 11 | 15 | 26 | 29 | — | — | — | — | — |
| 1994–95 | Schalker Haie 87 | Germany2 | 2 | 0 | 1 | 1 | 2 | — | — | — | — | — |
| 1994–95 | Greensboro Monarchs | ECHL | 40 | 23 | 27 | 50 | 114 | 17 | 6 | 17 | 23 | 46 |
| 1995–96 | Charlotte Checkers | ECHL | 23 | 10 | 14 | 24 | 80 | 16 | 10 | 17 | 27 | 32 |
| 1996–97 | San Antonio Dragons | IHL | 4 | 0 | 0 | 0 | 0 | — | — | — | — | — |
| 1996–97 | Charlotte Checkers | ECHL | 12 | 5 | 13 | 18 | 24 | — | — | — | — | — |
| 1996–97 | Raleigh IceCaps | ECHL | 20 | 3 | 19 | 22 | 20 | — | — | — | — | — |
| 1996–97 | Hampton Roads Admirals | ECHL | 2 | 1 | 2 | 3 | 2 | — | — | — | — | — |
| 1996–97 | El Paso Buzzards | WPHL | 4 | 4 | 5 | 9 | 6 | 9 | 8 | 7 | 15 | 18 |
| 1999–00 | Greensboro Generals | ECHL | 5 | 0 | 0 | 0 | 10 | — | — | — | — | — |
| ECHL totals | | | 365 | 251 | 348 | 599 | 892 | 76 | 50 | 67 | 117 | 221 |
| CoHL totals | | | 19 | 15 | 22 | 37 | 31 | — | — | — | — | — |
| IHL totals | | | 15 | 4 | 7 | 11 | 16 | 4 | 3 | 3 | 6 | 0 |

== Awards and honors ==
| Award | Year |
|---|---|
| All-WCHA First Team | 1987–88 |
| AHCA West Second-Team All-American | 1987–88 |
| All-WCHA Second team | 1988–89 |
| WCHA All-Tournament Team | 1989 |
| ECHL Riley Cup | 1990 |
| ECHL Second Team All-Star | 1991–92 |
| ECHL First Team All-Star | 1993–94 |
| ECHL Riley Cup | 1996 |
| WPHL President's Cup | 1997 |

Awards and achievements
| Preceded by Stan Drulia | ECHL Most Valuable Player; 1991–92 | Succeeded by Trevor Jobe |
