= 1984–85 IHL season =

North American ice hockey season

The 1984–85 IHL season was the 40th season of the International Hockey League, a North American minor professional league. Nine teams participated in the regular season, and the Peoria Rivermen won the Turner Cup.

== Regular season ==
East Division	GP	W	L	T	GF	GA	Pts
Peoria Rivermen	82	48	25	9	357	275	105
Flint Generals	82	43	35	4	349	340	93
Kalamazoo Wings	82	40	35	7	323	297	89
Toledo Goaldiggers	82	32	45	5	292	362	72

West Division	GP	W	L	T	GF	GA	Pts
Muskegon Lumberjacks	82	50	29	3	374	291	103
Fort Wayne Komets	82	37	34	11	339	327	90
Salt Lake Golden Eagles	82	35	39	8	332	323	82
Indianapolis Checkers	82	31	47	4	264	318	69
Milwaukee Admirals	82	25	52	5	292	389	60

== Turner Cup-Playoffs ==
Turner-Cup-Quarterfinals
E1	Peoria Rivermen	4
W4	Indianapolis Checkers	3
W2	Fort Wayne Komets	4
W3	Salt Lake Golden Eagles	3
W1	Muskegon Lumberjacks	4
E4	Toledo Goaldiggers	2
E2	Flint Generals	3
E3	Kalamazoo Wings	4

Turner-Cup-Semifinals
E1	Peoria Rivermen	4
W2	Fort Wayne Komets	2
W1	Muskegon Lumberjacks	4
E3	Kalamazoo Wings	0

Turner-Cup-Final
E1	Peoria Rivermen	4
W1	Muskegon Lumberjacks	3
