= Corrie D'Alessio =

Canadian ice hockey player

- Born: September 9, 1969 (age 56) Cornwall, Ontario, Canada
- Height: 5 ft 11 in (180 cm)
- Weight: 155 lb (70 kg; 11 st 1 lb)
- Position: Goaltender
- Caught: Left
- Played for: Hartford Whalers
- NHL draft: 107th overall, 1988; Vancouver Canucks
- Playing career: 1991–1994

Corrie Vince D'Alessio (born September 9, 1969) is a Canadian former professional ice hockey goaltender who played in one National Hockey League game for the Hartford Whalers during the 1992–93 NHL season.

D'Alessio played 11 minutes of the Whalers 9–3 loss to the Buffalo Sabres on the 11th of December 1992, saving the 3 shots that were directed at him.

== Career statistics ==
=== Regular season and playoffs ===
| | | | Regular season | | | | | | | | | Playoffs |
| Season | Team | League | GP | W | L | T | MIN | GA | SO | GAA | SV% | GP | W | L | MIN | GA | SO | GAA | SV% |
|---|---|---|---|---|---|---|---|---|---|---|---|---|---|---|---|---|---|---|---|
| 1985–86 | Pembroke Lumber Kings | CJHL | 20 | 14 | 3 | 0 | 982 | 59 | 0 | 3.60 | — | — | — | — | — | — | — | — | — |
| 1986–87 | Pembroke Lumber Kings | CJHL | 25 | 15 | 6 | 0 | 1327 | 95 | 0 | 4.30 | — | — | — | — | — | — | — | — | — |
| 1987–88 | Cornell University | ECAC | 25 | 17 | 8 | 0 | 1457 | 67 | 0 | 2.76 | .910 | — | — | — | — | — | — | — | — |
| 1988–89 | Cornell University | ECAC | 29 | 15 | 13 | 1 | 1684 | 96 | 1 | 3.42 | .886 | — | — | — | — | — | — | — | — |
| 1989–90 | Cornell University | ECAC | 16 | 6 | 7 | 2 | 887 | 50 | 0 | 3.38 | .878 | — | — | — | — | — | — | — | — |
| 1990–91 | Cornell University | ECAC | 24 | 10 | 8 | 3 | 1160 | 67 | 0 | 3.47 | .871 | — | — | — | — | — | — | — | — |
| 1991–92 | Milwaukee Admirals | IHL | 27 | 9 | 14 | 2 | 1435 | 96 | 0 | 4.01 | — | 2 | 0 | 2 | 119 | 12 | 0 | 6.05 | — |
| 1992–93 | Hartford Whalers | NHL | 1 | 0 | 0 | 0 | 11 | 0 | 0 | 0.00 | 1.000 | — | — | — | — | — | — | — | — |
| 1992–93 | Springfield Indians | AHL | 23 | 3 | 13 | 2 | 1120 | 77 | 0 | 4.13 | .853 | 4 | 1 | 0 | 75 | 3 | 0 | 2.40 | — |
| 1993–94 | Las Vegas Thunder | IHL | 1 | 1 | 0 | 0 | 35 | 1 | 0 | 1.70 | .941 | — | — | — | — | — | — | — | — |
| NHL totals | | | 1 | 0 | 0 | 0 | 11 | 0 | 0 | 0.00 | 1.000 | — | — | — | — | — | — | — | — |

== Awards and honors ==
| Award | Year |
|---|---|
| All-ECAC Hockey Rookie Team | 1987–88 |

== See also ==
- List of players who played only one game in the NHL
