= Phil Berger =

Phil or Philip Berger may refer to:

- Phil Berger (politician) (born 1952), member of the North Carolina General Assembly
- Phil Berger Jr. (born 1972), American attorney and jurist, son of the above
- Phil Berger (ice hockey) (born 1966), American ice hockey player and coach
