= NCAA Division I Men's Ice Hockey Scoring Champion =

NCAA Scoring Champion
- Sport: Ice hockey
- Awarded for: To the player with the most points scored during the season.

History
- First award: 1948
- Most recent: Jack Devine, (Denver) (57 points)

The NCAA Scoring Champion is the player who scored the most points in official NCAA games over the course of the season. Because the NCAA does not have a set standard number of games that each team must play, the scoring champion skews towards some teams rather than others (The Ivy League teams, for instance, do not start their seasons until almost a month after the official start of the NCAA season). Additionally, points scored in both conference and league tournament games are included, slanting the scoring titles towards players on teams that perform the best in the postseason.

Several Players have won the league scoring title multiple times but only Phil Latreille has led the NCAA in scoring three separate times. Impressively, Latreille did so by averaging more than 4 points per game in each of the three seasons.

== Award winners ==
Year	Winner	Pos	School	Gms	PTS
1947–48	Gordon McMillan	F	Michigan	23	62
1948–49	Bill Riley	F	Dartmouth	–	78
1949–50	Jack Garrity	F	Boston University	–	84
1950–51	Neil Celley	LW	Michigan	27	79
1951–52	Frank Chiarelli	F	Rensselaer	18	79
1952–53	John Mayasich	C	Minnesota	27	78
1953–54	John Mayasich	C	Minnesota	28	78
1954–55	Bill Cleary	F	Harvard	21	89
1955–56	Ed Rowe	C	Clarkson	23	65
1956–57	Bob Cleary	C	Harvard	26	73
1956–57	Bill Hay	C	Colorado College	30	73
1957–58	Bill Hay	C	Colorado College	30	80
1958–59	Phil Latreille	C	Middlebury	20	90
1959–60	Phil Latreille	C	Middlebury	22	96
1960–61	Phil Latreille	C	Middlebury	21	108
1961–62	Ron Ryan	RW	Colby	–	104
1962–63	Tom Roe	C	Williams	21	78
1963–64	Jerry Knightley	F	Rensselaer	26	75
1964–65	John Cunniff	LW	Boston College	27	67
1965–66	Doug Ferguson	C	Cornell	27	71
1966–67	Jerry York	F	Boston College	28	67
1966–67	Herb Wakabayashi	C	Boston University	31	67
1967–68	Delbert Dehate	C	Wisconsin	31	77
1968–69	David Merhar	F	Army	28	107
1969–70	Tim Sheehy	C	Boston College	24	68
1970–71	Louis Frigon	C	New Hampshire	29	86
1971–72	Dave Skalko	C	Air Force	31	76
1972–73	Rick Kennedy	F	Saint Louis	38	96
1973–74	Steve Colp	C	Michigan State	38	97
1974–75	Tom Ross	C	Michigan State	40	97
1975–76	Tom Ross	C	Michigan State	41	105
1976–77	Dave Taylor	RW	Clarkson	34	108
1977–78	Mike Eaves	F	Wisconsin	43	89
1978–79	Mark Johnson	C	Wisconsin	40	90
1979–80	Bill Joyce	F	Northern Michigan	40	96
1980–81	Aaron Broten	C	Minnesota	45	106
1981–82	Ed Beers	LW	Denver	42	84
1982–83	Brian Hills	F	Bowling Green	40	94
1983–84	Paul Pooley	F	Ohio State	42	96
1984–85	Bill Watson	RW	Minnesota−Duluth	46	109
1985–86	Dan Dorion	RW	Western Michigan	42	104
1986–87	Tony Hrkac	C	North Dakota	48	116
1987–88	Steve Johnson	F	North Dakota	42	85
1987–88	Dave Capuano	LW	Maine	42	85
1987–88	Paul Polillo	C	Western Michigan	42	85

Year	Winner	Pos	School	Gms	PTS
1988–89	Bobby Reynolds	RW	Michigan State	47	77
1988–89	Kip Miller	LW	Michigan State	47	77
1989–90	Kip Miller	LW	Michigan State	44	101
1990–91	Scott Beattie	C	Northern Michigan	46	89
1991–92	Denny Felsner	LW	Michigan	44	94
1992–93	Paul Kariya	LW	Maine	39	100
1993–94	Dean Fedorchuk	C	Alaska–Fairbanks	38	74
1993–94	Tavis MacMillan	C	Alaska–Fairbanks	38	74
1994–95	Brendan Morrison	C	Michigan	39	76
1995–96	Martin St. Louis	RW	Vermont	35	85
1995–96	Éric Perrin	C	Vermont	38	85
1996–97	Brendan Morrison	C	Michigan	43	88
1997–98	Marty Reasoner	C	Boston College	42	73
1998–99	Jason Krog	C	New Hampshire	41	85
1999–00	Steven Reinprecht	C	Wisconsin	37	66
2000–01	Jeff Panzer	C	North Dakota	46	81
2001–02	John Pohl	C	Minnesota	44	79
2002–03	Peter Sejna	LW	Colorado College	42	82
2003–04	Junior Lessard	F	Minnesota–Duluth	45	63
2004–05	Marty Sertich	C	Colorado College	43	64
2005–06	Ryan Potulny	C	Minnesota	41	63
2006–07	T. J. Hensick	C	Michigan	41	69
2007–08	Nathan Gerbe	C	Boston College	43	68
2008–09	Bryan Leitch	LW	Quinnipiac	39	59
2009–10	Gustav Nyquist	RW	Maine	39	61
2010–11	Andy Miele	C	Miami	39	71
2011–12	Spencer Abbott	LW	Maine	39	62
2012–13	Rylan Schwartz	C	Colorado College	41	53
2013–14	Johnny Gaudreau	LW	Boston College	40	80
2014–15	Jack Eichel	C	Boston University	40	71
2015–16	Kyle Connor	LW	Michigan	38	71
2016–17	Zach Aston-Reese	F	Northeastern	38	63
2016–17	Mike Vecchione	F	Union	38	63
2016–17	Tyler Kelleher	RW	New Hampshire	40	63
2017–18	Adam Gaudette	C	Northeastern	38	60
2018–19	Taro Hirose	LW	Michigan State	36	50
2018–19	Alex Limoges	C	Penn State	39	50
2019–20	Jack Dugan	F	Providence	34	52
2020–21	Cole Caufield	RW	Wisconsin	31	52
2021–22	Bobby Brink	RW	Denver	41	57
2022–23	Adam Fantilli	C	Michigan	36	65
2023–24	Will Smith	C	Boston College	41	71
2024–25	Jack Devine	RW	Denver	44	57

=== Winners by school ===
School	Winners
Michigan	8
Boston College	7
Michigan State	7
Minnesota	5
Wisconsin	5
Colorado College	4
Maine	4
Boston University	3
Denver	3
Middlebury	3
New Hampshire	3
North Dakota	3
Alaska	2
Clarkson	2
Harvard	2
Minnesota–Duluth	2
Northeastern	2
Northern Michigan	2
Rensselaer	2
Vermont	2
Western Michigan	2
Air Force	1
Army	1
Bowling Green	1
Colby	1
Cornell	1
Dartmouth	1
Miami	1
Ohio State	1
Penn State	1
Providence	1
Quinnipiac	1
Saint Louis	1
Union	1
Williams	1

=== Winners by position ===
Position	Winners
Center	44
Right wing	11
Left wing	14
Forward	18

=== Multiple Winners ===
Player	Wins
Phil Latreille	3
Bill Hay	2
John Mayasich	2
Kip Miller	2
Brendan Morrison	2
Tom Ross	2

== See also ==
College ice hockey statistics
