= Brian Dowd =

Canadian ice hockey player

- Born: August 27, 1965 (age 60) Hamilton, Ontario, Canada
- Height: 6 ft 0 in (183 cm)
- Weight: 190 lb (86 kg; 13 st 8 lb)
- Position: Defence
- Shot: Left
- Played for: Northeastern; Fort Wayne Komets
- NHL draft: 1988 NHL Supplemental Draft; Edmonton Oilers
- Playing career: 1984–1989

Brian Dowd (born August 27, 1965) is a Canadian former professional ice hockey defenseman who was an All-American for Northeastern.

== Career ==
Dowd began attending Northeastern University in 1984. His first two seasons with the ice hockey team were unspectacular but he did show some improvement. Dowd came into his own beginning in his junior season, tripling his point production. He continued his elevated play as a senior and was named an All-American. He helped the Huskies finish second in Hockey East and win the conference tournament. Northeastern made just its second tournament appearance, however, the team suffered an ignominious fate by being the only team in history to lose to a Division III program in history. Despite the less than happy ending to his college career, Dowd was selected by the Edmonton Oilers in the Supplemental Draft and signed a professional contract. He spent the next season with the Fort Wayne Komets, playing well. Dowd was second in scoring from the blueline but decided to retire after the year.

Dowd later moved to the Buffalo area and became a distributor for DePuy. He continued to work in sales and became an executive for Hologic in 2010, a position he holds as of 2021.

== Statistics ==
=== Regular season and playoffs ===
			Regular Season					Playoffs
Season	Team	League	GP	G	A	Pts	PIM	GP	G	A	Pts	PIM
1982–83	Hamilton Mountain A's	OJHL	44	0	10	10	88	—	—	—	—	—
1983–84	Hamilton Mountain A's	OJHL	30	4	24	28	77	—	—	—	—	—
1984–85	Northeastern	Hockey East	26	0	3	3	44	—	—	—	—	—
1985–86	Northeastern	Hockey East	24	1	8	9	36	—	—	—	—	—
1986–87	Northeastern	Hockey East	34	8	13	21	40	—	—	—	—	—
1987–88	Northeastern	Hockey East	37	6	21	27	52	—	—	—	—	—
1988–89	Fort Wayne Komets	IHL	62	9	24	33	39	6	0	3	3	8
OJHL totals			74	4	34	38	165	—	—	—	—	—
NCAA totals			121	15	45	60	172	—	—	—	—	—

== Awards and honors ==
Award	Year
All-Hockey East First Team	1987–88
AHCA East Second-Team All-American	1987–88
Hockey East All-Tournament Team	1988
