= Bobby Reynolds (ice hockey) =

American ice hockey player (born 1967)

- Born: July 14, 1967 (age 58) Flint, Michigan, U.S.
- Height: 5 ft 11 in (180 cm)
- Weight: 175 lb (79 kg; 12 st 7 lb)
- Position: Left wing
- Shot: Left
- Played for: Toronto Maple Leafs; HC Courmaosta; Klagenfurter AC; EC Ratingen; Lausanne HC; Revier Löwen Oberhausen; ZSC Lions
- NHL draft: 190th overall, 1985; Toronto Maple Leafs
- Playing career: 1989–2007

Robert DeHart Reynolds (born July 14, 1967) is an American former professional ice hockey winger who played seven games in the National Hockey League (NHL) for the Toronto Maple Leafs during the 1989–90 season. The rest of his career, which lasted from 1989 to 2007, was mainly spent in the minor leagues.

== Early life ==
He was born in Flint, MI. As a youth, he played in the 1980 Quebec International Pee-Wee Hockey Tournament with a minor ice hockey team from Detroit.

== Career ==
During his National Hockey League career, Reynolds played seven games for the Toronto Maple Leafs.

== Career statistics ==
=== Regular season and playoffs ===
			Regular season					Playoffs
Season	Team	League	GP	G	A	Pts	PIM	GP	G	A	Pts	PIM
1983–84	St. Clair Falcons	GLJHL	60	25	34	59	—	—	—	—	—	—
1984–85	St. Clair Falcons	NAHL	43	20	30	50	—	—	—	—	—	—
1985–86	Michigan State University	CCHA	45	9	10	19	26	—	—	—	—	—
1986–87	Michigan State University	CCHA	40	20	13	33	40	—	—	—	—	—
1987–88	Michigan State University	CCHA	46	42	25	67	52	—	—	—	—	—
1988–89	Michigan State University	CCHA	47	36	41	77	78	—	—	—	—	—
1989–90	Toronto Maple Leafs	NHL	7	1	1	2	0	—	—	—	—	—
1989–90	Newmarket Saints	AHL	66	22	28	50	55	—	—	—	—	—
1990–91	Newmarket Saints	AHL	65	24	22	46	59	—	—	—	—	—
1990–91	Baltimore Skipjacks	AHL	14	4	9	13	8	6	2	2	4	10
1991–92	Baltimore Skipjacks	AHL	53	12	18	30	39	—	—	—	—	—
1991–92	Kalamazoo Wings	IHL	13	8	10	18	19	12	5	4	9	4
1992–93	ECD Sauerland	GER-2	45	54	69	123	97	—	—	—	—	—
1993–94	ECD Sauerland	GER-2	52	45	47	92	84	—	—	—	—	—
1994–95	HC Courmaosta	ALP	16	15	24	39	4	—	—	—	—	—
1994–95	HC Courmaosta	ITA	16	9	14	23	6	—	—	—	—	—
1994–95	Klagenfurter AC	AUT	—	—	—	—	—	—	—	—	—	—
1995–96	EC Ratingen	DEL	50	44	36	80	44	—	—	—	—	—
1995–96	Lausanne HC	NLA	—	—	—	—	—	—	—	—	—	—
1996–97	EC Ratingen	DEL	50	22	18	40	59	—	—	—	—	—
1997–98	Revier Löwen Oberhausen	DEL	28	9	14	23	12	—	—	—	—	—
1997–98	ZSC Lions	NLA	11	4	5	9	2	—	—	—	—	—
1998–99	Detroit Vipers	IHL	67	21	20	41	60	10	2	4	6	6
1998–99	Flint Generals	UHL	4	4	2	6	0	—	—	—	—	—
1999–00	Houston Aeros	IHL	51	13	21	34	21	11	3	0	3	10
1999–00	Flint Generals	UHL	32	22	37	59	18	—	—	—	—	—
2000–01	Houston Aeros	IHL	80	15	31	46	61	7	1	2	3	6
2001–02	Flint Generals	UHL	74	45	59	104	40	5	3	3	6	2
2002–03	Flint Generals	UHL	73	35	62	97	88	—	—	—	—	—
2003–04	Flint Generals	UHL	76	35	81	116	54	3	2	3	5	2
2004–05	Flint Generals	UHL	79	31	72	103	30	—	—	—	—	—
2006–07	Flint Generals	UHL	66	23	37	60	27	6	0	4	4	6
UHL totals			404	195	350	545	257	14	5	10	15	10
NHL totals			7	1	1	2	0	—	—	—	—	—

=== International ===
Year	Team	Event	GP	G	A	Pts	PIM
1987	United States	WJC	7	3	3	6	8
1990	United States	WC	7	3	3	6	8
Junior totals			7	3	3	6	8
Senior totals			10	0	2	2	18

== Awards and honors ==
Award	Year
CCHA All-Tournament Team	1987
All-CCHA Second team	1987–88
CCHA All-Tournament Team	1988
All-CCHA Second team	1988–89
AHCA West First-Team All-American	1988–89
CCHA All-Tournament Team	1989

Awards and achievements
Preceded by Bill Horn	CCHA Most Valuable Player in Tournament; 1987	Succeeded by Paul Connell
Preceded by Steve Johnson/Dave Capuano/Paul Polillo	NCAA Ice Hockey Scoring Champion; 1988–89 (with Kip Miller)	Succeeded by Kip Miller
