= Dean Anderson (ice hockey) =

Canadian ice hockey player (born 1966)

- Born: July 14, 1966 (age 59) Oshawa, Ontario, Canada
- Height: 5 ft 10 in (178 cm)
- Weight: 165 lb (75 kg; 11 st 11 lb)
- Position: Goaltender
- Caught: Left
- Played for: Wisconsin; Newmarket Saints; Flint Spirits; Knoxville Cherokees
- NHL draft: 1988 NHL Supplemental Draft; Toronto Maple Leafs
- Playing career: 1984–1992

Dean Anderson (born July 14, 1966) is a Canadian former ice hockey goaltender who was an All-American for Wisconsin.

== Career ==
Anderson began attending the University of Wisconsin–Madison in 1984 and became the ice hockey team's starting goaltender as a freshman. In his sophomore season, Anderson shared the starting role with Mike Richter, a future NHLer, and was relegated to backup duties as a junior. Richter left after 1987 to pursue a professional career, leaving Anderson a chance to reclaim the primary job. Anderson was tremendous in his final season, setting a program record with 30 wins and being named an All-American. Anderson led the team to the WCHA Championship and was named Tournament MVP, the first time the award was ever given. Wisconsin won their first round match in the NCAA Tournament but fell in the quarterfinal round.

Because of his spectacular renaissance, Anderson was selected by the Toronto Maple Leafs in the 1988 Supplemental Draft and joined the team's farm system the following year. Anderson didn't have much success in 1989, allowing more than 6 goals per game in what few appearances he was allowed. He showed a marked improvement the following year, but it was in 1991 when it appeared he had caught on to the professional game. Anderson led the Knoxville Cherokees to a regular season ECHL title, boasting the best save percentage in the league. He was named a First-Team All-Star and even got a brief recall to the Newmarket Saints. Unfortunately, Anderson had a terrible season in 1992, seeing his goals against average balloon to more than five and a half goal per game. He retired after the season.

== Statistics ==
=== Regular season and playoffs ===
			Regular season									Playoffs
Season	Team	League	GP	W	L	T	MIN	GA	SO	GAA	SV%	GP	W	L	MIN	GA	SO	GAA	SV%
1982–83	Markham Waxers	OJHL	25	—	—	—	—	—	—	—	—	—	—	—	—	—	—	—	—
1983–84	Markham Waxers	OJHL	39	11	11	1	1322	110	1	4.99	—	—	—	—	—	—	—	—	—
1984–85	Wisconsin	WCHA	36	21	13	0	2071	148	0	4.20	.875	—	—	—	—	—	—	—	—
1985–86	Wisconsin	WCHA	20	13	6	0	1128	80	0	4.25	.861	—	—	—	—	—	—	—	—
1986–87	Wisconsin	WCHA	9	4	2	0	409	27	0	3.96	.874	—	—	—	—	—	—	—	—
1987–88	Wisconsin	WCHA	45	30	13	2	2718	148	2	3.27	.898	—	—	—	—	—	—	—	—
1988–89	Newmarket Saints	AHL	2	0	1	0	38	4	0	6.32	.800	1	—	—	—	—	—	—	—
1988–89	Flint Spirits	IHL	16	1	12	0	770	82	1	6.39	—	—	—	—	—	—	—	—	—
1989–90	Knoxville Cherokees	ECHL	17	6	8	3	997	73	0	4.39	.890	—	—	—	—	—	—	—	—
1990–91	Newmarket Saints	AHL	3	1	2	0	180	16	0	5.33	.835	—	—	—	—	—	—	—	—
1990–91	Knoxville Cherokees	ECHL	29	23	3	2	1625	80	3	2.95	.909	3	0	3	0	—	—	—	—
1991–92	Knoxville Cherokees	ECHL	37	9	20	5	2004	188	0	5.63	.855	—	—	—	—	—	—	—	—
NCAA totals			110	68	34	2	6326	403	2	3.82	.882	—	—	—	—	—	—	—	—
ECHL totals			83	38	31	10	4626	341	3	4.42	.880	—	—	—	—	—	—	—	—
AHL totals			5	1	3	0	218	20	0	5.50	.829	—	—	—	—	—	—	—	—

== Awards and honors ==
Award	Year
All-WCHA Second Team	1987–88
AHCA West Second-Team All-American	1987–88
WCHA All-Tournament Team	1988
ECHL First-Team All-Star	1990–91

Awards and achievements
Preceded by Award Created	WCHA Most Valuable Player in Tournament; 1988	Succeeded by Bill Pye
