= Paul Polillo =

Canadian ice hockey player

- Born: April 24, 1967 (age 58) Brantford, Ontario, Canada
- Height: 5 ft 11 in (180 cm)
- Weight: 178 lb (81 kg; 12 st 10 lb)
- Position: Centre
- Shot: Left
- Played for: Brantford Smoke; Denver Grizzlies; Port Huron Border Cats
- NHL draft: 1988 NHL Supplemental Draft; Pittsburgh Penguins
- Playing career: 1990–2006

Paul Polillo (born April 24, 1967) is a Canadian former professional ice hockey player. He played in the Colonial Hockey League (later renamed the United Hockey League) for nine seasons, winning the UHL Most Valuable Player Award three years in succession.

== Playing career ==
Born in Brantford, Ontario, Polillo played college hockey with Western Michigan University from 1986 until 1990, and was drafted by the Pittsburgh Penguins in the 1988 NHL Supplemental Draft. After college, he played professionally in Italy with Latemor for two seasons. In 1992, he joined the Brantford Smoke of the Colonial league, where he played until 1998, with one tryout with the Denver Grizzlies in 1994–95. He then played three seasons with the Port Huron Border Cats, before retiring from professional hockey. He then played in Ontario Hockey Association senior league play with the Dundas Real McCoys and the Brantford Blast before retiring from competitive hockey in 2006.

== Awards and honours ==
Award	Year
All-CCHA First Team	1987-88
UHL Most Sportsmanlike Player	1992-93
UHL Most Sportsmanlike Player	1993-94
UHL Most Sportsmanlike Player	1994-95
UHL MVP Award	1994-95
UHL MVP Award	1995-96
UHL MVP Award	1996-97

Awards and achievements
Preceded by Tony Hrkac	NCAA Ice Hockey Scoring Champion; 1987–88 With Steve Johnson and Dave Capuano	Succeeded by Bobby Reynolds/Kip Miller
