= 1988 NHL supplemental draft =

Player selection draft

General information
- Date(s): June 10, 1988

Overview
- 26 total selections in 2 rounds
- First selection: (United States) Mike McHugh (Minnesota North Stars)

The 1988 NHL supplemental draft was the third NHL supplemental draft. It was held on June 10, 1988.

== Selections by round ==
=== Round one ===
The first round was limited to teams that missed the 1988 Stanley Cup playoffs.

Pick #	Player	Nationality	NHL team	College (league)
1	Mike McHugh (LW)	United States	Minnesota North Stars	University of Maine (Hockey East)
2	Andy Gribble (F)	Canada	Vancouver Canucks	Bowling Green State University (CCHA)
3	Phil Berger (RW)	United States	Quebec Nordiques	Northern Michigan University (WCHA)
4	Paul Polillo (C)	Canada	Pittsburgh Penguins	Western Michigan University (CCHA)
5	Mike Hurlbut (D)	United States	New York Rangers	Saint Lawrence University (ECAC)

=== Round two ===
Pick #	Player	Nationality	NHL team	College (league)
6	Dave Schofield (D)	United States	Minnesota North Stars	Merrimack College (ECAC East)
7	Steve McKichan (G)	Canada	Vancouver Canucks	Miami University (CCHA)
8	Jamie Baker (C)	Canada	Quebec Nordiques	Saint Lawrence University (ECAC)
9	Shawn Lillie (C)	Canada	Pittsburgh Penguins	Colgate University (ECAC)
10	Ron Lecinskas (D)	United States	New York Rangers	Salem State College (ECAC East)
11	Dean Anderson (G)	Canada	Toronto Maple Leafs	University of Wisconsin (WCHA)
12	Sean Fitzgerald (LW)	United States	Los Angeles Kings	SUNY Oswego (ECAC West)
13	Todd Wolf (D)	United States	Chicago Blackhawks	Colgate University (ECAC)
14	Mike McNeill (LW)	United States	St. Louis Blues	University of Notre Dame (NCAA)
15	Mike O'Neill (G)	Canada	Winnipeg Jets	Yale University (ECAC)
16	Todd Krygier (LW)	United States	Hartford Whalers	University of Connecticut (ECAC East)
17	Tim Budy (LW)	Canada	New Jersey Devils	Colorado College (WCHA)
18	Clark Davies (D)	United States	Buffalo Sabres	Ferris State University (CCHA)
19	Paul Connell (G)	United States	Philadelphia Flyers	Bowling Green State University (CCHA)
20	Harry Mews (F)	Canada	Washington Capitals	Northeastern University (Hockey East)
21	Doug Melnyk (D)	Canada	New York Islanders	Western Michigan University (CCHA)
22	Gary Shuchuk (C)	Canada	Detroit Red Wings	University of Wisconsin (WCHA)
23	Chris Harvey (G)	United States	Boston Bruins	Brown University (ECAC)
24	Brian Dowd (D)	Canada	Edmonton Oilers	Northeastern University (Hockey East)
25	Peter Fish (G)	United States	Montreal Canadiens	Boston University (Hockey East)
26	Jerry Tarrant (D)	United States	Calgary Flames	University of Vermont (ECAC)

== See also ==
- 1988 NHL entry draft
- 1988–89 NHL season
- List of NHL players
