= Mike DeAngelis (ice hockey) =

Italian ice hockey player

- Born: 27 January 1966 (age 60) Kamloops, British Columbia, Canada
- Height: 5 ft 11 in (180 cm)
- Weight: 190 lb (86 kg; 13 st 8 lb)
- Position: Defenseman
- Caught: Left
- Played for: Minnesota–Duluth; Kalamazoo Wings; HC Fiemme Cavalese; HC Devils Milano; HC Lugano; HC 24 Milan; Reno Rage; Nottingham Panthers; Tacoma Sabercats; Adler Mannheim; IC Gentofte; Phoenix Mustangs; HC La Chaux-de-Fonds; Milano Vipers; Augsburger Panther
- National team: Italy
- Playing career: 1984–2002
- Coaching career

Current position
- Title: Head Coach
- Team: Phoenix Jr. Coyotes

Biographical details
- Education: University of Minnesota Duluth

Coaching career (HC unless noted)
- 2003–2008: Arizona State
- 2008–2010: P. F. Chang's U18
- 2010–2012: Phoenix Jr. Coyotes U16
- 2012–2013: Phoenix Jr. Coyotes U18
- 2013–2017: Arizona Jr. Coyotes
- 2017 – present: Phoenix Jr. Coyotes U15
- 2017–2018: Everett Silvertips (scout)
- 2018 – present: Kamloops Blazers (scout)
- 2019 – present: Arizona Coyotes (scout)

Michael DeAngelis (born 27 January 1966) is a Canadian-born, Italian ice hockey coach, scout and former player. He competed in the men's tournaments at the 1992 Winter Olympics, the 1994 Winter Olympics and the 1998 Winter Olympics for Italy.

== Statistics ==
=== International ===
| Year | Team | Event | Result | GP | G | A | Pts | PIM |
|---|---|---|---|---|---|---|---|---|
| 1991 | Italy | WC-B | 1st | 7 | 0 | 2 | 2 | 4 |
| 1992 | Italy | WC | 9th | 5 | 1 | 0 | 1 | 0 |
| 1992 | Italy | OG | 12th | 7 | 0 | 1 | 1 | 20 |
| 1993 | Italy | WC | 8th | 6 | 0 | 2 | 2 | 4 |
| 1994 | Italy | WC | 6th | 6 | 0 | 3 | 3 | 0 |
| 1994 | Italy | OG | 9th | 7 | 0 | 0 | 0 | 2 |
| 1995 | Italy | WC | 7th | 6 | 0 | 0 | 0 | 0 |
| 1996 | Italy | WC | 7th | 6 | 0 | 0 | 0 | 4 |
| 1997 | Italy | WC | 8th | 8 | 0 | 2 | 2 | 14 |
| 1998 | Italy | WC | 10th | 3 | 0 | 0 | 0 | 0 |
| 1998 | Italy | OG | 12th | 4 | 0 | 2 | 2 | 4 |
| 1999 | Italy | WC | 13th | 3 | 0 | 1 | 1 | 0 |
| 2000 | Italy | WC-Q2 | 1st | 3 | 1 | 1 | 2 | 0 |
| 2000 | Italy | OG-Q1 | 2nd | 4 | 0 | 2 | 2 | 4 |
| 2001 | Italy | WC | 12th | 6 | 2 | 1 | 3 | 2 |
| World Championship totals | | | | 56 | 3 | 11 | 14 | 28 |
| Olympic Games totals | | | | 18 | 0 | 3 | 3 | 26 |

== Awards and honors ==
| Award | Year |
|---|---|
| All-WCHA First Team | 1987–88 |
| AHCA West Second-Team All-American | 1987–88 |
