= 1988 Hockey East men's ice hockey tournament =

1988 Hockey East Men's ice hockey tournament
- Dates: March 4–14, 1988
- Teams: 6
- Finals site: Boston Garden; Boston, Massachusetts
- Champions: Northeastern (1st title)
- Winning coach: Fernie Flaman (1st title)
- MVP: Bruce Racine (Northeastern)
- Hockey East Men's Ice Hockey Tournaments

The 1988 Hockey East Men's Ice Hockey Tournament was the 4th tournament in the history of the conference. It was played between March 3 and March 11, 1988. Quarterfinal and semifinal games were played at home team campus sites, while the final game was played at the Boston Garden in Boston, Massachusetts, the home venue of the NHL's Boston Bruins. This was the final year the Hockey East championship was decided at a home venue to one of its member teams (as of 2014). By winning the tournament, Northeastern received the Hockey East's automatic bid to the 1988 NCAA Division I Men's Ice Hockey Tournament.

== Format ==
The tournament featured three rounds of play. The team that finishes in seventh place is ineligible for tournament play. In the quarterfinals, the third seed and sixth seeds, and the fourth seed and fifth seeds played a two-game series where the team that scored the most total goals was declared the winner and advanced to the semifinals. In the semifinals, the first seed and lowest remaining quarterfinalist and second seed and highest remaining quarterfinalist each play additional two-game series with the winners advancing to the single-elimination championship game. The tournament champion receives an automatic bid to the 1988 NCAA Division I Men's Ice Hockey Tournament.

== Conference standings ==
Note: GP = Games played; W = Wins; L = Losses; T = Ties; PTS = Points; GF = Goals For; GA = Goals Against

1987–88 Hockey East standings
	Conference							Overall					
	GP	W	L	T	PTS	GF	GA	GP	W	L	T	GF	GA
Maine†	26	20	4	2	44	159	90	44	34	8	2	259	144
Northeastern*	26	13	9	4	30	115	107	38	21	13	4	155	142
Boston University	26	11	12	3	25	116	117	34	14	17	3	150	154
Lowell	26	12	14	0	24	111	119	39	20	17	2	165	166
Boston College	26	10	14	2	22	104	119	34	13	18	3	132	151
Providence	26	8	13	5	21	97	119	36	13	18	5	135	165
New Hampshire	26	6	18	2	14	86	128	30	7	20	3	101	146
Championship: Northeastern † indicates conference regular season champion * indicates conference tournament champion

== Bracket ==
Teams are reseeded after the quarterfinals

Quarterfinals; March 4–5
3	Boston University	2	4
6	Providence	3	6
4	Lowell	3	5
5	Boston College	3	2

Semifinals; March 8–10
1	Maine	6	11
6	Providence	5	2
2	Northeastern	3	1
4	Lowell	1	2

Championship; March 14
1	Maine	3
2	Northeastern	4

Note: * denotes overtime period(s)

=== Quarterfinals ===
==== (3) Boston University vs. (6) Providence ====
March 4	Boston University	2 – 3	Providence	Walter Brown Arena

March 5	Boston University	4 – 6	Providence	Walter Brown Arena

Providence won series 9–6

==== (4) Lowell vs. (5) Boston College ====
March 4	Lowell	3 – 3	Boston College	Tully Forum

March 5	Lowell	5 – 2	Boston College	Tully Forum

Lowell won series 8–5

=== Semifinals ===
==== (1) Maine vs. (6) Providence ====
March 8	Maine	6 – 5	Providence	Alfond Arena

March 9	Maine	11 – 2	Providence	Alfond Arena

Maine won series 17–7

==== (2) Northeastern vs. (4) Lowell ====
March 9	Northeastern	3 – 1	Lowell	Matthews Arena

March 10	Northeastern	1 – 2	Lowell	Matthews Arena

Northeastern won series 4–3

=== Championship ===
==== (1) Maine vs. (2) Northeastern ====
March 14	Maine	3 – 4	Northeastern	Boston Garden

== Tournament awards ==
=== All-Tournament Team ===
- F Mike McHugh (Maine)
- F Harry Mews (Northeastern)
- F Rico Rossi (Northeastern)
- F Mario Thyer (Maine)
- D Jack Capuano (Maine)
- D Brian Dowd (Northeastern)
- G Bruce Racine* (Northeastern)

* Tournament MVP(s)
