= San Antonio Dragons =

- City: San Antonio, Texas
- League: IHL
- Conference: Western
- Division: Midwest
- Founded: 1982
- Operated: 1996–1998
- Home arena: Freeman Coliseum
- Colors: Black, white, silver, and green

Franchise history
- 1982–1984: Peoria Prancers
- 1984–1996: Peoria Rivermen
- 1996–1998: San Antonio Dragons

The San Antonio Dragons were a minor league professional ice hockey team in the International Hockey League (IHL) for two seasons in 1996–97 and 1997–98. The Dragons were based in San Antonio, Texas, and played at the Freeman Coliseum and occasionally the Alamodome.

The franchise was previously known as the Peoria Rivermen. The team was co-owned by Bruce Saurs, who owned the Rivermen franchise and had been planning on folding the IHL franchise due to financial losses, and Don Levin, the co-owner of the Chicago Wolves, and relocated the franchise to San Antonio even though Freeman Coliseum was already home to a Central Hockey League (CHL) team, the San Antonio Iguanas. The team then hired the Iguanas' former general manager Jim Goodman as general manager and the Iguanas' head coach John Torchetti as an assistant coach.

For the first month of the 1996–97 season, the Dragons wore temporary white with green trim and logo (home) and black with green and white trim and logo (road) jerseys because the new jerseys had not come in yet. The Dragons won the division championship in their first season in San Antonio.

Although the Iguanas were established, the Dragons drew more fans than the Iguanas and also captured a larger share of the corporate support of San Antonio, leading to the Iguanas losing their lease for the 1997–98 season. Following an overhaul of the front office and the loss of Torchetti, the Dragons floundered in their second season by finishing in last place in the league. At the end of the season, ownership relinquished its lease at the coliseum following losses of about $7 million over the two seasons. The lease was then given back to the Iguanas who returned to the CHL for the 1998–99 season.

== Notable players ==
- Dave Archibald
- Len Barrie
- Mike Craig
- Davis Payne
- Grigorijs Pantelejevs
- Daniel Shank
- Joe Kocur
- Louie DeBrusk
- Bruce Racine
