= 1988–89 IHL season =

North American ice hockey season

The 1988–89 IHL season was the 44th season of the International Hockey League, a North American minor professional league. The regular season included ten teams. The Muskegon Lumberjacks won the Turner Cup.

== Regular season ==
East Division	GP	W	L	T	OTL	GF	GA	Pts
Muskegon Lumberjacks	82	57	18	0	7	433	308	121
Saginaw Hawks	82	46	26	0	10	378	294	102
Fort Wayne Komets	82	46	30	0	6	293	274	98
Kalamazoo Wings	82	39	36	0	7	345	350	85
Flint Spirits	82	22	54	0	6	287	428	50

West Division	GP	W	L	T	OTL	GF	GA	Pts
Salt Lake Golden Eagles	82	56	22	0	4	369	294	116
Milwaukee Admirals	82	54	23	0	5	399	323	113
Denver Rangers	82	33	42	0	7	323	394	73
Peoria Rivermen	82	31	42	0	9	339	383	71
Indianapolis Ice	82	26	54	0	2	312	430	54

== Turner Cup-Playoffs ==
Turner Cup-Quarterfinals
1	Muskegon Lumberjacks	4
8	Peoria Rivermen	0
4	Saginaw Hawks	2
5	Fort Wayne Komets	4
2	Salt Lake Golden Eagles	4
7	Denver Rangers	0
3	Milwaukee Admirals	4
6	Kalamazoo Wings	2

Turner Cup-Semifinals
1	Muskegon Lumberjacks	4
5	Fort Wayne Komets	1
2	Salt Lake Golden Eagles	4
3	Milwaukee Admirals	1

Turner Cup-Final
1	Muskegon Lumberjacks	4
2	Salt Lake Golden Eagles	1
