= 1987–88 NCAA Division I men's ice hockey season =

NCAA Hockey Season

- Duration: October 1987– April 2, 1988
- NCAA tournament: 1988
- National championship: Olympic Center; Lake Placid, New York
- NCAA champion: Lake Superior State
- Hobey Baker Award: Robb Stauber (Minnesota)

The 1987–88 NCAA Division I men's ice hockey season began in October 1987 and concluded with the 1988 NCAA Division I Men's Ice Hockey Tournament's championship game on April 2, 1988 at the Olympic Center in Lake Placid, New York. This was the 41st season in which an NCAA ice hockey championship was held and is the 94th year overall where an NCAA school fielded a team.

After the season U.S. International would drop its hockey program (the school itself would eventually go bankrupt) causing the demise of the Great West Hockey Conference, the only principally west-coast conference in the history of Division I hockey.

== Season Outlook ==
=== Pre-season polls ===
The top teams in the nation as ranked before the start of the season.

The WMPL poll was voted on by coaches. The College Hockey Statistics Bureau (CHSB) / WMEB poll was voted on by media.

WMPL Poll
| Rank | Team |
|---|---|
| 1 | Denver (8) |
| 2 | Minnesota |
| 3 | Western Michigan |
| 4 | Michigan State |
| 5 | North Dakota (1) |
| 6 | Wisconsin |
| 7 | Maine (1) |
| 8 | Bowling Green |
| 9 | Lowell |
| 10 | St. Lawrence |

CHSB / WMEB Poll
| Rank | Team |
|---|---|
| 1 | Denver (5) |
| 2 | Maine (2) |
| 3 | Minnesota (1) |
| 4 | St. Lawrence |
| 5 | Michigan State |
| 6 | Lowell |
| 7 | Harvard |
| 8 | Bowling Green |
| 9 | North Dakota (1) |
| 10 | Colgate |

== Regular season ==
=== Season tournaments ===
| Tournament | Dates | Teams | Champion |
|---|---|---|---|
| Cardinal Classic | November 6–7 | 4 | Army |
| Rensselaer Holiday Tournament | November 27–28 | 4 | Rensselaer |
| Dexter Shoe Classic | December 27–28 | 4 | Bowling Green |
| Long Island Classic | December 27–28 | 4 | Boston College |
| Auld Lang Syne Classic | December 29–30 | 4 | Vermont |
| Great Lakes Invitational | December 29–30 | 4 | Wisconsin |
| Syracuse Invitational | December 29–30 | 4 | Clarkson |
| Riverfront Invitational | January 2–3 | 4 | Western Michigan |
| Yale Hockey Classic | January 2–3 | 4 | Cornell |
| Beanpot | February 1, 8 | 4 | Northeastern |

=== Standings ===
1987–88 American Collegiate Hockey Association standings
| | Conference | | | | | | | Overall | | | | | |
| | GP | W | L | T | PTS | GF | GA | GP | W | L | T | GF | GA |
|---|---|---|---|---|---|---|---|---|---|---|---|---|---|
| Michigan–Dearborn † | 12 | 10 | 1 | 1 | 20 | - | - | 42 | 25 | 14 | 3 | - | - |
| Notre Dame * | 12 | 7 | 3 | 2 | 16 | 60 | 44 | 33 | 27 | 4 | 2 | 222 | 114 |
| Lake Forest | 12 | 4 | 7 | 2 | 10 | 48 | 58 | 26 | 13 | 12 | 1 | 130 | 99 |
| Kent State | 12 | 0 | 10 | 2 | 2 | - | - | 40 | 11 | 26 | 3 | - | - |
Championship: March 5, 1988 † indicates division regular season champion * indicates conference tournament champion

1987–88 Central Collegiate Hockey Association standings
| | Conference | | | | | | | Overall | | | | | |
| | GP | W | L | T | PTS | GF | GA | GP | W | L | T | GF | GA |
|---|---|---|---|---|---|---|---|---|---|---|---|---|---|
| Lake Superior State† | 32 | 22 | 4 | 6 | 50 | 163 | 97 | 46 | 33 | 7 | 6 | 233 | 139 |
| Bowling Green* | 32 | 19 | 11 | 2 | 40 | 190 | 144 | 45 | 30 | 13 | 2 | 258 | 188 |
| Michigan State | 32 | 18 | 11 | 3 | 39 | 151 | 123 | 46 | 27 | 16 | 3 | 222 | 173 |
| Western Michigan | 32 | 17 | 12 | 3 | 37 | 152 | 136 | 42 | 22 | 17 | 3 | 208 | 184 |
| Michigan | 32 | 17 | 15 | 0 | 34 | 140 | 131 | 41 | 22 | 19 | 0 | 176 | 171 |
| Illinois-Chicago | 32 | 14 | 17 | 1 | 29 | 137 | 138 | 39 | 18 | 20 | 1 | 170 | 169 |
| Ferris State | 32 | 11 | 17 | 4 | 26 | 118 | 165 | 40 | 15 | 20 | 5 | 155 | 198 |
| Ohio State | 32 | 7 | 21 | 4 | 18 | 116 | 178 | 40 | 10 | 24 | 6 | 138 | 209 |
| Miami | 32 | 7 | 24 | 1 | 15 | 113 | 168 | 38 | 12 | 25 | 1 | 145 | 187 |
Championship: Bowling Green † indicates conference regular season champion * indicates conference tournament champion

1987–88 ECAC Hockey standings
| | Conference | | | | | | | Overall | | | | | |
| | GP | W | L | T | PTS | GF | GA | GP | W | L | T | GF | GA |
|---|---|---|---|---|---|---|---|---|---|---|---|---|---|
| Harvard† | 22 | 18 | 4 | 0 | 36 | 93 | 52 | 32 | 21 | 11 | 0 | 132 | 96 |
| St. Lawrence†* | 22 | 18 | 4 | 0 | 36 | 124 | 70 | 38 | 29 | 9 | 0 | 200 | 112 |
| Cornell | 22 | 15 | 7 | 0 | 30 | 98 | 68 | 28 | 19 | 9 | 0 | 121 | 81 |
| Vermont | 22 | 14 | 7 | 1 | 29 | 81 | 67 | 35 | 21 | 11 | 3 | 127 | 101 |
| Colgate | 22 | 13 | 8 | 1 | 27 | 105 | 63 | 32 | 18 | 11 | 3 | 156 | 104 |
| Clarkson | 22 | 10 | 9 | 3 | 23 | 86 | 82 | 35 | 17 | 15 | 3 | 133 | 125 |
| Princeton | 22 | 11 | 10 | 1 | 23 | 80 | 77 | 28 | 12 | 15 | 1 | 94 | 110 |
| Rensselaer | 22 | 9 | 13 | 0 | 18 | 99 | 91 | 32 | 15 | 17 | 0 | 164 | 125 |
| Dartmouth | 22 | 8 | 13 | 1 | 17 | 59 | 84 | 26 | 10 | 15 | 1 | 70 | 98 |
| Yale | 22 | 6 | 16 | 0 | 12 | 60 | 97 | 26 | 6 | 20 | 0 | 76 | 128 |
| Army | 22 | 3 | 17 | 2 | 8 | 59 | 119 | 30 | 9 | 19 | 2 | 97 | 151 |
| Brown | 22 | 2 | 19 | 1 | 5 | 46 | 120 | 26 | 3 | 22 | 1 | 63 | 144 |
Championship: St. Lawrence † indicates conference regular season champion * indicates conference tournament champion

1987–88 Great West Hockey Conference standings
| | Conference | | | | | | | Overall | | | | | |
| | GP | W | L | T | PTS | GF | GA | GP | W | L | T | GF | GA |
|---|---|---|---|---|---|---|---|---|---|---|---|---|---|
| Alaska–Fairbanks† | 8 | 5 | 3 | 0 | 10 | - | - | 31 | 20 | 9 | 2 | 172 | 115 |
| US International | 8 | 4 | 4 | 0 | 8 | - | - | 36 | 23 | 13 | 0 | 152 | 126 |
| Alaska–Anchorage | 8 | 3 | 5 | 0 | 6 | 36 | 34 | 36 | 18 | 15 | 3 | 170 | 121 |
† indicates conference regular season champion

1987–88 Hockey East standings
| | Conference | | | | | | | Overall | | | | | |
| | GP | W | L | T | PTS | GF | GA | GP | W | L | T | GF | GA |
|---|---|---|---|---|---|---|---|---|---|---|---|---|---|
| Maine† | 26 | 20 | 4 | 2 | 44 | 159 | 90 | 44 | 34 | 8 | 2 | 259 | 144 |
| Northeastern* | 26 | 13 | 9 | 4 | 30 | 115 | 107 | 38 | 21 | 13 | 4 | 155 | 142 |
| Boston University | 26 | 11 | 12 | 3 | 25 | 116 | 117 | 34 | 14 | 17 | 3 | 150 | 154 |
| Lowell | 26 | 12 | 14 | 0 | 24 | 111 | 119 | 39 | 20 | 17 | 2 | 165 | 166 |
| Boston College | 26 | 10 | 14 | 2 | 22 | 104 | 119 | 34 | 13 | 18 | 3 | 132 | 151 |
| Providence | 26 | 8 | 13 | 5 | 21 | 97 | 119 | 36 | 13 | 18 | 5 | 135 | 165 |
| New Hampshire | 26 | 6 | 18 | 2 | 14 | 86 | 128 | 30 | 7 | 20 | 3 | 101 | 146 |
Championship: Northeastern † indicates conference regular season champion * indicates conference tournament champion

1987–88 NCAA Division I Independent ice hockey standings
| | Conference | | | | | | | Overall | | | | | |
| | GP | W | L | T | PTS | GF | GA | GP | W | L | T | GF | GA |
|---|---|---|---|---|---|---|---|---|---|---|---|---|---|
| Air Force | 0 | 0 | 0 | 0 | - | - | - | 29 | 15 | 14 | 0 | 133 | 118 |
| Alabama–Huntsville | 0 | 0 | 0 | 0 | - | - | - | 30 | 11 | 18 | 1 | 139 | 159 |
| St. Cloud State | 0 | 0 | 0 | 0 | - | - | - | 37 | 11 | 25 | 1 | 131 | 231 |

1987–88 Western Collegiate Hockey Association standings
| | Conference | | | | | | | Overall | | | | | |
| | GP | W | L | T | PTS | GF | GA | GP | W | L | T | GF | GA |
|---|---|---|---|---|---|---|---|---|---|---|---|---|---|
| Minnesota† | 35 | 28 | 7 | 0 | 56 | 167 | 107 | 44 | 34 | 10 | 0 | 209 | 125 |
| Wisconsin* | 35 | 22 | 12 | 1 | 45 | 163 | 125 | 45 | 30 | 13 | 2 | 205 | 161 |
| Denver | 35 | 19 | 14 | 2 | 40 | 169 | 152 | 39 | 20 | 17 | 2 | 184 | 170 |
| Michigan Tech | 35 | 19 | 15 | 1 | 39 | 165 | 158 | 41 | 20 | 20 | 1 | 189 | 188 |
| North Dakota | 35 | 16 | 18 | 1 | 33 | 147 | 140 | 42 | 21 | 20 | 1 | 174 | 160 |
| Minnesota-Duluth | 35 | 15 | 18 | 2 | 32 | 143 | 155 | 41 | 18 | 21 | 2 | 163 | 179 |
| Northern Michigan | 35 | 14 | 17 | 4 | 32 | 145 | 147 | 40 | 16 | 20 | 4 | 164 | 159 |
| Colorado College | 35 | 3 | 31 | 1 | 7 | 102 | 206 | 38 | 4 | 33 | 1 | 111 | 222 |
Championship: Wisconsin † indicates conference regular season champion * indicates conference tournament champion

=== Final regular season polls ===
The final top 10 teams as ranked by coaches (WMPL) before the conference tournament finals.

The final media poll (CHSB/WDOM) was released after the conference tournament finals.

WMPL Coaches Poll
| Ranking | Team |
|---|---|
| 1 | Minnesota (7) |
| 2 | Lake Superior State |
| 3 | Maine (3) |
| 4 | St. Lawrence |
| 5 | Wisconsin |
| 6 | Bowling Green |
| 7 | Northeastern |
| 8 | Denver |
| (tie) | Harvard |
| 10 | Cornell |

CHSB / WMEB Media Poll
| Ranking | Team |
|---|---|
| 1 | Minnesota (8) |
| 2 | Maine (3) |
| 3 | Lake Superior State |
| 4 | Wisconsin |
| 5 | Harvard |
| 6 | St. Lawrence |
| 7 | Bowling Green |
| 8 | Michigan State |
| 9 | Northeastern |
| 10 | Vermont |

== 1988 NCAA Tournament ==
First round March 18–20
W4 | Bowling Green | 5 | 5 | 10
E5 | Vermont | 1 | 1 | 2
E3 | Northeastern | 5 | 3 | 8
W6 | Merrimack | 3 | 7 | 10
E4 | Harvard | 5 | 3 | 8
W5 | Michigan State | 6 | 5 | 11
W3 | Wisconsin | 7 | 4 | 11
E6 | Lowell | 1 | 4 | 5

Quarterfinals; March 25–27
E1 | Maine | 5 | 4 | 9
W4 | Bowling Green | 1 | 3 | 4
W2 | Lake Superior State | 3 | 5 | 8
W6 | Merrimack | 4 | 0 | 4
W1 | Minnesota | 4 | 4 | 8
W5 | Michigan State | 2 | 3 | 5
E2 | St. Lawrence | 7 | 3 | 10
W3 | Wisconsin | 0 | 4 | 4

Frozen Four; March 31-April 1
E1 | Maine | 3
W2 | Lake Superior State | 6
W1 | Minnesota | 2
E2 | St. Lawrence | 3

National Championship; April 2
W2 | Lake Superior State | 4*
E2 | St. Lawrence | 3
Third-place game
E1 | Maine | 5
W1 | Minnesota | 2

Note: * denotes overtime period(s)

== Player stats ==
=== Scoring leaders ===
The following players led the league in points at the conclusion of the season.

GP = Games played; G = Goals; A = Assists; Pts = Points; PIM = Penalty minutes

| Player | Class | Team | GP | G | A | Pts | PIM |
|---|---|---|---|---|---|---|---|
| Steve Johnson | Senior | North Dakota | 42 | 34 | 51 | 85 | 28 |
| Dave Capuano | Sophomore | Maine | 42 | 34 | 51 | 85 | 51 |
| Paul Polillo | Sophomore | Western Michigan | 42 | 25 | 60 | 85 | 34 |
| Keith Street | Junior | Alaska–Fairbanks | 31 | 37 | 46 | 83 | 30 |
| Nelson Emerson | Sophomore | Bowling Green | 45 | 34 | 49 | 83 | 54 |
| Mark Vermette | Junior | Lake Superior State | 46 | 45 | 30 | 75 | 154 |
| Mike Golden | Senior | Maine | 44 | 31 | 44 | 75 | 46 |
| Greg Parks | Junior | Bowling Green | 45 | 30 | 44 | 74 | 86 |
| Phil Berger | Junior | Northern Michigan | 38 | 40 | 32 | 72 | 22 |
| Mike McNeill | Senior | Notre Dame | 32 | 28 | 44 | 72 | 12 |

=== Leading goaltenders ===
The following goaltenders led the league in goals against average at the end of the regular season while playing at least 33% of their team's total minutes.

GP = Games played; Min = Minutes played; W = Wins; L = Losses; OT = Overtime/shootout losses; GA = Goals against; SO = Shutouts; SV% = Save percentage; GAA = Goals against average

| Player | Class | Team | GP | Min | W | L | OT | GA | SO | SV% | GAA |
|---|---|---|---|---|---|---|---|---|---|---|---|
| Bruce Hoffort | Freshman | Lake Superior State | 31 | 1787 | 23 | 4 | 3 | 79 | 2 | .909 | 2.65 |
| Robb Stauber | Sophomore | Minnesota | 44 | 2621 | 34 | 10 | 0 | 119 | 5 | .913 | 2.72 |
| Mike Millham | Freshman | Vermont | 18 | 1054 | 11 | 5 | 1 | 48 | - | .885 | 2.73 |
| Corrie D'Alessio | Freshman | Cornell | 25 | 1457 | 17 | 8 | 0 | 67 | 0 | .910 | 2.76 |
| Paul Cohen | Junior | St. Lawrence | 30 | 1707 | 22 | 7 | 0 | 80 | 2 | .903 | 2.78 |
| Wayne Cowley | Junior | Colgate | 20 | 1162 | 11 | 7 | 1 | 58 | 1 | - | 2.99 |
| Scott King | Sophomore | Maine | 33 | 1762 | 25 | 5 | 1 | 91 | 0 | .896 | 3.10 |
| Chad Meyhoff | Sophomore | Alaska-Anchorage | - | - | - | - | - | - | 1 | .885 | 3.16 |
| John Fletcher | Sophomore | Clarkson | 33 | 1820 | 16 | 11 | 3 | 97 | 1 | .908 | 3.20 |
| Dean Anderson | Senior | Wisconsin | 45 | 2718 | 30 | 13 | 2 | 148 | 2 | .898 | 3.27 |

== Awards ==
=== NCAA ===
| Award | | Recipient |
|---|---|---|
| Hobey Baker Memorial Award | | Robb Stauber, Minnesota |
| Spencer Penrose Award | | Frank Anzalone, Lake Superior State |
| Most Outstanding Player in NCAA Tournament | | Bruce Hoffort, Lake Superior State |
AHCA All-American Teams
| East First Team | Position | West First Team |
| Bruce Racine, Northeastern | G | Robb Stauber, Minnesota |
| Jack Capuano, Maine | D | Scott Paluch, Bowling Green |
| Brian McColgan, St. Lawrence | D | Paul Stanton, Wisconsin |
| Réjean Boivin, Colgate | F | Steve Johnson, North Dakota |
| Dave Capuano, Maine | F | Paul Ranheim, Wisconsin |
| Pete Lappin, St. Lawrence | F | Mark Vermette, Lake Superior State |
| East Second Team | Position | West Second Team |
| John Fletcher, Clarkson | G | Dean Anderson, Wisconsin |
| Brian Dowd, Northeastern | D | Mike DeAngelis, Minnesota-Duluth |
| Don Sweeney, Harvard | D | Randy Skarda, Minnesota |
| Luciano Borsato, Clarkson | F | Phil Berger, Northern Michigan |
| Gord Cruickshank, Providence | F | Nelson Emerson, Bowling Green |
| Mike Golden, Maine | F | Steve Tuttle, Wisconsin |
| Mike McHugh, Maine | F | |

=== CCHA ===
| Awards | | Recipient |
|---|---|---|
| Player of the Year | | Mark Vermette, Lake Superior State |
| Rookie of the Year | | John DePourcq, Ferris State |
| Coach of the Year | | Frank Anzalone, Lake Superior State |
| Most Valuable Player in Tournament | | Paul Connell, Bowling Green |
All-CCHA Teams
| First Team | Position | Second Team |
| Bruce Hoffort, Lake Superior State | G | Jason Muzzatti, Michigan State |
| Tim Tilley, Michigan State | D | Kord Cernich, Lake Superior State |
| Scott Paluch, Bowling Green | D | Mike Posma, Western Michigan |
| | D | Barry McKinlay, Illinois-Chicago |
| Mark Vermette, Lake Superior State | F | Mike de Carle, Lake Superior State |
| Nelson Emerson, Bowling Green | F | Bobby Reynolds, Michigan State |
| Paul Polillo, Western Michigan | F | Ron Hoover, Western Michigan |

=== ECAC ===
| Award | | Recipient |
|---|---|---|
| Player of the Year | | Pete Lappin, St. Lawrence |
| Rookie of the Year | | Trent Andison, Cornell |
| Coach of the Year | | Bill Cleary, Harvard |
| | | Mike Gilligan, Vermont |
| Most Outstanding Player in Tournament | | Pete Lappin, St. Lawrence |
All-ECAC Hockey Teams
| First Team | Position | Second Team |
| John Fletcher, Clarkson | G | Steve Laurin, Dartmouth |
| Brian McColgan, St. Lawrence | D | Chris Norton, Cornell |
| Don Sweeney, Harvard | D | Hank Lammens, St. Lawrence |
| Pete Lappin, St. Lawrence | F | Luciano Borsato, Clarkson |
| Réjean Boivin, Colgate | F | Ian Boyce, Vermont |
| John Messuri, Princeton | F | Kyle McDonough, Vermont |
| Rookie Team | Position | |
| Corrie D'Alessio, Cornell | G | |
| Mark Salsbury, Princeton | G | |
| Andy Cesarski, Princeton | D | |
| Steve Poapst, Colgate | D | |
| Dave Tretowicz, Clarkson | D | |
| Stephane Venne, Vermont | D | |
| Trent Andison, Cornell | F | |
| Peter Ciavaglia, Harvard | F | |
| Bruce Coles, Rensselaer | F | |
| Joé Juneau, Rensselaer | F | |
| John LeClair, Vermont | F | |
| Rob Tobin, Army | F | |

=== Hockey East ===
| Award | | Recipient |
|---|---|---|
| Player of the Year | | Mike McHugh, Maine |
| Rookie of the Year | | Mario Thyer, Maine |
| Coach of the Year Award | | Shawn Walsh, Maine |
| William Flynn Tournament Most Valuable Player | | Bruce Racine, Northeastern |
All-Hockey East Teams
| First Team | Position | Second Team |
| Scott King, Maine | G | David Littman, Boston College |
| Jack Capuano, Maine | D | Carl Valimont, Lowell |
| Brian Dowd, Northeastern | D | Claude Lodin, Northeastern |
| Mike McHugh, Maine | F | Mike Golden, Maine |
| Dave Capuano, Maine | F | Mike Kelfer, Boston University |
| David O'Brien, Northeastern | F | Dan Shea, Boston College |
| Rookie Team | Position | |
| Pat Morrison, New Hampshire | G | |
| Will Averill, Northeastern | D | |
| Tom Dion, Boston University | D | |
| David Emma, Boston College | F | |
| Mario Thyer, Maine | F | |
| Chris Winnes, New Hampshire | F | |

=== WCHA ===
| Award | | Recipient |
|---|---|---|
| Most Valuable Player | | Robb Stauber, Minnesota |
| Freshman of the Year | | Rick Berens, Denver |
| Goaltender of the Year | | Robb Stauber, Minnesota |
| Student-Athlete of the Year | | Steve Johnson, North Dakota |
| Coach of the Year | | Herb Boxer, Michigan Tech |
| Most Valuable Player in Tournament | | Dean Anderson, Wisconsin |
All-WCHA Teams
| First Team | Position | Second Team |
| Robb Stauber, Minnesota | G | Dean Anderson, Wisconsin |
| Mike DeAngelis, Minnesota-Duluth | D | Todd Richards, Minnesota |
| Randy Skarda, Minnesota | D | Paul Stanton, Wisconsin |
| Phil Berger, Northern Michigan | F | Steve Tuttle, Wisconsin |
| Paul Ranheim, Wisconsin | F | John Archibald, Michigan Tech |
| Steve Johnson, North Dakota | F | Daryn McBride, Denver |

== 1988 NHL entry draft ==
| Round | Pick | Player | College | Conference | NHL team |
|---|---|---|---|---|---|
| 1 | 9 | Rod Brind'Amour ^{†} | Michigan State | CCHA | St. Louis Blues |
| 1 | 21 | Jason Muzzatti | Michigan State | CCHA | Calgary Flames |
| 2 | 30 | Adrien Plavsic | New Hampshire | Hockey East | St. Louis Blues |
| 2 | 31 | Russ Romaniuk ^{†} | North Dakota | WCHA | Winnipeg Jets |
| 2 | 32 | Barry Richter ^{†} | Wisconsin | WCHA | Hartford Whalers |
| 2 | 35 | Pat Murray | Michigan State | CCHA | Philadelphia Flyers |
| 2 | 41 | Wade Bartley ^{†} | North Dakota | WCHA | Washington Capitals |
| 2 | 42 | Todd Harkins | Miami | CCHA | Calgary Flames |
| 3 | 43 | Shaun Kane ^{†} | Providence | Hockey East | Minnesota North Stars |
| 3 | 44 | Dane Jackson ^{†} | North Dakota | WCHA | Vancouver Canucks |
| 3 | 56 | Craig Fisher ^{†} | Miami | CCHA | Philadelphia Flyers |
| 3 | 57 | Duane Derksen ^{†} | Wisconsin | WCHA | Washington Capitals |
| 3 | 60 | Steve Heinze ^{†} | Boston College | Hockey East | Boston Bruins |
| 4 | 64 | Jeff Stolp ^{†} | Minnesota | WCHA | Minnesota North Stars |
| 4 | 65 | Matt Ruchty | Bowling Green | CCHA | New Jersey Devils |
| 4 | 68 | Tony Amonte ^{†} | Boston University | Hockey East | New York Rangers |
| 4 | 69 | Ted Crowley ^{†} | Boston College | Hockey East | Toronto Maple Leafs |
| 4 | 70 | Rob Blake | Bowling Green | CCHA | Los Angeles Kings |
| 4 | 72 | Jaan Luik | Miami | CCHA | St. Louis Blues |
| 4 | 74 | Dean Dyer | Lake Superior State | CCHA | Hartford Whalers |
| 4 | 75 | Scott Luik | Miami | CCHA | New Jersey Devils |
| 4 | 76 | Keith Carney ^{†} | Maine | Hockey East | Buffalo Sabres |
| 4 | 77 | Scott LaGrand ^{†} | Boston College | Hockey East | Philadelphia Flyers |
| 4 | 81 | Joé Juneau | Rensselaer | ECAC Hockey | Boston Bruins |
| 4 | 82 | Cam Brauer | Rensselaer | ECAC Hockey | Edmonton Oilers |
| 4 | 84 | Gary Socha ^{†} | Providence | Hockey East | Calgary Flames |
| 5 | 86 | Len Esau ^{†} | St. Cloud State | Independent | Toronto Maple Leafs |
| 5 | 87 | Stephane Venne | Vermont | ECAC Hockey | Quebec Nordiques |
| 5 | 88 | Greg Andrusak | Minnesota–Duluth | WCHA | Pittsburgh Penguins |
| 5 | 90 | Scott Matusovich ^{†} | Yale | ECAC Hockey | Calgary Flames |
| 5 | 91 | Jeff Robison ^{†} | Providence | Hockey East | Los Angeles Kings |
| 5 | 92 | Joe Cleary ^{†} | Boston College | Hockey East | Chicago Blackhawks |
| 5 | 95 | Scott Morrow ^{†} | New Hampshire | Hockey East | Hartford Whalers |
| 5 | 96 | Chris Nelson ^{†} | Wisconsin | WCHA | New Jersey Devils |
| 5 | 100 | Paul Rutherford | Ohio State | CCHA | New York Islanders |
| 5 | 102 | Dan Murphy ^{†} | Maine | Hockey East | Boston Bruins |
| 5 | 105 | Dave LaCouture ^{†} | Maine | Hockey East | St. Louis Blues |
| 6 | 106 | David DiVita | Lake Superior State | CCHA | Buffalo Sabres |
| 6 | 107 | Corrie D'Alessio | Cornell | ECAC Hockey | Vancouver Canucks |
| 6 | 108 | Ed Ward | Northern Michigan | WCHA | Quebec Nordiques |
| 6 | 113 | Justin Lafayette | Ferris State | CCHA | Chicago Blackhawks |
| 6 | 114 | Dan Fowler | Maine | Hockey East | St. Louis Blues |
| 6 | 117 | Chad Johnson ^{†} | North Dakota | WCHA | New Jersey Devils |
| 6 | 118 | Mike McLaughlin ^{†} | Vermont | ECAC Hockey | Buffalo Sabres |
| 6 | 119 | Gord Frantti ^{†} | Western Michigan | CCHA | Philadelphia Flyers |
| 6 | 121 | Jason Rathbone ^{†} | Boston College | Hockey East | New York Islanders |
| 6 | 122 | Phil von Stefenelli | Boston University | Hockey East | Vancouver Canucks |
| 6 | 123 | Derek Geary ^{†} | Dartmouth | ECAC Hockey | Boston Bruins |
| 7 | 128 | Dixon Ward ^{†} | North Dakota | WCHA | Vancouver Canucks |
| 7 | 132 | Matt Mallgrave ^{†} | Harvard | ECAC Hockey | Toronto Maple Leafs |
| 7 | 133 | Jeff Kruesel ^{†} | St. Cloud State | Independent | Los Angeles Kings |
| 7 | 134 | Craig Woodcroft | Colgate | ECAC Hockey | Chicago Blackhawks |
| 7 | 135 | Matt Hayes ^{†} | Lowell | Hockey East | St. Louis Blues |
| 7 | 137 | Kerry Russell | Michigan State | CCHA | Hartford Whalers |
| 7 | 138 | Chad Erickson ^{†} | Minnesota–Duluth | WCHA | New Jersey Devils |
| 7 | 140 | Jamie Cooke ^{†} | Colgate | ECAC Hockey | Philadelphia Flyers |
| 7 | 141 | Keith Jones ^{†} | Western Michigan | CCHA | Washington Capitals |
| 7 | 143 | Kelly Hurd | Michigan Tech | WCHA | Detroit Red Wings |
| 7 | 146 | Tim Chase ^{†} | Brown | ECAC Hockey | Montreal Canadiens |
| 8 | 148 | Ken MacArthur | Denver | WCHA | Minnesota North Stars |
| 8 | 149 | Greg Geldart ^{†} | North Dakota | WCHA | Vancouver Canucks |
| 8 | 151 | Jeff Blaeser ^{†} | Yale | ECAC Hockey | Pittsburgh Penguins |
| 8 | 155 | Chic Pojar | Colorado College | WCHA | Chicago Blackhawks |
| 8 | 158 | Jim Burke | Maine | Hockey East | Hartford Whalers |
| 8 | 159 | Bryan LaFort ^{†} | Boston University | Hockey East | New Jersey Devils |
| 8 | 160 | Dan Ruoho ^{†} | Northern Michigan | WCHA | Buffalo Sabres |
| 8 | 162 | Todd Hilditch ^{†} | Rensselaer | ECAC Hockey | Washington Capitals |
| 8 | 163 | Marty McInnis ^{†} | Boston College | Hockey East | New York Islanders |
| 8 | 164 | Brian McCormack ^{†} | Harvard | ECAC Hockey | Detroit Red Wings |
| 8 | 165 | Mark Krys ^{†} | Boston University | Hockey East | Boston Bruins |
| 8 | 166 | Shjon Podein | Minnesota–Duluth | WCHA | Edmonton Oilers |
| 8 | 167 | Sean Hill ^{†} | Wisconsin | WCHA | Montreal Canadiens |
| 9 | 169 | Travis Richards ^{†} | Minnesota | WCHA | Minnesota North Stars |
| 9 | 172 | Rob Gaudreau ^{†} | Providence | Hockey East | Pittsburgh Penguins |
| 9 | 173 | Shorty Forrest | St. Cloud State | Independent | New York Islanders |
| 9 | 174 | Mike Delay ^{†} | Boston College | Hockey East | Toronto Maple Leafs |
| 9 | 175 | Jim Larkin ^{†} | Vermont | ECAC Hockey | Los Angeles Kings |
| 9 | 178 | Mike Helber ^{†} | Michigan | CCHA | Winnipeg Jets |
| 9 | 179 | Mark Hirth | Michigan State | CCHA | Hartford Whalers |
| 9 | 185 | Jody Praznik | Colorado College | WCHA | Detroit Red Wings |
| 9 | 186 | Jon Rohloff ^{†} | Minnesota–Duluth | WCHA | Boston Bruins |
| 9 | 187 | Tom Cole ^{†} | Northeastern | Hockey East | Edmonton Oilers |
| 9 | 189 | Brett Petersen ^{†} | Denver | WCHA | Calgary Flames |
| 10 | 191 | Paul Constantin ^{†} | Lake Superior State | CCHA | Vancouver Canucks |
| 10 | 192 | Mark Sorensen | Michigan | CCHA | Washington Capitals |
| 10 | 195 | David Sacco ^{†} | Boston University | Hockey East | Toronto Maple Leafs |
| 10 | 198 | Bret Hedican | St. Cloud State | Independent | St. Louis Blues |
| 10 | 202 | Eric Fenton ^{†} | Maine | Hockey East | New York Rangers |
| 10 | 204 | Claudio Scremin | Maine | Hockey East | Washington Capitals |
| 10 | 205 | Jeff Kampersal ^{†} | Princeton | ECAC Hockey | New York Islanders |
| 11 | 211 | Grant Bischoff | Minnesota | WCHA | Minnesota North Stars |
| 11 | 214 | Cory Laylin ^{†} | Minnesota | WCHA | Pittsburgh Penguins |
| 11 | 216 | Mike Gregorio ^{†} | Kent State | ACHA | Toronto Maple Leafs |
| 11 | 217 | Doug Laprade | Lake Superior State | CCHA | Los Angeles Kings |
| 11 | 221 | Rob White | St. Lawrence | ECAC Hockey | Hartford Whalers |
| 11 | 222 | Chuckie Hughes ^{†} | Harvard | ECAC Hockey | New Jersey Devils |
| 11 | 223 | Tom Nieman ^{†} | Dartmouth | ECAC Hockey | Buffalo Sabres |
| 11 | 224 | Scott Billey ^{†} | Minnesota–Duluth | WCHA | Philadelphia Flyers |
| 11 | 225 | Chris Venkus | Western Michigan | CCHA | Washington Capitals |
| 11 | 226 | Phil Neururer ^{†} | Northern Michigan | WCHA | New York Islanders |
| 11 | 228 | Eric Reisman | Ohio State | CCHA | Boston Bruins |
| 11 | 229 | Darin MacDonald ^{†} | Boston University | Hockey East | Edmonton Oilers |
| 11 | 230 | Kevin Dahl | Bowling Green | CCHA | Montreal Canadiens |
| 11 | 231 | Dave Tretowicz | Clarkson | ECAC Hockey | Calgary Flames |
| 12 | 232 | Trent Andison | Cornell | ECAC Hockey | Minnesota North Stars |
| 12 | 238 | Joe Flanagan ^{†} | New Hampshire | Hockey East | Los Angeles Kings |
| 12 | 240 | Mike Francis | Harvard | ECAC Hockey | St. Louis Blues |
| 12 | 242 | Dan Slatalla ^{†} | Princeton | ECAC Hockey | Hartford Whalers |
| 12 | 244 | Bob Wallwork | Miami | CCHA | Buffalo Sabres |
| 12 | 246 | Ron Pascucci ^{†} | Boston College | Hockey East | Washington Capitals |
| 12 | 248 | Don Stone | Michigan | CCHA | Detroit Red Wings |

† incoming freshman

== See also ==
- 1987–88 NCAA Division III men's ice hockey season
