= Peoria Rivermen (IHL) =

- City: Peoria, Illinois
- League: International Hockey League
- Operated: 1982–1996
- Home arena: Carver Arena
- Colors: Blue, red, and yellow

Franchise history
- 1982–1984: Peoria Prancers
- 1984–1996: Peoria Rivermen
- 1996–1998: San Antonio Dragons

Championships
- Regular season titles: 2 (1984–85, 1990–91)
- Division titles: 4 (1984–85, 1990–91, 1993–94, 1994–95)
- Turner Cups: 2 (1985, 1991)

The Peoria Rivermen were an ice hockey team that played in the International Hockey League. They played in Peoria, Illinois at the Carver Arena. A new team with the Peoria Rivermen name currently competes in the Southern Professional Hockey League.

== History ==
The Peoria Rivermen were founded in 1982–83 in the International Hockey League, operating under owner Ken Wilson as the Peoria Prancers. The franchise was taken over by the Peoria Civic Center in 1984, which held a contest with the Peoria Journal Star newspaper to rename the team with Rivermen as the winner. The IHL's Peoria Rivermen began operations for the 1984–85 season and won the Turner Cup in their first season. They were bought by Bruce Saurs in the summer of 1989, and he owned the club for 19 seasons. Following several season of financial losses, Saurs sold 50% of the ownership in the IHL franchise in 1996 and relocated it as the San Antonio Dragons. Saurs then launched the Rivermen in the East Coast Hockey League (ECHL) beginning with the 1996–97 season.

They held professional hockey's longest winning streak at 18 games in 1991 until the Norfolk Admirals of the American Hockey League broke the record by winning 28 consecutive games in 2012.

Former owner Bruce Saurs died in July 2014.

The St. Louis Blues owe their "Towel Man" tradition to the Rivermen. According to the Towel Man himself, Ron Baechle, he and friend Monsignor Matthew Mitas attended a Rivermen game in 1990 where they saw their post-goal tradition, which Mitas suggested Baechle copy in St. Louis. It's been a Blues tradition ever since, even making its way into EA Sports's NHL Video Game Series.
