= 1989–90 IHL season =

North American ice hockey season

The 1989–90 IHL season was the 45th season of the International Hockey League, a North American minor professional league. Nine teams participated in the regular season, and the Indianapolis Ice won the Turner Cup.

== Regular season ==
East Division	GP	W	L	T	OTL	GF	GA	Pts
Muskegon Lumberjacks	82	55	21	0	6	389	304	116
Kalamazoo Wings	82	53	23	0	6	389	311	112
Flint Spirits	82	40	36	0	6	326	358	86
Fort Wayne Komets	82	37	34	0	11	316	345	85

West Division	GP	W	L	T	OTL	GF	GA	Pts
Indianapolis Ice	82	53	21	0	8	315	237	114
Salt Lake Golden Eagles	82	37	36	0	9	326	311	83
Milwaukee Admirals	82	36	39	0	7	316	370	79
Peoria Rivermen	82	31	38	0	13	317	378	75
Phoenix Roadrunners	82	27	44	0	11	314	394	65

== Turner Cup-Playoffs ==
Turner Cup-Quarterfinals
E1	Muskegon Lumberjacks	4
E4	Fort Wayne Komets	1
E2	Kalamazoo Wings	4
E3	Flint Spirits	0
W1	Indianapolis Ice	4
W4	Peoria Rivermen	1
W2	Salt Lake Golden Eagles	4
W3	Milwaukee Admirals	2

Turner Cup-Semifinals
E1	Muskegon Lumberjacks	4
E2	Kalamazoo Wings	2
W1	Indianapolis Ice	4
W2	Salt Lake Golden Eagles	1

Turner Cup-Final
E1	Muskegon Lumberjacks	0
W1	Indianapolis Ice	4
