= Muskegon Lumberjacks (1984–1992) =

- City: Muskegon
- League: International Hockey League
- Operated: 1960–1992
- Home arena: L. C. Walker Arena

Franchise history
- 1960–1965: Muskegon Zephyrs
- 1965–1984: Muskegon Mohawks
- 1984–1992: Muskegon Lumberjacks
- 1992–2001: Cleveland Lumberjacks

The Muskegon Lumberjacks were an International Hockey League (IHL) team based in Muskegon, Michigan.

== Facts ==
Founded: 1984–85 season
Arena: L.C. Walker Arena (capacity 5,100)
Uniform colors: black, white, and yellow
Logo design: crossed hockey sticks behind the word "Lumberjacks" and a portrait of a stereotypical lumberjack.
Division titles won: 6 (1984–85, 1985–86, 1986–87, 1988–89, 1989–90, 1991–92)
Regular season titles won: 3 (1987–88, 1988–89, 1989–90)
League championships won: 2 (1985–86, 1988–89)
Local Media: Muskegon Chronicle

== History ==
The Muskegon Mohawks franchise were purchased by Larry Gordon following the 1983–84 season for $1 and renamed the Lumberjacks following a name-the-team contest. The Lumberjacks name came from the high level of importance that the lumber industry had in Muskegon's history. The team moved to Cleveland, Ohio, in 1992 and was renamed the Cleveland Lumberjacks.

Market previously served by:

Muskegon Mohawks of the IHL (1965–84)

Franchise replaced by:

Muskegon Fury of the CoHL/UHL/IHL (1992–2008)
Muskegon Lumberjacks of the IHL (2008–10)
Muskegon Lumberjacks of the United States Hockey League (2010–present)

== Season-by-Season record ==
Note: GP = Games played, W = Wins, L = Losses, T = Ties, OTL = Overtime losses/Shootout losses, Pts = Points, GF = Goals for, GA = Goals against, PIM = Penalties in minutes

Season	GP	W	L	T	OTL	Pts	GF	GA	PIM	Regular season finish	Playoffs
1991–92	82	41	28	0	13	95	306	293	1782	2nd, East	Lost in Finals
1990–91	83	38	40	0	5	81	305	352	2115	4th, East	Lost in round 1
1989–90	82	55	21	0	6	116	389	304	2185	1st, East	Lost in Finals
1988–89	82	57	18	0	7	121	433	308	2606	1st, East	Won Turner Cup
1987–88	82	58	14	0	10	126	415	269	2817	1st, East	Lost in round 1
1986–87	82	47	30	5	0	99	366	286	2648	1st, East	Lost in Finals
1985–86	82	50	27	0	5	105	376	290	2244	1st, East	Won Turner Cup
1984–85	82	50	29	3	0	103	374	291	1708	2nd, League	Lost in Finals

== Team records ==
Note: Goaltending stats are incomplete during this period.

Goals: 62 Scott Gruhl (1984–85)
Assists: 82 Jock Callander (1986–87)
Points: 137 Dave Michayluk (1987–88)
Penalty Minutes: 450 Pat Mayer (1987–88)
Career Goals: 335 Dave Michayluk
Career Assists: 436 Jock Callander
Career Points: 769 Dave Michayluk
Career Penalty Minutes: 1452 Mitch Wilson
Career Games: 564 Dave Michayluk

== Notable NHL alumni ==
List of Muskegon Lumberjacks alumni who played more than 100 games in Muskegon and 100 or more games in the National Hockey League.

- Jock Callander
- Jeff Daniels
- Gord Dineen
- Dan Frawley
- Paul Laus
- Jim Paek
- Dennis Polonich
- Richard Zemlak
