= 1990–91 IHL season =

North American ice hockey season

The 1990–91 IHL season was the 46th season of the International Hockey League, a North American minor professional league. The season started with 11 team, falling to 10 when Albany Choppers folded in February 1991. The Peoria Rivermen won the Turner Cup.

== Regular season ==
East Division	GP	W	L	T	OTL	GF	GA	Pts
Kalamazoo Wings	82	52	29	0	1	354	302	105
Indianapolis Ice	82	48	29	0	5	342	264	101
Fort Wayne Komets	83	43	35	0	5	369	335	91
Muskegon Lumberjacks	83	38	40	0	5	305	352	81
Albany Choppers	55	22	30	0	3	191	232	47

West Division	GP	W	L	T	OTL	GF	GA	Pts
Peoria Rivermen	82	58	19	0	5	405	261	121
Salt Lake Golden Eagles	83	50	28	0	5	353	296	105
Phoenix Roadrunners	83	38	36	0	9	326	343	85
Milwaukee Admirals	82	36	43	0	3	275	316	75
San Diego Gulls	83	30	45	0	8	273	362	68
Kansas City Blades	82	25	53	0	4	255	385	65

== Turner Cup-Playoffs ==
Turner Cup-Quarterfinals
W1	Peoria Rivermen	4
W4	Milwaukee Admirals	2
W2	Salt Lake Golden Eagles	0
W3	Phoenix Roadrunners	4
E1	Kalamazoo Wings	4
E4	Muskegon Lumberjacks	1
E2	Indianapolis Ice	3
E3	Fort Wayne Komets	4

Turner Cup-Semifinals
W1	Peoria Rivermen	4
W3	Phoenix Roadrunners	3
E1	Kalamazoo Wings	2
E3	Fort Wayne Komets	4

Turner Cup-Final
W1	Peoria Rivermen	4
E3	Fort Wayne Komets	2
