= 1991–92 IHL season =

North American ice hockey season

The 1991–92 IHL season was the 47th season of the International Hockey League, a North American minor professional league. 10 teams participated in the regular season, and the Kansas City Blades won the Turner Cup.

== Regular season ==
East Division	GP	W	L	T	OTL	GF	GA	Pts
Fort Wayne Komets	82	52	22	0	8	340	287	112
Muskegon Lumberjacks	82	41	28	0	13	306	293	95
Kalamazoo Wings	82	37	35	0	10	292	312	84
Milwaukee Admirals	82	38	36	0	8	306	309	84
Indianapolis Ice	82	31	41	0	10	272	329	72

West Division	GP	W	L	T	OTL	GF	GA	Pts
Kansas City Blades	82	56	22	0	4	302	248	116
Peoria Rivermen	82	48	25	0	9	333	300	105
San Diego Gulls	82	45	28	0	9	340	298	99
Salt Lake Golden Eagles	82	33	40	0	9	252	304	75
Phoenix Roadrunners	82	29	46	0	7	275	338	65

== Turner Cup-Playoffs ==
Turner Cup-Quarterfinals
W1	Kansas City Blades	4
W4	Salt Lake Golden Eagles	1
W2	Peoria Rivermen	4
W3	San Diego Gulls	0
E2	Muskegon Lumberjacks	4
E4	Milwaukee Admirals	1
E1	Fort Wayne Komets	3
E3	Kalamazoo Wings	4

Turner Cup-Semifinals
W1	Kansas City Blades	4
W2	Peoria Rivermen	2
E2	Muskegon Lumberjacks	4
E3	Kalamazoo Wings	1

Turner Cup-Final
W1	Kansas City Blades	4
E2	Muskegon Lumberjacks	0
