= Northeastern Huskies men's ice hockey statistical leaders =

The Northeastern Huskies men's ice hockey statistical leaders are individual statistical leaders of the Northeastern Huskies men's ice hockey program in various categories, including goals, assists, points, and saves. Within those areas, the lists identify single-game, single-season, and career leaders. The Huskies represent Northeastern University in the NCAA's Hockey East.

Northeastern began competing in intercollegiate ice hockey in 1929. These lists are updated through the end of the 2020–21 season.

== Goals ==
Career
Rk	Player	Goals	Seasons
1	Art Chisholm	100	1958–59 1959–60 1960–61
2	Charlie Huck	93	1972–73 1973–74 1974–75 1975–76
	Jim Martel	93	1972–73 1973–74 1974–75 1975–76
4	David Poile	82	1967–68 1968–69 1969–70
5	Rod Isbister	79	1982–83 1983–84 1984–85 1985–86
6	Ken Manchurek	76	1980–81 1981–82 1982–83 1983–84
7	Brian Sullivan	74	1987–88 1988–89 1989–90 1990–91
8	Jean-Francois Aube	72	1991–92 1992–93 1993–94 1994–95
	Rich Cavanaugh	72	1953–54 1954–55 1955–56 1956–57
	Dave Sherlock	72	1972–73 1973–74 1974–75 1975–76

Season
Rk	Player	Goals	Season
1	Art Chisholm	40	1958–59
2	David Poile	37	1969–70
3	Art Chisholm	35	1960–61
4	Leo Dupere	33	1962–63
5	Jim Martel	32	1974–75
	Jim Leu	32	1965–66
7	Zach Aston-Reese	31	2016–17
8	David Poile	31	1968–69
9	Adam Gaudette	30	2017–18
	Jay Heinbuck	30	1985–86
	Rich Cavanaugh	30	1955–56

Single Game
Rk	Player	Goals	Season	Opponent
1	Jim Reid	6	1947–48	Norwich
2	John Byrne	5	1937–38	Middlebury
	John Byrne	5	1937–38	BC
	George Lambert	5	1958–59	Bowdoin

== Assists ==
Career
Rk	Player	Assists	Seasons
1	Mike Holmes	127	1974–75 1975–76 1976–77 1977–78
2	Jim Martel	117	1972–73 1973–74 1974–75 1975–76
3	Rod Isbister	110	1982–83 1983–84 1984–85 1985–86
4	Jordon Shields	104	1992–93 1993–94 1994–95 1995–96
5	Harry Mews	101	1986–87 1987–88 1988–89 1989–90
6	Dave Sherlock	100	1972–73 1973–74 1974–75 1975–76
	Mike Taylor	100	1990–91 1991–92 1992–93 1993–94
8	Jim Averill	99	1981–82 1982–83 1983–84 1984–85
	Charlie Huck	99	1972–73 1973–74 1974–75 1975–76
10	Jason Guerriero	98	2001–02 2002–03 2003–04 2004–05

Season
Rk	Player	Assists	Season
1	Jay Heinbuck	40	1985–86
2	Jim Martel	39	1975–76
	Harry Mews	39	1989–90
4	Scott Gruhl	38	1977–78
5	Charlie Huck	37	1974–75
6	Dylan Sikura	36	2016–17
7	Mike Holmes	35	1977–78
	Dave Sherlock	35	1975–76
	Mike Taylor	35	1993–94
10	Rob Cowie	34	1988–89
	Leo Dupere	34	1962–63

Single Game
Rk	Player	Assists	Season	Opponent
1	Wayne Turner	6	1976–77	Massachusetts

== Points ==
Career
Rk	Player	Points	Seasons
1	Jim Martel	210	1972–73 1973–74 1974–75 1975–76
2	Charlie Huck	192	1972–73 1973–74 1974–75 1975–76
3	Rod Isbister	189	1982–83 1983–84 1984–85 1985–86
4	Art Chisholm	182	1958–59 1959–60 1960–61
5	Dave Sherlock	172	1972–73 1973–74 1974–75 1975–76
6	Jordon Shields	166	1992–93 1993–94 1994–95 1995–96
7	Harry Mews	165	1986–87 1987–88 1988–89 1989–90
8	Ken Manchurek	162	1980–81 1981–82 1982–83 1983–84
9	Kevin Heffernan	154	1984–85 1985–86 1986–87 1987–88
10	Mike Holmes	152	1974–75 1975–76 1976–77 1977–78

Season
Rk	Player	Points	Season
1	Jay Heinbuck	70	1985–86
2	Leo Dupere	67	1962–63
3	Jim Martel	66	1975–76
4	Art Chisholm	65	1958–59
5	Charlie Huck	64	1974–75
6	Zach Aston-Reese	63	2016–17
	Jim Martel	63	1974–75
8	Art Chisholm	61	1960–61
	Dave Sherlock	61	1975–76
10	Adam Gaudette	60	2017–18

Single Game
Rk	Player	Points	Season	Opponent
1	Leo Dupere	9	1961–62	Norwich
2	Leo Dupere	7	1962–63	Norwich
	Gerry Cowie	7	1980–81	Merrimack

== Saves ==
Career
Rk	Player	Saves	Seasons
1	Bruce Racine	3557	1984–85 1985–86 1986–87 1987–88
2	Chris Rawlings	3522	2009–10 2010–11 2011–12 2012–13
3	Brad Thiessen	3166	2006–07 2007–08 2008–09
4	Keni Gibson	2311	2001–02 2002–03 2003–04 2004–05
5	Mike Veisor	2311	1992–93 1993–94 1994–95 1995–96
6	Marc Robitaille	2182	1996–97 1997–98
7	Gary Thornton	2169	1964–65 1965–66 1966–67
8	Tom Cole	2156	1988–89 1989–90 1990–91 1991–92
9	Todd Reynolds	2078	1991–92 1992–93 1993–94 1994–95 1995–96
10	Devon Levi	2018	2020–21 2021–22 2022–23

Season
Rk	Player	Saves	Season
1	Brad Thiessen	1195	2008–09
2	Marc Robitaille	1155	1997–98
3	Devon Levi	1066	2022–23
4	Clay Witt	1043	2013–14
5	Chris Rawlings	1040	2010–11
6	Marc Robitaille	1027	1996–97
7	Cayden Primeau	1026	2018–19
8	Keni Gibson	1016	2004–05
9	Bruce Racine	1015	1985–86
10	Brad Thiessen	1014	2007–08

Single Game
Rk	Player	Saves	Season	Opponent
1	Gus Capizzo	60	1962–63	Middlebury
	Devon Levi	60	2021–22	Connecticut
3	Cameron Whitehead	57	2024–25	Maine
4	Bill Lawn	54	1955–56	Harvard
	Devon Levi	54	2022–23	Providence
6	Clay Witt	52	2013–14	Providence
	George Demetroulakos	52	1979–80	Boston University
