= Northeastern Huskies men's ice hockey =

- Current season
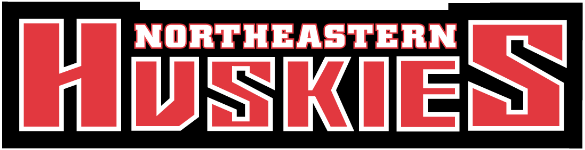
- University: Northeastern University
- Conference: Hockey East
- Head coach: Jerry Keefe; 6th season, 91–80–13 (.530)
- Assistant coaches: Mike Levine; Matt Harlow; Brian Mahoney-Wilson
- Captain(s): Joaquim Lemay, Andy Moore
- Alternate captain(s): Joe Connor, Jacob Mathieu, Eli Sebastian
- Arena: Matthews Arena; Boston, Massachusetts
- Student section: The DogHouse
- Colors: Red and black

NCAA tournament Frozen Four
- 1982

NCAA tournament appearances
- 1982, 1988, 1994, 2009, 2016, 2018, 2019, 2022

Conference tournament champions
- ECAC: 1982; Hockey East: 1988, 2016, 2019

Conference regular season champions
- Hockey East: 2022

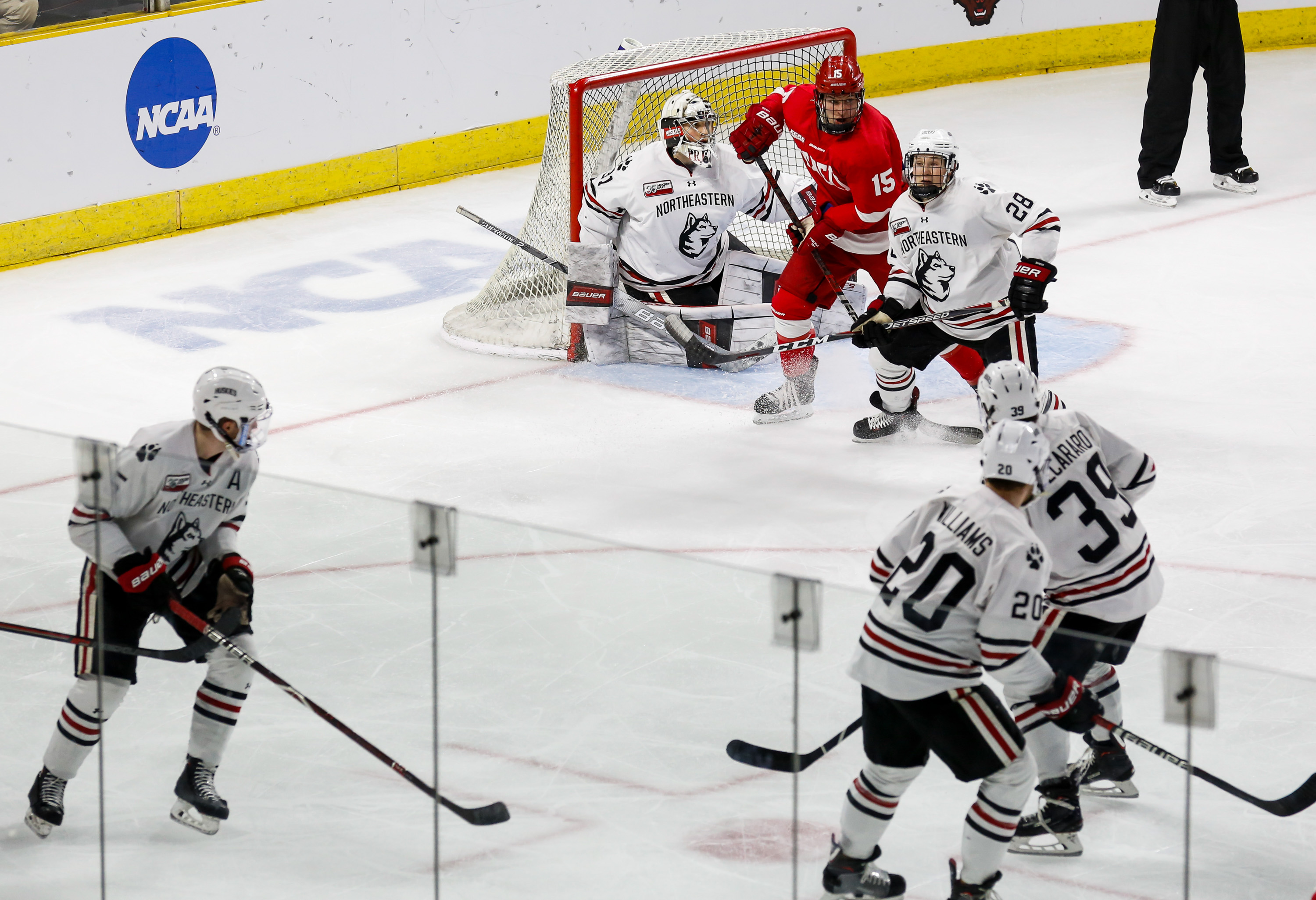
Huskies vs. Cornell, 2019 NCAA Hockey East regional

The Northeastern Huskies men's ice hockey team is an NCAA Division I college ice hockey program that represents Northeastern University in Boston, Massachusetts. The team has competed in Hockey East since 1984 and has won three tournament titles, having previously played in the Eastern College Athletic Conference (ECAC), where they won one tournament championship. The Huskies played home games at the 4,666-seat Matthews Arena until December 2025, the world's oldest hockey arena still in use at the time of its closure. Jerry Keefe assumed the head coach role in 2021 after longtime coach Jim Madigan moved to athletic director.

== History ==
The men's ice hockey program has existed since 1929 and played as an independent NCAA Division I team until joining the ECAC in 1961. Northeastern is a founding member of the Hockey East athletic conference, which the team joined in 1984. The Huskies had their most success in the 1980s, when the team won the prestigious Beanpot tournament four times (1980, 1984, 1985, 1988) and was the runner-up twice (1983 and 1987). The Huskies ended a 30-year Beanpot drought in 2018, followed by further wins in 2019, 2020, 2023, and 2024 for a total of nine championships.

Its best season came in 1982, when the Huskies finished 25–9–2 and made it to the NCAA Frozen Four. They also won the Hockey East championship in 1988, 2016, and 2019, and made appearances in the NCAA hockey tournament in 1988, 1994, 2009, 2016, 2018, and 2019.

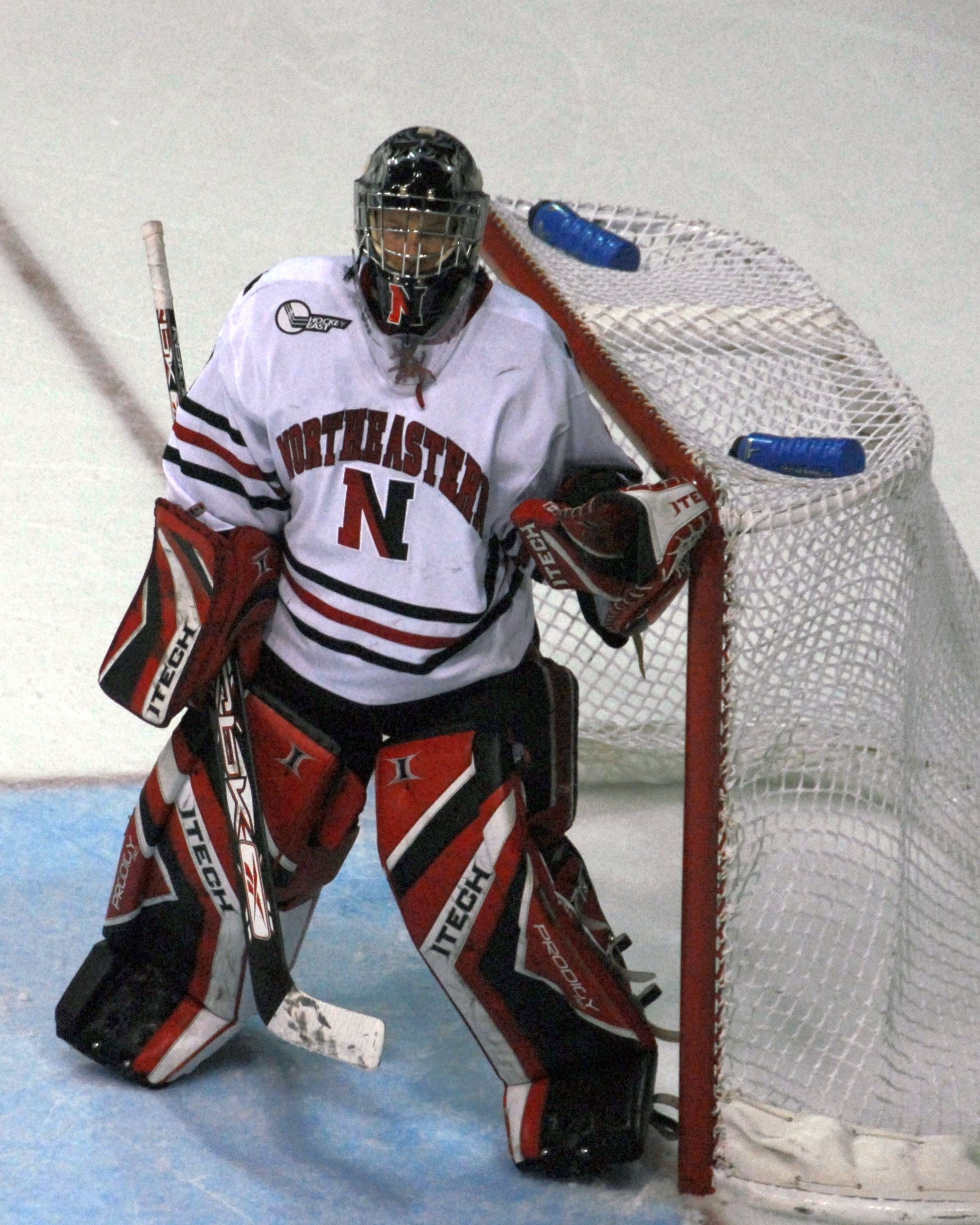
Brad Thiessen was named to the Hockey East All-Rookie team in 2007.

Northeastern players who have gone on to significant professional hockey careers have included David Poile '71, long time general manager of the NHL Washington Capitals and current general manager of the NHL Nashville Predators, St. Louis Blues goaltender and two-time All-American Bruce Racine '88, NHL defenseman Dan McGillis, Montreal Canadiens winger Chris Nilan, and Chicago Blackhawks defenseman and Hobey Baker Award finalist Jim Fahey '02.

Other than those who have achieved success in the professional ranks, some of the more notable individual players in team history include Adam Gaudette, the 2018 Hobey Baker Award winner as the most valuable player in NCAA collegiate hockey (the only such winner in the program's history); Art Chisholm and Ray Picard, each two-time All-Americans; and Sandy Beadle and Jason Guerriero, each a one-time All-American who was also a Hobey Baker Award finalist. Chisholm is the leading career goal scorer for the Huskies with 100, while Jim Martel is the career scoring leader with 210 points. The most notable goaltenders in team history are Racine, Keni Gibson and Cayden Primeau, who between them hold most school career records. Devon Levi broke Brad Thiessen's single-season record of shutouts in 2022 with 10, his first full year starting in goal.

== Season-by-season results ==
Source:

== Head coaches ==
As of the middle of the 2025–26 season

Tenure	Coach	Years	Record	Pct.
1929–1936	H. Nelson Raymond	7	26–28–5	.483
1936–1942, 1946–1955	Herb Gallagher	15	108–122–6	.470
1942–1943	William L. Linskey	1	7–6–0	.538
1955–1970	Jim Bell	15	154–218–4	.415
1970–1989	Fernie Flaman	19	256–301–24	.461
1989–1991	Don McKenney	2	24–44–4	.361
1991–1996	Ben Smith	5	71–91–18	.444
1996–2005	Bruce Crowder	9	120–170–36	.423
2005–2011	Greg Cronin	6	87–104–29	.461
2011–2021	Jim Madigan	10	174–139–39	.550
2021–present	Jerry Keefe	6	91–80–13	.530
Totals	11 coaches	94 seasons	1,112-1,297–178	.464

== Roster ==
As of October 11, 2026.

No.	Nat.	Player	Class	Pos	Height	Weight	DoB	Hometown	Previous team	NHL rights
2	(Canada)	Joaquim Lemay (C)	Graduate	D	6' 1" (1.85 m)	184 lb (83 kg)	2002-07-28	Saint-Pierre-les-Becquets, Quebec	Omaha (USHL)	WSH, 119th overall 2021
3	(Canada)	Amine Hajibi	Sophomore	F	6' 1" (1.85 m)	185 lb (84 kg)	2005-05-04	Montréal, Quebec	Cedar Rapids RoughRiders (USHL)	—
4	(Canada)	Alex Pineau	Junior	D	6' 3" (1.91 m)	200 lb (91 kg)	2003-01-21	Thunder Bay, Ontario	Brown (ECAC)	—
5	(Sweden)	Joel Kjellberg	Junior	D	6' 0" (1.83 m)	190 lb (86 kg)	2004-04-29	Nacka, Sweden	Arizona St. (NCHC)	—
6	(United States)	Grayson Badger	Sophomore	F	6' 2" (1.88 m)	187 lb (85 kg)	2004-05-09	Hyde Park, Massachusetts	Alberni Valley Bulldogs (BCHL)	—
7	(United States)	Andy Moore (C)	Senior	F	5' 11" (1.8 m)	195 lb (88 kg)	2002-01-21	Cumberland, Maine	Cedar Rapids RoughRiders (USHL)	—
8	(Canada)	Matthew Perkins	Senior	F	5' 11" (1.8 m)	156 lb (71 kg)	2004-01-21	Balgonie, Saskatchewan	Minnesota Duluth (NCHC)	VAN, 119th overall 2023
9	(Canada)	Tyler Fukakusa	Senior	F	5' 11" (1.8 m)	180 lb (82 kg)	2002-08-14	Toronto, Ontario	RIT (AHA)	—
10	(United States)	Trey Jefferis	Freshman	F	5' 10" (1.78 m)	190 lb (86 kg)	2005-007-29	West Chester, Pennsylvania	Sioux City Musketeers (USHL)	—
11	(Canada)	Eli Sebastian (A)	Senior	F	5' 11" (1.8 m)	190 lb (86 kg)	2004-05-19	Burlington, Ontario	Green Bay Gamblers (USHL)	—
13	(United States)	Charlie Pardue	Sophomore	F	5' 11" (1.8 m)	190 lb (86 kg)	2006-01-05	Winnetka, Illinois	Notre Dame (Big Ten)	—
14	(United States)	Joe Connor (A)	Junior	F	6' 1" (1.85 m)	200 lb (91 kg)	2005-03-31	Amherst, New Hampshire	Muskegon Lumberjacks (USHL)	TBL, 195th overall 2024
15	(Canada)	Marcus Kearsey	Freshman	D	5' 11" (1.8 m)	185 lb (84 kg)	2006-03-17	Deer Lake, Newfoundland	Charlottetown Islanders (QMJHL)	—
18	(United States)	Liam O'Keefe	Freshman	D	6' 0" (1.83 m)	190 lb (86 kg)	2006-01-31	Boston, Massachusetts	Lone Star Brahmas (NAHL)	—
19	(United States)	Marc Lund	Junior	F	6' 4" (1.93 m)	205 lb (93 kg)	2003-04-29	Edina, Minnesota	Fairbanks Ice Dogs (NAHL)	—
21	(United States)	Jack Pechar	Sophomore	F	6' 1" (1.85 m)	198 lb (90 kg)	2005-03-20	Niskayuna, New York	Lincoln Stars (USHL)	—
22	(Canada)	Giacomo Martino	Sophomore	F	5' 11" (1.8 m)	185 lb (84 kg)	2004-02-22	Toronto, Ontario	Sioux City Musketeers (USHL)	—
23	(Canada)	Dawson Sharkey	Freshman	F	6' 1" (1.85 m)	185 lb (84 kg)	2006-07-23	Souris, Prince Edward Island	Newfoundland Regiment (QMJHL)	DAL, 190th overall 2025
33	(United States)	Noah Jones	Sophomore	D	6' 5" (1.96 m)	212 lb (96 kg)	2004-02-22	Bridgewater, New Jersey	Omaha Lancers (USHL)	—
37	(United States)	Sam Caulfield	Freshman	G	6' 3" (1.91 m)	190 lb (86 kg)	2006-08-29	Needham, Massachusetts	Baie-Comeau Drakkar (QMJHL)	—
44	(United States)	Owen Keefe	Freshman	D	6' 1" (1.85 m)	195 lb (88 kg)	2006-03-26	Saugus, Massachusetts	Drummondville Voltigeurs (QMJHL)	—
47	(United States)	Lawton Zacher	Senior	G	6' 2" (1.88 m)	180 lb (82 kg)	2003-12-31	Buffalo, New York	Brown (ECAC)	—
49	(Canada)	Jordan Tourigny	Freshman	D	6' 0" (1.83 m)	195 lb (88 kg)	2005-02-28	Victoriaville, Quebec	Chicoutimi Saguenéens (QMJHL)	—
70	(United States)	Matt DellaRusso	Sophomore	G	6' 3" (1.91 m)	187 lb (85 kg)	2004-10-28	Darien, Connecticut	Maine Nordiques (NAHL)	—
81	(Canada)	Jacob Mathieu (A)	Sophomore	F	5' 11" (1.8 m)	192 lb (87 kg)	2004-05-05	Saint-Odilon-de-Cranbourne, Quebec	Rimouski Océanic (QMJHL)	—
88	(Canada)	Miguel Marques	Sophomore	F	5' 11" (1.8 m)	190 lb (86 kg)	2006-03-08	Prince George, British Columbia	Maine (HEA)	NSH, 87th overall 2024
91	(Canada)	Noah Laberge	Freshman	D	6' 1" (1.85 m)	195 lb (88 kg)	2006-10-09	Saint-Bruno-De-Montarville, Quebec	Newfoundland Regiment (QMJHL)	BUF, 135th overall 2025
92	(Canada)	Matthew Maltais	Sophomore	F	6' 2" (1.88 m)	183 lb (83 kg)	2004-09-02	Saint-Basile-le-Grand, Quebec	Lincoln Stars (USHL)	—

== Statistical leaders ==
=== Career points leaders ===
Player	Years	GP	G	A	Pts	PIM
Jim Martel	1972–1976	110	93	117	210	
Charlie Huck	1972–1976	110	93	99	192	
Rod Isbister	1982–1986	127	79	110	189	
Art Chisholm	1958–1961	72	100	82	182	
Dave Sherlock	1972–1976	89	72	100	172	
Jordan Shields	1992–1996	142	62	104	168	
Harry Mews	1986–1990	133	64	101	165	
Ken Manchurek	1980–1984	111	76	86	162	
Kevin Heffernan	1984–1988	143	58	96	154	
Mike Holmes	1974–1978	108	25	127	152	

Rico Rossi is the Huskies' career penalty minute leader with 406; Eric Williams is the career games leader with 155.

=== Career goaltending leaders ===
GP = Games played; Min = Minutes played; W = Wins; L = Losses; T = Ties; GA = Goals against; SO = Shutouts; SV% = Save percentage; GAA = Goals against average

minimum 30 games played

Player	Years	GP	Min	W	L	T	GA	SO	SV%	GAA
Devon Levi	2021–2023	66	3940	38	22	6	125	16	.942	1.90
Cayden Primeau	2017–2019	70	4134	44	18	6	138	8	.932	2.00
Brad Thiessen	2006–2009	111	6661	52	46	12	266	9	.922	2.40
Ryan Ruck	2015–2019	86	4921	44	28	8	213	4	.904	2.60
Clay Witt	2010–2015	71	3930	31	27	5	172	5	.920	2.63
Cameron Whitehead	2024–2025	70	4163	30	31	6	186	5	.914	2.68

Bruce Racine and Chris Rawlings are tied for the career games record with 123.

Statistics current through the end of the 2022–23 season.

== Awards and honors ==
=== Hockey Hall of Fame ===
- Fernie Flaman (1990)

=== United States Hockey Hall of Fame ===
- David Poile (2018)
- Sid Watson (1999)

=== NCAA ===
==== Individual awards ====
Hobey Baker Award

- Adam Gaudette: 2018

Spencer Penrose Award

- Fernie Flaman: 1982

Mike Richter Award

- Cayden Primeau: 2019
- Devon Levi: 2022, 2023

NCAA Scoring Champion

- Zach Aston-Reese: 2017
- Adam Gaudette: 2018

==== All-American teams ====
AHCA First Team All-Americans

- 1951–52: Ray Picard, G
- 1952–53: Ray Picard, G
- 1959–60: Art Chisholm, F
- 1960–61: Art Chisholm, F
- 1980–81: Sandy Beadle, F
- 1986–87: Bruce Racine, G
- 1987–88: Bruce Racine, G
- 1989–90: Rob Cowie, D
- 1995–96: Dan McGillis, F
- 1997–98: Marc Robitaille, G
- 2001–02: Jim Fahey, D
- 2004–05: Jason Guerriero, F
- 2008–09: Brad Thiessen, G
- 2016–17: Zach Aston-Reese, F
- 2017–18: Jérémy Davies, D; Adam Gaudette, F; Dylan Sikura, F
- 2018–19: Cayden Primeau, G
- 2021–22: Devon Levi, G; Aidan McDonough, F
- 2022–23: Devon Levi, G; Aidan McDonough, F

AHCA Second Team All-Americans

- 1947–48: Jim Bell, F
- 1983–84: Ken Manchurek, F
- 1984–85: Jim Averill, F
- 1987–88: Brian Dowd, D
- 2014–15: Kevin Roy, F
- 2018–19: Jérémy Davies, F
- 2019–20: Tyler Madden, F
- 2021–22: Jordan Harris, D

=== ECAC Hockey ===
==== Individual awards ====
Most Outstanding Player in Tournament

- Mark Davidner: 1982

==== All-Conference teams ====
First Team All-ECAC Hockey

- 1962–63: Leo Dupere, F
- 1963–64: Leo Dupere, F
- 1980–81: Sandy Beadle, F

Second Team All-ECAC Hockey

- 1963–64: Larry Bone, F
- 1964–65: Don Turcotte, D
- 1966–67: Don Turcotte, D
- 1967–68: Ken Leu, G
- 1969–70: David Poile, F

=== Hockey East ===
==== Individual awards ====
Player of the Year

- Brad Thiessen: 2009
- Zach Aston-Reese: 2017
- Adam Gaudette: 2018
- Devon Levi: 2023

Rookie of the Year

- Devon Levi: 2022

Best Defensive Forward

- Joe Vitale: 2009
- Justin Hryckowian: 2023, 2024

Len Ceglarski Award

- Mike Jozefowicz: 2001
- Jason Guerriero: 2005

Goaltending Champions

- Brad Thiessen: 2009
- Cayden Primeau: 2018, 2019
- Devon Levi: 2022

Best Defensive Defenseman

- Tim Judy: 2005
- Louis Liotti: 2009
- Josh Manson: 2014
- Jordan Harris: 2022
- Hunter McDonald: 2023

Three-Stars Award

- Keni Gibson: 2004
- Brad Thiessen: 2009
- Clay Witt: 2014
- Adam Gaudette: 2018
- Cayden Primeau: 2019
- Aidan McDonough: 2021
- Devon Levi: 2022

Coach of the Year

- Fernie Flaman: 1989
- Bruce Crowder: 1998
- Greg Cronin: 2009
- Jerry Keefe: 2022

Tournament Most Valuable Player

- Bruce Racine: 1988
- Cayden Primeau: 2019

==== All-Conference teams ====
First Team

- 1984–85: Jim Averill, D; Rod Isbister, F
- 1985–86: Claude Lodin, D; Jay Heinbuck, F
- 1986–87: Bruce Racine, G
- 1987–88: Brian Dowd, D; David O'Brien, F
- 1988–89: Dave Buda, F
- 1989–90: Rob Cowie, D
- 1993–94: François Bouchard, D; Mike Taylor, F
- 1994–95: Dan McGillis, D; Jordan Shields, F
- 1995–96: Dan McGillis, D
- 1997–98: Marc Robitaille, G
- 2001–02: Jim Fahey, D
- 2004–05: Keni Gibson, G; Jason Guerriero, F
- 2008–09: Brad Thiessen, G
- 2014–15: Kevin Roy, F
- 2016–17: Zach Aston-Reese, F
- 2017–18: Cayden Primeau, G; Jérémy Davies, D; Adam Gaudette, F; Dylan Sikura, F
- 2018–19: Cayden Primeau, G; Jérémy Davies, D
- 2019–20: Tyler Madden, F
- 2021–22: Devon Levi, G; Jordan Harris, D; Aidan McDonough, F
- 2022–23: Devon Levi, G; Aidan McDonough, F
- 2025–26: Dylan Hryckowian, F

Second Team

- 1984–85: Bruce Racine, G
- 1985–86: Paul Fitzsimmons, D
- 1987–88: Claude Lodin, D
- 1988–89: Rob Cowie, D; Harry Mews, F
- 1989–90: Harry Mews, F
- 1990–91: Rob Cowie, D
- 2000–01: Jim Fahey, D
- 2004–05: Mike Morris, F
- 2007–08: Joe Vitale, F
- 2008–09: Ryan Ginand, F
- 2010–11: Wade MacLeod, F
- 2013–14: Clay Witt, G; Josh Manson, D; Kevin Roy, F
- 2015–16: Zach Aston-Reese, F
- 2016–17: Dylan Sikura, F
- 2017–18: Nolan Stevens, F
- 2019–20: Ryan Shea, D
- 2020–21: Zach Solow, F; Jordan Harris, D
- 2022–23: Justin Hryckowian, F
- 2025–26: Lawton Zacher, G; Vinny Borgesi, D

Third Team All-Hockey East

- 2016–17: Adam Gaudette, F
- 2023–24: Alex Campbell, F; Justin Hryckowian, F
- 2024–25: Cameron Lund, F

Rookie Team

- 1984–85: Bruce Racine, G
- 1987–88: Will Averill, D
- 1990–91: Mike Taylor, F
- 1991–92: Todd Reynolds, G
- 1992–93: Mike Veisor, G; Dan McGillis, D
- 1997–98: Brian Cummings, F
- 1998–99: Jim Fahey, D; Willie Levesque, F
- 2001–02: Keni Gibson, G
- 2002–03: Mike Morris, F
- 2006–07: Brad Thiessen, G; Chad Costello, F
- 2008–09: Steve Quailer, F
- 2009–10: Chris Rawlings, G; Jake Newton, D
- 2010–11: Anthony Bitetto, D; Brodie Reid, F
- 2011–12: Ludwig Karlsson, F
- 2012–13: Kevin Roy, F
- 2013–14: Mike Szmatula, F
- 2017–18: Cayden Primeau, G
- 2018–19: Tyler Madden, F
- 2020–21: Gunnarwolfe Fontaine, F
- 2021–22: Devon Levi, G; Justin Hryckowian, F; Jack Hughes, F
- 2022–23: Cameron Lund, F; Hunter McDonald, D
- 2025-26: Giacomo Martino, F; Jacob Mathieu, F

== Northeastern Huskies Hall of Fame ==
The following is a list of people associated with the Northeastern men's ice hockey program who were elected into the Northeastern Huskies Hall of Fame (induction date in parentheses).

- David Archambault (2016)
- Jim Averill (2002)
- Eddie Barry (1976)
- Robert F. Barry (1985)
- Jim Bell (1974)
- John Bialek (1980)
- Larry Bone (1993)
- Randy Bucyk (2011)
- John R. Byrne (1979)
- William Lee Carter (1979)
- Richard Cavanaugh (1978)
- Art Chisholm (1977)
- Dave Coleman (1981)
- John Connelly (1975)
- Rob Cowie (2005)
- Leo Dupere (1984)
- Jim Fahey (2012)
- Paul Filipe (2004)
- Fernie Flaman (1989)
- Jay Heinbuck (2010)
- Mike Holmes (1991)
- Charles Huck (2000)
- Rod Isbister (2003)
- Ken Manchurek (2006)
- Jim Martel (1990)
- Ed McCarty (1988)
- Paul McDougall (1996)
- Dan McGillis (2009)
- Don McKenney (1999)
- Neil McPhee (1980)
- Harry Mews (2009)
- David O'Brien (1995)
- Ray Picard (1977)
- David Poile (1987)
- Eric Porter (1982)
- Bruce Racine (2001)
- Bill Seabury (1986)
- Jordan Shields (2013)
- Don Turcotte (1983)
- Wayne Turner (1994)
- Jim Walsh (1991)
- Sid Watson (1975)
- Dean Webb (1981)
- Andrew Zamparelli (1983)

== Olympians ==
This is a list of Northeastern alumni were a part of an Olympic team.

Name	Position	Northeastern Tenure	Team	Year	Finish
Devon Levi	Goaltender	2020–2023	(Canada) CAN	2022	6th

== Huskies in the NHL ==
As of October 21, 2026.

Player	Position	Team(s)	Years	Games	Stanley Cups
Zach Aston-Reese	Center	PIT, ANA, TOR, DET, CBJ	2017–Present	416	0
Eddie Barry	Left Wing	BOS	1946–1947	19	0
Sandy Beadle	Left Wing	WPG	1980–1981	6	0
Matt Benning	Defenseman	EDM, NSH, SJS, TOR	2016–2026	465	0
Anthony Bitetto	Defenseman	NSH, MIN, WPG, NYR	2014–2021	197	0
Randy Bucyk	Right Wing	MTL, CGY	1985–1988	19	0
Art Chisholm	Center	BOS	1960–1961	3	0
Sam Colangelo	Right Wing	ANA	2023–Present	49	0
Rob Cowie	Defenseman	LAK	1994–1996	78	0
Jérémy Davies	Defenseman	NSH, BUF	2021–2023	23	0
Jim Fahey	Defenseman	SJS, NJD	2002–2007	92	0
Adam Gaudette	Center	VAN, CHI, OTT, STL, SJS	2017–Present	367	0
Scott Gruhl	Left Wing	LAK, PIT	1981–1988	20	0
Jordan Harris	Defenseman	MTL, CBJ, BOS	2021–Present	172	0
Justin Hryckowian	Center	DAL	2024–Present	95	0
Michael Kesselring	Defenseman	ARI, UTA, BUF, SJS	2022–Present	200	0
Devon Levi	Goaltender	BUF, EDM	2022–Present	45	0
Cameron Lund	Center	SJS	2024–Present	11	0

Player	Position	Team(s)	Years	Games	Stanley Cups
Josh Manson	Defenseman	ANA, COL	2014–Present	715	1
Hunter McDonald	Defense	PHI	2025–present	2	0
Aidan McDonough	Forward	VAN	2022–2023	6	0
Dan McGillis	Defenseman	EDM, PHI, SJS, BOS, NJD	1996–2006	634	0
Chris Nilan	Forward	MTL, NYR, BOS	1979–1992	688	1
Jamie Oleksiak	Defenseman	DAL, PIT, SEA, VAN	2012–Present	768	0
Cayden Primeau	Goaltender	MTL, TOR, CAR	2019–Present	58	0
Bruce Racine	Goaltender	STL	1995–1996	11	0
Kevin Roy	Left Wing	ANA	2017–2019	28	0
Michael Ryan	Left Wing	BUF, CAR	2006–2009	83	0
Ryan Shea	Defenseman	PIT, EDM	2023–Present	159	0
Dylan Sikura	Right Wing	CHI, VEG, COL	2017–2022	58	0
Jayden Struble	Defenseman	MTL, NSH	2023–Present	178	0
Brian Sullivan	Right Wing	NJD	1992–1993	2	0
Brad Thiessen	Goaltender	PIT	2011–2012	5	0
Joe Vitale	Center	PIT, ARI	2010–2016	234	0
Jim Walsh	Defenseman	BUF	1981–1982	4	0
Jack Williams	Center	CBJ	2024–Present	1	0

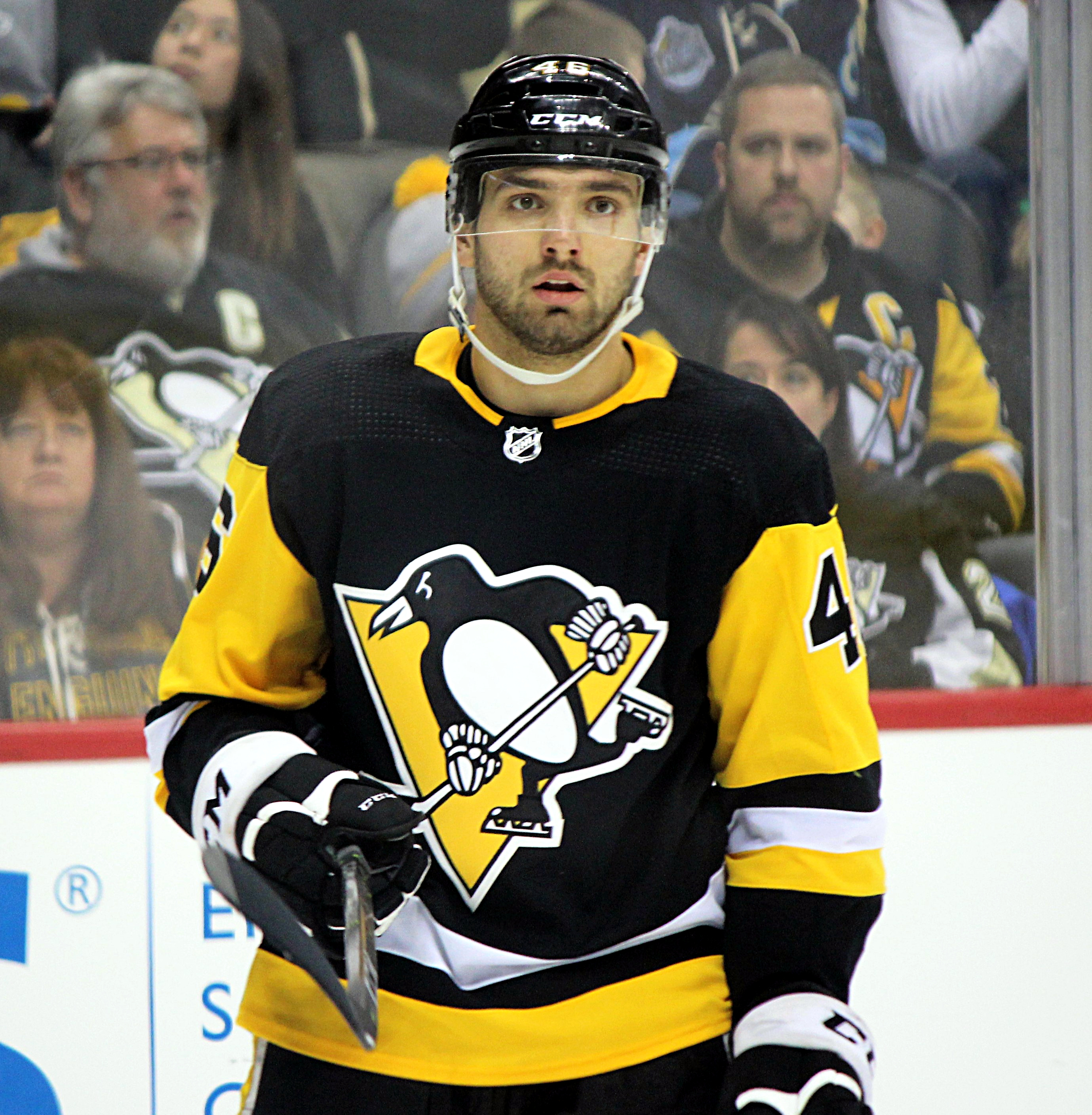
Zach Aston-Reese

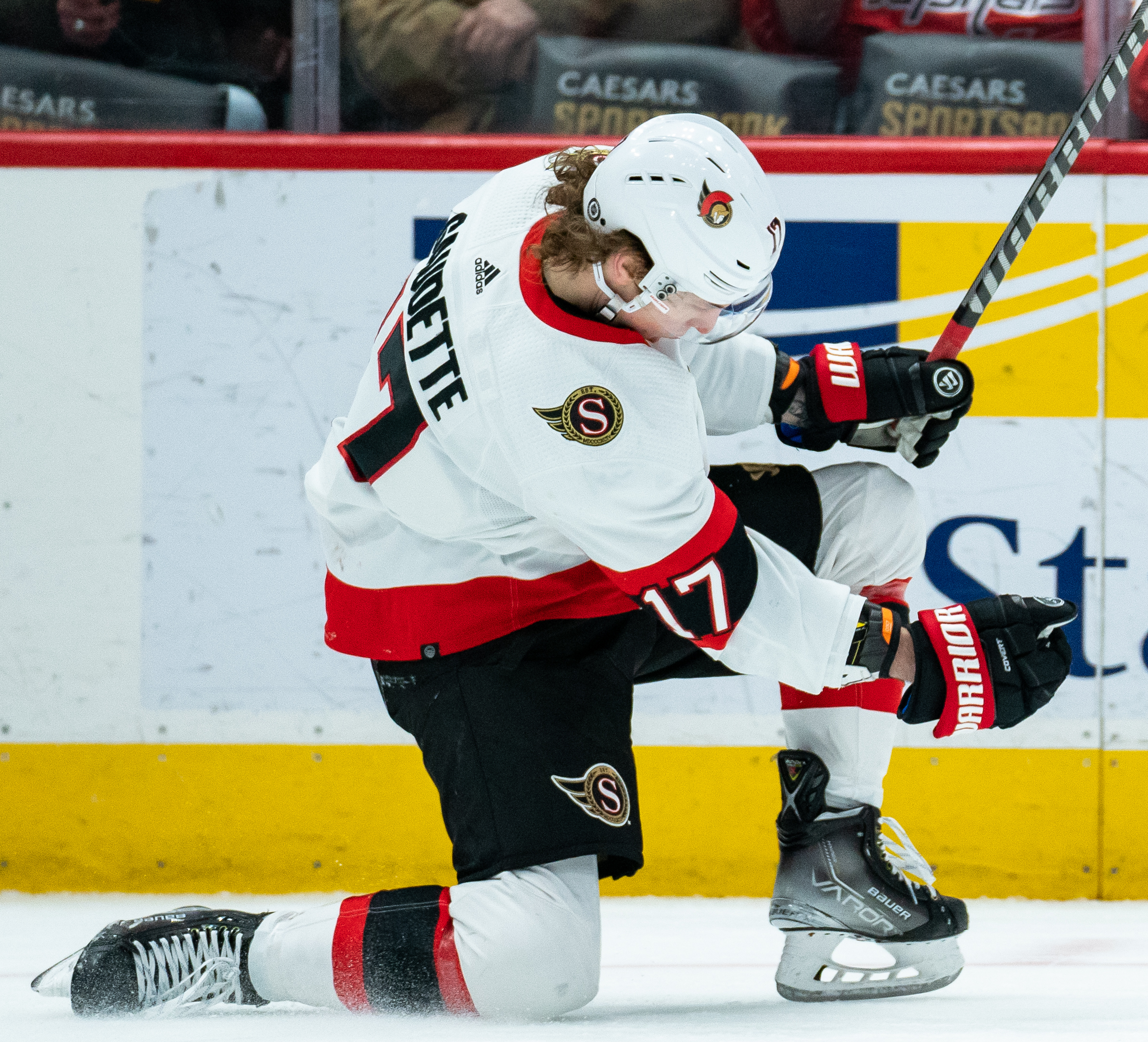
Adam Gaudette

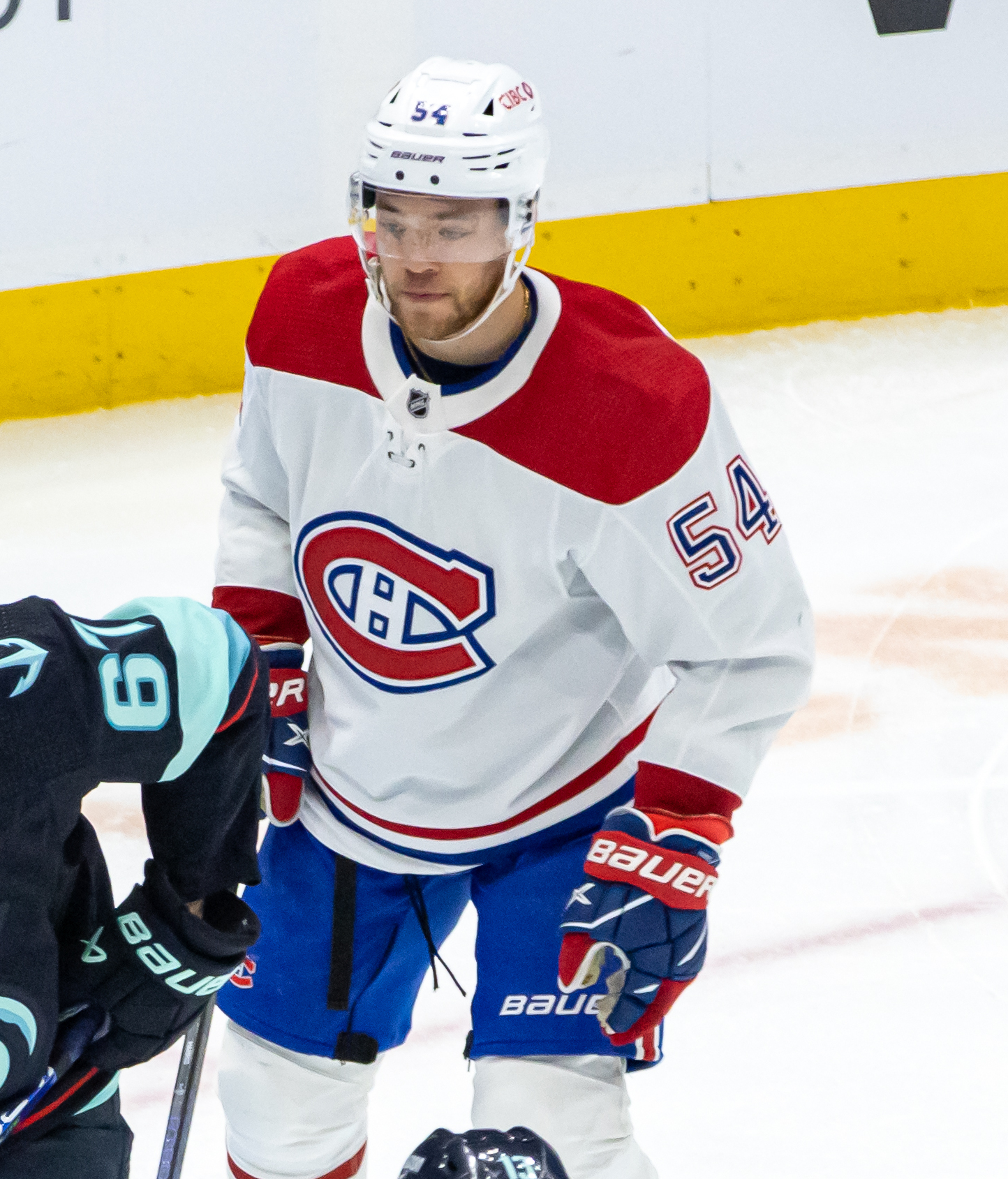
Jordan Harris

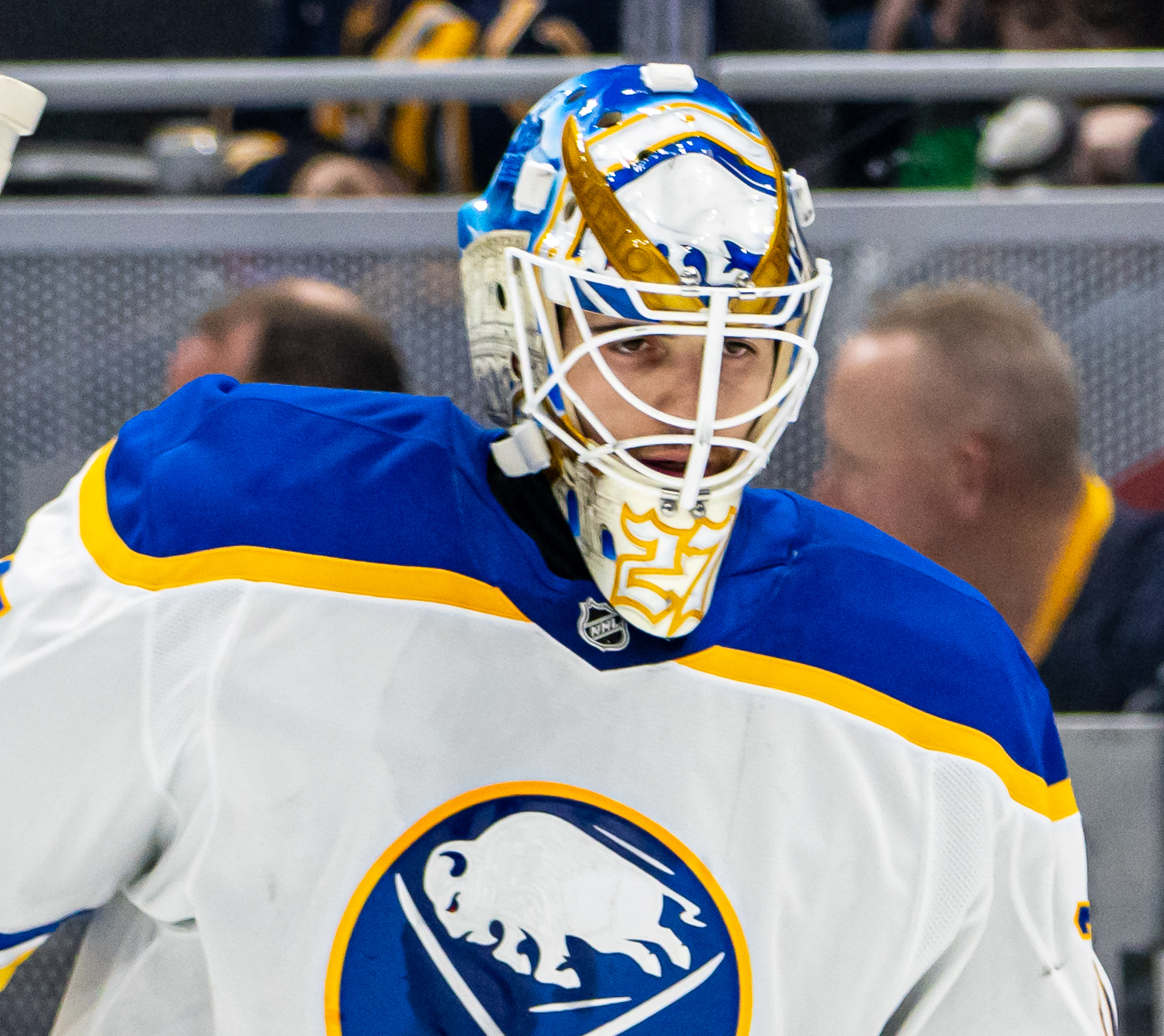
Devon Levi

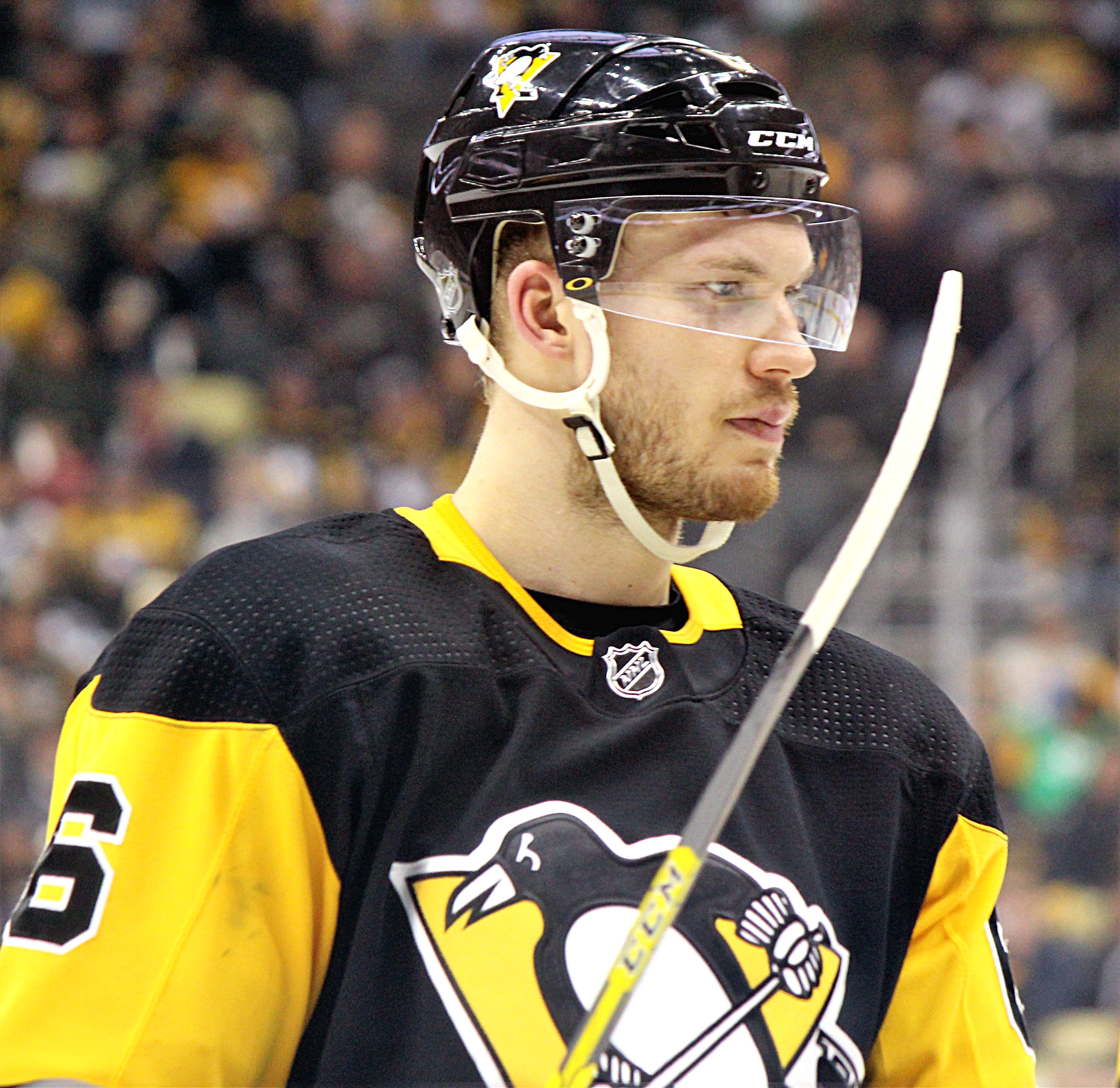
Jamie Oleksiak

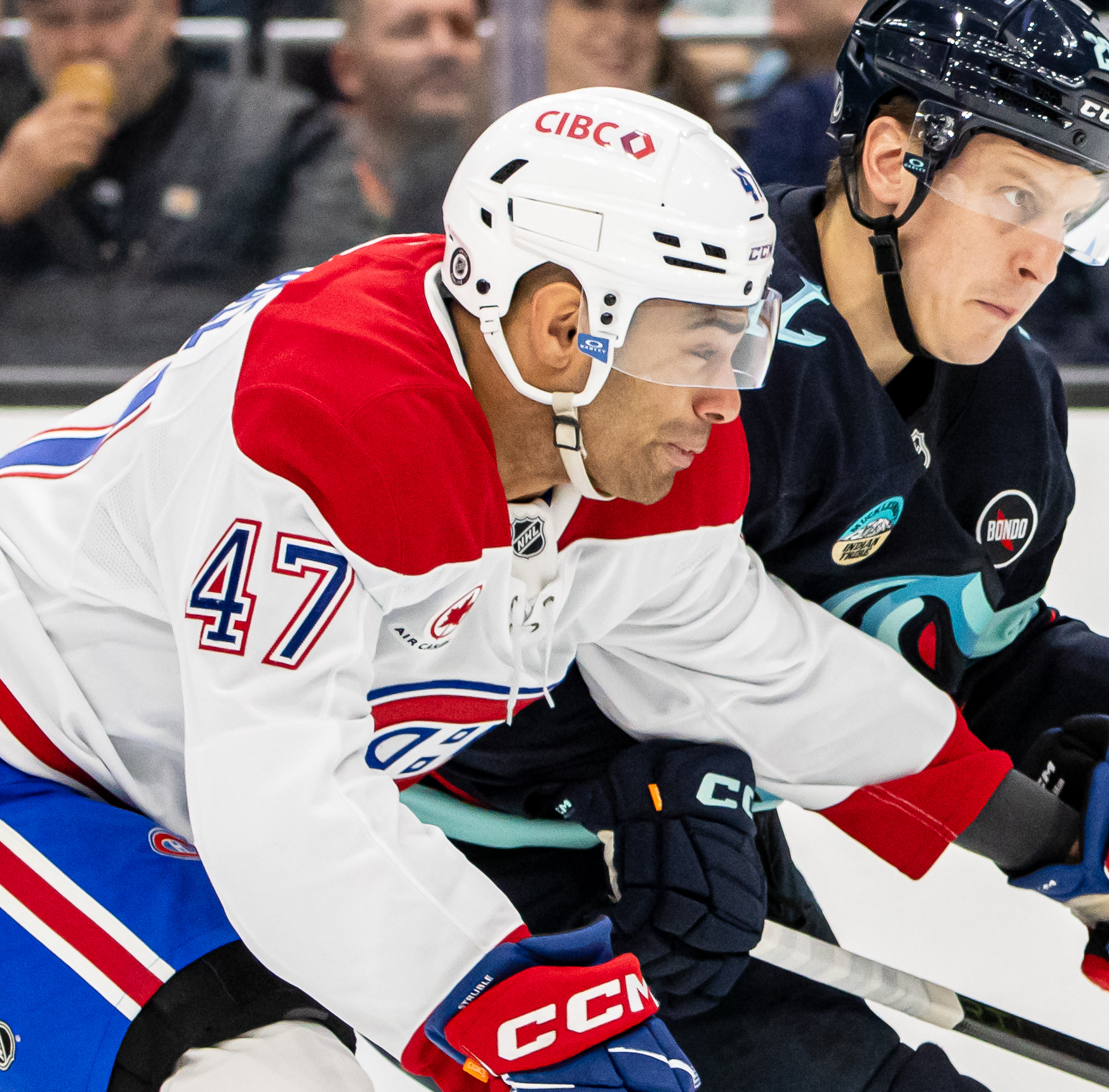
Jayden Struble

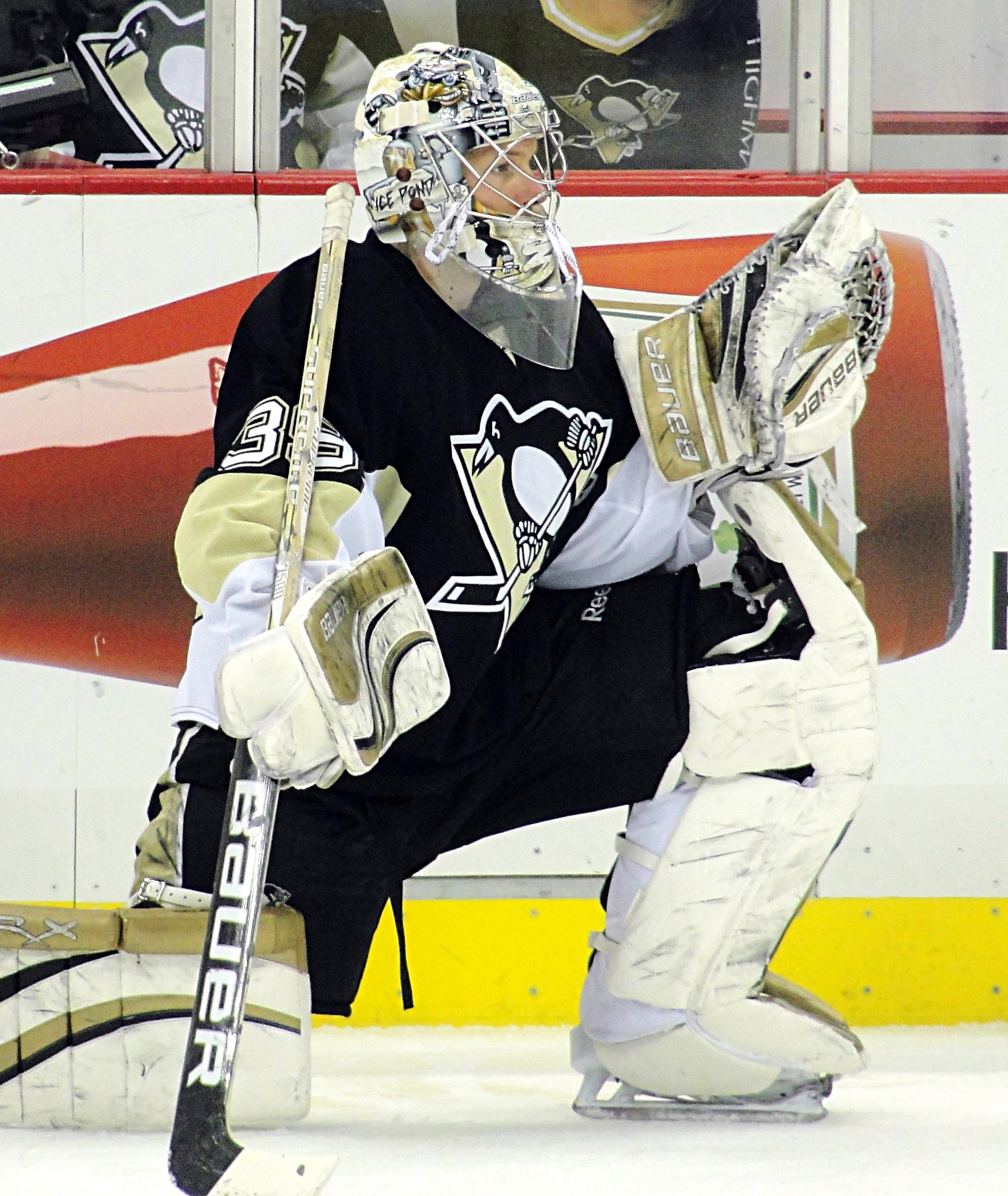
Brad Thiessen

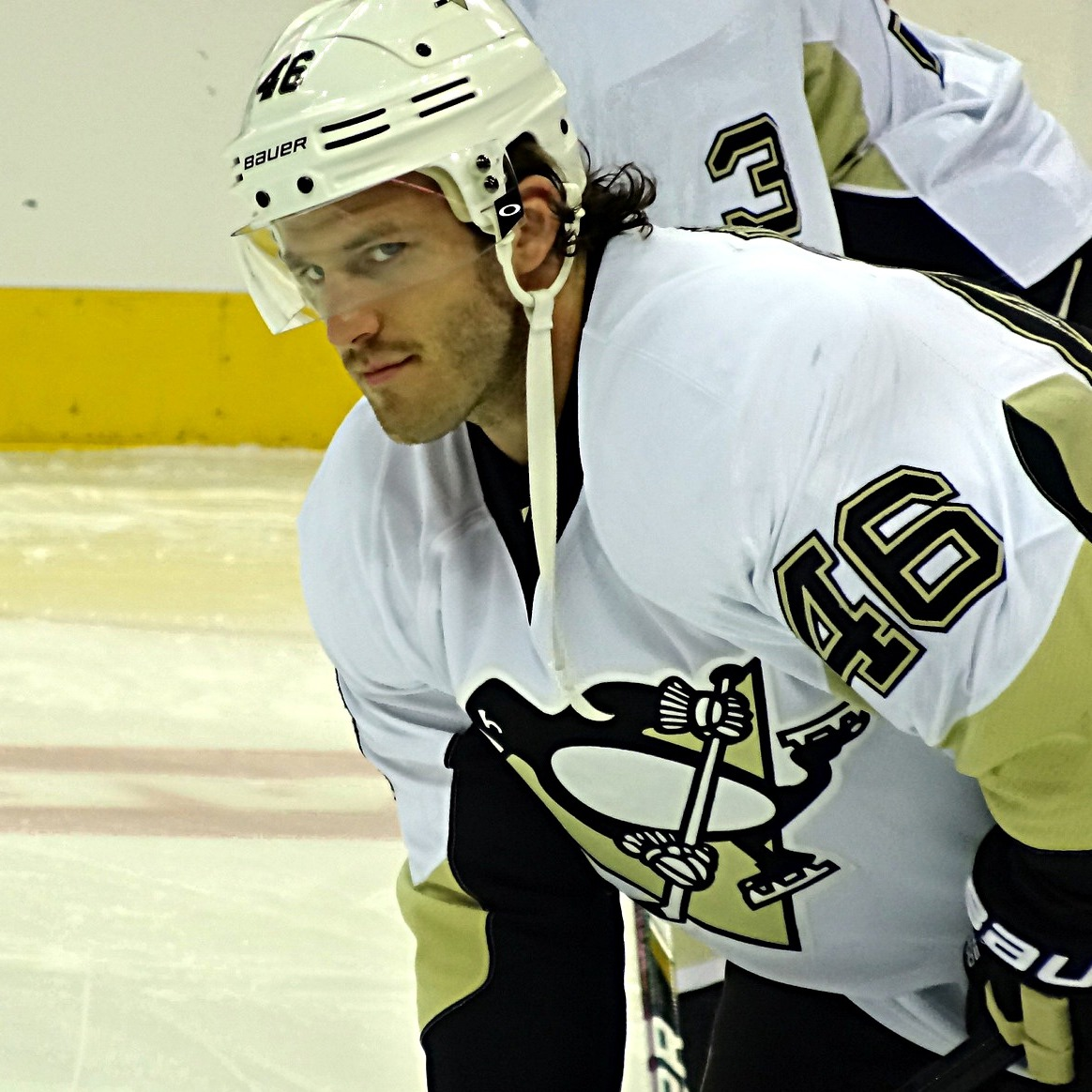
Joe Vitale

== See also ==
- Northeastern Huskies women's ice hockey
