= David Coleman (disambiguation) =

David Coleman (1926–2013) was a British sports commentator.

David Coleman may also refer to:

- David Coleman (architect) (fl. 2011), American architect
- David Coleman (Australian politician) (born 1974), federal Liberal Party politician
- David Coleman (demographer) (born 1946), British professor of demography at Oxford University
- David Coleman (businessman) (born 1969), College Board president and architect of the Common Core State Standards Initiative
- David Coleman (footballer, born 1942) (1942–2016), association footballer for Colchester United
- David Coleman (footballer, born 1967) (1967–1997), association footballer for Bournemouth and Colchester United
- David Coleman (New Zealand politician) (1881–1951), politician of the Labour Party
- David Firth (actor) (David Firth Coleman, born 1945), British actor
- David Robert Coleman (born 1969), conductor and composer
- Dave Coleman (baseball coach) (born 1943), member of the Northeastern University athletics Hall of Fame
- Dave Coleman (outfielder) (born 1950)

== See also ==
- David Colman (1949–2011), American neuroscientist
