= Jim Bell (ice hockey) =

American ice hockey player and head coach for the northeastern

Biographical details
- Born: Waltham, Massachusetts, U.S.
- Died: 1998
- Education: Northeastern University

Playing career
- 1946–1949: Northeastern
- 1949–1951: Boston Olympics
- 1954–1955: Worcester Warriors
- Position: Forward

Coaching career (HC unless noted)
- 1955–1970: Northeastern

Head coaching record
- Overall: 157–210–4 (.429)

James L. Bell was an American ice hockey player and head coach for the Northeastern.

== Career ==
Bell Started his playing career at Northeastern just after World War II. As a sophomore he was selected as a second team All-American and played three seasons for the Huskies before forgoing his final year of eligibility to play professionally. Bell returned to Northeastern and graduated in 1954 and after an 11-game stint with the Worcester Warriors he was chosen to succeed his former bench boss Herb Gallagher as coach of the Huskies.

Bell coached the men's team for fifteen seasons, producing respectable if unspectacular records. He led the team to its first two appearances in the ECAC Tournament but towards the end of his tenure the team was known more for losing than anything else. Bell resigned from his position after the Huskies finished dead last in 1969–70. After hockey Bell joined the engineering firm of Fenton G. Keyes Associates where he worked until his retirement.

Jim Bell was named as the New England Coach of the Year in 1956 and was the recipient of the Shaeffer Pen Award in 1970. He was an inaugural member of the Northeastern University Athletic Hall of Fame in 1974.

== Head coaching record ==
Record table
Season	Team	Overall	Conference	Standing	Postseason
Northeastern Huskies Independent (1955–1961)
1955–56	Northeastern	13–12–0			
1956–57	Northeastern	10–14–1			
1957–58	Northeastern	7–18–1			
1958–59	Northeastern	12–11–0			
1959–60	Northeastern	11–8–0			
1960–61	Northeastern	12–14–0			
Northeastern:		65–77–2			
Northeastern Huskies (ECAC Hockey) (1961–1970)
1961–62	Northeastern	7–17–0	7–16–0	23rd	
1962–63	Northeastern	9–17–0	9–16–0	20th	
1963–64	Northeastern	14–10–0	14–8–0	9th	
1964–65	Northeastern	18–10–0	11–8–0	6th	ECAC First Round
1965–66	Northeastern	16–12–1	9–8–1	8th	ECAC First Round
1966–67	Northeastern	12–14–0	9–11–0	11th	
1967–68	Northeastern	6–17–1	4–13–0	14th	
1968–69	Northeastern	7–16–0	4–14–0	15th	
1969–70	Northeastern	3–20–0	1–16–0	17th	
Northeastern:		92–133–2	68–110–1		
Total:		157–210–4			
National champion Postseason invitational champion Conference regular season champion Conference regular season and conference tournament champion Division regular season champion Division regular season and conference tournament champion Conference tournament champion

== Awards and honors ==
Award	Year
AHCA Second Team All-American	1947–48
