= Jim Walsh (ice hockey) =

American ice hockey player

- Born: October 26, 1956 (age 69) Norfolk, Virginia, U.S.
- Height: 6 ft 1 in (185 cm)
- Weight: 210 lb (95 kg; 15 st 0 lb)
- Position: Defense
- Shot: Right
- Played for: Buffalo Sabres
- NHL draft: Undrafted
- Playing career: 1979–1984

Jim Walsh (born October 26, 1956) is an American former professional ice hockey defenseman. After playing hockey at Northeastern University, he played four games in the National Hockey League with the Buffalo Sabres in the 1981–82 season, recording one assist and four penalty minutes.

Walsh was born in Norfolk, Virginia and raised near Boston, Massachusetts.

== Career statistics ==
=== Regular season and playoffs ===
			Regular season					Playoffs
Season	Team	League	GP	G	A	Pts	PIM	GP	G	A	Pts	PIM
1976–77	Northeastern University	ECAC	27	5	9	14	44	—	—	—	—	—
1977–78	Northeastern University	ECAC	27	3	26	29	69	—	—	—	—	—
1978–79	Northeastern University	ECAC	22	5	12	17	44	—	—	—	—	—
1979–80	Rochester Americans	AHL	33	2	4	6	64	—	—	—	—	—
1980–81	Rochester Americans	AHL	76	8	23	31	182	—	—	—	—	—
1981–82	Rochester Americans	AHL	70	7	33	40	174	9	0	4	4	17
1981–82	Buffalo Sabres	NHL	4	0	1	1	4	—	—	—	—	—
1982–83	Saginaw Gears	IHL	5	0	1	1	4	—	—	—	—	—
1982–83	Binghamton Whalers	AHL	49	1	13	14	93	—	—	—	—	—
1983–84	New Haven Nighthawks	AHL	13	0	5	5	14	—	—	—	—	—
AHL totals			241	18	78	96	527	9	0	4	4	17
NHL totals			4	0	1	1	4	—	—	—	—	—
