= Jérémy Davies =

Canadian ice hockey player (born 1996)

- Davies with the Rochester Americans in 2024
- Born: December 4, 1996 (age 29) Sainte-Anne-de-Bellevue, Quebec, Canada
- Height: 5 ft 11 in (180 cm)
- Weight: 180 lb (82 kg; 12 st 12 lb)
- Position: Defence
- Shoots: Left
- NHL team (P) Cur. team Former teams: Minnesota Wild; Iowa Wild (AHL); Nashville Predators; Buffalo Sabres
- NHL draft: 192nd overall, 2016; New Jersey Devils
- Playing career: 2019–present

Jérémy Davies (born December 4, 1996) is a Canadian professional ice hockey defenceman currently playing for the Iowa Wild in the American Hockey League (AHL) while under contract to the Minnesota Wild of the National Hockey League (NHL). He was selected by the New Jersey Devils in the seventh round, 192nd overall, of the 2016 NHL entry draft, and has previously played for the Nashville Predators and Buffalo Sabres.

== Personal life ==
Davies was born in Sainte-Anne-de-Bellevue, Quebec, Canada, to Mike Davies and Laura Gill and has one sister, Emily, who is also an accomplished hockey player.

== Playing career ==
=== Amateur ===
Davies jumped from the Lac St-Louis Lions of AAA minor league hockey in Quebec to the Waterloo Black Hawks of the United States Hockey League (USHL) after a tryout with the team. After eleven games with Waterloo during the 2014–15 season, in which he scored one goal and three assists for four points, Davies was traded to the Bloomington Thunder for defenceman Ethan Spaxman on November 17, 2014. He played in 43 games with Bloomington that season, scoring three goals and 20 points to complete his rookie season. In his second season with the Thunder in 2015–16, Davies led all USHL defencemen in scoring with 13 goals and 36 assists in 60 games and led the league with 24 assists on the power play, and was second overall in the league in overall power play scoring. Davies was named the USHL Defenseman of the Week three times (January 25, March 21, and March 28) and his play helped Bloomington to their first playoff appearance in franchise history. Davies was named to the First Team All-USHL, becoming Bloomington's first-ever All-USHL selection.

He played collegiate hockey for the Northeastern Huskies in the National Collegiate Athletic Association's Hockey East conference. In the 2016–17 Davies registered 8 goals and 23 points in 38 games. In his second season in 2017–18, Davies scored 6 goals and 35 points in 36 games, and assisted on three of Northeastern's goals in the team's first Beanpot championship since 1988. He was named a Hockey East First Team All-Star and CCM/ACHA First Team All-American in 2018. In his third and final season with Northeastern in 2018–19, he was named an alternate captain of the team. He scored 8 goals and 36 points in 37 games and was part of a second Northeastern Beanpot championship and Northeastern's Hockey East championship win over Boston College. Davies was named the HCA National Player of the Month for February 2019 and to the Hockey East All-Tournament Team. At season's end he was named a Hockey East First Team All-Star and a CCM/ACHA Second Team All-American. In his final season, he was nominated for the Hobey Baker Award.

=== Professional ===
Davies was selected by the New Jersey Devils of the National Hockey League (NHL) in the seventh round, 192nd overall, of the 2016 NHL entry draft. He signed a two-year entry level contract with the Devils on April 3, 2019 that would begin only during the 2019–20 season in order to not have to expose him in the upcoming 2021 NHL expansion draft. However, he was acquired by the Nashville Predators on June 22 in a trade along with defenceman Steven Santini and two second round draft picks from the Devils for defenceman P. K. Subban. Davies was assigned to Nashville's American Hockey League (AHL) affiliate, the Milwaukee Admirals for the 2019–20 season. He scored 4 goals and 28 points in 62 games before the season was cancelled due to the COVID-19 pandemic on March 11, 2020.

Due to the ongoing pandemic, the Admirals opted out of the 2020–21 season and Davies was instead assigned to the Chicago Wolves of the AHL. He appeared in nine games for the Wolves, registering nine points (all assists) before being recalled by the Predators on March 4, 2021, along with Rem Pitlick. He was added to the Predators taxi squad before making his debut on March 9 in a 3–2 overtime loss to the Carolina Hurricanes. He even saw time on Nashville's power play in his debut as the Predators were without star defenceman Roman Josi. He registered his first NHL assist and point on Luke Kunin's third period goal in a 3–0 victory over the Chicago Blackhawks on April 3. He played in 16 games with the Predators, marking just the one point. Davies was assigned to Milwaukee for the 2021–22 season. He scored 6 goals and 31 points in 51 games with Milwaukee. He was recalled in January 2022 and made his NHL season debut on January 18 in a 3–1 loss to the Vancouver Canucks. He appeared in six games with the Predators that season, registering two assists. He made nine appearances in the 2022 Calder Cup playoffs, marking six assists.

As a free agent from the Predators, Davies was signed to a one-year, two-way contract with the Buffalo Sabres on July 13, 2022. He was assigned to Buffalo's AHL affiliate, the Rochester Americans, for the 2022–23 season, appearing in 66 games, scoring 11 goals and 23 points. He was recalled by Buffalo in October when the team was dealing with a series of injuries on defence, but saw no playing time before returning to Rochester. He was recalled again on December 16 after injuries to Ilya Lyubushkin and Owen Power and made his Sabres debut on December 17 against in a 5–2 victory over the Arizona Coyotes. In the 2023 Calder Cup playoffs, Davies registered one goal and six points in fourteen playoff games. He re-signed with Buffalo in the offseason to a one-year, two-way contract on June 26, 2023. He played in 66 games with Rochester, scoring 12 goals and 35 points. He added one goal and an assist in five playoff games in the 2024 Calder Cup playoffs.

Davies left the Sabres as a free agent following two seasons, and was signed to a one-year, two-way contract with the Ottawa Senators on July 1, 2024. He passed through waivers, going unclaimed, and was assigned to Ottawa's AHL affiliate, the Belleville Senators, to start the 2024–25 season. He was selected to represent Belleville at the 2025 AHL All-Star Classic. He spent the entire season with Belleville, tallying 11 goals and 48 points in 72 games.

Following his lone season in the Senators organization, Davies agreed to terms on a two-year contract with the Vegas Golden Knights on July 2, 2025; however, due to salary-cap reasons, Davies was not formally signed by the team until October 5, instead signing an AHL contract for the interim period. He was placed on waivers and after going unclaimed, was assigned to Vegas' AHL affiliate, the Henderson Silver Knights. He spent the entire 2025–26 season with Henderson, tallying nine goals and 47 points in 72 games. The Silver Knights defeated the San Jose Barracuda in the first round of the 2026 Calder Cup playoffs, but were eliminated in the following series by the Colorado Eagles. In six playoff games with Henderson, Davies added two goals. Davies was assigned to Henderson to start the 2026–27 season after passing through waivers. In 14 games with Henderson he marked one goal and four points.

On November 16, 2026, Davies was traded to the Minnesota Wild in exchange for future considerations.

== Career statistics ==
			Regular season					Playoffs
Season	Team	League	GP	G	A	Pts	PIM	GP	G	A	Pts	PIM
2012–13	Lac St-Louis Lions	QMAAA	42	5	27	32	12	5	1	1	2	0
2013–14	Lac St-Louis Lions	QMAAA	42	7	26	33	74	16	4	15	19	28
2014–15	Waterloo Black Hawks	USHL	11	1	3	4	6	—	—	—	—	—
2014–15	Bloomington Thunder	USHL	43	3	17	20	70	—	—	—	—	—
2015–16	Bloomington Thunder	USHL	60	13	36	49	48	8	0	6	6	6
2016–17	Northeastern University	HE	38	8	15	23	38	—	—	—	—	—
2017–18	Northeastern University	HE	36	6	29	35	39	—	—	—	—	—
2018–19	Northeastern University	HE	37	8	28	36	41	—	—	—	—	—
2019–20	Milwaukee Admirals	AHL	62	4	24	28	46	—	—	—	—	—
2020–21	Chicago Wolves	AHL	9	0	9	9	6	—	—	—	—	—
2020–21	Nashville Predators	NHL	16	0	1	1	8	—	—	—	—	—
2021–22	Milwaukee Admirals	AHL	54	6	25	31	47	9	0	6	6	16
2021–22	Nashville Predators	NHL	6	0	2	2	2	—	—	—	—	—
2022–23	Rochester Americans	AHL	66	11	12	23	90	14	1	5	6	14
2022–23	Buffalo Sabres	NHL	1	0	0	0	2	—	—	—	—	—
2023–24	Rochester Americans	AHL	66	12	23	35	79	5	1	1	2	6
2024–25	Belleville Senators	AHL	72	11	37	48	44	—	—	—	—	—
2025–26	Henderson Silver Knights	AHL	72	9	38	47	74	6	2	0	2	0
2026–27	Henderson Silver Knights	AHL	14	1	3	4	4	—	—	—	—	—
NHL totals			23	0	3	3	12	—	—	—	—	—

== Awards and honours ==
Award	Year	Reference
QMAAA
Second All-Star Team	2014	
USHL
First All-Star Team	2016	
College
HE First All-Star Team	2018, 2019	
New England D1 All-Stars	2018	
East First All-American Team	2018	
East Second All-American Team	2019	
AHL
AHL All-Star Classic	2025	
