= Sandy Beadle =

Canadian ice hockey player (1960–1997)

- Born: July 12, 1960; Regina, Saskatchewan, Canada
- Died: August 6, 1997 (aged 37); Vinita, Oklahoma, U.S.
- Height: 6 ft 2 in (188 cm)
- Weight: 185 lb (84 kg; 13 st 3 lb)
- Position: Left wing
- Shot: Left
- Played for: Winnipeg Jets
- NHL draft: 149th overall, 1980; Winnipeg Jets
- Playing career: 1981–1984

Sandy James Beadle (July 12, 1960 — August 6, 1997) was a Canadian ice hockey left winger. During the 1980-81 season, he played in 6 games for the National Hockey League's Winnipeg Jets.

Beadle was born in Regina, Saskatchewan, Canada. Before joining the Jets, Beadle played junior with the Regina Pats, then played two seasons at Northeastern University in Boston, Massachusetts. Beadle scored 86 points in two seasons and was named All-American his sophomore season. Beadle played six games for Winnipeg in 1980–81 but played in the minor leagues until 1984. Beadle died at the early age of 37 on August 6, 1997, in Vinita, Oklahoma.

== Career statistics ==
=== Regular season and playoffs ===
			Regular season					Playoffs
Season	Team	League	GP	G	A	Pts	PIM	GP	G	A	Pts	PIM
1977–78	Estevan Bruins	SJHL	60	33	25	58	38	—	—	—	—	—
1978–79	Regina Pats	WHL	2	1	1	2	0	—	—	—	—	—
1978–79	Regina Pat Blues	SJHL	52	41	47	88	25	—	—	—	—	—
1979–80	Northeastern University	ECAC	23	11	16	27	6	—	—	—	—	—
1980–81	Northeastern University	ECAC	26	29	30	59	26	—	—	—	—	—
1980–81	Winnipeg Jets	NHL	6	1	0	1	2	—	—	—	—	—
1980–81	Tulsa Oilers	CHL	—	—	—	—	—	6	0	1	1	2
1981–82	Tulsa Oilers	CHL	54	12	21	33	34	3	0	0	0	7
1982–83	Fort Wayne Komets	IHL	13	3	10	13	11	—	—	—	—	—
1982–83	Sherbrooke Jets	AHL	9	2	3	5	0	—	—	—	—	—
1983–84	Sherbrooke Jets	AHL	70	2	5	7	8	—	—	—	—	—
NHL totals			6	1	0	1	2	—	—	—	—	—

== Awards and honors ==
Award	Year
All-ECAC Hockey First Team	1980–81
AHCA East All-American	1980–81
