= Dan McGillis =

Canadian ice hockey player (born 1972)

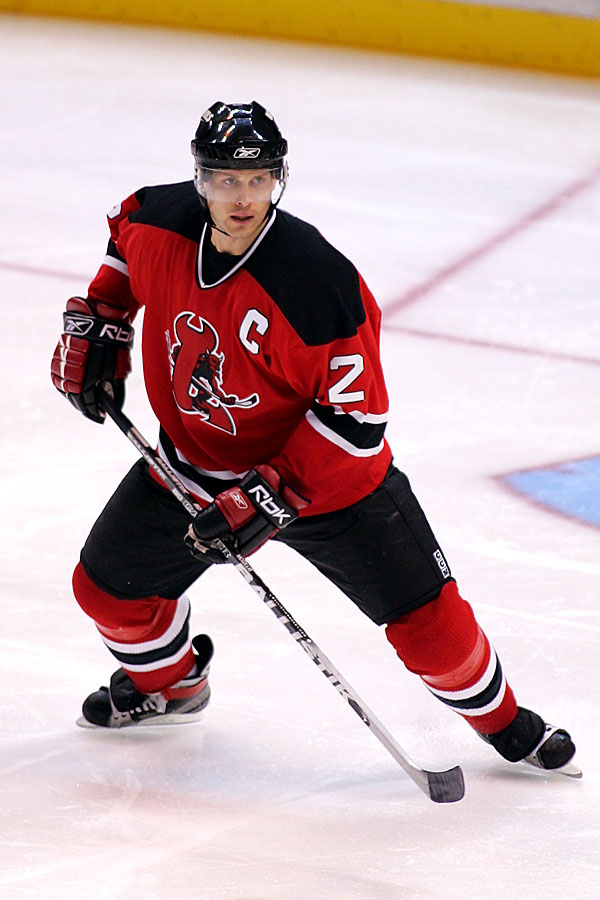
- McGillis with the Lowell Devils in 2006
- Born: July 1, 1972 (age 54) Hawkesbury, Ontario, Canada
- Height: 6 ft 3 in (191 cm)
- Weight: 220 lb (100 kg; 15 st 10 lb)
- Position: Defence
- Shot: Left
- Played for: Edmonton Oilers; Philadelphia Flyers; San Jose Sharks; Boston Bruins; New Jersey Devils; Adler Mannheim
- National team: Canada
- NHL draft: 238th overall, 1992; Detroit Red Wings
- Playing career: 1996–2010

Daniel Stewart McGillis (born July 1, 1972) is a Canadian former professional ice hockey player. He played nine seasons in the National Hockey League (NHL) for the Edmonton Oilers, Philadelphia Flyers, San Jose Sharks, Boston Bruins, and New Jersey Devils. He spent the final three seasons of his career playing for Adler Mannheim of the German Deutsche Eishockey Liga (DEL).

== Playing career ==
McGillis was drafted by the Detroit Red Wings in the 10th round, 238th overall in the 1992 NHL entry draft. After being drafted McGillis chose to play in the college ranks and played with Northeastern University for 4 years. While in college he earned Hockey East first All-Star team honors twice (1995, 1996) and an NCAA East First All-American team nomination in 1996.

During his senior season McGillis was traded by the Red Wings to the Edmonton Oilers for Kirk Maltby. After college McGillis joined the Oilers for the 1996–97 season and played 73 games, scoring 22 points. The following season he scored 25 points in 67 games with the Oilers before being traded to the Philadelphia Flyers. He appeared in 13 games with the Flyers, scoring 6 points.

McGillis scored a career high 49 points during the 2000–01 season and won the Barry Ashbee Trophy as the Flyers top defenceman. McGillis played for three different teams in the 2002–03 season. He started the year with the Flyers before being traded to the San Jose Sharks. After only 37 games with the Sharks McGillis was again traded, this time to the Boston Bruins. For the 2003–04 season McGillis scored 28 points in 80 games with the Bruins.

After the 2004–05 NHL lockout McGillis signed with the New Jersey Devils. McGillis played in only 27 games with the Devils during the 2005–06 season before being demoted to the Albany River Rats, due to the Devils' salary cap issues -- the first time in his career he was demoted to the minors -- and never played another game in the NHL. For the 2006–07 season McGillis spent the entire year with the Devils' new minor league affiliate Lowell Devils, scoring 41 points in 68 games.

On September 20, 2007, McGillis accepted an invitation from the Vancouver Canucks to attend their training camp. He was released by the team on October 1. He then signed with Adler Mannheim of the German Deutsche Eishockey Liga, for which he played three seasons before retiring.

== Career statistics ==
=== Regular season and playoffs ===
| | | | Regular season | | | | | Playoffs |
| Season | Team | League | GP | G | A | Pts | PIM | GP | G | A | Pts | PIM |
|---|---|---|---|---|---|---|---|---|---|---|---|---|
| 1989–90 | Hawkesbury Hawks | CJHL | 55 | 2 | 1 | 3 | 52 | — | — | — | — | — |
| 1990–91 | Hawkesbury Hawks | CJHL | 56 | 8 | 22 | 30 | 92 | — | — | — | — | — |
| 1991–92 | Hawkesbury Hawks | CJHL | 36 | 5 | 19 | 24 | 106 | — | — | — | — | — |
| 1992–93 | Northeastern Huskies | HE | 35 | 5 | 12 | 17 | 42 | — | — | — | — | — |
| 1993–94 | Northeastern Huskies | HE | 38 | 4 | 25 | 29 | 82 | — | — | — | — | — |
| 1994–95 | Northeastern Huskies | HE | 34 | 9 | 22 | 31 | 70 | — | — | — | — | — |
| 1995–96 | Northeastern Huskies | HE | 34 | 12 | 24 | 36 | 50 | — | — | — | — | — |
| 1996–97 | Edmonton Oilers | NHL | 73 | 6 | 16 | 22 | 52 | 12 | 0 | 5 | 5 | 24 |
| 1997–98 | Edmonton Oilers | NHL | 67 | 10 | 15 | 25 | 74 | — | — | — | — | — |
| 1997–98 | Philadelphia Flyers | NHL | 13 | 1 | 5 | 6 | 35 | 5 | 1 | 2 | 3 | 10 |
| 1998–99 | Philadelphia Flyers | NHL | 78 | 8 | 37 | 45 | 61 | 6 | 0 | 1 | 1 | 12 |
| 1999–2000 | Philadelphia Flyers | NHL | 68 | 4 | 14 | 18 | 55 | 18 | 2 | 6 | 8 | 12 |
| 2000–01 | Philadelphia Flyers | NHL | 82 | 14 | 35 | 49 | 86 | 6 | 1 | 0 | 1 | 6 |
| 2001–02 | Philadelphia Flyers | NHL | 75 | 5 | 14 | 19 | 46 | 5 | 1 | 0 | 1 | 8 |
| 2002–03 | Philadelphia Flyers | NHL | 24 | 0 | 3 | 3 | 20 | — | — | — | — | — |
| 2002–03 | San Jose Sharks | NHL | 37 | 3 | 13 | 16 | 30 | — | — | — | — | — |
| 2002–03 | Boston Bruins | NHL | 10 | 0 | 1 | 1 | 10 | 5 | 3 | 0 | 3 | 2 |
| 2003–04 | Boston Bruins | NHL | 80 | 5 | 23 | 28 | 65 | 7 | 0 | 0 | 0 | 2 |
| 2005–06 | New Jersey Devils | NHL | 27 | 0 | 6 | 6 | 36 | — | — | — | — | — |
| 2005–06 | Albany River Rats | AHL | 40 | 7 | 18 | 25 | 57 | — | — | — | — | — |
| 2006–07 | Lowell Devils | AHL | 68 | 10 | 31 | 41 | 62 | — | — | — | — | — |
| 2007–08 | Adler Mannheim | DEL | 41 | 3 | 8 | 11 | 108 | 5 | 0 | 0 | 0 | 8 |
| 2008–09 | Adler Mannheim | DEL | 47 | 3 | 16 | 19 | 88 | 9 | 2 | 3 | 5 | 12 |
| 2009–10 | Adler Mannheim | DEL | 14 | 2 | 2 | 4 | 47 | 2 | 0 | 0 | 0 | 0 |
| NHL totals | | | 634 | 56 | 182 | 238 | 570 | 64 | 8 | 14 | 22 | 76 |

=== International ===
| Year | Team | Event | GP | G | A | Pts | PIM |
|---|---|---|---|---|---|---|---|
| 2002 | Canada | WC | 5 | 0 | 1 | 1 | 2 |
| Senior totals | | | 5 | 0 | 1 | 1 | 2 |

== Awards and honours ==
| Award | Year |
|---|---|
| All-Hockey East Rookie Team | 1992–93 |
| All-Hockey East All-Star | 1994–95 |
| All-Hockey East All-Star | 1995–96 |
| AHCA East First-Team All-American | 1995–96 |
