= Scott Gruhl =

Canadian ice hockey player

- Born: September 13, 1959 (age 66) Port Colborne, Ontario, Canada
- Height: 6 ft 1 in (185 cm)
- Weight: 200 lb (91 kg; 14 st 4 lb)
- Position: Left wing
- Shot: Left
- Played for: Los Angeles Kings; Pittsburgh Penguins
- NHL draft: Undrafted
- Playing career: 1979–1996

Scott Gruhl (born September 13, 1959) is a Canadian former professional ice hockey player.

Gruhl was born in Port Colborne, Ontario. He played two years with Northeastern University, before joining the Sudbury Wolves for the 1978–79 season.

Gruhl turned professional in 1979 with the Saginaw Gears, after a tryout with the Binghamton Dusters. He would play until 1996 with various minor league professional teams. He earned two callups to the Los Angeles Kings and one with the Pittsburgh Penguins during his career.

== Career statistics ==
			Regular Season					Playoffs
Season	Team	League	GP	G	A	Pts	PIM	GP	G	A	Pts	PIM
1976-77	Northeastern University	ECAC	17	6	4	10	0	—	—	—	—	—
1977-78	Northeastern University	ECAC	28	21	38	59	46	—	—	—	—	—
1978–79	Sudbury Wolves	OHA	68	35	49	84	78	—	—	—	—	—
1979–80	Binghamton Dusters	AHL	4	1	0	1	6	—	—	—	—	—
1979–80	Saginaw Gears	IHL	75	53	40	93	100	7	2	6	8	16
1980–81	Saginaw Gears	IHL	77	56	34	90	87	13	11	8	19	12
1980–81	Houston Apollos	CHL	4	0	0	0	0	—	—	—	—	—
1981–82	New Haven Nighthawks	AHL	73	28	41	69	107	4	0	4	4	2
1981–82	Los Angeles Kings	NHL	7	2	1	3	2	—	—	—	—	—
1982–83	New Haven Nighthawks	AHL	68	25	38	63	114	12	3	3	6	22
1982–83	Los Angeles Kings	NHL	7	0	2	2	4	—	—	—	—	—
1983–84	Muskegon Mohawks	IHL	56	40	56	96	49	—	—	—	—	—
1984–85	Muskegon Lumberjacks	IHL	82	62	64	126	102	17	7	16	23	25
1985–86	Muskegon Lumberjacks	IHL	82	59	50	109	178	14	7	13	20	22
1986–87	Muskegon Lumberjacks	IHL	67	34	39	73	157	15	5	7	12	54
1987–88	Pittsburgh Penguins	NHL	6	1	0	1	0	—	—	—	—	—
1987–88	Muskegon Lumberjacks	IHL	55	28	47	75	115	6	5	1	6	12
1988–89	Muskegon Lumberjacks	IHL	79	37	55	92	163	14	8	11	19	37
1989–90	Muskegon Lumberjacks	IHL	80	41	51	92	206	15	8	6	14	26
1990–91	Fort Wayne Komets	IHL	59	23	47	70	109	19	4	6	10	39
1991–92	Fort Wayne Komets	IHL	78	44	61	105	196	6	2	2	4	48
1992–93	Fort Wayne Komets	IHL	73	34	47	81	290	12	4	11	15	14
1993–94	Kalamazoo Wings	IHL	30	15	12	27	85	5	1	4	5	26
1993–94	Milwaukee Admirals	IHL	28	6	9	15	102	—	—	—	—	—
1994–95	Richmond Renegades	ECHL	49	31	40	71	288	17	9	9	18	68
1995–96	Richmond Renegades	ECHL	60	46	39	85	236	7	3	5	8	18
1995–96	Baltimore Bandits	AHL	1	0	0	0	0	—	—	—	—	—
1995–96	Fort Wayne Komets	IHL	—	—	—	—	—	2	0	1	1	0
IHL totals			921	532	612	1144	1939	145	64	92	156	331
NHL totals			20	3	3	6	6	—	—	—	—	—

== Awards ==
- IHL Second All-Star Team (1980, 1986, 1992)
- IHL First All-Star Team (1984, 1985)
- James Gatschene Memorial Trophy (MVP - IHL) (1985)
