= Rob Cowie =

Canadian ice hockey player

- Born: November 3, 1967 (age 58) Willowdale, Ontario, Canada
- Height: 6 ft 1 in (185 cm)
- Weight: 195 lb (88 kg; 13 st 13 lb)
- Position: Defence
- Shot: Left
- Played for: Los Angeles Kings; HC La Chaux-de-Fonds; Eisbären Berlin; Jokerit; EV Zug; HC Milano
- NHL draft: Undrafted
- Playing career: 1991–2004

Robert "Cowboy" Cowie (born November 3, 1967) is a Canadian former professional ice hockey defenceman. He played 78 games in the National Hockey League with the Los Angeles Kings during the 1994–95 and 1995–96 seasons. The rest of his career, which lasted from 1991 to 2004, was spent in the minor leagues and then in various European leagues.

== College career ==
Cowie was born in Willowdale, Ontario. As a youth, he played in the 1980 Quebec International Pee-Wee Hockey Tournament with a minor ice hockey team from Goulding Park in Toronto. He was a four-year letterman for the Northeastern University Huskies between 1988 and 1991, scoring over 40 points each of his sophomore, junior and senior seasons. He finished his college career with 46 goals and 96 assists for 142 points in 139 games, and is the second leading scorer and fourteenth leading overall scorer in school history. He was named an All-Hockey East All-Star in 1988, 1989 and 1990, and was named an All-American in 1990.

== Professional career ==
After his college career ended, Cowie signed with the Winnipeg Jets and was assigned to their Moncton Hawks farm team in the American Hockey League. He quickly established himself as an offensive defenseman in the minors, never scoring less than 11 goals in a full season for the whole of his minor league career. His best season as a pro came in the final season for the storied Springfield Indians in 1994, when as an assistant captain for the club he scored 17 goals and 57 assists for 74 points and was named a First Team All-Star on defense.

Following that season, Cowie signed with the Los Angeles Kings, and saw his first NHL action in 1995, splitting the 1995 and 1996 seasons between Los Angeles and the Kings' minor league affiliate, the Phoenix Roadrunners. Cowie's first NHL goal was assisted by his Kings teammate Wayne Gretzky.

After the 1996 season, Cowie spent the rest of his playing career in Europe, most notably with Eisbären Berlin, for whom he played four seasons between 1998 and 2002. He retired after the 2004 season when he played in the Italian team Milano Vipers.

Cowie's National Hockey League totals were 7 goals and 12 assists for 19 points in 72 games.

== Post-professional career ==
Since retiring as a player, Cowie has remained active in the sport as a scout, first part-time for the New York Islanders and then as a full-time pro scout for the Toronto Maple Leafs. He is also a founder of Athletes Resource, a sports services organization. The company hosts an annual hockey prospects tournament and professional conditioning camps attended by players from the NHL and other professional leagues. In the private sector, Rob formed The Muskoka Group, a Real Estate group he runs in Scottsdale Arizona in conjunction with Prudential AZ Properties. Rob has won the Chairman's Circle Gold award, indicative of the top, for 2008, 2009, and 2010.

== Career statistics ==
=== Regular season and playoffs ===
			Regular season					Playoffs
Season	Team	League	GP	G	A	Pts	PIM	GP	G	A	Pts	PIM
1985–86	St. Michael's Buzzers	MetJBHL	31	9	23	32	24	—	—	—	—	—
1986–87	St. Michael's Buzzers	MetJBHL	36	25	32	57	55	—	—	—	—	—
1987–88	Northeastern University	HE	36	7	8	15	38	—	—	—	—	—
1988–89	Northeastern University	HE	36	7	34	41	60	—	—	—	—	—
1989–90	Northeastern University	HE	34	14	31	45	54	—	—	—	—	—
1990–91	Northeastern University	HE	33	18	23	41	56	—	—	—	—	—
1991–92	Moncton Hawks	AHL	64	11	30	41	89	5	1	1	2	0
1992–93	Moncton Hawks	AHL	67	12	20	32	91	5	3	5	8	2
1993–94	Springfield Indians	AHL	78	17	57	74	124	6	3	6	9	4
1994–95	Los Angeles Kings	NHL	32	2	7	9	20	—	—	—	—	—
1994–95	Phoenix Roadrunners	IHL	51	14	33	47	71	—	—	—	—	—
1995–96	Los Angeles Kings	NHL	46	5	5	10	32	—	—	—	—	—
1995–96	Phoenix Roadrunners	IHL	22	2	17	19	48	4	1	3	4	0
1996–97	HC La Chaux-de-Fonds	NLA	39	18	18	36	100	—	—	—	—	—
1997–98	Eisbären Berlin	DEL	39	11	30	41	78	10	3	5	8	16
1998–99	Eisbären Berlin	DEL	49	14	29	43	72	8	3	3	6	30
1999–00	Eisbären Berlin	DEL	52	14	23	37	101	—	—	—	—	—
2000–01	Eisbären Berlin	DEL	58	14	30	44	100	—	—	—	—	—
2001–02	Jokerit	FIN	41	11	10	21	74	—	—	—	—	—
2001–02	EV Zug	NLA	—	—	—	—	—	6	1	4	5	10
2002–03	HC Milano	ITA	25	12	12	24	24	8	3	5	8	2
2003–04	SC Riessersee	GER-2	13	1	3	4	24	—	—	—	—	—
2003–04	HC Milano	ITA	20	6	18	23	18	12	3	6	9	4
AHL totals			209	40	107	147	304	16	7	12	19	6
DEL totals			208	53	112	165	351	18	6	8	14	46
NHL totals			78	7	12	19	52	—	—	—	—	—

== Awards and honors ==
Award	Year
All-Hockey East Second Team	1988–89
All-Hockey East First Team	1989–90
AHCA East First-Team All-American	1989–90
All-Hockey East Second Team	1990–91

- Cowie was inducted into the Northeastern University Hall of Fame in 2005.
