= Art Chisholm =

American ice hockey player (born 1934)

- Born: November 11, 1934 (age 90); Arlington, Massachusetts, U.S.
- Height: 5 ft 9 in (175 cm)
- Weight: 160 lb (73 kg; 11 st 6 lb)
- Position: Centre
- Shot: Left
- Played for: Boston Bruins
- Playing career: 1961–1967

Arthur Joseph Chisholm (born November 11, 1934) is an American former professional ice hockey player who briefly played for the Boston Bruins of the National Hockey League in 1961. He was inducted into the Northeastern University athletics Hall of Fame in 1977.

== Amateur career ==
Following his high school days at Arlington High School, Chisholm was a two-time All-American at Northeastern and was voted to the All-New England, All-East, and Team MVP award for his three seasons. Chisholm also won the Walter J. Brown Award for the most outstanding American college hockey player in New England. Chisholm still holds the Huskies' record for career goals and single-season goals (40), despite playing far fewer games than anyone else on the team's top career scoring lists; during Chisholm's career, freshmen were not allowed to play on the varsity.

== Professional career ==
Chisholm played briefly for the Bruins during the 1961 season with a 3-game amateur try-out contract. It would prove to be his only professional hockey action, and other than a single season of local senior hockey in 1966, he never again played organized hockey.

== Career statistics ==
=== Regular season and playoffs ===
			Regular season					Playoffs
Season	Team	League	GP	G	A	Pts	PIM	GP	G	A	Pts	PIM
1951–52	Arlington North Shore High School	HS-MA	13	0	0	0	0	2	0	0	0	0
1954–55	Arlington Military Aces	MBSHL	8	8	4	12	—	—	—	—	—	—
1958–59	Northeastern University	NCAA	23	40	25	65	35	—	—	—	—	—
1959–60	Northeastern University	NCAA	24	25	31	56	15	—	—	—	—	—
1960–61	Northeastern University	NCAA	25	35	26	61	25	—	—	—	—	—
1960–61	Boston Bruins	NHL	3	0	0	0	0	—	—	—	—	—
1965–66	Framingham Pics	MASHL	25	28	36	64	—	—	—	—	—	—
NHL totals			3	0	0	0	0	—	—	—	—	—

== Awards and honors ==
Award	Year
AHCA East All-American	1959–60
AHCA East All-American	1960–61
