= Herb Gallagher =

American ice hockey and baseball coach, administrator

Biographical details
- Born: January 30, 1911
- Died: October 25, 1992 (aged 81)

Playing career

Ice hockey
- 1931–1934: Northeastern
- Position: Center

Coaching career (HC unless noted)

Ice hockey
- 1936–1942: Northeastern
- 1946–1955: Northeastern

Baseball
- 1938–1942: Northeastern
- 1946–1955: Northeastern

Administrative career (AD unless noted)
- 1955–1976: Northeastern

Head coaching record
- Overall: 108–122–6 (ice hockey); 140–105–2 (baseball)

Accomplishments and honors

Records
- Military career
- Allegiance: United States of America
- Branch: United States Navy
- Service years: 1942–1945
- Rank: Lt. commander

Herbert Wendell Gallagher (January 30, 1911 – October 25, 1992) was an American ice hockey and baseball coach and college athletics administrator. He served two stints as the head ice hockey coach at Northeastern University, from 1936 to 1942 and 1946 to 1955. Gallagher was also the head baseball coach at Northeastern from 1938 to 1942 and from 1946 to 1955. He was the school's athletic director from 1955 to 1976 and a backfield coach for the football program.

== Career ==
Gallagher arrived at Northeastern University in 1929 after graduating from Newton High School and swiftly became a local sports legend. By the time he graduated in 1935 he had earned nine letters across three sports (baseball, ice hockey and soccer). Over the next year Gallagher played in both Provincial Baseball League and the English National League before accepting the coaching position with the Austrian national team for the 1936 Winter Olympics. Gallagher lead the team to the second round and a 7th-place finish in the 16-team field and had planned on staying in Europe for the remainder of the decade but was convinced to return to the states due to the possibility of war.

Gallagher returned to Northeastern as a professor of physical education and economics and took on three separate coaching roles with the hockey, baseball and football programs. He worked at the university for six years before leaving after the outbreak of World War II.

While baseball coach at Northeastern, he played summer baseball in the Cape Cod Baseball League. He pitched for Harwich in 1938, and in 1939 returned to the league as Bourne's player-manager. He was a league all-star in 1939, playing infield and also pitching for Bourne. As a pitcher he possessed "fine control" and "an effective curve," and as an all-around ball player it was reported that "they don't come any headier or smarter than Gallagher."

Gallagher joined the Navy and rose to the rank of Lieutenant Commander. He returned to Boston after the war and resumed his coaching duties in 1946. Gallagher was named as the New England hockey coach of the year in 1948 and shortly afterwards became one of the driving forces behind the formation of the Beanpot an annual ice hockey tournament held between the four Boston-area programs. In 1955 he was named as Athletic Director for NU and over the next twenty one years worked to raise the profile of the school's programs. In that time he was also on the NCAA Ice Hockey Rules Committee and the USOC for the 1956 Winter Olympics.

Gallagher has been honored several times, including being inducted into the Northeastern University Athletic Hall of Fame in 1975, and receiving the Hobey Baker Legend of Hockey award in 1985 and the John "Snooks" Kelley Founders Award in 1991. An annual award named in his honor is given out by the New England Hockey Writers Association to the best forward in the region.

== Head coaching record ==
=== Ice hockey ===
Record table
Season	Team	Overall	Conference	Standing	Postseason
Northeastern Huskies Independent (1936–1942)
1936–37	Northeastern	6–3–1			
1937–38	Northeastern	3–9–1			
1938–39	Northeastern	8–6–0			
1939–40	Northeastern	7–4–0			
1940–41	Northeastern	6–3–0			
1941–42	Northeastern	7–5–0			
Northeastern:		37–30–2			
Northeastern Huskies Independent (1946–1955)
1946–47	Northeastern	5–9–0			
1947–48	Northeastern	10–9–0			
1948–49	Northeastern	9–7–0			
1949–50	Northeastern	7–10–1			
1950–51	Northeastern	8–11–0			
1951–52	Northeastern	11–10–0			
1952–53	Northeastern	9–10–2			
1953–54	Northeastern	5–12–1			
1954–55	Northeastern	7–14–0			
Northeastern:		71–92–4			
Total:		108–122–6			

Awards and achievements
Preceded by Murray Armstrong	Hobey Baker Legends of College Hockey Award; 1985	Succeeded by Amo Bessone
