= David Robert Coleman =

British conductor and composer

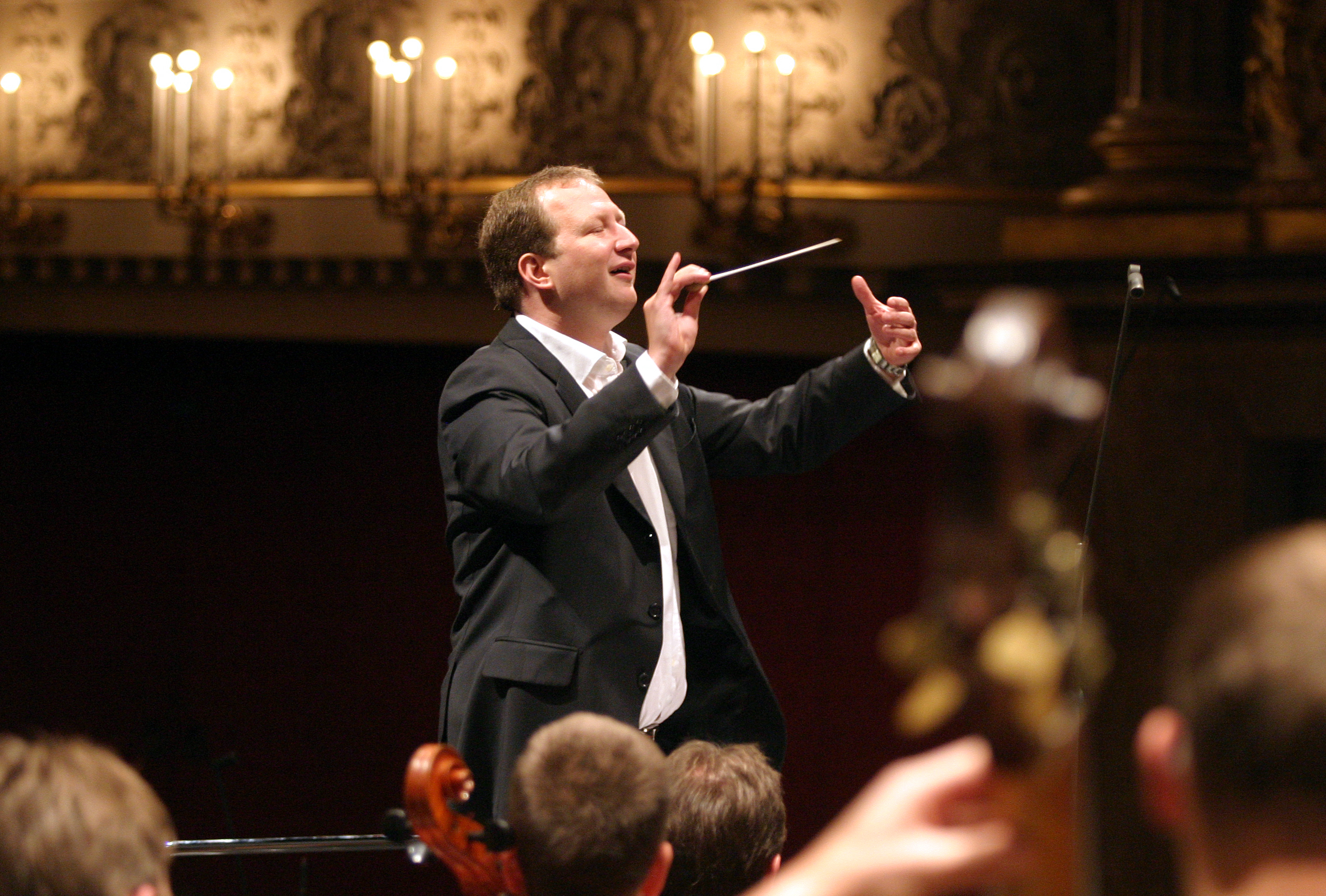

David Robert Coleman (born 1969, London) is a British conductor and composer.

== Biography ==
David Robert Coleman was born in 1969 into an English-German family in London. After studies at the Royal College of Music Junior Department, he studied music at King's College, Cambridge (MA) and returned to the Royal College of Music as a postgraduate, where he studied conducting with Christopher Adey and Edwin Roxburgh. At the RCM he was awarded the August Mannes and Constant & Kit Lambert prizes for conducting.

In 1993 he emigrated to Germany. Initially he worked as a repetiteur in the opera houses in Innsbruck, Nuremberg and Mannheim as well as being an assistant conductor at the SWR Sinfonieorchester Baden-Baden and Freiburg. As a composer David Robert Coleman did some work with Wolfgang Rihm in Karlsruhe and Hans Zender in Freiburg. In 2001 he was a winner in the Frankfurt Opera's competition 'Five Movements' and received a composers' residency in Schloss Solitude Stuttgart.

From 2006 to 2009 he was a conductor and assistant of Kent Nagano at the Bavarian State Opera in Munich. From 2010 to 2018 he worked as a conductor, composer and pianist at the Berlin State Opera under Daniel Barenboim. At the Staatsoper Berlin he conducted two new of operas by Salvatore Sciarrino that were directed by Jürgen Flimm. In addition, he conducted repertoire opera performances.

Since 1998 David Robert Coleman has been invited as a guest conductor with German and international orchestras such as Frankfurt Radio Orchestra (HR-Sinfonieorchester), Montreal Symphony Orchestra, London Philharmonic, Tokyo Symphony Orchestra, State Orchestra Saarbrücken, Ensemble Modern, Mainz State Orchestra, Berliner Symphoniker, Philharmonie Szczecin, Youth Orchestra of the Americas, Musikfabrik Köln, Philharmonie Bremen.

His music is published by Editions Alphonse Leduc and Ries & Erler Berlin.

== Selected works ==
- Starry Night for piano and small orchestra (1999 premiere SWR Symphony Orchestra Freiburg)
- 'Herzkammeroper'. Opera sketch. 2001 Commission Frankfurt Opera
- 'Deux' for Ensemble. Commission Ensemble Intercontemporain 2003
- Rhapsody for Clarinet and Orchestra 'Ibergang'. Commission OSM Montreal 2007
- 'Hans im Glück'. Chamber Opera. Commission Berlin State Opera
- 'Looking for Palestine' for voice and orchestra. Commission Daniel Barenboim and the Divan Orchestra. London Proms and Salzburg Festival 2018
- 'The House of Dr Hoffmann'. Opera. Brandenburg Theatre 2019
- 'Piano Concerto in Four Movements' for Saleem Ashkar. Commission Kammerakademie Potsdam 2021
- New Orchestration of the London Scene from Alban Berg's 'Lulu' 2012. Commission Daniel Barenboim and Berlin State Opera

== Recordings ==
- Starry Night. Music by David Robert Coleman (Naxos)
- Mieczyslaw Weinberg Complete Flute Concerti with Claudia Stein and Szczecin Philharmonic
