= Ray Picard =

American ice hockey goalie

D. Raymond "Ray" Picard (born January 4, 1928) is a member of the Northeastern University athletics Hall of Fame. Picard was elected in 1977 for his exploits as a hockey goalie. Picard was a two time All-American for the Huskies, the first All-American at Northeastern.

Before coming to Huntington Avenue Picard spent two years in the Marine Corps. He also honed his hockey skills for the Boston Junior Olympics and was also voted that Most Valuable Player in the 1948 US Amateur Championships.

At Northeastern, Picard besides being named All-American twice, also won the Leonard M. Fowle Award, for New England's Most Outstanding Player and the Walter A. Brown Award for Most Outstanding American College Hockey Player in New England.

In 1953, Picard signed a contract with the Boston Bruins and he played a season for their farm team the Worcester Warriors in the 1953-54 season, where he played 13 games.

== Awards and honors ==
Award	Year
AHCA First Team All-American	1950–51
AHCA First Team All-American	1951–52
