= Marc Robitaille (ice hockey) =

Canadian ice hockey player

- Born: June 7, 1976 (age 50) Gloucester, Ontario, Canada
- Height: 5 ft 10 in (178 cm)
- Weight: 185 lb (84 kg; 13 st 3 lb)
- Position: Goaltender
- Caught: Left
- Played for: St. John's Maple Leafs
- Playing career: 1996–2000

Marc Robitaille (born June 7, 1976) is a Canadian former ice hockey goaltender who was an All-American for Northeastern.

== Career ==
Robitaille bounced around in his junior career, playing for three separate teams, mostly as a backup. In his final year of eligibility, he received significant playing time with the Gloucester Rangers and posted strong numbers. He began attending Northeastern University the following year, serving as the Huskies starter as a freshman. In the program's first season under Bruce Crowder, Northeastern wasn't good and finished last in the Hockey East standings. The team saw a huge turnaround the following year and the team posted its first 20-win season in a decade. Robitaille was in net for each of those victories and lowered his goals against average by more than a goal per game. The massive swing to their success led the Toronto Maple Leafs to offer Robitaille a professional contract after the season. He jumped at the chance and ended his college career after being named an All-American.

In his first season with the Leafs, Robitaille was assigned to their AHL affiliate in St. John's. He split time in goal with two other netminders and while he did end up playing the most minutes, Robitaille did not distinguish himself as the top goalie on the team. His second season with the club turned out even worse and he watched most of the games from the bench after his GAA ballooned. Rather than continue his playing career, Robitaille retired after the season at the age of 23.

Robitaille returned home and began attending the University of Ottawa, graduating with a degree in business administration in 2003. He went on to work in the energy industry, mostly as a trader, spending nearly 12 years with Brookfield Renewable Partners.

== Statistics ==
=== Regular season and playoffs ===
			Regular season									Playoffs
Season	Team	League	GP	W	L	T	MIN	GA	SO	GAA	SV%	GP	W	L	MIN	GA	SO	GAA	SV%
1992–93	Hawkesbury Hawks	CJHL	15	4	5	0	710	67	0	5.66	—	—	—	—	—	—	—	—	—
1993–94	Hawkesbury Hawks	CJHL	14	3	7	1	708	50	0	4.24	—	—	—	—	—	—	—	—	—
1993–94	Smiths Falls Bears	CJHL	8	5	2	1	444	22	1	2.97	—	—	—	—	—	—	—	—	—
1994–95	Smiths Falls Bears	CJHL	20	—	—	—	—	—	—	—	—	—	—	—	—	—	—	—	—
1995–96	Smiths Falls Bears	CJHL	35	23	11	0	2000	96	5	2.94	—	—	—	—	—	—	—	—	—
1996–97	Northeastern	Hockey East	34	7	24	3	1928	135	3	4.20	.884	—	—	—	—	—	—	—	—
1997–98	Northeastern	Hockey East	39	21	15	3	2313	123	1	3.19	.904	—	—	—	—	—	—	—	—
1998–99	St. John's Maple Leafs	AHL	42	13	22	2	2269	124	1	3.28	.898	3	—	—	—	—	—	3.04	.889
1999–00	St. John's Maple Leafs	AHL	27	3	12	4	1369	93	0	4.08	.895	—	—	—	—	—	—	—	—
NCAA totals			73	28	39	6	4,241	258	4	3.65	.894	—	—	—	—	—	—	—	—
AHL totals			69	16	34	5	3,638	217	1	3.58	.897	3	—	—	—	—	—	3.04	.889

== Awards and honors ==
Award	Year
All-Hockey East First Team	1997–98
AHCA East First-Team All-American	1997–98
