= Jim Averill =

American ice hockey player

- Born: 1963 (age 62–63) Wayland, Massachusetts, USA
- Height: 5 ft 10 in (178 cm)
- Weight: 170 lb (77 kg; 12 st 2 lb)
- Position: Defenseman
- Played for: Northeastern
- Playing career: 1981–1985

James Averill (born 1963) is an American retired ice hockey defenseman who was an All-American for Northeastern.

== Career ==
When he graduated from Wayland High School in 1981, Averill was already a local hockey star. He was a Dual County MVP and had made the All-scholastic team while being a three-sports standout for the Warriors. He began attending Northeastern University the following fall and joined the ice hockey team just in time for the program's surprising jump into the big time. Prior to the 1981–82 season, the Huskies had never won a playoff game and had no 20-win seasons in nearly 50 years of play. Averill's arrival coincided with the Huskies winning the east region and finishing second the 17-team ECAC Hockey. For the first time in their history, Northeastern was able to play a home-site playoff game and used a big performance by their defense to propel themselves to not only a postseason victory, but won the ECAC Tournament, reaching the NCAA Tournament for the first time. While the offense had led the Huskies during the regular season, it was their defense that carried them to victory in March; NU allowed just two goals in each of their three games (half of when they averaged during the regular season).

For their already stellar season, Northeastern received the top eastern seed and were matched against an underestimated Bowling Green in the quarterfinals. The teams fought to a 2–2 draw in the first match and repeated the performance in game two. With the score evenly knotted, the Huskies played the longest game in program history to that point, needing three overtimes to decide the winner. In the end Averill got to raise his arms in celebration as Northeastern scored the winner and sent the Huskies into the frozen four. In the national semifinal, Northeastern's magical run finally ended with a 2–6 drubbing at the hands of eventual champion North Dakota. The Huskies were sent to the consolation game and took their frustration out on ECAC runner-up New Hampshire to the tune of 10–4.

Unfortunately for Averill, Northeastern reverted to type after 1982 and the Huskies missed the postseason entirely the next two years. While the team wasn't very good, Averill led the defensive corps in scoring for three straight years, ending his time with the Huskies as an All-American in 1985 and finishing as the then-second highest scoring defenseman in program history. Averill retired as a player after graduating and was inducted into the Northeastern athletic Hall of Fame in 2002.

== Statistics ==
=== Regular season and playoffs ===
			Regular Season					Playoffs
Season	Team	League	GP	G	A	Pts	PIM	GP	G	A	Pts	PIM
1980–81	Wayland High School	MA-HS	—	—	—	—	—	—	—	—	—	—
1981–82	Northeastern	ECAC Hockey	35	1	22	23	0	—	—	—	—	—
1982–83	Northeastern	ECAC Hockey	28	6	20	26	14	—	—	—	—	—
1983–84	Northeastern	ECAC Hockey	28	4	27	31	26	—	—	—	—	—
1984–85	Northeastern	Hockey East	35	8	30	38	40	—	—	—	—	—
NCAA totals			126	19	99	118	80	—	—	—	—	—

== Awards and honors ==
Award	Year
All-Hockey East First Team	1984–85
AHCA East Second-Team All-American	1984–85
