= Ken Manchurek =

Canadian ice hockey player

- Born: November 12, 1961 (age 64) Windsor, Ontario, Canada
- Height: 5 ft 11 in (180 cm)
- Weight: 175 lb (79 kg; 12 st 7 lb)
- Position: Left wing
- Played for: Northeastern
- Playing career: 1980–1984

Ken Manchurek (born November 12, 1961) is a Canadian retired ice hockey left wing who was an All-American for Northeastern.

== Career ==
Manchurek began attending Northeastern University in the fall of 1980 and posted decent numbers as a freshman. The following year Manchurek doubled his point production and helped the Huskies to their best season in history. The team finished 2nd in ECAC Hockey winning their division and posting the program's first 20-win season. NU won all three of their conference playoff games to win the first conference championship in program history. Northeastern received the top eastern seed for the NCAA Tournament and won a very close quarterfinal series over Bowling Green. Northern's run ended with a loss in the national semifinal but then won the consolation game to finish the tournament in 3rd place. In the six succeeding NCAA appearances for the Huskies, NU has yet to win another tournament game (as of 2021).

The miraculous run Northeastern had in 1982 couldn't be sustained and the team sank to 12th in the standings the following year. Manchurek, however, still put up good numbers and led the Huskies in scoring. He was named team captain for his senior season, again leading the club in scoring, and was named an All-American. Manchurek retired as a player once his four years of varsity play were up and he graduated the next year with a degree in business. he was inducted into the Northeastern Athletic hall of Fame in 2006.

== Statistics ==
=== Regular season and playoffs ===
			Regular Season					Playoffs
Season	Team	League	GP	G	A	Pts	PIM	GP	G	A	Pts	PIM
1980–81	Northeastern	ECAC Hockey	26	9	14	23	30	—	—	—	—	—
1981–82	Northeastern	ECAC Hockey	31	21	25	46	0	—	—	—	—	—
1982–83	Northeastern	ECAC Hockey	25	19	23	42	29	—	—	—	—	—
1983–84	Northeastern	ECAC Hockey	29	27	24	51	24	—	—	—	—	—
NCAA totals			111	76	86	162	83	—	—	—	—	—

== Awards and honors ==
Award	Year
AHCA East Second-Team All-American	1983–84
