= Rod Isbister =

- Born: March 29, 1963 (age 62); Windsor, Ontario
- Height: 175 cm (5 ft 9 in)
- Weight: 82 kg (181 lb; 12 st 13 lb)
- Position: Forward
- Shot: Right
- Played for: St. Catharines Saints
- Playing career: 1986–1986

Rodney J. Isbister (born March 29, 1963) is a member of the Northeastern University athletics Hall of Fame. He was inducted in 2003 for his accomplishments in ice hockey.

Isbister was one of the offensive leaders for the Northeastern Huskies. In his freshman year he scored 11 goals and 24 assists for 35 points, a scoring figure exceeded by only two previous Husky freshmen. He was named NU's Rookie of the Year for the season.

During Isbister's sophomore campaign the Huskies won the second ever Beanpot championship. For the season Isbister scored 19 goals and 25 assists for 44 points. He was named to the All-New England team.

Isbister helped to make Northeastern history as the Huskies won their first, back-to-back Beanpot Championships in 1985. He assisted on the third and fourth goals as the Huskies defeated Boston University in the championship game, 4-2. He led the team with 22 goals and 32 assists for 54 points. During the season Isbister was named to the first ever All-Hockey East team and All-New England team.

Isbister's senior season proved to be his best, scoring 27 goals and 29 assists for 56 points to make his career point total 189, which still remains third in the NU record book.

After Northeastern, Isbister played six games in the AHL with the St. Catharines Saints. In 2003, he was elected to the Beanpot Hall of Fame, only the seventh player from Northeastern to be elected.

== Awards and honors ==
Award	Year
All-Hockey East First Team	1984–85
