= Brad Thiessen =

Canadian ice hockey player (born 1986)

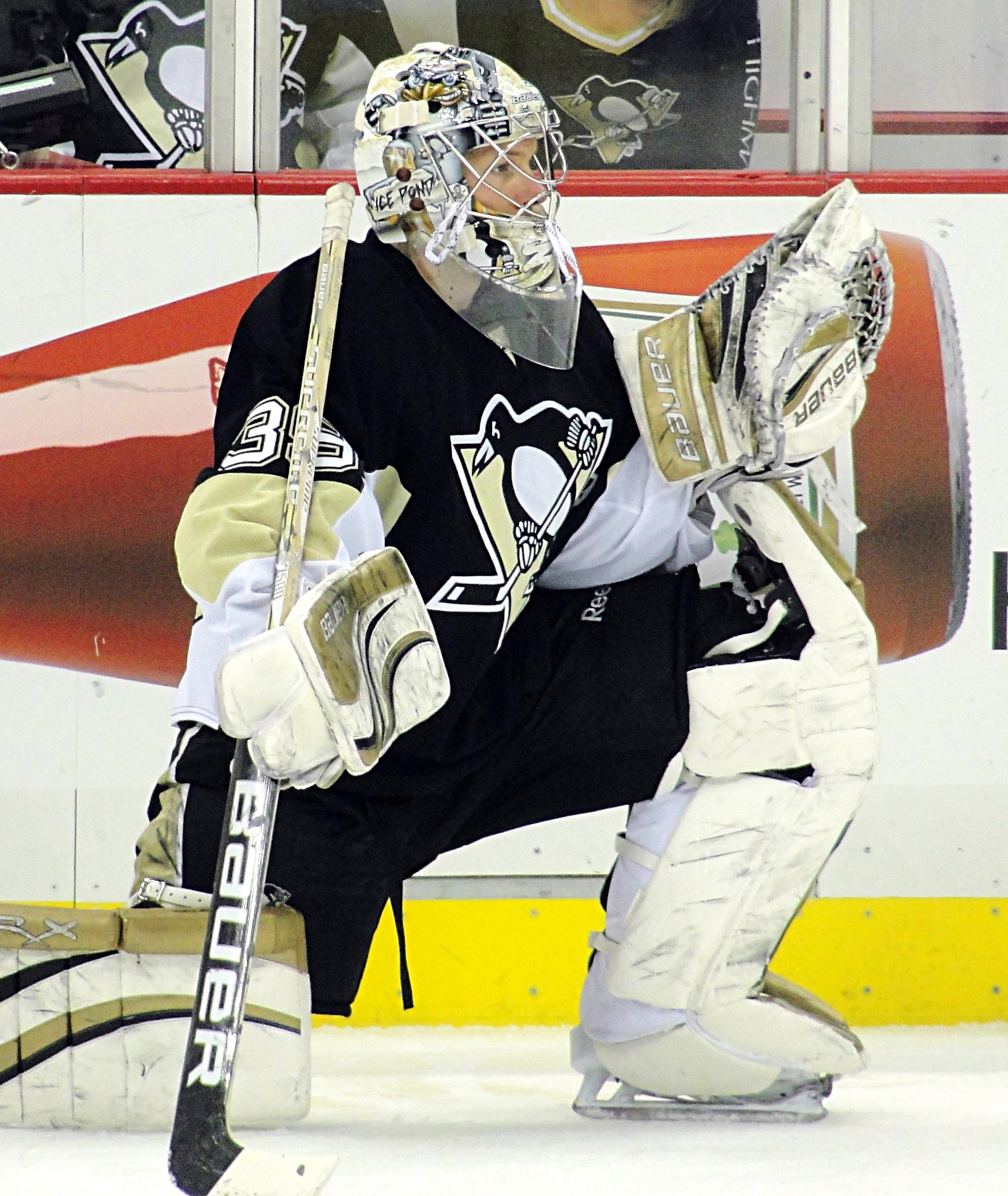
- Thiessen with the Pittsburgh Penguins in 2012
- Born: March 19, 1986 (age 40) Aldergrove, British Columbia, Canada
- Height: 6 ft 0 in (183 cm)
- Weight: 180 lb (82 kg; 12 st 12 lb)
- Position: Goaltender
- Caught: Left
- Played for: Pittsburgh Penguins; HIFK
- NHL draft: Undrafted
- Playing career: 2009–2021

Brad Thiessen (born March 19, 1986) is a Canadian former professional ice hockey goaltender who played briefly in the National Hockey League (NHL) with the Pittsburgh Penguins.

Thiessen played three seasons in the British Columbia Hockey League before playing three seasons of collegiate ice hockey at Northeastern University. In his junior season at Northeastern, Thiessen was named Hockey East Player of the Year, a conference all-star, an NCAA first-team All-American, and a Hobey Baker Award "hat trick" finalist. At the end of the 2008–09 season, Thiessen signed a contract with the Pittsburgh Penguins as an undrafted free agent.

== Playing career ==
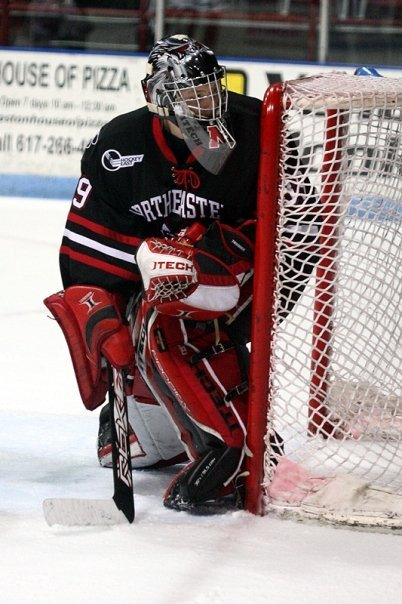
Thiessen with the Northeastern University Huskies in 2008.

=== Amateur ===
Thiessen played three seasons in the junior A British Columbia Hockey League. In 2003–04 with the Penticton Panthers, Thiessen appeared in 42 games, finishing with a record of 13–17–1. The following season with the Prince George Spruce Kings, he finished 12–22–1. In his final season of junior hockey with the Prince George Spruce Kings and Merritt Centennials in 2005–06 (he was traded during the season), Thiessen achieved career best statistics with a 22–21–4 record, a 2.88 goals against average, and a .922 save percentage.

After junior hockey, Thiessen played for Northeastern University in Boston, Massachusetts for three seasons, from 2006 to 2009.

During his freshman season in 2006–07, Thiessen was named to the Hockey East All-Rookie team. That season he appeared in 33 games, earning an 11–17–5 record. The next season, he was 16–17–3.

In Thiessen's junior year during the 2008–09 season, he led the team to one of its most successful seasons, including its first trip to the NCAA tournament in over 15 years. He was the 2008–09 Hockey East Player of the Year, a Hockey East all-star, an NCAA All-American, and a finalist for the Hobey Baker Award. That season, Thiessen set school records for wins (25), goals against average (2.12), save percentage (.931), saves (1,195), games (41) and minutes played (2,495:44). He led the NCAA in saves, was third in minutes played, and fourth in save percentage. He also became Northeastern's all-time top goaltender in goals against average (2.40), save percentage (.922) and shutouts (9).

=== Professional ===
After his third year at Northeastern, rather than play his senior season, Thiessen signed as an undrafted free agent with the Pittsburgh Penguins and joined the organization's American Hockey League affiliate in Wilkes-Barre/Scranton, though appeared in no games that season. After the Wilkes-Barre/Scranton Penguins season ended, Thiessen was among a number of players who participated with the Pittsburgh Penguins in practice during the Stanley Cup playoffs. Though he never dressed for a game, Thiessen was with the team when they defeated the Detroit Red Wings in game seven to win the Stanley Cup. He was included on the team picture, and awarded a Stanley Cup ring before playing his first pro game.

Thiessen split time during the 2009–10 season with the Wilkes-Barre/Scranton Penguins and their ECHL affiliate Wheeling Nailers. In 30 regular season appearances with the Penguins, Thiessen earned a 14–14–1 record, while he was 8–3–0 with Wheeling.

During the 2010–11 season, Thiessen was named as the Eastern Conference's starting goaltender for the 2011 AHL All-Star Classic. At the time of the All-Star break, Thiessen led the AHL with 17 wins. He became the second Penguin to be named to the All-Star team after Dany Sabourin in 2006. On his 25th birthday, he became the third Penguins goaltender to record 30 wins in a single season, joining Dany Sabourin (2005–06) and John Curry (2007–08).

On March 24, 2011, Thiessen was recalled by the Pittsburgh Penguins due to an injury to backup goalie Brent Johnson, but did not play in an NHL game.

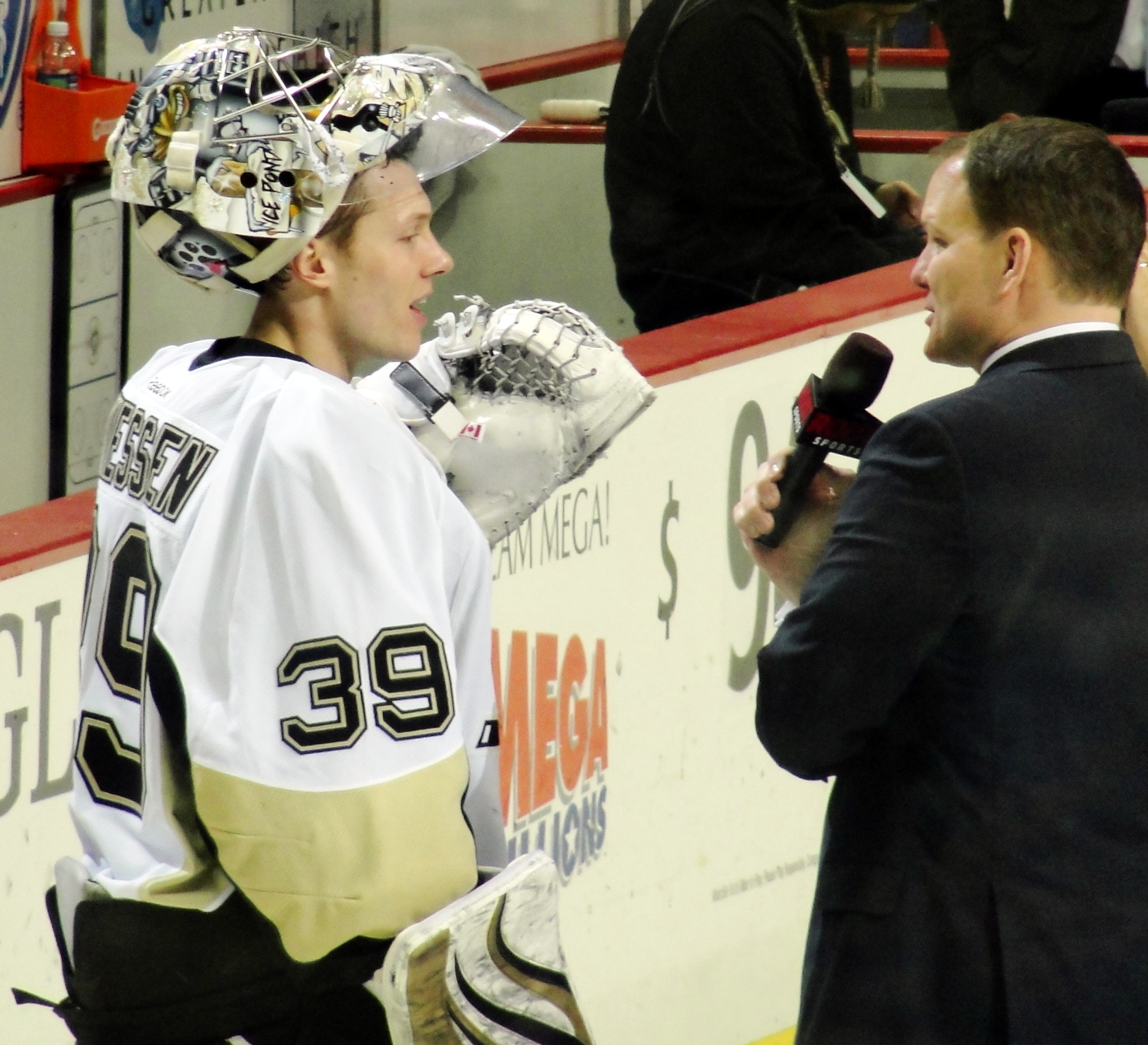
Thiessen is interviewed following his first career NHL win.

On February 24, 2012, Thiessen was recalled by the Penguins again and on February 26 he played in his first NHL game, registering his first career NHL win, 4–2 against the Columbus Blue Jackets.

On March 7, 2012, Thiessen recorded his second career win in just as many starts. The Penguins overcame a 2–0 deficit to beat the Toronto Maple Leafs 3–2.

On July 15, 2013, Thiessen opted to leave North America and signed his first European contract with HIFK of the Finnish Liiga. After only 8 games, Thiessen opted to end his HIFK career and was mutually released on November 19, 2013. On November 28, 2013, he signed a contract with the Norfolk Admirals of the AHL for the remainder of the season.

On July 3, 2014, Thiessen was signed as a free agent to a one-year, two-way contract with the Calgary Flames. At the tail end of the season, on April 5, 2015, Thiessen was called up by the Calgary from the Adirondack Flames and served as backup without making his debut for the club.

As a free agent at the conclusion of his contract with the Flames, Thiessen went un-signed over the summer before accepting a professional try-out contract to attend the Columbus Blue Jackets training camp on September 16, 2015. On September 23, he was reassigned by the Blue Jackets to attend AHL affiliate, the Lake Erie Monsters, training camp. He was later signed by the Monsters to a two-way AHL/ECHL contract and was assigned to affiliate, the Cincinnati Cyclones.

He announced his retirement on June 3, 2021, after finishing his sixth season within the Cleveland Monsters organization.

== Career statistics ==
			Regular season									Playoffs
Season	Team	League	GP	W	L	T/OT	MIN	GA	SO	GAA	SV%	GP	W	L	MIN	GA	SO	GAA	SV%
2003–04	Penticton Panthers	BCHL	42	13	17	1	2131	122	2	3.44	.897	—	—	—	—	—	—	—	—
2004–05	Penticton Vees	BCHL	26	7	18	1	1492	86	1	3.46	.901	—	—	—	—	—	—	—	—
2004–05	Prince George Spruce Kings	BCHL	10	5	4	0	561	31	0	3.31	.912	3	1	1	158	9	0	3.42	.922
2005–06	Prince George Spruce Kings	BCHL	36	14	17	4	2058	99	5	2.89	.925	—	—	—	—	—	—	—	—
2005–06	Merritt Centennials	BCHL	13	8	4	0	754	2	36	2.87	.914	6	3	3	261	16	1	3.68	.895
2006–07	Northeastern University	HE	33	11	17	5	1985	82	4	2.48	.921	—	—	—	—	—	—	—	—
2007–08	Northeastern University	HE	37	16	17	3	2180	96	2	2.64	.914	—	—	—	—	—	—	—	—
2008–09	Northeastern University	HE	41	25	12	4	2496	88	3	2.12	.931	—	—	—	—	—	—	—	—
2009–10	Wilkes-Barre/Scranton Penguins	AHL	30	14	14	1	1763	72	4	2.45	.914	1	0	1	59	4	0	4.04	.895
2009–10	Wheeling Nailers	ECHL	12	8	3	0	674	30	1	2.67	.919	—	—	—	—	—	—	—	—
2010–11	Wilkes-Barre/Scranton Penguins	AHL	46	35	8	1	2567	83	7	1.94	.922	12	6	6	720	20	2	1.67	.940
2011–12	Wilkes-Barre/Scranton Penguins	AHL	41	23	15	2	2321	109	2	2.82	.887	12	6	6	756	27	0	2.14	.908
2011–12	Pittsburgh Penguins	NHL	5	3	1	0	258	16	0	3.72	.858	—	—	—	—	—	—	—	—
2012–13	Wilkes-Barre/Scranton Penguins	AHL	32	16	12	2	1792	80	4	2.68	.902	12	6	4	654	15	2	1.38	.952
2013–14	HIFK	Liiga	8	—	—	—	—	—	—	3.06	.883	—	—	—	—	—	—	—	—
2013–14	Norfolk Admirals	AHL	18	8	6	2	984	37	1	2.26	.930	4	1	3	252	16	0	3.81	.881
2014–15	Adirondack Flames	AHL	34	10	16	7	1908	99	2	3.11	.902	—	—	—	—	—	—	—	—
2015–16	Cincinnati Cyclones	ECHL	19	10	4	4	1113	35	1	1.89	.934	7	3	4	454	19	0	2.51	.926
2015–16	Lake Erie Monsters	AHL	22	12	4	4	1231	40	3	1.95	.929	—	—	—	—	—	—	—	—
2016–17	Cleveland Monsters	AHL	12	5	6	1	666	26	3	2.34	.924	—	—	—	—	—	—	—	—
2016–17	Cincinnati Cyclones	ECHL	2	0	0	2	125	8	0	3.83	.840	—	—	—	—	—	—	—	—
2017–18	Cleveland Monsters	AHL	9	4	2	3	524	25	0	2.86	.884	—	—	—	—	—	—	—	—
2018–19	Cleveland Monsters	AHL	26	12	8	4	1401	55	2	2.36	.913	8	3	5	467	20	1	2.57	.902
2019–20	Cleveland Monsters	AHL	8	3	4	0	438	23	0	3.15	.881	—	—	—	—	—	—	—	—
2020–21	Cleveland Monsters	AHL	12	4	5	3	724	33	0	2.74	.901	—	—	—	—	—	—	—	—
NHL totals			5	3	1	0	258	16	0	3.72	.858	—	—	—	—	—	—	—	—

== Awards and honours ==
Award	Year	Ref
College
All-Hockey East Rookie Team	2006–07	
All-Hockey East First Team	2008–09	
AHCA East First-Team All-American	2008–09	
Hockey East Player of the Year	2008–09	
Hobey Baker Award Finalist	2008–09	
AHL
First All-Star Team	2010–11	
Aldege "Baz" Bastien Memorial Award	2010–11	
Harry "Hap" Holmes Memorial Award	2010–11, 2012–13	

Awards and achievements
Preceded by Kevin Regan	Hockey East Player of the Year; 2008–09	Succeeded by Bobby Butler
Preceded by Bryan Ewing	Hockey East Three-Stars Award; 2008–09	Succeeded by Bobby Butler
Preceded by Kevin Regan	Hockey East Goaltending Champion; 2008–09	Succeeded by Carter Hutton
Preceded by Jonathan Bernier	Aldege "Baz" Bastien Memorial Award; 2010–11	Succeeded by Michael Leighton
