= Dave Coleman (baseball coach) =

American baseball coach

John D. Coleman (born 1943) is a member of the Northeastern University athletics Hall of Fame. Coleman was inducted in 1981 for excellence in baseball. Coleman is also well known for his 37 years as the head baseball coach at Boston Latin.

Coleman was a defensive specialist as a catcher for the Northeastern Huskies as well as being a respected hitter. Coleman helped to lead the Huskies to the NCAA District I playoffs versus Maine at Fenway Park.

The Baltimore Orioles drafted Coleman in the first college draft in 1965. Coleman advanced to the Triple A with the Rochester Red Wings but never was able to crack the majors.

After retiring Coleman headed to Boston Latin where he coached both baseball and hockey at the high school. During the 37 seasons for which he was coach, Coleman became one of the most victorious coaches in state history.
