= List of Northeastern University people =

The following is a list of notable alumni and faculty of Northeastern University.

== Alumni ==
=== Business ===
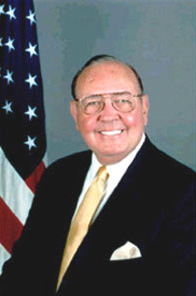
Richard Egan

- Nikesh Arora – chairman and chief executive officer of Palo Alto Networks
- Jeff Bornstein – CFO, General Electric
- Robert A. Brooks – founder and CEO, Brooks Fiber Properties
- George Chamillard – former CEO, Teradyne, Inc.
- Jeff Clarke – former CEO of Kodak
- Jeff Cooper – COO and co-founder, EPOX-Z Corporation
- Bob Davis – CEO and founder, Lycos
- Richard Egan – co-founder, EMC
- Shawn Fanning – founder, Napster
- Jerald G. Fishman – CEO, Analog Devices
- Roland Fomundam – agricultural entrepreneur, CEO of MoonLight Mining and Restoration Company
- George Kariotis – founder, Alpha Industries
- Amin Khoury – founder and CEO, B/E Aerospace
- Andrew Left – activist short seller
- Roger Marino – co-founder of EMC; former part-owner of Pittsburgh Penguins
- Alan McKim – CEO and founder, Clean Harbors
- Larry Meyer – CEO, Uniqlo USA
- Srinath Narayanan – principal, Canaccord Adams
- Marc Raibert – founder and CEO, Boston Dynamics
- Jeffrey Rosen – billionaire businessman
- Peter W. Smith – investment banker, Republican activist
- Sy Sternberg – chairman and former CEO, New York Life Insurance Company
- Biz Stone – co-founder of Twitter

=== Government and politics ===
- Jayson P. Ahern – deputy commissioner of U.S. Customs and Border Protection
- Olubanke King Akerele – Liberian foreign minister
- George F. Archambault – pharmacy liaison officer for the United States Public Health Service
- Demetrius J. Atsalis – member of the Massachusetts House of Representatives (1999–2013)
- Thomas Calter – member of the Massachusetts House of Representatives (2007–2018)
- Christie Carpino – member of the Connecticut House of Representatives
- David Chu – member of the Legislative Council of Hong Kong (1997–2004) and the 9th and 10th National People's Congress of the People's Republic of China
- Cheryl A. Coakley-Rivera – member of the Massachusetts House of Representatives (1999–2014)
- Mo Cowan – U.S. senator of Massachusetts
- Robert DeLeo – former speaker of the Massachusetts House of Representatives (2009–2020)
- Harold Daniel Donohue – member of the U.S. House of Representatives (1947–1974)
- Patrick Duddy – U.S. ambassador
- Richard Egan – U.S. ambassador
- David Ferriero – 10th archivist of the United States
- Thomas Finneran – former speaker of the Massachusetts House of Representatives (1996–2004)
- Zandra Flemister – first African-American woman to serve as a U.S. Secret Service agent
- Gordon D. Fox – majority leader of the Rhode Island House of Representatives (2010–2014)
- Peter Franchot – comptroller of Maryland
- Maggie Hassan – governor of New Hampshire (2013–2017) and the current junior United States senator from New Hampshire
- Maura Healey – governor of Massachusetts (2023–present) and Massachusetts attorney general (2015–2023)
- Russell Holmes – member of the Massachusetts House of Representatives (2011–present)
- Roderick L. Ireland – Massachusetts Supreme Judicial Court chief justice
- Edward Jackamonis – speaker of the Wisconsin State Assembly
- James Franklin Jeffrey – U.S. ambassador
- Lyndon LaRouche – perennial presidential candidate
- Hadassah Lieberman – wife of Connecticut Senator Joseph Lieberman
- Ron Mariano – speaker of the Massachusetts House of Representatives
- Adnan Aurangzeb Miangul – former Pakistani parliament member and prince of Swat, Pakistan
- Paul Parks – Massachusetts secretary of education (1975–1979)
- John O. Pastore – governor of Rhode Island
- Ari Porth – member of the Florida House of Representatives
- Larry Ross – member of the New Hampshire House of Representatives
- Theodore Speliotis – member of the Massachusetts House of Representatives
- Karen Spilka – member of the Massachusetts State Senate
- Wallace Stickney – director of the Federal Emergency Management Agency under President George H. W. Bush
- Thomas Winkowski – former acting commissioner of U.S. Customs and Border Protection (CBP); former principal deputy assistant secretary for U.S. Immigration and Customs Enforcement (ICE)
- Leslie Winner – North Carolina state senator
- Maynard L. Young Jr. – member of the New Hampshire House of Representatives

=== Judiciary ===
- Margot Botsford – justice, Massachusetts Supreme Judicial Court
- Linda Dalianis – justice, New Hampshire Supreme Court
- Dana Fabe – chief justice, Alaska Supreme Court
- Edward Hennessey – justice, Massachusetts Supreme Judicial Court
- Landya B. McCafferty – chief judge, United States District Court for the District of New Hampshire
- Victoria A. Roberts – senior judge, United States District Court for the Eastern District of Michigan
- Peter T. Zarella – justice, Connecticut Supreme Court

=== Science and technology ===
- Hans Baumann – inventor and engineer
- Hans R. Camenzind – inventor of the 555 timer IC
- Richard P. Gabriel – expert on the Lisp programming language
- Jerome F. Hajjar – civil engineer
- Gregory Jarvis – astronaut
- Eugene F. Lally – aerospace engineer, photographer, entrepreneur
- Yale Patt – engineer
- Albert Sacco – astronaut

=== Military ===
- Mark P. Fitzgerald – United States Navy admiral
- Richard I. Neal – United States Marine Corps general

=== Journalism and communications ===
- Ernie Anastos – New York City TV news anchorman
- Eddie Andelman – sports radio talk show host (MBA)
- Bill Barnwell – sportswriter, ESPN, Grantland
- Michelle Bonner – ESPN/CNN/FOX Sports anchor, reporter
- Fred Cusick – sportscaster
- Richard Daniels – former president, Boston Globe
- Nat Hentoff – contributing editor, The New Yorker Magazine
- Will McDonough – sportswriter, Boston Globe
- Don Orsillo – TV broadcaster
- Walter V. Robinson – investigative journalist, 2003 Pulitzer Prize for Public Service recipient
- Michael Slackman – international managing editor, The New York Times
- Molly White – technology writer and Wikipedia editor

=== Arts and entertainment ===
Toby Fox

- Al Barile – singer, guitarist for hardcore punk band SS Decontrol
- Earle Brown – composer, developed open-form scores
- Joy Browne – radio talk show host
- Jose F. Buscaglia – philosopher, historian, social scientist
- Terry Carter – actor, Sgt. Joe Broadhurst in McCloud and Colonel Tigh in the original Battlestar Galactica
- Carla Cook – Grammy-nominated jazz vocalist
- Jane Curtin – actress, comedian, and founding member of Saturday Night Live
- Michael J. Epstein – filmmaker and musician
- Martín Espada – poet
- Damien Fahey – former host of the MTV program TRL
- Toby Fox – game developer and composer, creator of Undertale and Deltarune
- Alex Garcia – Food Network chef
- Meredith Garniss – visual artist and landscape painter
- Sidney Gish – singer/songwriter
- Elliot Grainge – CEO of Atlantic Records
- Alan Catello Grazioso (B.S. '92) – Daytime Emmy Awards–nominated television producer, podcast executive producer and host, and 2× Webby Awards-nominated online content creator
- Mohammed Saeed Harib – creator of Freej
- Courtney Hunt – writer and director, whose film Frozen River was nominated for an Academy Award
- Plane Jane – drag queen and contestant on RuPaul's Drag Race season 16
- Beverly Johnson – supermodel and actress
- Aisha Kahlil – dancer, singer
- Barbara Kopple – documentary filmmaker
- Diana Lemieux – freelance photographer
- Patrice O'Neal – comedian and actor
- Peter Orner – fiction writer
- Jillian Wheeler – singer/songwriter
- Wendy Williams – radio and television, host of The Wendy Williams Show

=== Academia and nonprofit ===
- William M. Fowler – author, professor, and former director of the Massachusetts Historical Society
- Michael R. Lane – 15th president of Emporia State University
- Beulah Providence – non-profit founder
- Yuliya Snihur – professor and researcher at IESE Business School
- Dean Tong – author and consultant
- Michael L. Tushman – organizational theorist, professor at Harvard Business School
- Elizabeth Yeampierre – attorney and environmental activist

=== Sports ===
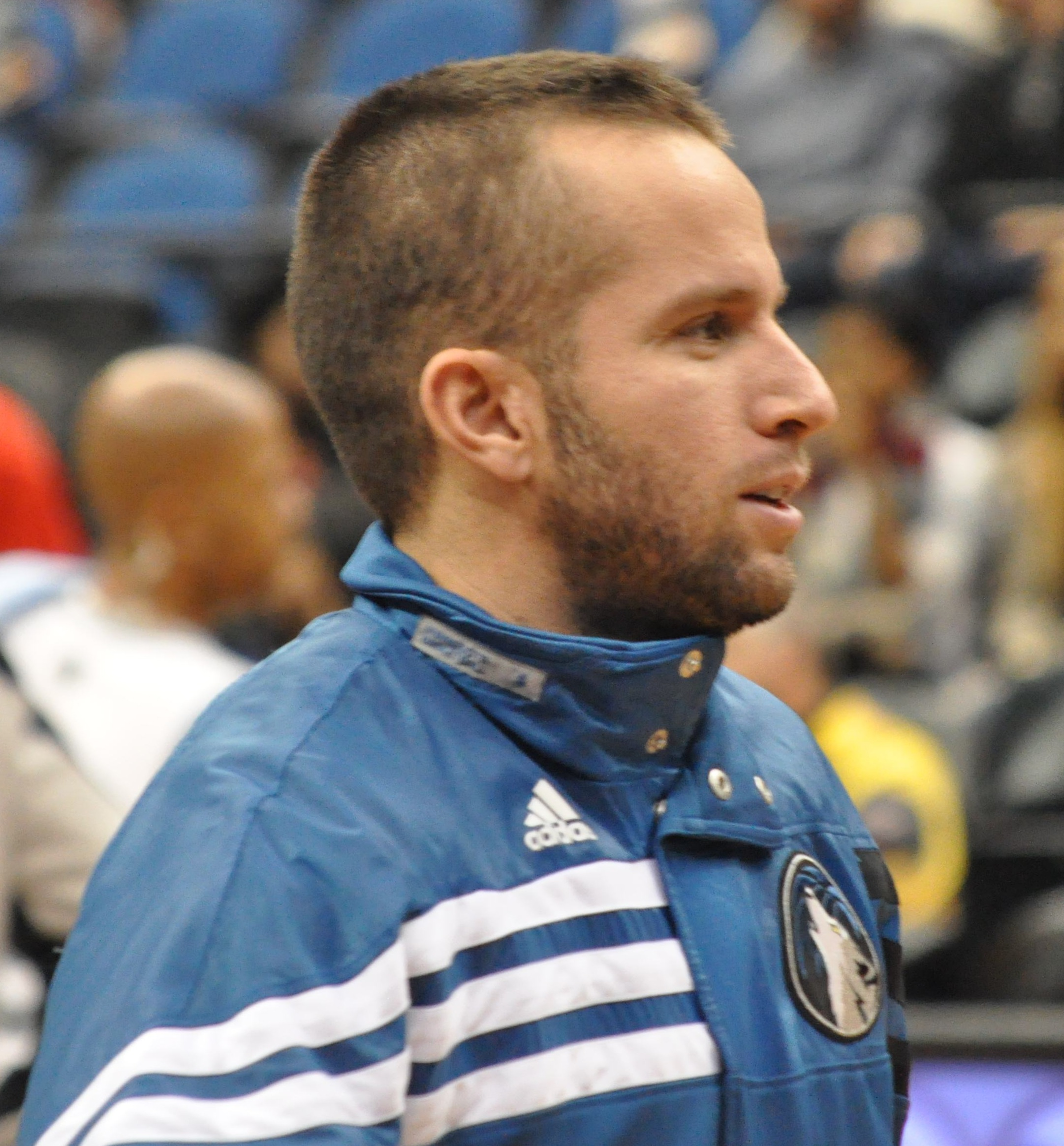
José Juan Barea

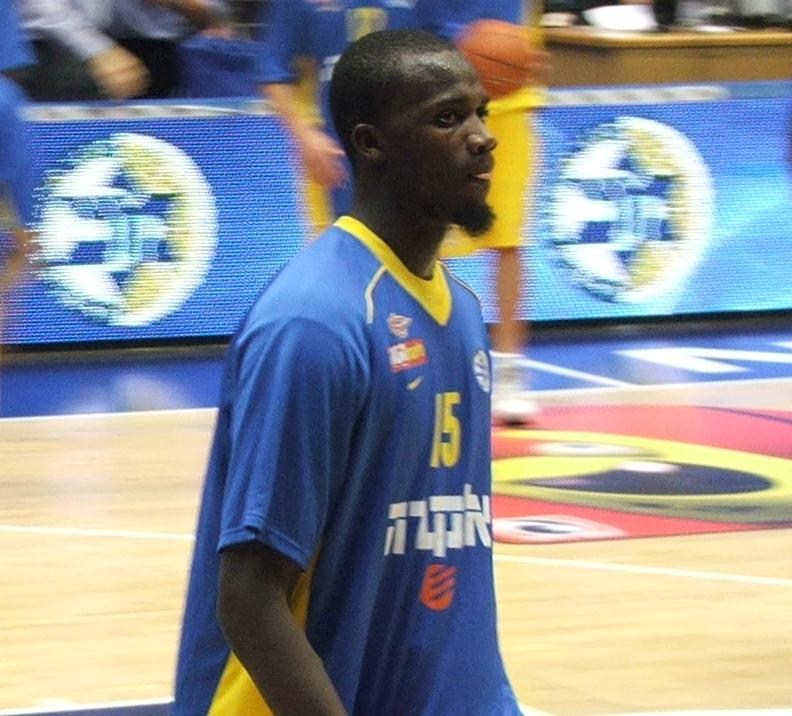
Shawn James

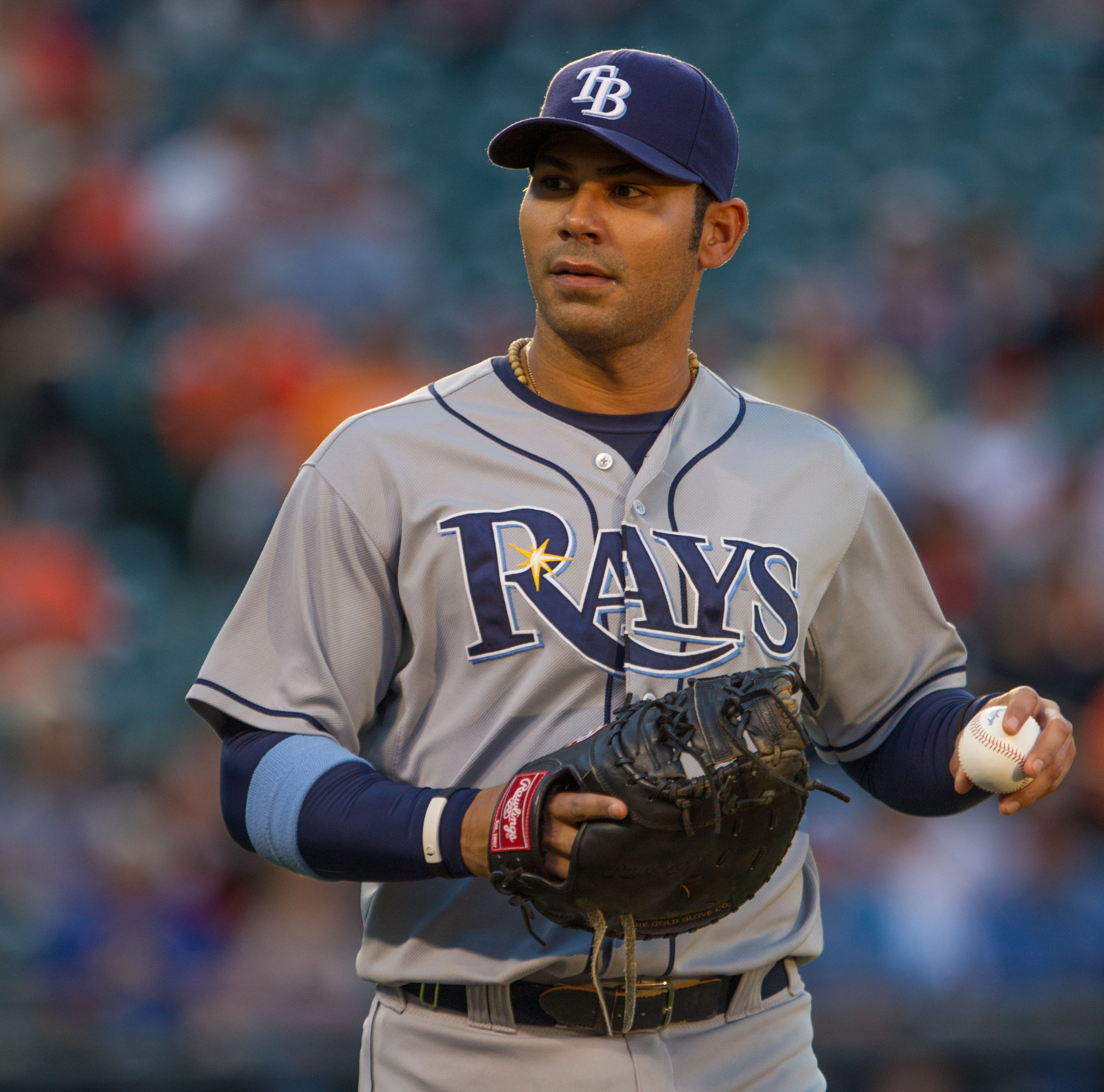
Carlos Peña

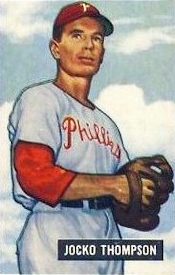
Jocko Thompson

- Kariman Abuljadayel – Saudi Arabian Olympian (Athletics, 100 m, Rio 2016)
- Peyton Anderson - PWHL, Minnesota Frost
- Zachary Aston-Reese – NHL, Pittsburgh Penguins
- Chloe Aurard - PWHL, New York Sirens, Boston Fleet
- José Juan Barea – Dallas Mavericks, NBA
- Harry Barnes – San Diego Rockets, NBA
- Ed Barry – Boston Bruins, National Hockey League (NHL)
- Sandy Beadle – Winnipeg Jets, NHL
- Bruce Bickford – gold medal-winning distance runner
- Randy Bucyk – Montreal Canadiens, Calgary Flames, NHL
- Joe Callahan – Boston Bees, MLB
- Bob Cappadona – former NFL running back
- Megan Carter - PWHL, Toronto Scepters, Seattle Torrent, Vegas Vanguards
- Lynn Chiavaro – basketball player and coach
- Art Chisholm – Boston Bruins, NHL
- Rob Cowie – Los Angeles Kings, NHL
- Kendall Coyne Schofield - PWHL, Minnesota Frost, two-time USA Olympic gold-medalist
- Jerome Daniels – Miami Dolphins, Baltimore Ravens, Arizona Cardinals
- Jim Fahey – NHL defenseman, New Jersey Devils
- Amber Ferreira – professional triathlete
- Aerin Frankel - PWHL, Boston Fleet, USA Olympic gold-medalist
- Tony Fryklund – professional mixed martial arts fighter
- Adam Gaudette – Hobey Baker Award recipient, NHL center, Vancouver Canucks
- Chelsey Goldberg – ice hockey player, Boston Blades, CWHL
- Scott Gruhl – Pittsburgh Penguins, NHL
- Jordan Harris (born 2000) – Montreal Canadiens, NHL
- Brooke Hobson - PWHL, Ottawa Charge
- "Wild" Bill Hunnefield – Major League Baseball (MLB)
- Skylar Irving - PWHL, Montreal Victoire
- Shawn James – professional basketball player for Maccabi Tel Aviv
- Sean Jones – National Football League
- Reema Juffali – Saudi Arabian racing driver
- Saja Kamal – Saudi Arabian footballer
- Katy Knoll - PWHL, Minnesota Frost, Vegas Vanguards
- Denisa Krizova - PWHL, Minnesota Frost, Vancouver Goldeneyes, New York Sirens, Czech Olympian
- Steven Langton – Olympian (bobsled)
- Dave Leitao – college basketball coach
- Sarah Levy (born 1995) – Olympic bronze medalist, rugby union and rugby sevens player
- Reggie Lewis – Boston Celtics
- Madison Mailey – Olympic gold medalist (rowing)
- Pat Mason – college baseball coach at Virginia Tech
- Dan McGillis – NHL defenseman
- Perry Moss – 1986 Washington Bullets, Philadelphia 76ers, 1987 Golden State Warriors
- Alina Muller - PWHL, Boston Fleet, Hamilton Havoc, two-time Swiss Olympic bronze-medalist
- Maureen Murphy - PWHL, Montreal Victoire, Vegas Vanguards
- Chris Nilan – Montreal Canadiens, Boston Bruins, New York Rangers
- Jamie Oleksiak – NHL, Dallas Stars
- Adam Ottavino – 1st-round pick in 2006 MLB draft, pitcher for St. Louis Cardinals (2010), Colorado Rockies (2012–2018), New York Yankees (2019–2020) Boston Red Sox (2021–present)
- Carlos Peña – MLB first baseman/outfielder, Oakland Athletics, Detroit Tigers, Boston Red Sox, Tampa Bay Rays
- Gwyneth Phillips - PWHL, Ottawa Charge, USA Olympic gold-medalist
- David Poile – NHL executive
- Bruce Racine – NHL goaltender, St. Louis Blues
- Dan Ross – NFL Cincinnati Bengals and Super Bowl record setter
- Michael Ryan – NHL left winger, Buffalo Sabres
- Hayley Scamurra - PWHL, Ottawa Charge, Toronto Sceptres, Montreal Victoire, Vegas Vanguards, USA Olympic gold-medalist
- Florence Schelling – goaltender for the Switzerland's women's ice hockey team
- Cam Schlittler – MLB pitcher, New York Yankees (2025–present)
- Dylan Sikura – NHL center, Chicago Blackhawks
- Brian Sullivan – NHL, 1992–93 New Jersey Devils
- Harry Swartz (born 1996) – soccer player
- Josh Heinrich Taves – NFL football player, 2000–02, Oakland Raiders and Carolina Panthers
- Brad Thiessen – NHL, Pittsburgh Penguins
- Jocko Thompson – MLB pitcher, 1948–51 Philadelphia Phillies
- Johnny Tobin – MLB, 1932 New York Giants
- Shaun Tomson (born 1955) – South African world champion surfer
- Joe Vitale – NHL, center for Pittsburgh Penguins
- Jason Vosler (born 1993) – baseball third baseman for the San Francisco Giants
- Ashley Wagner (born 1991) – figure skater
- Kurt Walker – NHL, 1975–78 Toronto Maple Leafs
- Jim Walsh – Buffalo Sabres, NHL
- Rick Weitzman – 1968, World Champion, Boston Celtics
- Keith Willis – NFL, Pittsburgh Steelers
- Hillary Witt – assistant coach for the United States women's national ice hockey team in the Sochi 2014 Olympics
- George Yankowski – MLB, 1942 Philadelphia Athletics, 1949 Chicago White Sox

== Faculty ==
- Belle Adler – associate professor of journalism
- M. Shahid Alam
- Daniel P. Aldrich – expert on social capital and resilience in disaster
- Prince Charles Alexander – Grammy Award-winning record producer
- Albert-László Barabási – American Physical Society fellow, member of the Academia Europaea and contributor to the development of real-world network theory
- Lisa Feldman Barrett – Distinguished Professor of Psychology, fellow of AAAS
- Barry Bluestone – founding director of the Kitty and Michael Dukakis Center for Urban and Regional Policy
- Ed Bullins – playwright and Guggenheim fellow
- Joe Castiglione – MLB radio announcer
- Rose Laub Coser – sociologist; vice-president of the American Sociological Association; president of the Eastern Sociological Society
- Tim Cresswell – human geographer and poet
- William F. Crittenden – professor emeritus at the D'Amore-McKim School of Business
- Nicholas Daniloff – correspondent for UPI and U.S. News & World Report
- Richard Deth – voice in the autism and vaccine controversy
- Anthony Devaney – electrical engineer
- Hugh Dubberly – designer and design theorist
- Michael Dukakis – former Massachusetts state governor and 1988 Democratic presidential candidate
- Matthias Felleisen – author of How to Design Programs
- Melissa Ferrick – singer/songwriter; plaintiff of industry-altering $43 million class action lawsuit Ferrick v. Spotify
- William M. Fowler – historian, former director of the Massachusetts Historical Society
- James Alan Fox – authority on serial killers and hate crimes
- Auroop Ratan Ganguly – water & climate science, data & network science, and infrastructure resilience
- Alexander Gorlov – ASME Thomas A. Edison Award winner; inventor of the Gorlov helical turbine
- Gary Goshgarian – author, uses the pen name Gary Braver
- Nat Hentoff – Guggenheim fellow, Fulbright fellow
- M. Whitney Kelting
- Harlan Lane – MacArthur Foundation Genius Award winner
- Jack Levin – authority on serial killers and hate crimes
- Karl Lieberherr – computer scientist
- Peter K. Manning – authority on the occupational culture of policing
- Pran Nath – co-developer of the theory of supergravity
- Robert B. Parker – author of the "Spenser" novels
- Rupal Patel – speech scientist and founder of VOCALiD
- Justin B. Ries – marine scientist and inventor
- Walter V. Robinson – Pulitzer-winning journalist
- Nada Sanders – Distinguished Professor of Supply Chain Management at the D’Amore-McKim School of Business
- Mikhail Shubin – member of the Russian Academy of Sciences and mathematician
- Justine Siegal – baseball coach and sports educator
- Alessandro Vespignani – American Physical Society fellow, member of the Academia Europaea
- Mitchell Wand – author of Essentials of Programming Languages
