= CashU =

Digital wallet company serving Middle East and North Africa

- Company type: Private company
- Industry: Financial services
- Founded: 2002; 24 years ago in Amman, Jordan
- Founders: Maktoob
- Defunct: 2022
- Fate: Defunct
- Headquarters: Dubai, United Arab Emirates
- Area served: Middle East and North Africa (MENA)

CashU was an Arabic fintech company providing a digital wallet and online payment services for customers in the Middle East and North Africa (MENA) region. The company was founded as a technology startup in July 2002 in association with online service company Maktoob in Amman, Jordan. It provided payment services for Maktoob online services. The company went through a number of rounds of investment from venture capital funds.

Prior to its demise, the company had over 3.2 million users and was headquartered in Dubai and had offices in Jordan and Egypt. It was legally registered in the British Virgin Islands (BVI) for some years until its registration was moved to Dubai.

== History ==
=== Early years ===
In 2002, CashU was launched as an alternative online payment method for the use of credit cards.

The business grew quickly over the next few years with CashU providing payment services to its sister companies, online service company Maktoob and online commerce platform souq.com.

On August 25, 2009, Yahoo! acquired its sister company Maktoob in a deal that exceeded $85 million. According to the agreement between the two companies, the deal did not include the rest of Maktoob’s products, including Cashu, Souq.com, Araby and Tahadi MMO games, which became part of Jabbar Internet Group headed by Maktoob, lately Tiger Management as it was major shareholder.

=== Souq Group subsidiary (2012–2015) ===
In 2012, Naspers Limited took a stake alongside Jabbar Internet Group and Tiger Global in CashU and Souq.com, and so it was listed under the umbrella of Souq Group, which included Souq.com, Sukar.com and Qexpress (a logistics and shipping company), as well as CashU.

While Souq Group continued to focus on the e-commerce, CashU was growing towards cashless societies and servicing the underbanked and started to move away from the vision of Souq, especially as the regulations and compliance for Electronic payment systems and e-wallets in particular were still in development in the region. In 2012, this resulted in CashU leaving the Souq Group.

Later in 2013, CashU launched a new online payment gateway, Payfort.

=== Management buyout (2015) ===
In December 2015, CashU Management purchased the company in the first management buyout deal in the Middle East.

After the management buyout was completed in 2016, CashU migrated its business to Singapore and got approved to operate as a stored-value card facility by the Monetary Authority of Singapore (MAS). All CashU's merchants, vendors, and consumers were then required to maintain a full KYC (Know Your Customer) record that complied with MAS’ rules and regulations, which was a major step towards regulating the core business of CashU.

This caused an immediate loss of business and irritation to the authorities of Saudi Arabia, who didn’t feel comfortable sharing its citizen ID’s with a non-regulated entity. Accordingly, the Saudi Arabian Monetary Authority blocked CashU's website in Saudi Arabia on January 28, 2016.

=== UAE and return to Saudi Arabia (2016-2017) ===
On October 1, 2016, CASHU partnered with Mastercard and Noor Bank in the United Arab Emirates to launch the first prepaid virtual credit card in the region, which was approved by the Central Bank of the UAE. This product gave CashU legal approval to operate in the United Arab Emirates as a FinTech company in cooperation with Noor Bank.

Later in October 2016, Al Bilad Bank in Saudi Arabia announced that it has entered into a strategic partnership with CashU to develop innovative payment products and services in Saudi Arabia. The partnership with Al Bilad Bank allowed CashU to recommence its operations in Saudi Arabia. In October 2017, CashU and Al Bilad Bank completed the compliance requirements of the Saudi Arabian Monetary Authority and received its approval to operate in Saudi Arabia again.
