= Ronaldo Mouchawar =

Syrian entrepreneur

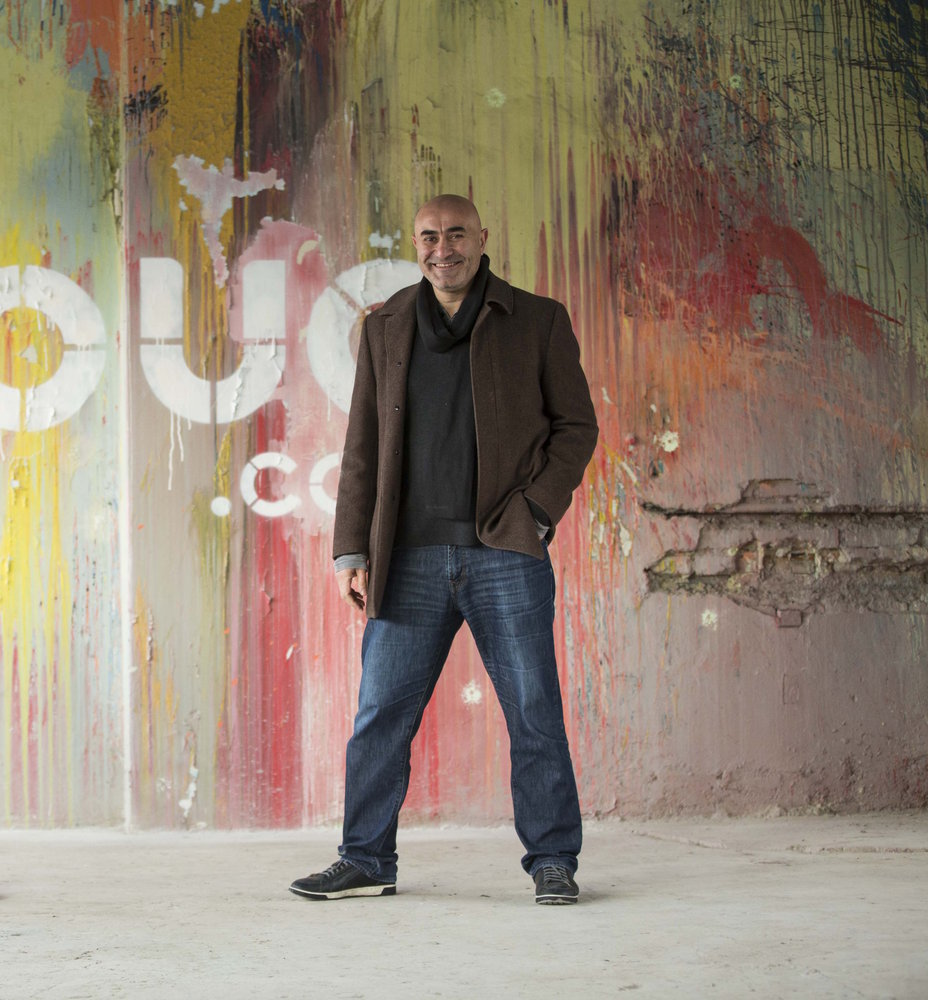
- Born: Aleppo, Syria
- Education: bachelor's degree in Electrical and Computer Engineering and master's degree in Digital Communication
- Alma mater: Northeastern University
- Occupation: VP of Amazon MENA
- Known for: Souq.com

Ronaldo Mouchawar (Arabic: رونالدو مشحور), is a Syrian entrepreneur. In 2005, he co-founded Souq.com, the largest e-commerce retailer in the Arab World, making the e-commerce retailer the region's first unicorn. When Amazon acquired Souq in 2017, Mouchewar became vice president of Amazon Middle East and North Africa. He is a veteran of Maktoob, the internet portal that was purchased by Yahoo in 2009.

== Early life and education ==
Ronaldo Mouchawar was born in Aleppo, in Syria. His father was a merchant, and this provided the inspiration for the name of the e-commerce site. Mouchawar is also a former basketball player of the Jalaa SC Aleppo.

Mouchawar holds a master's degree in digital communications and a bachelor's degree in electrical and computer engineering from Northeastern University in Boston, Massachusetts, in the United States. He spent the early years of his career with the Boston engineering firm working in technology and business management, including a role as a technical and systems consultant at Electronic Data Systems (EDS).

== Career ==
Mouchawar co-founded Souq.com in 2005 alongside Jabbar, Internet Group's Samih Toukan, and Hussam Khoury. He added products from fashion to electronics and homeware and the site became the largest e-commerce retailer in the Arab world.

=== 'White Friday' ===
In 2014, he established the White Friday sales event to coincide with Black Friday in the US, explaining that a "black" Friday didn't make cultural sense in the Arab world, since Friday is the traditional day of prayer. The sale was widely popular as it raised over $275 million. In 2015 Souq.com more than doubled its sales during its second White Friday sale, with 13 million visitors and 600,000 items sold between 25 and 28 November across the UAE, Saudi Arabia, Kuwait and Egypt. Additionally it was involved in the exclusive release of the Huawei Honor 6 launch in Abu Dhabi.

=== Funding and Amazon acquisition ===
In February 2016, Souq.com announced it had received $275m of funding, with a valuation above $1bn, the Arab world's largest ever funding deal. In March 2017, it was made public that Amazon would be acquiring Souq.com. The sum of this deal was not initially disclosed, though an Amazon SEC filing later revealed that the total sum paid was $580m in cash. Today Mouchawar serves as VP of Amazon MENA.

== Awards ==
Ronaldo Mouchawar has received several professional awards both in UAE and overseas.

- 2013: Gulf Business Industry Awards, CEO of the year in the IT/Technology category
- 2015: Entrepreneur of the Year award (Retail)

== See also ==
- List of Northeastern University people
