= Lemieux (surname) =

Origin
- Meaning: the best
- Region of origin: France

Other names
- Variant form: Lémieux

Lemieux is a French surname originating from Normandy and it has been traced from Rouen in the 1600s to earlier origins on the Cotentin peninsula. According to the website "Les familles Lemieux d'Amerique" ("The Lemieux families of America") the North American Lemieux are descended from two half-brothers, Pierre and Gabriel, who emigrated from Rouen, France, to Quebec in 1643. This surname is not to be confused with Lémieux, a name of French origin which is derived from a small town, Leymieux, in the Rhône-Alpes region of France.

It may refer to the following people:

== In sports ==
- Alain Lemieux (born 1961), Canadian ice hockey player, brother of Mario
- Bob Lemieux (1944–2025), Canadian ice hockey player and coach
- Brendan Lemieux (born 1996), American-Canadian ice hockey player, son of Claude
- Claude Lemieux (1965–2026), Canadian ice hockey player, brother of Jocelyn
- David Lemieux (boxer) (born 1988), Canadian boxer
- Delby Lemieux (born 2003), American football player
- Jacques Lemieux (born 1943), Canadian ice hockey player
- Jean Lemieux (born 1952), Canadian ice hockey player
- Jocelyn Lemieux (born 1967), Canadian ice hockey player, brother of Claude
- Lawrence Lemieux (born 1955), Canadian sailor
- Mario Lemieux (born 1965), Canadian ice hockey player
- Réal Lemieux (1945–1975), Canadian ice hockey player
- Richard Lemieux (born 1951), Canadian ice hockey player
- Shane Lemieux (born 1997), American football player

== In politics ==
- Diane Lemieux (born 1961), Canadian politician
- Francois-Xavier Lemieux (1811–1864), Québec lawyer and politician; uncle of Francois-Xavier
- François-Xavier Lemieux (Quebec MNA) (1851–1933), Québec lawyer of Louis Riel, politician, and judge; nephew of Francois-Xavier
- George LeMieux (born 1969), US Senator from Florida
- Pierre Lemieux (born 1963), Canadian politician
- Rodolphe Lemieux (1866–1937), Canadian journalist, lawyer, professor, and politician
- Ron Lemieux (born 1950), Canadian politician

== In other fields ==
- David Lemieux (born 1970), Canadian Legacy Manager and Audio Archivist for the Grateful Dead
- Diana Lemieux (born ?), American photographer
- Jean-Michel Lemieux, chief technology officer of Shopify
- Jean Paul Lemieux (1904–1990), Canadian painter
- Julie Lemieux (born 1962), Canadian voice actress and director
- Kelly LeMieux (born 1967), bass player with the band Goldfinger
- Lyse Lemieux (judge) (born 1936), Chief Justice of the Quebec Superior Court
- Marie-Nicole Lemieux (born 1975), Canadian contralto
- Raymond Lemieux (1920–2000), Canadian biochemist, discoverer of the synthesis of sucrose
- Thomas Lemieux, Canadian economist
- Victoria Lemieux (born 1963), Canadian specialist in records management and Associate Professor of Archival Studies

== See also ==
- Lemieux (disambiguation)
