= Saja =

Saja may refer to:

== People ==
- Alieu Badara Saja Taal (1944–2014), Gambian academic and politician
- Kazimieras Saja (born 1932), Lithuanian writer and politician
- Pietro Saja (1779–1833), Italian painter
- Saiful Alam Saja, Bangladeshi politician
- Şaja Batyrow (1908–1965), Soviet politician
- Saja Kamal, Saudi Arabian footballer
- Sebastián Saja (born 1979), Argentine football goalkeeper

== Places ==
- Saja Assembly constituency, Chhattisgarh, India
- Saja (river), Spain
- Saja, Tanzania

== Other uses ==
- Saja Records
- South Asian Journalists Association
