= Cristina Lopes =

Cristina Videira Lopes
- Occupation: Professor of Computer Science
- Awards: ACM Distinguished Member
- Website: www.ics.uci.edu/~lopes/

Cristina Videira Lopes is a professor of informatics and computer science at University of California, Irvine.

== Education ==
Lopes received a PhD in Computer Science from Northeastern University in 1998 under Karl Lieberherr and Gregor Kiczales.

== Career ==
Prior to being a professor, she was a research scientist at the Xerox Palo Alto Research Center (PARC). While at PARC, she was most known as a founder of the group that developed Aspect-Oriented Programming (AOP) and started aspectj.org. She later has been working in ubiquitous computing, with a focus in communication mechanisms that are pervasive, secure and intuitive for humans to perceive and interact with.

== Awards and honors ==
- 2011: ACM Distinguished Member

== Selected publications ==
- Videira Lopes, Cristina (June 2, 2014). Exercises in Programming Style (1st ed.). Chapman & Hall. ISBN 978-1482227376.
- Videira Lopes, Cristina (July 27, 2020). Exercises in Programming Style (2nd ed.). Chapman & Hall. ISBN 978-0367350208.
