= Anthony Omenya =

French-Canadian entrepreneur from the Democratic Republic of Congo

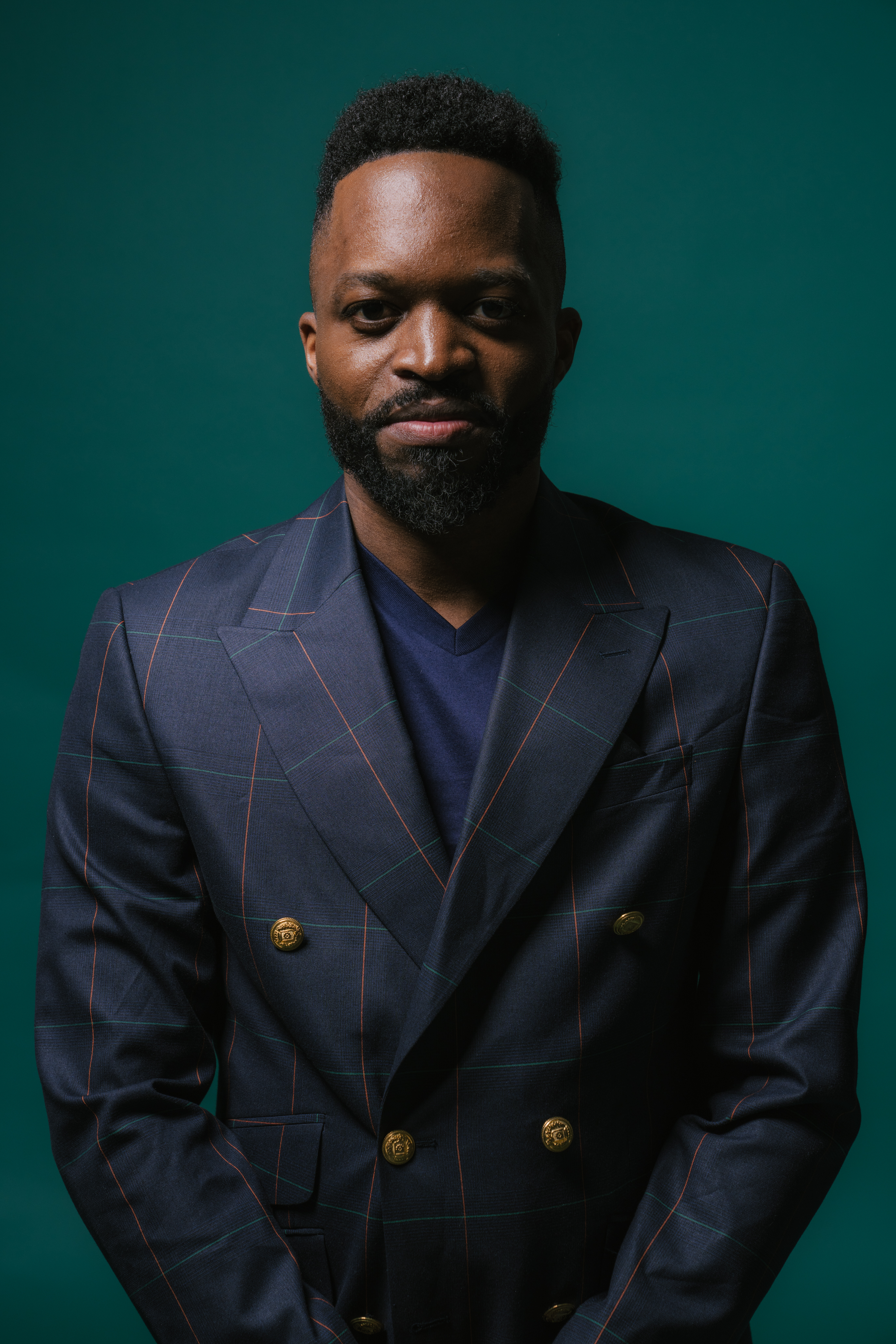
- Anthony Omenya in 2024
- Born: 1989 (age 36–37); Paris, France
- Citizenship: Congolese
- Education: University of Montréal
- Occupations: Businessman; IT developer
- Years active: 2014–present
- Organization: Omenya Group
- Notable work: Faire la différence
- Family: Omenya
- Honours: Nominated in the Top 10 of 100 of Google MTL Startup Challenge TheFounder Project; Named in the Entrepreneur of the Year category by Le Gala Dynastie
- Website: www.anthonyomenya.com

Anthony Lomanghe Omenya (born 1989) is a French-Canadian entrepreneur, investor and author originally from the Democratic Republic of the Congo. He is known for being the founder of the Moko platform specializing in the development of mobile applications and digital distribution. He is also the CEO of Omenya Group, Omenya Consulting and Omenya Space.

== Biography ==
=== Childhood and studies ===
Born in 1989 in Meaux, France, he spent most of his childhood there before moving to Montreal twenty years later to study economics at University of Montréal

=== Professional career ===
After experiencing a number of difficulties in his early business ventures, notably with his company, The Best Smart Corporation Paris in sports and music sectors, sectors, he launched his first platform INsidde, a social media platform for sports fans in Quebec.

In 2014, he co-founded the mobile app Moko with his friend André Mwana, an Afro-Caribbean and urban music platform that means "one" in Lingala and English. The full name of the platform is One Africa, symbolizing the coming together of all African nations into one culture. With the support of HEC Montréal and Groupe 3737, Moko climbed into the top 30 of Apple's most downloaded applications in just 24 hours after its launch.

In October 2026, he was named to the inaugural cohort of the Amazon Creators Foundry, a six-month program launched by Creators HQ and Amazon Ads to help UAE-based creators grow their brands on Amazon.ae

=== The Omenya concept ===
==== Omenya Consulting ====
In 2018, he launched his own firm, Omenya Consulting, which is an online academy that aims to help entrepreneurs create successful mobile applications and digital technologies.

==== Omenya Group ====
In 2020, he started Omenya Group, a holding company combining his multiple businesses and investments.

In 2021 Anthony Omenya creates Omenya Space, a rental creative space combining several services: a space for the creation of podcasts, videos and photos as well as a conference room, a coworking space, private offices and a photo studio.

==== Omenya Studios ====
It offers numerous conferences and videos on the role of CEO in today's digital world, under the guise of Omenya Studios.

== Books ==
- Anthony Omenya (2020). Faire la différence. Editions de l'Apothéose. La Doxa Editions. ISBN 978-2376380436.

== Recognition ==
- 2021: Named in the Entrepreneur of the Year category by Le Gala Dynastie
