= Northeastern University College of Engineering =

- Type: Private
- Established: 1909
- Parent institution: Northeastern University
- Dean: Jerome F. Hajjar
- Faculty: 353
- Undergraduates: 3868
- Postgraduates: 5313
- Location: Boston, Massachusetts, United States; 42°20′18.3″N 71°5′19.8″W
- Website: coe.northeastern.edu

The Northeastern University College of Engineering (COE) is the engineering school of Northeastern University in Boston, Massachusetts. It offers Bachelor of Science (BS), Master of Science (MS) and doctoral degrees, as well as graduate certificates, in a variety of engineering fields, as well as undergraduate and graduate degrees in interdisciplinary and engineering fields. It is by the accredited by the Engineering Accreditation Commission of ABET

== History ==
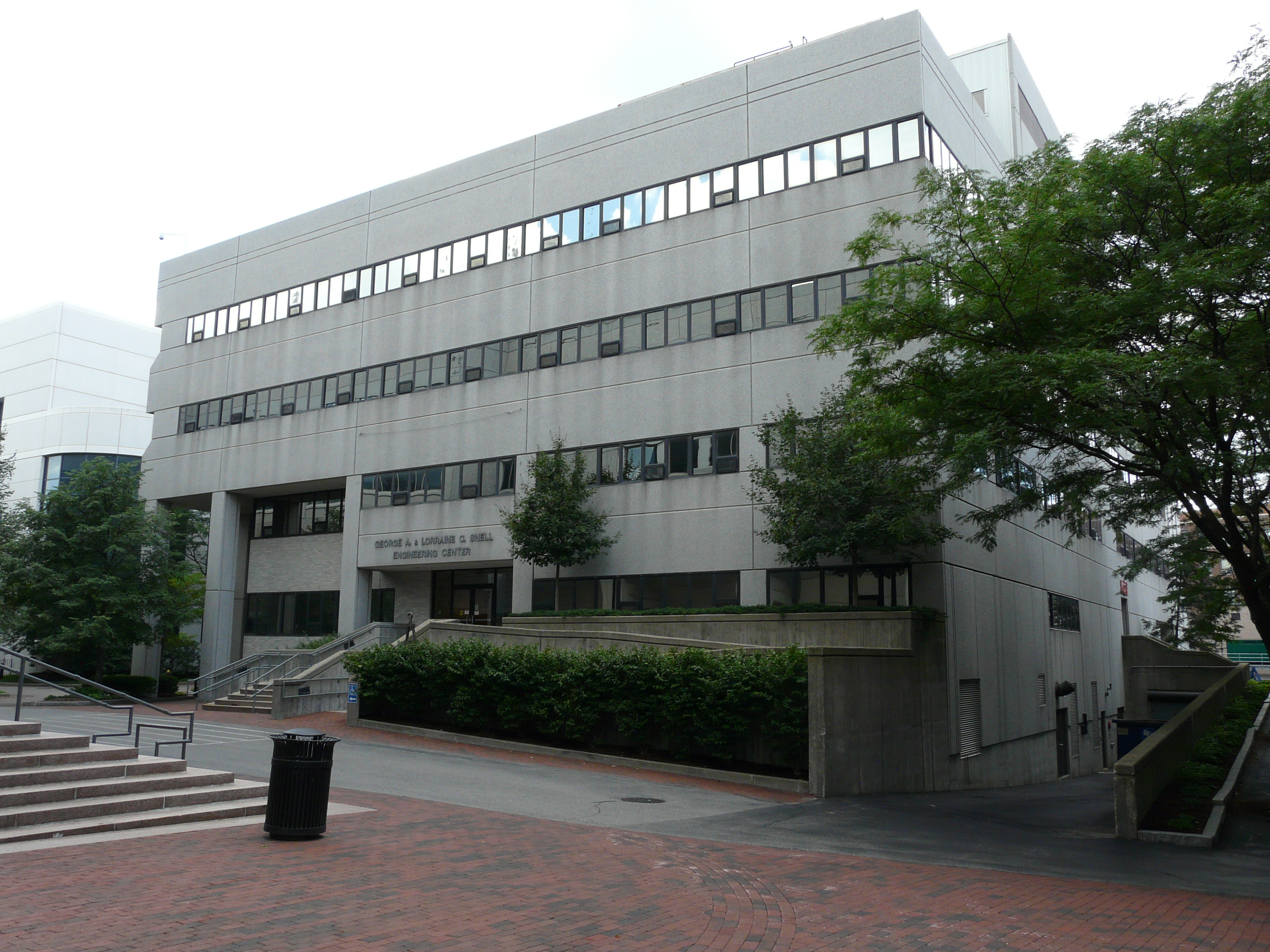
Snell Engineering Center

An engineering department was first established around 1901 as part of the evening educational program at the Boston Young Men's Christian Association (YMCA). The variety in engineering courses was meant to prepare men for work in engineering and industrial design. A Co-operative School of Engineering, the institution's first day school, was formed in 1909. Carl Ell, a future president of Northeastern, joined the engineering faculty after graduate work at Massachusetts Institute of Technology (MIT) in 1910. He became head of Northeastern's civil engineering department two years later and dean of the School of Engineering in 1917. In his first year as dean, he nearly doubled the size of the cooperative education, or co-op, engineering student body from 160 to 235 and the number of co-op engineering industries from 27 to 42. Ell was credited with transforming Northeastern's campus and making its cooperative education, or co-op, program, originally an option within the engineering school, an integral part of the university-wide curriculum.

In 1920, the engineering school received degree-granting powers. In 1936, however, the school failed to receive accreditation largely due to cramped classrooms and inadequate laboratory facilities at the Huntington Avenue YMCA building, but also because its four-year curriculum that included the co-op experience was deemed too short. As a result, a new governing body, the Northeastern University Corporation with an independent board of trustees, was created to give the Boston YMCA less control over the university. The curriculum of the engineering school, which by that time included civil, mechanical, electrical, industrial and chemical engineering programs, was expanded to five years. And the university constructed its first campus building, Richards Hall. By 1960, enrollment at the College of Engineering had reach 2,734 students, making it the largest undergraduate engineering program in New England and one of the largest in the country. Eventually, the engineering school moved into its own space, designed by Keyes and Associates, in 1983.

== Campus ==
Centrally located on Northeastern’s Boston campus, the College of Engineering is housed in the Snell Engineering Center. George Snell, a 1941 alumnus, and his wife, Lorraine, donated money to establish the facility. The building occupies the same area where the first World Series baseball game was played in 1903.

In 2017, Northeastern opened a state-of-the-art interdisciplinary facility in Boston's Roxbury neighborhood on Columbus Avenue. The Interdisciplinary Science and Engineering Complex (ISEC) includes wet and dry laboratory facilities, classroom and office space, a 280-seat auditorium and a large atrium with a spiral staircase totaling 234,000 square feet (21,700 m^{2}) of space to accommodate approximately 700 faculty and graduate students. The construction of the six-story facility is part of the university’s ongoing effort to expand its research across disciplines. In 2023, Northeastern opened EXP, an eight-story, 357,000-square-foot (33,200 m^{2}) science and engineering research facility situated west of ISEC on Columbus Avenue in Roxbury. Designed by architecture firm Payette — which also designed ISEC — and constructed by Suffolk Construction Company at a cost of approximately $300 million, EXP achieved LEED Platinum certification. The building houses research and teaching laboratories, a 15,000-square-foot makerspace equipped with 3D printers, laser cutters, and woodworking facilities, a café, classrooms, executive offices, and a rooftop terrace. Its ground floor features a dedicated high-bay robotics area — approximately the size of a basketball court — designed to support research in autonomous vehicles, drones, and humanoid robots. Together with ISEC and the Northeastern University Pedestrian Crossing (PedX), EXP completes a science and engineering precinct totaling over 600,000 square feet (55,700 m^{2}), serving as a physical and academic link between the Roxbury and Fenway neighborhoods.

The College of Engineering plays a central role in EXP. The building serves as home to the Institute for Experiential Robotics (IER), a university-wide research center directed by professor Taskin Padir that focuses on developing robots capable of learning and executing autonomous behaviors in collaboration with humans. The IER's lab occupies the majority of EXP's first floor and houses collaborative robots, industrial robot arms, mobile robots, drones, and virtual reality systems, with 20 or more faculty from disciplines including robotics, artificial intelligence, computer science, physical therapy, and entrepreneurship conducting research in the shared space. EXP also houses the Institute for Intelligent Networked Systems (formerly Institute for the Wireless Internet of Things), which relocated from ISEC upon EXP's opening. The building's flexible laboratory design allows spaces to be converted between dry, wet, and computational configurations as research needs evolve.

== Academics ==
The College of Engineering offers more than 65 undergraduate and graduate engineering degree programs at the BS, MS and PhD levels, in addition to a wide range of minors and graduate certificates, including the Gordon Engineering Leadership Program which can be combined with any master’s degree. Undergraduate students can participate in the PlusOne accelerated master’s degree program. In addition to the Boston campus, some graduate programs are offered at the university's satellite campus locations.

Beginning in 1909, the College of Engineering was the first school at Northeastern to offer the co-op program. The co-op program gives undergraduate and graduate students an opportunity to work within their profession for four, six, or eight-month periods as part of their educational experience. Co-op positions are available locally and globally, and for industry and research positions.

=== Departments ===
The College of Engineering contains five departments:

- Bioengineering Department
- Chemical Engineering Department
- Civil & Environmental Engineering Department
- Electrical & Computer Engineering Department
- Mechanical & Industrial Engineering Department

== Rankings ==
For the magazine's 2026 edition, the undergraduate engineering program was ranked #35 and its graduate engineering program #34.

== Research ==
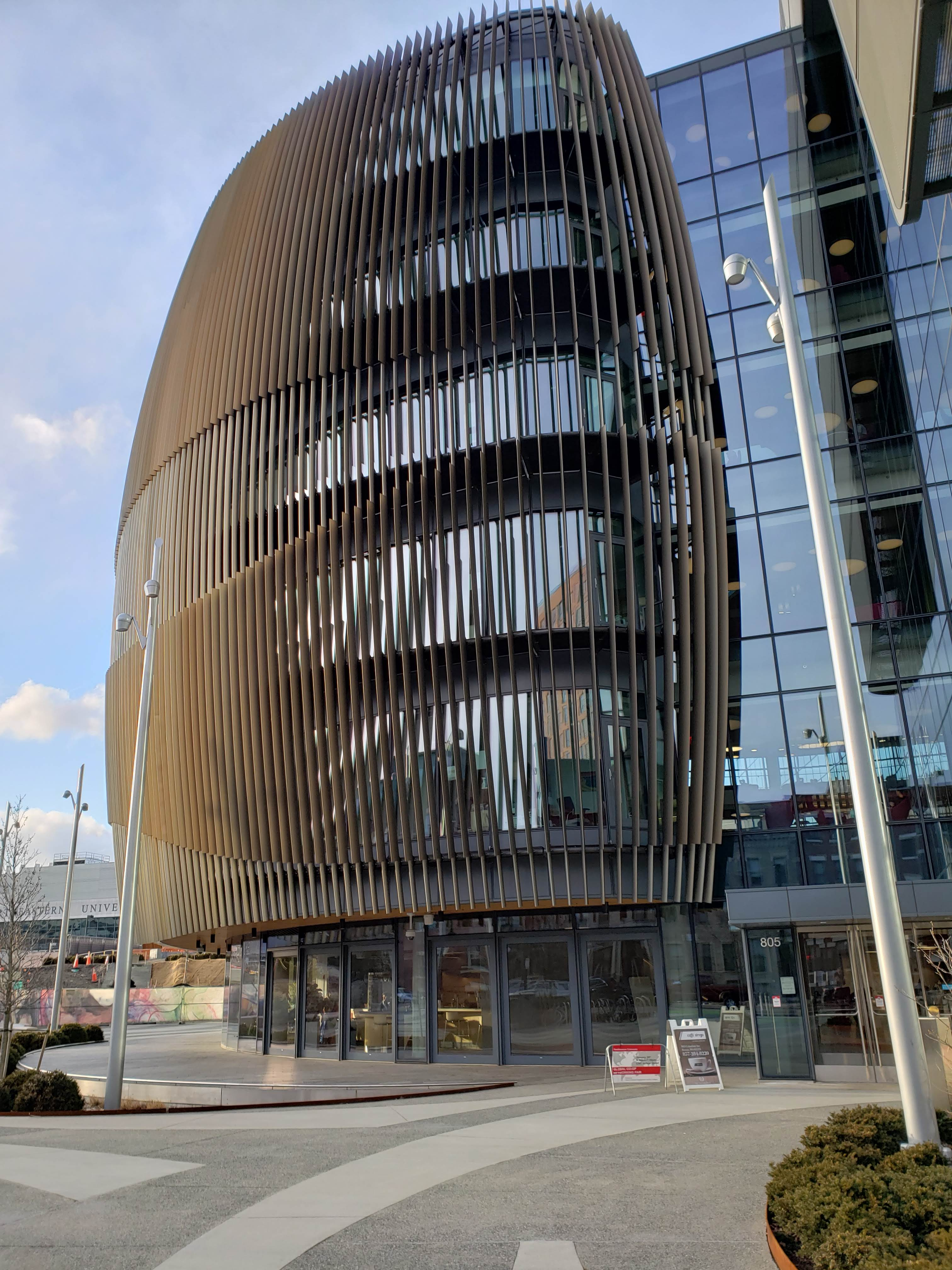
The Interdisciplinary Science and Engineering Complex (ISEC) at Northeastern University.

A major goal of Northeastern engineers is to lead the way in interdisciplinary research. Collaborations between biologists, chemists, physicists, geologists and physicians seek new answers to problems like tumor detection, soil remediation and emissions control. Some of these explorations with industrial partners have been instrumental in making better products in industries from telecommunications to automotive manufacturing.
