= Belle Adler =

American journalist and documentary filmmaker

- Education: The Calhoun School (MJ)
- Occupations: Journalist, television producer, documentary filmmaker and academic
- Employer(s): CNN; Northeastern University; University of California, Berkeley

Belle Adler is an American investigative journalist, television producer, and documentary filmmaker. She is the admissions evaluator for Haas School of Business at University of California, Berkeley. She was previously an associate professor of journalism at Northeastern University School of Journalism.

== Career ==
Adler earned her Master of Journalism from The Calhoun School in 1976. She worked as a producer and editor at CNN for nine years, during which she was an assignment editor, producer and tape editor in the San Francisco and New York bureaus. She was producer for a weekly medical show, "Your Health," and was later the U.N. producer covering the Gulf War.

Adler produced American Dream, American Nightmare that aired in November 2000 on A&E's Investigative Reports, narrated by Bill Kurtis. The documentary focused on the systemic impact of the Immigration and Nationality Technical Corrections Act of 1994, particularly on legal permanent residents facing deportation for minor offenses committed years prior.

Adler and Brad White produced Operation Animal Shield that aired on Animal Planet in September 2002 and later Discovery International. Adler and White followed two American General Aviation pilots, Patty Wagstaff and Dale Snodgrass, to Kenya as the aviators helped train wildlife rangers in collaboration with the Kenya Wildlife Service. The aviators would come under fire from armed elephant poachers while conducting low-level patrols and trained rangers in "potentially lifesaving aerobatic and evasive maneuvers." During an October 2023 event sponsored by Cinema Studies and the Center for Interdisciplinary Studies at Northeastern University, Adler spoke about her experience as an observer of the poaching industry during the production of Operation Animal Shield. According to her: "Before I traveled to Africa, I didn’t realize poaching was such an organized crime with hardcore soldiers and so internationally coordinated.I also didn’t realize how dire the situation was. We are talking about not just a few animals, but entire species that are being affected.” Adler also noted that with Operation Animal Shield, she wanted to give people the "opportunity to see what a huge problem poaching is in other countries."

== Awards and honors ==
In 1994, Adler was announced as the Jefferson Fellow at the East/West Center of the University of Hawaii in Oahu.

For her documentary American Dream, American Nightmare, Adler received the Hillman Prize from The Sidney Hillman Foundation in 2001. In 2002, Adler and Brad White were the joint receipients of the Karant Award for TV in the Program Length category for Operation Animal Shield at the 2003 Aircraft Owners and Pilots Association (AOPA) journalism awards.

Adler has won two Northern California Emmys for her work. She was one of the judges for Tufts University's "501c3: Capturing Change on Camera" inaugural video competition supporting nonprofits that help children, families and filmmakers use visual storytelling to spotlight their lived experiences.

== Personal life ==
Adler lives in Berkeley. She has one son.

Adler joined the current and former Northeastern University School of Journalism faculty members to condemn the "unconstitutional arrests of independent journalists Don Lemon and Georgia Fort" in 2026. In the past, she has made a donation to support Albany Scanner, an independent news outlet reporting on issues specific to Albany, California.
