= Lemieux =

Lemieux may refer to:

- Lemieux (surname)
- Lemieux, Ontario, a ghost town in Ontario
- Lemieux, Quebec, a municipality in Québec
- Lemieux Island, in the middle of the Ottawa River, National Capital Region, Canada
- Lemieux Library, Seattle University, Washington, U.S.
- Lemieux–Johnson oxidation, a chemical reaction named after Raymond Lemieux and W. S. Johnson
