= Zolan Kanno-Youngs =

American journalist

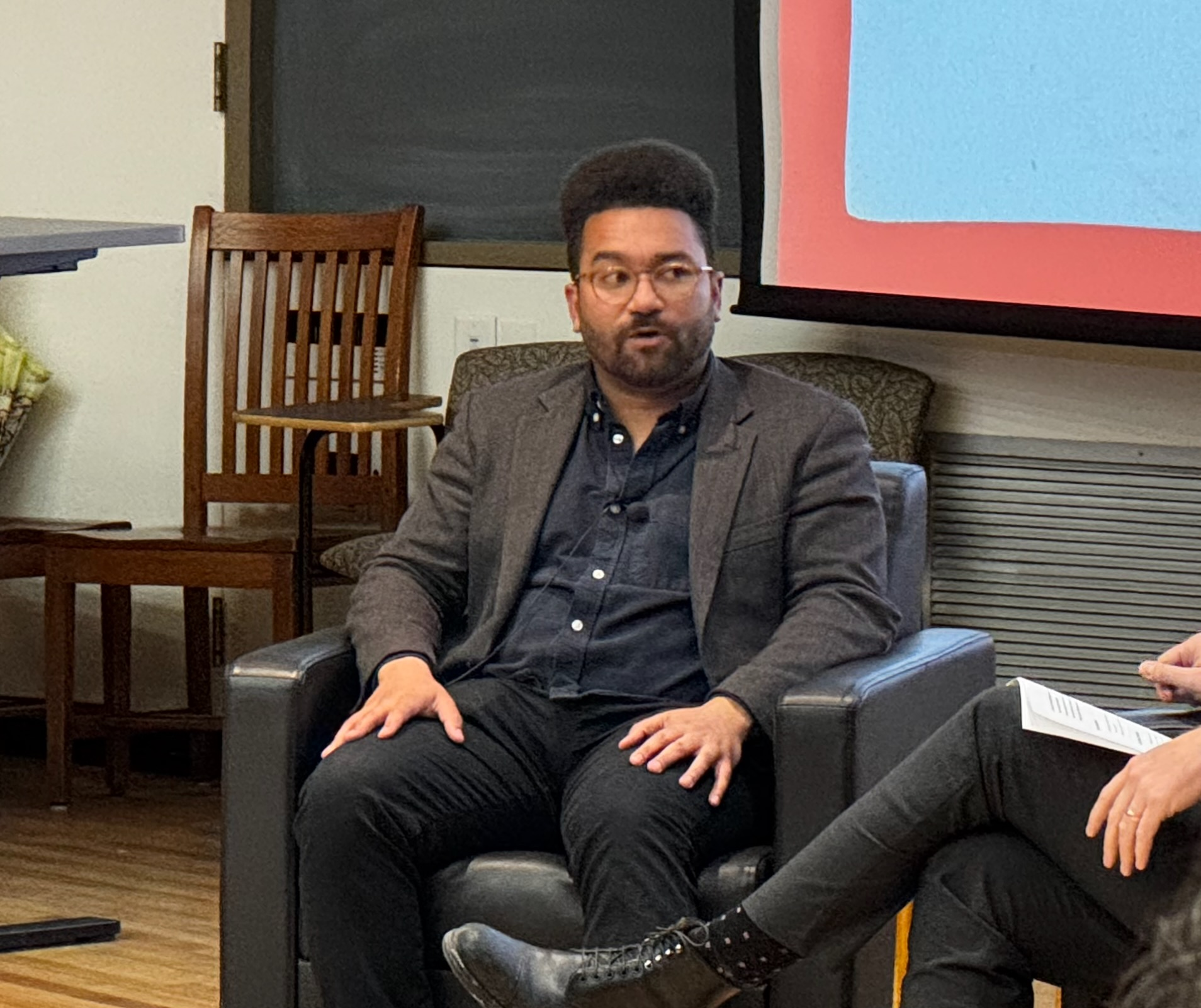
- Kanno-Youngs in 2026
- Education: Northeastern University
- Occupation: Journalist
- Years active: 2012–present
- Employer: The New York Times

Zolan Kanno-Youngs is an American journalist based in Washington, D.C., who is a White House correspondent for The New York Times. He was previously a criminal justice reporter for The Wall Street Journal.

== Early life and education ==
Raised in Cambridge, Massachusetts, Kanno-Youngs attended Cambridge Rindge and Latin School. He graduated from Northeastern University in 2016.

== Career ==
Kanno-Youngs started his career as an intern and sports reporter at several outlets in 2012 including The Boston Globe and USA Today. He became a reporter covering law enforcement in the New York area for The Wall Street Journal in 2015.

Kanno-Youngs covered the Department of Homeland Security for The New York Times from February 2019 until October 2022, as one of the newspaper's lead writers on immigration at the U.S. southern border with Mexico and the Trump administration. He was appointed White House correspondent in March 2021. He has made appearances on MSNBC and CTV News.
