= Northeastern University School of Journalism =

Northeastern University School of Journalism and Media Innovation
- Type: Private
- Established: 1959
- Parent institution: Northeastern University
- Director: Jonathan Kaufman
- Academic staff: 30
- Students: 305
- Undergraduates: 225
- Postgraduates: 80
- Location: Boston, Massachusetts, United States; 42.338264°N 71.090739°W
- Campus: Urban
- Website: camd.northeastern.edu/journalism

Northeastern University School of Journalism and Media Innovation is the journalism school of Northeastern University, a private research university with its main campus in Boston, Massachusetts. In addition to the school's undergraduate and graduate degree programs, Northeastern's flagship cooperative education program allows students to alternate semesters of full-time study and semesters of full-time, professional work in newsrooms, public relations firms, advertising agencies and non-profit organizations.

== History ==
The Northeastern School of Journalism can trace its origin to 1959, when the English department began offering a journalism major following the university's liberal arts expansion beyond its foundational engineering and business programs. Boston native George A. Speers, a Yankee Quill Award recipient and Northeastern alumnus who previously worked in the university's press office, was appointed the first chairman of the newly formed journalism department in 1965. In 1986, the journalism department was reorganized and renamed the "School of Journalism." LaRue Gilleland, chairman of the journalism department at the University of Nevada, Reno, left to eventually become the first director of Northeastern's School of Journalism. Gilleland had had a long journalism career in Honolulu, Los Angeles, Tulsa and Memphis prior to going into academia. Following Gilleland's tenure from 1981 to 1992, he was credited by The Boston Globe with transforming a "small journalism department into a top-ranking J-School." Under his leadership, the department grew from three to 12 faculty members and student enrollment more than doubled. Gilleland's philosophy was that a journalist has to know a lot about a lot, which he put into practice by insisting on both a journalism core curriculum and an arts and sciences core curriculum. He also added new concentrations to reflect the changing world of communications. Following this success, a graduate program was unanimously approved in 1985.

Nicholas Daniloff, a Harvard-educated former Moscow bureau chief for U.S. News & World Report, was chosen to serve as director of the school from 1992 to 1999. He was recognized for setting high standards. In 2002, Stephen Burgard, an alumnus of Brown University and Boston University, was appointed director of the school, where he served until 2014. A former editor at the Los Angeles Times, he was praised for helping the school embrace reporting in the digital age and guiding its integration into the newly created College of Arts, Media and Design (CAMD) at Northeastern. In recent years, the school has added courses and programs in coding, information visualization, videography, database management and game design. In 2015, veteran business journalist Jonathan Kaufman, a graduate of Yale and Harvard, was selected as director of the journalism school. He previously worked at Bloomberg News, The Wall Street Journal, where he spent time as China bureau chief, and The Boston Globe, earning two Pulitzer Prizes during his career.

== Academics ==
=== Undergraduate programs ===
The school's undergraduate program prepares students for a Bachelor of Arts (B.A.) degree in journalism. The school also offers combined majors as well as minors.

=== Graduate programs ===
Northeastern is one of only a few programs in New England that offers a postgraduate degree in journalism. The graduate program features three distinct degree programs. The professional track leading to a Master of Arts (M.A.) degree in journalism is designed for students from all backgrounds who take courses from a curriculum that combines a fundamental newsgathering education with new media courses. The media innovation and data communication track is a STEM-designated Master of Science (M.S.) degree program designed for mid-career journalists who want to enhance their digital and multimedia skills. A second Master of Science degree program in media advocacy provides training in advocacy from a strategic communications and legal perspective.

=== Cooperative education ===
In between regular terms of academic study, most students complete at least one cooperative education, or co-op, experience, working full-time at companies, agencies and organizations around the world that complement their academic major or interests. Co-ops typically range from three to six months. The Boston media market itself is among the top 10 U.S. media markets. It includes two daily newspapers, The Boston Globe and Boston Herald plus The Christian Science Monitor; multiple local television news stations, as well as two public television stations GBH and GBH 44 that produce the Frontline and American Experience national documentary series; New England Cable News, which is a 24-hour cable news network; two public radio stations WBUR and GBH that produce national programs; Boston Magazine; and the sports website Barstool Sports.

== Organization and research ==
The Northeastern School of Journalism is housed in Northeastern's College of Arts, Media and Design (CAMD). Faculty publish in a variety of scholarly publications and popular media. Many students contribute to and edit in-house publications such as The Scope, Global Observer and Storybench, assist faculty with research through the Co-Laboratory for Data Impact; Center for Communications, Media Innovation and Social Change; or gain international reporting experience on reporting trips abroad.

== Campus ==
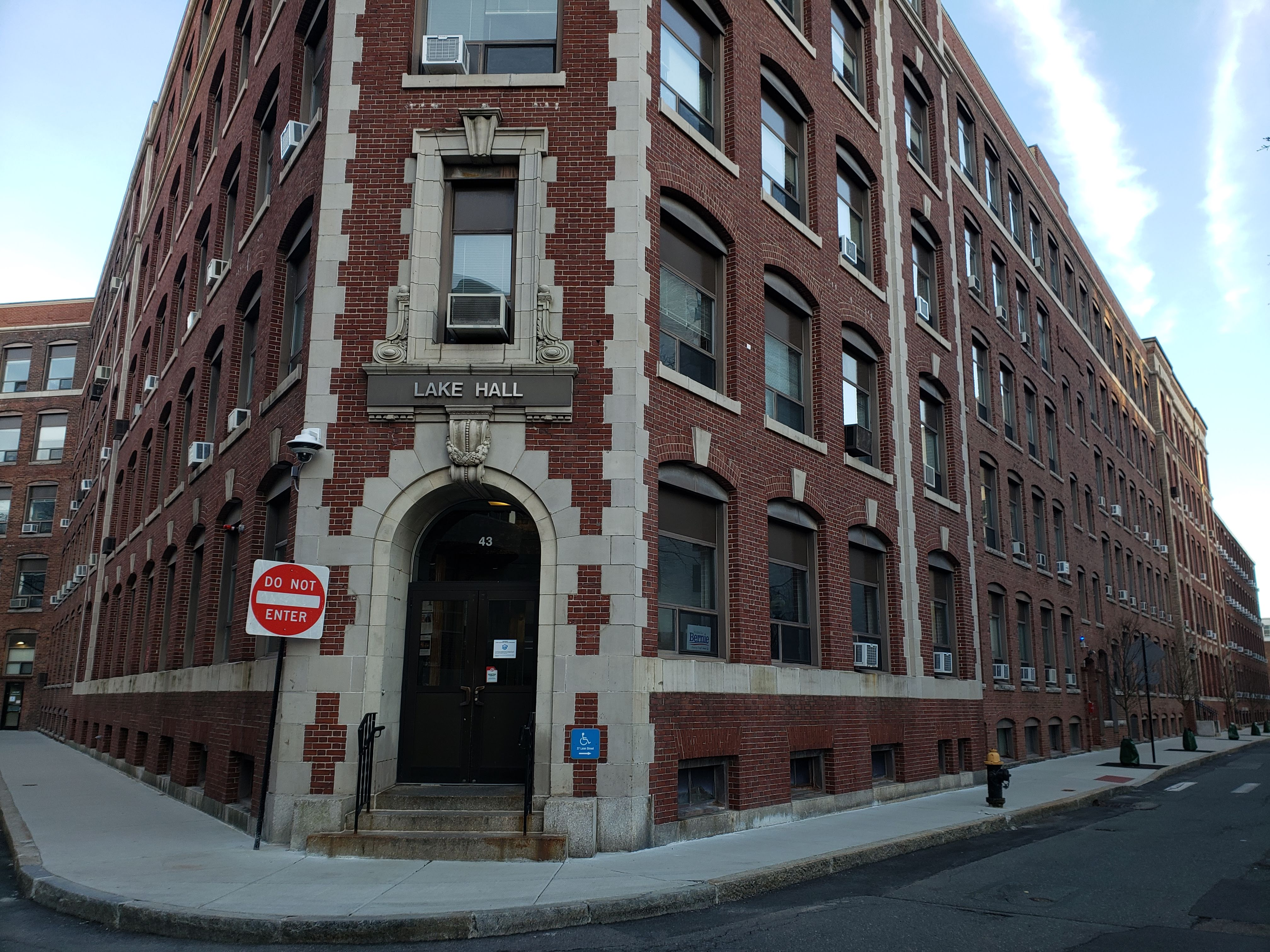
Lake Hall

The journalism school is located near the center of Northeastern's Boston campus just off Huntington Avenue in Lake Hall, constructed around 1911. It includes an innovation lab, computer lab and podcast studio. The building once belonged to the United Drug Company. Originally, the drug company built six "turn-of-the-century industrial architecture" buildings as part of its corporate offices, and manufacturing and research facilities designed by the Boston firm of Gay and Proctor, and later modified by Wheelwright, Haven & Hoyt. Northeastern purchased them in 1961 and eventually demolished three structures in preparation of a sports facility. However, that plan was soon scrapped as the rapidly growing university was in need of office and laboratory spaces. One of the surviving red brick buildings, featuring terracotta ornamentation, was divided into four sections now known as Lake Hall, Holmes Hall, Nightingale Hall and Meserve Hall.

=== Student media and other activities ===
The Huntington News, founded in 1926 as The Northeastern News following the merger of two other campus newspapers, is Northeastern's independent student newspaper. It became the university's only independent news source when it severed ties from the university in 2008. WRBB (104.9 FM) is a student-run radio station that has served the Greater Boston area since it was founded in 1962. The Scope is a student-run digital magazine that prides itself on telling stories in the Greater Boston area that other news media overlook. The Global Observer is an online publication focused on international news and feature stories that is primarily run by international students. Storybench, a digital storytelling site staffed by students, examines the latest in digital storytelling. Northeastern University TV (NUTV), the university's only student-run video production club, produces campus news, sports and entertainment programming. Through Northeastern's Dialogue of Civilizations summer program, students can choose to travel abroad with a university faculty member for about 30 days to learn about a specific topic or course subject.

== Notable alumni ==
- Leila Fadel – international correspondent, National Public Radio
- Nat Hentoff – contributing editor, The New Yorker Magazine
- Byron Hurt – award-winning documentary filmmaker
- Zolan Kanno-Youngs – reporter, The New York Times
- Will McDonough – sportswriter, The Boston Globe
- Marc Myers – contributing writer, The Wall Street Journal
- Walter V. Robinson – investigative journalist, The Boston Globe; 2003 Pulitzer Prize for Public Service
- Swati Sharma – editor in chief, Vox.com
- Michael Slackman – international managing editor, The New York Times
- Wendy Williams – television and radio host, The Wendy Williams Show
