= Beulah Providence =

- Born: April 8, 1928 (age 98)

Beulah Providence (April 8, 1928) is a co-founder of the Caribbean Foundation of Boston. The nonprofit organization focuses on providing services to the elderly and physically challenged in Boston.

== Early life ==
Providence was born on April 8, 1928, in Dominica, in the Caribbean. Providence emigrated from the Caribbean to the United States in 1960 and worked as a housekeeper until 1968. She earned a scholarship to attend Northeastern University in Boston, Massachusetts where she studied community organization and social institutions.

== Career ==
In 1973, Providence co-founded the Caribbean Foundation of Boston with fellow Caribbean women. The non-profit organization was founded to provide support to underserved communities, specifically Caribbean immigrants, elderly people, and people with disabilities.

By 1975, the organization was able to expand its services by delivering human support, helping with cooking, shopping, cleaning, bathing, and other daily activities. The Caribbean Foundation of Boston is a vital resource for underserved communities, and at the time, became one of Boston's first non-profits centered around the needs of the elderly and individuals with impairments.

Providence served as a board member on the Home Care Aide Council, and the Project R.I.G.H.T. board from 2014 to 2015.

== Honors and recognition ==
Beulah Providence has received recognition for her contribution to community service and the city of Boston. She received the "Hometown Hero Award" from WHDH-TV, the "Through the Ages Award" from the Eldercare Charitable Foundation and Ethos, and the Drum Major for Justice Award from Central Boston Elder Services.

Providence has also been recognized for her work by the Bay State Dominica Association, Inc. She was honored at the Bishop James Augustine Healy Awards Dinner, where she received the Black Catholic Community's Healy Award alongside Sister Margaret A. Leonard. She was honored at the Afro-Caribbean Black History Gala & Awards. In 2024, Providence received the President's Award from the Whittier Street Health Center.

In 2023, she was recognized as one of "Boston's most admired, beloved, and successful Black Women leaders" by the Black Women Lead project.
