= Michael Slackman =

American journalist

- Occupation: Assistant Managing Editor for News
- Notable credit: The New York Times

Michael Slackman is an American journalist for The New York Times. As one of the paper's lead editors, he currently oversees the daily news report, presiding over the team that has eyes on all of the paper's top stories.

From 2014 to 2022, as head of the International desk, Slackman was in charge of The New York Times international coverage. He managed more than 30 Times bureaus, newsrooms in London and Seoul and hundreds of employees around the globe.

Slackman was deputy foreign editor from 2011 to 2014, helping oversee all global coverage, with an emphasis on coordinating the Middle East report. Before returning to New York, in May 2011, Slackman was a foreign correspondent for The Times for six years.

As a correspondent, Slackman was the Berlin bureau chief, a posting that lasted a year. Previously, he spent eight years based in Egypt, three for The Los Angeles Times and five for The New York Times. During that period he reported from every country in the region, from Morocco to Iran. He covered Iraq before and after the 2003 invasion, and as both a reporter and an editor, he has helped document the tremendous changes sweeping the Arab world.

Before going to the Middle East, Slackman was the Moscow bureau chief for Newsday for three years, covering the economy and social chaos of post-Soviet Russia and the leadership transition from Yeltsin to Putin (1998-2001). As International editor for The New York Times, he has overseen teams that won the Pulitzer Prize for international reporting in 2017, 2020 and in 2022. He was part of the Newsday team that won the Pulitzer Prize for spot news reporting in 1997. He is a graduate of Northeastern University.

== Life ==
Slackman graduated from the Northeastern University School of Journalism.

He was the Cairo Bureau Chief, for the Los Angeles Times, and the Moscow Bureau Chief for Newsday.

He was The New York Times Berlin bureau chief from June 2009 to June 2010 and the Cairo bureau chief from 2002 to 2009.

== Awards and honors ==
He won a 1997 National Award for Education Reporting. Newsday won the 1997 Pulitzer Prize for Spot News Reporting, for its coverage of TWA Flight 800, and Slackman was part of the team.
