= Pietro Saja =

Italian painter (1779–1833)

Pietro Saja (Sessano del Molise, 1779 – Naples, 1833) was an Italian painter, active in Naples and Caserta in a Neoclassical style.

== Biography ==
He was a pupil of Johann Heinrich Wilhelm Tischbein at the Academy of Fine Arts of Naples, but was sent with a stipend to study in the Academy of St Luke in Rome. In 1803, Saja became member of the Roman Academy. He painted "La Vestale", about the legend of the Burial Alive of the Vestal Virgin Rhea Silvia. He also painted the Apotheosis of the Government of Ferdinand I, King of the Two Sicilies (La Gloria dei Borbone, 1816) for the Palace of Caserta.

Among other works, Saja painted a Death of Virginia (1802–1804), Death of Hector, Tancred discovers Clorinda, a Madonna for the King, St Francis Xavier for the Queen. He painted in the church of San Leucio near Caserta.

== See also ==
- Civiltà dell'Ottocento : le arti figurative, Napoli : Electa, 1997.
