= Yuliya Snihur =

- Born: Lviv, Ukraine
- Citizenship: Belgian
- Education: Ph.D. in Business Management (IESE Business School)
- Alma mater: Northeastern University
- Occupations: Professor and researcher
- Employer: IESE Business School

Yuliya Snihur (Lviv, January 18, 1982) is a Belgian researcher and professor specializing in entrepreneurship and innovation. She was a professor at Toulouse Business School (France); and since 2023 she has been part of the academic staff at IESE Business School (Spain).

== Education and professional career ==
Snihur holds a degree in International Business from Northeastern University (United States) and European Management from NEOMA Business School (France). She obtained her master's degree in research and doctorate (Ph.D.) in Business Management at IESE Business School (Spain). Her thesis "Business Model Innovation: Exploring the Concept, its Antecedents Consequences" (2013) received the 2014 Heizer award for doctoral thesis from the Academy of Management.

She was a professor at Toulouse Business School between 2013-2023. She joined IESE Business School's Department of Entrepreneurship in 2023.

== Research ==
Her research lies at the intersection of entrepreneurship, innovation, and organization theory. She is interested in how entrepreneurial leaders design innovative and high-performing business models in both new and established firms when facing technological change, disruptions, and evolving ecosystems. She researches the role of time and language in entrepreneurship leveraging cognitive and linguistic approaches such as framing.

== Scientific publications ==
Her research has been published in journals, including Academy of Management Journal, Academy of Management Review, Journal of Management, Journal of Business Venturing, Journal of Management Studies, Entrepreneurship Theory and Practice, and Strategic Entrepreneurship Journal.

=== Books ===
- Burgelman, R. A., Snihur, Y. & Thomas, L. D. W. (2023). Strategy-making and organizational evolution. A Managerial agency perspective. Cambridge: Cambridge University Press.

=== Outstanding academic papers ===
- Snihur, Y. & Zott, C. 2020: The Genesis and Metamorphosis of Novelty Imprints: How Business Model Innovation Emerges in Young Ventures. AMJ, 63, 554–583.
- Burgelman, R. A., Snihur, Y., & Thomas, L. D. W. (2021). Why Multibusiness Corporations Split: CEO Strategizing as the Ecosystem Evolves. Journal of Management, 48(7), 2108-2151. (Original work published 2022)
- Snihur, Y., & Clarysse, B., (2022) Sowing the seeds of failure: Organizational identity dynamics in new venture pivoting. Journal of Business Venturing, 37 (1).
