= JPG (magazine) =

Online photography magazine

- Editor: Sahar Khraibani
- Categories: Photography
- Frequency: Online
- Publisher: 100 Tribes, Inc.
- Founded: 2019
- Country: United States
- Based in: New York, New York
- Language: English
- Website: jpgmagazine.com

JPG was an online photography magazine published by 100 Tribes, Inc. in New York City.

== History and profile ==
JPG magazine was originally published by the husband and wife team Derek Powazek and Heather Powazek Champ in 2004. It was published 4 times a year by 8020 Publishing.JPG magazine was originally self-published through Lulu. The magazine was headquartered in San Francisco. In 2006, after receiving venture capital funding from CNET founder Halsey Minor, JPG re-launched as an offset-printed magazine with retail distribution, appearing six times a year. The first print run was about 20,000 copies, while the website drew some 1.5 million page views in the first month after the re-launch.

In May 2007, founding editors and creators of the magazine Derek Powazek and Heather Champ announced their departure after a power struggle with 8020 Publishing CEO Paul Cloutier. Cloutier also left the company in 2008.

On January 2, 2009, JPG magazine announced that they were going to shut down operations on January 5, after running into cash-flow problems. After a grass-roots effort started by 15x100's Struan Oglanby at savejpg.com, investor interest came to life as the official website enthusiastically acknowledged, thus offering new hope for the magazine, contributors and readers.

In February 2009, it was announced that new investors had acquired JPG magazine and were re-launching the print magazine, website and associated assets. However, by May 2009 there was no sign of a printed magazine but new photography themes continued to be hosted on the JPG website until September 2019.

In 2019, the JPG brand was acquired and trademarked by 100 Tribes, Inc. and moved to New York City where it was reinvented as a new print magazine featuring images contributed and curated by a global community of amateur photographers via a mobile app. The first print issue was to be spearheaded by Publisher Dev Tandon and Editor-In-Chief Sahar Khraibani but was delayed indefinitely due to the COVID pandemic.

In 2020, the JPG brand was acquired by Viewbug.com in San Diego.
