= Rupal Patel (scientist) =

Speech scientist working in USA

- Education: University of Toronto
- Scientific career
- Fields: speech science; synthetic speech
- Workplaces: Northeastern University, USA
- Thesis: Identifying information-bearing prosodic parameters in severely dysarthric vocalizations (2000)
- Doctoral advisor: Bernard O'Keefe

Rupal Patel is a professor at Northeastern University, in Boston, United States in the area of speech science, human computer interaction and artificial intelligence. She is the director of the university's Communication Analysis and Design Laboratory.

== Education ==
Patel gained her B. Sc. degree in neuropsychology from University of Calgary, graduating in 1993. She undertook further study at University of Toronto and gained her doctorate in the subject of speech acoustics in 2000 and completed a post doctorate at Massachusetts Institute of Technology.

== Career ==
From 2001-2003 she was an assistant professor at Teacher’s College Columbia University. In 2003 she was appointed as an assistant professor at Northeastern University, and was promoted to professor in 2014. Her post is jointly between the university's Bouvé College of Health Sciences and Khoury College of Computer Sciences, reflecting her research. This has concentrated on the acquisition and impairment of speech, specifically prosody, in healthy speakers and those with neuromotor disorders. This has led to the very practical design of speech enhancement to generate naturalistic synthetic voices for those with speech disorders by making use of their residual speaking ability and learning technologies to help kids read with natural inflection and rhythm.

Since the mid 2000s she has led development of computer systems that can generate a naturalistic synthetic voice. This resulted from her work on speech analysis. Those with speech disorders can often produce a sound, but cannot shape it into speech with their mouths. Her research group developed a computer system that allowed speech to be different for each individual based on their natural sound. The pitch, loudness, breathiness and clarity of normal speech was generated by applying the computer system to a recording of a sample of the sound the individual was able to produce. By 2013 she could produce synthetic voices in the laboratory.

She founded the spin-out company VOCALiD in 2014 and has continued development of the machine learning and speech blending used for generating the synthetic voices. By the early 2020s the systems were able to reproduce existing voices as well as synthesise new ones. One use was for voice actors to be able to have an exact copy, or clone, of their voice to use in their work.

== Publications ==
Patel is the author or co-author of over 70 scientific publications or book chapters. In 2013 she was invited to present a TED talk about Synthetic voices, as unique as fingerprints.
