= Walter V. Robinson =

American journalist (born 1946)

- Born: January 13, 1946 (age 80); Boston, Massachusetts, U.S.
- Education: Boston College High School
- Alma mater: Northeastern University
- Occupation: Newspaper editor
- Employer: The Boston Globe
- Known for: Exposing the coverage of the Roman Catholic clergy sexual abuse scandal "Debtors Hell" series
- Spouse: Barbara Wojtklewicz
- Children: Jessica Robinson
- Awards: • Goldsmith Prize for Investigative Reporting • Investigative Reporters and Editors Award • Selden Ring Award • Worth Bingham Prize

Walter V. Robinson (born January 13, 1946) is an American investigative reporter serving as editor-at-large at The Boston Globe, where he has worked as reporter and editor for 34 years. From 2007 to 2014, he was a distinguished professor of journalism at the Northeastern University School of Journalism. Robinson is the Donald W. Reynolds Visiting Professor of Journalism at the Walter Cronkite School of Journalism and Mass Communication at Arizona State University, and a professor of practice at the Northeastern University School of Journalism. He has reported for the Globe from 48 states and more than 30 countries.

== Notable investigative reporting ==
Robinson led the Globe's coverage of the Roman Catholic clergy sexual abuse scandal, for which the newspaper won, and he personally accepted, the 2003 Pulitzer Prize for Public Service.

The last investigation Robinson led for the Spotlight Team, "Debtors Hell", exposed the practices of debt collectors. It was a finalist for the Local Reporting Pulitzer in 2007. The Pulitzer Board cited the staff's "well documented exposure, in print and online, of unscrupulous debt collectors, causing two firms to close and prompting action by state officials."

== Profile ==
Robinson graduated from Boston College High School and Northeastern University with a journalism degree. In the 1960s, he interrupted his college studies to join the Army. He was commissioned a Second Lieutenant in January 1968. After two years in Hawaii, Robinson served as an intelligence officer with the First Cavalry Division (Airmobile) in Vietnam from 1970 to 1971. During his Globe career, he was a local, state, and national political reporter. Robinson has covered and written extensively about the World War II-era looting of thousands of pieces of cultural artworks from German institutions. He covered the presidential elections of 1984, 1988, 1992, and 2000. Robinson covered the White House for the Globe during the presidencies of Ronald Reagan and George H. W. Bush. In 1990 and 1991, he was the Globe's Middle East Bureau Chief, and covered the first Persian Gulf War.

Robinson was the Globe's city editor from 1992 to 1993, and assistant managing editor for local news from 1993 to 1996. He was the paper's roving national and foreign correspondent from 1997 to 1999. During his Globe career, Robinson reported from more than 30 foreign countries and 48 states. As assistant managing editor for investigations, he ran the newspaper's investigative Spotlight Team for seven years, until 2006. In 1998, he became the first recipient of the Archaeological Institute of America's Award for Outstanding Public Service.

While a professor at Northeastern, Robinson started the Initiative for Investigative Reporting. Students who took his seminar in investigative reporting produced 26 investigative stories the Globe published.

Robinson has been a journalism fellow at Stanford University and has received honorary degrees from Northeastern University and Emerson College.

== Accolades ==
Besides the Pulitzer Prize for Public Service, The Boston Globe also received the Goldsmith Prize for Investigative Reporting from Harvard University, the Investigative Reporters and Editors Award, the Selden Ring Award, and the Worth Bingham Prize, all for its coverage of the Catholic Church sexual abuse cases.

Robinson won the inaugural Archaeological Institute of America Award for outstanding public service in 1998, recognizing his work on the trade in antiquities, and looting archaeological sites for profit. Also in 1997–98, he covered the trade and display in museums of artworks looted by Nazis during World War II.

Michael Keaton portrayed Robinson in the 2015 film Spotlight, which won Best Picture at the 88th Academy Awards.
