= Peter K. Manning =

American sociologist (born 1940)

Peter Kirby Manning
- Born: September 27, 1940 (age 85); Salem, Oregon
- Education: Duke University; Willamette University; Grant High School
- Known for: Policing; Qualitative Methods; Semiotics
- Awards: Charles Horton Cooley Award for Scholarly Contributions to Sociology (1994)
- Scientific career
- Fields: Sociology; Criminology
- Workplaces: Garfinkel Archive; Northeastern University; Oxford University; University of Surrey; University of London; Michigan State University; Missouri University (Columbia); Duke University
- Notable students: Michael W. Raphael; Benjamin B. Davis

Peter K. Manning (born September 27, 1940) is an American sociologist who is an author and speaker on the topic of policing organizations.

== Background ==
Peter K. Manning was born in Salem, Oregon on September 27, 1940. He graduated from Willamette University in 1961. Manning went on to earn his M.A. and Ph.D. in Sociology from Duke University in 1963 and 1966 respectively.

== Career ==
Peter K. Manning is a Senior Fellow at The Garfinkel Archive. He previously held the Brooks Chair in the College of Criminal Justice at Northeastern University, Boston, MA. He has taught at Michigan State, MIT, Oxford, and the University of Michigan. "His research interests includes the rationalizing and interplay of private and public policing, democratic policing, crime mapping and crime analysis, uses of information technology, and qualitative methods."

== Manning's works ==
- Youth and Sociology
- Youth: Divergent Perspectives
- The Sociology of Mental Health and Illness
- Police Work: The Social Organization of Policing
- Policing: A View from the Street
- Police Narcotics Control: Patterns and Strategies
- The Narcs' Game: Organizational and Informational Limits on Drug Law Enforcement
- Handbook of Social Science Methods, Volume II, Qualitative Methods
- Semiotics and Fieldwork
- Symbolic Communication: Signifying Calls and the Police Response
- Organizational Communication
- The Privatization of Policing: Two Views
- Policing Contingencies
- The Technology of Policing: Crime Mapping, Information Technology and the Rationality of Crime Control
- Democratic Policing in a Changing World with Michael W. Raphael
- Manning, Peter K. (2010). Democratic Policing in a Changing World. Boulder, CO: Paradigm Publishers. ISBN 978-1-59451-546-0.

== Listed in ==
- American Men and Women of Science and Behavioral Sciences, Jacques Cattell Press: Tucson, Arizona, from 1970 edition.
- Contemporary Authors, Gale Research, Detroit, Michigan, from 1977 edition
