= Lynn Chiavaro =

American basketball coach

Biographical details
- Born: 1954 (age 71–72); Port Chester, New York, U.S.

Playing career
- 1973–1976: Northeastern
- 1978–1981: New York Stars
- Position: Guard

Coaching career (HC unless noted)
- 1981–1982: Iona (asst.)
- 1982–1987: Army (asst.)
- 1987–1998: Army

Head coaching record
- Overall: 133–175 (.432)
- Tournaments: 1–1 (NCAA Division II)

Accomplishments and honors

Championships
- Empire State Tournament (1988)

Lynn Arturi-Chiavaro (born 1954) is an American former basketball coach. She was head coach of Army women's basketball from 1987 to 1998.

== Playing career ==
Originally from Port Chester, New York, Chiavaro graduated from Maria Regina High School. She then attended Northeastern University, lettering in basketball from 1973 to 1976 and also playing lacrosse. Former Northeastern men's basketball coach Jim Calhoun once rated Chiavaro as one of the best shooters he had ever seen. Chiavaro graduated from Northeastern in 1977 with a degree in physical science.

In 1978 Chiavaro was drafted by the New York Stars of the short lived Women's Professional Basketball League.

== Coaching career ==
Chiavaro became an assistant coach at Iona College during the 1981 and 1982 seasons before becoming an assistant at Army in 1982 under Harold Johnson. In 1987, Chiavaro was promoted to head coach. In 11 seasons, she had a 133–175 record from 1987 to 1998.

After leaving Army, Chiavaro became a financial advisor with Northwestern Mutual in 2000.

== Head coaching record ==
Record table
Season	Team	Overall	Conference	Standing	Postseason
Army Cadets (Empire State Conference) (1987–1990)
1987–88	Army	19–13	7–5	3rd	NCAA Division II Second Round
1988–89	Army	11–15	6–5	4th	
1989–90	Army	19–10	10–2	4th	
Army (ESC):		49–38 (.563)	23–12 (.657)		
Army Cadets (Patriot League) (1990–1998)
1990–91	Army	20–10	7–5	3rd	
1991–92	Army	17–12	10–4	T–3rd	
1992–93	Army	12–15	8–6	T–4th	
1993–94	Army	17–11	8–6	4th	
1994–95	Army	4–23	8–6	T–7th	
1995–96	Army	6–21	4–8	6th	
1996–97	Army	1–25	1–11	7th	
1997–98	Army	7–20	3–9	6th	
Army (Patriot):		84–136 (.382)	49–55 (.471)		
Total:		133–175 (.432)			
National champion Postseason invitational champion Conference regular season champion Conference regular season and conference tournament champion Division regular season champion Division regular season and conference tournament champion Conference tournament champion
