= Larry Meyer =

American businessperson

Larry Meyer is currently an Independent Director for a few retailers. He has been a consultant or in interim positions to companies including Forever 21 and FashionNova. His most recent position of CEO of UNIQLO USA, a division of Japanese conglomerate Fast Retailing ended in December 2016. Meyer joined UNIQLO as COO for the US in January 2013; he was previously executive vice president and chief financial officer at Forever 21. His work history includes Toys R Us and PepsiCo.
