= Jean-Michel Lemieux =

Computer scientist and former Chief Technology Officer of Shopify

- Education: B.S. in Computer Science from the University of Ottawa
- Occupations: Board member, advisor, and investor

Jean-Michel Lemieux is the former chief technology officer of Shopify.

== Education and career ==
Lemieux received a B.S. in Computer Science from the University of Ottawa.

Prior to becoming chief technology officer at Shopify, Lemieux was the Senior Vice President of Engineering after joining the company in 2015. Before working at Shopify, Lemieux was Vice President of Engineering at Atlassian and Chief Architect for Rational Team Concert. Lemieux holds two patents in the field of software configuration management and is the co-author of the book Eclipse Rich Client Platform.

In October 2019, Lemieux donated $100,100 to the fundraiser Team Trees, a collaborative initiative with the goal of raising $20 million by 2020 to plant 20 million trees.

In 2020, Lemieux created a COVID response fund in his home town of Ottawa to help local non-profits during the pandemic.

Lemieux is the owner and sole investor in Arlo, a Ottawa restaurant specializing in wine and refined food.

In 2026, Lemiuex joined Spellbook, a legal AI startup, as an executive individual contributor.

== Eclipse Rich Client Platform ==
Eclipse Rich Client Platform is a book about the rich client platform of the software Eclipse. The first edition of the book was published in 2005 and the second edition was published in 2010, both by Addison-Wesley Professional. The first edition was written by Jeff McAffer and Jean-Michel Lemieux, with the second edition being written by Jeff McAffer, Jean-Michel Lemieux, and Chris Aniszczyk. The book has received reviews from Today Software Magazine and Wayne Beaton, among others.

== Patents ==
- U.S. patent 8438541B2: "Software change management extension for uniformly handling artifacts with relaxed contraints"
- U.S. patent 20110161931A1: "Automated stream-based change flows within a software configuration management system"
