= Diana Lemieux =

American photographer

Diana Lemieux is a United States freelance photographer and has been the assistant to the President of the Lymphoma Research Foundation, a non-profit cancer organization in downtown Manhattan. She resides in Brooklyn, New York. Her photograph "Sometimes the Road Gets Rugged and It's Hard to Travel On" was first published in the December 2006/January 2007 issue of JPG Magazine. Most recently, the same photograph appeared in the June 2007 issue of Smithsonian Magazine. The photograph earned her a place as a finalist of the 4th Annual Smithsonian Magazine Photo Contest in the travel category and will be featured in an exhibit called "Through Our Reader's Eyes" at the Smithsonian in Washington DC from July 1 – August 15, 2007.

Lemieux is from Boston, Massachusetts. She graduated Northeastern University where she studied English.

== Notable works ==
- http://www.jpgmag.com/people/dlemieux
- https://web.archive.org/web/20070928043359/http://www.lightstalkers.org/dianalemieux
