= William F. Crittenden =

- Born: United States
- Occupations: Management scientist, academic and an author
- Spouse: Victoria Crittenden

Academic background
- Education: University of Michigan; Auburn University; University of Arkansas

Academic work
- Institutions: Northeastern University

William F. Crittenden is an American management scientist, academic and an author. He is a professor emeritus at the D'Amore-McKim School of Business at Northeastern University.

Crittenden was awarded the 2019 Teaching Innovation Award by the D'Amore-McKim School of Business at Northeastern University. His research has focused on dimensions of business strategy, planning, and implementation, as well as emerging themes in digitalization and global corporate citizenship. His authored works include publications in academic journals including Journal of the Academy of Marketing Science and Strategic Management Journal. He has also authored the workbook How to Develop the Strategic Plan and the book Direct Selling: A Global and Social Business Model.

== Education ==
Crittenden completed his B.A. in Economics from University of Michigan in 1976, followed by MBA from Auburn University in 1977. In 1982, he completed his Ph.D. in Management from the University of Arkansas.

== Career ==
Crittenden served as an instructor in the Department of Management at Murray State University from 1977 to 1978. Between 1978 and 1980, he was a graduate associate at the University of Arkansas. From 1981 to 1984, he held an appointment as an assistant professor in the Department of Management at Florida State University. Since 1984, he has been a professor at the D'Amore-McKim School of Business at Northeastern University.

At the College of Business Administration at Northeastern University, Crittenden was appointed associate dean for the Graduate Business Program from 1995 to 1997. He served as senior associate dean and dean of faculty at the College of Business Administration from 2006 to 2011.

== Research ==
In his early work, Crittenden examined planning and stakeholder satisfaction within religious organizations, demonstrating how selective use of planning elements could sustain stakeholder satisfaction and resource flow without necessitating a fully formalized planning process. He extended his focus to strategic management in nonprofit organizations.

Crittenden also contributed to understanding family-owned firms by introducing the concept of "founder centrality," emphasizing the founder's pivotal influence on strategic behavior and organizational values. This line of research highlighted how family dynamics shape business interactions and long-term strategies. Later, he applied social learning theory to cross-functional case education, advocating for an educational framework that enhances managerial capabilities through cognitive and behavioral interactions in structured learning environments. He also addressed the challenges of strategy implementation, framing it as a cornerstone of organizational capability and outlining levers to enhance implementation effectiveness.

While exploring market-oriented sustainability, Crittenden proposed a framework integrating sustainability with strategic marketing, identifying constructs like organizational DNA, stakeholder involvement, and performance management as drivers for achieving competitive advantage through sustainability. Later in his career, his research turned to the digital development, examining the role of information and communications technology (ICT) in empowering women micro-entrepreneurs in emerging economies. By extending the Technology Acceptance Model, he demonstrated how ICT influences self-efficacy, social capital, and empowerment. His examination of entrepreneurial influencers and influential entrepreneurs in the digital marketplace highlighted their distinct roles and impacts. His work established that while entrepreneurial influencers leverage external brands to build their following, influential entrepreneurs rely on the strength of their personal brands to drive ventures.

== Awards and honors ==
- 2016 - Fellow, Direct Selling Education Foundation
- 2018 - Best Empirical Paper Award, DSEF and the USASBE Minority and Women Entrepreneurship SIG

== Bibliography ==
=== Book ===
- Cochran, Sara L.; Coughlan, Anne T.; Crittenden, Victoria (2021). Direct Selling: A Global and Social Business Model. Business Expert Press. ISBN 978-1-63742-113-0.

=== Selected articles ===
- Hawes, Jon M.; Crittenden, William F. (July 1984). "A taxonomy of competitive retailing strategies". Strategic Management Journal. 5 (3): 275–287. doi:10.1002/smj.4250050307.
- Stone, Melissa M.; Bigelow, Barbara; Crittenden, William (July 1999). "Research on Strategic Management in Nonprofit Organizations: Synthesis, Analysis, and Future Directions". Administration & Society. 31 (3): 378–423. doi:10.1177/00953999922019184.
- Kelly, Louise M.; Athanassiou, Nicholas; Crittenden, William F. (December 2000). "Founder Centrality and Strategic Behavior in the Family-Owned Firm". Entrepreneurship Theory and Practice. 25 (2): 27–42. doi:10.1177/104225870002500202.
- Crittenden, Victoria L.; Crittenden, William F.; Ferrell, Linda K.; Ferrell, O. C.; Pinney, Christopher C. (February 2011). "Market-oriented sustainability: a conceptual framework and propositions". Journal of the Academy of Marketing Science. 39 (1): 71–85. doi:10.1007/s11747-010-0217-2.
- Crittenden, Victoria L.; Crittenden, William F. (July 2008). "Building a capable organization: The eight levers of strategy implementation". Business Horizons. 51 (4): 301–309. doi:10.1016/j.bushor.2008.02.003.
