= Elizabeth Yeampierre =

American attorney and environmental activist

- Born: New York City
- Education: Fordham University (BA); Northeastern University (JD)
- Occupation: Attorney
- Known for: Executive director of UPROSE

Elizabeth C. Yeampierre is an American attorney and environmental and climate justice leader. She is the executive director of UPROSE, Brooklyn's oldest Latino community-based organization.

== Early life and education ==
Yeampierre was born in New York City; growing up, her family lived in multiple different neighborhoods, including Manhattan's Upper West Side, Harlem, and the Bronx. Yeampierre recounts being raised in an "environmental justice community" and the impact it had on the health of her family: her father died from an asthma attack, her mother died from lung cancer, and Yeampierre herself suffered a pulmonary embolism. She cites a woman in her community checking on her children as they slept to ensure they were still breathing: "And I realized that, if we couldn’t breathe, we couldn’t fight for justice, that, literally, there wasn’t anything more fundamental than the right to breathe."

In 1980, Yeampierre graduated from Fordham University with a BA in political science. She earned her Juris Doctor from Northeastern University in 1983.

== Career ==
Yeampierre was the first Latina chair of the EPA's National Environmental Justice Advisory Council. In 2014, she helped lead the People's Climate March which took place in New York City.

She founded the NYC Climate Justice Youth Summit to help "young people of color understand the overlap between racial justice and climate change". She has also served as the dean of Puerto Rican student affairs at Yale University.

Yeampierre is currently the executive director of UPROSE, Brooklyn's oldest Latino community-based organization. In 2012, Hurricane Sandy caused extreme flooding in Sunset Park. In response, UPROSE began a community effort to prepare the area for the next disaster caused by the effects of climate change. In 2015, the New York City Economic Development Corporation started accepting proposals on how to develop empty space within the Sunset Park waterfront. Yeampierre was successful in pushing back against proposed commercial development, driven by concern that "her community could be left behind". The plan put forth by Yeampierre and UPROSE "will incentivize the local economy while putting [the community] on a path to resilience".

=== Climate justice advocacy ===
That is the history of extraction, of Puerto Rico being the oldest colony in the world, and the fact that things can be done in places where our people live that you can't do in other places. The fact that 23 Superfunds can be on this tiny, tiny, tiny island tells the story of extraction, abuse, toxic exposure, and how corporate American has treated disenfranchised communities.

— Elizabeth Yeampierre

PBS describes Yeampierre as a climate justice leader. Yeampierre cites Puerto Rico as the "poster child for climate injustice". She points to the flooding caused by Hurricane Maria in 2017, which disrupted multiple Superfund sites on the island, leading to contamination in the water, soil, and air. Yeampierre criticizes the practice of "disaster capitalism" and does not want corporations and organizations to follow a "come in and fix" approach; instead, she looks to the climate justice movement to provide "support that builds food sovereignty and systems that promote local, livable economies". UPROSE has helped to raise upwards of $800,000 for Puerto Rico, and has also provided solar-powered generators, water filters, and other equipment suitable for handling hazardous materials. In a talk given at UCLA in 2022, Yeampierre stressed that individual communities around the country are bearing the brunt of climate change, and they need to organize as a matter of survival.

== Awards and honors ==
- In 2015, Yeampierre was recognized as a Climate Warrior by Vogue
- In 2018, Yeampierre was awarded the Frederick Douglass Abolitionist Award FD200
- In 2022, Yeampierre was named as one of Apolitical's 100 Most Influential People in Climate Policy
- In 2023, Yeampierre was awarded the Dale Prize by the Cal Poly Pomona College of Environmental Design in recognition of her work as an environmental/climate justice leader
