= Souq (company) =

English-Arabic language e-commerce platform

Souq.com

- Screenshot
- Company type: Subsidiary
- Founded: October 25, 2005; 21 years ago
- Dissolved: September 1, 2021; 5 years ago
- Headquarters: Dubai, UAE
- Area served: Middle East
- Founder: Ronaldo Mouchawar
- Key people: Ronaldo Mouchawar (CEO); Asif Keshodia (Group CFO); Wisam Daoud (CTO/COO)
- Industry: Internet
- Services: E-commerce (online shopping)
- Employees: 3,000
- Parent: Maktoob (2005–2009); Jabbar Internet Group (2009–2017); Amazon (2017–2021)
- Website: www.souq.com

Souq.com was the largest e-commerce platform in the Arab world. The company launched in 2005 in Dubai, United Arab Emirates. On March 28, 2017, Amazon.com Inc. acquired Souq.com for $580 million as a subsidiary. Beginning in 2019, Amazon began rebranding Souq to Amazon, starting first with the United Arab Emirates's version of Souq becoming Amazon.ae. On June 17, 2020, Souq.com in Saudi Arabia became known as Amazon.sa, and on September 1, 2021, Souq.com in Egypt became known as Amazon.eg, marking the end of Souq.com.

== History ==
The website was founded in 2005 by Ronaldo Mouchawar and was originally a consumer-to-consumer auction site part of Maktoob Group. In 2010, Wisam (Sam) Daoud joined Souq from eBay as Chief Technology Officer and led the transformation of the business from auctions to a fixed price catalog based business similar to Amazon.com. In late 2012 Asif Keshodia joined as CFO on the heels of Souq's first major funding round led by Cape Town, South Africa-based Naspers and NYC hedge fund Tiger Global Management.

In March 2014, Naspers invested another $75 million in the company, bringing the total to $150 million that Souq.com had raised since its inception, the largest amount raised by any internet-based business in the Middle East.

The company was backed by Tiger Global Management and Naspers Ltd. as of 2015, among other companies, and headquartered in Dubai. In October 2015, it was reported that in a round of fundraising, the company was valued at around $1 billion. At the time, it had around 10 million visitors monthly in the 2nd place after Digikala with 51 million visitors monthly.

On March 27, 2017, Emaar Properties made an offer for Souq of $800 million. On March 28, 2017, Amazon.com Inc. confirmed it would be acquiring Souq.com for an unknown value. A source told The Wall Street Journal the deal was worth around $700 million, while the Financial Times reported that the deal was "understood to be worth more than $650m". The BBC also reported that Amazon might be paying about $650 million. The deal was expected to be completed later in 2017.

With the acquisition, Souq.com became a subsidiary of Amazon, acting as Amazon's arm into the Arab world. In May 2019, Souq.com UAE became Amazon.ae, and in September of the same year Amazon launched the Amazon DSP in the UAE. In June 2020, Souq.com KSA became amazon.sa. On September 1, 2021, Souq.com Egypt became amazon.eg, marking the end of Souq.com.

== Overview ==
As of March 2017, it sold over 8.4 million products in 31 categories, including "consumer electronics, fashion, health and beauty, household goods and baby." It also had around 45 million visits per month. It was the largest e-commerce platform in the Arab world in 2016, often described as the Amazon of the Middle East. As of 2014, the site delivered to the United Arab Emirates, Saudi Arabia, Kuwait, Egypt, Bahrain, Oman, and Qatar.

By March 2017, Souq.com had localized operations in Saudi Arabia, United Arab Emirates, and Egypt, which as of 2014 equated to semi-automated modern fulfillment centers in the United Arab Emirates, Saudi Arabia, Kuwait, and Egypt, measuring a total of 35,000 square meters. At the time the company had employed around 2,500 employees in engineering, retail, customer support, fulfillment, and last mile delivery sections.

As of September 1, 2021, Souq's online presence was completely replaced by Amazon when the last Souq.com site was replaced by Amazon.eg, the UAE and Saudi Arabian sites had previously been shutdown.

== Souq.com subsidiaries ==
As of January 2018, Souq.com subsidiaries include their delivery arm – QExpress, payment platform – Payfort which became Amazon Pay in Dec 2020, repair and service marketplace – Helpbit, and delivery marketplace Wing.

== See also ==
- Yahoo! Maktoob
- InFocus
- Jumia
