= Auroop Ratan Ganguly =

American scientist

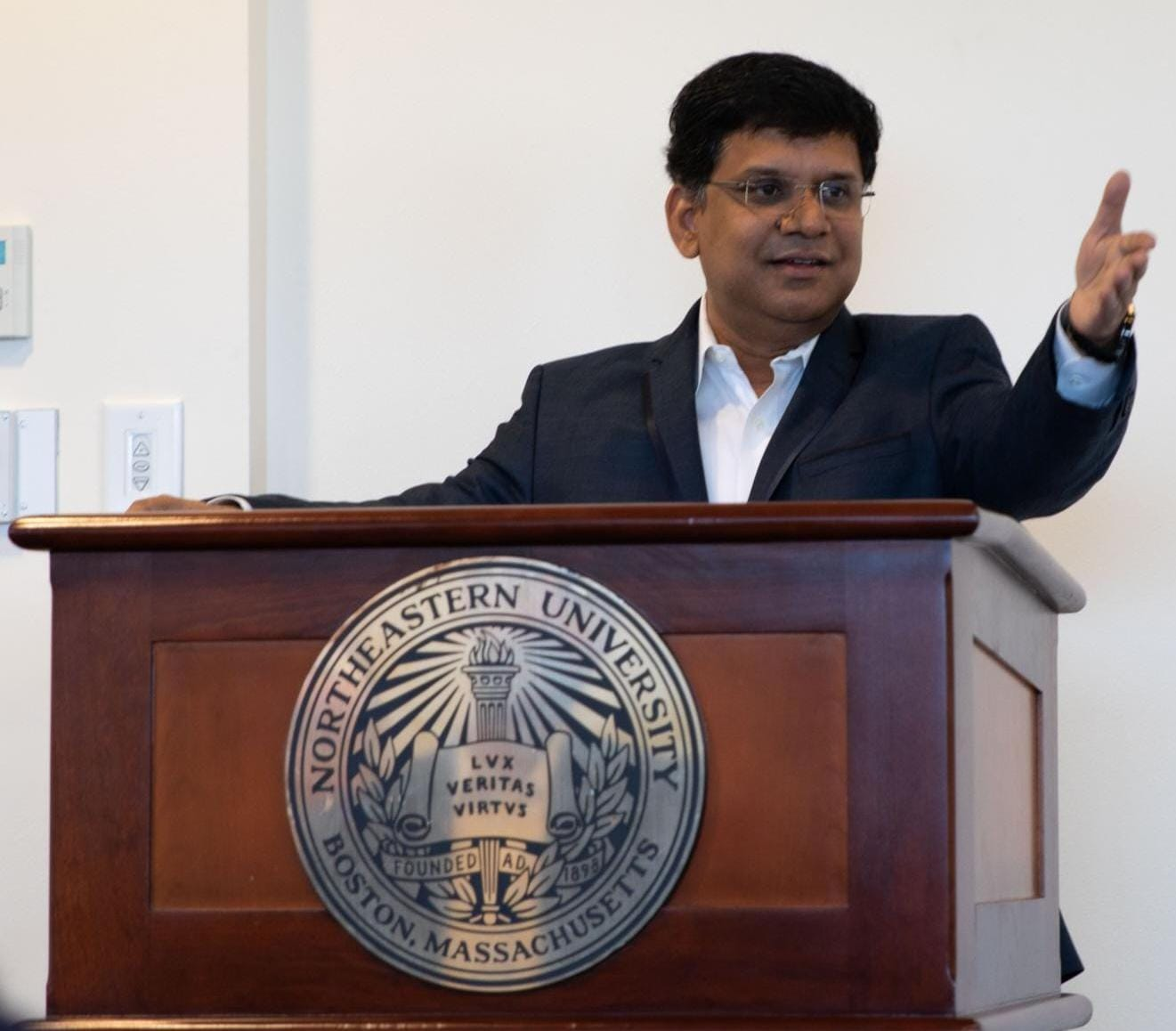
- Auroop Ratan Ganguly
- Born: Mathura, India
- Education: Massachusetts Institute of Technology; University of Toledo, Ohio; Indian Institute of Technology Kharagpur
- Awards: Fellow, American Society of Civil Engineers; Distinguished Member, Association for Computing Machinery; Named to the 2027 class of Fellows, American Meteorological Society
- Scientific career
- Fields: Climate extremes and water sustainability; Infrastructural resilience and homeland security; Artificial intelligence and nonlinear dynamics
- Workplaces: Northeastern University; Oak Ridge National Laboratory; Oracle Corporation
- Doctoral advisor: Rafael L. Bras

Auroop Ratan Ganguly is an American hydrologist, a climate and computational scientist, and a civil engineer of Indian origin best known for his work at the intersection of climate extremes and water sustainability, infrastructural resilience and homeland security, and artificial intelligence and nonlinear dynamics.

== Academics ==
Ganguly was born in Mathura, India to Shreemoti Deepali Ganguly (née Bhattacharya) and Shree Nirmal Kumar Ganguly. He completed his primary and secondary schooling from St. Xaviers School, Durgapur, and his higher secondary from Ramakrishna Mission Residential College, Narendrapur (now in Kolkata), both in West Bengal, India. He obtained his Bachelor of Technology in civil engineering from Indian Institute of Technology, Kharagpur (1993), a Master of Science in civil engineering from University of Toledo, Ohio (1997), and a PhD from the Civil and Environmental Engineering Department at the Massachusetts Institute of Technology, Cambridge, Massachusetts (2002).

== Professional work ==
Ganguly is a College of Engineering Distinguished Professor at Northeastern University (NU) in Boston, Massachusetts, where he has been on the faculty since 2011. He also holds a joint appointment as a chief scientist at the US Department of Energy's Pacific Northwest National Laboratory in Richland, Washington. He directs the Sustainability and Data Sciences Laboratory and AI for Climate and Sustainability (AI4CaS) within Northeastern's Institute for Experiential AI. He is a member of the Institute for Experiential AI's leadership and previously co-directed Northeastern's Global Resilience Institute.

He has held courtesy appointments in Northeastern's Khoury College of Computer Sciences and College of Social Sciences and Humanities. He is a distinguished visiting professor at IIT Bombay and a guest professor at IIT Gandhinagar, and previously held a visiting professorship at IIT Kharagpur.

Prior to his current position at Northeastern University in Boston, he was at the US Department of Energy's Oak Ridge National Laboratory for seven years in their Computational Sciences and Engineering Division, at Oracle Corporation for five years in their Time Series Database Kernel and Demand Forecasting E-business groups, and at a startup called Demantra Inc., a demand forecasting company subsequently acquired by Oracle, for a year. In addition, he held joint and visiting faculty positions at the University of Tennessee in Knoxville, Tennessee, and the University of South Florida in Tampa, Florida.

== Entrepreneurship ==
Ganguly co-founded risQ with Evan Kodra and Colin Sullivan and served as its chief scientific adviser. The Boston-based company developed climate-risk analytics for municipal bond markets and originated in Northeastern's Sustainability and Data Sciences Laboratory, with support from National Science Foundation grants. Intercontinental Exchange, which operates the New York Stock Exchange, announced its acquisition of risQ in December 2021.

Ganguly is also a co-founder of AIResQ Climsols, an IIT Gandhinagar-incubated company developing flood forecasting and transport-routing tools. Its co-founders include Udit Bhatia, Vivek Kapadia, Divya Upadhyay and Brijeshbhai Patel. As of September 2026, its platform was deployed in Gurugram and Changodar, with deployments in other locations under development. The company was invited to the 2026 India AI Impact Summit in New Delhi.

He advises Zeus AI, a weather-forecasting company co-founded by his former doctoral students Kate Duffy and Thomas Vandal. Zeus AI has received NASA Small Business Innovation Research support.

== Memberships ==
Ganguly is a fellow of the American Society of Civil Engineers, a distinguished member of the Association for Computing Machinery (class of 2023), and a senior member of the Institute of Electrical and Electronics Engineers. In July 2026, the American Meteorological Society named him to its class of 2027 Fellows.

He has served on a United Nations Environment Programme review panel and led the artificial intelligence section of the 2018 Sustained National Climate Assessment of the United States.

He is currently on the editorial board of Nature's Scientific Reports and PLOS One, a Member of the ASCE Technical Committee on Future Weather and Climate Risks, and the Specialty Chief Editor of the Water and Built Environment section of the journal Frontiers in Water. He was an Associate Editor of the ASCE Journal of Computing in Civil Engineering. He has previously served as an Associate Editor of the American Geophysical Union (AGU) journal Water Resources Research, on the AI committee of the American Meteorological Society (AMS), and as a co-chair of the Societal Dimensions Working Group at the National Center for Atmospheric Research (NCAR).

He led the temperature-extremes team for the Boston Research Advisory Group's 2016 Climate Ready Boston report. He also presented at a National Academies workshop on urban sustainability.

He was the 2026 Daffodil Lecturer at the University of Massachusetts Amherst and a speaker at the 2025 Marvin Zelen Memorial Symposium at the Harvard T. H. Chan School of Public Health.

== Research areas ==
Ganguly's research spans water and climate science, infrastructure resilience and security, machine learning, and nonlinear dynamics. He develops fundamental insights about weather extremes and water sustainability, innovative ways to reduce fragility of infrastructures, and new adaptations of data science. Research teams involving Ganguly have studied the intensification and spatial homogenization of coastal upwelling under climate change, persisting cold snaps under global warming, identified growing spatial variability of extreme rainfall during the Indian monsoon, translated scientific understanding of precipitation extremes under climate change to intensity-duration-frequency curves relevant for the design of hydraulic infrastructures, developed recovery strategies for damaged critical lifeline networks, compared methods to examine nonlinear relations among short and noisy data, developed hybrid physics and data science methods for weather and climate extremes, and developed machine learning and network science methods for representing and projecting complex space-time and graphical data. His research informs governments, companies, communities, and people in the broad area of climate adaptation and resilient engineering for urban sustainability and rural development with an emphasis on becoming resilient to changes and extreme events.

His research also includes the resilience of transport and resource-flow networks to flooding and other disruptions, and restoration and management of ecological networks. He has co-authored studies of Bayesian deep learning for uncertainty quantification, hybrid physics–AI precipitation nowcasting, and multiscale models of spreading processes on networks.

Other work examines internal climate variability and nonlinear dynamics, physical climate risk in municipal finance, sovereign debt and resilience investment, and equitable infrastructure policy.

Ganguly's research has been cited in United Nations and US assessment reports, highlighted in commentaries in scientific venues such as Nature, PNAS, NASA Tech Briefs, R&D Magazine, US Department of Energy (DOE), and National Science Foundation (NSF) news, while he and his work have been quoted by global media - including by the New York Times, Newsweek, and the Independent (UK) -in the articles on global warming, weather and hydrological disasters, and infrastructure and rebuilding. The startup he cofounded with his former PhD student has been highlighted by the Wall Street Journal.

Ganguly has been quoted in The Hindu on regional warming and heat-wave projections, in Science on limitations of climate-model downscaling and bias correction, and in Time on water security and the risks of attacks on desalination infrastructure. A Bloomberg Opinion column by Mark Gongloff, republished in the Taipei Times, discussed the climate-debt research co-authored by Ganguly.

== Books ==
- Critical Infrastructures Resilience, with Udit Bhatia and Stephen Flynn, Routledge, 2018
- Knowledge Discovery from Sensor Data, Auroop R. Ganguly, Joao Gama, Olufemi A. Omitaomu, Mohamed Gaber, Ranga Raju Vatsavai (editors), CRC Press, 2008

== Select publications ==
- Mishra, Aayushi; Arun, Advait; Kodra, Evan; Ganguly, Auroop R. (2026). "Fiscal discipline without physical resilience". Science. 394: 390–393. doi:10.1126/science.aeh3608.
- Mishra, Aayushi; Arun, Advait; Kodra, Evan; Smull, Erika; Woolcock, Owen; Doe, Tom; Marlowe, Justin; Ganguly, Auroop R. (2026). "Physical climate risk creates challenges and opportunities in US municipal finance". Nature Cities. 3: 11–21. doi:10.1038/s44284-025-00365-0.
- Salgado, Ariel; He, Yiyi; Radke, John; Ganguly, Auroop Ratan; Gonzalez, Marta C. (2024). "Dimension reduction approach for understanding resource-flow resilience to climate change". Communications Physics. 7 192. doi:10.1038/s42005-024-01664-z.
- Bhatia, Udit; Dubey, Sarth; Gouhier, Tarik C.; Ganguly, Auroop R. (2023). "Network-based restoration strategies maximize ecosystem recovery". Communications Biology. 6 1256. doi:10.1038/s42003-023-05622-3.
- Das, Puja; Posch, August; Barber, Nathan; Hicks, Michael; Duffy, Kate; Vandal, Thomas; Singh, Debjani; van Werkhoven, Katie; Ganguly, Auroop R. (2024). "Hybrid physics-AI outperforms numerical weather prediction for extreme precipitation nowcasting". npj Climate and Atmospheric Science. 7 282. arXiv:2407.11317. doi:10.1038/s41612-024-00834-8.
- Mukherjee, Orijeet; Zhou, Dongqin; Pal, Ashis; Watson, Jack; Gonzalez, Marta; Chatterjee, Samrat; Ganguly, Auroop R. (2026). "Resilience of urban metro rail networks globally guided by mesoscale and connectivity attributes". npj Sustainable Mobility and Transport. 3 31. doi:10.1038/s44333-026-00100-9.
- Wang, Daiwei; Gouhier, Tarik C.; Menge, Bruce A.; Ganguly, Auroop R. (2015). "Intensification and spatial homogenization of coastal upwelling under climate change". Nature. 518 (7539): 390–394. Bibcode:2015Natur.518..390W. doi:10.1038/nature14235. ISSN 0028-0836. PMID 25693571. S2CID 4470967.
- Liu, Yumin; Duffy, Kate; Dy, Jennifer G; Ganguly, Auroop R (2023). "Explainable deep learning for insights in El Niño and river flows". Nature Communications. 14 (1). Nature Publishing Group UK London: 339. Bibcode:2023NatCo..14..339L. doi:10.1038/s41467-023-35968-5. PMC 9860069. PMID 36670105.
- Duffy, Kate; Gouhier, Tarik C. (2022). "Climate-mediated shifts in temperature fluctuations promote extinction risk". Nature Climate Change. 12 (11): 1037–1044. arXiv:2202.12236. Bibcode:2022NatCC..12.1037D. doi:10.1038/s41558-022-01490-7.
- Ganguly, A. R.; Steinhaeuser, K.; Erickson, D. J.; Branstetter, M.; Parish, E. S.; Singh, N.; Drake, J. B.; Buja, L. (2009). "Higher trends but larger uncertainty and geographic variability in 21st century temperature and heat waves". Proceedings of the National Academy of Sciences. 106 (37): 15555–15559. Bibcode:2009PNAS..10615555G. doi:10.1073/pnas.0904495106. ISSN 0027-8424. PMC 2739867. PMID 19805213.
- Ghosh, Subimal; Das, Debasish; Kao, Shih-Chieh; Ganguly, Auroop R. (2011). "Lack of uniform trends but increasing spatial variability in observed Indian rainfall extremes". Nature Climate Change. 2 (2): 86–91. doi:10.1038/nclimate1327. ISSN 1758-678X.
- Khan, Shiraj; Bandyopadhyay, Sharba; Ganguly, Auroop R.; Saigal, Sunil; Erickson, David J.; Protopopescu, Vladimir; Ostrouchov, George (2007). "Relative performance of mutual information estimation methods for quantifying the dependence among short and noisy data". Physical Review E. 76 (2) 026209. Bibcode:2007PhRvE..76b6209K. doi:10.1103/PhysRevE.76.026209. hdl:2047/d20002073. ISSN 1539-3755. PMID 17930123.
- Bhatia, Udit; Kumar, Devashish; Kodra, Evan; Ganguly, Auroop R. (2015). "Network Science Based Quantification of Resilience Demonstrated on the Indian Railways Network". PLOS ONE. 10 (11) e0141890. arXiv:1508.03542. Bibcode:2015PLoSO..1041890B. doi:10.1371/journal.pone.0141890. ISSN 1932-6203. PMC 4633230. PMID 26536227.
- Vandal, Thomas; Kodra, Evan; Ganguly, Sangram; Michaelis, Andrew; Nemani, Ramakrishna; Ganguly, Auroop R. (2017). "DeepSD". Proceedings of the 23rd ACM SIGKDD International Conference on Knowledge Discovery and Data Mining. pp. 1663–1672. doi:10.1145/3097983.3098004. ISBN 978-1-4503-4887-4. S2CID 13205911.
