= Jonathan Kaufman =

American journalist (born 1956)

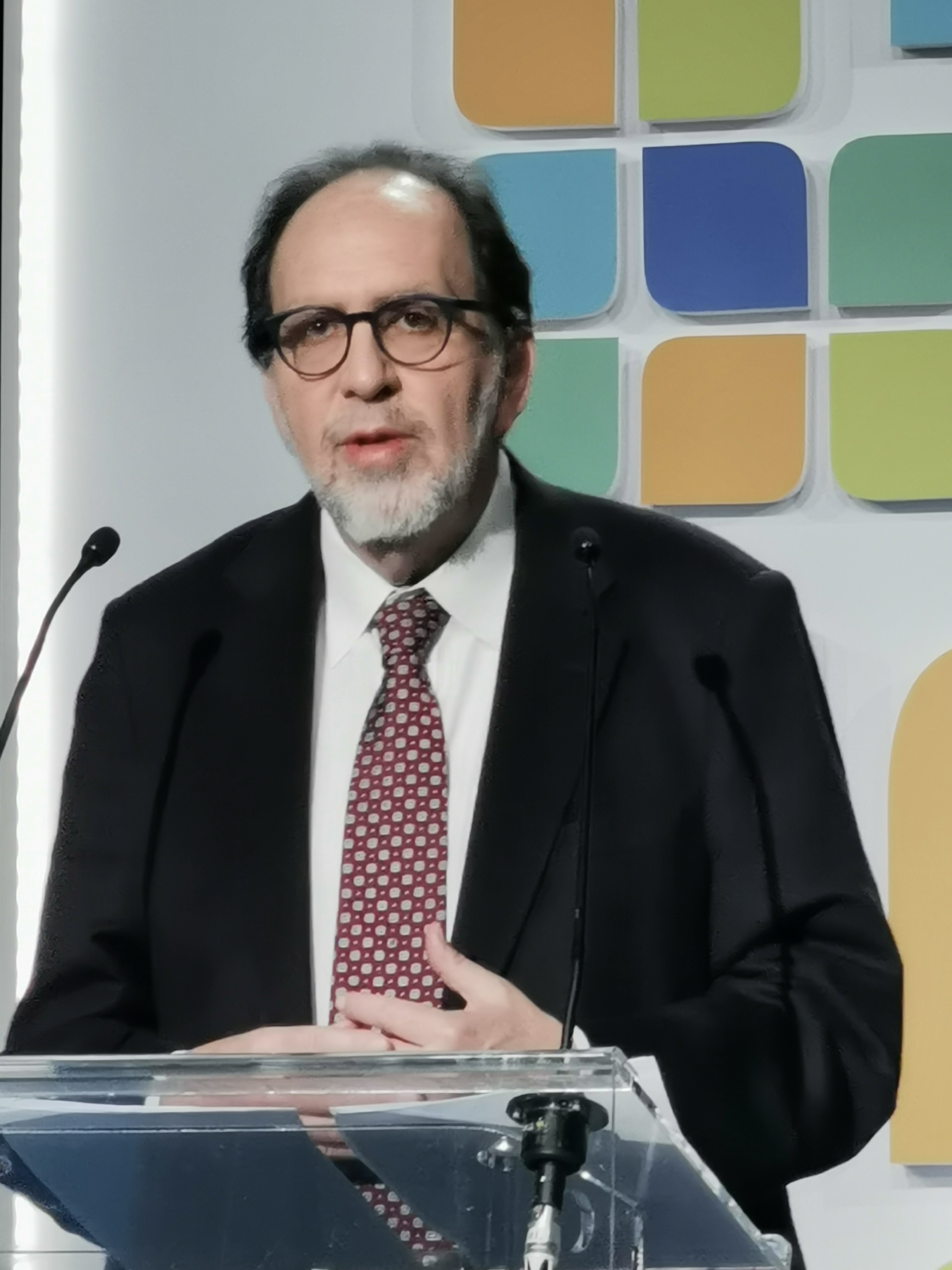

Journalist, Author, Professor at Northeastern University

Personal details
- Born: April 18, 1956 (age 70) New York City, U.S.
- Education: Yale College; Harvard University

Jonathan Kaufman (born April 18, 1956) is a Pulitzer Prize winning reporter, author, editor, Director of the Northeastern University School of Journalism, and professor of journalism.

== Career in journalism ==
Prior to joining Northeastern, Kaufman was an executive editor at Bloomberg News, where he oversaw more than 300 reporters and editors. During his tenure, Bloomberg journalists won several honors, including a 2015 Pulitzer Prize, multiple George Polk Awards, an Overseas Press Club Award, a Gerald Loeb Award, the Asia Society's Osborn Elliott Prize, and the Education Writers Association Grand Prize.

Kaufman previously served as a senior editor and Beijing bureau chief for The Wall Street Journal, and as a reporter and Berlin bureau chief for The Boston Globe. At the Globe, he was part of the reporting team that won a Pulitzer Prize for a series examining racism and job discrimination in Boston.

His areas of expertise include the role of Jews in American politics and around the world; 21st-century media challenges during the presidency of Donald Trump; race relations and class in the United States; and Chinese politics, econimics, and relations with the United States.

== Publications ==
- Broken Alliance: The Turbulent Times Between Blacks and Jews in America won the National Jewish Book Award. It was hailed by African-American and white reviewers as gripping, insightful and fair and is still used widely in college classrooms.
- A Hole in the Heart of the World: Being Jewish in Eastern Europe was a finalist for the National Jewish Book Award. Reviews called it “deeply engrossing,” and “beautifully written.”
- The Last Kings of Shanghai. Two Rival Dynasties and the Creation of Modern China (Little Brown, 2020, ISBN 978-1-4087-1004-3).
- When America Roared: How the 1980s Saved, Then Broke, the Country-and Led Us to Today (Viking, 2026, ISBN 978-0-5933-0020-6)

== Honors and awards ==
- Pulitzer Prize for Special Local Reporting, 1984, for a series in The Boston Globe on racism and job discrimination in Boston.
- Pulitzer Prize Finalist for Local Reporting, 1985, for a series in The Boston Globe on neighborhood activists in Boston.
- National Jewish Book Award for Broken Alliance, 1989.
- National Headliner Award, 1997, for a series in The Wall Street Journal on the changing nature of work and worker's lives.
- Unity in Media Award, 1999, for articles in the Wall Street Journal on the impact of incarceration on black families.
- American Jewish Committee Present Tense Award for Best Book on Current Affairs for Broken Alliance, 1989.
- Finalist, National Jewish Book Award for A Hole in the Heart of the World, 1997.
- Columbia University School of Journalism School Award for Coverage of Race and Ethnicity, 2008, for a portfolio of stories on how race and gender have impacted the presidential primary races.
- Columbia University School of Journalism School Award for Coverage of Race and Ethnicity, 1999, for articles in the Wall Street Journal on the impact of incarceration on black families.
- Pulitzer Prize for Explanatory Journalism, 2015, for a Bloomberg News series on corporate tax dodging.
- Asia Society/Osborn Elliott Award for Coverage of Asia, 2015, for a Bloomberg series on companies in India killing villagers and others through pollution and environmental abuse.
- Gerald Loeb Award, George Polk Award, and Pulitzer Prize Finalist for Public Service, 2011, for a Bloomberg series on financial abuses by for-profit colleges.
- Overseas Press Club Award, 2011, for a Bloomberg Businessweek story on Chinese students gaming the SATs to gain admittance to American colleges.
- George Polk Award, 2012, for a Bloomberg series on abuses in the student loan industry.
