= Meredith Garniss =

American visual artist and landscape painter

Meredith Garniss (born 1967) is an American visual artist and landscape painter. She is the founder of the Willoughby and Baltic gallery.

She graduated from Northeastern University, Boston in 1989 with a B.S. in Art. She followed a career in art and publishing technology, and is the administrator for the Boston Dorkbot group. She aims to integrate technology into traditional art forms, and in 2006 created the String Theory Marionette Theater, which combines robotics with traditional Czech marionettes.

Garniss is the founder of the Willoughby and Baltic gallery in Somerville, Massachusetts. She modified the gallery from a former cinderblock garage to create an "old world" atmosphere. Most of the renovation was done using standard hand tools.

She paints landscapes using a medium of oil paints and cold wax. The landscapes are not based on a specific locations, but derive from colors of New England, Scotland and Ireland.

Garniss lives in Somerville, Massachusetts.
