= Jerome F. Hajjar =

American civil engineer

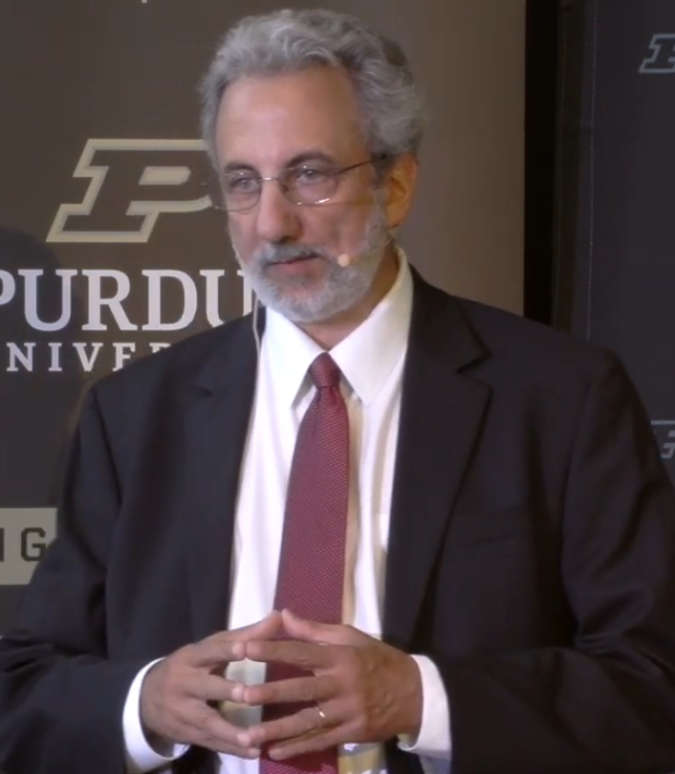
- Hajjar in 2025
- Education: Yale University; Cornell University
- Occupation: Civil engineer

Jerome F. Hajjar is an American civil engineer. He is a university distinguished professor in the department of civil and environmental engineering at Northeastern University.

In 2022, Hajjar was elected as a member of the National Academy of Engineering.
