= Saja Kamal =

Saudi Arabian footballer

Personal information
- Date of birth: 1989 or 1990 (age 36–37)
- Place of birth: England

Saja Kamal (Arabic: سجى كمال) is a Saudi Arabian former footballer.

== Early life and education ==
Kamal was born to a Palestinian mother and Saudi Arabian father. She grew up in Eastern Province, Saudi Arabia. Kamal started playing football at the age of four.

Kamal attended Northeastern University in the United States.

== Career ==
Kamal represented Saudi Arabia internationally at the USA Cup. She broke a Guinness World Record for the highest altitude football match, which she played at Mount Kilimanjaro.
