= Maktoob =

Email service provider in Middle East and North Africa

- Logo used from 2009 to 2013
- Company type: Private company
- Industry: Internet services
- Founded: 1998
- Defunct: 31 January 2023
- Headquarters: Dubai, United Arab Emirates
- Key people: Ahmed Nassef, MD/VP, Yahoo! Middle East
- Website: maktoob.com

Maktoob (Arabic: مكتوب, lit. 'written') was an online services company founded in Amman, Jordan. Maktoob.com was known as the first Arabic–English email service provider. In 2009, Yahoo! acquired Maktoob.com, making it Yahoo!'s official arm in the MENA region. As of 31 January 2023, Yahoo! Maktoob has been shut down; and therefore no longer publishes content.

Yahoo! Maktoob provided the following online services: News (Yahoo! Maktoob News), sports news (Yahoo! Maktoob Sport), a blogging platform (Yahoo! Maktoob Blog), a social network (Yahoo! Maktoob As7ab Maktoob), a bilingual online research community (Yahoo! Maktoob Research), a marriage portal (Yahoo! Maktoob Bentelhalal), a travel portal (Yahoo! Maktoob Travel) and a casual gaming platform (Yahoo! Maktoob Games).

== History ==
=== Early days ===
Maktoob was founded in 1999 by Samih Toukan and Hussam Khoury, offering a webmail service featuring Arabic language support—a unique feature at the time when other free email services lacked such capability. They facilitated users without Arabic keyboards or browsers supporting Arabic script to send and receive emails.

=== Abraaj Capital acquisition ===
In June 2005, the UAE-based private equity house Abraaj Capital purchased 40% of the company shares in a $5 million deal.

In April 2006, Maktoob acquired 80% of the popular Arab sports website Sport4ever.com.

In December 2007, Abraaj sold its share to Tiger Global Management.

=== Yahoo! acquisition ===
In 2009, Maktoob was sold to Yahoo! for $164 million. In January 2011, email users were migrated from the @maktoob.com domain to the @yahoo.com domain.

In October 2014, Yahoo! announced its intention to let go half of its staff in Dubai, some immediately, others three months later. Then it announced in December 2015 the closure of its office in Dubai, its last office in the MENA region. The move was an attempt to "streamline" Yahoo's international operations.
