= 1982–83 Wisconsin Badgers men's ice hockey season =

American college ice hockey season

National champion WCHA tournament, champion NCAA tournament, champion
- Conference: 3rd WCHA
- Home ice: Dane County Coliseum

Record
- Overall: 33–10–4
- Conference: 15–9–2
- Home: 20–4–1
- Road: 11–6–3
- Neutral: 2–0–0

Coaches and captains
- Head coach: Jeff Sauer
- Assistant coaches: Grant Standbrook
- Captain: Bruce Driver

The 1982–83 Wisconsin Badgers men's ice hockey team represented the University of Wisconsin–Madison in college ice hockey. In its first year under head coach Jeff Sauer, the team compiled a 33–10–2 record. The Badgers won the 1983 national championship, their fourth title.

== Season ==
=== Early season trouble ===
After finishing as the runner up the year before, head coach Bob Johnson left to become the bench boss of the Calgary Flames. He was replaced by former assistant and long-time Colorado College coach Jeff Sauer. The team was very experienced, having made the national championship game in each of the previous two seasons, but early on the squad appeared to have a rough time adjusting to their new coach's style. The team took 3 out of a possible 4 points against eventual CCHA champion Bowling Green in their season opener but the following weekend, back at home, they could only manage a split with Dalhousie. When they opened their conference schedule at the end of October the team couldn't win either contest against Minnesota, leaving the Badgers with a mediocre 2–2–2 record. The following weekend Wisconsin welcomed their coach's former team to Madison and won three games over four days to vastly improve their conference standing. UW held firm with a home split against the Golden Gophers then lost a road series at North Dakota to drop their WCHA record back to .500.

=== Winning streak ===
Wisconsin returned closer to home in late November to face a terrible Illinois–Chicago team and needed overtime to pull out a win. After such a poor performance the team collected itself and game out firing two days later against Air Force, dominating the Falcons in one of the most lopsided series in team history (The Badgers outscored Air Force 27–1 in the two games). After the offensive outburst the Badgers relaxed a bit and were beaten at home by Minnesota–Duluth before salvaging a split in the second game. The win in Duluth was a turning point for the Badgers, who later admitted it was the first time where they really listened to their new coach. With their first win in December, Wisconsin began a stretch of 11 consecutive victories, the first seven coming at home followed by a further 4 in Colorado before CC stopped their streak. When it was over the Badgers were in the thick of the race for the WCHA title and, with 20 wins already, had a good chance at a berth in the NCAA tournament regardless of the WCHA tournament.

=== Stumbling down the stretch ===
Unfortunately, after losing to Colorado College, Wisconsin faced defending national champion North Dakota and the Fighting Sioux got the better of them again, taking 3 of 4 points and putting UND up in the conference standings by 3. After managing a split with Duluth the week after Wisconsin found themselves 5 points behind both UND and Minnesota with only 4 games remaining but when the Gophers swept the Fighting Sioux the following weekend the Badgers' two wins over Denver put them just behind North Dakota for a first round bye. Wisconsin needed to win against Minnesota and get help from Duluth, both of which happened on the last Friday of the regular season, but the Golden Gophers recovered for a split and Wisconsin watched second place slip away when North Dakota won their season finale.

=== WCHA tournament ===
With their 3rd-place finish the Badgers were forced to play in the first round of the conference tournament but fortunately they faced the 6–26–1 CC Tigers. The series was closer than may have been expected but Wisconsin won in the end and advanced to face a rested North Dakota in the Semifinals. Despite not having won any of the previous 5 games, Wisconsin was not fazed by UND's run to repeat as champion and the two teams fought to a 1–1 deadlock in game one. No overtime was used because the two-game series was decided on aggregate but the two squads battled in another defensive contest until North Dakota scored twice early in the third. The Badgers rallied from being down by two twice but still found themselves behind with just seconds to play. With Marc Behrend on the bench future Hall of Famer Chris Chelios scored the tying goal with 12 seconds to play and sending the game into overtime. The first two extra periods passed without a goal being scored but just 62 seconds into the third overtime Ted Pearson notched the game-winner. While Wisconsin celebrated the referees checked the length of Pearson's stick and ruled it illegal. As a result, the goal was waved off and Pearson was given a 2-minute penalty. With both teams exhausted the game didn't last much longer but, surprisingly, North Dakota allowed the first short-handed goal against all season when Paul Houck scored just 26 seconds into the power-play.

With an NCAA berth all but ensured, Wisconsin headed to Minneapolis to take on the WCHA Champion and swept Minnesota to win their second consecutive WCHA championship, the seventh in team history.

=== NCAA tournament ===
Wisconsin was given the top western seed and were slotted to face St. Lawrence who were making their first tournament appearance in over 20 years. The veteran Badgers overwhelmed the Saints, beating the ECAC team soundly in both games to take the series 13–3, the largest margin of victory in any NCAA aggregate series. In the National Semifinal Wisconsin faced a tougher opponent in Providence but were still miles ahead with Behrend being called on to make only 17 saves in the 2–0 shutout.

Wisconsin made their 3rd consecutive championship game, the fifth time in history a team was able to accomplish that feat, but the only time a program did so with two different head coaches. They also faced their third different opponent, this time in the form of Harvard who were in their first championship game after 7 previous trips to the Frozen Four. The badgers jumped out to an early lead, just 7 minutes into the contest, while Behrend held the fort and kept the Crimson scoreless. Patrick Flatley's second goal came with 4 minutes left in the second to build a 2-goal lead and just under seven minutes of game-time later Wisconsin was up by 3. Harvard finally managed to score mid-way through the final frame but each of their two goals were answered by the Badgers and John Johannson empty-net goal sealed the victory for the Badgers.

=== Awards and honors ===
In allowing just 5 goals in the 4 games, Marc Behrend was awarded the Tournament MOP for the second time. He became just the second player to be honored twice and the only one to win on both occasions (Lou Angotti is the only other multiple-time winner as of 2019). Wisconsin played 4 players on the All-Tournament Team with Behrend joined by Chris Chelios, Patrick Flatley and Paul Houck. Behrend finished second in the nation with a 2.23 GAA and was tops with a .921 winning percentage but neither mark was good enough to get him named to the All-American West Team. The only Bader All-American was Flatley who was also the only First Team All-WCHA player. though Chelios, Houck and Bruce Driver made the second team. Jeff Sauer became the first person to win a championship in his inaugural season as head coach with a new team and was later joined by Brad Berry in 2016. The Badgers finished the tournament with a +16 goal differential, tying the mark held jointly by 1950 Colorado College and 1953 Michigan.

== Standings ==
1982–83 Western Collegiate Hockey Association standings
	Conference							Overall					
	GP	W	L	T	PTS	GF	GA	GP	W	L	T	GF	GA
Minnesota†	26	18	7	1	37	148	101	46	33	12	1	253	155
North Dakota	26	16	9	1	33	115	71	36	21	13	2	158	100
Wisconsin*	26	15	9	2	32	118	85	47	33	10	4	233	131
Minnesota-Duluth	26	14	12	0	28	103	95	45	28	16	1	193	158
Denver	26	11	15	0	22	120	146	37	15	22	0	177	207
Colorado College	26	2	24	0	4	78	184	35	6	28	1	126	227
Championship: Wisconsin † indicates conference regular season champion * indicates conference tournament champion

=== Schedule ===
Date	Opponent^{#}	Rank^{#}	Site	Result	Record
Exhibition
October 8	vs. Michigan Tech*		Dane County Coliseum • Madison, Wisconsin (Exhibition)	W 6–3	
Regular Season
October 15	at Bowling Green*		BGSU Ice Arena • Bowling Green, Ohio	W 4–3	1–0
October 16	at Bowling Green*		BGSU Ice Arena • Bowling Green, Ohio	T 4–4 ^{OT}	1–0–1
October 22	vs. Dalhousie*		Dane County Coliseum • Madison, Wisconsin	L 2–4	1–1–1
October 23	vs. Dalhousie*		Dane County Coliseum • Madison, Wisconsin	W 13–4	2–1–1
October 29	at Minnesota		Williams Arena • Minneapolis, Minnesota	T 4–4 ^{OT}	2–1–2 (0–0–1)
October 30	at Minnesota		Williams Arena • Minneapolis, Minnesota	L 8–9	2–2–2 (0–1–1)
November 3	vs. Colorado College		Dane County Coliseum • Madison, Wisconsin	W 7–4	3–2–2 (1–1–1)
November 5	vs. Colorado College		Dane County Coliseum • Madison, Wisconsin	W 9–1	4–2–2 (2–1–1)
November 6	vs. Colorado College		Dane County Coliseum • Madison, Wisconsin	W 5–1	5–2–2 (3–1–1)
November 12	vs. Minnesota		Dane County Coliseum • Madison, Wisconsin	W 4–3	6–2–2 (4–1–1)
November 13	vs. Minnesota		Dane County Coliseum • Madison, Wisconsin	L 1–5	6–3–2 (4–2–1)
November 19	at North Dakota		Winter Sports Center • Grand Forks, North Dakota	L 2–6	6–4–2 (4–3–1)
November 20	at North Dakota		Winter Sports Center • Grand Forks, North Dakota	L 0–4	6–5–2 (4–4–1)
November 24	at Illinois–Chicago*		UIC Pavilion • Chicago, Illinois	W 3–2 ^{OT}	7–5–2 (4–4–1)
November 26	vs. Air Force*		Dane County Coliseum • Madison, Wisconsin	W 13–1	8–5–2 (4–4–1)
November 27	vs. Air Force*		Dane County Coliseum • Madison, Wisconsin	W 14–0	9–5–2 (4–4–1)
December 3	vs. Minnesota–Duluth		Dane County Coliseum • Madison, Wisconsin	L 3–5	9–6–2 (4–5–1)
December 4	vs. Minnesota–Duluth		Dane County Coliseum • Madison, Wisconsin	W 7–2	10–6–2 (5–5–1)
December 10	vs. US National Team		Dane County Coliseum • Madison, Wisconsin (Exhibition)	W 6–4	10–6–2 (5–5–1)
December 29	vs. Lake Superior State*		Dane County Coliseum • Madison, Wisconsin	W 7–5	11–6–2 (5–5–1)
December 30	vs. Lake Superior State*		Dane County Coliseum • Madison, Wisconsin	W 4–3	12–6–2 (5–5–1)
January 2	vs. Boston University*		Dane County Coliseum • Madison, Wisconsin	W 2–0	13–6–2 (5–5–1)
January 3	vs. Boston University*		Dane County Coliseum • Madison, Wisconsin	W 5–2	14–6–2 (5–5–1)
January 7	vs. Minnesota–Duluth		Dane County Coliseum • Madison, Wisconsin	W 7–4	15–6–2 (6–5–1)
January 8	vs. Minnesota–Duluth		Dane County Coliseum • Madison, Wisconsin	W 6–2	16–6–2 (7–5–1)
January 14	at Denver		DU Arena • Denver, Colorado	W 8–0	17–6–2 (8–5–1)
January 15	at Denver		DU Arena • Denver, Colorado	W 8–4	18–6–2 (9–5–1)
January 19	at Colorado College		Broadmoor World Arena • Colorado Springs, Colorado	W 4–1	19–6–2 (10–5–1)
January 21	at Colorado College		Broadmoor World Arena • Colorado Springs, Colorado	W 8–3	20–6–2 (11–5–1)
January 22	at Colorado College		Broadmoor World Arena • Colorado Springs, Colorado	L 1–3	20–7–2 (11–6–1)
January 28	vs. North Dakota		Dane County Coliseum • Madison, Wisconsin	T 2–2 ^{OT}	20–7–3 (11–6–2)
January 29	vs. North Dakota		Dane County Coliseum • Madison, Wisconsin	L 1–3	20–8–3 (11–7–2)
February 4	at Minnesota–Duluth		Duluth Arena Auditorium • Duluth, Minnesota	L 3–6	20–9–3 (11–8–2)
February 5	at Minnesota–Duluth		Duluth Arena Auditorium • Duluth, Minnesota	W 3–1	21–9–3 (12–8–2)
February 11	vs. Denver		Dane County Coliseum • Madison, Wisconsin	W 4–1	22–9–3 (13–8–2)
February 12	vs. Denver		Dane County Coliseum • Madison, Wisconsin	W 5–3	23–9–3 (14–8–2)
February 18	at Minnesota		Williams Arena • Minneapolis, Minnesota	W 7–3	24–9–3 (15–8–2)
February 19	at Minnesota		Williams Arena • Minneapolis, Minnesota	L 1–5	24–10–3 (15–9–2)
WCHA tournament
February 25	vs. Colorado College*		Dane County Coliseum • Madison, Wisconsin (WCHA First Round game 1)	W 3–2	25–10–3 (15–9–2)
February 26	vs. Colorado College*		Dane County Coliseum • Madison, Wisconsin (WCHA First Round game 2)	W 5–2	26–10–3 (15–9–2)
Wisconsin Wins Series 8-4
March 4	at North Dakota*		Winter Sports Center • Grand Forks, North Dakota (WCHA Semifinal game 1)	T 1–1	26–10–4 (15–9–2)
March 5	at North Dakota*		Winter Sports Center • Grand Forks, North Dakota (WCHA Semifinal game 2)	W 6–5 ^{3OT}	27–10–4 (15–9–2)
Wisconsin Wins Series 7-6
March 12	at Minnesota*		Williams Arena • Minneapolis, Minnesota (WCHA championship game 1)	W 5–1	28–10–4 (15–9–2)
March 13	at Minnesota*		Williams Arena • Minneapolis, Minnesota (WCHA championship game 2)	W 3–2	29–10–4 (15–9–2)
Wisconsin Wins Series 8-3
NCAA tournament
March 19	vs. St. Lawrence*		Dane County Coliseum • Madison, Wisconsin (National Quarterfinal game 1)	W 6–2	30–10–4 (15–9–2)
March 20	vs. St. Lawrence*		Dane County Coliseum • Madison, Wisconsin (National Quarterfinal game 2)	W 7–1	31–10–4 (15–9–2)
Wisconsin Wins Series 13-3
March 24	vs. Providence*		Winter Sports Center • Grand Forks, North Dakota (National Semifinal)	W 2–0	32–10–4 (15–9–2)
March 26	vs. Harvard*		Winter Sports Center • Grand Forks, North Dakota (National championship)	W 6–2	33–10–4 (15–9–2)
*Non-conference game. ^{#}Rankings from USCHO.com Poll. Source:

== Roster and scoring statistics ==
No.	Name	Year	Position	Hometown	S/P/C	Games	Goals	Assists	Pts	PIM
16	Paul Houck	Sophomore	RW	Vancouver, BC	(British Columbia)	47	38	33	71	36
26	Patrick Flatley	Sophomore	RW	Toronto, ON	(Ontario)	43	25	44	69	76
12	John Johannson	Junior	C	Rochester, MN	(Minnesota)	47	22	41	63	68
25	Bruce Driver	Junior	D	Toronto, ON	(Ontario)	39	16	34	50	50
28	Paul Houston	Sophomore	W	Toronto, ON	(Ontario)	46	21	27	48	44
21	Chris Chelios	Sophomore	D	Chicago, IL	(Illinois)	45	16	32	48	62
20	David Maley	Freshman	LW	Beaver Dam, WI	(Wisconsin)	47	17	23	40	24
7	Todd Lecy	Senior	LW	Rochester, MN	(Minnesota)	40	16	18	34	53
23	Scott Sabo	Junior	C	Thief River Falls, MN	(Minnesota)	47	10	22	32	54
4	Pat Ethier	Senior	D	Saint Paul, MN	(Minnesota)	47	7	20	27	84
11	Jim Johannson	Freshman	C	Rochester, MN	(Minnesota)	45	12	9	21	16
17	Marty Wiitala	Freshman	C	Superior, WI	(Wisconsin)	46	10	8	18	8
19	Ted Pearson	Senior	W	Edina, MN	(Minnesota)	42	6	9	15	90
29	Tim Thomas	Sophomore	D	Richfield, MN	(Minnesota)	23	7	7	14	31
2	Jan-Åke Danielson	Sophomore	D	Insjön, SWE	(Sweden)	36	0	10	10	16
6	Jeff Andringa	Senior	D	Madison, WI	(Wisconsin)	47	2	6	8	12
14	Matt Walsh	Freshman	D	Madison, WI	(Wisconsin)	45	0	7	7	30
8	Ernie Vargas	Freshman	RW	Saint Paul, MN	(Minnesota)	37	2	4	6	32
13	Tom Carroll	Senior	W	Edina, MN	(Minnesota)	27	2	2	4	10
18	Steve Tschipper	Freshman	C	Thornhill, ON	(Ontario)	8	1	2	3	0
33	Tim Sager	Junior	W	Saint Paul, MN	(Minnesota)	12	1	2	3	8
24	Eric Faust	Freshman	D	Toronto, ON	(Ontario)	11	1	1	2	2
1	Terry Kleisinger	Junior	G	Nanaimo, BC	(British Columbia)	19	0	2	2	16
10	Mark Edwards	Sophomore	C	Beloit, WI	(Wisconsin)	2	0	0	0	0
22	Tom Ryan	Freshman	W	Madison, WI	(Wisconsin)	6	0	0	0	0
10	Jacques De St. Phalle	Senior	RW	Philadelphia, PA	(Pennsylvania)	7	0	0	0	0
30	Gary Baxter	Freshman	G	Don Mills, ON	(Ontario)	10	0	0	0	0
31	Marc Behrend	Junior	G	Madison, WI	(Wisconsin)	23	0	0	0	0
	Bench					47	0	0	0	14
Total							233	365	598	884

== Goaltending statistics ==
No.	Name	Games	Minutes	Wins	Losses	Ties	Goals Against	Saves	Shut Outs	SV %	GAA
31	Marc Behrend	23	1315	17	1	1	49	562	2	0.920	2.23
1	Terry Kleisinger	19	1021	11	6	1	48	403	3	0.893	2.82
30	Gary Baxter	10	545	5	3	2	33	230	0	0.875	3.63
Total		47	2820	33	10	4	131	1195	4	.902	2.79

== 1983 national championship game ==
=== (E1) Harvard vs. (W1) Wisconsin ===
March 26	Harvard	2 – 6	Wisconsin	Winter Sports Center

Scoring summary
Period	Team	Goal	Assist(s)	Time	Score
1st	WIS	Patrick Flatley – PP	Houck and Driver	7:03	1–0 WIS
2nd	WIS	Patrick Flatley	Houston and Maley	36:09	2–0 WIS
3rd	WIS	Paul Houston – GW	Maley and Flatley	43:00	3–0 WIS
3rd	HAR	Scott Fusco	Sheehy and Kukulowicz	48:54	3–1 WIS
3rd	WIS	Bruce Driver	Sabo and Wiitala	51:35	4–1 WIS
3rd	HAR	Shayne Kukulowicz	Sheehy	52:22	4–2 WIS
3rd	WIS	Paul Houston – PP	Driver and Maley	58:39	5–2 WIS
3rd	WIS	John Johannson – SH EN	Behrend	59:21	6–2 WIS
Penalty summary
Period	Team	Player	Penalty	Time	PIM
1st	HAR	Dave Connors	Tripping	6:29	2:00
1st	WIS	Paul Houck	Tripping	11:01	2:00
1st	WIS	Marty Wiitala	Holding	17:38	2:00
1st	HAR	Shayne Kukulowicz	High Sticking	18:19	2:00
2nd	HAR	Mark Fusco	Roughing	30:12	2:00
2nd	WIS	Jim Johannson	Roughing	30:12	2:00
2nd	HAR	Scott Fusco	Hooking	30:53	2:00
2nd	WIS	Jan–Ake Danielson	High Sticking	36:50	2:00
2nd	HAR	Phil Falcone	Hooking	40:00	2:00
3rd	HAR	Grant Blair	Slashing	43:42	2:00
3rd	HAR	Shayne Kukulowicz	Slashing	58:12	2:00
3rd	WIS	Tim Sager	Hooking	59:01	2:00

Shots by period
Team	1	2	3	T
Wisconsin	14	10	13	37
Harvard	9	10	7	26

Goaltenders
Team	Name	Saves	Goals against	Time on ice
WIS	Marc Behrend	24	2	
HAR	Grant Blair	31	5	

== Players drafted into the NHL ==
=== 1983 NHL entry draft ===
No Wisconsin players were selected in the NHL draft.

== See also ==
- 1983 NCAA Division I Men's Ice Hockey Tournament
- List of NCAA Division I Men's Ice Hockey Tournament champions
