= 1983 NCAA Division I men's ice hockey tournament =

- Teams: 8
- Finals site: Winter Sports Center, Grand Forks, North Dakota
- Champions: Wisconsin Badgers (4th title)
- Runner-up: Harvard Crimson (1st title game)
- Semifinalists: Providence Friars (2nd Frozen Four); Minnesota Golden Gophers (10th Frozen Four)
- Winning coach: Jeff Sauer (1st title)
- MOP: Marc Behrend (Wisconsin)

The 1983 NCAA Division I Men's Ice Hockey Tournament was the culmination of the 1982–83 NCAA Division I men's ice hockey season, the 36th such tournament in NCAA history. It was held between March 18 and 26, 1983, and concluded with Wisconsin defeating Harvard 6-2. All Quarterfinals matchups were held at home team venues while all succeeding games were played at the Winter Sports Center in Grand Forks, North Dakota.

The Badgers' goal differential (+16) is a record for an NCAA tournament, equaling the record set by Colorado College in 1950 and matched by Michigan in 1953.

== Qualifying teams ==
The NCAA permitted 8 teams to qualify for the tournament and divided its qualifiers into two regions (East and West). Each of the tournament champions from the three Division I conferences (CCHA, ECAC and WCHA) received automatic invitations into the tournament with At-large bids making up the remaining 5 teams, an additional 2 western and 3 eastern schools.

East							West						
Seed	School	Conference	Record	Berth type	Appearance	Last bid	Seed	School	Conference	Record	Berth type	Appearance	Last bid
1	Harvard	ECAC Hockey	21–8–1	Tournament champion	9th	1982	1	Wisconsin	WCHA	29–10–4	Tournament champion	8th	1982
2	Providence	ECAC Hockey	30–9–0	At-large bid	4th	1981	2	Minnesota	WCHA	31–10–1	At-large bid	11th	1981
3	New Hampshire	ECAC Hockey	22–9–2	At-large bid	4th	1982	3	Minnesota–Duluth	WCHA	28–14–1	At-large bid	1st	Never
4	St. Lawrence	ECAC Hockey	23–10–1	At-large bid	8th	1962	4	Michigan State	CCHA	30–10–0	Tournament champion	5th	1982

== Format ==
The tournament featured three rounds of play. The two odd-number ranked teams from one region were placed into a bracket with the two even-number ranked teams of the other region. The teams were then seeded according to their ranking. In the Quarterfinals the first and fourth seeds and the second and third seeds played two-game aggregate series to determine which school advanced to the Semifinals. Beginning with the Semifinals all games were played at the Winter Sports Center and all series became Single-game eliminations. The winning teams in the semifinals advanced to the National Championship Game with the losers playing in a Third Place game.

== Tournament bracket ==
Quarterfinals; March 18–20
E1	Harvard	6	3	9
W4	Michigan State	5	3	8
W2	Minnesota	9	7	16
E3	New Hampshire	6	2	8
W1	Wisconsin	6	7	13
E4	St. Lawrence	2	1	3
E2	Providence	7	3	10
W3	Minnesota–Duluth	3	2	5

Semifinals; March 24–25
E1	Harvard	5
W2	Minnesota	3
W1	Wisconsin	2
E2	Providence	0

National championship March 26
E1	Harvard	2
W1	Wisconsin	6
Third-place game
W2	Minnesota	3
E2	Providence	4

Note: * denotes overtime period(s)

=== Quarterfinals ===
==== (E1) Harvard vs. (W4) Michigan State ====
March 18	Harvard	6 – 5	Michigan State	Bright Hockey Center
(Code, Wheeler) Mark Fusco – 12:27 (Turner, S. Fusco) Shayne Kukulowicz – 15:53		First period	06:51 – Kelly Miller (Hamway, Beck); 08:53 – Newell Brown (Donnelly, Smyl)
(Kwong) Brian Busconi – 15:41		Second period	05:29 – Lyle Phair (Martin, Krentz); 13:43 – Jeff Eisley (Martin, Haight)
(Wheeler, M. Fusco) Greg Britz – 05:05 (North, Connors) Philip Falcone – 14:16 (Britz, Visone) Greg Chalmers – GW – 18:31		Third period	15:09 – Dan McFall (Hamway, Flegel)
(31 saves / 36 shots) Grant Blair		Goalie stats	Ron Scott (21 saves / 27 shots)

March 19	Harvard	3 – 3	Michigan State	Bright Hockey Center
(Turner, M. Fusco) Shayne Kukulowicz – 15:53		First period	No scoring
(Chalmers, Sheehy) Greg Britz – 01:36		Second period	05:03 – Mark Hamway (Haight); 11:19 – Dale Krentz (Brown, Taylor)
(Burke, Smith) Rob Wheeler – 06:54		Third period	12:56 – Lyle Phair (Brown, Krentz)
(28 saves / 31 shots) Grant Blair		Goalie stats	Ron Scott (26 saves / 29 shots)

Harvard won series 9–8

==== (E2) Providence vs. (W3) Minnesota–Duluth ====
March 18	Providence	7 – 3	Minnesota–Duluth	Schneider Arena	Recap
(Velischek, Taylor) Kurt Kleinendorst - PP - 08:19 (Raboin) Gates Orlando - PP - 12:04		First period	05:52 - Mike Krensing (Murray); 09:37 - Bob Lasko (Fishback, Moore); 19:44 - Mike Krensing (Graven, Valesano)
(Orlando) Randy Velischek - PP - 01:06 (unassisted) Kurt Kleinendorst - GW - 03:10 (Anderson, Taglianetti) Kurt Kleinendorst - 16:48		Second period	No scoring
(Army) Peter Taglianetti - 04:01 (Guay) Dave Wilkie - 07:50		Third period	No scoring
(21 saves / 24 shots) Mario Proulix (11 saves / 11 shots) Chris Terreri		Goalie stats	Bob Mason (25 saves / 32 shots)

March 19	Providence	3 – 2	Minnesota–Duluth	Schneider Arena	Recap
(Raboin, Velischek) Kurt Kleinendorst - PP - 06:08 (Raboin, Yeomelakis) Gates Orlando - 07:31		First period	15:22 - PP - Gregg Moore (Fishback, Krensing)
(Guay, Raboin) Steve Anderson - SH GW - 14:25		Second period	No scoring
No scoring		Third period	14:51 - PP - Tom Kurvers (Moore, Fishback)
(23 saves / 25 shots) Chris Terreri		Goalie stats	Bob Mason (27 saves / 30 shots)

Providence won series 10–5

==== (W1) Wisconsin vs. (E4) St. Lawrence ====
March 19	Wisconsin	6 – 2	St. Lawrence	Dane County Coliseum	Recap
(Chelios, Houston) Patrick Flatley – 8:05		First period
(Flatley, Driver) John Johannson – PP – 1:49 (Houston, Flatley) David Maley – GW – 8:39 (Maley, Flatley) Paul Houston – 18:59		Second period
(Walsh) David Maley – 8:03 (Houston, Jo. Johannson) Paul Houck – PP – 12:40		Third period	14:05 – Bruce Robertson (Castron, Robinson); 15:32 – Don Vaughan (unassisted)
( 20 saves / 22 shots ) Marc Behrend		Goalie stats	Gray Weicker ( 23 saves / 29 shots )

March 20	Wisconsin	7 – 1	St. Lawrence	Dane County Coliseum	Recap
(Chelios, Driver) John Johannson – PP – 4:07		First period
(unassisted) Scott Sabo – SH GW – 2:37 (Houck, Flatley) John Johannson – PP – 13:38		Second period	11:47 – PP – Chris Gunnarson (Leach, Smith)
(Wiitala, Pearson) Scott Sabo – 1:54 (Jo. Johannson) Paul Houck – 8:06 (Flatley) Paul Houck – 17:09 (unassisted) Chris Chelios – 18:36		Third period
( 33 saves / 34 shots ) Terry Kleisinger		Goalie stats	Gray Weicker ( 29 saves / 34 shots ) / J. C. Trimble ( 3 saves / 5 shots )

Wisconsin won series 13–3

==== (W2) Minnesota vs. (E3) New Hampshire ====
March 18	Minnesota	9 – 6	New Hampshire	Williams Arena	Recap
(unassisted) Mike Anderson - 00:45 (Micheletti, Malwitz) Corey Millen - 16:09 (Hirsch, Griffith) Corey Millen - 16:52		First period	14:29 - Paul Barton (Robinson, Potter); 16:41 - Normand Lacombe (Robinson, Herms); 17:46 - George White (Ellison, Lee)
(Kellin, Hirsch) Mike Herrer - 02:37 (Jensen, J. Larson) Mike Herrer - 05:10 (Erickson) Scott Bjugstad - 11:45 (unassisted) Mike Herrer - GW - 17:30		Second period	04:50 - George White (Forget, Ellison); 10:54 - Shane Skidmore (Robinson, Chisholm)
(Hirsch) Busty Erickson - 16:37 (Malwitz, Millen) David Jensen - 19:10		Third period	17:33 - Normand Lacombe (Robinson)
(11 saves / 16 shots) Frank Pietrangelo (12 saves / 13 shots) Mike Vacanti		Goalie stats	Todd Pearson (41 saves / 50 shots)

March 19	Minnesota	7 – 2	New Hampshire	Williams Arena	Recap
(K. Larson) Busty Erickson - PP - 19:16		First period	11:41 - PP - Paul Barton (Robinson, Potter)
(J. Larson, Anderson) Tom Hirsch - 02:25 (Micheletti) Corey Millen - GW - 05:27 (unassisted) Scott Bjugstad - 13:47 (Griffith, Millen) Scott Bjugstad - PP - 15:07		Second period	10:14 - Dan Potter (Lyons, Barton)
(Yon, Hirsch) Steve Griffith - SH - 10:49 (Griffith, Erickson) Scott Bjugstad - 19:31		Third period	No scoring
(26 saves / 28 shots) Mike Vacanti		Goalie stats	Todd Pearson (32 saves / 39 shots)

Minnesota won series 16–8

=== Semifinal ===
==== (W1) Wisconsin vs. (E2) Providence ====
March 24	Wisconsin	2 – 0	Providence	Winter Sports Center	Recap
No scoring		First period	No scoring
(Driver, Jo. Johannson) Paul Houck - PP GW - 00:37		Second period	No scoring
(Jo. Johannson, Houck) Jim Johannson - EN - 19:13		Third period	No scoring
(17 saves / 17 shots) Marc Behrend		Goalie stats	Mario Proulx (27 saves / 28 shots)

==== (E1) Harvard vs. (W2) Minnesota ====
March 25	Harvard	5 – 3	Minnesota	Winter Sports Center	Recap
(S. Fusco, Turner) Shayne Kukulowicz - PP - 02:41		First period	05:49 - SH - Billy Yon (Griffith, Guentzel)
(M. Fusco, Code) Scott Fusco - PP - 00:33		Second period	02:39 - PP - Busty Erickson (Bjugstad, J. Larson); 08:06 - PP - Corey Millen (Erickson, Vacanti)
(Britz, Visone) Scott Fusco - 04:55 (unassisted) Phil Falcone - GW - 09:16 (M. Fusco, S. Fusco) Jim Turner - 13:39		Third period	No scoring
(29 saves / 32 shots) Grant Blair		Goalie stats	Mike Vacanti (23 saves / 28 shots)

=== Third-place game ===
==== (E2) Providence vs. (W2) Minnesota ====
March 26	Providence	4 – 3	Minnesota	Winter Sports Center	Recap
(unassisted) Kurt Kleinendorst - 16:12		First period	07:02 - Wally Chapman (Kellin, Lempe)
(Costello, Rooney) Jim Rushin - 06:17 (Anderson, Orlando) Artie Yeomelakis - 07:27 (Army, Costello) Steve Rooney - GW - 09:24		Second period	No scoring
No scoring		Third period	03:22 - Tony Kellin (Millen, Malwitz); 06:13 - PP - Jeff Larson (Hirsch, Bjugstad)
(52 saves / 55 shots) Chris Terreri		Goalie stats	Frank Pietrangelo (24 saves / 28 shots)

=== National Championship ===
==== (E1) Harvard vs. (W1) Wisconsin ====
March 26	Harvard	2 – 6	Wisconsin	Winter Sports Center

Scoring summary
Period	Team	Goal	Assist(s)	Time	Score
1st	WIS	Patrick Flatley – PP	Houck and Driver	7:03	1–0 WIS
2nd	WIS	Patrick Flatley	Houston and Maley	36:09	2–0 WIS
3rd	WIS	Paul Houston – GW	Maley and Flatley	43:00	3–0 WIS
3rd	HAR	Scott Fusco	Sheehy and Kukulowicz	48:54	3–1 WIS
3rd	WIS	Bruce Driver	Sabo and Wiitala	51:35	4–1 WIS
3rd	HAR	Shayne Kukulowicz	Sheehy	52:22	4–2 WIS
3rd	WIS	Paul Houston – PP	Driver and Maley	58:39	5–2 WIS
3rd	WIS	John Johannson – SH EN	Behrend	59:21	6–2 WIS
Penalty summary
Period	Team	Player	Penalty	Time	PIM
1st	HAR	Dave Connors	Tripping	6:29	2:00
1st	WIS	Paul Houck	Tripping	11:01	2:00
1st	WIS	Marty Wiitala	Holding	17:38	2:00
1st	HAR	Shayne Kukulowicz	High Sticking	18:19	2:00
2nd	HAR	Mark Fusco	Roughing	30:12	2:00
2nd	WIS	Jim Johannson	Roughing	30:12	2:00
2nd	HAR	Scott Fusco	Hooking	30:53	2:00
2nd	WIS	Jan–Ake Danielson	High Sticking	36:50	2:00
2nd	HAR	Phil Falcone	Hooking	40:00	2:00
3rd	HAR	Grant Blair	Slashing	43:42	2:00
3rd	HAR	Shayne Kukulowicz	Slashing	58:12	2:00
3rd	WIS	Tim Sager	Hooking	59:01	2:00

Shots by period
Team	1	2	3	T
Wisconsin	14	10	13	37
Harvard	9	10	7	26

Goaltenders
Team	Name	Saves	Goals against	Time on ice
WIS	Marc Behrend	24	2	
HAR	Grant Blair	31	5	

== All-Tournament team ==
- G: Marc Behrend* (Wisconsin)
- D: Chris Chelios (Wisconsin)
- D: Mark Fusco (Harvard)
- F: Patrick Flatley (Wisconsin)
- F: Scott Fusco (Harvard)
- F: Paul Houck (Wisconsin)

* Most Outstanding Player(s)
