= Gray Weicker =

American ice hockey player (born 1960)

- Born: October 20, 1960 (age 65) Greenwich, Connecticut, USA
- Height: 6 ft 3 in (191 cm)
- Weight: 191 lb (87 kg; 13 st 9 lb)
- Position: Goaltender
- Played for: St. Lawrence; Mohawk Valley Stars; Binghamton Whalers
- Playing career: 1979–1984

Gray Weicker is an American retired ice hockey goaltender who was an All-American for St. Lawrence.

== Career ==
Weicker began his college career in the fall of 1979 as a member of Leon Abbott's final recruiting class. The team began the season well but lost 8 consecutive games before Christmas, leading to Abbott's resignation part way through the season. After finishing out the dismal season last in their conference, changes were sure to come. Weicker had played just 3 games that season and, once new coach Mike McShane was brought in, he began to see his time in goal increase. By the time his junior season rolled around, Weicker was the team's primary starter as well as being an alternate captain. SLU posted its first winning season in nearly a decade and Weicker finished in the top 10 in the nation with a 3.17 goals against average.

For his senior season Weicker was named team captain and led the Saints to their best season in over 20 years. St. Lawrence won the west division in ECAC Hockey and set a new program record with 23 wins, only the second 20+ win season in team history. Weicker was named an All-American and set a program record with 21 wins. St. Lawrence finished 4th in the ECAC tournament that season but, because of the team's regular season success, the Saints made their first NCAA Tournament appearance since 1962. St. Lawrence was felled by eventual champion Wisconsin but Weicker's time in Canton was still a rousing success for the program.

After graduating with a degree in sociology, Weicker signed with the Hartford Whalers and played the following season in their farm system. Success as a professional was hard to come by, however, and Weicker retired after just one season to work on the floor of the New York Stock Exchange. In 2001, while serving as a managing director for his own firm (Polcari/Weicker), he began coaching his daughters when they started playing hockey. He maintained his interest in coaching and continued to teach girls' hockey, working with the Darien High School girls' hockey team as of 2021.

== Statistics ==
=== Regular season and playoffs ===
			Regular season									Playoffs
Season	Team	League	GP	W	L	T	MIN	GA	SO	GAA	SV%	GP	W	L	MIN	GA	SO	GAA	SV%
1979–80	St. Lawrence	ECAC Hockey	3	1	0	0	84	4	0	2.86	.930	—	—	—	—	—	—	—	—
1980–81	St. Lawrence	ECAC Hockey	11	4	4	0	534	34	0	3.82	.874	—	—	—	—	—	—	—	—
1981–82	St. Lawrence	ECAC Hockey	20	12	4	1	1135	60	1	3.17	.903	—	—	—	—	—	—	—	—
1982–83	St. Lawrence	ECAC Hockey	32	21	11	0	1816	104	2	3.43	.881	—	—	—	—	—	—	—	—
1983–84	Mohawk Valley Stars	ACHL	38	13	20	2	2045	172	0	5.05	.837	2	—	—	—	—	—	—	—
1983–84	Binghamton Whalers	AHL	2	0	1	0	120	11	0	5.50	.838	—	—	—	—	—	—	—	—
NCAA totals			76	38	19	1	3569	202	3	3.39	.889	—	—	—	—	—	—	—	—

== Awards and honors ==
Award	Year
All-ECAC Hockey Second Team	1982–83
AHCA East All-American	1982–83
