= Bjugstad =

Bjugstad is a surname. Notable people with the surname include:

- Nick Bjugstad (born 1992), American ice hockey player
- Scott Bjugstad (born 1961), American ice hockey player
