= Grant Blair =

Canadian ice hockey player

- Born: August 15, 1964 (age 62) Stoney Creek, Ontario, Canada
- Height: 6 ft 0 in (183 cm)
- Weight: 160 lb (73 kg; 11 st 6 lb)
- Position: Goaltender
- Played for: Harvard; Salt Lake Golden Eagles; Kalamazoo Wings
- NHL draft: 111th, 1983; Calgary Flames
- Playing career: 1982–1988

Grant Blair (born August 15, 1964) is a Canadian retired ice hockey goaltender who was an All-American for Harvard.

== Career ==
Blair had a fairly charmed junior career, playing on a Burlington Cougars squad that won the Sutherland Cup. The following season he jumped up to Junior-A hockey with the Guelph Platers, and helped the team win the OJHL regular season title, the league championship, the Buckland Cup, the Dudley Hewitt Cup and the Eastern Canada Championship. The team finished as runners-up in the 1982 Centennial Cup for the national Junior-A championship.

Blair arrived in Boston just as Harvard was again becoming a power in college hockey. In his freshman season, Harvard need one of its goaltenders to step into the starter's role due to the graduation of Wade Lau. Blair quickly established himself in goal and backstopped the Crimson to its best finish in eight years. Blair allowed less than 2 goals per game in Harvard's first conference championship in twelve years and the team returned to the NCAA Tournament. The top-seeded Crimson squeaked by Michigan State in the quarterfinals and then downed Minnesota to make their first ever appearance in the NCAA Championship Game. While Harvard was soundly defeated by Wisconsin, Blair had performed so well during the season that he was selected by the Calgary Flames in the 1983 NHL entry draft.

Graduations took their toll on Harvard the following season and, though they won their division, the team finished below .500 with paltry offense. Blair's numbers were only slightly worse, however, and he led Harvard to having the #2 defense in the conference. After Blair's sophomore season, several teams from ECAC Hockey left to form a new conference, Hockey East. That, compiled with the team's offense recovering, enabled the Crimson to finish second in their conference in 1985. Blair's heroics helped the team finish with one of the top defenses in the country and was 4th in the nation with a 2.89 goals against average. While Harvard made the NCAA tournament once more, they lost both of their quarterfinal games.

As a senior, Blair was even better for Harvard. He set numerous career records for the program as well as several single-season highs. Most have since been surpassed but his name still appears all of Harvard's record book. Blair led the team to a first-place finish, their first since 1975, and though the team was upset in the conference semifinal, they did receive an at-large bid to the 1986 NCAA Tournament. Harvard and Blair were dominant through their first three games, charging into their second NCAA title game with their eye on the crown. The game began well for Harvard and the Crimson had a lead after each of the first two periods, but Michigan State would not go away and the Spartans' powerful offense began wearing down the Crimson D. MSU scored three goals in the third, the last with under 3 minutes to play, and Harvard could not finish the equalizer before time ran out. Despite being named an All-American, Blair could not lift Harvard to an elusive championship and left the program as the all-time winningest goaltender, a position he still holds as of 2021.

After graduating, Blair played two seasons of professional hockey in the IHL before hanging up his pads in 1988.

== Statistics ==
=== Regular season and playoffs ===
			Regular season									Playoffs
Season	Team	League	GP	W	L	T	MIN	GA	SO	GAA	SV%	GP	W	L	MIN	GA	SO	GAA	SV%
1980–81	Burlington Cougars	CJBHL	—	—	—	—	1367	78	0	3.42	—	—	—	—	—	—	—	—	—
1981–82	Guelph Platers	OJHL	20	—	—	—	1601	85	1	3.18	.826	—	—	—	—	—	—	—	—
1982–83	Harvard	ECAC Hockey	26	19	7	0	1575	72	3	2.74	.904	—	—	—	—	—	—	—	—
1983–84	Harvard	ECAC Hockey	23	10	11	2	1391	71	2	3.06	.910	—	—	—	—	—	—	—	—
1984–85	Harvard	ECAC Hockey	31	19	9	2	1785	86	1	2.89	.901	—	—	—	—	—	—	—	—
1985–86	Harvard	ECAC Hockey	31	24	6	1	1812	82	3	2.72	.896	—	—	—	—	—	—	—	—
1986–87	Salt Lake Golden Eagles	IHL	25	7	15	0	1431	108	0	4.53	.858	1	—	—	—	—	—	—	—
1987–88	Kalamazoo Wings	IHL	2	1	1	0	120	11	0	5.50	—	—	—	—	—	—	—	—	—
1987–88	Salt Lake Golden Eagles	IHL	19	10	6	0	813	51	0	3.76	.877	3	—	—	—	—	—	—	—
NCAA totals			111	72	33	5	6563	311	9	2.84	.905	—	—	—	—	—	—	—	—
IHL totals			46	18	22	0	2364	170	0	4.31	—	4	—	—	—	—	—	—	—

== Awards and honors ==
Award	Year
All-ECAC Hockey Second Team	1984–85
AHCA East Second-Team All-American	1985–86
