= Ted Speers =

American ice hockey player (born 1961)

- Born: January 28, 1961 (age 65) Ann Arbor, Michigan, U.S.A.
- Height: 5 ft 11 in (180 cm)
- Weight: 190 lb (86 kg; 13 st 8 lb)
- Position: Center
- Shot: Right
- Played for: Detroit Red Wings
- NHL draft: Undrafted
- Playing career: 1983–1987

Theodore Raymond Speers (born January 28, 1961) is an American retired professional ice hockey player who played four games in the National Hockey League (NHL) with the Detroit Red Wings during the 1985–86 season. The rest of his career, which lasted from 1983 to 1987, was spent in the American Hockey League. Before turning professional Speers spent four years playing for the University of Michigan.

== Career statistics ==
=== Regular season and playoffs ===
			Regular season					Playoffs
Season	Team	League	GP	G	A	Pts	PIM	GP	G	A	Pts	PIM
1978–79	Pioneer High School	HS-MI	—	—	—	—	—	—	—	—	—	—
1979–80	University of Michigan	B1G	30	13	16	29	16	—	—	—	—	—
1980–81	University of Michigan	B1G	39	22	23	45	20	—	—	—	—	—
1981–82	University of Michigan	B1G	38	23	16	39	46	—	—	—	—	—
1982–83	University of Michigan	B1G	36	18	41	59	40	—	—	—	—	—
1983–84	Adirondack Red Wings	AHL	79	15	25	40	27	7	2	1	3	9
1984–85	Adirondack Red Wings	AHL	80	22	31	53	40	—	—	—	—	—
1985–86	Detroit Red Wings	NHL	4	1	1	2	0	—	—	—	—	—
1985–86	Adirondack Red Wings	AHL	74	32	35	67	20	15	7	5	12	9
1986–87	Adirondack Red Wings	AHL	80	24	37	61	39	11	2	0	2	4
AHL totals			313	93	128	221	126	33	11	6	17	22
NHL totals			4	1	1	2	0	—	—	—	—	—

== Awards and honors ==
Award	Year
All-CCHA First Team	1982-83
