= Mark Fusco =

American ice hockey player (born 1961)

- Born: March 12, 1961 (age 64); Burlington, Massachusetts, U.S.
- Height: 5 ft 9 in (175 cm)
- Weight: 175 lb (79 kg; 12 st 7 lb)
- Position: Defense
- Shot: Right
- Played for: Hartford Whalers
- National team: United States
- NHL draft: Undrafted
- Playing career: 1983–1985

Mark Edward Fusco (born March 12, 1961) is an American former professional ice hockey player who appeared in 80 National Hockey League (NHL) regular season games for the Hartford Whalers in 1984–85. As an amateur, Fusco won the Hobey Baker Award in 1983 while playing for the Harvard Crimson men's ice hockey team. That season he set the school record for points by a Harvard defenseman in one season, which stood until it was surpassed by Adam Fox in 2019.

Fusco played hockey for the United States at the 1984 Winter Olympics. Fusco also represented the U.S. in the 1984 Canada Cup and 1985 Ice Hockey World Championship tournaments before retiring from professional hockey. Fusco was inducted into the United States Hockey Hall of Fame in 2002, and was named a recipient of the 2009 NCAA Silver Anniversary Award.

After attending Harvard Business School, Fusco became a successful entrepreneur in new software development businesses. From 2005 to 2013, Fusco was Chief Executive Officer and President of Aspen Technology Inc.

His younger brother Scott is also a hockey player of note.

== Awards and honors ==
Award	Year
All-ECAC Hockey First Team	1980–81
AHCA East All-American	1980–81
All-ECAC Hockey Second Team	1981–82
AHCA East All-American	1981–82
All-ECAC Hockey First Team	1982–83
AHCA East All-American	1982–83
All-NCAA All-Tournament Team	1983

== Career statistics ==
=== Regular season and playoffs ===
			Regular season					Playoffs
Season	Team	League	GP	G	A	Pts	PIM	GP	G	A	Pts	PIM
1977–78	Belmont Hill School	HS-Prep	—	—	—	—	—	—	—	—	—	—
1978–79	Belmont Hill School	HS-Prep	—	—	—	—	—	—	—	—	—	—
1979–80	Harvard University	ECAC	26	13	16	29	20	—	—	—	—	—
1980–81	Harvard University	ECAC	23	7	13	20	28	—	—	—	—	—
1981–82	Harvard University	ECAC	30	11	29	40	46	—	—	—	—	—
1982–83	Harvard University	ECAC	33	13	33	46	30	—	—	—	—	—
1983–84	United States	Intl.	50	4	24	28	20	—	—	—	—	—
1983–84	Hartford Whalers	NHL	17	0	4	4	2	—	—	—	—	—
1984–85	Hartford Whalers	NHL	63	3	8	11	40	—	—	—	—	—
NHL totals			80	3	12	15	42	—	—	—	—	—

=== International ===
Year	Team	Event	GP	G	A	Pts	PIM
1981	United States	WJC	3	0	0	0	2
1984	United States	OG	6	0	0	0	6
1984	United States	CC	1	0	0	0	2
1985	United States	WC	10	0	1	1	4
Junior totals			3	0	0	0	2
Senior totals			17	0	1	1	12

Awards and achievements
Preceded by Bill Whelton	ECAC Hockey Rookie of the Year; 1979–80	Succeeded by Don Sylvestri
Preceded by George McPhee	Winner of the Hobey Baker Award; 1982–83	Succeeded by Tom Kurvers
