= Jan-Åke Danielson =

American ice hockey player

- Born: January 2, 1960 (age 66) Insjön, Sweden
- Height: 6 ft 0 in (183 cm)
- Weight: 174 lb (79 kg; 12 st 6 lb)
- Position: Defenceman
- Shot: Right
- Played for: Wisconsin; Djurgårdens IF; Leksands IF
- Playing career: 1976–1988

Jan-Åke Danielson is a Swedish ice hockey scout and former player and coach. He won a national championship with Wisconsin before embarking on a long administrative career, mostly with the Anaheim Ducks.

== Career ==
Danielson began his junior career as a 14-year old on the Leksands J20 squad in the Juniorserien, a forerunner of the J20 Nationell. He played well against much older competition and was invited to participate on various national junior teams. After turning 17, Danielson got his first taste of professional hockey when he appeared for Djurgårdens IF and helped the club earn promotion to Elitserien for the following year. He was also a member of the Swedish team that won the first European Junior U18 Championships in 1977. He spent most of the following year with Djurgårdens at the top level of Swedish hockey. Though he recorded only 1 assist in 31 games, he was stable enough on the defensive end to remain with the club.

Danielson began to come into his own in 1979, posting respectable offensive numbers while helping Djurgårdens finish 3rd in the Swedish Elite League. Though he went scoreless in 5 playoff games, he nonetheless helped the team make the finals. Unfortunately, Djurgårdens fell 1 game shy of winning the championship. Danielson returned to Leksands in 1979 and, while he still was not an offensive force, he lifted the team to a 1st-place finish in the regular season. Despite being the top team, Leksands was swept out in the semifinals and then tumbled down the standing the following year, just barely managing to escape being relegated.

At the age of 21, Danielson took the rather unprecedented step of travelling to North America to play college ice hockey. He joined Wisconsin mid-way through the season and helped the Badgers reach the national championship game in 1982. Though they fell to North Dakota, the team was just as strong the following year and this time Danielson was able to hold up the championship trophy. 1983 saw Danielson find an offensive side to his game and average over a point per game for the season. While he finished in the top 10 for scoring for defensemen, Wisconsin flagged in the standings and failed to make the tournament. After the 1984 season, Danielson was unable to play for the Badgers any longer but he remained at the university to finish his degree, graduating in 1986.

With his education finished, Danielson returned to Sweden and restarted his playing career with Hanhals BK. He continued to display his scoring touch, scoring 84 points in 60 games over two seasons. In his second season with the club, he serves as player/coach and transitioned to become a full time head coach starting in 1988. Two years later he helped the team win the Division 2 championship and earn a promotion to Division 1. Danielson then served as head coach for Mölndals IF for a year before being brought on as an assistant for the national junior team. He remained in that position for 4 years, helping the Swedes win 3 silver medals and 1 bronze. He returned to Mölndals in 1997 as head coach but lasted just 1 season before ending his coaching career.

While Danielson was done with coaching, he remained in the sport as a scout and was hired by the Mighty Ducks of Anaheim as a European scout. He worked in that capacity for 16 years, which included helping the renamed Anaheim Ducks win the Stanley Cup in 2007. He was promoted to being the club's head European scout in 2014 and was key in the decision to select Leo Carlsson 2nd overall in 2023.

== Career statistics ==
=== Regular season and playoffs ===
			Regular Season					Playoffs
Season	Team	League	GP	G	A	Pts	PIM	GP	G	A	Pts	PIM
1976–77	Djurgårdens IF	Division 1	6	2	1	3	0	8	0	1	1	2
1977–78	Djurgårdens IF	Elitserien	31	0	1	1	12	—	—	—	—	—
1978–79	Djurgårdens IF	Elitserien	31	4	5	9	12	5	0	0	0	0
1979–80	Leksands IF	Elitserien	25	3	1	4	6	2	0	0	0	0
1980–81	Leksands IF	Elitserien	22	3	1	4	14	—	—	—	—	—
1981–82	Wisconsin	WCHA	12	0	3	3	6	—	—	—	—	—
1982–83	Wisconsin	WCHA	36	0	10	10	16	—	—	—	—	—
1983–84	Wisconsin	WCHA	36	5	36	41	16	—	—	—	—	—
1984–85	DNP
1985–86	DNP
1986–87	Hanhals BK	Division 2	30	21	35	56	—	—	—	—	—	—
1987–88	Hanhals HK	Division 2	31	7	21	28	—	—	—	—	—	—
NCAA Totals			84	5	49	54	38	—	—	—	—	—
Division 2 Totals			61	28	56	84	—	—	—	—	—	—
Elitserien Totals			109	10	8	18	44	7	0	0	0	0
