= Greg Britz =

American ice hockey player (born 1961)

- Born: January 3, 1961 (age 65) Buffalo, New York, U.S.
- Height: 6 ft 0 in (183 cm)
- Weight: 190 lb (86 kg; 13 st 8 lb)
- Position: Right wing
- Shot: Left
- Played for: Toronto Maple Leafs; Hartford Whalers
- NHL draft: Undrafted
- Playing career: 1983–1987

Gregory J. Britz (born January 3, 1961) is a former American professional ice hockey forward. He played in the National Hockey League (NHL) for the Toronto Maple Leafs and Hartford Whalers.

== Early life ==
Britz was born in Buffalo, New York, but grew up in Marblehead, Massachusetts.

== College ==
After completing St. Michael's College School in Toronto, Ontario, forward Greg Britz enrolled at Harvard University, where he played for the school's hockey team. During his freshman season in the NCAA, Britz played in 26 games, scoring eight goals and 13 points. He had four seasons in the Ivy League and his most productive season came during his senior year, 1982–83, when he tallied 16 goals and 39 points in 33 games. Following his professional hockey career, he graduated from Northeastern Law School.

== Professional career ==
In the fall of 1983, Britz signed a pro contract with the St. Catharines Saints, then the farm team of the Toronto Maple Leafs. He dressed for 44 games with the Saints, compiling 23 goals and 39 points. His strong two-way play caught the eye of the Leafs, who called him up for six games to fill in for injured players. However, he saw limited ice time with the big club and failed to reach the scoresheet.

Britz played another two years with the Saints and played one more game with the Maple Leafs in 1984–84. In 1986–87, Britz joined the Binghamton Whalers, where he had 25 goals and 41 points in 74 games. He also played his final NHL game that year, getting into the lineup of the Hartford Whalers for one game. Britz had an eight-game NHL career and was held pointless with four minutes in penalties.

== Career statistics ==
=== Regular season and playoffs ===
			Regular season					Playoffs
Season	Team	League	GP	G	A	Pts	PIM	GP	G	A	Pts	PIM
1978–79	St. Michael's Buzzers	OPJAHL	42	26	26	52	50	—	—	—	—	—
1979–80	Harvard University	ECAC	26	8	5	13	17	—	—	—	—	—
1980–81	Harvard University	ECAC	17	3	4	7	10	—	—	—	—	—
1981–82	Harvard University	ECAC	24	11	13	24	12	—	—	—	—	—
1982–83	Harvard University	ECAC	33	16	23	39	18	—	—	—	—	—
1983–84	Toronto Maple Leafs	NHL	6	0	0	0	2	—	—	—	—	—
1983–84	St. Catharines Saints	AHL	44	23	16	39	25	7	1	0	1	0
1984–85	Toronto Maple Leafs	NHL	1	0	0	0	2	—	—	—	—	—
1984–85	St. Catharines Saints	AHL	74	15	17	32	31	—	—	—	—	—
1985–86	St. Catharines Saints	AHL	72	17	19	36	52	13	3	3	6	7
1986–87	Hartford Whalers	NHL	1	0	0	0	0	—	—	—	—	—
1986–87	Binghamton Whalers	AHL	74	25	16	41	66	13	3	3	6	6
AHL totals			264	80	68	148	174	33	7	6	13	13
NHL totals			8	0	0	0	4	—	—	—	—	—
