= Bryan Erickson (ice hockey) =

American former ice hockey player

- Born: March 7, 1960 (age 65) Roseau, Minnesota, U.S.
- Height: 5 ft 9 in (175 cm)
- Weight: 175 lb (79 kg; 12 st 7 lb)
- Position: Right wing
- Shot: Right
- Played for: Washington Capitals; Los Angeles Kings; Pittsburgh Penguins; Winnipeg Jets
- National team: United States
- NHL draft: Undrafted
- Playing career: 1979–1994

Bryan Lee Erickson (born March 7, 1960) is an American former professional ice hockey player.

== Career ==
Signed in 1983 as a free agent by the Washington Capitals after starring for the University of Minnesota men's ice hockey team, Erickson played parts of two seasons with the Capitals before he was traded to the Los Angeles Kings.

He also played with the Pittsburgh Penguins and Winnipeg Jets before retiring from active professional play after the 1993–94 NHL season. Erickson resides today in Roseau pursuing business interests.

Erickson frequently played for Team USA in international hockey. He was a member of the 1982, 1986 and 1987 Ice Hockey World Championship teams as well as the 1984 Canada Cup. On September 20, 2012, he was elected to the University of Minnesota "M" Club and was celebrated as part of the 2012 inductee group at the September 22, 2012 football game in which the University of Minnesota beat Syracuse University 17–10. As an integral part of the Minnesota family, the "M" Club endeavors to uphold and enrich the great tradition of Golden Gopher Athletics.

== Awards and honors ==
Award	Year
All-WCHA Second Team	1981–82
All-WCHA First Team	1982–83

== Career statistics ==
=== Regular season and playoffs ===
			Regular season					Playoffs
Season	Team	League	GP	G	A	Pts	PIM	GP	G	A	Pts	PIM
1976–77	Roseau High School	HS-MN	—	—	—	—	—	—	—	—	—	—
1977–78	Roseau High School	HS-MN	—	—	—	79	—	—	—	—	—	—
1979–80	University of Minnesota	WCHA	23	10	15	25	14	—	—	—	—	—
1980–81	University of Minnesota	WCHA	44	39	47	86	30	—	—	—	—	—
1981–82	University of Minnesota	WCHA	35	25	20	45	20	—	—	—	—	—
1982–83	University of Minnesota	WCHA	42	35	47	82	30	—	—	—	—	—
1982–83	Hershey Bears	AHL	1	0	1	1	0	3	3	0	3	0
1983–84	Hershey Bears	AHL	31	16	12	28	11	—	—	—	—	—
1983–84	Washington Capitals	NHL	45	12	17	29	16	8	2	3	5	7
1984–85	Binghamton Whalers	AHL	13	6	11	17	8	8	1	4	5	6
1984–85	Washington Capitals	NHL	57	15	13	28	23	—	—	—	—	—
1985–86	Binghamton Whalers	AHL	7	5	3	8	2	—	—	—	—	—
1985–86	New Haven Nighthawks	AHL	14	8	3	11	11	—	—	—	—	—
1985–86	Los Angeles Kings	NHL	55	20	23	43	36	—	—	—	—	—
1986–87	Los Angeles Kings	NHL	68	20	30	50	26	3	1	1	2	0
1987–88	New Haven Nighthawks	AHL	3	0	0	0	0	—	—	—	—	—
1987–88	Los Angeles Kings	NHL	42	6	15	21	20	—	—	—	—	—
1987–88	Pittsburgh Penguins	NHL	11	1	4	5	0	—	—	—	—	—
1988–89	HC Merano	ITA	38	38	56	94	29	—	—	—	—	—
1989–90	Lausanne HC	SWI-2	13	7	8	15	10	—	—	—	—	—
1989–90	Moncton Hawks	AHL	13	4	7	11	4	—	—	—	—	—
1990–91	Moncton Hawks	AHL	36	18	14	32	16	9	9	2	11	6
1990–91	Winnipeg Jets	NHL	6	0	7	7	0	—	—	—	—	—
1991–92	Winnipeg Jets	NHL	10	2	4	6	0	—	—	—	—	—
1992–93	Moncton Hawks	AHL	2	1	1	2	4	—	—	—	—	—
1992–93	Winnipeg Jets	NHL	41	4	12	16	14	3	0	0	0	0
1993–94	Moncton Hawks	AHL	3	0	1	1	2	—	—	—	—	—
1993–94	Winnipeg Jets	NHL	16	0	0	0	6	—	—	—	—	—
NHL totals			351	80	125	205	141	14	3	4	7	7

=== International ===
Year	Team	Event	GP	G	A	Pts	PIM
1979	United States	WJC	5	2	1	3	6
1980	United States	WJC	4	2	2	4	2
1982	United States	WC	7	1	1	2	6
1984	United States	CC	6	2	2	4	4
1986	United States	WC	10	8	1	9	10
1987	United States	WC	10	4	4	8	8
Junior totals			9	4	3	7	8
Senior totals			33	15	8	23	28
