= Paul Houck =

- Born: August 12, 1963 (age 62) Vancouver, BC, Canada
- Height: 6 ft 0 in (183 cm)
- Weight: 185 lb (84 kg; 13 st 3 lb)
- Position: Right wing
- Shot: Right
- Played for: Minnesota North Stars
- National team: Canada
- NHL draft: 71st overall, 1981; Edmonton Oilers
- Playing career: 1984–1991

Paul Houck (born August 12, 1963 in Vancouver, British Columbia) is a former ice hockey player. He had a successful college career with the University of Wisconsin between 1981 and 1985, and was named a Western Collegiate Hockey Association Second Team All-Star in 1983, as well as earning a spot on the National Collegiate Athletic Association Championship All-Tournament team. He was selected 71st overall by the Edmonton Oilers in the 1981 NHL entry draft, and traded to the Minnesota North Stars in 1985. Houck played 16 National Hockey League games for the North Stars between 1985 and 1988, scoring one goal and two assists while spending most of his career in the minor leagues. He played two seasons in the Netherlands between 1989 and 1991 before retiring. His son, Jackson Houck, was drafted 94th overall by the Edmonton Oilers in the 2013 NHL entry draft. Paul, of the 1981 NHL entry draft, and his son, of the 2013 NHL entry draft, become the first father-and-son tandem drafted by the Edmonton Oilers in the team's history.

== Career statistics ==
=== Regular season and playoffs ===
			Regular season					Playoffs
Season	Team	League	GP	G	A	Pts	PIM	GP	G	A	Pts	PIM
1980–81	Kelowna Buckaroos	BCJHL	56	65	53	118	39	—	—	—	—	—
1981–82	University of Wisconsin	NCAA	43	9	16	25	38	—	—	—	—	—
1982–83	University of Wisconsin	NCAA	47	38	33	71	36	—	—	—	—	—
1983–84	University of Wisconsin	NCAA	37	20	20	40	29	—	—	—	—	—
1984–85	University of Wisconsin	NCAA	38	15	26	41	34	—	—	—	—	—
1984–85	Nova Scotia Oilers	AHL	10	1	0	1	0	—	—	—	—	—
1985–86	Springfield Falcons	AHL	61	15	17	32	27	—	—	—	—	—
1985–86	Minnesota North Stars	NHL	3	1	0	1	0	—	—	—	—	—
1986–87	Springfield Indians	AHL	64	29	18	47	58	—	—	—	—	—
1986–87	Minnesota North Stars	NHL	12	0	2	2	2	—	—	—	—	—
1987–88	Kalamazoo Wings	IHL	74	27	29	56	73	7	3	4	7	8
1987–88	Minnesota North Stars	NHL	1	0	0	0	0	—	—	—	—	—
1988–89	Springfield Falcons	AHL	2	1	0	1	0	—	—	—	—	—
1988–89	Indianapolis Ice	IHL	81	22	37	59	51	—	—	—	—	—
1989–90	Peter Langhout Reizen Utrecht	NED	40	35	46	81	—	—	—	—	—	—
1990–91	Peter Langhout Utrecht	NED	41	37	40	77	49	—	—	—	—	—
AHL totals			137	46	35	81	85	—	—	—	—	—
IHL totals			155	49	66	115	124	7	3	4	7	8
NHL totals			16	1	2	3	2	—	—	—	—	—

== Awards and honors ==
Award	Year
All-WCHA Second Team	1982–83
All-NCAA All-Tournament Team	1983
