= John Johannson =

American ice hockey player (born 1961)

- Born: October 18, 1961 (age 64) Rochester, Minnesota, U.S.
- Height: 6 ft 1 in (185 cm)
- Weight: 175 lb (79 kg; 12 st 7 lb)
- Position: Center
- Shot: Left
- Played for: New Jersey Devils
- National team: United States
- NHL draft: 192d overall, 1981; Colorado Rockies
- Playing career: 1983–1985

John Joseph Johannson (born October 18, 1961) is a retired American ice hockey center. He played for the United States at the 1981 World Junior Championships. Johannson was drafted by the Colorado Rockies in the 10th round, 192nd overall in the 1981 NHL entry draft. Following his senior year at the University of Wisconsin, his second consecutive 20 goal season, Johannson played 5 games with the New Jersey Devils in the NHL. The following season Johannson played for Wiener EV in Austria's second tier Nationalliga scoring 84 points in 23 games. Johannson retired after playing one year in Austria and went into the real estate business.

Johannson was the oldest of three children to Ken Johannson and Marietta Sand. His father and his younger brother Jim Johannson, both served terms as general manager of the United States men's national ice hockey team.

== Career statistics ==
=== Regular season and playoffs ===
			Regular season					Playoffs
Season	Team	League	GP	G	A	Pts	PIM	GP	G	A	Pts	PIM
1979–80	Mayo High School	HS-MN	—	—	—	—	—	—	—	—	—	—
1980–81	University of Wisconsin	WCHA	38	6	12	18	32	—	—	—	—	—
1981–82	University of Wisconsin	WCHA	47	15	34	49	46	—	—	—	—	—
1982–83	University of Wisconsin	WCHA	47	22	41	63	68	—	—	—	—	—
1983–84	University of Wisconsin	WCHA	39	21	25	46	32	—	—	—	—	—
1983–84	New Jersey Devils	NHL	5	0	0	0	0	—	—	—	—	—
1984–85	Wiener EV	AUT-2	23	41	43	84	34	—	—	—	—	—
NHL totals			5	0	0	0	0	—	—	—	—	—

=== International ===
Year	Team	Event	GP	G	A	Pts	PIM
1981	United States	WJC	4	2	0	2	0
Junior totals			4	2	0	2	0
