= David Maley =

American ice hockey player and radio/television analyst

- Born: April 24, 1963 (age 63) Beaver Dam, Wisconsin, U.S
- Height: 6 ft 2 in (188 cm)
- Weight: 195 lb (88 kg; 13 st 13 lb)
- Position: Left wing
- Shot: Left
- Played for: Montreal Canadiens; New Jersey Devils; Edmonton Oilers; San Jose Sharks; New York Islanders
- National team: United States
- NHL draft: 33rd overall, 1982; Montreal Canadiens
- Playing career: 1986–1996; 1999–2000

David Joseph Maley (born April 24, 1963) is an American radio and television analyst for the San Jose Sharks and former professional hockey player. He played in the National Hockey League with the Montreal Canadiens, New Jersey Devils, Edmonton Oilers, San Jose Sharks and New York Islanders between 1986 and 1994.

== Hockey career ==
Maley was a part of the University of Wisconsin–Madison team that won the NCAA Division I hockey championship in 1983, and a member of the Montreal Canadiens when they won the Stanley Cup in 1986.

== Broadcasting career ==
Maley is a pre-game analyst and intermission reporter for Sharks radio broadcasts. He also joins Dan Rusanowsky and Baker, now Hedican in a "triple-cast" format during some regular season and home playoff games.

== Personal life ==
Maley grew up in Edina, Minnesota. He is an uncle of NFL tight end Rhett Ellison.

A resident of San Jose, Maley previously owned Rollin' Ice, a roller hockey facility. He was also formerly the president of the Silver Creek Sportsplex, an indoor sports and fitness facility in San Jose.

== Career statistics ==
=== Regular season and playoffs ===
			Regular season					Playoffs
Season	Team	League	GP	G	A	Pts	PIM	GP	G	A	Pts	PIM
1982–83	University of Wisconsin	WCHA	47	17	23	40	24	—	—	—	—	—
1983–84	University of Wisconsin	WCHA	38	10	28	38	56	—	—	—	—	—
1984–85	University of Wisconsin	WCHA	35	19	9	28	86	—	—	—	—	—
1985–86	University of Wisconsin	WCHA	42	20	40	60	135	—	—	—	—	—
1985–86	Montreal Canadiens	NHL	3	0	0	0	0	7	1	3	4	2
1986–87	Montreal Canadiens	NHL	48	6	12	18	55	—	—	—	—	—
1986–87	Sherbrooke Canadiens	AHL	11	1	5	6	25	12	7	7	14	10
1987–88	New Jersey Devils	NHL	44	4	2	6	65	20	3	1	4	80
1987–88	Utica Devils	AHL	9	5	3	8	40	—	—	—	—	—
1988–89	New Jersey Devils	NHL	68	5	6	11	249	—	—	—	—	—
1989–90	New Jersey Devils	NHL	67	8	17	25	160	6	0	0	0	25
1990–91	New Jersey Devils	NHL	64	8	14	22	151	—	—	—	—	—
1991–92	New Jersey Devils	NHL	37	7	11	18	58	—	—	—	—	—
1991–92	Edmonton Oilers	NHL	23	3	6	9	46	10	1	1	2	4
1992–93	Edmonton Oilers	NHL	13	1	1	2	29	—	—	—	—	—
1992–93	San Jose Sharks	NHL	43	1	6	7	126	—	—	—	—	—
1993–94	San Jose Sharks	NHL	19	0	0	0	30	—	—	—	—	—
1993–94	New York Islanders	NHL	37	0	6	6	74	3	0	0	0	0
1995–96	San Francisco Spiders	IHL	71	16	13	29	248	4	0	0	0	2
1999–00	Albany River Rats	AHL	60	5	10	15	52	5	0	1	1	4
NHL totals			466	43	81	124	1043	46	5	5	10	111

=== International ===
Year	Team	Event	GP	G	A	Pts	PIM
1991	United States	WC	8	0	1	1	2
Senior totals			8	0	1	1	2

== See also ==
- Striker's Den
