= Chris Chelios =

American ice hockey player (born 1962)

- Hockey Hall of Fame, 2013
- Chelios in 2023
- Born: January 25, 1962 (age 64) Chicago, Illinois, U.S.
- Height: 6 ft 0 in (183 cm)
- Weight: 191 lb (87 kg; 13 st 9 lb)
- Position: Defense
- Shot: Right
- Played for: Montreal Canadiens; Chicago Blackhawks; EHC Biel; Detroit Red Wings; Atlanta Thrashers
- National team: United States
- NHL draft: 40th overall, 1981; Montreal Canadiens
- Playing career: 1984–2010
Medal record
Men's ice hockey
Representing the United States
Olympic Games
Silver medal – second place	2002 Salt Lake City
World Cup of Hockey
Gold medal – first place	1996 United States
Canada Cup
Silver medal – second place	1991 Canada

Christos Konstantinos Chelios (born January 25, 1962) is an American former professional ice hockey defenseman. He was a three-time Stanley Cup champion: one with the Montreal Canadiens and two with the Detroit Red Wings.

Chelios played for the Canadiens, Blackhawks, Detroit Red Wings, and the Atlanta Thrashers. When he was called up from the AHL's Chicago Wolves to play for the Thrashers during the 2009–10 NHL season, Chelios was the oldest active player in the National Hockey League (NHL) and the second-oldest of all time. He had played the most games of any active player in the NHL, was the last player from the 1981 NHL entry draft still active (or any draft from 1986 and earlier), and had the most career penalty minutes of any active player. He is the former record-holder for most games played in the NHL by a defenseman, is eighth overall with 1,651 games played, holds the record for most career playoff games played with 266 and is tied with Gordie Howe for most NHL seasons played with 26. On May 1, 2009, he appeared in the playoffs for an NHL record 24th time, having missed the playoffs only once. Chelios is also the record-holder for most career postseason losses, with 117 (also the most in any professional sport in North America). He only lost one Game 7 in his career, however, a 3–2 OT loss in the 1985 Adams Division Finals against the Nordiques. In 2017, Chelios was named one of the "100 Greatest NHL Players" in history.

Chelios is of Greek heritage. His cousin, Nikos Tselios, also played professional hockey and is a former first round draft pick of the Carolina Hurricanes. Chelios was inducted into the Hockey Hall of Fame on November 8, 2013, and inducted into the IIHF Hall of Fame in 2018. Chelios is the Class of 2025 for the Michigan Sports Hall of Fame and will be enshrined on December 19, 2025 in Detroit.

== Playing career ==
=== Early years ===
Chelios was born in Chicago on January 25, 1962, to Gus and Susan Chelios. They lived in Evergreen Park, Illinois, just south of Chicago. Chris attended Mount Carmel High School not far from the shore of Lake Michigan until his family moved to Poway, California. Then he went to Mira Mesa High School in the north part of San Diego.

Unable to play high school hockey in Southern California, Chelios was not recruited by any U.S. colleges. His only scholarship offer came from San Diego-based United States International University, the only NCAA Division I hockey team west of the Rockies. When Chelios arrived on campus as a freshman in 1979, however, he soon realized he was in the wrong environment, facing bigger players with considerably more junior hockey experience. He was eventually cut from the team. Chelios tried his luck in Canada, where he was twice cut by Junior B teams.

Chelios was drafted by the Montreal Canadiens in the 1981 NHL entry draft. Prior to that, he played for the Moose Jaw Canucks of the Saskatchewan Junior Hockey League, where he tallied 87 points and 175 penalty minutes in 54 games in his final season. Chelios then played for the Wisconsin Badgers at the University of Wisconsin–Madison after being drafted. He was selected for the United States team at the 1982 World Junior Ice Hockey Championship. In 1983, he was part of the Badgers' NCAA Men's Ice Hockey Championship team and was named to the all-tournament team and the second WCHA all-star team. Chelios was a member of the U.S. team for the 1984 Winter Olympics in Sarajevo, Yugoslavia. Next he debuted for the Canadiens, playing 12 games in the regular season and 15 in the playoffs. That summer he joined the U.S. team at the 1984 Canada Cup.

=== Montreal Canadiens (1984–1990) ===
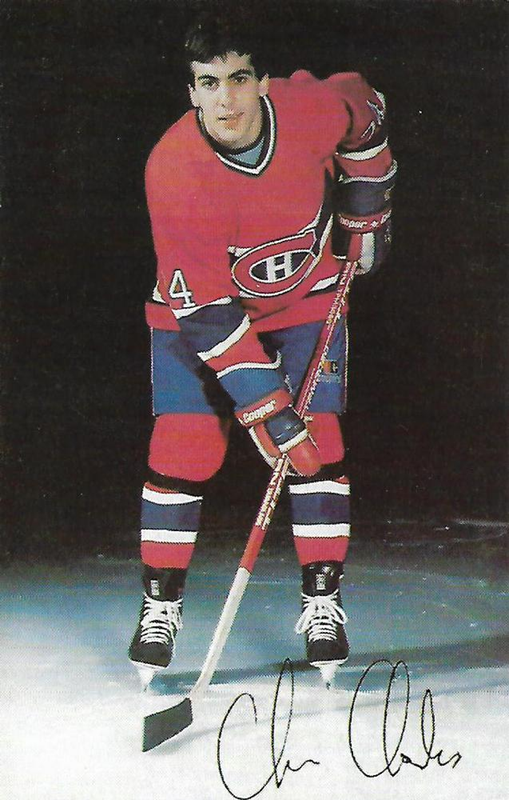
Chelios with the Canadiens c. 1984

In 1984, Chelios made the Montreal Canadiens for good. During his early days, he was known for his offensive abilities, and his teammates even called him "Soft Hands Chelios". He earned a trip to the National Hockey League All-Star Game and was named to the 1985 NHL All-Rookie Team. He scored 64 points in 74 games, a high total for a defenseman even in the high-scoring 1980s, and finished second to Mario Lemieux for the Calder Memorial Trophy. In the playoffs that year, he had 10 points in nine games, with a +17 plus/minus. Although he only played 41 games in the 1985–86 season, he won his first Stanley Cup, playing in front of Conn Smythe Trophy-winning goaltender Patrick Roy.

During the 1988–89 campaign. He scored 73 points in 80 games at +35, was named to the All-Star first-team, and won his first James Norris Memorial Trophy. During that year's Wales Conference (now Eastern Conference) Finals series against the Philadelphia Flyers (which the Canadiens won in six games), Chelios became reviled by Flyer fans for a hit on Brian Propp that left the Philadelphia winger with a serious concussion and forced him to miss the next game. The Flyers did not retaliate against Chelios until late in Game 6; Flyers goaltender Ron Hextall skated out of his net to attack Chelios, earning him a 12-game suspension.

After playing only 53 games the following season (in which he served as Canadiens' co-captain, with Guy Carbonneau, making Chelios the first non-Canadian player to captain the Canadiens), Chelios was traded to his hometown team, the Chicago Blackhawks, on June 29, 1990, with a 2nd-round draft pick for Denis Savard. The trade occurred one day after Chelios was accused of fighting with two police officers as they tried to arrest him for urinating in public outside a bar in downtown Madison, Wisconsin, according to a criminal complaint.

=== Chicago Blackhawks (1990–1999) ===
In his first season with Chicago, Chelios tallied 64 points and earned a spot on the Second NHL All-Star team. He helped lead the Blackhawks to the Stanley Cup Final in 1992, where they were swept by the Pittsburgh Penguins. He was in top form for the 1992–93 season, scoring 73 points and winning his second James Norris Memorial Trophy. During the 1994–95 NHL lockout he played for EHC Biel in the Swiss National League A.

For the 1995–96 season, Chelios was named captain of the Blackhawks, a role he served in until 1999. He scored 72 points and won his third James Norris Memorial Trophy. In the summer of 1996, he helped lead the United States to defeating Canada in the 1996 World Cup of Hockey finals. Chelios was named to the All-Tournament Team.

=== Detroit Red Wings (1999–2009) ===
On March 23, 1999, at the trade deadline, Chelios was traded to the Detroit Red Wings for Anders Eriksson and first-round draft picks in 1999 and 2001.

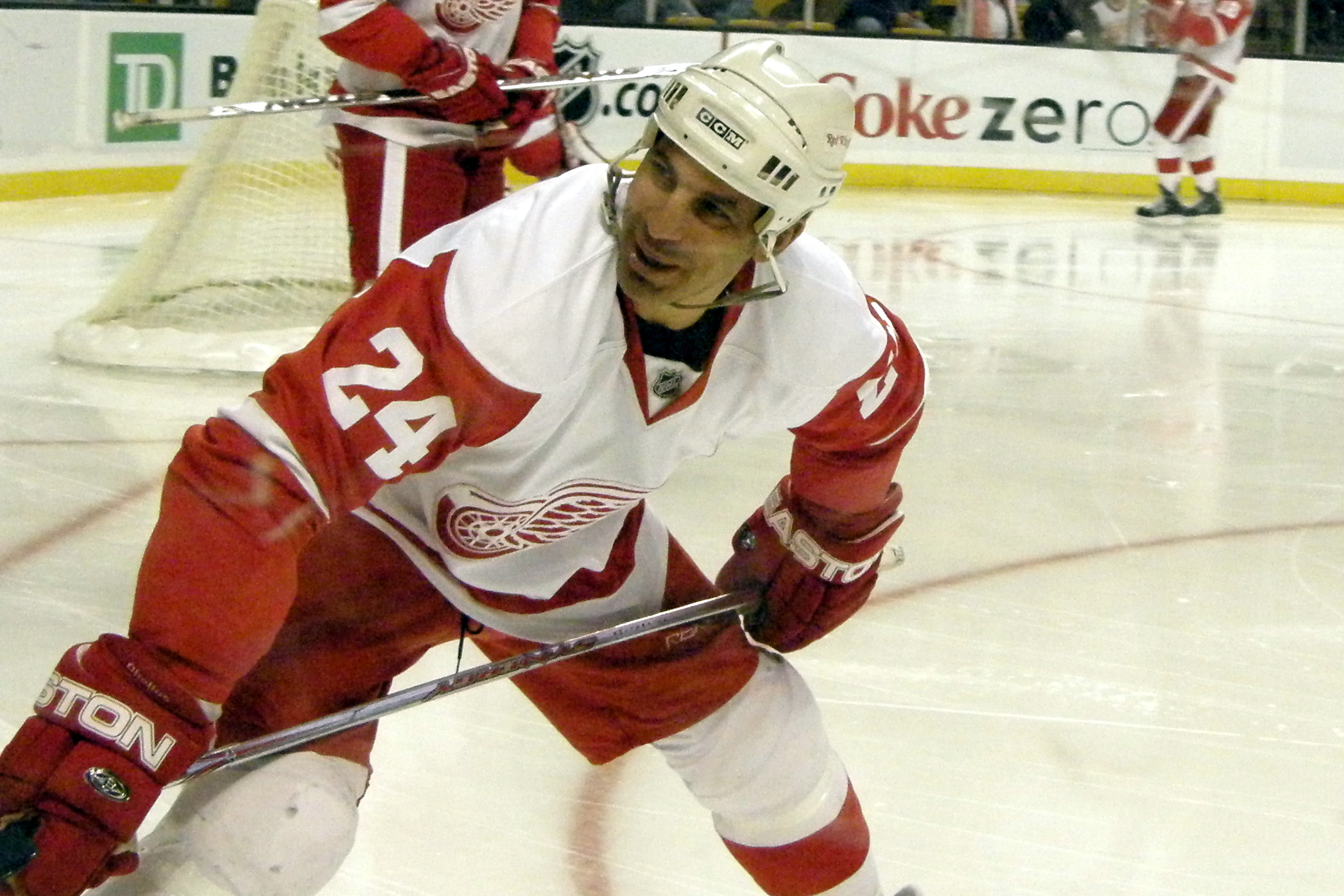
Chelios in action with Detroit in February 2008

In 2004, because of the cancellation of the NHL season, Chelios, along with fellow Red Wing teammates Derian Hatcher and Kris Draper, decided to play hockey for the Motor City Mechanics, a UHL team based out of Fraser, Michigan.In October 2004, he trained with the U.S. bobsled federation in a bid to compete for the Greek bobsled team at the 2006 Winter Olympics. While Chelios did not compete in the bobsled, he did captain the USA hockey team at the 2006 Winter Olympics in Turin, Italy.

On August 4, 2005, the 43-year-old re-signed with the Red Wings for a one-year contract. On May 24, 2006, Chelios re-signed a one-year contract with the Detroit Red Wings. On July 3, 2006, Chelios became the active leader for most games played upon the retirement of teammate Steve Yzerman. On April 21, 2007, he became the oldest defenseman to score a short-handed goal in the NHL in a playoff game against the Calgary Flames. Chelios was the captain of the US Olympic Hockey Team that played at the 2006 Winter Olympics in Turin, Italy. By participating in ice hockey at the 2006 Winter Olympics, Chelios set a new standard, by becoming the first player to take part in an Olympic ice hockey tournament twenty-two years after he played in his first. The old record was set by Swiss hockey player Bibi Torriani who had played twenty years after his debut (1928 and 1948).

Chelios re-signed with the Detroit Red Wings for the 2007–08 season. On January 8, 2008, Chelios became the second oldest player in the history of the NHL, at 45 years, 348 days, passing Moe Roberts. Only Gordie Howe, who played until age 52, was older. On April 12, 2008, Chelios played in his 248th playoff game, breaking the NHL record set by Hall of Fame goaltender Patrick Roy. Later that season, Chelios also became the oldest active player to win the Stanley Cup. He signed another one-year contract with the Red Wings for the 2008–09 season. On December 5, 2008, Chelios played in his first of two games for the Grand Rapids Griffins, the American Hockey League (AHL) farm club for the Red Wings, as part of a conditioning stint. At 46 years of age, he became the oldest player in the 73-year history of the AHL. At the conclusion of the 2008–09 season, he was a finalist for the Bill Masterton Memorial Trophy.

=== Chicago Wolves and Atlanta Thrashers ===
After the Red Wings announced that they would not be re-signing Chelios, he signed a 25-game tryout contract with the Chicago Wolves of the AHL. After a second 25-game pro tryout contract with the Wolves, Chelios signed a two-way contract with the Atlanta Thrashers. Chelios remained with the Wolves until he was recalled to the Thrashers, hoping that he could provide a spark for the team's playoff hopes. He played in seven games for the Thrashers, the first time in his career he did not play for an Original Six team, but failed to record any points. On April 7, 2010, Chelios was sent back to the Wolves.

=== Retirement, transition to Wings front office, and broadcasting ===
On August 31, 2010, Chelios officially retired. He was 48 years of age. The same day, Red Wings general manager Ken Holland announced that Chelios would be hired to work in the Red Wings' front office. He was named Adviser to Hockey Operations, with a role of working with Red Wings' defense prospects in Grand Rapids.

In 2013, it was announced that Chelios would become an NHL analyst on FS1, which also included covering the hockey tournament at the 2014 Winter Olympics. In 2016, Chelios, along with former Red Wings teammate Brett Hull, was added to ESPN's roster of analysts for their coverage of the 2016 World Cup of Hockey, which ESPN had picked up the U.S. broadcast rights to, after NBC pulled out due to scheduling conflicts.

In July 2018, Chelios announced that he was leaving the Detroit area, and the Red Wings front office, to return to Chicago to be close to his family. At the same time, the Chicago Blackhawks announced that Chelios was being brought on board to serve as an ambassador for the franchise. In 2021, after ESPN regained the rights to broadcast the NHL, Chelios rejoined the network for their coverage. Chelios served the same studio analyst role he held for the 2016 World Cup of Hockey, and sat alongside Mark Messier and P. K. Subban, joining Steve Levy for games on ESPN, ABC, and ESPN+. On June 5, 2023, it was announced that Chelios's contract would not be renewed as part of Disney's $5.5 billion cost cutting. Chelios later joined TNT as a guest studio analyst for their November 7 doubleheader.

The Blackhawks retired Chelios's no. 7 before their game against the Red Wings on February 25, 2024, making him the ninth Blackhawk to receive the honor.

== Coaching career ==
On June 17, 2015, USA Hockey named Chelios an assistant coach for Team USA at the 2016 World Junior Ice Hockey Championships. On June 23, 2015, Chelios was named to the Red Wings coaching staff, where he played a role in player development by working on-ice with the team's defensemen during practices. His job involved evaluating in-game player performance and offering his insight and observations to Red Wings bench coaches. He would also attend all home games, and on occasion, join the club on the road.

== International play ==
Chelios has participated in 11 international tournaments for the United States:

- 1980 World Junior Ice Hockey Championships
- 1982 World Junior Ice Hockey Championships
- 1984 Winter Olympics
- 1984 Canada Cup
- 1987 Canada Cup
- 1991 Canada Cup
- 1996 World Cup of Hockey (alternate captain)
- 1998 Winter Olympics (captain)
- 2002 Winter Olympics (captain)
- 2004 World Cup of Hockey (captain)
- 2006 Winter Olympics (captain)

In the 1998 Winter Olympics, after some members of the team damaged their rooms in the athletes village, Chelios apologized on behalf of the team and paid for the damages.

In 2020, Chelios was named into the IIHF All-Time USA Team.

== Personal life ==
Chelios attended Mount Carmel High School in Chicago before his family moved west, and then finished prep studies at Mira Mesa Senior High School in San Diego. He and his wife Tracee were married in 1987. They met while students at the University of Wisconsin–Madison. They have four children: Dean (born 1989), Jake (born 1991), Caley (born 1993), and Tara (born 1996). Dean Chelios, a forward for Cranbrook-Kingswood High School in Bloomfield Hills, Michigan, scored two power play goals helping his team win the 2006 Division III Michigan state high school hockey championship. Dean played for the Chicago Steel of the USHL in Bensenville, Illinois, and last played in 2016 for the Wichita Thunder of the ECHL. In May 2009, Jake was drafted 49th overall by the Chicago Steel and joined his brother at Michigan State University in East Lansing. Jake is a defenseman, like his father, and played with Kunlun Red Star of the KHL. Caley graduated from Northwestern University and is a reporter for the Chicago Blackhawks.

Chelios was active in charitable causes during his playing time in Chicago, founding Cheli's Children." He is the older brother of former minor-leaguer Steve Chelios, and cousin of former NHL player Nikos Tselios.

In 2004, Chelios and surfer Laird Hamilton trained with the U.S. bobsled team and hoped to form the first Greek bobsled team at the 2006 Winter Olympics. Chelios and his family stand-up paddle surf with Hamilton. Chelios credits the activity with helping him maintain his long career.

On Scrubs, Dr. Perry Cox, played by Chelios's friend John C. McGinley, often wears a Red Wings jersey with Chelios's name and number. During the fourth season of the show, which was concurrent with the 2004–05 lockout, Cox was seen on at least one occasion wearing a No. 24 "Motor City Mechanics" jersey. Chelios is also close friends with actors John Cusack and D. B. Sweeney, Pearl Jam frontman Eddie Vedder, Smashing Pumpkins frontman Billy Corgan, and musician Kid Rock. Chelios was sitting courtside with Kid Rock during the Pacers-Pistons brawl at the Palace of Auburn Hills on November 19, 2004. Chelios was a regular at Michigan State University hockey games, cheering on his sons Jake and Dean.

=== DUI arrest ===
On December 28, 2009, in Westmont, a southwest suburb of Chicago, Chelios was arrested for driving under the influence. He was the only occupant of the vehicle that was stopped at 4 a.m. The vehicle was towed and Chelios was taken to the Westmont station, where he was charged, processed, and posted bond. In March 2010, a judge reviewed the video tape of the arrest. The case was dismissed for lack of probable cause to stop, and evidence the tape provided that Chelios was not impaired. He was, however, fined for improper lane usage and speeding.

=== Malibu Mob ===
Chelios has a home in Malibu, California, and is well known as a member of the group of celebrity home owners and friends called the Malibu Mob. Other members include tennis player John McEnroe, big-wave surfer Laird Hamilton and his beach volleyball professional wife Gabrielle Reece, musicians Tim Commerford and Kid Rock, and actors John C. McGinley, John Cusack, Kelsey Grammer, Tony Danza, Justin Long, and Ed O'Neill.

== Business ==
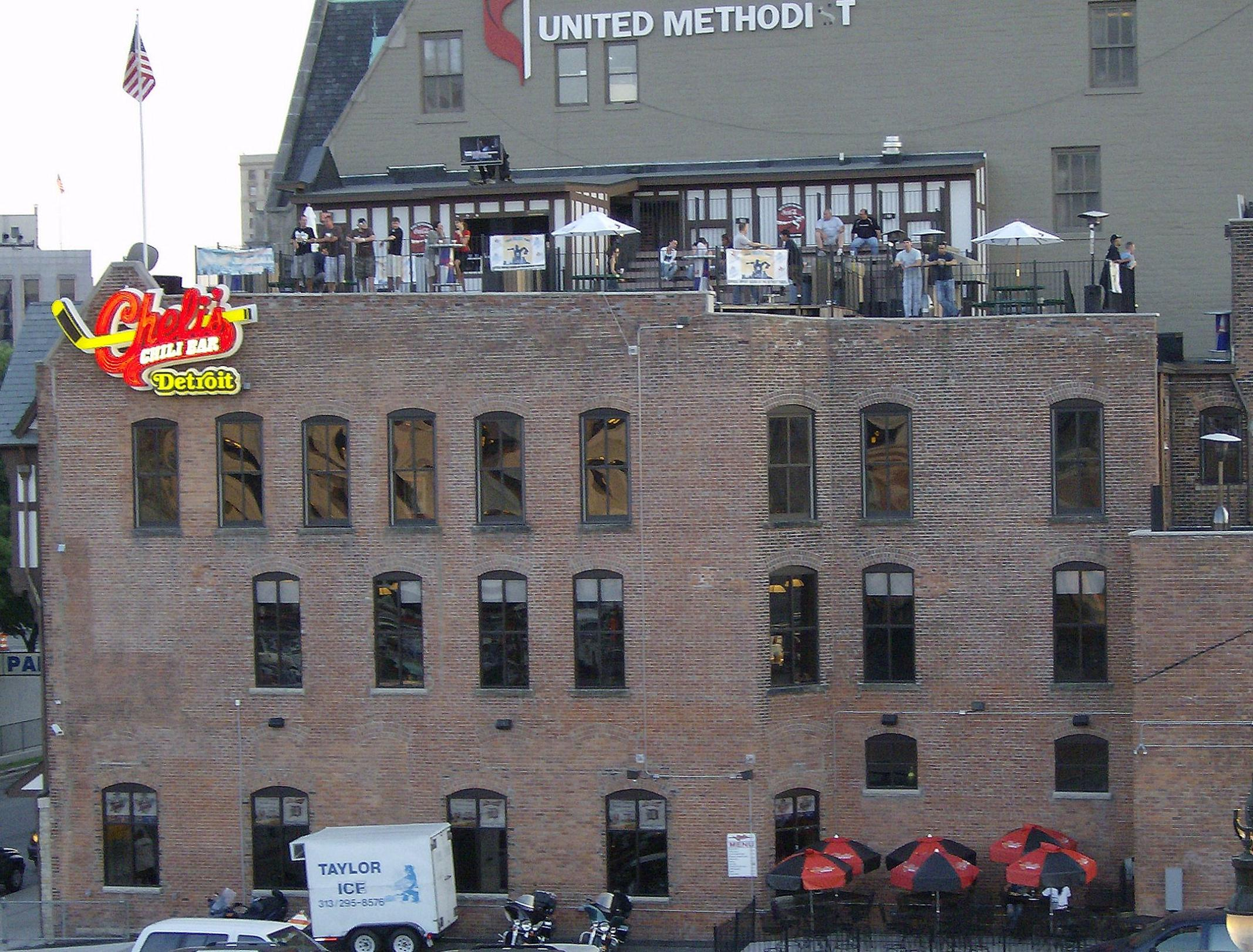
Chelios opened Cheli's Chili in downtown Detroit in 2006; it closed in November 2018, photo from September 2007.

Chelios has owned restaurant/bars in both the Chicago and Detroit areas with the name Cheli's Chili Bar. The first was on West Madison Street in Chicago (near the United Center) in the 1990s, but closed when he joined the Red Wings. A new Cheli's opened in Dearborn in 2003, followed by a second location in Detroit in 2006, and a third in Clinton Township in 2008. All of the restaurants are closed, with the Detroit location shuttering in November 2018 when Chelios returned to Chicago.

On January 2, 2007, two employees of Cheli's in Detroit were fatally stabbed: Megan Soroka, 49, a manager at the restaurant, and Mark Barnard, 52, a chef. Police arrested Justin Blackshere, 17, who confessed to the crime. He was a busboy at the restaurant and was fired in November 2006. Blackshere's pregnant girlfriend had also been fired from her job as a dishwasher. Chelios took a leave of absence from the Red Wings to help the victims' families. He said, "I'll come back when I feel ready and the families feel ready. I'm just going to try to get through this day by day with everybody." On January 9, 2007, the Red Wings announced that Chelios would playing that night. Blackshere was found guilty of murder in the first degree on August 22, 2007 and was sentenced to life in prison without parole on September 7, 2007.

== Career statistics ==
Bold italics indicate NHL record

=== Regular season and playoffs ===
			Regular season					Playoffs
Season	Team	League	GP	G	A	Pts	PIM	GP	G	A	Pts	PIM
1978–79	Moose Jaw Canucks	SJHL	24	3	16	19	68	—	—	—	—	—
1979–80	Moose Jaw Canucks	SJHL	53	12	31	42	118	—	—	—	—	—
1980–81	Moose Jaw Canucks	SJHL	54	23	64	87	175	—	—	—	—	—
1981–82	Wisconsin Badgers	WCHA	43	6	43	49	50	—	—	—	—	—
1982–83	Wisconsin Badgers	WCHA	45	16	32	48	62	—	—	—	—	—
1983–84	Montreal Canadiens	NHL	12	0	2	2	12	15	1	9	10	17
1984–85	Montreal Canadiens	NHL	74	9	55	64	87	9	2	8	10	17
1985–86	Montreal Canadiens	NHL	41	8	26	34	67	20	2	9	11	49
1986–87	Montreal Canadiens	NHL	71	11	33	44	124	17	4	9	13	38
1987–88	Montreal Canadiens	NHL	71	20	41	61	172	11	3	1	4	29
1988–89	Montreal Canadiens	NHL	80	15	58	73	185	21	4	15	19	28
1989–90	Montreal Canadiens	NHL	53	9	22	31	136	5	0	1	1	8
1990–91	Chicago Blackhawks	NHL	77	12	52	64	192	6	1	7	8	46
1991–92	Chicago Blackhawks	NHL	80	9	47	56	245	18	6	15	21	37
1992–93	Chicago Blackhawks	NHL	84	15	58	73	282	4	0	2	2	14
1993–94	Chicago Blackhawks	NHL	76	16	44	60	212	6	1	1	2	8
1994–95	EHC Biel	NDA	3	0	3	3	4	—	—	—	—	—
1994–95	Chicago Blackhawks	NHL	48	5	33	38	72	16	4	7	11	12
1995–96	Chicago Blackhawks	NHL	81	14	58	72	140	9	0	3	3	8
1996–97	Chicago Blackhawks	NHL	72	10	38	48	112	6	0	1	1	8
1997–98	Chicago Blackhawks	NHL	81	3	39	42	151	—	—	—	—	—
1998–99	Chicago Blackhawks	NHL	65	8	26	34	89	—	—	—	—	—
1998–99	Detroit Red Wings	NHL	10	1	1	2	4	10	0	4	4	14
1999–2000	Detroit Red Wings	NHL	81	3	31	34	103	9	0	1	1	8
2000–01	Detroit Red Wings	NHL	24	0	3	3	45	5	1	0	1	2
2001–02	Detroit Red Wings	NHL	79	6	33	39	126	23	1	13	14	44
2002–03	Detroit Red Wings	NHL	66	2	17	19	78	4	0	0	0	2
2003–04	Detroit Red Wings	NHL	69	2	19	21	61	8	0	1	1	4
2004–05	Motor City Mechanics	UHL	23	5	19	24	25	—	—	—	—	—
2005–06	Detroit Red Wings	NHL	81	4	7	11	108	6	0	0	0	6
2006–07	Detroit Red Wings	NHL	71	0	11	11	34	18	1	6	7	12
2007–08	Detroit Red Wings	NHL	69	3	9	12	36	14	0	0	0	10
2008–09	Detroit Red Wings	NHL	28	0	0	0	18	6	0	0	0	2
2008–09	Grand Rapids Griffins	AHL	2	0	1	1	2	—	—	—	—	—
2009–10	Chicago Wolves	AHL	46	5	17	22	24	14	0	0	0	12
2009–10	Atlanta Thrashers	NHL	7	0	0	0	2	—	—	—	—	—
NHL totals			1,651	185	763	948	2,891	266	31	113	144	423

=== International ===
Year	Team	Event	GP	G	A	Pts	PIM
1982	United States	WJC	7	1	2	3	10
1984	United States	OLY	6	0	3	3	8
1984	United States	CC	6	0	2	2	4
1987	United States	CC	5	0	2	2	2
1991	United States	CC	8	1	3	4	2
1996	United States	WCH	7	0	4	4	10
1998	United States	OLY	4	2	0	2	2
2002	United States	OLY	6	1	0	1	4
2004	United States	WCH	5	0	1	1	6
2006	United States	OLY	6	0	1	1	2
Junior totals			7	1	2	3	10
Senior totals			53	4	16	20	40

== Awards and honors ==
Award	Year	Ref
SJHL
Best Defenseman	1981	
College
All-WCHA Second Team	1983	
All-NCAA All-Tournament Team	1983	
NHL
NHL All-Rookie Team	1985	
NHL All-Star Game	1985, 1990, 1991, 1992, 1993, 1994, 1996, 1997, 1998, 2000, 2002	
Stanley Cup champion	1986 (Montreal), 2002, 2008 (Detroit)	
NHL All-Stars	Rendez-vous '87	
James Norris Memorial Trophy	1989, 1993, 1996	
NHL first All-Star team	1989, 1993, 1995, 1996, 2002	
NHL second All-Star team	1991, 1997	
NHL Plus-Minus Award (+40)	2002	
Mark Messier Leadership Award	2007	
International
IIHF Hall of Fame	2018	
IIHF All-Time USA Team	2020	

=== Records ===
- Most playoff games played (266)

== See also ==
- List of NHL players with 1,000 games played
- List of NHL players with 2,000 career penalty minutes

Sporting positions
Preceded by Peter Laviolette	US Men's Olympic Hockey Team Captain; 1998, 2002, 2006	Succeeded by Jamie Langenbrunner
Preceded by Dirk Graham	Chicago Blackhawks captain 1995–99	Succeeded by Doug Gilmour
Preceded by Bob Gainey	Montreal Canadiens captain 1989–90 with Guy Carbonneau	Succeeded by Guy Carbonneau
Awards and achievements
Preceded by Paul Coffey	Winner of the Norris Trophy; 1996	Succeeded by Brian Leetch
Preceded by Brian Leetch	Winner of the Norris Trophy; 1993	Succeeded by Ray Bourque
Preceded by Ray Bourque	Winner of the Norris Trophy; 1989	Succeeded by Ray Bourque
Preceded by Joe Sakic and Patrik Eliáš	Winner of the NHL Plus/Minus Award; 2002	Succeeded by Peter Forsberg and Milan Hejduk
