= Randy Velischek =

Canadian ice hockey player (born 1962)

- Born: February 10, 1962 (age 64) Montreal, Quebec, Canada
- Height: 6 ft 0 in (183 cm)
- Weight: 200 lb (91 kg; 14 st 4 lb)
- Position: Defence
- Shot: Left
- Played for: Minnesota North Stars; New Jersey Devils; Quebec Nordiques
- NHL draft: 53rd overall, 1980; Minnesota North Stars
- Playing career: 1983–1995

Randolph Velischek (born February 10, 1962) is a Canadian former professional ice hockey defenceman who played ten seasons in the National Hockey League for the Minnesota North Stars, New Jersey Devils, and Quebec Nordiques, and coached the Metropolitan Riveters of the National Women's Hockey League for one season. He was drafted 53rd overall by the North Stars in the 1980 NHL entry draft and played 509 career NHL games, scoring 21 goals and 97 points.

== Playing career ==
Velischek was born in Montreal, Quebec. As a youth, he played in the 1974 and 1975 Quebec International Pee-Wee Hockey Tournaments with a minor ice hockey team from Mount Royal, Quebec. He spent his junior hockey career with the Lac St-Louis Lions of the Quebec Amateur Hockey Association and the Verdun Éperviers of the Quebec Major Junior Hockey League. After his junior career ended, Velischek played four years of college hockey for the Providence Friars from 1979 to 1983.

In addition to playing in the NHL, Velischek played professionally in the American Hockey League for the Springfield Indians, Maine Mariners, Halifax Citadels, and Cornwall Aces, the International Hockey League for the Milwaukee Admirals, the Central Hockey League for the Salt Lake Golden Eagles, and the British Hockey League for the Durham Wasps.

== Life after hockey ==
From 1995 to 2006, Velischek served as a broadcaster for the New Jersey Devils on ABC Radio and WFAN-AM.

Beginning in 2007–08 school year, Velischek taught at the Pingry School as a German and French teacher and coached middle school ice hockey. On June 11, 2009, Velischeck was hired as the boy's high school ice hockey coach at Morristown-Beard School. Along with coaching at Morristown-Beard School, Velischek was also the hockey director at Twin Oaks Ice Rink in Morristown, New Jersey, and runs RJV Hockey School.

On September 20, 2018, he was named the head coach of the New Jersey Devils-associated Metropolitan Riveters of the National Women's Hockey League, based in Newark, New Jersey, despite not having any previous experience in women's hockey. He was not retained for the 2019–20 season after the Devils severed ties with the Riveters and the team performed disappointingly.

== Career statistics ==
| | | | Regular season | | | | | Playoffs |
| Season | Team | League | GP | G | A | Pts | PIM | GP | G | A | Pts | PIM |
|---|---|---|---|---|---|---|---|---|---|---|---|---|
| 1977–78 | Lac-St-Louis Lions | QMAAA | 26 | 3 | 25 | 28 | 14 | 7 | 5 | 3 | 8 | 6 |
| 1978–79 | Lac-St-Louis Lions | QMAAA | 39 | 13 | 31 | 44 | 47 | 9 | 3 | 8 | 11 | 10 |
| 1978–79 | Verdun Eperviers | QMJHL | — | — | — | — | — | 4 | 0 | 1 | 1 | 0 |
| 1979–80 | Providence College | NCAA | 31 | 5 | 5 | 10 | 20 | — | — | — | — | — |
| 1980–81 | Providence College | NCAA | 33 | 3 | 12 | 15 | 26 | — | — | — | — | — |
| 1981–82 | Providence College | NCAA | 33 | 1 | 14 | 15 | 38 | — | — | — | — | — |
| 1982–83 | Providence College | NCAA | 41 | 18 | 34 | 52 | 50 | — | — | — | — | — |
| 1982–83 | Minnesota North Stars | NHL | 3 | 0 | 0 | 0 | 2 | 9 | 0 | 0 | 0 | 0 |
| 1983–84 | Salt Lake Golden Eagles | CHL | 43 | 7 | 21 | 28 | 54 | 5 | 0 | 3 | 3 | 2 |
| 1983–84 | Minnesota North Stars | NHL | 33 | 2 | 2 | 4 | 10 | 1 | 0 | 0 | 0 | 0 |
| 1984–85 | Springfield Indians | AHL | 26 | 2 | 7 | 9 | 22 | — | — | — | — | — |
| 1984–85 | Minnesota North Stars | NHL | 52 | 4 | 9 | 13 | 26 | 9 | 2 | 3 | 5 | 8 |
| 1985–86 | Maine Mariners | AHL | 21 | 0 | 4 | 4 | 4 | — | — | — | — | — |
| 1985–86 | New Jersey Devils | NHL | 47 | 2 | 7 | 9 | 39 | — | — | — | — | — |
| 1986–87 | New Jersey Devils | NHL | 64 | 2 | 16 | 18 | 52 | — | — | — | — | — |
| 1987–88 | New Jersey Devils | NHL | 51 | 3 | 9 | 12 | 66 | 19 | 0 | 2 | 2 | 20 |
| 1988–89 | New Jersey Devils | NHL | 80 | 4 | 14 | 18 | 70 | — | — | — | — | — |
| 1989–90 | New Jersey Devils | NHL | 62 | 0 | 6 | 6 | 72 | 6 | 0 | 0 | 0 | 4 |
| 1990–91 | Quebec Nordiques | NHL | 79 | 2 | 10 | 12 | 42 | — | — | — | — | — |
| 1991–92 | Halifax Citadels | AHL | 16 | 3 | 6 | 9 | 0 | — | — | — | — | — |
| 1991–92 | Quebec Nordiques | NHL | 38 | 2 | 3 | 5 | 22 | — | — | — | — | — |
| 1992–93 | Halifax Citadels | AHL | 49 | 6 | 16 | 22 | 18 | — | — | — | — | — |
| 1993–94 | Milwaukee Admirals | IHL | 53 | 7 | 11 | 18 | 28 | 4 | 0 | 0 | 0 | 2 |
| 1993–94 | Cornwall Aces | AHL | 18 | 1 | 6 | 7 | 17 | — | — | — | — | — |
| 1994–95 | Milwaukee Admirals | IHL | 35 | 3 | 3 | 6 | 24 | 12 | 2 | 2 | 4 | 6 |
| NHL totals | | | 509 | 21 | 76 | 97 | 401 | 44 | 2 | 5 | 7 | 32 |

== Awards and honors ==
| Award | Year |
|---|---|
| All-ECAC Hockey All-Star Team of The 1980s Second Team | 1979-83 |
| All-ECAC | 1981–82 |
| ECAC Second All-Star Team | 1981–82 |
| NCAA (All-East) Senior All-Stars | 1982–83 |
| All-ECAC | 1982–83 |
| ECAC First All-Star Team | 1982–83 |
| ECAC Player of The Year | 1982–83 |
| NCAA (New England)-All New England | 1982–83 |
| AHCA East All-American | 1982–83 |

Awards and achievements
| Preceded by Steve Cruickshank | ECAC Hockey Player of the Year; 1982–83 | Succeeded by Cleon Daskalakis |
