= Patrick Flatley =

Canadian ice hockey player (born 1963)

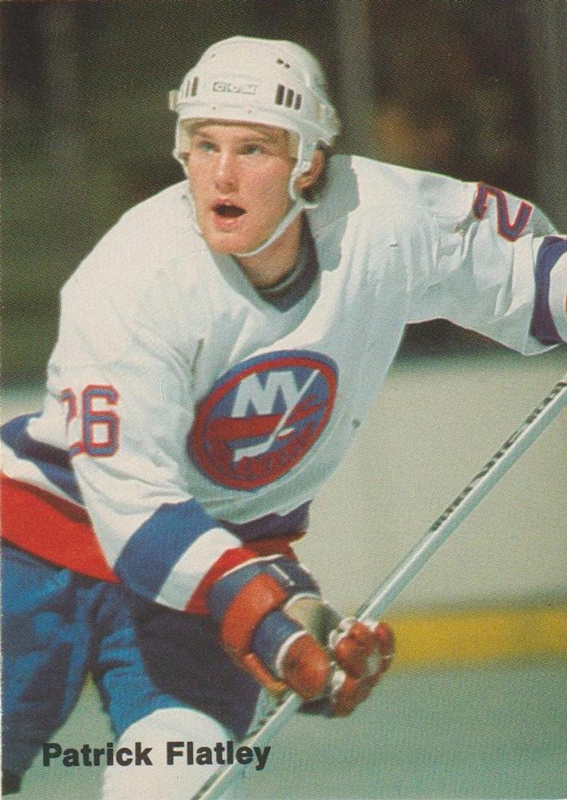
- Born: October 3, 1963 (age 62) Toronto, Ontario, Canada
- Height: 6 ft 2 in (188 cm)
- Weight: 195 lb (88 kg; 13 st 13 lb)
- Position: Right wing
- Shot: Right
- Played for: New York Islanders; New York Rangers
- National team: Canada
- NHL draft: 21st overall, 1982; New York Islanders
- Playing career: 1983–1997

Patrick William Flatley (born October 3, 1963) is a Canadian former professional ice hockey played who played in the National Hockey League (NHL) for 14 seasons between 1983 and 1997 for the New York Islanders and New York Rangers.

== Playing career ==
Flatley was born in Toronto. As a youth, he played in the 1976 Quebec International Pee-Wee Hockey Tournament with the Toronto Shopsy's minor ice hockey team. He attended the University of Wisconsin at Madison, where he played for the Wisconsin Badgers men's ice hockey team for two seasons, helping the team capture the 1983 NCAA national championship, and was himself named a tournament all-star, a WCHA first team all-star, and a 1983 All-American.

Flatley was drafted 21st overall by the New York Islanders in the 1982 NHL entry draft, and scored on his first NHL shot on goal, against Doug Soetaert of the Winnipeg Jets. Playing for the Canadian National Team in 1983–84, he scored 34 goals in 54 games. Rejoining the Islanders for the 1984-85 season, he was put on a line with Brent Sutter and Clark Gillies, and scored 9 goals through the first three rounds of the playoffs, becoming a contributor in the Islanders' drive for their fifth consecutive Stanley Cup. The Islanders lost in the finals, however, to the Wayne Gretzky-led Edmonton Oilers.

Flatley was sometimes referred to as "the chairman of the boards" because he rarely failed to dig the puck out in battles in the corners. In 1991 he was named the Islanders' fifth captain. Prior to the 1996-97 season, Flatley signed a one-year deal with the New York Rangers on September 6, 1996. He played 780 career NHL games, scoring 170 goals and 340 assists for 510 points. His best offensive season, points-wise, was the 1992–93 season when he scored 47 assists and 60 points. On January 15, 2012 Flatley was the 12th player inducted into the New York Islanders Hall of Fame. He was also named to the Etobicoke Sports Hall of Fame in 2007.

== Personal life ==
He is the father-in-law of Jake Evans who plays for the Montreal Canadiens.

== Career statistics ==
=== Regular season and playoffs ===
			Regular season					Playoffs
Season	Team	League	GP	G	A	Pts	PIM	GP	G	A	Pts	PIM
1980–81	Henry Carr Crusaders	MetJHL	42	30	61	91	122	—	—	—	—	—
1981–82	University of Wisconsin	WCHA	33	17	20	37	65	—	—	—	—	—
1982–83	University of Wisconsin	WCHA	43	25	44	69	76	—	—	—	—	—
1983–84	Canada	Intl	57	31	17	48	136	—	—	—	—	—
1983–84	New York Islanders	NHL	16	2	7	9	6	21	9	6	15	14
1984–85	New York Islanders	NHL	78	20	31	51	106	4	1	0	1	6
1985–86	New York Islanders	NHL	73	18	34	52	66	3	0	0	0	21
1986–87	New York Islanders	NHL	63	16	35	51	81	11	3	2	5	6
1987–88	New York Islanders	NHL	40	9	15	24	26	—	—	—	—	—
1988–89	Springfield Indians	AHL	2	1	1	2	2	—	—	—	—	—
1988–89	New York Islanders	NHL	41	10	15	25	31	—	—	—	—	—
1989–90	New York Islanders	NHL	62	17	32	49	101	5	3	0	3	2
1990–91	New York Islanders	NHL	56	20	25	45	74	—	—	—	—	—
1991–92	New York Islanders	NHL	38	8	28	36	31	—	—	—	—	—
1992–93	New York Islanders	NHL	80	13	47	60	63	15	2	7	9	12
1993–94	New York Islanders	NHL	64	12	30	42	40	—	—	—	—	—
1994–95	New York Islanders	NHL	45	7	20	27	12	—	—	—	—	—
1995–96	New York Islanders	NHL	56	8	9	17	21	—	—	—	—	—
1996–97	New York Rangers	NHL	68	10	12	22	26	11	0	0	0	14
NHL totals			780	170	340	510	686	70	18	15	33	75

=== International ===
Medal record

Men's ice hockey

Representing Canada

World Championships
Bronze medal – third place	1983 West Germany	

Year	Team	Event	GP	G	A	Pts	PIM
1983	Canada	WJC	7	4	0	4	6
1983	Canada	WC	6	0	0	0	2
1984	Canada	OG	7	3	3	6	20
Senior totals			13	3	3	6	22

== Awards an honours ==
Award	Year	Ref
All-WCHA First Team	1982–83	
AHCA West All-American	1982–83	
All-NCAA All-Tournament Team	1983	

Sporting positions
Preceded by Paul Boutilier	New York Islanders first-round draft pick 1982	Succeeded by Pat LaFontaine
Preceded by Brent Sutter	New York Islanders captain 1991–96	Succeeded by Bryan McCabe
