= Scott Bjugstad =

American ice hockey player (born 1961)

- Born: June 2, 1961 (age 65) Saint Paul, Minnesota, U.S.
- Height: 6 ft 1 in (185 cm)
- Weight: 185 lb (84 kg; 13 st 3 lb)
- Position: Right wing
- Shot: Left
- Played for: Minnesota North Stars; Pittsburgh Penguins; Los Angeles Kings
- National team: United States
- NHL draft: 181st overall, 1981; Minnesota North Stars
- Playing career: 1983–1993

Barry Scott Bjugstad (/ˈbjuːɡstæd/ BEWG-stad; born June 2, 1961) is an American retired professional ice hockey forward who played 317 games in the National Hockey League between 1984 and 1992.

== Playing career ==
He played for the Minnesota North Stars, Pittsburgh Penguins, and Los Angeles Kings. He was also a member of the United States national hockey team in the 1984 Winter Olympics before turning professional.

During high school, Scott Bjugstad lived in New Brighton, MN where he attended Irondale High School and helped lead the Knights hockey team to playoff victories. After high school, he went on to a successful college career with the University of Minnesota Golden Gophers.

== Career statistics ==
=== Regular season and playoffs ===
			Regular season					Playoffs
Season	Team	League	GP	G	A	Pts	PIM	GP	G	A	Pts	PIM
1977–78	Irondale High School	HS-MN	—	—	—	—	—	—	—	—	—	—
1978–79	Irondale High School	HS-MN	—	48	32	80	—	—	—	—	—	—
1979–80	University of Minnesota	WCHA	18	2	2	4	2	—	—	—	—	—
1980–81	University of Minnesota	WCHA	35	12	13	25	34	—	—	—	—	—
1981–82	University of Minnesota	WCHA	36	29	14	43	24	—	—	—	—	—
1982–83	University of Minnesota	WCHA	44	43	48	91	30	—	—	—	—	—
1983–84	United States National Team	Intl	54	31	20	51	28	—	—	—	—	—
1983–84	Minnesota North Stars	NHL	5	0	0	0	2	—	—	—	—	—
1983–84	Salt Lake Golden Eagles	CHL	15	10	8	18	6	5	3	4	7	0
1984–85	Springfield Indians	AHL	5	2	3	5	2	—	—	—	—	—
1984–85	Minnesota North Stars	NHL	72	11	4	15	32	—	—	—	—	—
1985–86	Minnesota North Stars	NHL	80	43	33	76	24	5	0	1	1	0
1986–87	Springfield Indians	AHL	11	6	4	10	7	—	—	—	—	—
1986–87	Minnesota North Stars	NHL	39	4	9	13	43	—	—	—	—	—
1987–88	Minnesota North Stars	NHL	33	10	12	22	15	—	—	—	—	—
1988–89	Kalamazoo Wings	IHL	4	5	0	5	4	—	—	—	—	—
1988–89	Pittsburgh Penguins	NHL	24	3	0	3	4	—	—	—	—	—
1989–90	New Haven Nighthawks	AHL	47	45	21	66	40	—	—	—	—	—
1989–90	Los Angeles Kings	NHL	11	1	2	3	2	2	0	0	0	2
1990–91	Los Angeles Kings	NHL	31	2	4	6	12	2	0	0	0	0
1990–91	Phoenix Roadrunners	IHL	3	7	2	9	2	—	—	—	—	—
1991–92	Los Angeles Kings	NHL	22	2	4	6	10	—	—	—	—	—
1991–92	Phoenix Roadrunners	IHL	28	14	14	28	12	—	—	—	—	—
1992–93	Phoenix Roadrunners	IHL	7	5	4	9	4	—	—	—	—	—
NHL totals			317	76	68	144	144	9	0	1	1	2

=== International ===
Year	Team	Event	Results	GP	G	A	Pts	PIM
1984	United States	OG	6th	6	3	1	4	6

== Awards and honors ==
Award	Year
All-WCHA First Team	1982–83

== Personal life ==
He is the uncle of Nick Bjugstad.
