= Bruce Driver =

Canadian ice hockey player

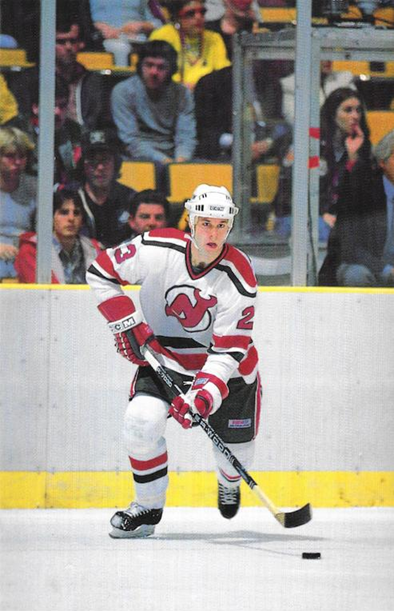
- Born: April 29, 1962 (age 64) Etobicoke, Ontario, Canada
- Height: 6 ft 0 in (183 cm)
- Weight: 185 lb (84 kg; 13 st 3 lb)
- Position: Defence
- Shot: Left
- Played for: New Jersey Devils; New York Rangers
- National team: Canada
- NHL draft: 108th overall, 1981; Colorado Rockies
- Playing career: 1983–1998

Bruce Douglas Driver (born April 29, 1962) is a Canadian former professional ice hockey defenceman who played 15 seasons in the National Hockey League from 1983–84 until 1997–98.

== Early life ==
When he was 12, Driver played in the 1975 Quebec International Pee-Wee Hockey Tournament with the MTHL's Shopsy's, a youth team affiliated with the Toronto Marlies.

When he was 13, Driver was cut from his bantam team because evaluators thought he was too small. Undeterred, he continued to improve his game, and was later drafted by the Oshawa Generals, a major junior team in the Ontario Hockey League, but decided to play college hockey at the University of Wisconsin instead. In his 3 years with the Badgers, the team won 2 NCAA Championships. Driver was team captain by his second year and an NCAA All-Star.

Before he began his NHL career, Driver also played for Team Canada at the 1984 Winter Olympics in Sarajevo. Team Canada advanced to the medal round, but lost the next two games to the Soviet Union and Sweden, and did not make the podium. Driver was Team Canada's top-scoring defenceman.

== Professional career ==
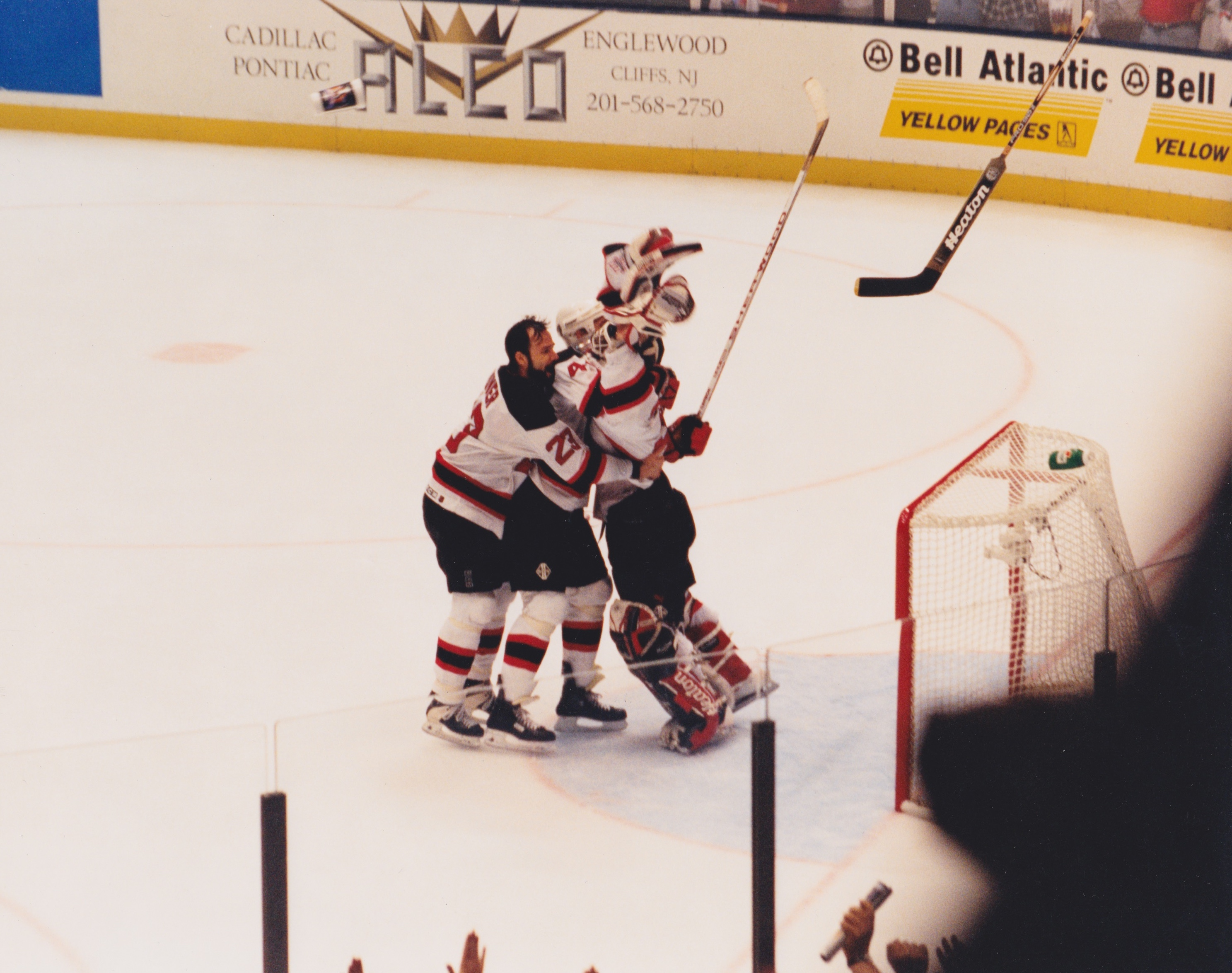
Driver (#23 to the left), moments after the New Jersey Devils won the Stanley Cup in 1995.

Driver was drafted in the sixth round (108th overall) by the Colorado Rockies (who became the Devils in 1982) in the 1981 NHL entry draft. He spent the first 11 years of his NHL career with the Devils, winning a Stanley Cup with them in 1995. He was signed by the New York Rangers after the 1995 season.

Driver was the Devils team captain during the 1991-92 season; fellow defenseman Scott Stevens took over as captain the following year. From 1987 onwards, he was a regular on his teams' top power play lines. He left the Devils as the all-time leader in assists by a defenseman, with 317, a record later broken by Stevens. Between 1987 and the end of his career, over half of his goals came on the power play.

== Personal life ==
Driver is a resident of Montville, New Jersey. He enjoys playing hockey as a goalie in an adult recreational leagues in New Jersey and coaches a girls' high-school hockey team at Morristown-Beard School that won a state championship in the 2019-20 season. He was also the girls' high-school Hockey Coach of the Year in New Jersey in 2006–07.

Driver is currently a manager at Twin Oaks Ice Rink in Morristown, NJ.

== Awards and honors ==
Award	Year
All-WCHA First Team	1981–82
AHCA West All-American	1981–82
All-NCAA All-Tournament Team	1982
All-WCHA Second Team	1982–83

== Career statistics ==
=== Regular season and playoffs ===
			Regular season					Playoffs
Season	Team	League	GP	G	A	Pts	PIM	GP	G	A	Pts	PIM
1978–79	Royal York Royals	OPJHL	49	10	32	42	—	—	—	—	—	—
1979–80	Royal York Royals	OPJHL	43	13	57	70	102	—	—	—	—	—
1980–81	University of Wisconsin	WCHA	42	5	15	20	42	—	—	—	—	—
1981–82	University of Wisconsin	WCHA	46	7	37	44	84	—	—	—	—	—
1982–83	University of Wisconsin	WCHA	39	16	34	50	50	—	—	—	—	—
1983–84	Canadian National Team	Intl	68	14	18	32	54	—	—	—	—	—
1983–84	New Jersey Devils	NHL	4	0	2	2	0	—	—	—	—	—
1983–84	Maine Mariners	AHL	12	2	6	8	15	16	0	10	10	8
1984–85	New Jersey Devils	NHL	67	9	23	32	36	—	—	—	—	—
1985–86	New Jersey Devils	NHL	40	3	15	18	32	—	—	—	—	—
1985–86	Maine Mariners	AHL	15	4	7	11	16	—	—	—	—	—
1986–87	New Jersey Devils	NHL	74	6	28	34	36	—	—	—	—	—
1987–88	New Jersey Devils	NHL	74	15	40	55	68	20	3	7	10	14
1988–89	New Jersey Devils	NHL	27	1	15	16	24	—	—	—	—	—
1989–90	New Jersey Devils	NHL	75	7	46	53	63	6	1	5	6	6
1990–91	New Jersey Devils	NHL	73	9	36	45	62	7	1	2	3	12
1991–92	New Jersey Devils	NHL	78	7	35	42	66	7	0	4	4	2
1992–93	New Jersey Devils	NHL	83	14	40	54	66	5	1	3	4	4
1993–94	New Jersey Devils	NHL	66	8	24	32	63	20	3	5	8	12
1994–95	New Jersey Devils	NHL	41	4	12	16	18	17	1	6	7	8
1995–96	New York Rangers	NHL	66	3	34	37	42	11	0	7	7	4
1996–97	New York Rangers	NHL	79	5	25	30	48	15	0	1	1	2
1997–98	New York Rangers	NHL	75	5	15	20	46	—	—	—	—	—
NHL totals			922	96	390	486	670	108	10	40	50	64

=== International ===
Year	Team	Event	GP	G	A	Pts	PIM
1984	Canada	OLY	7	3	1	4	10
1987	Canada	WC	8	0	0	0	4
Senior totals			15	3	1	4	14

Sporting positions
Preceded by Kirk Muller	New Jersey Devils captain 1991–92	Succeeded by Scott Stevens
