= 1983 ECAC Hockey men's ice hockey tournament =

1983 ECAC Men's ice hockey tournament
- Dates: March 4–12, 1983
- Teams: 8
- Finals site: Boston Garden; Boston, Massachusetts
- Champions: Harvard (2nd title)
- Winning coach: Bill Cleary (1st title)
- MVP: Mitch Olson (Harvard)
- ECAC Men's Ice Hockey Tournaments

The 1983 ECAC Hockey Men's Ice Hockey Tournament was the 22nd tournament in league history. It was played between March 4 and March 12, 1983. Quarterfinal games were played at home team campus sites, while the 'final four' games were played at the Boston Garden in Boston, Massachusetts. By winning the tournament, Harvard received the ECAC's automatic bid to the 1983 NCAA Division I Men's Ice Hockey Tournament.

== Format ==
The tournament featured three rounds of play. The three teams that were division champions automatically qualified for the tournament while the remaining five seeds were given to the teams with the highest winning percentage. The top four seeds were given out to the three division champions and the top qualifier and assorted based on winning percentage. The remaining four seeds were assigned to the other qualifiers and assorted based upon winning percentage. In the quarterfinals, the first seed and eighth seed, the second seed and seventh seed, the third seed and sixth seed, and the fourth seed and fifth seed played a two-game series to determine the winner. In the two games no overtime was permitted and if the two teams remained tied after the two games then a 10-minute mini-game would be played where a sudden-death overtime was allowed if the scheduled time did not produce a victor. After the opening round every series becomes a single-elimination game. In the semifinals, the highest seed plays the lowest remaining seed while the two remaining teams play with the winners advancing to the championship game and the losers advancing to the third place game. The tournament champion receives an automatic bid to the 1983 NCAA Division I Men's Ice Hockey Tournament.

== Conference standings ==
Note: GP = Games played; W = Wins; L = Losses; T = Ties; Pct. = Winning percentage; GF = Goals for; GA = Goals against

1982–83 ECAC Hockey standings
	Conference							Overall					
	GP	W	L	T	Pct.	GF	GA	GP	W	L	T	GF	GA
East Region
Providence†	21	16	5	0	.762	111	86	43	33	10	0	225	143
New Hampshire	21	15	5	1	.738	109	79	35	22	11	2	180	137
Boston University	21	14	7	0	.667	94	77	30	18	11	1	125	107
Boston College	21	9	10	2	.476	85	80	30	15	13	2	140	114
Northeastern	21	9	11	1	.452	87	87	28	13	14	1	129	122
Maine	21	1	20	0	.048	71	140	29	5	24	0	105	168
West Region
St. Lawrence	20	14	6	0	.700	89	78	36	23	12	1	147	131
Clarkson	20	13	6	1	.675	104	67	31	19	11	1	155	104
Rensselaer	20	13	7	0	.650	122	90	29	18	11	0	167	130
Colgate	20	9	9	2	.500	89	81	28	15	10	3	152	114
Vermont	20	3	16	1	.175	60	106	28	6	21	1	89	148
Ivy Region
Harvard*	21	15	5	1	.738	113	67	34	23	9	2	177	105
Yale	21	12	9	0	.571	104	70	28	14	14	0	123	90
Cornell	21	10	8	3	.548	83	79	26	13	10	3	109	100
Princeton	21	7	12	2	.381	85	106	25	9	14	2	102	121
Dartmouth	21	6	14	1	.310	85	119	26	9	15	2	115	141
Brown	21	2	18	1	.119	53	127	25	3	21	1	70	145
Independent
Army^	-	-	-	-	-	-	-	37	25	11	1	218	137
Championship: Harvard † indicates conference regular season champion * indicates conference tournament champion^ Army had been accepted into ECAC Hockey but had not begun a conference schedule

== Bracket ==
Teams are reseeded after the first round

Quarterfinals; March 4–5
1	Providence	2	2	—
8	Yale	1	1	—
2	Harvard	5	4	—
7	Rensselaer	1	2	—
(Pairings are reseeded after the first round)
3	New Hampshire	3	6	—
6	Boston University	3	2	—
4	St. Lawrence	5	1	3
5	Clarkson	3	2	0

Semifinals; March 11
1	Providence	1
4	St. Lawrence	0
2	Harvard	6
3	New Hampshire	3

Championship; March 12
1	Providence	1
2	Harvard	4
Third Place
3	New Hampshire	5
4	St. Lawrence	2

Note: * denotes overtime period(s)

=== Quarterfinals ===
==== (1) Providence vs. (8) Yale ====
March 4	Providence	2 – 1	Yale	Schneider Arena

March 5	Providence	2 – 1	Yale	Schneider Arena

Providence won series 2–0

==== (2) Harvard vs. (7) Rensselaer ====
March 4	Harvard	5 – 1	Rensselaer	Bright Hockey Center

March 5	Harvard	4 – 2	Rensselaer	Bright Hockey Center

Harvard won series 2–0

==== (3) New Hampshire vs. (6) Boston University ====
March 4	New Hampshire	3 – 3	Boston University	Snively Arena

March 5	New Hampshire	6 – 3	Boston University	Snively Arena

New Hampshire won series 1–0–1

==== (4) St. Lawrence vs. (5) Clarkson ====
March 4	St. Lawrence	5 – 3	Clarkson	Appleton Arena

March 5	St. Lawrence	1 – 2	Clarkson	Appleton Arena

March 5	St. Lawrence	3 – 0 (mini)	Clarkson	Appleton Arena

St. Lawrence won series 2–1

=== Semifinals ===
==== (1) Providence vs. (4) St. Lawrence ====
March 11	Providence	1 – 0	St. Lawrence	Boston Garden

==== (2) Harvard vs. (3) New Hampshire ====
March 11	Harvard	6 – 3	New Hampshire	Boston Garden

=== Third Place ===
==== (3) New Hampshire vs. (4) St. Lawrence ====
March 12	New Hampshire	5 – 2	St. Lawrence	Boston Garden

=== Championship ===
==== (1) Providence vs. (2) Harvard ====
March 12	Providence	1 – 4	Harvard	Boston Garden

== Tournament awards ==
=== All-Tournament Team ===
None

=== MOP ===
- Mitch Olson (Harvard)
