= 1982–83 NCAA Division I men's ice hockey season =

- Duration: October 1982– March 26, 1983
- NCAA tournament: 1983
- National championship: Winter Sports Center; Grand Forks, North Dakota
- NCAA champion: Wisconsin
- Hobey Baker Award: Mark Fusco (Harvard)

The 1982–83 NCAA Division I men's ice hockey season began in October 1982 and concluded with the 1983 NCAA Division I Men's Ice Hockey Tournament's championship game on March 26, 1983 at the Winter Sports Center in Grand Forks, North Dakota. This was the 36th season in which an NCAA ice hockey championship was held and is the 89th year overall where an NCAA school fielded a team.

== Season Outlook ==
=== Pre-season polls ===
The top teams in the nation.

The WMPL poll was voted on by coaches before the start of the season.

Drew Finnie, sports information director at the University of Maine, founded the College Hockey Statistics Bureau (CHSB). With help from radio station WDOM of Providence, Rhode Island, the CHSB compiled and released a poll as ranked by the media.

The College Hockey Statistics Bureau (CHSB) / WDOM poll was voted on by media after the season started.

WMPL Poll
Rank	Team
1	Minnesota (7)
2	Michigan State (2)
3	Providence
4	Bowling Green
5	North Dakota (1)
6	Minnesota Duluth
7	Wisconsin
8	New Hampshire
9	Harvard
10	Ohio State

CHSB / WDOM Poll
Rank	Team
1	Minnesota Duluth (8)
2	Minnesota
3	Providence
4	Wisconsin
5	Bowling Green (1)
6 (tie)	Michigan State
6 (tie)	Clarkson
8	Northern Michigan
9	Michigan Tech
10	St. Lawrence

== Regular season ==
=== Season tournaments ===
Tournament	Dates	Teams	Champion
Empire Cup	November 12–13	4	Clarkson
Jeno Holiday Tournament	December 28–29	4	Harvard
KeyBank Tournament	December 28–29	4	St. Lawrence
Schooner Cup	December 28–29	4	Providence
Broadmoor Classic	December 29–30	4	Colorado College
Great Lakes Invitational	December 29–30	4	Michigan State
Rensselaer Holiday Tournament	December 29–30	4	Rensselaer
Syracuse Invitational	December 29–30	4	Boston University
Auld Lang Syne Classic	December 30–31	4	New Hampshire
Beanpot	February 8, 14	4	Boston College

=== Standings ===
1982–83 Central Collegiate Hockey Association standings
	Conference							Overall					
	GP	W	L	T	PTS	GF	GA	GP	W	L	T	GF	GA
Bowling Green†	32	24	5	3	51	200	115	40	28	8	4	238	143
Michigan State*	32	23	9	0	46	132	83	42	30	11	1	187	115
Ohio State	32	21	7	4	46	159	107	40	26	9	5	204	140
Michigan Tech	32	20	12	0	40	162	124	40	22	17	1	189	157
Northern Michigan	32	16	13	3	35	125	113	40	18	18	4	147	153
Miami	32	15	16	1	31	136	142	36	18	17	1	165	156
Ferris State	32	12	16	4	28	139	145	38	16	18	4	141	161
Notre Dame	32	13	17	2	28	141	170	36	13	21	2	155	206
Michigan	32	11	21	0	22	124	161	36	14	22	0	157	175
Western Michigan	32	10	20	2	22	105	135	36	11	23	2	117	156
Lake Superior State	32	10	21	1	21	110	140	36	12	23	1	131	157
Illinois-Chicago	32	6	24	2	14	82	160	36	6	28	2	95	185
Championship: Michigan State † indicates conference regular season champion * indicates conference tournament champion

1982–83 ECAC Hockey standings
	Conference							Overall					
	GP	W	L	T	Pct.	GF	GA	GP	W	L	T	GF	GA
East Region
Providence†	21	16	5	0	.762	111	86	43	33	10	0	225	143
New Hampshire	21	15	5	1	.738	109	79	35	22	11	2	180	137
Boston University	21	14	7	0	.667	94	77	30	18	11	1	125	107
Boston College	21	9	10	2	.476	85	80	30	15	13	2	140	114
Northeastern	21	9	11	1	.452	87	87	28	13	14	1	129	122
Maine	21	1	20	0	.048	71	140	29	5	24	0	105	168
West Region
St. Lawrence	20	14	6	0	.700	89	78	36	23	12	1	147	131
Clarkson	20	13	6	1	.675	104	67	31	19	11	1	155	104
Rensselaer	20	13	7	0	.650	122	90	29	18	11	0	167	130
Colgate	20	9	9	2	.500	89	81	28	15	10	3	152	114
Vermont	20	3	16	1	.175	60	106	28	6	21	1	89	148
Ivy Region
Harvard*	21	15	5	1	.738	113	67	34	23	9	2	177	105
Yale	21	12	9	0	.571	104	70	28	14	14	0	123	90
Cornell	21	10	8	3	.548	83	79	26	13	10	3	109	100
Princeton	21	7	12	2	.381	85	106	25	9	14	2	102	121
Dartmouth	21	6	14	1	.310	85	119	26	9	15	2	115	141
Brown	21	2	18	1	.119	53	127	25	3	21	1	70	145
Independent
Army^	-	-	-	-	-	-	-	37	25	11	1	218	137
Championship: Harvard † indicates conference regular season champion * indicates conference tournament champion^ Army had been accepted into ECAC Hockey but had not begun a conference schedule

1982–83 NCAA Division I Independent ice hockey standings
	Conference							Overall					
	GP	W	L	T	PTS	GF	GA	GP	W	L	T	GF	GA
Air Force	0	0	0	0	-	-	-	28	5	23	0	100	194
Kent State	0	0	0	0	-	-	-	31	6	25	0		
Northern Arizona	0	0	0	0	-	-	-	29	17	11	1	166	131
US International	0	0	0	0	-	-	-	32	13	17	2		

1982–83 Western Collegiate Hockey Association standings
	Conference							Overall					
	GP	W	L	T	PTS	GF	GA	GP	W	L	T	GF	GA
Minnesota†	26	18	7	1	37	148	101	46	33	12	1	253	155
North Dakota	26	16	9	1	33	115	71	36	21	13	2	158	100
Wisconsin*	26	15	9	2	32	118	85	47	33	10	4	233	131
Minnesota-Duluth	26	14	12	0	28	103	95	45	28	16	1	193	158
Denver	26	11	15	0	22	120	146	37	15	22	0	177	207
Colorado College	26	2	24	0	4	78	184	35	6	28	1	126	227
Championship: Wisconsin † indicates conference regular season champion * indicates conference tournament champion

=== Final regular season polls ===
The final top 10 teams as ranked by coaches (WMPL) before the conference tournament finals.

The final media poll (CHSB/WDOM) was released after the conference tournament finals.

WMPL Coaches Poll
Ranking	Team
1	Minnesota (10)
2	Bowling Green
3	North Dakota
4	Providence
5	Michigan State
6	Ohio State
7	Wisconsin
8	Harvard
9	St. Lawrence
10	Minnesota Duluth

CHSB / WDOM Media Poll
Ranking	Team
1	Wisconsin (4)
2	Minnesota (6)
3	Harvard
4	Bowling Green
5	Michigan State
6	Providence
7	North Dakota
8	Minnesota Duluth
9	New Hampshire
10	Ohio State

== 1983 NCAA Tournament ==
Quarterfinals; March 18–20
E1	Harvard	6	3	9
W4	Michigan State	5	3	8
W2	Minnesota	9	7	16
E3	New Hampshire	6	2	8
W1	Wisconsin	6	7	13
E4	St. Lawrence	2	1	3
E2	Providence	7	3	10
W3	Minnesota–Duluth	3	2	5

Semifinals; March 24–25
E1	Harvard	5
W2	Minnesota	3
W1	Wisconsin	2
E2	Providence	0

National Championship; March 26
E1	Harvard	2
W1	Wisconsin	6
Third Place Game
W2	Minnesota	3
E2	Providence	4

Note: * denotes overtime period(s)

== Player stats ==
=== Scoring leaders ===
The following players led the league in points at the conclusion of the season.

GP = Games played; G = Goals; A = Assists; Pts = Points; PIM = Penalty minutes

Player	Class	Team	GP	G	A	Pts	PIM
Brian Hills	Senior	Bowling Green	40	37	57	94	36
Scott Bjugstad	Senior	Minnesota	44	43	48	91	30
Andy Browne	Junior	Ohio State	40	42	41	83	52
Bryan Erickson	Senior	Minnesota	42	35	47	82	30
Dave Kobryn	Junior	Ohio State	40	21	57	78	30
Kurt Kleinendorst	Senior	Providence	41	33	39	72	30
Gregg Moore	Senior	Minnesota−Duluth	45	33	39	72	24
Paul Houck	Sophomore	Wisconsin	47	38	33	71	36
Paul Pooley	Junior	Ohio State	36	33	36	69	50
Gates Orlando	Junior	Providence	40	30	39	69	32
Patrick Flatley	Sophomore	Wisconsin	43	25	44	69	32

=== Leading goaltenders ===
The following goaltenders led the league in goals against average at the end of the regular season while playing at least 33% of their team's total minutes.

GP = Games played; Min = Minutes played; W = Wins; L = Losses; OT = Overtime/shootout losses; GA = Goals against; SO = Shutouts; SV% = Save percentage; GAA = Goals against average

Player	Class	Team	GP	Min	W	L	OT	GA	SO	SV%	GAA
Chris Terreri	Freshman	Providence	11	528	7	1	0	17	2	.938	1.93
Marc Behrend	Senior	Wisconsin	19	1315	17	1	1	49	2	.920	2.23
Michael Vacanti	Junior	Minnesota	10	506	6	2	0	21	0	.907	2.50
Jon Casey	Junior	North Dakota	17	1020	9	6	2	42	0	.923	2.51
Ron Scott	Freshman	Michigan State	40	2273	29	9	1	100	2	.899	2.64
Grant Blair	Freshman	Harvard	26	1575	19	7	0	72	3	.904	2.74
Terry Kleisinger	Junior	Wisconsin	18	1021	11	6	1	48	3	.894	2.82
Garvin Federenko	Freshman	Alaska−Anchorage	-	-	10	-	-	41	2	.907	2.88
Darren Jensen	Senior	North Dakota	15	905	9	6	0	45	0	.901	3.00
Paul Tortorella	Junior	Yale	22	-	-	-	-	-	-	.876	3.19

== Awards ==
=== NCAA ===
Award		Recipient
Hobey Baker Memorial Award		Mark Fusco, Harvard
Spencer Penrose Award		Bill Cleary, Harvard
Most Outstanding Player in NCAA Tournament		Marc Behrend, Wisconsin
AHCA All-American Teams
East Team	Position	West Team
Darren Eliot, Cornell	G	Ron Scott, Michigan State
Gray Weicker, St. Lawrence	G	
Mark Fusco, Harvard	D	Doug Lidster, Colorado College
Randy Velischek, Providence	D	James Patrick, North Dakota
Bob Brooke, Yale	F	Kirt Bjork, Notre Dame
Kurt Kleinendorst, Providence	F	Patrick Flatley, Wisconsin
Colin Patterson, Clarkson	F	Brian Hills, Bowling Green

=== CCHA ===
Awards		Recipient
Player of the Year		Brian Hills, Bowling Green
Rookie of the Year		Chris Seychel, Michigan
Coach of the Year		Jerry Welsh, Ohio State
Most Valuable Player in Tournament		Mike David, Bowling Green
All-CCHA Teams
First Team	Position	Second Team
Ron Scott, Michigan State	G	John Dougan, Ohio State
Ken Leiter, Michigan State	D	Gary Haight, Michigan State
Garry Galley, Bowling Green	D	Kevin Beaton, Miami
Brian Hills, Bowling Green	F	Kirt Bjork, Notre Dame
Andy Browne, Ohio State	F	Dan Kane, Bowling Green
Ted Speers, Michigan	F	Dave Kobryn, Ohio State

=== ECAC ===
Award		Recipient
Player of the Year		Randy Velischek, Providence
Rookie of the Year		George Servinis, Rensselaer
Most Outstanding Player in Tournament		Mitch Olson, Harvard
All-ECAC Hockey Teams
First Team	Position	Second Team
Darren Eliot, Cornell	G	Cleon Daskalakis, Boston University
	G	Gray Weicker, St. Lawrence
Randy Velischek, Providence	D	Kent Carlson, St. Lawrence
Mark Fusco, Harvard	D	Dave Fretz, Clarkson
Kurt Kleinendorst, Providence	F	Colin Patterson, Clarkson
Scott Fusco, Harvard	F	Paul Guay, Providence
Bob Brooke, Yale	F	Normand Lacombe, New Hampshire

=== WCHA ===
Award		Recipient
Most Valuable Player		Bob Mason, Minnesota-Duluth
Freshman of the Year		Craig Redmond, Denver
Coach of the Year		Mike Sertich, Minnesota-Duluth
All-WCHA Teams
First Team	Position	Second Team
Bob Mason, Minnesota-Duluth	G	Jon Casey, North Dakota
James Patrick, North Dakota	D	Bruce Driver, Wisconsin
Doug Lidster, Colorado College	D	Chris Chelios, Wisconsin
Scott Bjugstad, Minnesota	F	Paul Houck, Wisconsin
Bryan Erickson, Minnesota	F	Dave Tippett, North Dakota
Patrick Flatley, Wisconsin	F	Gregg Moore, Minnesota-Duluth

== 1983 NHL entry draft ==
Round	Pick	Player	College	Conference	NHL team
1	10	Normand Lacombe	New Hampshire	ECAC Hockey	Buffalo Sabres
2	29	Brad Berry ^{†}	North Dakota	WCHA	Winnipeg Jets
2	36	Malcolm Parks ^{†}	North Dakota	WCHA	Minnesota North Stars
2	40	Mike Golden ^{†}	New Hampshire	ECAC Hockey	Edmonton Oilers
3	43	Peter Taglianetti ^{†}	Providence	ECAC Hockey	Winnipeg Jets
3	55	Perry Berezan ^{†}	North Dakota	WCHA	Calgary Flames
3	56	Mitch Messier ^{†}	Michigan State	CCHA	Minnesota North Stars
3	60	Mike Flanagan ^{†}	Providence	ECAC Hockey	Edmonton Oilers
4	63	Frank Pietrangelo	Minnesota	WCHA	Pittsburgh Penguins
4	69	Bob Essensa ^{†}	Michigan State	CCHA	Winnipeg Jets
4	72	Ron Chyzowski ^{†}	Northern Michigan	CCHA	Hartford Whalers
4	74	Daren Puppa ^{†}	Rensselaer	ECAC Hockey	Buffalo Sabres
4	75	Tim Bergland ^{†}	Minnesota	WCHA	Washington Capitals
4	76	Brian Durand ^{†}	Minnesota–Duluth	WCHA	Minnesota North Stars
4	77	Bill Claviter ^{†}	North Dakota	WCHA	Toronto Maple Leafs
4	79	Tarek Howard ^{†}	North Dakota	WCHA	Chicago Black Hawks
4	81	Allen Bourbeau ^{†}	Harvard	ECAC Hockey	Philadelphia Flyers
5	84	Bob Caulfield ^{†}	Miami	CCHA	New York Islanders
5	85	Chris Terreri ^{†}	Providence	ECAC Hockey	New Jersey Devils
5	96	Rich Geist ^{†}	Minnesota	WCHA	Minnesota North Stars
5	98	Dan Wurst ^{†}	Providence	ECAC Hockey	Montreal Canadiens
5	100	Garry Galley	Bowling Green	CCHA	Los Angeles Kings
6	104	Brian Johnson ^{†}	Minnesota–Duluth	WCHA	Hartford Whalers
6	108	Kevin Stevens ^{†}	Boston College	ECAC Hockey	Los Angeles Kings
6	111	Grant Blair	Harvard	ECAC Hockey	Calgary Flames
6	113	Bob Alexander ^{†}	Minnesota	WCHA	New York Rangers
6	116	Tom McComb ^{†}	Lowell	ECAC Hockey	Minnesota North Stars
6	117	Darin Illikainen ^{†}	Minnesota–Duluth	WCHA	New York Islanders
6	120	Don Barber ^{†}	Bowling Green	CCHA	Edmonton Oilers
6	122	Terry Taillefer ^{†}	Boston University	ECAC Hockey	Boston Bruins
7	129	Iain Duncan ^{†}	Bowling Green	CCHA	Winnipeg Jets
7	132	Craig Mack ^{†}	Minnesota	WCHA	Quebec Nordiques
7	133	Steve Orth ^{†}	Minnesota	WCHA	New York Rangers
7	136	Sean Toomey ^{†}	Minnesota–Duluth	WCHA	Minnesota North Stars
7	137	Jim Sprenger ^{†}	Minnesota–Duluth	WCHA	New York Islanders
8	144	Jamie Falle	Clarkson	ECAC Hockey	Hartford Whalers
8	147	Ken Hammond	Rensselaer	ECAC Hockey	Los Angeles Kings
8	149	Ron Pesetti	Western Michigan	CCHA	Winnipeg Jets
8	150	John Labatt ^{†}	Minnesota	WCHA	Vancouver Canucks
8	151	Chris MacDonald	Western Michigan	CCHA	Calgary Flames
8	153	Pete Marcov ^{†}	Cornell	ECAC Hockey	New York Rangers
8	154	Donald McSween ^{†}	Michigan State	CCHA	Buffalo Sabres
8	158	Rob Bryden ^{†}	Western Michigan	CCHA	Montreal Canadiens
8	160	Ralph Vos ^{†}	Northern Michigan	CCHA	Edmonton Oilers
9	163	Marty Ketola ^{†}	Colorado College	WCHA	Pittsburgh Penguins
9	165	Jay Octeau ^{†}	Boston University	ECAC Hockey	New Jersey Devils
9	167	Bruce Fishback	Minnesota–Duluth	WCHA	Los Angeles Kings
9	168	Cliff Abrecht	Princeton	ECAC Hockey	Toronto Maple Leafs
9	169	Todd Flichel ^{†}	Bowling Green	CCHA	Winnipeg Jets
9	173	Paul Jerrard ^{†}	Lake Superior State	CCHA	New York Rangers
9	175	Dave Cowan ^{†}	Minnesota–Duluth	WCHA	Washington Capitals
9	180	Dave Roach ^{†}	Michigan Tech	CCHA	Edmonton Oilers
10	189	Kory Wright ^{†}	Northern Michigan	CCHA	Winnipeg Jets
10	190	Roger Grillo	Maine	ECAC Hockey	Vancouver Canucks
10	191	Tom Pratt ^{†}	St. Lawrence	ECAC Hockey	Calgary Flames
10	192	Scott Shaunessy ^{†}	Boston University	ECAC Hockey	Quebec Nordiques
10	201	Bill MacCormick ^{†}	Vermont	ECAC Hockey	Philadelphia Flyers
10	202	Paul Fitzsimmons	Northeastern	ECAC Hockey	Boston Bruins
11	210	Steve Kayser	Vermont	ECAC Hockey	Vancouver Canucks
11	217	John Bjorkman ^{†}	Michigan	CCHA	New York Islanders
11	218	Jeff Perpich ^{†}	Denver	WCHA	Montreal Canadiens
11	221	Brian Jopling ^{†}	Rensselaer	ECAC Hockey	Philadelphia Flyers
11	222	Norm Foster ^{†}	Michigan State	CCHA	Boston Bruins
12	226	Chuck Chiatto ^{†}	Western Michigan	CCHA	Detroit Red Wings
12	230	Jay Mazur ^{†}	Maine	ECAC Hockey	Vancouver Canucks
12	235	Kermit Salfi ^{†}	Ferris State	CCHA	Buffalo Sabres
12	236	Paul Roff ^{†}	Ohio State	CCHA	Minnesota North Stars
12	237	Pete McGeough ^{†}	St. Lawrence	ECAC Hockey	New York Islanders
12	241	Harold Duvall ^{†}	Colgate	ECAC Hockey	Philadelphia Flyers
12	242	Greg Murphy ^{†}	Brown	ECAC Hockey	Boston Bruins

† incoming freshman

== See also ==
- 1982–83 NCAA Division II men's ice hockey season
- 1982–83 NCAA Division III men's ice hockey season
