= 1981–82 North Dakota Fighting Sioux men's ice hockey season =

National champion WCHA, champion 1982 NCAA tournament, champion
- Conference: 1st WCHA
- Home ice: Winter Sports Center

Record
- Overall: 35–12–0
- Conference: 19–7–0
- Home: 21–5–0
- Road: 12–6–0
- Neutral: 2–1–0

Coaches and captains
- Head coach: John Gasparini
- Assistant coaches: Dean Blais; Don Boyd
- Captain(s): Phil Sykes; Cary Eades

The 1981–82 North Dakota Fighting Sioux men's ice hockey team represented the University of North Dakota in college ice hockey. In its fourth year under head coach John Gasparini, the team compiled a 35–12–0 record and reached the NCAA tournament for the ninth time. The Fighting Sioux defeated Wisconsin 5–2 to win the championship game at the Providence Civic Center in Providence, Rhode Island.

== Season ==
=== Early season ===
In the summer of 1981 the WCHA suffered a tremendous upheaval. Two years after a proposal to divide the Conference into two divisions was rejected, the three Michigan schools along with Notre Dame left for the CCHA, a lesser but more geographically-centered conference. As a result, the WCHA was left with only 6 teams though those teams had combined to win 5 of the previous 6 national championships. The six teams scrambled to fill up their conference schedules against one another which resulted in several cases of unbalanced home/road games between WCHA members.

Regardless of their conference issues, North Dakota began the season on the road against Bowling Green, taking both games against the eventual CCHA champion. The following week UND hosted Northern Arizona, who were only in their second year of Division I play, and easily won both games with a combined score of 18–4. The Fighting Sioux ended their non-conference start with a pair of games against Providence and could only manage to split the weekend after a promising 6–0 win.

The Sioux's first loss of the year began an alternating cycle of wins and losses that lasted for over a month and plagues them through their early WCHA play. Even when the team headed to San Diego for a brief respite from the winter cold they couldn't shake the pattern and UND returned home with a 10–6 record but only 4–4 in conference. In mid-December North Dakota finally climbed out of their funk and won four consecutive games to close out the first part of their regular season.

=== Holiday Tournament ===
North Dakota headed to Troy to participate in the Rensselaer Holiday Tournament but with the team losing several members to the World Junior championship the Fighting Sioux couldn't stop St. Lawrence from posting 7 goals in the contest. UND salvaged the tournament with a win in the consolation game before barely squeaking by a down Boston University squad.

After returning home North Dakota returned to their conference schedule and won two tight games against Denver before splitting a road series at Colorado College. After capturing another home series UND headed to Wisconsin to take on the defending national champions as well as their biggest competition for the WCHA regular season title. At this point in the season Wisconsin was comfortably in the lead with a 14–1–1 conference record but UND had the ability to close the 7-point gap. The Fighting Sioux shut out Wisconsin in the first game but the Badgers came storming back to turn the tables on North Dakota and the two teams drew even after the weekend.

With UND needing a minor miracle to catch up to Wisconsin they played the two worst teams in the WCHA over a two-week span and won all four games. Fortunately, UND got the help they needed when Wisconsin split consecutive weekends (at home no less) and arrived in North Dakota with only a 3-point lead in the standings. The Fighting Sioux took full advantage and swept the weekend to put themselves atop the WCHA for the first time all season. With only one weekend remaining in the regular UND only needed to hold serve with Wisconsin but luck stayed on their side when the Badgers lost an 8–9 contest to Minnesota–Duluth. North Dakota won their first game against Denver and won the WCHA title, earning the first Broadmoor Trophy which replaced the MacNaughton Cup that Michigan Tech kept when they left the conference.

=== WCHA tournament ===
With only six teams left in the conference the WCHA decided to include all members in the postseason tournament with the top two seeds receiving byes to the semifinal. As conference champion, North Dakota sat idle for a weekend before welcoming Denver to Grand Forks. After a close win in game 1 UND captured the series with a 3-goal win to put them in the first WCHA championship series in 5 years. The only team standing in their way was Wisconsin who were looking for revenge after being passed for the conference title. In the first game North Dakota suffered their worst lost in six years, losing 0–9 at home. Because the championship was a two-game total-goal series UND still had another contest against Wisconsin but with a virtually insurmountable deficit UND was flat in the second match and lost to the Badgers once more.

=== NCAA tournament ===
Despite being embarrassed in the championship, North Dakota's season was not over and the 31 wins the team posted over the course of the season all but guaranteed UND with an at-large bit to the NCAA tournament. UND received the 2nd western seed and was able to host the Quarterfinal series against Clarkson. The Fighting Sioux defense showed up in full, holding the Golden Knights to a single goal in each game and advanced to the championship round in Providence.

In the semifinal North Dakota faced Northeastern who were making their first tournament appearance. After easily dispatching the Huskies, North Dakota faced Wisconsin for the seventh and final time. The two teams were evenly matched in the first period; Glen White opened the score less than 90 seconds in but the badgers responded less than three minutes later. The UND defense began to clamp down on UW in the second but that couldn't stop Wisconsin from again tying the game quickly. In the final period the Fighting Sioux threw caution to the wind and fired a barrage of 16 shots against Terry Kleisinger, finding the twine three times while Darren Jensen held the UND net. Team captain Phil Sykes was the story of the game, producing a hat trick along with an assist for North Dakota and allowing his team to win the national championship for the fourth time.

=== Awards and honors ===
Phil Sykes set an NCAA record for total points in championship games with 9 when his totals from the 1980 game are included (still the top mark as of 2019). Sykes received the tournament MOP for his performance and was joined on the All-Tournament team by Darren Jensen, James Patrick and Cary Eades. Despite North Dakota setting a new program record with 35 wins (since broken) no players were named to the AHCA All-American West Team, however, the WCHA recognized the team's accomplishments and UND swept the individual conference awards with Sykes winning Most Valuable Player, James Patrick capturing Freshman of the Year and John Gasparini receiving Coach of the Year. Furthermore, despite North Dakota rotating three goaltenders nearly equally throughout the season, Jon Casey was named to the All-WCHA First Team with Phil Sykes while James Patrick, Craig Ludwig and Troy Murray were named to the Second Team. Jon Casey also set a new team record for wins in a season with 15 (since UND began keeping individual goaltending records in 1973).

== Standings ==
1981–82 Western Collegiate Hockey Association standings
	Conference							Overall					
	GP	W	L	T	PTS	GF	GA	GP	W	L	T	GF	GA
North Dakota†	26	19	7	0	38	119	81	47	35	12	0	218	143
Wisconsin*	26	18	7	1	37	126	80	47	35	11	1	255	126
Minnesota	26	13	11	2	28	103	102	36	22	12	2	153	125
Denver	26	9	15	2	20	119	132	43	21	19	3	233	197
Minnesota-Duluth	26	9	16	1	19	114	141	40	16	21	3	192	201
Colorado College	26	6	18	2	14	105	150	36	11	23	2	152	196
Championship: Wisconsin † indicates conference regular season champion * indicates conference tournament champion

== Schedule ==
Date	Opponent^{#}	Rank^{#}	Site	Result	Record
Regular season
October 16	at Bowling Green*		BGSU Ice Arena • Bowling Green, Ohio	W 6–4	1–0
October 17	at Bowling Green*		BGSU Ice Arena • Bowling Green, Ohio	W 6–3	2–0
October 23	vs. Northern Arizona*		Winter Sports Center • Grand Forks, North Dakota	W 10–2	3–0
October 24	vs. Northern Arizona*		Winter Sports Center • Grand Forks, North Dakota	W 8–2	4–0
October 30	vs. Providence*		Winter Sports Center • Grand Forks, North Dakota	W 6–0	5–0
October 31	vs. Providence*		Winter Sports Center • Grand Forks, North Dakota	L 5–6 ^{OT}	5–1
November 6	vs. Minnesota–Duluth		Winter Sports Center • Grand Forks, North Dakota	W 4–1	6–1 (1–0)
November 7	vs. Minnesota–Duluth		Winter Sports Center • Grand Forks, North Dakota	L 4–5	6–2 (1–1)
November 13	at Colorado College		Broadmoor World Arena • Colorado Springs, Colorado	W 5–4	7–2 (2–1)
November 14	at Colorado College		Broadmoor World Arena • Colorado Springs, Colorado	L 2–3	7–3 (2–2)
November 20	at Minnesota		Williams Arena • Minneapolis, Minnesota	W 5–2	8–3 (3–2)
November 21	at Minnesota		Williams Arena • Minneapolis, Minnesota	L 5–7	8–4 (3–3)
November 27	vs. Denver		Winter Sports Center • Grand Forks, North Dakota	W 7–1	9–4 (4–3)
November 28	vs. Denver		Winter Sports Center • Grand Forks, North Dakota	L 5–2	9–5 (4–4)
December 5	at US International*		San Diego Ice Arena • San Diego, California	W 5–2	10–5 (4–4)
December 6	at US International*		San Diego Ice Arena • San Diego, California	L 1–3	10–6 (4–4)
December 11	vs. Minnesota–Duluth		Winter Sports Center • Grand Forks, North Dakota	W 4–1	11–6 (5–4)
December 12	vs. Minnesota–Duluth		Winter Sports Center • Grand Forks, North Dakota	W 7–4	12–6 (6–4)
December 18	vs. Ferris State*		Winter Sports Center • Grand Forks, North Dakota	W 5–2	13–6 (6–4)
December 19	vs. Ferris State*		Winter Sports Center • Grand Forks, North Dakota	W 6–2	14–6 (6–4)
Rensselaer Holiday Tournament
December 29	vs. St. Lawrence*		Houston Field House • Troy, New York (Tournament Semifinal)	L 5–7	14–7 (6–4)
December 30	at Rensselaer*		Houston Field House • Troy, New York (Tournament Consolation Game)	W 5–4	15–7 (6–4)
January 2	at Boston University*		Walter Brown Arena • Boston, Massachusetts	W 3–2 ^{OT}	16–7 (6–4)
January 8	vs. Denver		Winter Sports Center • Grand Forks, North Dakota	W 6–4	17–7 (7–4)
January 9	vs. Denver		Winter Sports Center • Grand Forks, North Dakota	W 5–4	18–7 (8–4)
January 15	at Colorado College		Broadmoor World Arena • Colorado Springs, Colorado	L 2–6	18–8 (8–5)
January 16	at Colorado College		Broadmoor World Arena • Colorado Springs, Colorado	W 6–3	19–8 (9–5)
January 22	vs. Minnesota		Winter Sports Center • Grand Forks, North Dakota	W 3–1	20–8 (10–5)
January 23	vs. Minnesota		Winter Sports Center • Grand Forks, North Dakota	W 4–1	21–8 (11–5)
January 29	at Wisconsin		Dane County Coliseum • Madison, Wisconsin	W 3–0	22–8 (12–5)
January 30	at Wisconsin		Dane County Coliseum • Madison, Wisconsin	L 0–3	22–9 (12–6)
February 5	vs. Colorado College		Winter Sports Center • Grand Forks, North Dakota	W 6–1	23–9 (13–6)
February 6	vs. Colorado College		Winter Sports Center • Grand Forks, North Dakota	W 5–2	24–9 (14–6)
February 12	at Minnesota–Duluth		Duluth Arena Auditorium • Duluth, Minnesota	W 4–3 ^{OT}	25–9 (15–6)
February 13	at Minnesota–Duluth		Duluth Arena Auditorium • Duluth, Minnesota	W 11–3	26–9 (16–6)
February 19	vs. Wisconsin		Winter Sports Center • Grand Forks, North Dakota	W 5–4 ^{OT}	27–9 (17–6)
February 20	vs. Wisconsin		Winter Sports Center • Grand Forks, North Dakota	W 3–1	28–9 (18–6)
February 26	at Denver		DU Arena • Denver, Colorado	W 8–4	29–9 (19–6)
February 27	at Denver		DU Arena • Denver, Colorado	L 3–4	29–10 (19–7)
WCHA tournament
March 9	vs. Denver*		Winter Sports Center • Grand Forks, North Dakota (WCHA Semifinal game 1)	W 4–3	30–10 (19–7)
March 10	vs. Denver*		Winter Sports Center • Grand Forks, North Dakota (WCHA Semifinal game 2)	W 5–2	31–10 (19–7)
North Dakota Wins Series 9–5
March 13	vs. Wisconsin*		Winter Sports Center • Grand Forks, North Dakota (WCHA championship game 1)	L 0–9	31–11 (19–7)
March 14	vs. Wisconsin*		Winter Sports Center • Grand Forks, North Dakota (WCHA championship game 2)	L 1–3	31–12 (19–7)
North Dakota Loses Series 1–12
NCAA tournament
March 19	vs. Clarkson*		Winter Sports Center • Grand Forks, North Dakota (National Quarterfinal game 1)	W 5–1	32–12 (19–7)
March 20	vs. Clarkson*		Winter Sports Center • Grand Forks, North Dakota (National Quarterfinal game 2)	W 2–1	33–12 (19–7)
North Dakota Wins Series 7–2
March 25	vs. Northeastern*		Providence Civic Center • Providence, Rhode Island (National Semifinal)	W 6–2	34–12 (19–7)
March 27	vs. Wisconsin*		Providence Civic Center • Providence, Rhode Island (National championship)	W 5–2	35–12 (19–7)
*Non-conference game. ^{#}Rankings from USCHO.com Poll. Source:

== Roster and scoring statistics ==
No.	Name	Year	Position	Hometown	S/P/C	Games	Goals	Assists	Pts	PIM
25	Phil Sykes	Senior	LW	Dawson Creek, BC	(British Columbia)	45	39	24	63	20
7	Troy Murray	Sophomore	C	Calgary, AB	(Alberta)	42	22	29	51	62
22	Cary Eades	Senior	W	Burnaby, BC	(British Columbia)	41	21	23	44	52
11	Gord Sherven	Freshman	C	Weyburn, SK	(Saskatchewan)	46	18	25	43	16
8	Dave Tippett	Freshman	LW	Moosomin, SK	(Saskatchewan)	43	13	28	41	24
9	Dusty Carroll	Junior	C	Charlottetown, PE	(Prince Edward Island)	46	19	12	31	24
2	Craig Ludwig	Junior	D	Eagle River, WI	(Wisconsin)	47	5	26	31	70
3	James Patrick	Freshman	D	Winnipeg, MB	(Manitoba)	42	4	25	29	26
20	Dan Brennan	Sophomore	F	Dawson Creek, BC	(British Columbia)	42	10	17	27	57
21	Jim Archibald	Freshman	RW	Craik, SK	(Saskatchewan)	41	10	16	26	96
16	Dave Donnelly	Freshman	C	Edmonton, AB	(Alberta)	38	10	15	25	38
5	Mike Stone	Senior	D	Roseau, MN	(Minnesota)	46	4	20	24	68
10	Glen White	Junior	C	Rosetown, SK	(Saskatchewan)	35	10	12	22	14
26	Steve Palmiscno	Sophomore	D	Grand Forks, ND	(North Dakota)	29	9	10	19	4
18	Dean Dachyshyn	Junior	LW	Devon, AB	(Alberta)	30	6	13	19	82
6	Rick Zombo	Freshman	D	Des Plaines, IL	(Illinois)	45	1	15	16	31
4	Bill Whitsitt	Sophomore	D	Bloomington, MN	(Minnesota)	46	3	11	14	10
17	Dean Barsness	Sophomore	C	Grand Forks, ND	(North Dakota)	18	4	9	13	0
14	Frank Burggraf	Senior	C	Roseau, MN	(Minnesota)	24	3	9	12	16
19	Glen Fester	Sophomore	D	Vernon, BC	(British Columbia)	34	1	7	8	20
15	Troy Magnuson	Junior	W	Chanhassen, MN	(Minnesota)	22	3	4	7	0
13	Ed Christian	Sophomore	F	Warroad, MN	(Minnesota)	23	1	2	3	14
30	Darren Jensen	Junior	G	Creston, BC	(British Columbia)	16	0	0	0	2
34	Pierre Lamoureux	Junior	G	Fort Saskatchewan, AB	(Alberta)	16	0	0	0	9
1	Jon Casey	Sophomore	G	Grand Rapids, MN	(Minnesota)	18	0	0	0	0
Total										

== Goaltending statistics ==
No.	Name	Games	Minutes	Wins	Losses	Ties	Goals against	Saves	Shut outs	SV %	GAA
1	Jon Casey	18	1038	15	3	0	48	473	1	.908	2.77
30	Darren Jensen	16	–	–	–	–	–	–	1	.892	2.96
34	Pierre Lamoureux	16	–	–	–	–	–	–	0	.896	3.24
Total		47	–	35	12	0	143	–	2	.897	3.04

== 1982 championship game ==
=== (W1) Wisconsin vs. (W2) North Dakota ===
March 27	Wisconsin	2–5	North Dakota	Providence Civic Center

Scoring summary
Period	Team	Goal	Assist(s)	Time	Score
1st	UND	Glen White – PP	Sykes and Fester	1:26	1–0 UND
1st	WIS	Ron Vincent	Thomas	3:56	1–1
2nd	UND	Phil Sykes	Sherven	21:09	2–1 UND
2nd	WIS	John Newberry	Pearson and Flatley	25:30	2–2
3rd	UND	Phil Sykes – GW	Ludwig and White	46:27	3–2 UND
3rd	UND	Cary Eades	Murray and Dachyshyn	50:07	4–2 UND
3rd	UND	Phil Sykes	White and Zombo	55:08	5–2 UND

Shots by period
Team	1	2	3	T
North Dakota	12	10	16	38
Wisconsin	11	5	9	25

Goaltenders
Team	Name	Saves	Goals against	Time on ice
UND	Darren Jensen	23	2	60:00
WIS	Terry Kleisinger	33	5	60:00

== Players drafted into the NHL ==
=== 1982 NHL entry draft ===
= NHL All-Star team	= NHL All-Star	= NHL All-Star and NHL All-Star team	= Did not play in the NHL

Round	Pick	Player	NHL team
2	40	Scott Sandelin†	Montreal Canadiens
4	78	Chris Jensen†	New York Rangers
5	96	Tim Mishler†	Winnipeg Jets
7	133	Jay Ness†	Chicago Black Hawks
8	151	Mickey Krampotich†	Hartford Whalers
9	187	Brian Williams†	Montreal Canadiens
11	213	Tim Loven†	Toronto Maple Leafs

† incoming freshman

== See also ==
- 1982 NCAA Division I Men's Ice Hockey Tournament
- List of NCAA Division I Men's Ice Hockey Tournament champions
