= 1982 NCAA Division I men's ice hockey tournament =

- Teams: 8
- Finals site: Providence Civic Center, Providence, Rhode Island
- Champions: North Dakota Fighting Sioux (4th title)
- Runner-up: Wisconsin Badgers (4th title game)
- Semifinalists: Northeastern Huskies (1st Frozen Four); New Hampshire Wildcats (3rd Frozen Four)
- Winning coach: Gino Gasparini (2nd title)
- MOP: Phil Sykes (North Dakota)

The 1982 NCAA Division I men's ice hockey tournament was the culmination of the 1981–82 NCAA Division I men's ice hockey season, the 35th such tournament in NCAA history. It was held between March 19 and 27, 1982, and concluded with North Dakota defeating Wisconsin 5-2. All Quarterfinals matchups were held at home team venues while all succeeding games were played at the Providence Civic Center in Providence, Rhode Island.

== Qualifying teams ==
The NCAA permitted 8 teams to qualify for the tournament and divided its qualifiers into two regions (East and West). Each of the tournament champions from the three Division I conferences (CCHA, ECAC and WCHA) received automatic invitations into the tournament. Two additional automatic bids were received by the two ECAC division champions that did not contain the ECAC champion. At-large bids made up the remaining 3 teams, an additional 1 eastern and 2 western schools.

East							West						
Seed	School	Conference	Record	Berth type	Appearance	Last bid	Seed	School	Conference	Record	Berth type	Appearance	Last bid
1	Northeastern	ECAC Hockey	23–8–1	Tournament champion	1st	Never	1	Wisconsin	WCHA	32–10–1	Tournament champion	7th	1981
2	New Hampshire	ECAC Hockey	20–12–0	At-large bid	3rd	1979	2	North Dakota	WCHA	31–12–0	At-large bid	9th	1980
3	Clarkson	ECAC Hockey	26–6–1	Division champion	8th	1981	3	Michigan State	CCHA	26–12–2	Tournament champion	4th	1967
4	Harvard	ECAC Hockey	13–13–2	Division champion	8th	1975	4	Bowling Green	CCHA	27–12–1	At-large bid	4th	1979

== Format ==
The tournament featured three rounds of play. The two odd-number ranked teams from one region were placed into a bracket with the two even-number ranked teams of the other region. The teams were then seeded according to their ranking. In the Quarterfinals the first and fourth seeds and the second and third seeds played two-game aggregate series to determine which school advanced to the Semifinals. Beginning with the Semifinals all games were played at the Providence Civic Center and all series became Single-game eliminations. The winning teams in the semifinals advanced to the National Championship Game with the losers playing in a Third Place game.

== Tournament bracket ==
Quarterfinals; March 19–21
E1	Northeastern	2	3*	5
W4	Bowling Green	2	2	4
W2	North Dakota	5	2	7
E3	Clarkson	1	1	2
W1	Wisconsin	6	4	10
E4	Harvard	1	3	4
E2	New Hampshire	3	6	9
W3	Michigan State	2	2	4

Semifinals; March 25–26
E1	Northeastern	2
W2	North Dakota	6
W1	Wisconsin	5
E2	New Hampshire	0

National championship March 27
W2	North Dakota	5
W1	Wisconsin	2
Third-place game
E1	Northeastern	10
E2	New Hampshire	4

Note: * denotes overtime period(s)

=== Quarterfinals ===
==== (E1) Northeastern vs. (W4) Bowling Green ====
March 19	Northeastern	2 – 2	Bowling Green	Matthews Arena
(O'Brien, Pasinato) Alan Barth - 07:18		First period	14:41 - Brian MacLellan (Kane); 18:04 - Perry Braun (Kane, O'Brien)
No scoring		Second period	No scoring
(Marshall, Mancurek) Brad Cowie - PP - 09:20		Third period	No scoring
( 33 saves / 35 shots ) Mark Davidner		Goalie stats	Mike David ( 41 saves / 43 shots )

March 20	Northeastern	3 – 2	OT	Bowling Green	Matthews Arena	Recap
No scoring		First period		19:55 - Dave O'Brian (Kane)
(Marshall, Cowie) Craig Frank - PP - 16:42		Second period		04:09 - Dan Kane (Galley, O'Brian)
(McDougall) Gerry Cowie - PP - 09:08		Third period		No scoring
(Bucyk, Madigan) Bob Averill - GW - 00:24		First overtime period		No scoring
( 26 saves / 28 shots ) Mark Davidner		Goalie stats		Mike David ( 37 saves / 40 shots )

Northeastern won series 5–4

==== (E2) New Hampshire vs. (W3) Michigan State ====
March 19	New Hampshire	3 – 2	Michigan State	Snively Arena
No scoring		First period	No scoring
(Barton, Potter) Brian Byrnes – 14:47		Second period	No scoring
(unassisted) Dan Potter – 07:39 (Doherty, White) Ralph Robinson – GW – 16:20		Third period	06:40 – Mark Hamway (Haight); 12:40 – Mark Hamway (Phair, Flegel)
(34 saves / 36 shots) Todd Pearson		Goalie stats	Ron Scott (35 saves / 38 shots)

March 20	New Hampshire	6 – 2	Michigan State	Snively Arena
(Brickley) Paul Barton - PP – 17:03		First period	18:58 - PP – Lyke Phair (Miller, Martin)
(Ellison, Chisholm) Dan Muse – 08:05 (R. Robinson, Doherty) George White - GW – 10:03 (Forget, R. Robinson) Ross Yantzi - PP – 15:12		Second period	No scoring
(Forget, Lee) Normand Lacombe - PP – 07:14 (Muse, Ellison) Dan Muse – 12:10		Third period	17:49 – Newell Brown (Taylor, Phair)
(18 saves / 20 shots) Todd Pearson		Goalie stats	Ron Scott (20 saves / 26 shots)

New Hampshire won series 9–4

==== (W1) Wisconsin vs. (E4) Harvard ====
March 20	Wisconsin	6 – 1	Harvard	Dane County Coliseum	Recap
(Vincent, Chelios) Brian Mullen - 02:37 (Houck, Keryluk) Tim Thomas - GW - 08:47		First period	No scoring
(Houck, Andringa) Scott Sabo - 13:28 (Thomas, Vincent) Todd Lecy - 18:30		Second period	12:52 - Greg Chalmers (Sheehy)
(Thomas, Vincent) Todd Lecy - 14:03 (Newberry, Chelios) Pete Johnson - 19:56		Third period	No scoring
(21 saves / 22 shots) Terry Kleisinger		Goalie stats	Wade Lau (30 saves / 36 shots)

March 21	Wisconsin	4 – 3	Harvard	Dane County Coliseum	Recap
(Johannson, Mullen) Steve McKenzie - 14:08 (Pearson, Newberry) Pat Flatley - PP - 17:20		First period	08:15 - Brian Busconi (Kukulowicz); 19:16 - PP - Greg Olson (M. Fusco, S. Fusco)
(Sabo, Repins) Ken Keryluk - 17:09		Second period	13:31 - PP - Greg Chalmers (Litchfield, Visone)
(Vincent, Chelios) Pete Johnson - PP GW - 19:59		Third period	No scoring
(17 saves / 20 shots) Marc Behrend		Goalie stats	Wade Lau (29 saves / 33 shots)

Wisconsin won series 10–4

==== (W2) North Dakota vs. (E3) Clarkson ====
March 19	North Dakota	5 – 1	Clarkson	Winter Sports Center	Recap
(Carroll, Ludwig) Phil Sykes - 18:56		First period	00:44 - Pat Haramis (unassisted)
(White, Murray) Phil Sykes - PP GW - 06:37		Second period	No scoring
(Archibald, Patrick) Dusty Carroll - 03:31 (Archibald, Carroll) Dan Brennan - 07:46 (Patrick) Jim Archibald - PP - 15:22		Third period	No scoring
(22 saves / 23 shots) Darren Jensen		Goalie stats	Don Sylvestri (14 saves / 19 shots)

March 20	North Dakota	2 – 1	Clarkson	Winter Sports Center	Recap
No scoring		First period	No scoring
(unassisted) James Patrick - 15:47		Second period	No scoring
(White, Eades) Craig Ludwig - PP GW - 05:42		Third period	11:51 - PP - Pat Haramis (McDonough, Cruickshank)
(19 saves / 20 shots) Darren Jensen		Goalie stats	Pete Mielzynski (24 saves / 26 shots)

North Dakota won series 7–2

=== Semifinal ===
==== (E1) Northeastern vs. (W2) North Dakota ====
March 25	Northeastern	2 – 6	North Dakota	Providence Civic Center	Recap
No scoring		First period	08:24 - SH - Dusty Carroll (White); 14:16 - Phil Sykes (Patrick)
No scoring		Second period	03:14 - GW - Jim Archibald (Carroll, Brennan); 04:16 - PP - Cary Eades (Stone, Sykes)
(B. Cowie, McDougall) Gerry Cowie - 11:16 (Manchurek, Averill) Glen Giovanucci - 14:08		Third period	04:25 - PP - Troy Murray (Eades); 10:14 - Dusty Carroll (Brennan, Archibald)
(22 saves / 26 shots) Mark Davidner (4 saves / 6 shots) Tim Marshall		Goalie stats	Darren Jensen (24 saves / 26 shots)

==== (W1) Wisconsin vs. (E2) New Hampshire ====
March 26	Wisconsin	5 – 0	New Hampshire	Providence Civic Center	Recap
(Driver, Flatley) John Newberry - PP GW - 11:24		First period	No scoring
(Newberry, Andringa) Pat Flatley - 12:00 (Chelios, Johannson) Brian Mullen - 19:43		Second period	No scoring
(Mullen, Chelios) John Johannson - PP - 02:57 (Keryluk, Houck) Scott Sabo - 13:16		Third period	No scoring
(29 saves / 29 shots) Terry Kleisinger		Goalie stats	Todd Pearson (29 saves / 34 shots)

=== Third-place game ===
==== (E1) Northeastern vs. (E2) New Hampshire ====
March 27	Northeastern	10 – 4	New Hampshire	Providence Civic Center	Recap
(Frank) Paul McDougall - 04:37 (Handler, Madigan) Randy Bucyk - 15:37		First period	No scoring
(Wieczorek, Madigan) Mitch Handler - 02:58 (Iskyan, Hiltz) Chuck Marshall - 03:40 (Giovanucci, Manchurek) Scot McKenney - GW - 11:59 (Frank, Giovanucci) Scot McKenney - 14:40 (Filipe) Chuck Marshall - 18:03		Second period	17:16 - Ken Chisholm (Pryor, Olson)
(unassisted) Scot McKenney - 02:51 (McKenney, Giovanucci) Ken Manchurek - 07:02 (McDougall) Jeff Hiltz - 18:03		Third period	06:13 - PP - Andy Brickley (Turnbull, Forget); 06:42 - Dan Potter (Lee, Lyons); 15:43 - Dan Potter (Byrnes, Lyons)
(29 saves / 33 shots) Tim Marshall		Goalie stats	Todd Pearson (32 saves / 42 shots)

=== National Championship ===
==== (W1) Wisconsin vs. (W2) North Dakota ====
March 27	Wisconsin	2 – 5	North Dakota	Providence Civic Center

Scoring summary
Period	Team	Goal	Assist(s)	Time	Score
1st	UND	Glen White	Sykes and Fester	1:26	1–0 UND
1st	WIS	Ron Vincent	Thomas	3:56	1–1
2nd	UND	Phil Sykes	Sherven	21:09	2–1 UND
2nd	WIS	John Newberry	Pearson and Flatley	25:30	2–2
3rd	UND	Phil Sykes – GW	Ludwig and White	46:27	3–2 UND
3rd	UND	Cary Eades	Murray and Dachyshyn	50:07	4–2 UND
3rd	UND	Phil Sykes	White and Zombo	55:08	5–2 UND
Penalty summary
Period	Team	Player	Penalty	Time	PIM
1st	WIS	Ron Vincent	High-sticking	4:27	2:00
1st	UND	Jim Archibald	Roughing	7:58	2:00
1st	UND	Troy Murray	High-sticking	9:02	2:00
2nd	WIS	Chris Chelios	High-sticking	26:04	2:00
2nd	UND	James Patrick	Tripping	28:33	2:00
2nd	WIS	Pat Ethier	Slashing	36:36	2:00
2nd	WIS	Terry Kleisinger	Slashing (served by John Johannson)	37:05	2:00
2nd	UND	Phil Sykes	Slashing	37:05	2:00
3rd	WIS	Mark Baron	Hooking	43:30	2:00

Shots by period
Team	1	2	3	T
North Dakota	12	10	16	38
Wisconsin	11	5	9	25

Goaltenders
Team	Name	Saves	Goals against	Time on ice
UND	Darren Jensen	23	2	60:00
WIS	Terry Kleisinger	33	5	60:00

== All-Tournament team ==
- G: Darren Jensen (North Dakota)
- D: Bruce Driver (Wisconsin)
- D: James Patrick (North Dakota)
- F: Cary Eades (North Dakota)
- F: John Newberry (Wisconsin)
- F: Phil Sykes* (North Dakota)

* Most Outstanding Player(s)
