= List of New Hampshire Wildcats men's ice hockey seasons =

This is a season-by-season list of records compiled by New Hampshire in men's ice hockey.

The University of New Hampshire has reached two NCAA Championship games in its history, the most recent coming in 2003.

== Season-by-season results ==
Note: GP = Games played, W = Wins, L = Losses, T = Ties

NCAA D-I Champions	NCAA Frozen Four	Conference regular season champions	Conference Division Champions	Conference Playoff Champions

Season	Conference	Regular season (Note: Code explanation; GP—Games Played, W—Wins, L—Losses, T—Tied games, OTW—Overtime Wins, OTL—Overtime Loses, 3/SW—Win in 3 on 3 overtime or shootout, Pts—Points*)														Conference Tournament Results	National Tournament Results
Season	Conference	Conference									Overall					Conference Tournament Results	National Tournament Results
Season	Conference	GP	W	L	T	OTW	OTL	3/SW	Pts*	Finish	GP	W	L	T	%	Conference Tournament Results	National Tournament Results
Hank Swasey (1924–1925)
1924–25	Independent	–	–	–	–	–	–	–	–	–	4	2	2	0	.500		
Ernest Christensen (1925–1936)
1925–26	Independent	–	–	–	–	–	–	–	–	–	4	1	3	0	.250		
1926–27	Independent	–	–	–	–	–	–	–	–	–	6	6	0	0	1.000		
1927–28	Independent	–	–	–	–	–	–	–	–	–	9	7	1	1	.833		
1928–29	Independent	–	–	–	–	–	–	–	–	–	11	6	4	1	.591		
1929–30	Independent	–	–	–	–	–	–	–	–	–	13	3	8	2	.308		
1930–31	Independent	–	–	–	–	–	–	–	–	–	12	7	5	0	.583		
1931–32	Independent	–	–	–	–	–	–	–	–	–	8	0	8	0	.000		
1932–33	Independent	–	–	–	–	–	–	–	–	–	7	1	6	0	.143		
1933–34	Independent	–	–	–	–	–	–	–	–	–	12	5	6	1	.458		
1934–35	Independent	–	–	–	–	–	–	–	–	–	12	6	4	2	.583		
1935–36	Independent	–	–	–	–	–	–	–	–	–	13	7	6	0	.538		
Carl Lundholm (1936–1937)
1936–37	Independent	–	–	–	–	–	–	–	–	–	8	3	5	0	.375		
Ernest Christensen (1937–1938)
1937–38	Independent	–	–	–	–	–	–	–	–	–	10	6	3	1	.650		
George Thurston (1938–1939)
1938–39	Independent	–	–	–	–	–	–	–	–	–	9	5	4	0	.556		
Anthony Dougal (1939–1943)
1939–40	Independent	–	–	–	–	–	–	–	–	–	10	1	9	0	.100		
1940–41	Independent	–	–	–	–	–	–	–	–	–	12	5	7	0	.417		
1941–42	Independent	–	–	–	–	–	–	–	–	–	14	4	10	0	.286		
1942–43	Independent	–	–	–	–	–	–	–	–	–	2	1	1	0	.500		
Program suspended due to World War II
Anthony Dougal (1946–1947)
1946–47	Independent	–	–	–	–	–	–	–	–	–	5	4	1	0	.800		
Joseph Petroski (1947–1951)
1947–48	Independent	–	–	–	–	–	–	–	–	–	13	4	9	0	.308		
1948–49	Independent	–	–	–	–	–	–	–	–	–	3	0	3	0	.000		
1949–50	Independent	–	–	–	–	–	–	–	–	–	4	0	4	0	.000		
1950–51	Independent	–	–	–	–	–	–	–	–	–	9	5	4	0	.556		
Horace "Pepper" Martin (1951–1962)
1951–52	Independent	–	–	–	–	–	–	–	–	–	10	5	5	0	.500		
1952–53	Independent	–	–	–	–	–	–	–	–	–	9	3	6	0	.333		
1953–54	Independent	–	–	–	–	–	–	–	–	–	8	2	5	1	.313		
1954–55	Independent	–	–	–	–	–	–	–	–	–	13	5	8	0	.385		
1955–56	Independent	–	–	–	–	–	–	–	–	–	14	3	11	0	.214		
1956–57	Independent	–	–	–	–	–	–	–	–	–	15	7	7	1	.500		
1957–58	Independent	–	–	–	–	–	–	–	–	–	16	13	3	0	.813		
1958–59	Independent	–	–	–	–	–	–	–	–	–	19	14	5	0	.737		
1959–60	Independent	–	–	–	–	–	–	–	–	–	19	11	8	0	.579		
1960–61	Independent	–	–	–	–	–	–	–	–	–	14	3	11	0	.214		
1961–62	ECAC Hockey	17	10	7	0	–	–	–	.588	11th	18	10	7	1	.583		
A. Barr Snively (1962–1964)
1962–63	ECAC Hockey	19	9	10	0	–	–	–	.474	13th	20	10	10	0	.500		
1963–64	ECAC Hockey	25	13	12	0	–	–	–	.520	15th	25	13	12	0	.520		
College Division
Rube Bjorkman (1964–1968)
1964–65	ECAC 2	15	6	9	0	–	–	–	.400	–	20	6	14	0	.300		
1965–66	ECAC 2	16	11	5	0	–	–	–	.688	–	23	11	12	0	.478	Lost Semifinal, 1–2 (Colby)	
University Division
1966–67	ECAC Hockey†	9	5	4	0	–	–	–	.556	7th	25	18	7	0	.720		
1967–68	ECAC Hockey†	13	7	6	0	–	–	–	.538	9th	29	22	7	0	.759		
Charlie Holt (1968–1986)
1968–69	ECAC Hockey	16	10	5	1	–	–	–	.656	5th	29	22	6	1	.776	Lost Quarterfinal, 3–4 (OT) (Harvard)	
1969–70	ECAC Hockey	17	9	6	2	–	–	–	.588	7th	31	19	10	2	.645	Lost Quarterfinal, 0–2 (Boston University)	
1970–71	ECAC Hockey	20	11	9	0	–	–	–	.550	9th	29	20	9	0	.690		
1971–72	ECAC Hockey	18	12	6	0	–	–	–	.667	5th	30	20	10	0	.667	Won Quarterfinal, 5–3 (Pennsylvania); Lost Semifinal, 3–6 (Cornell); Won Third-place game, 4–1 (Harvard)	
1972–73	ECAC Hockey	19	11	8	0	–	–	–	.579	5th	29	16	10	3	.603	Lost Quarterfinal, 2–4 (Boston College)	
Division I
1973–74	ECAC Hockey	20	15	5	0	–	–	–	.750	1st	31	22	9	0	.710	Lost Quarterfinal, 6–7 (OT) (Rensselaer)	
1974–75	ECAC Hockey	25	17	7	1	–	–	–	.700	5th	31	21	9	1	.694	Lost Quarterfinal, 2–4 (Cornell)	
1975–76	ECAC Hockey	28	22	6	0	–	–	–	.786	2nd	31	24	7	0	.774	Lost Quarterfinal, 3–4 (Harvard)	
1976–77	ECAC Hockey	27	21	6	0	–	–	–	.778	2nd	39	27	12	0	.692	Won Quarterfinal, 4–3 (OT) (Brown); Won Semifinal, 10–9 (OT) (Cornell); Lost Championship, 6–8 (Boston University)	Lost Semifinal, 3–4 (OT) (Wisconsine); Lost Third-place game, 5–6 (Boston University)
1977–78	ECAC Hockey	25	14	11	0	–	–	–	.560	8th	30	18	12	0	.600	Lost Quarterfinal, 5–6 (OT) (Boston University)	
1978–79	ECAC Hockey	25	17	5	3	–	–	–	.740	2nd	35	22	10	3	.671	Won Quarterfinal, 9–2 (Yale); Won Semifinal, 4–2 (Cornell); Won Championship, 3–2 (Dartmouth)	Lost Semifinal, 3–4 (Minnesota); Lost Third-place game, 3–7 (Dartmouth)
1979–80	ECAC Hockey	24	9	15	0	–	–	–	.375	13th	30	12	18	0	.400		
1980–81	ECAC Hockey	24	13	10	1	–	–	–	.563	8th	33	19	13	1	.591	Lost Quarterfinal, 3–4 (Clarkson)	
1981–82	ECAC Hockey	22	15	7	0	–	–	–	.682	3rd	36	22	14	0	.611	Won Quarterfinal, 4–2 (Providence); Lost Semifinal, 2–4 (Northeastern); Won Third-place game, 6–5 (Clarkson)	Won Quarterfinal series, 9–4 (Michigan State); Lost Semifinal, 0–5 (Wisconsin); Lost Third-place game, 4–10 (Northeastern)
1982–83	ECAC Hockey	21	15	5	1	–	–	–	.738	T–2nd	35	22	11	2	.657	Won Quarterfinal series, 9–5 (Boston University); Lost Semifinal, 3–6 (Harvard); Won Third-place game, 5–2 (St. Lawrence)	Lost Quarterfinal series, 8–16 (Minnesota)
1983–84	ECAC Hockey	21	13	8	0	–	–	–	.619	T–5th	38	20	17	1	.375	Lost Quarterfinal series 1–2 (Boston University)	
1984–85	Hockey East	34	12	21	1	–	–	–	25	4th	43	16	26	1	.384	Lost Quarterfinal series, 1–2 (Lowell)	
1985–86	Hockey East	34	5	27	2	–	–	–	12	T–6th	37	5	29	3	.176	Lost Quarterfinal series, 4–5 (Boston University)	
Bob Kullen (1986–1987)
1986–87	Hockey East	32	5	24	3	–	–	–	13	7th	38	8	27	3	.250		
Dave O'Connor (1987–1988)
1987–88	Hockey East	26	6	18	2	–	–	–	14	7th	30	7	20	3	.283		
Bob Kullen (1988–1990)
1988–89	Hockey East	26	9	17	0	–	–	–	18	6th	34	12	22	0	.353	Lost Semifinal, 4–5 (OT) (Northeastern)	
1989–90	Hockey East	21	8	9	4	–	–	–	20	T–5th	39	17	17	5	.500	Won Quarterfinal series, 2–1 (Providence); Lost Semifinal, 4–5 (OT) (Boston College)	
Dick Umile (1990–2018)
1990–91	Hockey East	21	10	9	2	–	–	–	22	T–4th	35	22	11	2	.657	Lost Quarterfinal, 1–4 (Providence)	
1991–92	Hockey East	21	15	4	2	–	–	–	32	1st^	37	24	11	2	.556	Won Quarterfinal, 4–2 (Northeastern); Won Semifinal, 5–3 (Providence); Lost Championship, 1–4 (Maine)	Lost Regional semifinal, 2–4 (Wisconsin)
1992–93	Hockey East	24	11	11	2	–	–	–	24	3rd	38	18	17	3	.513	Won Quarterfinal series, 2–0 (Merrimack); Lost Semifinal, 0–2 (Boston University); Lost Consolation Game, 4–5 (OT) (Massachusetts–Lowell)	
1993–94	Hockey East	24	13	9	2	–	–	–	28	3rd	40	25	12	3	.663	Won Quarterfinal series, 2–0 (Boston College); Lost Semifinal, 2–4 (Massachusetts–Lowell); Tied Consolation Game, 4–4 (OT) (Northeastern)	Won Regional Quarterfinal, 2–0 (Rensselaer); Lost Regional semifinal, 1–7 (Harvard)
1994–95	Hockey East	24	14	6	4	–	–	0	78	3rd	36	22	10	4	.667	Lost Quarterfinal, 2–3 (OT) (Providence)	Lost Regional Quarterfinal, 2–9 (Denver)
1995–96	Hockey East	24	8	12	6	–	–	4	49	6th	34	12	18	4	.412	Lost Quarterfinal series, 2–0 (Maine)	
1996–97	Hockey East	24	18	6	0	–	–	–	36	T–1st	39	28	11	0	.700	Won Quarterfinal series, 2–0 (Massachusetts); Won Semifinal, 4–0 (Boston College); Lost Championship, 2–4 (Boston University)	Lost Regional Quarterfinal, 2–3 (Colorado College)
1997–98	Hockey East	24	15	5	4	–	–	–	31	3rd	38	25	12	1	.671	Lost Quarterfinal series, 0–2 (Maine)	Won Regional Quarterfinal, 7–4 (Wisconsin); Won Regional semifinal, 4–3 (OT) (Boston University); Lost National semifinal, 0–4 (Michigan)
1998–99	Hockey East	24	18	3	3	–	–	–	39	1st	41	31	7	3	.793	Won Quarterfinal series, 2–0 (Merrimack); Won Semifinal, 6–2 (Providence); Lost Championship, 4–5 (OT) (Boston College)	Won Regional semifinal, 2–1 (OT) (Michigan); Won National semifinal, 5–3 (Michigan State); Lost National Championship, 2–3 (OT) (Maine)
1999–00	Hockey East	24	13	5	6	–	–	–	32	2nd	38	23	9	6	.684	Won Quarterfinal series, 2–0 (Merrimack); Lost Semifinal, 1–2 (Boston College)	Lost Regional semifinal, 1–4 (Niagara)
2000–01	Hockey East	24	11	8	5	–	–	–	27	4th	39	21	12	6	.615	Lost Quarterfinal series, 1–2 (Massachusetts–Lowell)	
2001–02	Hockey East	24	17	4	3	–	–	–	37	1st	40	30	7	3	.788	Won Quarterfinal series, 2–0 (Merrimack); Won Semifinal, 4–3 (Massachusetts–Lowell); Won Championship, 3–1 (Maine)	Won Regional semifinal, 4–3 (Cornell); Lost National semifinal, 2–7 (Maine)
2002–03	Hockey East	24	15	5	4	–	–	–	34	T–1st	42	28	8	6	.738	Won Quarterfinal series, 2–0 (Massachusetts–Lowell); Won Semifinal, 5–4 (Massachusetts); Won Championship, 1–0 (OT) (Boston University)	Won Regional semifinal, 5–2 (St. Cloud State); Won Regional final, 3–0 (Boston University); Won National semifinal, 3–2 (Cornell); Lost National Championship, 1–5 (Minnesota)
2003–04	Hockey East	24	10	8	6	–	–	–	26	4th	41	20	15	6	.561	Won Quarterfinal series, 2–1 (Providence); Lost Semifinal, 2–5 (Massachusetts)	Lost Regional semifinal, 1–4 (Michigan)
2004–05	Hockey East	24	15	5	4	–	–	–	34	T–2nd	42	26	11	5	.679	Won Quarterfinal series, 2–0 (Northeastern); Won Semifinal, 5–2 (Boston University); Lost Championship, 1–3 (Boston College)	Won Regional semifinal, 3–2 (OT) (Harvard); Lost Regional final, 2–4 (Denver)
2005–06	Hockey East	27	14	7	6	–	–	–	34	4th	40	20	13	7	.588	Won Quarterfinal series, 2–0 (Providence); Lost Semifinal, 2–9 (Boston University)	Lost Regional semifinal, 0–1 (Michigan State)
2006–07	Hockey East	27	18	7	2	–	–	–	38	1st	39	26	11	2	.692	Won Quarterfinal series, 2–0 (Providence); Won Semifinal, 3–2 (2OT) (Massachusetts); Lost Championship, 2–5 (Boston College)	Lost Regional semifinal, 1–2 (Miami)
2007–08	Hockey East	27	19	5	3	–	–	–	41	1st	38	25	10	3	.697	Won Quarterfinal series, 2–0 (Massachusetts); Lost Semifinal, 4–5 (3OT) (Boston College)	Lost Regional semifinal, 3–7 (Notre Dame)
2008–09	Hockey East	27	18	6	3	–	–	–	39	2nd	38	20	13	5	.592	Lost Quarterfinal series, 0–2 (Boston College)	Won Regional semifinal, 6–5 (OT) (North Dakota); Lost Regional final, 1–2 (Boston University)
2009–10	Hockey East	27	15	6	6	–	–	–	36	1st	39	18	14	7	.551	Lost Quarterfinal series, 1–2 (Vermont)	Won Regional semifinal, 6–2 (Cornell); Lost Regional final, 2–6 (RIT)
2010–11	Hockey East	27	17	6	4	–	–	–	38	2nd	39	22	11	6	.641	Won Quarterfinal series, 2–0 (Vermont); Lost Semifinal, 1–4 (Merrimack)	Won Regional semifinal, 1–3 (Miami); Lost Regional final, 1–2 (Notre Dame)
2011–12	Hockey East	27	11	14	2	–	–	–	24	6th	37	15	19	3	.446	Lost Quarterfinal series, 1–2 (Boston University)	
2012–13	Hockey East	27	13	8	6	–	–	–	32	T–3rd	39	20	12	7	.603	Lost Quarterfinal series, 1–2 (Providence)	Won Regional semifinal, 5–2 (Denver); Lost Regional final, 0–2 (Massachusetts–Lowell)
2013–14	Hockey East	20	11	9	0	–	–	–	22	T–4th	41	22	18	1	.549	Won Quarterfinal series, 2–1 (Northeastern); Won Semifinal, 3–1 (Providence); Lost Championship, 0–4 (Massachusetts–Lowell)	
2014–15	Hockey East	22	10	11	1	–	–	–	21	8th	40	19	19	2	.500	Won Opening Round series, 2–0 (Connecticut); Won Quarterfinal series, 2–1 (Providence); Lost Semifinal, 1–4 (Boston University)	
2015–16	Hockey East	22	4	12	6	–	–	–	14	10th	37	11	20	6	.378	Lost Opening Round series, 1–2 (Merrimack)	
2016–17	Hockey East	22	7	11	4	–	–	–	18	10th	40	15	20	5	.438	Won Opening Round series, 2–1 (Merrimack); Lost Quarterfinal series, 1–2 (Massachusetts–Lowell)	
2017–18	Hockey East	24	5	15	5	–	–	–	15	11th	36	10	20	6	.361	Lost Opening Round series, 0–2 (Maine)	
Michael Souza (2018–Present)
2018–19	Hockey East	24	8	10	6	–	–	–	22	8th	36	12	15	9	.458	Lost Quarterfinal series, 0–2 (Massachusetts)	
2019–20	Hockey East	24	9	12	3	–	–	–	21	9th	34	15	15	4	.500		
2020–21	Hockey East	21	5	13	3	3	3	2	.317	10th	23	6	14	3	.326	Won Opening Round, 7–2 (Maine); Lost Quarterfinal, 2–3 (Boston College)	
2021–22	Hockey East	24	8	15	1	2	2	0	25	9th	34	14	19	1	.426	Lost Opening Round, 3–4 (OT) (Boston College)	
2022–23	Hockey East	24	6	15	3	2	2	2	23	10th	35	11	20	3	.368	Lost Opening Round, 1–2 (OT) (Providence)	
2023–24	Hockey East	24	12	11	1	1	0	0	36	T–5th	36	20	15	1	.569	Won Opening Round, 1–0 (Massachusetts Lowell); Lost Quarterfinal, 0–5 (Maine)	
2024–25	Hockey East	24	5	14	5	0	2	1	23	10th	35	13	16	6	.457	Lost Opening Round, 2–3 (OT) (Massachusetts Lowell)	
Totals											GP	W	L	T	%	Championships	
Regular season											2382	1232	932	178	.564	1 ECAC Hockey Championships, 7 Hockey East Championships	
Conference Post-season											137	67	67	3	.500	1 ECAC Hockey tournament championships, 2 Hockey East tournament championships	
NCAA Post-season											42	16	26	0	.381	22 NCAA Tournament appearances	
Regular season and Post-season Record											2561	1325	1055	181	.553		

* Winning percentage is used when conference schedules are unbalanced.
† UNH played a partial ECAC schedule.
^ After the season Maine was retroactively forced to forfeit 13 games. The record here represents official results.
