= 1982 CCHA men's ice hockey tournament =

Sports tournament

1982 CCHA Men's ice hockey tournament
- Dates: March 5–13, 1982
- Teams: 8
- Finals site: Joe Louis Arena; Detroit, Michigan
- Champions: Michigan State (1st title)
- Winning coach: Ron Mason (4th title)
- MVP: Ron Scott (Michigan State)
- CCHA Men's Ice Hockey Tournaments

The 1982 CCHA Men's Ice Hockey Tournament was the 11th CCHA Men's Ice Hockey Tournament. It was played between March 5 and March 13, 1982. First round games were played at campus sites, while 'final four' games were played at Joe Louis Arena in Detroit, Michigan for the first time. By winning the tournament, Michigan State received the Central Collegiate Hockey Association's automatic bid to the 1982 NCAA Division I Men's Ice Hockey Tournament.

== Format ==
The tournament featured three rounds of play. The four teams that finished below eighth place in the standings were not eligible for postseason play. In the quarterfinals, the first and eighth seeds, the second and seventh seeds, the third seed and sixth seeds and the fourth seed and fifth seeds played a two-game series where the team that scored the higher number of goals after the games was declared the victor and advanced to the semifinals. In the semifinals, the remaining highest and lowest seeds and second highest and second lowest seeds play a single-game, with the winners advancing to the finals. The tournament champion receives an automatic bid to the 1982 NCAA Division I Men's Ice Hockey Tournament.

== Conference standings ==
Note: GP = Games played; W = Wins; L = Losses; T = Ties; PTS = Points; GF = Goals For; GA = Goals Against

1981–82 Central Collegiate Hockey Association standings
	Conference							Overall					
	GP	W	L	T	PTS	GF	GA	GP	W	L	T	GF	GA
Bowling Green†	28	20	7	1	41	164	105	42	27	13	2	235	163
Michigan State*	32	21	10	1	43	138	94	42	26	14	2	184	123
Michigan Tech	28	16	11	1	33	129	120	40	23	14	3	195	165
Notre Dame	30	15	13	2	32	139	130	40	23	15	2	199	168
Michigan	30	14	12	4	32	93	101	38	18	15	5	130	131
Ferris State	30	13	15	2	28	117	133	36	15	18	3	144	158
Lake Superior State	28	11	15	2	24	112	110	39	19	17	3	165	150
Northern Michigan	28	12	16	0	24	106	127	36	15	21	0	141	171
Western Michigan	30	11	18	1	23	129	150	34	14	19	1	141	164
Ohio State	28	10	17	1	21	107	132	34	16	17	1	158	150
Miami	28	9	18	1	19	100	132	36	16	19	1	163	153
Championship: Michigan State † indicates conference regular season champion * indicates conference tournament champion

== Bracket ==
Quarterfinals; March 5–7
1	Bowling Green	8	10	18
8	Northern Michigan	0	5	5
2	Michigan State	9	3	12
7	Lake Superior State	1	4	5
3	Michigan Tech	7	3	10
6	Ferris State	4	3	7
4	Notre Dame	6	5	11
5	Michigan	5	3	8

Semifinals; March 11
1	Bowling Green	5
4	Notre Dame	8
2	Michigan State	3
3	Michigan Tech	2

Championship; March 13
2	Michigan State	4
4	Notre Dame	1
Consolation Game
1	Bowling Green	2
3	Michigan Tech	1

Note: * denotes overtime period(s)

=== First round ===
==== (1) Bowling Green vs. (8) Northern Michigan ====
Bowling Green won series

==== (2) Michigan State vs. (7) Lake Superior State ====
Michigan State won series

==== (3) Michigan Tech vs. (6) Ferris State ====
Michigan Tech won series

==== (4) Notre Dame vs. (5) Michigan ====
Notre Dame won series

=== Semifinals ===
==== (1) Bowling Green vs. (4) Notre Dame ====
March 11	Bowling Green	5 – 8	Notre Dame	Joe Louis Arena

==== (2) Michigan State vs. (3) Michigan Tech ====
March 11	Michigan State	3 – 2	Michigan Tech	Joe Louis Arena

=== Consolation Game ===
==== (1) Bowling Green vs. (3) Michigan Tech ====
March 13	Bowling Green	2 – 1	Michigan Tech	Joe Louis Arena

=== Championship ===
==== (2) Michigan State vs. (4) Notre Dame ====
March 13	Michigan State	4 – 1	Notre Dame	Joe Louis Arena

== Tournament awards ==
=== MVP ===
- Ron Scott (Michigan State)
