= Tim Thomas (ice hockey, born 1963) =

American ice hockey player

- Born: May 28, 1963 (age 62) Richfield, Minnesota, USA
- Height: 6 ft 0 in (183 cm)
- Weight: 187 lb (85 kg; 13 st 5 lb)
- Position: Defenseman
- Shot: Left
- Played for: Tappara; Diables Noirs de Tours; Nijmegen Tigers
- National team: United States
- Playing career: 1981–1992

Tim Thomas is an American former ice hockey defenseman who was an All-American for Wisconsin and won a Liiga championship in 1987.

== Career ==
Thomas was a member of Bob Johnson's final recruiting class and began playing at Wisconsin a year after the team won their third NCAA championship. The Badgers were still a powerful team in Thomas' first season, winning the WCHA Tournament and returning to the national championship game, only to conference rival North Dakota. Thomas had played well that season and was invited to participate at the 1982 World Junior Ice Hockey Championships. Team USA finished in 6th, a typical result for the team. The next season began shaping up even better for Thomas. Wisconsin looked ready to compete for a championship again while he spent time as both a forward and defenseman. Thomas played in his second WJC and, though he wasn't able to help them finish in the medals, Thomas led the US National team in scoring. His stellar play earned him an invite to the National Team for the upcoming World Championships and he remained with the national team for the remainder of the year. Thomas helped the US win pool-B with an undefeated record and a promotion to the top bracket for the subsequent world championship.

With Wisconsin having won a National Championship in his absence, Thomas remained with Team USA for the next season as they prepared for the 1984 Winter Olympics. He played through the entire season with the program and was even included on the Olympic roster, but he didn't play in any of the games. After a disappointing 7th-place finish, Thomas left the national team and returned to Wisconsin. The team had fallen off the pace after making three consecutive championship games and was now playing just well enough to not make tournament appearances. Upon his return, Thomas produced a monster offensive season, leading the team with 50 assists and finishing second at 63 points. He led all defensemen in the nation in scoring and was named an All-American. After Wisconsin was eliminated from the playoffs, he rejoined the US national team one final time at the World Championships, helping the team to a 4th-place finish.

In his senior season, Thomas's numbers slipped a bit but he was still able to help Wisconsin to a 27-win season. The team, however, was swept in the conference semifinals and missed out on another NCAA tournament. Immediately after the season was over, Thomas began his professional career and played the rest of the season with the Indianapolis Checkers. Despite posting good numbers, he ended up playing the next season in Finland. He joined reigning league champion Tappara and helped the club repeat with their 6th championship.

He was back in North America the following season but ended up playing just 10 games for the Baltimore Skipjacks. He headed back to Europe in 1988 and played a year with Diables Noirs de Tours. After sitting out for a few seasons, Thomas ended his playing career with the Nijmegen Tigers in 1992.

== Statistics ==
=== Regular season and playoffs ===
			Regular Season					Playoffs
Season	Team	League	GP	G	A	Pts	PIM	GP	G	A	Pts	PIM
1981–82	Wisconsin	WCHA	44	10	18	28	33	—	—	—	—	—
1982–83	Wisconsin	WCHA	23	7	7	14	31	—	—	—	—	—
1984–85	Wisconsin	WCHA	42	13	50	63	62	—	—	—	—	—
1985–86	Wisconsin	WCHA	42	11	38	49	122	—	—	—	—	—
1985–86	Indianapolis Checkers	IHL	10	3	5	8	15	5	0	2	2	2
1986–87	Tappara Tampere	SM-liiga	44	4	3	7	50	9	1	2	3	15
1987–88	Baltimore Skipjacks	AHL	10	2	4	6	7	—	—	—	—	—
1988–89	ASG Tours	Nationale 1A	30	17	22	39	66	—	—	—	—	—
1991–92	Nijmegen Tigers	Eredivisie	10	3	6	9	4	—	—	—	—	—
NCAA totals			151	41	113	154	248	—	—	—	—	—

=== International ===
Year	Team	Event	Result	GP	G	A	Pts	PIM
1982	United States	WJC	6th	7	0	3	3	10
1983	United States	WJC	5th	7	4	5	9	4
1983	United States	WC-B	1st	—	—	—	—	—
1983–84	United States	International	—	56	—	—	—	—
1984	United States	Olympics	7th	0	0	0	0	0
1985	United States	WC	4th	10	0	2	2	16

== Awards and honors ==
Award	Year
All-WCHA First Team	1984–85
AHCA West Second-Team All-American	1984–85
