= Gord Sherven =

Canadian ice hockey player

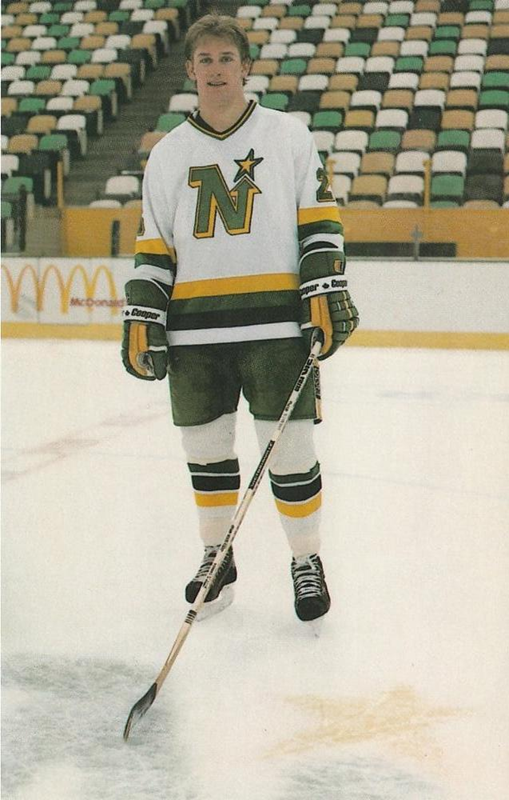
- Sherven in 1985 postcard
- Born: August 21, 1963 (age 63) Gravelbourg, Saskatchewan, Canada
- Height: 6 ft 0 in (183 cm)
- Weight: 185 lb (84 kg; 13 st 3 lb)
- Position: Forward
- Played for: Edmonton Oilers; Minnesota North Stars; Hartford Whalers
- National team: Canada
- NHL draft: 197th overall, 1981; Edmonton Oilers
- Playing career: 1984–2000
Medal record
Representing Canada
Ice hockey
World Championships
Bronze medal – third place	1983 West Germany

Gordon R. Sherven (born August 21, 1963) is a Canadian former professional ice hockey forward. He played 97 games in the National Hockey League with the Edmonton Oilers, Minnesota North Stars, and Hartford Whalers between 1984 and 1988. He later moved to Germany and played there from 1988 to 2000. Internationally Sherven played for the Canadian national team at the 1983 World Junior and senior World Championships, as well as the 1988 Winter Olympics.

== Playing career ==
Sherven was born in Gravelbourg, Saskatchewan and raised in Mankota, Saskatchewan. He was selected by the Edmonton Oilers in the tenth round of the 1981 NHL entry draft. He played three seasons of collegiate hockey for the University of North Dakota from 1981–84, including the championship team of the 1982 NCAA Men's Division I Ice Hockey Tournament. He also played for the Canada national junior hockey team that won the bronze medal at the 1983 World Junior Ice Hockey Championships and the senior national team that won the bronze medal at the 1983 World Ice Hockey Championships only four months later. Only on two other occasions have Canadian players played for both the junior team and the senior team in the same year.

Sherven made his National Hockey League debut in the 1983–84 season, playing in only two games with the Oilers and scoring one goal. He played in 37 games with the club the following season, and also played 5 games with the minor league affiliate Nova Scotia Oilers. He was traded to the Minnesota North Stars mid-season, and played in 32 regular season games and 3 playoff games for the North Stars. In 1985–86, he was traded back to the Oilers, but spent most of that season in Nova Scotia. He was claimed by the Hartford Whalers before the 1986–87 season, but only played 7 games with the team that season, and a single game in the following season.

Sherven played for the Canadian national team for most of the 1986–87 and 1987–88 seasons. At the time, professionals were allowed to compete in the Olympic Games, but full-time NHL players were not released from their club teams to play for their national teams. Therefore, the Canadian national team typically included top NHL prospects and veteran pros with NHL experience, and they played full seasons together all over the world against both national and club teams in preparation for the Games. Sherven was a member of the Canadian team that finished fourth in ice hockey at the 1988 Winter Olympics, held in Calgary.

Sherven moved to Germany for the 1988–89 season, and spent the next twelve years playing for several teams in the Deutsche Eishockey Liga, including the Star Bulls Rosenheim and Düsseldorfer EG. He retired at the end of the 1999–2000 season.

== Career statistics ==
=== Regular season and playoffs ===
			Regular season					Playoffs
Season	Team	League	GP	G	A	Pts	PIM	GP	G	A	Pts	PIM
1980–81	Weyburn Red Wings	SJHL	44	35	34	69	—	—	—	—	—	—
1981–82	University of North Dakota	WCHA	46	18	25	43	16	—	—	—	—	—
1982–83	University of North Dakota	WCHA	36	12	21	33	16	—	—	—	—	—
1983–84	University of North Dakota	WCHA	10	5	5	10	4	—	—	—	—	—
1983–84	Canadian National Team	Intl	46	9	13	22	13	—	—	—	—	—
1983–84	Edmonton Oilers	NHL	2	1	0	1	0	—	—	—	—	—
1984–85	Edmonton Oilers	NHL	37	9	7	16	10	—	—	—	—	—
1984–85	Nova Scotia Oilers	AHL	5	4	5	9	5	—	—	—	—	—
1984–85	Minnesota North Stars	NHL	32	2	12	14	8	3	0	0	0	0
1985–86	Minnesota North Stars	NHL	13	0	2	2	11	—	—	—	—	—
1985–86	Springfield Indians	AHL	11	3	7	10	8	—	—	—	—	—
1985–86	Edmonton Oilers	NHL	5	1	1	2	4	—	—	—	—	—
1985–86	Nova Scotia Oilers	AHL	38	14	17	31	4	—	—	—	—	—
1986–87	Hartford Whalers	NHL	7	0	0	0	0	—	—	—	—	—
1986–87	Canadian National Team	Intl	56	14	22	36	30	—	—	—	—	—
1987–88	Canadian National Team	Intl	61	16	20	36	30	—	—	—	—	—
1987–88	Hartford Whalers	NHL	1	0	0	0	0	—	—	—	—	—
1988–89	Sportbund DJK Rosenheim	1.GBun	18	10	15	25	6	7	3	4	7	6
1989–90	Sportbund DJK Rosenheim	1.GBun	36	36	21	57	20	10	8	4	12	14
1990–91	Sportbund DJK Rosenheim	1.GBun	43	33	44	77	42	11	16	8	24	6
1990–91	EHC Kloten	NDA	—	—	—	—	—	1	2	1	3	0
1991–92	Sportbund DJK Rosenheim	1.GBun	37	19	40	59	26	10	3	8	11	8
1991–92	Canadian National Team	Intl	3	0	1	1	0	—	—	—	—	—
1992–93	Zürcher SC	NDA	36	20	13	33	24	4	2	3	5	6
1993–94	EC Hedos München	1.GBun	42	21	27	48	29	10	5	8	13	2
1994–95	Maddogs München	DEL	27	16	21	37	12	—	—	—	—	—
1994–95	Star Bulls Rosenheim GmbH	DEL	15	4	16	20	10	7	3	6	9	2
1994–95	Canadian National Team	Intl	1	0	0	0	0	—	—	—	—	—
1995–96	Düsseldorfer EG	DEL	50	20	43	63	36	13	6	9	15	4
1996–97	Düsseldorfer EG	DEL	40	12	18	30	12	4	1	2	3	6
1997–98	Düsseldorfer EG	DEL	44	9	15	24	14	3	0	1	1	2
1998–99	Star Bulls Rosenheim GmbH	DEL	46	13	24	37	28	—	—	—	—	—
1999–00	Star Bulls Rosenheim GmbH	DEL	55	15	23	38	18	—	—	—	—	—
NHL totals			97	13	22	35	33	3	0	0	0	0
1.GBun totals			176	119	147	266	123	48	35	32	67	36
DEL totals			277	89	160	249	130	27	10	18	28	14

=== International ===
Year	Team	Event	GP	G	A	Pts	PIM
1983	Canada	WJC	7	1	3	4	0
1983	Canada	WC	9	2	1	3	2
1988	Canada	OG	8	4	4	8	4
Junior totals			7	1	3	4	0
Senior totals			17	6	5	11	6
