= Craig Ludwig =

American ice hockey player

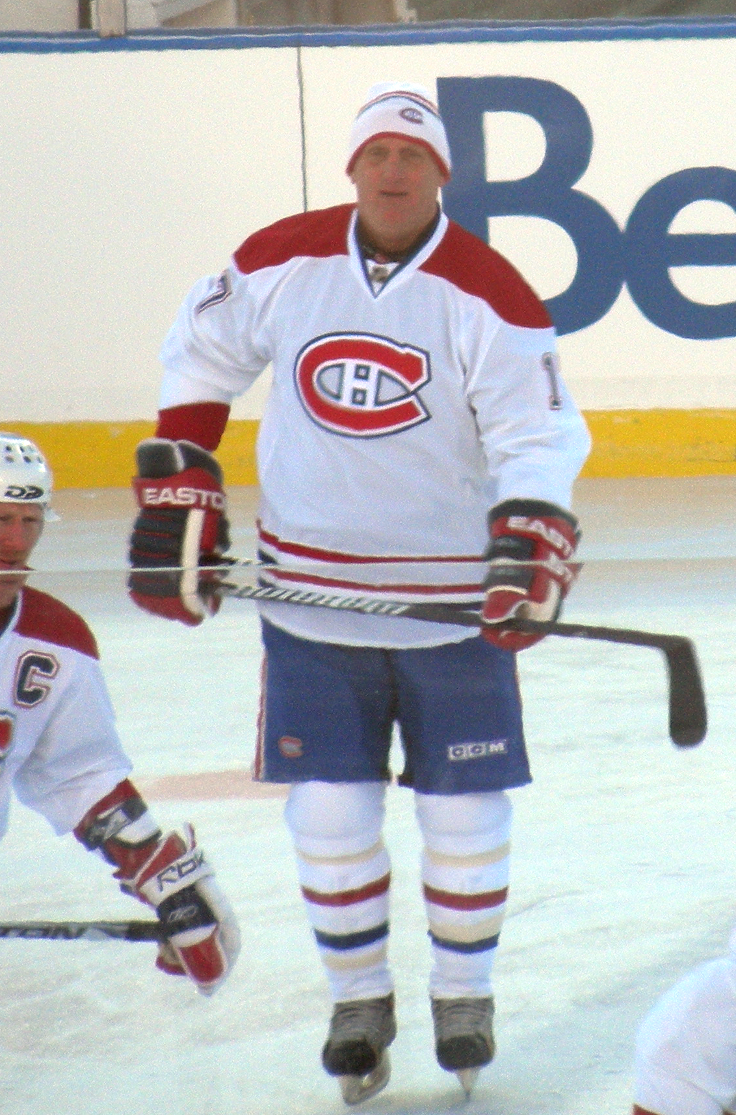
- Ludwig in 2011
- Born: March 15, 1961 (age 65) Rhinelander, Wisconsin, U.S.
- Height: 6 ft 3 in (191 cm)
- Weight: 210 lb (95 kg; 15 st 0 lb)
- Position: Defense
- Shot: Left
- Played for: Montreal Canadiens; New York Islanders; Minnesota North Stars; Dallas Stars
- National team: United States
- NHL draft: 61st overall, 1980; Montreal Canadiens
- Playing career: 1982–1999

Craig Lee Ludwig (born March 15, 1961) is an American former professional hockey player. He played as a defenceman in the National Hockey League from 1982 to 1999 and was renowned for his shot-blocking ability. Ludwig was the color analyst for the Dallas Stars television and radio broadcasts for two seasons, from 2016 to 2018.

== Playing career ==
=== Amateur ===
Ludwig played high school hockey at Northland Pines High School in Eagle River, Wisconsin from 1975–1979. He helped the Eagles to the semi-finals in 1978–1979. He played on the USA Hockey National Junior Team that toured Germany in 1979–80. Ludwig went on to attend the University of North Dakota from 1979–1982 as a walk on. He won two National Championships while playing for the Fighting Sioux, alongside other future NHL players James Patrick, Mark Taylor, Doug Smail, Dave Tippett, Rick Zombo, Phil Sykes, Troy Murray, and Jon Casey.

=== Professional ===
Ludwig was drafted by the Montreal Canadiens in the 3rd round of the 1980 NHL entry draft, 61st overall. He won a Stanley Cup with the team in 1986. In 1990 he was traded to the New York Islanders for Gerald Diduck. After one season with the Isles, Ludwig signed as a free agent with the Minnesota North Stars.

After joining the North Stars in 1991, he moved with the team to Dallas in 1993 and finished his career in 1999 after helping the Dallas Stars win their first Stanley Cup. Ludwig was an alternate captain for the Stars during his time with the team.

== Personal ==
Ludwig was inducted into the Wisconsin Hockey Hall of Fame in 2002. After his retirement, he worked as an assistant coach for the Utah Grizzlies, Dallas Stars, and Texas Tornado. All three of his sons played hockey in college with his younger son, CJ, having played for Northern Michigan and older son Trevor for Providence College and Tyler for the University of Western Michigan. All three also went on to play professionally.

Ludwig assistant coaches in the Dallas Stars Elite hockey club and resides with wife, Kim, in Dallas and Eagle River, WI.

Ludwig currently hosts a podcast called Suds With Luds and is part of the DLLS Sports Stars podcast team.

== Career statistics ==
=== Regular season and playoffs ===
			Regular season					Playoffs
Season	Team	League	GP	G	A	Pts	PIM	GP	G	A	Pts	PIM
1975–76	Northland Pines High School	HS-WI	—	—	—	—	—	—	—	—	—	—
1976–77	Northland Pines High School	HS-WI	—	—	—	—	—	—	—	—	—	—
1977–78	Northland Pines High School	HS-WI	—	—	—	—	—	—	—	—	—	—
1978–79	Northland Pines High School	HS-WI	—	—	—	—	—	—	—	—	—	—
1979–80	University of North Dakota	WCHA	33	1	8	9	32	—	—	—	—	—
1980–81	University of North Dakota	WCHA	34	4	8	12	48	—	—	—	—	—
1981–82	University of North Dakota	WCHA	37	4	17	21	42	—	—	—	—	—
1982–83	Montreal Canadiens	NHL	80	0	25	25	59	3	0	0	0	2
1983–84	Montreal Canadiens	NHL	80	7	18	25	52	15	0	3	3	23
1984–85	Montreal Canadiens	NHL	72	5	14	19	90	12	0	2	2	6
1985–86	Montreal Canadiens	NHL	69	2	4	6	63	20	0	1	1	48
1986–87	Montreal Canadiens	NHL	75	4	12	16	105	17	2	3	5	30
1987–88	Montreal Canadiens	NHL	74	4	10	14	69	11	1	1	2	6
1988–89	Montreal Canadiens	NHL	74	3	13	16	73	21	0	2	2	24
1989–90	Montreal Canadiens	NHL	73	1	15	16	108	11	0	1	1	16
1990–91	New York Islanders	NHL	75	1	8	9	77	—	—	—	—	—
1991–92	Minnesota North Stars	NHL	73	2	9	11	54	7	0	1	1	19
1992–93	Minnesota North Stars	NHL	78	1	10	11	153	—	—	—	—	—
1993–94	Dallas Stars	NHL	84	1	13	14	123	9	0	3	3	8
1994–95	Dallas Stars	NHL	47	2	7	9	61	4	0	1	1	2
1995–96	Dallas Stars	NHL	65	1	2	3	70	—	—	—	—	—
1996–97	Dallas Stars	NHL	77	2	11	13	62	7	0	2	2	18
1997–98	Dallas Stars	NHL	80	0	7	7	131	17	0	1	1	22
1998–99	Dallas Stars	NHL	80	2	6	8	87	23	1	4	5	20
NHL totals			1,256	38	184	222	1,437	177	4	24	28	244

=== International ===
Year	Team	Event	GP	G	A	Pts	PIM
1981	United States	WJC	5	0	0	0	12

== Awards and honors ==
Award	Year
All-WCHA Second Team	1981–82
Stanley Cup	1986, 1999

== See also ==
- List of NHL players with 1,000 games played
