= Gino Gasparini =

American ice hockey coach (born 1945)

Biographical details
- Born: Fort Frances, Ontario, Canada
- Education: University of North Dakota

Playing career
- 1965–1968: North Dakota
- 1968–1969: Toledo Blades
- Position: Center

Coaching career (HC unless noted)
- 1969–1978: North Dakota (assistant)
- 1978–1994: North Dakota

Administrative career (AD unless noted)
- 1985–1990: North Dakota

Head coaching record
- Overall: 392–248–25 (.608)
- Tournaments: 15–4 (.789)

Accomplishments and honors

Championships
- 1979 WCHA Champion; 1979 WCHA Tournament Champion; 1980 WCHA Champion; 1980 WCHA tournament champion 1980 NCAA National Champion; 1982 WCHA Champion; 1982 NCAA national champion 1987 WCHA Champion; 1987 WCHA tournament champion 1987 NCAA national champion

Awards
- 1979 WCHA Coach of the Year; 1982 WCHA Coach of the Year; 1987 WCHA Coach of the Year; 1987 Spencer Penrose Award; 1987 UND Athletic Hall of Fame (individual); 2004 UND Athletic Hall of Fame (1979–80 team); 2005 UND Athletic Hall of Fame (1986–87 team); 2006 UND Athletic Hall of Fame (1981–82 team); 2014 Northwestern Ontario Sports Hall of Fame; 2022 Hobey Baker Legends of College Hockey Award

John "Gino" Gasparini (born 1945) is a former head coach of the University of North Dakota Fighting Sioux men's ice hockey team and former president of the United States Hockey League. Gasparini held a position with St. Cloud State University in 2011–2012 as advisor to the President and is currently an independent sports consultant.

== Career ==
Gasparini played for the Fighting Sioux from 1964–1967 before playing for the Toledo Blades in the IHL for one year. He then returned to the University of North Dakota as a graduate assistant while working on his master's degree before transitioning into an assistant coaching position. Gasparini became head coach of North Dakota in 1978, and also served as the university's athletic director from 1985–1990. Following his coaching career, Gasparini served as Commissioner of the USHL from 1994–2003 and president of the USHL from 2003–2009.

In 2014, Gasparini was inducted into the Northwestern Ontario Sports Hall of Fame in the builders category, and was awarded the Hobey Baker Legends of College Hockey Award in 2022.

A number of players from Gasparini's tenure at North Dakota have gone on to successful coaching careers of their own, including Dave Hakstol, Dane Jackson, Jason Herter, and Scott Sandelin.

== Head coaching record ==
Record table
Season	Team	Overall	Conference	Standing	Postseason
North Dakota Fighting Sioux (WCHA) (1978–1994)
1978–79	North Dakota	30–11–1	22–10–0	1st	NCAA runner-up
1979–80	North Dakota	31–8–1	21–6–1	1st	NCAA Champion
1980–81	North Dakota	21–15–2	14–12–2	t-5th	WCHA first round
1981–82	North Dakota	35–12–0	19–7–0	1st	NCAA Champion
1982–83	North Dakota	21–13–2	16–9–1	2nd	WCHA Semifinals
1983–84	North Dakota	31–12–2	16–8–2	2nd	NCAA consolation game (win)
1984–85	North Dakota	24–16–2	19–14–1	4th	WCHA Semifinals
1985–86	North Dakota	24–16–1	19–14–1	6th	WCHA first round
1986–87	North Dakota	40–8–0	29–6–0	1st	NCAA Champion
1987–88	North Dakota	21–20–1	16–18–1	5th	WCHA third-place game (win)
1988–89	North Dakota	22–18–1	19–15–1	t-3rd	WCHA first round
1989–90	North Dakota	28–13–4	15–10–3	3rd	NCAA first round
1990–91	North Dakota	24–17–2	18–12–2	4th	WCHA third-place game (win)
1991–92	North Dakota	17–21–1	12–19–1	t-7th	WCHA first round
1992–93	North Dakota	12–25–1	11–20–1	8th	WCHA first round
1993–94	North Dakota	11–23–4	11–17–4	8th	WCHA first round
North Dakota:		392–248–25	277–197–21		
Total:		392–248–25			
National champion Postseason invitational champion Conference regular season champion Conference regular season and conference tournament champion Division regular season champion Division regular season and conference tournament champion Conference tournament champion

== See also ==
- List of college men's ice hockey coaches with 400 wins

Sporting positions
Preceded by Rube Bjorkman	Head coach of the University of North Dakota; 1978–1994	Succeeded by Dean Blais
Awards and achievements
Preceded by Marshall Johnston; John Giordano; Ralph Backstrom	WCHA Coach of the Year; 1978–79; 1981–82; 1986–87	Succeeded by Brad Buetow; Mike Sertich; Herb Boxer
Preceded by Ralph Backstrom	Spencer Penrose Award; 1986–87	Succeeded by Frank Anzalone
Preceded by Mike Sertich	Hobey Baker Legends of College Hockey Award; 2022	Succeeded by Jerry York
