= Newell Brown =

Canadian ice hockey player and coach

- Born: February 14, 1962 (age 64) Cornwall, Ontario, Canada
- Height: 5 ft 9 in (175 cm)
- Weight: 180 lb (82 kg; 12 st 12 lb)
- Position: Centre
- Shot: Right
- Played for: Fredericton Express (AHL); Muskegon Lumberjacks (IHL)
- National team: Canada
- NHL draft: 158th overall, 1982; Vancouver Canucks
- Playing career: 1984–1986
- Coaching career

Biographical details
- Education: Michigan State University

Playing career
- 1980–1984: Michigan State

Coaching career (HC unless noted)
- 1987–1990: Michigan State (Assistant)
- 1990–1992: Michigan Tech
- 1992–1996: Adirondack Red Wings
- 1996–1998: Chicago Blackhawks (Assistant)
- 1998–2000: Mighty Ducks of Anaheim (Assistant)
- 2000–2004: Columbus Blue Jackets (Assistant)
- 2005–2010: Anaheim Ducks (Assistant)
- 2010–2013: Vancouver Canucks (Assistant)
- 2013–2017: Arizona Coyotes (Assistant)
- 2017–2021: Vancouver Canucks (Assistant)
- 2021–2024: Anaheim Ducks (Assistant)
- 2024–present: Los Angeles Kings (Assistant)

Head coaching record
- Overall: 66–129–8 (.345) [College]

Newell Brown (born February 14, 1962) is a Canadian former professional ice hockey player who is an assistant coach with the Los Angeles Kings of the National Hockey League (NHL). He was selected by the Vancouver Canucks in the 8th round (158th overall) of the 1982 NHL entry draft.

== Playing career ==
Brown spent two seasons with the Cornwall Royals of the Quebec Major Junior Hockey League where he helped the Royals capture the 1980 Memorial Cup. Brown then attended Michigan State University where he played four seasons with the Michigan State Spartans, registering 66 goals and 186 points in 146 games played.

Turning professional, Brown split the 1984–85 season between the Fredericton Express of the American Hockey League (AHL) and the Muskegon Lumberjacks of the International Hockey League (IHL). He then joined the Canada men's national ice hockey team where he was the team's captain during the 1985–86 season.

== Coaching career ==
Brown started his coaching career in 1986, serving three years as an assistant coach with the Michigan State Spartans before taking on the head coaching duties with the Michigan Tech Huskies for the 1990–91 and 1991–92 seasons.

Brown joined the Adirondack Red Wings of the AHL as head coach in 1992, guiding the team for four seasons before accepting an assistant coaching position in the NHL with the Chicago Blackhawks in 1996. Brown also served as an assistant coach with the Anaheim Ducks, Columbus Blue Jackets, and Vancouver Canucks, before joining the coaching staff of the Arizona Coyotes on July 10, 2013. On June 7, 2017, Brown returned to the Canucks as an assistant coach. He was on the Ducks' coaching staff in 2007 when the franchise won its only Stanley Cup championship.

At the end of the 2020–21 NHL season, Brown's contract was not extended by the Vancouver Canucks. On July 7, 2021, he was rehired by the Ducks for a third stint with the franchise as an assistant coach, joining Dallas Eakins' staff. On May 30, 2024, he was rehired by the Kings as an assistant coach, joining Jim Hiller's staff

=== International ===
Brown was Team Canada's head coach when they won the silver medal at the 1988 Spengler Cup.

== Personal life ==
Brown is the uncle of Dallas Stars forward Matt Duchene.

== Head coaching record ==
=== College ===
Record table
Season	Team	Overall	Conference	Standing	Postseason
Michigan Tech Huskies (WCHA) (1990–1992)
1990–91	Michigan Tech	13–25–3	9–21–2	7th	WCHA First Round
1991–92	Michigan Tech	16–22–1	14–17–1	6th	WCHA First Round
Michigan Tech:		29–47–4	23–38–3		
Total:		29–47–4			

== Awards and honours ==
Award	Year
All-CCHA Second Team	1981-82
CCHA All-Tournament Team	1984
