= 1982 ECAC Hockey men's ice hockey tournament =

Sports event

1982 ECAC Men's ice hockey tournament
- Dates: March 9–13, 1982
- Teams: 8
- Finals site: Boston Garden; Boston, Massachusetts
- Champions: Northeastern (1st title)
- Winning coach: Fern Flaman (1st title)
- MVP: Mark Davidner (Northeastern)
- ECAC Men's Ice Hockey Tournaments

The 1982 ECAC Hockey Men's Ice Hockey Tournament was the 21st tournament in league history. It was played between March 9 and March 13, 1982. Quarterfinal games were played at home team campus sites, while the 'final four' games were played at the Boston Garden in Boston, Massachusetts. By winning the tournament, Northeastern received the ECAC's automatic bid to the 1982 NCAA Division I Men's Ice Hockey Tournament.

This was the last ECAC Hockey tournament won by an East Region team. All teams from that division would later break from the conference to form Hockey East.

== Format ==
The tournament featured three rounds of play, all of which were single-elimination. The three teams that were division champions automatically qualified for the tournament while the remaining five seeds were given to the teams with the highest winning percentage. The top four seeds were given out to the three division champions and the top qualifier and assorted based upon winning percentage. The remaining four seeds were assigned to the other qualifiers and assorted based upon winning percentage. In the quarterfinals the first seed and eighth seed, the second seed and seventh seed, the third seed and sixth seed and the fourth seed and fifth seed played against one another. In the semifinals, the highest seed plays the lowest remaining seed while the two remaining teams play with the winners advancing to the championship game and the losers advancing to the third place game. The tournament champion receives an automatic bid to the 1982 NCAA Division I Men's Ice Hockey Tournament.

== Conference standings ==
Note: GP = Games played; W = Wins; L = Losses; T = Ties; Pct. = Winning percentage; GF = Goals for; GA = Goals against

1981–82 ECAC Hockey standings
	Conference							Overall					
	GP	W	L	T	Pct.	GF	GA	GP	W	L	T	GF	GA
East Region
Northeastern*	21	14	6	1	.690	125	89	36	25	9	2	212	140
New Hampshire	22	15	7	0	.682	116	91	36	22	14	0	176	159
Boston College	21	13	8	0	.619	85	79	30	19	11	0	131	105
Providence	21	13	8	0	.619	119	80	33	20	12	1	162	114
Boston University	22	9	10	3	.477	102	91	28	14	11	3	133	102
Maine	21	3	18	0	.143	67	155	29	8	21	0	113	189
West Region
Clarkson†	20	15	4	1	.775	106	63	35	26	8	1	185	108
St. Lawrence	21	12	8	1	.595	88	74	31	19	11	1	152	116
Colgate	20	11	8	1	.575	96	77	30	19	10	1	177	109
Vermont	22	8	12	2	.409	95	115	29	11	16	2	133	153
Rensselaer	20	6	12	2	.350	76	96	29	9	18	2	110	135
Ivy Region
Harvard	21	11	8	2	.571	106	85	30	13	15	2	126	109
Yale	21	11	9	1	.548	77	76	26	15	10	1	113	93
Cornell	22	10	11	1	.477	92	80	26	12	13	1	107	91
Princeton	21	7	12	2	.381	81	103	26	9	14	3	105	124
Dartmouth	21	6	14	1	.310	85	119	26	10	15	1	113	140
Brown	21	6	15	0	.286	75	121	26	8	18	0	100	155
Independent
Army^	-	-	-	-	-	-	-	36	25	11	0	260	171
Championship: Northeastern † indicates conference regular season champion * indicates conference tournament champion^ Army had been accepted into ECAC Hockey but had not begun a conference schedule

== Bracket ==
Teams are reseeded after the first round

Quarterfinals; March 9
1	Clarkson	7
8	Colgate	4
2	Northeastern	5
7	St. Lawrence	3
3	New Hampshire	4
6	Providence	2
4	Harvard	2
5	Boston College	0

Semifinals; March 12
1	Clarkson	1
4	Harvard	7
2	Northeastern	4
3	New Hampshire	2

Championship; March 13
2	Northeastern	5
4	Harvard	2
Third Place
1	Clarkson	5
3	New Hampshire	6

Note: * denotes overtime period(s)

=== Quarterfinals ===
==== (1) Clarkson vs. (8) Colgate ====
March 9	Clarkson	7 – 4	Colgate	Walker Arena

==== (2) Northeastern vs. (7) St. Lawrence ====
March 9	Northeastern	5 – 3	St. Lawrence	Matthews Arena

==== (3) New Hampshire vs. (6) Providence ====
March 9	New Hampshire	4 – 2	Providence	Snively Arena

==== (4) Harvard vs. (5) Boston College ====
March 9	Harvard	2 – 0	Boston College	Bright Hockey Center

=== Semifinals ===
==== (1) Clarkson vs. (4) Harvard ====
March 12	Clarkson	1 – 7	Harvard	Boston Garden

==== (2) Northeastern vs. (3) New Hampshire ====
March 12	Northeastern	4 – 2	New Hampshire	Boston Garden

=== Third Place ===
==== (1) Clarkson vs. (3) New Hampshire ====
March 13	Clarkson	5 – 6	New Hampshire	Boston Garden

=== Championship ===
==== (2) Northeastern vs. (4) Harvard ====
March 13	Northeastern	5 – 2	Harvard	Boston Garden

== Tournament awards ==
=== All-Tournament Team ===
None

=== MOP ===
- Mark Davidner (Northeastern)
