= Ron Scott =

Canadian ice hockey player

- Born: July 21, 1960 (age 66) Guelph, Ontario, Canada
- Height: 5 ft 8 in (173 cm)
- Weight: 155 lb (70 kg; 11 st 1 lb)
- Position: Goaltender
- Caught: Left
- Played for: New York Rangers; Los Angeles Kings
- NHL draft: Undrafted
- Playing career: 1983–1991

Ronald Scott (born July 21, 1960) is a Canadian former professional ice hockey goaltender. Scott played 28 games in the National Hockey League for the New York Rangers and the Los Angeles Kings between 1984 and 1990. The rest of his career, which lasted from 1983 to 1991, was spent in the minor leagues.

== Amateur career ==
Scott played for the Cornwall Royals in the Quebec Major Junior Hockey League, and also with Michigan State University in the NCAA.

== Professional career ==
Scott began his professional career playing in the Central Hockey League with the Tulsa Oilers. He was member of the Oilers team that suspended operations on February 16, 1984, playing only road games for final six weeks of 1983–84 season. Despite this adversity, the team went on to win the league's championship. Scott went on to play 28 games in the NHL with the New York Rangers and Los Angeles Kings. He also played in the American Hockey League with the New Haven Nighthawks, and in the International Hockey League with the Colorado/Denver Rangers.

== Career statistics ==
=== Regular season and playoffs ===
			Regular season									Playoffs
Season	Team	League	GP	W	L	T	MIN	GA	SO	GAA	SV%	GP	W	L	MIN	GA	SO	GAA	SV%
1978–79	Cornwall Royals	QMJHL	56	21	24	5	2827	248	1	5.26	.844	7	3	4	394	29	1	4.42	.883
1979–80	Cornwall Royals	QMJHL	41	19	11	3	2086	165	0	4.75	.855	16	11	5	904	55	1	3.65	.886
1979–80	Cornwall Royals	M-Cup	—	—	—	—	—	—	—	—	—	5	3	2	301	28	0	5.57	.850
1980–81	Michigan State University	CCHA	40	11	21	1	1899	123	2	3.89	.891	—	—	—	—	—	—	—	—
1981–82	Michigan State University	CCHA	39	24	13	1	2298	109	2	2.85	.901	—	—	—	—	—	—	—	—
1982–83	Michigan State University	CCHA	40	29	9	1	2273	100	2	2.64	.899	—	—	—	—	—	—	—	—
1983–84	New York Rangers	NHL	9	2	3	3	485	29	0	3.59	.885	—	—	—	—	—	—	—	—
1983–84	Tulsa Oilers	CHL	29	13	13	3	1717	109	0	3.81	—	5	—	—	280	20	0	4.28	—
1984–85	New Haven Nighthawks	AHL	36	13	18	4	2047	130	0	3.81	.871	—	—	—	—	—	—	—	—
1985–86	New York Rangers	NHL	4	0	3	0	156	11	0	4.23	.804	—	—	—	—	—	—	—	—
1985–86	New Haven Nighthawks	AHL	19	8	8	1	1069	66	1	3.70	.893	2	1	1	143	8	0	3.36	—
1986–87	New York Rangers	NHL	1	0	0	1	65	5	0	4.62	.857	—	—	—	—	—	—	—	—
1986–87	New Haven Nighthawks	AHL	29	16	7	0	1744	107	2	3.68	.886	—	—	—	—	—	—	—	—
1987–88	New York Rangers	NHL	2	1	1	0	90	6	0	4.00	.854	—	—	—	—	—	—	—	—
1987–88	New Haven Nighthawks	AHL	17	8	7	1	963	49	1	3.05	.903	—	—	—	—	—	—	—	—
1987–88	Colorado Rangers	IHL	8	3	4	0	395	33	0	5.01	.862	5	1	4	259	16	0	3.71	—
1988–89	Denver Rangers	IHL	18	7	11	0	990	79	0	4.79	—	—	—	—	—	—	—	—	—
1989–90	Los Angeles Kings	NHL	12	5	6	0	654	40	0	3.67	.875	1	0	0	32	4	0	7.50	.600
1989–90	New Haven Nighthawks	AHL	22	8	11	1	1224	79	1	3.87	.871	—	—	—	—	—	—	—	—
1990–91	New Haven Nighthawks	AHL	29	5	15	4	1540	104	0	4.05	.868	—	—	—	—	—	—	—	—
NHL totals			28	8	13	4	1450	91	0	3.77	.871	1	0	0	33	4	0	7.45	.600

== Awards and honours ==
Award	Year
All-WCHA First Team	1980–81
All-CCHA First Team	1981–82
AHCA West All-American	1981–82
CCHA Most Valuable Player in Tournament	1982
All-CCHA First Team	1982–83
AHCA West All-American	1982–83

Awards and achievements
Preceded by Aaron Broten	WCHA Freshman of the Year; 1980–81	Succeeded by James Patrick
Preceded by Bill McKenzie	CCHA Most Valuable Player in Tournament; 1982	Succeeded by Mike David
