= 1982 WCHA men's ice hockey tournament =

1982 WCHA Men's ice hockey tournament
- Dates: March 4–14, 1982
- Teams: 6
- Finals site: Winter Sports Center; Grand Forks, North Dakota
- Champions: Wisconsin (6th title)
- Winning coach: Bob Johnson (6th title)
- WCHA Men's Ice Hockey Tournaments

The 1982 WCHA Men's Ice Hockey Tournament was the 23rd conference playoff in league history and 30th season where a WCHA champion was crowned. The tournament was played between March 4 and March 14, 1982. First round and semifinal games were played at home team campus sites while the championship match was held at the Winter Sports Center in Grand Forks, North Dakota. By winning the tournament, Wisconsin received the WCHA's automatic bid to the 1982 NCAA Division I Men's Ice Hockey Tournament.

This as the first WCHA tournament held after the defection of four conference schools to the CCHA.

== Format ==
All member teams were eligible for the tournament and were seeded No. 1 through No. 6 according to their final conference standing, with a tiebreaker system used to seed teams with an identical number of points accumulated. As a result of their receiving the Broadmoor Trophy, North Dakota's home venue, Winter Sports Center, served as the site for the Championship game regardless of which teams qualified for the penultimate match. Each series were two-game matchups with the team that scored the most goals advancing to the succeeding round. The top two seeded teams received byes into the semifinal round while the third seed and sixth seed and the fourth seed and fifth seed met in the first round. The teams that advanced to the semifinal were re-seeded according to the final regular season conference standings, with the first seed matched against lowest remaining seed in one semifinal game and the second seed meeting with the other advancing team with the winners meeting in the championship round. The Tournament Champion received an automatic bid to the 1982 NCAA Division I Men's Ice Hockey Tournament.

=== Conference standings ===
Note: GP = Games played; W = Wins; L = Losses; T = Ties; PTS = Points; GF = Goals For; GA = Goals Against

1981–82 Western Collegiate Hockey Association standings
	Conference							Overall					
	GP	W	L	T	PTS	GF	GA	GP	W	L	T	GF	GA
North Dakota†	26	19	7	0	38	119	81	47	35	12	0	218	143
Wisconsin*	26	18	7	1	37	126	80	47	35	11	1	255	126
Minnesota	26	13	11	2	28	103	102	36	22	12	2	153	125
Denver	26	9	15	2	20	119	132	43	21	19	3	233	197
Minnesota-Duluth	26	9	16	1	19	114	141	40	16	21	3	192	201
Colorado College	26	6	18	2	14	105	150	36	11	23	2	152	196
Championship: Wisconsin † indicates conference regular season champion * indicates conference tournament champion

== Bracket ==
Teams are reseeded after the first round

First Round; March 4–6
3	Minnesota	3	6
6	Colorado College	1	3
4	Denver	5	5
5	Minnesota-Duluth	2	5

Semifinals; March 9–10
1	North Dakota	4	5
4	Denver	3	2
2	Wisconsin	3	6
3	Minnesota	4	2

Championship; March 13–14
1	North Dakota	0	1
2	Wisconsin	9	3

Note: * denotes overtime period(s)

=== First round ===
==== (3) Minnesota vs. (6) Colorado College ====
March 5	Minnesota	3 – 1	Colorado College	Williams Arena

March 6	Minnesota	6 – 3	Colorado College	Williams Arena

Minnesota won series 9–4

==== (4) Denver vs. (5) Minnesota-Duluth ====
March 4	Denver	5 – 2	Minnesota-Duluth	DU Arena

March 5	Denver	5 – 5	Minnesota-Duluth	DU Arena

Denver won series 10–7

=== Semifinals ===
==== (1) North Dakota vs. (4) Denver ====
March 9	North Dakota	4 – 3	Denver	Winter Sports Center

March 10	North Dakota	5 – 2	Denver	Winter Sports Center

North Dakota won series 9–5

==== (2) Wisconsin vs. (3) Minnesota ====
March 9	Wisconsin	3 – 4	Minnesota	Dane County Coliseum

March 10	Wisconsin	6 – 2	Minnesota	Dane County Coliseum

Wisconsin won series 9–6

=== Championship ===
==== (1) North Dakota vs. (2) Wisconsin ====
March 13	North Dakota	0 – 9	Wisconsin	Winter Sports Center

March 14	North Dakota	1 – 3	Wisconsin	Winter Sports Center

Wisconsin won series 12–1

== Tournament awards ==
None

== See also ==
- Western Collegiate Hockey Association men's champions
