= Jim Archibald =

Canadian ice hockey player

- Born: June 6, 1961 (age 64) Craik, Saskatchewan, Canada
- Height: 5 ft 11 in (180 cm)
- Weight: 182 lb (83 kg; 13 st 0 lb)
- Position: Right wing
- Shot: Right
- Played for: Minnesota North Stars
- NHL draft: 139th overall, 1981; Minnesota North Stars
- Playing career: 1985–1988

James L. Archibald (born June 6, 1961) is a Canadian former ice hockey player. He played right wing and played 16 games in the National Hockey League for the Minnesota North Stars between 1985 and 1987. He lives in Brainerd, Minnesota.

After playing in junior level with the Moose Jaw Canucks, Archibald was drafted in the seventh round, 139th overall by the Minnesota North Stars in the 1981 NHL entry draft. He attended school at the University of North Dakota the same year until 1985. In his NHL career he played in 16 regular season games scoring one goal and two assists. He also had spells in the American Hockey League for the Springfield Indians and the International Hockey League with the Kalamazoo Wings.

While head coach at Brainerd, his son, Josh Archibald, played there. After his senior season, Josh was drafted by the Pittsburgh Penguins in the sixth round of the 2011 NHL entry draft. Josh was a finalist for the Minnesota Mr. Hockey Award in 2011.

== Career statistics ==
=== Regular season and playoffs ===
			Regular season					Playoffs
Season	Team	League	GP	G	A	Pts	PIM	GP	G	A	Pts	PIM
1979–80	Moose Jaw Canucks	SJHL	58	36	29	65	253	—	—	—	—	—
1980–81	Moose Jaw Canucks	SJHL	52	46	42	88	308	—	—	—	—	—
1981–82	University of North Dakota	WCHA	41	10	16	26	96	—	—	—	—	—
1982–83	University of North Dakota	WCHA	33	7	14	21	91	—	—	—	—	—
1983–84	University of North Dakota	WCHA	44	21	15	36	156	—	—	—	—	—
1984–85	University of North Dakota	WCHA	41	37	24	61	197	—	—	—	—	—
1984–85	Minnesota North Stars	NHL	4	1	2	3	11	—	—	—	—	—
1984–85	Springfield Indians	AHL	8	1	0	1	5	—	—	—	—	—
1985–86	Minnesota North Stars	NHL	11	0	0	0	32	—	—	—	—	—
1985–86	Springfield Indians	AHL	12	1	7	8	34	—	—	—	—	—
1986–87	Minnesota North Stars	NHL	1	0	0	0	2	—	—	—	—	—
1986–87	Springfield Indians	AHL	66	10	17	27	303	—	—	—	—	—
1987–88	Kalamazoo Wings	IHL	12	0	1	1	73	—	—	—	—	—
AHL totals			86	12	24	36	342	—	—	—	—	—
NHL totals			16	1	2	3	45	—	—	—	—	—

== Awards and honours ==
Award	Year
All-WCHA First Team	1984–85
