= Mark Hamway =

American ice hockey player (born 1961)

- Born: August 9, 1961 (age 63); Detroit, Michigan, U.S.A.
- Height: 6 ft 0 in (183 cm)
- Weight: 185 lb (84 kg; 13 st 3 lb)
- Position: Right wing
- Shot: Right
- Played for: New York Islanders
- NHL draft: 143rd overall, 1980; New York Islanders
- Playing career: 1983–1987

Mark Hamway (born August 9, 1961) is an American retired professional ice hockey player who played 53 games in the National Hockey League between 1985 and 1987 for the New York Islanders. The rest of his career, which lasted between 1983 and 1987, was spent in the minor leagues.

== Career statistics ==
=== Regular season and playoffs ===
			Regular season					Playoffs
Season	Team	League	GP	G	A	Pts	PIM	GP	G	A	Pts	PIM
1978–79	Windsor Spitfires	OMJHL	66	27	42	69	29	—	—	—	—	—
1979–80	Michigan State University	B10	38	16	28	44	28	—	—	—	—	—
1980–81	Michigan State University	B10	35	18	15	33	20	—	—	—	—	—
1981–82	Michigan State University	B10	41	34	31	65	37	—	—	—	—	—
1982–83	Michigan State University	B10	42	30	29	59	16	—	—	—	—	—
1983–84	Indianapolis Checkers	CHL	71	22	32	54	38	9	1	1	2	0
1984–85	Springfield Indians	AHL	75	29	34	63	29	4	0	1	1	0
1984–85	New York Islanders	NHL	2	0	0	0	0	—	—	—	—	—
1985–86	Springfield Indians	AHL	14	5	8	13	7	—	—	—	—	—
1985–86	New York Islanders	NHL	49	5	12	17	9	1	0	0	0	0
1986–87	Springfield Indians	AHL	59	25	31	56	8	—	—	—	—	—
1986–87	New York Islanders	NHL	2	0	1	1	0	—	—	—	—	—
AHL totals			148	59	73	132	44	4	0	1	1	0
NHL totals			53	5	13	18	9	1	0	0	0	0

== Awards and honors ==
Award	Year
All-CCHA Second team	1981-82
