= Dan Brennan =

Canadian ice hockey player (born 1962)

- Born: October 1, 1962 (age 62); Dawson Creek, British Columbia, Canada
- Height: 6 ft 3 in (191 cm)
- Weight: 210 lb (95 kg; 15 st 0 lb)
- Position: Left wing
- Shot: Left
- Played for: Los Angeles Kings
- NHL draft: 165th overall, 1981; Los Angeles Kings
- Playing career: 1984–1986

Daniel T. Brennan (born 1 October 1962) is a Canadian former professional National Hockey League player. He played eight games for the Los Angeles Kings during the 1983–84 and 1985–86 seasons, recording one assist and nine minutes in penalties. Brennan played college hockey at the University of North Dakota.

== Career statistics ==
=== Regular season and playoffs ===
			Regular season					Playoffs
Season	Team	League	GP	G	A	Pts	PIM	GP	G	A	Pts	PIM
1979–80	Dawson Creek Canucks	PCJHL	—	—	—	—	—	—	—	—	—	—
1980–81	University of North Dakota	WCHA	37	3	9	12	66	—	—	—	—	—
1981–82	University of North Dakota	WCHA	42	10	17	27	78	—	—	—	—	—
1982–83	University of North Dakota	WCHA	31	9	11	20	60	—	—	—	—	—
1983–84	University of North Dakota	WCHA	45	28	37	65	36	—	—	—	—	—
1983–84	Los Angeles Kings	NHL	2	0	0	0	0	—	—	—	—	—
1984–85	New Haven Nighthawks	AHL	80	25	33	58	56	—	—	—	—	—
1985–86	Los Angeles Kings	NHL	6	0	1	1	9	—	—	—	—	—
1985–86	New Haven Nighthawks	AHL	62	8	22	30	76	2	0	0	0	10
1986–87	Nittorps IK	SWE-3	38	45	34	79	—	—	—	—	—	—
1987–88	Nittorps IK	SWE-3	35	36	37	73	—	—	—	—	—	—
1988–89	Nittorps IK	SWE-3	27	24	19	43	—	—	—	—	—	—
AHL totals			142	33	55	88	132	2	0	0	0	0
NHL totals			8	0	1	1	9	—	—	—	—	—

== Awards and honours ==
Award	Year
All-WCHA First Team	1983–84
