= Darren Jensen =

Canadian ice hockey player (born 1960)

- Born: May 27, 1960 (age 66) Creston, British Columbia, Canada
- Height: 5 ft 9 in (175 cm)
- Weight: 165 lb (75 kg; 11 st 11 lb)
- Position: Goaltender
- Caught: Left
- Played for: Philadelphia Flyers
- NHL draft: 106th overall, 1980; Hartford Whalers
- Playing career: 1983–1989

Darren Aksel Jensen (born May 27, 1960) is a Canadian former professional ice hockey goaltender who played two seasons in the National Hockey League (NHL) for the Philadelphia Flyers.

== Playing career ==
Jensen was a college goaltender with the Fighting Sioux at University of North Dakota, and won the NCAA Tournament with them in 1980 and 1982.

Jensen was selected by the Hartford Whalers in the fifth round of the 1980 NHL Entry Draft. However, he did not sign with Hartford and became a free agent, signing with the Flyers in 1985. He made his debut in the 1984–85 season, but lost the only game he played, and was sent to the Hershey Bears of the American Hockey League (AHL) for the remainder of the season.

After Pelle Lindbergh's death in 1985, Jensen was called up from Hershey to become the backup for newly promoted starting goalie, Bob Froese, winning his first game of the season against the Edmonton Oilers. Froese and Jensen were co-winners of the 1986 William M. Jennings Trophy for allowing the fewest goals in the NHL that season. After the Flyers obtained Chico Resch, Jensen was sent back to the minor leagues near the trading deadline, and finished his career with Hershey, the Fredericton Express and Milwaukee Admirals.

== Post-NHL ==
After his retirement, Jensen pursued a number of business ventures in his native British Columbia. He also served as a hockey coach in the area, including a stint as an assistant coach for the Summerland Steam of the Kootenay International Junior Hockey League, Goalie coach and Assistant Coach for the Kelowna Rockets of the WHL. Darren and his wife Michelle reside in Kelowna, BC.

== Awards and honors ==
Award	Year
All-NCAA All-Tournament Team	1982
James Norris Memorial Trophy	1984
IHL Rookie of the Year	1984
IHL Most Valuable Player	1984
William M. Jennings Trophy	1986

== Career statistics ==
=== Regular season and playoffs ===
			Regular season									Playoffs
Season	Team	League	GP	W	L	T	MIN	GA	SO	GAA	SV%	GP	W	L	MIN	GA	SO	GAA	SV%
1977–78	Penticton Vees	BCJHL	29	22	7	0	1732	133	0	4.61	—	—	—	—	—	—	—	—	—
1978–79	Penticton Vees	BCJHL	42	16	21	1	2475	187	0	4.53	—	—	—	—	—	—	—	—	—
1979–80	University of North Dakota	WCHA	15	—	—	—	890	33	1	2.21	—	—	—	—	—	—	—	—	—
1980–81	University of North Dakota	WCHA	25	—	—	—	1510	110	0	4.37	—	—	—	—	—	—	—	—	—
1981–82	University of North Dakota	WCHA	16	—	—	—	910	45	1	2.97	—	—	—	—	—	—	—	—	—
1982–83	University of North Dakota	WCHA	16	—	—	—	905	45	0	2.98	—	—	—	—	—	—	—	—	—
1983–84	Fort Wayne Komets	IHL	56	40	12	3	3325	162	4	2.92	—	6	2	4	358	21	0	3.52	—
1984–85	Philadelphia Flyers	NHL	1	0	1	0	60	7	0	7.00	.767	—	—	—	—	—	—	—	—
1984–85	Hershey Bears	AHL	39	12	20	6	2263	150	1	3.98	.884	—	—	—	—	—	—	—	—
1985–86	Philadelphia Flyers	NHL	29	15	9	1	1436	88	2	3.68	.884	—	—	—	—	—	—	—	—
1985–86	Hershey Bears	AHL	14	11	1	1	795	38	1	2.87	.902	7	5	1	365	19	0	3.12	—
1986–87	Hershey Bears	AHL	60	26	26	0	3429	215	0	3.76	.888	4	1	2	203	15	0	4.43	—
1987–88	Fredericton Express	AHL	42	18	19	4	2459	158	0	3.86	.885	12	7	5	715	40	0	3.36	—
1988–89	Milwaukee Admirals	IHL	11	7	2	0	555	36	0	3.89	—	—	—	—	—	—	—	—	—
NHL totals			30	15	10	1	1496	95	2	3.81	.879	—	—	—	—	—	—	—	—
AHL totals			155	67	66	11	8946	561	2	3.76	.887	23	13	8	1283	74	0	3.46	—

"Jensen's stats". The Goaltender Home Page.
