= Terry Kleisinger =

Canadian ice hockey player

- Born: October 22, 1960 (age 65) Regina, Saskatchewan, Canada
- Height: 6 ft 1 in (185 cm)
- Weight: 190 lb (86 kg; 13 st 8 lb)
- Position: Goaltender
- Caught: Right
- Played for: New York Rangers
- NHL draft: Undrafted
- Playing career: 1985–1987

Terry Kleisinger (born October 22, 1960) is a Canadian former professional ice hockey goaltender. He played four games in the National Hockey League (NHL) with the New York Rangers during the 1985–86 season, and a further 35 games in the minor leagues. Prior to turning professional Kleisinger played four seasons with the University of Wisconsin.

== Career statistics ==
=== Regular season and playoffs ===
			Regular season									Playoffs
Season	Team	League	GP	W	L	T	MIN	GA	SO	GAA	SV%	GP	W	L	MIN	GA	SO	GAA	SV%
1979–80	Nanaimo Clippers	BCJHL	49	—	—	—	2588	200	0	4.63	—	—	—	—	—	—	—	—	—
1980–81	University of Wisconsin	B1G	16	11	5	0	1011	61	2	3.62	.902	1	0	1	34	7	0	12.36	—
1981–82	University of Wisconsin	B1G	22	14	8	0	1337	59	4	2.65	.910	5	3	2	300	10	2	2.00	—
1982–83	University of Wisconsin	B1G	18	11	6	1	1021	48	3	2.82	.894	1	1	0	60	1	0	1.00	—
1983–84	University of Wisconsin	B1G	24	11	11	1	1406	96	0	4.10	.866	2	0	2	109	12	0	6.63	—
1985–86	New York Rangers	NHL	4	0	2	0	191	14	0	4.42	.872	—	—	—	—	—	—	—	—
1985–86	Flint Spirits	IHL	4	0	3	0	200	25	0	7.50	—	—	—	—	—	—	—	—	—
1985–86	Toledo Goaldiggers	IHL	14	1	10	0	786	76	0	5.80	—	—	—	—	—	—	—	—	—
1985–86	New Haven Nighthawks	AHL	10	2	5	2	497	34	0	4.10	.875	—	—	—	—	—	—	—	—
1986–87	New Haven Nighthawks	AHL	1	0	1	0	40	4	0	6.00	.790	—	—	—	—	—	—	—	—
1986–87	Flint Spirits	IHL	2	0	0	0	53	5	0	5.66	—	—	—	—	—	—	—	—	—
1986–87	Indianapolis Checkers	IHL	4	0	4	0	240	25	0	6.25	—	—	—	—	—	—	—	—	—
NHL totals			4	0	2	0	191	14	0	4.42	.872	—	—	—	—	—	—	—	—
