= Phil Sykes (ice hockey) =

Canadian ice hockey player

- Born: March 18, 1959 (age 66); Dawson Creek, British Columbia, Canada
- Height: 6 ft 0 in (183 cm)
- Weight: 175 lb (79 kg; 12 st 7 lb)
- Position: Left wing
- Shot: Left
- Played for: Los Angeles Kings; Winnipeg Jets
- National team: Canada
- NHL draft: Undrafted
- Playing career: 1982–1992

Phil Sykes (born March 18, 1959) is a Canadian former college and professional ice hockey winger.

== Career ==
He played college hockey for the University of North Dakota, helping them win NCAA national championships in 1980 and 1982. He was named to the NCAA Championship all-tournament team in 1980 and 1982 and the WCHA first all-star team in 1982. He was also named the NCAA's championship tournament MVP in 1982.

His National Hockey League playing career began with the Los Angeles Kings in the 1982–1983 season. He finished his career with the Winnipeg Jets following the 1991–1992 season. He played 456 games in the NHL and 212 games in the AHL during his 10-year professional career. Since retiring, Sykes has coached youth hockey in the Minneapolis–Saint Paul area.

== Career statistics ==
=== Regular season and playoffs ===
			Regular season					Playoffs
Season	Team	League	GP	G	A	Pts	PIM	GP	G	A	Pts	PIM
1976–77	Spruce Grove Mets	AJHL	—	—	—	—	—	—	—	—	—	—
1978–79	University of North Dakota	WCHA	41	9	5	14	16	—	—	—	—	—
1979–80	University of North Dakota	WCHA	37	22	27	49	34	—	—	—	—	—
1980–81	University of North Dakota	WCHA	38	28	34	62	22	—	—	—	—	—
1981–82	University of North Dakota	WCHA	45	39	24	63	20	—	—	—	—	—
1982–83	Los Angeles Kings	NHL	7	2	0	2	2	—	—	—	—	—
1982–83	New Haven Nighthawks	AHL	71	19	26	45	111	12	2	2	4	21
1983–84	Los Angeles Kings	NHL	3	0	0	0	2	—	—	—	—	—
1983–84	New Haven Nighthawks	AHL	77	29	37	66	101	—	—	—	—	—
1984–85	Los Angeles Kings	NHL	79	17	15	32	38	3	0	1	1	4
1985–86	Los Angeles Kings	NHL	76	20	24	44	97	—	—	—	—	—
1986–87	Los Angeles Kings	NHL	58	6	15	21	133	5	0	1	1	8
1987–88	Los Angeles Kings	NHL	40	9	12	21	82	4	0	0	0	0
1988–89	Los Angeles Kings	NHL	23	0	1	1	8	3	0	0	0	8
1988–89	New Haven Nighthawks	AHL	34	9	17	26	23	—	—	—	—	—
1989–90	Winnipeg Jets	NHL	48	9	6	15	32	—	—	—	—	—
1989–90	New Haven Nighthawks	AHL	25	3	12	15	32	—	—	—	—	—
1989–90	Moncton Hawks	AHL	5	0	1	1	20	—	—	—	—	—
1990–91	Winnipeg Jets	NHL	70	12	10	22	59	—	—	—	—	—
1991–92	Winnipeg Jets	NHL	52	4	2	6	72	7	0	1	1	9
NHL totals			456	79	85	164	519	26	0	3	3	29

=== International ===
Year	Team	Event	GP	G	A	Pts	PIM
1986	Canada	WC	9	0	0	0	4
Senior totals			9	0	0	0	4

== Awards and honours ==
Award	Year
All-NCAA All-Tournament Team	1980, 1982
All-WCHA First Team	1981–82

Awards and achievements
Preceded by Steve Ulseth	WCHA Most Valuable Player; 1981–82	Succeeded by Bob Mason
Preceded by Marc Behrend	NCAA Tournament Most Outstanding Player; 1982	Succeeded by Marc Behrend
