= James Patrick (ice hockey) =

Canadian ice hockey player and coach

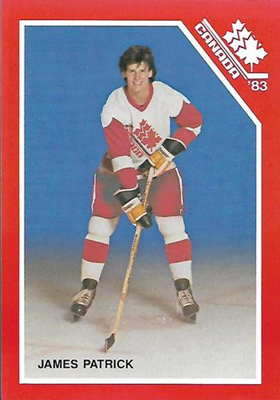
- Patrick in 1983 for Canadian junior team
- Born: June 14, 1963 (age 63) Winnipeg, Manitoba, Canada
- Height: 6 ft 2 in (188 cm)
- Weight: 200 lb (91 kg; 14 st 4 lb)
- Position: Defence
- Shot: Right
- Played for: New York Rangers; Hartford Whalers; Calgary Flames; Buffalo Sabres
- National team: Canada
- NHL draft: 9th overall, 1981; New York Rangers
- Playing career: 1983–2006
Medal record
Representing Canada
Ice hockey
World Championships
| Bronze medal – third place | 1983 West Germany |
| Silver medal – second place | 1989 Sweden |
Canada Cup
| Gold medal – first place | 1987 Canada |

James Patrick (born June 14, 1963) is a Canadian professional ice hockey coach and former player. He is currently the head coach for the Victoria Royals of the Western Hockey League (WHL).

== Playing career ==
After a successful collegiate career at the University of North Dakota, Patrick represented Canada at the 1984 Winter Olympics in Sarajevo, Yugoslavia. After the Olympics, Patrick signed his first professional contract on March 5, 1984 with the New York Rangers, and made his NHL debut two days later in Minnesota. Patrick scored his first NHL goal on March 17, 1984, in Philadelphia. Patrick enjoyed ten productive seasons in New York before being traded to the Hartford Whalers and then to the Calgary Flames during the 1993–94 season.

After several years in Calgary, Patrick signed with the Buffalo Sabres as a free agent after the 1997–98 season. Though he was chosen to play in the 1987 Canada Cup and many other international events, Patrick was never selected to the NHL All Star game. He ranks high among defencemen in both all times game played (1280) and total points (639). Patrick set a record (since broken) for career games played by a Team Canada player with 40 career games, breaking the previous record of 37 games in 2002. On September 8, 2005, Patrick announced his retirement from the NHL at the age of 42. He was immediately named to the Sabres' staff as a skill development coach. However, he left the team before the season to play in Germany's Deutsche Eishockey Liga with the Frankfurt Lions.

== Coaching career ==
Patrick joined the Buffalo Sabres as assistant coach in 2006. He made his debut as head coach in February 2012, when Lindy Ruff was incapable of coaching due to an injury. After Ruff was fired in February 2013, Patrick remained with the Sabres' coaching staff until the end of the season, and then was let go.

After the 2013 season he re-joined Ruff as an assistant coach with the Dallas Stars. At the end of the 2016–17 regular season, Patrick was let go when the Stars elected not to renew Ruff's expiring contract, after the team missed the playoffs.

On June 6, 2017, it was announced that Patrick was named as the head coach for the Kootenay Ice of the Western Hockey League (WHL).

On November 6, 2023, Patrick was named the next head coach of the Victoria Royals, following the dismissal of Dan Price.

== Personal life ==
Patrick is half Ukrainian and half English. His father, Stephen (born as Stepan Patrebka), was the child of Ukrainian immigrants from the Lviv region, and played for the Winnipeg Blue Bombers of the Canadian Football League. Patrick is the brother of Steve and the uncle of former player Nolan Patrick.

In 2014, Patrick was charged with assault stemming from a domestic incident, while working as an assistant coach for the Dallas Stars.

== Career statistics ==
=== Regular season and playoffs ===
| | | | Regular season | | | | | Playoffs |
| Season | Team | League | GP | G | A | Pts | PIM | GP | G | A | Pts | PIM |
|---|---|---|---|---|---|---|---|---|---|---|---|---|
| 1979–80 | Notre Dame Hounds | SMHL | — | — | — | — | — | — | — | — | — | — |
| 1980–81 | Prince Albert Raiders | SJHL | 59 | 21 | 61 | 82 | 162 | — | — | — | — | — |
| 1981–82 | University of North Dakota | WCHA | 42 | 5 | 24 | 29 | 26 | — | — | — | — | — |
| 1982–83 | University of North Dakota | WCHA | 36 | 12 | 36 | 48 | 29 | — | — | — | — | — |
| 1983–84 | Canadian National Team | Intl | 63 | 7 | 24 | 31 | 52 | — | — | — | — | — |
| 1983–84 | New York Rangers | NHL | 12 | 1 | 7 | 8 | 2 | 5 | 0 | 3 | 3 | 2 |
| 1984–85 | New York Rangers | NHL | 75 | 8 | 28 | 36 | 71 | 3 | 0 | 0 | 0 | 4 |
| 1985–86 | New York Rangers | NHL | 75 | 14 | 29 | 43 | 88 | 16 | 1 | 5 | 6 | 34 |
| 1986–87 | New York Rangers | NHL | 78 | 10 | 45 | 55 | 62 | 6 | 1 | 2 | 3 | 2 |
| 1987–88 | New York Rangers | NHL | 70 | 17 | 45 | 62 | 52 | — | — | — | — | — |
| 1988–89 | New York Rangers | NHL | 68 | 11 | 36 | 47 | 41 | 4 | 0 | 1 | 1 | 2 |
| 1989–90 | New York Rangers | NHL | 73 | 14 | 43 | 57 | 50 | 10 | 3 | 8 | 11 | 0 |
| 1990–91 | New York Rangers | NHL | 74 | 10 | 49 | 59 | 58 | 6 | 0 | 0 | 0 | 6 |
| 1991–92 | New York Rangers | NHL | 80 | 14 | 57 | 71 | 54 | 13 | 0 | 7 | 7 | 12 |
| 1992–93 | New York Rangers | NHL | 60 | 5 | 21 | 26 | 61 | — | — | — | — | — |
| 1993–94 | New York Rangers | NHL | 6 | 0 | 3 | 3 | 2 | — | — | — | — | — |
| 1993–94 | Hartford Whalers | NHL | 47 | 8 | 20 | 28 | 32 | — | — | — | — | — |
| 1993–94 | Calgary Flames | NHL | 15 | 2 | 2 | 4 | 6 | 7 | 0 | 1 | 1 | 6 |
| 1994–95 | Calgary Flames | NHL | 43 | 0 | 10 | 10 | 14 | 5 | 0 | 1 | 1 | 0 |
| 1995–96 | Calgary Flames | NHL | 80 | 3 | 32 | 35 | 30 | 4 | 0 | 0 | 0 | 2 |
| 1996–97 | Calgary Flames | NHL | 19 | 3 | 1 | 4 | 6 | — | — | — | — | — |
| 1997–98 | Calgary Flames | NHL | 60 | 6 | 11 | 17 | 26 | — | — | — | — | — |
| 1998–99 | Buffalo Sabres | NHL | 45 | 1 | 7 | 8 | 16 | 20 | 0 | 1 | 1 | 12 |
| 1999–00 | Buffalo Sabres | NHL | 66 | 5 | 8 | 13 | 22 | 5 | 0 | 1 | 1 | 2 |
| 2000–01 | Buffalo Sabres | NHL | 54 | 4 | 9 | 13 | 12 | 13 | 1 | 2 | 3 | 2 |
| 2001–02 | Buffalo Sabres | NHL | 56 | 5 | 8 | 13 | 16 | — | — | — | — | — |
| 2002–03 | Buffalo Sabres | NHL | 69 | 4 | 12 | 16 | 26 | — | — | — | — | — |
| 2003–04 | Buffalo Sabres | NHL | 55 | 4 | 7 | 11 | 12 | — | — | — | — | — |
| 2005–06 | Frankfurt Lions | DEL | 42 | 1 | 6 | 7 | 73 | — | — | — | — | — |
| NHL totals | | | 1,280 | 149 | 490 | 639 | 759 | 117 | 6 | 32 | 38 | 86 |

=== International ===
| Year | Team | Event | GP | G | A | Pts | PIM |
|---|---|---|---|---|---|---|---|
| 1982 | Canada | WJC | 7 | 0 | 2 | 2 | 6 |
| 1983 | Canada | WJC | 7 | 0 | 2 | 2 | 4 |
| 1983 | Canada | WC | 9 | 1 | 1 | 2 | 10 |
| 1984 | Canada | OLY | 7 | 0 | 3 | 3 | 4 |
| 1987 | Canada | WC | 8 | 0 | 1 | 1 | 2 |
| 1987 | Canada | CC | 6 | 0 | 1 | 1 | 2 |
| 1989 | Canada | WC | 10 | 2 | 2 | 4 | 8 |
| 1998 | Canada | WC | 6 | 0 | 1 | 1 | 0 |
| 2002 | Canada | WC | 7 | 0 | 2 | 2 | 0 |
| Junior totals | | | 14 | 0 | 4 | 4 | 10 |
| Senior totals | | | 53 | 3 | 11 | 14 | 26 |

=== Coaching record ===
| Team | Year | Regular season | | | | | | | Postseason |
| Team | Year | G | W | L | OTL | SL | Pts | Finish | Result |
|---|---|---|---|---|---|---|---|---|---|
| KOO | 2017–18 | 72 | 27 | 38 | 5 | 2 | 61 | 4th in Central | Missed playoffs |
| KOO | 2018–19 | 68 | 13 | 45 | 7 | 3 | 36 | 5th in Central | Missed playoffs |
| WPG | 2019–20 | 63 | 38 | 24 | 1 | 0 | 77 | 2nd in East | Playoffs cancelled due to COVID-19 pandemic |
| WPG | 2020–21 | 24 | 18 | 5 | 1 | 0 | 37 | no standings (Note: The 2020–21 season was shortened, started late, then was cancelled early, and no playoffs were held, due to the ongoing COVID-19 pandemic. The Winnipeg Ice were in a mathematical position to finish anywhere from 2nd to 4th in the East Division when the season was cancelled.) | no playoffs |
| WPG | 2021–22 | 68 | 53 | 10 | 3 | 2 | 111 | 1st in East | Lost in East Final |
| WPG | 2022–23 | 68 | 57 | 10 | 1 | 0 | 115 | 1st in East | Lost in WHL Final |
| KOO/WPG totals | | 363 | 206 | 132 | 18 | 7 | 437 | | |
| VIC | 2023–24 | 68 | 29 | 30 | 5 | 4 | 67 | 4th in B.C. | Lost in first round |
| VIC | 2024–25 | 68 | 40 | 17 | 4 | 7 | 91 | 1st in B.C. | Lost in second round |
| VIC totals | | 136 | 69 | 47 | 9 | 11 | 158 | | |
| WHL totals | | 499 | 275 | 179 | 27 | 18 | 595 | | |

== Awards and honours ==
| Award | Year |
|---|---|
| All-WCHA Second Team | 1981–82 |
| All-NCAA All-Tournament Team | 1982 |
| All-WCHA First Team | 1982–83 |
| AHCA West All-American | 1982–83 |

- Canadian Tier II Player of Year (1981)
- SJHL All-Star First Team (1981)
- SJHL Championship (1981)
- Centennial Cup First Team All-Star (1981)
- Centennial Cup Championship (1981)
- WCHA Freshman of the Year (1982)
- NCAA Championship (1982)
- Played in the World Junior Championships for Team Canada (1983)
- Played in the World Championships for Team Canada (1983, 1987, 1989, 1998, & 2002)
- Played in the Sarajevo Olympics for Team Canada (1984)
- Played in the Canada Cup Tournament for Team Canada (1987)
- Honoured Member of the Manitoba Hockey Hall of Fame
- Member of the Manitoba Sports Hall of Fame (2008)
- In the 2009 book 100 Ranger Greats, was ranked No. 44 all-time of the 901 New York Rangers who had played during the team's first 82 seasons

== See also ==
- List of NHL players with 1,000 games played

== Notes ==
Awards and achievements
| Preceded by Ron Scott | WCHA Freshman of the Year; 1981–82 | Succeeded by Craig Redmond |
Sporting positions
| Preceded by Jim Malone | New York Rangers first-round draft pick 1981 | Succeeded by Chris Kontos |
| Preceded by Chris Drury | Buffalo Sabres captain December 2003 | Succeeded by Jean-Pierre Dumont |
