= 1981–82 NCAA Division I men's ice hockey season =

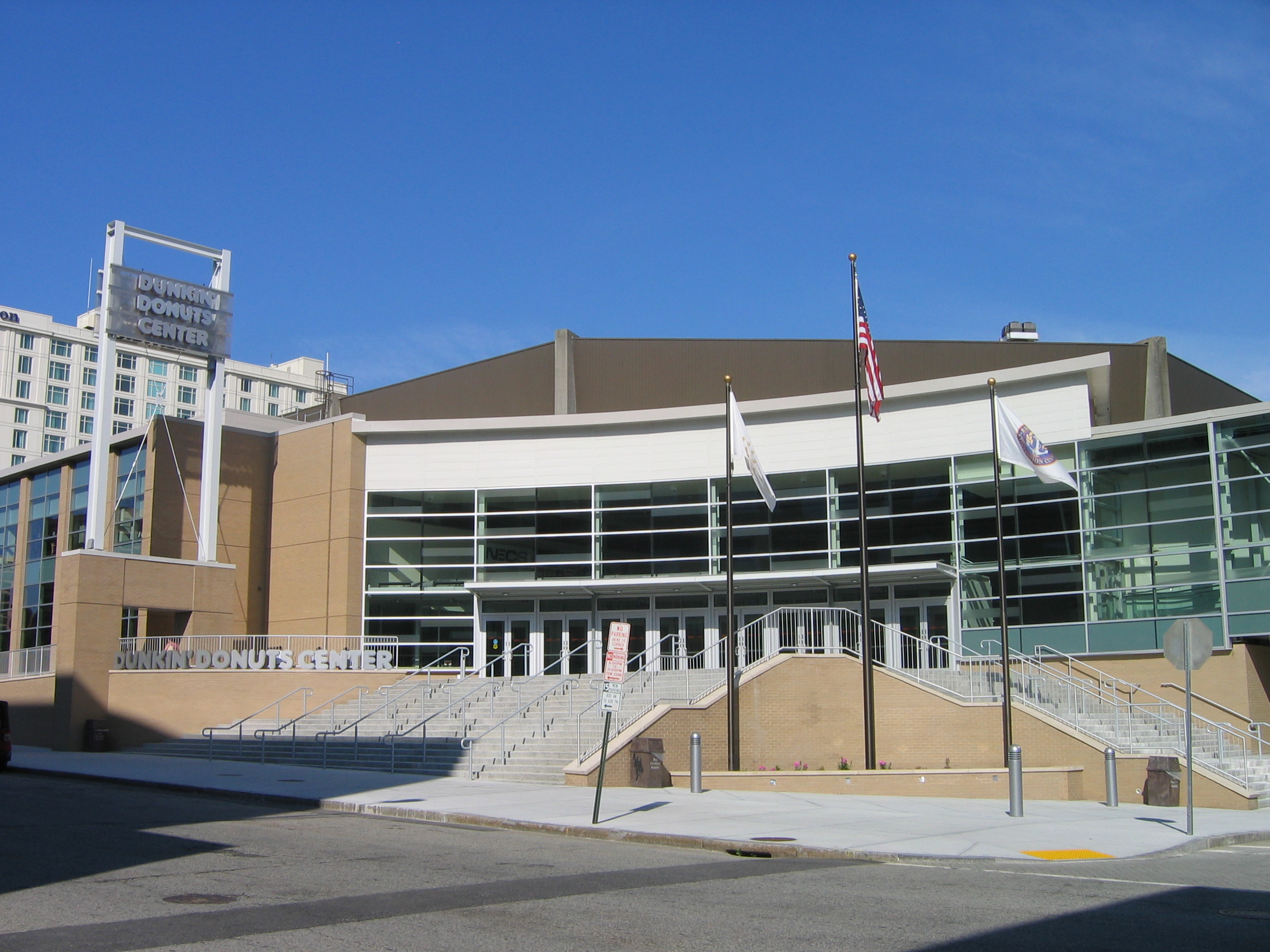
- The Providence Civic Center served as the host for the 1982 Frozen Four
- Duration: October 1981– March 27, 1982
- NCAA tournament: 1982
- National championship: Providence Civic Center; Providence, Rhode Island
- NCAA champion: North Dakota
- Hobey Baker Award: George McPhee (Bowling Green)

The 1981–82 NCAA Division I men's ice hockey season began in October 1981 and concluded with the 1982 NCAA Division I Men's Ice Hockey Tournament's championship game on March 27, 1982 at the Providence Civic Center in Providence, Rhode Island. This was the 35th season in which an NCAA ice hockey championship was held and is the 88th year overall where an NCAA school fielded a team.

== Season Outlook ==
=== Pre-season poll ===
The top teams in the nation voted on by coaches before the start of the season. The poll was compiled by radio station WMPL.

WMPL Poll
Rank	Team
1	Wisconsin
2	Minnesota
3	North Dakota
4	Michigan
5	Providence
6	Minnesota Duluth
7	Northern Michigan
8	Denver
9	Clarkson
10	Notre Dame

== Regular season ==
=== Season tournaments ===
Tournament	Dates	Teams	Champion
Empire Cup	November 13–14	4	Clarkson
North Country Thanksgiving Festival	November 26–28	3	Clarkson
Great Lakes Invitational	December 29–30	4	Notre Dame
I Love New York Tournament	December 29–30	4	Clarkson
Rensselaer Holiday Tournament	December 29–30	4	St. Lawrence
Auld Lang Syne Classic	December 30–31	4	Dartmouth
Jeno Holiday Tournament	December 31–January 2	4	Lake Superior State
Beanpot	February 1, 8	4	Boston University

=== Standings ===
1981–82 Central Collegiate Hockey Association standings
	Conference							Overall					
	GP	W	L	T	PTS	GF	GA	GP	W	L	T	GF	GA
Bowling Green†	28	20	7	1	41	164	105	42	27	13	2	235	163
Michigan State*	32	21	10	1	43	138	94	42	26	14	2	184	123
Michigan Tech	28	16	11	1	33	129	120	40	23	14	3	195	165
Notre Dame	30	15	13	2	32	139	130	40	23	15	2	199	168
Michigan	30	14	12	4	32	93	101	38	18	15	5	130	131
Ferris State	30	13	15	2	28	117	133	36	15	18	3	144	158
Lake Superior State	28	11	15	2	24	112	110	39	19	17	3	165	150
Northern Michigan	28	12	16	0	24	106	127	36	15	21	0	141	171
Western Michigan	30	11	18	1	23	129	150	34	14	19	1	141	164
Ohio State	28	10	17	1	21	107	132	34	16	17	1	158	150
Miami	28	9	18	1	19	100	132	36	16	19	1	163	153
Championship: Michigan State † indicates conference regular season champion * indicates conference tournament champion

1981–82 ECAC Hockey standings
	Conference							Overall					
	GP	W	L	T	Pct.	GF	GA	GP	W	L	T	GF	GA
East Region
Northeastern*	21	14	6	1	.690	125	89	36	25	9	2	212	140
New Hampshire	22	15	7	0	.682	116	91	36	22	14	0	176	159
Boston College	21	13	8	0	.619	85	79	30	19	11	0	131	105
Providence	21	13	8	0	.619	119	80	33	20	12	1	162	114
Boston University	22	9	10	3	.477	102	91	28	14	11	3	133	102
Maine	21	3	18	0	.143	67	155	29	8	21	0	113	189
West Region
Clarkson†	20	15	4	1	.775	106	63	35	26	8	1	185	108
St. Lawrence	21	12	8	1	.595	88	74	31	19	11	1	152	116
Colgate	20	11	8	1	.575	96	77	30	19	10	1	177	109
Vermont	22	8	12	2	.409	95	115	29	11	16	2	133	153
Rensselaer	20	6	12	2	.350	76	96	29	9	18	2	110	135
Ivy Region
Harvard	21	11	8	2	.571	106	85	30	13	15	2	126	109
Yale	21	11	9	1	.548	77	76	26	15	10	1	113	93
Cornell	22	10	11	1	.477	92	80	26	12	13	1	107	91
Princeton	21	7	12	2	.381	81	103	26	9	14	3	105	124
Dartmouth	21	6	14	1	.310	85	119	26	10	15	1	113	140
Brown	21	6	15	0	.286	75	121	26	8	18	0	100	155
Independent
Army^	-	-	-	-	-	-	-	36	25	11	0	260	171
Championship: Northeastern † indicates conference regular season champion * indicates conference tournament champion^ Army had been accepted into ECAC Hockey but had not begun a conference schedule

1981–82 NCAA Division I Independent ice hockey standings
	Conference							Overall					
	GP	W	L	T	PTS	GF	GA	GP	W	L	T	GF	GA
Air Force	0	0	0	0	-	-	-	28	12	15	1	142	170
Illinois-Chicago	0	0	0	0	-	-	-	31	7	24	0		
Kent State	0	0	0	0	-	-	-	29	12	17	0		
Northern Arizona	0	0	0	0	-	-	-	24	6	18	0	94	148
US International	0	0	0	0	-	-	-	30	18	12	0		

1981–82 Western Collegiate Hockey Association standings
	Conference							Overall					
	GP	W	L	T	PTS	GF	GA	GP	W	L	T	GF	GA
North Dakota†	26	19	7	0	38	119	81	47	35	12	0	218	143
Wisconsin*	26	18	7	1	37	126	80	47	35	11	1	255	126
Minnesota	26	13	11	2	28	103	102	36	22	12	2	153	125
Denver	26	9	15	2	20	119	132	43	21	19	3	233	197
Minnesota-Duluth	26	9	16	1	19	114	141	40	16	21	3	192	201
Colorado College	26	6	18	2	14	105	150	36	11	23	2	152	196
Championship: Wisconsin † indicates conference regular season champion * indicates conference tournament champion

=== Final regular season polls ===
The final top 10 teams as ranked by coaches (WMPL) before the conference tournament finals.

WMPL Coaches Poll
Ranking	Team
1	North Dakota
2	Clarkson
3	Wisconsin
4	Bowling Green State
5	Michigan State
6	New Hampshire
7	Michigan Tech
8	Minnesota
9	Northeastern
10	Denver

== 1982 NCAA Tournament ==
Quarterfinals; March 19–21
E1	Northeastern	2	3***	5
W4	Bowling Green	2	2	4
W2	North Dakota	5	2	7
E3	Clarkson	1	1	2
W1	Wisconsin	6	4	10
E4	Harvard	1	3	4
E2	New Hampshire	3	6	9
W3	Michigan State	2	2	4

Semifinals; March 25–26
E1	Northeastern	2
W2	North Dakota	6
W1	Wisconsin	5
E2	New Hampshire	0

National championship March 27
W2	North Dakota	5
W1	Wisconsin	2
Third-place game
E1	Northeastern	10
E2	New Hampshire	4

Note: * denotes overtime period(s)

== Player stats ==
=== Scoring leaders ===
The following players led the league in points at the conclusion of the season.

GP = Games played; G = Goals; A = Assists; Pts = Points; PIM = Penalty minutes

Player	Class	Team	GP	G	A	Pts	PIM
Ed Beers	Senior	Denver	42	50	34	84	59
Donald Fraser	Junior	Denver	43	26	57	83	40
Brian Hills	Junior	Bowling Green	41	34	47	81	41
George McPhee	Senior	Bowling Green	40	28	52	80	57
Ed Collazzo	Sophomore	Army	34	37	37	74	23
Scott Carlton	Senior	Minnesota−Duluth	40	30	44	74	23
Newell Brown	Sophomore	Michigan State	42	22	51	73	66
Jim Knowlton	Junior	Army	32	26	41	67	47
Mark Hamway	Junior	Michigan State	41	34	31	65	37
Gregg Moore	Junior	Minnesota−Duluth	40	31	34	65	10
John Newberry	Sophomore	Wisconsin	39	28	27	65	42

=== Leading goaltenders ===
The following goaltenders led the league in goals against average at the end of the regular season while playing at least 33% of their team's total minutes.

GP = Games played; Min = Minutes played; W = Wins; L = Losses; OT = Overtime/shootout losses; GA = Goals against; SO = Shutouts; SV% = Save percentage; GAA = Goals against average

Player	Class	Team	GP	Min	W	L	OT	GA	SO	SV%	GAA
Marc Behrend	Junior	Wisconsin	25	1502	21	3	1	65	2	.908	2.60
Terry Kleisinger	Sophomore	Wisconsin	22	1337	14	8	0	59	4	.910	2.65
Jon Casey	Sophomore	North Dakota	18	1038	15	3	0	48	1	.908	2.77
Ron Scott	Sophomore	Michigan State	39	2298	24	13	1	109	2	.901	2.85
Don Sylvestri	Sophomore	Clarkson	30	1782	22	6	1	87	2	.881	2.93
Darren Jensen	Junior	North Dakota	16	910	10	6	0	45	0	.892	2.96
Bill Switaj	Junior	Boston College	12	-	-	-	-	-	1	.890	2.97
James Jetland	Senior	Minnesota	12	636	7	4	1	32	0	.899	3.02
Peter Mason	Senior	Michigan	16	714	8	4	1	36	1	.928	3.03
Brian Hayward	Senior	Cornell	22	1249	11	10	1	66	0	.915	3.17
Gray Weicker	Junior	St. Lawrence	20	1134	12	4	1	60	1	.903	3.17

== Awards ==
=== NCAA ===
Award		Recipient
Hobey Baker Memorial Award		George McPhee, Bowling Green
Spencer Penrose Award		Fernie Flaman, Northeastern
Most Outstanding Player in NCAA Tournament		Phil Sykes, North Dakota
AHCA All-American Teams
East Team	Position	West Team
Brian Hayward, Cornell	G	Ron Scott, Michigan State
Mark Fusco, Harvard	D	Bruce Driver, Wisconsin
Chris Renaud, Colgate	D	Brian MacLellan, Bowling Green
Andy Brickley, New Hampshire	F	Brian Hills, Bowling Green
Steve Cruickshank, Clarkson	F	George McPhee, Bowling Green
Kirk McCaskill, Vermont	F	John Newberry, Wisconsin

=== CCHA ===
Awards		Recipient
Player of the Year		George McPhee, Bowling Green
Rookie of the Year		Jon Elliot, Michigan
Coach of the Year		Jerry York, Bowling Green
Most Valuable Player in Tournament		Ron Scott, Michigan State
All-CCHA Teams
First Team	Position	Second Team
Ron Scott, Michigan State	G	Jon Elliot, Michigan
Brian MacLellan, Bowling Green	D	Steve Richmond, Michigan
Jim File, Ferris State	D	Gary Haight, Michigan State
	D	John Schmidt, Notre Dame
George McPhee, Bowling Green	F	Dave Poulin, Notre Dame
Brian Hills, Bowling Green	F	Mark Hamway, Michigan State
Newell Brown, Michigan State	F	Larry Marson, Ohio State

=== ECAC ===
Award		Recipient
Player of the Year		Steve Cruickshank, Clarkson
Rookie of the Year		Normand Lacombe, New Hampshire
Most Outstanding Player in Tournament		Mark Davidner, Northeastern
All-ECAC Hockey Teams
First Team	Position	Second Team
Brian Hayward, Cornell	G	Bob O'Connor, Boston College
Chris Renaud, Colgate	D	Randy Velischek, Providence
Scott Kleinendorst, Providence	D	Mark Fusco, Harvard
Steve Cruickshank, Clarkson	F	Dan Poliziani, Yale
Kirk McCaskill, Vermont	F	Kurt Kleinendorst, Providence
Andy Brickley, New Hampshire	F	Billy O'Dwyer, Boston College

=== WCHA ===
Award		Recipient
Most Valuable Player		Phil Sykes, North Dakota
Freshman of the Year		James Patrick, North Dakota
Coach of the Year		Gino Gasparini, North Dakota
All-WCHA Teams
First Team	Position	Second Team
Jon Casey, North Dakota	G	Marc Behrend, Wisconsin
Doug Lidster, Colorado College	D	James Patrick, North Dakota
Bruce Driver, Wisconsin	D	Craig Ludwig, North Dakota
Ed Beers, Denver	F	Bryan Erickson, Minnesota
Phil Sykes, North Dakota	F	Gregg Moore, Minnesota-Duluth
John Newberry, Wisconsin	F	Troy Murray, North Dakota

== 1982 NHL entry draft ==
Round	Pick	Player	College	Conference	NHL team
1	21	Patrick Flatley	Wisconsin	WCHA	New York Islanders
2	26	Mike Anderson ^{†}	Minnesota	WCHA	Buffalo Sabres
2	29	Dave Reierson ^{†}	Michigan Tech	CCHA	Calgary Flames
2	32	Kent Carlson	St. Lawrence	ECAC Hockey	Montreal Canadiens
2	33	David Maley ^{†}	Wisconsin	WCHA	Montreal Canadiens
2	40	Scott Sandelin ^{†}	North Dakota	WCHA	Montreal Canadiens
3	51	Jim Laing	Clarkson	ECAC Hockey	Calgary Flames
3	56	Kevin Dineen	Denver	WCHA	Hartford Whalers
3	57	Corey Millen ^{†}	Minnesota	WCHA	New York Rangers
3	59	Wally Chapman ^{†}	Minnesota	WCHA	Minnesota North Stars
3	61	Scott Harlow ^{†}	Boston College	ECAC Hockey	Montreal Canadiens
4	69	John DeVoe ^{†}	Notre Dame	CCHA	Montreal Canadiens
4	70	Bill Watson ^{†}	Minnesota–Duluth	WCHA	Chicago Black Hawks
4	74	Tom Martin ^{†}	Denver	WCHA	Winnipeg Jets
4	75	Dave Ellett ^{†}	Bowling Green	CCHA	Winnipeg Jets
4	78	Chris Jensen ^{†}	North Dakota	WCHA	New York Rangers
4	79	Jeff Hamilton ^{†}	Providence	ECAC Hockey	Buffalo Sabres
5	91	Brad Beck ^{†}	Michigan State	CCHA	Chicago Black Hawks
5	96	Tim Mishler ^{†}	North Dakota	WCHA	Winnipeg Jets
5	100	Bob Logan ^{†}	Yale	ECAC Hockey	Buffalo Sabres
5	101	Marty Wiitala ^{†}	Wisconsin	WCHA	Minnesota North Stars
5	103	Kevin Houle	Boston College	ECAC Hockey	Montreal Canadiens
6	111	Jeff Parker ^{†}	Michigan State	CCHA	Buffalo Sabres
6	117	Ernie Vargas ^{†}	Wisconsin	WCHA	Montreal Canadiens
6	120	Tony Granato ^{†}	Wisconsin	WCHA	New York Rangers
6	122	Todd Carlile ^{†}	Michigan	CCHA	Minnesota North Stars
6	123	Bob Sweeney ^{†}	Boston College	ECAC Hockey	Boston Bruins
6	124	Mike Dark ^{†}	Rensselaer	ECAC Hockey	Montreal Canadiens
7	128	Greg Hudas ^{†}	Notre Dame	CCHA	Detroit Red Wings
7	129	Dominic Campedelli ^{†}	Boston College	ECAC Hockey	Montreal Canadiens
7	130	Jim Johannson ^{†}	Wisconsin	WCHA	Hartford Whalers
7	133	Jay Ness ^{†}	North Dakota	WCHA	Chicago Black Hawks
7	138	Derek Ray ^{†}	Clarkson	ECAC Hockey	Winnipeg Jets
7	147	John Tiano ^{†}	Boston University	ECAC Hockey	New York Islanders
8	150	Steve Smith	St. Lawrence	ECAC Hockey	Montreal Canadiens
8	151	Mickey Krampotich ^{†}	North Dakota	WCHA	Hartford Whalers
8	155	Chris Delaney	Boston College	ECAC Hockey	St. Louis Blues
8	158	Newell Brown	Michigan State	CCHA	Vancouver Canucks
8	159	Guy Gosselin ^{†}	Minnesota–Duluth	WCHA	Winnipeg Jets
8	160	Brian Glynn ^{†}	Minnesota–Duluth	WCHA	New York Rangers
8	164	Paul Miller ^{†}	Minnesota	WCHA	Minnesota North Stars
8	167	Dean Clark ^{†}	Ferris State	CCHA	Edmonton Oilers
8	168	Todd Okerlund ^{†}	Minnesota	WCHA	New York Islanders
9	170	Gary Cullen	Cornell	ECAC Hockey	Detroit Red Wings
9	176	Matt Christensen ^{†}	Minnesota–Duluth	WCHA	St. Louis Blues
9	177	Ted Pearson	Wisconsin	WCHA	Calgary Flames
9	180	Tom Ward ^{†}	Minnesota	WCHA	Winnipeg Jets
9	183	Kelly Miller	Michigan State	CCHA	New York Rangers
9	185	Pat Micheletti ^{†}	Minnesota	WCHA	Minnesota North Stars
9	187	Brian Williams ^{†}	North Dakota	WCHA	Montreal Canadiens
10	195	John Franzosa ^{†}	Brown	ECAC Hockey	Los Angeles Kings
10	197	John Shumski	Rensselaer	ECAC Hockey	St. Louis Blues
10	203	Tom Allen	Michigan Tech	CCHA	Philadelphia Flyers
10	204	Bob Lowes ^{†}	Michigan State	CCHA	New York Rangers
10	208	Bob Emery ^{†}	Boston College	ECAC Hockey	Montreal Canadiens
10	209	Grant Dion ^{†}	Denver	WCHA	Edmonton Oilers
10	210	Eric Faust ^{†}	Wisconsin	WCHA	New York Islanders
11	211	Scott Fusco	Harvard	ECAC Hockey	New Jersey Devils
11	213	Tim Loven ^{†}	North Dakota	WCHA	Toronto Maple Leafs
11	216	Ray Shero	St. Lawrence	ECAC Hockey	Los Angeles Kings
11	219	Richard Erdall	Minnesota	WCHA	Calgary Flames
11	222	Bob Shaw ^{†}	Northern Michigan	CCHA	Winnipeg Jets
11	225	Andy Otto ^{†}	Clarkson	ECAC Hockey	New York Rangers
11	226	Jim Plankers ^{†}	Minnesota–Duluth	WCHA	Buffalo Sabres
11	227	Scott Knutson ^{†}	Minnesota	WCHA	Minnesota North Stars
11	229	Darren Acheson ^{†}	Yale	ECAC Hockey	Montreal Canadiens
11	231	Pat Goff ^{†}	Michigan	CCHA	New York Islanders
12	232	Dan Dorion ^{†}	Western Michigan	CCHA	New Jersey Devils
12	239	Pete Smith	Maine	ECAC Hockey	St. Louis Blues
12	245	Mark Vichorek ^{†}	Lake Superior State	CCHA	Philadelphia Flyers
12	246	Dwayne Robinson	New Hampshire	ECAC Hockey	New York Rangers
12	249	Bruno Campese	Northern Michigan	CCHA	Boston Bruins
12	250	Bill Brauer ^{†}	Michigan	CCHA	Montreal Canadiens

† incoming freshman

== See also ==
- 1981–82 NCAA Division II men's ice hockey season
- 1981–82 NCAA Division III men's ice hockey season
