= Jim Johannson =

American ice hockey player and executive (1964–2018)

- Born: March 10, 1964; Rochester, Minnesota, US
- Died: January 21, 2018 (aged 53); Colorado Springs, Colorado, US
- Education: University of Wisconsin–Madison
- Occupation: Ice hockey executive
- Known for: USA Hockey administrator; General manager of the US men's national team and the US junior national team
- Father: Ken Johannson
- Family: John Johannson (brother)
- Awards: Lester Patrick Trophy (2018); Paul Loicq Award (2019)
Ice hockey career
- Height: 6 ft 2 in (188 cm)
- Weight: 201 lb (91 kg; 14 st 5 lb)
- Position: Center
- Shot: Right
- Played for: Salt Lake Golden Eagles; Indianapolis Ice; Milwaukee Admirals
- National team: United States
- NHL draft: 130th overall, 1982; Hartford Whalers
- Playing career: 1982–1994

James Johannson (March 10, 1964 – January 21, 2018) was an American ice hockey player, coach and executive. He played for the United States national junior team at the World Juniors in 1983 and 1984, then played for the United States national team at the Winter Olympics in 1988 and 1992, the Ice Hockey World Championships in 1992, and was captain of the silver medal-winning team at the 1990 Goodwill Games. He played 374 games in the International Hockey League (IHL) after being selected by the Hartford Whalers in the 1982 NHL entry draft. He won the Turner Cup as the IHL playoffs champion with the Salt Lake Golden Eagles in 1988, then again with the Indianapolis Ice in 1990. He played 264 consecutive games spanning three seasons by 1991, and received the Ironman Award from the IHL in recognition of his durability. As an amateur, he played for the Wisconsin Badgers men's ice hockey program and won the National Collegiate Athletic Association championship in 1983. Johannson was twice named to the Western Collegiate Hockey Association All-Academic team, and graduated from the University of Wisconsin–Madison with a degree in sport management.

After retiring as a player, Johannson was head coach and general manager of the Twin Cities Vulcans in the United States Hockey League, and led them to the Junior A National Championship in the 1999–2000 season. He worked in several executive positions for USA Hockey from 2000 to 2018, co-operated with the United States Olympic Committee, and oversaw all men's and women's national hockey teams. During his tenure with USA Hockey, national teams won a combined total of 64 medals in International Ice Hockey Federation (IIHF) competitions. He helped acquire Compuware Arena to become the home rink for the USA Hockey National Team Development Program, and was general manager of the men's national team at the 2018 Winter Olympics until his death three weeks before the games began. He was posthumously given the Lester Patrick Trophy in recognition of growing hockey in the United States, received the Paul Loicq Award from the IIHF for contributions to international ice hockey, and inducted into the University of Wisconsin Athletic Hall of Fame. He was son of Ken Johannson who also served as general manager of the United States national team, and was the younger brother of professional hockey player John Johannson.

== Early life and family ==
James Johannson was born on March 10, 1964, in Rochester, Minnesota, and was commonly known as "J.J." He was the youngest of two boys and one girl to Ken Johannson and Marietta Sands, which included his older brother John Johannson. During the 1970s, Johannson's father served as the coaching director of the Amateur Hockey Association of the United States, and was the general manager of the United States national team in 1979 and 1980. As a youth, Johannson and his brother spent summer vacations at hockey camps operated by their father, were included in photographs demonstrating skills for coaching manuals, were stick boys at selection camps for the US national team, and handed out shoes and jackets to the players.

== Playing career ==
=== Amateur ===
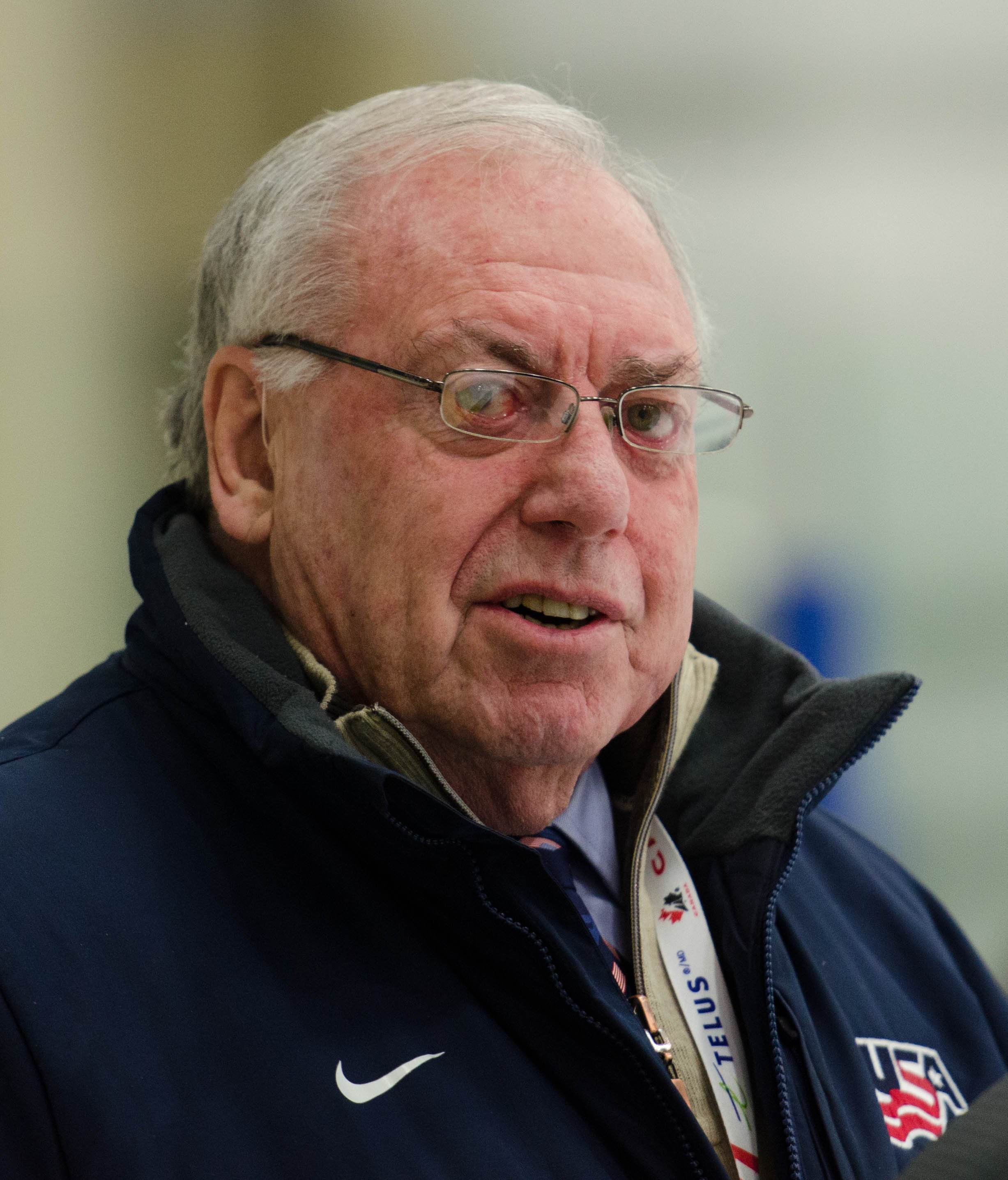
Jeff Sauer was Johannson's coach on the Wisconsin Badgers.

Johannson played ice hockey as a center, was a right-handed shooter, and was listed as 6 ft 2 in (188 cm) and 201 lb (91 kg). He played in the Minnesota state high school tournament with Mayo High School in 1982, and was tied as the tournament's leading scorer with seven points. He was recruited by family friend Bob Johnson to play for the Wisconsin Badgers men's ice hockey program along with his older brother John. Johannson signed a letter of intent in March 1982 to attend the University of Wisconsin–Madison, then was selected by the Hartford Whalers in the 1982 NHL entry draft, 130th overall in the seventh round.

From 1982 to 1986, Johannson played for the Badgers, and won a National Collegiate Athletic Association (NCAA) championship as a freshman in the 1982–83 season. He received the Fenton J. Kelsey Award as the most competitive player on the Badgers for the 1983–84 season, in which he scored 17 goals and 21 assists as a sophomore. As a junior, he was named to the Western Collegiate Hockey Association (WCHA) All-Academic team for the 1984–85 season. He was second in goal scoring for the Badgers during the 1985–86 season as a senior, when his collarbone was broken in a body check. He missed 12 games due to the injury, then completed his college career with 63 total goals in four seasons. He received the Wisconsin Williamson Award as a scholar athlete, and was again named to the WCHA All-Academic team. He graduated from Wisconsin with a degree in sport management, but was not offered a professional contract by the Hartford Whalers.

=== Professional ===
Johannson began his professional career playing in West Germany with EV Landsberg in the 2nd Bundesliga during the 1986–87 season. He scored 46 goals for EV Landsberg and felt that his skating improved while playing in Europe. He later recalled that he loved his time in Germany and stated, "I got so much ice time, it was great. We had nothing else to do. I had a key to the rink". He became an unrestricted free agent after the season, then trained for two hours daily during the summer with skating coach Jack Blatherwick to become faster.

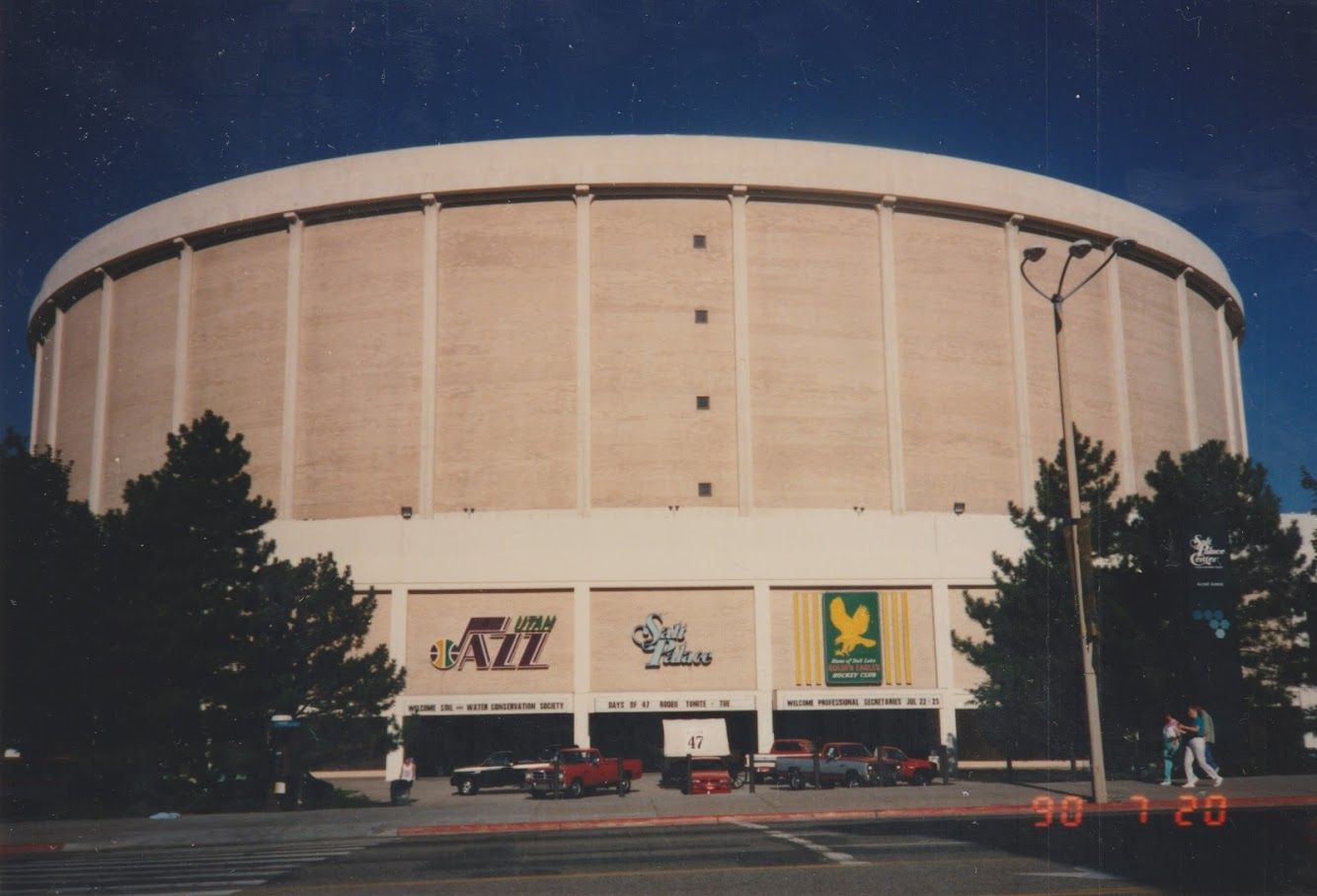
The Salt Palace was the home rink for the Salt Lake Golden Eagles.

The Calgary Flames signed Johannson on February 25, 1988, and assigned him to their minor league affiliate team, the Salt Lake Golden Eagles in the International Hockey League (IHL) for the remainder of the 1987–88 season. He scored five goals and two assists in his first eight games in the IHL. He led the league with 15 assists during the 1988 playoffs, and scored eight goals to help the Golden Eagles win the Turner Cup as the IHL playoffs champions in 1988. At the training camp for the Flames in 1988, coach Terry Crisp felt Johannson deserved an opportunity despite the depth of the organization at the center and right wing positions. Johannson returned to the Golden Eagles where he set a team record with eight short-handed goals during the 1988–89 season. He played in all 82 games during the season, scored 35 goals and 40 assists, then was released. Despite not making the NHL roster, Johannson stated that the Flames treated him well and that he departed on good terms.

Johannson discussed a potential contract with European and National Hockey League (NHL) teams, then agreed to terms with the Chicago Blackhawks in October 1989 and was assigned to the Indianapolis Ice in the IHL. He chose to sign with the Blackhawks since he had family ties to Indianapolis through his mother. He was the only player to appear in all 82 games during the 1989–90 season, and won his second Turner Cup when the Indianapolis Ice were playoffs champions. At the end of the 1990–91 season, Johannson had played 264 consecutive games spanning three seasons. He received the Ironman Award from the IHL in recognition of his durability, and offensive and defensive skills. Johannson began the final year of his contract with the Blackhawks on loan to the United States national team for the 1991–92 season. He sought a contract with a team in Switzerland after the 1992 Winter Olympics, then took time off to discuss a contract with the Blackhawks and his plan to coach hockey when he retired from playing. He returned to the Indianapolis Ice on March 13, 1992, despite no future guarantee from the Blackhawks. While in Indianapolis, he was active in the team's Say No to Drugs community service program.

The Milwaukee Admirals signed Johannson to an IHL contract in July 1992. He played 71 games during the 1992–93 season and scored 14 goals, then played 28 games and scored four goals in the 1993–94 season. He retired from professional hockey after playing 374 games in the IHL, where he scored 119 goals and 279 points.

=== International ===
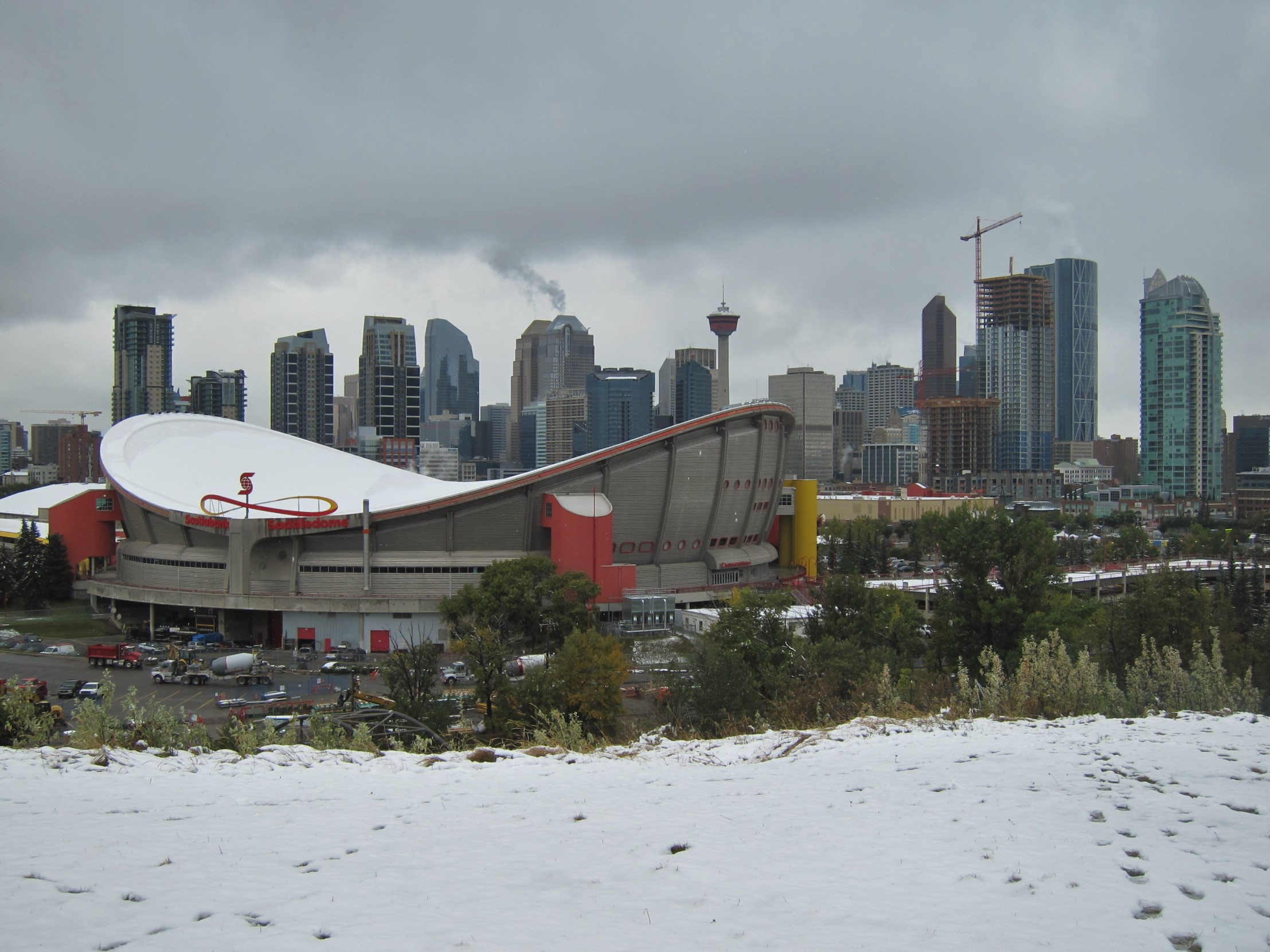
The Calgary Saddledome hosted ice hockey games at the 1988 Winter Olympics.

The United States national junior team twice named Johannson to its roster at the World Junior Championship, where the team placed fifth in 1983 in the Soviet Union, and placed sixth in 1984 in Sweden. He played for the United States national team at the 1987 Pravda Cup in Leningrad, coached by Dave Peterson who later led the United States national team at the Winter Olympics in 1988 and 1992.

Johannson was one of the first players cut from tryouts for the United States national team in advance of the 1988 Winter Olympics, but was later recalled and worked hard to be a role player on the team. He credited the support from his father and brother as motivation to make the team. During the pre-Olympic tour, Johannson played 60 games for the United States national team and scored 15 goals, 13 assists, and 28 points. In the 1988 Winter Olympics hockey tournament, he played in five of six games and one assist. The Star Tribune described him as the "top penalty killer on the team" that finished in seventh place.

Johannson was invited to play for the United States national team in ice hockey at the 1990 Goodwill Games by his former university coach Jeff Sauer. He served as captain of the team, scored two goals and had three assists in five games played, and led the United States to the silver medal.

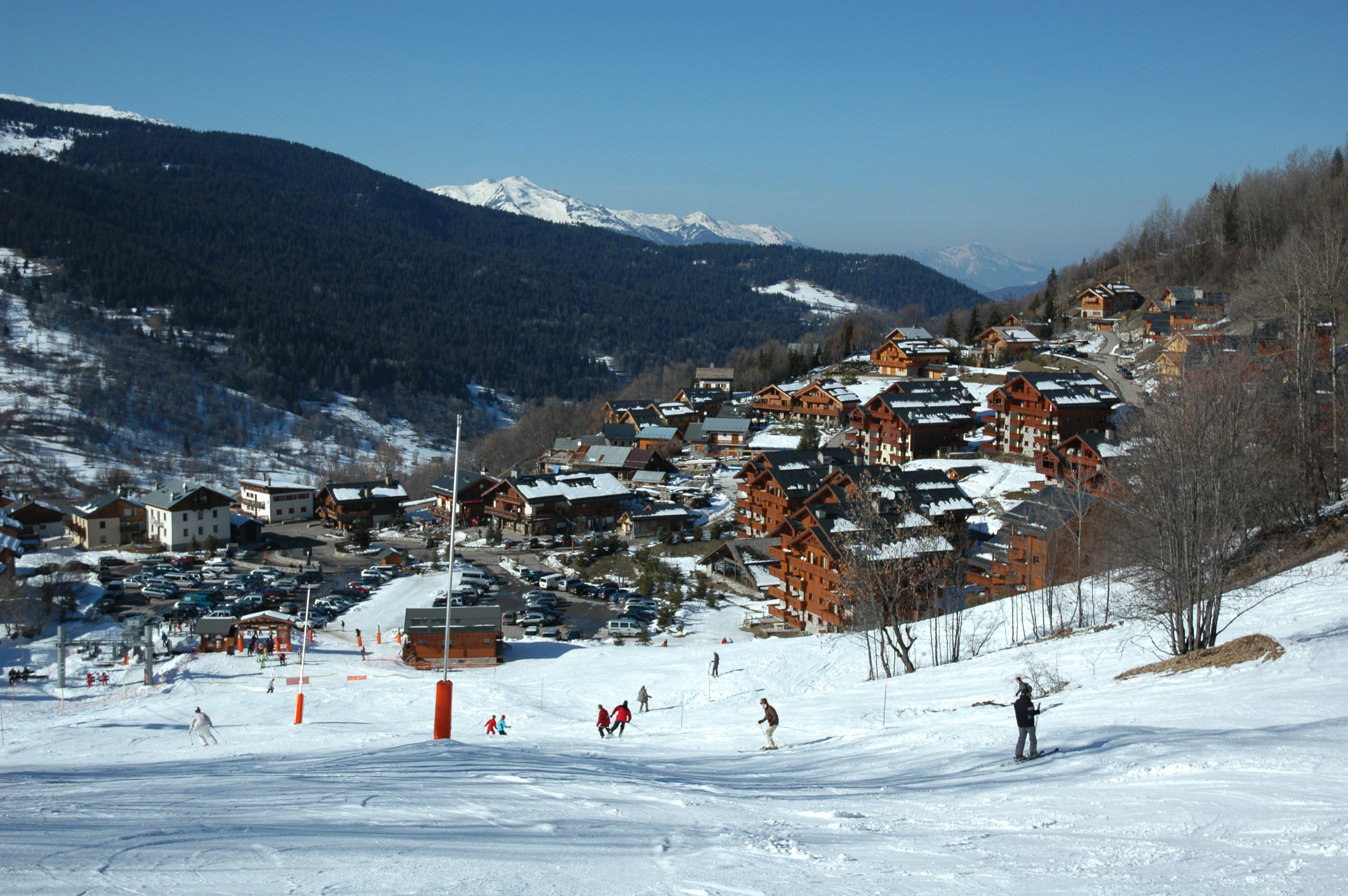
The French ski resort Méribel hosted ice hockey games at the 1992 Winter Olympics.

Johannson was named to the United States national team which played a 64-game schedule during the 1991–92 season prior to ice hockey at the 1992 Winter Olympics. He was the second oldest player on the team, and became a source of advice and leadership. His teammate Keith Tkachuk said, "[Johannson] could do almost anything for a team. He had skill, but he was a responsible guy who you could put on the ice in the last minute of a game. He was a player you relied on". The United States lost to the Unified Team by a 5–2 score in the semifinals, which Johannson felt was the most disappointing loss he had played in due to five penalties against called against the United States. The United States then placed fourth after a loss to the Czechoslovakia national hockey team in the bronze medal game.

During the Olympics, he wrote a diary for the Wisconsin State Journal about the life of an Olympic athlete and the hockey competition, and donated the money he received to the Bob Johnson Memorial Foundation. Two months later, Johannson was a member of the United States national team at the 1992 Men's Ice Hockey World Championships in Prague, which saw a seventh-place finish for the United States.

=== Playing statistics ===
==== Regular season and playoffs ====
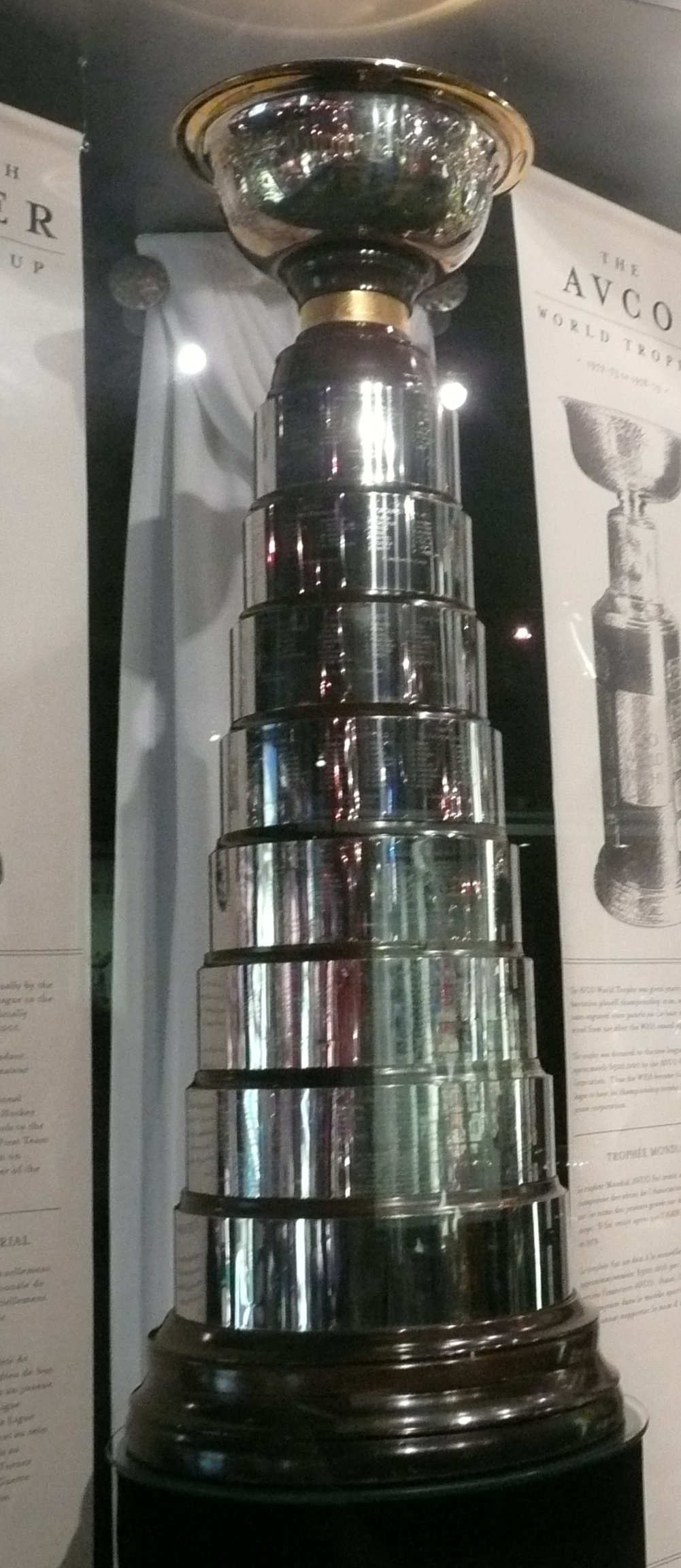
The Turner Cup trophy

Career playing statistics:

			Regular season					Playoffs
Season	Team	League	GP	G	A	Pts	PIM	GP	G	A	Pts	PIM
1981–82	Mayo High School	HSMN	27	28	32	60	20	—	—	—	—	—
1982–83	University of Wisconsin	WCHA	43	12	9	21	16	—	—	—	—	—
1983–84	University of Wisconsin	WCHA	35	17	21	38	52	—	—	—	—	—
1984–85	University of Wisconsin	WCHA	40	16	24	40	54	—	—	—	—	—
1985–86	University of Wisconsin	WCHA	30	18	13	31	44	—	—	—	—	—
1986–87	EV Landsberg	FRG.2	50	37	49	86	84	—	—	—	—	—
1987–88	United States national team	Exhibition	60	15	13	28	—	—	—	—	—	—
1987–88	Salt Lake Golden Eagles	IHL	18	14	7	21	50	19	8	15	23	55
1988–89	Salt Lake Golden Eagles	IHL	82	35	40	75	87	13	2	5	7	13
1989–90	Indianapolis Ice	IHL	82	22	41	63	74	14	1	4	5	6
1990–91	Indianapolis Ice	IHL	82	28	41	69	116	7	1	2	3	8
1991–92	Indianapolis Ice	IHL	11	2	2	4	4	—	—	—	—	—
1991–92	United States national team	Exhibition	—	—	—	—	—	—	—	—	—	—
1992–93	Milwaukee Admirals	IHL	71	14	22	36	72	5	1	0	1	6
1993–94	Milwaukee Admirals	IHL	28	4	7	11	15	—	—	—	—	—
WCHA totals			148	63	67	130	166	—	—	—	—	—
IHL totals			374	119	160	279	418	58	13	26	39	88

==== International ====
International tournament statistics:

Year	Team	Event	GP	G	A	Pts	PIM
1983	United States	WJC	7	2	1	3	10
1984	United States	WJC	7	5	4	9	6
1988	United States	OG	6	1	0	1	4
1990	United States	GG	5	2	3	5	0
1992	United States	OG	8	1	0	1	2
1992	United States	WC	6	2	1	3	2
Junior totals			14	7	5	12	16
Senior totals			25	6	4	10	8

== Twin Cities Vulcans ==
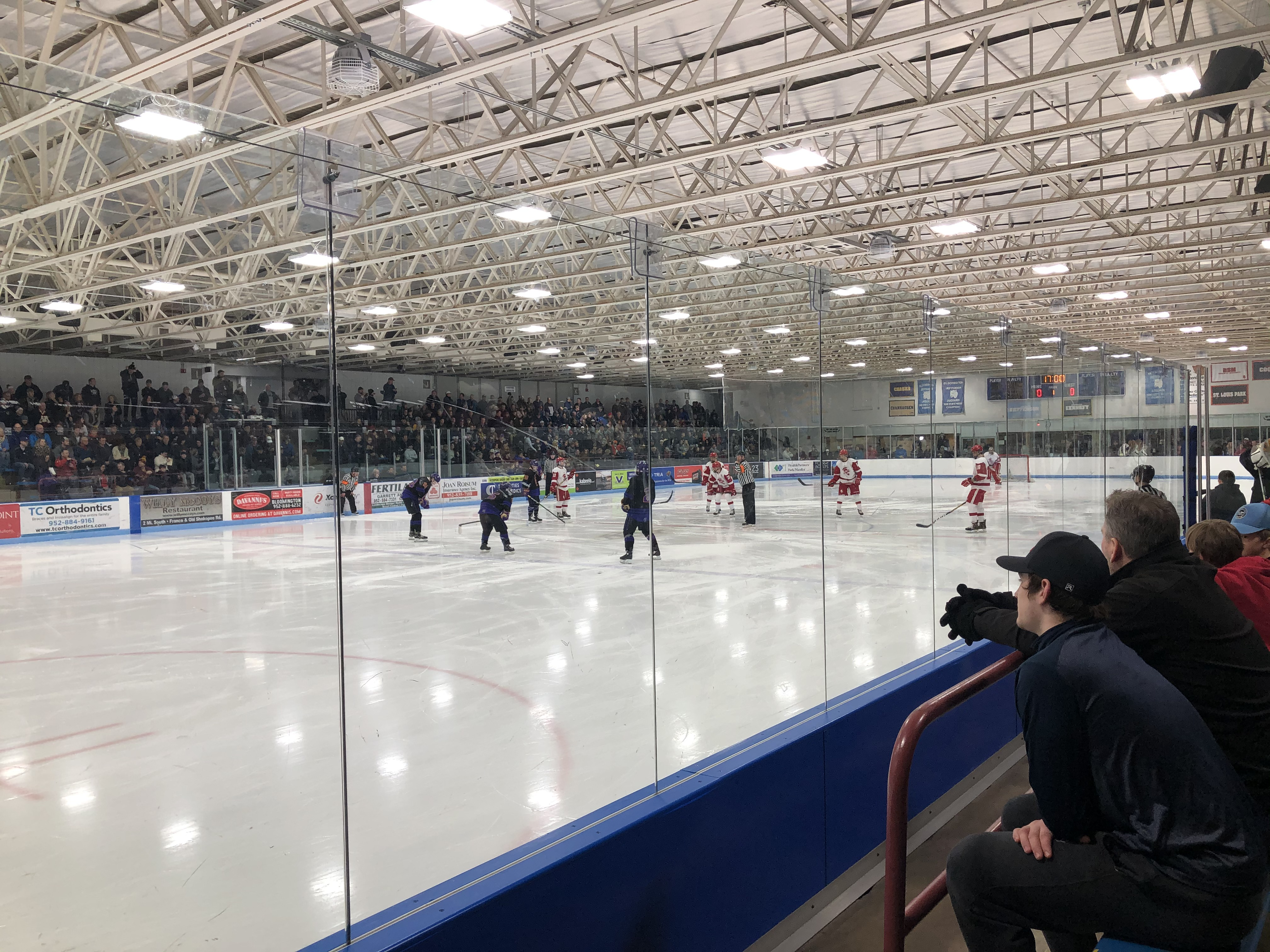
The Bloomington Ice Gardens was one of five home rinks used by the Vulcans in the Twin Cities from 1995 to 2000.

Johannson became involved in junior ice hockey when he was named head coach and general manager of the Twin Cities Vulcans in the United States Hockey League (USHL) on June 13, 1995. He led the Vulcans to an eighth-place finish in the 1995–96 season, then a best-of-seven series in the first round of the playoffs versus the first-place Green Bay Gamblers. The Vulcans won the first three games of the series, but were eliminated from the playoffs with four consecutive losses. The Vulcans placed fourth in the north division during the 1996–97 season, then were defeated four games to one by the Omaha Lancers in the first round of the playoffs. The USHL named Johannson a co-coach of the league's select team that played in the under-20 Four Nations Junior A tournament in Füssen, Germany in November 1997. The USHL Selects won the tournament with two wins and one draw in three games. In the 1997–98 season, he coached the Vulcans to 25 wins in 56 games, a sixth-place finish in the north division, but the team did not qualify for the playoffs.

Jim Hillman assumed the head coaching duties of the Vulcans in May 1998. Johannson remained as general manager of the Vulcans and served as a scout for the Nashville Predators. After a fourth-place finish in the Central Division for the 1998–99 season and a first round playoffs loss to the Des Moines Buccaneers, the Vulcans placed fifth in the West Division in the 1999–2000 season. In the playoffs, the Vulcans won their series versus the Sioux Falls Stampede and the Lincoln Stars then lost in the Clark Cup finals to the Green Bay Gamblers. The Vulcans qualified for the USA Hockey Junior A National Championship as the USHL's representative, since the Gamblers already qualified as the host team. The Vulcans defeated the Danville Wings in the semifinal, then won the national championship with a 4–1 victory versus the Gamblers.

The Vulcans were sold and relocated to Kearney, Nebraska to become the Tri-City Storm in 2000. Johannson felt that the Vulcans were victims of declining attendance and the southward geographical shift of the USHL from Minnesota to Iowa and Nebraska. When the Vulcans reduced their ticket prices to be the lowest in the USHL in 1997, Johannson stated that the team had wanted to raise prices but could not due to competition from other sports in the Twin Cities. He felt that selling the team would strengthen the USHL, which transitioned into bigger budget teams based in cities where hockey was the primary sport.

=== Coaching statistics ===
Career coaching statistics:

Season	Team	League	Games	Won	Lost	Tied	OTL	Points	Pct	Standing	Playoffs / notes
1995–96	Twin Cities Vulcans	USHL	46	18	21	3	4	43	0.467	8th, USHL	Lost in round 1
1996–97	Twin Cities Vulcans	USHL	54	25	26	0	3	53	0.491	4th, North	Lost in round 1
1997–98	Twin Cities Vulcans	USHL	56	25	26	0	5	55	0.491	6th, North	Did not qualify
TOTALS		USHL	156	68	73	3	12	151	0.484	–	

== USA Hockey executive ==
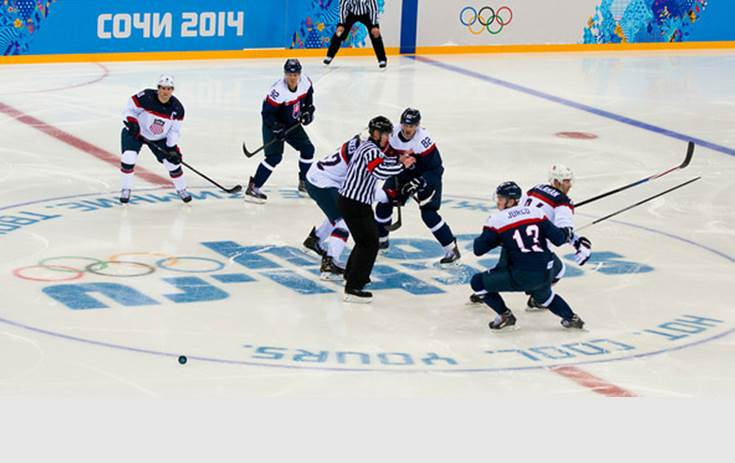
United States vs. Slovakia at the 2014 Winter Olympics

Johannson served as team leader for the United States national team at the World Championships from 1999 to 2004, and was the liaise between USA Hockey and coaching staffs. In September 2000, he became USA Hockey's manager of international activities and co-operated with the United States Olympic Committee to build national teams. He became senior director of hockey operations in August 2003, then assistant executive director of hockey operations in June 2007. As the assistant executive director of hockey operations, Johannson oversaw all men's and women's national teams assembled for international competition. In 2007, he established an advisory group to facilitate selection of players for the men's national team, participated in the selection of players for the Winter Olympics from 2002 to 2018, was the general manager of the United States national junior team from 2009 to 2018, and general manager of the United States national team for the 2018 Winter Olympics. During his tenure with USA Hockey, national teams won a combined total of 64 medals in International Ice Hockey Federation competitions, including 34 gold, 19 silver and 11 bronze.

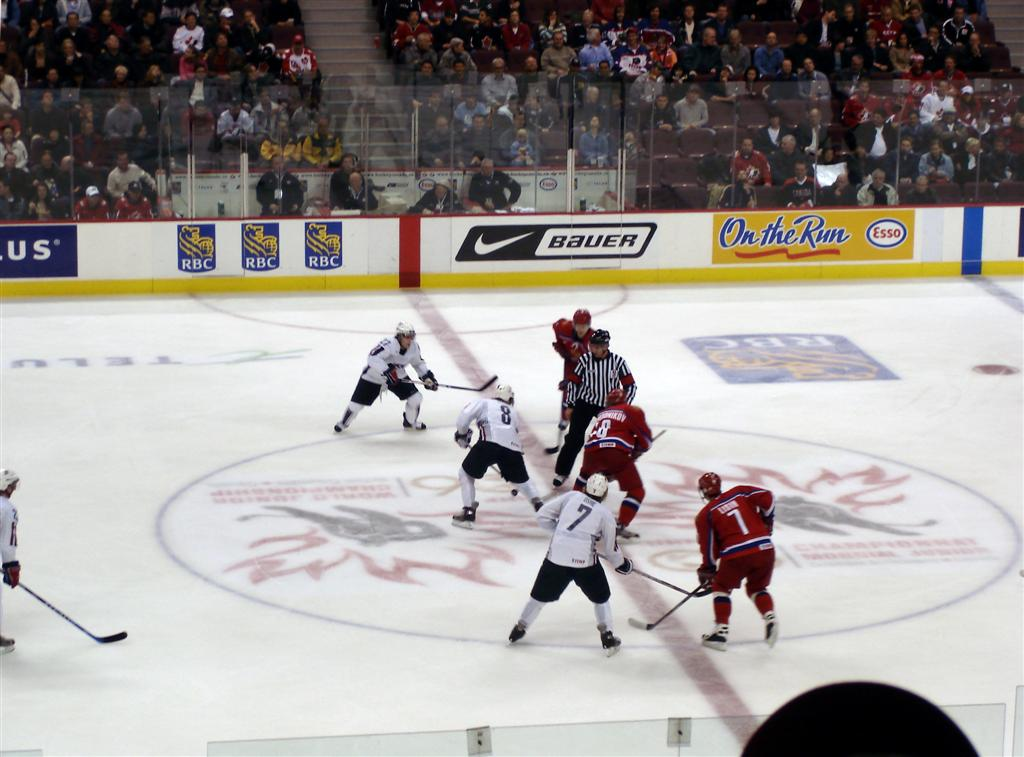
United States vs. Russia at the 2006 World Junior Ice Hockey Championships

Johannson oversaw administration for the 2005 World Junior Ice Hockey Championships when USA Hockey hosted the event in North Dakota and Minnesota, and was a guest speaker at the World Hockey Summit in 2010. He helped implement the American Development Model, and acquired Compuware Arena in 2014 to become the home rink for the USA Hockey National Team Development Program (under-18 national team). According to his brother, Johannson was passionate in his efforts for the under-20 and under-18 age groups and felt that competitions and assessments were an important part of the development process for younger players. He reportedly enjoyed international travel for these age groups and for the players to learn about the history of countries traveled to in addition to the hockey experience.

When the NHL did not permit its players to participate in ice hockey at the 2018 Winter Olympics, Johannson assembled a roster for the men's national team composed of players from the NCAA, the American Hockey League, and professional leagues in Europe. USA Hockey executive director Pat Kelleher felt that, "This Olympic team was going to be a testament to [Johannson] because no one knew the depth our player pool better than he did". Kelleher also felt that it meant as much to Johannson as the players who realized their dreams of playing in the Olympics, and that he was excited about a 25-man roster that included "25 great stories".

== Personal life ==
Johannson wrote in 1992, that he had rituals before each game. Before the end of the national anthem, he would say "forecheck, backcheck, bodycheck, guts", which was a saying from one of his minor hockey coaches in Rochester. Then before the game he would say, "don't tear the jersey", as a way to remember what his father said before youth programs at Rochester Community College.

Johannson played golf in addition to ice hockey, and resided in Colorado Springs, Colorado. He married Abigail Tompkins on September 10, 2011, and had a daughter born in December 2015. He died in his sleep due to heart disease at home in Colorado Springs on January 21, 2018, three weeks before the 2018 Winter Olympics began.

== Honors and legacy ==
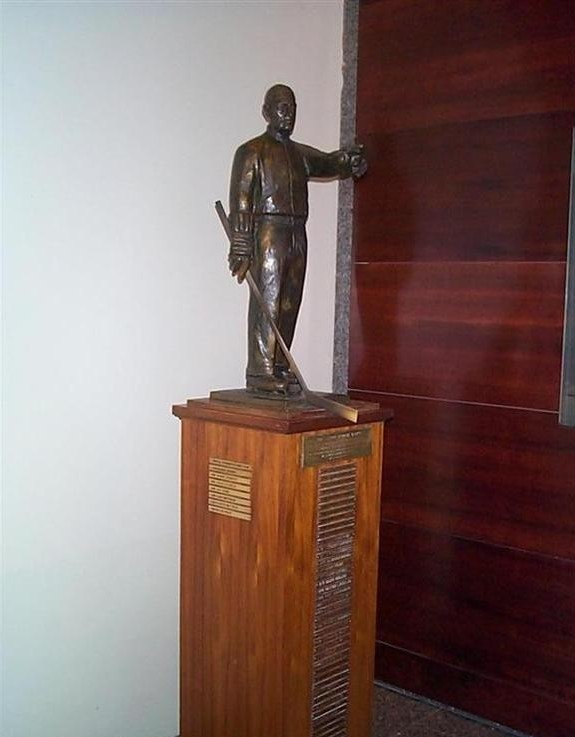
The Lester Patrick Trophy

At a conference of Minnesota State High School League athletic directors in 1999, Johannson was recognized as a distinguished alumnus of Mayo High School. He was posthumously inducted into the University of Wisconsin Athletic Hall of Fame in 2018, and was given the Lester Patrick Trophy in 2018, in recognition of his efforts to grow hockey in the United States. He was named a Paul Loicq Award recipient by the IIHF in 2019, in recognition of his contributions to international hockey.

The USA Hockey Foundation established Jim Johannson Legacy Fund in 2018, to benefit minor hockey programs across the United States. Detroit Red Wings player Dylan Larkin led efforts to arrange the Stars and Stripes Showdown held at USA Hockey Arena, an exhibition game to raise funds for the charity. The game included former players of the United States national team who asked the a portion of the proceeds benefit Johannson's family and a college fund for his daughter. In 2019, the USA Hockey College Player of the Year award was renamed to the Jim Johannson College Player of the Year award. Its recipient selects a minor hockey association to receive a US$5,000 grant from the Jim Johannson Legacy Fund.

After Johannson died, journalists recalled his work ethic and humility. Andrew Podnieks wrote, "[Johannson] was a presence at most top-level IIHF events, representing both his country and the game with friendly dignity and a strong moral compass", and that "He was both professional and humble, competitive and ethical, hard-working and amiable". David Shoalts wrote, "Jim Johannson is not a familiar name to many hockey fans but his contributions to the game in the United States went far beyond much more famous monikers", and that "Anyone who encountered Johannson was struck by his easygoing and humble nature".

Johannson's work in hockey was recognized by NHL executives. Carolina Hurricanes general manager Don Waddell said, "He was doing jobs that should've taken three people to do". Nashville Predators general manager David Poile felt that, "He's someone you could never outwork. He was the last one to bed and the first one up in the morning". League commissioner Gary Bettman stated, "In building the teams that achieved so much success for USA Hockey, Jim Johannson had a sharp eye for talent, a strong sense of chemistry and a relentless pursuit of excellence".
