= Steve Johnson (ice hockey) =

American ice hockey player (born 1966)

- Born: March 3, 1966 (age 60) Grand Forks, North Dakota, U.S.
- Height: 6 ft 1 in (185 cm)
- Weight: 190 lb (86 kg; 13 st 8 lb)
- Position: Wing
- Shot: Right
- Played for: North Dakota; Milwaukee Admirals; Phoenix Roadrunners
- NHL draft: 1987 NHL Supplemental Draft; Vancouver Canucks
- Playing career: 1984–1990
- Coaching career

Current position
- Team: Minnesota–Crookston

Biographical details
- Education: University of North Dakota

Coaching career (HC unless noted)
- 1995–1996: Fargo-Moorhead Bears
- 1996–2007: Lincoln Stars
- 2009–2010: Fargo Force
- 2010–2012: St. Cloud State (assistant)
- 2012–2013: Nebraska–Omaha (assistant)
- 2020–Present: Minnesota–Crookston

Head coaching record
- Overall: 470–219–58 (.666) [USHL]

Accomplishments and honors

Championships
- 1997 Clark Cup Championship; 2003 Clark Cup Championship

Steve Johnson (born March 3, 1966) is an American ice hockey coach and former wing who was an All-American for North Dakota.

== Career ==
Johnson joined the ice hockey program at North Dakota for the 1984–85 season. He produced modest numbers in his first two campaigns for the Sioux, helping the team to good but unspectacular finishes. The return of Tony Hrkac and the arrival of Ed Belfour changed the team's fortunes and Johnson was a beneficiary. For his junior season, Johnson's scoring production soared and he nearly tripled his career totals. He finished third on the team in scoring and led the Fighting Sioux to a WCHA title. UND won the NCAA Championship that year and ended up with 40 wins, setting a new NCAA record in the process (only 1993 Maine has won more games). Johnson was selected by the Vancouver Canucks in the Supplemental Draft after the season as he was too old to be eligible for the standard NHL entry draft.

Several of the stars from the championship team left after 1987 and North Dakota declined the following year, but Johnson got even better. Now captain of the team, Johnson became the focal point for the offense and led the Sioux in scoring. He finished in a three-way tie for the national scoring lead and was in on nearly half of North Dakota's goals for the season (48.9%). He was an All-American and led UND to a third-place finish in the conference tournament.

After graduating, Johnson played two seasons of professional hockey. Though his numbers improved after a trade to the Phoenix Roadrunners, Johnson decided to retire in 1990.

Johnson transitioned into coaching and got his first prominent role as the head coach for the expansion Fargo-Moorhead Bears in the USHL. The team finished well, ending the season 10 game above .500, but the franchise was dissolved after the season. Johnson didn't remain out of a job for long as he was brought in on another expansion team, the Lincoln Stars, the very next year. In the team's inaugural season, Johnson led them to league championship. He kept the Stars near the top of the league for much of his eleven seasons, winning a second Clark Cup in 2003 and finishing as runner-up in 2000. He resigned after the 2007 season but returned with a third USHL team two years later, taking the Fargo Force to a runner-up finish in 2010.

After a sterling career in junior hockey, Johnson returned to the college ranks as an assistant first for St. Cloud State and then Nebraska–Omaha. Afterwards, he returned home to Grand Forks as the director of youth hockey in the area. In January 2020, Johnson was brought in as the head coach for Minnesota–Crookston when the team revived its dormant program as a club team and mulled over bringing it back to varsity status.

== Statistics ==
=== Regular season and playoffs ===
| | | | Regular Season | | | | | Playoffs |
| Season | Team | League | GP | G | A | Pts | PIM | GP | G | A | Pts | PIM |
|---|---|---|---|---|---|---|---|---|---|---|---|---|
| 1983–84 | St. Albert Saints | AJHL | 58 | 37 | 60 | 97 | 0 | — | — | — | — | — |
| 1984–85 | North Dakota | WCHA | 25 | 2 | 6 | 8 | 15 | — | — | — | — | — |
| 1985–86 | North Dakota | WCHA | 38 | 8 | 20 | 28 | 18 | — | — | — | — | — |
| 1986–87 | North Dakota | WCHA | 48 | 26 | 44 | 70 | 38 | — | — | — | — | — |
| 1987–88 | North Dakota | WCHA | 42 | 34 | 51 | 85 | 28 | — | — | — | — | — |
| 1988–89 | Milwaukee Admirals | IHL | 64 | 18 | 34 | 52 | 37 | 2 | 0 | 0 | 0 | 0 |
| 1989–90 | Milwaukee Admirals | IHL | 5 | 0 | 2 | 2 | 0 | — | — | — | — | — |
| 1989–90 | Phoenix Roadrunners | IHL | 65 | 21 | 49 | 70 | 31 | — | — | — | — | — |
| NCAA totals | | | 153 | 70 | 121 | 191 | 99 | — | — | — | — | — |
| IHL totals | | | 134 | 39 | 85 | 124 | 68 | 2 | 0 | 0 | 0 | 0 |

== Coaching Record ==
=== USHL ===
| Team | Year | Regular season | | | | | | | | Postseason |
| Team | Year | G | W | L | T | OTL | SOL | Pts | Finish | Result |
|---|---|---|---|---|---|---|---|---|---|---|
| Fargo-Moorhead Bears | 1995–96 | 46 | 27 | 17 | 1 | 1 | – | (56) | 3rd | |
| Lincoln Stars | 1996–97 | 54 | 40 | 13 | 0 | 1 | – | (81) | 2nd in South | Clark Cup Champions |
| Lincoln Stars | 1997–98 | 56 | 38 | 14 | – | 3 | 1 | (77) | 3rd in South | Clark Cup Semifinals |
| Lincoln Stars | 1998–99 | 56 | 29 | 20 | 0 | 7 | – | (65) | 3rd in West | Clark Cup Semifinals |
| Lincoln Stars | 1999–00 | 58 | 41 | 16 | – | – | 1 | (83) | 1st in USHL | Clark Cup Semifinals |
| Lincoln Stars | 2000–01 | 56 | 43 | 7 | 0 | 6 | – | (92) | 1st in USHL | Clark Cup Finals |
| Lincoln Stars | 2001–02 | 61 | 43 | 15 | 0 | 3 | – | (89) | 2nd in West | Clark Cup Quarterfinals |
| Lincoln Stars | 2002–03 | 60 | 37 | 14 | – | 3 | 6 | (83) | 1st in USHL | Clark Cup Champions |
| Lincoln Stars | 2003–04 | 60 | 27 | 29 | – | 4 | 0 | (58) | 5th in West | None |
| Lincoln Stars | 2004–05 | 60 | 37 | 17 | – | 3 | 3 | (80) | T–2nd in West | Clark Cup Quarterfinals |
| Lincoln Stars | 2005–06 | 60 | 34 | 20 | – | 4 | 2 | (74) | T–2nd in West | Clark Cup Semifinals |
| Lincoln Stars | 2006–07 | 60 | 37 | 20 | – | 1 | 2 | (77) | 3rd in West | Clark Cup Quarterfinals |
| Fargo Force | 2009–10 | 60 | 37 | 17 | – | 1 | 5 | (80) | 2nd in West | Clark Cup Finals |
| Totals | | 747 | 470 | 219 | 1 | 37 | 20 | — | — | — |

== Awards and honors ==
| Award | Year |
|---|---|
| All-WCHA First Team | 1987–88 |
| AHCA West First-Team All-American | 1987–88 |

Awards and achievements
| Preceded by Tony Granato | WCHA Student-Athlete of the Year; 1987–88 | Succeeded by Tim Budy |
| Preceded by Tony Hrkac | NCAA Ice Hockey Scoring Champion; 1987–88 With Dave Capuano and Paul Polillo | Succeeded by Bobby Reynolds/Kip Miller |
