= Nate DiCasmirro =

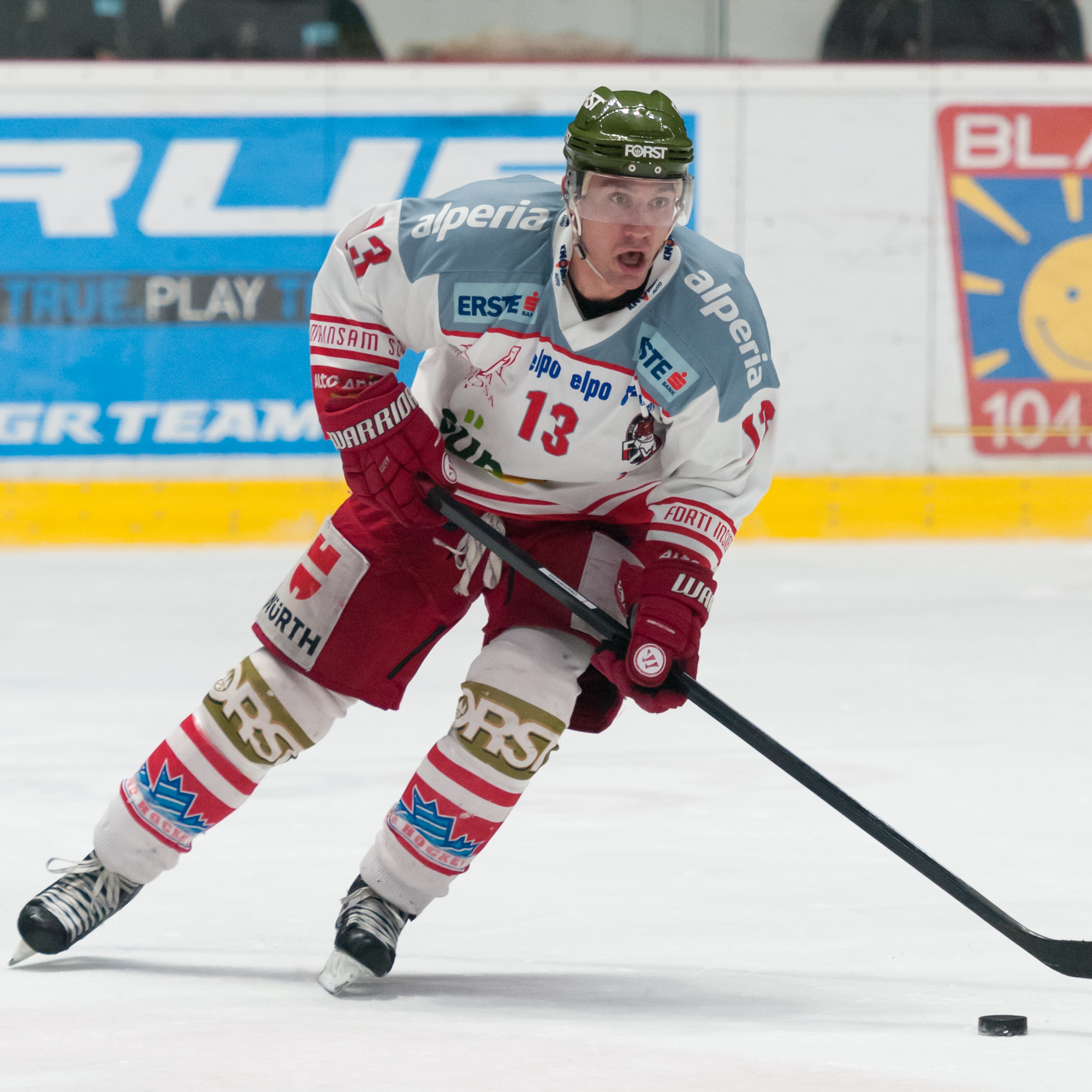
- Born: September 27, 1978 (age 47) Atikokan, Ontario, Canada
- Height: 5 ft 10 in (178 cm)
- Weight: 194 lb (88 kg; 13 st 12 lb)
- Position: Right wing
- Shot: Left
- Played for: Hamilton Bulldogs; Toronto Roadrunners; Edmonton Roadrunners; Grand Rapids Griffins; Providence Bruins; San Antonio Rampage; Syracuse Crunch; HC Bolzano; Timrå IK; EC VSV; Brunico SG; HC Valpellice; Sheffield Steelers; HDD Jesenice
- National team: Italy
- NHL draft: Undrafted
- Playing career: 2002–2019

Nate DiCasmirro (born September 27, 1978) is a Canadian-born Italian former professional ice hockey right winger who was born in Atikokan, Ontario, but grew up in Burnsville, Minnesota, a suburb of Minneapolis. He most notably played in the American Hockey League and for the Italian national team.

== Personal life ==
He holds dual Canadian and U.S. citizenship and is of Italian descent.

== Career ==
DiCasmirro left home as a teenager to play midget AAA hockey in Marquette, Michigan, and later played for St. Cloud State University. He was signed as a free agent in 2002 by the Edmonton Oilers and was sent to play in the minor leagues. In 2006, he signed as an unrestricted free agent with the Boston Bruins and was assigned to play right wing for the Providence Bruins of the American Hockey League (AHL). On December 6, 2007, he was traded to the Phoenix Coyotes along with a 5th round draft pick in the 2009 NHL Entry Draft for goaltender Alex Auld.

He played several seasons in the AHL and then with Bolzano HC in the Italian Serie A, before being released on December 25, 2008. DiCasmirro then signed a short-term contract to play with Swedish team Timrå IK on January 6, 2009. Having played ten games for the Elitserien team, he continued his visit to Sweden by signing for HockeyAllsvenskan newcomers Örebro HK on September 11, 2009. He moved later in the season to the Austrian Hockey League for EC VSV and in 2010 he signed for Brunico in Serie A.

On August 23, 2015, DiCasmirro returned to the Austrian EBEL, signing for a second stint with Italian club, HC Bolzano, as a free agent on a one-year contract.

Following his seventeenth professional season at the conclusion of the 2018–19 campaign playing with EC KAC second tier Alps Hockey League team, DiCasmirro opted to conclude his career with the intention to remain within EC KAC as a junior coach on March 25, 2019. In 2021, he was hired by the Minnesota Wild to be an assistant coach with their AHL affiliate, the Iowa Wild.

== Career statistics ==
=== Regular season and playoffs ===
			Regular season					Playoffs
Season	Team	League	GP	G	A	Pts	PIM	GP	G	A	Pts	PIM
1994–95	Burnsville High School	HS-MN
1995–96	North Iowa Huskies	USHL	38	1	8	9	28	—	—	—	—	—
1996–97	North Iowa Huskies	USHL	51	18	22	40	86	12	0	6	6	22
1997–98	North Iowa Huskies	USHL	52	29	45	74	118	11	5	5	10	34
1998–99	St. Cloud State University	WCHA	34	6	8	14	46	—	—	—	—	—
1999–2000	St. Cloud State University	WCHA	40	19	24	43	26	—	—	—	—	—
2000–01	St. Cloud State University	WCHA	32	9	20	29	26	—	—	—	—	—
2001–02	St. Cloud State University	WCHA	41	17	33	50	58	—	—	—	—	—
2001–02	Hamilton Bulldogs	AHL	1	0	0	0	0	10	0	5	5	6
2002–03	Hamilton Bulldogs	AHL	49	5	12	17	22	16	2	1	3	8
2003–04	Toronto Roadrunners	AHL	71	17	18	35	37	2	0	1	1	0
2004–05	Edmonton Roadrunners	AHL	77	7	18	25	48	—	—	—	—	—
2005–06	Grand Rapids Griffins	AHL	72	16	36	52	97	16	3	3	6	20
2006–07	Providence Bruins	AHL	68	10	18	28	59	13	4	0	4	10
2007–08	Providence Bruins	AHL	20	2	3	5	12	—	—	—	—	—
2007–08	San Antonio Rampage	AHL	23	6	2	8	16	—	—	—	—	—
2007–08	Syracuse Crunch	AHL	20	3	10	13	8	13	3	4	7	12
2008–09	HC Bolzano	ITL	23	6	9	15	40	—	—	—	—	—
2008–09	Timrå IK	SEL	10	3	2	5	4	—	—	—	—	—
2009–10	Örebro HK	Allsv	19	2	2	4	6	—	—	—	—	—
2009–10	EC VSV	EBEL	25	4	10	14	14	5	0	0	0	4
2010–11	HC Pustertal Wölfe	ITL	40	16	21	37	56	15	4	11	15	20
2011–12	HC Pustertal Wölfe	ITL	26	5	10	15	26	13	5	4	9	10
2012–13	HC Valpellice	ITL	44	11	40	51	54	15	4	10	14	48
2013–14	Sheffield Steelers	EIHL	54	6	32	38	34	4	1	5	6	2
2014–15	HC Valpellice	ITL	34	13	25	38	44	5	0	1	1	4
2015–16	HC Bolzano	EBEL	54	6	13	19	24	6	1	5	6	4
2016–17	HDD Jesenice	AlpsHL	28	7	18	25	12	9	2	4	6	10
2016–17	HDD Jesenice	SVN	—	—	—	—	—	5	4	4	8	0
2017–18	HC Pustertal Wölfe	AlpsHL	25	5	14	19	16	9	0	5	5	4
2017–18	HC Pustertal Wölfe	ITL	2	1	1	2	2	—	—	—	—	—
2018–19	EC KAC II	AlpsHL	18	2	6	8	4	—	—	—	—	—
AHL totals			401	66	117	183	299	70	12	14	26	56
ITL totals			169	52	106	158	222	47	13	26	39	82

=== International ===
Year	Team	Event	Result	GP	G	A	Pts	PIM
2013	Italy	OGQ	DNQ	3	1	0	1	2
2013	Italy	WC D1A	18th	5	1	1	2	6
2014	Italy	WC	15th	7	0	1	1	2
2015	Italy	WC D1A	21st	5	0	0	0	4
2016	Italy	OGQ	DNQ	3	0	0	0	0
Senior totals				23	2	2	4	14

== Awards and honors ==
Award	Year
USHL
Dave Tyler Junior Player of the Year Award	1998
College
All-WCHA Second Team	2001–02
