= Scott Clemmensen =

American ice hockey player (born 1977)

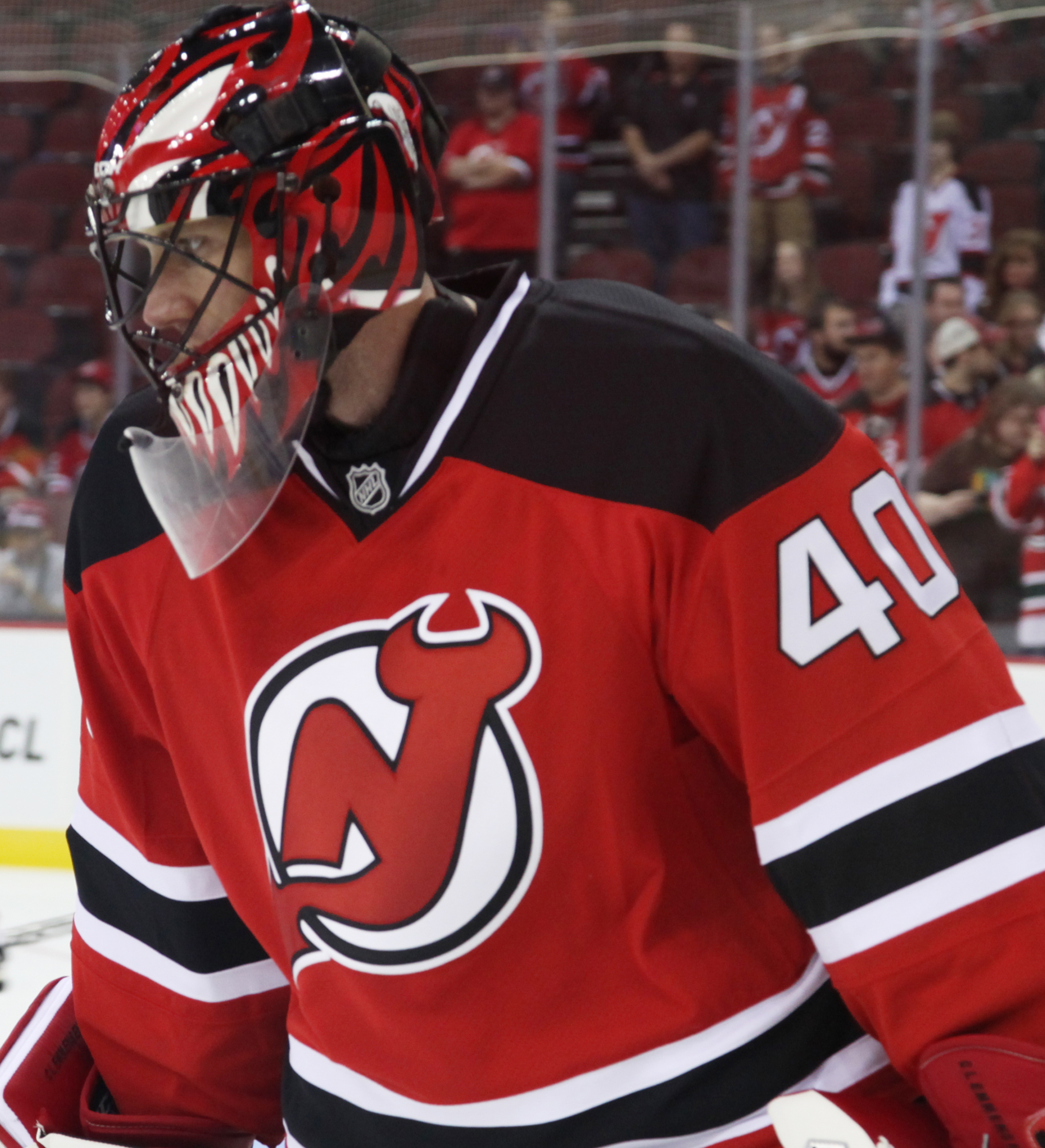
- Clemmensen in September 2014
- Born: July 23, 1977 (age 49) Des Moines, Iowa, U.S.
- Height: 6 ft 3 in (191 cm)
- Weight: 215 lb (98 kg; 15 st 5 lb)
- Position: Goaltender
- Caught: Left
- Played for: New Jersey Devils; Toronto Maple Leafs; Florida Panthers
- National team: United States
- NHL draft: 215th overall, 1997; New Jersey Devils
- Playing career: 2000–2015

Scott Lee Clemmensen (born July 23, 1977) is an American former professional ice hockey goaltender. Drafted in the eighth round, 215th overall, of the 1997 NHL entry draft, he played with the New Jersey Devils, Toronto Maple Leafs, and Florida Panthers of the National Hockey League (NHL).

== Playing career ==
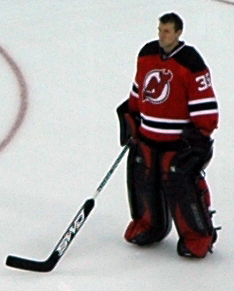
Clemmensen with the New Jersey Devils

A native of Urbandale, Iowa, Clemmensen was drafted by the New Jersey Devils in the eighth round, 215th overall, of the 1997 NHL entry draft after playing high school ice hockey with the Des Moines Capitals of the MHSHL, and then junior ice hockey with the Des Moines Buccaneers of the United States Hockey League (USHL). Upon being drafted, Clemmensen went on to play college ice hockey with the Boston College Eagles from 1997 to 2001, and won the NCAA national championship with them as a senior. He played in four consecutive NCAA tournaments, reaching the Frozen Four all four years and the title game three of the four times. As of 2024, he holds the NCAA record for most career wins in the tournament, with 10 victories.

Turning professional in the 2001–02 season, Clemmensen made his NHL debut in New Jersey's season-opening 6–1 loss to the Washington Capitals, and played in two games for the Devils, while playing the majority of his professional rookie season with the Albany River Rats of the American Hockey League (AHL), the Devils' minor league affiliate. He remained for the following three seasons in Albany, competing with fellow Devils' goaltending prospect Ari Ahonen for starts. In 2003–04, Clemmensen was called up and appeared in four games for the Devils, posting a 1.01 goals against average (GAA). He received his first NHL start against the Pittsburgh Penguins on January 20, 2004, winning 3–0. In doing so, Clemmensen became the first player in NHL history to have been born in the state of Iowa.

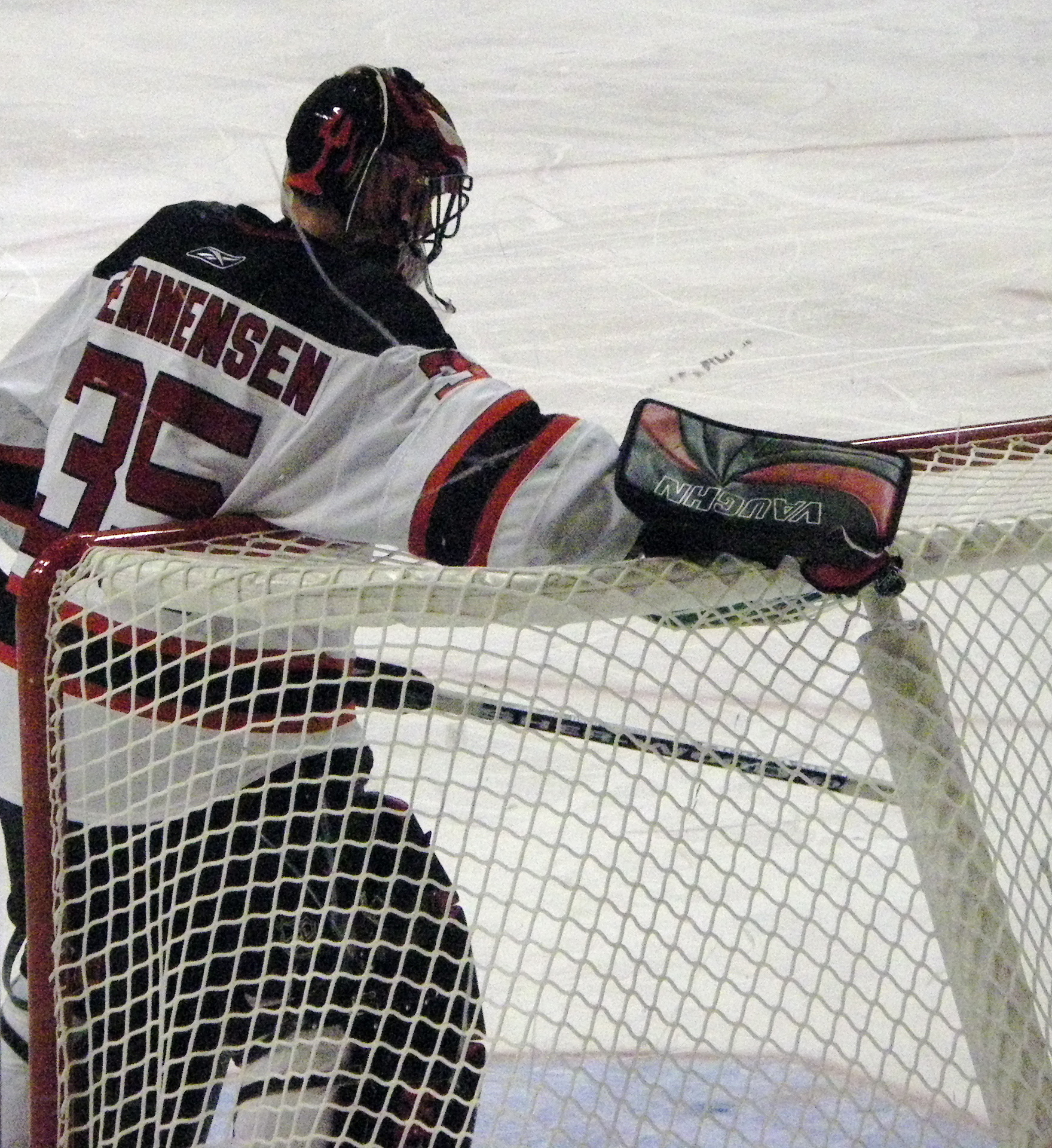
Clemmensen in 2009

Following the 2004–05 NHL lockout, Clemmensen became Martin Brodeur's permanent backup, appearing in 13 games (starting in nine) and posting a 3.35 GAA during the 2005–06 season. The following year, he appeared in six games in relief of Brodeur, recording a 3.14 GAA. In the off-season, Clemmensen became a free agent and after the Devils signed Kevin Weekes to back up Brodeur, Clemmensen signed a one-year, two-way contract with the Toronto Maple Leafs on July 6, 2007. He played the majority of the 2007–08 season splitting starts with Maple Leafs' Justin Pogge with the Toronto Marlies of the AHL, while appearing in three games for the Maple Leafs. He made his first start with the Maple Leafs on January 1, 2008, as the result of an injury to starter Vesa Toskala, and recorded a 4–3 shootout win against the Tampa Bay Lightning. Going into the 2007 Calder Cup playoffs back with the Marlies, Clemmensen assumed the starting role over Pogge and helped the club to the Western Conference semifinals against the Chicago Wolves, where they were eliminated in five games.

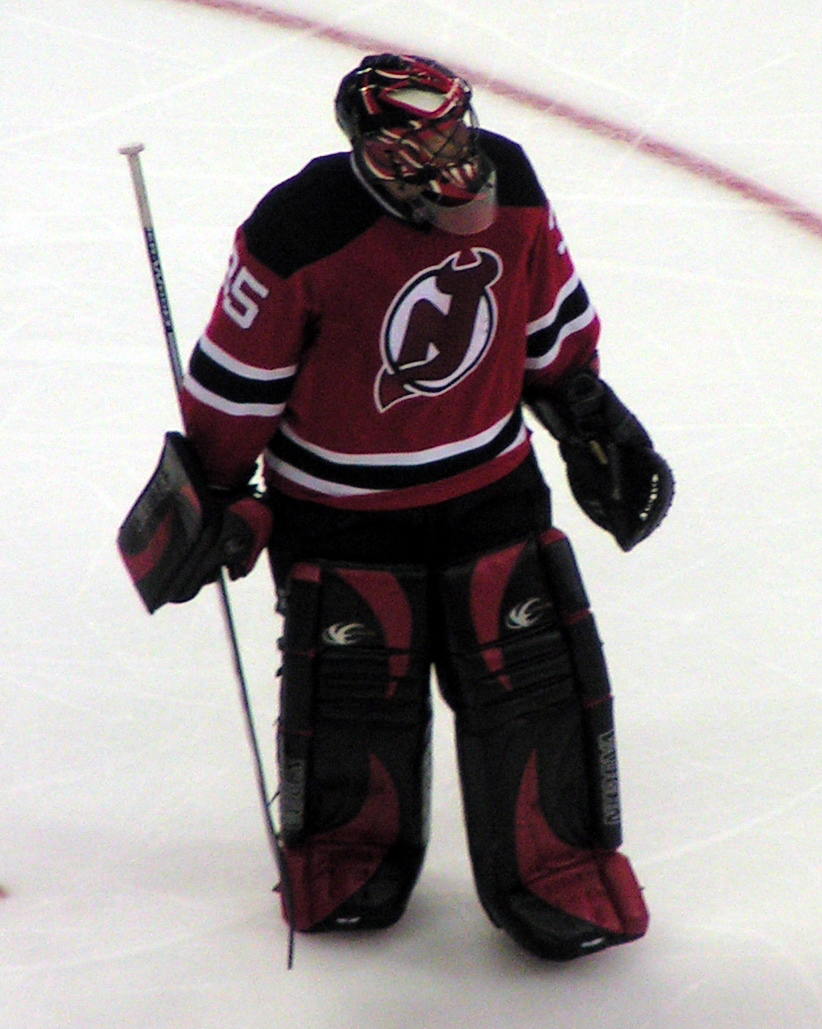
Clemmensen with his old number #35

On July 10, 2008, Clemmensen returned to the New Jersey Devils, signing a one-year contract. He started the 2008–09 season with New Jersey's new AHL affiliate, the Lowell Devils. However, when Brodeur suffered a major injury early in the season, Clemmensen was called up to backup second-string goaltender Kevin Weekes. However, as Weekes struggled in his early starts following Brodeur's injury, Clemmensen took over and started the majority of the games in Brodeur's absence. On February 25, 2009, Brodeur was taken off the injured reserve and Clemmensen was sent back to the Lowell Devils. In 40 games, Clemmensen posted a 25–13–1 record and two shutouts. His 25 wins are the highest total by a goaltender besides Brodeur in franchise history, while his 2.39 GAA and .917 save percentage were statistically in the league's top ten. He was awarded the Devils' Unsung Hero Award, as voted by his teammates, and was also selected as the Devils' nominee for the Bill Masterton Memorial Trophy. He was not, however, retained as one of the league's three finalists. In April 2009, Clemmensen was called up once again, this time to backup Brodeur for the 2009 playoffs after an injury to Weekes.

Clemmensen signed with the Florida Panthers on July 1, 2009. On November 3, 2011, the Panthers loaned Clemmensen, who suffered a knee injury in the pre-season, to the San Antonio Rampage of the AHL for conditioning purposes. He eventually reunited with former Devils teammate, John Madden in 2012, helping the Panthers clinch the playoffs for the first time in 12 years. On July 1, 2012, he was signed to a two-year contract extension by the Panthers.

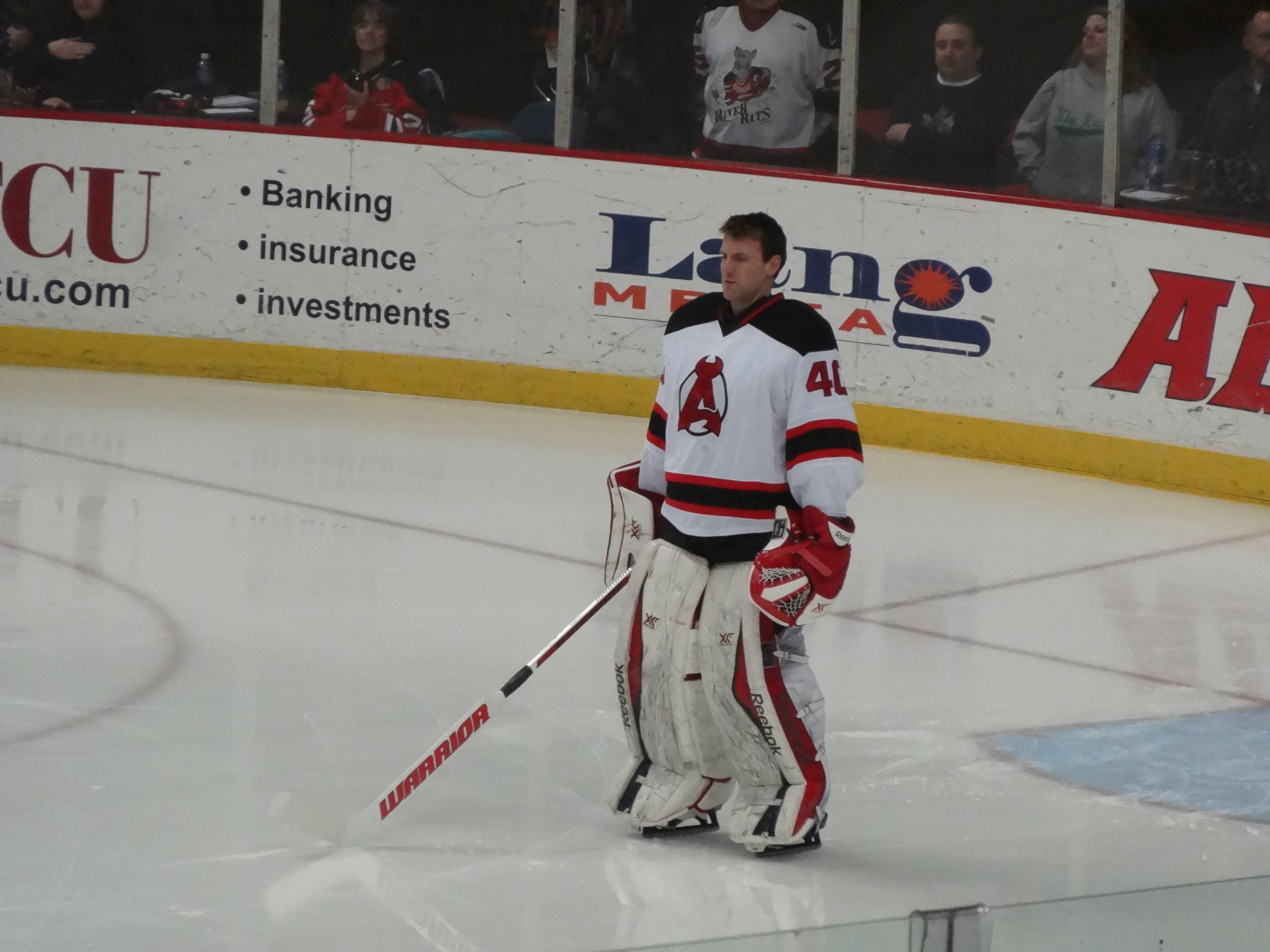
Clemmensen with the Albany Devils in 2015.

On July 1, 2014, Clemmensen returned to his original club, the New Jersey Devils as a free agent on a one-year contract.

== Post-playing career ==
On June 30, 2015, Clemmensen ended his playing career but remained with the Devils in accepting a development goaltending coach role. In 2021, he was made the team's director of goaltending development.

== International play ==
On May 1, 2009, Clemmensen was selected to represent the United States national team at the 2009 World Championship as the starting goaltender. He also played for the United States in the 2010 World Championship, posting two consecutive shutouts – a 10–0 win over Kazakhstan national team, which he shared with Ben Bishop, and a 4–0 victory against France national team.

== Career statistics ==
=== Regular season and playoffs ===
			Regular season										Playoffs
Season	Team	League	GP	W	L	T	OTL	MIN	GA	SO	GAA	SV%	GP	W	L	MIN	GA	SO	GAA	SV%
1995–96	Des Moines Buccaneers	USHL	20	10	7	1	—	1,082	62	0	3.44	—	—	—	—	—	—	—	—	—
1996–97	Des Moines Buccaneers	USHL	36	22	9	2	—	2,042	111	1	3.26	.907	4	1	2	200	9	1	2.70	—
1997–98	Boston College	H-East	37	24	9	4	—	2,205	102	4	2.78	.884	—	—	—	—	—	—	—	—
1998–99	Boston College	H-East	42	26	12	4	—	2,507	120	1	2.87	—	—	—	—	—	—	—	—	—
1999–00	Boston College	H-East	29	19	7	0	—	1,610	59	5	2.20	.914	—	—	—	—	—	—	—	—
2000–01	Boston College	H-East	39	30	7	2	—	2,312	82	3	2.13	.914	—	—	—	—	—	—	—	—
2001–02	New Jersey Devils	NHL	2	0	0	0	—	20	1	0	2.95	.800	—	—	—	—	—	—	—	—
2001–02	Albany River Rats	AHL	29	5	19	4	—	1,677	92	0	3.29	.908	—	—	—	—	—	—	—	—
2002–03	Albany River Rats	AHL	47	12	24	8	—	2,694	119	1	2.65	.910	—	—	—	—	—	—	—	—
2003–04	Albany River Rats	AHL	22	5	12	4	—	1,309	67	0	3.07	.902	—	—	—	—	—	—	—	—
2003–04	New Jersey Devils	NHL	4	3	1	0	—	238	4	2	1.01	.952	—	—	—	—	—	—	—	—
2004–05	Albany River Rats	AHL	46	13	25	5	—	2,654	124	2	2.81	.916	—	—	—	—	—	—	—	—
2005–06	New Jersey Devils	NHL	13	3	4	—	2	627	35	0	3.35	.881	1	0	0	7	0	0	0.00	1.000
2005–06	Albany River Rats	AHL	1	0	1	—	0	59	5	0	5.05	.848	—	—	—	—	—	—	—	—
2006–07	New Jersey Devils	NHL	6	1	1	—	2	305	16	0	3.15	.889	—	—	—	—	—	—	—	—
2006–07	Lowell Devils	AHL	1	1	0	—	0	60	0	1	0.00	1.00	—	—	—	—	—	—	—	—
2007–08	Toronto Marlies	AHL	40	23	14	—	2	2,363	96	1	2.44	.910	17	8	9	992	50	0	3.02	.902
2007–08	Toronto Maple Leafs	NHL	3	1	1	—	0	154	10	0	3.90	.839	—	—	—	—	—	—	—	—
2008–09	Lowell Devils	AHL	12	6	5	—	1	707	40	0	3.39	.900	—	—	—	—	—	—	—	—
2008–09	New Jersey Devils	NHL	40	25	13	—	1	2,356	94	2	2.39	.917	—	—	—	—	—	—	—	—
2009–10	Florida Panthers	NHL	23	9	8	—	2	1,215	59	1	2.91	.912	—	—	—	—	—	—	—	—
2010–11	Florida Panthers	NHL	31	8	11	—	7	1,696	74	1	2.62	.911	—	—	—	—	—	—	—	—
2011–12	Florida Panthers	NHL	30	14	6	—	6	1,566	67	1	2.57	.913	3	1	2	179	7	0	2.35	.920
2011–12	San Antonio Rampage	AHL	1	1	0	—	0	60	1	0	1.00	.969	—	—	—	—	—	—	—	—
2012–13	Florida Panthers	NHL	19	3	7	—	2	866	53	0	3.67	.874	—	—	—	—	—	—	—	—
2013–14	San Antonio Rampage	AHL	11	4	7	—	0	652	31	0	2.85	.907	—	—	—	—	—	—	—	—
2013–14	Florida Panthers	NHL	17	6	7	—	1	914	47	0	3.09	.896	—	—	—	—	—	—	—	—
2014–15	New Jersey Devils	NHL	3	0	0	—	1	102	8	0	4.71	.852	—	—	—	—	—	—	—	—
2014–15	Albany Devils	AHL	27	12	11	—	2	1,558	58	2	2.23	.918	—	—	—	—	—	—	—	—
NHL totals			191	73	59	0	24	10,060	468	7	2.79	.905	4	1	2	186	7	0	2.25	.923

=== International ===
Year	Team	Event	GP	W	L	T	MIN	GA	SO	GAA	SV%
2010	United States	WC	6	3	3	0	347	9	1	1.56	.941
Senior totals			6	3	3	0	347	9	1	1.56	.941

== Awards and honors ==
Award	Year	Ref
All- Hockey East Rookie Team	1998	
Hockey East All-Tournament Team	1999, 2001	
NCAA All-Tournament Team	2001	

Awards and achievements
Preceded by Ty Conklin	Hockey East Goaltending Champion; 1999–2000	Succeeded by Ty Conklin
