= Noah Clarke =

American ice hockey player (born 1979)

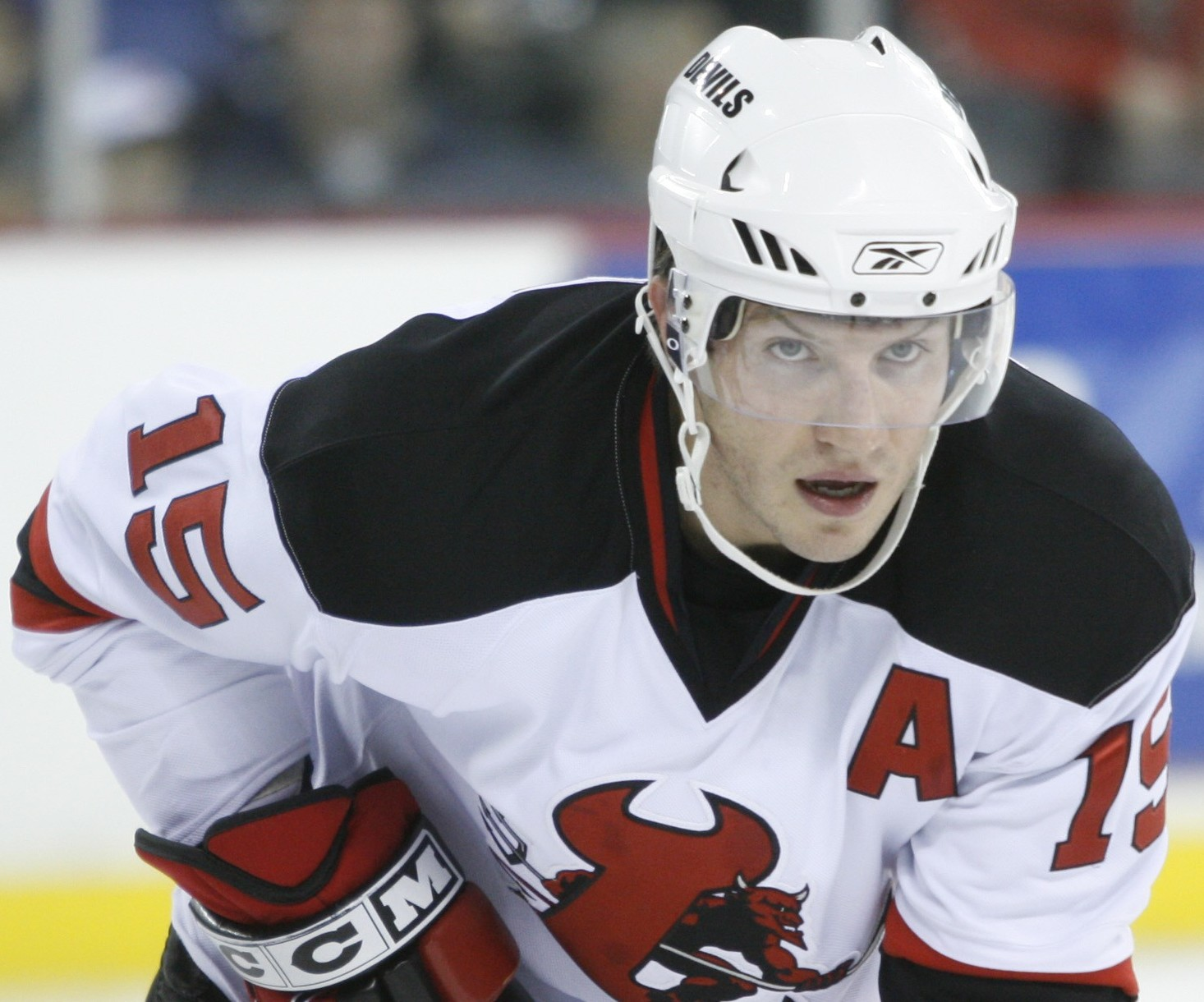
- Clarke with the Lowell Devils during the 2007-08 season
- Born: June 11, 1979 (age 46) La Verne, California, U.S.
- Height: 5 ft 9 in (175 cm)
- Weight: 185 lb (84 kg; 13 st 3 lb)
- Position: Left wing
- Shot: Left
- Played for: Los Angeles Kings; New Jersey Devils; HC Ambrì-Piotta; Lukko; Slavia Praha; Augsburger Panther; EHC München; Belfast Giants
- NHL draft: 250th overall, 1999; Los Angeles Kings
- Playing career: 2003–2013

Noah Clarke (born June 11, 1979) is an American former professional ice hockey left winger. He played 21 games in the National Hockey League with the Los Angeles Kings and New Jersey Devils between 2003 and 2008. The rest of his career, which lasted from 2003 to 2013, was spent in the minor leagues and then in Europe.

== Biography ==
Clarke was born in La Verne, California, and as a young player, he took part in the 1992 and 1993 Quebec International Pee-Wee Hockey Tournaments, representing a minor ice hockey team based in Ontario, California.

Clarke made his NHL debut on December 16, 2003, facing the Edmonton Oilers, and later scored his first NHL goal against the same team on March 12, 2007. With that goal, he became the first Southern California native to score for the Los Angeles Kings. In 2007, Clarke signed with the New Jersey Devils, and the following year, in May 2008, he agreed to a two-year deal with HC Ambrì-Piotta of Switzerland's National League. While playing in Ambrì, he teamed up with fellow former NHLer Erik Westrum and was coached by John Harrington, a member of the 1980 U.S. Olympic gold medal team. Clarke departed Ambrì on December 17 and joined Rauman Lukko in Finland. The next season, he returned to Ambrì before splitting his time with HC Slavia Prague in the Czech Extraliga.

On July 16, 2010, Clarke agreed to a one-year deal as a free agent to join Augsburger Panther in Germany's Deutsche Eishockey Liga. Later, on June 29, 2012, he signed with the Belfast Giants of the British Elite Ice Hockey League.

== Career statistics ==
=== Regular season and playoffs ===
			Regular season					Playoffs
Season	Team	League	GP	G	A	Pts	PIM	GP	G	A	Pts	PIM
1997–98	Des Moines Buccaneers	USHL	54	19	30	49	29	12	2	9	11	23
1998–99	Des Moines Buccaneers	USHL	52	31	32	63	47	13	8	2	10	16
1999–00	Colorado College	WCHA	39	17	20	37	30	—	—	—	—	—
2000–01	Colorado College	WCHA	41	12	20	32	22	—	—	—	—	—
2001–02	Colorado College	WCHA	42	13	24	37	32	—	—	—	—	—
2002–03	Colorado College	WCHA	42	21	49	70	15	—	—	—	—	—
2002–03	Manchester Monarchs	AHL	3	1	1	2	0	—	—	—	—	—
2003–04	Los Angeles Kings	NHL	2	0	1	1	0	—	—	—	—	—
2003–04	Manchester Monarchs	AHL	71	25	26	51	24	6	3	1	4	4
2004–05	Manchester Monarchs	AHL	61	21	24	45	24	6	1	0	1	4
2005–06	Los Angeles Kings	NHL	5	0	0	0	0	—	—	—	—	—
2005–06	Manchester Monarchs	AHL	69	14	30	44	33	7	4	4	8	2
2006–07	Los Angeles Kings	NHL	13	2	0	2	4	—	—	—	—	—
2006–07	Manchester Monarchs	AHL	63	24	33	57	27	16	1	3	4	4
2007–08	New Jersey Devils	NHL	1	1	0	1	0	—	—	—	—	—
2007–08	Lowell Devils	AHL	47	14	17	31	25	—	—	—	—	—
2008–09	HC Ambrì-Piotta	NLA	28	8	13	21	16	—	—	—	—	—
2008–09	Lukko	SM-l	25	2	7	9	10	—	—	—	—	—
2009–10	HC Ambrì-Piotta	NLA	22	5	3	8	16	—	—	—	—	—
2009–10	HC Slavia Praha	CZE	13	1	1	2	14	13	0	2	2	6
2010–11	Augsburger Panther	DEL	52	17	30	47	44	—	—	—	—	—
2011–12	EHC München	DEL	18	1	4	5	10	—	—	—	—	—
2012–13	Belfast Giants	EIHL	52	21	37	58	26	4	2	2	4	2
AHL totals			314	99	131	230	133	35	9	8	17	14
NHL totals			21	3	1	4	4	—	—	—	—	—

== Awards and honors ==
Award	Year
All-WCHA Rookie Team	1999–00
All-WCHA Second Team	2002–03
AHCA West First-Team All-American	2002–03
