= Chris Hartsburg =

American ice hockey player and coach

- Born: May 30, 1980 (age 45) Edina, Minnesota, U.S.
- Height: 6 ft 0 in (183 cm)
- Weight: 201 lb (91 kg; 14 st 5 lb)
- Position: Centre
- Shot: Right
- Played for: Albany River Rats (AHL); Colorado Eagles (CHL)
- NHL draft: 214th overall, 1999; New Jersey Devils
- Playing career: 2002–2008

Chris Hartsburg (born May 30, 1980) is an American former professional ice hockey player and former head coach of the Erie Otters.

== Playing and coaching career ==
Hartsburg was selected by the New Jersey Devils in the 7th round (214th overall) of the 1999 NHL entry draft. Before entering the NHL, he played junior hockey for the Omaha Lancers and NCAA hockey for Colorado College.

Hartsburg was an assistant coach with the Everett Silvertips of the Western Hockey League from 2011 to 2013 before taking an assistant coaching position with the Erie Otters for the 2013-2014 season. From 2014 to 2017, he was the head coach for the Lincoln Stars of the United States Hockey League.

On June 20, 2017, Hartsburg was named the head coach of the Erie Otters of the Ontario Hockey League. He coached the Otters for 4 years.

== Personal life ==
Hartsburg is the son of former NHL player and coach Craig Hartsburg, and was born in Edina, Minnesota, while his father was a member of the Minnesota North Stars.

== Career statistics ==
			Regular season					Playoffs
Season	Team	League	GP	G	A	Pts	PIM	GP	G	A	Pts	PIM
1997–98	Omaha Lancers	USHL	54	16	19	35	58	12	2	2	4	20
1998–99	Colorado College	NCAA	34	6	4	10	60	—	—	—	—	—
1999–00	Colorado College	NCAA	33	3	2	5	50	—	—	—	—	—
2000–01	Colorado College	NCAA	41	8	7	15	38	—	—	—	—	—
2001–02	Colorado College	NCAA	40	14	8	22	50	—	—	—	—	—
2002–03	Albany River Rats	AHL	40	7	3	10	22	—	—	—	—	—
2003–04	Albany River Rats	AHL	51	4	5	9	26	—	—	—	—	—
2004–05	Colorado Eagles	CHL	46	13	16	29	60	16	3	9	12	26
2005–06	Colorado Eagles	CHL	29	5	17	22	59	12	6	4	10	0
2006–07	Colorado Eagles	CHL	63	29	35	64	106	3	0	3	3	17
2007–08	Colorado Eagles	CHL	6	3	2	5	6	—	—	—	—	—
AHL totals			91	11	8	19	48	—	—	—	—	—
CHL totals			144	50	70	120	231	31	9	16	25	43
