= Scott Matzka =

American ice hockey player

- Born: May 11, 1978 Port Huron, Michigan, U.S.
- Died: December 16, 2018 (aged 40) Kalamazoo, Michigan, U.S.
- Height: 6 ft 0 in (183 cm)
- Weight: 194 lb (88 kg; 13 st 12 lb)
- Position: Forward
- Shot: Right
- Played for: AHL; Grand Rapids Griffins; Cleveland Barons; ECHL; Atlantic City Boardwalk Bullies; Kalamazoo Wings; SM-liiga; Tappara; EIHL; Cardiff Devils
- NHL draft: Undrafted
- Playing career: 2001–2013

Scott Matzka (May 11, 1978 – December 16, 2018) was an American professional ice hockey player.

== Personal life ==
After retiring from hockey, Matzka revealed he was diagnosed with Amyotrophic lateral sclerosis (ALS). Following his diagnosis, he created an organization called "My Turn" to raise awareness and funds for ALS treatment. He died from ALS on December 16, 2018, at the age of 40.

== Career statistics ==
			Regular season					Playoffs
Season	Team	League	GP	G	A	Pts	PIM	GP	G	A	Pts	PIM
1994–95	Petrolia Jets	WOHL	38	32	33	65	18	—	—	—	—	—
1995–96	Omaha Lancers	USHL	45	12	27	39	111	—	—	—	—	—
1996–97	Omaha Lancers	USHL	53	38	40	78	112	8	8	6	14	14
1997–98	University of Michigan	NCAA	41	4	11	15	36	—	—	—	—	—
1998–99	University of Michigan	NCAA	40	7	12	19	30	—	—	—	—	—
1999–00	University of Michigan	NCAA	40	15	15	30	48	—	—	—	—	—
2000–01	University of Michigan	NCAA	45	9	18	27	100	—	—	—	—	—
2001–02	Grand Rapids Griffins	AHL	4	1	0	1	2	—	—	—	—	—
2001–02	Atlantic City Boardwalk Bullies	ECHL	63	17	35	52	97	12	4	7	11	14
2002–03	Cleveland Barons	AHL	14	1	6	7	10	—	—	—	—	—
2002–03	Atlantic City Boardwalk Bullies	ECHL	45	20	31	51	89	19	5	1	6	27
2003–04	ETC Crimmitschau	Germany2	47	16	25	41	180	—	—	—	—	—
2004–05	Berliner SC Preussen	Germany3	43	29	52	81	160	4	2	1	3	20
2005–06	Odense Bulldogs	Denmark	35	28	15	43	138	5	3	3	6	6
2006–07	Odense Bulldogs	Denmark	35	28	33	61	108	6	2	3	5	24
2007–08	Odense Bulldogs	Denmark	40	20	33	53	73	11	6	5	11	22
2008–09	EfB Ishockey	Denmark	44	23	43	66	141	4	1	3	4	10
2009–10	Örebro HK	Allsvenskan	37	11	16	27	44	—	—	—	—	—
2009–10	Tappara	Liiga	2	1	0	1	0	—	—	—	—	—
2009–10	Jokipojat	Mestis	7	2	7	9	4	9	5	7	12	6
2010–11	Cardiff Devils	EIHL	54	30	52	82	54	4	1	2	3	32
2011–12	Cardiff Devils	EIHL	48	22	33	55	97	4	1	4	5	2
2012–13	Kalamazoo Wings	ECHL	1	0	0	0	0	—	—	—	—	—
ECHL totals			109	37	66	103	186	31	9	8	17	41
Denmark totals			154	99	124	223	460	26	12	14	26	62
EIHL totals			102	52	85	137	151	8	2	6	8	34

== Awards and honors ==
Award	Year
EIHL First All-Star team	2010–11
