= Jeff Panzer (ice hockey) =

American ice hockey player

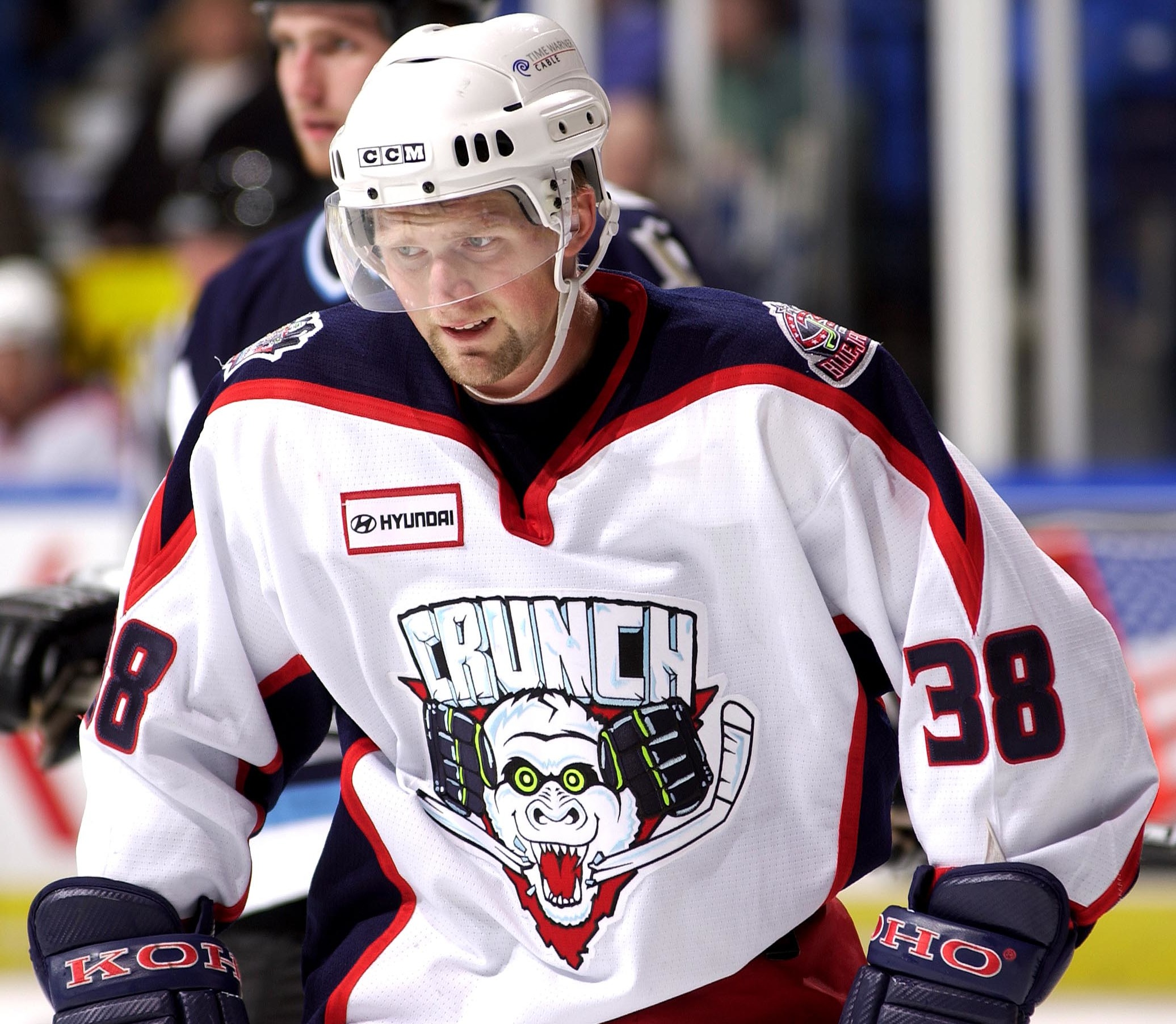
- Panzer with the Syracuse Crunch in 2004
- Born: April 7, 1978 (age 46); Grand Forks, North Dakota, U.S.
- Height: 5 ft 7 in (170 cm)
- Weight: 159 lb (72 kg; 11 st 5 lb)
- Position: Forward
- Shot: Left
- Played for: AHL; Worcester IceCats; Syracuse Crunch; Grand Rapids Griffins; NLA; Rapperswil-Jona Lakers; DEL; Düsseldorfer EG
- NHL draft: Undrafted
- Playing career: 2001–2008

Jeff Panzer (born April 7, 1978) is an American former professional ice hockey player.

Panzer was named the United States Hockey League (USHL) Player of the Year for the 1995–96 season. He attended the University of North Dakota from 1998 to 2001, where while playing for their men's ice hockey team, he was named an NCAA First Team All-American and was selected as a finalist for the Hobey Baker Award for both the 1999–2000 and 2000–01 seasons. Panzer was named the 2000–01 WCHA Player of the Year. In 2012, Panzer was named to the College Hockey Weekly "2000s All-Decade First Team".

Panzer went on to play nine seasons of professional hockey, including 281 games in the American Hockey League (AHL) with the Worcester IceCats, Syracuse Crunch and Grand Rapids Griffins.

== Awards and achievements ==
Honors	Year
USHL Player of the Year	1995–96
NCAA First Team All-American	1999–2000
Hobey Baker Award Finalist	1999–2000
NCAA First Team All-American	2000–01
WCHA Player of the Year	2000–01
Hobey Baker Award Finalist	2000–01

== Career statistics ==
			Regular season					Playoffs
Season	Team	League	GP	G	A	Pts	PIM	GP	G	A	Pts	PIM
1995–96	Fargo–Moorhead Bears	USHL	42	27	47	74	36	—	—	—	—	—
1996–97	Fargo–Moorhead Bears	USHL	49	30	40	70	52	6	3	7	10	0
1997–98	University of North Dakota	WCHA	37	14	23	37	18	—	—	—	—	—
1998–99	University of North Dakota	WCHA	39	21	26	47	14	—	—	—	—	—
1999–2000	University of North Dakota	WCHA	44	19	44	63	16	—	—	—	—	—
2000–01	University of North Dakota	WCHA	46	26	55	81	28	—	—	—	—	—
2000–01	Worcester IceCats	AHL	—	—	—	—	—	5	1	2	3	0
2001–02	Worcester IceCats	AHL	70	26	27	53	29	3	0	2	2	0
2002–03	Worcester IceCats	AHL	80	22	32	54	36	3	1	1	2	0
2003–04	Worcester IceCats	AHL	60	14	25	39	20	10	1	4	5	4
2004–05	Syracuse Crunch	AHL	51	8	10	18	19	—	—	—	—	—
2004–05	Grand Rapids Griffins	AHL	20	6	3	9	11	—	—	—	—	—
2005–06	Rapperswil–Jona Lakers	NLA	32	9	6	15	6	6	0	1	1	4
2006–07	DEG Metro Stars	DEL	42	9	13	22	12	9	5	3	8	0
2007–08	DEG Metro Stars	DEL	56	9	16	25	28	13	2	7	9	0
AHL totals			281	76	97	173	115	21	3	9	12	4
DEL totals			98	18	29	47	40	22	7	10	17	0

Awards and achievements
Preceded by Steven Reinprecht	WCHA Player of the Year; 2000–01	Succeeded by Mark Hartigan
Preceded by Steven Reinprecht	NCAA Ice Hockey Scoring Champion; 2000–01	Succeeded by John Pohl
