= Ice hockey at the 1990 Goodwill Games =

Tournament details
- Host country: United States
- Dates: July 27 - August 5
- Teams: 8

Final positions
- Champions: Soviet Union
- Runners-up: United States
- Third place: Canada
- Fourth place: Sweden

Tournament statistics
- Games played: 20

At the 1990 Goodwill Games, the Ice hockey events were held in Kennewick and Tacoma, Washington, United States between July and August 1990.

Prior to the first game played by the Soviet Union national ice hockey team, star player Sergei Fedorov defected and signed a five-year contract with the Detroit Red Wings. Soviet administrator Yuri Korolev insisted that his player was stolen by premeditated actions, rather than defecting on his own "under normal circumstances". He said that "having this happen on the eve of the goodwill games, is like a spoon of tar in a barrel of honey", also stating that only players aged 28 and older are allowed by the Soviet government to join NHL teams. With the Soviet Union crumbling, Fedorov was asked to join the Soviet team for the 1991 Canada Cup just one year after his defection, which he accepted to represent his country.

== Preliminary round ==
=== Group A ===
Pos	Team	Pld	W	D	L	GF	GA	GD	Pts
1	Soviet Union	3	3	0	0	17	3	+14	6
2	United States	3	2	0	1	17	14	+3	4
3	Switzerland	3	1	0	2	6	12	−6	2
4	West Germany	3	0	0	3	4	15	−11	0

28 July	West Germany	0-3 (0-1, 0-1, 0-1)	Soviet Union	Tri-Cities Coliseum, Kennewick

28 July	United States	7-1 (3-1, 2-0, 2-0)	Switzerland	Tri-Cities Coliseum, Kennewick

30 July	West Germany	1-3 (0-0, 0-0, 1-3)	Switzerland	Tri-Cities Coliseum, Kennewick

30 July	United States	1-10 (0-4, 0-0, 1-6)	Soviet Union	Tri-Cities Coliseum, Kennewick

1 August	United States	9-3 (2-1, 3-1, 4-1)	West Germany	Tri-Cities Coliseum, Kennewick

1 August	Soviet Union	4-2 (1-0, 0-1, 3-1)	Switzerland	Tri-Cities Coliseum, Kennewick

=== Group B ===
Pos	Team	Pld	W	D	L	GF	GA	GD	Pts
1	Canada	3	3	0	0	13	10	+3	6
2	Sweden	3	2	0	1	15	9	+6	4
3	Finland	3	1	0	2	10	15	−5	2
4	Czechoslovakia	3	0	0	3	8	12	−4	0

27 July	Sweden	5-4 (2-3, 1-0, 2-1)	Czechoslovakia	Tri-Cities Coliseum, Kennewick

27 July	Canada	6-5 (3-1, 2-2, 1-2)	Finland	Tri-Cities Coliseum, Kennewick

29 July	Finland	4-2 (0-1, 3-0, 1-1)	Czechoslovakia	Tri-Cities Coliseum, Kennewick

29 July	Canada	4-3 (3-0, 1-0, 0-3)	Sweden	Tri-Cities Coliseum, Kennewick

31 July	Canada	3-2 (1-1, 1-0, 1-1)	Czechoslovakia	Tri-Cities Coliseum, Kennewick

31 July	Sweden	7-1 (2-0, 4-1, 1-0)	Finland	Tri-Cities Coliseum, Kennewick

== Consolation Round ==
2 August	West Germany	1-3 (0-1, 1-1, 0-2)	Finland	Tri-Cities Coliseum, Kennewick

2 August	Switzerland	4-8 (2-4, 1-3, 1-1)	Czechoslovakia	Tri-Cities Coliseum, Kennewick

=== 7th Place Match ===
3 August	West Germany	4-2 (2-1, 1-1, 1-0)	Switzerland	Tri-Cities Coliseum, Kennewick

=== 5th Place Match ===
3 August	Czechoslovakia	8-4 (3-1, 1-0, 4-3)	Finland	Tri-Cities Coliseum, Kennewick

== Playoff round ==
=== Semifinals ===
4 August	Soviet Union	4-1 (1-0, 0-1, 3-0)	Sweden	Tacoma Dome, Tacoma

4 August	Canada	4-5 GWS (2-1, 1-2, 1-1, 0-0)	United States	Tacoma Dome, Tacoma

=== Bronze medal game ===
5 August	Canada	6-1 (2-0, 3-1, 1-0, 0-0)	Sweden	Tacoma Dome, Tacoma

=== Gold medal game ===
5 August	Soviet Union	4-3 GWS (2-0, 1-3, 1-0, 0-0)	United States	Tacoma Dome, Tacoma

== Final ranking ==
1st place, gold medalist(s)	Soviet Union
2nd place, silver medalist(s)	United States
3rd place, bronze medalist(s)	Canada
4	Sweden
5	Czechoslovakia
6	Finland
7	West Germany
8	Switzerland

== See also ==
- 1990 Men's World Ice Hockey Championships
