= Lincoln Stars =

- City: Lincoln, Nebraska
- League: USHL
- Conference: Western
- Founded: 1996
- Home arena: Ice Box
- Colors: Blue, black, white
- Owner: Alberto Fernandez
- General manager: Nick Fabrizio
- Head coach: Artt Brey
- Website: www.lincolnstars.com

Franchise history
- 1996–present: Lincoln Stars

Championships
- Regular season titles: 4 Anderson Cups (1999–00, 2000–01, 2002–03, 2024–25)
- Playoff championships: 2 Clark Cups (1997 and 2003)

The Lincoln Stars are a junior ice hockey team playing in the United States Hockey League (USHL). The Stars' home ice is the Ice Box on the former Nebraska State Fair grounds and adjacent to the University of Nebraska–Lincoln.

== History ==
With prompting of Lincoln realtor Mark Claydon, who spear-headed an effort to build the city's first and only indoor ice arena, the Stars came to Lincoln in 1996. Led by Derek Reynolds and future NHL player Josh Langfeld, the Stars posted a 40–13–1 regular season record, the best expansion season in USHL history. The Stars continued their domination through the playoffs, losing just two playoff games en route to winning the Clark Cup. Every game was sold out at the 4,231-seat Ice Box. The success continued through the following seasons; the Stars sold out every home game until early 2002. In 1998, the Ice Box was expanded to 5,010 seats in preparation for the USA Hockey National Championships (Junior A). The capacity was later reduced to 4,610, as some bleacher seats were converted to club seating.

The Stars made the playoffs their first seven seasons and won a second Clark Cup in 2003. Led by players such as Danny Irmen, the Stars defeated the rival Omaha Lancers in the Clark Cup finals. After the 2003 championship, they missed the playoffs for the first time and attendance started to steadily decrease. From the 2003–04 to 2012–13 seasons, the team qualified for the playoffs eight times and advanced past the second round once.

In 2013, the Stars were sold to Chicago-based businessman Ryan Schiff. The team failed to make the playoffs seven out of the next nine completed seasons; the 2019–20 USHL season was curtailed by the onset of the COVID-19 pandemic.

On June 3, 2021, it was announced the team had been sold to Alberto Fernandez, the owner of both the North American Hockey League's North Iowa Bulls, a franchise that he had owned as the Amarillo Bulls since 2019, and the North American 3 Hockey League's Mason City Toros, a team that used to be called the North Iowa Bulls and had won the league championship four times. Fernandez then brought over the Amarillo Bulls' head coach, Rocky Russo, to lead the Stars. After five seasons, the Stars appointed Artt Brey as head coach.

== Season records ==
Season	GP	W	L	T	OTL	SOL	Pts	Finish	Playoffs
1996–97	54	40	13	0	1	—	81	2nd, South	Won quarterfinals, 4–1 vs. Rochester Mustangs; Won semifinals, 4–1 vs. Omaha Lancers; Won Clark Cup finals, 4–0 vs. Green Bay Gamblers
1997–98	56	38	14	—	3	1	77	3rd, South	Won quarterfinals, 4–1 vs. Sioux City Musketeers; Lost semifinals, 0–4 vs. Des Moines Buccaneers
1998–99	56	29	20	—	7	—	65	3rd, West	Won quarterfinals, 3–2 vs. Sioux City Musketeers; Lost semifinals, 2–3 vs. Des Moines Buccaneers
1999–00	58	41	16	—	—	1	83	1st, USHL	Won quarterfinals, 3–2 vs. Sioux City Musketeers; Lost semifinals, 2–3 vs. Twin Cities Vulcans
2000–01	56	43	7	—	6	—	92	1st, USHL	Won quarterfinals, 3–0 vs. Sioux City Musketeers; Won semifinals, 3–0 vs. Tri-City Storm; Lost Clark Cup finals, 2–3 vs. Omaha Lancers
2001–02	61	43	15	—	3	—	89	2nd, West	Lost quarterfinals, 1–3 vs. Cedar Rapids RoughRiders
2002–03	60	37	14	—	3	6	83	1st, USHL	Won quarterfinals, 3–0 vs. Tri-City Storm; Won semifinals, 3–0 vs. Cedar Rapids RoughRiders; Won Clark Cup finals, 3–1 vs. River City Lancers
2003–04	60	27	29	—	4	0	58	5th, West	did not qualify
2004–05	60	37	17	—	3	3	80	3rd, West	Lost quarterfinals, 1–3 vs. Sioux City Musketeers
2005–06	60	34	20	—	4	2	74	2nd, West	Won quarterfinals, 3–2 vs. Omaha Lancers; Lost semifinals, 1–3 vs. Sioux Falls Stampede
2006–07	60	37	20	—	1	2	77	3rd, West	Lost qualifying round, 0–4 vs. Sioux Falls Stampede
2007–08	60	31	22	—	4	3	69	3rd, West	Won quarterfinals, 3–0 vs. Sioux Falls Stampede; Lost semifinals, 2–3 vs. Omaha Lancers
2008–09	60	37	17	—	3	3	80	1st, West	Won quarterfinals, 3–1 vs. Sioux Falls Stampede; Lost semifinals, 0–3 vs. Fargo Force
2009–10	60	16	36	—	2	6	40	7th, West	did not qualify
2010–11	60	33	22	—	2	3	40	5th, West	Lost conference quarterfinals, 0–2 vs. Fargo Force
2011–12	60	38	18	—	2	2	80	1st, West	Won conference semifinals, 3–1 vs. Fargo Force; Lost conference finals, 1–3 vs. Waterloo Black Hawks
2012–13	64	39	22	—	0	3	81	4th, West	Lost conference semifinals, 2–3 vs. Sioux Falls Stampede
2013–14	60	24	28	—	2	6	56	5th, West	did not qualify
2014–15	60	18	37	—	1	4	41	8th, West	did not qualify
2015–16	60	33	24	—	2	1	69	2nd, West	Lost conference semifinals, 1–3 vs. Waterloo Black Hawks
2016–17	60	32	22	—	5	1	70	5th, West	did not qualify
2017–18	60	35	23	—	1	1	72	5th, West	Won first round, 2–1 vs. Sioux Falls Stampede; Lost conference semifinals, 1–3 vs. Waterloo Black Hawks
2018–19	62	12	42	—	4	4	32	8th, West	did not qualify
2019–20	48	23	20	—	3	2	51	5th, West	Season cancelled due to the COVID-19 pandemic
2020–21	54	22	28	—	3	1	48	6th, West	did not qualify
2022-23	62	37	21	—	3	1	78	3rd, West	Won first round, 2-0 vs.Des Moines Buccaneers; Won conference semifinals, 2-1 vs. Waterloo Black Hawks; Lost conference finals, 3-1 vs. Fargo Force
2023–24	62	27	30	—	3	2	59	6th, West	Won first round, 2-0 vs.Waterloo Black Hawks; Lost conference semifinals, 3-0 vs. Sioux City Musketeers
2024–25	62	44	15	—	3	0	91	1st, USHL	Won conference semifinals, 3-0 vs.Sioux City Musketeers
Totals	1717	964	660	0	81	63	—		

== Coaches ==
- Steve Johnson (1996–2007)
- Jim McGroarty (2007–2010, 2013–2014)
- Chad Johnson (2010–2013)
- Mick Berge (interim, 2014)
- Chris Hartsburg (2014–2017)
- Cody Chupp (2017–2020)
- Chris Michael (2020–2021)
- Rocky Russo (2021–2026)
- Artt Brey (2026–present)

== Alumni ==
Notable Stars alumni include:

- David Backes
- Brandon Bochenski
- Jared Boll
- Brandon Bollig
- Erik Condra
- Paul Cotter
- Noah Laba
- Josh Langfeld
- Evan Rankin
- Andy Schneider
