= 1999–2000 USHL season =

- League: United States Hockey League
- Sport: Ice hockey
- Duration: Regular season September 1999 – March 2000; Postseason; March 28 – April 27, 2000
- Games: 58
- Teams: 14

Regular season
- Anderson Cup: Lincoln Stars

Clark Cup Playoffs
- Finals champions: Green Bay Gamblers
- Runners-up: Twin City Vulcans

USHL seasons
- ← 1998–99 2000–01 →

The 1999–2000 USHL season was the 21st season of the United States Hockey League as an all-junior league. The regular season began in September 1999 and concluded in March 2000. The Lincoln Stars won the Anderson Cup as regular season champions. The Green Bay Gamblers defeated the Twin City Vulcans 4 games to 1 for the Clark Cup.

== Member changes ==
- The Sioux Falls Stampede joined the league as an expansion franchise.
- The North Iowa Huskies relocated and became the Cedar Rapids RoughRiders.

== Regular season ==
Final standings

Note: GP = Games played; W = Wins; L = Losses; SOL = Shootout losses; GF = Goals for; GA = Goals against; PTS = Points; x = clinched playoff berth; y = clinched division title; z = clinched league title

=== Eastern Conference ===
Team	GP	W	L	SOL	Pts	GF	GA
y – USNTDP	58	39	16	3	81	216	151
x – Green Bay Gamblers	58	35	18	5	75	232	174
x – Waterloo Black Hawks	58	28	26	4	60	186	213
Rochester Mustangs	58	26	28	4	56	155	178
Cedar Rapids RoughRiders	58	19	34	5	43	156	220
Thunder Bay Flyers	58	18	39	1	37	164	254
Dubuque Fighting Saints	58	16	39	3	35	141	230

=== Western Conference ===
Team	GP	W	L	SOL	Pts	GF	GA
xyz – Lincoln Stars	58	41	16	1	83	218	139
x – Sioux Falls Stampede	58	37	17	4	78	239	179
x – Omaha Lancers	58	36	18	4	76	168	151
x – Des Moines Buccaneers	58	35	20	3	73	220	196
x – Twin City Vulcans	58	31	19	8	70	203	174
x – Sioux City Musketeers	58	27	26	5	59	170	162
Fargo-Moorhead Ice Sharks	58	18	34	6	42	181	228

Note: The USNTDP was unavailable for postseason play due to participating in the NAHL playoffs.

=== Statistics ===
==== Scoring leaders ====
The following players led the league in regular season points at the completion of all regular season games.

Player	Team	GP	G	A	Pts	PIM
Peter Sejna	Des Moines Buccaneers	58	41	53	94	36
Aaron Smith	Green Bay Gamblers	55	33	42	75	93
John Eichelberger	Green Bay Gamblers	49	19	50	69	58
R. J. Umberger	USNTDP	57	33	35	68	20
Rick Gorman	Sioux Falls Stampede	55	25	43	68	166
Jared Hanowski	Sioux Falls Stampede	57	22	45	67	88
Troy Riddle	Des Moines Buccaneers	53	36	30	66	95
Keith Dore	Lincoln Stars	57	24	41	65	44
Alex Kim	Des Moines Buccaneers	57	20	42	62	67
Dwight Hirst	Fargo-Moorhead Ice Sharks	56	32	29	61	24
Paul Caponigri	Omaha Lancers	57	28	33	61	122

==== Leading goaltenders ====
Minimum 1/3 of team's minutes played.
Note: GP = Games played; Mins = Minutes played; W = Wins; L = Losses; OTL = Overtime losses; SO = Shutouts; GAA = Goals against average; SV% = Save percentage

Player	Team	GP	Mins	W	L	OTL	SO	GA	SV	SV%	GAA
Dan Ellis	Omaha Lancers	55	3274	34	16	4	11	123	1,517	.925	2.25
Wayne Russell	Lincoln Stars	48	2838	32	14	1	5	108	1,210	.918	2.28
Adam Coole	Rochester Mustangs	45	2581	22	17	4	4	113	1,338	.922	2.63
Mike Betz	Sioux City Musketeers	50	2918	24	22	3	6	132	1,223	.903	2.71
Adam Berkhoel	Twin City Vulcans	49	2848	25	15	7	5	129	1,544	.923	2.72

== Clark Cup playoffs ==
The regular season division champions received the top two seeds.
Teams were reseeded after the quarterfinal round.

Quarterfinal (Best-of-5)
W1	Lincoln Stars	3*	3*	3	3	3
8	Sioux City Musketeers	2	2	4	6	2
2	Sioux Falls Stampede	2	2	2	-	-
7	Twin City Vulcans	3	3*	3	-	-
3	Omaha Lancers	1	2	2	1	-
6	Des Moines Buccaneers	2	4	1	4	-
4	Green Bay Gamblers	0	5	5	4*	-
5	Waterloo Black Hawks	4	0	2	3	-

Semifinal (Best-of-5)
W1	Lincoln Stars	4	8	3	2	3
7	Twin City Vulcans	1	1	5	5	7
4	Green Bay Gamblers	4*	4	0	1	6
6	Des Moines Buccaneers	3	2	3	6	2

Championship (Best-of-7)
7	Twin City Vulcans	2	3	3	1	1	-	-
4	Green Bay Gamblers	4	6	2	5	2*	-	-

Note: * denotes overtime period(s)

== Awards ==
Award	Recipient	Team
Player of the Year	Dan Ellis	Omaha Lancers
Forward of the Year	Peter Sejna	Des Moines Buccaneers
Defenseman of the Year	Jeff Finger	Green Bay Gamblers
Goaltender of the Year	Dan Ellis	Omaha Lancers
Rookie of the Year	Troy Riddle	Des Moines Buccaneers
Coach of the Year	Steve Johnson	Lincoln Stars
General Manager of the Year	Bob Motzko	Sioux Falls Stampede
