= 1996–97 USHL season =

- League: United States Hockey League
- Sport: Ice hockey
- Duration: Regular season September 1996 – March 1997; Postseason; March 19 – April 22, 1997
- Games: 54
- Teams: 12

Regular season
- Anderson Cup: Green Bay Gamblers
- Season MVP: Karl Goehring (Fargo-Moorhead Ice Sharks)
- Top scorer: Mike Lephart (Omaha Lancers)

Playoffs
- Finals champions: Lincoln Stars
- Runners-up: Green Bay Gamblers

USHL seasons
- ← 1995–96 1997–98 →

The 1996–97 USHL season was the 18th season of the United States Hockey League as an all-junior league. The regular season began in September 1996 and concluded in March 1997. The Green Bay Gamblers won the Anderson Cup as regular season champions. The Lincoln Stars also defeated the Green Bay Gamblers 4 games to 0 for the Clark Cup.

== Member changes ==
- The previous season, the Fargo-Moorhead Bears failed to pay their league dues after the regular season and were immediately suspended from play. Afterwards, the team folded and the Fargo-Moorhead Ice Sharks joined as an expansion team in their place.
- The Lincoln Stars also joined the league as an expansion franchise.

== Regular season ==
Final standings

Note: GP = Games played; W = Wins; L = Losses; OTL = Overtime losses; GF = Goals for; GA = Goals against; PTS = Points; x = clinched playoff berth; y = clinched division title; z = clinched league title

=== North Division ===
Team	GP	W	L	OTL	Pts	GF	GA
xyz – Green Bay Gamblers	54	41	11	2	84	260	187
x – Rochester Mustangs	54	28	21	5	61	217	193
x – North Iowa Huskies	54	28	21	5	61	210	190
x – Twin City Vulcans	54	25	26	3	53	190	211
x – Fargo-Moorhead Ice Sharks	54	24	28	2	50	160	154
Thunder Bay Flyers	54	19	33	2	40	186	251

=== South Division ===
Team	GP	W	L	OTL	Pts	GF	GA
xy – Omaha Lancers	54	40	12	2	82	252	152
x – Lincoln Stars	54	40	13	1	81	244	168
x – Des Moines Buccaneers	54	37	13	4	78	245	168
Dubuque Fighting Saints	54	17	34	3	37	157	211
Waterloo Black Hawks	54	16	34	4	36	182	273
Sioux City Musketeers	54	9	43	2	20	162	307

=== Statistics ===
==== Scoring leaders ====
The following players led the league in regular season points at the completion of all regular season games.

Player	Team	GP	G	A	Pts	PIM
Mike Lephart	Omaha Lancers	54	40	50	90	76
Jeff Turner	Rochester Mustangs	54	32	56	88	42
Kevin Granato	Green Bay Gamblers	54	41	41	82	72
Kevin Swider	Omaha Lancers	52	37	44	81	16
Scott Matzka	Omaha Lancers	53	38	40	78	112
Andrew Tortorella	Waterloo/Omaha	49	22	56	78	113
Derek Robertson	Des Moines Buccaneers	54	31	43	73	26
Chad Stauffacher	Green Bay Gamblers	51	35	36	71	316
Jeff Panzer	Fargo-Moorhead Ice Sharks	49	30	40	70	52
Jason Cupp	Green Bay Gamblers	54	17	50	67	47

==== Leading goaltenders ====
Minimum 1000 minutes played.
Note: GP = Games played; Mins = Minutes played; W = Wins; L = Losses; OTL = Overtime losses; SO = Shutouts; GAA = Goals against average; SV% = Save percentage

Player	Team	GP	Mins	W	L	OTL	SO	GA	SV	SV%	GAA
Karl Goehring	Fargo-Moorhead Ice Sharks	32	1909	13	18	1	4	79	954	.924	2.48
Jayme Platt	Des Moines Buccaneers	22	1224	15	4	2	2	51	628	.925	2.50
Dean Weasler	Rochester Mustangs	37	2159	20	12	2	3	99	962	.907	2.75
Graham Melanson	Omaha Lancers	29	1565	19	5	1	4	74	600	.890	2.84
Jason Braun	Lincoln Stars	40	2249	28	11	1	2	109	955	.898	2.91

== Clark Cup playoffs ==
The regular season division champions received the top two seeds.
Teams were reseeded after the quarterfinal round.

Quarterfinal (Best-of-7)
S1	Green Bay Gamblers	0	6	7	4	2	3	-
8	Fargo-Moorhead Ice Sharks	3	3	4	3	4	2	-
N1	Omaha Lancers	5	7	2	2	6	-	-
7	Twin City Vulcans	0	5	0	3*	4	-	-
3	Lincoln Stars	3	4	2	3	9	-	-
6	Rochester Mustangs	2	1	5	2	2	-	-
4	Des Moines Buccaneers	4	1	4	2	2	-	-
5	North Iowa Huskies	7	0	5	5	3	-	-

Semifinal (Best-of-7)
S1	Green Bay Gamblers	5	5	4	5	5	5	1
5	North Iowa Huskies	7	2	5*	6	4	2	0
N1	Omaha Lancers	3	1	4	0	5	-	-
3	Lincoln Stars	5	5	1	4	6*	-	-

Championship (Best-of-7)
S1	Green Bay Gamblers	3	3	0	2	-	-	-
3	Lincoln Stars	5	4	7	3	-	-	-

Note: * denotes overtime period(s)

== Awards ==
Award	Recipient	Team
Player of the Year	Karl Goehring	Fargo-Moorhead Ice Sharks
Forward of the Year	Mike Lephart	Omaha Lancers
Defenseman of the Year	Doug Schmidt	Waterloo Black Hawks
Goaltender of the Year	Karl Goehring	Fargo-Moorhead Ice Sharks
Rookie of the Year	Karl Goehring	Fargo-Moorhead Ice Sharks
Coach of the Year	Mike Hastings	Omaha Lancers
General Manager of the Year	Mike Hastings	Omaha Lancers
