= 1998–99 USHL season =

- League: United States Hockey League
- Sport: Ice hockey
- Duration: Regular season September 1998 – March 1999; Postseason; March 24 – April 23, 1999
- Games: 56
- Teams: 13

Regular season
- Anderson Cup: Des Moines Buccaneers

Clark Cup Playoffs
- Finals champions: Des Moines Buccaneers
- Runners-up: Green Bay Gamblers

USHL seasons
- ← 1997–98 1999–2000 →

The 1998–99 USHL season was the 20th season of the United States Hockey League as an all-junior league. The regular season began in September 1998 and concluded in March 1999. The Des Moines Buccaneers won the Anderson Cup as regular season champions. The Des Moines Buccaneers also defeated the Omaha Lancers 4 games to 2 for the Clark Cup.

== Member changes ==
- The USNTDP played a full league schedule for the first time but was unavailable for postseason play due to participating in the NAHL playoffs.

== Regular season ==
Final standings

Note: GP = Games played; W = Wins; L = Losses; OTL = Overtime losses; GF = Goals for; GA = Goals against; PTS = Points; x = clinched playoff berth; y = clinched division title; z = clinched league title

=== Central Division ===
Team	GP	W	L	OTL	Pts	GF	GA
xyz – Des Moines Buccaneers	56	48	7	1	97	304	133
x – Thunder Bay Flyers	56	19	30	7	45	164	247
x – Twin City Vulcans	56	22	34	0	44	183	246
Rochester Mustangs	56	20	32	4	44	170	206
North Iowa Huskies	56	18	36	2	38	150	221

=== East Division ===
Team	GP	W	L	SOL	Pts	GF	GA
xy – Green Bay Gamblers	56	41	11	4	86	213	143
USNTDP	56	38	15	3	79	211	133
x – Dubuque Fighting Saints	56	22	32	2	46	164	217
Waterloo Black Hawks	56	16	37	3	35	167	245

=== West Division ===
Team	GP	W	L	SOL	Pts	GF	GA
xy – Omaha Lancers	56	43	13	0	86	234	130
x – Sioux City Musketeers	56	34	19	3	71	196	148
x – Lincoln Stars	56	29	20	7	65	198	174
Fargo-Moorhead Ice Sharks	56	14	41	1	29	164	275

Note: The USNTDP was unavailable for postseason play due to participating in the NAHL playoffs.

=== Statistics ===
==== Scoring leaders ====
The following players led the league in regular season points at the completion of all regular season games.

Player	Team	GP	G	A	Pts	PIM
Peter Fregoe	Des Moines Buccaneers	56	46	57	103	43
Ruslan Fedotenko	Sioux City Musketeers	55	43	34	77	139
Tyler Palmiscno	Sioux City Musketeers	56	13	57	70	18
Peter Sejna	Des Moines Buccaneers	52	40	23	63	26
Noah Clarke	Des Moines Buccaneers	52	31	32	63	47
Jed Ortmeyer	Omaha Lancers	52	23	36	59	81
Andy Hilbert	USNTDP	46	23	35	58	140
Chris Fournier	Lincoln Stars	54	23	33	56	54
B. J. Abel	Rochester Mustangs	50	31	24	55	52
Mike Perpich	Green Bay Gamblers	56	23	32	55	64
Tom Preissing	Green Bay Gamblers	53	18	37	55	40

==== Leading goaltenders ====
Minimum 1000 minutes played.
Note: GP = Games played; Mins = Minutes played; W = Wins; L = Losses; OTL = Overtime losses; SO = Shutouts; GAA = Goals against average; SV% = Save percentage

Player	Team	GP	Mins	W	L	OTL	SO	GA	SV	SV%	GAA
Tony Zasowski	Omaha Lancers	47	2786	35	11	0	5	91	972	.914	1.96
Matt Carney	Des Moines Buccaneers	38	2177	31	5	1	4	76	888	.921	2.10
Chris Gartman	USNTDP	17	1007	11	3	2	1	36	375	.922	2.15
Rob Anderson	Green Bay Gamblers	44	2607	32	8	3	5	100	1,143	.920	2.30
Rick DiPietro	USNTDP	30	1733	22	6	1	3	67	656	.907	2.32

== Clark Cup playoffs ==
The regular season division champions received the top three seeds.
Teams were reseeded after the quarterfinal round.

Quarterfinal (Best-of-5)
C1	Des Moines Buccaneers	6	8	5*	-	-
8	Twin City Vulcans	1	5	4	-	-
E1	Green Bay Gamblers	4	5	6	-	-
7	Thunder Bay Flyers	2	4	3	-	-
W1	Omaha Lancers	5	10	4	-	-
6	Dubuque Fighting Saints	2	0	2	-	-
4	Lincoln Stars	4	4	2	0	3*
5	Sioux City Musketeers	5*	1	0	2	2

Semifinal (Best-of-5)
C1	Des Moines Buccaneers	3*	1	6	4	4
4	Lincoln Stars	2	2	2	5*	2
E1	Green Bay Gamblers	1	1	3	-	-
W1	Omaha Lancers	2	2	4*	-	-

Championship (Best-of-7)
C1	Des Moines Buccaneers	0	5	3	2	5	5	-
W1	Omaha Lancers	2	3	3	2	4	0	-

Note: * denotes overtime period(s)

== Awards ==
Award	Recipient	Team
Player of the Year	Pete Fregoe	Des Moines Buccaneers
Forward of the Year	Pete Fregoe	Des Moines Buccaneers
Defenseman of the Year	Tom Preissing	Green Bay Gamblers
Goaltender of the Year	Tony Zasowski	Omaha Lancers
Rookie of the Year	Tyler Palmiscno	Sioux City Musketeers
Coach of the Year	Mark Osiecki	Green Bay Gamblers
General Manager of the Year	Scott Owens	Des Moines Buccaneers
