= 1995–96 USHL season =

- League: United States Hockey League
- Sport: Ice hockey
- Duration: Regular season September 1995 – March 1996; Postseason; March – April 1996
- Games: 46
- Teams: 11

Regular season
- Anderson Cup: Green Bay Gamblers

Clark Cup Playoffs
- Finals champions: Green Bay Gamblers
- Runners-up: Rochester Mustangs

USHL seasons
- ← 1994–95 1996–97 →

The 1995–96 USHL season was the 17th season of the United States Hockey League as an all-junior league. The regular season began in September 1995 and concluded in March 1996. The Green Bay Gamblers won the Anderson Cup as regular season champions. The Green Bay Gamblers also defeated the Rochester Mustangs 4 games to 3 for the Clark Cup.

== Member changes ==
- The Wisconsin Capitols folded after the previous season. Their place in the league was taken by an expansion franchise, the Fargo-Moorhead Bears.
- The St. Paul Vulcans rebranded as the Twin City Vulcans.

== Regular season ==
Final standings

Note: GP = Games played; W = Wins; L = Losses; T = Ties; OTL = Overtime losses; GF = Goals for; GA = Goals against; PTS = Points; x = clinched playoff berth; y = clinched league title

Team	GP	W	L	T	OTL	Pts	GF	GA
xy – Green Bay Gamblers	46	32	11	3	0	67	219	137
x – Omaha Lancers	46	30	10	2	4	66	195	132
Fargo-Moorhead Bears	46	27	17	1	1	56	182	146
x – North Iowa Huskies	46	26	17	1	2	55	184	181
x – Rochester Mustangs	46	24	20	1	1	50	196	174
x – Waterloo Black Hawks	46	21	19	2	4	48	157	176
x – Des Moines Buccaneers	46	21	21	2	2	46	177	174
x – Twin City Vulcans	46	18	21	3	4	43	169	184
x – Sioux City Musketeers	46	17	24	1	4	39	150	190
Dubuque Fighting Saints	46	15	28	1	2	33	145	214
Thunder Bay Flyers	46	13	29	1	3	30	136	202

Note: The Fargo-Moorhead Bears failed to pay league dues and were suspended at the end of the regular season. As a result, they were excluded from postseason play.

=== Statistics ===
==== Scoring leaders ====
The following players led the league in regular season points at the completion of all regular season games.

Player	Team	GP	G	A	Pts	PIM
Jeff Panzer	Fargo-Moorhead Bears	42	27	47	74	36
Mike Rucinski	North Iowa Huskies	44	24	42	66	61
Andrew Tortorella	Waterloo Black Hawks	41	18	47	65	44
Matt Noga	North Iowa Huskies	39	28	36	64	101
Klage Kaebel	Des Moines Buccaneers	46	32	31	63	28
Chad Stauffacher	Green Bay Gamblers	46	34	27	61	213
Jesse Rooney	Fargo-Moorhead Bears	46	33	27	60	88
Aaron Fox	Green Bay Gamblers	46	23	36	59	20
Brian McDonald	Green Bay Gamblers	46	24	34	58	57
Jerry Keefe	Omaha Lancers	46	18	40	58	40

== Clark Cup playoffs ==
The Fargo-Moorhead Bears were barred form postseason play, however, because the first round matches had already been set, the Sioux City Musketeers were inserted as the 3-seed in spite of their record.
Teams were reseeded after the quarterfinal round based upon their regular season records.

Quarterfinal (Best-of-7)
1	Green Bay Gamblers	4
8	Twin City Vulcans	3
2	Omaha Lancers	2
7	Des Moines Buccaneers	4
3	Sioux City Musketeers	4
6	Waterloo Black Hawks	1
4	North Iowa Huskies	2
5	Rochester Mustangs	4

Semifinal (Best-of-7)
1	Green Bay Gamblers	4
3	Sioux City Musketeers	0
5	Rochester Mustangs	4
7	Des Moines Buccaneers	1

Championship (Best-of-7)
1	Green Bay Gamblers	4
5	Rochester Mustangs	3

Note: * denotes overtime period(s)

== Awards ==
Award	Recipient	Team
Player of the Year	Jeff Panzer	Fargo-Moorhead Bears
Player of the Year	Matt Noga	North Iowa Huskies
Forward of the Year	Jeff Panzer	Fargo-Moorhead Bears
Defenseman of the Year	Josh DeWolf	Twin City Vulcans
Defenseman of the Year	Dan Peters	Omaha Lancers
Goaltender of the Year	Mike Correia	Omaha Lancers
Coach of the Year	Steve Johnson	Fargo-Moorhead Bears
