= Fargo–Moorhead Bears =

Defunct junior ice hockey team in Minnesota, US

Fargo-Moorhead Bears
- City: Moorhead, Minnesota
- League: United States Hockey League
- Founded: 1995
- Folded: 1996
- Colours: Black, gray, white
- Head coach: Steve Johnson

The Fargo-Moorhead Bears were a Tier 1 junior ice hockey team that played a single season in the United States Hockey League (USHL) in 1995-96.

== History ==
The Bears began play in the 1995–96, following the folding of the Wisconsin Capitols franchise, leaving the USHL with 11 teams for the season. Fargo-Moorhead finished their only season in operation in third place of the 11-team league.

The Fargo-Moorhead Bears ceased operation after the 1995-96 USHL season, when their team owner failed to pay the league's expansion fee. The Bears were immediately replaced by the Fargo-Moorhead Ice Sharks, an expansion team who retained the Bears' players in the 1996–97 season.
