= 1997–98 USHL season =

- League: United States Hockey League
- Sport: Ice hockey
- Duration: Regular season September 1997 – March 1998; Postseason; March 17 – April 21, 1998
- Games: 56, 24
- Teams: 13

Regular season
- Anderson Cup: Des Moines Buccaneers
- Season MVP: Nate DiCasmirro (North Iowa Huskies)
- Top scorer: Tyler Arnason (Fargo-Moorhead Ice Sharks)

Clark Cup Playoffs
- Clark Cup Playoffs MVP: Nate Mauer (Lancers)
- Finals champions: Omaha Lancers
- Runners-up: Des Moines Buccaneers

USHL seasons
- ← 1996–97 1998–99 →

The 1997–98 USHL season was the 19th season of the United States Hockey League as an all-junior league. The regular season began in September 1997 and concluded in March 1998. The Des Moines Buccaneers won the Anderson Cup as regular season champions. The Omaha Lancers defeated the Des Moines Buccaneers 4 games to 0 for the Clark Cup.

== Member changes ==
- The USNTDP joined the league as an affiliate member.

== Regular season ==
Final standings

Note: GP = Games played; W = Wins; L = Losses; OTL = Overtime losses; GF = Goals for; GA = Goals against; PTS = Points; x = clinched playoff berth; y = clinched division title; z = clinched league title

=== North Division ===
Team	GP	W	L	OTL	Pts	GF	GA
xy – North Iowa Huskies	56	36	14	6	78	206	136
x – Fargo-Moorhead Ice Sharks	56	26	23	7	59	207	208
x – Green Bay Gamblers	56	23	28	5	51	157	183
Rochester Mustangs	56	21	31	4	46	148	180
Thunder Bay Flyers	56	20	31	5	45	165	227
Twin City Vulcans	56	19	32	5	43	162	242

=== South Division ===
Team	GP	W	L	SOL	Pts	GF	GA
xyz – Des Moines Buccaneers	56	40	14	2	82	226	148
x – Omaha Lancers	56	39	15	2	80	221	144
x – Lincoln Stars	56	38	17	1	77	229	160
x – Sioux City Musketeers	56	32	21	3	67	195	155
x – Waterloo Black Hawks	56	25	29	2	52	159	200
Dubuque Fighting Saints	56	19	36	1	39	159	238

=== USNTDP ===
Team	GP	W	L	SOL	Pts	GF	GA
USNTDP	24	10	10	4	24	77	90

=== Statistics ===
==== Scoring leaders ====
The following players led the league in regular season points at the completion of all regular season games.

Player	Team	GP	G	A	Pts	PIM
Tyler Arnason	Fargo-Moorhead Ice Sharks	52	37	45	82	16
Nate DiCasmirro	North Iowa Huskies	52	29	45	74	118
Chad Theuer	Omaha Lancers	56	26	44	70	30
Gregg Zaporzan	Thunder Bay Flyers	56	32	35	67	53
Neil Breen	Omaha Lancers	56	27	38	65	48
Trent Clark	Lincoln/Dubuque	54	22	43	65	24
Josh Kern	Dubuque Fighting Saints	54	29	35	64	174
Bryan Lundbohm	Lincoln Stars	55	26	38	64	10
Peter Fregoe	Des Moines Buccaneers	54	31	32	63	51
Jesse Heerema	Thunder Bay Flyers	45	28	32	60	95

==== Leading goaltenders ====
Minimum 1000 minutes played.
Note: GP = Games played; Mins = Minutes played; W = Wins; L = Losses; OTL = Overtime losses; SO = Shutouts; GAA = Goals against average; SV% = Save percentage

Player	Team	GP	Mins	W	L	OTL	SO	GA	SV	SV%	GAA
Bob Revermann	Des Moines Buccaneers	20	1186	15	5	1	3	32	480	.938	1.62
Gregg Naumenko	North Iowa Huskies	38	2172	23	14	3	3	80	823	.911	2.21
Tony Zasowski	Omaha Lancers	26	1352	15	6	1	1	56	590	.913	2.49
Jeff Sanger	Sioux City Musketeers	44	2556	25	16	1	4	108	1,224	.919	2.54
Dennis Bassett	Omaha Lancers	30	1784	20	9	1	0	76	670	.898	2.56

== Clark Cup playoffs ==
The regular season division champions received the top two seeds.
Teams were reseeded after the quarterfinal round.

Quarterfinal (Best-of-7)
S1	Des Moines Buccaneers	5	3	7	8	-	-	-
8	Green Bay Gamblers	0	0	3	4	-	-	-
N1	North Iowa Huskies	6	1	4	4	4	-	-
7	Waterloo Black Hawks	4	3	1	1	2	-	-
3	Omaha Lancers	3	5	9	4	-	-	-
6	Fargo-Moorhead Ice Sharks	2	1	4	3	-	-	-
4	Lincoln Stars	2	4	2	5	5	-	-
5	Sioux City Musketeers	1	2	3	1	3	-	-

Semifinal (Best-of-7)
S1	Des Moines Buccaneers	5*	2	5	9	-	-	-
4	Lincoln Stars	4	0	1	3	-	-	-
N1	North Iowa Huskies	2	4	1	1	4	1	-
3	Omaha Lancers	3	0	3*	8	1	4	-

Championship (Best-of-7)
S1	Des Moines Buccaneers	3	2	2	2	-	-	-
3	Omaha Lancers	4	5	4	5	-	-	-

Note: * denotes overtime period(s)

== Awards ==
Award	Recipient	Team
Player of the Year	Nate DiCasmirro	North Iowa Huskies
Forward of the Year	Nate DiCasmirro	North Iowa Huskies
Defenseman of the Year	Jason Basile	Des Moines Buccaneers
Goaltender of the Year	Josh Blackburn	Lincoln Stars
Rookie of the Year	Mark Cullen	Fargo-Moorhead Ice Sharks
Coach of the Year	Dave Hakstol	Sioux City Musketeers
General Manager of the Year	Scott Owens	Des Moines Buccaneers
