= List of NHL overtime game sevens =

In the National Hockey League (NHL), a game seven is the final game in a best-of-seven series in the Stanley Cup playoffs. Based on the playoffs format arrangement, it is played in the venue of the team holding home-ice advantage for the series.

Games that are tied at the end of regulation time go to sudden-death overtime. This means that the team who scores next goal wins the series. There have been 51 overtime game sevens in NHL history. Home teams are 27–23 in overtime game sevens.

Each sudden-death overtime period is 20 minutes. If no goal is scored, another period is added, with full intermissions between overtime periods. The longest game seven overtime took place in 1987, which required four overtime periods, when the New York Islanders defeated the Washington Capitals in the Easter Epic. Of the 51 overtime game sevens, 36 finished in the first overtime, 13 finished in double overtime, 1 finished in triple overtime, and 1 finished in quadruple overtime.

== Key ==
OT	Overtime (the number in front indicates the number of overtime periods played, if there were more than one)
†	Indicates the team that scored a game seven overtime after coming back from a 0–3 series deficit
§	Indicates the team that was scored on in a game seven overtime after coming back from a 0–3 series deficit
Road*	Indicates a game seven overtime that was scored by the road team
Year (X)	Indicates the number of game seven overtimes played in that year's postseason Each year is linked to an article about that particular NHL season
^	Indicates game seven overtime in the Stanley Cup Finals
~	Indicates the winner became the Stanley Cup champions

== All-time game seven overtimes ==
See Also: List of NHL game sevens

Year	Playoff round	Date	Venue	OT Goal	Winner	Result	Loser	Ref.
1939 (1)	Semifinals	April 2, 1939	Boston Garden	Mel Hill	Boston Bruins~	2–1 (3OT)	New York Rangers §	
1950 (1)	Semifinals	April 9, 1950	Detroit Olympia	Leo Reise Jr.	Detroit Red Wings ~	1–0 (OT)	Toronto Maple Leafs	
1950 (2)	Finals	April 23, 1950	Detroit Olympia	Pete Babando	Detroit Red Wings ~	4–3 (2OT)^	New York Rangers	
1954 (1)	Finals	April 16, 1954	Detroit Olympia	Tony Leswick	Detroit Red Wings ~	2–1 (OT)^	Montreal Canadiens	
1968 (1)	Semifinals	May 3, 1968	St. Louis Arena	Ron Schock	St. Louis Blues	2–1 (2OT)	Minnesota North Stars	
1972 (1)	Quarterfinals	April 16, 1972	Metropolitan Sports Center	Kevin O'Shea	St. Louis Blues	2–1 (OT)*	Minnesota North Stars	
1978 (1)	Quarterfinals	April 29, 1978	Nassau Coliseum	Lanny McDonald	Toronto Maple Leafs	2–1 (OT)*	New York Islanders	
1979 (1)	Semifinals	May 10, 1979	Montreal Forum	Yvon Lambert	Montreal Canadiens~	5–4 (OT)	Boston Bruins	
1983 (1)	Division Finals	April 24, 1983	Boston Garden	Brad Park	Boston Bruins	3–2 (OT)	Buffalo Sabres	
1984 (1)	Division Finals	April 22, 1984	Met Center	Steve Payne	Minnesota North Stars	4–3 (OT)	St. Louis Blues	
1985 (1)	Division Finals	May 2, 1985	Montreal Forum	Peter Stastny	Quebec Nordiques	3–2 (OT)*	Montreal Canadiens	
1986 (1)	Division Finals	April 29, 1986	Montreal Forum	Claude Lemieux	Montreal Canadiens~	2–1 (OT)	Hartford Whalers	
1987 (1)	Division Semifinals	April 18, 1987	Capital Centre	Pat LaFontaine	New York Islanders	3–2 (4OT)*	Washington Capitals	
1988 (1)	Division Semifinals	April 16, 1988	Capital Centre	Dale Hunter	Washington Capitals	5–4 (OT)	Philadelphia Flyers	
1989 (1)	Division Semifinals	April 15, 1989	Olympic Saddledome	Joel Otto	Calgary Flames~	4–3 (OT)	Vancouver Canucks	
1991 (1)	Division Semifinals	April 16, 1991	Olympic Saddledome	Esa Tikkanen	Edmonton Oilers	5–4 (OT)*	Calgary Flames	
1992 (1)	Division Semifinals	May 1, 1992	Montreal Forum	Russ Courtnall	Montreal Canadiens	3–2 (2OT)	Hartford Whalers	
1993 (1)	Division Semifinals	May 1, 1993	Joe Louis Arena	Nikolai Borschevsky	Toronto Maple Leafs	4–3 (OT)*	Detroit Red Wings	
1993 (2)	Division Finals	May 14, 1993	Civic Arena	David Volek	New York Islanders	4–3 (OT)*	Pittsburgh Penguins	
1994 (1)	First Round	April 30, 1994	Olympic Saddledome	Pavel Bure	Vancouver Canucks	4–3 (2OT)*	Calgary Flames	
1994 (2)	Conference Finals	May 27, 1994	Madison Square Garden	Stéphane Matteau	New York Rangers~	2–1 (2OT)	New Jersey Devils	
1995 (1)	First Round	May 19, 1995	Olympic Saddledome	Ray Whitney	San Jose Sharks	5–4 (2OT)*	Calgary Flames	
1996 (1)	Conference Semifinals	May 16, 1996	Joe Louis Arena	Steve Yzerman	Detroit Red Wings	1–0 (2OT)	St. Louis Blues	
1997 (1)	First Round	April 29, 1997	Marine Midland Arena	Derek Plante	Buffalo Sabres	3–2 (OT)	Ottawa Senators	
1997 (2)	First Round	April 29, 1997	Reunion Arena	Todd Marchant	Edmonton Oilers	4–3 (OT)*	Dallas Stars	
1999 (1)	First Round	May 4, 1999	America West Arena	Pierre Turgeon	St. Louis Blues	1–0 (OT)*	Phoenix Coyotes	
2001 (1)	Conference Semifinals	May 10, 2001	HSBC Arena	Darius Kasparaitis	Pittsburgh Penguins	3–2 (OT)*	Buffalo Sabres	
2003 (1)	First Round	April 22, 2003	Pepsi Center	Andrew Brunette	Minnesota Wild	3–2 (OT)*	Colorado Avalanche	
2004 (1)	First Round	April 19, 2004	GM Place	Martin Gélinas	Calgary Flames	3–2 (OT)*	Vancouver Canucks	
2008 (1)	First Round	April 22, 2008	Verizon Center	Joffery Lupul	Philadelphia Flyers	3–2 (OT)*	Washington Capitals	
2009 (1)	Conference Semifinals	May 14, 2009	TD Banknorth Garden	Scott Walker	Carolina Hurricanes	3–2 (OT)*	Boston Bruins	
2011 (1)	First Round	April 26, 2011	Rogers Arena	Alex Burrows	Vancouver Canucks	2–1 (OT)	Chicago Blackhawks §	
2011 (2)	First Round	April 27, 2011	TD Garden	Nathan Horton	Boston Bruins~	4–3 (OT)	Montreal Canadiens	
2012 (1)	First Round	April 25, 2012	TD Garden	Joel Ward	Washington Capitals	2–1 (OT)*	Boston Bruins	
2012 (2)	First Round	April 26, 2012	BankAtlantic Center	Adam Henrique	New Jersey Devils	3–2 (2OT)*	Florida Panthers	
2013 (1)	First Round	May 13, 2013	TD Garden	Patrice Bergeron	Boston Bruins	5–4 (OT)	Toronto Maple Leafs	
2013 (2)	Conference Semifinals	May 29, 2013	United Center	Brent Seabrook	Chicago Blackhawks~	2–1 (OT)	Detroit Red Wings	
2014 (1)	First Round	April 30, 2014	Pepsi Center	Nino Niederreiter	Minnesota Wild	5–4 (OT)*	Colorado Avalanche	
2014 (2)	Conference Finals	June 1, 2014	United Center	Alec Martinez	Los Angeles Kings~	5–4 (OT)*	Chicago Blackhawks	
2015 (1)	Second Round	May 13, 2015	Madison Square Garden	Derek Stepan	New York Rangers	2–1 (OT)	Washington Capitals	
2017 (1)	Conference Finals	May 25, 2017	PPG Paints Arena	Chris Kunitz	Pittsburgh Penguins~	3–2 (2OT)	Ottawa Senators	
2019 (1)	First Round	April 23, 2019	SAP Center at San Jose	Barclay Goodrow	San Jose Sharks	5–4 (OT)	Vegas Golden Knights	
2019 (2)	First Round	April 24, 2019	Capital One Arena	Brock McGinn	Carolina Hurricanes	4–3 (2OT)*	Washington Capitals	
2019 (3)	Second Round	May 7, 2019	Enterprise Center	Pat Maroon	St. Louis Blues~	2–1 (2OT)	Dallas Stars	
2020 (1)	Second Round	September 4, 2020	Rogers Place	Joel Kiviranta	Dallas Stars	5–4 (OT)	Colorado Avalanche	
2022 (1)	First Round	May 15, 2022	Madison Square Garden	Artemi Panarin	New York Rangers	4–3 (OT)	Pittsburgh Penguins	
2022 (2)	First Round	May 15, 2022	Scotiabank Saddledome	Johnny Gaudreau	Calgary Flames	3–2 (OT)	Dallas Stars	
2023 (1)	First Round	April 30, 2023	TD Garden	Carter Verhaeghe	Florida Panthers	4–3 (OT)*	Boston Bruins	
2024 (1)	First Round	May 4, 2024	TD Garden	David Pastrnak	Boston Bruins	2–1 (OT)	Toronto Maple Leafs	
2025 (1)	First Round	May 4, 2025	Canada Life Centre	Adam Lowry	Winnipeg Jets	4–3 (2OT)*	St. Louis Blues	
2026 (1)	Second Round	May 18, 2026	KeyBank Center	Alex Newhook	Montreal Canadiens	3–2 (OT)*	Buffalo Sabres	

== Notes ==
- ^{a} The home-and-away format in every round of the playoffs, is the 2–2–1–1–1 format (the team with the better regular season record plays on their home ice in games one, two, five and seven. In the finals, the team with the better regular season plays on their home ice in those games).
