= Capitals–Islanders rivalry =

National Hockey League rivalry

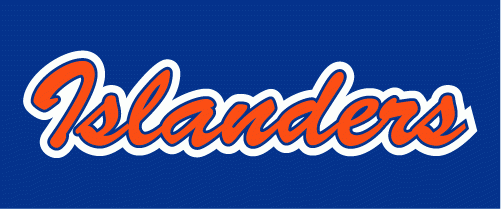
- Washington Capitals New York Islanders
- First meeting: October 20, 1974
- Latest meeting: February 2, 2026
- Next meeting: December 30, 2026

Statistics
- Total meetings: 291
- All-time series: 146–125–13–7 (WSH)
- Regular season series: 129–100–13–7 (WSH)
- Postseason results: 25–17 (NYI)
- Largest victory: NYI 8–1 WSH; March 23, 1982; November 30, 1991 NYI 7–0 WSH; December 29, 1974
- Longest win streak: WSH W11
- Current win streak: WSH W2

Postseason history
- 1983 division semifinals: Islanders won, 3–1; 1984 division finals: Islanders won, 4–1; 1985 division semifinals: Islanders won, 3–2; 1986 division semifinals: Capitals won, 3–0; 1987 division semifinals: Islanders won, 4–3; 1993 division semifinals: Islanders won, 4–2; 2015 first round: Capitals won, 4–3; 2020 first round: Islanders won, 4–1

The Capitals–Islanders rivalry is a National Hockey League (NHL) rivalry between the Washington Capitals and the New York Islanders. Both teams compete in the Eastern Conference's Metropolitan Division. The two teams were heated rivals mainly during the 1980s and early 1990s, although tensions have flared once more in the late 2010s and early 2020s.

== History ==
=== 1980s ===
In 1983, the two teams met in the playoffs for the first time ever. The Islanders were the three-time defending Stanley Cup champions while the Capitals were in the playoffs for the first time in franchise history. The Islanders won the series three games to one on their way to their fourth straight Stanley Cup.

The next year, the two teams met again, this time they were evenly matched as the Capitals finished second in the division with 101 points, three points back of the first place Islanders. The Islanders were nearly eliminated in the opening round by their crosstown rivals, the New York Rangers, before Ken Morrow scored the overtime winner in the fifth and deciding game. Meanwhile, the Capitals had a much easier first round as they swept the Philadelphia Flyers in three straight games. Washington won the opener by a score of 3–2, but the Islanders won the next four games to take the series in five on their way to the Stanley Cup Final, where they lost to the Edmonton Oilers in five games.

In 1985, the Islanders became the first NHL team to comeback from a 2–0 deficit in a best-of-five series against the Capitals.

In 1986, the Capitals were finally victorious over the Islanders in the playoffs, having their best regular season in franchise history (until 2009), winning 50 games and recorded 107 points, swept the Islanders in three straight games for their first ever playoff series win over the Islanders.

In 1987, the teams had one of the most memorable playoff series in NHL history. The Capitals won game one by a score of 4–3, before the Islanders won the next game 3–1 to tie the series at one win each. When the series shifted to New York, the Capitals took control winning the next two games by scores of 2–0 and 4–1 to take a 3–1 series lead. The opening round of the playoffs was expanded to a best-of-seven. The Islanders won game five in Washington by a score of 4–2 and game six at home 5–4, sending the series back to the Capital Centre for the seventh and deciding game. In game seven, the Capitals had a 1–0 lead near the end of the first period on a goal by Mike Gartner. In the second, New York got on the board when Patrick Flatley scored at 11:39 to tie the game at one. Late in the period, Grant Martin scored to give the Capitals a 2–1 lead after two periods of play. Then, at 14:37 of the third period, Bryan Trottier scored to tie the game at two. No one in attendance at the Capital Centre or watching at home on TV knew it yet, but the game had not yet reached its halfway point. In overtime, the two goaltenders, Kelly Hrudey for the Islanders and Bob Mason for Washington went at it save for save, stopping every scoring chance the other team had. Finally, after three scoreless overtimes, Pat LaFontaine scored the winner at 8:47 of the fourth overtime period, giving the Islanders a 3–2 victory and a 4–3 series win in a game known as the Easter Epic.

=== 1990s ===
Six years later in 1993, the teams met once again, the Capitals finished second in the division with 93 points, six points ahead of the Islanders. Washington won the opener by a score of 3–1, before the Islanders won the next three games, all in overtime, including two in double OT to take a 3–1 series lead. Washington won game five to stave off elimination, but the Islanders won game six 5–3 to take the series in six. However, the win was marred as Pierre Turgeon suffered a shoulder injury of a vicious check by Washington's Dale Hunter after scoring a goal to clinch the game and series for Islanders. Consequently, Hunter was suspended for the first 21 games of the 1993–94 season.

=== 2010s ===
Both teams met in the 2015 Eastern Conference first round, with Washington winning the series 4–3. Since this series, the rivalry has been fiercely reignited, showing through the remainder of the 2010s into the 2020s.

=== 2020s ===
The two teams met again in the playoffs in the 2020 Eastern Conference first round, where the Islanders won the series 4–1. Following the series, Capitals head coach Todd Reirden was fired.

== See also ==
- List of NHL rivalries
- Commanders–Giants rivalry
- Capitals–Rangers rivalry
- Atlantic Cup
- Easter Epic
