= Oskar Sundqvist =

Swedish ice hockey player (born 1994)

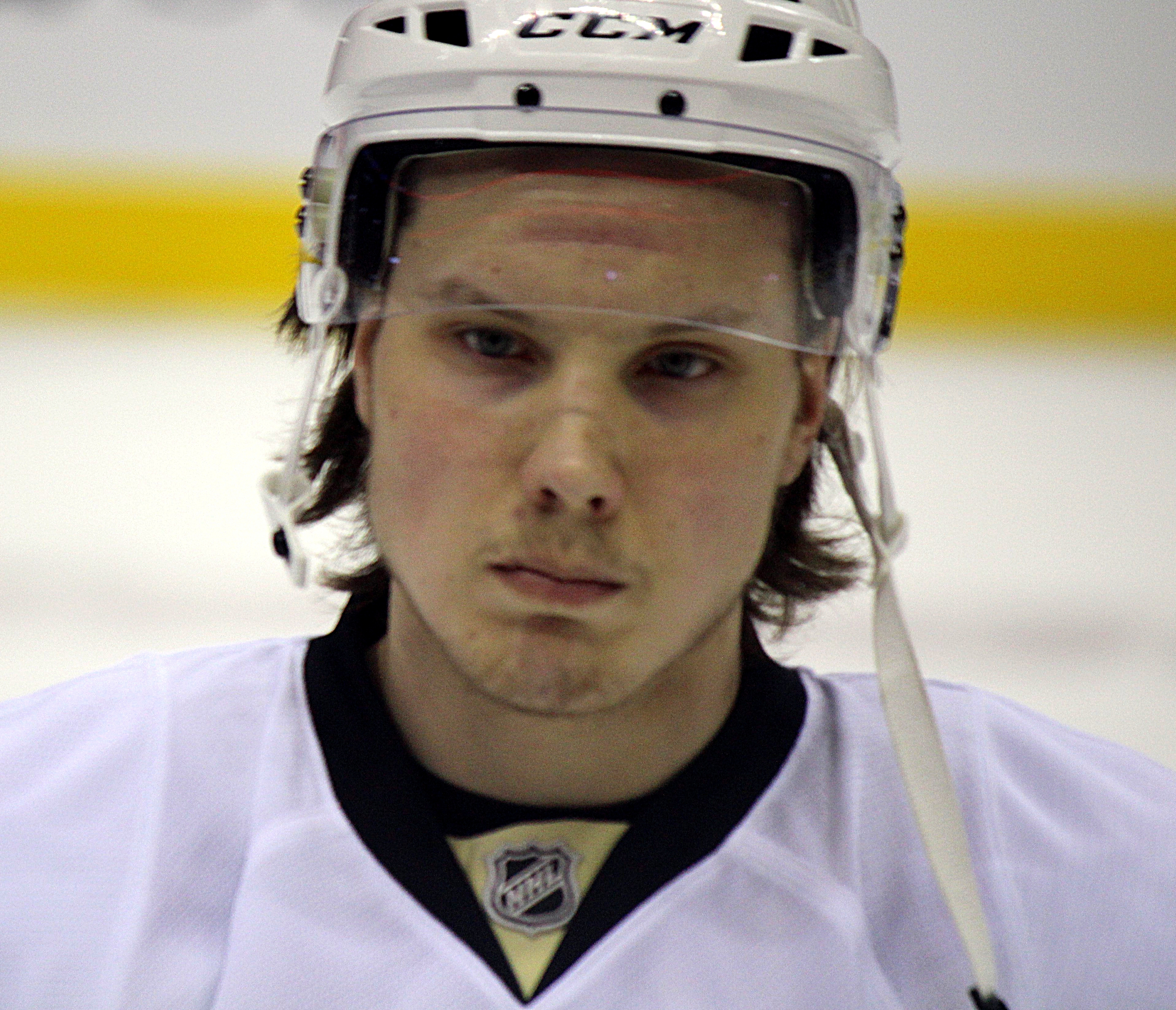
- Sundqvist with the Pittsburgh Penguins during the 2016 Stanley Cup playoffs
- Born: 23 March 1994 (age 32) Boden, Sweden
- Height: 6 ft 3 in (191 cm)
- Weight: 209 lb (95 kg; 14 st 13 lb)
- Position: Centre
- Shoots: Right
- NHL team (P) Cur. team Former teams: St. Louis Blues; Springfield Thunderbirds (AHL); Skellefteå AIK; Pittsburgh Penguins; Detroit Red Wings; Minnesota Wild
- National team: Sweden
- NHL draft: 81st overall, 2012; Pittsburgh Penguins
- Playing career: 2012–present

Oskar Sundqvist (born 23 March 1994) is a Swedish professional ice hockey player who is a centre for the Springfield Thunderbirds in the American Hockey League (AHL) while under contract to the St. Louis Blues of the National Hockey League (NHL).

Born in Boden, Sweden, Sundqvist played within the Skellefteå organization at both their club youth and professional levels. After being drafted in the third round, 81st overall, of the 2012 NHL entry draft by the Pittsburgh Penguins, Sundqvist won a silver medal with Sweden junior team at the 2014 World Junior Championships.

Upon moving to North America, Sundqvist spent three seasons within the Penguins organization, with whom he won the 2016 Stanley Cup. In 2017, he was traded to the Blues and helped them win their first Stanley Cup in franchise history.

== Playing career ==
=== Sweden ===
Sundqvist was born on 23 March 1994 in Boden, Sweden. Growing up in Sweden, Sundqvist played within the Skellefteå organization in their club youth levels. He chose to play for Skellefteå after the hockey gymnasium school in Luleå showed little interest. Sundqvist recorded 22 goals and 54 points in 41 games with the Skellefteå's Junior team before being drafted in the third round, 81st overall, by the Pittsburgh Penguins in the 2012 NHL entry draft. The Penguins were originally skeptical of Sundqvist due to his size and lack of visibility due to his location, but conceded after encouragement from European scout Tommy Westlund. Penguins assistant director of amateur scouting Randy Sexton praised Sundqvist following the draft by saying "He's big, he's rangy, he skates and plays very hard. He's got good hands close to the net and he can finish. He's a Penguin." After his selection, Sundqvist was invited to the Penguins' Prospect Development Camp before returning to his home country where he made his Swedish Elite League (SEL) debut with Skellefteå on 24 October 2012 against Frölunda HC. He scored his first career SHL goal in a game against Frölunda HC on 5 January 2013. He completed his rookie campaign with the team recording one point in 14 games.

During the summer prior to the 2013–14 season, Sundqvist was invited to participate in the Penguins' Prospect Development Camp at the Consol Energy Center. He also joined the team for their preseason games, during which head coach Mike Johnston said "He's a very good prospect... He's got size, he's good both ways, he's responsible, so he's going to be a very good player for this organization." Upon returning to his home country for the season, Sundqvist was selected to compete with Sweden men's national junior ice hockey team at the 2014 World Junior Ice Hockey Championships. He scored the game-winning goal in the third period against Russia to help send Sweden to the gold medal round against Finland, although they ended the tournament with a silver medal. He returned to Skellefteå where he helped them win the 2014 Swedish Championship by recording six points in 13 playoff games.

Following the conclusion of the SHL season, the Penguins signed Sundqvist to a three-year, entry-level contract. After attending the Penguins training camp, he was returned to Skellefteå AIK on 7 October 2014 for the 2014–15 season. In his last season in the Swedish league, Sundqvist recorded a career high nine goals and 19 points, but was often recovering from injuries. During a game in December, Sundqvist took a puck to the wrist and was forced to leave a game early. A few months later, Sundqvist took a hit to the face by Janne Jalasvaara during a game and was forced to miss time to recover. Sundqvist said that he had "lost the feeling all over my face, still have no feeling on my nose and under my eye."

=== Pittsburgh Penguins ===
On 27 April 2015, following the completion of the 2014–15 SHL season, Sundqvist began his North American professional career after being reassigned to the Penguins' American Hockey League (AHL) affiliate, the Wilkes-Barre/Scranton Penguins. He played one game with the Penguins during their Calder Cup playoff run.

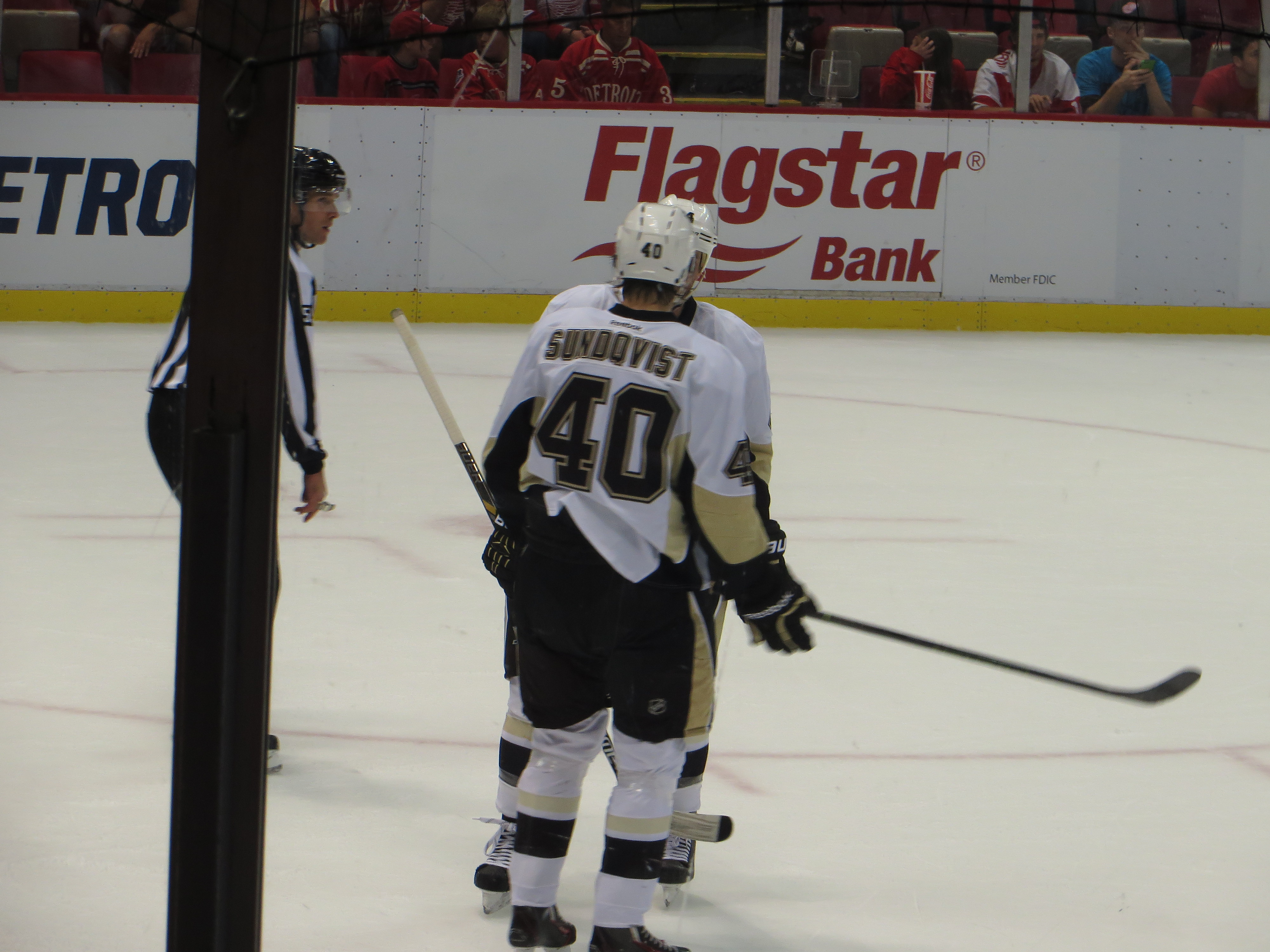
Sundqvist with the Pittsburgh Penguins at Joe Louis Arena in 2015

During the off-season, Sundqvist chose to remain in North America rather than return home to train. When reflecting on his decision, Sundqvist said "It's a big difference....I mean, last year I came here and I played between 6-10 games. Now I came here and haven't played any games, so I feel a big difference." Leading up to the 2015–16 season, Sundqvist was vying for the Penguins' fourth line centre position. Due to a hamstring injury, Sundqvist was unable to participate at the Penguins summer development camp but was healthy enough for their training camp. After attending the Penguins training camp, Sundqvist was shortly assigned to the Wilkes-Barre/Scranton Penguins before being recalled to the NHL prior to the 2015–16 opening night. The reason for the short-lived promotion was for salary relief for players on their injured reserve list. Upon returning to the Wilkes-Barre/Scranton Penguins in the AHL, Sundqvist played on the team's third line alongside Dominik Uher and Tom Kostopoulos. He was recalled to the NHL on 4 February 2016 and made his NHL debut the next day in a loss to the Tampa Bay Lightning. He scored his first career NHL goal in a 5–0 win over the New York Islanders on 2 April, scoring the first goal of the first period within the periods first 13 minutes. Sundqvist appeared in 18 games for the team during the regular season, as well as two postseason games, as the Penguins went on to win the Stanley Cup, defeating the San Jose Sharks in six games. Sundqvist did not play in the finals or in enough regular season games to get his name on the Stanley Cup; however, Pittsburgh honored him with a Stanley Cup ring and a day with the Cup.

After attending the Penguins training camp prior to the 2016–17 season, Sundqvist was again reassigned to the AHL. This season proved to be his strongest in the AHL, setting new career highs in both goals and points. Early on in the season, he surpassed his previous career high in goals by his 16th game. While playing in a game against the Hershey Bears on 10 December 2016, Sundqvist became the third Penguin in franchise history to record four goals in a game. He spent the majority of the season in the AHL, earning his first recall on March 10 after 53 games. In order to join the Penguins in Edmonton for their game against the Oilers, he traveled from Wilkes-Barre to New York, to Toronto, to Edmonton, arriving in the city late Thursday. He went pointless during the game but provided a screen for Ian Cole's game-winning goal the following night against the Vancouver Canucks. Upon returning to the AHL, his offensive output helped lift the Wilkes-Barre/Scranton and they became the first team in the league to reach 100 points, with Sundqvist recording three points during the game for a total of 103 in his career. Following this game, Sundqvist was recalled to the NHL with teammates Jean-Sébastien Dea and Derrick Pouliot to play in the Penguins final game of the season. As a result of his offensive outburst, Sundqvist was one of three Penguins players to surpass 20 goals during the season. He concluded his AHL season with a career-high 20 goals and 46 points despite spending parts of the season in the NHL.

=== St. Louis Blues ===
During the 2017 NHL entry draft, Sundqvist and the Penguins' first-round pick were traded to the St. Louis Blues in exchange for Ryan Reaves and their second-round pick. He signed a one-year, $675,000 contract with the Blues before making their opening night roster for the 2017–18 season. He appeared in 30 games for the team until he was reassigned to their AHL affiliate, the San Antonio Rampage, on 31 January. His stint in the AHL was short-lived and he spent the majority of the 2017–18 season with the Blues, appearing in 42 games altogether. In those 42 games, Sundqvist recorded a career high five points while playing on the fourth line and averaged nearly a minute on the penalty kill.

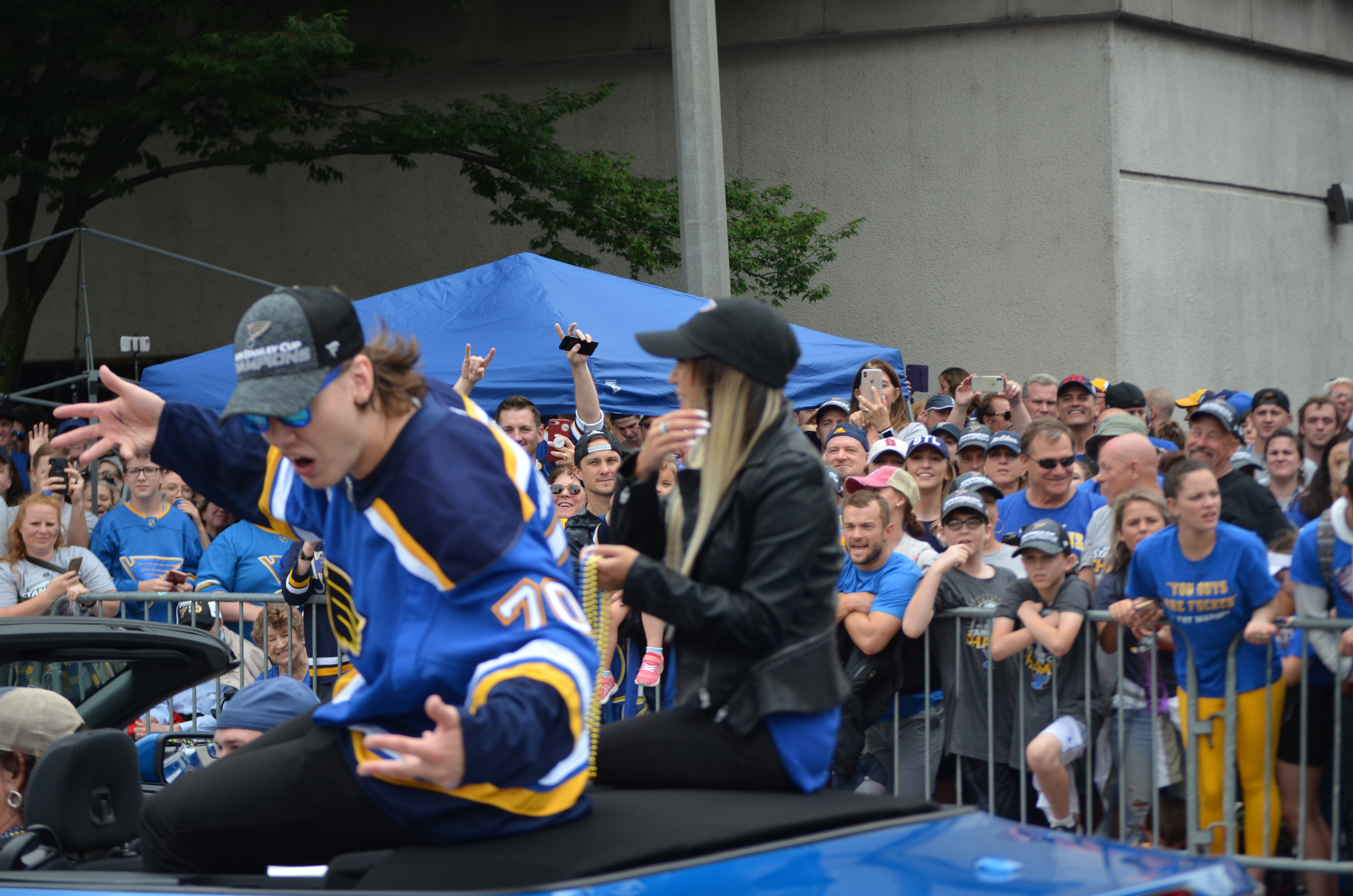
Sundqvist during the 2019 Stanley Cup parade

Following his career-best season, Sundqvist and the Blues agreed to another one-year contract worth $700,000, instead of opting for free agency. While playing with the St. Louis Blues during the 2018 pre-season, Sundqvist suffered a head injury as a result of a hit from Washington Capitals player Tom Wilson, who was subsequently suspended. Sundqvist was immediately placed on the team's injured reserve to recover but returned to the lineup on 25 October after missing eight games. Upon his return, he made an immediate impact on the Blues lineup, matching his career goal total of two during a game against the Vegas Golden Knights and surpassing it a game later. In spite of his hot start, by 2 January 2019, the Blues were in last place around the entire league, which resulted in a coaching and goaltender change. Along with the changes, Sundqvist recorded a career-high 31 points in 71 games to help the Blues qualify for the 2019 Stanley Cup playoffs. During their playoff run, coach Craig Berube praised Sundqvist by calling him a "good player and penalty killer" and saying he "does a lot of good things for us on both sides of the puck." Prior to the 2019 Stanley Cup Final against the Boston Bruins, Sundqvist averaged 15:55 minutes of ice time and recorded nine points in 21 post season games.

Throughout the Finals, Sundqvist played with Ivan Barbashev and Alexander Steen on the Blues' fourth line against Patrice Bergeron's line. Following a game one loss, Sundqvist delivered an elbow to the head of Bruins defenceman Matt Grzelcyk, causing him to leave the game. At the time, Sundqvist received a two-minute minor penalty but was later suspended one game by the NHL's department of player safety. Upon returning from his suspension, Sundqvist helped the Blues win their first Stanley Cup in franchise history.

On 21 July 2019, Sundqvist signed a four-year, $11 million contract extension with the Blues instead of opting for free agency. During the shortened 2019–20 season, Sundqvist saw limited playing time due to various injuries. On 17 November, Sundqvist was fined $7,392.47 for charging Anaheim Ducks player John Gibson during a 4–1 loss. A few days later, after appearing in a total of 26 games and recording eight goals, Sundqvist was placed on the team's injured reserve to recover from a lower body injury. He was activated off injured reserve on 13 December, where he recorded a goal and an assist during the Blues' 4–2 win over the Golden Knights. In late January, Sundqvist was again placed on the team's injured reserve to recover from a lower body injury suffered during a game against the Vancouver Canucks. He was activated off injured reserve on 16 February 2020, after missing eight games. Prior to the cancellation of the regular season due to the COVID-19 pandemic, Sundqvist was fined $5,000 for roughing Chicago Blackhawks defenceman Adam Boqvist during a game on 8 March. He also suffered a shoulder/AC joint injury during the Blues' final regular season game against the Anaheim Ducks, but used the NHL's pause in play as a time to recover. When asked about his injury in June, Sundqvist said "I feel great. I'm all ready to go and feeling 100 percent. It's been a while since I felt 100 percent during the season, so I would be excited to be back."

On 19 March 2021, Sundqvist left a game against the San Jose Sharks with a lower-body injury. The following day, it was announced that Sundqvist had torn his ACL in his left knee, and would miss the remainder of the 2020–21 season. During the 2021–22 season, he recorded four goals and 11 assists in 41 games with the Blues.

=== Detroit Red Wings ===
On 21 March 2022, Sundqvist was traded to the Detroit Red Wings, along with Jake Walman, and a second-round pick in 2023 NHL entry draft, in exchange for Nick Leddy and Luke Witkowski

=== Minnesota Wild ===
On 3 March 2023, the Red Wings traded Sundqvist to the Minnesota Wild in exchange for a fourth-round pick in the 2023 NHL entry draft.

=== Return to St. Louis ===
As a free agent from the Wild, Sundqvist was signed to a one-year, $775,000 contract to return to the St. Louis Blues for the 2023–24 season on 12 July 2023. On 7 March 2024, he signed a two-year contract extension with the Blues. During the season Sundqvist recorded six goals and 15 assists in 71 games before suffering a season-ending anterior cruciate ligament (ACL) injury on 25 March.

After testing free agency, Sundqvist was re-signed by the Blues to a one-year, two-way contract extension on July 10, 2026.

== Personal life ==
Sundqvist is cousin with television presenter and reporter Jessica Almenäs who represented Sweden in Miss World 1998.

== Career statistics ==
=== Regular season and playoffs ===
			Regular season					Playoffs
Season	Team	League	GP	G	A	Pts	PIM	GP	G	A	Pts	PIM
2010–11	Skellefteå AIK	J18	21	13	12	25	54	—	—	—	—	—
2010–11	Skellefteå AIK	J18 Allsv	17	6	4	10	46	8	1	0	1	29
2010–11	Skellefteå AIK	J20	1	0	0	0	0	—	—	—	—	—
2011–12	Skellefteå AIK	J18	22	13	23	36	78	—	—	—	—	—
2011–12	Skellefteå AIK	J18 Allsv	17	8	9	17	51	7	5	5	10	14
2011–12	Skellefteå AIK	J20	2	1	0	1	0	—	—	—	—	—
2012–13	Skellefteå AIK	J20	38	17	16	33	48	5	3	2	5	4
2012–13	Skellefteå AIK	SEL	14	1	0	1	8	—	—	—	—	—
2013–14	Skellefteå AIK	SHL	51	6	10	16	16	13	4	2	6	16
2014–15	Skellefteå AIK	SHL	41	9	10	19	34	15	1	4	5	18
2014–15	Wilkes–Barre/Scranton Penguins	AHL	—	—	—	—	—	1	0	0	0	0
2015–16	Wilkes–Barre/Scranton Penguins	AHL	45	5	12	17	30	—	—	—	—	—
2015–16	Pittsburgh Penguins	NHL	18	1	3	4	4	2	0	0	0	0
2016–17	Wilkes–Barre/Scranton Penguins	AHL	63	20	26	46	52	5	0	1	1	19
2016–17	Pittsburgh Penguins	NHL	10	0	0	0	2	—	—	—	—	—
2017–18	St. Louis Blues	NHL	42	1	4	5	14	—	—	—	—	—
2017–18	San Antonio Rampage	AHL	6	2	4	6	6	—	—	—	—	—
2018–19	St. Louis Blues	NHL	74	14	17	31	22	25	4	5	9	8
2019–20	St. Louis Blues	NHL	57	12	11	23	28	9	0	1	1	2
2020–21	St. Louis Blues	NHL	28	4	5	9	14	—	—	—	—	—
2021–22	St. Louis Blues	NHL	41	4	11	15	12	—	—	—	—	—
2021–22	Detroit Red Wings	NHL	18	4	4	8	17	—	—	—	—	—
2022–23	Detroit Red Wings	NHL	52	7	14	21	20	—	—	—	—	—
2022–23	Minnesota Wild	NHL	15	3	4	7	8	1	1	0	1	0
2023–24	St. Louis Blues	NHL	71	6	15	21	32	—	—	—	—	—
2024–25	St. Louis Blues	NHL	67	6	14	20	32	7	1	1	2	6
2025–26	St. Louis Blues	NHL	52	5	12	17	26	—	—	—	—	—
SHL totals			106	16	20	37	58	28	5	6	11	34
NHL totals			545	67	114	181	231	44	6	7	13	16

=== International ===
Year	Team	Event	Result	GP	G	A	Pts	PIM
2014	Sweden	WJC	2nd place, silver medalist(s)	7	2	0	2	4
2026	Sweden	WC	7th	8	0	0	0	6
Junior totals				7	2	0	2	4
Junior totals				8	0	0	0	6

== Awards and honours ==
Award	Year	Ref
NHL
Stanley Cup champion	2016, 2019	
