= Easter Epic =

1987 NHL playoff game between the New York Islanders and the Washington Capitals

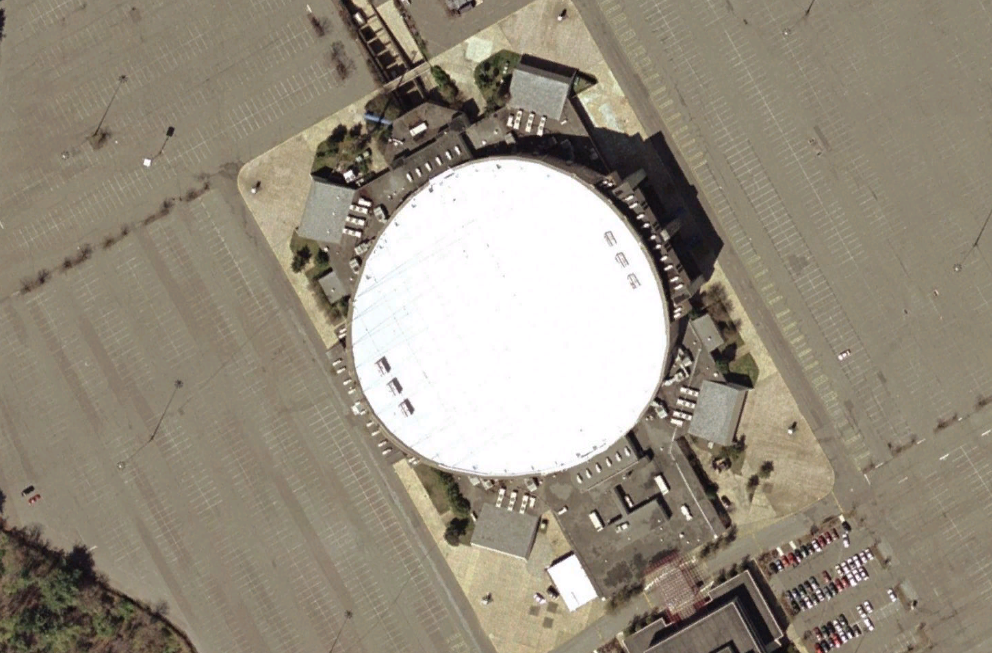
- The Capital Centre, where the game took place.
	1	2	3	OT	2OT	3OT	4OT	Total
New York Islanders	0	1	1	0	0	0	1	3
Washington Capitals	1	1	0	0	0	0	0	2
- Date: April 18, 1987
- Arena: Capital Centre
- City: Landover, Maryland
- Attendance: 18,130

The Easter Epic is the nickname given to a National Hockey League (NHL) ice hockey game during the 1987 Stanley Cup playoffs between the New York Islanders and Washington Capitals. The seventh and deciding game of the Patrick Division semifinals, it was played April 18–19, 1987, at the Capital Centre in Landover, Maryland, and is so named because the game started on Saturday evening but did not finish until the early hours of Easter Sunday.

As of 2026, the game is notable for the following:

- It is the longest Game 7 in Stanley Cup playoff history and one of two Game 7's (the other being in 1939) to need three or more overtimes
- It was the first Game 7 since 1968 to need more than one overtime period
- It was the first game since 1971 to go into a third overtime and the first since 1951 to go into a fourth
- It was the first time in Stanley Cup playoff history that the road team won Game 7 beyond the first overtime period
- It was the only playoff game that season to go beyond one overtime period

The game finally ended at the 8:47 mark of the fourth overtime when Pat LaFontaine was able to keep the puck in Washington's zone, firing a slapshot over the glove side of Washington goaltender Bob Mason.

The game was included in its entirety on the New York Islanders 10 Greatest Games DVD box set released in 2009.

== The series ==
The 1987 Patrick Division semifinals pitted the third-place New York Islanders against the second-place Washington Capitals in a best-of-seven series. It was the fifth consecutive playoff meeting between the teams; the Islanders had won three of the previous four series, but looked to avenge their earliest exit ever from the playoffs at the hands of the Capitals the previous spring.

The first two games were played at the Capitals' home arena, Capital Centre. Washington won Game 1, 4–3, and the Isles were victorious in Game 2, 3–1, sending the series to Long Island tied at one game apiece.

At the Nassau Veterans Memorial Coliseum, the Islanders dropped Games 3 (2–0) and 4 (4–1) to fall behind in the series, 3–1. No NHL team had won a series coming back from such a deficit in 12 years; coincidentally, it was the Islanders who performed the feat, climbing out of a 3–0 hole to beat the Pittsburgh Penguins in 1975. In similar comeback fashion, just two years earlier, the Islanders became the first team to win a best-of-5 series after trailing 2–0; that series was also against the Caps.

Armed with that history, the Islanders staved off elimination, winning 4–2 in Game 5. Their momentum continued, and the Islanders won Game 6, 5–4, at home. This brought the Islanders and Capitals to a decisive Game 7, before a sold-out crowd on Washington's home ice.

== Game 7 ==
With national television audiences watching in both the United States (on ESPN, with Mike Emrick and Bill Clement on the call) and in Canada (on Hockey Night in Canada, with Bob Cole and Harry Neale on the call), Game 7 began at 7:30 p.m. Eastern Daylight Time. ESPN was blacked out in the New York City and Washington, D.C., markets, to protect the Islanders' and Capitals' local broadcast outlets. This was the lone game of the night, as the other seven first-round playoff series had already concluded.

=== Regulation ===
The Capitals dominated the first period. The game was scoreless through 19 minutes when Washington's Mike Gartner beat Islander goaltender Kelly Hrudey to give the Capitals the lead after one period, 1–0.

Patrick Flatley tied the score at 1 midway through the second period, but Grant Martin responded for the Capitals, and after two periods, they led 2–1. Washington had outshot New York to this point 25–10, and carried the play for most of the first forty minutes.

The game remained 2–1 through most of the third period, thanks to the strong netminding efforts of Hrudey and Mason.

Then, with just over five minutes remaining in regulation, Islander legend Bryan Trottier backhanded a shot between Mason's pads, thanks in part to a strap breaking on one of Mason's pads. A frantic final minutes produced no further scoring, and the game went into sudden death overtime tied at 2–2. Little did anyone know that this game had not even reached its halfway point yet.

=== Overtime ===
In the first overtime, Mason and Hrudey thwarted many scoring chances, and the game remained tied. Greg Smith of the Capitals had the best chance with seconds left, as his long-range slapshot beat Hrudey, but caught the right goal post and bounced away.

As the game moved on into the second overtime, the players began to show fatigue. Short bursts of action were replaced by longer periods of slow play. Hrudey continued to shine, stopping 17 shots in the second overtime session alone; Mason contributed nine more saves and was aided by a shot that hit the post by Randy Wood.

The scoreless second overtime set-up the first triple-overtime game since Pete Stemkowski had scored for the New York Rangers against the Chicago Blackhawks 16 years earlier.

Slowly, the Isles began to finally take the play from the Caps, outshooting Washington 11–10 in the third overtime. They had the better chances as well, but Mason continued his excellent play as the game remained tied. The scoreless third overtime set up the first quadruple-overtime game since Maurice Richard had scored for the Montreal Canadiens against the Detroit Red Wings 36 years earlier.

=== LaFontaine wins it ===
With both teams exhausted, play was choppy through the first eight minutes of the fourth overtime, the seventh period total. The Capitals had managed only one shot to the Islanders' five. Finally, with eight minutes elapsed in the fourth overtime period, New York's Ken Leiter carried the puck into the Capitals' zone and sent a pass through the slot.

Gord Dineen pinched in and carried the puck around the net for a shot which was blocked out to near the blue line. The deflection bounced to Islander star Pat LaFontaine, who had gone back to the blue line to cover for Leiter. He spun and launched a slapshot toward the net. Mason, screened on the play, never saw the puck as it clanged off the post to his left and into the net for the game-winner. The then-fifth-longest game in NHL history, and longest since 1943, was over after 68:47 of OT (128:47 overall). The Islanders, weary but jubilant, mobbed LaFontaine, and then Hrudey, having won Game 7, 3–2.

Washington had not trailed the series up until that point, nor had they trailed in the game. It is still the longest game in Islanders history and was the longest the Capitals had ever played to that point; the Capitals lost a longer game (79:15 of OT in Game 4) to Pittsburgh in the 1996 Stanley Cup Playoffs.

== Boxscore ==
April 18, 1987	New York Islanders	3-2	Washington Capitals	Capital Centre

Scoring summary
Period	Team	Goal	Assist(s)	Time	Score
1st	WAS	Mike Gartner (4)	Greg Adams, Scott Stevens	19:12	1–0 WAS
2nd	NYI	Patrick Flatley (3)	Steve Konroyd, Bryan Trottier	11:35	1–1
2nd	WAS	Grant Martin (1)	Greg Adams, Larry Murphy	18:45	2–1 WAS
3rd	NYI	Bryan Trottier (5)	Alan Kerr, Steve Konroyd	14:37	2–2
OT	None				
2OT	None				
3OT	None				
4OT	NYI	Pat LaFontaine (4)	Gord Dineen, Ken Leiter	8:47	3–2 NYI

Number in parentheses represents the player's total in goals or assists to that point of the playoffs

Penalty summary
Period	Team	Player	Penalty	Time	PIM
1st	NYI	Steve Konroyd	Hooking	7:36	
1st	NYI	Alan Kerr	Elbowing	19:51	
1st	WAS	Bobby Gould	Holding	19:51	
2nd	NYI	Randy Boyd	Slashing	3:55	
2nd	WAS	John Blum	Cross-checking	3:55	
2nd	NYI	Greg Gilbert	High-sticking	6:04	
2nd	WAS	Ed Kastelic	High-sticking	6:04	
2nd	NYI	Trottier	Holding	14:58	
3rd	WAS	Martin	Holding	1:31	
3rd	NYI	Diduck	High-sticking	10:21	
3rd	WAS	Franceschetti	High-sticking	10:21	
3rd	NYI	Sutter	High-sticking	19:06	
3rd	WAS	Jensen	High-sticking	19:06	
OT	None				
2OT	NYI	Kerr	Slashing	8:46	
2OT	WAS	Stevens	High-sticking	8:46	
2OT	NYI	Flatley	High-sticking	10:49	
2OT	WAS	Duchesne	Cross-checking	10:49	
2OT	WAS	Adams	Misconduct	16:47	
3OT	None				
4OT	None				

Shots by period
Team	1	2	3	OT	2OT	3OT	4OT	Total
NYI	5	5	11	11	9	11	5	57
WAS	15	10	11	11	17	10	1	75

Power play opportunities

	Goals/Opportunities
NY Islanders	0/1
Washington	0/2

Goaltenders

- NYI — Kelly Hrudey
- WAS — Bob Mason

Officials

- Referee — Andy Van Hellemond
- Linesmen — John D'Amico, Ron Finn

== Broadcasting ==
Channel	Play-by-play	Color Commentator
CBC	Bob Cole	Harry Neale
ESPN	Mike Emrick	Bill Clement
SportsChannel New York	Jiggs McDonald	Ed Westfall
Home Team Sports	Mike Fornes	Al Koken

== Epilogue ==
The "Epic" concluded at 1:58 a.m. local time, 6 hours and 18 minutes after the first face-off. Kelly Hrudey stopped 73 shots over the seven periods, including 50 straight from the end of the second period on. Mason stopped 54 shots, including 36 from the end of regulation until LaFontaine beat him to end the marathon.

The Islanders had to regain their composure, as well as their strength, as they advanced to the Patrick Division finals against a rested Philadelphia Flyers squad. They once again fell behind three games to one, and once again tied the series with consecutive victories. However, their luck ran out in Game 7, as Philadelphia won decisively, 5–1, to win the series. The Flyers went on to defeat the Montreal Canadiens in the Wales Conference finals in six games before eventually losing in the Stanley Cup Finals to the Edmonton Oilers.

At the time, the game gave the Islanders franchise the accomplishment of having won both the shortest (0:11 in game 3 of 1975 preliminary series vs. the New York Rangers) and longest overtime series-deciding games in the history of the Stanley Cup playoffs. The longest elimination game mark would be surpassed in 2008 when the sixth and deciding game between the Dallas Stars and the San Jose Sharks took 16 seconds longer than the Easter Epic before the Stars scored to eliminate the Sharks. However, the Islanders still own the distinction of winning the shortest and longest overtime winner-take-all games in playoff history.

== See also ==
- Capitals–Islanders rivalry
- List of the longest NHL overtime games
