= Commanders–Giants rivalry =

National Football League rivalry

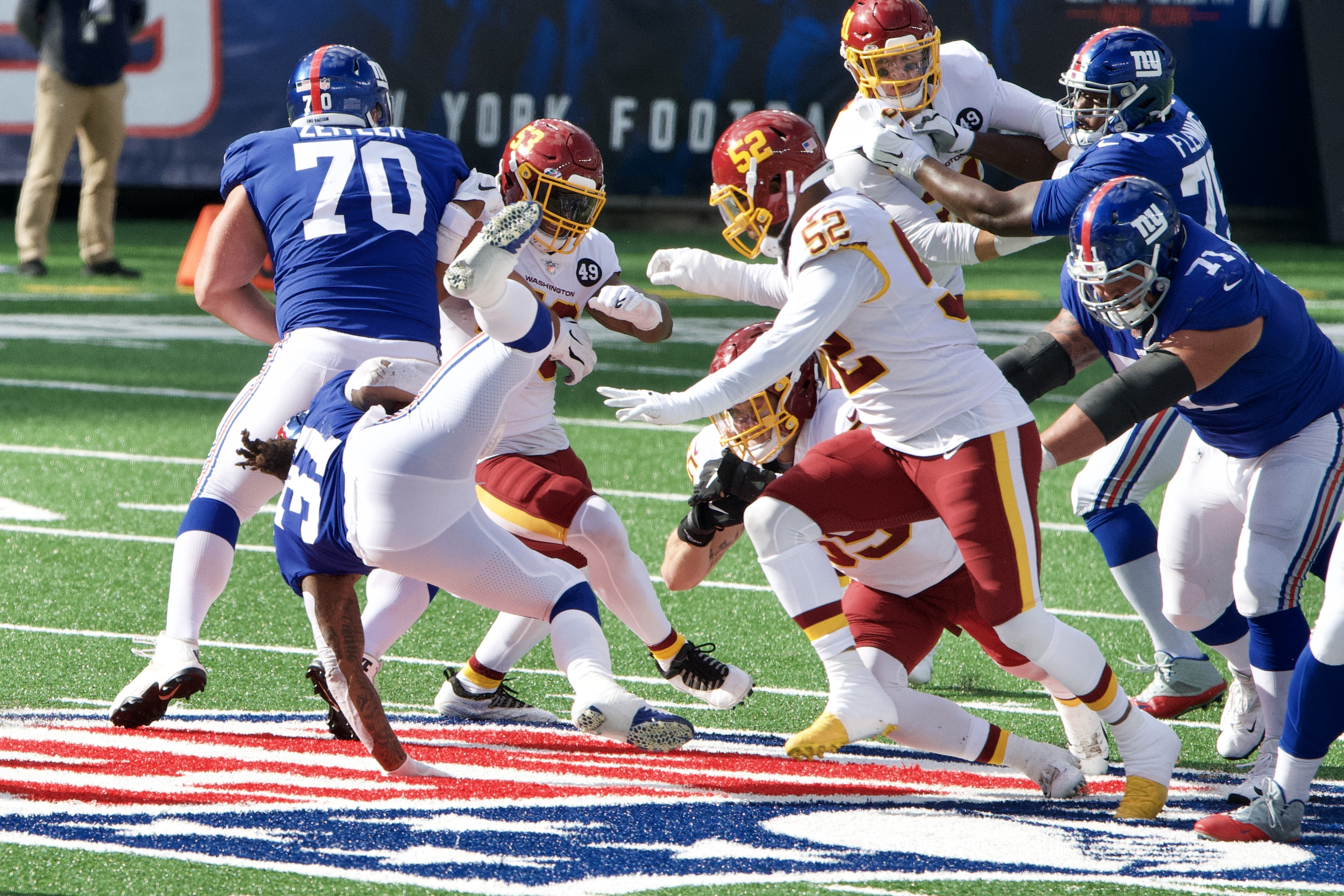
- Washington and Giants face off during the 2020 season.

- Washington Commanders New York Giants
- Location: Washington, D.C., New York City
- First meeting: October 9, 1932; Braves 14, Giants 6
- Latest meeting: November 12, 2026; Commanders 24, Giants 21
- Next meeting: 2027
- Stadiums: Commanders: Northwest Stadium; Giants: MetLife Stadium

Statistics
- Total meetings: 190
- All-time series: Giants: 108–76–6
- Regular season series: Giants: 107–75–6
- Postseason results: Tie: 1–1
- Largest victory: Commanders: 49–13 (1975); Giants: 53–0 (1961)
- Most points scored: Commanders: 72 (1966); Giants: 53 (1961)
- Longest win streak: Commanders: 11 (1971–1976); Giants: 8 (1961–1964)
- Current win streak: Commanders: 1 (2026–present)

Post-season history
- 1943 NFL Eastern Division: Redskins won: 28–0; 1986 NFC Championship: Giants won: 17–0

The Commanders–Giants rivalry, formerly known as the Giants–Redskins rivalry, is a National Football League (NFL) rivalry between the Washington Commanders and New York Giants.

It began in 1932 with the founding of Washington's predecessors, the Boston Braves, and is the oldest rivalry in the NFC East Division. This rivalry has seen periods of great competition such as the Giants and Redskins' competition for conference and division titles in the late 1930s, early 1940s and 1980s. Experts deem the 1980s as the most hotly contested period between these teams, as the Redskins under Joe Gibbs and the Giants under Bill Parcells competed for division titles and Super Bowls. During this span the two teams combined to win 7 NFC East Divisional Titles, 5 Super Bowls and competed in the 1986 NFC Championship Game with the Giants winning 17–0. This rivalry is storied and Wellington Mara, long time owner of the Giants, always said that he believed the Redskins were the Giants' truest rival.

The Giants lead the overall series, 108–76–6. The two teams have met twice in the playoffs, winning one each.

== Notable rivalry moments ==
- In 1937, their first season in Washington, D.C., the Washington Redskins were set to meet the New York Giants in the season finale in New York City at the Polo Grounds with the winner earning the right to play in the NFL Championship. The owner of the Washington Redskins, George Preston Marshall, loaded 12,000 fans and a 150 piece marching band onto trains and had them march an impromptu parade through New York City, all the while belting out "Hail to the Redskins". The tactic appeared to work as the Redskins went on to beat the Giants 49–14, going on to defeat the Chicago Bears in the 1937 NFL Championship.
- The Giants paid the Redskins back in 1938 with a 36–0 victory of their own, a win which propelled them to their own victory in the 1938 NFL Championship.
- In 1939 the Giants and Redskins again met in the last game of the season. Having tied in their first meeting 0–0 and having identical records (8–1–1) the two teams were playing for a spot in the NFL Championship game. The game was very competitive and the Redskins trailed 9–7 in the final moments. The Redskins attempted a field goal in the last seconds, seemingly giving them a victory. However, the field goal was called no good allowing the Giants to escape with a victory. The Redskins were irate, with one player even punching referee Bill Haloran. The outcome was so controversial that rumor has it George Preston Marshall, the Redskins owner, tried to pull strings to get Haloran fired from his day job as post master of Providence R.I., unsuccessfully. The Giants went on to lose the NFL Championship to the Green Bay Packers 27–0.
- On November 27, 1966 the Giants and Redskins participated in the highest combined scoring game in NFL history. The two teams combined for 16 touchdowns, 9 of which were of 30 yards or more. While the game was an offensive frenzy, the most memorable score was a Redskins field goal attempted with a few seconds remaining and the Giants trailing 69–41. Otto Graham, the Redskins head coach, claimed it was called merely to allow his kicker practice, but some claim that the field goal was ordered by Redskins middle linebacker and former Giant Sam Huff out of spite. In either case the final score was 72–41 and with 113 combined points the matchup remains the highest scoring game in league history.
- On November 18, 1985 in a Monday Night Football contest, the Redskins defeated the Giants 23–21. However, the win did not come without a loss as on one play the Redskins ran a flea-flicker, the Giants defense was not fooled by the play and Lawrence Taylor came from the outside and sacked quarterback Joe Theismann. The play is famous as that the sack injured Theismann's leg and effectively ended his career in the NFL. The Redskins missed the playoffs that season.
- The Giants and Redskins met in the playoffs for only second time in the 1986 NFC Championship game. The Giants were coming off a convincing victory over the 49ers in the previous round while the Redskins beat the Bears in the previous week. On a cold and windy day at Giants Stadium, the Giants scored 10 points in the first 10 minutes of the game and never were threatened. The Giants won 17-0, the first time a Joe Gibbs team had been shut out.
- On September 11, 2011 was opening day for the Giants' Super Bowl XLVI championship season of 2011. It also coincided with tenth anniversary of the September 11 attacks; hence the NFL scheduled the Giants and the Redskins to meet that day, as the cities they represent were two metropolitan areas attacked on that day. FedExField was a patriotically and emotionally charged atmosphere as the two rivals took the field. Led by Eli Manning, the Giants took an early 7–0 lead in the first quarter. Washington responded on a Tim Hightower touchdown run in the second. The two teams took a 14–14 tie into halftime. Washington took the lead in the third after Ryan Kerrigan intercepted a pass from Manning and scored. Washington's defense prevented New York from scoring in the second half and the Redskins ended a six-game losing streak to the Giants. The Redskins defeated the Giants at MetLife Stadium in Week 15, their first season sweep of the Giants since 1999.
- In 2012 the rivalry intensified significantly after a special NFL commission headed by Giants owner John Mara imposed a $36 million salary cap penalty on the Redskins (and a smaller one on the Dallas Cowboys) for the organization's approach to structuring contracts in the 2010 NFL season. After beating the Giants, Redskins owner Daniel Snyder within earshot of numerous media personnel, told a team employee that "I hate those motherf***ers" in the victorious locker room after the game.
- On September 25, 2016, the winless Redskins visited the undefeated Giants. This game was significant due to the ongoing feud between star wide receiver Odell Beckham Jr. and cornerback Josh Norman. In the previous season, Norman and Beckham had many on-field scrums during a game when Norman played for the Carolina Panthers. The Redskins won by a score of 29–27, sealing the win on an interception by Su'a Cravens. Beckham had an impressive 7 receptions and 121 yards, but was noticeably frustrated by Norman, and was especially apparent when he took his helmet and hit the kicker's practice net on the sidelines, causing it to fall on him. Giants center Weston Richburg was the first to ever be ejected by the new rule of being ejected after two unsportsmanlike penalties, one of which cost Beckham and the Giants a significant play.
- On November 23, 2017, the Redskins hosted the Giants in their first home Thanksgiving game in franchise history. The game was very defensive throughout, with both teams struggling to get anything going offensively in the first half. In the 3rd quarter, with the game tied 3–3, Kirk Cousins threw a 15-yard touchdown to Jamison Crowder to give the Redskins a 10–3 lead. The Giants tied the game later in the quarter after Janoris Jenkins returned a Cousins' interception 53-yards for a touchdown. The Redskins pulled away late in the fourth quarter with 10 straight points to win 20–10.
- The Giants got their 100th regular season victory over the Redskins on December 9, 2018, winning 40–16 at FedExField.
- On September 15, 2024, the Giants became the first team in NFL history to score three touchdowns, allow no touchdowns and lose in regulation, by a score of 21–18 to the Commanders.

== Season-by-season results ==
New York Giants vs. Washington Redskins/Football Team/Commanders Season-by-Season Results
1930s (Giants, 9–5–2)

Season	Season series	at New York Giants	at Boston Braves Boston/Washington Redskins	Overall series	Notes
1932	Braves 1–0–1	Tie; 0–0	Braves; 14–6	Braves; 1–0–1	Braves join the NFL as an expansion team. Braves' win against the Giants was the franchise's first win. Braves record their first tie result. Only matchups between the teams with the Redskins having the "Braves" nickname.
1933	Tie 1–1	Giants; 7–0	Redskins; 21–20	Redskins; 2–1–1	Braves change their name to "Redskins". Both teams are placed in the NFL Eastern division as the league splits into two divisions. Giants lose 1933 NFL Championship. As of the 2026 season, this remains the last time the Redskins have led the series.
1934	Giants 2–0	Giants; 3–0	Giants; 16–3	Giants; 3–2–1	Giants win 1934 NFL Championship.
1935	Giants 2–0	Giants; 17–6	Giants; 20–12	Giants; 5–2–1	Giants lose 1935 NFL Championship.
1936	Tie 1–1	Redskins; 14–0	Giants; 7–0	Giants; 6–3–1	Last season Reskins played as a Boston-based team. Redskins lose 1936 NFL Championship.
1937	Redskins 2–0	Redskins; 49–14	Redskins; 13–3	Giants; 6–5–1	Redskins relocate to Washington D.C. In New York, Redskins clinch the Eastern Division and eliminate the Giants from playoff contention with their win. Redskins win 1937 NFL Championship.
1938	Giants 2–0	Giants; 36–0	Giants; 10–7	Giants; 8–5–1	Giants win 1938 NFL Championship.
1939	Giants 1–0–1	Giants; 9–7	Tie; 0–0	Giants; 9–5–2	AFter the tie, the Redskins go on a 11-game home winning streak. Giants clinch the Eastern Division and eliminate the Redskins from playoff contention with their win. Giants lose 1939 NFL Championship.

1940s (Giants, 12–9)

Season	Season series	at New York Giants	at Washington Redskins	Overall series	Notes
1940	Tie 1–1	Giants; 21–7	Redskins; 21–7	Giants; 10–6–2	Redskins lose 1940 NFL Championship.
1941	Giants 2–0	Giants; 20–13	Giants; 17–10	Giants; 12–6–2	Giants lose 1941 NFL Championship.
1942	Tie 1–1	Redskins; 14–7	Giants; 14–7	Giants; 13–7–2	Giants' win was the Redskins' only loss in the 1942 season. Redskins win 1942 NFL Championship.
1943	Giants 2–0	Giants; 14–10	Giants; 31–7	Giants; 15–7–2	Giants swept the Redskins in the final two games of the regular season. Both teams finished with 6–3–1 records, setting up a tiebreaker playoff game.
1943 Playoffs	Redskins 1–0	Redskins; 28–0		Giants; 15–8–2	First postseason meeting. NFL Eastern Division. Redskins go on to lose 1943 NFL Championship.
1944	Giants 2–0	Giants; 16–13	Giants; 31–0	Giants; 17–8–2	Giants lose 1944 NFL Championship.
1945	Redskins 2–0	Redskins; 24–14	Redskins; 17–0	Giants; 17–10–2	Redskins lose 1945 NFL Championship.
1946	Tie 1–1	Giants; 31–0	Redskins; 24–14	Giants; 18–11–2	Giants lose 1946 NFL Championship. From 1933–1946, either the Giants or Redskins won the NFL Eastern Division.
1947	Tie 1–1	Giants; 35–10	Redskins; 28–20	Giants; 19–12–2	
1948	Redskins 2–0	Redskins; 28–21	Redskins; 41–10	Giants; 19–14–2	
1949	Giants 2–0	Giants; 23–7	Giants; 45–35	Giants; 21–14–2	

1950s (Giants, 15–5)

Season	Season series	at New York Giants	at Washington Redskins	Overall series	Notes
1950	Giants 2–0	Giants; 24–21	Giants; 21–17	Giants; 23–14–2	As a result of the AAFC–NFL merger, the Giants and Redskins are placed in the NFL American Conference (later renamed the NFL Eastern Conference in the 1953 season.
1951	Giants 2–0	Giants; 28–14	Giants; 35–14	Giants; 25–14–2	
1952	Tie 1–1	Redskins; 27–17	Giants; 14–10	Giants; 26–15–2	
1953	Redskins 2–0	Redskins; 24–21	Redskins; 13–9	Giants; 26–17–2	
1954	Giants 2–0	Giants; 24–7	Giants; 51–21	Giants; 28–17–2	
1955	Giants 2–0	Giants; 35–7	Giants; 27–20	Giants; 30–17–2	
1956	Tie 1–1	Giants; 28–14	Redskins; 33–7	Giants; 31–18–2	Giants move to Yankee Stadium. Giants win 1956 NFL Championship.
1957	Tie 1–1	Redskins; 31–14	Giants; 24–20	Giants; 32–19–2	
1958	Giants 2–0	Giants; 30–0	Giants; 21–14	Giants; 34–19–2	Giants lose 1958 NFL Championship.
1959	Giants 2–0	Giants; 45–14	Giants; 24–10	Giants; 36–19–2	Giants lose 1959 NFL Championship.

1960s (Giants, 12–5–1)

Season	Season series	at New York Giants	at Washington Redskins	Overall series	Notes
1960	Giants 1–0–1	Tie; 24–24	Giants; 17–3	Giants; 37–19–3	
1961	Giants 2–0	Giants; 53–0	Giants; 24–21	Giants; 39–19–3	Redskins open D.C. Stadium (now known as Robert F. Kennedy Memorial Stadium). In New York, Giants record their largest victory over the Redskins with a 53–point differential and score their most points in a game against the Redskins. Giants lose 1961 NFL Championship.
1962	Giants 2–0	Giants; 49–34	Giants; 42–24	Giants; 41–19–3	In New York, Giants accumulated 602 yards, setting a franchise record for most yards in a game (broken in 2012). Giants lose 1962 NFL Championship.
1963	Giants 2–0	Giants; 44–14	Giants; 24–14	Giants; 43–19–3	Giants lose 1963 NFL Championship.
1964	Tie 1–1	Giants; 13–10	Redskins; 36–21	Giants; 44–20–3	Giants win eight straight meetings (1960–1964).
1965	Tie 1–1	Redskins; 23–7	Giants; 27–10	Giants; 45–21–3	
1966	Tie 1–1	Giants; 13–10	Redskins; 72–41	Giants; 46–22–3	In Washington, Redskins set an NFL record for most points scored by one team and the game's final score is the highest-scoring game in NFL history (113 points). Giants win was their only win in their 1966 season.
1967	Redskins 1–0	no game	Redskins; 38–34	Giants; 46–23–3	NFL expansion results in a split of each conference into two divisions. The Redskins are placed in the Capitol Division, while the Giants and New Orleans Saints alternate between the Capitol and Century Divisions each year. This resulted in only a single meeting between the Giants and Redskins in 1967 and 1969.
1968	Giants 2–0	Giants; 48–21	Giants; 13–10	Giants; 48–23–3	
1969	Redskins 1–0	no game	Redskins; 20–14	Giants; 48–24–3	

1970s (Redskins, 13–7)

Season	Season series	at New York Giants	at Washington Redskins	Overall series	Notes
1970	Giants 2–0	Giants; 35–33	Giants; 27–24	Giants; 50–24–3	As a result of the AFL–NFL merger, the Giants and Redskins are placed in the National Football Conference (NFC) and the NFC East, once again becoming divisional rivals. In New York, Giants overcame a 33–14 fourth quarter deficit.
1971	Redskins 2–0	Redskins; 30–3	Redskins; 23–7	Giants; 50–26–3	Redskins' first season series sweep against the Giants since the 1953 season.
1972	Redskins 2–0	Redskins; 23–16	Redskins; 27–13	Giants; 50–28–3	Redskins lose Super Bowl VII.
1973	Redskins 2–0	Redskins; 21–3	Redskins; 27–24	Giants; 50–30–3	Due to renovations at Yankee Stadium, Giants temporarily play at Yale Bowl in New Haven, Connecticut. In Washington, Redskins overcame a 21–3 deficit.
1974	Redskins 2–0	Redskins; 13–10	Redskins; 24–3	Giants; 50–32–3	Giants home was played at Yale Bowl.
1975	Redskins 2–0	Redskins; 21–13	Redskins; 49–13	Giants; 50–34–3	Giants home game was played at Shea Stadium in New York. In Washington, Redskins record their largest victory over the Giants with a 36–point differential.
1976	Tie 1–1	Giants; 12–9	Redskins; 19–17	Giants; 51–35–3	Giants open Giants Stadium in East Rutherford, New Jersey. Redskins win 11 straight meetings (1971–1976). Giants get their first win of the season after starting 0–9.
1977	Giants 2–0	Giants; 20–17	Giants; 17–6	Giants; 53–35–3	
1978	Tie 1–1	Giants; 17–6	Redskins; 16–13 (OT)	Giants; 54–36–3	
1979	Tie 1–1	Giants; 14–6	Redskins; 27–0	Giants; 55–37–3	

1980s (Redskins, 11–10)

Season	Season series	at New York Giants	at Washington Redskins	Overall series	Notes
1980	Redskins 2–0	Redskins; 23–21	Redskins; 16–13	Giants; 55–39–3	
1981	Tie 1–1	Redskins; 30–27 (OT)	Giants; 17–7	Giants; 56–40–3	
1982	Redskins 2–0	Redskins; 27–17	Redskins; 15–14	Giants; 56–42–3	Both games played despite players strike reducing the season to 9 games. Game in New York marked the 100th meeting. Redskins win Super Bowl XVII.
1983	Redskins 2–0	Redskins; 33–17	Redskins; 31-22	Giants; 56–44–3	Redskins lose Super Bowl XVIII.
1984	Tie 1–1	Giants; 37–13	Redskins; 30–14	Giants; 57–45–3	
1985	Tie 1–1	Giants; 17–3	Redskins; 23–21	Giants; 58–46–3	In Washington, a sack by Giants LB Lawrence Taylor fractured Redskins QB Joe Theismann's right leg and effectively ended his NFL career. Both teams finished with 10–6 records, but the Giants clinched a playoff berth based on a better conference record, thereby eliminating the Redskins from playoff contention.
1986	Giants 2–0	Giants; 27–20	Giants; 24–14	Giants; 60–46–3	Giants win Super Bowl XXI.
1986 Playoffs	Giants 1–0	Giants; 17–0		Giants; 61–46–3	Second postseason meeting. NFC Championship Game. Giants go on to win Super Bowl XXI.
1987	Redskins 2–0	Redskins; 38–12	Redskins; 23–19	Giants; 61–48–3	In Washington, Redskins overcame a 19–3 second half deficit. Redskins win Super Bowl XXII.
1988	Giants 2–0	Giants; 27–20	Giants; 24–23	Giants; 63–48–3	
1989	Giants 2–0	Giants; 20–17	Giants; 27–24	Giants; 65–48–3	

1990s (Giants, 11–8–1)

Season	Season series	at New York Giants	at Washington Redskins	Overall series	Notes
1990	Giants 2–0	Giants; 21–10	Giants; 24–20	Giants; 67–48–3	Giants win Super Bowl XXV.
1991	Redskins 2–0	Redskins; 17–13	Redskins; 34–17	Giants; 67–50–3	Redskins win Super Bowl XXVI.
1992	Tie 1–1	Redskins; 28–10	Giants; 24–7	Giants; 68–51–3	
1993	Giants 2–0	Giants; 20–6	Giants; 41–7	Giants; 70–51–3	
1994	Giants 2–0	Giants; 31–23	Giants; 21–19	Giants; 72–51–3	
1995	Giants 2–0	Giants; 20–13	Giants; 24–15	Giants; 74–51–3	
1996	Redskins 2–0	Redskins; 31–10	Redskins; 31–21	Giants; 74–53–3	
1997	Giants 1–0–1	Giants; 30–10	Tie; 7–7 (OT)	Giants; 75–53–4	Redskins open Jack Kent Cooke Stadium (now known as Northwest Stadium). First tie game in the series since the 1974 introduction of overtime. Giants clinch the NFC East with their win.
1998	Tie 1–1	Giants; 31–24	Redskins; 21–14	Giants; 76–54–4	
1999	Redskins 2–0	Redskins; 50–21	Redskins; 23–13	Giants; 76–56–4	

2000s (Giants, 14–6)

Season	Season series	at New York Giants	at Washington Redskins	Overall series	Notes
2000	Tie 1–1	Redskins; 16–6	Giants; 9–7	Giants; 77–57–4	Giants lose Super Bowl XXXV.
2001	Tie 1–1	Giants; 23–9	Redskins; 35–21	Giants; 78–58–4	
2002	Giants 2–0	Giants; 19–17	Giants; 27–21	Giants; 80–58–4	
2003	Tie 1–1	Redskins; 20–7	Giants; 24–21 (OT)	Giants; 81–59–4	
2004	Tie 1–1	Giants; 20–14	Redskins; 31–7	Giants; 82–60–4	Giants draft QB Eli Manning.
2005	Tie 1–1	Giants; 36–0	Redskins; 35–20	Giants; 83–61–4	
2006	Giants 2–0	Giants; 19–3	Giants; 34–28	Giants; 85–61–4	
2007	Tie 1–1	Redskins; 22–10	Giants; 24–17	Giants; 86–62–4	Giants win Super Bowl XLII.
2008	Giants 2–0	Giants; 16–7	Giants; 23–7	Giants; 88–62–4	Game in New York was the NFL Kickoff Game.
2009	Giants 2–0	Giants; 23–17	Giants; 45–12	Giants; 90–62–4	

2010s (Giants, 13–7)

Season	Season series	at New York Giants	at Washington Redskins	Overall series	Notes
2010	Giants 2–0	Giants; 31–7	Giants; 17–14	Giants; 92–62–4	Giants open New Meadowlands Stadium (now known as MetLife Stadium).
2011	Redskins 2–0	Redskins; 23–10	Redskins; 28–14	Giants; 92–64–4	Redskins sweep the season series against the Giants for the first time since the 1999 season. Giants win Super Bowl XLVI.
2012	Tie 1–1	Giants; 27–23	Redskins; 17–16	Giants; 93–65–4	
2013	Giants 2–0	Giants; 20–6	Giants; 24–17	Giants; 95–65–4	
2014	Giants 2–0	Giants; 24–13	Giants; 45–14	Giants; 97–65–4	
2015	Tie 1–1	Giants; 32–21	Redskins; 20–14	Giants; 98–66–4	
2016	Tie 1–1	Redskins; 29–27	Giants; 19–10	Giants; 99–67–4	Giants eliminate the Redskins from playoff contention with their win.
2017	Tie 1–1	Giants; 18–10	Redskins; 20–10	Giants; 100–68–4	Game in Washington was played on Thanksgiving. Giants record their 100th win over the Redskins, becoming only the second team in NFL history to record 100 wins over a single opponent (joining the Green Bay Packers, who defeated the Detroit Lions 100 times).
2018	Tie 1–1	Redskins; 20–13	Giants; 40–16	Giants; 101–69–4	
2019	Giants 2–0	Giants; 24–3	Giants; 41–35 (OT)	Giants; 103–69–4	Final season for Giants' QB Eli Manning.

2020s (Commanders, 7–5–2)

Season	Season series	at New York Giants	at Washington Football Team/Commanders	Overall series	Notes
2020	Giants 2–0	Giants; 20–19	Giants; 23–20	Giants; 105–69–4	After decades of controversy, Washington retired the "Redskins" name and temporarily adopted the title "Washington Football Team".
2021	Washington 2–0	Washington; 22–7	Washington; 30–29	Giants; 105–71–4	In Washington, Washington's K Dustin Hopkins missed the game-winning field goal, but a Giants offside gave him another chance, which he successfully made. Washington's first season series sweep against the Giants since the 2011 season.
2022	Giants 1–0–1	Tie; 20–20 (OT)	Giants; 20–12	Giants; 106–71–5	Washington Football Team adopts the "Commanders" name. First tie result since the 1997 season.
2023	Giants 2–0	Giants; 14–7	Giants; 31–19	Giants; 108–71–5	
2024	Commanders 2–0	Commanders; 27–22	Commanders; 21–18	Giants; 108–73–5	Commanders draft QB Jayden Daniels
2025	Commanders 2–0	Commanders; 29–21	Commanders; 21–6	Giants; 108–75–5	
2026	Commanders 1–0–1	Commanders; 24–21	Tie; 27–27 (OT)	Giants; 108–76–6	In Washington, the Giants overcame a 27–13 fourth-quarter deficit to force overtime. In OT, Giants RB Cam Skattebo fumbled at Washington's 24-yard line, preventing a potential game-winning field goal attempt. The Commanders then drove into field goal range but failed to stop the clock in time, leading to a tie.

Summary of Results

Season	Season series	at New York Giants	at Boston Braves Boston/Washington Redskins Washington Football Team/Commanders	Notes
Regular season	Giants 107–75–6	Giants 57–33–3	Giants 50–42–3	
Postseason	Tie 1–1	Tie 1–1	no games	NFL Eastern Division: 1943; NFC Championship: 1986
Regular and postseason	Giants 108–76–6	Giants 58–34–3	Giants 50–42–3	Giants have a 3–2 record in Boston. Redskins/Commanders have a 2–0 record at Yale Bowl in New Haven, Connecticut (1973), (1974), both accounted for as Giants' home games.

== Players who played for both teams ==
Name	Position(s)	Time with Commanders	Time with Giants
Norm Snead	Quarterback	1961–1963	1972–1974
Sam Huff	Linebacker	1964–1969	1956–1963
Nick Gates	Center	2023	2018–2022
Jessie Armstead	Linebacker	2002–2003	1993–2001
Greg Stroman	Cornerback	2018–2020	2024
Joe Walton	End/Defensive end	1957–1960	1961–1964
Fabian Moreau	Cornerback	2017–2020	2022
Renaldo Wynn	Defensive end	2002–2006, 2009	2008
Ryan Clark	Safety	2004–2005	2002–2003
Ken MacAfee	End	1959	1954–1958
Ereck Flowers	Offensive tackle/Guard	2019, 2021	2015–2018
Barry Cofield	Defensive tackle	2011–2014	2006–2010, 2015
Kent Graham	Quarterback	2001	1992–1994, 1998–1999
Colt McCoy	Quarterback	2014–2019	2020
Antonio Pierce	Linebacker	2001–2004	2005–2009
Graham Gano	Placekicker	2009–2011	2020–2025
Alfred Morris	Running back	2012–2015	2020
David Mayo	Linebacker	2021–2023	2019–2020
Jeff Rutledge	Quarterback	1990–1992	1983–1989
Brian Mitchell	Running back	1990–1999	2003
Landon Collins	Safety/linebacker	2019–2021	2015–2018
Devin Thomas	Wide receiver	2008–2010	2010–2011
Dominique Rodgers-Cromartie	Cornerback	2019	2014–2017

== See also ==
- List of NFL rivalries
- NFC East
- Capitals–Islanders rivalry
- N.Y. Red Bulls–D.C. United rivalry
