= Joel Otto =

American ice hockey player (born 1961)

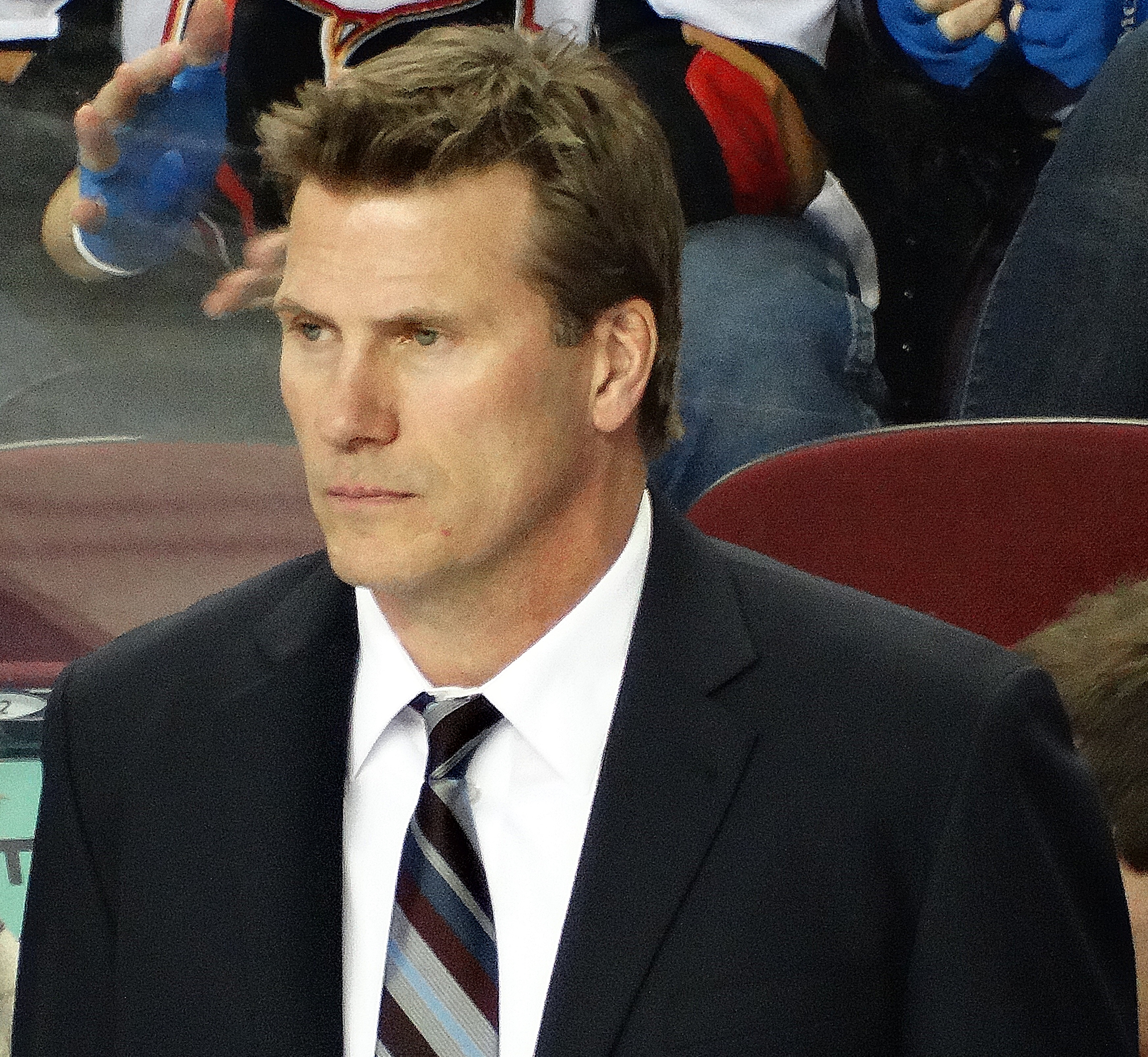
- Otto in 2014
- Born: October 29, 1961 (age 64) Elk River, Minnesota, U.S.
- Height: 6 ft 4 in (193 cm)
- Weight: 220 lb (100 kg; 15 st 10 lb)
- Position: Center
- Shot: Right
- Played for: Calgary Flames; Philadelphia Flyers
- National team: United States
- NHL draft: Undrafted
- Playing career: 1984–1998

Joel Stuart Otto (born October 29, 1961) is an American former professional ice hockey player who was a center in the National Hockey League (NHL) for the Calgary Flames and Philadelphia Flyers. An undrafted player, Otto signed with the Flames as a free agent in 1984 and played 11 seasons with the team. He was one of the top defensive centers in the league during his career and one of the NHL's best at faceoffs; Otto was a two-time finalist for the Frank J. Selke Trophy. He was known for his confrontations with Mark Messier as part of the Flames' rivalry with the Edmonton Oilers and was a member of Calgary's 1989 Stanley Cup championship winning team. He joined the Flyers in 1995, with whom he played three seasons.

Otto was a frequent member of the United States national team. He played in two World Championships and two Canada Cups, captaining the United States to the final in 1991. Otto was a member of the team that won the inaugural World Cup of Hockey in 1996 and played in the 1998 Winter Olympics. He currently serves as an assistant coach of the Western Hockey League's Calgary Hitmen, with whom he won the league championship in 2010.

== Playing career ==
=== College ===
A native of Elk River, Minnesota, Otto played college hockey for Division II school Bemidji State. He scored 52 points in 31 games in his sophomore season of 1981–82, improving to 61 points the following season and finally 75 points in 31 games in 1983–84. He was named to the Northern Collegiate Hockey Association (NCHA) first All-Conference Team and National Collegiate Athletic Association (NCAA) West All-American in 1982, 1983 and 1984. Otto captained Bemidji State in 1983–84, leading the team to an undefeated record at 31–0 and a Division II national championship. He was recognized as the NCHA player of the year in 1984. He was a finalist for the Hobey Baker Award in 1984, given to the top collegiate player in the United States. Otto scored over 200 points for Bemidji State, was the first player to have his jersey retired by the school, and was inducted into Bemidji State's Athletics Hall of Fame in 2010.

=== Calgary Flames ===
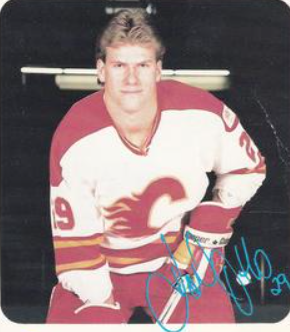
1986 card of Otto for Calgary Flames

"I respected him. Did I like him? I'm sure he's a wonderful man but... Well, there wasn't a lot of idle chit-chat between us. A few swear words, I guess. But I owe him my career in a way."

— Otto, speaking of his battles with Mark Messier

Otto was never drafted, and upon graduation, sought opportunities from National Hockey League (NHL) clubs. The teams he contacted offered only a try-out, some insisting he pay his own way. Finally, his agent contacted Cliff Fletcher, general manager of the Calgary Flames, who offered him a contract to play for the Moncton Golden Flames, their American Hockey League (AHL) affiliate. Otto agreed, scored 63 points in 56 games for the Golden Flames in the 1984–85 AHL season and appeared in 17 games with Calgary. He made his NHL debut on November 23, 1984, against the St. Louis Blues. On March 1, 1985, he recorded his first point, an assist, against the Montreal Canadiens. He scored his first goal two nights later against goaltender Darren Eliot of the Los Angeles Kings.

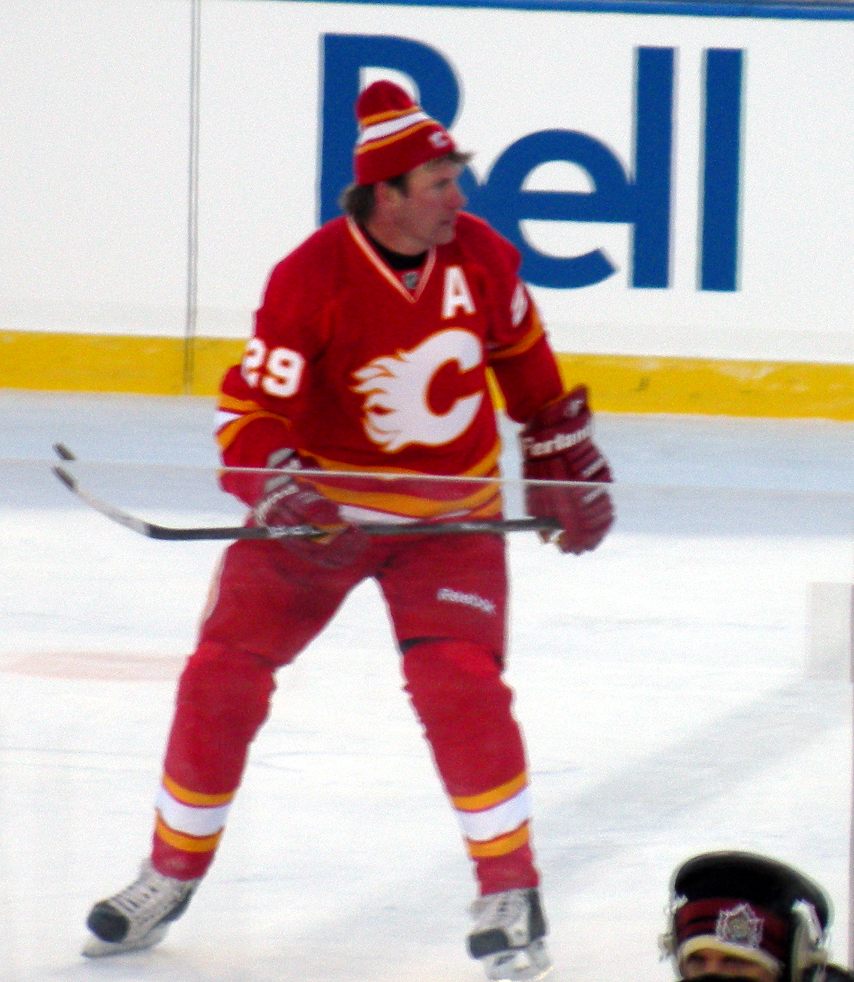
Otto, pictured playing with the alumni team at the 2011 Heritage Classic, spent the majority of his NHL career with the Flames.

Otto established himself as a top defensive forward for the Flames in 1985–86. Coach Bob Johnson discovered his niche when he had Otto shut down Marcel Dionne, the top player of the Los Angeles Kings. Afterward, Otto was consistently used against the opposition's top line where he used his size and faceoff ability to his advantage. He was most famous for shadowing Mark Messier of the Edmonton Oilers when the Battle of Alberta reached its peak in the late 1980s. Otto later remarked that Messier was the reason he was in the NHL, as the Flames needed a big center who could match Messier physically, especially in the faceoff circle.

Johnson also used Otto in front of the opposition net to screen the goaltender. He struggled offensively early in the 1985–86 season, scoring only two goals in the first third of the year, but as he grew in confidence and saw increasing ice time, his offense improved. Otto finished the season with 25 goals and 59 points. He added 5 goals and 15 points in the playoffs as the Flames reached the Stanley Cup Final. The Flames lost the series in five games to the Montreal Canadiens.

Continuing to chip in on offense in the following seasons, Otto scored at least 50 points in each of his first four full seasons. He reached the 20-goal mark for the second time in 1988–89, a season he ended on an 11-game point scoring streak. The Flames entered the 1989 Stanley Cup Playoffs as the top team in the NHL, and a prohibitive favorite against their first round opponent, the Vancouver Canucks. Nonetheless, the Canucks forced the Flames into overtime of the seventh and deciding game of the series. Late in the first overtime period, Otto rushed toward the net as Jim Peplinski carried the puck up the right side boards. Peplinski's shot was kicked-in by Otto past Vancouver goaltender Kirk McLean. Otto was credited with the series-winning goal. He scored a total of 19 points in 22 playoff games as the Flames won their first Stanley Cup championship in franchise history.

Considered one of the league's best faceoff men and a top two-way forward, Otto was frequently the subject of inquiries by other teams in trade talks, which the Flames refused. He scored his 100th career goal on October 30, 1990, against the New Jersey Devils and his 300th point on October 4, 1991, against Edmonton. He was the Flames' nominee for the Bill Masterton Memorial Trophy in 1991–92, a league award given for dedication and perseverance. His role with the Flames changed into the 1990s as the team placed greater emphasis on his defensive play into the 1990s, though he surpassed 50-points for the fifth time in 1992–93. Otto was also named a finalist for the Frank J. Selke Trophy as the league's top defensive forward that season. He was again named a finalist for the Selke Trophy in 1994–95.

=== Philadelphia Flyers ===
Otto hoped to remain in Calgary after his contract expired following the 1995 season, but with the Flames facing financial difficulties as the NHL's salary structure rapidly changed, the team was unable to agree to a new contract. He was among the most sought after players in free agency, and was pursued by the New York Rangers, who hoped that he could help their team shut down Eric Lindros of the Philadelphia Flyers. Otto considered the offer, and thought if the Rangers thought that highly of their opponent, he would be better off playing with Lindros than against him. Otto signed a three-year contract with the Philadelphia Flyers on July 21, 1995.

He scored 41 points in 67 games in 1995–96, including the 500th of his career, when he notched a goal and an assist in a 5–4 win over the Edmonton Oilers on March 13, 1997. Still regarded as one of the league's top defensive centers in 1996–97, Otto helped the Flyers reach the 1997 Stanley Cup Final, which they lost to the Detroit Red Wings. He scored only 7 points in 68 games in 1997–98 after recording 32 the season before, and had lost some of his skating speed. Following the season, Otto announced his retirement.

=== International ===
Otto made his debut with the United States national team at the 1985 World Ice Hockey Championships. He appeared in ten games, scoring two goals. His goal against Czechoslovakia helped the US complete its third of three consecutive upset victories, including defeats of Canada and Sweden, that left the United States in second place after the preliminary round. The Americans ultimately finished fourth in the tournament. Otto played in a second World Championship in 1990, scoring six points in nine games for the fifth-place Americans.

The 1987 Canada Cup was Otto's first appearance in a best-on-best tournament. He appeared in five games for the fifth-place Americans, and returned as the captain of the American squad that entered the 1991 Canada Cup. Otto scored two goals in a 7–3 victory over Finland in the semi-final to lead the United States into its first championship game in five Canada Cup appearances. The Americans lost the best-of-three final to Canada 2–0. Otto next appeared in the 1996 World Cup of Hockey, the successor tournament to the Canada Cup, where the Americans again faced Canada in the final. Otto and his teammates defeated Canada to claim the inaugural World Cup title. His final international appearance came at the 1998 Winter Olympics. At 36, Otto was the oldest player on the American team and was counted on to contribute to the American team as a checking center. He appeared in four games for the sixth-place Americans.

== Off the ice ==
Otto and his wife Kary have two children together. The family settled in Calgary, but return to Minnesota for various events. Following his retirement as a player, Otto worked for Calgary law firm MacLeod Dixon as a professional player consultant and later for a company that manufactured golf clubs. Otto is active within the community. As a player with the Flames, he was a spokesman for the Calgary Children's Milk Fund Society, and was named the recipient of the Ralph T. Scurfield Humanitarian Award in 1993 in recognition of his leadership and community involvement. Otto remains active with the Calgary Flames Alumni Association and in 2004 joined the Calgary Hitmen of the Western Hockey League (WHL) as a spokesman for their "Hitmen Kidz" community program.

While he had worked with the University of Calgary Dinos hockey program for a couple seasons following his retirement, Otto left to be closer to his family. He returned to the game in 2006 as an assistant coach for the Hitmen. He helped coach the Hitmen to the Ed Chynoweth Cup as WHL champions in 2009–10, and returned for his fifth season behind the bench in 2011–12.

== Career statistics ==
=== Regular season and playoffs ===
			Regular season					Playoffs
Season	Team	League	GP	G	A	Pts	PIM	GP	G	A	Pts	PIM
1980–81	Elk River High School	HS-MN	23	5	11	16	10	—	—	—	—	—
1981–82	Bemidji State Beavers	NCHA	31	19	33	52	24	—	—	—	—	—
1982–83	Bemidji State Beavers	NCHA	37	33	28	61	68	—	—	—	—	—
1983–84	Bemidji State Beavers	NCHA	31	32	43	75	32	—	—	—	—	—
1984–85	Moncton Golden Flames	AHL	56	27	36	63	89	—	—	—	—	—
1984–85	Calgary Flames	NHL	17	4	8	12	30	3	2	1	3	10
1985–86	Calgary Flames	NHL	79	25	34	59	188	22	5	10	15	80
1986–87	Calgary Flames	NHL	68	19	31	50	185	2	0	2	2	6
1987–88	Calgary Flames	NHL	62	13	39	52	194	9	3	2	5	24
1988–89	Calgary Flames	NHL	72	23	30	53	213	22	6	13	19	46
1989–90	Calgary Flames	NHL	75	13	20	33	116	6	2	2	4	2
1990–91	Calgary Flames	NHL	76	19	20	39	183	7	1	2	3	8
1991–92	Calgary Flames	NHL	78	13	21	34	161	—	—	—	—	—
1992–93	Calgary Flames	NHL	75	19	33	52	150	6	4	2	6	4
1993–94	Calgary Flames	NHL	81	11	12	23	92	3	0	1	1	4
1994–95	Calgary Flames	NHL	47	8	13	21	130	7	0	3	3	2
1995–96	Philadelphia Flyers	NHL	67	12	29	41	115	12	3	4	7	11
1996–97	Philadelphia Flyers	NHL	78	13	19	32	99	18	1	5	6	8
1997–98	Philadelphia Flyers	NHL	68	3	4	7	78	5	0	0	0	0
NHL totals			943	195	313	508	1,934	122	22	47	74	205

=== International ===
Year	Team	Event	GP	G	A	Pts	PIM
1985	United States	WC	10	2	1	3	8
1987	United States	CC	5	0	2	2	4
1990	United States	WC	9	2	4	6	2
1991	United States	CC	8	4	0	4	2
1996	United States	WCH	7	1	2	3	6
1998	United States	OG	4	0	0	0	0
Senior totals			43	9	9	18	22

== Curiosities ==
Canadian punk band Belvedere wrote a song about Joel Otto's career called "Two minutes for looking so good".

Awards and achievements
Preceded by Dave Burkholder	NCAA Tournament Most Outstanding Player; 1984	Succeeded by Award Discontinued
