= Bob Mason (ice hockey) =

American ice hockey player

- Born: April 22, 1961 (age 65) International Falls, Minnesota, U.S.
- Height: 6 ft 1 in (185 cm)
- Weight: 180 lb (82 kg; 12 st 12 lb)
- Position: Goaltender
- Caught: Right
- Played for: Washington Capitals; Chicago Blackhawks; Quebec Nordiques; Vancouver Canucks
- National team: United States
- Playing career: 1984–1995

Robert Thomas Mason (born April 22, 1961) is an American former professional ice hockey goaltender. During his career he played in the National Hockey League (NHL) for the Washington Capitals, Chicago Blackhawks, Quebec Nordiques, and Vancouver Canucks, while also playing for several teams in the minor American Hockey League and International Hockey League, in a career that lasted from 1984 to 1995. With the Capitals he played in the Easter Epic, a 1987 NHL playoff game. Internationally Mason played for the American national team at the 1984 Winter Olympics. Mason is the former goaltending coach of the Minnesota Wild.

== Playing career ==
Mason had a stellar college career at the University of Minnesota-Duluth, culminating in a 1982–83 season in which he was named WCHA Player of the Year. Following the conclusion of his college career, he spent a season with the US National Team, and was a member of the US squad at the 1984 Winter Olympics in Sarajevo.

Never drafted, Mason was signed by the Washington Capitals at the conclusion of the Olympics. Assigned to the AHL, he was called up for two starts for Washington before the end of the 1983-84 season, winning them both and establishing himself as a top prospect for the team.

Mason would spend most of his first two professional seasons in the AHL with the Binghamton Whalers, trapped behind the experienced Washington duo of Pat Riggin and Al Jensen who had combined to win the 1984 Jennings Trophy. When he was recalled to the NHL, he excelled, posting an 8-2-1 record with a 2.81 GAA in 12 appearances in 1984-85 and winning his only start in 1985-86.

For the 1986-87 season, Mason was finally given a chance to stick in the NHL and responded in fine fashion, making 45 appearances and finishing amongst the top starters in the league in goals-against average and save percentage. He continued his strong play as Washington faced the New York Islanders in the playoffs, a series which would stretch to a 7th game. A quadruple-overtime thriller dubbed the Easter Epic as the game stretched past midnight into Easter Sunday, the final game of the series was the longest playoff overtime game in the NHL since 1951 and remains the longest Game 7 in NHL history. Mason made 54 saves total including 36 straight from the start of overtime in an epic goaltending duel with Kelly Hrudey before ultimately conceding the winning goal on a screened slapshot by Pat Lafontaine, eliminating the Capitals.

Mason would experience another highlight in the summer of 1987 when he was selected to the American team for the 1987 Canada Cup, although he didn't see any action as the 3rd goaltender on the roster behind superstars John Vanbiesbrouck and Tom Barrasso.

Mason left Washington during the 1987 offseason to sign with the Chicago Blackhawks. He entered the 1987-88 season as the team's starting netminder, but was usurped by rookie Darren Pang as the season went along. He finished the season with 41 appearances, but his numbers dropped off considerably from his time in Washington and he was traded to the Quebec Nordiques at the conclusion of the year.

After leaving Chicago, Mason's career was never able to regain momentum. He spent the 1988-89 season with Quebec, but after struggling to start the year found himself in the minors by the end of the season. He was re-acquired by Washington for the 1989-90 to serve as backup to Don Beaupre but was unable to recapture the form he showed in his first stint and released at the end of the year.

Mason signed with the Vancouver Canucks in 1990 to serve as goaltending depth, and spent three years in Vancouver's system primarily with their Milwaukee Admirals farm team, making a 6-game cameo in 1990-91 which would prove to be his final NHL action. After being released by Vancouver in 1993, he spent two more years in the IHL in Milwaukee before retiring in 1995.

== Coaching career ==
Following his retirement, Mason returned home to Minnesota and served as a volunteer goaltending coach at the University of Minnesota from 1996 until 1999. He was then hired as goaltending consultant for the expansion Atlanta Thrashers as they entered the NHL, serving in that position through 2001.

Mason was hired as goaltending coach for the Minnesota Wild in 2002 and remained in the position under three different head coaches before being relieved of his duties on August 10, 2020. His time with Minnesota was highlighted by the 2006-07 Jennings Trophy win for Wild goalies Niklas Bäckström and Manny Fernandez.

== Career statistics ==
=== Regular season and playoffs ===
			Regular season									Playoffs
Season	Team	League	GP	W	L	T	MIN	GA	SO	GAA	SV%	GP	W	L	MIN	GA	SO	GAA	SV%
1979–80	Green Bay Bobcats	USHL	—	—	—	—	—	—	—	—	—	—	—	—	—	—	—	—	—
1980–81	Green Bay Bobcats	USHL	—	—	—	—	—	—	—	—	—	—	—	—	—	—	—	—	—
1981–82	University of Minnesota-Duluth	WCHA	27	9	15	3	1401	115	0	4.45	.861	—	—	—	—	—	—	—	—
1982–83	University of Minnesota-Duluth	WCHA	43	26	16	1	2594	151	1	3.49	.894	—	—	—	—	—	—	—	—
1983–84	Washington Capitals	NHL	2	2	0	0	120	3	0	1.50	.935	—	—	—	—	—	—	—	—
1983–84	Hershey Bears	AHL	5	1	4	0	282	26	0	5.53	—	—	—	—	—	—	—	—	—
1984–85	Washington Capitals	NHL	12	8	2	1	660	31	1	2.82	.893	—	—	—	—	—	—	—	—
1984–85	Binghamton Whalers	AHL	20	10	6	1	1052	58	1	3.31	—	—	—	—	—	—	—	—	—
1985–86	Washington Capitals	NHL	1	0	1	0	16	0	0	0.00	1.000	—	—	—	—	—	—	—	—
1985–86	Binghamton Whalers	AHL	34	20	11	2	1940	126	0	3.90	—	3	1	1	124	9	0	4.35	—
1986–87	Washington Capitals	NHL	45	20	18	5	2525	137	0	3.25	.890	4	2	2	307	9	1	1.76	.937
1986–87	Binghamton Whalers	AHL	2	1	1	0	119	4	0	2.02	—	—	—	—	—	—	—	—	—
1987–88	Chicago Blackhawks	NHL	41	13	18	8	2309	160	0	4.16	.882	1	0	1	60	3	0	3.00	.903
1988–89	Quebec Nordiques	NHL	22	5	14	1	1168	92	0	4.72	.853	—	—	—	—	—	—	—	—
1988–89	Halifax Citadels	AHL	23	11	7	1	1278	73	1	3.43	—	2	0	2	97	9	0	5.57	—
1989–90	Washington Capitals	NHL	16	4	9	1	822	48	0	3.50	.875	—	—	—	—	—	—	—	—
1989–90	Baltimore Skipjacks	AHL	13	9	2	2	770	44	0	3.43	—	6	2	4	373	20	0	3.22	—
1990–91	Vancouver Canucks	NHL	6	2	4	0	353	29	0	4.92	.846	—	—	—	—	—	—	—	—
1990–91	Milwaukee Admirals	IHL	22	8	12	1	1199	82	0	4.10	—	—	—	—	—	—	—	—	—
1991–92	Milwaukee Admirals	IHL	51	27	18	4	3024	171	1	3.39	—	3	1	2	179	15	0	5.03	—
1992–93	Hamilton Canucks	AHL	44	20	19	3	2601	159	0	3.67	—	—	—	—	—	—	—	—	—
1993–94	Milwaukee Admirals	IHL	40	21	9	8	2206	132	0	3.59	—	3	0	1	141	9	0	3.83	—
1994–95	Fort Wayne Komets	IHL	1	0	1	0	60	5	0	5.00	.839	—	—	—	—	—	—	—	—
1994–95	Milwaukee Admirals	IHL	13	7	4	1	745	50	0	4.03	.875	—	—	—	—	—	—	—	—
NHL totals			145	55	65	16	7975	500	1	3.76	.879	5	2	3	367	12	1	1.96	.931

=== International ===
Year	Team	Event	GP	W	L	T	MIN	GA	SO	GAA
1984	United States	Oly	3	1	0	1	160	10	0	3.75
Senior totals			3	1	0	1	160	10	0	3.75

== Awards and honors ==
Award	Year
All-WCHA First Team	1982–83
WCHA Player of the Year	1982–83

Awards and achievements
Preceded by Phil Sykes	WCHA Most Valuable Player; 1982–83	Succeeded by Tom Kurvers
