= Screen (ice hockey) =

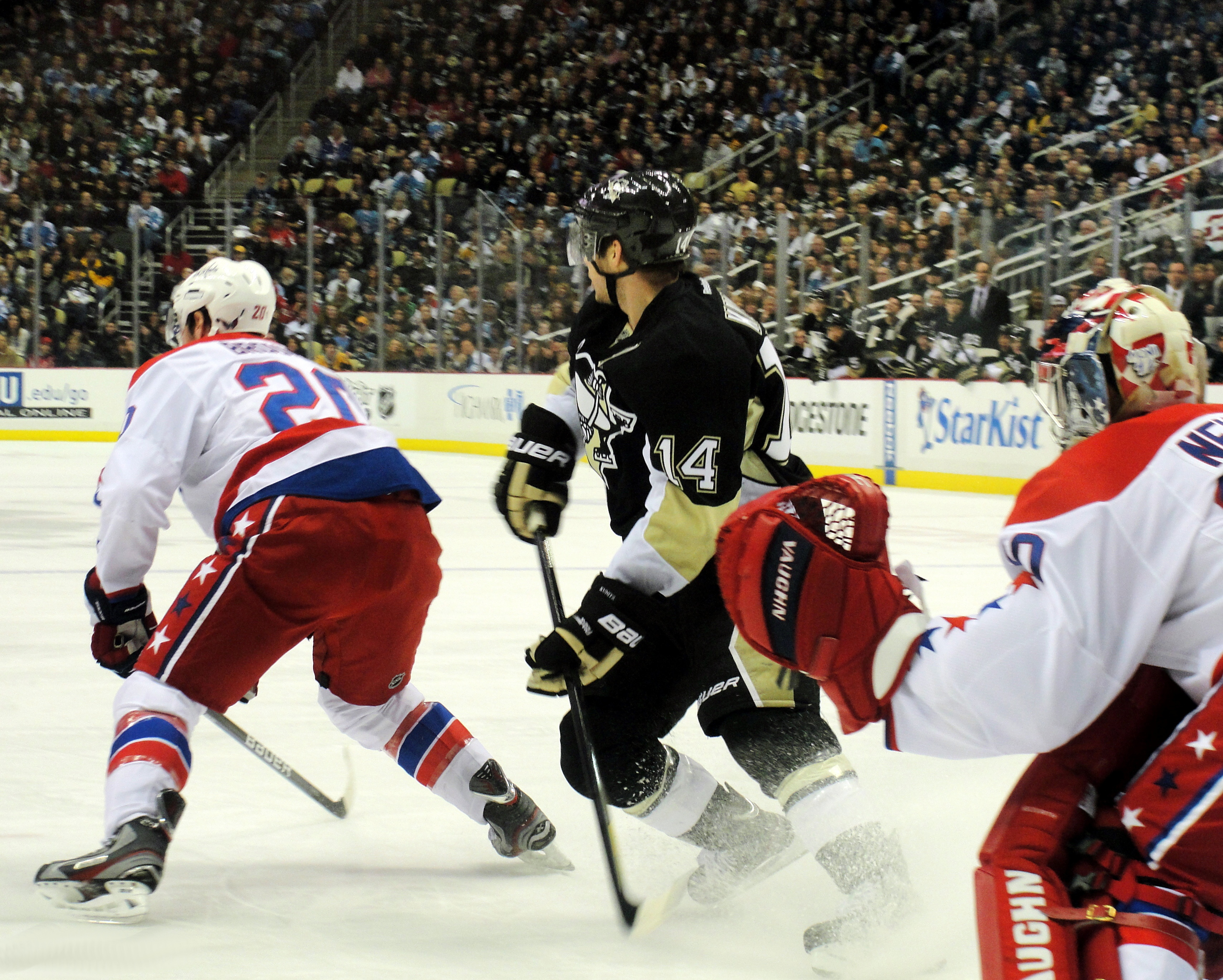
Chris Kunitz of the Pittsburgh Penguins screens Washington Capitals goaltender Michal Neuvirth.

In ice hockey, a screen is obstruction by a player of the goaltender's view of the puck. The word can also be used as a verb, commonly "don't screen the goaltender", or "the goalie was screened". Screens can be both planned, as when an attacking forward positions himself in front of the net, or accidental, like when a defensemen accidentally blocks the goaltender's view. Attacking players may attempt to take advantage of a screen by taking a shot, which is more difficult for the opposing goaltender to save if they are being screened.
