= Pat LaFontaine =

American ice hockey player (born 1965)

- Hockey Hall of Fame, 2003
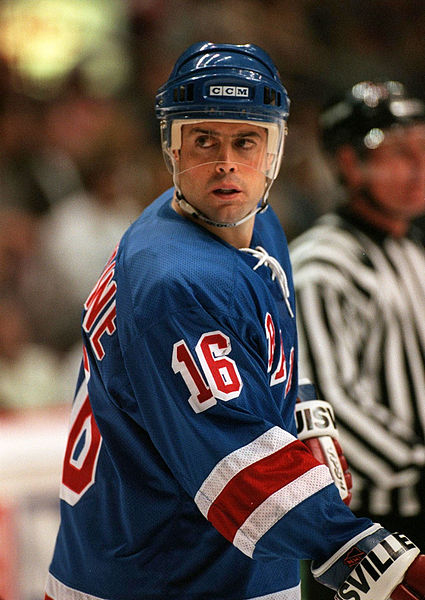
- LaFontaine with the New York Rangers in 1997
- Born: February 22, 1965 (age 61) St. Louis, Missouri, U.S.
- Height: 5 ft 10 in (178 cm)
- Weight: 180 lb (82 kg; 12 st 12 lb)
- Position: Center
- Shot: Right
- Played for: New York Islanders; Buffalo Sabres; New York Rangers
- National team: United States
- NHL draft: 3rd overall, 1983; New York Islanders
- Playing career: 1983–1998

Patrick Michael LaFontaine (born February 22, 1965) is an American former professional ice hockey player. He played as a center in the National Hockey League (NHL) and spent his entire playing career with the league's New York State-based teams. He was inducted into the Hockey Hall of Fame in 2003.

LaFontaine played for the New York Islanders from 1983 until 1991, the Buffalo Sabres from 1991 until 1997, and the New York Rangers from 1997 until his retirement in 1998, scoring 468 goals and 1,013 points along the way before his career was ended by concussions. His 1.17 points per game (1,013 points over 865 games) is the best among American-born ice hockey players, active or retired. In 2017, LaFontaine was named one of the "100 Greatest NHL Players" in history. LaFontaine served as an executive of the Buffalo Sabres as the president of hockey operations from November 2013 to March 2014.

== Playing career ==
=== Junior ===
Although he was born in St. Louis, LaFontaine grew up in Waterford, Michigan. His father moved the family to the Detroit area in 1972. As a youth, LaFontaine played in the 1977 Quebec International Pee-Wee Hockey Tournament with a minor ice hockey team from Waterford. He graduated from Waterford Kettering High School. LaFontaine began his junior career with the Verdun Juniors of the Quebec Major Junior Hockey League (QMJHL) during the 1982–83 season. In his only season in the QMJHL, LaFontaine contributed 104 goals and 130 assists for Verdun. LaFontaine's 234 points was tops in the league and he was awarded the Jean Béliveau Trophy as the top scorer, out-dueling future NHL icon Mario Lemieux. His rookie season broke many records, including Guy Lafleur's 40-game point-scoring streak and Mike Bossy's 70 goals by a rookie. Other awards LaFontaine received after the season were the Michel Brière Memorial Trophy as the MVP of the regular season, the Guy Lafleur Trophy as the MVP of the playoffs, the Michel Bergeron Trophy as the Offensive Rookie of the Year, the Mike Bossy Trophy as the best professional prospect, and the Frank J. Selke Memorial Trophy as the most sportsmanlike player. Lafontaine was also chosen as the CHL Player of the Year.

=== NHL ===
On October 1, 1981, the New York Islanders traded Bob Lorimer and Dave Cameron to the Colorado Rockies for the Rockies' (later market rival New Jersey Devils') first-round draft pick in 1983; LaFontaine was selected by the Islanders in the first round as the third pick overall in the 1983 NHL entry draft with that pick. After representing the United States in the 1984 Winter Olympics in Sarajevo, Yugoslavia, LaFontaine joined the Islanders in time for the 1984 Stanley Cup Final. His arrival was concurrent with the beginning of the end of the Islanders' dynasty, as the team was steeped deep in aging veterans. The Islanders lost in the Stanley Cup Final that year to the Edmonton Oilers, ending the team's run of consecutive Stanley Cup championships at four. LaFontaine had a strong performance, scoring two third-period goals during the Islanders' 5–2 loss to the Oilers in the fifth and deciding game of the series.

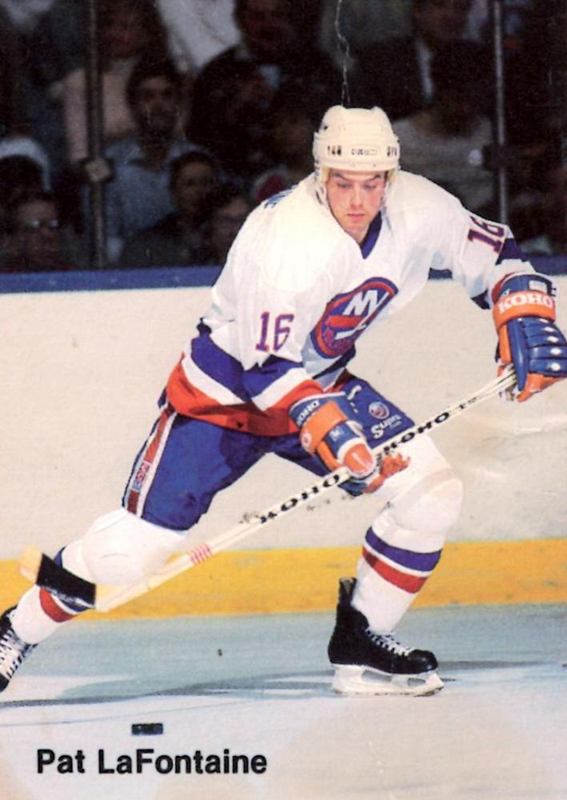
LaFontaine with the New York Islanders in 1987

In the 1987 Stanley Cup playoffs, LaFontaine scored the winning goal in the fourth overtime period of the seventh and decisive game between the Islanders and Washington Capitals, known as the "Easter Epic". The game was started on Saturday, April 18, and concluded just before 2 a.m. on the 19th, Easter Sunday. "It was the most memorable moment in my hockey life," he later recalled. "Even today, wherever I go, people come up to me and start telling me where they were during the Easter Epic."

The Islanders continued to struggle and in 1988–89, they missed the playoffs for the first time since 1974. In the first game of the Islanders' next playoff series, in 1990, LaFontaine suffered the first of many concussions, after a controversial, open-ice hit by James Patrick of the New York Rangers. He fell on his head and was unconscious while being taken off the ice on a stretcher. The ambulance he took was delayed en route to the hospital by Ranger fans who rocked and pounded it as it left Madison Square Garden. He was lost for the remainder of the series.

The 1990–91 season was a successful season for LaFontaine, but not the Islanders, who finished with a record of 25–45–10. LaFontaine, frustrated with his situation on Long Island, turned down a four-year, $6 million contract offer and refused to report to the Islanders for the start of the 1991–92 NHL season. Three weeks into the season, on October 25, 1991, LaFontaine was traded, along with Randy Wood, to the Buffalo Sabres for four players, including former first overall pick Pierre Turgeon. In only 57 games in 1991–92, LaFontaine scored 46 goals and 93 points.

The following season, LaFontaine recorded a personal-best and team-record 148 points (53 goals and 95 assists). The 148 points are also the most points scored by an American-born player in one season. His play-making ability helped his linemate Alexander Mogilny set a team season record with 76 goals (as of 2020, both LaFontaine's 95 assists, 148 points and Mogilny's 76 goals still stand as the Sabres' team records for a single season). LaFontaine finished as runner-up to Mario Lemieux in the scoring race and earned a spot on the postseason NHL All-Star second team. He was also a finalist for the Hart Memorial Trophy as NHL MVP and the Lady Byng Trophy as the most sportsmanlike player. In 1994–95 he was awarded the Bill Masterton Trophy as the player who best exemplified the qualities of perseverance, sportsmanship, and dedication to ice hockey.

LaFontaine is one of six players in NHL history to skate for all three teams based in the state of New York. The others were Mike Donnelly, Jason Dawe, Martin Biron, Chad Johnson, and Taylor Pyatt. Unique amongst them, LaFontaine played his entire career in the state of New York, while the others all played for additional teams outside the state in their careers. LaFontaine once joked about it, saying "I think I'm the only player in history who has been traded twice and hasn't had to change his license plate."

=== Retirement ===
The 1996–97 season was the beginning of the end of his career. In a game against the Pittsburgh Penguins, LaFontaine was hammered by François Leroux with a high hit to the head, knocking him out with a concussion, and resulted in post-concussion syndrome. He was determined to return, even though the doctors advised against such an attempt. Sabres management, in conjunction with team doctors and specialists, refused to clear LaFontaine to return, and recommended he retire. LaFontaine, still believing he could play, was traded to the New York Rangers in a cost-cutting measure for a second round draft choice in the 1998 NHL entry draft and future considerations on September 29, 1997. During his one season with the Rangers, he tied for the team lead in goals scored, and recorded his 1,000th career NHL point.

In a game against the Ottawa Senators on March 16, 1998, LaFontaine accidentally collided with teammate Mike Keane and suffered another concussion. LaFontaine missed the remainder of the season and all of the next season, announcing his retirement formally on October 12, 1999.

Announced in 2001, the Pat LaFontaine Trophy was awarded to the winner of the Islanders–Rangers regular season series, with money paid by the losing team to the charity of LaFontaine's choice. It is unclear whether the trophy is still awarded or acknowledged by either team.

He was inducted into the Hockey Hall of Fame on November 3, 2003. "I am truly thrilled to receive this tremendous honor," said LaFontaine upon receiving the news. "Growing up in St. Louis, I always played for the love of the game and never dreamed this could ever lead to my being a member of the Hockey Hall of Fame." He was inducted into the United States Hockey Hall of Fame in that same year.

On March 3, 2006, the Buffalo Sabres retired LaFontaine's number 16. He was also inducted into the Buffalo Sabres Hall of Fame in 2004. LaFontaine was voted the third-greatest Buffalo Sabre in the team's 40-year history.

On December 13, 2025, LaFontaine was inducted into the Islanders' Hall of Fame.

== Post-playing career ==
On June 7, 2006, the Islanders announced that Pat LaFontaine would return to the Islanders as Senior Advisor to the Owner. This was short-lived, however, as LaFontaine resigned in protest only six weeks later on July 18, the same day that Neil Smith was fired by the Islanders.

In March 2006, Pat LaFontaine's no. 16 jersey was retired by the Buffalo Sabres and raised to the rafters of HSBC Arena (now KeyBank Center), joining other Sabres legends Gilbert Perreault, Rick Martin, and René Robert (collectively known as The French Connection), Tim Horton and Danny Gare.

During the 2010 Stanley Cup playoffs, LaFontaine appeared in an NHL cross-promotional commercial for Honda, featuring Neal Broten, Mike Richter constructing a pond hockey rink and playing a pick-up game with neighborhood children.

As of 2010, LaFontaine works as a commentator for MSG Network Rangers broadcasts.

On November 13, 2013, LaFontaine was announced to be the new president of hockey operations for the Buffalo Sabres. On March 1, 2014, Pat LaFontaine resigned his position as president of hockey operations with the club on Saturday after just over three months on the job to resume his previous role with the National Hockey League.

== International play ==
Medal record

Men's ice hockey

Representing the United States

World Cup of Hockey
Gold medal – first place	1996 Canada	

Canada Cup
Silver medal – second place	1991 Canada	

LaFontaine was selected to play for the United States national team in the 1984 Winter Olympics. LaFontaine scored five goals and three assists as the U.S. finished in seventh place. He also played in the 1998 Winter Olympics, where he scored one goal and one assist as the U.S. finished sixth.

In the 1989 Ice Hockey World Championships, LaFontaine scored five goals and three assists as the U.S. finished in sixth place.

LaFontaine played in the Canada Cup tournament twice, first in 1987 and then 1991, where he helped the U.S. reach the final but lost to Canada.

In the 1996 World Cup of Hockey, LaFontaine scored two goals and two assists as the U.S. beat Canada 5–2 in the final, earning him his first international championship win.

== Personal life ==
In 1997, LaFontaine founded the Companions in Courage Foundation, an organization that builds interactive game rooms in children's hospitals throughout North America.

In 2000, the Congressional Medal of Honor Society bestowed the Patriot Award on LaFontaine in recognition of his contribution to military morale throughout his career. In 2002, LaFontaine was given an honorary Goal! Award, sponsored by the Points of Light Foundation, for having overcome depression, living in the community and performing volunteer work. In 1998 he was honored with the Public Leadership in Neurology Award for his work in Public Awareness of Concussion In Sports.

In April 2003, LaFontaine was recognized with the International Humanitarian Award by the Gift of Life Foundation, an organization promoting the cure and treatment of children suffering from heart disease in third world countries.

In March 2004, LaFontaine was inducted into the Michigan Sports Hall of Fame at a ceremony in Detroit. In March 2005, he was named recipient of the James Keller Award by The Christophers organization. Since 1987, the Award has recognized individuals who have contributed in a meaningful way to the well-being of young people.

In 2007, LaFontaine was inducted into the Nassau County Sports Hall of Fame.

In November 2008, Pat participated in his sixth career Ironman Triathlon event in Panama City, Florida. He swam 2.4 miles, rode a bike 112 miles and then ran a 26-mile marathon as a fundraiser for his charity.

== Career statistics ==
=== Regular season and playoffs ===
			Regular season					Playoffs
Season	Team	League	GP	G	A	Pts	PIM	GP	G	A	Pts	PIM
1981–82	Detroit Compuware	MNHL	79	175	149	324	—	—	—	—	—	—
1982–83	Verdun Juniors	QMJHL	70	104	130	234	10	15	11	24	35	4
1982–83	Verdun Juniors	M-Cup	—	—	—	—	—	4	3	2	5	2
1983–84	United States	Intl	58	56	55	111	22	—	—	—	—	—
1983–84	New York Islanders	NHL	15	13	6	19	6	16	3	6	9	8
1984–85	New York Islanders	NHL	67	19	35	54	32	9	1	2	3	4
1985–86	New York Islanders	NHL	65	30	23	53	43	3	1	0	1	0
1986–87	New York Islanders	NHL	80	38	32	70	70	14	5	7	12	10
1987–88	New York Islanders	NHL	75	47	45	92	52	6	4	5	9	8
1988–89	New York Islanders	NHL	79	45	43	88	26	—	—	—	—	—
1989–90	New York Islanders	NHL	74	54	51	105	38	2	0	1	1	0
1990–91	New York Islanders	NHL	75	41	44	85	42	—	—	—	—	—
1991–92	Buffalo Sabres	NHL	57	46	47	93	98	7	8	3	11	4
1992–93	Buffalo Sabres	NHL	84	53	95	148	63	7	2	10	12	0
1993–94	Buffalo Sabres	NHL	16	5	13	18	2	—	—	—	—	—
1994–95	Buffalo Sabres	NHL	22	12	15	27	4	5	2	2	4	2
1995–96	Buffalo Sabres	NHL	76	40	51	91	36	—	—	—	—	—
1996–97	Buffalo Sabres	NHL	13	2	6	8	4	—	—	—	—	—
1997–98	New York Rangers	NHL	67	23	39	62	36	—	—	—	—	—
NHL totals			865	468	545	1,013	552	69	26	36	62	36

=== International ===
Year	Team	Event	GP	G	A	Pts	PIM
1984	United States	OLY	6	5	3	8	0
1987	United States	CC	5	3	0	3	0
1989	United States	WC	10	5	3	8	8
1991	United States	CC	6	3	1	4	2
1996	United States	WCH	5	2	2	4	2
1998	United States	OLY	4	1	1	2	0
Senior totals			36	19	10	29	12

== Awards and honors ==
CHL:

- CHL Player of the Year: 1983
- CHL Top Scorer Award: 1983 (234)

QMJHL:

- President's Cup champion: 1983
- Guy Lafleur Trophy: 1983
- Jean Béliveau Trophy: 1983
- Frank J. Selke Memorial Trophy: 1983
- Michael Bossy Trophy: 1983
- Michel Brière Memorial Trophy: 1983
- Michel Bergeron Trophy: 1983
- QMJHL first All-Star team: 1983

NHL:

- Selected to five NHL All-Star Games: 1988, 1989, 1990, 1991, 1993
- Bill Masterton Memorial Trophy: 1995
- Second All-Star team: 1993
- Lester Patrick Trophy: 1997 (with Bill Cleary and Seymour H. Knox III)

== See also ==
- List of members of the Hockey Hall of Fame
- List of members of the United States Hockey Hall of Fame
- List of NHL players with 1,000 points
- Easter Epic

Preceded by Dave Simpson	CHL Player of the Year; 1983	Succeeded by Mario Lemieux
Preceded by Patrick Flatley	New York Islanders first-round draft pick 1983	Succeeded by Gerald Diduck
Preceded by Mike Ramsey	Buffalo Sabres captain 1992–1997; Alexander Mogilny, 1993–94	Succeeded by Michael Peca
Preceded by Cam Neely	Bill Masterton Trophy winner 1995	Succeeded by Gary Roberts
