= 1983–84 Bowling Green Falcons men's ice hockey season =

National champion KeyBank Tournament, champion CCHA, champion NCAA tournament, champion
- Conference: 1st CCHA
- Home ice: BGSU Ice Arena

Record
- Overall: 34–8–2
- Conference: 22–4–2
- Home: 18–2–0
- Road: 11–4–1
- Neutral: 5–2–1

Coaches and captains
- Head coach: Jerry York
- Captain(s): Mike Pikul; Wayne Wilson

The 1983–84 Bowling Green Falcons men's ice hockey team represented the Bowling Green University in college ice hockey. In its 5th year under head coach Jerry York the team compiled a 34–8–2 record and reached the NCAA tournament for the fifth time. The Falcons defeated Minnesota–Duluth 5–4 in the fourth overtime to win the championship game at the 1980 Olympic Arena in Lake Placid, New York, the longest title game in NCAA history.

== Season ==
=== Early season success ===
Bowling Green was champing at the bit after being left out of the 1983 Tournament despite winning the CCHA and having a better record than the team picked ahead of them, Minnesota–Duluth. The Falcons got off to a good start with a sweep of visiting Clarkson but when they opened their conference schedule the following week they could only manage a split with Lake Superior State. Losing to an inferior team appeared to galvanize the team and the Falcons proceeded to win the next 17 contests, the longest streak in program history. Through two months Bowling Green scored no fewer than 4 goals in each of their games and though they started out with Wayne Collins in net (their only goaltender with NCAA experience) Gary Kruzich soon became the go-to goalie. Even when Bowling Green was limited to 2 goals the defense showed up and allowed the Falcons to win the KeyBank Tournament. The streak finally ended with a 5–6 overtime loss at Michigan and a week later the team ended up with a tie against Ferris State.

=== Defensive cracks ===
The Falcons regained their footing when they played at home for the first time in over a month against Northern Michigan and after earning 3 points against Illinois–Chicago in early February Bowling Green guaranteed themselves their third consecutive CCHA title. With little to play for Bowling Green played a bad game against Western Michigan, allowing a season-high 8 goals against before earning a split. The following weekend they welcomed in Division III Michigan–Dearborn and dominated the obviously outmatched Wolverines but the lack of a challenge did not help BG right the ship and the squad split their final weekend against cellar-dwelling Miami.

=== CCHA tournament ===
With the program record for wins in sight (37) the team appeared to get back to normal when they opened the tournament with a home win against Lake Superior State but they were back in the losing column after game 2. Fortunately the first round was a total-goal series and the close loss in the second game didn't cost BGSU too much. In the semifinal at the Joe Louis Arena Bowling Green faced Western Michigan and the Broncos showed no fear in facing down the Falcons and the two teams fought to a 3–3 tie through regulation. Kruzich kept the Falcons in the game but future NHLer Glenn Healy couldn't be beaten and in the second overtime WMU scored to end Bowling Green's chance at the conference championship. The Falcons had a chance to redeem themselves in the consolation game but against fell in overtime, this time to Ohio State.

=== NCAA tournament ===
Even with losing three consecutive games Bowling Green still had the second best record in the country and the selection committee gave them an at-large bid, slotting them third in the west. As a lower seed, BGSU started the tournament on the road against Boston University and the Falcons still could not break out of their losing skid, dropping the game 3–6. With the team needing to win the second game by 4 goals to advance they had their work cut out for them but Gary Kruzich played one of his best games, holding BU to a single goal while the Falcons scored 4 goals in regulation, and added the series winner in overtime.

Bowling Green returned to Lake Placid to face Michigan State, which had 33 wins. Bowling Green won 2–1, following a defensive performance that limited Michigan State's scoring.

==== Overtime Epic ====
In the championship game BGSU only had Minnesota–Duluth left standing in their way but the #1 ranked Bulldogs looked to be a tough test. Bristling with talent and possessing Hobey Baker Award winner Tom Kurvers, UMD looked to get the jump on Bowling Green early but it was Garry Galley who notched the game's first goal with a shot that somehow found its way through a mass of bodies. Duluth responded with their own goal 20 seconds later and two teams remained tied for the next period plus. Bill Watson broke the tie past the mid-way point of the game while Bob Lakso extended the lead at the start of the third period. With the team down by 2 goals with 19 minutes to play, Bowling Green began firing shot after shot against Rick Kosti and eventually the Falcons' leading goal-scorer Jamie Wansborough broke through with a power play marker. With over 15 minutes to play the Falcons had plenty of time to tie the score but with Duluth playing in a defensive shell their opportunities were limited. The situation became dire when UMD regained their 2-goal advantage with 8 minutes to play but the Falcons responded immediately and cut the lead back to 1. Bowling Green had a good opportunity to tie the game late on a power play but they couldn't convert and as the clock kept ticking it appeared that Minnesota–Duluth was going to win the national title. With less than two minutes to play, team co-captain Wayne Wilson fired the puck into the Duluth zone from the red line. When Kosti went behind the net to play the puck it hit something along the boards and bounced out into the crease and, with three Bulldogs around him, John Samanski poked the puck into the net to tie the game.

With the Duluth faithful screaming that the play should have been icing the two teams restarted play and fought furiously in the final 90 seconds before heading into overtime. In the first overtime UMD nearly ended the game but Kruzich stopped a semi-breakaway by Lakso and neither squad could find the back of the net. The game became the first title game to need more than one extra frame but it did not stop there. Kruzich and Kosti kept the score tied until deep into the fourth 10-minute overtime. With both teams exhausted leading BG scorer Dan Kane found Gino Cavallini alone in front of the net and the sophomore backhanded the puck past Kosti's leg to end the longest championship game in NCAA history (as of 2019).

=== Awards and honors ===
Gary Kruzich became the third consecutive goaltender to win the tournament MOP as much for his overtime heroics as for holding BU and MSU to single goals in the previous two wins. However, Kruzich had to share his All-Tournament team spot with UMD's Rick Kosti, the only time in history that any position was split between two people (as of 2019). Kruzich was joined on the All-Tournament team by David Ellett and Garry Galley while Galley and Dan Kane made the AHCA All-American West Team and the All-CCHA First Team Ellett and John Samanski were named to the CCHA Second Team while none of the individual conference awards went to the Falcons.

The championship was the first for any CCHA team and demonstrated that the conference could compete with the other major powers of the college hockey world.

== Standings ==
1983–84 Central Collegiate Hockey Association standings
	Conference							Overall					
	GP	W	L	T	PTS	GF	GA	GP	W	L	T	GF	GA
Bowling Green†	28	22	4	2	.821	146	95	44	34	8	2	228	146
Ohio State	30	21	9	0	.700	155	96	41	30	10	1	212	133
Michigan State*	30	21	9	0	.700	162	90	46	34	12	0	241	129
Northern Michigan	30	16	14	0	.533	126	118	40	17	22	1	155	161
Western Michigan	28	13	14	1	.482	125	114	42	22	18	2	187	168
Michigan Tech	30	14	16	0	.467	123	128	41	19	21	1	160	167
Ferris State	30	13	15	2	.467	128	138	41	18	20	3	184	184
Lake Superior State	30	12	17	1	.417	103	127	40	18	20	2	152	176
Michigan	30	11	18	1	.383	105	148	37	14	22	1	134	179
Miami	30	10	20	0	.333	116	156	37	13	23	1	149	188
Illinois-Chicago	28	5	22	1	.196	83	162	35	5	29	1	106	221
Championship: Michigan State † indicates conference regular season champion * indicates conference tournament champion

== Schedule ==
Date	Opponent^{#}	Rank^{#}	Site	Result	Record
Regular season
October 14	vs. Clarkson*		BGSU Ice Arena • Bowling Green, Ohio	W 5–2	1–0
October 15	vs. Clarkson*		BGSU Ice Arena • Bowling Green, Ohio	W 5–3	2–0
October 21	vs. Lake Superior State		BGSU Ice Arena • Bowling Green, Ohio	W 7–2	3–0 (1–0)
October 22	vs. Lake Superior State		BGSU Ice Arena • Bowling Green, Ohio	L 1–2	3–1 (1–1)
October 28	vs. Michigan Tech		BGSU Ice Arena • Bowling Green, Ohio	W 6–5	4–1 (2–1)
October 29	vs. Michigan Tech		BGSU Ice Arena • Bowling Green, Ohio	W 5–1	5–1 (3–1)
November 4	at Michigan State		Munn Ice Arena • East Lansing, Michigan	W 7–4	6–1 (4–1)
November 5	at Michigan State		Munn Ice Arena • East Lansing, Michigan	W 5–3	7–1 (5–1)
November 11	vs. Illinois–Chicago		BGSU Ice Arena • Bowling Green, Ohio	W 8–3	8–1 (6–1)
November 12	vs. Illinois–Chicago		BGSU Ice Arena • Bowling Green, Ohio	W 7–2	9–1 (7–1)
November 18	at New Hampshire*		Snively Arena • Durham, New Hampshire	W 6–5 ^{OT}	10–1 (7–1)
November 19	at New Hampshire*		Snively Arena • Durham, New Hampshire	W 4–3	11–1 (7–1)
November 25	vs. Miami		BGSU Ice Arena • Bowling Green, Ohio	W 5–3	12–1 (8–1)
November 26	vs. Miami		BGSU Ice Arena • Bowling Green, Ohio	W 6–3	13–1 (9–1)
December 2	at Ohio State		OSU Ice Rink • Columbus, Ohio	W 4–2	14–1 (10–1)
December 3	vs. Ohio State		BGSU Ice Arena • Bowling Green, Ohio	W 8–6	15–1 (11–1)
December 9	vs. Western Michigan		BGSU Ice Arena • Bowling Green, Ohio	W 5–4	16–1 (12–1)
December 10	vs. Western Michigan		BGSU Ice Arena • Bowling Green, Ohio	W 4–3	17–1 (13–1)
KeyBank Tournament
December 29	vs. Cornell*		1980 Olympic Arena • Lake Placid, New York (Tournament Semifinal)	W 6–4	18–1 (13–1)
December 30	vs. Clarkson*		1980 Olympic Arena • Lake Placid, New York (Tournament championship)	W 2–0	19–1 (13–1)
January 6	at Michigan		Yost Ice Arena • Ann Arbor, Michigan	W 8–2	20–1 (14–1)
January 7	at Michigan		Yost Ice Arena • Ann Arbor, Michigan	L 5–6 ^{OT}	20–2 (14–2)
January 13	at Ferris State		Ewigleben Arena • Big Rapids, Michigan	W 5–2	21–2 (15–2)
January 14	at Ferris State		Ewigleben Arena • Big Rapids, Michigan	T 5–5 ^{OT}	21–2–1 (15–2–1)
January 20	vs. Northern Michigan		BGSU Ice Arena • Bowling Green, Ohio	W 4–2	22–2–1 (16–2–1)
January 21	vs. Northern Michigan		BGSU Ice Arena • Bowling Green, Ohio	W 4–2	23–2–1 (17–2–1)
January 27	vs. Ohio State		BGSU Ice Arena • Bowling Green, Ohio	W 4–3 ^{OT}	24–2–1 (18–2–1)
January 28	at Ohio State		OSU Ice Rink • Columbus, Ohio	W 3–2 ^{OT}	25–2–1 (19–2–1)
February 3	vs. Illinois–Chicago		Franklin Park Ice Arena • Franklin Park, Illinois	W 5–3	26–2–1 (20–2–1)
February 4	vs. Illinois–Chicago		Franklin Park Ice Arena • Franklin Park, Illinois	T 5–5 ^{OT}	26–2–2 (20–2–2)
February 10	at Western Michigan		Lawson Arena • Kalamazoo, Michigan	L 3–8	26–3–2 (20–3–2)
February 11	at Western Michigan		Lawson Arena • Kalamazoo, Michigan	W 4–2	27–3–2 (21–3–2)
February 17	vs. Michigan–Dearborn*		BGSU Ice Arena • Bowling Green, Ohio	W 10–3	28–3–2 (21–3–2)
February 18	vs. Michigan–Dearborn*		BGSU Ice Arena • Bowling Green, Ohio	W 10–2	29–3–2 (21–3–2)
February 24	at Miami		Goggin Ice Arena • Oxford, Ohio	W 11–4	30–3–2 (22–3–2)
February 25	at Miami		Goggin Ice Arena • Oxford, Ohio	L 2–6	30–4–2 (22–4–2)
CCHA tournament
March 2	vs. Lake Superior State*		BGSU Ice Arena • Bowling Green, Ohio (CCHA Quarterfinal game 1)	W 7–3	31–4–2 (22–4–2)
March 3	vs. Lake Superior State*		BGSU Ice Arena • Bowling Green, Ohio (CCHA Quarterfinal game 2)	L 6–7	31–5–2 (22–4–2)
Bowling Green Wins Series 13–10
March 9	vs. Western Michigan*		Joe Louis Arena • Detroit, Michigan (CCHA Semifinal)	L 3–4 ^{2OT}	31–6–2 (22–4–2)
March 10	vs. Ohio State*		Joe Louis Arena • Detroit, Michigan (CCHA Consolation Game)	L 2–3 ^{OT}	31–7–2 (22–4–2)
NCAA tournament
March 16	at Boston University*		Walter Brown Arena • Boston, Massachusetts (National Quarterfinal game 1)	L 3–6	31–8–2 (22–4–2)
March 17	at Boston University*		Walter Brown Arena • Boston, Massachusetts (National Quarterfinal game 2)	W 5–1 ^{OT}	32–8–2 (22–4–2)
Bowling Green Wins Series 8–7
March 23	vs. Michigan State*		1980 Olympic Arena • Lake Placid, New York (National Semifinal)	W 2–1	33–8–2 (22–4–2)
March 24	vs. Minnesota–Duluth*		1980 Olympic Arena • Lake Placid, New York (National championship)	W 5–4 ^{4OT}	34–8–2 (22–4–2)
*Non-conference game. ^{#}Rankings from USCHO.com Poll. Source:

== Roster and scoring statistics ==
No.	Name	Year	Position	Hometown	S/P/C	Games	Goals	Assists	Pts	PIM
7	Dan Kane	Junior	C	Peterborough, ON	(Ontario)	43	24	48	72	61
3	Garry Galley	Junior	D	Montreal, PQ	(Quebec)	44	15	52	67	61
22	John Samanski	Senior	C	Oshawa, ON	(Ontario)	42	25	35	60	52
4	David Ellett	Sophomore	D	Cleveland, OH	(Ohio)	43	15	39	54	96
19	Jamie Wansbrough	Sophomore	RW	Toronto, ON	(Ontario)	40	34	16	50	18
23	Gino Cavallini	Sophomore	LW	Toronto, ON	(Ontario)	43	25	23	48	16
12	Dave O'Brian	Senior	D/W	Kitchener, ON	(Ontario)	44	12	27	39	62
15	George Roll	Junior	W	Blue Island, IL	(Illinois)	44	13	25	38	32
5	Mike Pikul	Senior	D	Rexdale, ON	(Ontario)	41	7	30	37	36
27	Dave Randerson	Junior	RW	Stratford, ON	(Ontario)	43	12	19	31	6
16	Perry Braun	Senior	RW	Surrey, BC	(British Columbia)	38	12	18	30	26
2	Wayne Wilson	Senior	D	Guelph, ON	(Ontario)	44	2	24	26	60
11	Tim Hack	Senior	C	Grenfell, SK	(Saskatchewan)	44	7	16	23	28
24	Iain Duncan	Freshman	LW	Toronto, ON	(Ontario)	44	9	11	20	65
21	Peter Wilson	Senior	RW	Oshawa, ON	(Ontario)	43	6	12	18	40
20	Nick Bandescu	Senior	F	Port Huron, MI	(Michigan)	44	9	8	17	12
8	Todd Flichel	Freshman	D	Osgoode, ON	(Ontario)	44	1	3	4	12
10	Rob Urban	Freshman	F	Minnetonka, MN	(Minnesota)	14	0	3	3	4
29	Eddie Powers	Freshman	G	Bowling Green, OH	(Ohio)	7	0	1	1	0
30	Randy Johnson	Freshman	G	Des Plaines, IL	(Illinois)	2	0	0	0	0
18	John Fish	Sophomore	D	Parry Sound, ON	(Ontario)	4	0	0	0	0
1	Wayne Collins	Sophomore	G	Burlington, MA	(Massachusetts)	12	0	0	0	0
6	Mike Natyshak	Freshman	F	Belle River, ON	(Ontario)	19	0	0	0	0
35	Gary Kruzich	Freshman	G	Oak Lawn, IL	(Illinois)	28	0	0	0	14
Total										

== Goaltending statistics ==
No.	Name	Games	Minutes	Wins	Losses	Ties	Goals against	Saves	Shut outs	SV %	GAA
35	Gary Kruzich	28	–	21	5	2	–	–	–	.896	2.87
30	Randy Johnson	2	15	0	0	0	2	8	0	.800	7.89
1	Wayne Collins	12	–	–	–	–	–	–	–	–	–
29	Eddie Powers	7	–	–	–	–	–	–	–	–	–
Total		44	–	34	8	2	146	–	1	–	–

== 1984 championship game ==
=== (W2) Minnesota–Duluth vs. (W3) Bowling Green ===
March 24	Minnesota–Duluth	4–5	4OT	Bowling Green	1980 Olympic Arena	Recap

Scoring summary
Period	Team	Goal	Assist(s)	Time	Score
1st	BG	Garry Galley	Braun and O'Brien	5:58	1–0 BG
1st	UMD	Mark Baron	Lakso	6:18	1–1
2nd	UMD	Bill Watson – PP	Kurvers and Lakso	33:35	2–1 UMD
3rd	UMD	Bob Lakso	Christensen and Watson	40:47	3–1 UMD
3rd	BG	Jamie Wansbrough – PP	Galley and Ellett	44:41	3–2 UMD
3rd	UMD	Tom Herzig	Baron and Johnson	51:51	4–2 UMD
3rd	BG	Peter Wilson	Pikul and Kane	52:42	4–3 UMD
3rd	BG	John Samanski	W. Wilson and Roll	58:23	4–4
4th Overtime	BG	Gino Cavallini – GW	Kane	97:11	5–4 BG

Shots by period
Team	1	2	3	OT1	OT2	OT3	OT4	T
Bowling Green			13					55
Minnesota–Duluth			4					32

Goaltenders
Team	Name	Saves	Goals against	Time on ice
BG	Gary Kruzich	28	4	
UMD	Rick Kosti	50	5	

== Players drafted into the NHL ==
=== 1984 NHL entry draft ===
= NHL All-Star team	= NHL All-Star	= NHL All-Star and NHL All-Star team	= Did not play in the NHL

Round	Pick	Player	NHL team
4	74	Paul Ysebaert†	New Jersey Devils
5	92	Scott Paluch†	St. Louis Blues
10	193	Brent Regan†	Hartford Whalers
10	204	Daryn Fersovich†	Philadelphia Flyers

† incoming freshman

== See also ==
- 1984 NCAA Division I Men's Ice Hockey Tournament
- List of NCAA Division I Men's Ice Hockey Tournament champions
