= 1984 NCAA Division I men's ice hockey tournament =

- Teams: 8
- Finals site: Olympic Center Ice Rink, Lake Placid, New York
- Champions: Bowling Green Falcons (1st title)
- Runner-up: Minnesota-Duluth Bulldogs (1st title game)
- Semifinalists: North Dakota Fighting Sioux (10th Frozen Four); Michigan State Spartans (4th Frozen Four)
- Winning coach: Jerry York (1st title)
- MOP: Gary Kruzich (Bowling Green)

The 1984 NCAA Division I men's ice hockey tournament was the culmination of the 1983–84 NCAA Division I men's ice hockey season, the 37th such tournament in NCAA history. It was held between March 16 and 24, 1984, and concluded with Bowling Green defeating Minnesota-Duluth 5-4 in quadruple overtime. All Quarterfinals matchups were held at home team venues, while all succeeding games were played at the Olympic Center Ice Rink in Lake Placid, New York.

As of 2025, the final game is the longest match to determine a champion in NCAA history.

== Qualifying teams ==
The NCAA permitted 8 teams to qualify for the tournament and divided its qualifiers into two regions (East and West). Each of the tournament champions from the three Division I conferences (CCHA, ECAC and WCHA) received automatic invitations into the tournament with At-large bids making up the remaining 5 teams, an additional 2 western and 3 eastern schools.

East							West						
Seed	School	Conference	Record	Berth type	Appearance	Last bid	Seed	School	Conference	Record	Berth type	Appearance	Last bid
1	Rensselaer	ECAC Hockey	30–6–0	Tournament champion	5th	1964	1	Michigan State	CCHA	32–10–0	Tournament champion	6th	1983
2	Boston University	ECAC Hockey	27–10–0	At-large bid	14th	1978	2	Minnesota–Duluth	WCHA	27–10–2	Tournament champion	2nd	1983
3	Clarkson	ECAC Hockey	20–10–2	At-large bid	9th	1982	3	Bowling Green	CCHA	31–7–2	At-large bid	5th	1982
4	Boston College	ECAC Hockey	26–11–0	At-large bid	12th	1978	4	North Dakota	WCHA	28–11–2	At-large bid	10th	1982

== Format ==
The tournament featured three rounds of play. The two odd-number ranked teams from one region were placed into a bracket with the two even-number ranked teams of the other region. The teams were then seeded according to their ranking. In the Quarterfinals the first and fourth seeds and the second and third seeds played two-game aggregate series to determine which school advanced to the Semifinals. Beginning with the Semifinals all games were played at the 1980 Olympic Arena and all series became Single-game eliminations. The winning teams in the semifinals advanced to the National Championship Game with the losers playing in a Third Place game.

== Tournament bracket ==
Quarterfinals; March 16–18
E1	Rensselaer	4	2	6
W4	North Dakota	5	4	9
W2	Minnesota–Duluth	6	3	9
E3	Clarkson	2	6	8
W1	Michigan State	6	7	13
E4	Boston College	2	6	8
E2	Boston University	6	1	7
W3	Bowling Green	3	5*	8

Semifinals; March 22–23
W4	North Dakota	1
W2	Minnesota–Duluth	2*
W1	Michigan State	1
W3	Bowling Green	2

National championship March 24
W2	Minnesota–Duluth	4
W3	Bowling Green	5****
Third-place game
W1	Michigan State	5
W4	North Dakota	6*

Note: * denotes overtime period(s)

=== Quarterfinals ===
==== (E1) Rensselaer vs. (W4) North Dakota ====
March 16	Rensselaer	4 – 5	North Dakota	Houston Field House	Recap
(Oates, Magnuson) Terry Butryn - PP - 06:38 (Oates) John Carter - 13:45		First period	07:02 - Brian Williams (Barsness); 08:45 - PP - Dean Barsness (Berezan); 11:39 - Perry Berezan (Brennan, Archibald)
(Hernberg, Dallman) Randy Koudys - 08:40		Second period	No scoring
(Koudys, Iturralde) Marty Dallman - 02:48		Third period	08:36 - Steve Palmiscno (Jensen, Zombo); 09:03 - GW - Jim Archibald (Berezan, Brennan)
(22 saves / 27 shots) Darren Puppa		Goalie stats	Jon Casey (49 saves / 53 shots)

March 17	Rensselaer	2 – 4	North Dakota	Houston Field House	Recap
No scoring		First period	09:41 - PP - Chris Jensen (Brennan, Sherven)
(Koudys) Marty Dallman - 12:58		Second period	16:03 - Rick Zombo (Palmiscno, Williams)
(Koudys, Hernberg) Marty Dallman - PP - 14:27		Third period	00:36 - GW - Gord Sherven (Jensen); 19:00 - EN - Chris Jensen (Barsness, Whitsitt)
(21 saves / 24 shots) Darren Puppa		Goalie stats	Jon Casey (38 saves / 40 shots)

North Dakota won series 9–6

==== (E2) Boston University vs. (W3) Bowling Green ====
March 16	Boston University	6 – 3	Bowling Green	Walter Brown Arena	Recap
No scoring		First period	06:52 - Gino Cavallini (Kane, Pikul)
(Matchett, Cullen) Ed Lowney - 05:12 (Octeau) Chuck Sullivan - 07:32 (Gerlitz) Kevin Mutch - 09:27 (Shaunessy, Cullen) Ed Lowney - GW - 19:13		Second period	18:05 - PP - Garry Galley (Kane, Ellett); 18:17 - Gino Cavallini (Galley)
(Dunbar, Connolly) Mark Pierog - PP - 04:56 (Carlacci, Pierog) Tony Majkozak - 16:23		Third period	No scoring
(31 saves / 34 shots) Cleon Daskalakis		Goalie stats	Wayne Collins (33 saves / 39 shots)

March 17	Boston University	1 – 5	OT	Bowling Green	Walter Brown Arena	Recap
No scoring		First period		04:55 - Garry Galley (Hack, O'Brian); 05:44 - GW - Dave Ellett (Galley, Hack)
(Cullen) Ed Lowney - 12:25		Second period		02:13 - Tim Hack (Braun, O'Brian); 10:59 - Jamie Wansbrough (Galley, Cavallini)
No scoring		Third period		No scoring
No scoring		First overtime period		05:39 - Mike Pikul (Ellett)
(42 saves / 47 shots) Cleon Daskalakis		Goalie stats		Gary Kruzich (27 saves / 28 shots)

Bowling Green won series 8–7

==== (W1) Michigan State vs. (E4) Boston College ====
March 17	Michigan State	6 – 2	Boston College	Munn Ice Arena
(Krentz, Simpson) Dan McFall – 16:09		First period	00:39 – Bob Sweeney (unassisted); 09:45 – Tim Mitchell (unassisted)
(Simpson, Anastos) Dale Krentz – 02:27 (Eisley, Simpson) Lyle Phair – GW – 13:57		Second period	No scoring
(Flegel, Simpson) Jeff Eisley – 09:16 (Flegel, Smyl) Mike Donnelly – 11:01 (Krentz, Anastos) Craig Simpson – 16:30		Third period	No scoring
(22 saves / 24 shots) Norm Foster		Goalie stats	Scott Gordon (21 saves / 27 shots)

March 18	Michigan State	7 – 6	Boston College	Munn Ice Arena
(McSween) Dale Krentz – 11:38 (Taylor) Mike Donnelly – 12:52		First period	02:03 – Dominic Campedelli (Rauseo, Chisholm)
(Shibicky, Taylor) Newell Brown – 01:34 (Miller, McFall) Harvey Smyl – 06:37 (Phair, Brown) Bill Shibicky – 08:01		Second period	06:25 – Bob Sweeney (Rauseo, Harlow); 13:17 – Scott Harlow (Sweeney, Rauseo); 18:37 – Jim Herlihy (Chisholm, McDonough)
(Taylor, Phair) Mitch Messier – 05:26 (Brown) Kelly Miller – GW – 08:00		Third period	14:19 – Billy McDonough (Herlihy, Griffin); 18:37 – Jim Herlihy (Chisholm, McDonough)
(33 saves / 39 shots) Bob Essensa		Goalie stats	Scott Gordon (32 saves / 39 shots)

Michigan State won series 13–8

==== (W2) Minnesota–Duluth vs. (E3) Clarkson ====
March 16	Minnesota–Duluth	6 – 2	Clarkson	DECC Arena	Recap
No scoring		First period	No scoring
(Christensen, Maciver) Bill Watson - 00:19 (Odnokon) Skeeter Moore - 02:11 (Baron, Lakso) Tom Kurvers - GW - 09:35 (Kurvers, Lakso) Bill Watson - PP - 18:01		Second period	No scoring
(Lakso, Maciver) Matt Christensen - PP - 07:18 (Baron, Sprenger) Brad Johnson - 15:13		Third period	14:29 - Gordon Sharpe (Ray, Korchinski); 17:19 - Bob Lenney (Armstrong, Meitner)
(24 saves / 26 shots) Rick Kosti		Goalie stats	Jamie Falle (28 saves / 34 shots)

March 17	Minnesota–Duluth	3 – 6	Clarkson	DECC Arena	Recap
(Watson) Norm Maciver - PP - 09:45		First period	01:56 - Ted Cline (Meitner, Korchinski)
(Maciver) Skeeter Moore - PP - 03:29		Second period	18:24 - Charlie Meitner (Camp, Laing)
(Kurvers) Brad Johnson - 14:37		Third period	03:33 - Derek Ray (Fretz, O'Meara); 05:25 - PP GW - Dave Fretz (Haramis, Meitner); 16:57 - Ted Cline (Meitner, Laing); 18:59 - EA - Bob Armstrong (Cline, O'Meara)
(31 saves / 37 shots) Rick Kosti		Goalie stats	Jamie Falle (30 saves / 33 shots)

Minnesota–Duluth won series 9–8

=== Semifinal ===
==== (W2) Minnesota–Duluth vs. (W4) North Dakota ====
March 22	Minnesota–Duluth	2 – 1	OT	North Dakota	1980 Olympic Arena	Recap
(unassisted) Mark Odnokon - 01:53		First period		No scoring
No scoring		Second period		05:45 - PP - Gord Sherven (Zombo)
No scoring		Third period		No scoring
(Lakso) Bill Watson - GW - 03:08		First overtime period		No scoring
(28 saves / 29 shots) Rick Kosti		Goalie stats		Jon Casey (41 saves / 43 shots)

==== (W1) Michigan State vs. (W3) Bowling Green ====
March 23	Michigan State	1 – 2	Bowling Green	1980 Olympic Arena
No scoring		First period	13:25 – Jamie Wansbrough (Kane, Cavallini)
(Phair) Bill Shibicky – 13:20		Second period	No scoring
No scoring		Third period	07:13 – GW – John Samanski (Randerson, Pikul)
(24 saves / 26 shots) Norm Foster		Goalie stats	Gary Kruzich (25 saves / 26 shots)

=== Third-place game ===
==== (W1) Michigan State vs. (W4) North Dakota ====
March 24	Michigan State	5 – 6	OT	North Dakota	1980 Olympic Arena
(Phair, Shibicky) Newell Brown – 12:38		First period		06:53 – Dean Barsness (unassisted); 11:37 – Brian Williams (Zombo)
(Simpson, Flegel) Jeff Eisley – 08:25		Second period		04:36 – Chris Jensen (Whitsitt); 11:37 – Gord Sherven (Zombo, Jensen)
(Brown, Shibicky) Lyle Phair – 05:23 (Eisley, Simpson) Lyle Phair – 06:54 (Phair, Eisley) Mike Donnelly – 19:31		Third period		16:02 – Dean Barsness (Williams, Palmiscno)
No scoring		First overtime period		05:57 – GW – Dean Barsness (Sandelin)
(38 saves / 44 shots) Norm Foster		Goalie stats		Greg Strome (31 saves / 36 shots)

=== National Championship ===
==== (W2) Minnesota–Duluth vs. (W3) Bowling Green ====
March 24	Minnesota–Duluth	4 – 5	4OT	Bowling Green	1980 Olympic Arena	Recap

Scoring summary
Period	Team	Goal	Assist(s)	Time	Score
1st	BG	Garry Galley	Braun and O'Brien	5:58	1–0 BG
1st	UMD	Mark Baron	Lakso	6:18	1–1
2nd	UMD	Bill Watson – PP	Kurvers and Lakso	33:35	2–1 UMD
3rd	UMD	Bob Lakso	Christensen and Watson	40:47	3–1 UMD
3rd	BG	Jamie Wansbrough – PP	Galley and Ellett	44:41	3–2 UMD
3rd	UMD	Tom Herzig	Baron and Johnson	51:51	4–2 UMD
3rd	BG	Peter Wilson	Pikul and Kane	52:42	4–3 UMD
3rd	BG	John Samanski	W. Wilson and Roll	58:23	4–4
4th Overtime	BG	Gino Cavallini – GW	Kane	97:11	5–4 BG
Penalty summary
Period	Team	Player	Penalty	Time	PIM
1st	BG	Dan Kane	Hooking	5:58	2:00
1st	BG	Iain Duncan	Tripping	12:19	2:00
1st	UMD	Tom Kurvers	Hooking	12:51	2:00
2nd	BG	Wayne Wilson	Tripping	29:46	2:00
2nd	BG	Todd Flichel	Tripping	33:30	2:00
2nd	UMD	Norm Maciver	Slashing	36:45	2:00
3rd	UMD	Mark Baron	Hooking	43:30	2:00
3rd	UMD	Tom Kurvers	Tripping	55:00	2:00
1st Overtime	BG	Mike Pikul	Tripping	63:54	2:00
1st Overtime	UMD	Bill Watson	Hooking	64:02	2:00
2nd Overtime	UMD	Bench	Too many men (served by Sean Toomey)	72:09	2:00
3rd Overtime	BG	Dan Kane	Cross-checking	88:49	2:00
4th Overtime	UMD	Bill Grillo	Hooking	91:15	2:00

Shots by period
Team	1	2	3	OT	2OT	3OT	4OT	T
Bowling Green	13	10	16	10	4	3	4	60
Minnesota–Duluth	8	7	6	2	5	6	2	36

Goaltenders
Team	Name	Saves	Goals against	Time on ice
BG	Gary Kruzich	32	4	
UMD	Rick Kosti	55	5	

== All-Tournament team ==
- G: Rick Kosti (Minnesota-Duluth)
- G: Gary Kruzich* (Bowling Green)
- D: David Ellett (Bowling Green)
- D: Garry Galley (Bowling Green)
- F: Dean Barsness (North Dakota)
- F: Bob Lakso (Minnesota-Duluth)
- F: Lyle Phair (Michigan State)

* Most Outstanding Player(s)
