= T. J. Connolly =

T. J. Connolly may refer to:

- T. J. Connolly (hurler)
- T. J. Connolly (ice hockey)
