= List of CCHA All-Tournament Teams =

The CCHA All-Tournament Team was an honor bestowed at the conclusion of the NCAA Division I Central Collegiate Hockey Association conference tournament to the players judged to have performed the best during the championship. The team was composed of three forwards, two defensemen and one goaltender with additional players named in the event of a tie. Voting for the honor was conducted by the head coaches of each member team once the tournament has completed and any player regardless of their team's finish is eligible.

The All-Tournament Team began being awarded after the first championship in 1972 and continued for four seasons before being discontinued after 1975. In 1983, a year after 4 teams broke away from the WCHA and joined the CCHA, the all-tournament team returned and remained until the dissolution of the conference in 2013.

== All-Tournament Teams ==
=== 1970s ===
1972
Player	Pos	Team
Bill McKenzie	G	Ohio State
Roger Archer	D	Bowling Green
Jim Witherspoon	D	Ohio State
Mike Bartley	F	Bowling Green
John Nestic	F	St. Louis
Jerry Welsh	F	Ohio State

1973
Player	Pos	Team
Ralph Kloiber	G	St. Louis
Roger Archer	D	Bowling Green
Jan Kascak	D	St. Louis
Rick Kennedy	F	St. Louis
John Stewart	F	Bowling Green
Bruce Woodhouse	F	Bowling Green

1974
Player	Pos	Team
Carl Sapinsky	G	St. Louis
Tom Davies	D	Lake Superior State
Mario Faubert	D	St. Louis
Charlie Labelle	F	St. Louis
Rich Nagai	F	Bowling Green
John Nestic	F	St. Louis

1975
Player	Pos	Team
Lindsay Middlebrook	G	St. Louis
Roger Archer	D	Bowling Green
Kevin O'Rear	D	St. Louis
Tim Dunlop	F	Western Michigan
Julio Francella	F	Lake Superior State
Doug Lawton	F	St. Louis

=== 1980s ===
1983
Player	Pos	Team
Mike David	G	Bowling Green
Mike Pikul	D	Bowling Green
Garry Galley	D	Bowling Green
Dan Kane	F	Bowling Green
Gord Flegel	F	Michigan State
Kelly Miller	F	Michigan State

1984
Player	Pos	Team
Norm Foster	G	Michigan State
David Ellett	D	Bowling Green
Jeff Eisley	D	Michigan State
Newell Brown	F	Michigan State
Gord Flegel	F	Michigan State
Dan Dorion	F	Western Michigan

1985
Player	Pos	Team
Norm Foster	G	Michigan State
Dan McFall	D	Michigan State
Donald McSween	D	Michigan State
Tom Anastos	F	Michigan State
Kelly Miller	F	Michigan State
Craig Simpson	F	Michigan State

1986
Player	Pos	Team
Bill Horn	G	Western Michigan
Wayne Gagné	D	Western Michigan
Chris MacDonald	D	Western Michigan
Dan Dorion	F	Western Michigan
Jamie Wansbrough	F	Bowling Green
Stuart Burnie	F	Western Michigan

1987
Player	Pos	Team
Gary Kruzich	G	Bowling Green
Scott Paluch	D	Bowling Green
Donald McSween	D	Michigan State
Paul Ysebaert	F	Bowling Green
Jeff Madill	F	Ohio State
Bobby Reynolds	F	Michigan State

1988
Player	Pos	Team
Paul Connell	G	Bowling Green
Karl Johnston	D	Lake Superior State
Scott Paluch	D	Bowling Green
Bobby Reynolds	F	Michigan State
Brett Barnett	F	Lake Superior State
Don Barber	F	Bowling Green

1989
Player	Pos	Team
Jason Muzzatti	G	Michigan State
Brad Hamilton	D	Michigan State
Dan Keczmer	D	Lake Superior State
Bobby Reynolds	F	Michigan State
Sheldon Gorski	F	Illinois-Chicago
Anthony Palumbo	F	Lake Superior State

=== 1990s ===
1990
Player	Pos	Team
Jason Muzzatti	G	Michigan State
Rob Blake	D	Bowling Green
Kord Cernich	D	Lake Superior State
Peter White	F	Michigan State
Jeff Jablonski	F	Lake Superior State
Mark Ouimet	F	Michigan

1991
Player	Pos	Team
Darrin Madeley	G	Lake Superior State
Karl Johnston	D	Lake Superior State
Aaron Ward	D	Michigan
Don Stone	F	Michigan
Doug Weight	F	Lake Superior State
Mike Eastwood	F	Western Michigan

1992
Player	Pos	Team
Darrin Madeley	G	Lake Superior State
Tim Hanley	D	Lake Superior State
Pat Neaton	D	Michigan
Brian Rolston	F	Lake Superior State
Brian Wiseman	F	Michigan
Dwayne Norris	F	Michigan State

1993
Player	Pos	Team
Blaine Lacher	G	Lake Superior State
Michael Smith	D	Lake Superior State
Bob Marshall	D	Miami
Rob Valicevic	F	Lake Superior State
Wayne Strachan	F	Lake Superior State
Brian Rolston	F	Lake Superior State

1994
Player	Pos	Team
Blaine Lacher	G	Lake Superior State
Steven Halko	D	Michigan
Blake Sloan	D	Michigan
Steve Guolla	F	Michigan State
Brian Wiseman	F	Michigan
Mike Stone	F	Michigan

1995
Player	Pos	Team
Mike Buzak	G	Michigan State
Keith Aldridge	D	Lake Superior State
Chris Slater	D	Michigan State
Wayne Strachan	F	Lake Superior State
Bates Battaglia	F	Lake Superior State
Jason Trzcinski	F	Lake Superior State

1996
Player	Pos	Team
John Grahame	G	Lake Superior State
Harold Schock	D	Michigan
Keith Aldridge	D	Lake Superior State
John Madden	F	Michigan
Gerald Tallaire	F	Lake Superior State
Bobby Hayes	F	Michigan

1997
Player	Pos	Team
Chad Alban	G	Michigan State
Chris Bogas	D	Michigan State
Mike Weaver	D	Michigan State
Brendan Morrison	F	Michigan
Jason Botterill	F	Michigan
Mike Watt	F	Michigan State

1998
Player	Pos	Team
Jeff Maund	G	Ohio State
Ryan Root	D	Ohio State
Tyler Harlton	D	Michigan State
Todd Compeau	F	Ohio State
Chris Richards	F	Ohio State
Mike York	F	Michigan State

1999
Player	Pos	Team
Josh Blackburn	G	Michigan
Mike Van Ryn	D	Michigan
Sean Connolly	D	Northern Michigan
J.P. Vigier	F	Northern Michigan
Sean Ritchlin	F	Michigan
Mark Kosick	F	Michigan

=== 2000s ===
2000
Player	Pos	Team
Ryan Miller	G	Michigan State
Greg Zanon	D	Nebraska-Omaha
Andrew Hutchinson	D	Michigan State
Shawn Horcoff	F	Michigan State
Jeff Hoggan	F	Nebraska-Omaha
Rustyn Dolyny	F	Michigan State

2001
Player	Pos	Team
Ryan Miller	G	Michigan State
Dave Huntzkicker	D	Michigan
Andrew Hutchinson	D	Michigan State
Joe Kautz	F	Michigan
Sean Patchell	F	Michigan State
Adam Hall	F	Michigan State

2002
Player	Pos	Team
Josh Blackburn	G	Michigan
Mike Komisarek	D	Michigan
Brad Fast	D	Michigan State
Jed Ortmeyer	F	Michigan
Chris Gobert	F	Northern Michigan
Michael Cammalleri	F	Michigan

2003
Player	Pos	Team
Al Montoya	G	Michigan
Brandon Rogers	D	Michigan
Simon Mangos	D	Ferris State
Dwight Helminen	F	Michigan
Chris Kunitz	F	Ferris State
Jed Ortmeyer	F	Michigan

2004
Player	Pos	Team
Dave Caruso	G	Ohio State
Doug Andress	D	Ohio State
Andy Greene	D	Miami
Paul Caponigri	F	Ohio State
Rod Pelley	F	Ohio State
Brandon Kaleniecki	F	Michigan

2005
Player	Pos	Team
Wylie Rogers	G	Alaska-Fairbanks
Brandon Rogers	D	Michigan
Sean Collins	D	Ohio State
Jeff Tambellini	F	Michigan
Tom Fritsche	F	Ohio State
Ryan McLeod	F	Alaska-Fairbanks

2006
Player	Pos	Team
Jeff Lerg	G	Michigan State
Andy Greene	D	Miami
Matt Hunwick	D	Michigan
Tim Crowder	F	Michigan State
Ryan Jones	F	Miami
Drew Miller	F	Michigan State

2007
Player	Pos	Team
David Brown	G	Notre Dame
Jack Johnson	D	Michigan
Wes O'Neill	D	Notre Dame
Erik Condra	F	Notre Dame
T. J. Hensick	F	Michigan
Kevin Porter	F	Michigan

2008
Player	Pos	Team
Jeff Zatkoff	G	Miami
Alec Martinez	D	Miami
Mark Mitera	D	Michigan
Ryan Jones	F	Miami
Tim Miller	F	Michigan
Matt Siddall	F	Northern Michigan

2009
Player	Pos	Team
Jordan Pearce	G	Notre Dame
Ian Cole	D	Notre Dame
Steven Kampfer	D	Michigan
Louie Caporusso	F	Michigan
Calle Ridderwall	F	Notre Dame
Ben Ryan	F	Notre Dame

=== 2010s ===
2010
Player	Pos	Team
Shawn Hunwick	G	Michigan
Steven Kampfer	D	Michigan
Eric Gustaffson	D	Northern Michigan
Ray Kaunisto	F	Northern Michigan
Louie Caporusso	F	Michigan
Carl Hagelin	F	Michigan

2011
Player	Pos	Team
Cody Reichard	G	Miami
Will Weber	D	Miami
Danny DeKeyser	D	Western Michigan
Andy Miele	F	Miami
Reilly Smith	F	Miami
Dane Walters	F	Western Michigan

2012
Player	Pos	Team
Frank Slubowski	G	Western Michigan
Lee Moffie	D	Michigan
Danny DeKeyser	D	Western Michigan
Luke Moffatt	F	Michigan
Greg Squires	F	Western Michigan
Reilly Smith	F	Miami

2013
Player	Pos	Team
Steven Racine	G	Michigan
Stephen Johns	D	Notre Dame
Jacob Trouba	D	Michigan
Austin Wuthrich	F	Notre Dame
Andrew Copp	F	Michigan
T. J. Tynan	F	Notre Dame

=== All-Tournament Team players by school ===
==== Current CCHA Teams ====
School	Winners
Lake Superior State	27
Bowling Green	20
Northern Michigan	6
Ferris State	2

==== Former CCHA Teams ====
School	Winners
Michigan	48
Michigan State	42
Ohio State	14
Western Michigan	13
Miami	12
St. Louis	11
Notre Dame	10
Alaska-Fairbanks	2
Nebraska-Omaha	2
Illinois-Chicago	1

=== Multiple appearances ===
Player	All-Tournament Team appearances
Roger Archer	3
Bobby Reynolds	3
many players tied with	2

== See also ==
- CCHA Awards
- Most Valuable Player in Tournament
