= Bob Lakso =

American ice hockey player (born 1962)

- Born: April 3, 1962 (age 64) Aurora, Minnesota, USA
- Height: 5 ft 11 in (180 cm)
- Weight: 181 lb (82 kg; 12 st 13 lb)
- Position: Left Wing
- Shot: Left
- Played for: Minnesota Duluth; Springfield Indians; Indianapolis Checkers; Milwaukee Admirals; Indianapolis Ice; Fort Wayne Komets
- NHL draft: 184th, 1980; Minnesota North Stars
- Playing career: 1980–1993

Robert Lakso is an American retired ice hockey left wing who was an All-American for Minnesota Duluth.

== Career ==
Lakso was a star player for Aurora-Hoyt Lakes, playing football, cross country and track in addition to hockey. The NHL had changed its draft rules that year, making Lakso eligible for the 1980 NHL entry draft, and he was selected in the 9th round by his home state Minnesota North Stars.

The following fall, Lasko began attending the University of Minnesota Duluth and he began his collegiate career slowly. A broken leg delayed the start to his sophomore season but, once he got back on the ice, Lakso began playing much better. The program changed coaches in 1982, and Mike Sertich's arrival changed the trajectory of the program. In his junior season Lakso was nearly a point-per-game player for a team that set a new program record with 28 wins. Unfortunately, many of those victories didn't come in conference play and UMD finished 4th in the WCHA. Despite the low finish, the team did receive its first bid to the NCAA Tournament where they were knocked out in the quarterfinals.

Undeterred, Lasko was named alternate captain for his senior season and he produced his best season to date. His point production improved and he helped Minnesota–Duluth win their first WCHA title in 19 years of league play. The Bulldogs clinched the crown in a 4–2 thanks to a hat-trick from Lakso. UMD then won their first ever conference championship and received the second western seed in the 1984 NCAA Tournament. UMD was able to eke out a victory over Clarkson in the quarterfinals to make their first Frozen Four. They faced a North Dakota squad looking for revenge but the two team's defenses held and overtime was required. It didn't take long for Lakso to find Bill Watson with a pass and the later ended the game early in the first extra session.

UMD headed to their first championship game against Bowling Green and Lakso was ready with a tremendous performance. He assisted on the first two Minnesota–Duluth goals and scored the third to give the Bulldogs a 3–1 lead early in the third period. Unfortunately, a late comeback resulted in the two teams ending regulation with a 4–4 tie. The two ended up playing the longest championship game in NCAA history, requiring 4 overtimes, but it was Bowling Green who ended up scoring the winner. Lakso was named to the All-Tournament team, to go along with his All-American honors.

After graduating, Lakso began his professional career with the Springfield Indians but quickly found himself demoted to the IHL. He found a great deal of success playing AA hockey but, despite his scoring exploits, played just 25 games at the AHL level. Despite finishing 3rd on his team in 1987, Minnesota didn't renew Lakso's contract and he went on to play for three IHL teams over the next three years. he found his greatest success with the Fort Wayne Komets, scoring 100 points in his first year with the club. That offseason, the team moved to Albany but Lakso stayed in Fort Wayne when a different franchise was moved in to replace the departed Komets, taking over the same name. Lakso was traded to the new Komets for the promise that Fort Wayne would pay its own travel costs whenever it travelled to Albany. As the Albany team folded part-way through the next season, the trade turned out to be a steal for Fort Wayne.

Injuries hampered the rest of Lakso's career, but he was able to reach the Turner Cup Final in 1991 and then win the championship in 1993. Lakso retired after the title, ending his playing career on a high note.

== Statistics ==
=== Regular season and playoffs ===
			Regular Season					Playoffs
Season	Team	League	GP	G	A	Pts	PIM	GP	G	A	Pts	PIM
1979–80	Aurora-Hoyt Lakes	MN-HS	—	—	—	—	—	—	—	—	—	—
1980–81	Minnesota–Duluth	WCHA	36	7	6	13	2	—	—	—	—	—
1981–82	Minnesota–Duluth	WCHA	28	12	11	23	8	—	—	—	—	—
1982–83	Minnesota–Duluth	WCHA	45	18	25	43	8	—	—	—	—	—
1983–84	Minnesota–Duluth	WCHA	43	32	34	66	12	—	—	—	—	—
1984–85	Springfield Indians	AHL	8	2	1	3	0	—	—	—	—	—
1984–85	Indianapolis Checkers	IHL	76	26	32	58	4	6	3	2	5	2
1985–86	Springfield Indians	AHL	17	3	6	9	2	—	—	—	—	—
1985–86	Indianapolis Checkers	IHL	58	41	35	76	4	5	4	2	6	0
1986–87	Indianapolis Checkers	IHL	79	39	55	94	6	6	2	2	4	0
1987–88	Milwaukee Admirals	IHL	80	43	28	71	10	—	—	—	—	—
1988–89	Indianapolis Ice	IHL	82	38	34	72	10	—	—	—	—	—
1989–90	Fort Wayne Komets	IHL	82	42	58	100	6	5	3	3	6	0
1990–91	Fort Wayne Komets	IHL	66	31	31	62	8	19	6	12	18	2
1991–92	Fort Wayne Komets	IHL	68	31	29	60	10	—	—	—	—	—
1992–93	Fort Wayne Komets	IHL	63	17	21	38	4	1	0	1	1	0
NCAA totals			152	69	76	145	30	—	—	—	—	—
AHL totals			25	5	7	12	2	—	—	—	—	—
IHL totals			654	308	323	631	62	42	18	22	40	4

== Awards and honors ==
Award	Year
All-WCHA Second Team	1983–84
AHCA West Second-Team All-American	1983–84
All-NCAA All-Tournament Team	1984
