= Lyle Phair =

Canadian ice hockey player

- Born: August 31, 1961 (age 63); Pilot Mound, Manitoba, Canada
- Height: 6 ft 1 in (185 cm)
- Weight: 190 lb (86 kg; 13 st 8 lb)
- Position: Left wing
- Shot: Left
- Played for: Los Angeles Kings
- NHL draft: Undrafted
- Playing career: 1985–1989

Lyle Phair (born August 31, 1961) is a Canadian former ice hockey player who played parts of three seasons for the Los Angeles Kings in the National Hockey League from 1985 to 1988.

Phair was born in Pilot Mound, Manitoba.

== Career statistics ==
=== Regular season and playoffs ===
			Regular season					Playoffs
Season	Team	League	GP	G	A	Pts	PIM	GP	G	A	Pts	PIM
1979–80	Selkirk Steelers	MJHL	48	41	50	91	—	—	—	—	—	—
1980–81	Selkirk Steelers	MJHL	48	21	48	69	—	—	—	—	—	—
1981–82	Michigan State University	CCHA	42	19	24	43	49	—	—	—	—	—
1982–83	Michigan State University	CCHA	42	20	15	35	64	—	—	—	—	—
1983–84	Michigan State University	CCHA	45	15	16	31	58	—	—	—	—	—
1984–85	Michigan State University	CCHA	43	23	27	50	86	—	—	—	—	—
1985–86	Los Angeles Kings	NHL	15	0	1	1	2	—	—	—	—	—
1985–86	New Haven Nighthawks	AHL	35	9	9	18	15	2	0	1	1	0
1986–87	Los Angeles Kings	NHL	5	2	0	2	0	—	—	—	—	—
1986–87	New Haven Nighthawks	AHL	65	19	27	46	77	7	0	3	3	13
1987–88	Los Angeles Kings	NHL	28	4	6	10	8	1	0	0	0	0
1987–88	New Haven Nighthawks	AHL	45	15	12	27	26	—	—	—	—	—
1988–89	New Haven Nighthawks	AHL	11	2	3	5	4	—	—	—	—	—
1988–89	Utica Devils	AHL	58	5	19	24	24	3	0	0	0	2
AHL totals			214	50	70	120	146	12	0	4	4	15
NHL totals			48	6	7	13	12	1	0	0	0	0

== Awards and honors ==
Award	Year
All-NCAA All-Tournament Team	1984
