= Kelly Miller (ice hockey, born 1963) =

American ice hockey player (born 1963)

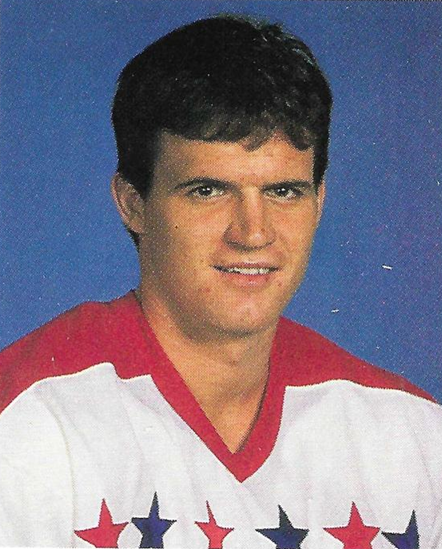
- Born: March 3, 1963 (age 63) Lansing, Michigan, U.S.
- Height: 5 ft 11 in (180 cm)
- Weight: 198 lb (90 kg; 14 st 2 lb)
- Position: Left wing
- Shot: Left
- Played for: New York Rangers; Washington Capitals
- National team: United States
- NHL draft: 183rd overall, 1982; New York Rangers
- Playing career: 1985–2000

Kelly David Miller (born March 3, 1963) is an American former professional ice hockey winger who played in the National Hockey League between 1985 and 1999 with the New York Rangers and Washington Capitals.

== Early life ==
Miller was born in Lansing, Michigan. He is one of ten members of his extended family to play hockey at Michigan State University for the Spartans men's ice hockey team.

== Career ==
Miller began his NHL career with the New York Rangers during the 1984–85 season. He was traded to the Washington Capitals during the 1986–87 season in a trade that sent former first-round pick Bobby Carpenter to the Rangers. From 2001 to 2003 he served as an assistant coach with the New York Islanders.

In April 2011, Miller was named assistant coach of the MSU hockey team, joining former teammate Tom Anastos who was given the head coaching position earlier in the year.

== Personal life ==
Miller's brothers, Kevin and Kip, also played in the (NHL). His cousins are former NHL goaltender Ryan Miller and Ryan's brother Drew Miller.

== Career statistics ==
=== Regular season and playoffs ===
			Regular season					Playoffs
Season	Team	League	GP	G	A	Pts	PIM	GP	G	A	Pts	PIM
1978–79	Detroit Adrays	MNHL	—	—	—	—	—	—	—	—	—	—
1979–80	Redford Royals	GLJHL	45	31	37	68	6	—	—	—	—	—
1980–81	Redford Royals	GLJHL	48	39	51	90	8	—	—	—	—	—
1981–82	Michigan State University	CCHA	40	11	19	30	21	—	—	—	—	—
1982–83	Michigan State University	CCHA	36	16	19	35	12	—	—	—	—	—
1983–84	Michigan State University	CCHA	46	28	21	49	12	—	—	—	—	—
1984–85	Michigan State University	CCHA	43	27	23	50	21	—	—	—	—	—
1984–85	New York Rangers	NHL	5	0	2	2	2	3	0	0	0	2
1985–86	New York Rangers	NHL	74	13	20	33	52	16	3	4	7	4
1986–87	New York Rangers	NHL	38	6	14	20	22	—	—	—	—	—
1986–87	Washington Capitals	NHL	30	10	12	22	26	7	2	2	4	0
1987–88	Washington Capitals	NHL	80	9	23	32	35	14	4	4	8	10
1988–89	Washington Capitals	NHL	78	19	21	40	45	6	1	0	1	2
1989–90	Washington Capitals	NHL	80	18	22	40	49	15	3	5	8	23
1990–91	Washington Capitals	NHL	80	24	26	50	29	11	4	2	6	6
1991–92	Washington Capitals	NHL	78	14	38	52	49	7	1	2	3	4
1992–93	Washington Capitals	NHL	84	18	27	45	32	6	0	3	3	2
1993–94	Washington Capitals	NHL	84	14	25	39	32	11	2	7	9	0
1994–95	Washington Capitals	NHL	48	10	13	23	6	7	0	3	3	4
1995–96	Washington Capitals	NHL	74	7	13	20	30	6	0	1	1	4
1996–97	Washington Capitals	NHL	77	10	14	24	33	—	—	—	—	—
1997–98	Washington Capitals	NHL	76	7	7	14	41	10	0	1	1	4
1998–99	Washington Capitals	NHL	62	2	5	7	29	—	—	—	—	—
1999–00	Grand Rapids Griffins	IHL	26	4	4	8	8	7	0	1	1	2
NHL totals			1,057	181	282	463	512	119	20	34	54	65

=== International ===
Year	Team	Event	GP	G	A	Pts	PIM
1981	United States	WJC	5	0	0	0	0
1982	United States	WJC	7	2	4	6	0
1983	United States	WJC	7	0	1	1	0
1985	United States	WC	10	2	3	5	2
1987	United States	CC	5	0	0	0	0
1989	United States	WC	9	2	4	6	2
1999	United States	WC	6	0	1	1	2
Junior totals			19	2	5	7	0
Senior totals			30	4	8	12	6

== Awards and honors ==
Award	Year
CCHA All-Tournament Team	1983, 1985
All-CCHA First Team	1984–85
AHCA West First-Team All-American	1984–85

== See also ==
- Notable families in the NHL
- List of NHL players with 1,000 games played
