= Chris Jensen =

Canadian ice hockey player (born 1963)

- Born: October 28, 1963 (age 62) Fort St. John, British Columbia, Canada
- Height: 5 ft 11 in (180 cm)
- Weight: 175 lb (79 kg; 12 st 7 lb)
- Position: Centre
- Shot: Right
- Played for: New York Rangers; Philadelphia Flyers
- Coached for: Wheeling Nailers
- NHL draft: 78th overall, 1982; New York Rangers
- Playing career: 1986–1998
- Coaching career: 1997–1999

Christopher B. Jensen (born October 28, 1963) is a Canadian former professional ice hockey centre who played 73 games over six seasons in the National Hockey League (NHL) between 1986 and 1991 for the New York Rangers and Philadelphia Flyers. The rest of his career, which lasted from 1986 to 1998, was spent in the minor leagues. He captained the Portland Pirates to a Calder Cup championship in 1994. In 1997, Jensen was named a player-assistant coach for the ECHL's Wheeling Nailers under head coach Peter Laviolette. He retired following the 1997–98 season, first being named a full-time assistant coach with Wheeling before being elevated to head coach after Laviolette accepted the same position with the AHL's Providence Bruins.

Jensen was born in Fort St. John, British Columbia, and grew up in Salmon Arm, British Columbia.

== Career statistics ==
=== Regular season and playoffs ===
			Regular season					Playoffs
Season	Team	League	GP	G	A	Pts	PIM	GP	G	A	Pts	PIM
1980–81	Kelowna Buckaroos	BCJHL	50	48	43	91	66	3	3	2	5	6
1981–82	Kelowna Buckaroos	BCJHL	41	39	47	86	92	7	7	9	16	120
1982–83	University of North Dakota	WCHA	13	3	3	6	28	—	—	—	—	—
1983–84	University of North Dakota	WCHA	44	24	25	49	100	—	—	—	—	—
1984–85	University of North Dakota	WCHA	40	25	27	52	80	—	—	—	—	—
1985–86	University of North Dakota	WCHA	34	25	40	65	53	—	—	—	—	—
1985–86	New York Rangers	NHL	9	1	3	4	0	—	—	—	—	—
1986–87	New York Rangers	NHL	36	6	7	13	21	—	—	—	—	—
1986–87	New Haven Nighthawks	AHL	14	4	9	13	41	—	—	—	—	—
1987–88	New York Rangers	NHL	7	0	1	1	2	—	—	—	—	—
1987–88	Colorado Rangers	IHL	43	10	23	33	68	10	3	7	10	8
1988–89	Hershey Bears	AHL	45	27	31	58	66	10	4	5	9	29
1989–90	Philadelphia Flyers	NHL	1	0	0	0	2	—	—	—	—	—
1989–90	Hershey Bears	AHL	43	16	26	42	101	—	—	—	—	—
1990–91	Philadelphia Flyers	NHL	18	33	1	3	2	—	—	—	—	—
1990–91	Hershey Bears	AHL	50	26	20	46	83	6	2	2	4	10
1991–92	Philadelphia Flyers	NHL	2	0	0	0	0	—	—	—	—	—
1991–92	Hershey Bears	AHL	71	38	33	71	134	6	0	1	1	2
1992–93	Hershey Bears	AHL	74	33	47	80	95	—	—	—	—	—
1993–94	Portland Pirates	AHL	56	33	28	61	52	16	6	10	16	22
1994–95	Portland Pirates	AHL	67	35	42	77	89	7	4	3	7	0
1995–96	Minnesota Moose	IHL	52	25	19	44	109	—	—	—	—	—
1995–96	Michigan K-Wings	IHL	13	5	5	10	7	6	0	2	2	6
1996–97	Manitoba Moose	IHL	16	6	4	10	23	—	—	—	—	—
1996–97	Long Beach Ice Dogs	IHL	16	3	5	8	10	18	2	2	4	28
1997–98	Wheeling Nailers	ECHL	39	14	14	28	120	15	8	4	12	26
AHL totals			420	212	236	448	661	45	16	21	37	63
NHL totals			73	9	12	21	27	—	—	—	—	—
