= Mike Sertich =

American ice hockey coach (1947–2024)

Biographical details
- Born: January 9, 1947; Virginia, Minnesota, U.S.
- Died: August 8, 2024 (aged 77); Duluth, Minnesota, U.S.

Playing career
- 1966-69: Minnesota-Duluth
- Position: Defenceman

Coaching career (HC unless noted)
- 1982–2000: Minnesota Duluth
- 2000–2003: Michigan Tech
- 2010–2012: St. Scholastica (asst.)

Head coaching record
- Overall: 375–397–53 (.487)
- Tournaments: 6–6 (.500)

Accomplishments and honors

Championships
- 3× WCHA regular season champion (1984, 1985, 1993); 2× WCHA tournament champion (1984, 1985)

Awards
- 1983 WCHA Coach of the Year; 1984 WCHA Coach of the Year; 1985 WCHA Coach of the Year; 1993 WCHA Coach of the Year; 1984 Spencer Penrose Award

Mike Sertich (January 9, 1947 – August 8, 2024) was an American ice hockey coach. He was the head coach of University of Minnesota Duluth Bulldogs men's ice hockey from 1983 through to 2000. He continued coaching for several years after resigning before retiring.

== Career ==
Sertich began his career at Minnesota-Duluth in the mid-1960s, playing three years as a defenseman for the Bulldogs. After his playing days were over he got behind the bench at Grand Rapids High School with Gus Hendrickson, a man he would eventually replace as head coach. In 1975 both Sertich and Hendrickson would join the staff at his alma mater though Hendrickson, as head coach, saw very little success, having only one winning season in seven years. Sertich was chosen to replace Hendrickson for the 1982–1983 season and brought about an immediate change.

In Sertich's first season at the helm, Minnesota-Duluth posted a 28-win season, the most victories the team had accumulated in one year to that point, and amassed the best record since it had joined the WCHA in 1965. Additionally they made their first NCAA Tournament appearance. The next season saw continued improvement when the Bulldogs won the 1984 WCHA men's ice hockey tournament before marching all the way to the 1984 National Championship game but ended up losing to Bowling Green in quadruple overtime. Sertich saw more gains the following year with a second consecutive conference title and an outstanding 36-win season (UMD's only 30-win season to date) (as of 2014). Duluth finished the 1985 NCAA Tournament in third place, losing in the semifinal to eventual champion Rensselaer though this time only in triple overtime. For his exemplary record in his first three years as head coach Sertich was named WCHA coach of the Year each season (no other coach has ever won in consecutive years) and the national coach of the year in 1984.

After those early years, however, the Bulldogs fell back to the rest of the pack. After another successful season in 1985–1986, Minnesota-Duluth would only have two winning seasons over the next nine years, one of which coming in 1992–1993 when Sertich won both his last regular season title and coach of the year award (both from the WCHA). After a brief renaissance in the mid-1990s with three consecutive winning seasons the Bulldogs won only seven games in 1998–1999, their lowest total in 30 years, and while they improved the following season, it wasn't enough to keep Sertich around as he announced, mid-season, that the 2000 campaign would be his last.

Less than a year later Sertich was suddenly back in the college ranks after taking over at Michigan Tech in the middle of the season. Sertich replaced an ineffective Tim Watters after the latter began the year 1-7-1 and sought to fix the fortunes of the once-great Huskies, salvaging the season by going 7-17-3 the rest of the way. Sertich spent two more years in Houghton calling it quits a second time and while the results weren't shown in the standings, there was a definite improvement with the character of the team. Several years later Sertich signed on as an assistant at College of St. Scholastica in Minnesota, but left after only two seasons.

== Death ==
Sertich died in Duluth, Minnesota on August 8, 2024, at the age of 77.

== Head coaching record ==
Record table
Season	Team	Overall	Conference	Standing	Postseason
Minnesota–Duluth Bulldogs (WCHA) (1982–2000)
1982-83	Minnesota-Duluth	28-16-1	14-12-0	4th	NCAA quarterfinals
1983-84	Minnesota-Duluth	29-12-2	19-5-2	1st	NCAA runner-up
1984-85	Minnesota-Duluth	36-9-3	25-7-2	1st	NCAA Third Place
1985-86	Minnesota-Duluth	26-13-3	21-12-1	4th	WCHA semifinals
1986-87	Minnesota-Duluth	11-27-1	11-23-1	8th	WCHA first round
1987-88	Minnesota-Duluth	18-21-2	15-18-2	t-6th	WCHA Third Place (loss)
1988-89	Minnesota-Duluth	15-23-2	12-21-2	7th	WCHA first round
1989-90	Minnesota-Duluth	20-19-1	13-15-0	t-5th	WCHA first round
1990-91	Minnesota-Duluth	14-19-7	11-15-6	t-5th	WCHA first round
1991-92	Minnesota-Duluth	15-20-2	14-16-2	5th	WCHA first round
1992-93	Minnesota-Duluth	27-11-2	21-9-2	1st	NCAA West Regional semifinals
1993-94	Minnesota-Duluth	14-21-3	12-17-3	7th	WCHA first round
1994-95	Minnesota-Duluth	16-18-4	13-15-4	7th	WCHA first round
1995-96	Minnesota-Duluth	20-17-1	16-15-1	t-4th	WCHA first round
1996-97	Minnesota-Duluth	18-16-4	15-13-4	6th	WCHA first round
1997-98	Minnesota-Duluth	21-17-2	14-12-2	5th	WCHA Quarterfinal
1998-99	Minnesota-Duluth	7-27-4	4-20-4	9th	WCHA first round
1999-00	Minnesota-Duluth	15-22-0	10-18-0	8th	WCHA first round
Minnesota-Duluth:		350-328-44	260-263-38		
Michigan Tech Huskies (WCHA) (2000–2003)
2000-01	Michigan Tech	7-17-3†	2-15-3†	10th	WCHA first round
2001-02	Michigan Tech	8-28-2	4-22-2	10th	WCHA first round
2002-03	Michigan Tech	10-24-4	7-18-3	9th	WCHA first round
Michigan Tech:		25-69-9	13-55-8		
Total:		375-397-53			
National champion Postseason invitational champion Conference regular season champion Conference regular season and conference tournament champion Division regular season champion Division regular season and conference tournament champion Conference tournament champion

Mid-Season replacement†

Awards and achievements
Preceded by John Gasparini; Brad Buetow	WCHA Coach of the Year; 1982–83 / 1983–84 / 1984–85; 1992–93	Succeeded by Ralph Backstrom; Don Lucia
Preceded by Bill Cleary	Spencer Penrose Award; 1983–84	Succeeded by Len Ceglarski
Preceded by Rick Comley	Hobey Baker Legends of College Hockey Award; 2021	Succeeded by John Gasparini
