= Gary Kruzich =

American ice hockey player and coach

- Born: April 22, 1965 (age 61) Oak Lawn, Illinois U.S.
- Height: 5 ft 5 in (165 cm)
- Weight: 175 lb (79 kg; 12 st 7 lb)
- Position: Goaltender
- Caught: Left
- Played for: Flint Spirits
- NHL draft: 1986 NHL Supplemental Draft; New York Islanders
- Playing career: 1984–1989

Gary Kruzich (born April 22, 1965) is an American former professional ice hockey player and coach. Kruzich backstopped Bowling Green to their first (and only as of 2018) National Title in 1984, earning Tournament MOP honors and winning the longest championship game in tournament history.

== Career ==
When Kruzich arrived at Bowling Green he joined a team that had won the conference title the previous year but had been passed over for the NCAA tournament when they lost their conference tournament championship in overtime. Over the course of his freshman season Kruzich beat out three other Falcon goaltenders to take over the starting position, ending the season with a record of 21-5-2 and finishing fourth in the nation with a 2.87 g.a.a. Despite his superb play Bowling Green couldn't capitalize on their third consecutive conference title and fell in the conference semifinal to Western Michigan in double overtime. Despite the setback Kruzich's regular season exploits helped the Falcons to a 31-7-2 record which was good enough for the selection committee to place the Falcons as the third western seed.

Bowling Green started the tournament with a thud, losing the opening game to Boston University 6-3. Because the quarterfinal rounds were 2-game total-goal series at the time the Falcons would need to beat the Terriers by four goals if they wanted to advance. Kruzich rebounded in the second game, stopping all but one BU shot and put the Falcons into overtime up 4-1. Kruzich held BU off the scoresheet for more than two extra frames, giving his team the time it needed to notch the deciding goal and put the Falcons into the Frozen Four. The Falcons met three-time defending CCHA tournament champion and #1 western seed Michigan State in the semifinal. Kruzich and the BG defense shut down the nation's top offense and downed the Spartans 2-1 to move on to their first title game.

Minnesota–Duluth, the team that was picked ahead of the Falcons in 1983, was the only obstacle left in their path. The Bulldogs built a 3-1 lead through 2 periods and opened the third with a fourth marker. With no margin left for error Kruzich turned away everything else that came his way and allowed the Falcons to chip away at Duluth's lead. When John Samanski's tying goal sent the game into overtime it was only the fourth time in 37 years that the title game had needed extra time. Kruzich and his counterpart Rick Kosti saw to it that the game would be a classic when they both refused to yield the final goal through three additional 10-minute periods. With 1:47 remaining in the fourth overtime the Falcon's Gino Cavallini finally broke the tie and gave Bowling Green the National Title. Both Kruzich and Kosti were named to the all-tournament team, the first time in history that players of any position split the vote but Kruzich was the sole recipient of the Tournament Most Outstanding Player award.

Kruzich's Falcons declined in 1984–85 but the team regained their fortunes with a conference title and a tournament berth in 1987. This time, however, they were no match for the high-powered Harvard Crimson and lost the opening round series 10-1. In his four years Kruzich earned All-American honors twice and ended with a record of 88-35-4, breaking the wins record (82) that had been set by Ron Grahame in 1973. Kruzich had also been selected by the New York Islanders in the first supplemental draft in 1986 and embarked on a brief professional career. After two years with the Flint Spirits Kruzich retired as a player in 1989.

Many years later Kruzich returned to college hockey as a goaltending coach for Finlandia University. He spent four years with the program and later was hired by Michigan Tech as the Director of Athletic Partnerships & Ticket Sales.

== Awards and honors ==
Award	Year
All-NCAA All-Tournament Team	1984
NCAA Tournament MVP	1984
All-CCHA First Team	1985–86
AHCA West First-Team All-American	1985–86
All-CCHA First Team	1986–87
AHCA West First-Team All-American	1986–87
CCHA All-Tournament Team	1987

Awards and achievements
Preceded by Marc Behrend	NCAA Tournament Most Outstanding Player; 1984	Succeeded by Chris Terreri
