= Dale Krentz =

Canadian ice hockey player

- Born: December 19, 1961 (age 63) Steinbach, Manitoba, Canada
- Height: 5 ft 11 in (180 cm)
- Weight: 190 lb (86 kg; 13 st 8 lb)
- Position: Left wing
- Shot: Left
- Played for: Detroit Red Wings; Mannheimer ERC; SC Bern; Adler Mannheim; Star Bulls Rosenheim
- NHL draft: Undrafted
- Playing career: 1985–1996

Dale M. Krentz (born December 19, 1961) is a Canadian former ice hockey player who played 30 games in the National Hockey League with the Detroit Red Wings between and 1987 and 1989. The rest of his career, which lasted from 1985 to 1996, was spent in the minor leagues and then in Europe. Krentz played at the collegiate level for Michigan State.

== Career statistics ==
=== Regular season and playoffs ===
			Regular season					Playoffs
Season	Team	League	GP	G	A	Pts	PIM	GP	G	A	Pts	PIM
1978–79	Selkirk Steelers	MJHL	—	—	—	—	—	—	—	—	—	—
1979–80	Selkirk Steelers	MJHL	—	—	—	—	—	—	—	—	—	—
1980–81	Selkirk Steelers	MJHL	—	—	—	—	—	—	—	—	—	—
1981–82	Selkirk Steelers	MJHL	48	37	69	106	—	—	—	—	—	—
1982–83	Michigan State University	CCHA	42	11	24	35	50	—	—	—	—	—
1983–84	Michigan State University	CCHA	44	12	20	32	34	—	—	—	—	—
1984–85	Michigan State University	CCHA	44	24	30	54	26	—	—	—	—	—
1985–86	Adirondack Red Wings	AHL	79	19	27	46	27	13	2	6	8	9
1986–87	Detroit Red Wings	NHL	8	0	0	0	0	—	—	—	—	—
1986–87	Adirondack Red Wings	AHL	71	32	39	71	68	11	3	4	7	10
1987–88	Detroit Red Wings	NHL	6	2	0	2	5	2	0	0	0	0
1987–88	Adirondack Red Wings	AHL	67	39	43	82	65	8	11	4	15	8
1988–89	Detroit Red Wings	NHL	16	3	3	6	4	—	—	—	—	—
1988–89	Adirondack Red Wings	AHL	36	21	20	41	30	—	—	—	—	—
1989–90	Adirondack Red Wings	AHL	74	38	50	88	36	6	2	3	5	11
1990–91	Mannheimer ERC	GER	44	28	29	57	24	3	1	0	1	2
1990–91	SC Bern	NLA	—	—	—	—	—	5	6	1	7	4
1991–92	Mannheimer ERC	GER	44	25	30	55	24	7	1	2	3	6
1992–93	Mannheimer ERC	GER	43	20	21	41	48	8	4	1	5	6
1993–94	Mannheimer ERC	GER	44	22	22	44	53	4	2	1	3	0
1994–95	Adler Mannheim	DEL	42	14	25	39	55	10	3	9	12	12
1995–96	Star Bulls Rosenheim	DEL	49	25	28	53	62	4	0	1	1	6
1995–96	HC Thurgau	NLB	—	—	—	—	—	1	0	0	0	0
GER/DEL totals			266	134	155	289	266	36	11	14	25	32
NHL totals			30	5	3	8	9	2	0	0	0	0
