= T. J. Connolly (ice hockey) =

American ice hockey player

- Born: Quincy, Massachusetts, USA
- Height: 5 ft 10 in (178 cm)
- Weight: 181 lb (82 kg; 12 st 13 lb)
- Position: Defenseman
- Played for: Boston University; Salt Lake Golden Eagles
- Playing career: 1980–1985

T. J. Connolly is an American retired ice hockey defenseman who was an All-American for Boston University.

== Career ==
Connolly arrived at Boston University as the team was going through a lull. While the team was good defensively, the Terrier's offense was pretty poor during Connolly's first two seasons and, as a result, BU missed the postseason both years. The program began to climb back to prominence in Connolly's junior year with improvements on both sides of the puck. While Connolly didn't contribute much offensively, he was able to get squad to allow fewer and fewer goals, helping them to climb up to 6th in ECAC Hockey. The team didn't last long in the postseason, but the Terriers were finally back to playing winning hockey.

Entering his senior season, Connolly was named team captain and led the team to one of its best seasons. BU finished tied for second in the conference standings, equaling the record of hated rival Boston College. The team had one of the top defenses in the country thanks to the work of freshman Cleon Daskalakis and Connolly, both of whom were named as All-Americans. In the ECAC Tournament BU knocked out BC in the semifinal and, though they fell in the championship game, it gave them the better matchup in the team first NCAA Tournament appearance in six years. The Terriers won the opening game 6–3, only to see Bowling Green surge back with a 4–1 lead after regulation. Because the quarterfinals were two-game total-goal series, the teams needed overtime to decide the winner. Unfortunately for Connolly, the final goal came from the Falcons and his college career came to an abrupt end.

After graduating, Connolly played one year in the IHL before retiring.

== Career statistics ==
=== Regular season and playoffs ===
			Regular Season					Playoffs
Season	Team	League	GP	G	A	Pts	PIM	GP	G	A	Pts	PIM
1980–81	Boston University	ECAC	26	1	8	9	52	—	—	—	—	—
1981–82	Boston University	ECAC	24	2	13	15	60	—	—	—	—	—
1982–83	Boston University	ECAC	29	4	18	22	24	—	—	—	—	—
1983–84	Boston University	ECAC	40	3	20	23	34	—	—	—	—	—
1984–85	Salt Lake Golden Eagles	IHL	40	2	5	7	41	—	—	—	—	—
NCAA totals			119	10	59	69	170	—	—	—	—	—

== Awards and honors ==
Award	Year
All-ECAC Hockey First Team	1983–84
AHCA East Second-Team All-American	1983–84
