= KeyBank Tournament =

Men's ice hockey tournament

- Sport: College ice hockey
- Founded: 1980
- Folded: 1985
- No. of teams: 4
- Venue: 1980 Olympic Arena
- Most titles: St. Lawrence (2)

The KeyBank Tournament (initially the I Love New York Tournament) was a college Division I men's ice hockey tournament played before New Years at the 1980 Olympic Arena in Lake Placid, New York.

The tournament was first held in November 1980, after which it was moved to late December as a holiday tournament. For the third tournament in 1982 KeyBank became the sponsor and the tournament was renamed accordingly. KeyBank ended their sponsorship after the 6th championship and when no other funding came about the tournament was discontinued.

== Yearly results ==
Year	Champion	Runner-up	Third place	Fourth place
1985	Toronto	Bowling Green	Clarkson	St. Lawrence
1984	Ohio State	Cornell	St. Lawrence	McGill
1983	Bowling Green	Clarkson	Cornell	Brown
1982	St. Lawrence	Boston College	Cornell	Concordia
1981	Clarkson	Cornell	Boston College	Plattsburgh State
1980	St. Lawrence	Concordia	Western Ontario	?

== Team records ==
Team	# of times participated	Titles
St. Lawrence	4	2
Clarkson	3	1
Bowling Green	2	1
Ohio State	1	1
Toronto	1	1
Cornell	4	0
Boston College	2	0
Concordia	2	0
Brown	1	0
McGill	1	0
Plattsburgh State	1	0
Western Ontario	1	0
