= Dan Kane (ice hockey) =

American ice hockey player

- Born: June 12, 1962 (age 64) Clinton, New York, USA
- Height: 5 ft 11 in (180 cm)
- Weight: 175 lb (79 kg; 12 st 7 lb)
- Position: Center
- Shot: Left
- Played for: Bowling Green; Moncton Golden Flames; Milwaukee Admirals
- Playing career: 1981–1985

Daniel Kane is an American retired ice hockey center who was an All-American for Bowling Green and helped the team win its first National Championship in 1984.

== Career ==
Kane arrived in Bowling Green in the fall of 1981, just in time to see the Falcons regain their status as one of the CCHA's top teams. As a freshman he helped BGSU finish atop the conference standings, third in the CCHA Tournament and reach the NCAA Tournament. The team's season was ended when they lost a heart-breaking triple overtime match to New Hampshire in the quarterfinals.

In his sophomore season, Kane began to come into his own, more than doubling his goal production as the team finished 1st in the CCHA again. Unfortunately, despite a runner-up finish in their conference tournament, the Falcons were passed over for the 1983 NCAA Tournament despite having gone 28–8–4 during the season. The following year Bowling Green left little doubt that they were one of the best teams in the country, finishing the regular season atop their conference for the third consecutive season and posted a 17-game winning streak. Kane was the team's leading scorer and named an All-American for his efforts. The Falcons nearly suffered a tragic end when they lost three consecutive games in the CCHA Tournament, but their record was too impressive to overlook and they received an at-large bid to the National Tournament.

After overcoming a 3-goal deficit in the quarterfinal round, Bowling Green shut down perennial power Michigan State in the national semifinal to make their first Championship game appearance. In one of the most memorable games in college hockey history, Kane assisted on the quadruple-overtime game winner, ending the longest championship game in history (as of 2021).

Both Kane and teammate Gino Cavallini capitalized on their instant fame and signed professional contracts with the Calgary Flames, forgoing their final seasons of eligibility. They went through training camp in the fall of 1984 under the legendary Bob Johnson but were assigned to the minor league Moncton Golden Flames to start. Kane played a normal rotation in his first dozen games but, when his scoring didn't materialize, he saw his ice time reduced to just a few shifts per game. Kane was eventually sent to the Milwaukee Admirals and, while he did see his production jump significantly, he retired after the season.

Kane eventually went to work for Proforma, a printing and packing company. He was working as an executive in their Business and Sales department in 2021.

== Statistics ==
=== Regular season and playoffs ===
			Regular Season					Playoffs
Season	Team	League	GP	G	A	Pts	PIM	GP	G	A	Pts	PIM
1979–80	Nepean Raiders	CJHL	—	—	—	—	—	—	—	—	—	—
1980–81	Nepean Raiders	CJHL	45	23	48	71	79	—	—	—	—	—
1981–82	Bowling Green	CCHA	41	10	31	41	31	—	—	—	—	—
1982–83	Bowling Green	CCHA	39	25	33	58	58	—	—	—	—	—
1983–84	Bowling Green	CCHA	43	24	48	72	61	—	—	—	—	—
1984–85	Moncton Golden Flames	AHL	32	0	10	10	17	—	—	—	—	—
1984–85	Milwaukee Admirals	IHL	42	17	16	33	29	—	—	—	—	—
NCAA totals			123	59	112	171	150	—	—	—	—	—

== Awards and honors ==
Award	Year
All-CCHA Second Team	1982–83
CCHA All-Tournament Team	1983
All-CCHA First Team	1983–84
AHCA West First-Team All-American	1983–84
