= Bob Armstrong (ice hockey, born 1961) =

American ice hockey player

- Born: October 2, 1961 Ithaca, New York, U.S.
- Died: January 28, 2012 (aged 50) Williamsville, New York, U.S.
- Height: 5 ft 11 in (180 cm)
- Weight: 188 lb (85 kg; 13 st 6 lb)
- Position: Defenseman
- Shot: Left
- Played for: Clarkson
- Playing career: 1980–1984

Robert A. Armstrong was an American retired ice hockey defenseman who was an All-American for Clarkson.

== Early life ==
Armstrong graduated from Ithaca High School in 1979 and then spent a year at Northwood Prep School. While there he worked as a driver at the 1980 Winter Olympics and served as an usher during the Miracle on Ice game between the United States and the Soviet Union.

== Career ==
Armstrong began attending Clarkson University in the fall of 1980. Clarkson made appearances in the NCAA Tournament in each of Armstrong's first two seasons and, though he was a bit player as a freshman, Armstrong had a much more integral role in 1982. After several of the top players graduated that year, Clarkson declined in Armstrong's junior season. He was named team captain for his senior year and the team rebounded. Armstrong led the defense in scoring and Clarkson finished third in the ECAC Tournament, their best finish in over a decade. The team made its third national tournament with Armstrong before their defeat against Minnesota–Duluth in the quarterfinals. Armstrong had scored with 61 seconds left but the team was unable to tie the series before time ran out.

Armstrong's playing career ended upon his graduation. While working for Stearns & Wheeler as an engineer, Armstrong began coaching high school hockey and baseball. He was involved with several youth teams in the Buffalo–Niagara Falls metropolitan area.

Bob Armstrong was a registered Professional Engineer in the State of New York and became a partner at Stearns & Wheler. Robert was the project manager for the Gloversville - Johnston Wastewater Treatment Facilities Expansion Project.

== Personal life ==
Armstrong died unexpectedly at the age of 50 at the Millard Fillmore Suburban Hospital.

== Statistics ==
=== Regular season and playoffs ===
			Regular Season
Season	Team	League	GP	G	A	Pts	PIM
1980–81	Clarkson	ECAC Hockey	36	3	4	7	28
1981–82	Clarkson	ECAC Hockey	35	5	16	21	48
1982–83	Clarkson	ECAC Hockey	31	6	11	17	30
1983–84	Clarkson	ECAC Hockey	34	9	20	29	72
NCAA totals			136	23	51	74	178

== Awards and honors ==
Award	Year
All-ECAC Hockey First Team	1983–84
AHCA East First-Team All-American	1983–84
