= Garry Galley =

Canadian ice hockey player

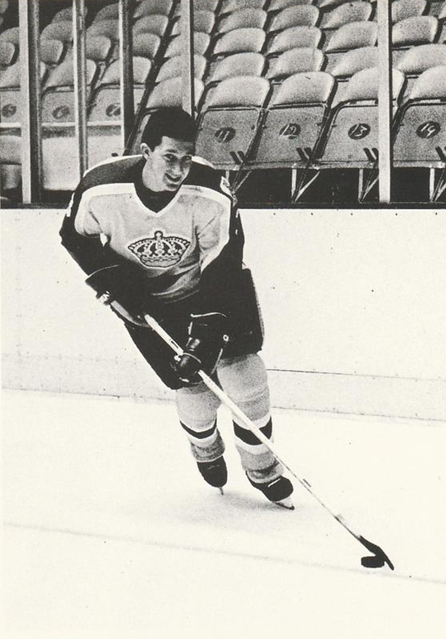
- Born: April 16, 1963 (age 63) Greenfield Park, Quebec, Canada
- Height: 6 ft 0 in (183 cm)
- Weight: 202 lb (92 kg; 14 st 6 lb)
- Position: Defence
- Shot: Left
- Played for: Los Angeles Kings; Washington Capitals; Boston Bruins; Philadelphia Flyers; Buffalo Sabres; New York Islanders
- National team: Canada
- NHL draft: 100th overall, 1983; Los Angeles Kings
- Playing career: 1984–2001

Garry Michael Galley (born April 16, 1963) is a Canadian broadcaster and former professional ice hockey player who played in the National Hockey League (NHL) for 16 seasons from 1984 to 2001. Galley was a co-host of the defunct "More On Sports" radio program on The Team 1200 (now TSN Radio 1200) in Ottawa, Ontario, and is a colour commentator on Hockey Night in Canada. Galley was born in Greenfield Park, Quebec and attended Macdonald-Cartier High School in Saint-Hubert, Quebec.

== Playing career ==
Galley played at Bowling Green (CCHA) from 1981–82 to 1983–84 and was named to the CCHA first all-star team and NCAA All-American in 1984. Galley was drafted 100th overall (5th round) by the Los Angeles Kings in the 1983 NHL entry draft. He played in 1,149 career NHL games, scoring 125 goals and 474 assists for 599 points. He also registered 1,218 career penalty minutes. His best offensive season was the 1993–94 season, when he registered 60 assists and 70 points.

Galley played two and a half seasons (84–85 to 86–87) with the Los Angeles Kings before being traded to the Washington Capitals in February 1987. He played the rest of the 1986–87 season and competed in the 1987–88 season with the Capitals. In July 1988, he signed as a free agent with the Boston Bruins, where he played from 1988–89 to 1991–92. In game two of the 1990 playoff series against Montreal, Galley scored the game-winner in overtime. The goal, at the time, was compared to Bobby Orr's Cup-clinching goal in 1970. Galley played in the 1991 All-Star Game, as well as in 1994 All Star game.

Boston traded Galley to the Philadelphia Flyers in January 1992, and he stayed with the Flyers through to the 1994–95 season, when he was traded to the Buffalo Sabres in April 1995. He played in the 1994 All-Star Game. He played with Buffalo from the end of the 1994–95 season to the 1996–97 season. He then returned to the Kings in July 1997 as a free agent. He played another three years with the Kings from 1997–98 to 1999–2000. He played one year for the New York Islanders for the 2000–2001 season and then retired. After he retired he moved back to Ottawa, Ontario where he was a radio host at the Team 1200.

=== Transaction history ===
- Traded to Washington by Los Angeles for Al Jensen, February 14, 1987.
- Signed as a free agent by Boston, July 8, 1988.
- Traded to Philadelphia by Boston with Wes Walz and Boston's third round choice (Milos Holan) in 1993 Entry Draft for Gord Murphy, Brian Dobbin, Philadelphia's third round choice (Sergei Zholtok) in 1992 Entry Draft and fourth round choice (Charles Paquette) in 1993 Entry Draft, January 2, 1992.
- Traded to Buffalo by Philadelphia for Petr Svoboda, April 7, 1995.
- Signed as a free agent by Los Angeles, July 15, 1997.
- Signed as a free agent by NY Islanders, September 25, 2000.

== Post-playing career ==
Galley pursued a career in broadcasting. In addition to a radio show on Team 1200, he is also a colour analyst. He was the analyst for Ottawa Senators games on Rogers Sportsnet East until the conclusion of the 2009–10 season. He started working on CBC's Hockey Night in Canada in 2008 and re-joined Sportsnet in the 2014–15 season when its parent company, Rogers Media acquired the sole national rights to the NHL in addition to his HNIC role. He was previously teamed with Dave Randorf, Bob Cole, and Paul Romanuk. He works with John Bartlett as the network's number two eastern broadcast team, often involving the Montreal Canadiens or Ottawa Senators. On May 12, 2008, the Nepean Raiders Junior A Hockey Club announced that Galley would be the new head coach for their team beginning in the 2008–09 season. He left the team in December 2009.

== Awards and honours ==
Award	Year
All-CCHA First Team	1982–83, 1983–84
CCHA All-Tournament Team	1983
AHCA West First-Team All-American	1983–84
All-NCAA All-Tournament Team	1984
NHL All-Star Game	1991, 1994
Ottawa Sports Hall of Fame	2010

== Career statistics ==
=== Regular season and playoffs ===
			Regular season					Playoffs
Season	Team	League	GP	G	A	Pts	PIM	GP	G	A	Pts	PIM
1979–80	Ottawa Jr. Senators	CJHL	2	1	0	1	4	—	—	—	—	—
1980–81	Gloucester Rangers	CJHL	49	18	26	44	103	—	—	—	—	—
1981–82	Bowling Green Falcons	CCHA	42	3	36	39	48	—	—	—	—	—
1982–83	Bowling Green Falcons	CCHA	40	17	29	46	40	—	—	—	—	—
1983–84	Bowling Green Falcons	CCHA	44	15	52	67	61	—	—	—	—	—
1984–85	Los Angeles Kings	NHL	78	8	30	38	82	3	1	0	1	2
1985–86	New Haven Nighthawks	AHL	4	2	6	8	6	—	—	—	—	—
1985–86	Los Angeles Kings	NHL	49	9	13	22	46	—	—	—	—	—
1986–87	Los Angeles Kings	NHL	30	5	11	16	67	—	—	—	—	—
1986–87	Washington Capitals	NHL	18	1	10	11	10	2	0	0	0	0
1987–88	Washington Capitals	NHL	58	7	23	30	44	13	2	4	6	13
1988–89	Boston Bruins	NHL	78	8	21	29	80	9	0	1	1	33
1989–90	Boston Bruins	NHL	71	8	27	35	75	21	3	3	6	34
1990–91	Boston Bruins	NHL	70	6	21	27	84	16	1	5	6	17
1991–92	Boston Bruins	NHL	38	2	12	14	83	—	—	—	—	—
1991–92	Philadelphia Flyers	NHL	39	3	15	18	34	—	—	—	—	—
1992–93	Philadelphia Flyers	NHL	83	13	49	62	115	—	—	—	—	—
1993–94	Philadelphia Flyers	NHL	81	10	60	70	91	—	—	—	—	—
1994–95	Philadelphia Flyers	NHL	33	2	20	22	20	—	—	—	—	—
1994–95	Buffalo Sabres	NHL	14	1	9	10	10	5	0	3	3	4
1995–96	Buffalo Sabres	NHL	78	10	44	54	81	—	—	—	—	—
1996–97	Buffalo Sabres	NHL	71	4	34	38	102	12	0	6	6	14
1997–98	Los Angeles Kings	NHL	74	9	28	37	63	4	0	1	1	2
1998–99	Los Angeles Kings	NHL	60	4	12	16	30	—	—	—	—	—
1999–2000	Los Angeles Kings	NHL	70	9	21	30	52	4	0	0	0	0
2000–01	New York Islanders	NHL	56	6	14	20	59	—	—	—	—	—
NHL totals			1,149	125	474	599	1,218	89	7	23	30	119

=== International ===
Year	Team	Event	GP	G	A	Pts	PIM
1993	Canada	WC	8	1	2	3	0
1996	Canada	WC	8	0	2	2	6
Senior totals			16	1	4	5	6

== International play ==
Galley played for Canada at the 1993 World Championship in Munich, where the Canadian squad placed fourth (8-1-2-3-0) under head coach Mike Keenan. He won silver (losing to the Czech Republic 4–2) in the World Men's Championship (IIHF) in 1996 under head coach Tom Renney."Hockey Canada". Hockey Canada Profiles.

== See also ==
- List of NHL players with 1,000 games played
