= David Ellett =

Canadian ice hockey player (born 1964)

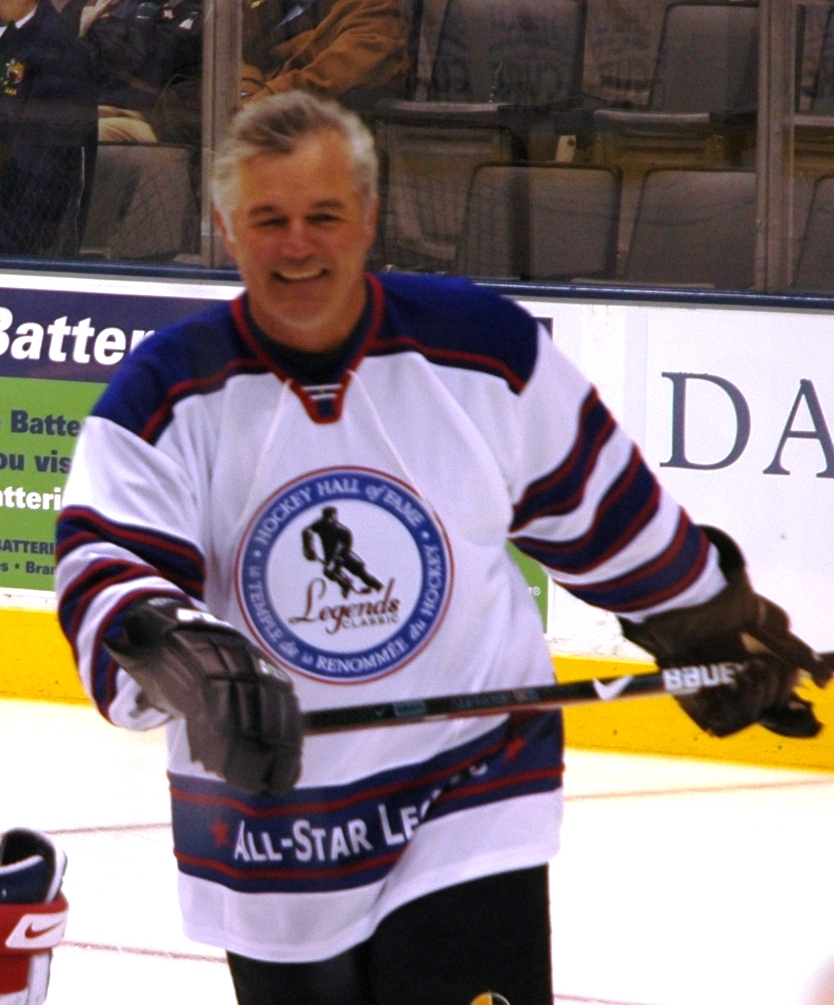
- Ellett in 2008
- Born: March 30, 1964 (age 62) Cleveland, Ohio, U.S.
- Height: 6 ft 2 in (188 cm)
- Weight: 205 lb (93 kg; 14 st 9 lb)
- Position: Defence
- Shot: Left
- Played for: Winnipeg Jets; Toronto Maple Leafs; New Jersey Devils; Boston Bruins; St. Louis Blues
- National team: Canada
- NHL draft: 75th overall, 1982; Winnipeg Jets
- Playing career: 1984–2000

David George John Ellett (born March 30, 1964) is an American-born Canadian former professional ice hockey defenceman who played in the National Hockey League (NHL) for 20 seasons. He was born in Cleveland because his father, Bob, was a minor-league hockey player playing for the Cleveland Barons of the AHL.

== Playing career ==
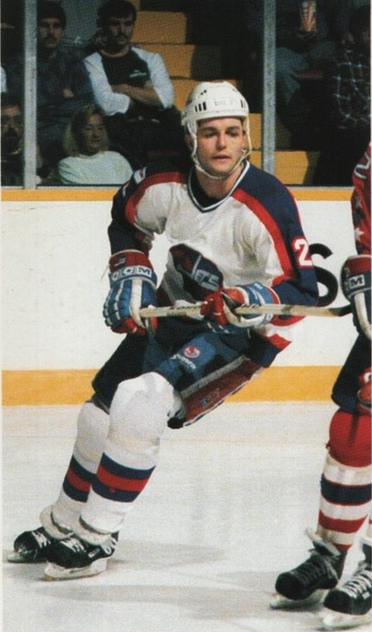
1988 photo of David Ellett for Winnipeg Jets

Ellett was drafted 75th overall by the Winnipeg Jets in the 1982 NHL entry draft and then played the next two seasons at Bowling Green State University. In Ellett's second (and final) season at BGSU (1983–84), the Falcons won the NCAA Championship. When Ellett joined the Jets in 1984, he was a solid defenseman right away, scoring 38 points and garnering a +20 plus/minus rating. He became part of a solid Jets nucleus in the mid-to-late 80's that had the misfortune of playing in the same division as the dominant Edmonton Oilers and Calgary Flames. As a result, Ellett did not garner very much late-round playoff experience with the Jets.

Ellett's most notable moment with the Jets came in the 1990 Smythe Division semi-final series against the Edmonton Oilers during the 1990 Stanley Cup Playoffs. On April 10, at the Winnipeg Arena, with the game tied at 2–2 in the second overtime period, Dave Ellett scored a power play goal to give the Jets the win and a 3–1 series lead. Despite losing the next 3 games to the Oilers, this goal is considered the most memorable goal in the Jets' NHL history.

In the middle of the 1990–91 season, Ellett was traded to the Toronto Maple Leafs with Paul Fenton for Ed Olczyk and Mark Osborne. It was with the Leafs that Ellett transitioned from an offensive defenceman into a solid two-way rearguard. He was an integral part to the Leafs clubs of 1993 and 1994 that reached the Conference Finals.

Ellett was traded to the New Jersey Devils with Doug Gilmour in the 1996–97 season, but only played with the club until the end of the season. He then played with the Boston Bruins for two years and then the St. Louis Blues for a year before retiring. He played his 1000th career game with Boston on March 1, 1998, against the New York Islanders. He retired in 2000.

In 1989 Ellett was the subject of controversy when he decided to play for Team Canada in the World Championships. Bob Johnson, coach of the American team, complained that Ellett had to play for the United States because of his birthplace and because he attended Team USA's training camp for the 1987 Canada Cup. Ellett was allowed to play for Team Canada because he never actually played for the USA internationally.

Ellett was part of one of Wayne Gretzky's most-remembered goals. In Game 7 of the 1993 Campbell Conference Finals between the Leafs and the Los Angeles Kings, Gretzky scored a hat trick. He scored his third goal from behind the net by banking it off Ellett's skate and past the Toronto goaltender, Félix Potvin. Ellett returned the favor by scoring for Toronto with just over a minute remaining, but Los Angeles hung on to win the game and go to the Stanley Cup Finals against Montreal.

== Awards and honours ==
Award	Year
All-CCHA Second Team	1983-84
CCHA All-Tournament Team	1984
All-NCAA All-Tournament Team	1984
NHL All-Star Game	1989, 1992

== Records ==
- Most points by a Toronto Maple Leafs defenceman in a playoff year (18 in 1994)
- Most assists by a Toronto Maple Leafs defenceman in a playoff year (15 in 1994)

== Career statistics ==
=== Regular season and playoffs ===
			Regular season					Playoffs
Season	Team	League	GP	G	A	Pts	PIM	GP	G	A	Pts	PIM
1981–82	Ottawa Jr. Senators	CJHL	50	9	35	44	—	—	—	—	—	—
1982–83	Bowling Green Falcons	CCHA	40	4	13	17	34	—	—	—	—	—
1983–84	Bowling Green Falcons	CCHA	43	15	39	54	96	—	—	—	—	—
1984–85	Winnipeg Jets	NHL	80	11	27	38	85	8	1	5	6	4
1985–86	Winnipeg Jets	NHL	80	15	31	46	96	3	0	1	1	0
1986–87	Winnipeg Jets	NHL	78	13	31	44	53	10	0	8	8	2
1987–88	Winnipeg Jets	NHL	68	13	45	58	106	5	1	2	3	10
1988–89	Winnipeg Jets	NHL	75	22	34	56	62	—	—	—	—	—
1989–90	Winnipeg Jets	NHL	77	17	29	46	96	7	2	0	2	6
1990–91	Winnipeg Jets	NHL	17	4	7	11	6	—	—	—	—	—
1990–91	Toronto Maple Leafs	NHL	60	8	30	38	69	—	—	—	—	—
1991–92	Toronto Maple Leafs	NHL	79	18	33	51	95	—	—	—	—	—
1992–93	Toronto Maple Leafs	NHL	70	6	34	40	46	21	4	8	12	8
1993–94	Toronto Maple Leafs	NHL	68	7	36	43	42	18	3	15	18	31
1994–95	Toronto Maple Leafs	NHL	33	5	10	15	26	7	0	2	2	0
1995–96	Toronto Maple Leafs	NHL	80	3	19	22	59	6	0	0	0	4
1996–97	Toronto Maple Leafs	NHL	56	4	10	14	34	—	—	—	—	—
1996–97	New Jersey Devils	NHL	20	2	5	7	6	10	0	3	3	10
1997–98	Boston Bruins	NHL	82	3	20	23	67	6	0	1	1	6
1998–99	Boston Bruins	NHL	54	0	6	6	25	8	0	0	0	4
1999–2000	St. Louis Blues	NHL	52	2	8	10	12	7	0	1	1	2
NHL totals			1,129	153	415	568	985	116	11	46	57	87

=== International ===
Year	Team	Event	GP	G	A	Pts	PIM
1989	Canada	WC	10	4	2	6	14

== See also ==
- List of NHL players with 1,000 games played
