= Rick Kosti =

Canadian ice hockey player

- Born: September 13, 1963 (age 63) Kincaid, Saskatchewan, Canada
- Height: 5 ft 10 in (178 cm)
- Weight: 183 lb (83 kg; 13 st 1 lb)
- Position: Goaltender
- Played for: Minnesota Duluth; Moncton Golden Flames; Salt Lake Golden Eagles
- National team: Canada
- Playing career: 1983–1988

Rick Kosti is a Canadian retired ice hockey goaltender who was a two-time All-American for Minnesota Duluth.

== Career ==
After wrapping up his junior career with the Weyburn Red Wings, Kosti began attending the University of Minnesota Duluth in 1983 and had an immediate impact on the program. Kosti's arrival coincided with the program's first WCHA title, in their 19 season of league play. He also led the team to its first conference tournament championship and second NCAA Tournament appearance. Kosti's stellar play in net allowed the Bulldogs to win a very close quarterfinal match and then defeat North Dakota in overtime in the national semifinal to appear in the 1984 championship game. Kosti and the Bulldogs had control of the match for most of the game but a 3-goal third period from Bowling Green tied the game and the two ended up playing the longest title game in NCAA history. Kosti ended with 50 saves in the match but couldn't stop the last shot and UMD fell in the 4th overtime.

Kosti's sophomore season turned out even better as he set an NCAA record with 33 wins on the year. UMD repeated as dual WCHA champions and the team was expected to make a charge for the NCAA championship. The Bulldogs had an easier time with their quarterfinal match and made the frozen four, facing ECAC Hockey champion Rensselaer. The two teams fought a back and forth duel and ended regulation with a 5–5 tie. At the end of the second overtime a scrum broke out between the two and RPI began the third overtime with a power play. The Bulldogs couldn't stop the Engineers from taking advantage of the situation and were relegated to the consolation game where they ended their season with yet another overtime match, this time defeating Boston College 7–6. By happenstance, as of 2021 the loss to RPI was the last time Minnesota Duluth has lost an overtime game in the NCAA tournament.

After the season, Kosti gave up his final two years of eligibility and signed a professional contract with the Calgary Flames. He began the next season with the Moncton Golden Flames but ended up appearing in only 15 games during the season. He joined the Canadian national team in 1986 and played the next two years with the program, becoming the team's 3rd goaltender at the 1988 Winter Olympics because he didn't dress for any of the games he's sometimes left off of the roster. Kosti came close to appearing in an NHL game in November of that season. Regular starter Mike Vernon had taken a hard shot off the mask and was held out for precautionary reasons. Kosti was called up and served as a backup on the 21st against the Pittsburgh Penguins but rode the bench the entire game. When Vernon was cleared for the following match, Kosti was returned to the national team. After the Olympics, Kosti finished out the season with the Salt Lake Golden Eagles. After his entry-level deal with the Flames expired in 1988, it was not renewed and he wasn't invited to the team's training camp. Kosti retired as a player and began pursuing a career in business.

Kosti ended up at the University of Calgary, earning his MBA from the school. He moved to Houston, Texas and worked for several companies as a recruiter. As of 2021 he was working for Cisco Systems.

== Statistics ==
=== Regular season and playoffs ===
			Regular season									Playoffs
Season	Team	League	GP	W	L	T	MIN	GA	SO	GAA	SV%	GP	W	L	MIN	GA	SO	GAA	SV%
1980–81	Swift Current Broncos	SJHL	35	16	16	0	1874	161	0	5.15	—	—	—	—	—	—	—	—	—
1981–82	Medicine Hat Tigers	WHL	6	1	2	0	290	38	0	7.86	.827	—	—	—	—	—	—	—	—
1982–83	Weyburn Red Wings	SJHL	—	—	—	—	—	—	—	—	—	—	—	—	—	—	—	—	—
1983–84	Minnesota Duluth	WCHA	38	27	9	2	2347	119	2	3.04	.898	—	—	—	—	—	—	—	—
1984–85	Minnesota Duluth	WCHA	45	33	9	3	2736	146	1	3.20	.890	—	—	—	—	—	—	—	—
1985–86	Moncton Golden Flames	AHL	15	5	7	1	705	44	1	3.74	.858	—	—	—	—	—	—	—	—
1987–88	Salt Lake Golden Eagles	IHL	19	3	9	2	—	—	0	4.40	.849	—	—	—	—	—	—	—	—
NCAA totals			83	60	18	5	5083	265	3	3.13	.894	—	—	—	—	—	—	—	—

=== International ===
Year	Team	Event	GP	W	L	T	MIN	GA	GAA	SV%
1986–87	Canada	International	29	—	—	—	1736	85	2.94	—
1987–88	Canada	International	18	—	—	—	731	54	4.43	—

== Awards and honors ==
Award	Year
All-WCHA Second Team	1983–84
AHCA West Second-Team All-American	1983–84
All-NCAA All-Tournament Team	1984
All-WCHA First Team	1984–85
AHCA West First-Team All-American	1984–85

Awards and achievements
Preceded by Craig Redmond	WCHA Freshman of the Year; 1983–84	Succeeded by Brett Hull
