= Jamie Wansbrough =

Canadian ice hockey player

- Born: June 30, 1963 (age 63) Toronto, Ontario, Canada
- Height: 5 ft 11 in (180 cm)
- Weight: 176 lb (80 kg; 12 st 8 lb)
- Position: Right Wing
- Shot: Right
- Played for: Bowling Green; ERC Sonthofen; Indianapolis Checkers
- Playing career: 1982–1987

Jamie Wansbrough is a Canadian retired ice hockey right wing who was an All-American for Bowling Green and scored in the longest championship game in NCAA history (as of 2021).

== Career ==
Wansbrough attended St. Michael's College School, playing for the local St. Michael's Buzzers. He rapidly ascended to being one of the top players in the league and was named league MVP in 1982 while helping his team win the Sutherland Cup as the best Junior B team in Ontario. After graduating, he began attending Bowling Green, joining a team that was already a power in the CCHA. Wansbrough quickly established himself as a goal scorer, netting 20 goals as a freshman, and helped the Falcons repeat as regular season champions. The team easily bowled over their opposition until the title match where they fell to Michigan State in overtime. Despite their stellar record, the loss turned out to be disastrous as BG was passed over for an NCAA tournament bid in spite of possessing a better record and finish than the team selected instead, Minnesota–Duluth.

Spurred on by the slight, Wansbrough's scoring improved in his sophomore season and he helped Bowling Green win their third consecutive league title while leading the club in goals. Their season included a 17-game winning streak and made it all but impossible for the NCAA to ignore the Falcons regardless of their playoff performance. Unfortunately, the team seemed bent on testing that assertion by losing three consecutive playoff games (two in overtime) to limp towards the national tournament.

Even after receiving a tournament bid, BG lost their first game of the 1984 Tournament by three goals, meaning they had to win the next by at least 4 to advance. The Falcons surged back with a 4–1 win in regulation, tying the series at 7 goals apiece and forced overtime. They managed to earn the winner in the first overtime, staving off a monumental collapse for the program. In the semifinal the team met Michigan State and the defense locked down the high-powered Spartans, winning the match 2–1. Bowling Green entered their first ever championship game with a chance not only for an NCAA title, but also to get revenge for their snub the year earlier because they were facing Minnesota–Duluth. Bowling Green scored first but UMD quickly responded and then slowly built a lead over the next 40 minutes. Wansbrough cut their lead in half early in the third, but the Bulldogs' lead was back up to two with just over of 8 minutes remaining. The Falcons then staged a stunning comeback that included a fluke goal with less than 2 minutes left and the two teams ended regulation with a 4–4 tie. The succeeding overtime went on and on, with three 10-minute periods passing and nothing to show for it in the score of the game. Bowling Green eventually netted the game-winner in the later half of the 4th extra frame, winning the national championship.

Several of the team's top players left early, which deprived the Falcons of scoring punch, but allowed Wansbrough to take over a more prominent role with the team. While BG dropped down to 4th in the conference, Wansbrough led the team in scoring and was named second-team all-conference. For his senior season, Wansbrough was named team captain and, while leading the team in scoring again, pushed the team up into a second-place finish in the CCHA. BG lost in the conference semifinals and ended up in third-place in the CCHA Tournament. Wansbrough ended his college career as the program's all-time leading goal scorer, a position he continues to occupy as of 2021, and is one of the top NCAA goal scorers of all time.

After graduating with a degree in marketing, Wansbrough played professional hockey for a year before retiring as a player. He returned to the Toronto area and began working in sales for CHUM-FM. He remained in the broadcasting business for 22 years before becoming President of LJ Media Consultants in 2012. While remaining in that position, he concurrently was the Director of National Sales and Marketing for ELMNT FM, holding both positions as of 2021.

He was inducted into the Bowling Green Athletic Hall of Fame in 1991.

== Statistics ==
=== Regular season and playoffs ===
			Regular Season					Playoffs
Season	Team	League	GP	G	A	Pts	PIM	GP	G	A	Pts	PIM
1979–80	St. Michael's Buzzers	MJBHL	32	15	23	38	30	—	—	—	—	—
1980–81	St. Michael's Buzzers	MJBHL	39	39	48	87	78	—	—	—	—	—
1981–82	St. Michael's Buzzers	MJBHL	—	—	—	—	—	—	—	—	—	—
1982–83	Bowling Green	CCHA	40	23	17	40	22	—	—	—	—	—
1983–84	Bowling Green	CCHA	40	34	16	50	18	—	—	—	—	—
1984–85	Bowling Green	CCHA	42	37	33	70	28	—	—	—	—	—
1985–86	Bowling Green	CCHA	42	33	44	77	28	—	—	—	—	—
1986–87	ERC Sonthofen	Oberliga	23	25	20	45	20	—	—	—	—	—
1986–87	Indianapolis Checkers	IHL	10	3	3	6	0	—	—	—	—	—
NCAA totals			164	127	110	237	96	—	—	—	—	—

== Awards and honors ==
Award	Year
All-CCHA Second Team	1984–85
All-CCHA First Team	1985–86
AHCA West Second-Team All-American	1985–86
