= 1983 CCHA men's ice hockey tournament =

1983 CCHA Men's ice hockey tournament
- Dates: March 4–12, 1983
- Teams: 8
- Finals site: Joe Louis Arena; Detroit, Michigan
- Champions: Michigan State (2nd title)
- Winning coach: Ron Mason (5th title)
- MVP: Mike David (Bowling Green)
- CCHA Men's Ice Hockey Tournaments

The 1983 CCHA Men's Ice Hockey Tournament was the 12th CCHA Men's Ice Hockey Tournament. It was played between March 4 and March 12, 1983. First round games were played at campus sites, while 'final four' games were played at Joe Louis Arena in Detroit, Michigan. By winning the tournament, Michigan State received the Central Collegiate Hockey Association's automatic bid to the 1983 NCAA Division I Men's Ice Hockey Tournament.

== Format ==
The tournament featured three rounds of play. The four teams that finished below eighth place in the standings were not eligible for postseason play. In the quarterfinals, the first and eighth seeds, the second and seventh seeds, the third seed and sixth seeds and the fourth seed and fifth seeds played a two-game series where the team that scored the higher number of goals after the games was declared the victor and advanced to the semifinals. In the semifinals, the remaining highest and lowest seeds and second highest and second lowest seeds play a single-game, with the winners advancing to the finals. The tournament champion receives an automatic bid to the 1983 NCAA Division I Men's Ice Hockey Tournament.

== Conference standings ==
Note: GP = Games played; W = Wins; L = Losses; T = Ties; PTS = Points; GF = Goals For; GA = Goals Against

1982–83 Central Collegiate Hockey Association standings
	Conference							Overall					
	GP	W	L	T	PTS	GF	GA	GP	W	L	T	GF	GA
Bowling Green†	32	24	5	3	51	200	115	40	28	8	4	238	143
Michigan State*	32	23	9	0	46	132	83	42	30	11	1	187	115
Ohio State	32	21	7	4	46	159	107	40	26	9	5	204	140
Michigan Tech	32	20	12	0	40	162	124	40	22	17	1	189	157
Northern Michigan	32	16	13	3	35	125	113	40	18	18	4	147	153
Miami	32	15	16	1	31	136	142	36	18	17	1	165	156
Ferris State	32	12	16	4	28	139	145	38	16	18	4	141	161
Notre Dame	32	13	17	2	28	141	170	36	13	21	2	155	206
Michigan	32	11	21	0	22	124	161	36	14	22	0	157	175
Western Michigan	32	10	20	2	22	105	135	36	11	23	2	117	156
Lake Superior State	32	10	21	1	21	110	140	36	12	23	1	131	157
Illinois-Chicago	32	6	24	2	14	82	160	36	6	28	2	95	185
Championship: Michigan State † indicates conference regular season champion * indicates conference tournament champion

== Bracket ==
Quarterfinals; March 4–6
1	Bowling Green	8	7	–
8	Notre Dame	3	2	–
2	Michigan State	2	5	–
7	Ferris State	4	1	–
(Pairings are reseeded after the first round)
3	Ohio State	6	4	–
6	Miami	2	6	–
4	Michigan Tech	2	3	–
5	Northern Michigan	3	3	–

Semifinals; March 10
1	Bowling Green	3
5	Northern Michigan	0
2	Michigan State	8
3	Ohio State	3

Championship; March 12
1	Bowling Green	3
2	Michigan State	4*
Consolation Game
3	Ohio State	8
5	Northern Michigan	6

Note: * denotes overtime period(s)

=== First round ===
==== (1) Bowling Green vs. (8) Notre Dame ====
Bowling Green	8 – 3	Notre Dame	BGSU Ice Arena

Bowling Green	7 – 2	Notre Dame	BGSU Ice Arena

Bowling Green won series 15–5

==== (2) Michigan State vs. (7) Ferris State ====
Michigan State	2 – 4	Ferris State	Munn Ice Arena

Michigan State	5 – 1	Ferris State	Munn Ice Arena

Michigan State won series 7–5

==== (3) Ohio State vs. (6) Miami ====
Ohio State	6 – 2	Miami	OSU Ice Rink

Ohio State	4 – 6	Miami	OSU Ice Rink

Ohio State won series 10–8

==== (4) Michigan Tech vs. (5) Northern Michigan ====
Michigan Tech	2 – 3	Northern Michigan	MacInnes Student Ice Arena

Michigan Tech	3 – 3	Northern Michigan	MacInnes Student Ice Arena

Northern Michigan won series 6–5

=== Semifinals ===
==== (1) Bowling Green vs. (5) Northern Michigan ====
March 10	Bowling Green	3 – 0	Northern Michigan	Joe Louis Arena

==== (2) Michigan State vs. (3) Ohio State ====
March 10	Michigan State	8 – 3	Ohio State	Joe Louis Arena

=== Consolation Game ===
==== (3) Ohio State vs. (5) Northern Michigan ====
March 12	Ohio State	8 – 6	Northern Michigan	Joe Louis Arena

=== Championship ===
==== (1) Bowling Green vs. (2) Michigan State ====
March 12	Bowling Green	3 – 4	OT	Michigan State	Joe Louis Arena

== Tournament awards ==
=== All-Tournament Team ===
- F Kelly Miller (Michigan State)
- F Gord Flegel (Michigan State)
- F Dan Kane (Bowling Green)
- D Garry Galley (Bowling Green)
- D Mike Pikul (Bowling Green)
- G Mike David* (Bowling Green)

* Most Valuable Player(s)
