= Tom Kurvers =

American ice hockey player (1962–2021)

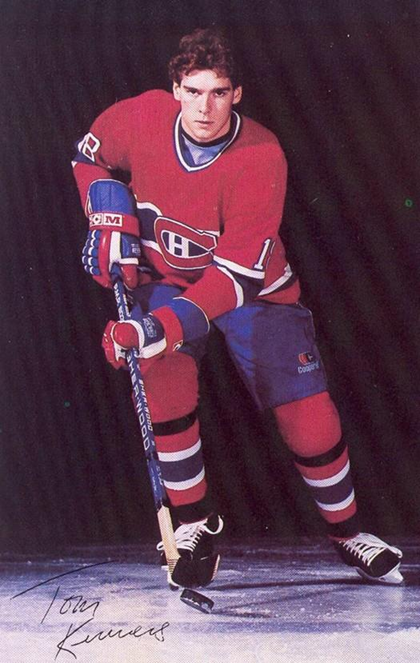
- Kurvers in 1984 photo
- Born: September 14, 1962 Minneapolis, Minnesota, U.S.
- Died: June 21, 2021 (aged 58) Saint Paul, Minnesota, U.S.
- Height: 6 ft 0 in (183 cm)
- Weight: 190 lb (86 kg; 13 st 8 lb)
- Position: Defense
- Shot: Left
- Played for: Montreal Canadiens; Buffalo Sabres; New Jersey Devils; Toronto Maple Leafs; Vancouver Canucks; New York Islanders; Mighty Ducks of Anaheim
- NHL draft: 145th overall, 1981; Montreal Canadiens
- Playing career: 1984–1996

Thomas James Kurvers (September 14, 1962 – June 21, 2021) was an American professional ice hockey defenseman in the National Hockey League (NHL). He spent eleven seasons in the NHL between 1984 and 1995. He won the 1984 Hobey Baker award as the best collegiate ice hockey player, and he won the Stanley Cup with the Montreal Canadiens in 1986. After his playing career, he was an executive for the Phoenix Coyotes, Tampa Bay Lightning and Minnesota Wild.

== Playing career ==
Kurvers played collegiately at the University of Minnesota Duluth, and was selected 145th overall by the Montreal Canadiens in the 1981 NHL entry draft following his freshman season. His time at Duluth culminated in winning the Hobey Baker Award, given to the most outstanding collegiate hockey player in the National Collegiate Athletic Association (NCAA), as a senior in the 1983–84 season after registering 76 points in just 43 games.

Kurvers made his National Hockey League (NHL) debut in the 1984–85 season with the Montreal Canadiens, with whom he won the Stanley Cup in 1986. After two full seasons with the Canadiens, and one game in the 1986–87 season, he was traded to the Buffalo Sabres for a draft pick.

Before the 1987–88 season, the Sabres traded Kurvers to the New Jersey Devils. He played his most productive post-season hockey that year for the Devils, posting 15 points in 19 games during their run to the 1988 Wales Conference Finals. He followed up by notching career highs of 16 goals and 66 points in the 1988–89 season. He played two full seasons, and one game in the 1989–90 season, with the Devils before being traded to the Toronto Maple Leafs for the pick ultimately used to draft Scott Niedermayer.

Kurvers was a highly skilled, puck-moving defenceman, especially dangerous on the power play. Later in his career, Kurvers became a journeyman, making stops with the Vancouver Canucks, New York Islanders, and Mighty Ducks of Anaheim before leaving the league after the 1994–95 season. He played a season in Japan before retiring.

In his NHL career, Kurvers appeared in 659 games. He scored 93 goals and added 328 assists for 421 points. He also appeared in 57 Stanley Cup playoff games, scoring eight goals and recording 22 assists.

== Post-hockey career ==
Following his retirement from playing professional hockey, Kurvers landed a job as a radio commentator for the Phoenix Coyotes, in part due to his connection to former Montreal teammate Bobby Smith who was the general manager in Phoenix at the time. Following one season in that capacity, he was hired as a professional scout by the Coyotes. Kurvers was promoted to director of player personnel in 2005.

In 2008, Kurvers was named assistant general manager of the Tampa Bay Lightning. He became the interim general manager for the Lightning at the end of the 2009–10 season. From 2011 to 2018, Kurvers served as the senior advisor to the general manager of the Tampa Bay Lightning before being named the assistant general manager of the Minnesota Wild.

Following his death, the Wild annually host a prospect tournament named after Kurvers, featuring prospects from the Wild, Chicago Blackhawks, and St. Louis Blues.

== Personal life ==
Born in Minneapolis, Minnesota, Tom Kurvers grew up in nearby Bloomington.

Kurvers and his wife Heather had two children together. He also had two daughters from his first marriage. In January 2019, Kurvers was diagnosed with adenocarcinoma, a type of non-small-cell lung cancer. Kurvers died on June 21, 2021, from cancer at the age of 58.

== Awards and honors ==
In 1991, Kurvers was inducted into the University of Minnesota Duluth Hall of Fame.

Award	Year	Ref
All-WCHA First Team	1983–84	
AHCA West First-Team All-American	1983–84	
Stanley Cup champion	1986	

== Career statistics ==
=== Regular season and playoffs ===
			Regular season					Playoffs
Season	Team	League	GP	G	A	Pts	PIM	GP	G	A	Pts	PIM
1979–80	Bloomington Jefferson High School	HS-MN	—	—	—	—	—	—	—	—	—	—
1980–81	Bloomington Jefferson High School	HS-MN	—	—	—	—	—	—	—	—	—	—
1980–81	University of Minnesota Duluth	WCHA	39	6	24	30	48	—	—	—	—	—
1981–82	University of Minnesota Duluth	WCHA	37	11	31	42	18	—	—	—	—	—
1982–83	University of Minnesota Duluth	WCHA	45	8	36	44	42	—	—	—	—	—
1983–84	University of Minnesota Duluth	WCHA	43	18	58	76	46	—	—	—	—	—
1984–85	Montreal Canadiens	NHL	75	10	35	45	30	12	0	6	6	6
1985–86	Montreal Canadiens	NHL	62	7	23	30	36	—	—	—	—	—
1986–87	Montreal Canadiens	NHL	1	0	0	0	2	—	—	—	—	—
1986–87	Buffalo Sabres	NHL	55	6	17	23	22	—	—	—	—	—
1987–88	New Jersey Devils	NHL	56	5	29	34	46	19	6	9	15	38
1988–89	New Jersey Devils	NHL	74	16	50	66	38	—	—	—	—	—
1989–90	New Jersey Devils	NHL	1	0	0	0	0	—	—	—	—	—
1989–90	Toronto Maple Leafs	NHL	70	15	37	52	29	5	0	3	3	4
1990–91	Toronto Maple Leafs	NHL	19	0	3	3	8	—	—	—	—	—
1990–91	Vancouver Canucks	NHL	32	4	23	27	20	6	2	2	4	12
1991–92	New York Islanders	NHL	74	9	47	56	30	—	—	—	—	—
1992–93	Capital District Islanders	AHL	7	3	4	7	8	—	—	—	—	—
1992–93	New York Islanders	NHL	52	8	30	38	38	12	0	2	2	6
1993–94	New York Islanders	NHL	66	9	31	40	47	3	0	0	0	2
1994–95	Mighty Ducks of Anaheim	NHL	22	4	3	7	6	—	—	—	—	—
1995–96	Seibu Tetsudo	JPN	40	18	34	52	85	2	1	2	3	36
NHL totals			659	93	328	421	352	57	8	22	30	68

=== International ===
Year	Team	Event	GP	G	A	Pts	PIM
1982	United States	WJC	7	3	3	6	16
1987	United States	WC	10	3	1	4	11
1989	United States	WC	10	2	2	4	8
Junior totals			7	3	3	6	16
Senior totals			20	5	3	8	19

Awards and achievements
Preceded by Bob Mason	WCHA Most Valuable Player; 1983–84	Succeeded by Bill Watson
Preceded by Mark Fusco	Winner of the Hobey Baker Award; 1983–84	Succeeded by Bill Watson
Sporting positions
Preceded by Brian Lawton	General Manager of the Tampa Bay Lightning; Interim; 2010	Succeeded by Steve Yzerman
