= 1984 WCHA men's ice hockey tournament =

Ice hockey tournament

1984 WCHA Men's ice hockey tournament
- Dates: February 25-March 11, 1984
- Teams: 6
- Finals site: Williams Arena; Minneapolis, Minnesota
- Champions: Minnesota-Duluth (1st title)
- Winning coach: Mike Sertich (1st title)
- WCHA Men's Ice Hockey Tournaments

The 1984 WCHA Men's Ice Hockey Tournament was the 25th conference playoff in league history and 32nd season where a WCHA champion was crowned. The tournament was played between February 25 and March 11, 1984. First round and semifinal games were played at home team campus sites while the championship match was held at the Williams Arena in Minneapolis, Minnesota. By winning the tournament, Minnesota-Duluth received the WCHA's automatic bid to the 1984 NCAA Division I Men's Ice Hockey Tournament.

== Format ==
All member teams were eligible for the tournament and were seeded No. 1 through No. 6 according to their final conference standing, with a tiebreaker system used to seed teams with an identical number of points accumulated. Unlike previous years the Broadmoor Trophy recipient's (Minnesota-Duluth) home venue was not used for the tournament championship round. Instead the Williams Arena, the home of the Minnesota Golden Gophers, served as the site for the Championship game. Each series were two-game matchups with the team that scored the most goals advancing to the succeeding round. The top two seeded teams received byes into the semifinal round while the third seed and sixth seed and the fourth seed and fifth seed met in the first round. The teams that advanced to the semifinal were re-seeded according to the final regular season conference standings, with the first seed matched against lowest remaining seed in one semifinal game and the second seed meeting with the other advancing team with the winners meeting in the championship round. The Tournament Champion received an automatic bid to the 1984 NCAA Division I Men's Ice Hockey Tournament.

=== Conference standings ===
Note: GP = Games played; W = Wins; L = Losses; T = Ties; PTS = Points; GF = Goals For; GA = Goals Against

1983–84 Western Collegiate Hockey Association standings
	Conference							Overall					
	GP	W	L	T	PTS	GF	GA	GP	W	L	T	GF	GA
Minnesota-Duluth†*	26	19	5	2	40	138	85	43	29	12	2	216	140
North Dakota	26	16	8	2	34	117	82	45	31	12	2	204	145
Minnesota	26	16	9	1	33	106	97	40	27	11	2	190	154
Wisconsin	26	11	14	1	23	105	107	39	21	17	1	182	168
Denver	26	8	18	0	16	119	152	39	14	25	0	182	203
Colorado College	26	5	21	0	10	77	139	35	9	25	1	109	168
Championship: Minnesota-Duluth † indicates conference regular season champion * indicates conference tournament champion

== Bracket ==
Teams are reseeded after the first round

First Round; February 25–26
3	Minnesota	3	4	7
6	Colorado College	1	1	2
4	Wisconsin	5	8	13
5	Denver	3	5	8

Semifinals; March 2–3
1	Minnesota-Duluth	6	9	15
4	Wisconsin	3	0	3
2	North Dakota	4	5	9
3	Minnesota	3	4	7

Championship; March 10–11
1	Minnesota-Duluth	8	4	12
2	North Dakota	1	5	6

Note: * denotes overtime period(s)

=== First round ===
==== (3) Minnesota vs. (6) Colorado College ====
February 25	Minnesota	3 – 1	Colorado College	Williams Arena

February 26	Minnesota	4 – 1	Colorado College	Williams Arena

Minnesota won series 7–2

==== (4) Wisconsin vs. (5) Denver ====
February 25	Wisconsin	5 – 3	Denver	Dane County Coliseum

February 26	Wisconsin	8 – 5	Denver	Dane County Coliseum

Wisconsin won series 13–8

=== Semifinals ===
==== (1) Minnesota-Duluth vs. (4) Wisconsin ====
March 2	Minnesota-Duluth	6 – 3	Wisconsin	Duluth Arena Auditorium

March 3	Minnesota-Duluth	9 – 0	Wisconsin	Duluth Arena Auditorium

Minnesota-Duluth won series 15–3

==== (2) North Dakota vs. (3) Minnesota ====
March 2	North Dakota	4 – 3	Minnesota	Winter Sports Center

March 3	North Dakota	5 – 4	Minnesota	Winter Sports Center

North Dakota won series 9–7

=== Championship ===
==== (1) Minnesota-Duluth vs. (2) North Dakota ====
March 10	Minnesota-Duluth	8 – 1	North Dakota	Williams Arena

March 11	Minnesota-Duluth	4 – 5	North Dakota	Williams Arena

Minnesota-Duluth won series 12–6

== Tournament awards ==
None

== See also ==
- Western Collegiate Hockey Association men's champions
