= 1983–84 NCAA Division I men's ice hockey season =

- Duration: October 1983– March 24, 1984
- NCAA tournament: 1984
- National championship: 1980 Olympic Arena; Lake Placid, New York
- NCAA champion: Bowling Green
- Hobey Baker Award: Tom Kurvers (Minnesota–Duluth)

The 1983–84 NCAA Division I men's ice hockey season began in October 1983 and concluded with the 1984 NCAA Division I Men's Ice Hockey Tournament's championship game on March 24, 1984 at the Olympic Center in Lake Placid, New York. This was the 37th season in which an NCAA ice hockey championship was held and is the 90th year overall where an NCAA school fielded a team.

Notre Dame demoted their program to club status for this season but returned to the Division I ranks the following year.

== Season Outlook ==
=== Pre-season polls ===
The top teams in the nation.

The WMPL poll was voted on by coaches before the start of the season. The College Hockey Statistics Bureau (CHSB) / WDOM poll was voted on by media after the season started.

This was the last season WDOM would release the CHSB poll.

WMPL Poll
Rank	Team
1	Minnesota (5)
2	North Dakota (3)
3	Michigan State (2)
4	Ohio State
5	Providence
6	Bowling Green
7	Wisconsin
8	Minnesota Duluth
9	Rensselaer
10	Michigan Tech

CHSB / WDOM Poll
Rank	Team
1	Minnesota (6)
2	Bowling Green (4)
3	Boston College
4	North Dakota
5	Michigan State
6	Providence
7	Wisconsin
8	Minnesota Duluth
9	Boston University
10	Ohio State

== Regular season ==
=== Season tournaments ===
Tournament	Dates	Teams	Champion
Battle Creek Tournament	October 14–15	4	Western Michigan
RIT Invitational	November 4–5	4	Wilfrid Laurier
Empire Cup	November 25–26	4	Rensselaer
Minnesota–Duluth Holiday Classic	December 28–30	4	Boston College
Great Lakes Invitational	December 29–30	4	Michigan State
KeyBank Tournament	December 29–30	4	Bowling Green
Syracuse Invitational	December 29–30	4	Colgate
Auld Lang Syne Classic	December 30–31	4	New Hampshire
Rensselaer Holiday Tournament	December 30–31	4	Rensselaer
First Interstate Classic	January 5–8	8	North Dakota
Phoenix Mutual Classic	January 6–7	4	Colgate
Beanpot	February 6, 13	4	Northeastern

=== Standings ===
1983–84 Central Collegiate Hockey Association standings
	Conference							Overall					
	GP	W	L	T	PTS	GF	GA	GP	W	L	T	GF	GA
Bowling Green†	28	22	4	2	.821	146	95	44	34	8	2	228	146
Ohio State	30	21	9	0	.700	155	96	41	30	10	1	212	133
Michigan State*	30	21	9	0	.700	162	90	46	34	12	0	241	129
Northern Michigan	30	16	14	0	.533	126	118	40	17	22	1	155	161
Western Michigan	28	13	14	1	.482	125	114	42	22	18	2	187	168
Michigan Tech	30	14	16	0	.467	123	128	41	19	21	1	160	167
Ferris State	30	13	15	2	.467	128	138	41	18	20	3	184	184
Lake Superior State	30	12	17	1	.417	103	127	40	18	20	2	152	176
Michigan	30	11	18	1	.383	105	148	37	14	22	1	134	179
Miami	30	10	20	0	.333	116	156	37	13	23	1	149	188
Illinois-Chicago	28	5	22	1	.196	83	162	35	5	29	1	106	221
Championship: Michigan State † indicates conference regular season champion * indicates conference tournament champion

1983–84 ECAC Hockey standings
	Conference							Overall					
	GP	W	L	T	Pct.	GF	GA	GP	W	L	T	GF	GA
East Region
Boston College	21	15	6	0	.714	88	72	39	26	13	0	175	141
Boston University	21	15	6	0	.714	75	63	40	28	11	1	167	120
New Hampshire	21	13	8	0	.619	94	73	38	20	17	1	169	139
Providence	21	12	7	2	.619	84	78	35	21	12	2	143	122
Northeastern	21	10	10	1	.500	104	97	29	16	12	1	144	124
Maine	21	7	14	0	.333	75	109	34	14	20	0	130	161
West Region
Rensselaer†*	20	17	3	0	.850	117	53	38	32	6	0	218	113
Clarkson	20	14	6	0	.700	97	63	34	21	11	2	156	110
Colgate	20	10	9	1	.525	83	89	35	20	14	1	171	149
St. Lawrence	20	10	10	0	.500	108	80	32	19	13	0	175	126
Vermont	20	6	13	1	.325	89	97	29	10	18	1	127	132
Ivy Region
Harvard	21	10	9	1	.524	68	61	27	10	14	3	84	90
Yale	21	10	10	1	.500	76	73	26	12	13	1	91	92
Cornell	21	9	12	0	.429	83	94	26	11	15	0	106	113
Brown	21	5	15	1	.262	59	109	26	6	19	1	70	135
Princeton	21	5	15	1	.262	81	103	25	6	18	1	101	126
Dartmouth	21	3	18	0	.143	58	119	26	3	23	0	71	148
Independent
Army^	-	-	-	-	-	-	-	34	28	5	1	241	104
Lowell^	-	-	-	-	-	-	-	34	15	16	3	138	164
Championship: Rensselaer † indicates conference regular season champion * indicates conference tournament champion^ Both Army and Lowell had been accepted into ECAC Hockey but had not begun a conference schedule

1983–84 NCAA Division I Independent ice hockey standings
	Conference							Overall					
	GP	W	L	T	PTS	GF	GA	GP	W	L	T	GF	GA
Air Force	0	0	0	0	-	-	-	26	8	16	2	109	131
Kent State	0	0	0	0	-	-	-	27	16	11	0		
Northern Arizona	0	0	0	0	-	-	-	27	21	6	0	172	97
US International	0	0	0	0	-	-	-	36	4	31	1		

1983–84 Western Collegiate Hockey Association standings
	Conference							Overall					
	GP	W	L	T	PTS	GF	GA	GP	W	L	T	GF	GA
Minnesota-Duluth†*	26	19	5	2	40	138	85	43	29	12	2	216	140
North Dakota	26	16	8	2	34	117	82	45	31	12	2	204	145
Minnesota	26	16	9	1	33	106	97	40	27	11	2	190	154
Wisconsin	26	11	14	1	23	105	107	39	21	17	1	182	168
Denver	26	8	18	0	16	119	152	39	14	25	0	182	203
Colorado College	26	5	21	0	10	77	139	35	9	25	1	109	168
Championship: Minnesota-Duluth † indicates conference regular season champion * indicates conference tournament champion

=== Final regular season polls ===
The final top 10 teams as ranked by coaches (WMPL) before the conference tournament finals.

The final media poll (CHSB/WDOM) was released after the conference tournament finals.

WMPL Coaches Poll
Ranking	Team
1	Minnesota Duluth (10)
2	Rensselaer
3	Bowling Green
4	Boston University
5	Minnesota (10)
6	Michigan State
7	North Dakota
8	Ohio State
9	Boston College
10	Clarkson

CHSB / WDOM Media Poll
Ranking	Team
1	Minnesota Duluth (6)
2	Rensselaer (3)
3	Michigan State (1)
4	Bowling Green
5	Boston University
6	North Dakota
7	Boston College
8	Ohio State
9	Clarkson
10	Western Michigan

== 1984 NCAA Tournament ==
Quarterfinals; March 16–18
E1	Rensselaer	4	2	6
W4	North Dakota	5	4	9
W2	Minnesota–Duluth	6	3	9
E3	Clarkson	2	6	8
W1	Michigan State	6	7	13
E4	Boston College	2	6	8
E2	Boston University	6	1	7
W3	Bowling Green	3	5***	8

Semifinals; March 22–23
W4	North Dakota	1
W2	Minnesota–Duluth	2*
W1	Michigan State	1
W3	Bowling Green	2

National championship March 24
W2	Minnesota–Duluth	4
W3	Bowling Green	5****
Third-place game
W1	Michigan State	5
W4	North Dakota	6*

Note: * denotes overtime period(s)

== Player stats ==
=== Scoring leaders ===
The following players led the league in points at the conclusion of the season.

GP = Games played; G = Goals; A = Assists; Pts = Points; PIM = Penalty minutes

Player	Class	Team	GP	G	A	Pts	PIM
Paul Pooley	Senior	Ohio State	42	32	64	96	38
Dan Dorion	Sophomore	Western Michigan	42	41	50	91	42
Bill Watson	Sophomore	Minnesota−Duluth	40	35	51	86	12
Adam Oates	Sophomore	Rensselaer	38	26	57	83	15
Mike Symes	Junior	Army	32	38	45	82	-
Perry Pooley	Senior	Ohio State	41	39	40	79	28
Tom Kurvers	Senior	Minnesota−Duluth	43	18	58	76	46
John Carter	Sophomore	Rensselaer	38	35	39	74	52
Biff Shea	Junior	Army	34	29	45	74	-
Greg Adams	Sophomore	Northern Arizona	26	44	29	73	24
Randy Merrifield	Senior	Ferris State	41	20	53	73	14

=== Leading goaltenders ===
The following goaltenders led the league in goals against average at the end of the regular season while playing at least 33% of their team's total minutes.

GP = Games played; Min = Minutes played; W = Wins; L = Losses; OT = Overtime/shootout losses; GA = Goals against; SO = Shutouts; SV% = Save percentage; GAA = Goals against average

Player	Class	Team	GP	Min	W	L	OT	GA	SO	SV%	GAA
Norm Foster	Freshman	Michigan State	32	1815	23	8	0	83	1	.898	2.74
Bob Essensa	Freshman	Michigan State	17	946	11	4	0	44	2	.891	2.79
John Dougan	Junior	Ohio State	27	1495	18	-	-	71	-	.897	2.85
Gary Kruzich	Freshman	Bowling Green	28	-	21	5	2	-	-	.896	2.87
Brian Jopling	Freshman	Rensselaer	15	457	8	0	0	22	0	.882	2.89
Mike Schwalb	Freshman	Yale	-	-	-	-	-	-	-	.899	2.91
Cleon Daskalakis	Senior	Boston University	35	1972	25	10	0	96	1	.911	2.92
Daren Puppa	Freshman	Rensselaer	32	1816	24	6	0	89	0	.900	2.94
Ron Benton	Senior	Alaska−Anchorage	-	973	13	-	-	48	1	.897	2.96
Rick Kosti	Freshman	Minnesota−Duluth	38	2347	27	9	2	119	0	.898	3.04

== Awards ==
=== NCAA ===
Award		Recipient
Hobey Baker Memorial Award		Tom Kurvers, Minnesota–Duluth
Spencer Penrose Award		Mike Sertich, Minnesota–Duluth
Most Outstanding Player in NCAA Tournament		Gary Kruzich, Bowling Green
AHCA All-American Teams
East First Team	Position	West First Team
Cleon Daskalakis, Boston University	G	Jon Casey, North Dakota
Bob Armstrong, Clarkson	D	Garry Galley, Bowling Green
Dave Fretz, Clarkson	D	Tom Kurvers, Minnesota-Duluth
John Carter, Rensselaer	F	Dan Kane, Bowling Green
Adam Oates, Rensselaer	F	Paul Pooley, Ohio State
Steve Smith, Colgate	F	Bill Watson, Minnesota-Duluth
East Second Team	Position	West Second Team
Daren Puppa, Rensselaer	G	Rick Kosti, Minnesota-Duluth
Peter Taglianetti, Providence	D	Dan McFall, Michigan State
T. J. Connolly, Boston University	D	Bill Schafhauser, Northern Michigan
Kevin Foster, Vermont	F	Perry Pooley, Ohio State
Ken Manchurek, Northeastern	F	Dan Dorion, Western Michigan
Gates Orlando, Providence	F	Bob Lakso, Minnesota-Duluth

=== CCHA ===
Awards		Recipient
Player of the Year		Paul Pooley, Ohio State
Rookie of the Year		Gary Emmons, Northern Michigan
		Bill Shibicky, Michigan State
Coach of the Year		Bill Wilkinson, Western Michigan
Most Valuable Player in Tournament		Glenn Healy, Western Michigan
All-CCHA Teams
First Team	Position	Second Team
John Dougan, Ohio State	G	Norm Foster, Michigan State
Garry Galley, Bowling Green	D	Dave Ellett, Bowling Green
Dan McFall, Michigan State	D	Jim File, Ferris State
Paul Pooley, Ohio State	F	Perry Pooley, Ohio State
Dan Dorion, Western Michigan	F	Randy Merrifield, Ferris State
Dan Kane, Bowling Green	F	John Samanski, Bowling Green

=== ECAC ===
Award		Recipient
Player of the Year		Cleon Daskalakis, Boston University
Rookie of the Year		John Cullen, Boston University
Most Outstanding Player in Tournament		Adam Oates, Rensselaer
All-ECAC Hockey Teams
First Team	Position	Second Team
Cleon Daskalakis, Boston University	G	Bruce Gillies, New Hampshire
Jim Chisholm, Boston College	D	Peter Taglianetti, Providence
T. J. Connolly, Boston University	D	Brian Byrnes, New Hampshire
Bob Armstrong, Clarkson	D	
Gates Orlando, Providence	F	Adam Oates, Rensselaer
Steve Smith, Colgate	F	John Carter, Rensselaer
Kevin Foster, Vermont	F	Marty Dallman, Rensselaer

=== WCHA ===
Award		Recipient
Most Valuable Player		Tom Kurvers, Minnesota-Duluth
Freshman of the Year		Rick Kosti, Minnesota-Duluth
Coach of the Year		Mike Sertich, Minnesota-Duluth
All-WCHA Teams
First Team	Position	Second Team
Jon Casey, North Dakota	G	Rick Kosti, Minnesota-Duluth
Tom Kurvers, Minnesota-Duluth	D	Tony Kellin, Minnesota
Jim Leavins, Denver	D	Rick Zombo, North Dakota
	D	Norm Maciver, Minnesota-Duluth
Bill Watson, Minnesota-Duluth	F	Tom Herzig, Minnesota-Duluth
Dan Brennan, North Dakota	F	Bob Lakso, Minnesota-Duluth
Tom Rothstein, Minnesota	F	Matt Christensen, Minnesota-Duluth

== 1984 NHL entry draft ==
Round	Pick	Player	College	Conference	NHL team
1	6	Craig Redmond	Denver	WCHA	Los Angeles Kings
1	13	David Quinn ^{†}	Boston University	ECAC Hockey	Minnesota North Stars
2	27	Scott Mellanby ^{†}	Wisconsin	WCHA	Philadelphia Flyers
2	30	Peter Douris	New Hampshire	ECAC Hockey	Winnipeg Jets
2	32	Tony Hrkac ^{†}	North Dakota	WCHA	St. Louis Blues
2	34	Steve Leach ^{†}	New Hampshire	ECAC Hockey	Washington Capitals
2	38	Paul Ranheim ^{†}	Wisconsin	WCHA	Calgary Flames
3	44	Neil Davey	Michigan State	CCHA	New Jersey Devils
3	46	Ken Hodge Jr. ^{†}	Boston College	ECAC Hockey	Minnesota North Stars
3	50	Toby Ducolon ^{†}	Vermont	ECAC Hockey	St. Louis Blues
3	52	David Saunders	St. Lawrence	ECAC Hockey	Vancouver Canucks
3	62	Jeff Norton ^{†}	Michigan	CCHA	New York Islanders
3	63	Todd Norman ^{†}	North Dakota	WCHA	Edmonton Oilers
4	65	Lee Brodeur ^{†}	North Dakota	WCHA	Montreal Canadiens
4	68	Chris Mills ^{†}	Clarkson	ECAC Hockey	Winnipeg Jets
4	70	Doug Wieck ^{†}	Colorado College	WCHA	New York Islanders
4	72	Sean Clement ^{†}	Michigan State	CCHA	Winnipeg Jets
4	74	Paul Ysebaert ^{†}	Bowling Green	CCHA	New Jersey Devils
4	77	Paul Broten ^{†}	Minnesota	WCHA	New York Rangers
4	79	Dave Hanson ^{†}	Denver	WCHA	Philadelphia Flyers
4	82	Bob Joyce ^{†}	North Dakota	WCHA	Boston Bruins
4	84	Richard Novak ^{†}	Michigan Tech	CCHA	Edmonton Oilers
5	86	Jon Morris ^{†}	Lowell	ECAC Hockey	New Jersey Devils
5	87	David Grannis ^{†}	Minnesota	WCHA	Los Angeles Kings
5	88	Jack Capuano ^{†}	Maine	ECAC Hockey	Toronto Maple Leafs
5	92	Scott Paluch ^{†}	Bowling Green	CCHA	St. Louis Blues
5	93	Scott Schneider	Colorado College	WCHA	Winnipeg Jets
5	95	Gerry Johannson ^{†}	Lake Superior State	CCHA	Montreal Canadiens
5	98	Clark Donatelli ^{†}	Boston University	ECAC Hockey	New York Rangers
5	105	Rick Lambert ^{†}	New Hampshire	ECAC Hockey	Edmonton Oilers
6	108	Greg Strome	North Dakota	WCHA	Los Angeles Kings
6	113	Steve Tuttle ^{†}	Wisconsin	WCHA	St. Louis Blues
6	114	Gary Lorden ^{†}	Michigan	CCHA	Winnipeg Jets
6	115	Jeff Korchinski	Clarkson	ECAC Hockey	Vancouver Canucks
6	117	Brett Hull ^{†}	Minnesota–Duluth	WCHA	Calgary Flames
6	124	Randy Oswald	Michigan Tech	CCHA	Boston Bruins
6	125	Jim Wilharm ^{†}	United States International	Independent	New York Islanders
7	127	Tom Ryan ^{†}	Boston University	ECAC Hockey	Pittsburgh Penguins
7	129	Tim Hanley ^{†}	New Hampshire	ECAC Hockey	Los Angeles Kings
7	130	Joe MacInnis ^{†}	Northeastern	ECAC Hockey	Toronto Maple Leafs
7	135	Luciano Borsato ^{†}	Clarkson	ECAC Hockey	Winnipeg Jets
7	138	Kevan Melrose ^{†}	Harvard	ECAC Hockey	Calgary Flames
7	140	Tom Hussey ^{†}	Rensselaer	ECAC Hockey	New York Rangers
7	146	Kelly Murphy ^{†}	Michigan Tech	CCHA	New York Islanders
8	148	Don Porter	Michigan Tech	CCHA	St. Louis Blues
8	150	Shannon Deegan	Vermont	ECAC Hockey	Los Angeles Kings
8	156	Brad Jones	Michigan	CCHA	Winnipeg Jets
8	158	Brad McCaughey ^{†}	Michigan	CCHA	Montreal Canadiens
8	160	Darin McInnis ^{†}	Cornell	ECAC Hockey	Minnesota North Stars
8	161	Brian Nelson ^{†}	Minnesota–Duluth	WCHA	New York Rangers
8	162	Jyrki Maki ^{†}	Lowell	ECAC Hockey	Quebec Nordiques
8	163	Luke Vitale ^{†}	Providence	ECAC Hockey	Philadelphia Flyers
8	166	Don Sweeney ^{†}	Harvard	ECAC Hockey	Boston Bruins
9	170	Mike Roth ^{†}	New Hampshire	ECAC Hockey	New Jersey Devils
9	173	John Devereaux ^{†}	Boston College	ECAC Hockey	Hartford Whalers
9	175	Bill Shibicky	Michigan State	CCHA	Detroit Red Wings
9	177	Gord Whitaker	Colorado College	WCHA	Winnipeg Jets
9	180	Gary Suter	Wisconsin	WCHA	Calgary Flames
9	181	Dewey Wahlin ^{†}	Maine	ECAC Hockey	Minnesota North Stars
9	182	Ville Kentala ^{†}	Boston University	ECAC Hockey	New York Rangers
9	184	Billy Powers ^{†}	Michigan	CCHA	Philadelphia Flyers
9	186	Kevin Heffernan ^{†}	Northeastern	ECAC Hockey	Boston Bruins
10	189	Steve Hurt ^{†}	Lake Superior State	CCHA	Pittsburgh Penguins
10	190	Mike Peluso ^{†}	Alaska–Anchorage	Independent	New Jersey Devils
10	191	Jeff Crossman	Western Michigan	CCHA	Los Angeles Kings
10	192	David Buckley ^{†}	Boston College	ECAC Hockey	Toronto Maple Leafs
10	193	Brent Regan	Bowling Green	CCHA	Hartford Whalers
10	195	Jay Rose ^{†}	Clarkson	ECAC Hockey	Detroit Red Wings
10	196	Tom Tilley ^{†}	Michigan State	CCHA	St. Louis Blues
10	197	Rick Forst ^{†}	North Dakota	WCHA	Winnipeg Jets
10	198	Ed Lowney	Boston University	ECAC Hockey	Vancouver Canucks
10	201	Mike Orn ^{†}	Miami	CCHA	Minnesota North Stars
10	202	Kevin Miller ^{†}	Michigan State	CCHA	New York Rangers
10	204	Daryn Fersovich	Bowling Green	CCHA	Philadelphia Flyers
10	205	Paul Cavallini ^{†}	Providence	ECAC Hockey	Washington Capitals
11	210	Jim Steen ^{†}	North Dakota	WCHA	Pittsburgh Penguins
11	213	Mike Wurst	Ohio State	CCHA	Toronto Maple Leafs
11	214	Jim Culhane	Western Michigan	CCHA	Hartford Whalers
11	218	Mike Warus	Lake Superior State	CCHA	Winnipeg Jets
11	219	Doug Clarke	Colorado College	WCHA	Vancouver Canucks
11	220	David Tanner ^{†}	Yale	ECAC Hockey	Montreal Canadiens
11	222	Tom Terwilliger ^{†}	Miami	CCHA	Minnesota North Stars
11	223	Tom Lorentz ^{†}	Minnesota–Duluth	WCHA	New York Rangers
11	227	Bill Kopecky ^{†}	Boston College	ECAC Hockey	Boston Bruins
11	228	Russ Becker ^{†}	Michigan Tech	CCHA	New York Islanders
12	237	Mark Lanigan ^{†}	Northern Michigan	CCHA	St. Louis Blues
12	238	Jim Edmands	Cornell	ECAC Hockey	Winnipeg Jets
12	242	Mike Nightengale ^{†}	Ohio State	CCHA	Minnesota North Stars
12	243	Scott Brower ^{†}	North Dakota	WCHA	New York Rangers
12	247	Sean Baker ^{†}	Michigan	CCHA	Buffalo Sabres
12	248	Jim Newhouse ^{†}	Lowell	ECAC Hockey	Boston Bruins
12	249	Allister Brown	New Hampshire	ECAC Hockey	New York Islanders

† incoming freshman

== See also ==
- 1983–84 NCAA Division II men's ice hockey season
- 1983–84 NCAA Division III men's ice hockey season
