= 1984–85 RPI Engineers men's ice hockey season =

Rensselaer Polytechnic Institute's 1984-85 ice hockey team

National champion Rensselaer Holiday Tournament, champion ECAC Hockey, champion ECAC Hockey tournament, champion NCAA tournament, champion
- Conference: 1st ECAC Hockey
- Home ice: Houston Field House

Record
- Overall: 35–2–1
- Conference: 20–1–0
- Home: 18–1–1
- Road: 13–1–0
- Neutral: 4–0–0

Coaches and captains
- Head coach: Mike Addesa
- Captain: Mike Sadeghpour

The 1984–85 RPI Engineers men's ice hockey team represented the Rensselaer Polytechnic Institute in college ice hockey. In its 6th year under head coach Mike Addesa the team compiled a 35–2–1 record and reached the NCAA tournament for the sixth time. The Engineers defeated Providence 2–1 to win the championship game at the Joe Louis Arena in Detroit, Michigan.

== Season ==
=== New ECAC ===
After a year in which Rensselaer set a new program record with 32 wins and reached the NCAA tournament for the first time in 20 years, RPI found themselves scrambling to adjust their schedule. All Six teams from the East Region of ECAC Hockey, along with newly admitted Lowell, broke away to form a new conference. While many of the higher-profile programs left, the reduction to 12 teams allowed the remaining ECAC members to play an even schedule for the first time in league history; all teams played one another twice, once at home and one on the road, except for Army who only played other ECAC members once. As part of the new scheduling arrangement, Rensselaer was paired with Vermont and the two teams would travel at the same time to visit the same region. For example, RPI's first conference road game was against Yale in Connecticut while at the same time Vermont played Brown in Rhode Island. The next night Rensselaer and Vermont swapped opponents which allowed all teams to reduce travel time while still fulfilling their new scheduling guidelines.

=== Early season hiccup ===
The Engineers began the season with two strong home wins against Canadian teams but then immediately stumbled against St. Lawrence in their conference opener. The team recovered with a win over Clarkson the following night then hit the road for a set of games against North Dakota. RPI returned to the northeast after another weekend split and was able to finally win a weekend after getting a tough fight from Brown. Rensselaer ended the first part of their season with a fairly easy pair of games where they seemed to find the consistency that had served them well the year before.

=== Holiday Tournament ===
For the 34th annual Rensselaer Holiday Tournament, RPI dominated Miami in the semifinal before facing their third Canadian team of the season and managed to down Toronto in the final to take their third consecutive tournament title. When the team returned to its regular schedule the following weekend they fought a series of close games, including a surprising strong effort from Division III Union, but RPI escaped an embarrassing fate to raise their record to 13–2.

=== ECAC dominance ===
After that scare the Engineers didn't have another close game for almost two months, winning every game by at least 3 goals until their final game of the regular season, a 5–4 win over Cornell. After opening their conference schedule with a loss Rensselaer had won its final 20 conference games, the second best streak and the second most wins in conference history (both behind only 1970 Cornell) and the third highest winning percentage in ECAC history. Leading the way for the conference's top offense was junior center Adam Oates who had already set a new program record with 83 points the previous season and was well on his way to improving on the mark. RPI also possessed the #2 defense in the country, allowing only 54 goals in 21 conference games and were backstopped by Buffalo Sabres draft pick Daren Puppa.

=== ECAC tournament ===
Searching for their second consecutive ECAC crown, Rensselaer ran through Princeton in the quarterfinal series and then headed to Boston where Puppa stifled the opposition, allowing only one goal in each of the final two games which the Engineers ended triumphantly. Puppa was named as tournament MOP and with their 32–2 record Rensselaer received the #1 eastern seed to go along with their automatic tournament berth.

=== NCAA tournament ===
With the higher seed, Rensselaer played host to Lake Superior State in the Quarterfinals and opened by setting a new franchise record, with their 33rd win of the season, taking the contest 7–3. Because the Quarterfinal series was a total goal affair RPI would advance so long as could keep the second game close and a 3-3 tie was well within their margin for error. Because the Lakers could not win the series regardless of an overtime result no extra time was played and the game ended after regulation along with RPI's 30-game winning streak.

Rensselear headed to Detroit for the Frozen Four and met the previous season's runner-up, Minnesota–Duluth. In what became one of the more memorable games RPI and Duluth began fighting one another almost from the drop of the puck; the two teams got into a scrape then ended up with double matching minors and both teams played 3-on-3. during that time the Engineers opened the scoring with Tim Friday's fifth goal of the season. Afterwards RPI got into trouble with two consecutive penalties to give UMD a 5-on-3 advantage but their defense was able to hold the fort and prevent the Bulldogs from evening the score.

In the second period Mark Baron scored twice in 30 seconds to give the Bulldogs their first lead of the game. John Carter tied the game with a power play goal off a rebound before George Servinis gave the lead back to Rensselaer. The game was then tied for the fourth time when Brett Hull scored a breakaway goal and the two teams headed into intermission.

In the third, while killing a penalty, Servinis found himself on a partial breakaway but the puck got too far in front of him. Duluth goalie Rick Kosti charged out of the net to knock the puck away but Servinis reached it first and deflected the puck just enough for Kosti to miss it with his stick. Kosti's momentum carried him into Servinis but the RPI forward was able to stay on his skates, the same could not be said for Duluth defender Jim Johnson who went tumbling head over heels into the boards and allowed Servinis to shoot the puck into the vacated net. Duluth tied the game again when 1985 Hobey Baker Award winner Bill Watson shot his own rebound in behind Puppa. UMD's second lead of the game came from a Bob Herzig shot in the high slot that went under Puppa's glove. With regulation winding down and their chances dwindling, RPI fought to keep the puck alive in the Duluth end and, after a pass from behind the net, the puck pinballed off a Duluth skate right to Ken Hammond who slid the puck into the net.

The two teams continued to battle for the first two 10-minute overtimes but at the end of the second tempers flared and the teams ended up with a slew of penalties. The third overtime period began 3-on-3 and after two minutes the teams played 4-on-4, but because Duluth had taken one additional penalty, the Engineers found themselves on a power play from a penalty that had happened 4 minutes earlier. The Bulldogs were able to survive most of the disadvantage but with only 15 seconds left in the penalty Carter fired a shot from the point that deflected off a Duluth stick and into the net, ending the game that saw RPI setting a new Frozen Four record with 16 penalties (followed closely by Duluth's 14).

==== Championship ====
Rensselaer made their first championship appearance in 31 years with only Providence standing in their way. The Friars were coming off their own triple overtime victory in the semifinal but had an extra day to recover from the exertion. The extra playing time didn't seem to faze the Engineers, however, as RPI opened the scoring with a power play goal less than 5 minutes into the game. Rensselaer dominated the play but couldn't get the puck past Chris Terreri on any of their other 13 shots of the period and had to settle for a 1–0 lead after 20 minutes. It was more of the same in the second period but, after giving Providence a brief 5-on-3 advantage, George Servinis scored his second short-handed goal of the Frozen Four at the tail-end of the second penalty to give the Engineers a two-goal cushion. After that Terreri stood on his head and turned aside every RPI shot that came his way. Even with a 2–0 lead Rensselaer looked to be overpowering the Friars, leading in the shot total 31 to 12 after 40 minutes. Providence responded in the third, firing 10 shots at Puppa with Paul Cavallini finding the twine on the power play, but it was too little too late and when the final horn sounded RPI had won their second national title.

=== Awards and honors ===
Unsurprisingly Chris Terreri was given the tournament MOP, the last player to do so who did not play for the championship team, but four Engineers did make the All-Tournament team: Tim Friday, Ken Hammond, Adam Oates and George Servinis. Oates finished the season third in the nation in scoring with 91 points and first in points per game (2.39), narrowly outpacing Bill Watson's 2.36 ppg mark. Oates' scoring prowess earned him a spot on the AHCA All-American East First Team along with Hammond while John Carter made the Second Team. All three made the All-ECAC First Team while Daren Puppa, despite finishing second in the nation with 30 wins and third with a 2.56 goals against average received no further mention beyond tournament MOP.

== Standings ==
1984–85 ECAC Hockey standings
	Conference							Overall					
	GP	W	L	T	PTS	GF	GA	GP	W	L	T	GF	GA
Rensselaer†*	21	20	1	0	40	139	54	38	35	2	1	245	100
Harvard	21	15	5	1	31	99	58	32	21	9	2	147	96
Clarkson	21	15	6	0	30	87	59	34	21	10	3	143	104
Cornell	21	14	6	1	29	101	78	30	18	10	2	145	115
Yale	21	13	7	1	27	93	78	31	19	11	1	148	122
St. Lawrence	21	12	9	0	24	75	70	32	17	13	2	122	122
Colgate	21	9	12	0	18	75	77	32	14	18	0	122	122
Princeton	21	7	12	2	16	58	74	28	12	14	2	96	105
Brown	21	6	15	0	12	59	81	26	9	17	0	76	102
Vermont	21	4	17	0	8	46	97	29	8	21	0	75	128
Dartmouth	21	3	17	1	7	49	122	24	5	18	1	63	139
Army^	11	0	11	0	0	29	60	30	17	13	0	150	121
Championship: Rensselaer † indicates conference regular season champion * indicates conference tournament champion^ Army played a half schedule

== Schedule ==
Date	Opponent^{#}	Rank^{#}	Site	Result	Record
Regular season
November 3	vs. Guelph*		Houston Field House • Troy, New York	W 13–6	1–0
November 10	vs. Concordia*		Houston Field House • Troy, New York	W 9–3	2–0
November 16	vs. St. Lawrence		Houston Field House • Troy, New York	L 3–5	2–1 (0–1)
November 17	vs. Clarkson		Houston Field House • Troy, New York	W 5–3	3–1 (1–1)
November 23	at North Dakota*		Winter Sports Building • Grand Forks, North Dakota	L 6–7 ^{OT}	3–2 (1–1)
November 24	at North Dakota*		Winter Sports Building • Grand Forks, North Dakota	W 8–2	4–2 (1–1)
November 30	at Yale		Ingalls Rink • New Haven, Connecticut	W 7–3	5–2 (2–1)
December 1	at Brown		Meehan Auditorium • Providence, Rhode Island	W 4–3 ^{OT}	6–2 (3–1)
December 7	vs. Army		Houston Field House • Troy, New York	W 8–0	7–2 (4–1)
December 8	vs. Princeton		Houston Field House • Troy, New York	W 12–4	8–2 (5–1)
Rensselaer Holiday Tournament
December 28	vs. Miami*		Houston Field House • Troy, New York (Tournament Semifinal)	W 9–1	9–2 (5–1)
December 29	vs. Toronto*		Houston Field House • Troy, New York (Tournament championship)	W 4–2	10–2 (5–1)
January 4	at Harvard		Bright-Landry Hockey Center • Boston, Massachusetts	W 5–4	11–2 (6–1)
January 5	at Dartmouth		Thompson Arena • Hanover, New Hampshire	W 5–2	12–2 (7–1)
January 8	at Union*		Achilles Rink • Schenectady, New York	W 3–2 ^{OT}	13–2 (7–1)
January 11	vs. Cornell		Houston Field House • Troy, New York	W 6–2	14–2 (8–1)
January 12	vs. Colgate		Houston Field House • Troy, New York	W 6–0	15–2 (9–1)
January 18	vs. Michigan*		Houston Field House • Troy, New York	W 5–2	16–2 (9–1)
January 19	vs. Michigan*		Houston Field House • Troy, New York	W 5–1	17–2 (9–1)
January 25	at Vermont		Gutterson Fieldhouse • Burlington, Vermont	W 7–3	18–2 (10–1)
January 26	vs. Vermont		Houston Field House • Troy, New York	W 8–2	19–2 (11–1)
February 1	at Clarkson		Walker Arena • Potsdam, New York	W 7–4	20–2 (12–1)
February 2	at St. Lawrence		Appleton Arena • Canton, New York	W 7–4	21–2 (13–1)
February 8	vs. Brown		Houston Field House • Troy, New York	W 7–2	22–2 (14–1)
February 9	vs. Yale		Houston Field House • Troy, New York	W 8–2	23–2 (15–1)
February 15	at Princeton		Hobey Baker Memorial Rink • Princeton, New Jersey	W 6–3	24–2 (16–1)
February 22	at Dartmouth		Houston Field House • Troy, New York	W 11–1	25–2 (17–1)
February 23	at Harvard		Houston Field House • Troy, New York	W 4–1	26–2 (18–1)
March 1	at Colgate		Starr Rink • Hamilton, New York	W 8–2	27–2 (19–1)
March 2	at Cornell		Lynah Rink • Ithaca, New York	W 5–4	28–2 (20–1)
ECAC tournament
March 8	vs. Princeton*		Houston Field House • Troy, New York (ECAC Quarterfinal game 1)	W 7–2	29–2 (20–1)
March 9	vs. Princeton*		Houston Field House • Troy, New York (ECAC Quarterfinal game 2)	W 11–4	30–2 (20–1)
Rensselaer Wins Series 2-0
March 9	vs. Cornell*		Boston Garden • Boston, Massachusetts (ECAC Semifinal)	W 5–1	31–2 (20–1)
March 10	vs. Harvard*		Boston Garden • Boston, Massachusetts (ECAC championship)	W 3–1	32–2 (20–1)
NCAA tournament
March 16	vs. Lake Superior State*		Houston Field House • Troy, New York (National Quarterfinal game 1)	W 7–3	33–2 (20–1)
March 17	vs. Lake Superior State*		Houston Field House • Troy, New York (National Quarterfinal game 2)	T 3–3	33–2–1 (20–1)
Rensselaer Wins Series 10-6
March 23	vs. Minnesota–Duluth*		Joe Louis Arena • Detroit, Michigan (National Semifinal)	W 6–5 ^{3OT}	34–2–1 (20–1)
March 24	vs. Providence*		Joe Louis Arena • Detroit, Michigan (National championship)	W 2–1	35–2–1 (20–1)
*Non-conference game. ^{#}Rankings from USCHO.com Poll. Source:

== Roster and scoring statistics ==
No.	Name	Year	Position	Hometown	S/P/C	Games	Goals	Assists	Pts	PIM
12	Adam Oates	Junior	C	Weston, ON	(Ontario)	38	31	60	91	29
15	John Carter	Junior	LW	Winchester, MA	(Massachusetts)	37	43	29	72	52
7	Mark Jooris	Junior	F	Burlington, ON	(Ontario)	35	23	37	60	22
9	George Servinis	Junior	LW	Toronto, ON	(Ontario)	35	34	25	59	44
16	Bob DiPronio	Sophomore	F	Waltham, MA	(Massachusetts)	37	13	26	39	38
26	Ken Hammond	Senior	D	London, ON	(Ontario)	38	11	28	39	90
17	Neil Hernberg	Sophomore	F	Hingham, MA	(Massachusetts)	38	18	17	35	22
2	Tim Friday	Senior	D	Burbank, CA	(California)	36	5	29	34	26
22	Mike Dark	Junior	D	Sarnia, ON	(Ontario)	36	7	26	33	76
8	John Tiano	Junior	F	Winthrop, MA	(Massachusetts)	36	13	16	29	28
14	Terry Butryn	Sophomore	F	Beamsville, ON	(Ontario)	38	12	15	27	30
21	Mike Sadeghpour	Senior	F	Lexington, MA	(Massachusetts)	26	5	16	21	21
11	Kraig Nienhuis	Junior	LW	Sarnia, ON	(Ontario)	36	11	10	21	55
20	Trini Iturralde	Sophomore	LW	Revere, MA	(Massachusetts)	35	5	15	20	11
5	Mike Robinson	Sophomore	D	Boxborough, MA	(Massachusetts)	37	3	14	17	37
13	Maurice Mansi	Freshman	F	Montreal, PQ	(Quebec)	21	4	6	10	12
18	Rick Tosto	Freshman	F	Dearborn Heights, MI	(Michigan)	25	3	5	8	10
19	Tom Hussey	Freshman	F	Aurora, ON	(Ontario)	15	1	3	4	10
28	Jeff Prendergast	Junior	D	Toronto, ON	(Ontario)	30	1	3	4	10
4	Pierre Langevin	Senior	D	Saint-Leonard, PQ	(Quebec)	28	1	2	3	26
23	Mike Marcolin	Senior	D	Toronto, ON	(Ontario)	2	0	2	2	2
3	Jeff Whiteside	Senior	D	Rexdale, ON	(Ontario)	9	0	2	2	16
6	Marc Foland	Sophomore	D	Boxborough, MA	(Massachusetts)	13	1	1	2	2
30	Mike Poisson	Sophomore	G	Amesbury, MA	(Massachusetts)	5	0	0	0	0
31	Brian Jopling	Sophomore	G	Bridgewater, MA	(Massachusetts)	12	0	0	0	0
1	Daren Puppa	Sophomore	G	Kirkland Lake, ON	(Ontario)	32	0	0	0	2
	Bench					38				14
Total							245	387	632	685

== Goaltending statistics ==
No.	Name	Games	Minutes	Wins	Losses	Ties	Goals against	Saves	Shut outs	SV %	GAA
31	Brian Jopling	12	453	5	1	0	18	150	0	.893	2.38
1	Daren Puppa	32	1830	30	1	1	78	708	2	.901	2.56
30	Mike Poisson	5	26	0	0	0	4	13	0	.765	8.61
Total		38	2311	35	2	1	100	871	2	.897	2.60

== 1985 championship game ==
=== (E1) Rensselaer vs. (E4) Providence ===
March 30	Rensselaer	2 – 1	Providence	Joe Louis Arena

Scoring summary
Period	Team	Goal	Assist(s)	Time	Score
1st	RPI	Neil Hernberg – PP	DiPronio and Hammond	4:29	1–0 RPI
2nd	RPI	George Servinis – GW SH	unassisted	23:49	2–0 RPI
3rd	PC	Paul Cavallini – PP	Army and Rooney	50:00	2–1 RPI
Penalty summary
Period	Team	Player	Penalty	Time	PIM
1st	PC	Mike Brill	Cross-Checking	2:44	2:00
1st	RPI	Maurice Mansi	Tripping	7:23	2:00
1st	PC	Gord Cruickshank	Tripping	9:07	2:00
1st	RPI	Kraig Nienhuis	Unnecessary Roughness	11:10	2:00
1st	PC	Peter Taglianetti	Unnecessary Roughness	11:10	2:00
1st	PC	Gord Cruickshank	Holding	16:12	2:00
1st	PC	Peter Taglianetti	High–Sticking	18:30	2:00
2nd	RPI	Mark Jooris	Hooking	20:38	2:00
2nd	RPI	Mike Sadeghpour	Cross-Checking	22:06	2:00
2nd	PC	Nowel Catterall	Slashing	36:12	2:00
2nd	RPI	Ken Hammond	Holding	38:30	2:00
3rd	PC	Rene Boudreault	Slashing	42:12	2:00
3rd	PC	Nowel Catterall	Delay of Game	47:39	2:00
3rd	RPI	John Carter	Hooking	48:33	2:00

Shots by period
Team	1	2	3	T
Providence	8	4	10	22
Rensselaer	14	17	11	42

Goaltenders
Team	Name	Saves	Goals against	Time on ice
PC	Chris Terreri	40	2	
RPI	Daren Puppa	21	1	

== Players drafted into the NHL ==
=== 1985 NHL entry draft ===
= NHL All-Star team	= NHL All-Star	= NHL All-Star and NHL All-Star team	= Did not play in the NHL

Round	Pick	Player	NHL team
5	94	Steve Moore†	Boston Bruins
9	176	Rob Schena†	Detroit Red Wings
10	198	Maurice Mansi	Montreal Canadiens
12	251	John Haley†	Edmonton Oilers

† incoming freshman

Adam Oates, undrafted by his 22nd birthday, was able to sign a professional contract after forgoing his final year of eligibility. The $1.1 million deal he inked with Detroit was the most lucrative contract for a rookie at the time and the arms race for Oates' services led directly to the NHL instituting the Supplemental Draft. The secondary draft was used for players who were otherwise ineligible for the standard NHL entry draft.

== See also ==
- 1985 NCAA Division I Men's Ice Hockey Tournament
- List of NCAA Division I Men's Ice Hockey Tournament champions
