= RPI Engineers men's ice hockey statistical leaders =

The RPI Engineers men's ice hockey statistical leaders are individual statistical leaders of the RPI Engineers men's ice hockey program in various categories, including goals, assists, points, and saves. Within those areas, the lists identify single-game, single-season, and career leaders. The Engineers represent the Rensselaer Polytechnic Institute in the NCAA's ECAC Hockey.

RPI began competing in intercollegiate ice hockey in 1901. These lists are updated through the end of the 2020–21 season.

== Goals ==
Career
Rk	Player	Goals	Seasons
1	Frank Chiarelli	155	1951–52 1952–53 1953–54 1954–55
2	John Carter	117	1982–83 1983–84 1984–85 1985–86
3	Bob Brinkworth	110	1961–62 1962–63 1963–64
4	Abbie Moore	102	1951–52 1952–53 1953–54
5	Paul Midghall	93	1956–57 1957–58 1958–59
6	Jerry Knightley	90	1962–63 1963–64 1964–65
7	Mark Jooris	84	1982–83 1983–84 1984–85 1985–86
8	Pat Hahn	83	1973–74 1974–75 1975–76 1976–77
9	Marty Dallman	82	1980–81 1981–82 1982–83 1983–84
	Eric Healey	82	1994–95 1995–96 1996–97 1997–98

Season
Rk	Player	Goals	Season
1	Frank Chiarelli	55	1951–52
2	John Carter	43	1984–85
3	Bob Brinkworth	41	1961–62
4	Paul Midghall	40	1957–58
5	Ray Belasky	37	1958–59
6	Frank Chiarelli	36	1952–53
	Abbie Moore	36	1953–54
8	Abbie Moore	35	1952–53
	Frank Chiarelli	35	1953–54
	Bob Brinkworth	35	1963–64
	George Servinis	35	1982–83
	John Carter	35	1983–84

Single Game
Rk	Player	Goals	Season	Opponent
1	Richard Cook	7	1919–20	State College
	Frank Chiarelli	7	1951–52	Loyola
	Frank Chiarelli	7	1951–52	Champlain
	Dick Chiarelli	7	1955–56	Northeastern

== Assists ==
Career
Rk	Player	Assists	Seasons
1	Adam Oates	150	1982–83 1983–84 1984–85
2	Joe Juneau	144	1987–88 1988–89 1989–90 1990–91
3	Paul Midghall	118	1956–57 1957–58 1958–59
4	Bryan Richardson	113	1992–93 1993–94 1994–95 1995–96
5	Frank Chiarelli	110	1951–52 1952–53 1953–54 1954–55
6	John Carter	108	1982–83 1983–84 1984–85 1985–86
7	Bob Brinkworth	106	1961–62 1962–63 1963–64
	Craig Hamelin	106	1991–92 1992–93 1993–94 1994–95
9	Abbie Moore	104	1951–52 1952–53 1953–54
10	Alain St. Hilaire	103	1995–96 1996–97 1997–98 1998–99

Season
Rk	Player	Assists	Season
1	Adam Oates	60	1984–85
2	Adam Oates	57	1983–84
3	Joe Juneau	52	1989–90
4	Paul Midghall	49	1958–59
5	Dino Serra	46	1976–77
6	Jerry Knightley	42	1963–64
7	Bob Brinkworth	41	1962–63
8	Joe Juneau	40	1990–91
	Ron Pasco	40	1993–94
10	Jim Josephson	39	1961–62
	John Carter	39	1983–84

Single Game
Rk	Player	Assists	Season	Opponent
1	Gordie Peterkin	9	1952–53	Springfield

== Points ==
Career
Rk	Player	Points	Seasons
1	Frank Chiarelli	265	1951–52 1952–53 1953–54 1954–55
2	John Carter	225	1982–83 1983–84 1984–85 1985–86
3	Bob Brinkworth	216	1961–62 1962–63 1963–64
	Adam Oates	216	1982–83 1983–84 1984–85
5	Joe Juneau	213	1987–88 1988–89 1989–90 1990–91
6	Paul Midghall	211	1956–57 1957–58 1958–59
7	Abbie Moore	206	1951–52 1952–53 1953–54
8	Bryan Richardson	193	1992–93 1993–94 1994–95 1995–96
9	Jerry Knightley	187	1962–63 1963–64 1964–65
10	Mark Jooris	183	1982–83 1983–84 1984–85 1985–86

Season
Rk	Player	Points	Season
1	Adam Oates	91	1984–85
2	Adam Oates	83	1983–84
3	Frank Chiarelli	79	1951–52
4	Paul Midghall	78	1958–59
5	Bob Brinkworth	75	1962–63
	Jerry Knightley	75	1963–64
7	Paul Midghall	74	1957–58
	John Carter	74	1983–84
9	Abbie Moore	73	1952–53
10	John Carter	72	1984–85

Single Game
Rk	Player	Points	Season	Opponent
1	Gordie Peterkin	13	1952–53	Springfield

== Saves ==
Career
Rk	Player	Saves	Seasons
1	Nathan Marsters	3118	2000–01 2001–02 2002–03 2003–04
2	Neil Little	2930	1990–91 1991–92 1992–93 1993–94
3	Joel Laing	2881	1996–97 1997–98 1998–99 1999–00
4	Mathias Lange	2688	2005–06 2006–07 2007–08 2008–09
5	Don Cutts	2655	1971–72 1972–73 1973–74
6	Jason Kasdorf	2290	2012–13 2013–14 2014–15 2015–16
7	Allen York	2143	2008–09 2009–10 2010–11
8	Ian Harrison	2015	1976–77 1977–78 1978–79
9	Mike Tamburro	1993	1992–93 1993–94 1994–95 1995–96
10	Bill Sack	1952	1962–63 1963–64 1964–65

Season
Rk	Player	Saves	Season
1	Don Cutts	1064	1973–74
2	Mike Tamburro	975	1995–96
3	Don Cutts	957	1972–73
4	Scott Diebold	955	2013–14
5	Jason Kasdorf	916	2015–16
6	Dick Greenlaw	906	1965–66
7	Neil Little	903	1993–94

Single Game
Rk	Player	Saves	Season	Opponent
1	Dick Greenlaw	78	1965–66	Boston University
