= 1985 NCAA Division I men's ice hockey tournament =

- Teams: 8
- Finals site: Joe Louis Arena, Detroit, Michigan
- Champions: Rensselaer Engineers (2nd title)
- Runner-up: Providence Friars (1st title game)
- Semifinalists: Minnesota-Duluth Bulldogs (2nd Frozen Four); Boston College Eagles (12th Frozen Four)
- Winning coach: Mike Addesa (1st title)
- MOP: Chris Terreri (Providence)
- Attendance: 39,318

The 1985 NCAA Division I men's ice hockey tournament was the culmination of the 1984–85 NCAA Division I men's ice hockey season, the 38th such tournament in NCAA history. It was held between March 22 and 30, 1985, and concluded with Rensselaer defeating Providence 2-1. All Quarterfinals matchups were held at home team venues while all succeeding games were played at the Joe Louis Arena in Detroit, Michigan.

== Qualifying teams ==
The NCAA permitted 8 teams to qualify for the tournament and divided its qualifiers into two regions (East and West). Each of the tournament champions from the four Division I conferences (CCHA, ECAC, Hockey East and WCHA) received automatic invitations into the tournament with At-large bids making up the remaining 4 teams, 1 from each conference.

East							West						
Seed	School	Conference	Record	Berth type	Appearance	Last bid	Seed	School	Conference	Record	Berth type	Appearance	Last bid
1	Rensselaer	ECAC Hockey	32–2–0	Tournament champion	6th	1984	1	Michigan State	CCHA	37–5–0	Tournament champion	7th	1984
2	Boston College	Hockey East	27–12–2	At-large bid	13th	1984	2	Minnesota–Duluth	WCHA	33–8–3	Tournament champion	3rd	1984
3	Harvard	ECAC Hockey	21–7–2	At-large bid	10th	1983	3	Minnesota	WCHA	30–12–3	At-large bid	12th	1983
4	Providence	Hockey East	21–15–5	Tournament champion	5th	1983	4	Lake Superior State	CCHA	27–15–0	At-large bid	1st	Never

== Format ==
The tournament featured three rounds of play. The two odd-number ranked teams from one region were placed into a bracket with the two even-number ranked teams of the other region. The teams were then seeded according to their ranking. In the Quarterfinals the first and fourth seeds and the second and third seeds played two-game aggregate series to determine which school advanced to the Semifinals. Beginning with the Semifinals all games were played at the Joe Louis Arena and all series became Single-game eliminations. The winning teams in the semifinals advanced to the National Championship Game with the losers playing in a Third Place game.

== Tournament Bracket ==
Quarterfinals; March 22–24
E1	Rensselaer	7	3	10
W4	Lake Superior State	3	3	6
W2	Minnesota–Duluth	4	4	8
E3	Harvard	2	2	4
W1	Michigan State	3	2	5
E4	Providence	2	4	6
E2	Boston College	5	4	9
W3	Minnesota	7	1	8

Semifinals; March 28–29
E1	Rensselaer	6***
W2	Minnesota–Duluth	5
E4	Providence	4***
E2	Boston College	3

National Championship; March 30
E1	Rensselaer	2
E4	Providence	1
Third Place Game
W2	Minnesota–Duluth	7*
E2	Boston College	6

Note: * denotes overtime period(s)

=== Quarterfinals ===
==== (E1) Rensselaer vs. (W4) Lake Superior State ====
March 22	Rensselaer	7 – 3	Lake Superior State	Houston Field House	Recap
(Carter, Oates) Ken Hammond - 03:48 (Butryn, Friday) Neil Hernberg - PP - 09:01		First period	13:50 - Scott Johnson (Roque, Guy)
(Friday) Maurizio Mansi - 06:42		Second period	01:17 - Scott Johnson (Roque)
(Friday, Jooris) John Carter - PP GW - 02:30 (Oates) George Servinis - PP - 08:57 (Sadeghpour, Hammond) George Servinis - 11:07 (Butryn, Iturralde) Kraig Nienhuis - 13:57		Third period	05:27 - Kim McIvor (Cote)
(20 saves / 23 shots) Darren Puppa		Goalie stats	Randy Exelby (21 saves / 28 shots)

March 23	Rensselaer	3 – 3	Lake Superior State	Houston Field House	Recap
No scoring		First period	05:19 - Steve Hurt (Vichorek, Hewson)
(Hammond) Mike Sadeghpour - PP - 13:06 (Servinis, Carter) Adam Oates - PP - 13:32 (Iturralde) Terry Butryn - 16:22		Second period	19:44 - Craig Hewson (McIvor, Warus)
No scoring		Third period	10:19 - Allan Butler (Guy)
(29 saves / 32 shots) Darren Puppa		Goalie stats	Randy Exelby (31 saves / 34 shots)

Rensselaer won series 10–6

==== (E2) Boston College vs. (W3) Minnesota ====
March 22	Boston College	5 – 7	Minnesota	McHugh Forum	Recap
(Hodge) Doug Brown - 01:39		First period	04:37 - Corey Millen (Bergland, Shopek); 13:36 - PP - Wally Chapman (Parenteau, Okerlund)
(Houle, McNamara) Dan Shea - 10:10 (Harlow, D. Shea) Bob Sweeney - 14:17		Second period	08:29 - Rick Erdall (Micheletti, Champman); 12:26 - PP - Tom Rothstein (Erdall, Micheletti)
(McNamara, Sweeney) Scott Harlow - 05:45 (Sweeney, Hodge) Scott Harlow - PP - 16:39		Third period	05:32 - Corey Millen (unassisted); 10:29 - PP GW - Wally Chapman (Rothstein, Guentzel); 11:35 - PP - Tony Kellin (Millen, Micheletti)
(23 saves / 30 shots) Scott Gordon		Goalie stats	John Blue (33 saves / 38 shots)

March 23	Boston College	4 – 1	Minnesota	McHugh Forum	Recap
(Boudreau) Neil Shea - 01:02 (McNamara) Doug Brown - GW - 13:16 (Mitchell) Mike Gervasi - 14:44		First period	9:44 - Rick Erdall (Micheletti)
(Stevens, N. Shea) Bob Sweeney - 03:31		Second period	No scoring
No scoring		Third period	No scoring
(25 saves / 26 shots) Scott Gordon		Goalie stats	John Blue (31 saves / 35 shots)

Boston College won series 9–8

==== (W1) Michigan State vs. (E4) Providence ====
March 23	Michigan State	3 – 2	Providence	Munn Ice Arena
(McSween) Kelly Miller – 03:29		First period	16:43 – Peter Taglianetti (Yeomelakis)
No scoring		Second period	No scoring
(Kv. Miller) Harvey Smyl – 05:16 (unassisted) Brad Beck – GW – 17:12		Third period	15:34 – Steve Rooney (Army, Cavallini)

March 24	Michigan State	2 – 4	Providence	Munn Ice Arena
(Shibicky, Beck) Sean Clement – 15:17		First period	02:26 – John Deasey (DeVoe, Bianchi); 03:49 – Gord Cruickshank (Boudreault, Sullivan); 05:30 – GW – Dave Wilkie (Taglianetti, Catteral)
No scoring		Second period	13:20 – Rene Boudreault (unassisted)
(Beck, Flegel) Lyle Phair – 10:07		Third period	No scoring

Providence won series 6–5

==== (W2) Minnesota–Duluth vs. (E3) Harvard ====
March 22	Minnesota–Duluth	4 – 2	Harvard	DECC Arena	Recap
(Toninato, B. Johnson) Mark Odnokon - 04:52		First period	12:14 - Tim Smith (Taylor, MacDonald)
(Christensen, Herzig) Bill Watson - 03:47 (Hull, Christensen) Norm Maciver - PP GW - 05:21		Second period	01:35 - Brian Busconi (Kwong, Sweeney)
(Watson, Herzig) Jim Johnson - PP - 16:47		Third period	No scoring
(25 saves / 27 shots) Rick Kosti		Goalie stats	Grant Blair (31 saves / 35 shots)

March 23	Minnesota–Duluth	4 – 2	Harvard	DECC Arena	Recap
No scoring		First period	00:30 - Tim Smith (Fusco, MacDonald)
(Sprenger) Tom Herzig - 04:44 (Herzig, Watson) Norm Maciver - PP - 11:07		Second period	18:14 - Peter Chiarelli (Pawloski, Ohno)
(Watson, J. Johnson) Tom Herzig - GW - 03:23 (May) Darin Illikainen - 12:00		Third period	No scoring
(21 saves / 23 shots) Rick Kosti		Goalie stats	Grant Blair (36 saves / 40 shots)

Minnesota–Duluth won series 8–4

=== Semifinal ===
==== (E2) Boston College vs. (E4) Providence ====
March 28	Boston College	3 – 4	3OT	Providence	Joe Louis Arena	Recap
(Campedelli, D. Shea) Scott Harlow - PP - 15:20		First period		09:05 - Tim Army (Yeomelakis, Whitham); 09:56 - Peter Taglianetti (unassisted); 11:20 - Rene Boudreault (Cavallini, Sullivan)
No scoring		Second period		No scoring
(Emery, D. Shea) Dominic Campedelli - 00:27 (Harlow) Dan Shea - PP - 03:43		Third period		No scoring
No scoring		Third overtime period		00:33 - GW - Artie Yeomalikis (Army, Cavallini)
(22 saves / 26 shots) Scott Gordon		Goalie stats		Chris Terreri (62 saves / 65 shots)

==== (E1) Rensselaer vs. (W2) Minnesota–Duluth ====
March 29	Rensselaer	6 – 5	3OT	Minnesota–Duluth	Joe Louis Arena	Recap
(Oates, Robinson) Tim Friday - 05:47		First period		No scoring
(Friday, DiPronio) John Carter - PP - 15:13 (Oates) George Servinis - 17:23		Second period		03:46 - Mark Baron (Toninato, Odnokon); 04:13 - Mark Baron (Odnokon, Toninato); 19:14 - Brett Hull (B. Johnson)
(unassisted) George Servinis - SH - 02:53 (Oates, Sadeghpour) Ken Hammond - 18:08		Third period		07:04 - Bill Watson (Christensen); 13:10 - Tom Herzig (Baron, Toninato)
(Friday) John Carter - PP GW - 05:45		Third overtime period		No scoring
(32 saves / 37 shots) Darren Puppa		Goalie stats		Rick Kosti (37 saves / 43 shots)

=== Third Place Game ===
==== (W2) Minnesota–Duluth vs. (E2) Boston College ====
March 30	Minnesota–Duluth	7 – 6	OT	Boston College	Joe Louis Arena	Recap
(unassisted) Mark Baron - 14:35 (Watson) Matt Christensen - 17:32		First period		09:29 - PP - Ken Hodge Jr. (Stevens, Campedelli); 13:45 - Doug Brown (Barron)
(Christensen, Baron) Bill Watson - 02:09 (Baron, Toninato) Mark Odnokon - 05:35		Second period		No scoring
(unassisted) Matt Christensen - 06:28 (Watson, Maciver) Jim Johnson - PP - 13:39		Third period		05:49 - Doug Brown (unassisted); 09:00 - PP - Dan Shea (Harlow, Campedelli); 10:10 - Rob Emery (McNamara, Livingston); 12:11 - SH - Doug Brown (unassisted)
(Watson, Herzig) Matt Christensen - GW - 07:47		First overtime period		No scoring
(34 saves / 40 shots) Rick Kosti		Goalie stats		Shaun Real (38 saves / 45 shots)

=== National Championship ===
==== (E1) Rensselaer vs. (E4) Providence ====
March 30	Rensselaer	2 – 1	Providence	Joe Louis Arena

Scoring summary
Period	Team	Goal	Assist(s)	Time	Score
1st	RPI	Neil Hernberg – PP	DiPronio and Hammond	4:29	1–0 RPI
2nd	RPI	George Servinis – GW SH	unassisted	23:49	2–0 RPI
3rd	PC	Paul Cavallini – PP	Army and Rooney	50:00	2–1 RPI
Penalty summary
Period	Team	Player	Penalty	Time	PIM
1st	PC	Mike Brill	Cross-checking	2:44	2:00
1st	RPI	Maurice Mansi	Tripping	7:23	2:00
1st	PC	Gord Cruickshank	Tripping	9:07	2:00
1st	RPI	Kraig Nienhuis	Unnecessary roughness	11:10	2:00
1st	PC	Peter Taglianetti	Unnecessary roughness	11:10	2:00
1st	PC	Gord Cruickshank	Holding	16:12	2:00
1st	PC	Peter Taglianetti	High-sticking	18:30	2:00
2nd	RPI	Mark Jooris	Hooking	20:38	2:00
2nd	RPI	Mike Sadeghpour	Cross-checking	22:06	2:00
2nd	PC	Nowel Catterall	Slashing	36:12	2:00
2nd	RPI	Ken Hammond	Holding	38:30	2:00
3rd	PC	Rene Boudreault	Slashing	42:12	2:00
3rd	PC	Nowel Catterall	Delay of game	47:39	2:00
3rd	RPI	John Carter	Hooking	48:33	2:00

Shots by period
Team	1	2	3	T
Providence	8	4	10	22
Rensselaer	14	17	11	42

Goaltenders
Team	Name	Saves	Goals against	Time on ice
PC	Chris Terreri	40	2	
RPI	Daren Puppa	21	1	

== All-Tournament Team ==
- G: Chris Terreri* (Providence)
- D: Tim Friday (Rensselaer)
- D: Ken Hammond (Rensselaer)
- F: Adam Oates (Rensselaer)
- F: George Servinis (Rensselaer)
- F: Bill Watson (Minnesota-Duluth)

* Most Outstanding Player(s)
