= 2009–10 CCHL season =

- League: Central Canadian Hockey League
- Sport: Hockey
- Duration: Regular season 2009-09-09 – 2010-02-08; Playoffs; 2010-02-09 – 2010-03-30
- Teams: 21
- Finals champions: Newmarket Hurricanes

CCHL seasons
- 2008–09 OJHL 2010–11 OJHL

The 2009–10 CCHL season was the first and only season of the Central Canadian Hockey League (CCHL). The 21 teams of the East and West Divisions competed in 50 regular season games, with the top eight teams in each division competing in the playoffs for the league championship.

The CCHL's playoff champion played against the Ontario Junior A Hockey League's champion for the Buckland Cup. The champion of that series played for the Dudley Hewitt Cup against the Northern Ontario Junior Hockey League and Superior International Junior Hockey League champions for the right to attend the 2010 Royal Bank Cup.

The league re-merged with the Ontario Junior A Hockey League after the 2009–10 season, and re-formed the Ontario Junior Hockey League.

== Changes ==
- OJHL is dissolved. Central Division becomes its own league.
- Central Division Hockey is renamed Central Canadian Hockey League.
- Toronto Dixie Beehives have relocated to Etobicoke, Ontario and changed name to Dixie Beehives.
- Upper Canada Hockey Club has relocated to Etobicoke, Ontario and changed name to Upper Canada Patriots.

== Standings ==
Note: GP = Games played; W = Wins; L = Losses; OTL = Overtime losses; SL = Shootout losses; GF = Goals for; GA = Goals against; PTS = Points; x = clinched playoff berth; y = clinched division title; z = clinched conference title

East Division
Team	Centre	W–L–OTL–SOL	GF–GA	Points
x-Bowmanville Eagles	Bowmanville	32-13-1-4	181-132	69
x-Wellington Dukes	Wellington	31-12-1-6	172-128	69
x-Markham Waxers	Markham	29-15-4-2	210-175	64
x-Stouffville Spirit	Stouffville	28-19-2-1	153-140	59
x-Peterborough Stars	Peterborough	26-18-3-3	175-182	58
x-Lindsay Muskies	Lindsay	26-20-1-3	192-173	56
x-Whitby Fury	Whitby	24-22-1-3	182-198	52
x-Ajax Attack	Ajax	24-25-0-1	208-235	49
y-Cobourg Cougars	Cobourg	18-25-3-4	195-198	43
y-Pickering Panthers	Pickering	15-31-4-0	178-252	34
West Division
Team	Centre	W–L–OTL–SOL	GF–GA	Points
x-Burlington Cougars	Burlington	39-8-2-1	313-183	81
x-Newmarket Hurricanes	Newmarket	32-12-3-3	165-123	70
x-Hamilton Red Wings	Hamilton	31-16-1-2	204-163	65
x-Orangeville Crushers	Orangeville	29-16-2-3	215-184	63
x-Streetsville Derbys	Toronto	27-18-2-3	218-194	59
x-Toronto Jr. Canadiens	Toronto	27-19-3-1	218-195	58
x-St. Michael's Buzzers	Toronto	25-21-3-1	194-205	54
x-North York Rangers	Toronto	24-21-1-4	176-196	53
y-Upper Canada Patriots	Toronto	15-31-1-3	163-244	34
y-Dixie Beehives	Toronto	12-37-0-1	146-241	25
y-Seguin Bruins	Humphrey	11-38-1-0	140-257	23

Top eight from each division make the playoffs (blue tinted), (x-) denotes playoff berth, (y-) denotes elimination.

Teams listed on the official league website.

Standings listed by Pointstreak on official league website.

== Playoffs ==
Division Quarter-final	Division Semi-final
E1	Bowmanville	4
E8	Ajax	0
E1	Bowmanville	4
E5	Peterborough	3
E4	Stouffville	0
E5	Peterborough	4
East
E2	Wellington	4
E7	Whitby	0
E2	Wellington	4
E3	Markham	3
E3	Markham	4
E6	Lindsay	2
W1	Burlington	4
W8	North York	0
W1	Burlington	4
W5	Streetsville	0
W4	Orangeville	2
W5	Streetsville	4
West
W2	Newmarket	4
W7	St. Michael's	1
W2	Newmarket	4
W3	Hamilton	0
W3	Hamilton	4
W6	Toronto	3

Division Final
E1	Bowmanville	4
E2	Wellington	1
W1	Burlington	0
W2	Newmarket	4

League Final
E1	Bowmanville	2
W2	Newmarket	4

== Buckland Cup ==
The Buckland Cup is the Junior "A" Championship of the Ontario Hockey Association. The winner of the Buckland Cup moves on to the 2010 Dudley Hewitt Cup.

Oakville Blades (OJAHL) defeated Newmarket Hurricanes 4-games-to-2

Game 1: 04/03/2010 - Newmarket 3 @ Oakville 4
Game 2: 04/05/2010 - Oakville 1 @ Newmarket 4
Game 3: 04/07/2010 - Newmarket 3 @ Oakville 1
Game 4: 04/08/2010 - Oakville 3 @ Newmarket 2
Game 5: 04/10/2010 - Newmarket 3 @ Oakville 4 OT
Game 6: 04/12/2010 - Oakville 6 @ Newmarket 1

== Scoring leaders ==
Note: GP = Games played; G = Goals; A = Assists; Pts = Points; PIM = Penalty minutes

Player	Team	GP	G	A	Pts	PIM
Josh Jooris	Burlington Cougars	50	26	90	116	42
Greg Carey	Burlington Cougars	48	72	42	114	46
Blake Brody	Ajax Attack	47	47	47	94	46
Jordan Reed	Ajax Attack	50	38	53	91	24
Daniel Ciampini	St. Michael's Buzzers	49	42	46	88	64
Justin Baker	Streetsville Derbys	47	24	56	80	70
Zach Hyman	Hamilton Red Wings	49	35	40	75	30
Kevin George	Lindsay Muskies	50	41	33	74	66
Adam Place	Bowmanville Eagles	50	40	32	72	22
Issac Kohls	Streetsville Derbys	49	35	37	72	24

== Leading goaltenders ==
Note: GP = Games played; Mins = Minutes played; W = Wins; L = Losses: OTL = Overtime losses; SL = Shootout losses; GA = Goals Allowed; SO = Shutouts; GAA = Goals against average

Player	Team	GP	Mins	W	L	OTL	SOL	GA	SO	Sv%	GAA
Jordan Ruby	Wellington Dukes	34	2005:52	21	6	1	5	73	0	.932	2.18
Jim Sarjeant	Newmarket Hurricanes	34	1964:32	21	7	2	2	72	1	.927	2.20
Jackson Teichroeb	Bowmanville Eagles	34	2000:58	21	8	1	3	77	2	.916	2.31
Kori Coelho	Stouffville Spirit	43	2533:55	25	16	2	0	109	1	.915	2.58
Drew Fielding	Hamilton Red Wings	26	1450:43	18	6	0	1	74	2	.910	3.06

== Award winners ==
Overall

- Top Scorer - Josh Jooris (Burlington Cougars)

Eastern Conference

- Best Defenceman - Jeff Least (Markham Waxers)
- Most Gentlemanly Player - Jeremy Franklin (Wellington Dukes)
- Most Improved Player - Jordan Reed (Ajax Attack)
- Most Valuable Player - Kori Coelho (Stouffville Spirit)
- Rookie of the Year - Jackson Teichroeb (Bowmanville Eagles)
- Coach of the Year - Curtis Hodgins (Bowmanville Eagles)
- Best Goaltender - Jodan Ruby (Wellington Dukes)

Western Conference

- Best Defenceman - Justin Baker (Streetsville Derbys)
- Most Gentlemanly Player - Jacob Mooney (North York Rangers)
- Most Improved Player - Phil Brewer (Burlington Cougars)
- Most Valuable Player - Greg Carey (Burlington Cougars)
- Rookie of the Year - Lucas Lessio (St. Michael's Buzzers)
- Coach of the Year - Mark Jooris (Burlington Cougars)
- Best Goaltender - Jimmy Sarjeant (Newmarket Hurricanes)

== Players selected in 2010 NHL entry draft ==
- Rd 3 #77 Alexander Guptill - Dallas Stars (Orangeville Crushers)
- Rd 3 #87 Julian Melchiori - Atlanta Thrashers (Newmarket Hurricanes)
- Rd 5 #123 Zach Hyman - Florida Panthers (Hamilton Red Wings)

== See also ==
- 2010 Royal Bank Cup
- Dudley Hewitt Cup
- List of Ontario Hockey Association Junior A seasons
- Ontario Junior A Hockey League
- Northern Ontario Junior Hockey League
- Superior International Junior Hockey League
- Greater Ontario Junior Hockey League
- 2009 in ice hockey
- 2010 in ice hockey

Preceded by 2008–09 OJHL season	Ontario Hockey Association; Junior A seasons	Succeeded by 2010–11 OJHL season
