= 1985 ECAC Hockey men's ice hockey tournament =

1985 ECAC Men's ice hockey tournament
- Dates: March 8–16, 1985
- Teams: 8
- Finals site: Boston Garden; Boston, Massachusetts
- Champions: Rensselaer (2nd title)
- Winning coach: Mike Addesa (2nd title)
- MVP: Daren Puppa (Rensselaer)
- ECAC Men's Ice Hockey Tournaments

The 1985 ECAC Hockey Men's Ice Hockey Tournament was the 24th tournament in league history. It was played between March 8 and March 16, 1985. Quarterfinal games were played at home team campus sites, while the 'final four' games were played at the Boston Garden in Boston, Massachusetts. By winning the tournament, Rensselaer received the ECAC's automatic bid to the 1985 NCAA Division I Men's Ice Hockey Tournament.

== Format ==
The tournament featured three rounds of play. The four teams that finish below eighth place in the standings are not eligible for tournament play. In the quarterfinals the first seed and eighth seed, the second seed and seventh seed, the third seed and sixth seed and the fourth seed and fifth seed played a two-game series to determine the winner. In the two games no overtime was permitted and if the two teams remained tied after the two games then a 10-minute mini-game would be played where a sudden-death overtime was allowed if the scheduled time did not produce a victor. After the opening round every series becomes a single-elimination game. In the semifinals, the highest seed plays the lowest remaining seed while the two remaining teams play with the winners advancing to the championship game and the losers advancing to the third place game. The tournament champion receives an automatic bid to the 1985 NCAA Division I Men's Ice Hockey Tournament.

== Conference standings ==
Note: GP = Games played; W = Wins; L = Losses; T = Ties; PTS = Points; GF = Goals For; GA = Goals Against

1984–85 ECAC Hockey standings
	Conference							Overall					
	GP	W	L	T	PTS	GF	GA	GP	W	L	T	GF	GA
Rensselaer†*	21	20	1	0	40	139	54	38	35	2	1	245	100
Harvard	21	15	5	1	31	99	58	32	21	9	2	147	96
Clarkson	21	15	6	0	30	87	59	34	21	10	3	143	104
Cornell	21	14	6	1	29	101	78	30	18	10	2	145	115
Yale	21	13	7	1	27	93	78	31	19	11	1	148	122
St. Lawrence	21	12	9	0	24	75	70	32	17	13	2	122	122
Colgate	21	9	12	0	18	75	77	32	14	18	0	122	122
Princeton	21	7	12	2	16	58	74	28	12	14	2	96	105
Brown	21	6	15	0	12	59	81	26	9	17	0	76	102
Vermont	21	4	17	0	8	46	97	29	8	21	0	75	128
Dartmouth	21	3	17	1	7	49	122	24	5	18	1	63	139
Army^	11	0	11	0	0	29	60	30	17	13	0	150	121
Championship: Rensselaer † indicates conference regular season champion * indicates conference tournament champion^ Army played a half schedule

== Bracket ==
Teams are reseeded after the first round

Quarterfinals; March 8–9
1	Rensselaer	7	11	—
8	Princeton	2	4	—
2	Harvard	4	10	—
7	Colgate	2	2	—
(Pairings are reseeded after the first round)
3	Clarkson	6	4	—
6	St. Lawrence	2	4	—
4	Cornell	9	4	—
5	Yale	2	2	—

Semifinals; March 15
1	Rensselaer	5
4	Cornell	1
2	Harvard	2
3	Clarkson	1

Championship; March 16
1	Rensselaer	3
2	Harvard	1
Third Place
3	Clarkson	3
4	Cornell	5

Note: * denotes overtime period(s)

=== Quarterfinals ===
==== (1) Rensselaer vs. (8) Princeton ====
March 8	Rensselaer	7 – 2	Princeton	Houston Field House

March 9	Rensselaer	11 – 4	Princeton	Houston Field House

Rensselaer won series 2–0

==== (2) Harvard vs. (7) Colgate ====
March 8	Harvard	4 – 2	Colgate	Bright Hockey Center

March 9	Harvard	10 – 2	Colgate	Bright Hockey Center

Harvard won series 2–0

==== (3) Clarkson vs. (6) St. Lawrence ====
March 8	Clarkson	6 – 2	St. Lawrence	Walker Arena

March 9	Clarkson	4 – 4	St. Lawrence	Walker Arena

Clarkson won series 1–0–1

==== (4) Cornell vs. (5) Yale ====
March 8	Cornell	9 – 2	Yale	Lynah Rink

March 9	Cornell	4 – 2	Yale	Lynah Rink

Cornell won series 2–0

=== Semifinals ===
==== (1) Rensselaer vs. (4) Cornell ====
March 15	Rensselaer	5 – 1	Cornell	Boston Garden

==== (2) Harvard vs. (3) Clarkson ====
March 15	Harvard	2 – 1	Clarkson	Boston Garden

=== Third Place ===
==== (3) Clarkson vs. (4) Cornell ====
March 16	Clarkson	3 – 5	Cornell	Boston Garden

=== Championship ===
==== (1) Rensselaer vs. (2) Harvard ====
March 16	Rensselaer	3 – 1	Harvard	Boston Garden

== Tournament awards ==
=== All-Tournament Team ===
None

=== MOP ===
- Daren Puppa (Rensselaer)
