= Ken Hammond (ice hockey) =

Canadian ice hockey player (born 1963)

- Born: August 22, 1963 (age 62) Port Credit, Ontario, Canada
- Height: 6 ft 1 in (185 cm)
- Weight: 190 lb (86 kg; 13 st 8 lb)
- Position: Defence
- Shot: Left
- Played for: Los Angeles Kings; Edmonton Oilers; New York Rangers; Toronto Maple Leafs; Boston Bruins; San Jose Sharks; Vancouver Canucks; Ottawa Senators
- NHL draft: 147th overall, 1983; Los Angeles Kings
- Playing career: 1985–1996

Kenneth Paul Hammond (born August 22, 1963) is a Canadian former professional ice hockey player. Hammond was born in Port Credit, Ontario (now Mississauga). He played as a defenceman in college hockey with the Rensselaer Polytechnic Institute Engineers, winning the 1985 NCAA Division I Men's Ice Hockey Tournament championship and was named a First Team All-American. He was drafted by the Los Angeles Kings of the National Hockey League (NHL) in the eighth round, 147th overall, in the 1983 NHL entry draft. He played with the Kings, Edmonton Oilers, New York Rangers, Toronto Maple Leafs, Boston Bruins, San Jose Sharks, and Ottawa Senators in the NHL between 1985 and 1993. He played in both the Sharks and Senators inaugural games. He finished his career in the minor leagues, retiring in 1996.

== Youth and college career ==
Hammond played as a defenceman with the London Diamonds in the Ontario Hockey Association's Junior B league in the 1980–81 season. He then joined the Rensselaer Polytechnic Institute Engineers of the ECAC Hockey conference, an NCAA Division I conference. In his freshman season, the 1981–82 season, Hammond appeared in 24 games, scoring two goals and five points. In 1982–83, Hammond improved his offensive production, as he scored four goals and 17 points in 28 games.

In 1983–84, Hammond was named co-captain of RPI alongside Mike Dark. In 34 games, Hammond scored five goals and 16 points. The Engineers won the ECAC Division I championship on March 11, 1984, and participated in the 1984 NCAA Division I Men's Ice Hockey Tournament. However, the Engineers were defeated by the North Dakota Fighting Hawks in the quarterfinals. In his final season with RPI, Hammond led the team to their second ECAC Division I championship and the 1985 NCAA Division I Men's Ice Hockey Tournament championship. Hammond played in 38 games, scoring 11 goals and 39 points, and was named a First Team All-American and First Team All-NCAA Tournament team selection along with teammate Adam Oates. He was also named to the 1985 ECAC First All-Star Team, along with teammates Oates and John Carter.

== Professional career ==
=== Los Angeles Kings ===
Hammond was selected by the Los Angeles Kings of the National Hockey League (NHL) in the eighth round, 147th overall, at the 1983 NHL entry draft. He signed with the Kings on April 1, 1985. Hammond made his NHL debut at the end of the 1984–85 season with the Kings on April 2 in a 6–4 loss to the Edmonton Oilers. On April 5, 1985, Hammond scored his first career NHL goal and point, against Richard Brodeur of the Vancouver Canucks in a 4–3 victory. Overall, Hammond appeared in three games, scoring the one goal. On April 10, Hammond appeared in his first NHL career playoff game, a 3–2 loss to the Edmonton Oilers. He played in three post-season games with Los Angeles, earning no points.

Hammond began the 1985–86 season with the Kings, appearing in three games. He made his season debut on October 10, 1985, in a 6–5 loss to the Vancouver Canucks. In his second game on October 13, Hammond earned his first assist on a goal by Dave Williams in a 9–2 loss to the Calgary Flames. He was assigned to the Kings' affiliate, the New Haven Nighthawks of the American Hockey League (AHL), for the remainder of 1985–86 season on October 28. In 67 games with the Nighthawks, Hammond scored four goals and 16 points, and accumulated 96 penalty minutes, helping the club reach the playoffs. In four playoff games, Hammond was held off the score sheet. In 1986–87, Hammond was once again assigned to New Haven and spent a majority of the season with the Nighthawks and in 66 games, he scored a goal and 16 points. Hammond was recalled by the Kings in February 1987 and made his NHL season debut on February 18 in a 7–4 victory over the Washington Capitals. He registered his first point of the season with an assist on Jimmy Carson's third period goal in an 8–3 victory over the Winnipeg Jets on February 24. In total he played in ten games, scoring two points. After the return of defenceman Dean Kennedy to the Kings' lineup on March 8, Hammond was returned to New Haven the next day. Hammond added one assist in six playoff games with New Haven.

Hammond began the 1987–88 season with New Haven. In 26 games, he scored three goals and 11 points. He was recalled by Los Angeles on November 17. and made his NHL season debut that night in a 4–3 loss to the New York Islanders. Hammond registered his first point of the season on November 25 with an assist on Luc Robitaille's goal in the first period in a 6–4 victory over the Chicago Blackhawks. He was returned to New Haven before getting a second recall on December 21. On December 30, 1987, Hammond recorded his first multi-point NHL game, scoring a goal (his first of the season) and an assist in a 6–4 win over the Winnipeg Jets. On February 6, 1988, Hammond had his first career multi-goal game, scoring two goals on goaltender Grant Fuhr, his replacement Warren Skorodenski, and the Edmonton Oilers in a 7–2 win. Fuhr was pulled from the game for Skorodenski against the Kings, the first time in Fuhr's career as he had an excellent record against Los Angeles. In total, Hammond played in 46 games with Los Angeles, scoring seven goals and 16 points while getting 69 penalty minutes. In the playoffs, Hammond played in two games, earning no points and a -5 rating. Hammond, along with goaltender Glenn Healy, were co-winners of the Kings' Rookie of the Year Award. In the offseason, he was re-signed by the Kings and was among those discussed as part of the Kings' package in the trade for Wayne Gretzky. Unable to stick with the Kings out of training camp due to the intense competition of ten players for the defence, on October 3, 1988, Hammond was left unprotected in the waiver draft and was claimed by the Edmonton Oilers.

=== Edmonton, New York, Toronto ===
Hammond began the 1988–89 season with the Edmonton Oilers, appearing in his first game with the team on October 9, 1988, earning no points in a 5–4 win over the Winnipeg Jets. On October 12, Hammond earned his first point as an Oiler, an assist on a goal scored by Jari Kurri in a 6–2 loss to the Vancouver Canucks. Overall, Hammond appeared in five games with Edmonton, earning the one assist.

On November 1, Hammond was placed on waivers by the Oilers to make room for Craig Redmond who himself had been placed on waivers by the New York Rangers and had been claimed by Edmonton. Redmond had requested to be sent back to Edmonton and Rangers general manager Phil Esposito acquiesced. In return, Esposito claimed Hammond. Hammond debuted with the Rangers on November 2, replacing the injured Ron Greschner, and was held pointless in a 6–4 loss to the Buffalo Sabres. After three games, in which Hammond did not earn a point, he was sent to the Rangers International Hockey League (IHL) affiliate, the Denver Rangers once Greschner returned from injury on November 15. In 38 games with Denver, Hammond scored five goals and 23 points.

On February 19, 1989, the Rangers traded Hammond to the Toronto Maple Leafs in exchange for Chris McRae. Hammond made his debut with the Maple Leafs on February 20 against the Kings in a 5–4 loss. Hammond earned his first point, an assist on the game-winning goal scored by Vincent Damphousse in a 4–2 win over the Minnesota North Stars on February 25. In total, Hammond played in 14 games with Toronto in the 1988–89 season, earning two assists. In 1989–90, the Leafs assigned Hammond to their AHL affiliate, the Newmarket Saints. In 75 games with Newmarket, Hammond scored nine goals and 54 points while earning 106 penalty minutes. In the offseason, Hammond negotiated a contract with the Boston Bruins' general manager Harry Sinden. On August 20, 1990, the Maple Leafs traded Hammond's rights to the Bruins for cash as he already had an agreement in place with Boston.

=== Boston, San Jose, Vancouver, Ottawa ===
Hammond was assigned by the Bruins to their AHL affiliate, the Maine Mariners, for the 1990–91 season. In 80 games with Maine, Hammond scored 10 goals and 51 points, and accumulated 159 penalty minutes. In two playoff games with the Mariners, Hammond had no points and 16 penalty minutes. Hammond also appeared in one game with the Bruins during the 1990–91 season. On March 31, 1991, Hammond made his only regular season appearance with Boston, scoring a goal against Kay Whitmore of the Hartford Whalers in a 7–3 win. Hammond then appeared in eight playoff games for Boston, earning no points. Following the season, Hammond became an unrestricted free agent.

On August 9, 1991, Hammond signed with the expansion San Jose Sharks for the 1991–92 season. Hammond played in the Sharks' inaugural game on October 4, 1991, in which he was held pointless in a 4–3 loss to the Vancouver Canucks. On October 10, Hammond scored his first goal for the Sharks on a slapshot that beat Stéphane Beauregard in a 5–4 loss to the Winnipeg Jets. On November 8, Hammond earned two assists in a 6–2 victory over the Edmonton Oilers. He suffered a groin injury in January and returned February 4 after missing five games. In a game against the Vancouver Canucks on February 21, Hammond broke a knuckle in a fight with Geoff Courtnall, and was sidelined for three to four weeks. With the Sharks, Hammond played in 46 games, scoring five goals and 15 points, and earned 86 penalty minutes.

On March 9, 1992, the NHL's trade deadline day, Hammond was traded to the Vancouver Canucks for an eighth round draft pick in the 1992 NHL entry draft. Hammond made his Canucks debut in the 1992 Stanley Cup playoffs on May 10, 1992, after three Vancouver defencemen were declared out with injury. He earned no points and four penalty minutes in a 4–3 win over the Edmonton Oilers. In two playoff games for the Canucks, Hammond had no points and six penalty minutes.

Hammond was left unprotected by the Canucks in the 1992 NHL expansion draft. On June 18, 1992, Hammond was selected by the Ottawa Senators. For the second time in two seasons, Hammond was on an expansion team, as he joined the Senators for the 1992–93 season. Hammond debuted with Ottawa during their inaugural game on October 8, 1992, and scored his first goal for the Senators that night against Patrick Roy of the Montreal Canadiens in a 5–3 win. In 62 games with Ottawa, Hammond scored four goals and eight points, getting 104 penalty minutes. In January 1993 Hammond was assigned to the Senators AHL affiliate, the New Haven Senators. He played in four games, earning an assist.

=== Later career ===
Hammond took part in Ottawa's 1993 training camp, but failed to make the team and was assigned to their new AHL affiliate, the Prince Edward Island Senators, in late September. The Senators bought Hammond out of his contract after he was assigned to the AHL. Hammond signed with the Providence Bruins of the AHL for the 1993–94 season. In 65 games, he scored 12 goals and 57 points. At the end of the season, he was named Providence's most valuable player.

Hammond signed with the Kansas City Blades of the IHL for the 1994–95 season. In 76 games, Hammond scored three goals and 27 points, helping the club to the post-season. In 21 playoff games, Hammond had a goal and five points, as Kansas City lost in the final round of the Turner Cup playoffs. Hammond returned to the Blades for the 1995–96 season. In 33 games, he scored a goal and eight points. Hammond announced his retirement on January 3, 1996. Hammond then served as color commentator for Blades home radio broadcasts.

== Personal life ==
Hammond completed his degree in civil engineering and later returned to achieve a Master of Business Administration postgraduate degree in finance and accounting, taking a position with Ernst & Young after his retirement from hockey.

== Career statistics ==
=== Regular season and playoffs ===
			Regular season					Playoffs
Season	Team	League	GP	G	A	Pts	PIM	GP	G	A	Pts	PIM
1980–81	London Diamonds	WOHL	39	12	34	46	65	—	—	—	—	—
1981–82	RPI	NCAA	29	2	3	5	54	—	—	—	—	—
1982–83	RPI	NCAA	28	4	13	17	54	—	—	—	—	—
1983–84	RPI	NCAA	34	5	11	16	72	—	—	—	—	—
1984–85	RPI	NCAA	38	11	28	39	90	—	—	—	—	—
1984–85	Los Angeles Kings	NHL	3	1	0	1	0	3	0	0	0	4
1985–86	New Haven Nighthawks	AHL	67	4	12	16	96	4	0	0	0	7
1985–86	Los Angeles Kings	NHL	3	0	1	1	2	—	—	—	—	—
1986–87	New Haven Nighthawks	AHL	66	1	15	16	76	6	0	1	1	21
1986–87	Los Angeles Kings	NHL	10	0	2	2	11	—	—	—	—	—
1987–88	New Haven Nighthawks	AHL	26	3	8	11	27	—	—	—	—	—
1987–88	Los Angeles Kings	NHL	46	7	9	16	69	2	0	0	0	4
1988–89	Edmonton Oilers	NHL	5	0	1	1	8	—	—	—	—	—
1988–89	New York Rangers	NHL	3	0	0	0	0	—	—	—	—	—
1988–89	Denver Rangers	IHL	38	5	18	23	24	—	—	—	—	—
1988–89	Toronto Maple Leafs	NHL	14	0	2	2	12	—	—	—	—	—
1989–90	Newmarket Saints	AHL	75	9	45	54	106	—	—	—	—	—
1990–91	Maine Mariners	AHL	80	10	41	51	159	2	0	1	1	16
1990–91	Boston Bruins	NHL	1	1	0	1	2	8	0	0	0	10
1991–92	San Jose Sharks	NHL	46	5	10	15	82	—	—	—	—	—
1991–92	Vancouver Canucks	NHL	—	—	—	—	—	2	0	0	0	6
1992–93	New Haven Senators	AHL	4	0	1	1	4	—	—	—	—	—
1992–93	Ottawa Senators	NHL	62	4	4	8	102	—	—	—	—	—
1993–94	Providence Bruins	AHL	65	12	45	57	100	—	—	—	—	—
1994–95	Kansas City Blades	IHL	76	3	24	27	151	21	1	4	5	45
1995–96	Kansas City Blades	IHL	33	1	7	8	62	—	—	—	—	—
AHL totals			383	39	167	206	568	12	0	2	2	44
IHL totals			147	9	49	58	237	21	1	4	5	45
NHL totals			193	18	29	47	290	15	0	0	0	24

== Awards and honors ==
Award	Year
All-ECAC Hockey First Team	1984–85
AHCA East First-Team All-American	1984–85
All-NCAA All-Tournament Team	1985
