= Scott Gordon (ice hockey) =

American ice hockey player and coach

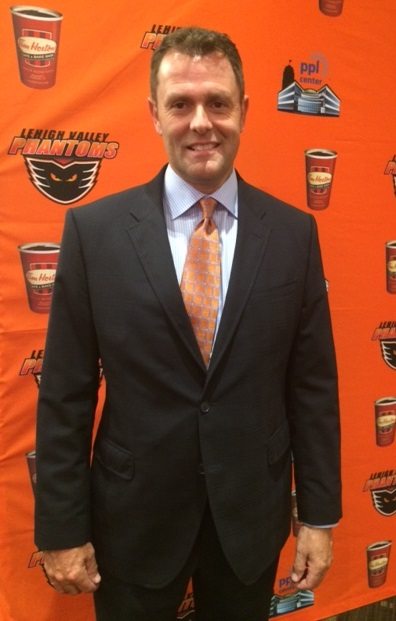
- Gordon in 2015
- Born: February 6, 1963 (age 63) Brockton, Massachusetts, U.S.
- Height: 5 ft 10 in (178 cm)
- Weight: 175 lb (79 kg; 12 st 7 lb)
- Position: Goaltender
- Caught: Left
- Played for: Quebec Nordiques
- Coached for: New York Islanders; Philadelphia Flyers
- National team: United States
- NHL draft: Undrafted
- Playing career: 1986–1994
- Coaching career: 1994–present

Scott M. Gordon (born February 6, 1963) is an American professional ice hockey coach and former professional goaltender. He is currently the head coach for the Waterloo Black Hawks of the United States Hockey League (USHL). He previously served as the head coach of the NHL's New York Islanders from 2008 to 2010 and the head coach of the National Hockey League's Philadelphia Flyers in the 2018–19 season, and, as well as the head coach of the Providence Bruins and Lehigh Valley Phantoms of the American Hockey League (AHL) between 2002 and 2021. Before coaching he played 23 games in the NHL with the Quebec Nordiques during the 1989–90 and 1990–91 seasons, and in the minor leagues from 1986 to 1994. Internationally he played for the American national team at the 1992 Winter Olympics and the 1991 World Championships. Gordon was born in Brockton, Massachusetts, but grew up in Easton, Massachusetts.

== College career ==
=== Boston College (1982–1986) ===
Gordon began his collegiate career with the Boston College Eagles in the 1982–83 season, where in nine games, he posted a 3–3–0 record with a 2.43 goals against average (GAA).

Gordon became the Eagles' starting goaltender in 1983–84, where in 35 games, he had a 21–13–0 record and a 3.74 GAA, helping Boston College qualify for the 1984 NCAA Division I Men's Ice Hockey Tournament. The Eagles faced off against the Michigan State Spartans, where they lost the two-game total goal series 13–8.

Gordon retained his starter's job for the 1984–85 season, as he went 23–11–2 with a 3.61 GAA in 36 games played. On March 16, 1985, in a game against the Providence College Friars, Gordon and Friars goaltender Chris Terreri made hockey history, as both goalies placed water bottles on the top of their nets, the first time that goalies placed water bottles on the top of their nets in a hockey game. Gordon led Boston College into the 1985 NCAA Division I Men's Ice Hockey Tournament, as the Eagles reached the semi-finals before losing to Providence 4–3 in triple overtime.

Gordon returned for one last season with Boston in 1985–86, where in 32 games, he posted a 17–8–1 record and a 3.63 GAA. He was named to the Hockey East First-Team All-Star in 1986. Boston College qualified for the 1986 NCAA Division I Men's Ice Hockey Tournament, however, they lost to the Minnesota Golden Gophers 11–7 in the East Regional Semi-finals.

== Professional career ==
=== Quebec Nordiques (1986–1992) ===
Gordon was not drafted, but on October 2, 1986, he signed as a free agent with the Quebec Nordiques of the NHL. The Nordiques assigned Gordon to the Fredericton Express of the AHL for the 1986–87 season. In 31 games, he had a 10–12–2 record with a 4.47 GAA and .875 save percentage as the Express failed to qualify for the playoffs.

In the 1987–88 season, the Nordiques assigned Gordon to the AHL's Baltimore Skipjacks, and in 34 games, Gordon posted a 7–18–3 record with a 5.61 GAA and .861 save percentage. His seven wins led the Skipjacks, as Baltimore finished in last place in the league, missing the playoffs.

Gordon spent most of the 1988–89 season with the Johnstown Chiefs of the ECHL. In 31 games, Gordon had a record of 18–9–3 with a 3.82 GAA and a .888 save percentage, as Johnstown finished in second place in the League. In the postseason, Gordon went 7–4 with a 3.34 GAA in 11 games as the Chiefs lost to the Carolina Thunderbirds in the Riley Cup Finals. Gordon also saw some action with the Halifax Citadels of the AHL during the 1988–89 season, going 0–2–0 with a 5.17 GAA and a .825 save percentage in two games.

Gordon played most of the 1989–90 with the Nordiques' AHL affiliate, the Halifax Citadels, where in 48 games, he had a 28–16–3 record with a 3.33 GAA and a .887 save percentage, leading Halifax into the playoffs. In six playoff games, he also posted a 2–4 record with a 4.94 GAA as the Citadels lost to the Sherbrooke Canadiens in the North Division Semi-finals.

Gordon also made his NHL debut in the 1989–90 season with the Nordiques. He played his first game on January 30, 1990, as he took the loss in a 5–2 defeat against the Buffalo Sabres. After losing his first four games in the NHL, Gordon recorded his first victory, as on February 6, 1990, he made 26 saves in a 5–3 victory over the Vancouver Canucks. Overall, Gordon was 2–8–0 with a 5.33 GAA and .856 save percentage in ten games for the Nordiques. Gordon also became the first-ever former ECHL player to appear in the NHL.

Gordon began the 1990–91 season with the Nordiques, where in 13 games, he had a record of 0–8–0 with a 5.94 GAA and .787 save percentage. He also spent the majority of the 1990–91 AHL season with the Citadels, as Gordon posted a 12–10–2 record with a 3.70 GAA and .879 save percentage for Halifax. The club, however, failed to reach the postseason.

Gordon split the 1991–92 season between the Citadels — where in seven games, he had a 3–3–1 record with a 3.82 GAA and .886 save percentage — and the New Haven Nighthawks, where Gordon was 3–1–0 with a 2.76 GAA and .898 save percentage in four games. In two playoff games with the Nighthawks, Gordon was 0–2 with a 4.54 GAA as the Nighthawks lost to the Adirondack Red Wings in the North Division Semi-finals. Following the season, Gordon became a free agent and signed with the Nashville Knights of the ECHL.

=== Nashville Knights (1992–1993) ===
Gordon spent the 1992–93 season with the Nashville Knights of the ECHL. In 23 games, he had a 13–9–1 record with a 4.30 GAA and .889 save percentage, helping Nashville qualify for the playoffs. In nine playoff games, Gordon had a 5–4 record with a 4.38 GAA as the Knights lost to the Toledo Storm in the semi-finals.

=== Knoxville Cherokees (1993–1994) ===
Gordon began the 1993–94 season with the Knoxville Cherokees of the ECHL, as in 26 games, he posted a 15–10–1 record and a .874 save percentage. He left the team late in the season to join the Atlanta Knights of the IHL.

=== Atlanta Knights (1994) ===
Gordon joined the Knights late in 1993–94, where in five games, he had a record of 0–1–3 with a 3.35 GAA and .888 save percentage. He became the youngest Head Coach in the league's 53-year history at 32 years of age. Gordon did not see any action in the postseason, as the Knights won the Turner Cup, defeating the Fort Wayne Komets in the finals.

At the end of the season, Gordon announced his retirement and joined the Knights' coaching staff.

=== International career ===
Gordon represented the United States during his international career. He appeared in the 1991 Men's World Ice Hockey Championships held in Finland, where in two games, he was 0–1–0 with a 7.50 GAA, as the USA finished in fourth place.

Gordon spent most of the 1991–92 season playing for the U.S., where in 29 games, he went 13–12–3 with a 4.03 GAA. Gordon also appeared in one game at the 1992 Winter Olympics held in Albertville, France, where he had a 0–0–0 record with a 7.06 GAA in 17 minutes of play as the Americans finished in fourth place.

== Coaching career ==
=== Atlanta Knights (1994–1996) ===
Gordon became an assistant coach with the Atlanta Knights of the IHL for the 1994–95 season under head coach John Paris Jr. Atlanta finished the season with a 39–37–5 record, earning 83 points for third place in the Central Division, and a trip to the playoffs. In the first round of the postseason, the Knights lost to the Las Vegas Thunder in five games.

In the 1995–96 season, Gordon remained with the Knights, however, midway through the season, the club fired Paris but retained Gordon. Atlanta finished the season with a 32–41–9 record, earning 73 points, and fourth place in the Central Division. The Knights qualified for the playoffs but were swept by the Cincinnati Cyclones in the first round.

After the season, the Knights moved from Atlanta to Quebec City and became the Quebec Rafales.

=== Quebec Rafales (1996–1998) ===
Gordon remained an assistant coach with the team through the franchise relocation, as the club hired Jean Pronovost as their head coach for the 1996–97 season. The Rafales had a solid season, going 41–30–11, earning 93 points and fourth place in the North Division. Quebec swept the Cincinnati Cyclones in the first round of the playoffs, however, they lost to the Detroit Vipers in the Turner Cup Quarter-finals.

The Rafales struggled in the 1997–98 season, failing to reach the playoffs with a 27–48–7 record, earning 61 points. After the season, the club folded.

=== Roanoke Express (1998–2000) ===
Gordon joined the Roanoke Express of the ECHL as the head coach of the team for the 1998–99 season. In his first season with the team, Gordon led them to a 38–22–10 record, earning 86 points, and first place in the Northeast Division. In the postseason, Roanoke defeated the Dayton Bombers and Chesapeake Icebreakers to reach the North Conference finals, however, they were swept by the Richmond Renegades.

Gordon led the Express to another first-place finish in the North Division in the 1999–2000 season, going 44–20–6, registering 94 points. In the postseason, the Express were upset by the Johnstown Chiefs in the first round. After the season, Roanoke did not renew Gordon's contract.

=== Providence Bruins (2000–2008) ===
Gordon joined the Providence Bruins of the American Hockey League as an assistant coach to Bill Armstrong for the 2000–01 season. In his first season with the Bruins, the team had a 35–31–10–4 record, earning 84 points and a trip to the playoffs, as the club finished in third place in the New England Division. Providence defeated the Hartford Wolf Pack and Worcester IceCats to win the division in the playoffs, however, the Bruins lost to the Saint John Flames in the Eastern Conference finals.

In 2001–02, the Bruins struggled to a 35–33–8–4 record, third in the East Division, and tenth in the Eastern Conference. Providence faced the St. John's Maple Leafs in a best-of-three qualifying series, in which they were swept in two games to be eliminated from the playoffs.

The Bruins made a head coaching change before the 2002–03, as Mike Sullivan was hired to take over for Bill Armstrong. Providence kept Gordon as an assistant coach. After the Bruins started the season 41–17–9–4 under Sullivan, he was promoted to the Boston Bruins late in the season as the team made a coaching change, and Gordon became the head coach of Providence. Gordon led Providence to a 3–3–2–1 record in their last nine games, as the club finished in first place in the North Division. In the postseason, the Bruins were upset by the Manitoba Moose in the first round.

Gordon led Providence to a 36–29–11–4 record in his first full season as the head coach in 2003–04, helping them reach the qualifying round of the playoffs. In the best-of-three qualification round, the Bruins were swept by the Portland Pirates in two games.

Providence had a solid season in 2004–05, going 40–30–7–3 to finish with 90 points, and a fourth-place finish in the Atlantic Division. The Bruins then upset the first place Manchester Monarchs in the first round of the playoffs, then defeated the Lowell Lock Monsters in the Atlantic Division finals to earn a trip to the Eastern Conference Finals. The Bruins lost to the Philadelphia Phantoms in six games.

Gordon led the Bruins to another postseason appearance in the 2005–06 season, as Providence had a 43–31–1–5 record, earning 92 points and fourth place in the Atlantic Division. In the playoffs, the Portland Pirates defeated Providence in the first round.

The Bruins had another very solid season in 2006–07, as Providence had a 44–30–2–4 record, earning 94 points and third place in the Atlantic Division. The Bruins defeated the Hartford Wolf Pack in the Division semi-finals, however, they lost to the Manchester Monarchs in the Atlantic Division finals.

Providence had a spectacular season in 2007–08, as the Bruins won the Macgregor Kilpatrick Trophy, awarded to the team who finished with the most points in the regular season. The Bruins had a 55–18–3–4 record, earning 117 points. Providence quickly swept the Manchester Monarchs in the first round of the playoffs, but the Bruins were upset by the Portland Pirates in the Atlantic Division Finals. After the season, Gordon won the Louis A.R. Pieri Memorial Award as Coach of the Year in the AHL.

On August 12, 2008, Gordon left the Bruins to become the head coach of the New York Islanders in the NHL.

=== New York Islanders (2008–2011) ===
Gordon made his NHL head coaching debut on October 10, 2008, as the Islanders lost to the New Jersey Devils, 2–1. Gordon earned his first NHL victory the next night, on October 11, 2008, as the Islanders defeated the St. Louis Blues 5–2 in his first home game. The Islanders struggled throughout the season, finishing 26–47–9, earning 61 points and last place in the Atlantic Division, missing the playoffs.

In 2009–10, the Islanders improved to a 34–37–11 record, getting 79 points, but missed the playoffs once again.

The Islanders once again struggled at the start of the 2010–11, as the club had a record of 4–10–3 in their first 17 games to quickly fall out of the playoff picture. On November 15, 2010, the Islanders fired Gordon, replacing him with Jack Capuano. He was given a job as a special advisor to general manager Garth Snow following his dismissal as head coach.

=== Toronto Maple Leafs (2011–2014) ===
On June 20, 2011, the Toronto Maple Leafs hired Gordon as an assistant coach under head coach Ron Wilson. Late in the 2011–12 season, the Maple Leafs fired Wilson as head coach, hiring Randy Carlyle as his replacement, and keeping Gordon on as an assistant. However, Gordon was later fired after the 2013–14 season.

=== Lehigh Valley Phantoms and Philadelphia Flyers (2015–2021) ===
On July 13, 2015, Gordon was named head coach of the AHL's Lehigh Valley Phantoms, the affiliate of the Philadelphia Flyers.

Gordon was named the interim head coach for the Flyers on December 17, 2018, following the firing of head coach Dave Hakstol. On April 15, 2019, the Flyers named Alain Vigneault head coach and Gordon returned as head coach of the Phantoms for the 2019–20 season.

Following the 2020–21 season, Gordon and the Flyers' organization mutually agreed to end their contract. Gordon had led the Phantoms as head coach for six seasons and a 186–121–40 record (and one tie due to a suspended game in 2021) as well as a stint as interim head coach of the Flyers with a 25–22–4 record in 2018–19.

=== San Jose Sharks (since 2022) ===
On August 12, 2022, Gordon was named as an assistant coach of the San Jose Sharks.

=== International career ===
On April 8, 2009, Gordon was named an assistant coach to Ron Wilson for the United States at the 2009 IIHF World Championship held in Switzerland by USA Hockey general manager Brian Burke. The U.S. finished in fourth place in the tournament.

Gordon joined Wilson and Burke once again as an assistant coach for the US at the 2010 Winter Olympics held in Vancouver, British Columbia, helping the United States to the silver medal.

Gordon was the head coach of the United States at the 2011 IIHF World Championship held in Slovakia. The USA struggled and finished in eighth place in the tournament.

== Personal life ==
Gordon is married to Jennifer Gordon whom he met during his years with the Atlanta Knights, and has two sons, Erik and Ryan, who play hockey as well.

== Career statistics ==
=== Regular season and playoffs ===
			Regular season									Playoffs
Season	Team	League	GP	W	L	T	MIN	GA	SO	GAA	SV%	GP	W	L	MIN	GA	SO	GAA	SV%
1982–83	Boston College	ECAC	9	3	3	0	371	15	0	2.43	—	—	—	—	—	—	—	—	—
1983–84	Boston College	ECAC	35	21	13	0	2034	127	1	3.75	—	—	—	—	—	—	—	—	—
1984–85	Boston College	ECAC	36	23	11	2	2179	131	1	3.61	.889	—	—	—	—	—	—	—	—
1985–86	Boston College	ECAC	32	17	8	1	1852	112	2	3.63	.884	—	—	—	—	—	—	—	—
1986–87	Fredericton Express	AHL	32	9	12	2	1616	120	0	4.46	.875	—	—	—	—	—	—	—	—
1987–88	Baltimore Skipjacks	AHL	34	7	17	3	1638	145	0	5.31	.861	—	—	—	—	—	—	—	—
1988–89	Halifax Citadels	AHL	2	0	2	0	116	10	0	5.17	.825	—	—	—	—	—	—	—	—
1988–89	Johnstown Chiefs	ECHL	31	18	9	3	1839	117	2	3.82	.888	11	7	4	647	36	0	3.34	—
1989–90	Quebec Nordiques	NHL	10	2	8	0	598	53	0	5.33	.856	—	—	—	—	—	—	—	—
1989–90	Halifax Citadels	AHL	48	28	16	3	2851	158	0	3.33	.887	6	2	4	340	28	0	4.94	—
1990–91	Quebec Nordiques	NHL	13	0	8	0	485	48	0	5.94	.787	—	—	—	—	—	—	—	—
1990–91	Halifax Citadels	AHL	24	12	10	2	1410	87	2	3.70	.879	—	—	—	—	—	—	—	—
1991–92	American National Team	Intl	29	13	12	3	1666	112	0	4.03	—	—	—	—	—	—	—	—	—
1991–92	Halifax Citadels	AHL	7	3	3	1	424	27	0	3.82	.886	—	—	—	—	—	—	—	—
1991–92	New Haven Nighthawks	AHL	4	3	1	0	239	11	0	2.76	.898	2	0	2	119	9	0	4.54	.882
1992–93	Nashville Knights	ECHL	23	13	9	1	1380	99	0	4.30	.889	9	5	4	548	40	0	4.38	—
1993–94	Knoxville Cherokees	ECHL	26	15	10	1	1517	98	0	3.87	.874	—	—	—	—	—	—	—	—
1993–94	Atlanta Knights	IHL	5	0	1	3	233	13	0	3.34	.888	—	—	—	—	—	—	—	—
NHL totals			23	2	16	0	1082	101	0	5.60	.829	—	—	—	—	—	—	—	—

=== International ===
Year	Team	Event	GP	W	L	T	MIN	GA	SO	GAA	SV%
1991	United States	WC	2	0	1	0	72	9	0	7.50	.818
1992	United States	OLY	1	0	0	0	17	2	0	3.53	.818
Senior totals			3	0	1	1	89	11	0	7.41	—

=== Head coaching record ===
Team	Year	Regular season							Postseason		
Team	Year	G	W	L	T	OTL	Pts	Finish	W	L	Result
Roanoke Express	1998–99	70	38	22	10	—	86	1st in Northeast	—	—	Lost in Kelly Cup Finals
Providence Bruins	2002–03	9	3	3	2	1	104	1st in North	—	—	Lost in first round
Providence Bruins	2003–04	80	36	29	11	4	87	4th in Atlantic	—	—	Lost in Division Qualifier
Providence Bruins	2004–05	80	40	30	—	10	90	4th in Atlantic	—	—	Lost in Conference Finals
Providence Bruins	2005–06	80	43	31	—	6	92	4th in Atlantic	—	—	Lost in Division Semifinals
Providence Bruins	2006–07	80	44	30	—	6	94	3rd in Atlantic	—	—	Lost in Division Finals
Providence Bruins	2007–08	80	55	18	—	7	117	1st in Atlantic	—	—	Lost in Division Finals
New York Islanders	2008–09	82	26	47	—	9	61	5th in Atlantic	—	—	Missed playoffs
New York Islanders	2009–10	82	34	37	—	11	79	5th in Atlantic	—	—	Missed playoffs
New York Islanders	2010–11	17	4	10	—	3	11	Fired	—	—	—
Lehigh Valley Phantoms	2015–16	76	34	35	—	7	75	7th in Atlantic	—	—	Did not qualify
Lehigh Valley Phantoms	2016–17	76	48	23	—	5	101	2nd in Atlantic	—	—	Lost in Division Semifinals
Lehigh Valley Phantoms	2017–18	76	47	19	—	10	104	1st in Atlantic	—	—	Lost in Conference Finals
Lehigh Valley Phantoms	2018–19	26	15	9	—	2	32	—	—		
Philadelphia Flyers	2018–19	51	25	22	—	4	54	6th in Metropolitan	—	—	Missed playoffs
Lehigh Valley Phantoms	2019–20	62	24	28	—	10	58	Season cancelled			
Lehigh Valley Phantoms	2020–21	32	18	7	1	6	43	2nd in North	—	—	No playoffs
ECHL totals		70	38	22	10	—	86	1 division title	1 playoff appearance		
AHL totals		757	407	262	14	74	997	3 division titles	8 playoff appearances		
NHL totals		232	89	116	27			—	—	—	

== Awards and honors ==
Award	Year
First Team All-Hockey East	1985–86
1st Team All-Star (ECHL)	1988-89
Top Goaltender (ECHL)	1988-89
Louis A.R. Pieri Memorial Award (AHL Coach of the Year)	2007-08

Sporting positions
Preceded by Mike Sullivan	Head coach of the Providence Bruins; 2003–2008	Succeeded by Rob Murray
Preceded by Ted Nolan	Head coach of the New York Islanders; 2008–2010	Succeeded by Jack Capuano
Preceded by Dave Hakstol	Head coach of the Philadelphia Flyers (interim); 2018–2019	Succeeded by Alain Vigneault
Awards and achievements
Preceded by Chris Terreri	Hockey East Goaltending Champion; 1985–86	Succeeded by Scott King
