= 1985 Hockey East men's ice hockey tournament =

1985 Hockey East Men's ice hockey tournament
- Dates: March 8–16, 1985
- Teams: 7
- Finals site: Providence Civic Center; Providence, Rhode Island
- Champions: Providence (1st title)
- Winning coach: Steve Stirling (1st title)
- MVP: Chris Terreri (Providence)
- Hockey East Men's Ice Hockey Tournaments

The 1985 Hockey East Men's Ice Hockey Tournament was the 1st tournament in the history of the conference. It was played between March 8 and March 16, 1985. Quarterfinal games were played at home team campus sites, while the final four games were, for the first time, played at the Providence Civic Center in Providence, Rhode Island. By winning the tournament, Providence received the Hockey East's automatic bid to the 1985 NCAA Division I Men's Ice Hockey Tournament.

== Format ==
The tournament featured three rounds of play. In the quarterfinals, the second seed and seventh seed, the third seed and sixth seeds, and the fourth seed and fifth seeds played a two-game series where an additional mini-game was played if the teams remained tied to determine the winner and advanced to the semifinals. In the semifinals, the first seed was matched against the lowest remaining quarterfinalist while the other remaining quarterfinalists met in a single-elimination game with the winners advancing to the championship game and the losers meeting in a third-place game. The tournament champion receives an automatic bid to the 1985 NCAA Division I Men's Ice Hockey Tournament.

== Conference standings ==
Note: GP = Games played; W = Wins; L = Losses; T = Ties; PTS = Points; GF = Goals For; GA = Goals Against

1984–85 Hockey East standings
	Conference							Overall					
	GP	W	L	T	PTS	GF	GA	GP	W	L	T	GF	GA
Boston College†	34	24	9	1	49	182	125	45	28	15	2	240	172
Boston University	34	19	11	4	42	139	132	42	24	14	4	170	165
Providence*	34	15	14	5	35	119	127	45	23	17	5	156	149
New Hampshire	34	12	21	1	25	139	152	43	16	26	1	198	191
Lowell	34	11	21	2	24	125	169	42	15	25	2	169	215
Northeastern	34	11	22	1	23	120	155	38	13	24	1	130	167
Maine	34	8	26	0	16	105	185	42	12	29	1	140	211
Championship: Providence † indicates conference regular season champion * indicates conference tournament champion

== Bracket ==
Teams are reseeded after the quarterfinals

Quarterfinals; March 7–10
2	Boston University	7	4	–
7	Maine	4	2	–
3	Providence	3	3	–
6	Northeastern	2	0	–
4	New Hampshire	6	8	0
5	Lowell	7	4	1

Semifinals; March 15
1	Boston College	6
5	Lowell	5
2	Boston University	2
3	Providence	5

Championship; March 16
1	Boston College	1
3	Providence	2**
Consolation
2	Boston University	6
5	Lowell	4

Note: * denotes overtime period(s)

=== Quarterfinals ===
==== (2) Boston University vs. (7) Maine ====
March 9	Boston University	7 – 4	Maine	Walter Brown Arena

March 10	Boston University	4 – 2	Maine	Walter Brown Arena

Boston University won series 2–0

==== (3) Providence vs. (6) Northeastern ====
March 10	Providence	3 – 2	Northeastern	Schneider Arena

March 11	Providence	3 – 0	Northeastern	Schneider Arena

Providence won series 2–0

==== (4) New Hampshire vs. (5) Lowell ====
March 8	New Hampshire	6 – 7	Lowell	Snively Arena

March 9	New Hampshire	8 – 4	Lowell	Snively Arena

March 9	New Hampshire	0 – 1	Lowell	Snively Arena

Lowell won series 2–1

=== Semifinals ===
==== (1) Boston College vs. (5) Lowell ====
March 15	Boston College	6 – 5	Lowell	Providence Civic Center

==== (2) Boston University vs. (3) Providence ====
March 15	Boston University	2 – 5	Providence	Providence Civic Center

=== Consolation ===
==== (2) Boston University vs. (5) Lowell ====
March 16	Boston University	6 – 4	Lowell	Providence Civic Center

=== Championship ===
==== (1) Boston College vs. (3) Providence ====
March 16	Boston College	1 – 2	2OT	Providence	Providence Civic Center

== Tournament awards ==
=== All-Tournament Team ===
- F Doug Brown (Boston College)
- F Clark Donatelli (Boston University)
- F Jon Morris (Lowell)
- D Dominic Campedelli (Boston College)
- D Peter Taglianetti (Providence)
- G Chris Terreri* (Providence)

* Tournament MVP(s)
