= Paul Midghall =

Canadian ice hockey player

- Born: Toronto, Ontario, Canada
- Height: 5 ft 10 in (178 cm)
- Weight: 170 lb (77 kg; 12 st 2 lb)
- Position: Forward
- Shot: Left
- Played for: Rensselaer
- Playing career: 1956–1959

W. Paul Midghall is a Canadian retired ice hockey forward who was a two-time All-American for Rensselaer.

== Career ==
Midghall was one of a series of players from Ontario who came to Rensselaer while Ned Harkness was head coach. He continued the tradition of lofty point totals from the moment he joined the varsity squad, leading the team in scoring in each of his three seasons. As a junior he scored 40 goals in 21 games and finished 3rd in the nation in scoring with 74 points. The Engineers had an excellent season that year but they couldn't overcome Clarkson and were left out of the NCAA Tournament.

In his senior season Midghall was team co-captain of the squad and became more of a passer, setting a program record with 49 helpers on the season. The record stood until 1984 when it was surpassed by Adam Oates, albeit in 17 more games. With the national tournament being held in Rensselaer's home building that year the Engineers were hoping to earn a return to the championship, however, they finished second in the Tri-State League for the second year in a row and were left out of the championship. Midghall ended the season as the 2nd leading scorer in the nation and earned his second consecutive All-American appearance.

Midghall was inducted into the Rensselaer Athletic Hall of Fame in 1968 and sits 6th on the program's all-time scoring list (as of 2020).

== Statistics ==
=== Regular season and playoffs ===
| | | | Regular season | | | | | Playoffs |
| Season | Team | League | GP | G | A | Pts | PIM | GP | G | A | Pts | PIM |
|---|---|---|---|---|---|---|---|---|---|---|---|---|
| 1956–57 | Rensselaer | Tri-State League | 21 | 24 | 35 | 59 | 24 | — | — | — | — | — |
| 1957–58 | Rensselaer | Tri-State League | 21 | 40 | 34 | 74 | 50 | — | — | — | — | — |
| 1958–59 | Rensselaer | Tri-State League | 21 | 29 | 49 | 78 | 44 | — | — | — | — | — |
| NCAA totals | | | 63 | 93 | 118 | 221 | 118 | — | — | — | — | — |

== Awards and honors ==
| Award | Year |
|---|---|
| AHCA East All-American | 1957–58 |
| AHCA East All-American | 1958–59 |
