= Dominic Campedelli =

American ice hockey player (born 1964)

- Born: April 3, 1964 (age 62) Cohasset, Massachusetts, U.S.
- Height: 6 ft 1 in (185 cm)
- Weight: 185 lb (84 kg; 13 st 3 lb)
- Position: Defense
- Shot: Right
- Played for: Montreal Canadiens
- NHL draft: 129th overall, 1982; Toronto Maple Leafs
- Playing career: 1985–1988

Dominic Joseph "Dom" Campedelli (born April 3, 1964) is an American retired professional ice hockey defenceman. He played two games in the National Hockey League for the Montreal Canadiens during the 1985–86 season.

== Playing career ==
Campedelli played for Cohasset High School. He was drafted in the 7th Round, 129th overall by the Toronto Maple Leafs in the 1982 NHL entry draft. Campedelli appeared in two games for the Canadiens during the 1985–86 season.

== Career statistics ==
=== Regular season and playoffs ===
			Regular season					Playoffs
Season	Team	League	GP	G	A	Pts	PIM	GP	G	A	Pts	PIM
1980–81	Cohasset High School	HS-MA	—	—	—	—	—	—	—	—	—	—
1981–82	Bridgeport Bruins	NEJHL	18	12	8	20	—	—	—	—	—	—
1981–82	Cohasset High School	HS-MA	18	11	22	33	—	—	—	—	—	—
1982–83	Boston College	ECAC	26	1	10	11	26	—	—	—	—	—
1983–84	Boston College	ECAC	37	10	19	29	24	—	—	—	—	—
1984–85	Boston College	HE	44	5	44	49	74	—	—	—	—	—
1985–86	Montreal Canadiens	NHL	2	0	0	0	0	—	—	—	—	—
1985–86	Sherbrooke Canadiens	AHL	38	4	10	14	27	—	—	—	—	—
1986–87	Sherbrooke Canadiens	AHL	7	3	2	5	2	—	—	—	—	—
1986–87	Hershey Bears	AHL	45	7	15	22	70	—	—	—	—	—
1986–87	Nova Scotia Oilers	AHL	12	0	4	4	7	5	0	0	0	17
1987–88	Nova Scotia Oilers	AHL	70	3	17	20	117	3	1	1	2	2
AHL totals			172	19	48	67	223	8	1	1	2	19
NHL totals			2	0	0	0	0	—	—	—	—	—

== Awards and honors ==
Award	Year
Hockey East All-Tournament Team	1985
