= Chris Terreri =

American ice hockey player and coach

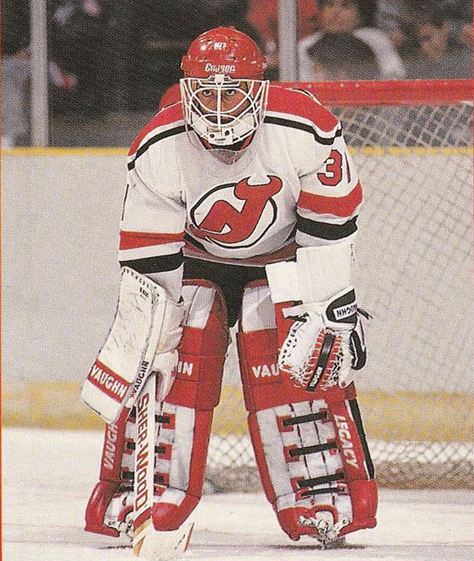
- Born: November 15, 1964 (age 61) Providence, Rhode Island, U.S.
- Height: 5 ft 9 in (175 cm)
- Weight: 155 lb (70 kg; 11 st 1 lb)
- Position: Goaltender
- Caught: Left
- Played for: New Jersey Devils; San Jose Sharks; Chicago Blackhawks; New York Islanders
- National team: United States
- NHL draft: 85th overall, 1983; New Jersey Devils
- Playing career: 1986–2001

Christopher Arnold Terreri (born November 15, 1964) is an American professional ice hockey coach and former player. He was a goaltender in the National Hockey League (NHL) for 14 seasons, playing the majority of his career with the New Jersey Devils. He also played briefly for the San Jose Sharks, Chicago Blackhawks, and New York Islanders. Terreri won two Stanley Cup championships with the Devils in 1995 and 2000. He was inducted as a charter member of the Rhode Island Hockey Hall of Fame in 2018.

== Playing career ==
Terreri was drafted by the New Jersey Devils in the fifth round (85th overall) of the 1983 NHL entry draft. He attended Providence College from 1982 to 1986, and was the MVP of the 1985 Hockey East postseason tournament following a 2–1 double-overtime victory over top-seeded Boston College at the Providence Civic Center, and the MVP of the 1985 NCAA Men's Ice Hockey Championship, despite a 2–1 loss in the championship game to RPI at Joe Louis Arena.

He is a two-time Stanley Cup Champion with New Jersey, having won his first title in 1995, and his second Cup in 2000, both times as Martin Brodeur's backup. Over his career, he played for the Devils, the San Jose Sharks, the Chicago Blackhawks and the New York Islanders. He wore a non-traditional mask.

While initially lost to the Minnesota Wild in the 2000 NHL Expansion Draft. He was re-acquired from the Minnesota Wild with Minnesota's 9th round choice (later traded to Tampa Bay - Thomas Ziegler) in the 2000 Entry Draft for Brad Bombardir.

== Coaching career ==
In 2001, he became an assistant coach of the Albany River Rats, the New Jersey Devils' farm team. During the 2005–06 season, Terreri made his return to professional ice hockey against the Hershey Bears where, in two periods, he made 27 saves and allowed four goals. It was the two-time Stanley Cup winner's first action since the 2000–01 season, when he played for the New York Islanders.

On July 8, 2017, Terreri was relieved from his duties as goaltending coach for the New Jersey Devils. On August 23, 2017, Terreri was hired by the New York Islanders as a goaltending development coach.

== Personal life ==
Terreri was born in Providence, Rhode Island, and was raised in nearby Warwick.

Terreri and his wife Jennifer have two children, Celia Rose and Jillian Jayne.

== Awards and honors ==
Award	Year
All-Hockey East First Team	1984–85
AHCA East First-Team All-American	1984–85
Hockey East All-Tournament Team	1985
NCAA All-Tournament Team	1985
AHCA East Second-Team All-American	1985–86
2x Stanley Cup champion	1995, 2000

== Career statistics ==
=== Regular season and playoffs ===
			Regular season									Playoffs
Season	Team	League	GP	W	L	T	MIN	GA	SO	GAA	SV%	GP	W	L	MIN	GA	SO	GAA	SV%
1981–82	Pilgrim High School	HS-RI	—	—	—	—	—	—	—	—	—	—	—	—	—	—	—	—	—
1982–83	Providence College	ECAC	11	7	1	0	528	17	2	1.93	—	—	—	—	—	—	—	—	—
1983–84	Providence College	ECAC	10	4	2	0	391	20	0	3.07	—	—	—	—	—	—	—	—	—
1984–85	Providence College	HE	33	15	13	5	1956	116	1	3.56	—	—	—	—	—	—	—	—	—
1985–86	Providence College	HE	22	6	16	0	1320	84	0	3.82	—	—	—	—	—	—	—	—	—
1986–87	New Jersey Devils	NHL	7	0	3	1	286	21	0	4.41	.879	—	—	—	—	—	—	—	—
1986–87	Maine Mariners	AHL	14	4	9	1	765	57	0	4.47	.866	—	—	—	—	—	—	—	—
1987–88	United States National Team	Intl	26	17	7	2	1430	81	0	3.40	—	—	—	—	—	—	—	—	—
1987–88	Utica Devils	AHL	7	5	1	0	399	18	0	2.71	.910	—	—	—	—	—	—	—	—
1988–89	New Jersey Devils	NHL	8	0	4	2	402	18	0	2.69	.894	—	—	—	—	—	—	—	—
1988–89	Utica Devils	AHL	39	20	15	3	2314	132	0	3.42	.883	2	0	1	80	6	0	4.50	—
1989–90	New Jersey Devils	NHL	35	15	12	3	1931	110	0	3.42	.890	4	2	2	238	13	0	3.28	.874
1990–91	New Jersey Devils	NHL	53	24	21	7	2970	144	1	2.91	.893	7	3	4	428	21	0	2.94	.903
1991–92	New Jersey Devils	NHL	54	22	22	10	3186	169	1	3.18	.888	7	3	3	386	23	0	3.58	.887
1992–93	New Jersey Devils	NHL	48	19	21	3	2672	151	2	3.39	.886	4	1	3	219	17	0	4.66	.856
1993–94	New Jersey Devils	NHL	44	20	11	4	2340	106	2	2.72	.907	4	3	0	200	9	0	2.70	.919
1994–95	New Jersey Devils	NHL	15	3	7	2	734	31	0	2.53	.900	1	0	0	8	0	0	0.00	1.000
1995–96	New Jersey Devils	NHL	4	3	0	0	210	9	0	2.57	.902	—	—	—	—	—	—	—	—
1995–96	San Jose Sharks	NHL	46	13	29	1	2516	155	0	3.70	.883	—	—	—	—	—	—	—	—
1996–97	San Jose Sharks	NHL	22	6	10	3	1200	55	0	2.75	.901	—	—	—	—	—	—	—	—
1996–97	Chicago Blackhawks	NHL	7	4	1	2	429	19	0	2.66	.901	2	0	0	44	3	0	4.09	.893
1997–98	Chicago Blackhawks	NHL	21	8	10	2	1222	49	2	2.41	.906	—	—	—	—	—	—	—	—
1997–98	Indianapolis Ice	IHL	3	2	0	1	180	3	1	1.00	.972	—	—	—	—	—	—	—	—
1998–99	New Jersey Devils	NHL	12	8	3	1	726	30	1	2.48	.898	—	—	—	—	—	—	—	—
1999–00	New Jersey Devils	NHL	12	2	9	0	649	37	0	3.42	.876	—	—	—	—	—	—	—	—
2000–01	New Jersey Devils	NHL	10	2	5	1	453	21	0	2.78	.874	—	—	—	—	—	—	—	—
2000–01	New York Islanders	NHL	8	2	4	1	443	18	0	2.44	.912	—	—	—	—	—	—	—	—
2005–06	Albany River Rats	AHL	1	0	1	—	40	4	0	6.05	.871	—	—	—	—	—	—	—	—
NHL totals			406	151	172	43	22,369	1143	9	3.07	.892	29	12	12	1523	86	0	3.39	.890

=== International ===
Year	Team	Event	GP	W	L	T	MIN	GA	SO	GAA
1985	United States	WC	3	—	—	—	111	12	0	6.49
1986	United States	WC	5	—	—	—	286	20	1	4.20
1987	United States	WC	2	—	—	—	100	12	0	7.20
1988	United States	OG	3	1	1	0	127	14	0	6.61
1997	United States	WC	6	2	3	1	357	16	0	2.69
Senior totals			19	—	—	—	981	74	1	4.53

Awards and achievements
Preceded by Award created	Hockey East Player of the Year; 1984–85	Succeeded by Scott Harlow
Preceded by Award created	Hockey East Goaltending Champion; 1984–85	Succeeded by Scott Gordon
Preceded by Award created	William Flynn Tournament Most Valuable Player; 1985	Succeeded by Peter Marshall
Preceded by Gary Kruzich	NCAA Tournament Most Outstanding Player; 1985	Succeeded by Mike Donnelly
