= Mike Addesa =

American ice hockey coach (1945–2022)

Biographical details
- Born: January 8, 1945; West Roxbury, Massachusetts, U.S.
- Died: November 29, 2022 (aged 77)

Coaching career (HC unless noted)
- 1966–1967: Stoneham HS (asst.)
- 1967–1968: St. Mary's HS
- 1968–1973: Randolph HS
- 1973–1974: Wellesley HS
- 1974–1976: Holy Cross (asst.)
- 1976–1979: Holy Cross
- 1979–1989: Rensselaer
- 1989–1990: Notre Dame Hounds (GM)
- 1990–1995: Detroit Red Wings (scout)
- 1995–2012: Boston Bulldogs (HC/GM/Owner)
- 2011–2013: Calgary Flames (scout)
- 2015–2017: Vancouver Canucks (scout)
- 2015–2017: Seacoast Spartans (GM)

Head coaching record
- Overall: 236–155–9 (.601) [College]
- Tournaments: 3–2–1 (.583)

Accomplishments and honors

Awards
- First-team All-East (1965)

Michael John Addesa Jr. (January 8, 1945 – November 29, 2022) was an American ice hockey coach and football player. Addesa was the head coach of the Rensselaer Polytechnic Institute men's ice hockey team from 1979 to 1989. Addesa played collegiate football at Holy Cross.

== Coaching career ==
In 1974, Addesa became an assistant ice hockey coach at Holy Cross. He was elevated to head coach in 1976 and stayed in that position until the end of the 1978–1979 season, when he was hired by Rensselaer Polytechnic Institute.

Addesa was hired by RPI to replace Jim Salfi who had coached the team from 1972 to 1979.

In his 10 years with RPI, Mike Addesa won one NCAA Division I Men's Ice Hockey Championship in 1985 and two ECAC Division I Men's Ice Hockey Championships in 1984 and 1985.

Addesa was forced to resign as head coach at RPI in 1989 due to philosophical differences, stemming from the controversy over accusations of making racist comments towards one of two black players on his team, one of whom was future NHL player Graeme Townshend: "If you don’t put forth a greater effort, the world will only see you as a stereotypical nigger.” He has apologized for the comments. Townshend accepted the apology, and has voiced 100% support for Addesa from the beginning. Townshend has stated that his relationship with Addesa was unlike any player/coach relationship he had ever experienced, and that Addesa went above and beyond the job of just being a coach. Townshend viewed their relationship as being closer to a father/son thing. "I loved the guy.” Addesa would later go on to say that he had not meant the comments "racially" and to describe his firing from RPI as a "scam" which had made it impossible for him to continue coaching.

== Post-coaching career ==
After his departure from RPI, Addesa served as the chairperson of the Committee to Bring Pro Hockey to Albany, which was formed in May 1989 by Albany County Executive Jim Coyne with the objective of bringing a prospective team to the Knickerbocker Arena, using RPI's Houston Field House as an interim rink prior to the opening of the new venue in Albany. He resigned from the position in January 1990 and began working with Mike Cantanucci to place an American Hockey League team in Troy, resulting in the establishment of the Capital District Islanders for the 1990–1991 season.

Addesa worked as a scout for the Detroit Red Wings of the National Hockey League from 1990 to 1995 and the Calgary Flames from 2011 to 2013. On August 4, 2015, Addesa was named as a scout for the Vancouver Canucks of the National Hockey League.

== Personal life and death ==
Addesa died peacefully, surrounded by loved ones, on November 29, 2022, at the age of 77 from natural causes.

== Head coaching record ==
Record table
Season	Team	Overall	Conference	Standing	Postseason
Holy Cross Crusaders (ECAC 2) (1976–1979)
1976–77	Holy Cross	15–12–0	10–12–0	16th	
1977–78	Holy Cross	17–9–0	14–7–0	T–8th	ECAC 2 East Quarterfinals
1978–79	Holy Cross	18–10–0	14–9–0	10th	ECAC 2 East Quarterfinals
Holy Cross:		50–31–0	38–28–0		
Rensselaer Engineers (ECAC Hockey) (1979–1989)
1979–80	Rensselaer	16–11–0	14–8–0	6th	ECAC Quarterfinals
1980–81	Rensselaer	16–13–0	10–11–0	t–10th	
1981–82	Rensselaer	9–18–2	6–12–2	14th	
1982–83	Rensselaer	18–11–0	13–7–0	7th	ECAC Quarterfinals
1983–84	Rensselaer	32–6–0	17–3–0	1st	NCAA Quarterfinals
1984–85	Rensselaer	35–2–1	20–1–0	1st	NCAA Champion
1985–86	Rensselaer	20–11–1	13–7–1	4th	ECAC Quarterfinals
1986–87	Rensselaer	13–18–2	9–13–0	T-7th	ECAC Third Place Game (Tie)
1987–88	Rensselaer	15–17–0	9–13–0	8th	ECAC Quarterfinals
1988–89	Rensselaer	12–17–3	8–12–2	8th	ECAC Quarterfinals
Rensselaer:		186–124–9	119–87–5		
Total:		236–155–9			
National champion Postseason invitational champion Conference regular season champion Conference regular season and conference tournament champion Division regular season champion Division regular season and conference tournament champion Conference tournament champion
