= Josh Jooris =

Canadian ice hockey player (born 1990)

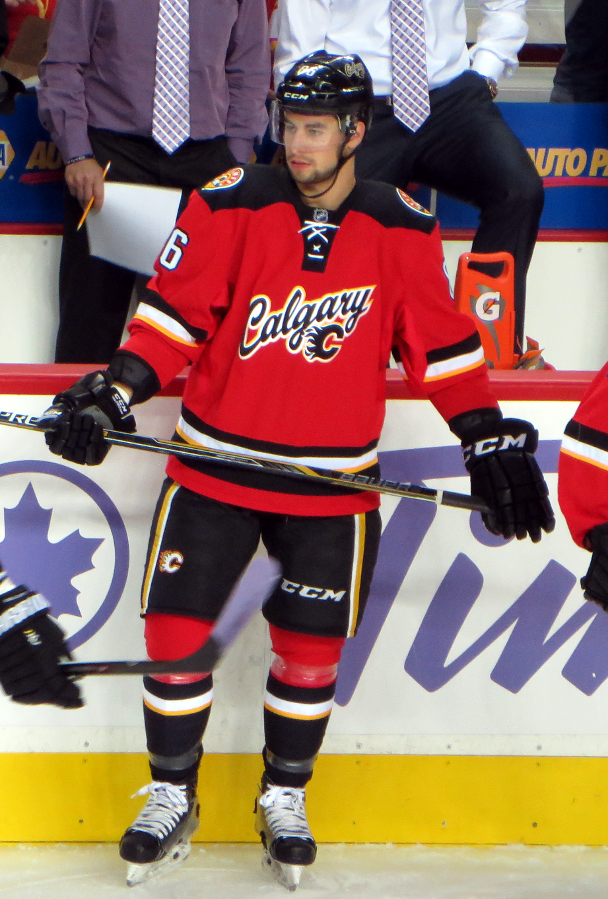
- Jooris with the Calgary Flames in 2014
- Born: July 14, 1990 (age 36) Burlington, Ontario, Canada
- Height: 6 ft 1 in (185 cm)
- Weight: 197 lb (89 kg; 14 st 1 lb)
- Position: Centre
- Shoots: Right
- NL team Former teams: Genève-Servette HC; Calgary Flames; New York Rangers; Arizona Coyotes; Carolina Hurricanes; Pittsburgh Penguins; Lausanne HC
- NHL draft: Undrafted
- Playing career: 2013–present

Joshua Jooris (born July 14, 1990) is a Canadian professional ice hockey centre currently playing for Genève-Servette HC of the National League (NL). An undrafted player, Jooris signed with the Calgary Flames organization in 2013 after playing three seasons of college hockey for the Union College Dutchmen. He holds a Swiss player-license as he made his junior debut in Switzerland.

== Playing career ==
A native of Burlington, Ontario, Jooris played two seasons of junior A hockey for the Burlington Cougars between 2009 and 2011 before committing to play college hockey at Union College for the Union Dutchmen program in the East Coast Athletic Conference (ECAC). He played three seasons with the Dutchmen and, as an undrafted player, tried out for three different National Hockey League (NHL) teams. He attended camp for the Boston Bruins in 2011, and in 2012 for the Vancouver Canucks. In his third attempt, in 2013, he successfully earned a contract with the Calgary Flames and turned professional. The Flames assigned him to their American Hockey League (AHL) affiliate, the Abbotsford Heat for the 2013–14 season. He appeared in 73 games for the Heat, scored 11 goals and added 16 assists.

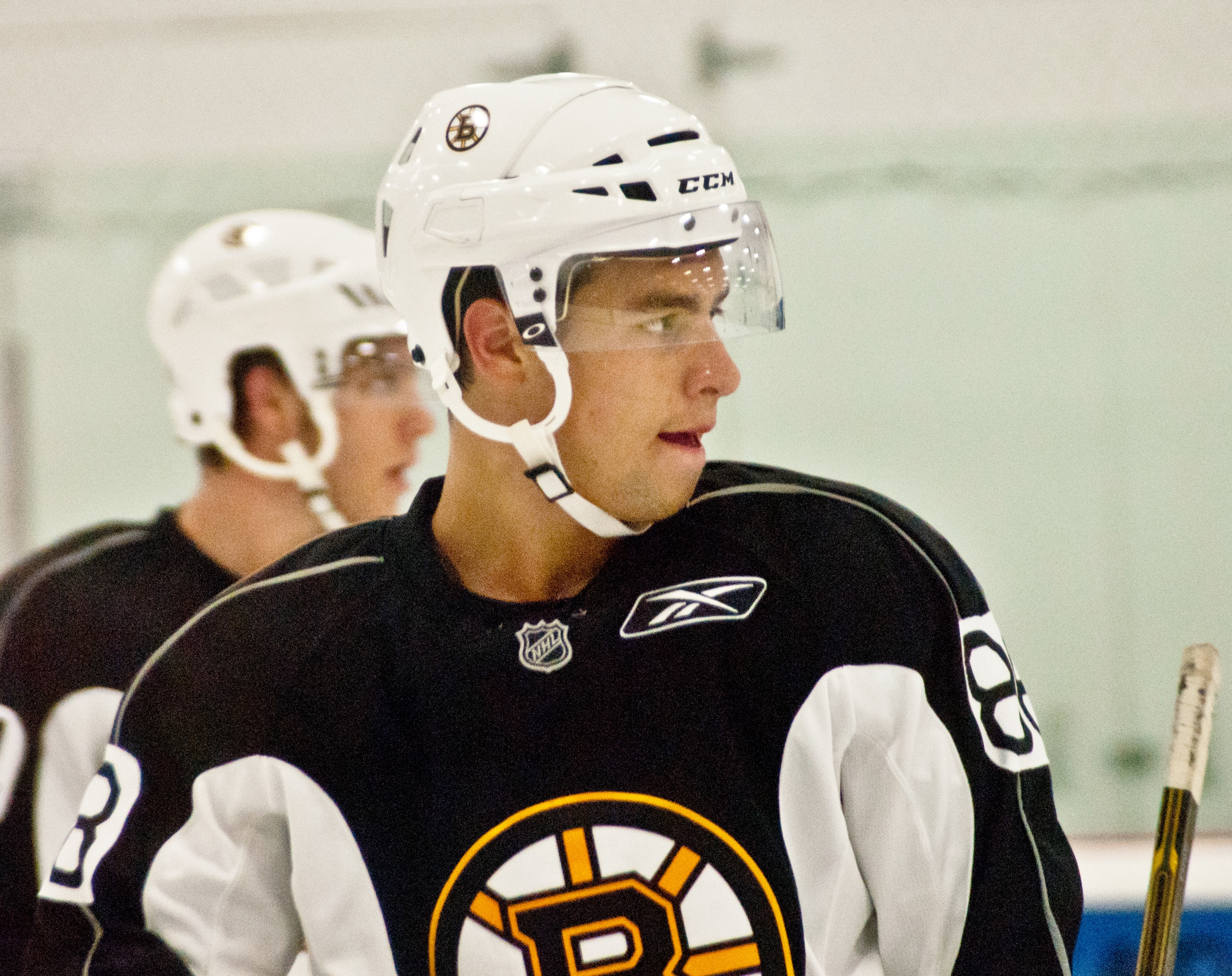
Jooris at the Boston Bruins' 2011 development camp.

Entering his second professional season, Jooris impressed the Flames coaching staff with his play during the pre-season; he scored three goals in six games and was praised for his defensive play. However, he was one of the final players cut from the roster prior to the 2014–15 season and was assigned to Calgary's AHL affiliate, which had relocated to become the Adirondack Flames. An injury to David Jones less than two weeks into the season led to Jooris' first recall to Calgary on October 16, 2014. He made his NHL debut the following night, and scored his first goal against goaltender Sergei Bobrovsky, in a 3–2 loss against the Columbus Blue Jackets.

Following the 2014–15 season Jooris became a restricted free agent under the NHL Collective Bargaining Agreement. The Flames made him a qualifying offer to retain his NHL rights and, on July 5, 2015, Jooris filed for Salary Arbitration.

Jooris was not retained by the Flames following an unproductive 2015–16 season, and as a free agent on July 15, 2016, he agreed to a one-year, two-way contract with the New York Rangers. In the 2016–17 season, Jooris made the Rangers opening night roster. Having been limited to 12 games with the Rangers, on December 10, 2016, Jooris was placed on waivers due to the club's strong forward depth. A day later on December 11, he was claimed off waivers by the Arizona Coyotes. Jooris remained with the club to play out the season, scoring 3 goals and 10 points in 42 games.

On June 26, 2017, Jooris was not tendered a qualifying offer as a restricted free agent from the Coyotes, releasing him to free agency. On July 1, 2017, Jooris signed a one-year, $775,000 contract with the Carolina Hurricanes. On February 8, 2018, the Hurricanes placed Jooris on waivers. On February 26, 2018, Jooris was traded to the Pittsburgh Penguins in exchange for Greg McKegg. He was then assigned to continue in the AHL with the Penguins affiliate, the Wilkes-Barre/Scranton Penguins. He was called up to play with the Pittsburgh Penguins for the first time on March 8, 2018, and was reassigned to the AHL two games later on March 14.

On July 1, 2018, Jooris joined his sixth NHL organization in agreeing to a one-year, two-way contract with the Toronto Maple Leafs. After attending the Maple Leafs training camp, Jooris was unable to make the opening night roster and was assigned to start the 2018–19 season with AHL affiliate, the Toronto Marlies. As a fixture on the Marlies third line, Jooris featured in 74 games to record 8 goals and 15 points. He notched 2 assist in 13 playoff games before suffering defeat in the Eastern Conference Finals to the Charlotte Checkers.

As an impending free agent from the Maple Leafs, on June 7, 2019, Jooris opted to follow his fathers' footsteps and pursue a career in Europe, signing a three-year contract through the end of the 2021-22 season with Swiss club, Lausanne HC of the NL, revealed to be the club where he first played junior hockey during his fathers' tenure with the club.

On September 10, 2021, Jooris was shipped to Lausanne's biggest rival, Genève-Servette HC, for the remainder of his contract.

== Personal life ==
Jooris' father Mark was a longtime hockey player whose career included several years seasons in the AHL and in Europe. At the time of his son's first NHL recall, the 50-year-old Mark Jooris continued to play senior hockey in Ontario. Josh's mother is JoAnn and he has a sister, Alexa.

Before Jooris' trade, Jooris was housemates with teammate Johnny Gaudreau.

== Career statistics ==
			Regular season					Playoffs
Season	Team	League	GP	G	A	Pts	PIM	GP	G	A	Pts	PIM
2008–09	Burlington Cougars	OPJAHL	42	8	26	34	36	8	1	7	8	12
2009–10	Burlington Cougars	CCHL	50	26	90	116	42	12	5	10	15	10
2010–11	Union Dutchmen	ECAC	40	9	23	32	18	—	—	—	—	—
2011–12	Union Dutchmen	ECAC	38	8	20	28	30	—	—	—	—	—
2012–13	Union Dutchmen	ECAC	39	12	16	28	46	—	—	—	—	—
2013–14	Abbotsford Heat	AHL	73	11	16	27	67	1	0	0	0	2
2014–15	Adirondack Flames	AHL	2	0	0	0	0	—	—	—	—	—
2014–15	Calgary Flames	NHL	60	12	12	24	16	9	0	0	0	4
2015–16	Calgary Flames	NHL	59	4	9	13	39	—	—	—	—	—
2016–17	New York Rangers	NHL	12	1	1	2	6	—	—	—	—	—
2016–17	Arizona Coyotes	NHL	42	3	7	10	10	—	—	—	—	—
2017–18	Carolina Hurricanes	NHL	31	3	3	6	16	—	—	—	—	—
2017–18	Charlotte Checkers	AHL	5	0	3	3	2	—	—	—	—	—
2017–18	Wilkes-Barre/Scranton Penguins	AHL	6	1	0	1	4	3	0	1	1	0
2017–18	Pittsburgh Penguins	NHL	9	0	0	0	0	—	—	—	—	—
2018–19	Toronto Marlies	AHL	74	8	7	15	28	13	0	2	2	0
2019–20	Lausanne HC	NL	46	12	18	30	22	—	—	—	—	—
2020–21	Lausanne HC	NL	32	4	11	15	22	6	0	0	0	2
2021–22	Genève-Servette HC	NL	48	10	15	25	16	2	0	0	0	2
NHL totals			213	23	32	55	87	9	0	0	0	4
NL totals			126	26	44	70	60	8	0	0	0	4
