= Scott Harlow =

American ice hockey player (born 1963)

- Born: October 11, 1963 (age 63) East Bridgewater, Massachusetts, U.S.
- Height: 6 ft 1 in (185 cm)
- Weight: 185 lb (84 kg; 13 st 3 lb)
- Position: Left Wing
- Shot: Right
- Played for: St. Louis Blues
- NHL draft: 61st overall, 1982; Montreal Canadiens
- Playing career: 1986–1992 Coaching career

Biographical details
- Education: Boston College

Coaching career (HC unless noted)
- 2000–2007: Stonehill

Scott Christopher Harlow (born October 11, 1963) is an American retired professional ice hockey left winger who played one game in the NHL with the St. Louis Blues during the 1987–88 NHL season. Harlow was selected in the 3rd round (61st overall) of the 1982 NHL entry draft by the Montreal Canadiens.

He also played in the AHL, IHL, and later in the BHL. He is currently the amateur scout of the Boston area of the Edmonton Oilers.

== Awards and honors ==
Award	Year
All-Hockey East Second Team	1984–85
All-Hockey East First Team	1985–86
AHCA East First-Team All-American	1985–86

== Head coaching record ==
Record table
Season	Team	Overall	Conference	Standing	Postseason
Stonehill Chieftains (ECAC Northeast) (2000–2002)
2000–01	Stonehill	10–11–1	9–8–0	9th	Northeast-10 Semifinals
2001–02	Stonehill	14–11–0	7–8–0	T–9th	Northeast-10 Semifinals
Stonehill (ECAC Northeast) (2002–2005)
2002–03	Stonehill	11–13–0	8–8–0	T–8th	Northeast-10 Quarterfinals
2003–04	Stonehill	10–11–1	8–7–1	T–6th	Northeast-10 Semifinals
2004–05	Stonehill	8–15–0	4–11–0	12th	Northeast-10 Semifinals
Stonehill Skyhawks (ECAC Northeast) (2005–2007)
2005–06	Stonehill	14–10–0	8–7–0	T–7th	Northeast-10 Semifinals
2006–07	Stonehill	14–12–1	6–8–1	T–10th	Northeast-10 Champion
Stonehill:		81–83–3	50–57–2		
Total:		81–83–3			
National champion Postseason invitational champion Conference regular season champion Conference regular season and conference tournament champion Division regular season champion Division regular season and conference tournament champion Conference tournament champion

== See also ==
- List of players who played only one game in the NHL

Awards and achievements
Preceded by Chris Terreri	Hockey East Player of the Year; 1985–86	Succeeded by Brian Leetch
Preceded by Tim Army	Hockey East Scoring Champion; 1985–86	Succeeded by Craig Janney
