= Tim Friday =

American ice hockey player (born 1961)

- Born: March 5, 1961 (age 65) Burbank, California, U.S.
- Height: 6 ft 0 in (183 cm)
- Weight: 183 lb (83 kg; 13 st 1 lb)
- Position: Defense
- Shot: Right
- Played for: Detroit Red Wings
- NHL draft: undrafted
- Playing career: 1985–1986

Timothy J. Friday (born March 5, 1961) is an American retired ice hockey defenseman. He played in 23 games in the National Hockey League with the Detroit Red Wings during the 1985–86 season. Friday was on two championship teams, the RPI Engineers in the NCAA and the Adirondack Red Wings of the American Hockey League.

== Professional career ==
=== Minor league hockey ===
Although he was born in California, Friday grew up in Framingham, Massachusetts. After graduating from Marian High School in 1979, where he was a star player, Friday decided to attend Rensselaer Polytechnic Institute and join their Division I ice hockey team, the Engineers. He was known for being a responsible defenseman in his own end of the ice and for finding the space for a quick pass up to the forwards. He played for the Engineers all four years he was at R.P.I. and helped lead them to an NCAA Championship in 1985. Friday posted his best numbers in 1985, amassing 34 points in 36 games.

=== Reaching the NHL ===
After the celebration at Rensselaer settled down, the celebration for Friday continued when the Detroit Red Wings signed him as a free agent on May 27, 1985. However, the celebration would be short-lived. After playing 23 games for Detroit, Friday was involved in a collision during a game against the Philadelphia Flyers on Dec 3, 1985. He injured his shoulder in the hit, but wanted to continue playing.

Detroit sent him down to their minor league affiliate the Adirondack Red Wings for the remainder of the 1985–86 season. There, Friday again found his form and contributed 33 points in the remaining 43 games, and in the playoffs recorded six assists as Adirondack won their second American Hockey League championship in six games over the Hershey Bears. However, Friday never let on at any time during the season that his shoulder was getting worse and after winning the Calder Cup, decided to retire, barring further injury.

== After hockey ==
Currently Friday is owner of Water Street Wine & Spirits in Framingham, Massachusetts.

== Career statistics ==
=== Regular season and playoffs ===
			Regular season					Playoffs
Season	Team	League	GP	G	A	Pts	PIM	GP	G	A	Pts	PIM
1979–80	The Hill School	HS-PA	—	—	—	—	—	—	—	—	—	—
1981–82	Rensselaer Polytechnic Institute	ECAC	25	2	12	14	10	—	—	—	—	—
1982–83	Rensselaer Polytechnic Institute	ECAC	28	3	16	19	10	—	—	—	—	—
1983–84	Rensselaer Polytechnic Institute	ECAC	32	4	14	18	22	—	—	—	—	—
1984–85	Rensselaer Polytechnic Institute	ECAC	36	5	29	34	26	—	—	—	—	—
1985–86	Detroit Red Wings	NHL	23	0	3	3	6	—	—	—	—	—
1985–86	Adirondack Red Wings	AHL	43	2	31	33	23	16	0	6	6	6
NHL totals			23	0	3	3	6	—	—	—	—	—

== Awards and honors ==
Award	Year
All-NCAA All-Tournament Team	1985
