= George Servinis =

Canadian ice hockey player

- Born: April 29, 1962 (age 62); Toronto, Ontario, Canada
- Height: 5 ft 11 in (180 cm)
- Weight: 180 lb (82 kg; 12 st 12 lb)
- Position: Left wing
- Shot: Left
- Played for: Minnesota North Stars; Villacher SV
- National team: Canada
- NHL draft: Undrafted
- Playing career: 1985–1989

George Servinis (born April 29, 1962) is a Canadian former professional ice hockey player who played five games in the National Hockey League (NHL) with the Minnesota North Stars during the 1987–88 season. The rest of his career, which lasted from 1985 to 1989, was spent in the minor leagues and followed by one season in the Austrian Hockey League.

== Career statistics ==
=== Regular season and playoffs ===
			Regular season					Playoffs
Season	Team	League	GP	G	A	Pts	PIM	GP	G	A	Pts	PIM
1979–80	Wexford Warriors	MetJBHL	32	17	22	39	60	—	—	—	—	—
1979–80	Wexford Raiders	OPJHL	16	2	12	14	4	—	—	—	—	—
1980–81	Wexford Raiders	OPJHL	42	29	35	64	92	—	—	—	—	—
1981–82	Aurora Tigers	OPJHL	55	62	55	117	—	—	—	—	—	—
1982–83	Rensselaer Polytechnic Institute	ECAC	28	35	29	64	22	—	—	—	—	—
1983–84	Rensselaer Polytechnic Institute	ECAC	12	5	13	18	14	—	—	—	—	—
1983–84	Canadian National Team	Intl	43	13	11	24	33	—	—	—	—	—
1984–85	Rensselaer Polytechnic Institute	ECAC	35	34	25	59	44	—	—	—	—	—
1985–86	Springfield Indians	AHL	30	2	14	16	19	—	—	—	—	—
1986–87	Indianapolis Checkers	IHL	70	41	54	95	54	—	—	—	—	—
1987–88	Kalamazoo Wings	IHL	49	34	21	55	54	6	3	1	4	2
1987–88	Minnesota North Stars	NHL	5	0	0	0	0	—	—	—	—	—
1988–89	Villacher SV	AUT	37	32	35	67	—	—	—	—	—	—
IHL totals			119	75	75	150	108	6	3	1	4	2
NHL totals			5	0	0	0	0	—	—	—	—	—

== Awards and honors ==
Award	Year
All-NCAA All-Tournament Team	1985

Awards and achievements
Preceded by Normand Lacombe	ECAC Hockey Rookie of the Year; 1982–83	Succeeded by John Cullen
