= Mark Jooris =

Canadian ice hockey player and coach

- Born: February 3, 1964 (age 62) Burlington, Ontario, Canada
- Height: 5 ft 10 in (178 cm)
- Weight: 176 lb (80 kg; 12 st 8 lb)
- Position: Forward
- Shot: Right
- Played for: AHL; Nova Scotia Oilers; Springfield Indians; SM-liiga; Porin Ässät; DEL; Eisbaren Berlin; SC Riessersee; Hannover Scorpions; Revierlowen Oberhausen; NLA; SC Rapperswil-Jona
- National team: Canada
- NHL draft: Undrafted
- Playing career: 1986–1999

Mark Jooris (born February 3, 1964) is a Canadian ice hockey coach and former professional player. He is currently the head coach & general manager of the Burlington Cougars of the OJHL with previous experience with the 2011-12 Markham Waxers of the Ontario Junior Hockey League.

Jooris attended Rensselaer Polytechnic Institute where he played four years (1982 - 1986) of NCAA hockey with the RPI Engineers, scoring 84 goals and 99 assists for 183 points, while earning 70 penalty minutes, in 117 games played.

Jooris went on to play 13 seasons of professional hockey, including stints in the Finnish Elite League, the American Hockey League, the German DEL and the Swiss National League A and National League B.

At the end of his professional playing career, Jooris turned to coaching. Jooris served as player-coach for the amateur senior team Dundas Real McCoys from 2001 to 2007 before becoming an assistant coach for HC Sierre in the Swiss National League B in 2007–08. He then served as an assistant scout with the St. Louis Blues of the National Hockey League during the 2008–09 season. Jooris left St. Louis for the Ontario Junior Hockey League to become head coach and general manager of the Burlington Cougars for the 2009-10 season and head coach of the Oakville Blades and Markham Waxers in 2010–11 and 2011–12, respectively, while playing occasionally for the Dundas Real McCoys again.

== Career statistics ==
			Regular season					Playoffs
Season	Team	League	GP	G	A	Pts	PIM	GP	G	A	Pts	PIM
1982–83	RPI Engineers	ECAC	28	17	26	43	8	—	—	—	—	—
1983–84	RPI Engineers	ECAC	23	10	10	20	4	—	—	—	—	—
1984–85	RPI Engineers	ECAC	35	23	37	60	22	—	—	—	—	—
1985–86	RPI Engineers	ECAC	31	34	26	60	36	—	—	—	—	—
1985–86	Canadian National Team	Intl	6	0	4	4	2	—	—	—	—	—
1986–87	Ässät	SM-liiga	27	12	24	36	60	—	—	—	—	—
1987–88	Ässät	SM-liiga	42	29	34	63	62	—	—	—	—	—
1987–88	Springfield Indians	AHL	8	2	1	3	6	—	—	—	—	—
1987–88	Nova Scotia Oilers	AHL	2	3	5	8	4	5	1	4	5	6
1988–89	Canadian National Team	Intl	52	24	13	37	14	—	—	—	—	—
1988–89	HC Sierre	NLB	7	7	7	14	6	9	10	18	28	4
1989–90	Eintracht Frankfurt	Bundesliga	34	25	33	58	36	3	2	1	3	4
1990–91	Eintracht Frankfurt	Bundesliga	44	32	66	98	58	3	0	2	2	4
1991–92	EHC Dynamo Berlin	2.Bundesliga	50	54	69	123	64	—	—	—	—	—
1992–93	Düsseldorfer EG	Bundesliga	12	3	14	17	2	—	—	—	—	—
1992–93	Eisbaren Berlin	Bundesliga	20	12	10	22	4	—	—	—	—	—
1993–94	Eisbaren Berlin	Bundesliga	10	2	3	5	2	—	—	—	—	—
1994–95	Eisbaren Berlin	DEL	10	2	3	5	2	—	—	—	—	—
1994–95	SC Rapperswil-Jona	NLA	—	—	—	—	—	3	2	3	5	6
1995–96	SC Riessersee	DEL	46	16	39	55	22	3	1	3	4	0
1996–97	Hannover Scorpions	DEL	49	30	49	79	61	8	2	9	11	6
1997–98	Revierlowen Oberhausen	DEL	16	3	5	8	2	—	—	—	—	—
1997–98	Lausanne HC	NLB	26	23	27	50	18	4	2	2	4	6
1998–99	SC Rapperswil-Jona	NLA	2	1	1	2	2	—	—	—	—	—
1998–99	Geneve-Servette HC	NLB	40	23	59	82	72	—	—	—	—	—
2001–02	Dundas Real McCoys	OHA Sr.	28	32	80	112	30	—	—	—	—	—
2002–03	Dundas Real McCoys	MLH	25	15	48	63	29	—	—	—	—	—
2003–04	Dundas Real McCoys	MLH	20	10	18	28	18	—	—	—	—	—
2004–05	Dundas Real McCoys	MLH	25	24	49	73	19	—	—	—	—	—
2005–06	Dundas Real McCoys	MLH	25	16	47	63	40	13	9	17	26	12
2006–07	Dundas Real McCoys	MLH	21	14	34	48	46	—	—	—	—	—
2009–10	Dundas Real McCoys	MLH	2	1	2	3	4	4	1	5	6	6
2010–11	Dundas Real McCoys	MLH	1	0	2	2	0	3	1	4	5	6
2011–12	Dundas Real McCoys	ACH	1	0	0	0	0	3	0	2	2	6
2012–13	Dundas Real McCoys	ACH	7	3	7	10	6	6	1	2	3	12

== Family ==
His son, Joshua (born July 14, 1990), is a professional hockey player formerly with the Calgary Flames organization. He is now a member of the Carolina Hurricanes organization.
