= Daren Puppa =

Canadian ice hockey goaltender

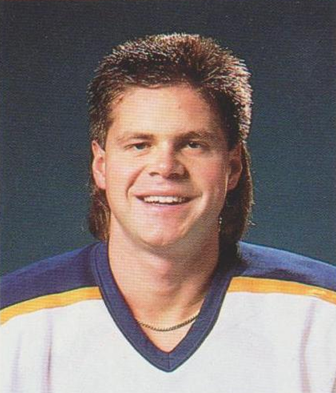
- Puppa in 1988
- Born: March 23, 1965 (age 61) Kirkland Lake, Ontario, Canada
- Height: 6 ft 4 in (193 cm)
- Weight: 205 lb (93 kg; 14 st 9 lb)
- Position: Goaltender
- Caught: Right
- Played for: Buffalo Sabres; Toronto Maple Leafs; Tampa Bay Lightning
- NHL draft: 74th overall, 1983; Buffalo Sabres
- Playing career: 1985–2000
- Website: DarenPuppa.com

Daren James Puppa (born March 23, 1965) is a Canadian former professional ice hockey goaltender in the NHL. During his career, he played for the Buffalo Sabres, Tampa Bay Lightning, and the Toronto Maple Leafs. He won the Calder Cup with the Rochester Americans in 1987. He won the 1985 NCAA Championship with the RPI Engineers. He is the cousin of NHL hockey player Ralph Backstrom.

== Career biography ==
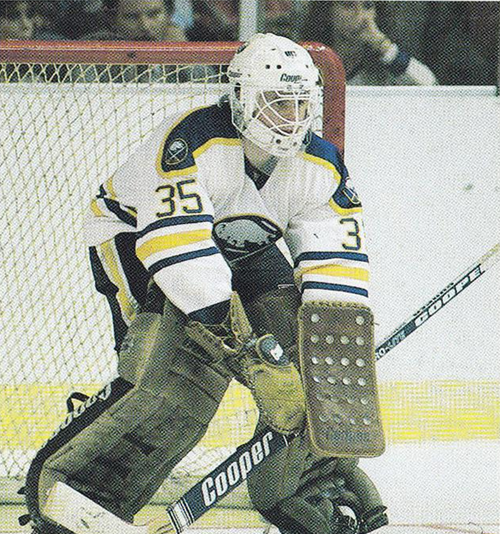
Puppa with the Buffalo Sabres in 1985

Puppa was born in Kirkland Lake, Ontario. Beginning the start of the 1982-83 season, he played for the Kirkland Blue Devils. After the season finished, he was drafted in the summer of 1983 by the Buffalo Sabres. Puppa started his professional career in 1985, splitting time between the Buffalo Sabres and the AHL's Rochester Americans. He made his debut at the age of 20 years, 223 days on November 1, 1985, and posted a 2-0 shutout win over the Edmonton Oilers. He was the starting goalie for the Amerks in the 1986-1987 season when the team won the Calder Cup. Following the trade of Buffalo's all-star goaltender Tom Barrasso to the Pittsburgh Penguins early in the 1988–89 season, Puppa battled Jacques Cloutier to establish himself as the Sabres' number one goalie, and the following season Puppa led the league with 31 wins in 56 games. In the 1992–93 season he was traded to the Maple Leafs, but played only eight games for them before being claimed by the Lightning via the Panthers in the 1993 NHL Expansion Draft. In 1995–96. Puppa's stellar goaltending was a major factor in the Lightning earning their first playoff berth in team history. The team took the heavily favoured Philadelphia Flyers to six games before losing in the first round. Puppa's solid goaltending in the 1995-96 season earned him his second Vezina nomination; he was second runner-up behind the ultimate winner, Jim Carey.

However, the next season Puppa developed chronic back trouble, and only played six games for the entire season. He only played 44 more games over the next four years, and he was forced to retire midway through the 1999–2000 season.

In addition to his 1996 nomination, Puppa also was the runner up to Patrick Roy for the 1989–1990 Vezina Trophy, awarded to the best NHL goaltender each year.

Puppa and his wife Meg have three children. The family resides in Tampa, Florida.

In 2019, Puppa returned to the ice in a game for the Buffalo Sabres Alumni Hockey Team while on a visit to Buffalo. Puppa, whose back problems and lingering effects from a 1989 shoulder injury still limit his mobility (he had not played hockey at any level since 2001 because of those injuries), led the Sabres alumni to a win.

== Career statistics ==
=== Regular season and playoffs ===
			Regular season									Playoffs
Season	Team	League	GP	W	L	T	MIN	GA	SO	GAA	SV%	GP	W	L	MIN	GA	SO	GAA	SV%
1981–82	Kirkland Lake Legion 87s	GNML	—	—	—	—	—	—	—	—	—	—	—	—	—	—	—	—	—
1982–83	Kirkland Lake Legion 87s	GNML	—	—	—	—	—	—	—	—	—	—	—	—	—	—	—	—	—
1983–84	RPI Engineers	ECAC	32	24	6	0	1816	89	0	2.94	—	—	—	—	—	—	—	—	—
1984–85	RPI Engineers	ECAC	32	31	1	0	1830	78	0	2.56	—	—	—	—	—	—	—	—	—
1985–86	Rochester Americans	AHL	20	8	11	0	1092	79	0	4.34	.873	—	—	—	—	—	—	—	—
1985–86	Buffalo Sabres	NHL	7	3	4	0	401	21	1	3.14	.886	—	—	—	—	—	—	—	—
1986–87	Rochester Americans	AHL	57	37	14	2	3129	146	1	2.80	.900	16	10	6	944	48	1	3.05	—
1986–87	Buffalo Sabres	NHL	3	0	2	1	185	13	0	4.22	.835	—	—	—	—	—	—	—	—
1987–88	Rochester Americans	AHL	26	14	8	2	1415	65	2	2.76	.906	2	0	1	108	5	0	2.78	—
1987–88	Buffalo Sabres	NHL	17	8	6	1	874	61	0	4.19	.870	3	1	1	140	11	0	4.70	.836
1988–89	Buffalo Sabres	NHL	37	17	10	6	1908	107	1	3.36	.889	—	—	—	—	—	—	—	—
1989–90	Buffalo Sabres	NHL	56	31	16	6	3241	156	1	2.89	.903	6	2	4	370	15	0	2.43	.921
1990–91	Buffalo Sabres	NHL	38	15	11	6	2092	118	2	3.38	.885	2	0	1	81	10	0	7.42	.783
1991–92	Rochester Americans	AHL	2	0	2	0	119	9	0	4.54	.830	—	—	—	—	—	—	—	—
1991–92	Buffalo Sabres	NHL	33	11	14	4	1757	114	0	3.89	.878	—	—	—	—	—	—	—	—
1992–93	Buffalo Sabres	NHL	24	11	5	4	1306	78	0	3.58	.890	—	—	—	—	—	—	—	—
1992–93	Toronto Maple Leafs	NHL	8	6	2	0	479	18	2	2.25	.922	1	0	0	20	1	0	3.00	.857
1993–94	Tampa Bay Lightning	NHL	63	22	33	6	1472	165	4	2.71	.899	—	—	—	—	—	—	—	—
1994–95	Tampa Bay Lightning	NHL	36	14	19	2	2013	90	1	2.68	.905	—	—	—	—	—	—	—	—
1995–96	Tampa Bay Lightning	NHL	57	29	16	9	3189	131	5	2.46	.918	4	1	3	173	14	0	4.85	.837
1996–97	Adirondack Red Wings	AHL	1	1	0	0	62	3	0	2.90	.864	—	—	—	—	—	—	—	—
1996–97	Tampa Bay Lightning	NHL	6	1	1	2	325	14	0	2.58	.907	—	—	—	—	—	—	—	—
1997–98	Tampa Bay Lightning	NHL	26	5	14	6	1456	66	0	2.72	.900	—	—	—	—	—	—	—	—
1998–99	Tampa Bay Lightning	NHL	13	5	6	1	691	33	2	2.87	.906	—	—	—	—	—	—	—	—
1999–00	Tampa Bay Lightning	NHL	5	1	2	0	249	19	0	4.58	.853	—	—	—	—	—	—	—	—
NHL totals			429	179	161	54	23,819	1,204	19	3.03	.897	16	4	9	785	51	0	3.90	.871

== Awards and honors ==
Award	Year
AHCA East second-team All-American	1983–84
AHCA All Tournament Team	1984–85
AHL Calder Cup Champion	1986–87
AHL first All-Star team	1986–87
NHL All-Star	1989–90
NHL second All-Star team	1989–90

Awards and achievements
Preceded by Adam Oates	ECAC Hockey Most Outstanding Player in Tournament; 1985	Succeeded by Doug Dadswell
