= John Carter (ice hockey) =

American ice hockey player (born 1963)

- Born: May 3, 1963 (age 63) Winchester, Massachusetts, U.S.
- Height: 5 ft 10 in (178 cm)
- Weight: 175 lb (79 kg; 12 st 7 lb)
- Position: Left wing
- Shot: Left
- Played for: San Jose Sharks; Boston Bruins
- National team: United States
- NHL draft: Undrafted
- Playing career: 1985–1995

John A. Carter (born May 3, 1963) is an American former professional ice hockey player who played for the Boston Bruins and San Jose Sharks of the National Hockey League. Carter also represented the United States at the 1986 Ice Hockey World Championships.

== Early life ==
Carter was born in Winchester, Massachusetts and raised in nearby Woburn. As a youth, Carter played in the 1976 Quebec International Pee-Wee Hockey Tournament with a minor ice hockey team from Assabet Valley.

== Career ==
Carter played four years with the RPI Engineers men's ice hockey team at the Rensselaer Polytechnic Institute. During his four years, he was named an All-American and helped Rensselaer to win the 1985 NCAA Championships.

Undrafted out of Rensselaer Polytechnic Institute in 1986, Carter signed a three-year contract with the Boston Bruins. Carter had a 10-year career jumping between the NHL and AHL. In a 1993 preseason game, he suffered a serious eye injury. After eight eye surgeries in the next few years, his eye finally had to be removed in 1996, leading to his retirement.

== Personal life ==
In 1990, while playing for the Boston Bruins, Carter had a relationship with Joanne Presti. They had a daughter, Alyssa, born in 1991. The couple was never married, and Carter was not involved in his daughter's life; he said in 2004 that he had only met his daughter once. In January 2004, Presti and her daughter were murdered in their home in Woburn, Massachusetts. Joanne had also been raped. While Carter was questioned by police, his voluntary DNA sample did not match DNA found at the scene. Michael Bizanowicz, a convicted sex offender and acquaintance of Presti, was later charged and convicted of the crimes.

== Career statistics ==
=== Regular season and playoffs ===
			Regular season					Playoffs
Season	Team	League	GP	G	A	Pts	PIM	GP	G	A	P	PIM
1982–83	RPI Engineers	ECAC	29	16	22	38	33	—	—	—	—	—
1983–84	RPI Engineers	ECAC	38	35	39	74	52	—	—	—	—	—
1984–85	RPI Engineers	ECAC	37	43	29	72	52	—	—	—	—	—
1985–86	RPI Engineers	ECAC	27	23	18	41	68	—	—	—	—	—
1985–86	Boston Bruins	NHL	3	0	0	0	0	—	—	—	—	—
1986–87	Moncton Golden Flames	AHL	58	25	30	55	60	6	2	3	5	5
1986–87	Boston Bruins	NHL	8	0	1	1	0	—	—	—	—	—
1987–88	Maine Mariners	AHL	76	38	38	76	145	10	4	4	8	44
1987–88	Boston Bruins	NHL	4	0	1	1	2	—	—	—	—	—
1988–89	Maine Mariners	AHL	24	13	6	19	12	—	—	—	—	—
1988–89	Boston Bruins	NHL	44	12	10	22	44	10	1	2	3	6
1989–90	Maine Mariners	AHL	2	2	2	4	2	—	—	—	—	—
1989–90	Boston Bruins	NHL	76	17	22	39	26	21	6	3	9	45
1990–91	Maine Mariners	AHL	16	5	9	14	16	1	0	0	0	10
1990–91	Boston Bruins	NHL	50	4	7	11	68	—	—	—	—	—
1991–92	Kansas City Blades	IHL	42	11	15	26	116	15	6	9	15	18
1991–92	San Jose Sharks	NHL	4	0	0	0	0	—	—	—	—	—
1992–93	Kansas City Blades	IHL	9	4	2	6	14	—	—	—	—	—
1992–93	San Jose Sharks	NHL	55	7	9	16	81	—	—	—	—	—
1993–94	Providence Bruins	AHL	47	11	5	16	82	—	—	—	—	—
1994–95	Worcester IceCats	AHL	64	18	9	27	96	—	—	—	—	—
NHL totals			244	40	50	90	201	31	7	5	12	51

== Awards and honors ==
Award	Year
All-ECAC Hockey Second team	1983–84
AHCA East First-Team All-American	1983–84
All-ECAC Hockey First Team	1984–85
AHCA East Second-Team All-American	1984–85
