= College ice hockey statistics =

Main logo used by the NCAA in Divisions I, II, and III

This is a list of current and former varsity ice hockey programs that played under NCAA guidelines and/or predated the NCAA's foundation.

== History ==
When the NCAA began overseeing college ice hockey in 1947, the statistical record-keeping for players was not a priority. Teams were allowed to be entirely responsible for their own players' stats and, as a result, some programs have good existing records while others do not. Goaltender stats are particularly absent in many programs, with several categories either missing or incomplete into the 1980s. As the importance of college hockey grew, with an increasing number of players having a chance at a professional career, stats became indispensable for players as a way of attracting attention from scouts.

== Pre-NCAA records ==
Few schools track records prior to 1947. Most individual records from this period are missing, and many of the statistics that exist cannot be verified.

Of the existing marks, the pre-NCAA stats should be divided into three separate eras: pre-1920, 1920–1932, and 1932–1947. In the first era, teams played 7-on-7 for (typically) 40 minutes, and many teams used the same lineup throughout the match. College hockey shifted to the modern 6-on-6 style shortly after World War I, with the final recorded 7-on-7 match being played in 1921 (Harvard was the last holdout). About the same time, teams began playing three 15-minute periods rather than two 20-minute halves. The periods were soon expanded to 20-minutes for most contests throughout the 1920s, until 60-minute games became the standard before the 1930s. 1932 was the first year that assists were officially recorded as a statistic, though many teams had tracked assists, albeit infrequently, as early as 1927. Initially, only the primary assist was tracked; however, college teams soon began following the NHL model, and the secondary assist was eventually recorded as well.

The records that follow are unofficial, and few are complete.

=== Pre-1920 ===
==== Career ====
Name	Player	School	Years	Record
Goals	Hobey Baker	Princeton	1911–1914	80
Goals per game	Hobey Baker	Princeton	1911–1914	2.16
Wins	Holcomb York	Yale	1914–1917	23
Shutouts	Clarence Peacock	Princeton	1907–1910	15

==== Season ====
Name	Player	School	Year	Record
Goals	Hobey Baker	Princeton	1912–1913	35
Goals per game	Clarence Brown	Williams	1907–1908	3.75
Wins	Frank Winants	Princeton	1912–1913	12
Shutouts	Clarence Peacock	Princeton	1907–1908	8

==== Game ====
Name	Player	School	Date	Record
Goals	Richard Townsend	Harvard	January 18, 1905	8
Goals	John Heron	Yale	February 2, 1909	8
Goals	Hobey Baker	Princeton	December 20, 1912	8

== NCAA Division I men's records ==
The NCAA does not recognize any statistical achievements prior to 1947–48. Beginning that year and ending in 1963–64, all varsity programs played at the same level. Despite the NCAA creating the university and college tiers in the mid-50s, there was only one national tournament and no official separation for college hockey. While there were informal tiers of play (the WCHA being regarded as superior to the MIAC, for instance), the delineation of college ice hockey was not formally introduced until ECAC 2 was formed and all lower-tier programs were placed in the College Division. Because of this, all scoring prior to 1964 was done at the equivalent of the Division I level. The NCAA created numerical divisions in 1973, and all university-division records were grandfathered into D-I.

=== Individual records ===
Records reflect only those statistics that are available. Current as of June 1, 2022.

==== Career ====
Name	Player	School	Years	Record
Goals	Phil Latreille	Middlebury	1957–1961	250
Assists	Wayne Gagné	Western Michigan	1983–1987	199
Points	Phil Latreille	Middlebury	1957–1961	346
Penalty minutes	Dan Mandich	Ohio State	1978–1982	617
Goals per game *	Phil Latreille	Middlebury	1957–1961	3.01
Assists per game *	Lance Nethery	Cornell	1975–1979	1.62
Points per game *	Phil Latreille	Middlebury	1957–1961	4.17
Penalty minutes per game *	Dan Mandich	Ohio State	1978–1982	4.26
Power-play goals	Tom Ross	Michigan State	1972–1976	72
Short-handed goals	John Madden	Michigan	1993–1997	23
Game-winning goals	Brett Sterling	Colorado College	2002–2006	23
Game-winning goals	Austin Ortega	Omaha	2013–2017	23
Goals by a defenseman	Ron Wilson	Providence	1973–1977	78
Assists by a defenseman	Wayne Gagné	Western Michigan	1983–1987	199
Points by a defenseman	Ron Wilson	Providence	1973–1977	250
Wins	Marty Turco	Michigan	1994–1998	127
Winning percentage *	Ken Dryden	Cornell	1966–1969	.944
Saves	Robbie Moore	Michigan	1972–1976	4,434
Save percentage *	Connor Hellebuyck	Massachusetts Lowell	2012–2014	.946
Goals against average *	David LeNeveu	Cornell	2001–2003	1.29
Shutouts	Dryden McKay	Minnesota State	2018–2022	34

* Minimum 30 games played.

==== Season ====
Name	Player	School	Year	Record
Goals	Phil Latreille	Middlebury	1960–1961	80
Assists	Wayne Gagné	Western Michigan	1986–1987	76
Points	Tony Hrkac	North Dakota	1986–1987	116
Penalty minutes	Todd Skoglund	Alaska Anchorage	1993–1994	267
Goals per game	Phil Latreille	Middlebury	1960–1961	3.81
Assists per game	Lance Nethery	Cornell	1977–1978	2.31
Points per game	Phil Latreille	Middlebury	1960–1961	5.14
Power-play goals	Rob Bryden	Western Michigan	1986–1987	32
Short-handed goals	John Madden	Michigan	1995–1996	10
Game-winning goals	Austin Ortega	Omaha	2014–2015	11
Goals by a defenseman	Paul Hurley	Boston College	1966–1967	32
Assists by a defenseman	Wayne Gagné	Western Michigan	1986–1987	76
Points by a defenseman	Wayne Gagné	Western Michigan	1986–1987	89
Wins	Dryden McKay	Minnesota State	2021–2022	38
Winning percentage *	Brian Cropper	Cornell	1969–1970	1.000
Winning percentage *	Jim Craig	Boston University	1977–1978	1.000
Saves	Robb Stauber	Minnesota	1987–1988	1,711
Save percentage *	Jimmy Howard	Maine	2003–2004	.956
Goals against average *	Yaniv Perets	Quinnipiac	2021–2022	1.17
Shutouts	Greg Gardner	Niagara	1999–2000	12
Consecutive Shutouts	Blaine Lacher	Lake Superior State	1993–1994	5
Consecutive Shutouts	Atte Tolvanen	Northern Michigan	2016–2017	5
Shutout streak	Blaine Lacher	Lake Superior State	1993–1994	375:01

* Minimum 1/3 of team minutes played.

==== Game ====
Name	Player	School	Date	Record
Goals	Phil Latreille	Middlebury	March, 1960	10
Assists	Don Sennott	Brown	January 31, 1952	9
Assists	Gordie Peterkin	Rensselaer	December 2, 1952	9
Points	Gordie Peterkin	Rensselaer	December 2, 1952	13
Fastest goal to start a game	Bill Klatt	Minnesota	January 13, 1968	00:05
Fastest goal to start a game	Kevin Zappia	Clarkson	November 29, 1975	00:05
Fastest goal to start a game	Ryan McLeod	Alaska	March 11, 2005	00:05
Fastest two goals (1 player)	John Gray	New Hampshire	February 6, 1971	3 Seconds
Fastest two goals (1 team)	Tony Frasca / Omer Brandt	Colorado College	February 1, 1952	2 Seconds
Fastest hat trick	Tom Meeker	Clarkson	February 12, 1955	15 Seconds
Power-play goals	Dave Silk	Boston University	November 22 1977	4
Power-play goals	Tom Cullity	Vermont	February 3, 1979	4
Power-play goals	Jay Mazur	Maine	February 7, 1987	4
Short-handed goals	Mike Gurtler ^{†}	Holy Cross	November 20, 2009	3
Saves	Cal Peterson	Notre Dame	March 6, 2015	87

† Seven players have scored 3 short handed goals in 1 game. Only the most recent is listed.

== NCAA Division I men's leaders ==
A list of all-time statistical leaders. Only includes statistics recorded while playing at the Division I level or equivalent.
As of June 1, 2023.

=== Career ===
==== Goals ====
Player	Team	Games	Goals
Phil Latreille	Middlebury	83	250
Chuck Delich	Air Force	109	156
Frank Chiarelli	Rensselaer	80	155
John Mayasich	Minnesota	111	144
Denny Felsner	Michigan	162	139
Tom Ross	Michigan State	155	138
Mike Zuke	Michigan Tech	163	133
Steve Colp	Michigan State	138	132
Ben Cherski	North Dakota	100	131
Gary Emmons	Northern Michigan	151	130

==== Assists ====
Player	Team	Games	Assists
Wayne Gagné	Western Michigan	160	199
Greg Johnson	North Dakota	155	198
Jim Montgomery	Maine	170	198
Theran Welsh	Wisconsin	161	194
Paul Polillo	Western Michigan	165	189
Dallas Gaume	Denver	145	188
Tom Ross	Michigan State	155	186
Jim Dowd	Lake Superior State	181	183
Nelson Emerson	Bowling Green	178	182
Brendan Morrison	Michigan	155	182

==== Points ====
Player	Team	Games	Points
Phil Latreille	Middlebury	83	346
Tom Ross	Michigan State	155	324
Mike Zuke	Michigan Tech	163	310
Jim Montgomery	Maine	170	301
Steve Colp	Michigan State	138	300
John Mayasich	Minnesota	111	298
Nelson Emerson	Bowling Green	178	294
Dan Dorion	Western Michigan	157	293
Dave Delich	Colorado College	153	285
Brendan Morrison	Michigan	155	284

==== Wins ====
Player	Team	Games	Wins
Marty Turco	Michigan	165	127
Dryden McKay	Minnesota State	140	113
Steve Shields	Michigan	149	111
Scott Clemmensen	Boston College	147	99
Josh Blackburn	Michigan	151	92
John Muse	Boston College	144	89
Gary Kruzich	Bowling Green	130	88
Chad Alban	Michigan State	131	88
Al Montoya	Michigan	123	86
Dan Murphy	Clarkson	135	85

==== Goals against average* ====
Player	Team	Games	GAA
David LeNeveu	Cornell	46	1.29
Yaniv Perets	Quinnipiac	74	1.34
Dryden McKay	Minnesota State	140	1.46
Ryan Miller	Michigan State	105	1.54
Filip Lindberg	Massachusetts	50	1.58
Ken Dryden	Cornell	83	1.60
Connor Hellebuyck	Massachusetts Lowell	53	1.60
Matthew Galajda	Cornell / Notre Dame	112	1.70
David McKee	Cornell	102	1.71
Joe Blackburn	Michigan State	59	1.76

==== Save percentage* ====
Player	Team	Games	SV%
Connor Hellebuyck	Massachusetts Lowell	53	.946
Devon Levi	Northeastern	66	.942
Ryan Miller	Michigan State	105	.941
Ken Dryden	Cornell	83	.939
David LeNeveu	Cornell	46	.938
Colton Point	Colgate	43	.938
Filip Lindberg	Massachusetts	50	.937
Anthony Borelli	Brown	35	.935
Yaniv Perets	Quinnipiac	74	.934
Evan Cowley	Denver	52	.933
Alex Lyon	Yale	82	.933

* Minimum 30 games.

== NCAA Division I men's leaders by team ==
A list of career leaders for current NCAA Division I programs. Only includes statistics recorded while the program was playing at the Division I level.
As of June 1, 2025.

School	Goals	Assists	Points	Wins	GAA *	Sv% *
Air Force	156 (Chuck Delich)	144 (Dave Skalko)	270 (Chuck Delich)	69 (Andrew Volkening)	1.96 (Shane Starrett)	.924 (Shane Starrett)
Alaska	113 (Dean Fedorchuk)	136 (Tavis MacMillan)	215 (Dean Fedorchuk)	54 (Mike Carr)	2.05 (Matt Radomsky)	.916 (Scott Greenham / Matt Radomsky)
Alaska Anchorage	76 (Rob Conn)	137 (Dean Larson)	200 (Dean Larson)	53 (Paul Krake)	2.31 (Gregg Naumenko)	.908 (Olivier Mantha)
Arizona State	70 (Johnny Walker)	68 (Brinson Pasichnuk)	123 (Johnny Walker)	32 (Joey Daccord)	2.32 (Gibson Homer)	.924 (Gibson Homer)
Army	112 (David Merhar)	135 (Robbie Craig)	229 (David Merhar)	53 (Daryl Chamberlain)	2.18 (Trevin Kozlowski)	.926 (Parker Gahagen)
Augustana	25 (Luke Mobley)	26 (Brett Meerman)	39 (Luke Mobley)	19 (Josh Kotai)	2.32 (Josh Kotai)	.926 (Josh Kotai)
Bemidji State	65 (Matt Read)	88 (Brad Hunt)	143 (Matt Read)	65 (Michael Bitzer)	1.98 (Michael Bitzer)	.921 (Michael Bitzer)
Bentley	73 (Brett Gensler)	94 (Brett Gensler)	167 (Brett Gensler)	47 (Branden Komm)	2.27 (Connor Hasley)	.919 (Branden Komm)
Boston College	123 (Brian Gionta)	130 (Mike Mottau)	239 (David Emma)	99 (Scott Clemmensen)	2.05 (Matti Kaltiainen)	.928 (Thatcher Demko)
Boston University	113 (Chris Drury)	143 (John Cullen / David Sacco)	241 (John Cullen)	63 (Sean Fields)	2.07 (John Curry)	.923 (John Curry)
Bowling Green	127 (Jamie Wansbrough)	182 (Nelson Emerson)	294 (Nelson Emerson)	88 (Gary Kruzich)	2.06 (Ryan Bednard)	.922 (Chris Nell)
Brown	86 (Bob Wheeler)	112 (Bill Gilligan)	180 (Bill Gilligan)	43 (Kevin McCabe / Yann Danis)	2.04 (Anthony Borelli)	.935 (Anthony Borelli)
Canisius	62 (Cory Conacher)	95 (Josh Heidinger)	147 (Cory Conacher)	42 (Bryan Worosz)	1.82 (Charles Williams)	.943 (Charles Williams)
Clarkson	103 (Kevin Zappia)	153 (Dave Taylor)	251 (Dave Taylor)	85 (Dan Murphy)	1.78 (Frank Marotte)	.938 (Frank Marotte)
Colgate	114 (Dan Fridgen)	129 (Steve Smith)	214 (Mike Harder)	55 (Dan Brenzavich / Steve Silverthorn)	1.90 (Colton Point)	.938 (Colton Point)
Colorado College	111 (Dave Delich)	151 (Rob Doyle)	285 (Dave Delich)	76 (Jeff Sanger)	2.24 (Richard Bachman)	.925 (Kaidan Mbereko)
Connecticut	62 (Matt Scherer)	71 (Sean Ambrosie)	112 (Brant Harris)	40 (Garrett Bartus)	2.32 (Matt Grogan)	.926 (Matt Grogan)
Cornell	113 (Brock Tredway)	180 (Lance Nethery)	271 (Lance Nethery)	76 (Ken Dryden)	1.29 (David LeNeveu)	.939 (Ken Dryden)
Dartmouth	70 (Ross Brownridge)	96 (Ross Brownridge)	166 (Ross Brownridge)	50 (Nick Boucher)	2.30 (Dan Yacey)	.917 (Dan Yacey)
Denver	94 (Rick Berens)	188 (Dallas Gaume)	266 (Dallas Gaume)	82 (Ron Grahame / Tanner Jaillet)	1.93 (Devin Cooley)	.933 (Evan Cowley)
Ferris State	101 (Paul Lowden)	130 (John DePourcq)	208 (Paul Lowden)	66 (C. J. Motte)	2.13 (C. J. Motte)	.926 (C. J. Motte)
Harvard	111 (Lane MacDonald)	133 (Scott Fusco)	240 (Scott Fusco)	72 (Grant Blair)	1.93 (Godfrey Wood)	.924 (Merrick Madsen / Dov Grumet-Morris)
Holy Cross	70 (Tyler McGregor)	104 (James Sixsmith)	152 (James Sixsmith)	61 (Tony Quesada)	2.50 (Tony Quesada)	.917 (Matt Ginn)
Lake Superior State	118 (Randy McArthur)	183 (Jim Dowd)	274 (Jim Dowd)	71 (Darrin Madeley)	2.36 (Darrin Madeley)	.925 (Jeff Jakaitis)
Lindenwood	32 (David Gagnon)	42 (David Gagnon)	74 (David Gagnon)	11 (Trent Burnham)	4.04 (Trent Burnham)	.904 (Trent Burnham)
Long Island	44 (Josh Zary)	67 (Cade Mason)	77 (Cade Mason)	17 (Noah Rupprecht)	2.27 (Noah Rupprecht)	.901 (Noah Rupprecht)
Maine	108 (Jean-Yves Roy)	198 (Jim Montgomery)	301 (Jim Montgomery)	66 (Scott King / Garth Snow)	1.84 (Jimmy Howard)	.931 (Jimmy Howard)
Massachusetts	73 (Warren Norris)	96 (James Marcou)	166 (Rob Bonneau)	73 (Matt Murray)	1.58 (Filip Lindberg)	.937 (Filip Lindberg)
Massachusetts Lowell	97 (Jon Morris)	134 (Jon Morris)	231 (Jon Morris)	58 (Tyler Wall)	1.60 (Connor Hellebuyck)	.946 (Connor Hellebuyck)
Mercyhurst	68 (David Borrelli)	95 (Ben Cottreau)	156 (Ben Cottreau)	50 (Brandon Wildung)	2.40 (Peter Aubry)	.920 (Ryan Zapolski)
Merrimack	77 (Kris Porter)	111 (Rejean Stringer)	165 (Rejean Stringer)	59 (Joe Cannata)	2.28 (Hugo Ollas)	.918 (Rasmus Tirronen)
Miami	101 (Rick Kuraly)	138 (Steve Morris)	202 (Steve Morris)	60 (David Burleigh)	1.94 (Connor Knapp)	.927 (Jeff Zatkoff)
Michigan	139 (Denny Felsner)	182 (Brendan Morrison)	284 (Brendan Morrison)	127 (Marty Turco)	2.06 (Shawn Hunwick)	.928 (Shawn Hunwick)
Michigan State	138 (Tom Ross)	186 (Tom Ross)	324 (Tom Ross)	88 (Chad Alban)	1.54 (Ryan Miller)	.941 (Ryan Miller)
Michigan Tech	133 (Mike Zuke)	177 (Mike Zuke)	310 (Mike Zuke)	58 (Bruce Horsch / Blake Pietila)	2.00 (Jamie Phillips)	.923 (Blake Pietila)
Minnesota	144 (John Mayasich)	159 (Larry Olimb)	298 (John Mayasich)	84 (Kellen Briggs)	2.09 (Adam Wilcox)	.922 (Adam Wilcox)
Minnesota Duluth	100 (Thomas Milani)	149 (Tom Kurvers)	222 (Dan Lempe)	76 (Hunter Shepard)	1.94 (Hunter Shepard)	.922 (Hunter Shepard)
Minnesota State	71 (Marc Michaelis)	113 (Matt Leitner)	164 (Aaron Fox)	113 (Dryden McKay)	1.46 (Dryden McKay)	.932 (Dryden McKay)
New Hampshire	127 (Ralph Cox)	144 (Jason Krog)	243 (Ralph Cox)	70 (Kevin Regan)	2.18 (Ty Conklin)	.928 (Kevin Regan)
Niagara	75 (Ted Cook)	103 (Chris Moran)	166 (Barret Ehgoetz)	54 (Jeff Van Nynatten)	2.01 (Greg Gardner)	.930 (Carsen Chubak)
North Dakota	131 (Ben Cherski)	198 (Greg Johnson)	272 (Greg Johnson)	80 (Karl Goehring)	2.07 (Adam Scheel)	.926 (Zane McIntyre)
Northeastern	100 (Art Chisholm)	117 (Jim Martel)	210 (Jim Martel)	57 (Bruce Racine)	1.90 (Devon Levi)	.942 (Devon Levi)
Northern Michigan	130 (Gary Emmons)	143 (Bill Joyce)	255 (Bill Joyce)	81 (Bill Pye)	2.24 (Tuomas Tarkki)	.924 (Tuomas Tarkki)
Notre Dame	104 (Greg Meredith)	145 (Brian Walsh / John Noble)	234 (Brian Walsh)	59 (Jordan Pearce)	1.98 (Jordan Pearce)	.931 (Cale Morris)
Ohio State	114 (Paul Pooley)	156 (Paul Pooley)	270 (Paul Pooley)	73 (Mike Betz)	2.07 (Dave Caruso)	.933 (Brady Hjelle)
Omaha	78 (Scott Parse)	119 (Scott Parse)	197 (Scott Parse)	54 (John Faulkner)	2.47 (Ryan Massa)	.917 (Ryan Massa)
Penn State	61 (Nate Sucese)	84 (David Goodwin)	140 (Nate Sucese)	76 (Peyton Jones)	2.72 (Liam Soulière)	.909 (Matt Skoff)
Princeton	75 (Ryan Kuffner)	118 (John Messuri)	178 (John Messuri)	57 (Zane Kalemba)	2.38 (Robert O'Connor)	.917 (Mike Condon)
Providence	102 (Rob Gaudreau)	172 (Ron Wilson)	250 (Ron Wilson)	72 (Hayden Hawkey)	1.90 (Nick Ellis)	.931 (Nick Ellis / Jon Gillies)
Quinnipiac	73 (David Marshall)	129 (Odeen Tufto)	169 (Brian Herbert / Bryan Leitch)	78 (Michael Garteig)	1.34 (Yaniv Perets)	.934 (Yaniv Perets)
RIT	70 (Erik Brown)	102 (Dan Ringwald)	138 (Cameron Burt)	41 (Jared DeMichiel)	1.98 (Shane Madolora)	.932 (Shane Madolora)
Robert Morris	85 (Cody Wydo)	110 (Brady Ferguson)	167 (Brady Ferguson)	50 (Frank Marotte)	2.55 (Frank Marotte)	.925 (Eric Levine)
Rensselaer	155 (Frank Chiarelli)	150 (Adam Oates)	265 (Frank Chiarelli)	58 (Neil Little)	2.26 (Owen Savory)	.929 (Owen Savory)
Sacred Heart	65 (Pierre-Luc O'Brien)	99 (Bear Trapp)	158 (Pierre-Luc O'Brien)	39 (Brett Magnus)	2.51 (Josh Benson)	.917 (Eddy Ferhi)
St. Cloud State	86 (Mark Hartigan)	113 (Garrett Roe)	183 (Ryan Lasch)	82 (Dávid Hrenák)	2.21 (Charlie Lindgren)	.924 (Bobby Goepfert)
St. Lawrence	101 (Brian McFarlane)	119 (Paul DiFrancesco)	187 (Pete Lappin)	65 (Bill Sloan)	2.09 (Kyle Hayton)	.934 (Kyle Hayton)
Stonehill	32 (Frank Ireland)	42 (Frank Ireland)	74 (Frank Ireland)	11 (Connor Androlewicz)	3.11 (Connor Androlewicz)	.900 (Connor Androlewicz)
Union	78 (Daniel Carr)	105 (Mike Vecchione)	176 (Mike Vecchione)	53 (Colin Stevens)	1.89 (Troy Grosenick)	.930 (Troy Grosenick)
Vermont	107 (Éric Perrin)	176 (Martin St. Louis)	267 (Martin St. Louis)	81 (Tim Thomas)	2.05 (Joe Fallon)	.916 (Joe Fallon)
Western Michigan	115 (Dan Dorion)	199 (Wayne Gagné)	293 (Dan Dorion)	71 (Bill Horn)	2.34 (Frank Slubowski)	.915 (Riley Gill)
Wisconsin	125 (Mark Johnson)	194 (Theran Welsh)	267 (Mike Eaves)	81 (Graham Melanson)	1.78 (Brian Elliott)	.930 (Brian Elliott)
Yale	80 (Jeff Hamilton)	114 (Andrew Miller)	173 (Jeff Hamilton)	50 (Alex Lyon)	1.88 (Alex Lyon)	.933 (Alex Lyon)

* Minimum 30 games
