= 2002 MAAC men's ice hockey tournament =

2002 MAAC Men's ice hockey tournament
- Dates: March 9–16, 2002
- Teams: 8
- Finals site: Hart Center; Worcester, Massachusetts
- Champions: Quinnipiac (1st title)
- Winning coach: Rand Pecknold (1st title)
- MVP: Matt Craig (Quinnipiac)
- MAAC Men's Ice Hockey Tournaments

The 2002 MAAC Men's Ice Hockey Tournament was the 4th championship in the history of the conference. It was played between March 9 and March 16, 2002. Quarterfinal games were played at home team campus sites, while the final four games were played at the Hart Center in Worcester, Massachusetts, the home venue of the Holy Cross Crusaders. By winning the tournament Quinnipiac received MAAC's automatic bid to the 2002 NCAA Men's Division I Ice Hockey Tournament, their first appearance in the tournament.

== Format ==
The tournament featured three rounds of play with each round being single-elimination. The teams that finish below eighth in the standings are ineligible for tournament play. In the first round, the first and eighth seeds, the second and seventh seeds, the third seed and sixth seeds, and the fourth seed and fifth seeds played with the winner advancing to the semifinals. In the semifinals, the highest and lowest seeds and second highest and second lowest seeds play with the winner advancing to the championship game. The tournament champion receives an automatic bid to the 2002 NCAA Men's Division I Ice Hockey Tournament.

== Conference standings ==
Note: GP = Games played; W = Wins; L = Losses; T = Ties; PTS = Points; GF = Goals For; GA = Goals Against

2001–02 Metro Atlantic Athletic Conference standings
	Conference							Overall					
	GP	W	L	T	PTS	GF	GA	GP	W	L	T	GF	GA
Mercyhurst†	26	21	2	3	45	103	48	37	24	10	3	130	89
Quinnipiac*	26	15	6	5	35	89	57	38	20	13	5	129	110
Holy Cross	26	14	7	5	33	95	69	34	17	12	5	120	109
Sacred Heart	26	15	8	3	33	92	72	34	16	14	4	111	107
Canisius	26	13	9	4	30	94	71	35	14	17	4	122	114
Connecticut	26	11	10	5	27	86	89	36	13	16	7	104	129
Iona	26	12	12	2	26	92	91	33	13	18	2	111	124
Army	26	9	11	6	24	87	86	35	11	18	6	109	114
American International	26	6	20	0	12	59	112	28	7	21	0	63	119
Fairfield	26	4	19	3	11	53	91	32	6	23	3	72	121
Bentley	26	4	20	2	10	57	121	32	4	26	2	69	150
Championship: Quinnipiac † indicates conference regular season champion * indicates conference tournament champion Final rankings: USA Today/American Hockey Magazine Poll Top 15 Poll

== Bracket ==
Teams are reseeded after the quarterfinals

Quarterfinals; March 9
1	Mercyhurst	2
8	Army	1
3	Holy Cross	5
6	Connecticut	6
2	Quinnipiac	6**
7	Iona	5
4	Sacred Heart	3*
5	Canisius	2

Semifinals; March 14
1	Mercyhurst	5
6	Connecticut	0
2	Quinnipiac	3
4	Sacred Heart	2

Championship; March 16
1	Mercyhurst	4
2	Quinnipiac	6

Note: * denotes overtime period(s)

=== Quarterfinals ===
==== (1) Mercyhurst vs. (8) Army ====
March 9	Mercyhurst	2 – 1	Army	Mercyhurst Ice Center	Recap
(Rynshoven) Louis Goulet - 19:39		First period	14:38 - Josh Morino (Boyle, Healey)
(Hansen, Tackaberry) Peter Rynshoven - GW - 10:18		Second period	No scoring
No scoring		Third period	No scoring
Peter Aubry ( 21 saves / 22 shots )		Goalie stats	Scot Hamilton ( 28 saves / 30 shots )

==== (2) Quinnipiac vs. (7) Iona ====
March 9	Quinnipiac	6 – 5	2OT	Iona	Northford Ice Pavilion	Recap
(Froehlich, Breen) Ryan Morton - 03:06 (Froehlich, Morton) Neil Breen - 07:54		First period		06:59 - PP - Tim Krueckl (Kellogg); 11:28 - PP - Rob Kellogg (Lutz, Carter); 13:43 - PP - Tim Krueckl (Lutz, Carter)
(Olson) Chris White - PP - 04:24 (Craig, Olson) Chris White - 07:17 (Froehlich) Ryan Morton - 13:30		Second period		06:13 - Chad Hordhagen (Ruhl, Schroeder)
No scoring		Third period		19:37 - EA - Tim Krueckl (Williams, Bararuk)
(Morton, Breen) Chris White - GW - 06:18		Second overtime period		No scoring
Jamie Holden ( 8 saves / 12 shots ) / Justin Eddy ( 25 saves / 26 shots )		Goalie stats		Scott Galenza ( 50 saves / 56 shots )

==== (3) Holy Cross vs. (6) Connecticut ====
March 9	Holy Cross	5 – 6	Connecticut	Hart Center	Recap
(Kealey, Smith) Patrick Rissmiller - 01:08		First period	08:49 - Ron D'Angelo (Ames, Nelson); 12:04 - Matt Grew (D'Angelo, Kamienski)
No scoring		Second period	05:43 - Patrick McLaughlin (Murphy, Miller); 11:11 - Evan Schwarz (Rhein, Herhal); 18:16 - Eric Nelson
(Coskren) Jeff Dams - 01:14 (Rissmiller, Irving) Brandon Doria - PP - 09:01; Patrick Rissmiller - 13:10 (Rissmiller, Doria) Greg Kealey - 16:59		Third period	19:39 - GW - Kurt Kamienski (Grew, D'Angelo)
Derek Cunha ( 28 saves / 34 shots )		Goalie stats	Artie Imbriano ( 39 saves / 44 shots )

==== (4) Sacred Heart vs. (5) Canisius ====
March 9	Sacred Heart	3 – 2	Canisius	Milford Ice Pavilion
No Scoring		First period	02:26 - PP - Steve Birch (Duggan, Deeves)
No scoring		Second period	No scoring
(Metcalfe) Marc-Andre Fournier - 14:08 (Henck, Marks) Nick Nutcher - 14:39		Third period	02:20 - Marc Bouffard (Lucas, Street)
(Hrapchak) Garrett Larson - GW - 10:31		Overtime	No scoring
Eddy Ferhi ( 26 saves / 28 shots )		Goalie stats	Bryan Worosz ( 34 saves / 37 shots )

=== Semifinals ===
==== (1) Mercyhurst vs. (6) Connecticut ====
March 14	Mercyhurst	5 – 0	Connecticut	Hart Center	Recap
(Goulet, Rivers) Tom McMonagle - GW - 05:23 (Carter) Mike Muldoon - PP - 07:11		First period	No scoring
Louis Goulet - SH - 10:24		Second period	No scoring
Nolan Brown - 03:32 (Kemp, Hansen) Peter Rynshoven - PP - 08:39		Third period	No scoring
Peter Aubry ( 28 saves / 28 shots )		Goalie stats	Artie Imbriano ( 27 saves / 32 shots )

==== (2) Quinnipiac vs. (4) Sacred Heart ====
March 14	Quinnipiac	3 – 2	Sacred Heart	Hart Center	Recap
No Scoring		First period	16:23 - Peter McRae (Spostio, Forsland)
(Winkler, Bennett) Brian Herbert - PP - 02:38 (White) Matt Craig - 03:36 (Olson, Blais) Matt Craig - GW - 06:33		Second period	No scoring
No scoring		Third period	04:19 - PP - Michael Reagan (Mokos, McRae)
Jamie Holden ( 33 saves / 35 shots )		Goalie stats	Eddy Ferhi ( 22 saves / 25 shots )

=== Championship ===
==== (1) Mercyhurst vs. (2) Quinnipiac ====
March 16	Mercyhurst	4 – 6	Quinnipiac	Hart Center	Recap
No Scoring		First period	04:42 - Rob Hammel (Bennett, Herbert); 10:48 - Ryan Morton (Olson, White); 15:42 - Matt Froehlich (Ennis, Breen); 18:14 - Matt Craig (White, Watkins)
No scoring		Second period	No scoring
(Kemp, Rynshoven) Rich Hansen - PP - 01:55 (Olsen, King) David Wrigley - 05:36 (Rynshoven, Kemp) Adam Tackaberry - PP - 09:33 (Goulet, Rivers) Mike Muldoon - 15:57		Third period	02:38 - GW PP - Matt Erhart (Breen, Winkler); 19:51 - EN - Ryan Olson
Peter Aubry ( 4 saves / 8 shots ) / Matt Cifelli ( 17 saves / 18 shots )		Goalie stats	Jamie Holden ( 38 saves / 42 shots )

== Tournament awards ==
=== All-Tournament Team ===
- F Matt Craig* (Quinnipiac)
- F Chris White (Quinnipiac)
- F Louis Goulet (Mercyhurst)
- D Matt Erhart (Quinnipiac)
- D Mike Muldoon (Mercyhurst)
- G Jamie Holden (Quinnipiac)

* Most Valuable Player(s)
