= Mandich =

Mandich is a surname of Croatian and Serbian origin. Notable people with the surname include:

- Dan Mandich (born 1960), Canadian ice hockey player
- Jim Mandich (1948–2011), American football player
