= MAAC Goaltender of the Year =

MAAC Defensive Player of the Year
- Sport: Ice hockey
- Awarded for: The Defensive Player of the Year in the Metro Atlantic Athletic Conference

History
- First award: 1999
- Final award: 2003
- Most recent: Brad Roberts & Eddy Ferhi

The MAAC Defensive Player of the Year was an annual award given out at the conclusion of the Metro Atlantic Athletic Conference regular season to the best defensive men's ice hockey player in the conference as voted by the coaches of each MAAC team.

The award was discontinued after 2002-03 when the MAAC ice hockey conference was dissolved and all remaining programs reformed in Atlantic Hockey.

== Award winners ==
Year	Winner	Position	School
1998–99	Scott Simpson	Goaltender	Holy Cross
1999–00	Sean Weaver	Goaltender	Canisius
2000-01	Peter Aubry	Goaltender	Mercyhurst
2001-02	Peter Aubry	Goaltender	Mercyhurst
2002-03	Brad Roberts	Goaltender	Army
	Eddy Ferhi	Goaltender	Sacred Heart

=== Winners by school ===
School	Winners
Mercyhurst	2
Army	1
Canisius	1
Holy Cross	1
Sacred Heart	1

== See also ==
- Atlantic Hockey Regular Season Goaltending Award
- MAAC Awards
