= John Madden (ice hockey) =

Canadian ice hockey player (born 1973)

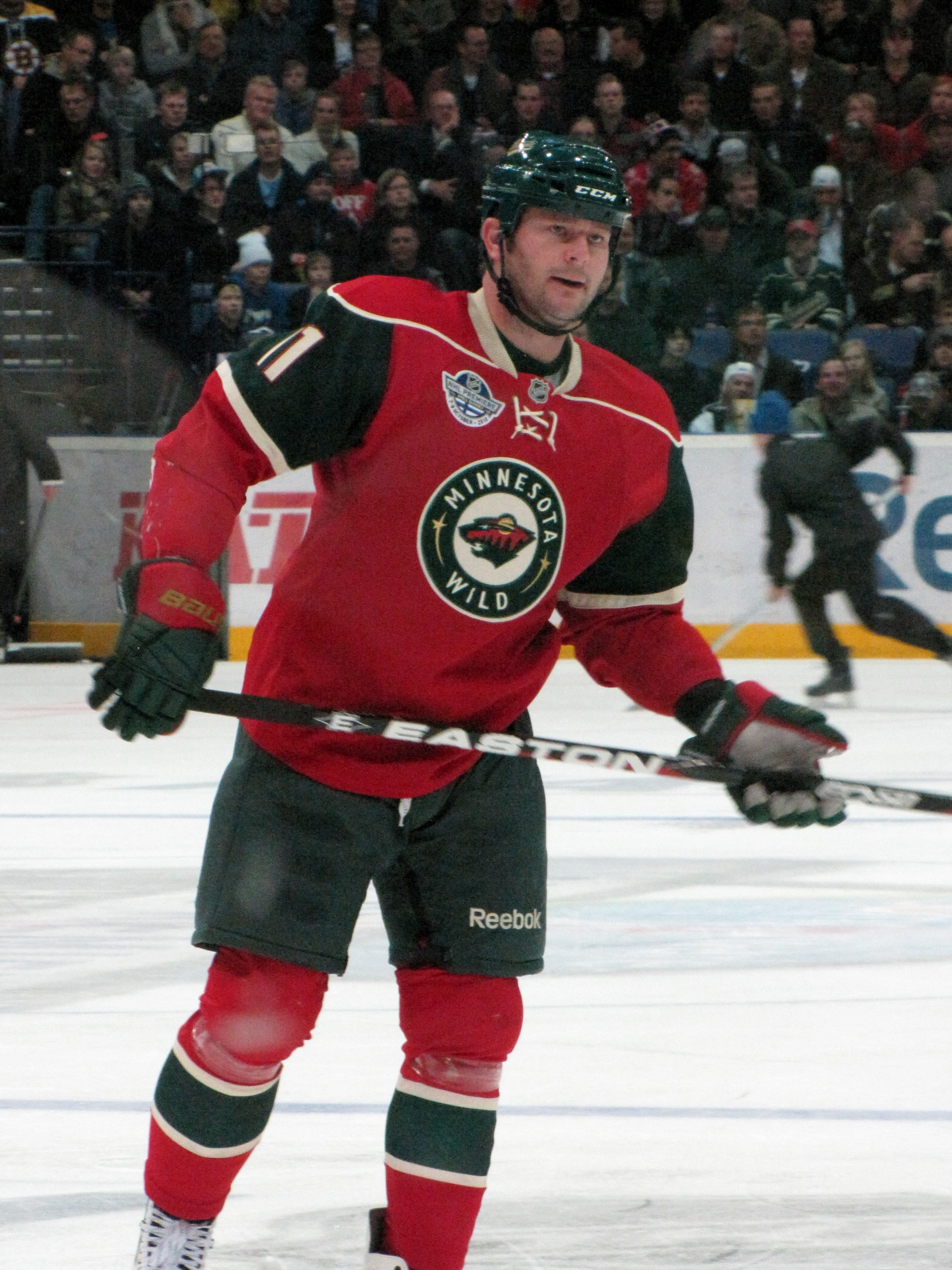
- Madden with the Minnesota Wild in October 2010
- Born: May 4, 1973 (age 53) Barrie, Ontario, Canada
- Height: 5 ft 11 in (180 cm)
- Weight: 190 lb (86 kg; 13 st 8 lb)
- Position: Centre
- Shot: Left
- Played for: New Jersey Devils; Chicago Blackhawks; Minnesota Wild; Florida Panthers
- Coached for: Cleveland Monsters (AHL)
- NHL draft: Undrafted
- Playing career: 1997–2012
- Coaching career: 2013–present

John J. Madden (born May 4, 1973) is a Canadian former professional ice hockey centre. He played 13 seasons in the National Hockey League (NHL), most notably for the New Jersey Devils. An undrafted player from the University of Michigan, he holds NCAA records for most career shorthanded goals (23) and most shorthanded goals in a single season (10). During his NHL career, Madden won the Stanley Cup three times, twice with the Devils and once with the Chicago Blackhawks. He became known for his defensive play and penalty-killing abilities.

Madden was one of the NHL's leading defensive forwards during his career; he was awarded the Frank J. Selke Trophy in 2001 and finished second in voting in 2003, 2004, and 2008. His penalty-killing abilities also contributed to his offensive production. During the 1999–2000 NHL season, he led the league with six shorthanded goals, setting a Devils franchise record.

After retiring as a player in 2012, Madden pursued a career in coaching and scouting. He served as an assistant coach for the Florida Panthers from 2013 to 2016 and as head coach of the Cleveland Monsters of the American Hockey League (AHL) from 2016 to 2019. He subsequently served as an assistant coach for the San Jose Sharks from 2020 to 2022 and the Arizona Coyotes before continuing in that role with the Utah Mammoth.

== Playing career ==
=== Early years ===
Madden grew up in a public housing project, Parma Court, in Toronto. Madden is a graduate of the Victoria Village House League and has also played for a number of minor league teams, including the Don Mills Flyers, Scarborough Bruins, Hillcrest Summits, and the Junior "C" Alliston Hornets, before moving up to the Junior "B" Barrie Colts. During his second full season (1992–93) with the Colts, Madden set team records for assists (75) and points (124).

Madden was selected in the 11th round, 173rd overall, in the 1992 OHL Priority Selection by the Niagara Falls Thunder after a 104-point season with the Barrie Colts Jr. B. (OHA) team. Madden did not report to Niagara Falls, instead choosing to pursue an NCAA scholarship. After his second season in Barrie, when he scored 124 points in 43 games, he was still passed over in the 1993 NHL entry draft.

However, of the 286 players drafted that year, only 24 have played more career NHL games than the undrafted Madden (as of the end of the 2009–10 NHL season).

Madden played college hockey for the University of Michigan, playing in 160 games and scoring 80 goals and 100 assists for 180 points, with 123 penalty minutes. During his four-year career with the Wolverines, Madden set the NCAA record for most career shorthanded goals (23) and was a member of the 1995–96 championship team. In his final season at Michigan, he was named to both the CCHA First All-Star and NCAA West First All-American Teams. Madden's teammates at Michigan included future NHL players Brendan Morrison, Mike Knuble, Blake Sloan, Marty Turco, Steve Shields, and Bill Muckalt.

The presence of Morrison, the Devils' second-round pick in 1993, proved fortuitous for Madden, whose strong work ethic was noticed by general manager Lou Lamoriello as he monitored Morrison's college development. Lamoriello eventually offered Madden a contract, and he signed with the Devils as an amateur free agent on June 26, 1997.

=== New Jersey Devils ===
Madden spent the bulk of his first two professional seasons with the Albany River Rats of the American Hockey League (AHL). He led the River Rats in scoring during the 1998–99 season, setting team records for assists (60) and points (98). He made his NHL debut on January 6, 1999, against cross-town rivals the New York Rangers (one of four games he played for the Devils that season) and collected his first career NHL point on January 18, 1999, against the San Jose Sharks. He won a permanent spot on the Devils' roster the following season (1999–2000) and remained with the team through to the 2008–09 season.

On October 29, 2000, in a 9–0 victory against the Pittsburgh Penguins, Madden and Randy McKay became the first NHL teammates to each score four goals in one game since January 14, 1922. Over his career, Madden had thirty-two 2-point games, three 3-point games, one 4-point game and one 5-point game.

For most of his time with the Devils, Madden was paired with left wing player Jay Pandolfo, prompting many Devils fans to refer to this ubiquitous duo as "Madolfo". The value of the Madden/Pandolfo partnership to the Devils was particularly notable after the 2004–05 NHL lockout. Despite the loss of defensive stalwarts Scott Stevens (retirement), Scott Niedermayer (free agency), and Ken Daneyko (retirement), as well as a series of rule changes designed to increase offence, the Devils have remained one of the NHL's least scored on and least penalized teams.

On April 25, 2006, Madden completed his first career playoff hat-trick in a 4–1 win over the New York Rangers; two of his goals were shorthanded, tying an NHL record.

Madden was a member of the Devils' 1999–2000 and 2002–03 Stanley Cup champion clubs. After the retirement of long-time captain Scott Stevens before the 2005–06 season, the Devils abandoned the use of the captain's "C" and instead used four alternate captains, drawing from a pool of Madden, Brian Rafalski, Colin White, Scott Gomez, Alexander Mogilny and Patrik Eliáš. Madden continued to wear the alternate captain's "A", except for a short time in the 2007–08 season, in which the "A" was given to Brian Gionta, Dainius Zubrus and Patrik Eliáš (Eliáš, after having the captaincy taken away). Once Jamie Langenbrunner, on December 5, 2007, was named captain, Madden once again was assigned the "A", along with defenseman Colin White.

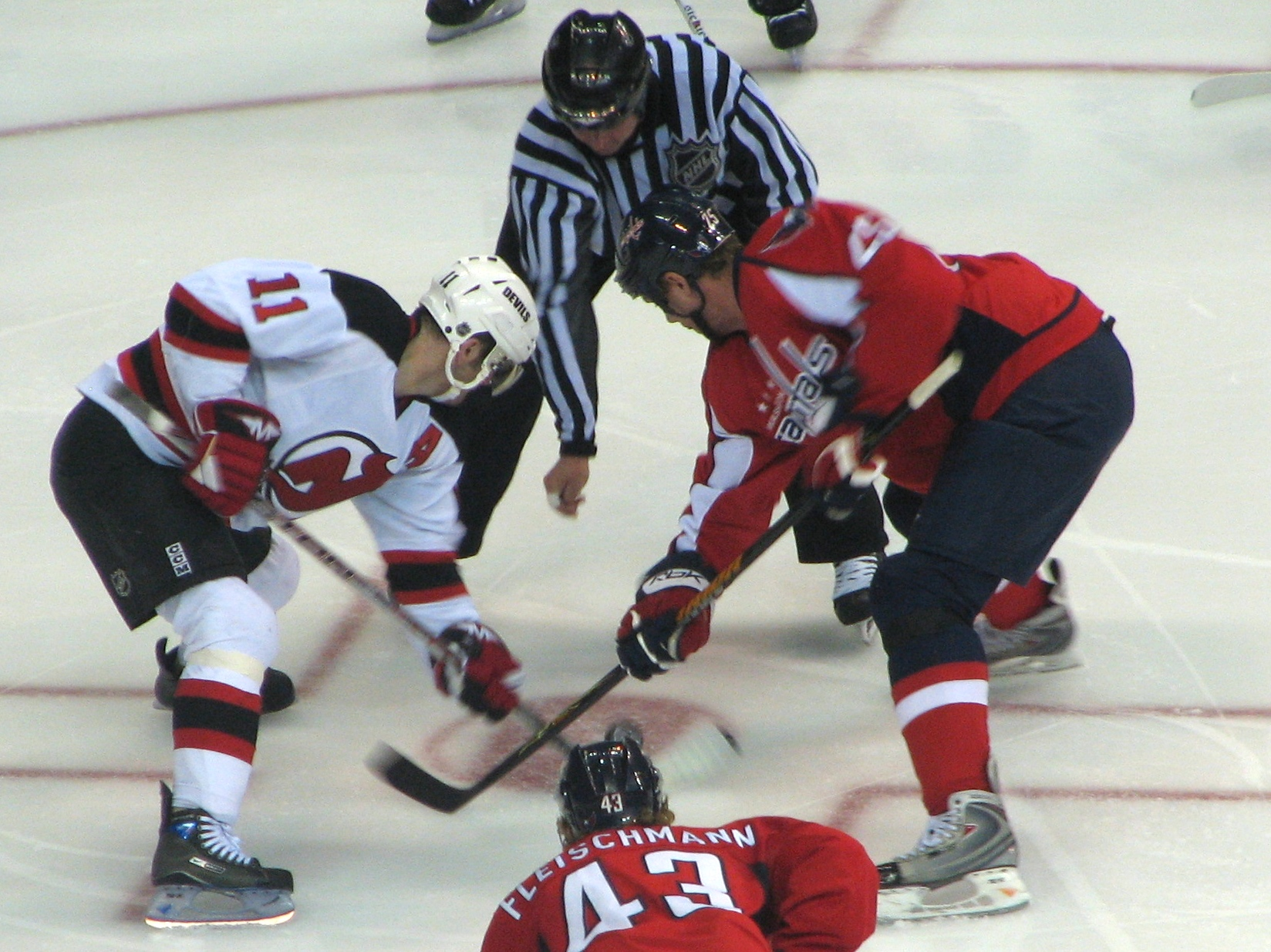
Madden (left) taking a faceoff in a February 2008 game

Madden scored his 100th career goal (regular season) on April 1, 2006, against the Philadelphia Flyers. Other career milestones included his 100th assist (October 18, 2006, against the Pittsburgh Penguins), 200th point (October 12, 2006, against the Toronto Maple Leafs), and 500th game (November 17, 2006, against the Ottawa Senators).

=== Chicago Blackhawks ===
As an unrestricted free agent on July 1, 2009, Madden signed a one-year contract with the Chicago Blackhawks worth $2.75 million. He won his third Stanley Cup with the Blackhawks that year.

=== Minnesota Wild ===
On August 6, 2010, Madden signed a one-year contract with the Minnesota Wild. While Madden scored 12 goals and 25 points in 76 games for the 2010–11 campaign, the Wild finished 12th in the Western Conference and failed to qualify for the playoffs by 11 points.

=== Florida Panthers ===
On January 4, 2012, Madden signed a one-year contract with the Florida Panthers, joining former Blackhawks teammates Kris Versteeg, Jack Skille, Brian Campbell and Tomáš Kopecký and former Devils teammate Scott Clemmensen. The 2011–12 season saw the Panthers clinched the playoff spot for the first time in twelve years, finishing third in the East. Madden, however, recorded no points during the 2012 playoffs as they lost the first round to his former team, the sixth-seeded New Jersey Devils, in seven games, despite initially having a 3–2 series lead.

Madden officially retired from the NHL on September 4, 2012.

== Post-retirement and coaching career ==
On September 4, 2012, Madden retired from the NHL. The same day, he accepted a position with the Montreal Canadiens amateur player recruitment group for scouting and evaluating amateur free agent talent in American college hockey.

On November 8, 2013, Peter Horachek was named interim head coach for the Florida Panthers and hired Madden as an assistant coach. Madden would stay with the team as an assistant after under head coach Gerard Gallant. Madden was fired by the Panthers on May 13, 2016.

On August 29, 2016, Madden was named the head coach of the Cleveland Monsters, the AHL affiliate of the Columbus Blue Jackets. Madden replaced Jared Bednar, who had coached the team to winning the league championship the previous season before being hired as the head coach of the Colorado Avalanche. He coached the Monsters for three seasons and a 101–99–4–4 record before leaving the team.

Madden joined the San Jose Sharks as an assistant coach on September 22, 2020. He was relieved of his duties on July 1, 2022.

On July 26, 2022, Madden joined the Arizona Coyotes as an assistant coach.

== Personal life ==
Madden and his wife Lauren have two children, Tyler and Reese. On June 23, 2018, Tyler Madden was drafted 68th overall by the Vancouver Canucks in the 2018 NHL entry draft and was traded from the Canucks to the Los Angeles Kings in the 2019–20 season.

== Career statistics ==
			Regular season					Playoffs
Season	Team	League	GP	G	A	Pts	PIM	GP	G	A	Pts	PIM
1989–90	Alliston Hornets	MOJHL	31	24	25	49	26	—	—	—	—	—
1990–91	Alliston Hornets	MOJHL	14	15	21	36	10	—	—	—	—	—
1990–91	Barrie Colts	CJHL	1	0	0	0	0	—	—	—	—	—
1991–92	Barrie Colts	CJHL	42	50	54	104	46	13	10	9	19	14
1992–93	Barrie Colts	CJHL	43	49	75	124	62	—	—	—	—	—
1993–94	Michigan Wolverines	CCHA	36	6	11	17	14	—	—	—	—	—
1994–95	Michigan Wolverines	CCHA	39	21	22	43	8	—	—	—	—	—
1995–96	Michigan Wolverines	CCHA	43	27	30	57	45	—	—	—	—	—
1996–97	Michigan Wolverines	CCHA	42	26	37	63	56	—	—	—	—	—
1997–98	Albany River Rats	AHL	74	20	36	56	40	13	3	13	16	14
1998–99	New Jersey Devils	NHL	4	0	1	1	0	—	—	—	—	—
1998–99	Albany River Rats	AHL	75	38	60	98	44	5	2	2	4	6
1999–2000	New Jersey Devils	NHL	74	16	9	25	6	20	3	4	7	0
2000–01	New Jersey Devils	NHL	80	23	15	38	12	25	4	3	7	6
2001–02	New Jersey Devils	NHL	82	15	8	23	25	6	0	0	0	0
2002–03	New Jersey Devils	NHL	80	19	22	41	26	24	6	10	16	2
2003–04	New Jersey Devils	NHL	80	12	23	35	22	5	0	0	0	0
2004–05	HIFK	SM-l	3	0	0	0	0	—	—	—	—	—
2005–06	New Jersey Devils	NHL	82	16	20	36	36	9	4	1	5	8
2006–07	New Jersey Devils	NHL	74	12	20	32	14	11	1	1	2	2
2007–08	New Jersey Devils	NHL	80	20	23	43	26	5	2	1	3	2
2008–09	New Jersey Devils	NHL	76	7	16	23	26	7	0	1	1	4
2009–10	Chicago Blackhawks	NHL	79	10	13	23	12	22	1	1	2	2
2010–11	Minnesota Wild	NHL	76	12	13	25	10	—	—	—	—	—
2011–12	Florida Panthers	NHL	31	3	0	3	4	7	0	0	0	0
NHL totals			898	165	183	348	219	141	21	22	43	26

== Awards and honours ==
Award	Year
NCAA National Champion	1996
CCHA All-Tournament Team	1996
All-CCHA First Team	1996–97
AHCA West First-Team All-American	1996–97
Stanley Cup champion (New Jersey)	2000, 2003
Frank J. Selke Trophy (New Jersey)	2001
Stanley Cup champion (Chicago)	2010

Awards and achievements
Preceded by Wayne Strachan	CCHA Most Valuable Player in Tournament; 1996	Succeeded by Brendan Morrison
Preceded by Bates Battaglia	CCHA Best Defensive Forward; 1996-97	Succeeded by Terry Marchant
Preceded by Steve Yzerman	Winner of the Frank J. Selke Trophy; 2001	Succeeded by Michael Peca
Sporting positions
Preceded by Jared Bednar	Cleveland Monsters head coach 2016–present	Succeeded by Incumbent
