= Statue of Dustin Brown =

Sculpture in Los Angeles, California, U.S.

- Subject: Dustin Brown
- Location: Los Angeles, California, U.S.; 34°2′37.2″N 118°15′59.4″W

A statue of ice hockey player Dustin Brown was installed outside Los Angeles' Crypto.com Arena, in the U.S. state of California, in 2023.
