= Phil Latreille =

Canadian ice hockey player (1938–2025)

- Born: April 22, 1938 Montreal, Quebec, Canada
- Died: August 6, 2025 (aged 87) Palm City, Florida, U.S.
- Height: 5 ft 10 in (178 cm)
- Weight: 185 lb (84 kg; 13 st 3 lb)
- Position: Centre, right wing
- Shot: Right
- Played for: New York Rangers
- Playing career: 1958–1963

Jean Philippe Latreille (April 22, 1938 – August 6, 2025) was a Canadian ice hockey player who played four games in the National Hockey League (NHL). He played with the New York Rangers during the 1960–61 season. Before that, he played four seasons with Middlebury College.

== Career ==
At Middlebury College, Latreille set all NCAA goal-scoring records. Phil Latreille scored 36 goals as a freshman, 57 goals as a sophomore, and 77 as a junior. While the NCAA had a policy of restricting players to three seasons of eligibility at the time, Middlebury did not field a freshman team. Instead, the program had its first-year players compete with the varsity squad. As a result, Latreille was one of the few players during the era to play four years of varsity hockey and used his senior season to score 80 goals and 108 points. His points record was equaled by Dave Taylor in 1976–77 and surpassed by Bill Watson in 1984–85 with the latter playing more than twice as many games (46) to surpass the mark. Latreille still holds eight NCAA records, including points per game in both a single season and career, along with goals per game in a season and career. He is the only three-time leading scorer in NCAA history as well as being the only player to average 5 points per game for one season. Latreille remains the all-time leader in goals, both in a season and for a career, for the top level of play as well as being the career leader for points. He does not hold any Division I records as the NCAA did not introduce numerical classifications until 1973, though all of his scoring accomplishments were grandfathered into D-I.

== Later life and death ==
In 2013, Latreille was named to the Vermont Sports Hall of Fame. He died at his home in Palm City, Florida, on August 6, 2025, at the age of 87.

== Career statistics ==
=== Regular season and playoffs ===
			Regular season					Playoffs
Season	Team	League	GP	G	A	Pts	PIM	GP	G	A	Pts	PIM
1956–57	D'Arcy McGee High School	HS-CA	10	13	9	22	—	—	—	—	—	—
1957–58	Middlebury College	TSL	20	36	16	52	20	—	—	—	—	—
1958–59	Middlebury College	TSL	20	57	33	90	—	—	—	—	—	—
1959–60	Middlebury College	NCAA	22	77	19	96	—	—	—	—	—	—
1960–61	Middlebury College	NCAA	21	80	28	108	—	—	—	—	—	—
1960–61	New York Rangers	NHL	4	0	0	0	2	—	—	—	—	—
1961–62	Long Island Ducks	EHL	6	0	2	2	0	—	—	—	—	—
1961–62	Montreal Olympics	ETSHL	20	11	4	15	0	13	11	4	15	8
1961–62	Montreal Olympics	Al-Cup	—	—	—	—	—	16	6	3	9	0
1962–63	Montreal Olympics	ETSHL	—	—	—	—	—	—	—	—	—	—
1963–64	Montreal Olympics	QUE Sr	—	—	—	—	—	—	—	—	—	—
1964–65	Calgary Spurs	Exhib	—	—	—	—	—	—	—	—	—	—
NCAA totals			83	250	96	346	—	—	—	—	—	—
NHL totals			4	0	0	0	2	—	—	—	—	—

== Awards and honors ==
Award	Year
AHCA East All-American	1958–59; 1959–60; 1960–61

Awards and achievements
Preceded by Bill Hay	NCAA Ice Hockey Scoring Champion; 1958–59, 1959–60, 1960–61	Succeeded by Ron Ryan
Sporting positions
Preceded by Frank Chiarelli	NCAA Single-Season Goals Leader; 1959–Present	Succeeded by Incumbent
Preceded by Frank Chiarelli	NCAA Career Goals Leader; 1960–Present	Succeeded by Incumbent
Preceded by Bill Cleary	NCAA Single-Season Points Leader; 1959–1985 (shared with Dave Taylor from 1977)	Succeeded by Bill Watson
Preceded by John Mayasich	NCAA Career Points Leader; 1961–Present	Succeeded by Incumbent
