= Dave Taylor (ice hockey) =

Canadian ice hockey player (b. 1955)

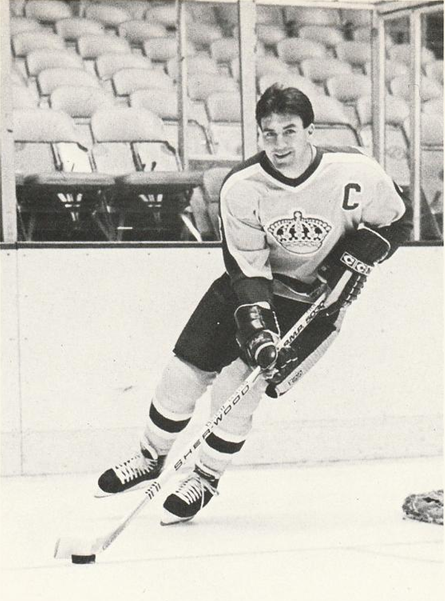
- Taylor with the Los Angeles Kings in 1986
- Born: December 4, 1955 (age 70) Levack, Ontario, Canada
- Height: 6 ft 0 in (183 cm)
- Weight: 195 lb (88 kg; 13 st 13 lb)
- Position: Right wing
- Shot: Right
- Played for: Los Angeles Kings
- National team: Canada
- NHL draft: 210th overall, 1975; Los Angeles Kings
- WHA draft: 113th overall, 1975; Houston Aeros
- Playing career: 1977–1994
Medal record
Representing Canada
World Championships
| Silver medal – second place | 1985 Czechoslovakia |
| Bronze medal – third place | 1983 West Germany |
| Bronze medal – third place | 1986 Soviet Union |

David Andrew Taylor (born December 4, 1955) is a Canadian former professional ice hockey player and current executive in the National Hockey League (NHL). He played as a right winger for the Los Angeles Kings in 17 seasons from 1977 to 1994. He currently serves as vice president of hockey operations for the St. Louis Blues.

Taylor was a star player at Clarkson University for four seasons while being drafted by both the National Hockey League (NHL) and World Hockey Association in 1975. He made it to the NHL in 1977 with the Los Angeles Kings. The 1980–81 season saw Taylor take part in history as the "Triple Crown Line" of Taylor, centre Marcel Dionne and left winger Charlie Simmer became the first line in league history where each player scored 100 points in the same season; Taylor's 112 points was a career high and the first of two straight 100-point seasons. In the 1980s, Taylor was named to the All-Star Game four times and was a Second All-Star once while recording two 40-goal seasons. In 1991, he was awarded the King Clancy Memorial Trophy and Bill Masterton Memorial Trophy for his perseverance and for his leadership qualities on and off the ice while also recording his 1,000th point, becoming the 29th player to do so in NHL history. In his penultimate season, Taylor reached the Stanley Cup Final for the only time in his career, with Taylor recording five goals and eight total points in 22 playoff games. After playing 33 games in the 1993–94 season, Taylor retired, having scored 431 goals and recorded 1,069 points in 1,111 games. Taylor had his number 18 retired by the Kings in 1995, the third player to receive the honour in franchise history.

After his playing career ended, Taylor became general manager of the Kings prior to the start of the 1997–98 season, serving in the position until the 2006–07 season. He served as director of player personnel of the Dallas Stars from 2007 to 2010 before being hired by the St. Louis Blues for the same position in 2010. He was promoted to vice president of operations in 2012 and won a Stanley Cup with the team in 2019.

== Early life ==
Taylor was born and raised in Levack, Ontario, a mining town located 45 km northwest of Sudbury, Ontario. He began playing minor hockey in Levack and became a young prodigy in the small town. In his teens, he attended his local Levack High School while also working in the mine in his hometown.

== Junior and college career ==
Taylor found himself playing Junior A for his hometown Onaping Falls Huskies of the Northern Ontario Junior Hockey League in 1973 where he recorded 67 goals and 76 assist to total 143 points in 45 games.

After one season with Onaping Falls with him graduating from high school. Taylor played four seasons of college hockey at Clarkson University, where he still holds the school record for career points (251) goals (98) and assists (153) as well as single season goals (41) assists (67) and points (108) in the 1976–77 campaign where he led all of NCAA that year and won the ECAC Hockey player of the year award. in comparison, opposing teams scored a combined 127 goals on Clarkson that year. He graduated with a bachelor's of science degree in industrial management in 1977. In 1992, he was honored by Clarkson with induction into the Athletics Hall of Fame and the Golden Knight Award (the highest alumni honor). He was granted an honorary Doctor of Science degree in 1997 and was awarded the Golden Knight Award, Clarkson's highest alumni honor, in 2002. In celebration of 50 years of ECAC Hockey in 2011, Taylor was named to the All-Time Top 50 Players list.

Taylor also played seven games with the Fort Worth Texans of the Central Hockey League during the 1976–77 season putting up two goals and four assists for six points.

== NHL career ==
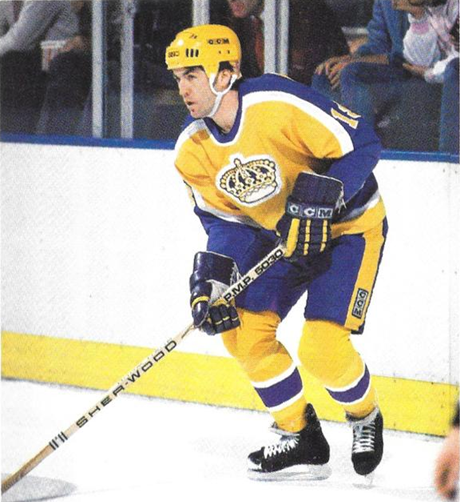
1984 card of Dave Taylor for the Los Angeles Kings

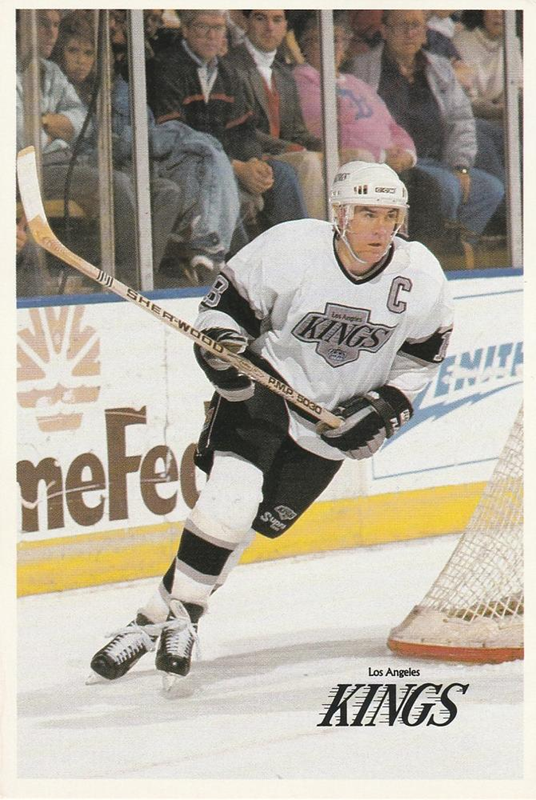
1988 postcard of Taylor as captain for the Kings

Taylor was selected 210th overall in the 15th round of the 1975 NHL Amateur Draft and was also selected 113th overall in the 9th round of the 1975 WHA Amateur Draft. His first NHL season was the 1977–78 season where he played 64 of 80 games and recorded 22 goals and 21 assists to total 43 points. In the next season of 1978–79, he improved to one of the league's top scorers recording 43 goals and 48 assists to total 91 points.

Taylor was a member of the famous Triple Crown Line along with hall of fame centre Marcel Dionne and left winger Charlie Simmer. In the 1980–81 season all three scored more than 100 points with the Kings with Dionne and Simmer scoring 135 and 105 points, respectively and Taylor scoring 112 points to record the best season of his career.

Taylor became captain of the Kings in 1985 after the departure of preceding captain Terry Ruskowski. He held the position until training camp of the 1989–90 season when Wayne Gretzky was named captain by new head coach Tom Webster, with Taylor consenting to the decision willingly. He would then serve as an alternate captain for the rest of his career. He provided an assist on Gretzky's goal in the third period on October 15 that made him the all-time points leader in league history.

On April 10, 1990, he, along with Tomas Sandström and Tony Granato, recorded hat-tricks against the Western Conference regular season champion Calgary Flames, becoming the first instance that three players from the same team recorded a hat trick in the same game in the playoffs. In 1991, Taylor won both the Bill Masterton Memorial Trophy for his dedication towards the Los Angeles Kings and the King Clancy Memorial Trophy for his involvement in charity work and for helping others overcome speech impediments.

In 1993, with his production rapidly deteriorating, Taylor and the Kings made the Stanley Cup Final with him producing three goals and five assists for eight points in 22 playoff games. The Kings lost to the Montreal Canadiens in the final in five games.

Troubled by head injuries the previous few seasons, the 1993–94 season proved to be his last as a player, which saw him plagued by headaches and dizziness with increased exercise, with a mild concussion suffered in a collision with teammate Warren Rychel during a January 4 game being his penultimate game. On April 12, 1994, Taylor announced his retirement and played his final game against the Edmonton Oilers, taking the faceoff before being taken out of the game for his 1,111th and final game in the league. He got a front-office position with the team as an assistant general manager. At the time he retired, only Bill Russell and Jackie Slater had played more seasons for a major professional sports franchise in the city of Los Angeles than Taylor.

For his career (1977–1994), he was one of 23 players to record 1,000 points (ranking 18th). When he retired, he was first in franchise history for games played (1,111), and second in goals, assists, and points.

He held the games record until March 28, 2019 when he was passed by Dustin Brown, who had been selected by Taylor in the 2003 draft (Brown was later passed by Anže Kopitar in 2023). He is the lowest-drafted player to net 1,000 career points, drafted in the 15th round (210th overall) of the 1975 NHL draft and appeared in four NHL All-Star Games in 1981, 1982, 1986 and 1994. The Los Angeles Kings retired the number 18 in his honour on April 3, 1995.

== International career ==
Taylor represented Canada in the Ice Hockey World Championships in 1983, 1985 and 1986. During those tournaments, he recorded 7 goals and 10 assists for 17 points in 30 games. Canada won bronze in 1983 and 1986 and also won a silver in 1985.

== Front office ==
On April 27, 1997, Taylor was hired on a four-year contract to serve as the general manager and vice president of the Los Angeles Kings in a shuffle that saw Sam McMaster fired and Rogie Vachon re-assigned from being chief hockey operations officer. In the 2000-01 season, Taylor made the difficult decision to trade away longtime Kings defenseman Rob Blake to the Colorado Avalanche for Adam Deadmarsh after Blake would not sign a contract extension; the result was one of the deepest playoff runs in a decade as Deadmarsh was pivotal to the Kings upset of the Detroit Red Wings in six games during the first round, followed by the Kings taking the eventual champions Avalanche to seven games. The following year saw him granted an extension through to the 2005–06 season. Taylor also drafted future Kings superstars which include Anže Kopitar, Dustin Brown and Jonathan Quick, whom would be key to the Kings winning Stanley Cups in 2012 and 2014.

On April 18, 2006, Taylor was fired. With a record of 290–261–74–31, Taylor was the winningest general manager in Kings’ history.

On July 31, 2007, he was hired by the Dallas Stars to serve as the team's director of player personnel, where he served for three seasons. In 2008, he was named to serve as a member of the Clarkson University board of trustees.

Taylor was hired by the St. Louis Blues on July 1, 2010 to serve as the team's director of player personnel. He was promoted to become their vice president of hockey operations in 2012. He won the Stanley Cup with the Blues in 2019 and returned to his hometown of Levack with the cup; months later, Taylor's name was later engraved on the Cup for the first time ever.

== Personal life ==
Because of his success, Taylor is considered a hero in his hometown of Levack and the arena there features a lot of dedication to him.

Taylor has dealt with stuttering since childhood. The speech disorder once forced him to drop a college class when he discovered that an oral presentation would be required. When interviewed after games early in his professional hockey career, Taylor would attempt to conceal his stuttering by faking hyperventilation as a means of providing him with fluency. Taylor credits Los Angeles–based Speech-Language Pathologist Vivian Sheehan for assisting him in his triumph over stuttering.

Taylor and his wife Beth currently reside near Los Angeles with their two daughters, Jamie and Katie.

== Career statistics ==
=== Regular season and playoffs ===
| | | | Regular season | | | | | Playoffs |
| Season | Team | League | GP | G | A | Pts | PIM | GP | G | A | Pts | PIM |
|---|---|---|---|---|---|---|---|---|---|---|---|---|
| 1973–74 | Onaping Falls Huskies | NOJHL | 45 | 67 | 76 | 143 | — | — | — | — | — | — |
| 1973–74 | Clarkson Golden Knights | ECAC | 25 | 11 | 19 | 30 | — | — | — | — | — | — |
| 1974–75 | Clarkson Golden Knights | ECAC | 32 | 30 | 24 | 54 | — | — | — | — | — | — |
| 1975–76 | Clarkson Golden Knights | ECAC | 31 | 26 | 33 | 59 | — | — | — | — | — | — |
| 1976–77 | Clarkson Golden Knights | ECAC | 34 | 41 | 67 | 108 | — | — | — | — | — | — |
| 1976–77 | Fort Worth Texans | CHL | 7 | 2 | 4 | 6 | 6 | — | — | — | — | — |
| 1977–78 | Los Angeles Kings | NHL | 64 | 22 | 21 | 43 | 47 | 2 | 0 | 0 | 0 | 5 |
| 1978–79 | Los Angeles Kings | NHL | 78 | 43 | 48 | 91 | 124 | 2 | 0 | 0 | 0 | 2 |
| 1979–80 | Los Angeles Kings | NHL | 61 | 37 | 53 | 90 | 72 | 4 | 2 | 1 | 3 | 4 |
| 1980–81 | Los Angeles Kings | NHL | 72 | 47 | 65 | 112 | 130 | 4 | 2 | 2 | 4 | 10 |
| 1981–82 | Los Angeles Kings | NHL | 78 | 39 | 67 | 106 | 130 | 10 | 4 | 6 | 10 | 20 |
| 1982–83 | Los Angeles Kings | NHL | 46 | 21 | 37 | 58 | 76 | — | — | — | — | — |
| 1983–84 | Los Angeles Kings | NHL | 63 | 20 | 49 | 69 | 91 | — | — | — | — | — |
| 1984–85 | Los Angeles Kings | NHL | 79 | 41 | 51 | 92 | 132 | 3 | 2 | 2 | 4 | 8 |
| 1985–86 | Los Angeles Kings | NHL | 76 | 33 | 38 | 71 | 110 | — | — | — | — | — |
| 1986–87 | Los Angeles Kings | NHL | 67 | 18 | 44 | 62 | 84 | 5 | 2 | 3 | 5 | 6 |
| 1987–88 | Los Angeles Kings | NHL | 68 | 26 | 41 | 67 | 129 | 5 | 3 | 3 | 6 | 6 |
| 1988–89 | Los Angeles Kings | NHL | 70 | 26 | 37 | 63 | 80 | 11 | 1 | 5 | 6 | 19 |
| 1989–90 | Los Angeles Kings | NHL | 58 | 15 | 26 | 41 | 96 | 6 | 4 | 4 | 8 | 6 |
| 1990–91 | Los Angeles Kings | NHL | 73 | 23 | 30 | 53 | 148 | 12 | 2 | 1 | 3 | 12 |
| 1991–92 | Los Angeles Kings | NHL | 77 | 10 | 19 | 29 | 63 | 6 | 1 | 1 | 2 | 20 |
| 1992–93 | Los Angeles Kings | NHL | 48 | 6 | 9 | 15 | 49 | 22 | 3 | 5 | 8 | 31 |
| 1993–94 | Los Angeles Kings | NHL | 33 | 4 | 3 | 7 | 28 | — | — | — | — | — |
| NHL totals | | | 1,111 | 431 | 638 | 1,069 | 1,589 | 92 | 26 | 33 | 59 | 149 |

=== International ===
| Year | Team | Event | GP | G | A | Pts | PIM |
|---|---|---|---|---|---|---|---|
| 1983 | Canada | WC | 10 | 1 | 4 | 5 | 4 |
| 1985 | Canada | WC | 10 | 3 | 2 | 5 | 4 |
| 1986 | Canada | WC | 10 | 3 | 4 | 7 | 12 |
| Senior totals | | | 30 | 7 | 10 | 17 | 20 |

== Awards and honors ==
| Award | Year |
|---|---|
College
| All-ECAC First Team | 1976–77 |
| AHCA East All-American | 1976–77 |
NHL
| All-Star Game | 1981, 1982, 1986, 1994 |
| Second All-Star team | 1981 |
| Bill Masterton Memorial Trophy | 1991 |
| King Clancy Memorial Trophy | 1991 |

== See also ==
- List of NHL players with 1,000 games played
- List of NHL players with 1,000 points

Awards and achievements
| Preceded by Peter Brown | ECAC Hockey Player of the Year; 1976–77 | Succeeded by Lance Nethery |
| Preceded by Tom Ross | NCAA Ice Hockey Scoring Champion; 1976–77 | Succeeded by Mike Eaves |
| Preceded by Gord Kluzak | Winner of the Bill Masterton Memorial Trophy; 1991 | Succeeded by Mark Fitzpatrick |
| Preceded by Kevin Lowe | Winner of the King Clancy Memorial Trophy; 1991 | Succeeded by Ray Bourque |
Sporting positions
| Preceded by Phil Latreille | NCAA Single-Season Points Leader; 1977–1985 (shared with Phil Latreille) | Succeeded by Bill Watson |
| Preceded by Terry Ruskowski | Los Angeles Kings captains 1985–1989 | Succeeded by Wayne Gretzky |
| Preceded by Sam McMaster | General manager of the Los Angeles Kings; 1997–2006 | Succeeded by Dean Lombardi |
