= Dustin Brown (ice hockey) =

American ice hockey player (born 1984)

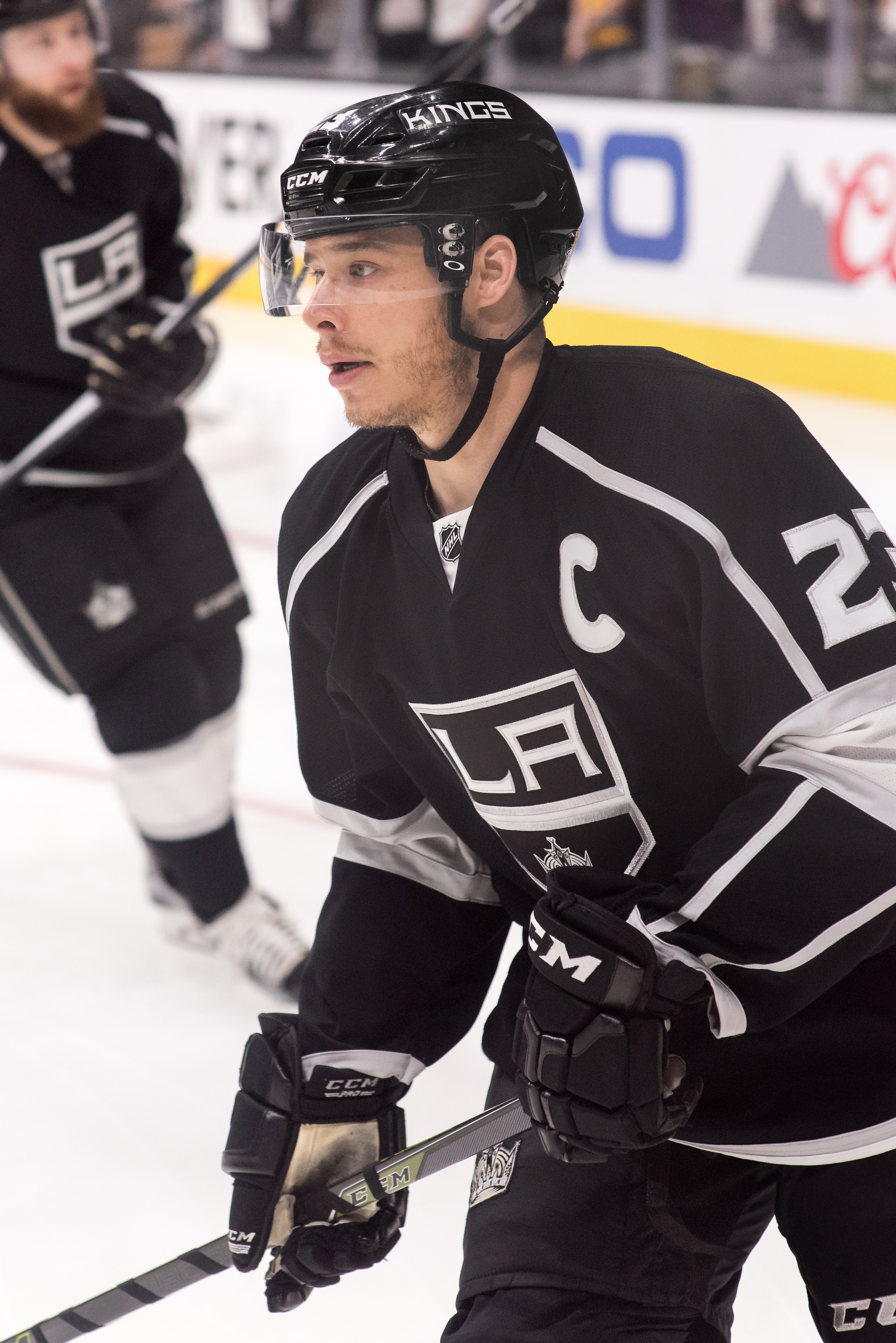
- Brown with the Los Angeles Kings in April 2016
- Born: November 4, 1984 (age 42) Ithaca, New York, U.S.
- Height: 6 ft 0 in (183 cm)
- Weight: 205 lb (93 kg; 14 st 9 lb)
- Position: Right wing
- Shot: Right
- Played for: Los Angeles Kings; ZSC Lions
- National team: United States
- NHL draft: 13th overall, 2003; Los Angeles Kings
- Playing career: 2003–2022

Dustin James Brown (born November 4, 1984) is an American former professional ice hockey player. Brown played as a right winger and spent his entire NHL career with the Los Angeles Kings of the National Hockey League (NHL), who drafted him 13th overall in the 2003 NHL entry draft. He served as team captain from 2008 to 2016; during this time he led the Kings to two Stanley Cup championships in 2012 and 2014, becoming the first Kings captain and second American captain (behind Derian Hatcher) to win the Stanley Cup. During the 2012–13 NHL lockout, he played for ZSC Lions in the Swiss National League A (NLA).

Brown was noted for his physical playing style, consistently ranking among NHL leaders in hits and penalties drawn, and his reserved, lead-by-example approach to his captaincy of the Kings.

Internationally, Brown has represented the United States at three World Championships, winning a bronze medal in 2004, and two World Junior Championships. He won a silver medal as an alternate captain of the United States at the 2010 Winter Olympics. Brown received the 2011 NHL Foundation Player Award for his extensive charity work in the Los Angeles community, and the Mark Messier Leadership Award in 2014.

== Playing career ==
=== Junior career ===
After playing hockey at Ithaca High School for two years, Brown left his hometown to play junior hockey at age 16. He was drafted in the second round, 26th overall, by the Guelph Storm in the Ontario Hockey League (OHL) Priority Selection Draft. Brown played three seasons for Guelph, scoring 194 points in 174 games. He was drafted by the Los Angeles Kings in the first round, 13 overall, in 2003.

As a junior in the Ontario Hockey League, Brown won the Bobby Smith Trophy as the OHL’s Scholastic Player of the Year in three straight seasons (beginning in 2000-01). He also won the Canadian Hockey League’s Scholastic Player of the Year in 2002-03, his last season in junior hockey.

=== Los Angeles Kings (2003–2022) ===
==== 2003–2008: Early seasons ====
Brown signed a three-year entry-level contract with the Kings and made the Kings' 2003–04 team out of training camp. His first NHL game was October 9, 2003, against the Detroit Red Wings. Brown saw fourth-line ice time in his rookie year, and he scored his first NHL goal on November 22, 2003, in a 2–0 win over the Colorado Avalanche. He managed just 1 goal and 5 points in 31 games before his season was cut short by a high ankle sprain. Nonetheless, Brown's physicality made a favorable impression with the Kings' coaching staff.

The following season was cancelled due to the NHL lockout. Brown was assigned to the Manchester Monarchs, the Kings' American Hockey League (AHL) affiliate, in order to develop his offensive game. He performed well in Manchester, averaging nearly a point per game and readying himself for an expanded NHL role.

With the lockout over, and NHL play resuming in 2005–06, Brown cemented his place on the team. As a 21-year-old checking forward, he managed 28 points in 79 games. More impressively, he led the team (and ranked 13th in the NHL) with 175 hits, and he drew the second most penalties in the NHL despite his limited ice time. A restricted free agent at the end of the year, Brown signed a two-year contract before the start of the 2006–07 season.

Brown's third season saw an expansion in his role, as he was placed on the top line with star rookie center Anže Kopitar. The two young forwards became frequent linemates, as Brown's hitting abilities and willingness to shoot complemented Kopitar's dynamic passing and puck possession skills. Receiving the third-most ice time among Kings forwards, Brown responded with career-highs of 17 goals and 46 points in 81 games. Brown also received the most short-handed ice time among Kings forwards, a sign of his growing defensive reliability. He finished second in the NHL in hits, the first of six consecutive years that he ranked top three in the NHL in that category.

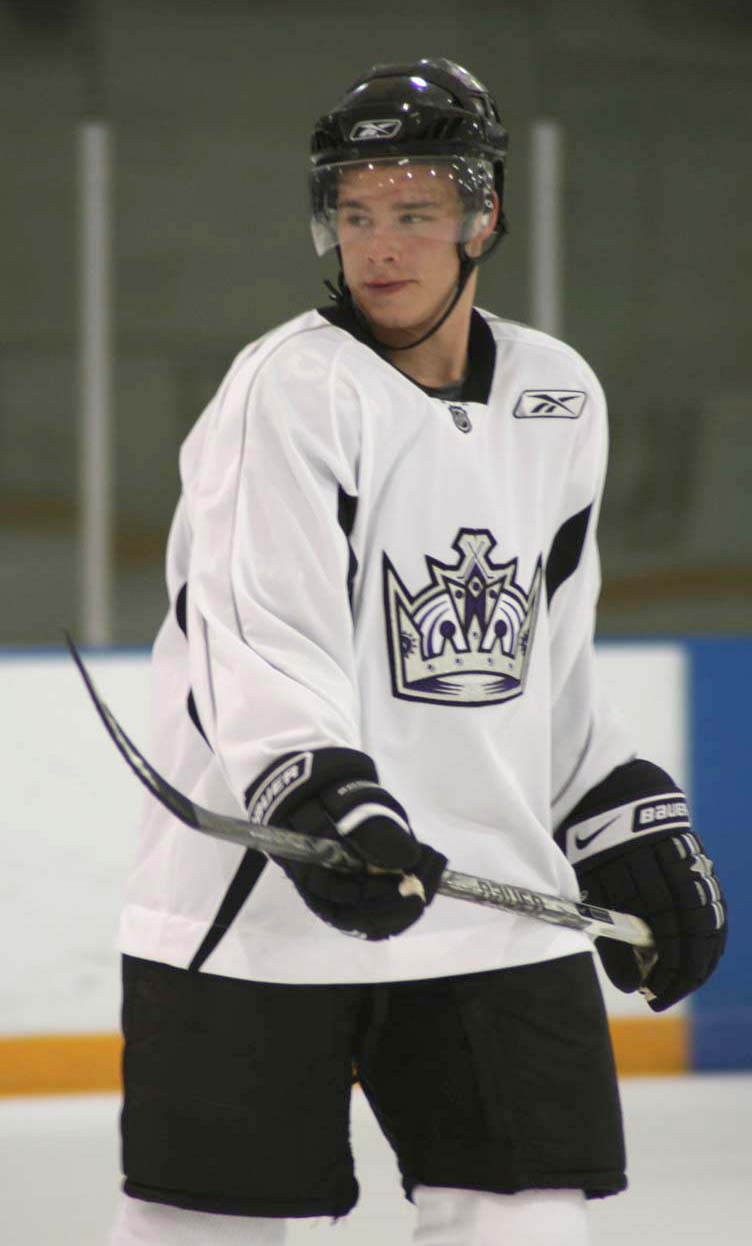
Dustin Brown during practice in September 2007.

On October 26, 2007, shortly after the start of the 2007–08 season, the Kings and Brown agreed to a six-year, $19.05 million contract extension that ran through the 2013–14 season. The contract was signed a full year before Brown hit restricted free agency, partially because young forwards Dustin Penner of the Anaheim Ducks and Thomas Vanek of the Buffalo Sabres had just received lucrative offer sheets in restricted free agency, and the Kings did not want Brown to receive one. Brown produced his best offensive season that year. Continuing to play top-line minutes with Kopitar, he recorded 33 goals and 60 points. To date, that season remains the only year Brown has managed to reach the 30-goal plateau. Despite his personal success, the rebuilding Kings missed the Stanley Cup playoffs for the fifth-straight year.

==== 2008–2016: Stanley Cup championships and captaincy ====
The Kings named Brown the 13th captain in team history on October 8, 2008, just after the start of the 2008–09 season. Brown's appointment filled the vacancy created when prior captain Rob Blake left the Kings in free agency to sign with the San Jose Sharks on July 3, 2008. Just 23 years old when he assumed the captaincy, Brown became the youngest captain and the only American captain in Kings history. Head coach Terry Murray pointed to Brown's work ethic and commitment to the Kings to explain the decision, saying Brown "shows that he cares tremendously about this team, about winning every night. I just want him to follow through with that, and he will because that's his personality. Just keep blazing that trail, and players on the team will follow". Kings management was impressed by Brown's emergence as a vocal leader in the locker room, especially after the departure of veteran presences Mattias Norström and Rob Blake. On the ice, Brown's numbers dipped slightly from 2007–08, in part because of an 8.2% shooting percentage, his lowest since his rookie season. However, his 292 shots led the team, and his 24 goals were third. Brown was chosen to represent the Western Conference at the 2009 All-Star Game. The Kings missed the playoffs for a franchise-worst sixth straight year.

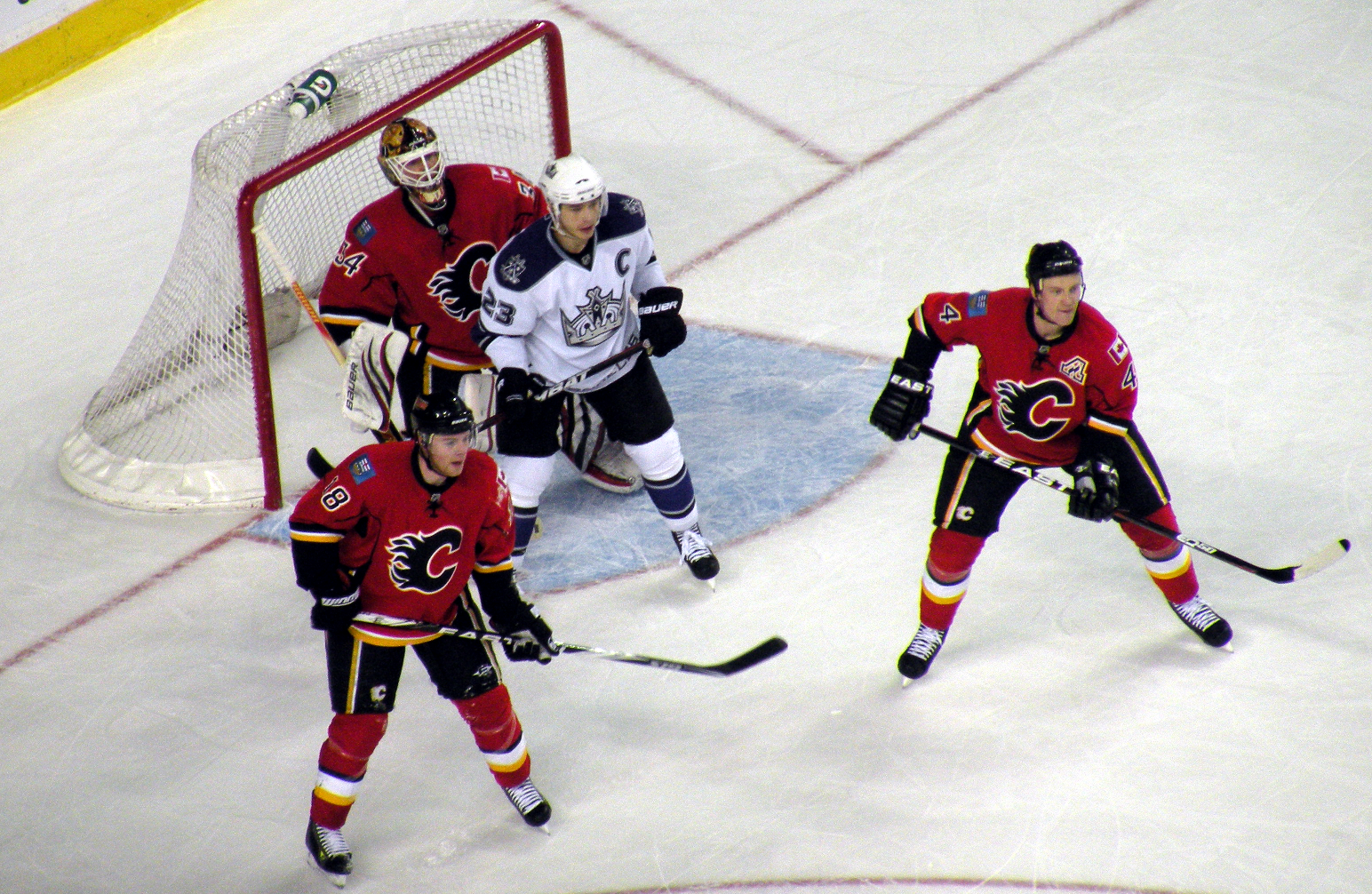
Brown screens Calgary Flames goaltender Miikka Kiprusoff in February 2011

Brown again posted solid numbers in 2009–10, playing all 82 games for the first time and registering 24 goals and a career-high 32 assists. He scored his 100th NHL goal on January 14, 2010, against the Anaheim Ducks. With Brown leading a rapidly improving young core that included center Anze Kopitar, defenseman Drew Doughty and goaltender Jonathan Quick, the Kings finally snapped the eight-year playoff drought after clinching the sixth seed in the West to qualify for a playoff spot. Brown had one goal and four assists in six games as the Kings lost in the first round of the 2010 playoffs to the third seeded Vancouver Canucks.

Brown and the Kings entered the 2010–11 season with higher expectations. Brown again played all 82 games and scored 28 goals and 29 assists for 57 points. Anže Kopitar's late season ankle injury forced the Kings to settle for a seventh-seeded finish in the Western Conference and a matchup with the second-seeded San Jose Sharks in the first round of the 2011 playoffs. The Kings lost in six games for the second straight year, with Brown recording two points (a goal and an assist) in the series.

Brown began the 2011–12 season on a line with newly acquired center Mike Richards, but was shuffled throughout the lineup for most of the season. He maintained his consistent production, topping 20 goals and 50 points for the fifth-straight year. However, along with the rest of the Kings, he struggled to score in the first half of the season. Head coach Terry Murray was fired midway through the season, and as the Kings fell further out of the playoff picture, they were rumored to be listening to trade offers for Brown. New head coach Darryl Sutter called the Brown-Kopitar tandem "stale" and said Brown was not playing the "straight-line, up-and-down, go-to-the-net, shoot-the-puck, run-over-people" style Brown needed to be effective. Brown's scoring pace picked up amidst the trade rumors, and he scored three goals on Corey Crawford and an assist on a Willie Mitchell goal in the last game before the NHL trade deadline, a 4–0 win over the Chicago Blackhawks on February 25, 2012. The Kings retained Brown, who responded with 11 points in the nine games following the trade deadline. Brown later said he was playing with "a chip on his shoulder" and "whether those rumors are true or not, they're still out there, it gives you maybe a bit more motivation". With Brown producing and the trade-deadline acquisition of Jeff Carter, the Kings were one of the highest-scoring NHL teams down the stretch and made the playoffs as an eighth seed. After moving up-and-down the lineup for most of the season, Brown found stability playing on the first line with Anže Kopitar and Justin Williams. That line would remain intact throughout the entire 2012 playoffs. Brown recorded four goals and one assist for five points in the first round against the back-to-back Presidents' Trophy-winning Vancouver Canucks, including two shorthanded goals on Canucks' goaltender Roberto Luongo in a 4–2 game 2 win. Brown is the first and only player as of 2022 with two shorthanded goals in a playoff game. In game 3, he delivered a devastating open-ice check to Canucks center and captain Henrik Sedin directly in front of the Vancouver' bench. The hit left Sedin uninjured but dazed on the ice for several seconds until fellow Canuck' center Manny Malhotra, who was on the bench with his linemates at the time of the play, had to guide Henrik off the ice and on to the bench. Brown later scored the game-winning goal in the third period. Many observers, including TSN's Bob McKenzie and Sports Illustrated' Michael Farber, called the hit the decisive moment in the series. The Kings upset the heavily favored top-seeded Canucks in five games, and then recorded the first sweep in franchise history over the second seeded St. Louis Blues in the second round. Brown registered two goals and four assists in the series. Both of his goals came in the decisive game 4, a 3–1 Kings victory. The Kings then beat the third seeded Arizona Coyotes in five games in the Western Conference finals. Brown scored the game-winning goal in game 1 of that series and did not score again until game 6 of the 2012 Stanley Cup Final against the sixth seeded New Jersey Devils, although he did manage five assists in that span. After being benched for the final minutes of a game 5 loss, Brown produced three points in game 6 to secure the Kings' first-ever Stanley Cup. He scored the first of three goals on a five-minute power play, and shortly afterwards, fired a shot that Jeff Carter deflected into the net for the eventual Cup-winning goal. Later, he assisted on another Carter goal. The Kings defeated the Devils 6–1, making Brown the second American-born captain to lead a team to a Stanley Cup championship and the Kings the second California-based team to win the Stanley Cup. With eight goals and 12 assists for 20 points in 20 games, Brown tied teammate Anže Kopitar for the lead in overall playoff point total.

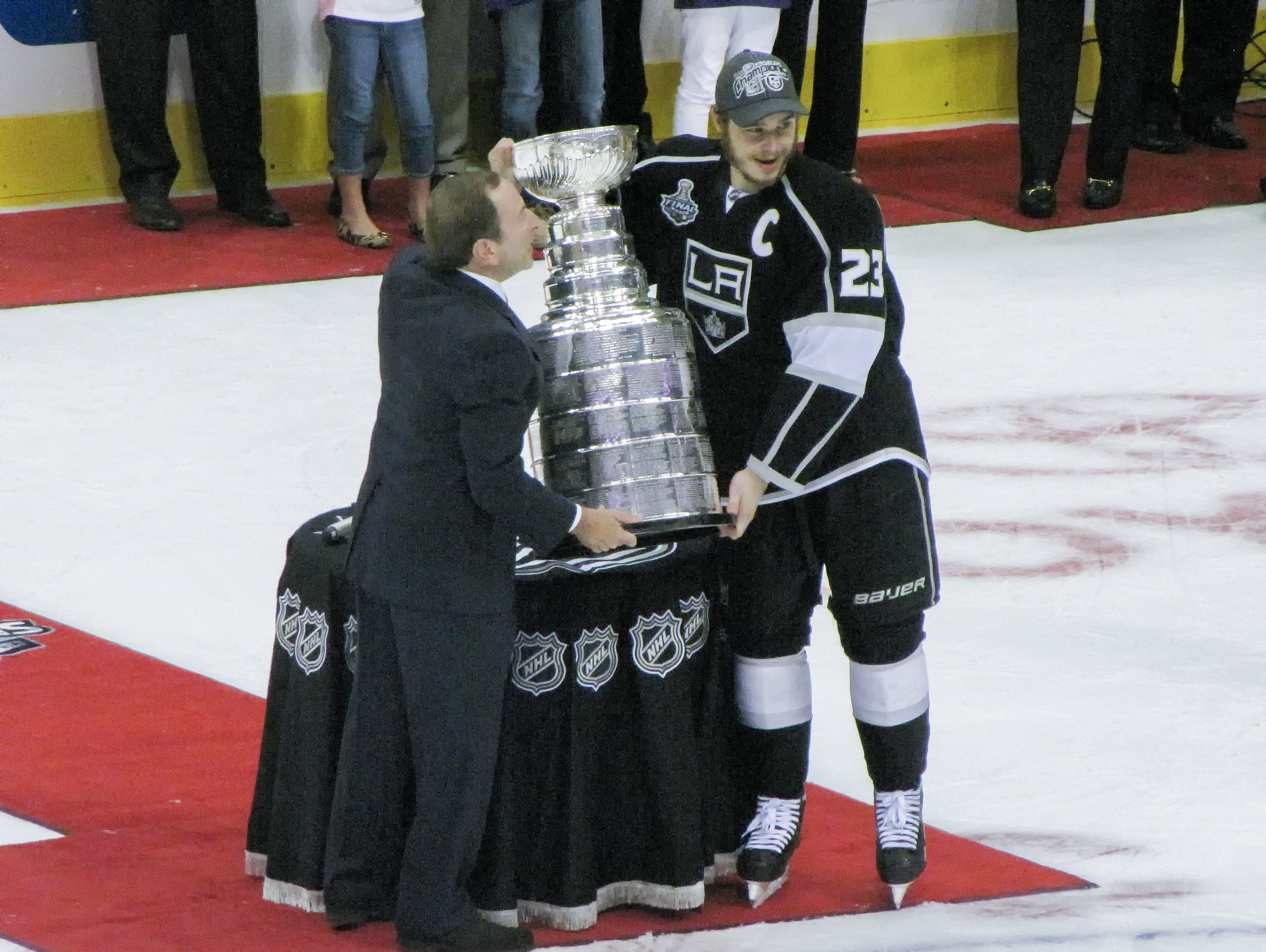
NHL Commissioner Gary Bettman presents the Stanley Cup to Dustin Brown in June 2012.

On July 28, 2012, Brown had his "Day with the Cup". Each year after a team has won the Stanley Cup, players, front office and hockey operation staff each get a day with the Stanley Cup. Brown hinted on the Tonight Show with Jay Leno he would bring the Cup back home. He did just that, bringing it to Ithaca High School in late July. During the lockout-shortened season, Brown finished shortened regular season with 18 goals and 11 assists for 29 points in 46 games. The Kings reached the Western Conference finals for a second-straight year, but fell in five games to the Presidents' Trophy-winning and eventual Stanley Cup champion Chicago Blackhawks.

On July 18, 2013, the Kings signed Brown to an eight-year, $47 million contract extension. In the 2014 Stanley Cup Final, Brown led the Kings to another Stanley Cup title, despite facing some criticism for more muted contributions on the team's run to the title. In the Cup Final against the New York Rangers, Brown scored the overtime winner in game 2 to give the Kings a 5–4 victory and a 2–0 series lead, and he scored again during the Kings' 2–1 loss in game 4. At the conclusion of the 2013–14 season, Brown was awarded the Mark Messier Leadership Award "in recognition of his commitment and service to charities in his community".

On November 26, 2014, Brown recorded his 200th NHL goal in a 4–0 Kings win over the Minnesota Wild.

After the Kings missed the playoffs entirely for the first time since 2009 in 2015, Brown and the Kings returned to the playoffs in 2016 only to fall in the first round in five games to the San Jose Sharks.

==== 2016–2022: Later years ====
Following back-to-back seasons of scoring less than 30 points, Brown was replaced as the Kings captain by Anže Kopitar on June 16, 2016. Speaking on the decision to have his captaincy stripped, Brown stated, "I understand the decision and I respect the decision. Part of my problem was how it was handled. It just put me in an awkward spot."

The 2017–18 season marked a resurgence for Brown. After earning 36 points the season prior, Brown managed 28 goals and 33 assists for a career-high 61 points in 81 contests played. On December 21, 2017, Brown played in his 1,000th career NHL game. The Kings defeated the Colorado Avalanche 2–1 in overtime, where Brown scored the game-winning goal. On April 5, 2018, Brown scored four goals, including the overtime winner, against the Minnesota Wild.

In the pandemic-shortened 2020–21 season opener in a 4–3 OT loss against the Minnesota Wild on January 13, 2021, Brown recorded his 300th NHL goal.

Brown was eventually re-promoted to alternate captain since his demotion, and announced on April 28, 2022 before the 2021–22 season finale against the Vancouver Canucks that he would retire after the completion of the 2022 Stanley Cup playoffs, for which his Kings team qualified for the first time since 2018. At the time of the announcement, Brown had 28 points (9 goals, 19 assists) in 64 games in the 2021–22 regular season. In the season finale against the Canucks, he was named team captain for the Kings. In the 2022 playoffs, Brown's Kings would be eliminated in seven games in the first round by the Edmonton Oilers, with Brown skating in all seven appearances and recording two points, his final game was on May 14.

Brown was honored with a statue on February 11, 2023, joining Wayne Gretzky and Luc Robitaille as the only Kings players with statues. The Kings also retired his #23 jersey that night, making him the sixth King so honored.

== International play ==
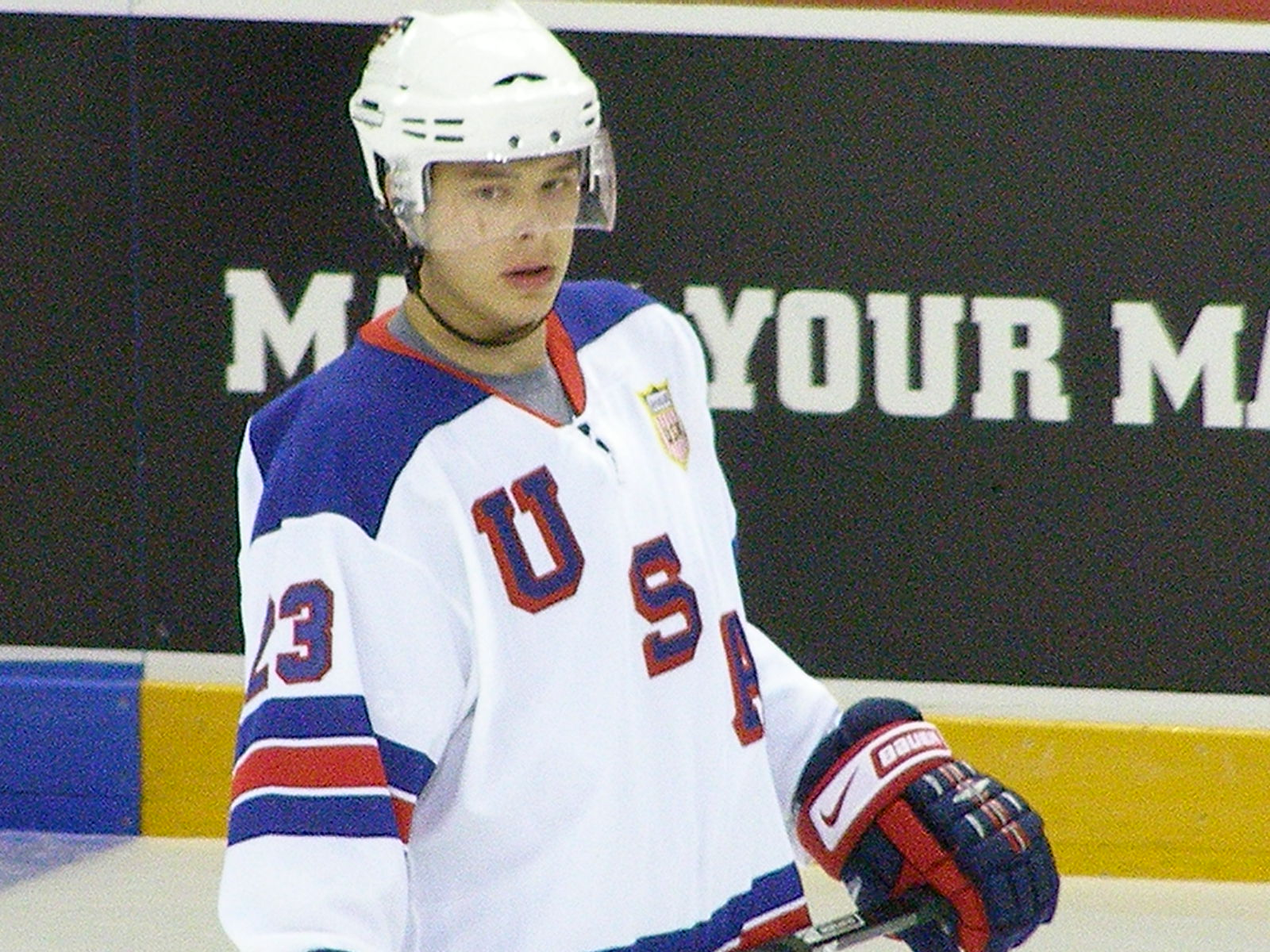
- Brown at the 2008 IIHF World Championship

Medal record

Men's ice hockey

Representing the United States

Winter Olympics
Silver medal – second place	2010 Vancouver	

World Championships
Bronze medal – third place	2004 Czech Republic	

Brown has played for the United States in multiple international tournaments. During the World Championship tournament in 2008, Brown received negative attention for a controversial hit that made contact with the head of Finnish player Jussi Jokinen as the final horn sounded.

Brown was named an alternate captain of the United States at the 2010 Winter Olympics and again in 2014.

== Style of play ==
Brown was known for his physical, north–south style of game. Brown considered himself a clean hitter: after a controversial hit on Phoenix Coyotes defenseman Michal Rozsíval in the 2012 Western Conference finals, Brown defended himself by saying, "I take pride in playing the game clean and hard. There are going to be hits that are unfortunate but still clean." Brown had never been issued a fine or suspension from the NHL Department of Player Safety until April 24, 2013, when he received two-game suspension for an illegal elbow to the head of Minnesota Wild forward Jason Pominville on April 23, 2013. Brown's former teammate Rob Blake said Brown "comes at guys straight on, face-to-face. He goes right through guys." Despite his aggressive style, Brown did not miss a game due to injury over a span of four seasons. Brown was one of the most effective NHL players at drawing penalties, having led the NHL in that category in five of seven post-lockout seasons. Brown's unparalleled success in that area led several commentators, including ex-NHL referee Kerry Fraser, to say that Brown acquired a reputation for embellishing infractions in order to draw penalties. Beyond his physicality and agitation, Brown provided a consistent offensive threat for the Kings, scoring at least 22 goals for five consecutive years. Brown played an effective two-way game and matured into an elite defensive and penalty-killing forward.

== Personal life ==
Brown has three sons Jake, Mason, Cooper and one daughter MacKenzie, with his wife Nicole and lives in Buffalo, New York. Brown had a speech impediment early in his career, which he received therapy for before his professional career. He was heavily involved in charity work in the Greater Los Angeles Area during his playing years, and was awarded the 2011 NHL Foundation Player Award for his community efforts and involvement.

== Career statistics ==
=== Regular season and playoffs ===
Bold indicates led league

			Regular season					Playoffs
Season	Team	League	GP	G	A	Pts	PIM	GP	G	A	Pts	PIM
1998–99	Ithaca High School	HS-NY	18	4	13	17	—	—	—	—	—	—
1999–00	Ithaca High School	HS-NY	24	33	21	53	—	—	—	—	—	—
2000–01	Guelph Storm	OHL	53	23	22	45	50	4	0	0	0	10
2001–02	Guelph Storm	OHL	63	41	32	73	56	9	8	5	13	14
2002–03	Guelph Storm	OHL	58	34	42	76	89	11	7	8	15	6
2003–04	Los Angeles Kings	NHL	31	1	4	5	16	—	—	—	—	—
2004–05	Manchester Monarchs	AHL	79	29	45	74	96	6	5	2	7	10
2005–06	Los Angeles Kings	NHL	79	14	14	28	80	—	—	—	—	—
2006–07	Los Angeles Kings	NHL	81	17	29	46	54	—	—	—	—	—
2007–08	Los Angeles Kings	NHL	78	33	27	60	55	—	—	—	—	—
2008–09	Los Angeles Kings	NHL	80	24	29	53	64	—	—	—	—	—
2009–10	Los Angeles Kings	NHL	82	24	32	56	41	6	1	4	5	6
2010–11	Los Angeles Kings	NHL	82	28	29	57	67	6	1	1	2	6
2011–12	Los Angeles Kings	NHL	82	22	32	54	53	20	**8**	**12**	**20**	34
2012–13	ZSC Lions	NLA	16	8	5	13	26	—	—	—	—	—
2012–13	Los Angeles Kings	NHL	46	18	11	29	22	18	3	1	4	8
2013–14	Los Angeles Kings	NHL	79	15	12	27	66	26	6	8	14	22
2014–15	Los Angeles Kings	NHL	82	11	16	27	26	—	—	—	—	—
2015–16	Los Angeles Kings	NHL	82	11	17	28	30	5	0	1	1	4
2016–17	Los Angeles Kings	NHL	80	14	22	36	22	—	—	—	—	—
2017–18	Los Angeles Kings	NHL	81	28	33	61	58	4	0	1	1	4
2018–19	Los Angeles Kings	NHL	72	22	29	51	24	—	—	—	—	—
2019–20	Los Angeles Kings	NHL	66	17	18	35	22	—	—	—	—	—
2020–21	Los Angeles Kings	NHL	49	17	14	31	18	—	—	—	—	—
2021–22	Los Angeles Kings	NHL	64	9	19	28	20	7	0	2	2	0
NHL totals			1,296	325	387	712	738	92	19	30	49	84

=== International ===
Year	Team	Event	Result	GP	G	A	Pts	PIM
2002	United States	WJC	5th	7	1	3	4	10
2003	United States	WJC	4th	7	2	2	4	10
2004	United States	WC	3rd place, bronze medalist(s)	9	1	3	4	4
2006	United States	WC	7th	7	5	2	7	10
2008	United States	WC	6th	7	5	4	9	22
2009	United States	WC	4th	9	3	5	8	8
2010	United States	OG	2nd place, silver medalist(s)	6	0	0	0	0
2014	United States	OG	4th	6	2	1	3	4
Junior totals				14	3	5	8	20
Senior totals				44	16	15	31	48

== Awards and honors ==
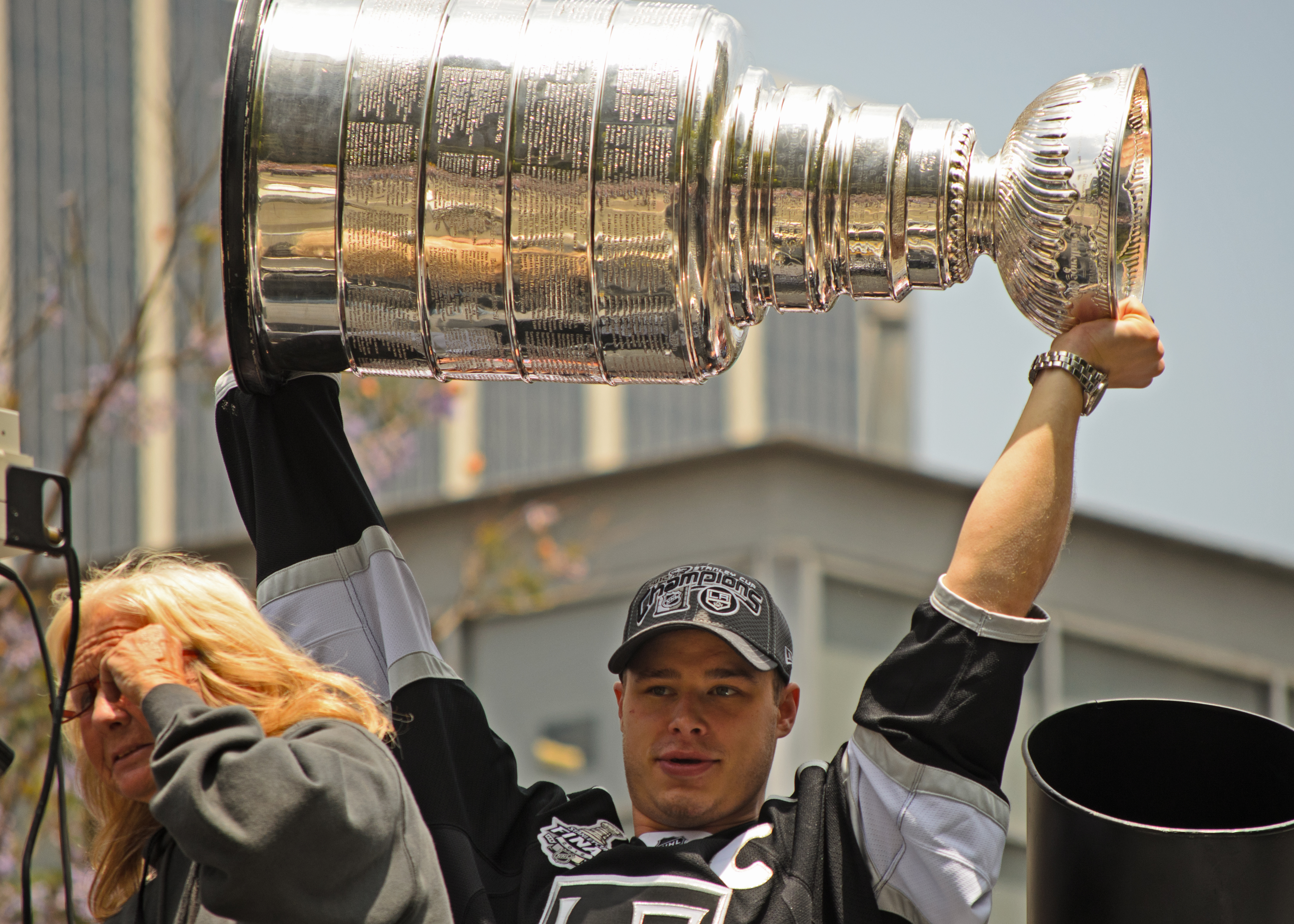
Brown hoisting the Stanley Cup at the Kings' 2012 championship parade.

Award	Year
OHL
All-Rookie Team	2001
CHL Scholastic Player of the Year	2003
NHL
All-Star Game	2009
Foundation Player Award	2011
Stanley Cup champion	2012, 2014
Mark Messier Leadership Award	2014

Awards and achievements
Preceded by Denis Grebeshkov	Los Angeles Kings first-round draft pick 2003	Succeeded by Brian Boyle
Sporting positions
Preceded by Rob Blake	Los Angeles Kings captain 2008–2016	Succeeded by Anže Kopitar
