= Peter Aubry =

- Born: May 19, 1977 (age 49) Windsor, Ontario, Canada
- Height: 6 ft 3 in (191 cm)
- Weight: 200 lb (91 kg; 14 st 4 lb)
- Position: Goaltender
- Caught: Left
- NHL draft: Undrafted
- Playing career: 2002–2011 Coaching career

Current position
- Title: Goalie coach
- Team: Edmonton Oilers
- Conference: National Hockey League

Biographical details
- Education: Mercyhurst University

Coaching career (HC unless noted)
- 2011–2014: Mercyhurst (asst)
- 2014–2015: Lake Superior State (asst)
- 2015–2023: Chicago Blackhawks (goalie)
- 2023–2025: Omaha (also)
- 2025–present: Edmonton Oilers (goalie)

Peter Aubry (born May 19, 1977) is a Canadian ice hockey coach and former professional goaltender. He is currently a Goalie coach for the Edmonton Oilers (NHL).

== Career ==
Born in Windsor, Ontario, Aubry spent four years in Mercyhurst College before turning pro in 2002, signing for the Johnstown Chiefs of the ECHL and also played three games for the American Hockey League's Saint John Flames. He had single season spells over the next two years in the United Hockey League for the Elmira Jackals and back in the ECHL with the Alaska Aces before moving to Great Britain in 2005, signing for the Cardiff Devils as their starting goalie. In 2006, Aubry signed with the Essen Mosquitoes of the 2nd Eishockey-Bundesliga before moving back to the UK, signing for the Newcastle Vipers. Aubry split 2007-08 in the ECHL with the Texas Wildcatters and back in the 2nd Bundesliga with EV Landsberg before returning to the Cardiff Devils in 2008. Aubry signed with Ducs d'Angers in France for the 2009-10 season.

Aubry is currently a developmental goaltending coach for the Chicago Blackhawks, and was named interim assistant coach of the Rockford IceHogs on November 6, 2021. In 2023, he returned to the college ranks as an associate coach at Omaha.

== Awards and honours ==
| Award | Year |
|---|---|
| All-MAAC First Team | 2000-01; 2001-02 |

Awards and achievements
| Preceded by Sean Weaver | MAAC Goaltender of the Year; 2000-01, 2001-02 | Succeeded by Brad Roberts / Eddy Ferhi |
