= Dan Mandich =

Canadian ice hockey player

- Born: June 12, 1960 (age 64); Brantford, Ontario, Canada
- Height: 6 ft 3 in (191 cm)
- Weight: 205 lb (93 kg; 14 st 9 lb)
- Position: Defence
- Shot: Right
- Played for: Minnesota North Stars
- NHL draft: Undrafted
- Playing career: 1982–1986

Dan Mandich (born June 12, 1960) is a Canadian retired professional ice hockey defenceman who played 111 games in the National Hockey League for the Minnesota North Stars between 1982 and 1985.

Mandich was born in Brantford, Ontario.

== Career statistics ==
=== Regular season and playoffs ===
			Regular season					Playoffs
Season	Team	League	GP	G	A	Pts	PIM	GP	G	A	Pts	PIM
1977–78	Windsor Spitfires	OMJHL	15	0	1	1	20	—	—	—	—	—
1978–79	Ohio State University	CCHA	38	7	18	25	126	—	—	—	—	—
1979–80	Ohio State University	CCHA	35	10	17	27	146	—	—	—	—	—
1980–81	Ohio State University	CCHA	39	20	26	46	188	—	—	—	—	—
1981–82	Ohio State University	CCHA	33	14	26	40	157	—	—	—	—	—
1981–82	Nashville South Stars	CHL	16	2	5	7	24	3	0	0	0	26
1982–83	Birmingham South Stars	CHL	6	0	4	4	18	—	—	—	—	—
1982–83	Minnesota North Stars	NHL	67	3	4	7	169	7	0	0	0	2
1983–84	Salt Lake Golden Eagles	CHL	3	2	2	4	13	—	—	—	—	—
1983–84	Minnesota North Stars	NHL	31	2	7	9	77	—	—	—	—	—
1984–85	Minnesota North Stars	NHL	10	0	0	0	32	—	—	—	—	—
1985–86	Springfield Indians	AHL	3	0	0	0	4	—	—	—	—	—
1985–86	Minnesota North Stars	NHL	3	0	0	0	25	—	—	—	—	—
NHL totals			111	5	11	16	303	7	0	0	0	2

== Awards and honours ==
Award	Year
All-CCHA First Team	1980-81
