= Eddy Ferhi =

French ice hockey player

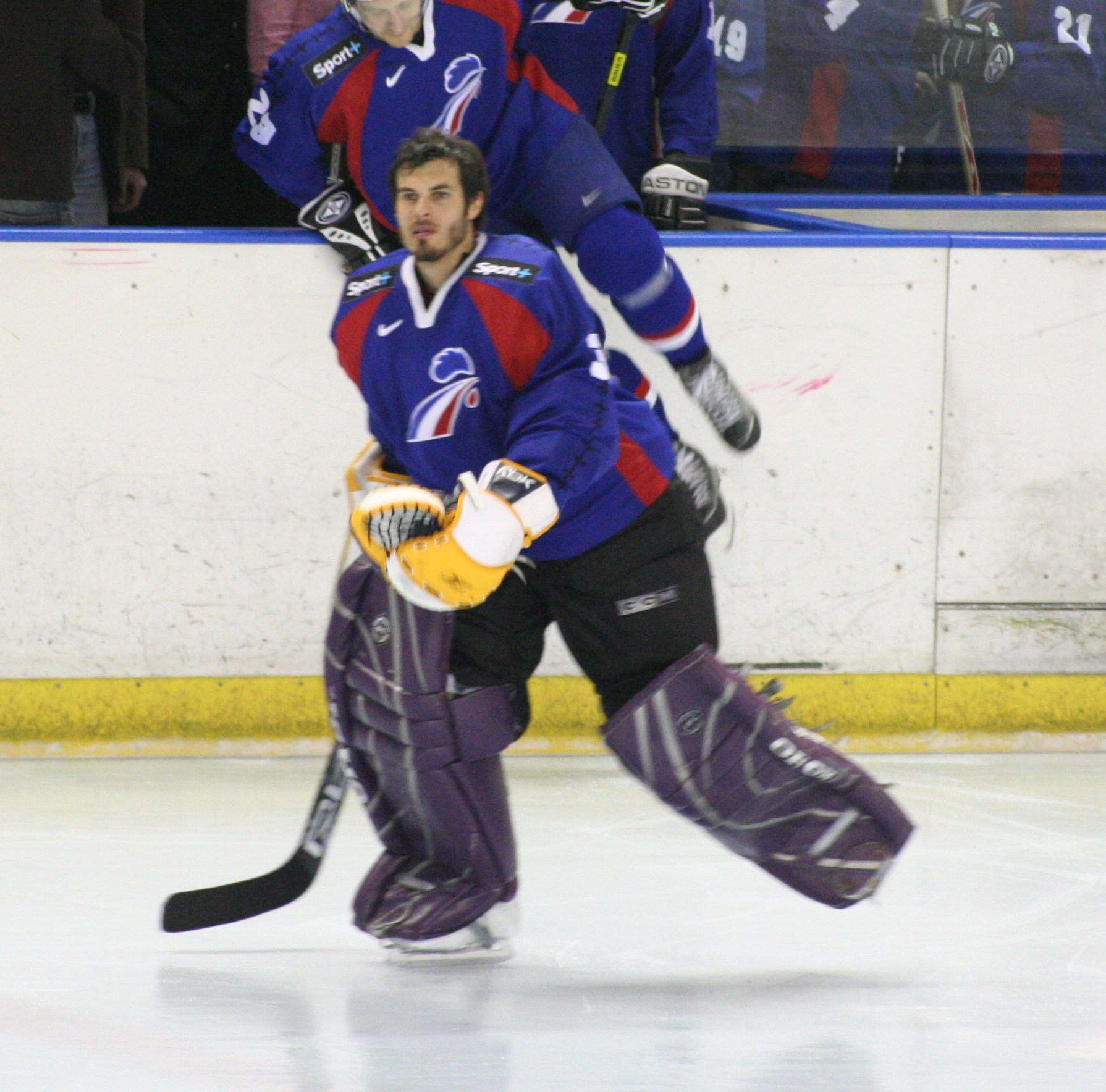
- Born: 26 November 1979 (age 45); Charenton-le-Pont, France
- Height: 6 ft 2 in (188 cm)
- Weight: 179 lb (81 kg; 12 st 11 lb)
- Position: Goalie
- Caught: Left
- Played for: Cincinnati Mighty Ducks; Anglet Hormadi Élite; Brûleurs de loups
- National team: France
- Playing career: 2003–2014; 2016–2017

Eddy Ferhi (born 26 November 1979) is a French retired professional ice hockey goaltender who participated at the 2010 IIHF World Championship as a member of the France National men's ice hockey team.

== Awards and honours ==
Award	Year
All-MAAC Second Team	2000-01
All-MAAC Second Team	2001-02
All-MAAC First Team	2002-03

Awards and achievements
Preceded by Peter Aubry	MAAC Goaltender of the Year; 2002-03; Shared With; Brad Roberts	Succeeded by Award Discontinued
