= Victor Posa =

Italian ice hockey player

- Born: November 5, 1966 (age 60) Bari, Italy
- Height: 6 ft 0 in (183 cm)
- Weight: 195 lb (88 kg; 13 st 13 lb)
- Position: Defence
- Shot: Left
- Played for: Chicago Black Hawks; Rotterdam Panda's
- NHL draft: 137th overall, 1985; Chicago Black Hawks
- Playing career: 1986–1996

Victor Posa (born November 5, 1966) is an Italian-born Canadian former ice hockey defenceman. He played two games in the National Hockey League with the Chicago Black Hawks during the 1985–86 season. The rest of his career, which lasted from 1986 to 1996, was spent in various minor leagues

== Biography ==
Posa was born in Bari, Italy. He played Junior Hockey in the Ontario Hockey League for the Toronto Marlboros and also played college hockey for the University of Wisconsin. He was drafted 137th overall by the Chicago Black Hawks in the 1985 NHL entry draft and played two games for them in the 1985–86 season. He currently lives in Grand Blanc, Michigan. His sons Saverio and Benito both played professional hockey as well. Posa appeared on Season 8 Episode 10 of Dragons Den, presenting a new skate guard product.

== Career statistics ==
=== Regular season and playoffs ===
			Regular season					Playoffs
Season	Team	League	GP	G	A	Pts	PIM	GP	G	A	Pts	PIM
1982–83	Henry Carr Crusaders	MetJBHL	35	2	16	18	178	—	—	—	—	—
1982–83	Markham Waxers	OJHL	1	0	1	1	0	—	—	—	—	—
1983–84	Henry Carr Crusaders	MetJBHL	25	16	21	37	139	—	—	—	—	—
1984–85	University of Wisconsin	WCHA	33	1	5	6	47	—	—	—	—	—
1985–86	Chicago Black Hawks	NHL	2	0	0	0	2	—	—	—	—	—
1985–86	Toronto Marlboros	OHL	48	28	34	62	116	—	—	—	—	—
1986–87	Nova Scotia Oilers	AHL	2	1	0	1	2	—	—	—	—	—
1986–87	Saginaw Generals	IHL	61	13	27	40	203	7	1	0	1	34
1987–88	Saginaw Hawks	IHL	2	0	0	0	0	—	—	—	—	—
1987–88	Flint Spirits	IHL	9	1	0	1	36	—	—	—	—	—
1987–88	Peoria Rivermen	IHL	10	0	2	2	106	—	—	—	—	—
1988–89	Carolina Thunderbirds	ECHL	10	4	4	8	93	—	—	—	—	—
1988–89	Flint Spirits	IHL	3	0	0	0	21	—	—	—	—	—
1990–91	Richmond Renegades	ECHL	20	4	9	13	102	—	—	—	—	—
1990–91	Winston-Salem Thunderbirds	ECHL	9	1	4	5	41	—	—	—	—	—
1990–91	Rotterdam Panda's	NED	1	0	0	0	32	—	—	—	—	—
1991–92	Michigan Falcons	CoHL	37	14	40	54	131	3	0	2	2	8
1992–93	Detroit Falcons	CoHL	39	15	26	41	188	6	0	1	1	30
1993–94	Huntsville Blast	ECHL	9	1	3	4	33	3	0	1	1	2
1995–96	Winston-Salem Mammoths	SHL	21	4	5	9	36	9	3	3	6	41
IHL totals			85	14	29	45	366	7	1	0	1	34
NHL totals			2	0	0	0	2	—	—	—	—	—
