= Jeff Cooper (ice hockey) =

Canadian ice hockey player (born 1962)

- Born: June 12, 1962 (age 64) Nepean, Ontario, Canada
- Height: 5 ft 10 in (178 cm)
- Weight: 178 lb (81 kg; 12 st 10 lb)
- Position: Goaltender
- Played for: Colgate; Baltimore Skipjacks; Muskegon Lumberjacks; New Haven Nighthawks; Saginaw Hawks; Indianapolis Ice
- Playing career: 1981–1990
- Coaching career

Biographical details
- Education: Colgate

Coaching career (HC unless noted)
- 2009–2014: Vermont (goaltending)

Jeffrey D. Cooper is a Canadian retired ice hockey goaltender who was an All-American for Colgate.

== Career ==
Cooper arrived at Colgate University and joined the ice hockey team a year after making its first ever NCAA Tournament appearance. He played as a backup in his freshman season and transitioned into the starting role as a sophomore. Cooper was so vital for the defense that he was named as the team's best defensive player for three consecutive years. Unfortunately, Colgate's offense didn't keep pace with the defense and the team finished 10th in ECAC Hockey, missing the postseason entirely in Cooper's first year as a starter.

In Cooper's junior season, the offense was still rather paltry but he and the defense played well enough to give the team just the second 20-win season in program history. He set program records for wins (18), games played (32), and saves (944) and got the Red Raiders back into the playoffs, albeit for just one game. As a senior he played nearly as well, setting a program career record with his 6th shoutout and was named an All-American.

After graduating, Cooper signed a contract with the Pittsburgh Penguins and began playing in their farm system. After an unspectacular season with the Baltimore Skipjacks, Cooper had his breakout campaign with the Muskegon Lumberjacks in 1987. He tied for the league lead with a 3.30 goals against average and was named as a First Team All-Star while helping Muskegon win their conference. Unfortunately, in the postseason the team decided to use Frank Pietrangelo as the starter and Cooper played in just one playoff game as the team marched all the way to the finals. Cooper was never able to recapture the magic he had found in 1987 and played for four different minor league teams over the next three seasons, mostly as a backup. He retired after the 1990 season.

In 1998, Cooper was inducted into the Colgate Athletic Hall of Fame. more than a decade later he became the goaltending coach for the Vermont women's team, resigning in 2014 after the team posted its first 10+ win season.

== Statistics ==
=== Regular season and playoffs ===
			Regular season									Playoffs
Season	Team	League	GP	W	L	T	MIN	GA	SO	GAA	SV%	GP	W	L	MIN	GA	SO	GAA	SV%
1979–80	Gloucester Rangers	CJHL	26	—	—	—	—	—	—	3.71	—	—	—	—	—	—	—	—	—
1980–81	Gloucester Rangers	CJHL	36	—	—	—	—	—	—	3.68	—	—	—	—	—	—	—	—	—
1981–82	Colgate	ECAC Hockey	10	—	—	—	—	—	1	3.71	—	—	—	—	—	—	—	—	—
1982–83	Colgate	ECAC Hockey	26	—	—	—	—	—	0	4.04	—	—	—	—	—	—	—	—	—
1983–84	Colgate	ECAC Hockey	32	18	—	—	1873	121	2	3.87	.886	—	—	—	—	—	—	—	—
1984–85	Colgate	ECAC Hockey	31	—	—	—	—	—	3	3.71	—	—	—	—	—	—	—	—	—
1985–86	Baltimore Skipjacks	AHL	23	6	13	0	1099	77	2	4.20	.867	—	—	—	—	—	—	—	—
1986–87	Muskegon Lumberjacks	IHL	45	23	21	1	2673	147	2	3.30	.889	1	—	—	—	—	—	—	—
1987–88	New Haven Nighthawks	AHL	9	1	6	0	485	37	0	4.58	.852	—	—	—	—	—	—	—	—
1987–88	Muskegon Lumberjacks	IHL	21	11	5	4	1195	80	0	4.02	.874	5	—	—	—	—	—	—	—
1988–89	Muskegon Lumberjacks	IHL	7	3	2	2	428	31	0	4.35	—	—	—	—	—	—	—	—	—
1988–89	Saginaw Hawks	IHL	4	1	3	0	226	16	0	4.25	—	—	—	—	—	—	—	—	—
1988–89	Indianapolis Ice	IHL	9	3	6	0	491	32	0	3.91	—	—	—	—	—	—	—	—	—
1989–90	Indianapolis Ice	IHL	1	—	—	—	40	4	0	6.00	.778	—	—	—	—	—	—	—	—
NCAA totals			99	49	—	—	—	—	6	—	—	—	—	—	—	—	—	—	—
IHL totals			87	41	37	7	5053	310	2	3.68	—	6	—	—	—	—	—	—	—

== Awards and honors ==
Award	Year
All-ECAC Hockey First Team	1984–85
AHCA East Second-Team All-American	1984–85
IHL First-Team All-Star	1986–87
