= Boston Bruins Alumni Hockey Team =

Barnstorming sports team

- City: Boston, Massachusetts
- League: Independent barnstormer team
- Home arena: Warrior Ice Arena (capacity: 700)
- President: Frank Simonetti

The Boston Bruins Alumni Hockey Team is an independent barnstorming hockey team located in Boston, Massachusetts. Its roster consists entirely of retired National Hockey League players, mostly former members of the Bruins, serving as a non-profit organization. The team is operated by the Boston Bruins Alumni Association. The team has raised over $15 million in support of local organization and youth hockey programs.

== History ==
The team plays opponents spans from various local organization members, local college alumni teams and occasionally other NHL alumni teams. These events usually benefit local charities around the New England area. Their uniforms are identical to the classic black and yellow Bruins jerseys. The Bruins alumni organization was founded in 1967 but did start actively playing games till the 2010s.

One of the key initiatives of the Boston Bruins Alumni is to fund-raise and support their local charities and fundraisers along with hosting their own hockey clinics. The group also partners with the Bruins charity foundation which takes part in an annual bowling tournament in Tewkesbury Massachusetts.

In 2007 Rick Middleton became the President of Boston Bruins Alumni (a position he held till 2022). During his tenure the team grew to play over 30 benefit games annually to help raise funds for over 30 different organizations.

In 2015 the team played against the Montreal Canadiens alumni team at Gillette Stadium ahead of the 2016 Winter Classic. The roster featured prominent star players such as Ray Bourque, Cam Neely and Terry O’Reilly. In January 2016 the team played one of its first games in Canada vs. the Perth Blue Wings.

In 2020 the team only played 10 games due to the Covid-19 Pandemic, however they still made charitable donations in the New England area. They also launched Bruins Alumni Tv where they stream their games.

In 2023 the team named Warrior ice (the Bruins practice rink) their official home arena.

In October of 2025 the team played a special game in Lewiston to honor the 2023 Lewiston shootings victims. On December 8 the team faced the cast of Shoresy at the TD Garden in one of their biggest games with over 10,000 people in attendance.

== Players ==
Roster for their 2025-26 season

- Ray Bourque (team captain)
- Joey Mullen
- Tom Songin
- Bob Sweeney
- Bruce Crowder
- Adam McQuaid
- Frank Simonetti
- Billy Bennett
- Ken Linseman
- Bruce Shoebottom
- Steve Leach
- Rejean Lemelin
- Ken Hodge, Jr.
- Al Pedersen
- Graeme Townshend
- Dave Shaw
- Bob Beers
- Jay Miller
- Dave Silk
- Terry Virtue
- Tim Sweeney
- Bobby Carpenter
- Andrew Alberts
- Mark Mowers
- Jean-Yves Roy
- Keith Aucion
- Shawn McEachern
- Andrew Raycroft
- Richie Brennan
- Al Iafrate
- Pat Leahy
- Dan LaCouture
- Chris Bourque
- David A. Jensen
- Bobby Allen
- Tim Schaller
- Peter Douris
- Cleon Daskalakis
- Chris Winnes
- Mike Mottau
- Andrew Ference
- Kevan Miller
- Patrice Bergeron
- Zdeno Chára
- Tuuka Rask
- Steve Heinze
- John Blue

Notable non-Bruins who have played for the team include:

- Mike Lalor, Brad Staubitz, Mark Kumpel, and Mike Sanford who is the son of former Bruins player and alumni president Ed Sanford.

=== Former players of note ===
- Rick Middleton (former captain) (2013-2022) he now’s coaches the games
- Terry O’Reilly (former captain) (2013-2022)
- Andy Brickley (2014-2025)
- Hal Gill (2016-2018)

== Former team presidents ==
- Ed Sanford
- Milt Schmidt
- Johnny Bucyk
- Bob Sweeney (2001-2007)
- Rick Middleton (2007-2022)
- Frank Simonetti (2023-2026)
- Ken Hodge Jr. (2026-present)
