= Matt Christensen =

American ice hockey player (born 1964)

- Born: June 6, 1964 (age 62) Hoyt Lakes, Minnesota, USA
- Height: 6 ft 0 in (183 cm)
- Weight: 175 lb (79 kg; 12 st 7 lb)
- Position: Center
- Shot: Left
- Played for: Minnesota Duluth
- NHL draft: 176th, 1982; St. Louis Blues
- Playing career: 1982–1986

Matthew Christensen is an American retired ice hockey center who was an All-American for Minnesota Duluth.

== Career ==
Christensen was a star player in high school, scoring more than two points per game as a senior. His production led him to be selected by the St. Louis Blues in the NHL Draft. The following fall, he began attending the University of Minnesota Duluth, arriving the same time as new head coach, Mike Sertich. Christensen was more of a role player in his freshman season but he helped the team set several new program records including wins (28) and was part of the Bulldog's first appearance in the NCAA Tournament.

Christensen played much better in his sophomore season, nearly tripling his scoring production, and helped lead UMD to its first WCHA championship in 1984. The Bulldogs second tournament appearance went much better than their first and the team ended up making the championship game. Christensen assisted on the team's third goal but the Bulldogs ended up losing the match in quadruple overtime. Despite the outcome, and the loss of Hobey Baker Award-winner Tom Kurvers, UMD came back even stronger in 1985. Christensen centered a line with NCAA Scoring Champion Bill Watson and jumped up into the top ten scorers in the nation. UMD won its second league title and won 30 games for the first time (the 1985 team still hold the program record with 36 wins as of 2021). The Bulldogs made the Frozen Four for the second consecutive year and faced off against top-ranked Rensselaer in the semifinal. The game ended up being a classic with both teams trading leads to end up tied at 5-all after 60 minutes. It took three overtime periods for the winner to be decided but, unfortunately, Christensen team ended up losing the match. UMD would end up 3rd after winning the consolation game 7–6 in overtime.

With Watson leaving school early, Christensen got a new right wing for his senior season. It ended up being future NHL Hall of Famer Brett Hull. While the team declined a bit, they were sill on track to make another NCAA Tournament, but tragedy struck on February 9. While playing a game outside a friend's house, Christensen bent down to pick up his stick and fell over. His friends initially thought he was playing a joke but, when they went to check on him, knew something was seriously wrong. One of the boy's fathers, Bob Smalley, yelled for someone to call 9-1-1, fearing that Christensen had suffered a stroke. He was hospitalized that day and was later confirmed to have suffered an ischemic attack. Christensen suffered a second stroke while in hospital with the second being far more serious. It affected his ability to walk, talk and think. His season and career were both ended as a result but he was able to recover after physical therapy. While the source of the strokes was never conclusively discovered, doctors ruled out hockey as a primary cause.

Christensen's team attempted to finish out the season in his honor, but the news took the fight out of the Bulldogs. UMD went 1–5–2 the rest of the season and were left out of the NCAA tournament. Christensen finished his college career just 3 points behind Dan Lempe for the program's all-time scoring lead. He was named an All-American for the year but the bitter end of his playing career led Christensen to stay away from the team and many of his teammates for decades. He eventually returned for the final home game at the Duluth Entertainment Convention Center in 2010, glad to be reunited with his old friends.

He was inducted into the Minnesota Duluth Athletic Hall of Fame in 2014.

== Statistics ==
=== Regular season and playoffs ===
			Regular Season					Playoffs
Season	Team	League	GP	G	A	Pts	PIM	GP	G	A	Pts	PIM
1979–80	Aurora–Hoyt Lakes	MN-HS	—	—	—	—	—	—	—	—	—	—
1980–81	Aurora–Hoyt Lakes	MN-HS	—	—	—	—	—	—	—	—	—	—
1981–82	Aurora–Hoyt Lakes	MN-HS	23	23	34	57	8	—	—	—	—	—
1982–83	Minnesota–Duluth	WCHA	45	6	16	22	10	—	—	—	—	—
1983–84	Minnesota–Duluth	WCHA	42	24	39	63	10	—	—	—	—	—
1984–85	Minnesota–Duluth	WCHA	48	30	47	77	32	—	—	—	—	—
1985–86	Minnesota–Duluth	WCHA	33	16	41	57	36	—	—	—	—	—
NCAA totals			168	76	143	219	94	—	—	—	—	—

== Awards and honors ==
Award	Year
All-WCHA Second Team	1983–84
All-WCHA Second Team	1984–85
AHCA West Second-Team All-American	1985–86
