= Ken Hodge Jr. =

Canadian-born American ice hockey player (born 1966)

- Born: April 13, 1966 (age 60) Windsor, Ontario, Canada
- Height: 6 ft 1 in (185 cm)
- Weight: 200 lb (91 kg; 14 st 4 lb)
- Position: Center
- Shot: Left
- Played for: Minnesota North Stars; Boston Bruins; Tampa Bay Lightning
- NHL draft: 46th overall, 1984; Minnesota North Stars
- Playing career: 1988–1998

Kenneth David Hodge Jr. (born April 13, 1966) is a Canadian born-American former professional ice hockey player for the Minnesota North Stars, Boston Bruins, and Tampa Bay Lightning. Born in Canada and raised in the United States, he is the son of former Bruins star Ken Hodge.

== Playing career ==
Hodge began playing for his high-school team as a 16-year-old forward for the St. John's Prep and playing two years, appearing in 44 games and recording 47-71-118 numbers. After graduating he entered the NHL draft.

Hodge was selected by Minnesota in the third round (46th overall) of the 1984 NHL entry draft. He then played three seasons with Boston College, being named Hockey East Rookie of the Year during his freshman year in 1984-85. He scored 20 goals and 64 points in 44 games, after only appearing in 21 games in his sophomore year. He then had 62 points in 37 games during the 1986-87 season, helping Boston College claim the Hockey East regular season and tournament titles.

He began his professional career in 1987–88 with the Kalamazoo Wings in the International Hockey League. He played three seasons with Kalamazoo, having a 71-point season in 1988-89 and a 86-point season the following year in 1989–90. His NHL debut with five games with the North Stars in 1988–89. He was traded to the Boston Bruins on August 21, 1990, in exchange for the draft pick later used to select Dallas Stars defensive forward and multiple Selke Trophy winner Jere Lehtinen.

Hodge's best season was with the Bruins in 1990–91, when he scored 30 goals and added 29 assists, and was named to the NHL All-Rookie Team. On September 4, 1992, the Bruins traded him to the Tampa Bay Lightning with Matt Hervey for Darin Kimble and future considerations. Hodge's last NHL season was 1992–93 with Tampa Bay, when he had two goals and seven assists in 25 games. He played several more seasons in the minors, then two seasons in Europe, putting up decent numbers but ultimately retired after the 1997–98 season.

== Retirement ==
Since retirement hodge has served as a coach and senior advisor for the Boston hockey academy. In 2024-25 he served as the associate head coach for the 15U AAA team that won the EP Cup Series 15O Championship.

Since 2023 he has served as vice president of the Bruins alumni organization and plays charity games help raise money for multiple charitable causes. In 2026 he was named the organizations president.

== Personal life ==
Ken Hodge Jr. was born on April 13, 1966, in Windsor, Ontario, Canada. He is the eldest son of Ken Hodge Sr, who played 13 seasons in the NHL, and his wife Marry. He has two younger brothers, Brendon and Dan Hodge, both of whom also played collegiate hockey. Dan was drafted to the Bruins the same year as Hodge, and played ten years in the minor leagues, mostly with the Peoria Rivermen of the ECHL.

== Career statistics ==
			Regular season					Playoffs
Season	Team	League	GP	G	A	Pts	PIM	GP	G	A	Pts	PIM
1982–83	St. John's Prep	HS-MA	22	22	33	55	—	—	—	—	—	—
1983–84	St. John's Prep	HS-MA	22	25	38	63	—	—	—	—	—	—
1984–85	Boston College	HE	41	20	44	64	28	—	—	—	—	—
1985–86	Boston College	HE	21	11	17	28	16	—	—	—	—	—
1986–87	Boston College	HE	37	29	33	62	30	—	—	—	—	—
1987–88	Kalamazoo Wings	IHL	70	15	35	50	24	—	—	—	—	—
1988–89	Kalamazoo Wings	IHL	72	26	45	71	34	6	1	5	6	16
1988–89	Minnesota North Stars	NHL	5	1	1	2	0	—	—	—	—	—
1989–90	Kalamazoo Wings	IHL	68	33	53	86	19	10	5	13	18	2
1990–91	Maine Mariners	AHL	8	7	10	17	2	—	—	—	—	—
1990–91	Boston Bruins	NHL	70	30	29	59	20	15	4	6	10	6
1991–92	Maine Mariners	AHL	19	6	11	17	4	—	—	—	—	—
1991–92	Boston Bruins	NHL	42	6	11	17	10	—	—	—	—	—
1992–93	Atlanta Knights	IHL	16	10	17	27	0	—	—	—	—	—
1992–93	Tampa Bay Lightning	NHL	25	2	7	9	2	—	—	—	—	—
1992–93	San Diego Gulls	IHL	30	11	24	35	16	14	4	6	10	6
1993–94	Binghamton Rangers	AHL	79	22	56	78	51	—	—	—	—	—
1994–95	Kansas City Blades	IHL	62	15	25	40	18	17	4	6	10	4
1995–96	Minnesota Moose	IHL	75	14	40	54	28	—	—	—	—	—
1996–97	EC Ratingen	DEL	6	1	3	4	0	—	—	—	—	—
1996–97	Cardiff Devils	BISL	34	16	29	45	6	7	1	4	5	2
1997–98	Cardiff Devils	BISL	32	10	19	29	18	9	4	10	14	0
IHL totals			393	124	239	363	139	47	14	30	44	28
NHL totals			142	39	48	87	32	15	4	6	10	6
AHL totals			106	35	77	112	57	—	—	—	—	—

== Awards and honors ==
Award	Year
All-Hockey East Rookie Team	1984–85
Hockey East Rookie of the Year	1984-85
Hockey East All-Tournament Team	1986
NHL All-Rookie Team	1990-91
Seventh Player Award	1990-91
St. John's Prep Athletic Hall of Fame	1991
Boston College Varsity Club Hall of Fame	2013

Awards and achievements
Preceded by Award Created	Hockey East Rookie of the Year; 1984–85	Succeeded by Al Loring; Scott Young
