= Norm Foster (ice hockey) =

Canadian ice hockey player (born 1965)

- Born: February 10, 1965 (age 61) Vancouver, British Columbia, Canada
- Height: 5 ft 9 in (175 cm)
- Weight: 175 lb (79 kg; 12 st 7 lb)
- Position: Goaltender
- Caught: Left
- Played for: Boston Bruins; Edmonton Oilers
- NHL draft: 222nd overall, 1983; Boston Bruins
- Playing career: 1987–1995

Norman Richard "Norm" Foster (born February 10, 1965) is a Canadian former professional ice hockey goaltender who played 13 games in the National Hockey League (NHL) for the Boston Bruins and Edmonton Oilers between 1990 and 1992.

As a youth, he played in the 1978 Quebec International Pee-Wee Hockey Tournament with a minor ice hockey team from the Fraser Valley.

He currently resides in Rochester, Michigan.

== Career statistics ==
=== Regular season and playoffs ===
			Regular season									Playoffs
Season	Team	League	GP	W	L	T	MIN	GA	SO	GAA	SV%	GP	W	L	MIN	GA	SO	GAA	SV%
1981–82	Penticton Knights	BCJHL	21	—	—	—	1187	58	0	2.93	—	—	—	—	—	—	—	—	—
1982–83	Penticton Knights	BCJHL	33	—	—	—	1999	156	0	4.68	—	—	—	—	—	—	—	—	—
1983–84	Michigan State University	CCHA	32	23	8	0	1815	83	1	2.74	.898	—	—	—	—	—	—	—	—
1984–85	Michigan State University	CCHA	26	22	4	0	1531	67	0	2.63	.883	—	—	—	—	—	—	—	—
1985–86	Michigan State University	CCHA	24	17	5	1	1414	87	0	3.69	.877	—	—	—	—	—	—	—	—
1986–87	Michigan State University	CCHA	24	14	7	1	1383	90	1	3.90	.858	—	—	—	—	—	—	—	—
1987–88	Milwaukee Admirals	IHL	38	10	22	1	2001	170	0	5.10	.848	—	—	—	—	—	—	—	—
1988–89	Maine Mariners	AHL	47	16	17	6	2411	156	1	3.88	.861	—	—	—	—	—	—	—	—
1989–90	Maine Mariners	AHL	64	23	28	10	3664	217	3	3.55	.881	—	—	—	—	—	—	—	—
1990–91	Boston Bruins	NHL	3	2	1	0	184	14	0	4.57	.829	—	—	—	—	—	—	—	—
1990–91	Maine Mariners	AHL	2	1	1	0	122	7	0	3.44	.894	—	—	—	—	—	—	—	—
1990–91	Cape Breton Oilers	AHL	40	15	14	7	2207	135	1	3.67	.871	2	0	2	128	8	0	3.75	—
1991–92	Edmonton Oilers	NHL	10	5	3	0	439	20	0	2.73	.891	—	—	—	—	—	—	—	—
1991–92	Cape Breton Oilers	AHL	29	15	13	1	1699	119	0	4.20	.873	3	1	2	193	14	0	4.35	.885
1992–93	Cape Breton Oilers	AHL	10	5	5	0	560	53	0	5.68	.817	—	—	—	—	—	—	—	—
1992–93	Kansas City Blades	IHL	8	6	1	1	489	28	0	3.44	.893	1	0	0	16	0	0	0.00	1.000
1993–94	Hershey Bears	AHL	17	5	9	1	775	58	0	4.49	.865	—	—	—	—	—	—	—	—
1994–95	Detroit Vipers	IHL	18	9	5	1	797	59	0	4.44	.846	—	—	—	—	—	—	—	—
1994–95	Las Vegas Thunder	IHL	14	8	3	1	677	35	0	3.10	.889	—	—	—	—	—	—	—	—
1994–95	Detroit Falcons	CoHL	3	2	1	0	179	7	1	2.35	.889	—	—	—	—	—	—	—	—
NHL totals			13	7	4	0	624	34	0	3.27	.872	—	—	—	—	—	—	—	—

=== International ===
Year	Team	Event	GP	W	L	T	MIN	GA	SO	GAA	SV%
1985	Canada	WJC	2	2	0	0	120	1	1	0.50	—
Junior totals			2	2	0	0	120	1	1	0.50	—

== Awards and honours ==
Award	Year
All-CCHA Second Team	1983-84
CCHA All-Tournament Team	1984, 1985
All-NCAA All-Tournament Team	1986

Awards and achievements
Preceded by Glenn Healy	CCHA Most Valuable Player in Tournament; 1985	Succeeded by Bill Horn
