= Dan McFall =

American ice hockey player

- Born: July 8, 1963 (age 62) Kenmore, New York, United States
- Height: 6 ft 0 in (183 cm)
- Weight: 194 lb (88 kg; 13 st 12 lb)
- Position: Defence
- Played for: Winnipeg Jets
- NHL draft: 148th overall, 1981; Winnipeg Jets
- Playing career: 1985–1987

Daniel B. McFall (born April 8, 1963 in Kenmore, New York and raised in Buffalo, New York) is an American retired professional ice hockey player who played nine games in the National Hockey League between 1985 and 1986 with the Winnipeg Jets. He now runs a hockey company in Burlington, Vermont that organizes various leagues, clinics, and tournaments.

== Career statistics ==
=== Regular season and playoffs ===
			Regular season					Playoffs
Season	Team	League	GP	G	A	Pts	PIM	GP	G	A	Pts	PIM
1979–80	Buffalo Jr. Sabres	GLJHL	36	25	48	83	—	16	19	20	39	—
1980–81	Buffalo Jr. Sabres	GLJHL	—	—	—	—	—	—	—	—	—	—
1981–82	Michigan State University	CCHA	42	3	17	20	28	—	—	—	—	—
1982–83	Michigan State University	CCHA	36	12	14	26	22	—	—	—	—	—
1983–84	Michigan State University	CCHA	46	14	20	34	56	—	—	—	—	—
1984–85	Michigan State University	CCHA	44	7	25	32	32	—	—	—	—	—
1984–85	Winnipeg Jets	NHL	2	0	0	0	0	—	—	—	—	—
1985–86	Sherbrooke Canadiens	AHL	50	2	10	12	16	—	—	—	—	—
1985–86	Winnipeg Jets	NHL	7	0	1	1	0	—	—	—	—	—
1986–87	Fort Wayne Komets	IHL	11	0	5	5	0	—	—	—	—	—
NHL totals			9	0	1	1	0	—	—	—	—	—

=== International ===
Year	Team	Event	GP	G	A	Pts	PIM
1982	United States	WJC	7	2	0	2	4
1983	United States	WJC	7	0	0	0	6
Junior totals			14	2	0	2	10

== Awards and honors ==
Award	Year
All-CCHA First Team	1983–84
AHCA West Second-Team All-American	1983–84
All-CCHA Second Team	1984–85
AHCA West First-Team All-American	1984–85
CCHA All-Tournament Team	1985
