= Bill Watson (ice hockey) =

Canadian former ice hockey player (born 1964)

- Born: March 30, 1964 (age 62) Pine Falls, Manitoba, Canada
- Height: 6 ft 0 in (183 cm)
- Weight: 185 lb (84 kg; 13 st 3 lb)
- Position: Right wing
- Shot: Right
- Played for: Chicago Blackhawks
- NHL draft: 70th overall, 1982; Chicago Black Hawks
- Playing career: 1985–1989

William Charles Watson (born March 30, 1964) is a Canadian former ice hockey player. Watson won the Hobey Baker Award in 1985 while playing for the University of Minnesota Duluth. He would go to play professionally in the National Hockey League for the Chicago Blackhawks.

== Awards and honours ==
Award	Year
All-WCHA First Team	1983–84
AHCA West First-Team All-American	1983–84
All-WCHA First Team	1984–85
AHCA West First-Team All-American	1984–85
All-NCAA All-Tournament Team	1985

== Career statistics ==
			Regular season					Playoffs
Season	Team	League	GP	G	A	Pts	PIM	GP	G	A	Pts	PIM
1980–81	Prince Albert Raiders	SJHL	54	30	39	69	27	—	—	—	—	—
1981–82	Prince Albert Raiders	SJHL	47	43	41	84	37	—	—	—	—	—
1982–83	University of Minnesota Duluth	WCHA	22	5	10	15	10	—	—	—	—	—
1983–84	University of Minnesota Duluth	WCHA	40	35	51	86	12	—	—	—	—	—
1984–85	University of Minnesota Duluth	WCHA	46	49	60	109	46	—	—	—	—	—
1985–86	Chicago Black Hawks	NHL	52	8	16	24	2	2	0	1	1	0
1986–87	Chicago Blackhawks	NHL	51	13	19	32	6	4	0	1	1	0
1987–88	Chicago Blackhawks	NHL	9	2	0	2	0	—	—	—	—	—
1987–88	Saginaw Hawks	IHL	35	15	20	35	10	—	—	—	—	—
1988–89	Chicago Blackhawks	NHL	3	0	1	1	4	—	—	—	—	—
1988–89	Saginaw Hawks	IHL	42	26	24	50	18	3	1	0	1	2
NHL totals			115	23	36	59	12	6	0	2	2	0

Awards and achievements
Preceded by Tom Kurvers	WCHA Most Valuable Player; 1984–85	Succeeded by Dallas Gaume
Preceded by Paul Pooley	NCAA Ice Hockey Scoring Champion; 1984–85	Succeeded by Dan Dorion
Preceded by Tom Kurvers	Winner of the Hobey Baker Award; 1984–85	Succeeded by Scott Fusco
Sporting positions
Preceded by Phil Latreille, Dave Taylor	NCAA Single-Season Points Leader; 1985–1987	Succeeded by Tony Hrkac
