= 1985 CCHA men's ice hockey tournament =

1985 CCHA Men's ice hockey tournament
- Dates: March 8–16, 1985
- Teams: 8
- Finals site: Joe Louis Arena; Detroit, Michigan
- Champions: Michigan State (4th title)
- Winning coach: Ron Mason (7th title)
- MVP: Norm Foster (Michigan State)
- CCHA Men's Ice Hockey Tournaments

The 1985 CCHA Men's Ice Hockey Tournament was the 14th CCHA Men's Ice Hockey Tournament. It was played between March 8 and March 16, 1985. First round games were played at campus sites, while 'final four' games were played at Joe Louis Arena in Detroit, Michigan. By winning the tournament, Michigan State received the Central Collegiate Hockey Association's automatic bid to the 1985 NCAA Division I Men's Ice Hockey Tournament.

== Format ==
The tournament featured three rounds of play. The team that finished below eighth place in the standings was not eligible for postseason play. In the quarterfinals, the first and eighth seeds, the second and seventh seeds, the third seed and sixth seeds and the fourth seed and fifth seeds played a two-game series where the team that scored the higher number of goals after the games was declared the victor and advanced to the semifinals. In the semifinals, the remaining highest and lowest seeds and second highest and second lowest seeds play a single-game, with the winners advancing to the finals. The tournament champion receives an automatic bid to the 1985 NCAA Division I Men's Ice Hockey Tournament.

== Conference standings ==
Note: GP = Games played; W = Wins; L = Losses; T = Ties; PTS = Points; GF = Goals For; GA = Goals Against

1984–85 Central Collegiate Hockey Association standings
	Conference							Overall					
	GP	W	L	T	PTS	GF	GA	GP	W	L	T	GF	GA
Michigan State†*	32	27	5	0	54	191	78	44	38	6	0	262	100
Lake Superior State	32	21	11	0	42	147	120	44	27	16	1	190	160
Western Michigan	32	18	13	1	37	133	103	40	22	16	2	164	138
Bowling Green	32	17	15	0	34	154	146	42	21	21	0	201	196
Illinois-Chicago	32	15	17	0	30	154	169	40	17	23	0	193	219
Ohio State	32	13	17	2	28	121	146	41	19	20	2	162	181
Michigan	32	11	20	1	23	118	163	40	13	26	1	151	208
Miami	32	10	19	3	23	127	174	40	14	23	3	158	205
Ferris State	32	8	23	1	17	110	156	38	11	26	1	140	176
Championship: Michigan State † indicates conference regular season champion * indicates conference tournament champion

== Bracket ==
Quarterfinals; March 8–10
1	Michigan State	4	7	–
8	Miami	3	1	–
2	Lake Superior State	3	7	–
7	Michigan	1	6	–
(Pairings are reseeded after the first round)
3	Western Michigan	2	5	–
6	Ohio State	4	4*	–
4	Bowling Green	7	7	–
5	Illinois–Chicago	5	2	–

Semifinals; March 14
1	Michigan State	8
6	Ohio State	0
2	Lake Superior State	4
4	Bowling Green	1

Championship; March 16
1	Michigan State	5
2	Lake Superior State	1
Consolation Game
4	Bowling Green	3
6	Ohio State	7

Note: * denotes overtime period(s)

=== First round ===
==== (1) Michigan State vs. (8) Miami ====
Michigan State	4 – 3	Miami	Munn Ice Arena

Michigan State	7 – 1	Miami	Munn Ice Arena

Michigan State won series 11–4

==== (2) Lake Superior State vs. (7) Michigan ====
Lake Superior State	3 – 1	Michigan	Taffy Abel Arena

Lake Superior State	7 – 6	Michigan	Taffy Abel Arena

Lake Superior State won series 10–7

==== (3) Western Michigan vs. (6) Ohio State ====
Western Michigan	2 – 4	Ohio State	Lawson Arena

Western Michigan	5 – 4	OT	Ohio State	Lawson Arena

Ohio State won series 8–7

==== (4) Bowling Green vs. (5) Illinois–Chicago ====
Bowling Green	7 – 5	Illinois–Chicago	BGSU Ice Arena

Bowling Green	7 – 2	Illinois–Chicago	BGSU Ice Arena

Bowling Green won series 14–7

=== Semifinals ===
==== (1) Michigan State vs. (6) Ohio State ====
March 14	Michigan State	8 – 0	0	Ohio State	Joe Louis Arena

==== (2) Lake Superior State vs. (4) Bowling Green ====
March 14	Lake Superior State	4 – 1	Bowling Green	Joe Louis Arena

=== Consolation Game ===
==== (4) Bowling Green vs. (6) Ohio State ====
March 16	Bowling Green	4 – 7	Ohio State	Joe Louis Arena

=== Championship ===
==== (1) Michigan State vs. (2) Lake Superior State ====
March 16	Michigan State	5 – 1	Lake Superior State	Joe Louis Arena

== Tournament awards ==
=== All-Tournament Team ===
- F Craig Simpson (Michigan State)
- F Kelly Miller (Michigan State)
- F Tom Anastos (Michigan State)
- D Donald McSween (Michigan State)
- D Dan McFall (Michigan State)
- G Norm Foster* (Michigan State)

* Most Valuable Player(s)
