= 1984–85 NCAA Division I men's ice hockey season =

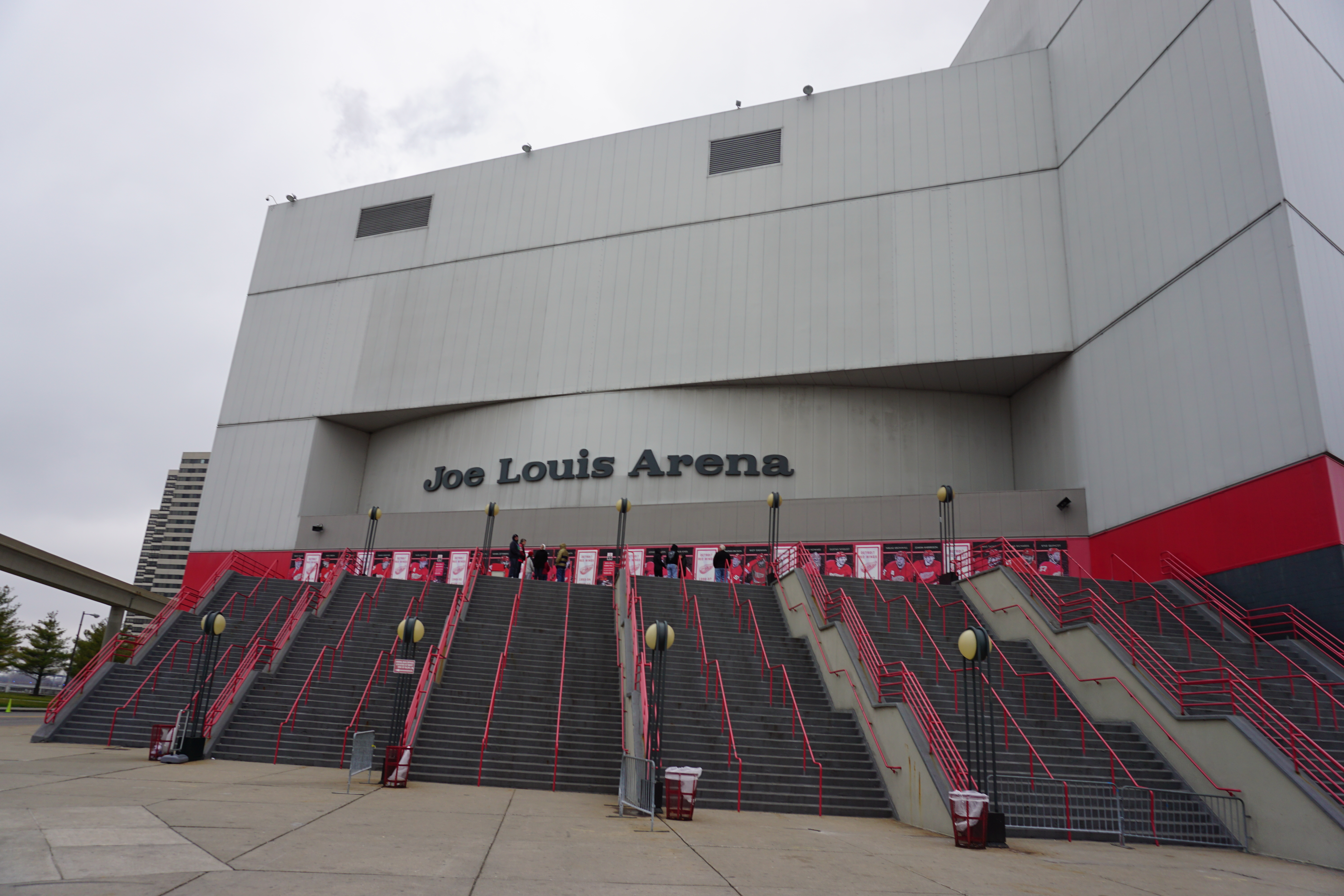
- The Joe Louis Arena served as the host for the 1985 Frozen Four
- Duration: October 1984– March 30, 1985
- NCAA tournament: 1985
- National championship: Joe Louis Arena; Detroit, Michigan
- NCAA champion: Rensselaer
- Hobey Baker Award: Bill Watson (Minnesota–Duluth)

The 1984–85 NCAA Division I men's ice hockey season began in October 1984 and concluded with the 1985 NCAA Division I Men's Ice Hockey Tournament's championship game on March 30, 1985 at the Joe Louis Arena in Detroit, Michigan. This was the 38th season in which an NCAA ice hockey championship was held and is the 91st year overall where an NCAA school fielded a team.

Seven teams from ECAC Hockey left after the previous year to form a new conference, Hockey East.

Hockey East and the WCHA formed an agreement where games played between their respective conferences would count towards the standings in each conference. This arrangement would continue for five year, ending after the 1988–89 season.

== Season Outlook ==
=== Pre-season polls ===
The top teams in the nation.

The WMPL poll was voted on by coaches before the start of the season. The College Hockey Statistics Bureau (CHSB) / WDOM poll was voted on by media after the season started.

WMPL Poll
Rank	Team
1	Boston University (4)
2	Michigan Tech
3	Michigan State (2)
4	Minnesota (4)
5	Colorado College
6	Boston College
7	Michigan
8	Western Michigan
9 (tie)	Minnesota Duluth
9 (tie)	Rensselaer

CHSB / WDOM Poll
Rank	Team
1	Minnesota (7)
2	Michigan State (1)
3	Boston University (2)
4	Boston College
5	Rensselaer
6	Clarkson
7	Minnesota Duluth
8	Illinois Chicago
9	Michigan Tech
10	Providence

== Regular season ==
=== Season tournaments ===
Tournament	Dates	Teams	Champion
Empire Cup	November 23–24	4	St. Lawrence
First Interstate Classic	December 27–30	6	Yale
KeyBank Tournament	December 28–29	4	Ohio State
Great Lakes Invitational	December 28–29	4	Michigan State
Rensselaer Holiday Tournament	December 28–29	4	Rensselaer
Syracuse Invitational	December 29–30	4	Colgate
Auld Lang Syne Classic	December 30–31	4	New Hampshire
CBC Micron Tournament	January 3–4	4	
Down East Classic	January 4–5	4	Brown
Phoenix Mutual Classic	January 4–5	4	Northern Michigan
Beanpot	February 4, 11	4	Northeastern

=== Standings ===
1984–85 Central Collegiate Hockey Association standings
	Conference							Overall					
	GP	W	L	T	PTS	GF	GA	GP	W	L	T	GF	GA
Michigan State†*	32	27	5	0	54	191	78	44	38	6	0	262	100
Lake Superior State	32	21	11	0	42	147	120	44	27	16	1	190	160
Western Michigan	32	18	13	1	37	133	103	40	22	16	2	164	138
Bowling Green	32	17	15	0	34	154	146	42	21	21	0	201	196
Illinois-Chicago	32	15	17	0	30	154	169	40	17	23	0	193	219
Ohio State	32	13	17	2	28	121	146	41	19	20	2	162	181
Michigan	32	11	20	1	23	118	163	40	13	26	1	151	208
Miami	32	10	19	3	23	127	174	40	14	23	3	158	205
Ferris State	32	8	23	1	17	110	156	38	11	26	1	140	176
Championship: Michigan State † indicates conference regular season champion * indicates conference tournament champion

1984–85 ECAC Hockey standings
	Conference							Overall					
	GP	W	L	T	PTS	GF	GA	GP	W	L	T	GF	GA
Rensselaer†*	21	20	1	0	40	139	54	38	35	2	1	245	100
Harvard	21	15	5	1	31	99	58	32	21	9	2	147	96
Clarkson	21	15	6	0	30	87	59	34	21	10	3	143	104
Cornell	21	14	6	1	29	101	78	30	18	10	2	145	115
Yale	21	13	7	1	27	93	78	31	19	11	1	148	122
St. Lawrence	21	12	9	0	24	75	70	32	17	13	2	122	122
Colgate	21	9	12	0	18	75	77	32	14	18	0	122	122
Princeton	21	7	12	2	16	58	74	28	12	14	2	96	105
Brown	21	6	15	0	12	59	81	26	9	17	0	76	102
Vermont	21	4	17	0	8	46	97	29	8	21	0	75	128
Dartmouth	21	3	17	1	7	49	122	24	5	18	1	63	139
Army^	11	0	11	0	0	29	60	30	17	13	0	150	121
Championship: Rensselaer † indicates conference regular season champion * indicates conference tournament champion^ Army played a half schedule

1984–85 Hockey East standings
	Conference							Overall					
	GP	W	L	T	PTS	GF	GA	GP	W	L	T	GF	GA
Boston College†	34	24	9	1	49	182	125	45	28	15	2	240	172
Boston University	34	19	11	4	42	139	132	42	24	14	4	170	165
Providence*	34	15	14	5	35	119	127	45	23	17	5	156	149
New Hampshire	34	12	21	1	25	139	152	43	16	26	1	198	191
Lowell	34	11	21	2	24	125	169	42	15	25	2	169	215
Northeastern	34	11	22	1	23	120	155	38	13	24	1	130	167
Maine	34	8	26	0	16	105	185	42	12	29	1	140	211
Championship: Providence † indicates conference regular season champion * indicates conference tournament champion

1984–85 NCAA Division I Independent ice hockey standings
	Conference							Overall					
	GP	W	L	T	PTS	GF	GA	GP	W	L	T	GF	GA
Air Force	0	0	0	0	-	-	-	29	14	14	1	136	145
Alaska–Anchorage	0	0	0	0	-	-	-	38	17	21	0	202	190
Alaska–Fairbanks	0	0	0	0	-	-	-	34	21	12	1	201	170
Kent State	0	0	0	0	-	-	-	27	11	14	2		
Northern Arizona	0	0	0	0	-	-	-	30	12	18	0	121	173
Notre Dame	0	0	0	0	-	-	-	28	11	16	1	162	170
US International	0	0	0	0	-	-	-	32	7	23	2		

1984–85 Western Collegiate Hockey Association standings
	Conference							Overall					
	GP	W	L	T	PTS	GF	GA	GP	W	L	T	GF	GA
Minnesota-Duluth†*	34	25	7	2	52	178	110	48	36	9	3	257	159
Minnesota	34	21	10	3	45	165	113	47	31	13	3	233	163
Wisconsin	34	20	14	0	40	169	152	42	25	17	0	208	183
North Dakota	34	19	14	1	39	155	114	42	24	16	2	202	148
Denver	34	16	15	3	35	152	155	39	19	17	3	178	177
Colorado College	34	15	19	0	30	141	167	38	17	21	0	164	183
Northern Michigan	34	14	20	0	28	148	160	40	19	21	0	179	180
Michigan Tech	34	13	20	1	27	132	148	40	15	24	1	147	178
Championship: Minnesota-Duluth † indicates conference regular season champion * indicates conference tournament champion

=== Final regular season poll ===
The final top 10 teams as ranked by coaches (WMPL) before the conference tournament finals.

WMPL Coaches Poll
Ranking	Team
1	Rensselaer (6)
2	Minnesota Duluth (2)
3	Michigan State (2)
4	Boston College
5	Minnesota
6	Wisconsin
7	North Dakota
(tie)	Lake Superior State
9	Harvard
10	Boston University

== 1985 NCAA Tournament ==
Quarterfinals; March 22–24
E1	Rensselaer	7	3	10
W4	Lake Superior State	3	3	6
W2	Minnesota–Duluth	4	4	8
E3	Harvard	2	2	4
W1	Michigan State	3	2	5
E4	Providence	2	4	6
E2	Boston College	5	4	9
W3	Minnesota	7	1	8

Semifinals; March 28–29
E1	Rensselaer	6***
W2	Minnesota–Duluth	5
E4	Providence	4***
E2	Boston College	3

National championship March 30
E1	Rensselaer	2
E4	Providence	1
Third-place game
W2	Minnesota–Duluth	7*
E2	Boston College	6

Note: * denotes overtime period(s)

== Player stats ==
=== Scoring leaders ===
The following players led the league in points at the conclusion of the season.

GP = Games played; G = Goals; A = Assists; Pts = Points; PIM = Penalty minutes

Player	Class	Team	GP	G	A	Pts	PIM
Bill Watson	Junior	Minnesota−Duluth	46	49	60	109	48
Pat Micheletti	Junior	Minnesota	44	48	48	96	154
Adam Oates	Junior	Rensselaer	38	31	60	91	29
Craig Simpson	Sophomore	Michigan State	42	31	53	84	33
Scott Fusco	Junior	Harvard	32	34	47	81	24
Matt Christensen	Junior	Minnesota−Duluth	48	30	47	77	32
Rick Erdall	Senior	Minnesota	44	25	51	76	44
Tim Army	Senior	Providence	45	27	46	73	16
John Carter	Junior	Rensselaer	37	43	29	72	52
Ray Staszak	Sophomore	Illinois–Chicago	38	37	35	72	98
Scott Harlow	Junior	Boston College	44	34	38	72	45

=== Leading goaltenders ===
The following goaltenders led the league in goals against average at the end of the regular season while playing at least 33% of their team's total minutes.

GP = Games played; Min = Minutes played; W = Wins; L = Losses; OT = Overtime/shootout losses; GA = Goals against; SO = Shutouts; SV% = Save percentage; GAA = Goals against average

Player	Class	Team	GP	Min	W	L	OT	GA	SO	SV%	GAA
Bob Essensa	Sophomore	Michigan State	18	1059	15	2	0	29	2	.921	1.64
Daren Puppa	Sophomore	Rensselaer	32	1830	30	1	1	78	2	.901	2.56
Norm Foster	Sophomore	Michigan State	26	1531	22	4	0	67	0	.883	2.63
Grant Blair	Junior	Harvard	31	1785	19	9	2	86	1	.901	2.89
Jamie Falle	Junior	Clarkson	29	1668	18	9	1	81	0	.895	2.91
Terry Taillefer	Sophomore	Boston University	15	-	-	-	-	-	-	.902	3.01
Rick Kosti	Sophomore	Minnesota−Duluth	45	2736	33	9	3	146	0	.890	3.20
Glenn Healy	Senior	Western Michigan	37	2171	21	14	2	118	0	.906	3.26
Scott Brower	Junior	North Dakota	31	-	15	12	2	-	2	.889	3.28
Chris Terreri	Junior	Providence	41	2515	21	15	5	131	0	.915	3.35

== Awards ==
=== NCAA ===
Award		Recipient
Hobey Baker Memorial Award		Bill Watson, Minnesota–Duluth
Spencer Penrose Award		Len Ceglarski, Boston College
Most Outstanding Player in NCAA Tournament		Chris Terreri, Providence
AHCA All-American Teams
East First Team	Position	West First Team
Chris Terreri, Providence	G	Rick Kosti, Minnesota–Duluth
Dave Fretz, Clarkson	D	Norm Maciver, Minnesota–Duluth
Ken Hammond, Rensselaer	D	Dan McFall, Michigan State
Tim Army, Providence	F	Pat Micheletti, Minnesota
Scott Fusco, Harvard	F	Kelly Miller, Michigan State
Adam Oates, Rensselaer	F	Craig Simpson, Michigan State
	F	Bill Watson, Minnesota–Duluth
East Second Team	Position	West Second Team
Jeff Cooper, Colgate	G	Glenn Healy, Western Michigan
Jim Averill, Northeastern	D	Gary Haight, Michigan State
Peter Taglianetti, Providence	D	Tim Thomas, Wisconsin
Doug Brown, Boston College	F	Tony Granato, Wisconsin
John Carter, Rensselaer	F	Steve Moria, Alaska-Fairbanks
Bob Sweeney, Boston College	F	Ray Staszak, Illinois-Chicago

=== CCHA ===
Awards		Recipient
Player of the Year		Ray Staszak, Illinois-Chicago
Rookie of the Year		Paul Ysebaert, Bowling Green
Coach of the Year		Ron Mason, Michigan State
Most Valuable Player in Tournament		Norm Foster, Michigan State
All-CCHA Teams
First Team	Position	Second Team
Bob Essensa, Michigan State	G	Glenn Healy, Western Michigan
Gary Haight, Michigan State	D	Dan McFall, Michigan State
Don McSween, Michigan State	D	Mike Rousseau, Ohio State
Craig Simpson, Michigan State	F	Jamie Wansbrough, Bowling Green
Ray Staszak, Illinois-Chicago	F	Allan Butler, Lake Superior State
Kelly Miller, Michigan State	F	Tom Anastos, Michigan State

=== ECAC ===
Award		Recipient
Player of the Year		Scott Fusco, Harvard
Rookie of the Year		Joe Nieuwendyk, Cornell
Most Outstanding Player in Tournament		Daren Puppa, Rensselaer
All-ECAC Hockey Teams
First Team	Position	Second Team
Jeff Cooper, Colgate	G	Grant Blair, Harvard
Dave Fretz, Clarkson	D	Peter Sawkins, Yale
Ken Hammond, Rensselaer	D	Steve Tuite, St. Lawrence
John Carter, Rensselaer	F	Duanne Moeser, Cornell
Scott Fusco, Harvard	F	Peter Natyshak, Cornell
Adam Oates, Rensselaer	F	Randy Wood, Yale

=== Hockey East ===
Award		Recipient
Player of the Year		Chris Terreri, Providence
Rookie of the Year		Ken Hodge, Boston College
Coach of the Year Award		Len Ceglarski, Boston College
William Flynn Tournament Most Valuable Player		Chris Terreri, Providence
All-Hockey East Teams
First Team	Position	Second Team
Chris Terreri, Providence	G	Bruce Racine, Northeastern
Jim Averill, Northeastern	D	Scott Shaunessy, Boston University
Peter Taglianetti, Providence	D	Paul Ames, Lowell
Tim Army, Providence	F	Doug Brown, Boston College
John Cullen, Boston University	F	Bob Sweeney, Boston College
Rod Isbister, Northeastern	F	Scott Harlow, Boston College
Rookie Team	Position	
Bruce Racine, Northeastern	G	
Shawn Whitham, Providence	D	
Paul Cavallini, Providence	D	
Ken Hodge, Boston College	F	
Jon Morris, Lowell	F	
Steve Leach, New Hampshire	F	
Clark Donatelli, Boston University	F	

=== WCHA ===
Award		Recipient
Most Valuable Player		Bill Watson, Minnesota-Duluth
Freshman of the Year		Brett Hull, Minnesota-Duluth
Coach of the Year		Mike Sertich, Minnesota-Duluth
All-WCHA Teams
First Team	Position	Second Team
Rick Kosti, Minnesota-Duluth	G	John Blue, Minnesota
Tim Thomas, Wisconsin	D	Rob Doyle, Colorado College
Norm Maciver, Minnesota-Duluth	D	Doug Clarkem Colorado College
Bill Watson, Minnesota-Duluth	F	Matt Christensen, Minnesota-Duluth
Pat Micheletti, Minnesota	F	Corey Millen, Minnesota
Jim Archibald, North Dakota	F	Tony Granato, Wisconsin

== 1985 NHL entry draft ==
Round	Pick	Player	College	Conference	NHL team
1	2	Craig Simpson	Michigan State	CCHA	Pittsburgh Penguins
1	16	Tom Chorske ^{†}	Minnesota	WCHA	Montreal Canadiens
1	17	Chris Biotti ^{†}	Harvard	ECAC Hockey	Calgary Flames
2	27	Joe Nieuwendyk	Cornell	ECAC Hockey	Calgary Flames
2	28	Mike Richter ^{†}	Wisconsin	WCHA	New York Rangers
2	32	Eric Weinrich ^{†}	Maine	Hockey East	New Jersey Devils
2	33	Todd Richards ^{†}	Minnesota	WCHA	Montreal Canadiens
2	42	Bruce Rendall ^{†}	Michigan State	CCHA	Philadelphia Flyers
3	44	Nelson Emerson ^{†}	Bowling Green	CCHA	St. Louis Blues
3	45	Myles OConnor ^{†}	Michigan	CCHA	New Jersey Devils
3	54	Ned Desmond ^{†}	Dartmouth	ECAC Hockey	St. Louis Blues
3	58	Bruce Racine	Northeastern	Hockey East	Pittsburgh Penguins
3	59	Lane MacDonald ^{†}	Harvard	ECAC Hockey	Calgary Flames
4	70	Pat Janostin ^{†}	Minnesota–Duluth	WCHA	New York Rangers
4	72	Perry Florio ^{†}	Providence	Hockey East	Los Angeles Kings
4	78	David Espe ^{†}	Minnesota	WCHA	Quebec Nordiques
4	84	Paul Marshall ^{†}	Boston College	Hockey East	Philadelphia Flyers
5	85	Jeff Serowik ^{†}	Providence	Hockey East	Toronto Maple Leafs
5	92	Chris Luongo ^{†}	Michigan State	CCHA	Detroit Red Wings
5	94	Steve Moore ^{†}	Rensselaer	ECAC Hockey	Boston Bruins
5	96	Tom Sagissor ^{†}	Wisconsin	WCHA	Calgary Flames
5	97	Jeff Sveen	Boston University	Hockey East	New York Islanders
5	99	Bruce Major ^{†}	Maine	Hockey East	Quebec Nordiques
5	100	Dan Brooks ^{†}	Denver	WCHA	St. Louis Blues
5	102	John Borrell ^{†}	Lowell	Hockey East	Winnipeg Jets
6	111	Mike Mullowney ^{†}	Boston College	Hockey East	Minnesota North Stars
6	112	Brian McReynolds ^{†}	Michigan State	CCHA	New York Rangers
6	113	Randy McKay	Michigan Tech	WCHA	Detroit Red Wings
6	120	Andy Akervik ^{†}	Wisconsin	WCHA	Quebec Nordiques
6	121	Rich Burchill ^{†}	New Hampshire	Hockey East	St. Louis Blues
6	122	Tim Sweeney ^{†}	Boston College	Hockey East	Calgary Flames
6	123	Danton Cole ^{†}	Michigan State	CCHA	Winnipeg Jets
7	129	Kevin Schrader ^{†}	New Hampshire	Hockey East	New Jersey Devils
7	132	Mike Kelfer ^{†}	Boston University	Hockey East	Minnesota North Stars
7	135	Tim Flanagan	Michigan Tech	WCHA	Los Angeles Kings
7	137	Vic Posa	Wisconsin	WCHA	Chicago Black Hawks
7	142	Ed Cristofoli ^{†}	Denver	WCHA	Montreal Canadiens
7	144	Brent Mowery ^{†}	Northern Arizona	Independent	Winnipeg Jets
8	148	Andy Donahue ^{†}	Dartmouth	ECAC Hockey	Toronto Maple Leafs
8	149	Paul Stanton ^{†}	Wisconsin	WCHA	Pittsburgh Penguins
8	150	Ed Krayer ^{†}	Harvard	ECAC Hockey	New Jersey Devils
8	153	Ross Johnson ^{†}	Minnesota–Duluth	WCHA	Minnesota North Stars
8	155	Mike Luckraft ^{†}	Minnesota	WCHA	Detroit Red Wings
8	156	John Hyduke ^{†}	Minnesota–Duluth	WCHA	Los Angeles Kings
8	159	Scott Brickey ^{†}	North Dakota	WCHA	St. Louis Blues
8	160	Hank Lammens	St. Lawrence	ECAC Hockey	New York Islanders
8	164	Nate Smith ^{†}	Princeton	ECAC Hockey	Calgary Flames
8	165	Tom Draper	Vermont	ECAC Hockey	Winnipeg Jets
8	168	Mike Cusack ^{†}	Michigan	CCHA	Philadelphia Flyers
9	169	Todd Whittemore ^{†}	Providence	Hockey East	Toronto Maple Leafs
9	173	Greg Dornbach	Miami	CCHA	Hartford Whalers
9	176	Rob Schena ^{†}	Rensselaer	ECAC Hockey	Detroit Red Wings
9	177	Steve Horner ^{†}	New Hampshire	Hockey East	Los Angeles Kings
9	178	Gord Cruickshank	Providence	Hockey East	Boston Bruins
9	179	Richard Laplante	Vermont	ECAC Hockey	Chicago Black Hawks
9	180	Jeff Urban ^{†}	Michigan	CCHA	St. Louis Blues
9	184	Roger Beedon ^{†}	Ohio State	CCHA	Montreal Canadiens
9	185	Darryl Olsen ^{†}	Northern Michigan	WCHA	Calgary Flames
9	186	Neven Kardum ^{†}	Providence	Hockey East	Winnipeg Jets
10	190	Bobby Reynolds ^{†}	Michigan State	CCHA	Toronto Maple Leafs
10	191	Steve Shaunessy ^{†}	Boston University	Hockey East	Pittsburgh Penguins
10	192	Terry Shold ^{†}	Minnesota–Duluth	WCHA	New Jersey Devils
10	193	Carl Valimont	Lowell	Hockey East	Vancouver Canucks
10	195	Gordie Ernst ^{†}	Brown	ECAC Hockey	Minnesota North Stars
10	198	Maurice Mansi ^{†}	Rensselaer	ECAC Hockey	Montreal Canadiens
10	199	Dave Buda ^{†}	Northeastern	Hockey East	Boston Bruins
10	201	Vince Guidotti ^{†}	Maine	Hockey East	St. Louis Blues
10	202	Brad Hamilton ^{†}	Michigan State	CCHA	Chicago Black Hawks
10	203	Boyd Sutton ^{†}	Miami	CCHA	Buffalo Sabres
10	205	Chad Arthur ^{†}	Bowling Green	CCHA	Montreal Canadiens
10	210	Bob Beers ^{†}	Northern Arizona	Independent	Boston Bruins
11	215	Jerry Pawloski	Harvard	ECAC Hockey	Hartford Whalers
11	220	John Byce ^{†}	Wisconsin	WCHA	Boston Bruins
11	222	Ron Saatzer ^{†}	Miami	CCHA	St. Louis Blues
11	225	Gary Murphy ^{†}	Lowell	Hockey East	Quebec Nordiques
11	226	Mike Bishop ^{†}	Colgate	ECAC Hockey	Montreal Canadiens
11	228	Chris Norton	Cornell	ECAC Hockey	Winnipeg Jets
11	230	Peter Headon ^{†}	Boston University	Hockey East	Edmonton Oilers
12	232	Mitch Murphy ^{†}	Colgate	ECAC Hockey	Toronto Maple Leafs
12	234	David Williams ^{†}	Dartmouth	ECAC Hockey	New Jersey Devils
12	236	Bruce Hill	Denver	WCHA	Hartford Whalers
12	242	Richard Braccia ^{†}	Boston College	Hockey East	Chicago Black Hawks
12	247	John Ferguson ^{†}	Providence	Hockey East	Montreal Canadiens
12	251	John Haley ^{†}	Rensselaer	ECAC Hockey	Edmonton Oilers

† incoming freshman

== See also ==
- 1984–85 NCAA Division III men's ice hockey season
