= Rick Middleton =

Canadian ice hockey player (born 1953)

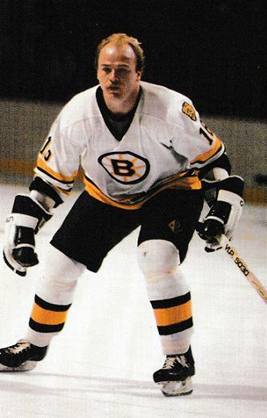
- Middleton with the Boston Bruins in 1984
- Born: December 4, 1953 (age 72) Toronto, Ontario, Canada
- Height: 5 ft 10 in (178 cm)
- Weight: 169 lb (77 kg; 12 st 1 lb)
- Position: Right wing
- Shot: Right
- Played for: New York Rangers; Boston Bruins
- National team: Canada
- NHL draft: 14th overall, 1973; New York Rangers
- WHA draft: 21st overall, 1973; Minnesota Fighting Saints
- Playing career: 1974–1988
Medal record
Representing Canada
Ice hockey
Canada Cup
Gold medal – first place	1984 Canada	(player)
Silver medal – second place	1981 Canada	(player)
Representing United States
Sledge hockey
Winter Paralympics
Gold medal – first place	2002 Utah	(coach)

Richard David "Nifty" Middleton (born December 4, 1953) is a Canadian former professional ice hockey player for the New York Rangers and Boston Bruins of the National Hockey League (NHL). Middleton played 14 years in the NHL, most prominently with the Bruins, serving as their captain alongside Ray Bourque from 1985 until his retirement in 1988.

Throughout his career, Middleton was known for his exceptional stickhandling and scoring ability, recording multiple 90-plus- and 100-plus-point seasons. He won the Lady Byng Memorial Trophy for sportsmanship in 1982. Internationally, Middleton represented Team Canada twice in the Canada Cup, winning a gold medal in 1984.

Following his retirement, Middleton served as the head coach of the United States 2002 Paralympic Sled Hockey team and coached them to their first gold medal at the 2002 Paralympic Olympics. He has since been inducted into both the U.S. Olympic & Paralympic Hall of Fame and the U.S. Hockey Hall of Fame.

He has also remained involved with the Bruins in commentary and ambassador roles.

== Early life ==
Middleton was born in Toronto, Canada on Dec 4, 1953 to his parents Terry & Dick Middleton. He began skating at 4 years old when his dad froze a small rink in the backyard and the older boys would take him on the ice so they could skate. He would start playing organized hockey when he was 6 years old along with playing street hockey with his neighbors. As a youth, Middleton played in the 1966 Quebec International Pee-Wee Hockey Tournament with a minor ice hockey team from Wexford, Toronto. Middleton’s family were very supportive of his hockey pursuits; his father who was a printer by trade would print flags that would say "Go Wexford Go" for the parents to wave at games. Middleton continued to play for the team until he turned 13. When he received an invitation tryout with a new organization in the Toronto Hockey League with the Toronto Young Nationals. Middleton would make the team, spending the next 3 years with the team while greatly improving his play.

== Playing career ==
=== Early career ===
A right winger, during his final year with the Toronto Young Nationals in 1970–71, Middleton appeared in 42 games, scoring 39 goals and 34 assists. Following his stint with the Nationals, Middleton played two seasons with the Oshawa Generals. During his first year with the club, Middleton appeared in 53 games and scored 70 points (36 goals and 34 assists). However, it was during his second year with the Generals in 1972–73 that he led the OHL in scoring, finishing with 67 goals and 70 assists for 137 total points in 62 games. He was named to the league’s Second All-Star Team and was awarded the Red Tilson Trophy as the league’s MVP.

=== New York Rangers ===
Middleton was drafted in the first round, 14th overall, by the Rangers in the 1973 NHL Amateur Draft. He spent the 1973–74 season with the Rangers' farm team, the AHL Providence Reds, earning the Dudley “Red” Garrett Memorial Award as the AHL’s Rookie of the Year with 36 goals and 48 assists in 63 games and was also named to the AHL's First All-Star Team. During the postseason, Middleton recorded 15 points in 15 games as he helped lead the Reds to the Calder Cup Finals, where they were defeated by the Hershey Bears 4–1.

Middleton made the big club during the 1974–75 season and went on to score his first two NHL goals during his debut in a 6–3 Rangers victory over the Washington Capitals. Later in the year, during a game vs. the California Golden Seals, Middleton scored a career-best four goals as the Rangers won 10–0. During his rookie year, Middleton suffered multiple injuries that restricted him to 47 games; during that time, he scored 22 goals and 18 assists for 40 points. That year, he played in all three postseason games as the Rangers were eliminated 2–1 by the New York Islanders. The following year, in 1975–76, Middleton appeared in 77 games for the Rangers and recorded 24 goals and 26 assists. The Rangers missed the playoffs that year.

=== Boston Bruins ===
Middleton was traded to the Boston Bruins for Ken Hodge on May 26, 1976. Rangers head coach and general manager John Ferguson Sr. was confident that his team had enough young talent to justify making Middleton expendable. What the Bruins got was a player who was ten years younger and a swifter skater than Hodge. The transaction became even more one-sided in favor of the Bruins when head coach Don Cherry developed Middleton's defensive skills, making him a solid two-way player. Hodge played only one more season before his career ended, while Middleton became a star in Boston. Middleton made his debut for the Bruins on October 7, 1976, versus the Minnesota North Stars and scored a hat trick in a 6–2 Bruins victory. Middleton went on to appear in 72 games for the Bruins that year and scored 22 goals and 20 assists. During the postseason, Middleton appeared in 13 of the 14 games, scoring nine points (5 goals and 4 assists) and he and the Bruins reached the Stanley Cup Final; however, they were swept by the Montreal Canadiens.

The following year, during the 1977–78 season, Middleton had one of his best single-game performances vs. the Cleveland Barons on March 21, 1978, when he scored two goals and three assists in a 5–3 Bruins win. He went on to appear in 79 regular-season games for the Bruins and scored 25 goals and 35 assists for 60 total points. That year, he appeared in all 15 postseason games, scoring seven points (5 goals and 2 assists), as the Bruins once again reached the Stanley Cup Final, but just like the previous year, they were defeated by the Canadiens 4–2.

The 1978–79 season saw Middleton have his first 30-plus-goal season as his numbers improved. In 79 games, he became a point-per-game player, scoring 38 goals and 48 assists. Middleton appeared in 11 postseason games that year and scored 12 points (4 goals and 8 assists). The Bruins defeated Pittsburgh in the quarterfinals but lost in heartbreaking fashion vs. the Canadiens in Game 7 of the semifinals. The following year, during the 1979–80 season, Middleton played in all 80 games for the first time in his career. He was once again a point-per-game player throughout the season, scoring both 40 goals and 50-plus assists for the first time, finishing the regular season with 92 total points. Middleton appeared in 10 postseason games, scoring 4 goals and 2 assists, as the Bruins were defeated by the New York Islanders 4–1 in the quarterfinals. During the offseason, Middleton signed a five-year contract extension with the Bruins.

The 1980–81 season saw the Bruins hire former goalie and Middleton’s teammate, Gerry Cheevers, as their new head coach. Cheevers started playing Middleton on the power play, penalty kill and first line, with Middleton now playing 20–30 minutes per game. That year, Middleton played all 80 games for a second straight season and with his newly extended playing time, he went on to have his first 100-plus-point season, scoring 44 goals and a career-best 59 assists. For his efforts, Middleton was selected to play in his first NHL All-Star Game. Despite his play, the Bruins were eliminated by Minnesota 3–0 in the first round.

Starting in the 1981 season, Middleton became one of the premier wingers in the league when rookie Barry Pederson was placed on his line at center. He and Pederson clicked immediately and had three of the best seasons together of any two linemates in NHL history. Together, from 1981–84, they posted over 200 points per season. One of Middleton’s best seasons came in 1981–82, during which he played in 75 games and scored a career-high 51 goals and 43 assists for 94 total points. During a game on January 7, 1982, vs. the Winnipeg Jets, he tied a single-game best with 5 points (2 goals and 3 assists). Middleton also won the Lady Byng Trophy for excellence and sportsmanship, finishing the year with just 12 penalty minutes. In addition, he finished seventh in league scoring, placed first among all NHL players in shooting percentage with a 25.2% and was named to the NHL's Second All-Star Team. The Bruins defeated the Buffalo Sabres in the first round, 3–1, but were defeated by Quebec, 4–3, in the quarterfinals. Middleton scored 6 goals and 9 assists in 11 playoff appearances.

The following season in 1982–83, Middleton appeared in all 80 regular season games and scored 96 points (49 goals, 47 assists), as he led the Bruins to the league's best regular season record. During the postseason he set multiple unbroken records that year for the most points scored in the playoffs by a player not advancing to the finals (33 in 17 games) and for a single playoff series (19, in the quarterfinals against Buffalo). The Bruins were then eliminated in the semifinals 4-2 by the Islanders.

Middleton’s best statistical season came the following year during the 1983–84 season when appeared in all 80 games for the fourth time and scored 105 points (47 goals 58 assists) in which he tied Ken Hodge's team record for most points scored in a season by a right winger and remains unbroken. That year he scored his 300th career goal on January 29, 1984 vs. the Canadians, and was named to his third and final NHL All-Star game. During the postseason he and the Bruins were swept 3-0 in the first round by the Canadians. The following year in 1983-84 Middleton would appear in all 80 games for a fifth in final time. His numbers would start to decline however he still managed to nearly be a point per game player finishing with 76 points season with 30 goals and 46 assists. Middleton scored 3 goals in 5 playoff games as the Bruins lost in the first round to Montreal.

His leadership was apparent in being named co-captain (with Ray Bourque) to succeed Terry O'Reilly in 1985–86, a position he held until he retired, wearing the "C" during home games and Bourque would wear it at away games. During that season Middleton struggled to stay healthy as injuries in his shoulder early in the season, he then missed the end of the year with a concussion suffered after being hit in head with puck during practice on February 7, 1986. In total appeared in 49 games that season, scoring 14 goals and 30 assists for 44 points.

After suffering a concussion the previous year Middleton began to wear a helmet thereafter and recovered enough to appear in 76 games in 1986–87, going on to score 31 goals tally 36 assists for 68 points the following season. Middleton scored 2 goals and 2 assists in four playoff games as he and the Bruins were swept by Montreal in the opening round.

However, the next season would be his last in the NHL in 1987–88, which saw him play on the third line (with additions after the Winter Olympics adding help for the Bruins) and suffer a broken rib during the season. He appeared in 59 regular season games that year scoring 13 goals (a career low) and 19 assists. During the postseason, he appeared in all 19 playoff games scoring 10 points (5 goals, 5 assists) he and the Bruins reached the Stanley Cup Final that year, where they were swept by the Edmonton Oilers. Bruins GM Harry Sinden bought out his option year and Middleton decided to play in Switzerland rather than trying to find a way to play with an NHL team to pursue 1,000 career points, which he was 12 points short of. He did not enjoy his brief time in Swiss hockey to where it soured him on playing again; he was called by the Bruins prior to the 1989–90 season if he wanted to return, which he declined, citing that he was "hockey'd out"; he later stated his regret at not finding a way to pursue the 1,000 point milestone. He retired with 448 goals and 540 assists for 988 points in 1,005 games and added 100 points in 114 playoff games.

Middleton made a brief comeback, playing one season in Switzerland in 1988–89 for EHC Bülach, scoring 11 goals and 14 assists in 25 games; however, he officially retired from the sport at the end of the season.

Middleton scored 25 shorthanded goals for Boston—a Bruins' team record that was surpassed by Brad Marchand in 2018–19. Middleton had held the club record for more than 30 years since overtaking Derek Sanderson's record of 24. During his career, he recorded four 20-goal seasons, three 30-goal seasons, four 40-goal seasons and one 50-goal season.

At the time of his retirement following the 1987–88 season, Middleton ranked third on the Boston Bruins' all-time regular-season scoring list (trailing only Johnny Bucyk and Phil Esposito) with 402 goals and 496 assists for 898 points—10 more than Bobby Orr accumulated. He was only the third Bruin to score 400 goals for the team. As of 2026, he ranks seventh in all-time points.

Middleton is one of just seven Bruins to record 100 playoff points. Middleton was regarded as one of the best one-on-one players of all time and currently ranks second all-time in career shooting percentage (19.7) among players with 400+ goals.

On November 29, 2018, the Boston Bruins retired Middleton's #16 before a game against the New York Islanders at TD Garden.

=== International play ===
Middleton also starred in international play and made his debut for Team Canada in the 1981 Canada Cup. He appeared in seven games during the tournament, scoring 1 goal and 2 assists, as Team Canada was defeated by the Soviet Union, 8–1, in the final.

Middleton made his second and final stint with Team Canada in the 1984 Canada Cup, where he teamed on the top line with Wayne Gretzky and Michel Goulet. He recorded 4 goals and 4 assists in seven games and Team Canada went on to defeat Sweden in the final to win the gold medal.

== Coaching career ==
In 2001 Paul Edwards, informed Middleton that the US Paralympic Sled Hockey team was looking for a new coach after their other coach quit. Edwards then asked Middleton if he knew what sled hockey was. Middleton told him that he had even though he had never seen it played and in June 2001 he was officially named head coach. Serving as a head coach of the United States 2002 Paralympic Sled Hockey team, Middleton would end up taking a team that were considerable underdogs (they had only one game in their entire history up to that point) to great heights. The team would go 5-0 in the preliminary round, then leading the team to their first ever gold medal with a 4-3 victory over Norway. This made them the first American team to win gold in the Paralympic Games. The team would later be inducted into both the U.S. Olympic & Paralympic Hall of Fame in 2022 and the USA hockey hall of fame in 2024.

== Retirement ==
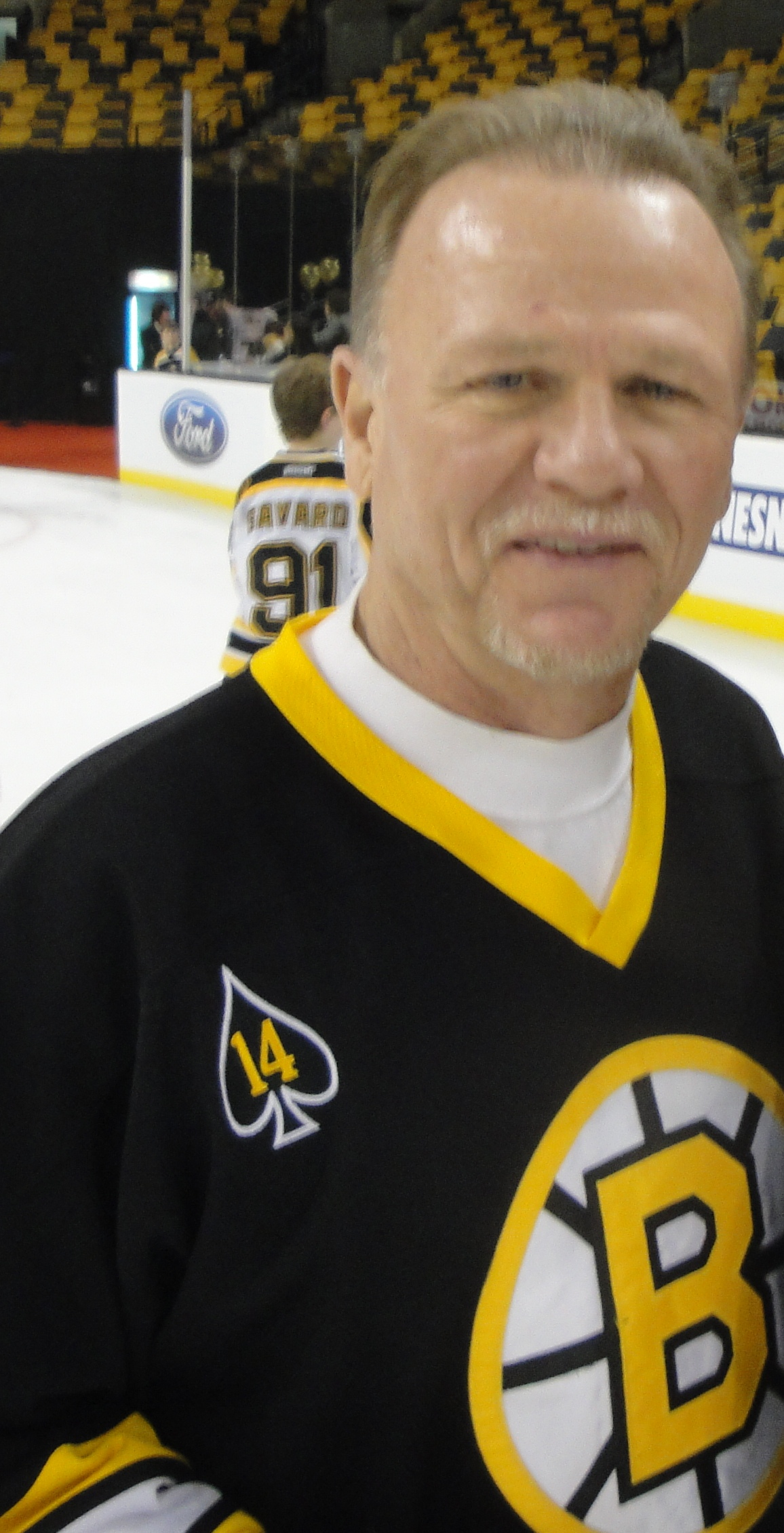
Middleton in 2010

After retirement, Middleton started his own business, named Rick Middleton Enterprises, in which he published wholesale catalogs for barber and beauty shops nationwide.

In 1990, alongside his old business partner CB Sullivan, the two would start their own yearly celebrity golf tournament. That featured various New England athletes. The event lasted for over 20 years.October 4, 2001, to October. 9, 2002 Middleton served as the radio commentator for the Manchester Monarchs of the AHL. Middleton was also a studio analyst for New England Sports Network (NESN), which covers the Boston Bruins, from 2002 to 2007.

He was one of five plaintiffs along with Dave Forbes, Brad Park, Ulf Nilsson and Doug Smail in Forbes v. Eagleson, a class action lawsuit filed in 1995 on behalf of about 1,000 NHL players who were employed by NHL teams between 1972 and 1991 against Alan Eagleson, the league and its member clubs. The players alleged that the NHL and its teams violated the Racketeer Influenced and Corrupt Organizations (RICO) Act by colluding with Eagleson to enable him to embezzle from the National Hockey League Players' Association (NHLPA) and that the four-year statute of limitations in civil racketeering cases began when Eagleson was indicted in 1994. The lawsuit was dismissed on August 27, 1998, in United States District Court for the Eastern District of Pennsylvania by Thomas Newman O'Neill Jr. who ruled that the statute of limitations expired because it had begun in 1991 when the players were made aware of the allegations against Eagleson. O'Neill's decision was upheld in the United States Court of Appeals for the Third Circuit on October 17, 2000. Joe McDonald speculated in a May 14, 2020 article in The Athletic that Middleton's participation in the lawsuit jeopardized his chances of induction into the Hockey Hall of Fame.

In 2007, he became the president of the Boston Bruins Alumni group, a position he held till 2022 when he officially retired. During his tenure the Bruins Alumni grew to play over 30 benefit games annually to help raise funds for over 30 different organizations. He now serves as a brand ambassador for the team. In addition, Middleton served as a partner in Orlanda Energy Systems, along with joining with New England High School Sports Showcases, running high school hockey showcases beginning in June 2014.

Middleton has also been inducted into a number of hall of fames since retirement: in 2005, he was inducted into the Oshawa Generals Hall of Fame, in 2012, the Massachusetts Hockey Hall of Fame and finally, the New Hampshire Legends of Hockey Hall of Fame in 2014.

== Personal life ==
Middleton now resides in Hampton, New Hampshire. He is married to his wife, Liz and has two stepchildren. He has three biological children from a previous marriage: two sons, Jarret and Brett and a daughter, Claudine. He spends his free time fishing and playing golf. On March 27, 2015, Middleton became a U.S. citizen.

Middleton has also been involved in charitable organizations in New England. He has been involved with the Ace Bailey Foundation since its inception in 2001 and was later awarded the foundation’s Ace Bailey Good Guy Award in 2015. Middleton remained active with the charity until it closed in 2020. He continues to participate in local golf and hockey events to help raise money for multiple charities. He also helps raise funds for Hampton, New Hampshire’s soup kitchens and the Hampton Youth Association.

On July 16, 2019, the town of Hampton held a special celebration for Middleton, “Nifty Night.” Town Selectman Regina Barnes read a proclamation from the town honoring and thanking him, while representatives from the Hampton Beach Village District presented him with a plaque.

== Career statistics ==
=== Regular season and playoffs ===
			Regular season					Playoffs
Season	Team	League	GP	G	A	Pts	PIM	GP	G	A	Pts	PIM
1971–72	Oshawa Generals	OHA-Jr.	53	36	34	70	24	12	5	5	10	2
1972–73	Oshawa Generals	OHA-Jr.	62	67	70	137	14	—	—	—	—	—
1973–74	Providence Reds	AHL	63	36	48	84	14	15	9	6	15	2
1974–75	New York Rangers	NHL	47	22	18	40	19	3	0	0	0	2
1975–76	New York Rangers	NHL	77	24	26	50	14	—	—	—	—	—
1976–77	Boston Bruins	NHL	72	20	22	42	2	13	5	4	9	0
1977–78	Boston Bruins	NHL	79	25	35	60	8	15	5	2	7	0
1978–79	Boston Bruins	NHL	71	38	48	86	7	11	4	8	12	0
1979–80	Boston Bruins	NHL	80	40	52	92	24	10	4	2	6	5
1980–81	Boston Bruins	NHL	80	44	59	103	16	3	0	1	1	2
1981–82	Boston Bruins	NHL	75	51	43	94	12	11	6	9	15	0
1982–83	Boston Bruins	NHL	80	49	47	96	8	17	11	22	33	6
1983–84	Boston Bruins	NHL	80	47	58	105	14	3	0	0	0	0
1984–85	Boston Bruins	NHL	80	30	46	76	6	5	3	0	3	0
1985–86	Boston Bruins	NHL	49	14	30	44	10	—	—	—	—	—
1986–87	Boston Bruins	NHL	76	31	37	68	6	4	2	2	4	0
1987–88	Boston Bruins	NHL	59	13	19	32	11	19	5	5	10	4
1988–89	EHC Bülach	NLB	17	11	14	25	18	—	—	—	—	—
NHL totals			1,005	448	540	988	157	114	45	55	100	19

=== International ===
Year	Team	Event	Result	GP	G	A	Pts	PIM
1981	Canada	CC	2nd place, silver medalist(s)	7	1	2	3	0
1984	Canada	CC	1st place, gold medalist(s)	7	4	4	8	0
Senior totals				14	5	6	11	0

== Awards, honors and achievements ==
- Won Red Tilson Trophy (OHL Most Outstanding Player) in 1973.
- Won Dudley "Red" Garrett Memorial Award (AHL Rookie of the Year) in 1974.
- Named to the AHL First All-Star Team in 1974.
- Seventh Player Award — 1979
- Elizabeth C. Dufresne Trophy — 1979, 1981, 1982, 1984
- Bruins Three Stars Awards — 1979, 1980, 1981, 1982, 1983, 1984
- NHL All-Star Game — 1981, 1982, 1984
- 1981 Canada Cup Silver Medal
- Won NHL Lady Byng Memorial Trophy in 1982.
- Named to the NHL Second All-Star Team in 1982.
- 1984 Canada Cup Gold Medal
- inducted into the Oshawa Generals Hall of Fame in 2005
- Inducted into the Massachusetts hockey Hall of Fame in 2012
- His #16 jersey number was retired by the Boston Bruins on November 29, 2018.
- Named One of the Top 100 Best Bruins Players of all Time.
- Named to the Boston Bruins All-Centennial Team.
- Coached the United States 2002 Paralympic Sled Hockey team to a Gold medal at the 2002 Paralympic Olympics.
- Inducted into the New Hampshire legend’s of hockey Hall of Fame in 2014
- In 2018, Middleton was honored by the Sports Museum’s Tradition event at the TD garden as part of that year's class and being given the hockey legacy award.
- Inducted into the U.S. Olympic & Paralympic Hall of Fame 2022 as the coach of the 2002 United States Paralympic Sled hockey team.
- Inducted into the U.S hockey hall of fame in 2024 as a member of the 2002 United States Paralympic Sled hockey team.

== NHL records ==
- Most points in one playoff series: (19)
- Most shorthanded assists in a single playoff game (2)
- Most even strength points in a single playoff game (6)
- Highest playoff points per game average in one post-season by a right winger: (1.94)
- Highest playoff assists per game average in one post-season by a right winger: (1.29)
- Highest plus/minus in a single playoff game for a forward (+6)
- Most even strength assists in a single game for a right winger (4)

== See also ==
- List of NHL players with 1,000 games played
- List of NHL players with 50-goal seasons
- List of NHL players with 100-point seasons

Preceded by Terry O'Reilly	Boston Bruins captain 1985–88, with Ray Bourque	Succeeded by Ray Bourque
Preceded by Rick Kehoe	Winner of the Lady Byng Trophy; 1982	Succeeded by Mike Bossy
Preceded by Bob MacMillan	New York Rangers first-round draft pick 1973	Succeeded by Dave Maloney
