= Scott Fusco =

American ice hockey player (born 1963)

- Born: 21 January 1963 (age 63) Burlington, Massachusetts, U.S.
- Height: 5 ft 9 in (175 cm)
- Weight: 174 lb (79 kg; 12 st 6 lb)
- Position: Center
- Shot: Left
- Played for: EHC Olten
- National team: United States
- NHL draft: 211th overall, 1982; New Jersey Devils
- Playing career: 1986–1988

Scott Michael Fusco (born January 21, 1963) is an American former ice hockey player. Fusco attended Belmont Hill School before going to Harvard. In college, Fusco won the Hobey Baker Award in 1986. He was also a member of the American 1984 Winter Olympics ice hockey team. He was inducted into the United States Hockey Hall of Fame in 2002 and is assistant coach of the Irish national hockey team. His older brother Mark is also a hockey player of note.

== Career statistics ==
=== Regular season and playoffs ===
			Regular season					Playoffs
Season	Team	League	GP	G	A	Pts	PIM	GP	G	A	Pts	PIM
1980–81	Belmont Hill School	HS-Prep	—	—	—	—	—	—	—	—	—	—
1981–82	Harvard Crimson	ECAC	28	16	20	36	20	—	—	—	—	—
1982–83	Harvard Crimson	ECAC	32	33	22	55	22	—	—	—	—	—
1983–84	United States	Intl	65	22	31	53	59	—	—	—	—	—
1984–85	Harvard Crimson	ECAC	32	34	47	81	24	—	—	—	—	—
1985–86	Harvard Crimson	ECAC	31	24	44	68	37	—	—	—	—	—
1986–87	EHC Olten	NDA	30	27	17	44	25	—	—	—	—	—
ECAC totals			123	107	133	240	103	—	—	—	—	—
NDA totals			30	27	17	44	25	—	—	—	—	—

=== International ===
Year	Team	Event	GP	G	A	Pts	PIM
1982	United States	WJC	6	5	4	9	0
1984	United States	OG	6	1	3	4	4
1988	United States	OG	6	4	3	7	4
Junior totals			6	5	4	9	0
Senior totals			12	5	6	11	8

== Awards and honors ==
Award	Year
All-ECAC Hockey First Team	1982–83
All-NCAA All-Tournament Team	1983
All-ECAC Hockey First Team	1984–85
AHCA East First-Team All-American	1984–85
All-ECAC Hockey First Team	1985–86
AHCA East First-Team All-American	1985–86

Awards and achievements
Preceded by Cleon Daskalakis	ECAC Hockey Player of the Year; 1984–85; 1985–86	Succeeded by Joe Nieuwendyk
Preceded by Bill Watson	Winner of the Hobey Baker Award; 1985–86	Succeeded by Tony Hrkac
