= Hobey Baker Award =

NCAA award for the outstanding men's ice hockey player

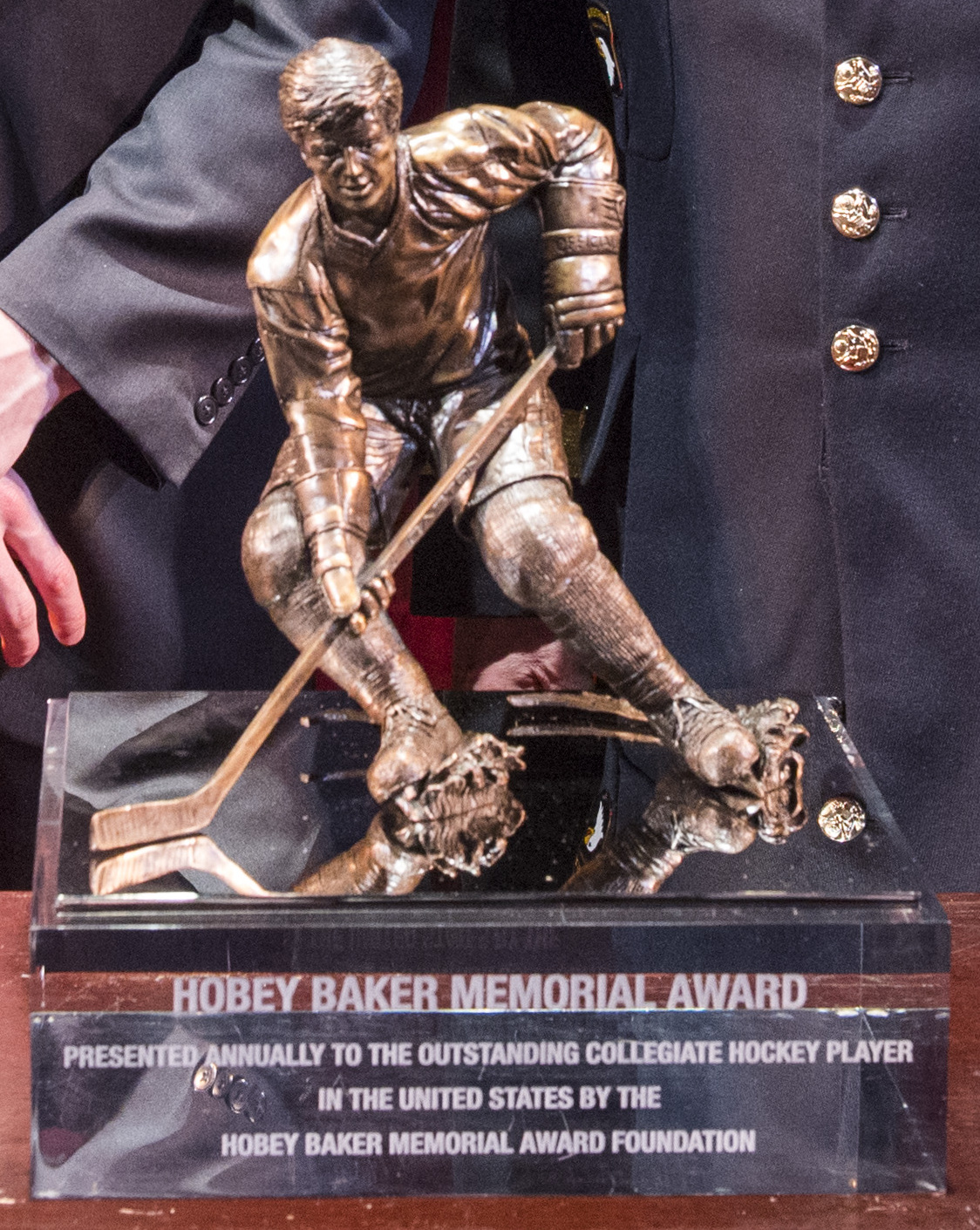
- The Hobey Baker Award trophy
- Sport: Ice hockey
- Awarded for: NCAA player who best "exhibits strength of character both on and off the ice" and "contributes to the integrity of the team and displays outstanding skills in all phases of the game".

History
- First award: 1981
- First winner: Neal Broten (Minnesota)
- Most recent: Max Plante (Minnesota Duluth)

The Hobey Baker Award is an annual award given to the top National Collegiate Athletic Association men's ice hockey player. It has been awarded 44 times. It is named for Hall of Famer Hobey Baker, who played college hockey at Princeton University and died shortly after World War I.

The original statue for the award was commissioned and awarded by the Decathlon Athletic Club (now defunct) in Bloomington, Minnesota. The model for the award trophy was Steve Christoff, who played for the University of Minnesota and in the National Hockey League.

Minnesota Duluth players have won the award seven times, the most all-time. Harvard, Minnesota, and Boston University are all tied for second place, with four wins a piece. Max Plante, of Minnesota Duluth, is the most recent winner.

== Award winners ==
*	Inducted into the Hockey Hall of Fame

Winners
Year	Winner	Position	School	Born
1981	Neal Broten	Center	Minnesota	Roseau, Minnesota
1982	George McPhee	Left wing	Bowling Green	Guelph, Ontario
1983	Mark Fusco	Defense	Harvard	Burlington, Massachusetts
1984	Tom Kurvers	Defense	Minnesota Duluth	Minneapolis, Minnesota
1985	Bill Watson	Right wing	Minnesota Duluth	Pine Falls, Manitoba
1986	Scott Fusco	Center	Harvard	Burlington, Massachusetts
1987	Tony Hrkac	Center	North Dakota	Thunder Bay, Ontario
1988	Robb Stauber	Goaltender	Minnesota	Duluth, Minnesota
1989	Lane MacDonald	Left wing	Harvard	Tulsa, Oklahoma
1990	Kip Miller	Center	Michigan State	Lansing, Michigan
1991	David Emma	Center	Boston College	Cranston, Rhode Island
1992	Scott Pellerin	Left wing	Maine	Shediac, New Brunswick
1993	Paul Kariya*	Left wing	Maine	Vancouver, British Columbia
1994	Chris Marinucci	Left wing	Minnesota Duluth	Grand Rapids, Minnesota
1995	Brian Holzinger	Center	Bowling Green	Parma, Ohio
1996	Brian Bonin	Center	Minnesota	White Bear Lake, Minnesota
1997	Brendan Morrison	Center	Michigan	Pitt Meadows, British Columbia
1998	Chris Drury	Left wing	Boston University	Trumbull, Connecticut
1999	Jason Krog	Center	New Hampshire	Fernie, British Columbia
2000	Mike Mottau	Defense	Boston College	Boston, Massachusetts
2001	Ryan Miller	Goaltender	Michigan State	East Lansing, Michigan
2002	Jordan Leopold	Defense	Minnesota	Golden Valley, Minnesota
2003	Peter Sejna	Left wing	Colorado College	Liptovský Mikuláš, Czechoslovakia
2004	Junior Lessard	Right wing	Minnesota Duluth	Saint-Joseph-de-Beauce, Quebec
2005	Marty Sertich	Center	Colorado College	Roseville, Minnesota
2006	Matt Carle	Defense	Denver	Anchorage, Alaska
2007	Ryan Duncan	Left wing	North Dakota	Calgary, Alberta
2008	Kevin Porter	Center	Michigan	Northville, Michigan
2009	Matt Gilroy	Defense	Boston University	North Bellmore, New York
2010	Blake Geoffrion	Center	Wisconsin	Plantation, Florida
2011	Andy Miele	Left wing	Miami	Grosse Pointe Woods, Michigan
2012	Jack Connolly	Center	Minnesota Duluth	Duluth, Minnesota
2013	Drew LeBlanc	Center	St. Cloud State	Duluth, Minnesota
2014	Johnny Gaudreau	Left wing	Boston College	Salem, New Jersey
2015	Jack Eichel	Center	Boston University	North Chelmsford, Massachusetts
2016	Jimmy Vesey	Left wing	Harvard	Boston, Massachusetts
2017	Will Butcher	Defense	Denver	Sun Prairie, Wisconsin
2018	Adam Gaudette	Center	Northeastern	Braintree, Massachusetts
2019	Cale Makar	Defense	Massachusetts	Calgary, Alberta
2020	Scott Perunovich	Defense	Minnesota Duluth	Hibbing, Minnesota
2021	Cole Caufield	Right wing	Wisconsin	Stevens Point, Wisconsin
2022	Dryden McKay	Goaltender	Minnesota State	Downers Grove, Illinois
2023	Adam Fantilli	Center	Michigan	Nobleton, Ontario
2024	Macklin Celebrini	Center	Boston University	North Vancouver, British Columbia
2025	Isaac Howard	Left wing	Michigan State	Hudson, Wisconsin
2026	Max Plante	Left wing	Minnesota Duluth	Duluth, Minnesota

=== Winners by school ===
Winners by school
School	Winners
Minnesota Duluth	7
Harvard	4
Minnesota	4
Boston University	4
Boston College	3
Michigan	3
Michigan State	3
Bowling Green	2
Colorado College	2
Denver	2
Maine	2
North Dakota	2
Wisconsin	2
Massachusetts	1
Miami	1
New Hampshire	1
Northeastern	1
St. Cloud State	1
Minnesota State	1

=== Winners by place of birth ===
Winners by place of birth
Birthplace	Winners
Minnesota	11
Massachusetts	6
British Columbia	4
Michigan	4
Ontario	3
Wisconsin	3
Alberta	2
Alaska	1
Connecticut	1
Czechoslovakia	1
Florida	1
Manitoba	1
New Brunswick	1
New Jersey	1
New York	1
Ohio	1
Oklahoma	1
Quebec	1
Rhode Island	1
Illinois	1

=== Winners by position ===
Winners by position
Position	Winners
Center	18
Left wing	11
Defense	11
Right wing	6
Goaltender	3

== Award finalists ==
Finalists
Year	Finalists	Position	School	Finalists	Position	School
1981	Steve Ulseth	Left wing	Minnesota			
1982	Ron Scott	Goaltender	Michigan St.			
1983	Randy Velischek	Defense	Providence			
1984	Cleon Daskalakis	Goaltender	Boston University			
1985	Scott Fusco	Center	Harvard			
1986	Dan Dorion	Right wing	Western Michigan	Mike Donnelly	Left wing	Michigan St.
1987	Wayne Gagné	Defense	Western Michigan			
1988	Mark Vermette	Right wing	Lake Superior State			
1989	Robb Stauber	Goaltender	Minnesota			
1990	Greg Brown	Defense	Boston College			
1991	Brad Werenka	Defense	Northern Michigan			
1992	Daniel Laperriere	Defense	St. Lawrence			
1993	Greg Johnson	Center	North Dakota			
1994	Craig Conroy	Center	Clarkson			
1995	Chris Imes	Defense	Maine			
1996	Jay Pandolfo	Left wing	Boston University			
1997	Chris Drury	Left wing	Boston University			
1998	Chad Alban	Goaltender	Michigan St.			
1999	Mike York	Center	Michigan St.			
2000	Steve Reinprecht	Center	Wisconsin			
2001	Brian Gionta	Right wing	Boston College	Jeff Panzer	Center	North Dakota
2002	Mark Hartigan	Center	St. Cloud State	Darren Haydar	Right wing	New Hampshire
2003	Chris Kunitz	Left wing	Ferris State	David LeNeveu	Goaltender	Cornell
2004	Yann Danis	Goaltender	Brown	Zach Parise	Left wing	North Dakota
2005	Brett Sterling	Left wing	Colorado College	David McKee	Goaltender	Cornell
2006	Brian Elliott	Goaltender	Wisconsin	Chris Collins	Left wing	Boston College
2007	David Brown	Goaltender	Notre Dame	Eric Ehn	Center	Air Force
2008	Ryan Jones	Right wing	Miami University	Nathan Gerbe	Left wing	Boston College
2009	Brad Thiessen	Goaltender	Northeastern	Colin Wilson	Left wing	Boston University
2010	Gustav Nyquist	Left wing	Maine	Bobby Butler	Right wing	New Hampshire
2011	Matt Frattin	Right wing	North Dakota	Cam Atkinson	Right wing	Boston College
2012	Spencer Abbott	Left wing	Maine	Austin Smith	Right wing	Colgate
2013	Eric Hartzell	Goaltender	Quinnipiac	Johnny Gaudreau	Center	Boston College
2014	Greg Carey	Left wing	St. Lawrence	Nic Dowd	Center	St. Cloud State
2015	Jimmy Vesey	Center	Harvard	Zane McIntyre	Goaltender	North Dakota
2016	Kyle Connor	Left wing	Michigan	Thatcher Demko	Goaltender	Boston College
2017	Zach Aston-Reese	Center	Northeastern	Mike Vecchione	Center	Union
2018	Ryan Donato	Center	Harvard	Henrik Borgström	Center	Denver
2019	Adam Fox	Defense	Harvard	Jimmy Schuldt	Defense	St. Cloud State
2020	Jeremy Swayman	Goaltender	Maine	Jordan Kawaguchi	Center	North Dakota
2021	Dryden McKay	Goaltender	Minnesota State	Shane Pinto	Center	North Dakota
2022	Bobby Brink	Right wing	Denver	Ben Meyers	Center	Minnesota
2023	Matthew Knies	Left wing	Minnesota	Logan Cooley	Center	Minnesota
2024	Jackson Blake	Right wing	North Dakota	Cutter Gauthier	Forward	Boston College
2025	Zeev Buium	Defence	Denver	Ryan Leonard	Forward	Boston College
2026	T. J. Hughes	Forward	Michigan	Eric Pohlkamp	Defence	Denver

=== Finalists by school ===
Finalists by school
School	Finalists
Boston College	9
North Dakota	8
Minnesota	5
Boston University	5
Denver	4
Harvard	4
Maine	4
Michigan State	3
St. Cloud State	3
Cornell	2
Michigan	2
New Hampshire	2
Northeastern	2
St. Lawrence	2
Western Michigan	2
Wisconsin	2
Air Force	1
Brown	1
Clarkson	1
Colgate	1
Colorado College	1
Ferris State	1
Lake Superior State	1
Miami University	1
Minnesota State	1
Northern Michigan	1
Notre Dame	1
Providence	1
Quinnipiac	1
Union	1

== See also ==
- Patty Kazmaier Award – D-I women's equivalent
- Sid Watson Award – D-III men's equivalent
- Laura Hurd Award – D-III women's equivalent
- Hobey Baker Legends of College Hockey Award
