= Frank Simonetti =

American ice hockey player (born 1962)

- Born: September 11, 1962 (age 64) Melrose, Massachusetts, U.S.
- Height: 6 ft 1 in (185 cm)
- Weight: 190 lb (86 kg; 13 st 8 lb)
- Position: Defense
- Shot: Right
- Played for: Boston Bruins
- NHL draft: Undrafted
- Playing career: 1984–1988

Frank Simonetti (born September 11, 1962 in Melrose, Massachusetts) is an American retired professional ice hockey defenseman who played 115 games in the National Hockey League (NHL) for the Boston Bruins between 1984 and 1988. Prior to turning professional Simonetti spent two years at Norwich University.

== Playing career ==
As a youth, Simonetti played in the 1975 Quebec International Pee-Wee Hockey Tournament with the Boston Braves minor ice hockey team. He went on to play two seasons with Norwich University, an on October 4, 1984 was signed as a free agent by the Boston Bruins of the National Hockey League. He played 115 games for the Bruins over four seasons from 1984 to 1988, also spending time with the Bruins' American Hockey League affiliates the Hershey Bears, Moncton Golden Flames, and Maine Mariners.

In 2023 he took over as the president of the Bruins alumni organization.

== Career statistics ==
=== Regular season and playoffs ===
			Regular season					Playoffs
Season	Team	League	GP	G	A	Pts	PIM	GP	G	A	Pts	PIM
1982–83	Norwich University	NCAA III	—	—	—	—	—	—	—	—	—	—
1983–84	Norwich University	NCAA III	18	9	19	28	32	—	—	—	—	—
1984–85	Boston Bruins	NHL	43	1	5	6	26	5	0	1	1	2
1984–85	Hershey Bears	AHL	31	0	6	6	14	—	—	—	—	—
1985–86	Boston Bruins	NHL	17	1	0	1	14	3	0	0	0	0
1985–86	Moncton Golden Flames	AHL	5	0	0	0	2	—	—	—	—	—
1986–87	Boston Bruins	NHL	25	1	0	1	17	4	0	0	0	6
1986–87	Moncton Golden Flames	AHL	7	0	1	1	6	—	—	—	—	—
1987–88	Boston Bruins	NHL	30	2	3	5	19	—	—	—	—	—
1987–88	Maine Mariners	AHL	7	0	1	1	4	2	0	0	0	2
NHL totals			115	5	8	13	76	12	0	1	1	8

== Bibliography ==
- Diamond, Dan, ed. (2002), Total Hockey: The Official Encyclopedia of the National Hockey League, Second Edition, New York: Total Sports Publishing, ISBN 1-892129-85-X
