= Cleon Daskalakis =

American ice hockey player

- Born: September 29, 1962 (age 63) Boston, Massachusetts, U.S.
- Height: 5 ft 9 in (175 cm)
- Weight: 174 lb (79 kg; 12 st 6 lb)
- Position: Goaltender
- Caught: Left
- Played for: Boston Bruins
- National team: United States
- NHL draft: Undrafted
- Playing career: 1984–1993

Cleon Nicholas Daskalakis (born September 29, 1962) is an American former professional hockey goaltender. From 1984 to 1987, he served as a goaltender for the Boston Bruins in the National Hockey League (NHL).

== Early life and education ==
Daskalakis was born in Boston and began to skate at 10 years old. He was the starting goalie at Thayer Academy as a 13-year-old freshman, and the MVP of the team USA's World JR. Team in Germany at 17 and start at Boston University during the same season. After four years at Boston University, where he was ECAC College player of the year, first-team All-American, and First Runner Up for The Hobey Baker as the country's best college player in his senior year, he began his pro-career signing with the Boston Bruins. He was named to the Eastern College Athletic Conference All-Star Second Team in 1982–83 and First Team in 1983–84. He was also named to the National Collegiate Athletic Association (East) All-American First Team, 1983–84. Daskalakis also represented the United States at the 1989 World Ice Hockey Championships. To this day, Daskalakis' presence adorns the walls of the Hall of Fame at Boston University as their star player, and he is a member of the Boston University Athletics Hall of Fame.

== Career ==
Daskalakis' career included three and a half seasons with the Bruins, Championships in Hershey and in Helsinki, Finland for Jokerit where other former Bruins Goaltender Tim Thomas tended goal. He represented Team USA on three other occasions, including the World Championship Team in Sweden in 1989.

== Career statistics ==
=== Regular season and playoffs ===
			Regular season									Playoffs
Season	Team	League	GP	W	L	T	MIN	GA	SO	GAA	SV%	GP	W	L	MIN	GA	SO	GAA	SV%
1979–80	South Shore Bruins	NEJHL	24	—	—	—	1165	63	0	3.24	—	—	—	—	—	—	—	—	—
1980–81	Boston University	ECAC	8	4	2	0	399	24	0	3.61	—	—	—	—	—	—	—	—	—
1981–82	Boston University	ECAC	20	9	6	3	1101	59	3	3.22	.909	—	—	—	—	—	—	—	—
1982–83	Boston University	ECAC	24	15	7	1	1398	78	1	3.35	—	—	—	—	—	—	—	—	—
1983–84	Boston University	ECAC	35	25	10	0	1972	96	1	2.92	.911	—	—	—	—	—	—	—	—
1984–85	Boston Bruins	NHL	8	1	2	1	290	24	0	4.97	.830	—	—	—	—	—	—	—	—
1984–85	Hershey Bears	AHL	30	9	13	4	1614	119	0	4.42	.862	—	—	—	—	—	—	—	—
1985–86	Boston Bruins	NHL	2	0	2	0	120	10	0	5.02	.841	—	—	—	—	—	—	—	—
1985–86	Moncton Golden Flames	AHL	41	19	14	6	2343	141	0	3.61	.873	6	4	1	372	13	0	2.10	—
1986–87	Boston Bruins	NHL	2	2	0	0	97	7	0	4.34	.863	—	—	—	—	—	—	—	—
1986–87	Moncton Golden Flames	AHL	27	8	14	0	1452	118	0	4.88	.828	1	0	0	36	2	0	3.33	—
1987–88	Hershey Bears	AHL	3	1	1	0	122	9	0	4.43	.845	—	—	—	—	—	—	—	—
1987–88	Binghamton Whalers	AHL	6	2	2	1	344	27	0	4.71	.835	—	—	—	—	—	—	—	—
1987–88	Rochester Americans	AHL	8	4	3	0	382	22	0	3.46	.893	—	—	—	—	—	—	—	—
1987–88	Milwaukee Admirals	IHL	9	1	5	3	483	47	0	5.84	—	—	—	—	—	—	—	—	—
1988–89	Jokerit	FIN-2	21	—	—	—	677	74	0	6.56	—	—	—	—	—	—	—	—	—
NHL totals			12	3	4	1	70	5	0	4.35	.815	—	—	—	—	—	—	—	—

=== International ===
Year	Team	Event	GP	W	L	T	MIN	GA	SO	GAA	SV%
1981	United States	WJC	3	—	—	—	141	14	0	5.95	—
1989	United States	WC	1	0	0	0	20	1	0	3.00	—
Junior totals			3	—	—	—	141	14	0	5.95	—
Senior totals			1	0	0	0	20	1	0	3.00	—

== Awards and honors ==
Award	Year
All-ECAC Hockey Second Team	1982–83
All-ECAC Hockey First Team	1983–84
AHCA East First-Team All-American	1983–84

Awards and achievements
Preceded by Randy Velischek	ECAC Hockey Player of the Year; 1983–84	Succeeded by Scott Fusco
