= 1986–87 IHL season =

North American ice hockey season

The 1986–87 IHL season was the 42nd season of the International Hockey League, a North American minor professional league. Nine teams participated in the regular season, and the Salt Lake Golden Eagles won the Turner Cup.

== Regular season ==
| East Division | GP | W | L | T | OTL | GF | GA | Pts |
|---|---|---|---|---|---|---|---|---|
| Muskegon Lumberjacks | 82 | 47 | 30 | 0 | 5 | 366 | 286 | 99 |
| Saginaw Generals | 82 | 44 | 32 | 0 | 6 | 383 | 344 | 94 |
| Flint Spirits | 82 | 42 | 33 | 0 | 7 | 343 | 361 | 91 |
| Kalamazoo Wings | 82 | 36 | 38 | 0 | 8 | 331 | 353 | 80 |

| West Division | GP | W | L | T | OTL | GF | GA | Pts |
|---|---|---|---|---|---|---|---|---|
| Fort Wayne Komets | 82 | 48 | 26 | 0 | 8 | 343 | 284 | 104 |
| Salt Lake Golden Eagles | 82 | 39 | 31 | 0 | 12 | 360 | 357 | 90 |
| Milwaukee Admirals | 82 | 41 | 37 | 0 | 4 | 342 | 358 | 86 |
| Indianapolis Checkers | 82 | 37 | 38 | 0 | 7 | 360 | 387 | 81 |
| Peoria Rivermen | 82 | 31 | 42 | 0 | 9 | 264 | 362 | 71 |

== Turner Cup-Playoffs ==
Turner-Cup-Quarterfinals
E1 | Muskegon Lumberjacks | 4
E4 | Kalamazoo Wings | 1
E2 | Saginaw Generals | 4
E3 | Flint Spirits | 2
W1 | Fort Wayne Komets | 4
W4 | Indianapolis Checkers | 2
W2 | Salt Lake Golden Eagles | 4
W3 | Milwaukee Admirals | 2

Turner-Cup-Semifinals
E1 | Muskegon Lumberjacks | 4
E2 | Saginaw Generals | 0
W1 | Fort Wayne Komets | 1
W2 | Salt Lake Golden Eagles | 4

Turner-Cup-Final
E1 | Muskegon Lumberjacks | 2
W2 | Salt Lake Golden Eagles | 4
