= 1987–88 IHL season =

North American ice hockey season

The 1987–88 IHL season was the 43rd season of the International Hockey League, a North American minor professional league. Nine teams participated in the regular season, and the Salt Lake Golden Eagles won the Turner Cup. The Indianapolis Ice joined the league in the following 1988–89 IHL season.

== Regular season ==
East Division	GP	W	L	T	OTL	GF	GA	Pts
Muskegon Lumberjacks	82	58	14	0	10	415	269	126
Fort Wayne Komets	82	48	30	0	4	343	310	100
Saginaw Hawks	82	45	30	0	7	325	294	97
Flint Spirits	82	42	31	0	9	395	289	93
Kalamazoo Wings	82	37	33	0	12	328	360	86

West Division	GP	W	L	T	OTL	GF	GA	Pts
Colorado Rangers	82	44	35	0	3	344	354	91
Salt Lake Golden Eagles	82	40	34	0	8	308	303	88
Peoria Rivermen	82	34	41	0	7	301	338	75
Milwaukee Admirals	82	21	54	0	7	288	430	49

== Turner Cup-Playoffs ==
Turner Cup-Quarterfinals
E2	Fort Wayne Komets	2
E3	Saginaw Hawks	4
E1	Muskegon Lumberjacks	2
E4	Flint Spirits	4
W1	Colorado Rangers	4
E5	Kalamazoo Wings	3
W2	Salt Lake Golden Eagles	4
W3	Peoria Rivermen	3

Turner Cup-Semifinals
E3	Saginaw Hawks	0
E4	Flint Spirits	4
W1	Colorado Rangers	2
W2	Salt Lake Golden Eagles	4

Turner Cup-Final
E4	Flint Spirits	2
W2	Salt Lake Golden Eagles	4
