= Saginaw Hawks =

Former minor league hockey team

The Saginaw Hawks were an ice hockey team that competed in the International Hockey League from 1987 to 1989. Prominent former Saginaw Hawks include goalie Ed Belfour. The team was formerly known as the Saginaw Generals from 1985 to 1987.

The Saginaw Generals came into existence upon the relocation of the Flint Generals to Saginaw for the 1985–86 International Hockey League season. The Generals were renamed the Saginaw Hawks for the 1987–88 season to reflect their primary affiliation with the Chicago Blackhawks of the National Hockey League. After the 1988–89 season, the Chicago Blackhawks transferred their affiliated players from the Saginaw Hawks to the Indianapolis Ice.

The radio broadcaster for the Hawks from 1987 to 1989 was Greg Waddell, who also broadcast games for the Dayton Bombers of the East Coast Hockey League and the Cincinnati Mighty Ducks of the American Hockey League.

The Director of Sales and Marketing for the Hawks from 1987 to 1989 was Tom Egan, who came aboard after spending a season with the Pittsburgh Gladiators of the Arena Football League as press box and media relations director.
